= List of flag bearers for Palestine at the Olympics =

Palestine at the Olympics
- Flag of Palestine
- IOC code: PLE
- NOC: Palestine Olympic Committee
- Website: www.poc.ps (in Arabic)
- Medals: Gold 0 Silver 0 Bronze 0 Total 0

Summer appearances
- 1996; 2000; 2004; 2008; 2012; 2016; 2020; 2024

This is a list of flag bearers who have represented Palestine at the Olympics.

Flag bearers carry the national flag of their country at the opening ceremony of the Olympic Games.

| # | Event year | Season | Flag bearer | Sport |
|---|---|---|---|---|
| 1 | 1996 | Summer | Majed Abu Maraheel | Athletics |
| 2 | 2000 | Summer | Ramy Deeb | Athletics |
| 3 | 2004 | Summer | Sanna Abubkheet | Athletics |
| 4 | 2008 | Summer | Nader Al-Massri | Athletics |
| 5 | 2012 | Summer | Maher Abu Remeleh | Judo |
| 6 | 2016 | Summer | Mayada Al-Sayad | Athletics |
| 7 | 2020 | Summer | Mohammed Hamada; Dania Nour | Weightlifting; Swimming |
| 8 | 2024 | Summer | Wasim Abusal; Valerie Tarazi | Boxing; Swimming |

== See also ==
- Palestine at the Olympics
