= List of Palestinian records in athletics =

The following are the national records in athletics in Palestine maintained by the Palestine Athletic Federation (PAF).

== Outdoor ==
Key to tables: Awaiting ratification Record not kept by PAF Not ratified or later rescinded by PAF

=== Men ===
Event	Record	Athlete	Date	Meet	Place	Ref.
100 m	10.55 (−0.3 m/s)	Mohammed Abukhousa	6 July 2014		Strasbourg, France	
200 m	21.26 (−0.3 m/s)	Mohammed Abukhousa	13 June 2014		Colmar, France	
400 m	48.61	Mohammed Abukhousa	25 February 2017		Réduit, Mauritius	
400 m	48.4 h	Fareed Faraj	5 March 1989		Kuwait City, Kuwait	
800 m	1:47.04	Wesam Al-Massri	18 May 2017	Islamic Solidarity Games	Baku, Azerbaijan	
1500 m	3:45.32	Wesam Al-Massri	28 September 2014	Asian Games	Incheon, South Korea	
3000 m	8:02.16	Mohammed Baket	16 August 1996		Utrecht, Netherlands	
5000 m	13:33.41	Mohammed Baket	19 July 1997		Hechtel-Eksel, Belgium	
10,000 m	28:04.76	Mohammed Baket	24 August 1996		Troisdorf, Germany	
10 km (road)	28:26	Mohammed Baket	14 July 1996		Noordwijk, Netherlands	
15 km (road)	43:37	Mohammed Baket	17 November 1996		Nijmegen, Netherlands	
20 km (road)	59:01	Mohammed Baket	14 March 1998	20 van Alphen	Alphen aan den Rijn, Netherlands	
Half marathon	1:02:20	Mohammed Baket	29 March 1998	City-Pier-City Loop	The Hague, Netherlands	
Marathon	2:29:28	Ihab Salama	16 April 2000	Rotterdam Marathon	Rotterdam, Netherlands	
110 m hurdles	16.63 (+1.8 m/s)	Ahmed Al-Saleh	11 September 2004		Damascus, Syria	
400 m hurdles	55.38	Maher Helou	27 September 1993		Latakia, Syria	
3000 m steeplechase	9:05.86	Jamal Mahmoud	16 November 1989		New Delhi, India	
High jump	2.00 m	Omran Hafzi Mahmoud	1985		Kuwait City, Kuwait	
Pole vault	3.90 m	Dirar Izat	3 June 1983		Kuwait City, Kuwait	
Long jump	6.88 m	Mohamed Fanona	29 October 1999		Gaza City, Palestine	
Triple jump	14.80 m	Khalil Abdulrahman	5 January 1985		Gaza City, Palestine	
Shot put	14.93 m	Mo'een Al Shaer	28 October 1999		Gaza City, Palestine	
Discus throw	45.50 m	Nader Abdul Raheem	6 November 1979		Kuwait City, Kuwait	
Hammer throw	40.12 m	Zohair Assotary	28 September 2000		Gaza City, Palestine	
Javelin throw	52.12 m	Mohamed Thabet	29 September 2000		Gaza City, Palestine	
Decathlon	5220 pts h	Mamdouh Ali	18-19 August 1992		Latakia, Lebanon	
Decathlon	100m / Long jump / Shot put / High jump / 400m / 110m H / Discus / Pole vault / Javelin / 1500m; 12.7 / 6.10 m / 10.09 m / 1.65 m / 55.6 / 19.3 / 30.64 m / 3.40 m / 42.64 m / 4:26.2					
20 km walk (road)	1:31:22	Ramy Abdelhody Ali Dib	4 February 2000		Cairo, Egypt	
50 km walk (road)	5:59:57	Yasser Ali Dib	26 August 1995		Cairo, Egypt	
4 × 100 m relay	42.2	Palestine	10 April 1979		Kuwait City, Kuwait	
4 × 400 m relay	3:22.2	Palestine	3 May 1990		Mosul, Iraq	

=== Women ===
Event	Record	Athlete	Date	Meet	Place	Ref.
100 m	12.16 (+0.8 m/s)	Hanna Barakat	30 July 2021	Olympic Games	Tokyo, Japan	
200 m	26.90	Ghadir Ghrouf	3 November 2006		Cairo, Egypt	
200 m	26.33 (+1.9 m/s)	Hanna Barakat	18 July 2022	World Championships	Eugene, United States	
400 m	58.20 (Note: by current World Athletics source)	Hanna Barakat	17 June 2021	Arab Championships	Radès, Tunisia	
400 m	58.08 (Note: by World Athletics Statistic Handbook 2022)	Hanna Barakat	20 May 2017		Norwalk, United States	
800 m	2:12.21	Layla Almasri (Note: eligible to compete for PLE with effect of 14th March 2023)	2 August 2024	Olympic Games	Paris, France	
1500 m	4:20.05	Layla Almasri (Note: eligible to compete for PLE with effect of 14th March 2023)	1 June 2024	Music City Track Carnival	Murfreesboro, United States	
Mile	4:36.56	Layla Almasri (Note: eligible to compete for PLE with effect of 14th March 2023)	15 August 2025	Falmouth Track Festival	Falmouth, United States	
3000 m	9:38.85 (Note: Outdoor best, indoor mark ratified as absolute record.)	Mayada Al-Sayad	24 April 2016		Berlin, Germany	
5000 m	15:40.72	Layla Almasri (Note: eligible to compete for PLE with effect of 14th March 2023)	17 April 2025	Bryan Clay Invitational	Azusa, United States	
10,000 m	34:48.07	Mayada Al-Sayad	7 May 2016		Celle, Germany	
10 km (road)	33:45	Mayada Al-Sayad	30 July 2016	Runners City Night	Berlin, Germany	
Half marathon	1:15:20	Mayada Al-Sayad	9 April 2017	German Half Marathon Championships	Hanover, Germany	
25 km (road)	1:31:33	Mayada Al-Sayad	15 May 2016	BIG 25 Berlin	Berlin, Germany	
30 km (road)	1:50:13+	Mayada Al-Sayad	7 April 2019	Hannover Marathon	Hannover, Germany	
Marathon	2:39:28	Mayada Al-Sayad	7 April 2019	Hannover Marathon	Hannover, Germany	
100 m hurdles	19.85 NWI	Ghadir Ghrouf	28 September 2005		Irbid, Jordan	
400 m hurdles	1:19.42	Amina Dubeib	5 September 1990		Latakia, Syria	
3000 m steeplechase						
High jump	1.50 m	Faida Orabi	26 September 1990		Damascus, Syria	
High jump	1.50 m	Reem Hamayel	5 May 2005		Gaza City, Palestine	
Pole vault						
Long jump	5.20 m	Ghadir Ghrouf	May 2007			
Triple jump	9.95 m	Amar Assoued	13 September 2004		Damascus, Syria	
Shot put	10.86 m	Jawaher Aaed	19 February 1999		Gaza City, Palestine	
Discus throw	31.22 m	Ranya Saker Soleiman	5 November 1998		Nablus, Palestine	
Hammer throw						
Javelin throw	47.23 m	Sofia Sakorafa	28 June 2004		Khania, Greece	
Heptathlon	2665 pts h	Nadima Hussein	22-23 August 1988		Damascus, Syria	
Heptathlon	100m H / High jump / Shot put / 200m / Long jump / Javelin / 800m; 20.3 / 1.34 m / 6.39 m / 29.1 / 4.61 m / 12.44 m / 2:44.2					
20 km walk (road)						
50 km walk (road)						
4 × 100 m relay	58.1 h	Palestine	5 May 1994		Damascus, Syria	
4 × 400 m relay	4:53.1 h	Palestine; R. Kabaoui; Maram Kabakali; H. Samra; M. Kantar	19 August 1992		Latakia, Syria	

== Indoor ==
=== Men ===
Event	Record	Athlete	Date	Meet	Place	Ref.
60 m	6.77	Mohammed Abukhousa	19 February 2016	Asian Championships	Doha, Qatar	
200 m	23.13	Omar Chaaban	3 March 2024	Ontario U20 Championships	Toronto, Canada	
400 m	51.65	Bahaa Al Farra	9 March 2012	World Championships	Istanbul, Turkey	
800 m	1:53.48	Abdeselam Al-Dabaji	5 March 2004	World Championships	Budapest, Hungary	
1500 m	3:53.84	Wesam Almassri	7 March 2014	World Championships	Sopot, Poland	
3000 m	8:23.63	Mohammed Bakheet	18 January 1985	World Indoor Games	Paris, France	
60 m hurdles						
High jump						
Pole vault						
Long jump						
Triple jump						
Shot put						
Heptathlon						
Heptathlon	60m / Long jump / Shot put / High jump / 60m H / Pole vault / 1000m					
5000 m walk						
4 × 400 m relay						

=== Women ===
Event	Record	Athlete	Date	Meet	Place	Ref.
60 m	8.42	Ghadir Ghrouf	10 March 2006	World Championships	Moscow, Russia	
200 m						
400 m						
800 m	2:45.33	Wesam Abubkheet	6 February 2004	Asian Championships	Tehran, Iran	
1500 m	4:38.47 (Note: outdoor mark ratified as absolute record)	Mayada Al-Sayad	24 January 2015		Berlin, Germany	
3000 m	9:19.19	Layla Almasri (Note: eligible to compete for PLE with effect of 14th March 2023)	15 February 2025	BU David Hemery Valentine Invitational	Boston, United States	
60 m hurdles						
High jump						
Pole vault						
Long jump						
Triple jump						
Shot put						
Pentathlon						
Pentathlon	60m H / High jump / Shot put / Long jump / 800m					
3000 m walk						
4 × 400 m relay						
