= Majed Abu Maraheel =

Palestinian runner and footballer (1963–2024)

- Abu Maraheel in a 2019 interview

Personal information
- Native name: ماجد أبو مراحيل
- Born: 5 June 1963 Nuseirat, Egyptian-occupied Gaza Strip
- Died: 11 June 2024 (aged 61) Nuseirat, Deir al-Balah, Gaza Strip
- Education: Leipzig University
- Height: 1.80 m (5 ft 11 in)
- Weight: 76 kg (168 lb)

Sport
- Country: Palestine
- Sport: Athletics, football
- Event: Long-distance running
- Club: Al-Zaytoun Sports Club (football)
- Coached by: Nabil Mabrouk (athletics)
- Retired: c. 1998 (athletics), 2004 (football)

Achievements and titles
- Personal best: 10,000 m: 34:40.50

Majed Abu Maraheel (Note: Variously transliterated as Majdi Abu Marahil, Majed Abu Marahil, and Majid Marheel.) (Arabic: ماجد أبو مراحيل, romanized: Mājid ʾAbū Marāḥīl, Arabic pronunciation: [maːd͡ʒid ʔabuː maraħiːl]; 5 June 1963 – 11 June 2024) was a Palestinian long-distance runner, football player, security officer, and athletics coach, who was the first Palestinian to compete at the Olympic Games. Born into a refugee family in the Nuseirat refugee camp of the Gaza Strip, Abu Maraheel took part in athletics and football as a child. Before his international sporting career, he self-trained as a long-distance runner on Gazan streets and beaches, becoming locally famous after winning a variety of local competitions. After winning an eight-kilometer race in 1995, he was recruited by Palestinian National Authority leader Yasser Arafat into Force 17, his personal security force.

Before pursuing his athletics career, Abu Maraheel was a football player for the Al-Zaytoun Sports Club. With his two brothers, he played with the team ever since its formation until switching to athletics in the 1990s. He was the captain and played as a defender for the team, playing in the Gaza Strip Premier League every time the team had a match. Although he came out of retirement in 2004, to compete for his former team in a tournament organized in the Palestine Stadium by the Palestinian Al-Ahly Club.

In his international sporting career, Abu Maraheel competed in the 1995 Arab Athletics Championships, barely being able to attend the event after a lengthy detainment by Egyptian border authorities. The following year, he represented Palestine at the 1996 Summer Olympics in Atlanta, becoming the country's first Olympian and Olympic flag-bearer. He competed in the men's 10,000 meters, ultimately being eliminated after placing 21st in his qualification group.

He retired from athletics upon completing his university education, later serving as an athletics coach to multiple runners of the Palestinian national athletics team, such as Olympians Nader al-Masri, Bahaa al-Farra, and Woroud Sawalha. He died on 11 June 2024, following kidney failure.

== Early life ==
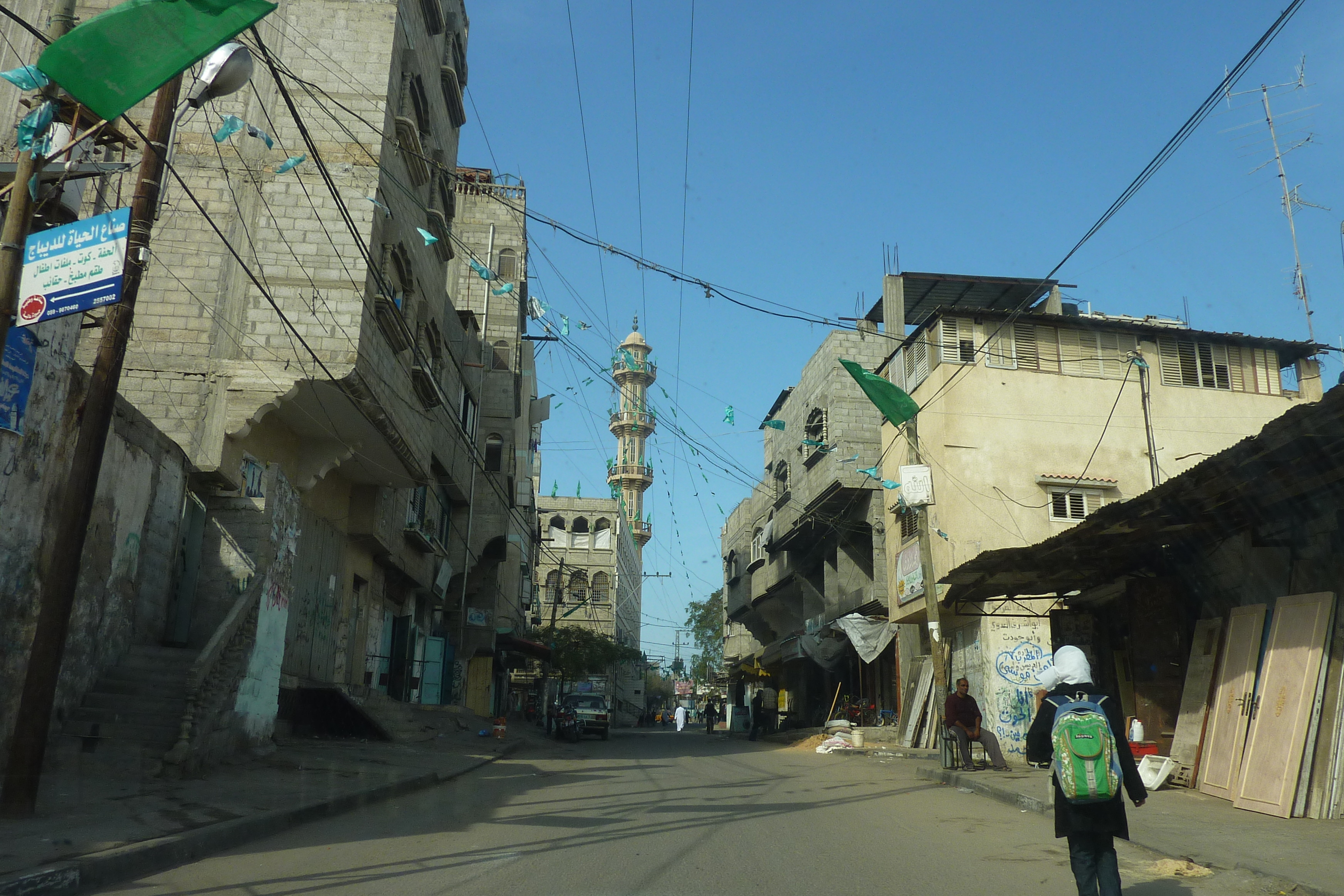
Nuseirat refugee camp, where Abu Maraheel was born

Majed Abu Maraheel was born on 5 June 1963, in a family of Bedouin Palestinian refugees at the Nuseirat camp in the Gaza Strip. His family were maize farmers and ranchers who lived in Beersheba and owned fifteen acres (6.1 ha) of land in the Negev before they were forced to flee in 1948 by the Israel Defense Forces due to the 1948 Palestine war. He and his family eventually lived in the district of Zeitoun.

For his primary school education, he studied at Al-Falah Refugee School in the district of Zeitoun and was named as one of the "stars" of the school's football team. He then studied at Al-Zaytoun School for Refugees in the same district for his preparatory school education and was also part of the school's football team, which was stated to be one of the best preparatory school teams at the time. He dropped out of school at twelve years old and continued to play football, initially hoping to represent the Palestinian national team. He then came back to schooling, studying at Palestine High School and Carmel High School for Boys in Rimal, also taking part in both of the school's football teams.

He later began work as a laborer, tending flowers in Israeli greenhouses and regularly running around 20 kilometers (12 mi) barefoot from his home in Gaza City to catch a bus at the Erez border checkpoint. During these runs, he began considering athletic running to represent Palestine in international competition. His father's interest in sports influenced him and his brothers, Mohamed and Magdy, to pursue sporting careers. Abu Maraheel stated that his father would "pray to God for my success and wait at the door to hear my result."

In 1991, during the First Intifada, he was caught in a crossfire and shot in the arm by an Israeli soldier, penetrating the bone and leaving a three-inch (7.6 cm) scar.

== Football career ==
Starting at a young age, Abu Maraheel initially played football for his former school's teams. He eventually joined the Al-Zaytoun Sports Club at its founding in 1981. He was the captain and a defender for the team and played alongside his brothers, Mohamed, who also played as a defender, and Magdy, who played as a goalkeeper.

He played for the team in 1985 for classification matches that were organized by the Palestinian Football Association, which eventually made the team qualify for the Gaza Strip Premier League, one of the two top divisions in Palestine. After his team's qualification to the league, he played on every occasion the team had a match. He retired from football on c. 1994, after switching to athletics. Though he came out of retirement in 2004, to represent the team in a summer tournament organized by the Palestinian Al-Ahly Club, which was held at the Palestine Stadium. They reached the finals, placing as the runner-up behind the Rafah Services Club, with the latter winning 0–2 through penalty kicks.

== Athletics career ==
=== Early and local athletics career ===
Abu Maraheel trained by himself without a coach, initially wearing improper running shoes and using a Casio wristwatch to time his runs along Gazan streets or beside the Mediterranean on Al Deira Beach. He competed in and won many running competitions in Gaza, garnering him a considerable degree of local fame, to such a degree that many locals began requesting photographs with him.

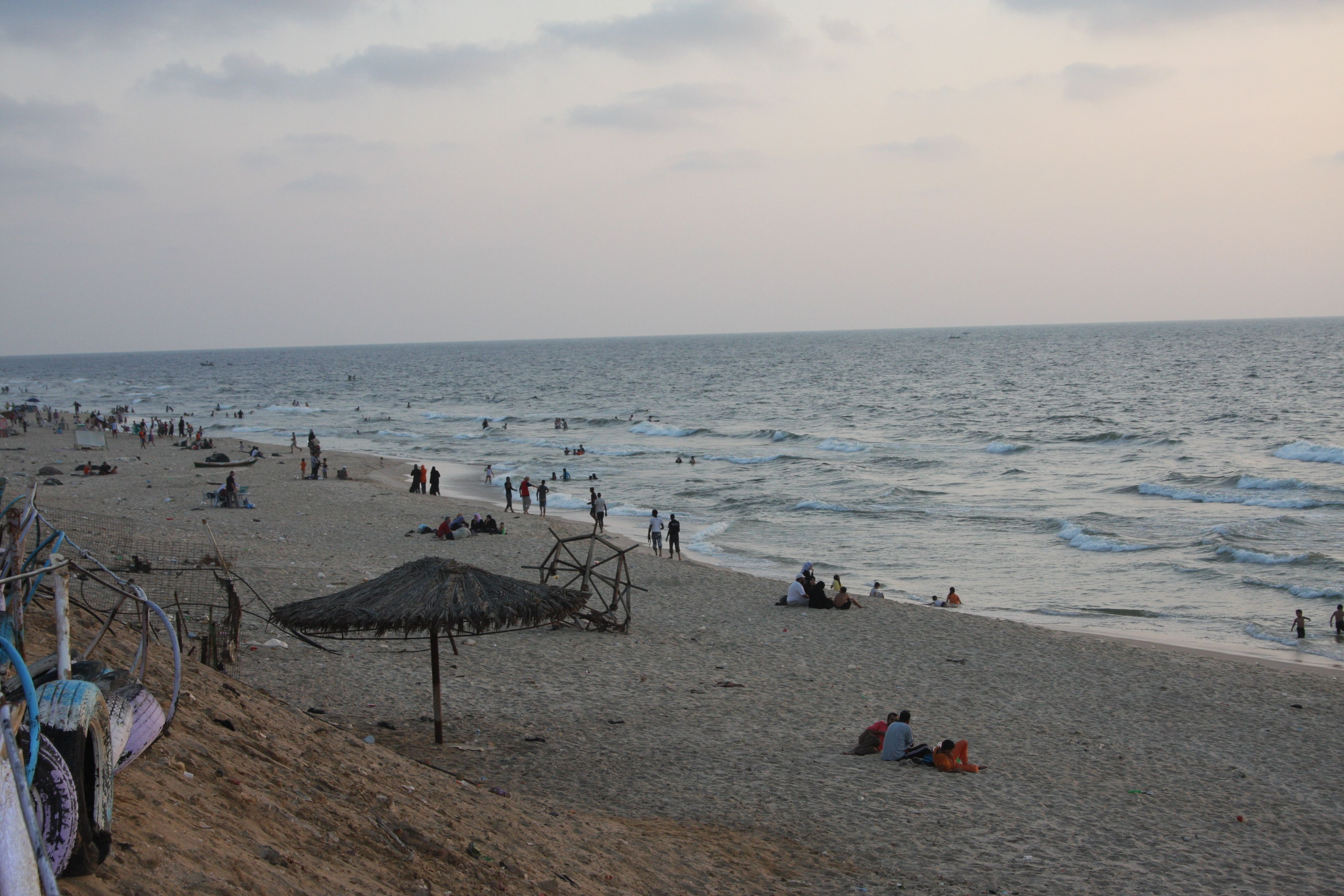
Al Deira Beach, where Abu Maraheel originally self-trained for running

Nabil Mabrouk, president of the Palestinian Track and Field Federation and member of the Palestine Olympic Committee (POC), saw Abu Maraheel in a football match in 1994 between his team and the Al-Tuffah Club. After the match, Mabrouk invited him to the Yarmouk Stadium to train, with Abu Maraheel coming in the next day. Mabrouk eventually served as his coach, with the two alternating between training on the beach and at the stadium. Through Mabrouk's coaching, he won the Gaza Cross Country Championship in January 1995.

He competed in an Olympic Day festival in June 1995, held in Gaza by the Palestinian Ministry of Youth and Sports. He won his division in an eight-kilometer (4.97 mi) race against 500 other men, receiving a trophy and a kiss from Yasser Arafat, President of the Palestinian National Authority and senior leader of the Palestine Liberation Organization, during the awards ceremony. Arafat reportedly told Abu Maraheel, "You will now be with Force 17". He returned a kiss to Arafat and agreed to join the force.

Abu Maraheel worked for four hours a day in Force 17 and trained on the force's rifle range. He stood in the second circle around Arafat during his visits to Gaza, keeping a distance of around 50 meters (160 ft) from the president. Gaza was considered a particularly dangerous area for Arafat, due to intense opposition from the political and militant organization Hamas. Abu Maraheel said that he enjoyed his job, and that he was not in particular danger due to his presence in the second circle of security.

=== International athletics career ===
For his first international competition, Abu Maraheel competed at the 1995 Arab Athletics Championships in Cairo, Egypt, in August 1995. He ran in the men's 10,000-metre event alongside Yasser Ali-Dib, a Palestinian racewalker who was born in Cairo. Prior to the championships, he was detained by Egyptian border security for 10 hours, causing him to almost miss the event. He arrived shortly before the event, and without prior sleep, placed tenth in 36:22.0, with Alyan Sultan Al-Qahtani of Saudi Arabia winning the gold medal seven minutes ahead of him. The following year, Abu Maraheel was set to compete in the 1996 Paris Marathon but could not travel nor compete in the race due to the nation's closure imposed by the Israeli government.

While a multi-ethnic Palestinian Olympic Committee (including both Jewish and Arab athletes) had been recognized by the International Olympic Committee (IOC) in the 1930s, it was unable to participate in the 1936 Berlin Summer Olympics due to Nazi policy. The Palestinian Authority-sponsored team competed at the 1996 Summer Olympic Games in Atlanta, becoming the first Palestinian Olympic team to compete in the Games. The modern Palestinian Olympic Committee was created in 1976. The IOC extended recognition to the POC at the IOC's annual meeting in September 1993, following the ratification of the Oslo Accords.

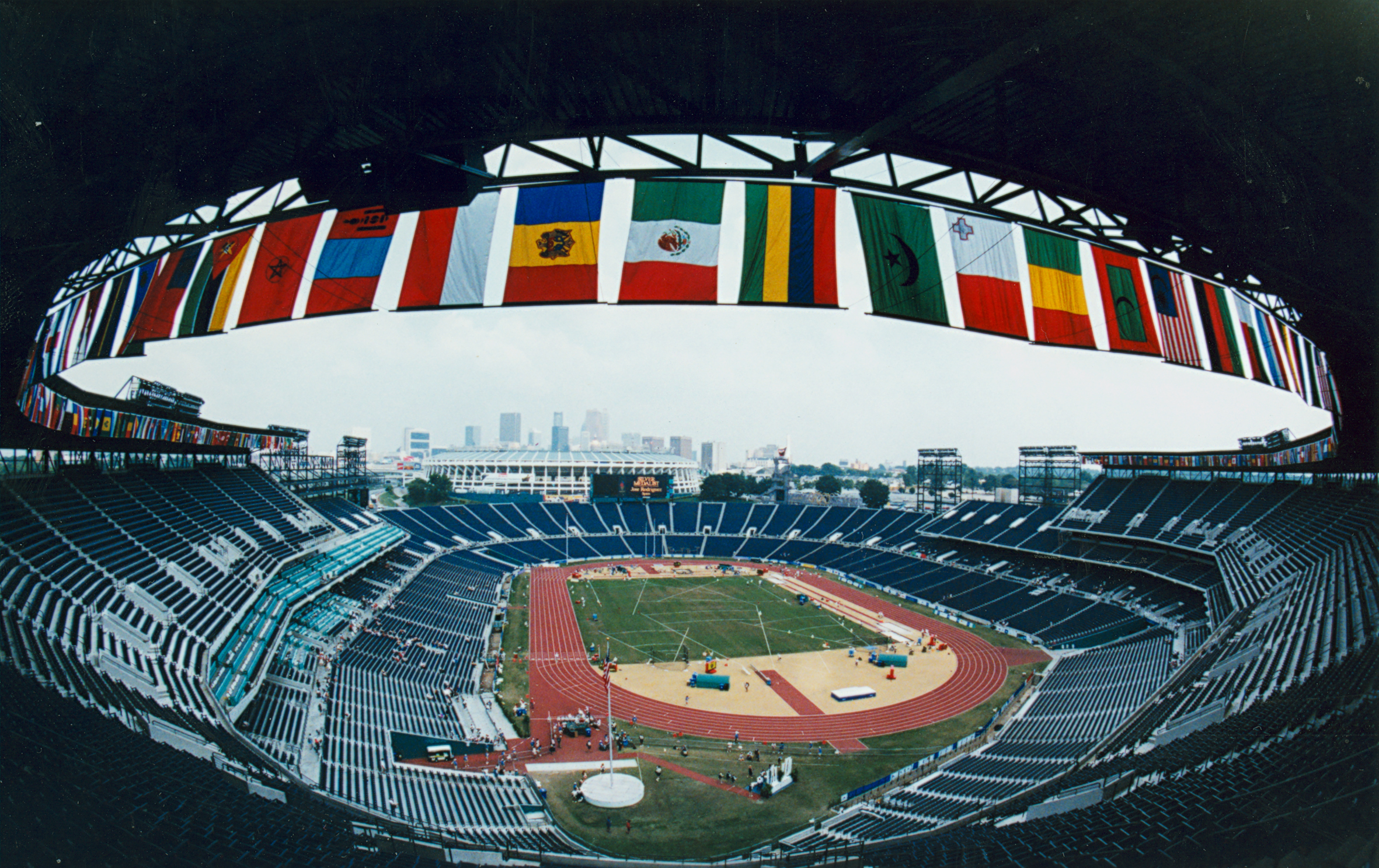
Centennial Olympic Stadium in Atlanta, the site of the 1996 Olympic athletics events

Abu Maraheel and fellow long-distance runner Ihab Salama were set to compete in the men's 10,000 meters and 5000 meters, respectively. For the opening ceremony, he was chosen to be the first ever flag bearer for Palestine at the Olympic Games and said that his main purpose in the Games was "to remind the world that Palestine exists." An IOC donation fund allowed the Palestinian athletes to travel to Atlanta.

Relationships between the Olympic Committee of Israel (OCI) and POC were fairly amicable during the Games, with respective committee presidents Ephraim Zinger and Muammar Bississo meeting during the opening ceremonies. The OCI officially rebuked Israeli governmental opposition to the POC competing under the name "Palestine", and Zinger extended an invitation for the Palestinian delegation to visit the OCI headquarters in Tel Aviv. Abu Maraheel and Salama shook hands, traded pins, and posed for photos with members of the Israeli delegation during the ceremony. Athletes from both delegations later discussed how to use the event as leverage for further peace in the region. They also shared food and training advice.

Both Palestinian athletes went to the Games wearing sneakers and expressed hopes for a donation of track shoes. Abu Maraheel was described by the Daily Press as unlikely to medal at the Games due to his personal best of around 30:00 for the 10,000 meters, almost three minutes behind the contemporary Olympic and world record. He reaffirmed that he was not seeking a gold medal, and that he was running for "peace, and only peace". Acknowledging the long history of conflict between Israel and Palestine, he stated to Sports Illustrated that greater connections between them "will be built through sports."

Abu Maraheel became the first Palestinian to compete in the Olympic Games on 26 July 1996, running and finishing with a time of 34:40.50, almost seven minutes behind the heat winner, Ethiopian runner Worku Bikila. Coming into 21st place in his qualification group, he did not proceed to the finals, ultimately placing 42nd out of 48 athletes. The following year, he competed in the Turin Marathon in Turin, Italy, with fellow Palestinian long-distance runner Mohamed Salama.

Abu Maraheel moved to Germany in 1998 to study at Leipzig University. He was considered to be the first Palestinian student at the institution and graduated from an advanced course for a degree in the Arabic language. While he was a student at Leipzig University, he competed in several races and placed as high as fifth in one of the competitions held in the nation. He also studied for a certificate in athletics coaching at the university and also went to Egypt for four additional certifications.

== Retirement and coaching ==
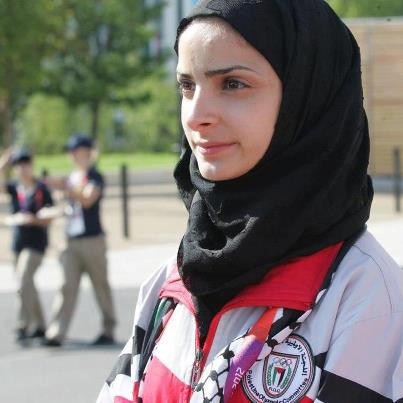
Woroud Sawalha, one of Abu Maraheel's trainees, at the 2012 Summer Olympics

Abu Maraheel retired from athletics after his studies at the university and became the coach for the athletics team of the Palestine Olympic Committee. He also became the vice president of the Palestine Athletic Federation, and a board member and supervisor for his former football team, Al-Zaytoun Sports Club. He resigned from his position as a board member and supervisor at Al-Zaytoun Sports Club on 23 May 2017.

He coached the Palestinian national athletics team, including future Olympian Nader al-Masri, at the 1999 IAAF World Cross Country Championships in Belfast. He coached a variety of other Palestinian athletic teams, including those participating at the 2010 Asian Games in Guangzhou and the 2019 Arab Athletics Championships in Cairo. In Qatar, he trained the Palestinian runners Bahaa al-Farra and Woroud Sawalha for the 2012 Summer Olympics. He also coached the Palestinian team for the 2017 Arab Athletics Championships in Tunis, though the team could not attend due to a closure imposed by Israeli authorities.

Abu Maraheel was part of an organizing committee for the Gaza Olympic Day sporting event. Supported by the United Nations Development Programme and the government of Japan, the event was held at held in Yarmouk Stadium on 19 November 2022, and featured performances and meetings by several national sport federations.

== Personal life ==
Abu Maraheel was a practicing Muslim. He was married and had eight children. An area near his house in Zeitoun was bombed by Israeli F-16 planes during the 2014 Gaza War, with one of his sons, Khaled, being seriously injured when a fragment of a missile was lodged in his head.

=== Death ===
Abu Maraheel suffered kidney failure in 2024 while at the Nuseirat camp. Prior to his death, he was hospitalized for treatment at Shuhada al-Aqsa Hospital in Deir al-Balah. Due to power outages and medical shortages stemming from the Gaza war, medical treatment was limited, and he died on 11 June 2024, at the age of 61. According to Middle East Eye and Maktoob Media, his brother stated that he alongside his family tried to evacuate him through the Rafah Border Crossing for treatment in Egypt, but could not due to the blockade of the Gaza Strip imposed by the Israeli government.

== Career statistics ==
=== International and local competitions ===
The following table shows Abu Maraheel's performances in known local and international competitions.

Majed Abu Maraheel's long-distance running record
| Year | Competition | Venue | Position | Event | Time | Ref. |
|---|---|---|---|---|---|---|
| 1995 | Gaza Cross Country Championship | Gaza Strip, Palestine | 1st | Cross country | | |
| 1995 | Gaza Olympic Day Run | Gaza Strip, Palestine | 1st | 8 km | | |
| 1995 | Arab Championships | Cairo, Egypt | 10th | 10,000 m | 36:22.00 | |
| 1996 | Paris Marathon | Paris, France | — | Marathon | DNS | |
| 1996 | Olympic Games | Atlanta, United States | 21st (Note: Position in qualifying round) | 10,000 m | 34:40.50 | |
| 1997 | Turin Marathon | Turin, Italy | | Marathon | | |
