= Palestine at the 1996 Summer Olympics =

- IOC code: PLE
- NOC: Palestine Olympic Committee
- Website: www.poc.ps (in Arabic)

in Atlanta, United States 19 July 1996 – 4 August 1996
- Competitors: 1 (1 man) in 1 sport
- Flag bearer: Majed Abu Maraheel
- Officials: 1
- Medals: Gold 0 Silver 0 Bronze 0 Total 0

Summer Olympics appearances (overview)
- 1996; 2000; 2004; 2008; 2012; 2016; 2020; 2024; 2028

Palestine competed at the 1996 Summer Olympics in Atlanta, Georgia, United States, which were held from 19 July to 4 August 1996. This marked Palestine's debut at the Olympic Games. The delegation consisted of fifteen people, including Majed Abu Maraheel, who competed as a long-distance runner. Middle-distance runner Ihab Salama and boxer Rashid Judeh were also named as athletes, but did not compete, with the former arriving in Atlanta yet not competing and the latter not permitted to take part, as officials for the boxing events deemed he did not have enough international experience.

The Palestine Olympic Committee (POC) was established in 1933 by the Maccabi Sports Association and was recognised by the International Olympic Committee (IOC) the following year. However, the committee was more of a precursor to the Olympic Committee of Israel (OCI). During its activity, teams representing Palestine were invited to compete at the 1936 and 1948 Summer Olympics, though no team was sent to either edition. Once the OCI was established in 1951, the committee was used to represent the area under the name of "Israel" in sport events such as the Olympics. The POC lost recognition in 1967, though another POC was established in the mid-1970s by the Palestine Supreme Council of Youth Care. Following the ratification of the Oslo Accords in 1993, the IOC gave provisional recognition to the POC before it became a full member in 1995.

Before the start of the 1996 Summer Games, the Israeli government objected to the use of the name "Palestine" as a representation for the team and proposed the use of the name "Palestinian National Authority". The IOC rejected the objection and allowed the Palestinian team to use the name. For the opening ceremony, Abu Maraheel was named the flag bearer during the Parade of Nations. During the Palestinian team's stay in Atlanta, the delegations of the POC and OCI often conversed with each other and discussed using the event as leverage for further peace in the region. Abu Maraheel competed in the men's 10,000 metres and placed 21st in his preliminary heat without advancing to the finals. Since the 1996 Summer Games, Palestine has fielded teams to every Summer Olympics.

== Background ==
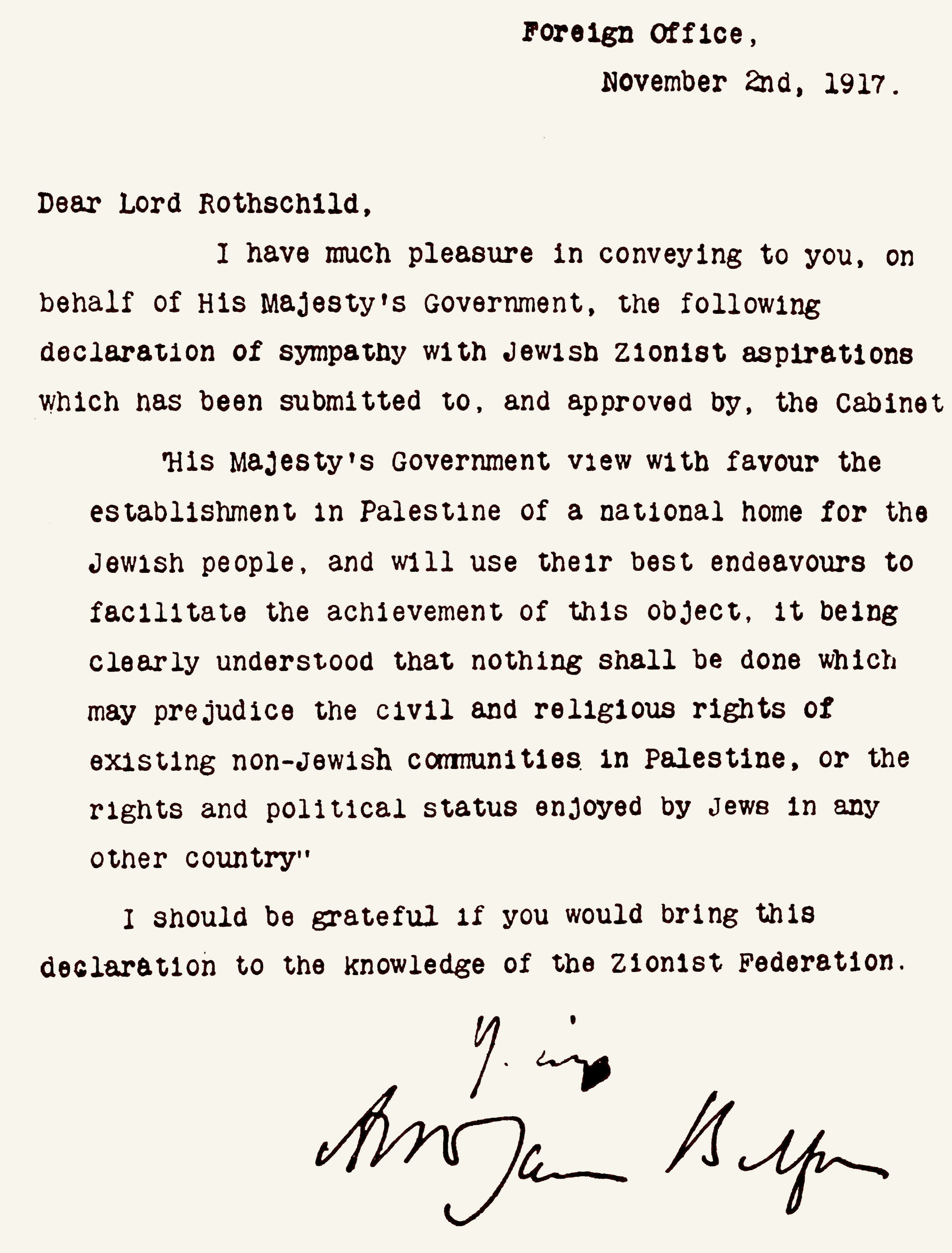
The Balfour Declaration contained in the original letter from Arthur Balfour delivered to Lord Rothschild

Prior to British administration, the Ottoman Empire ruled a majority of the area of Palestine since 1517. In 1917, the government of Britain stated through the Balfour Declaration that it was in support of "the establishment in Palestine of a national home for the Jewish people" and that no measures should be taken to deprive the liberties of non-Jewish communities in Palestine. Mandatory Palestine was then established in 1920, and the British government obtained a Mandate for Palestine from the League of Nations in 1922. The terms of the Mandate encompassed the entire population, though Jewish and Palestinian communities had different agendas in both politics and sport which aligned with their respective national movements. Sports teams from both communities, largely association football, often participated in competitions with each other, but separate leagues also existed to maintain their different agendas.

In 1924, the Jewish-oriented Maccabi Sports Association applied to represent Palestine in the International Amateur Athletic Federation. However, it was rejected on the grounds that it did not represent the entire populace of the nation. The following year, the association formed the Palestinian Football Federation (PFF) and applied for membership in FIFA, reaching out to Hapoel (the Maccabi Sports Association's ideological rival) and Palestinian Arab teams for a more balanced organisation. The PFF were eventually recognised in 1929.

On 26 April 1927, the Zionist-focused newspaper Palestine Bulletin published an article entitled "Palestine and Olympic Games" written by its London correspondent Khalid Ijawi. Ijawi questioned whether the nation was to send a delegation to the 1928 Summer Olympics, also assuming that a Palestinian delegation could join the British delegation at the Games. Prior to their recognition by the IOC, representative delegations organised by Hapoel and the Maccabi Sports Association competed in editions of the International Workers' Olympiad, the Maccabiah Games, and the Mediterranean Athletics Championships.

=== Initial recognition, invitations to the Olympics, and Israeli participation ===
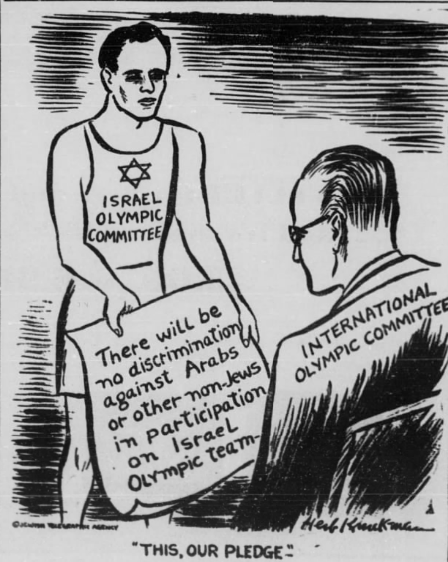
An editorial cartoon published by the Jewish Telegraphic Agency regarding Israel's application to be recognised by the IOC

The Palestine Olympic Committee (POC) was formed in 1933 to "represent the Jewish National Home". The POC applied for International Olympic Committee (IOC) recognition the following year through the Maccabi Sports Association, but was denied as its rules and the committee (composed of Jewish members) did not represent the entire population of Mandatory Palestine, which had coexisting Christian, Jewish, and Muslim communities. Per the Historical Dictionary of the Olympic Movement, the committee was more of a precursor to the Olympic Committee of Israel (OCI). The Maccabi Sports Association then invited Arab businessman Ali al-Mustaqim and a few Christian officials to join the committee, with the former becoming the committee's vice president. The committee gained recognition at the 32nd IOC Session in Athens on 16 May 1934. At its recognition, they had seven Jewish members, one Arab member, and one British member. Arab representation in the committee dissolved due to heightened tensions between native Palestinian and Jewish communities. The committee was invited to compete at the 1936 Summer Olympics held in Nazi Germany, despite lacking Arab representation; they rejected the invitation because of the persecution of Jews by the Nazis.

In 1944, the Arab Palestine Sports Federation was revived, with more Palestinian Arabs competing in organised sport and better support. With this, Arab Palestinian athletes such as boxer Adib al-Dasouqi, who gained success in the Arab world during the 1930s and 1940s, were hoping to compete at the 1948 Summer Olympics, but funds for sport deteriorated as the possibility of another conflict arising grew bigger. On 1 March 1946, a conference was held in Tel Aviv-Jaffa to discuss Palestine's participation at the Summer Games. Most of the Jewish attendees of the conference supported sending a delegation, which included the football team. The committee was invited by the 1948 London Organising Committee but Israel declared independence two months before the Games, leading to the 1948 Palestine war and the Nakba. This led to a threatened boycott by Arab states, which included withdrawals from international sporting federations and absences from international sporting events, if Israel were to compete at the 1948 Summer Games. The invitation was withdrawn by the IOC on grounds that Israel did not have a National Olympic Committee (NOC).

In 1951, the Hapoel and the Maccabi Sports Association created separate NOCs to represent Israel and submitted separate applications for IOC recognition. Due to the presence of two applications for the recognition of the OCI, the IOC requested that the first applicant create a new body and submit a new application. Another prerequisite was that Israeli team members must not discriminate between Jewish and Arab people in order for the OCI to be recognised and for a team representing Israel to be able to compete at the next Olympics. By November of the same year, Hapoel and the Maccabi Sports Association made an agreement to establish the OCI in order to compete at the Olympics, amongst other sport events, and regulate organised sport. The OCI claims it was a reestablishment of the POC, stating that its name prior to reestablishment was the Eretz Yisrael Olympic Committee. The committee was recognised the following year and competed at the 1952 Summer Olympics, competing at every edition of the Summer Olympics with the exception of the 1980 Summer Olympics, as they had joined the United States-led boycott in response to the Soviet–Afghan War. Despite this, teams representing Palestine still competed at the Arab Games with assistance from Egypt and other Arab countries.

=== Establishment and recognition of a new Palestine Olympic Committee ===
According to Nahil Mabrouk, the president of the Palestine Athletic Federation, the POC lost recognition from the IOC in 1967, coinciding with the Six-Day War and the start of the occupation of the Palestinian territories by Israel. The Palestine Supreme Council of Youth Care (later the Palestine Supreme Council for Youth and Sports) was established the following year by the Palestine Liberation Organization (PLO), later holding a conference in the mid-1970s (Note: Olympedia states that the committee was established in 1976, while the Palestine Chronicle states 1974.) in Souk El Gharb, Lebanon, to establish a new POC.

Since its establishment, the POC joined the Union of Arab National Olympic Committees to campaign for recognition by the IOC once more. In 1979, the POC applied for recognition, but was denied, with the scholars Issam Khalidi and Alon K. Raab stating that the Munich massacre in 1972, carried out by Black September, was one of the factors leading to the rejection. The same year, the Palestine Supreme Council for Youth and Sports stated that a Palestinian delegation was invited to compete at the 1980 Summer Olympics, though was later denied by the IOC as the POC was not yet recognised. Despite their absence, Yasser Arafat, Chairman of the Palestine Liberation Organization, was given a tour of the Olympic Village during the Games. The POC had considered applying for recognition again that same year, though were persuaded by the Olympic Council of Asia (OCA) to delay the appeal, as they had speculated IOC resolutions would not be binding amidst the boycott.

Due to the 1982 Israeli invasion of Lebanon, the Palestine Olympic Committee was forced to relocate their headquarters from Lebanon to Damascus, Syria, and then Tunis, Tunisia. The POC continued to apply for IOC recognition and was invited to a meeting headed by the Global Association of International Sports Federations, meeting with members of the media to share their hopes for recognition. In 1986, the POC was granted provisional recognition by the Olympic Council of Asia, though the decision was protested by the OCI, which had been denied membership in 1982. The POC became a member of the OCA in the same year. After that, the POC was again forced to relocate their headquarters, this time to Baghdad, Iraq, due to Israeli strikes on PLO headquarters. In 1989, a petition regarding the POC's cause for recognition was circulated within the IOC.

Following the ratification of the Oslo Accords in 1993, the IOC gave provisional recognition to the POC on 18 September 1993 during the 101st IOC Session in Monte Carlo, Monaco. In 1995, the IOC finally granted permanent membership to the committee and assigned them country code of PLE. They were also invited to compete at the next Summer Olympics.

The 1996 Summer Olympics were held from 19 July to 4 August 1996 in Atlanta, Georgia, United States. This edition of the Games marked Palestine's first appearance at the Olympic Games.

== Delegation ==
=== Size ===
According to The New York Times, a Palestinian sports official at the 1994 Asian Games held in Hiroshima, Japan, stated that the delegation hoped to send around twenty athletes to the 1996 Summer Games. A year later, that estimate was reduced to six. In 1996, Mabrouk stated that they aimed to send three athletes: long-distance runner Majed Abu Maraheel, racewalker Yasser Ali-Dib, who had emigrated to Cairo and was a bronze medalist at the 1995 Arab Athletics Championships, and a female athlete who was going to be chosen by the West Bank branch of the POC.

According to Muammar Bississo, the president of the Palestine Olympic Committee at the time, the delegation could have reached up to 40 athletes, but the government of Israel would not approve the necessary documents for the other Palestinian athletes to compete at the Games. Ultimately, three named athletes were included in the delegation: Abu Maraheel, runner Ihab Salama, and boxer Rashid Judeh. Judeh was not permitted to take part, as officials for the boxing events deemed he did not have enough international experience.

=== Final delegation ===
Prior to the 1996 Summer Games, Abu Maraheel was also a security guard for Force 17, while Salama was a footballer who had been entered as a runner, as none of his teammates were allowed to compete at the Summer Games. They trained for the Summer Games by running on roads and football fields, as an athletics track was not present in the Gaza Strip. The final Palestinian delegation consisted of fifteen members, which included the athletes, judo and boxing coaches, chef de mission Bississo, deputy chef de mission Abdul-hamid Ghanem, attaché Tawfiq Qiamari, and envoy Victor Nassar. An IOC donation fund allowed the Palestinian delegation to travel to Atlanta. Ghanem's cousin, Atlanta-based businessman Amin Ghanem, hosted a reception for the delegation at a restaurant in Gwinnett County.

Before the start of the Summer Games, the Israeli government objected to the use of the name "Palestine" as a representation for the team, with a spokesman for the Israeli Ministry of Foreign Affairs stating that the delegation was using the Summer Games as a "political point". The name "Palestinian National Authority" was proposed instead. OCI member Alex Gilady criticised the government due to the objection, further stating that it could affect the nation's negotiations with Palestinians and the nation's possible debut at the 1997 Mediterranean Games. Ultimately, the IOC denied the objection and let the Palestinian team use the name.

== Opening ceremony and Israeli delegation ==
For the opening ceremony, Abu Maraheel was chosen to be the first flag bearer for Palestine at the Olympic Games. He stated that his main purpose in the Games was "to remind the world that Palestine exists". and that he was "holding in one hand a Palestinian flag and in the other hand an olive branch". The Palestinian delegation wore slacks and checkered sports jackets during the ceremony.

Relationships between the OCI and POC were fairly amicable during the Games, with respective committee presidents Ephraim Zinger and Bississo meeting during the opening ceremonies. The OCI officially rebuked Israeli governmental opposition to the POC competing under the name "Palestine", and Zinger extended an invitation for the Palestinian delegation to visit the OCI headquarters. Abu Maraheel and Salama shook hands, traded pins, and posed for photos with members of the Israeli delegation during the ceremony. Athletes from both delegations later discussed how to use the event as leverage for further peace in the region. They also shared food and training advice.

Both Palestinian athletes went to the Games wearing sneakers and expressed hopes for a donation of track shoes. Abu Maraheel was described by the Daily Press as unlikely to medal at the Games due to his personal best of around 30:00 for the 10,000 meters, almost three minutes behind the contemporary Olympic and world record. He reaffirmed that he was not seeking a gold medal and that he was running for "peace, and only peace". Acknowledging the long history of conflict between Israel and Palestine, he told Sports Illustrated that greater connections between them "will be built through sports."

== Athletics ==
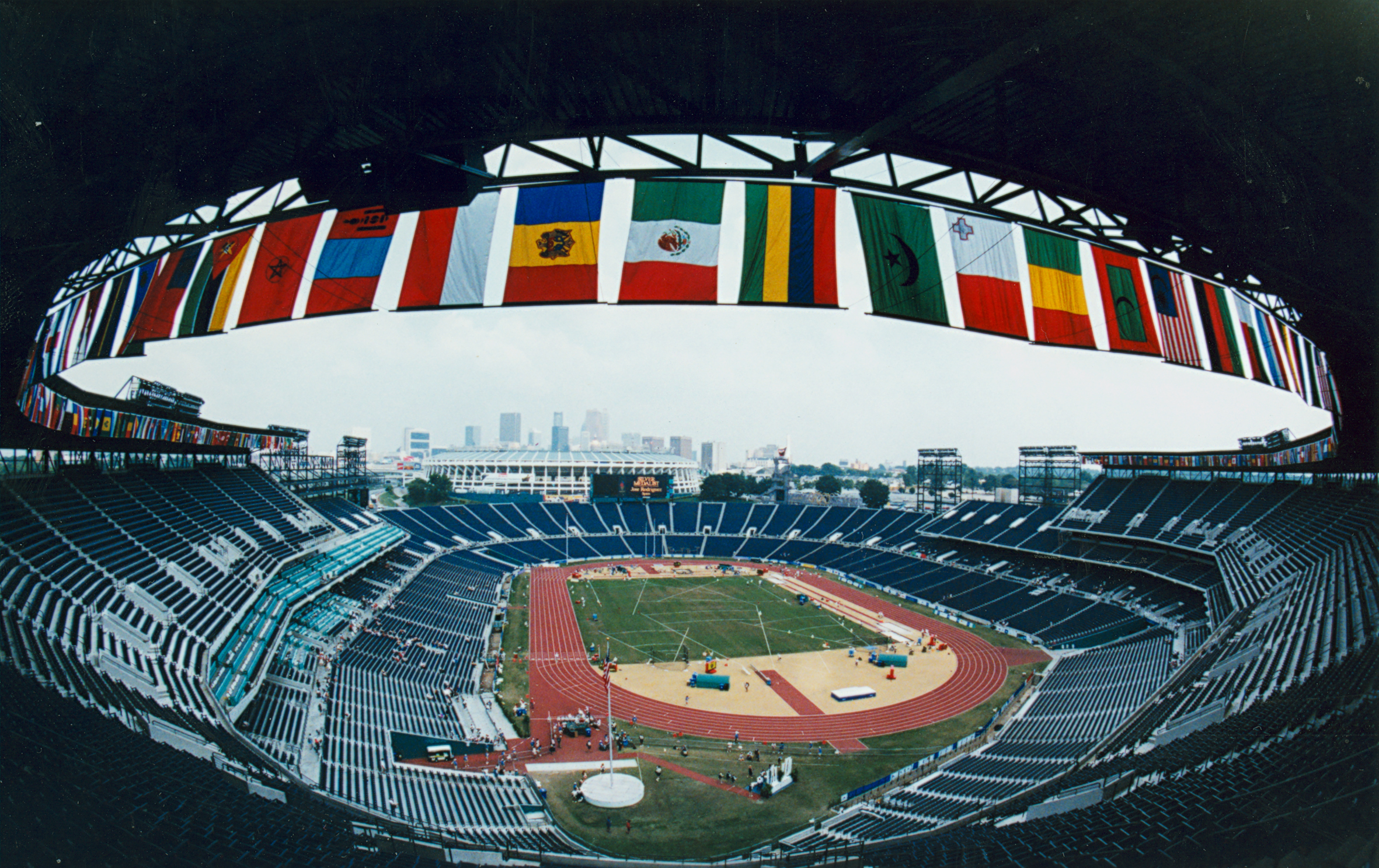
Centennial Olympic Stadium in Atlanta, the site of the 1996 Olympic athletics events

The athletics events at the 1996 Summer Olympics were held at the Centennial Olympic Stadium. Abu Maraheel competed in the men's 10,000 metres on 26 July, where he ran in the first preliminary heat. He placed 21st out of 22 who had started the round and finished with a time of 34:40.50. Haile Gebrselassie of Ethiopia eventually won the gold medal on 29 July with an Olympic record of 27:07.34.

Salama was reported to be entered in the men's 5000 metres. (Note: Attributed to The Jackson Sun and The Oregonian) Prior to the race set to be held on 31 July, he had an open wound on his left toe and wore sandals to an interview with The Atlanta Journal to minimize the pain. During the interview, Abu Maraheel stated that Salama would race "even if it was amputated". In the official report of the Summer Games, Salama's name was not recorded, even as a non-starter.

Key
- Note–Ranks given for track events are within the athlete's heat only.

Athletics summary
Athlete	Event	Heat		Final	
Athlete	Event	Result	Rank	Result	Rank
Majed Abu Maraheel	Men's 10,000 metres	34:40.50	21	Did not advance	

== Legacy ==
After the Games, Abu Maraheel competed at the 1997 Turin Marathon and moved to Germany the following year to study at Leipzig University. He participated in competitions while he was in Germany, though he later retired from competition upon graduating. After his retirement, he coached the Palestinian national athletics team, including future Olympian Nader al-Masri, at the 1999 IAAF World Cross Country Championships in Belfast.

As of 11 August 2024, Palestine has competed in every edition of the Summer Olympics. They have never won an Olympic medal, with their best result coming from judoka Maher Abu Rmeileh, who placed 16th in the men's 73 kg division at the 2012 Summer Olympics.
