= Palestine at the 2024 Summer Olympics =

- Flag of Palestine
- IOC code: PLE
- NOC: Palestine Olympic Committee
- Website: www.poc.ps (in Arabic)

in Paris, France 26 July 2024 – 11 August 2024
- Competitors: 8 (6 men and 2 women) in 6 sports
- Flag bearers (opening): Wasim Abusal & Valerie Tarazi
- Flag bearers (closing): Omar Yaser Ismail & Valerie Tarazi
- Medals: Gold 0 Silver 0 Bronze 0 Total 0

Summer Olympics appearances (overview)
- 1996; 2000; 2004; 2008; 2012; 2016; 2020; 2024

Palestine competed at the 2024 Summer Olympics in Paris, France, from 26 July to 11 August 2024. It was the nation's eighth appearance at the Summer Olympics since its official debut in 1996.

In the lead-up to the event, concerns were raised about the ability of Palestinian athletes to participate due to the destruction of sporting facilities and the exposure to potential harm amid the Gaza war. The Palestinian Campaign for the Academic and Cultural Boycott of Israel reported that, according to the Palestine Football Association, 69 Palestinian athletes of Olympic sports were killed in Israeli attacks or as a result of the intensification of the Israeli blockade between October 2023 and July 2024, including Nagham Abu Samra, a karateka who was expected to compete in the event, and several members of the national volleyball team, as well as Majed Abu Maraheel, Palestine's first Olympic flagbearer, Hani Al-Masdar, assistant coach of the Palestinian Olympic football team, and Bilal Abu Samaan, coach of the country's athletics team. Gazan weightlifter Mohammed Hamada, who had competed in the 2020 Olympics, lost 20 kg (44 lb) in the famine and injured his knee while transporting water, thus failing to qualify for the 2024 event.

Several members of the Palestinian delegation additionally stressed on the importance they felt Palestinian representation would have in the context of the war, as well as their intention to bring a "message of peace". This included the shirt worn by flagbearer Wasim Abusal during the opening flag parade, which depicted two children playing under warplanes dropping bombs, accompanied by the Olympic rings, olive branches and the Arabic word for 'freedom' (حرية, ḥurriyya).

== Competitors ==
The following is the list of number of competitors in the Games. A total of eight athletes competed, the highest number in Palestinian Olympic history.

Sport	Men	Women	Total
Athletics	1	1	2
Boxing	1	0	1
Judo	1	0	1
Shooting	1	0	1
Swimming	1	1	2
Taekwondo	1	0	1
Total	6	2	8

== Athletics ==
Palestine sent two middle-distance runners to compete at the 2024 Summer Olympics.

Key

- Note–Ranks given for track events are within the athlete's heat only
- Q = Qualified for the next round
- q = Qualified for the next round as a fastest loser or, in field events, by position without achieving the qualifying target
- NR = National record
- N/A = Round not applicable for the event
- Bye = Athlete not required to compete in round

Track events

Athlete	Event	Heat		Repechage		Semifinal		Final	
Athlete	Event	Result	Rank	Result	Rank	Result	Rank	Result	Rank
Mohammed Dwedar	Men's 800 m	1:54.83	54	1:54.83	32	Did not advance			
Layla Almasri	Women's 800 m	2:12.21 NR	48	2:16.72	30	Did not advance			

== Boxing ==
For the first time, Palestine entered one boxer into the Olympic tournament. Wasim Abusal (men's featherweight) qualified for the games through the allocation of a universality spot.

Athlete	Event	Round of 32	Round of 16	Quarterfinals	Semifinals	Final	
Athlete	Event	Opposition Result	Opposition Result	Opposition Result	Opposition Result	Opposition Result	Rank
Wasim Abusal	Men's 57 kg	Ibrahim (SWE); L 0–5	Did not advance				17

== Judo ==
Palestine qualified one judoka for the following weight class at the Games. Fares Badawi qualified for the games through the allocation of a universality spot.

Athlete	Event	Round of 32	Round of 16	Quarterfinals	Semifinals	Repechage	Final / BM	
Athlete	Event	Opposition Result	Opposition Result	Opposition Result	Opposition Result	Opposition Result	Opposition Result	Rank
Fares Badawi	Men's −81 kg	Makhmadbekov (TJK); L 00–10	Did not advance					17

== Shooting ==
For the first time, Palestinian shooters achieved one quota place for Paris 2024 based on the allocations of universality spots.

Athlete	Event	Qualification		Final	
Athlete	Event	Points	Rank	Points	Rank
Jorge Antonio Salhe	Men's skeet	100	30	Did not advance	

== Swimming ==
Palestine sent two swimmers to compete at the 2024 Paris Olympics.

Athlete	Event	Heat		Semifinal		Final	
Athlete	Event	Time	Rank	Time	Rank	Time	Rank
Yazan Al-Bawwab	Men's 100 m backstroke	58.26	43	Did not advance			
Valerie Tarazi	Women's 200 m medley	2:20.56	32	Did not advance			

== Taekwondo ==
For the first time, Palestine qualified one athlete to compete at the games. Omar Yaser Ismail qualified for the games after winning the semifinal rounds in his class at the 2024 Asian Qualification Tournament in Tai'an, China, marking the nations debut in this sport.

Athlete	Event	Qualification	Round of 16	Quarterfinals	Semifinals	Repechage	Final / BM	
Athlete	Event	Opposition Result	Opposition Result	Opposition Result	Opposition Result	Opposition Result	Opposition Result	Rank
Omar Yaser Ismail	Men's −58 kg	Tiranvalipour (EOR); W 2–0	Vicente Yunta (ESP); L 0–2	Did not advance				11

== See also ==
- Palestine at the 2024 Summer Paralympics
- Palestine at the Olympics
