= Palestine at the 2012 Summer Olympics =

- Flag of Palestine
- IOC code: PLE
- NOC: Palestine Olympic Committee
- Website: www.poc.ps (in Arabic)

in London
- Competitors: 5 in 3 sports
- Flag bearers: Maher Abu Remeleh (opening); Woroud Sawalha (closing)
- Medals: Gold 0 Silver 0 Bronze 0 Total 0

Summer Olympics appearances (overview)
- 1996; 2000; 2004; 2008; 2012; 2016; 2020; 2024

Palestine competed at the 2012 Summer Olympics in London, held from 27 July to 12 August 2012. This was the nation's fifth consecutive appearance at the Summer Games.

Five Palestinian athletes were selected to the team, competing only in athletics, judo, and swimming. Four of them were granted a wild card entry to participate in these Olympic Games, without having qualified. Judoka Maher Abu Remeleh, was Palestine's only qualifying athlete, and the first to qualify for the games in the nation's history. Abu Remeleh became the nation's flag bearer at the opening ceremony. Palestine, whose athletes have been allowed to compete under its flag by the International Olympic Committee only since 1996, has yet to win its first Olympic medal.

== Athletics ==
Palestine selected 2 athletes by a wildcard.

Key

- Note–Ranks given for track events are within the athlete's heat only
- Q = Qualified for the next round
- q = Qualified for the next round as a fastest loser or, in field events, by position without achieving the qualifying target
- NR = National record
- N/A = Round not applicable for the event
- Bye = Athlete not required to compete in round

Men

Athlete	Event	Heat		Semifinal		Final	
Athlete	Event	Result	Rank	Result	Rank	Result	Rank
Bahaa Al Farra	400 m	49.93	8	did not advance			

Women

Athlete	Event	Heat		Semifinal		Final	
Athlete	Event	Result	Rank	Result	Rank	Result	Rank
Woroud Sawalha	800 m	2:29.16	8	did not advance			

== Judo ==
Palestine qualified 1 judoka.

Athlete	Event	Round of 64	Round of 32	Round of 16	Quarterfinals	Semifinals	Repechage	Final / BM	
Athlete	Event	Opposition Result	Opposition Result	Opposition Result	Opposition Result	Opposition Result	Opposition Result	Opposition Result	Rank
Maher Abu Remeleh	Men's −73 kg	Bye	van Tichelt (BEL); L 0000–0100	did not advance					

== Swimming ==
Palestine gained two "Universality places" from the FINA.

Men

Athlete	Event	Heat		Final	
Athlete	Event	Time	Rank	Time	Rank
Ahmed Gebrel	400 m freestyle	4:08.51	27	did not advance	

Women

Athlete	Event	Heat		Semifinal		Final	
Athlete	Event	Time	Rank	Time	Rank	Time	Rank
Sabine Hazboun	50 m freestyle	28.28	51	did not advance			

== Difficulties and controversy ==
=== Training difficulties ===
The six athletes competing for Palestine at the 2012 games faced distinct disadvantages. Most basically, they lacked the proper means by which to prepare. As Hani Halabi, head of the 2012 Palestinian delegation, explains that his athletes have "no facilities, no coach, no moving for the player from town to town – from Jerusalem to Ramallah, from Ramallah to Bethlehem". In fact, the first time all the members of the Palestinian delegation were together was upon arrival at Heathrow airport in London. Despite these hardships, when the head of the Israeli delegation offered joint facilities and staff to the Palestinians, Halabi refused. "We are in occupation," he says. Rather than the Olympics being a place of peace and reconciliation - where people set aside their differences and compete "for the love of the game" - Halibi believed Palestine's participation in the games would "bring the conflict with Israel into sharper relief".

=== Moment of silence proposal ===
Ankie Spitzer, wife of 1972 Munich Massacre victim Andrei Spitzer, has requested prior to every Olympic games since those of 1972 that the International Olympic Committee hold a moment of silence during the opening ceremonies to remember the eleven victims of the massacre. However, the IOC has denied all of these requests. As the London 2012 games would be the 40th anniversary of the Munich tragedy, Spitzer spearheaded an online petition for a moment of silence during the games' opening ceremonies, which garnered over 100,000 signatures. Again, however, the IOC denied the request, committee chairman Jacques Rogge affording that "the Opening Ceremony is an atmosphere that is not fit to remember such a tragic incident". While many, including members of Olympic Committee of Israel, accused Rogge and the IOC of being insensitive, Jibril Rajoub, head of the Palestinian Football Federation, sent a letter to Chairman Rogge thanking him for denying the moment of silence proposal. "Sports is a bridge for love, connection and relaying peace between peoples. It should not be a factor for separation and spreading racism between peoples," Rajoub wrote. A senior official of the Palestinian Authority corroborated Rajoub's letter to the IOC, expressing Palestine's opposition to "Israel's attempts to exploit the Olympic Games for propaganda purposes".

== See also ==
- Palestine at the 2012 Summer Paralympics
