= Mohammed Barakat =

Mohammed Barakat may refer to:

- Mohammed Barakat (field hockey), (born 1967), American hockey player
- Mohamed Barakat (born 1976), Egyptian footballer
- Mohammed Barakat (footballer) (1984–2024), Palestinian footballer
- Mohamad Barakat (1986–2023), perpetrator of the 2023 shooting of Fargo police officers
