= Palestine at the 2020 Summer Olympics =

- Flag of Palestine
- IOC code: PLE
- NOC: Palestine Olympic Committee
- Website: www.poc.ps (in Arabic)

in Tokyo July 23, 2021 – August 8, 2021
- Competitors: 5 in 4 sports
- Flag bearers (opening): Dania Nour; Mohammed Hamada
- Flag bearer (closing): N/A
- Medals: Gold 0 Silver 0 Bronze 0 Total 0

Summer Olympics appearances (overview)
- 1996; 2000; 2004; 2008; 2012; 2016; 2020; 2024

Palestine competed at the 2020 Summer Olympics in Tokyo. Originally scheduled to take place from 24 July to 9 August 2020, the Games were postponed to 23 July to 8 August 2021, due to the COVID-19 pandemic. It is the nation's seventh appearance at the Summer Olympics.

== Competitors ==
The following is the list of number of competitors in the Games.

| Sport | Men | Women | Total |
|---|---|---|---|
| Athletics | 0 | 1 | 1 |
| Judo | 1 | 0 | 1 |
| Swimming | 1 | 1 | 2 |
| Weightlifting | 1 | 0 | 1 |
| Total | 3 | 2 | 5 |

== Athletics ==
Palestine received a universality slot from the World Athletics to send a female track and field athlete to the Olympics.

Key

- Note–Ranks given for track events are within the athlete's heat only
- Q = Qualified for the next round
- q = Qualified for the next round as a fastest loser or, in field events, by position without achieving the qualifying target
- NR = National record
- N/A = Round not applicable for the event
- Bye = Athlete not required to compete in round

Track & road events

| Athlete | Event | Heat | | Quarterfinal | | Semifinal | | Final | |
| Athlete | Event | Result | Rank | Result | Rank | Result | Rank | Result | Rank |
|---|---|---|---|---|---|---|---|---|---|
| Hanna Barakat | Women's 100 m | 12.16 | 5 | Did not advance | | | | | |

== Judo ==
Palestine entered one male judoka into the Olympic tournament after International Judo Federation awarded them a tripartite invitation quota.

| Athlete | Event | Round of 32 | Round of 16 | Quarterfinals | Semifinals | Repechage | Final / BM | |
| Athlete | Event | Opposition Result | Opposition Result | Opposition Result | Opposition Result | Opposition Result | Opposition Result | Rank |
|---|---|---|---|---|---|---|---|---|
| Wesam Abu Rmilah | Men's –81 kg | Ressel (GER); L 00–10 | Did not advance | | | | | |

== Swimming ==
Palestine received a universality invitation from FINA to send two top-ranked swimmers (one per gender) in their respective individual events to the Olympics, based on the FINA Points System of June 28, 2021.

| Athlete | Event | Heat | | Semifinal | | Final | |
| Athlete | Event | Time | Rank | Time | Rank | Time | Rank |
|---|---|---|---|---|---|---|---|
| Yazan Al-Bawwab | Men's 100 m freestyle | 54.51 | 66 | Did not advance | | | |
| Dania Nour | Women's 50 m freestyle | 30.43 | 71 | Did not advance | | | |

== Weightlifting ==
Palestine received an invitation from the Tripartite Commission and the IWF to send Mohammed Hamada in the men's 96-kg category to the Olympics.

| Athlete | Event | Snatch | | Clean & Jerk | | Total | Rank |
| Athlete | Event | Result | Rank | Result | Rank | Total | Rank |
|---|---|---|---|---|---|---|---|
| Mohammed Hamada | Men's –96 kg | 137 | 15 | 173 | 12 | 310 | 13 |
