= Palestine at the 2004 Summer Olympics =

- Flag of Palestine
- IOC code: PLE
- NOC: Palestine Olympic Committee
- Website: www.poc.ps (in Arabic)

in Athens
- Competitors: 3 in 2 sports
- Flag bearer: Sanna Abubkheet
- Medals: Gold 0 Silver 0 Bronze 0 Total 0

Summer Olympics appearances (overview)
- 1996; 2000; 2004; 2008; 2012; 2016; 2020; 2024

Palestine competed at the 2004 Summer Olympics in Athens, Greece, from 13 to 29 August 2004.

The Palestine Olympic Committee listed Sofia Sakorafa, a Greek-born former javelin world record holder who had recently obtained Palestinian citizenship, as part of its delegation. The International Olympic Committee, however, barred Sakorafa from competing, due to her failing to meet the qualifying standard.

== Athletics ==
Palestinian athletes have so far achieved qualifying standards in the following athletics events (up to a maximum of 3 athletes in each event at the 'A' Standard, and 1 at the 'B' Standard).

Key

- Note–Ranks given for track events are within the athlete's heat only
- Q = Qualified for the next round
- q = Qualified for the next round as a fastest loser or, in field events, by position without achieving the qualifying target
- NR = National record
- N/A = Round not applicable for the event
- Bye = Athlete not required to compete in round

Men

Athlete	Event	Heat		Semifinal		Final	
Athlete	Event	Result	Rank	Result	Rank	Result	Rank
Abdal Salam Al-Dabaji	800 m	1:53.86	8	did not advance			

Women

Athlete	Event	Heat		Semifinal		Final	
Athlete	Event	Result	Rank	Result	Rank	Result	Rank
Sanna Abubkheet	800 m	2:32.10	7	did not advance			

== Swimming ==
Men

Athlete	Event	Heat		Semifinal		Final	
Athlete	Event	Time	Rank	Time	Rank	Time	Rank
Rad Aweisat	100 m butterfly	1:01.60	59	did not advance			

== See also ==
- Palestine at the 2002 Asian Games
- Palestine at the 2004 Summer Paralympics
