= Palestine at the 2000 Summer Olympics =

- Flag of Palestine
- IOC code: PLE
- NOC: Palestine Olympic Committee
- Website: www.poc.ps (in Arabic)

in Sydney
- Competitors: 2 in 2 sports
- Flag bearer: Ramy Deeb
- Medals: Gold 0 Silver 0 Bronze 0 Total 0

Summer Olympics appearances (overview)
- 1996; 2000; 2004; 2008; 2012; 2016; 2020; 2024; 2028

Palestine was represented at the 2000 Summer Olympics in Sydney, New South Wales, Australia by the Palestine Olympic Committee.

In total, two athletes including one man and one woman represented Palestine in two different sports including athletics and swimming. It was their largest delegation at an Olympics at the time, one more than had represented the territory on their debut at the 1996 Summer Olympics in Atlanta, Georgia, United States. Swimmer Samar Nassar was the first woman to represent Palestine at the Olympics.

== Background ==
The Palestine Olympic Committee had been created in 1976 but was not recognised by the International Olympic Committee (IOC) until 1993. They made their Olympic debut the following year at the 1996 Summer Olympics in Atlanta, Georgia, United States. Majed Abu Maraheel was the only athlete to represent the territory during their debut games in the men's 10,000 m. He finished 21st in his heat and did not reach the final of the event.

== Competitors ==
In total, two athletes represented Palestine at the 2000 Summer Olympics in Sydney, New South Wales, Australia across two different sports.

| Sport | Men | Women | Total |
|---|---|---|---|
| Athletics | 1 | 0 | 1 |
| Swimming | 0 | 1 | 1 |
| Total | 1 | 1 | 2 |

== Athletics ==
In total, one Palestinian athlete participated in the athletics events – Ramy Deeb in the men's 20 km race walk.

| Athlete | Event | Final | |
| Athlete | Event | Result | Rank |
|---|---|---|---|
| Ramy Deeb | 20 km walk | 1:32:32 | 44 |

== Swimming ==
In total, one Palestinian athlete participated in the swimming events – Samar Nassar in the women's 50 m freestyle.

| Athlete | Event | Heat | | Semifinal | | Final | |
| Athlete | Event | Time | Rank | Time | Rank | Time | Rank |
|---|---|---|---|---|---|---|---|
| Samar Nassar | 50 m freestyle | 30.05 | 65 | did not advance | | | |

== Aftermath ==
Palestine established themselves as a regular competitor at the Summer Olympics. The size of their delegations increased at each subsequent Olympics until peaking at six athletes for the 2016 Summer Olympics in Rio de Janeiro, Brazil.

== See also ==
- Palestine at the 2000 Summer Paralympics
