= Nizar Taleb =

Palestinian kickboxer and Olympic sports administrator

Nizar Taleb (Arabic: نزار طالب; born 1977) is a Palestinian former competitive kickboxer and sports administrator.

Taleb won the World Kickboxing Association (WKA) World Championship in Copenhagen in 1998 in kickboxing. He defeated England's Richard Rabid in the final, following victories over Sweden's Tony Borg and Germany's Lennard Dam. He subsequently won the Asian championship in the light-contact division at 64 kg in 2000, defeating Syria's Mohammad Janda Li in the final.

Taleb later became involved in the administration of Palestinian kickboxing. He serves as a technical director and subsequently as vice president of the Palestinian Kickboxing Federation.

He has also served in international kickboxing administration, including as a member of both the WAKO Technical Committee and Belt Grading and Syllabus Committee. In 2025, Taleb became chairman of the Palestinian Mixed Martial Arts Committee, established under the Palestinian Kickboxing Federation.

Taleb was a member of the Executive Board of the Palestine Olympic Committee from 2021 to 2024 and served as president of its Athletes' Commission. He was elected to the committee's executive board in November 2021 and represented Palestinian athletes in the organisation's activities through the period of the 2024 Summer Olympics.
