= 2007 Asian Athletics Championships – Women's 200 metres =

The women's 200 metres event at the 2007 Asian Athletics Championships was held in Amman, Jordan on July 27–28.

== Medalists ==
Gold	Silver	Bronze
Susanthika Jayasinghe; Sri Lanka	Buddika Sujani; Sri Lanka	Vu Thi Huong; Vietnam

== Results ==
=== Heats ===
Wind: Heat 1: +2.1 m/s, Heat 2: +0.6 m/s

Rank	Heat	Name	Nationality	Time	Notes
1	2	Susanthika Jayasinghe	Sri Lanka	23.35	Q
2	1	Buddika Sujani	Sri Lanka	23.88	Q
3	2	Vu Thi Huong	Vietnam	23.97	Q
4	2	Zou Yingting	China	24.17	Q
5	2	Gretta Taslakian	Lebanon	24.58	q
6	1	Chen Shu-Chuan	Chinese Taipei	24.71	Q
7	1	Maryam Tousi	Iran	25.16	Q
8	2	Oh Hyung-mi	South Korea	25.17	q
9	1	Sadaf Siddiqui	Pakistan	26.06	
10	2	Wong Zeteng	Singapore	26.21	
11	1	Gharid Ghrouf	Palestine	26.8?	
	1	Ghofrane Mohamed	Syria	DQ	FS

=== Final ===
Wind: +1.9 m/s

Rank	Lane	Name	Nationality	Time	Notes
1st place, gold medalist(s)	3	Susanthika Jayasinghe	Sri Lanka	22.99	
2nd place, silver medalist(s)	5	Buddika Sujani	Sri Lanka	23.28	
3rd place, bronze medalist(s)	4	Vu Thi Huong	Vietnam	23.30	
4	2	Zou Yingting	China	23.48	
5	7	Gretta Taslakian	Lebanon	24.33	
6	6	Chen Shu-Chuan	Chinese Taipei	24.58	
7	8	Maryam Tousi	Iran	25.06	
	1	Oh Hyung-mi	South Korea	DNF	
