= Palestine at the 2011 World Championships in Athletics =

- WA code: PLE
- National federation: Palestine Athletic Federation

in Daegu
- Competitors: 1
- Medals: Gold 0 Silver 0 Bronze 0 Total 0

World Championships in Athletics appearances
- 1983; 1987; 1991; 1993; 1995; 1997; 1999; 2001; 2003; 2005; 2007; 2009; 2011; 2013; 2015; 2017; 2019; 2022; 2023

Palestine competed at the 2011 World Championships in Athletics from August 27 to September 4 in Daegu, South Korea. One athlete was announced to represent the country in the event.

== Results ==
=== Men ===
Athlete	Event	Preliminaries		Heats		Semifinals		Final	
Athlete	Event	Time Width Height	Rank	Time Width Height	Rank	Time Width Height	Rank	Time Width Height	Rank
Bahaa Al Farra	400 metres			49.04 PB	33	Did not advance			
