= Palestine at the 2016 Summer Olympics =

- Flag of Palestine
- IOC code: PLE
- NOC: Palestine Olympic Committee
- Website: www.poc.ps (in Arabic)

in Rio de Janeiro
- Competitors: 6 in 4 sports
- Flag bearer: Mayada Al-Sayad
- Medals: Gold 0 Silver 0 Bronze 0 Total 0

Summer Olympics appearances (overview)
- 1996; 2000; 2004; 2008; 2012; 2016; 2020; 2024

Palestine competed at the 2016 Summer Olympics in Rio de Janeiro, Brazil, from 5 to 21 August 2016. This was the nation's sixth consecutive appearance at the Summer Olympics.

Palestine Olympic Committee sent the nation's largest ever delegation to the Games. A total of six athletes, four men and two women, were selected to the Palestinian team across four different sports. Four of them were invited to compete in their respective sporting events, with the other two qualifying for the Games on merit. Among the sports represented by the athletes, Palestine marked its Olympic debut in equestrian.

The Palestinian roster featured middle-distance freestyle swimmer Ahmed Gebrel, the lone returning Olympian from London 2012, and three of its athletes being born and raised in Germany: judoka Simon Yacoub (men's 66 kg), Dressage horse rider and dual citizen Christian Zimmermann, and marathon runner Mayada Al-Sayad, who led the delegation as the nation's flag bearer in the opening ceremony, the second female in history since Sanna Abubkheet did so in 2004. Palestine, whose athletes have been allowed to compete under its flag by the International Olympic Committee only since 1996, has yet to win its first Olympic medal.

== Athletics ==
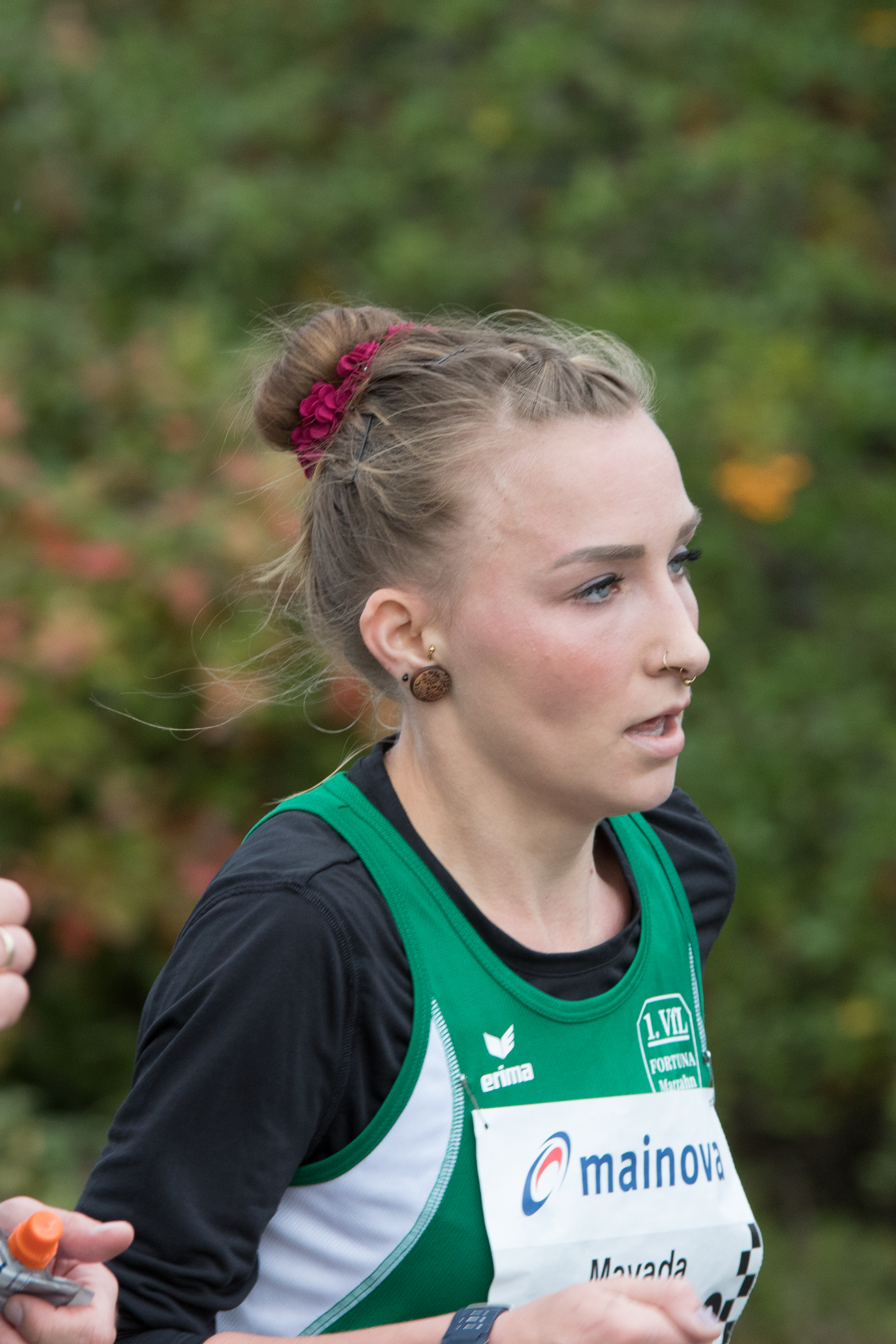
Mayada Al-Sayad

Palestinian athletes have so far achieved qualifying standards in the following athletics events (up to a maximum of 3 athletes in each event):

Key

- Note–Ranks given for track events are within the athlete's heat only
- Q = Qualified for the next round
- q = Qualified for the next round as a fastest loser or, in field events, by position without achieving the qualifying target
- NR = National record
- N/A = Round not applicable for the event
- Bye = Athlete not required to compete in round

Track & road events

Athlete	Event	Heat		Quarterfinal		Semifinal		Final	
Athlete	Event	Result	Rank	Result	Rank	Result	Rank	Result	Rank
Mohammed Abu Khoussa	Men's 100 m	10.82	3 q	11.89	9	Did not advance			
Mayada Al-Sayad	Women's marathon	—N/a						2:42:28	67

== Equestrian ==
Palestine entered one rider into the Olympic equestrian competition by virtue of a top finish from Africa and the Middle East in the individual FEI Olympic rankings, signifying the nation's Olympic debut in the sport.

=== Individual Dressage ===
Athlete	Horse	Event	Grand Prix				Overall	
Athlete	Horse	Event	Score	Rank	Technical	Artistic	Score	Rank
Christian Zimmermann	Aramis 606	Dressage	62.271	57	Did Not Advance	Did Not Advance	63.271	57

== Judo ==
Palestine has received an invitation from the Tripartite Commission to send a judoka competing in the men's extra-lightweight category (60 kg) to the Olympics.

Athlete	Event	Round of 64	Round of 32	Round of 16	Quarterfinals	Semifinals	Repechage	Final / BM	
Athlete	Event	Opposition Result	Opposition Result	Opposition Result	Opposition Result	Opposition Result	Opposition Result	Opposition Result	Rank
Simon Yacoub	Men's −60 kg	Khyar (FRA); L 000–100	Did not advance						

== Swimming ==
Palestine has received a Universality invitation from FINA to send two swimmers (one male and one female) to the Olympics.

Athlete	Event	Heat		Semifinal		Final	
Athlete	Event	Time	Rank	Time	Rank	Time	Rank
Ahmed Gebrel	Men's 200 m freestyle	1:59:71	47	Did not advance			
Mary Al-Atrash	Women's 50 m freestyle	28.76	62	Did not advance			
