= Palestine at the 2017 World Championships in Athletics =

- WA code: PLE

in London
- Competitors: 2
- Medals: Gold 0 Silver 0 Bronze 0 Total 0

World Championships in Athletics appearances
- 1983; 1987; 1991; 1993; 1995; 1997; 1999; 2001; 2003; 2005; 2007; 2009; 2011; 2013; 2015; 2017; 2019; 2022; 2023

Palestine competed at the 2017 World Championships in Athletics in London, United Kingdom, from 4 to 13 August 2017.

== Results ==
(q – qualified, NM – no mark, SB – season best)

=== Men ===
Track and road events

Athlete	Event	Heat		Semifinal		Final	
Athlete	Event	Result	Rank	Result	Rank	Result	Rank
Wesam Almassri	800 metres	DNS	–	Did not advance			

=== Women ===
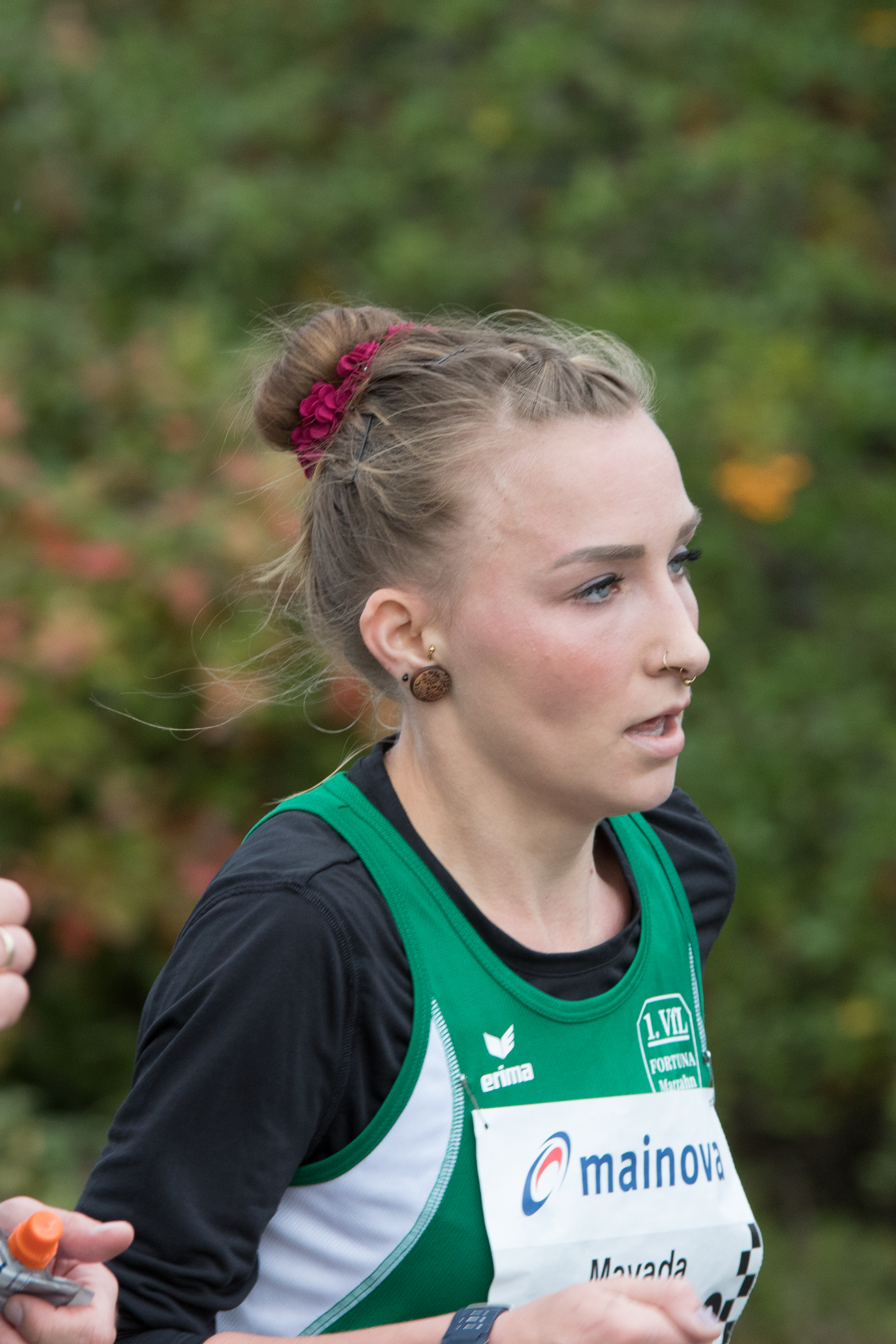
Mayada Al-Sayad

Track and road events

Athlete	Event	Final	
Athlete	Event	Result	Rank
Mayada Al-Sayad	Marathon	2:54:58 SB	68
