= Palestine at the 2008 Summer Olympics =

- Flag of Palestine
- IOC code: PLE
- NOC: Palestine Olympic Committee
- Website: www.poc.ps (in Arabic)

in Beijing
- Competitors: 4 in 2 sports
- Flag bearer: Nader Almassri
- Medals: Gold 0 Silver 0 Bronze 0 Total 0

Summer Olympics appearances (overview)
- 1996; 2000; 2004; 2008; 2012; 2016; 2020; 2024; 2028

The Palestinian Olympic Committee sent a team to compete at the 2008 Summer Olympics, held in Beijing, China, from 8 to 24 August. The delegation consisted of two runners and two swimmers, one of each sex in each sport. Olympic Solidarity, a programme of the International Olympic Committee which provides assistance to national Olympic committees, helped the Palestinian delegation to compete in these Olympics.

== Athletics ==
Key

- Note–Ranks given for track events are within the athlete's heat only
- Q = Qualified for the next round
- q = Qualified for the next round as a fastest loser or, in field events, by position without achieving the qualifying target
- NR = National record
- N/A = Round not applicable for the event
- Bye = Athlete not required to compete in round

Men

| Athlete | Event | Heat | | Final | |
| Athlete | Event | Result | Rank | Result | Rank |
|---|---|---|---|---|---|
| Nader al-Masri | 5000 m | 14:41.10 | 13 | did not advance | |

Nader al-Masri had to overcome several obstacles to compete in the Olympics. Since Hamas seized control of the Gaza Strip from Fatah in the 2007 Battle of Gaza, it has fought against Israel. Living and training in the Gaza Strip, al-Masri faced the ever-present danger of Israeli missiles and bullets. Also, Israel initially refused to allow him to leave Gaza to go to the Olympics, but Israeli human rights activists pressured the government into changing its mind. (However, when he sought to compete in the second Palestinian marathon in Bethlehem in 2014, he was denied permission to leave Gaza.)

Women

| Athlete | Event | Heat | | Quarterfinal | | Semifinal | | Final | |
| Athlete | Event | Result | Rank | Result | Rank | Result | Rank | Result | Rank |
|---|---|---|---|---|---|---|---|---|---|
| Ghadir Ghrouf | 100 m | 13.03 | 7 | did not advance | | | | | |

Ghadir Grouf was born with an ankle abnormality, which was not corrected until she was ten years old. She finished seventh in her heat and did not advance to the next round.

== Swimming ==
Men

| Athlete | Event | Heat | | Semifinal | | Final | |
| Athlete | Event | Time | Rank | Time | Rank | Time | Rank |
|---|---|---|---|---|---|---|---|
| Hamza Abdouh | 50 m freestyle | 25.60 | 73 | did not advance | | | |

Hamza Abdouh had to train in an 18-metre (59 ft)-long YMCA pool in East Jerusalem, when the Olympic-standard pool is 50 metres (160 ft) long.

Women

| Athlete | Event | Heat | | Semifinal | | Final | |
| Athlete | Event | Time | Rank | Time | Rank | Time | Rank |
|---|---|---|---|---|---|---|---|
| Zakiya Nassar | 50 m freestyle | 31.97 | 79 | Did not advance | | | |

Unlike Abdouh, Zakiya Nassar could only train on weekends. She lived and studied in the West Bank on weekdays and could only swim on weekends in Bethlehem.

Their swimming coach was Ibrahim Tawil.

== See also ==
- Palestine at the 2008 Summer Paralympics
