= Palestine at the 2022 World Athletics Championships =

Palestine at the 2022 World Championships in Athletics
- Flag of Palestine
- WA code: PLE

in Eugene, Oregon 24 July 2022
- Competitors: 1

World Championships in Athletics appearances
- 1983; 1987; 1991; 1993; 1995; 1997; 1999; 2001; 2003; 2005; 2007; 2009; 2011; 2013; 2015; 2017; 2019; 2022; 2023

Palestine competed at the 2022 World Athletics Championships in Eugene, United States, from 15 to 24 July 2022.

== Results ==
Palestine entered 1 athletes.

=== Women ===
Track and road events

Athlete	Event	Heat		Semi-final		Final	
Athlete	Event	Result	Rank	Result	Rank	Result	Rank
Hanna Barakat	200 metres	26.33	43	did not advance			
