= 2023 Asian Athletics Championships – Women's 1500 metres =

Women's 1500 metres at the 2023 Asian Athletics Championships
- Venue: National Stadium
- Location: Bangkok, Thailand
- Dates: 12 July
- Competitors: 11 from 10 nations
- Winning time: 4:06.75 CR

Medalists
gold medal	Nozomi Tanaka	Japan
silver medal	Yume Goto	Japan
bronze medal	Gayanthika Abeyratne	Sri Lanka

The women's 1500 metres event at the 2023 Asian Athletics Championships was held on 12 July.

== Records ==
Records before the 2023 Asian Athletics Championships
Record	Athlete (nation)	Time (s)	Location	Date
World record	Faith Kipyegon (KEN)	3:49.11	Florence, Italy	2 June 2023
Asian record	Qu Yunxia (CHN)	3:50.46	Beijing, China	11 September 1993
Championship record	Miho Sugimori (JPN)	4:12.69	Incheon, South Korea	1 September 2005
World leading	Faith Kipyegon (KEN)	3:49.11	Florence, Italy	2 June 2023
Asian leading	K. M. Deeksha (IND)	4:06.07	Bhubaneswar, India	16 June 2023

== Results ==
Rank	Name	Nationality	Time	Notes
1st place, gold medalist(s)	Nozomi Tanaka	Japan	4:06.75	SB
2nd place, silver medalist(s)	Yume Goto	Japan	4:13.25	SB
3rd place, bronze medalist(s)	Gayanthika Abeyratne	Sri Lanka	4:14.39	
4	Xu Shuangshuang	China	4:18.84	
5	Nguyễn Thị Oanh	Vietnam	4:18.84	
6	Layla Almasri	Palestine	4:25.70	
7	Lili Das	India	4:27.61	
8	Chui Ling Goh	Singapore	4:31.28	
9	Savinder Kaur Joginder Singh	Malaysia	4:32.75	
10	Lodkeo Inthakoumman	Laos	4:39.74	
11	Phulmati Rana	Nepal	4:49.72	
