= Wasim Abusal =

Palestinian boxer (born 2004)

Personal information
- Nationality: Palestinian
- Born: 14 June 2004 (age 22) Ramallah, Palestine
- Home town: Ramallah, Palestine
- Height: 1.73 m (5 ft 8 in)

Sport
- Country: Palestine
- Sport: Boxing
- Weight class: Featherweight (−57 kg)
- Club: ElBarrio Gym
- Coached by: Ahmad Harara; Nader Jayousi
Medal record
Men's boxing
Representing Palestine
Arab Games
Bronze medal – third place	2023 Algeria	Featherweight
- Updated on 2 August 2026

Wasim Abusal (Note: Also found as Waseem Abu Sal or Saal.) OLY (Arabic: وسيم أبو سل, romanized: Wasīm Abū Sall; born 14 June 2004) is a Palestinian featherweight boxer. He competed at the 2024 Paris Olympics.

== Career ==
Abusal started boxing at the age of 12 in his hometown of Ramallah, encouraged by his father.

He competed in the featherweight category at the 2022 Asian Games in China, finishing 9th. In 2023, he took part in the IBA World Boxing Championships in Uzbekistan. He then won a bronze medal in his category at the 2023 Arab Games in Algeria.

Despite not qualifying from the world tournament, Abusal was given a wildcard to represent Palestine at the 2024 Summer Olympics in Paris, France, becoming the first Palestinian boxer to compete at an Olympic event. He was eliminated during the round of 32. He also served as Olympic flagbearer for his country alongside swimmer Valerie Tarazi at the opening ceremony.

Abu Sal represented his country in the 55 kg category at the 6th Islamic Solidarity Games in Riyadh, Saudi Arabia, in November 2025.

=== Training ===
Abusal welcomed the IOC's decision to invite him to the 2024 Olympics, with his coaches lamenting the obstacles posed to his training and competition schedule by the Israeli occupation of Palestine and the Gaza war. His main coach, Cairo-based Gazan Ahmad Harara, follows his training via remote connection due to the inability to travel to the West Bank with a Gaza ID, and only meets him during international competitions. Because of movement restrictions within the West Bank and the weakness of the Palestinian passport, Abusal is also unable to meet regularly with boxing partners of his weight, with the only other boxer in Ramallah weighing 71 kg, and to attend all tournaments in Palestine and abroad. The last part of his Olympic training took place in Allonnes, Sarthe.
