= Layla Almasri =

Palestinian-American athlete (born 1999)

Personal information
- Born: 26 June 1999 (age 27) Colorado Springs, Colorado, U.S.
- Home town: Colorado Springs, Colorado, U.S.
- Education: University of Colorado
- Height: 1.65 m (5 ft 5 in)

Sport
- Country: Palestine
- Sport: Athletics
- Events: 800 metres; 1500 metres; 5000 metres
- College team: UCCS Mountain Lions
- Turned pro: 2023

Layla Almasri (/ælˈmɑːsri/ al-MAHSS-ree; Arabic: ليلى المصري, Palestinian pronunciation: [ˈleːlæ lˈmˤɑsˤri]; born 26 June 1999) is a Palestinian-American athlete specializing in middle-distance and long-distance running. In 2024, she received an invitation from the International Olympic Committee to represent Palestine in the 800 meters event at the 2024 Summer Olympics.

== Early life ==
Almasri was born in Colorado Springs, Colorado, to a family from Nablus, West Bank. She started running as a young child, taking part in running clubs and joining her middle school's track team.

She attended the University of Colorado Colorado Springs from 2017 to 2023, studying biomedical sciences and pursuing a career as a medical sonographer.

== Career ==
Almasri joined her university's track and field club, the UCCS Mountain Lions, and ran cross-country. She later became assistant coach.

In March 2023, she began running under the Palestinian flag, and in June 2023, she won the bronze medal in the 1500 meters at the 2023 Arab Athletics Championships in Marrakech. In July 2023, she finished 6th in the 1500 meters at the Asian Athletics Championships. She competed at the 2024 World Athletics Cross Country Championships.

At the 2024 Summer Olympics, she set a new national record for Palestine in the 800 metres during her heat, but failed to advance.

== Personal bests ==
- 800 metres – 2:12.21 (Paris 2024) NR
  - Indoor – 2:16.71 (Colorado Springs 2021)
- 1500 metres – 4:20.05 (Murfreesboro 2024) NR
- Mile – 4:41.66 (Saint Louis 2023) NR
  - Indoor – 4:50.53 (Topeka 2022)
- 3000 metres – 9:38.11i (Topeka 2023)
- 5000 metres – 16:00.80 (Los Angeles 2024) NR
