= Rami Deeb =

Palestinian racewalker (born 1977)

Rami Abdelhadi Al-Deeb (born 14 June 1977) is a retired racewalker athlete who competed internationally for Palestine. He represented Palestine at the 2000 Summer Olympics in Sydney. He competed in the 20 kilometres walk and was the flag bearer for his country.
