= Palestine at the 2023 World Athletics Championships =

- Flag of Palestine
- WA code: PLE

in Budapest, Hungary 19 August 2023 – 27 August 2023
- Competitors: 1 (1 man and 0 women)
- Medals: Gold 0 Silver 0 Bronze 0 Total 0

World Athletics Championships appearances
- 1983; 1987; 1991; 1993; 1995; 1997; 1999; 2001; 2003; 2005; 2007; 2009; 2011; 2013; 2015; 2017; 2019; 2022; 2023

Palestine competed at the 2023 World Athletics Championships in Budapest, Hungary, which were held from 19 to 27 August 2023. The athlete delegation of the country was composed of one competitor, middle-distance runner Mohammed Dwedar who would compete in the men's 800 metres. Dwedar qualified upon being selected by the Palestine Athletic Federation. Dwedar placed last out of the other competitors that competed in his heat and did not advance to the semifinals, though set a new personal best in the event.

== Background ==
The 2023 World Athletics Championships in Budapest, Hungary, were held from 19 to 27 August 2023. The Championships were held at the National Athletics Centre. To qualify for the World Championships, athletes had to reach an entry standard (e.g. time or distance), place in a specific position at select competitions, be a wild card entry, or qualify through their World Athletics Ranking at the end of the qualification period.

As Oman did not meet any of the four standards, they could send either one male or one female athlete in one event of the Championships who has not yet qualified. The Palestine Athletic Federation selected middle-distance runner Mohammed Dwedar who had made his professional debut earlier that year at the 2023 Arab Athletics Championships.

== Results ==
Key

- Q = Qualified for the next round
- q = Qualified for the next round as a fastest loser or, in field events, by position without achieving the qualifying target
- NR = National record
- PB = Personal best
- SB = Season best
- N/A = Round not applicable for the event

=== Men ===
Dwedar competed in the heats of the men's 800 metres on 22 August against eight other competitors. He raced in the last heat, the seventh heat, and recorded a time of 1:55.45 for a new personal best in the event. Though he set a personal record, he placed last in his heat and did not advance further to the semifinals.

Track and road events

Athlete	Event	Heat		Semifinal		Final	
Athlete	Event	Result	Rank	Result	Rank	Result	Rank
Mohammed Dwedar	800 metres	1:55.45 PB	9	Did not advance			
