= Abdalsalam Al-Dabaji =

Palestinian middle-distance runner

Personal information
- Nationality: Palestine
- Born: 12 April 1979 (age 47) Gaza, Palestine

Sport
- Sport: Athletics
- Event: 800 m

Abdal Salam Al-Dabaji (born 24 April 1979 in Gaza) is a retired athlete who competed internationally for Palestine. He represented Palestine at the 2004 Summer Olympics in Athens. He competed in the 800 metres where he finished 8th in his heat and so failed to advance.
