= Mohammed Hamada =

Palestinian weightlifter (born 2002)

Personal information
- Nationality: Palestinian
- Born: Mohammed Khamis Haidar Hamada; 14 March 2002 (age 24) Gaza, Palestine
- Weight: 101.35 kg (223.4 lb)

Sport
- Country: Palestine
- Sport: Weightlifting
- Events: 96 kg, 102 kg
Medal record
Men's weightlifting
Representing Palestine
Event	1st	2nd	3rd
Junior World Championships	1	0	1
Total	1	0	1
Junior World Championships
Gold medal – first place	2022 Heraklion	–102 kg
Bronze medal – third place	2022 Heraklion	–102 kg

Mohammed Khamis Haidar Hamada (Arabic: محمد خميس حيدر حمادة; born 14 March 2002) is a Palestinian weightlifter from Gaza. He was the first Palestinian to compete in the sport at the Olympics.

== Career ==
Hamada participated in the men's 96-kilogram event at the 2020 Tokyo Olympics, making him the first-ever weightlifter from Palestine to compete at the Olympics. He finished 13th.

Hamada left Gaza several weeks before the Olympics to avoid traveling issues, having secured his place after participating in six international qualifying contests since 2019. His brother Hussam is the Palestinian national weightlifting team coach.

He was the flag bearer of Palestine's Olympic National Team during the 2020 Tokyo Summer Olympics.

In 2022, Hamada won gold and bronze in the IWF Weightlifting Junior World Championships held in Heraklion, Greece.

In 2024, Hamada injured his knee and lost around 20 kg (44 lb) carrying water during the ongoing Gaza war and Gaza genocide. He thus failed to qualify for the 2024 Summer Olympics in Paris. A documentary film chronicles his journey during the Gaza genocide, which included having to eat animal feed to survive.
