= Palestine at the Olympics =

- IOC code: PLE
- NOC: Palestine Olympic Committee
- Website: www.poc.ps (in Arabic)
- Medals: Gold 0 Silver 0 Bronze 0 Total 0

Summer appearances
- 1996; 2000; 2004; 2008; 2012; 2016; 2020; 2024; 2028

Palestine has sent athletes to compete at each Summer Olympic Games since its debut in 1996. The nation has not competed at the Winter Olympic Games, and no Palestinian athletes have ever won an Olympic medal.

== History ==
=== Mandatory Palestine ===
Mandatory Palestine had a National Olympic Committee, which was formed in 1933 and recognized by the International Olympic Committee in 1934, though it never competed at the Olympic Games.

=== Olympic recognition ===
Palestine has been recognized as a member of the Olympic Council of Asia (OCA) since 1986. Palestine's National Olympic Committee was created in 1976 and given partial recognition by the International Olympic Committee in September 1993.

The nation made its debut in the 1996 Summer Olympics in Atlanta, USA, represented by a single athlete: Majed Abu Maraheel, who finished last in his heat in the 10,000 meter race. Since then, it has sent more than one athlete to every Summer Olympics.

=== 2024 Olympics ===
Concerns were raised about the ability Palestinian athletes to compete in the 2024 Paris Olympics due to repercussions of the Gaza War, including destruction of sporting facilities and the deaths of athletes by Israeli attacks. A 2024 article by The Guardian stated at least 85 Palestinian athletes had been killed since the beginning of the war, including Hani Al-Masdar, general manager of Palestine's national Olympic football team, and Nagham Abu Samra, a karateka who was expected to compete in the event.

Despite this, eight athletes from across the globe competed under the Palestine flag at the 2024 Summer Olympics, the most of any Games up to that point.

== Medal tables ==
=== Medals by Summer Games ===
Games	Athletes	Gold	Silver	Bronze	Total	Rank
1996 Atlanta	1	0	0	0	0	–
2000 Sydney	2	0	0	0	0	–
2004 Athens	3	0	0	0	0	–
2008 Beijing	4	0	0	0	0	–
2012 London	5	0	0	0	0	–
2016 Rio de Janeiro	6	0	0	0	0	–
2020 Tokyo	5	0	0	0	0	–
2024 Paris	8	0	0	0	0	–
2028 Los Angeles	future event					
2032 Brisbane	future event					
Total		0	0	0	0	–

== Olympic participants ==
=== Summer Olympics ===
Sport	1996	2000	2004	2008	2012	2016	2020	2024	Athletes
Athletics	1	1	2	2	2	2	1	2	14
Boxing								1	1
Equestrian						1			1
Judo					1	1	1	1	4
Shooting								1	1
Swimming		1	1	2	2	2	2	2	12
Taekwondo								1	1
Weightlifting							1		1
Total	1	2	3	4	5	6	5	8	35

== See also ==
- List of flag bearers for Palestine at the Olympics
- Palestine at the Paralympics
- Palestine Olympic Committee
