= Lions' Gate stabbings =

2015 incident in Jerusalem, Israel

Lions' Gate stabbing
- Part of the Israeli–Palestinian conflict (2015)
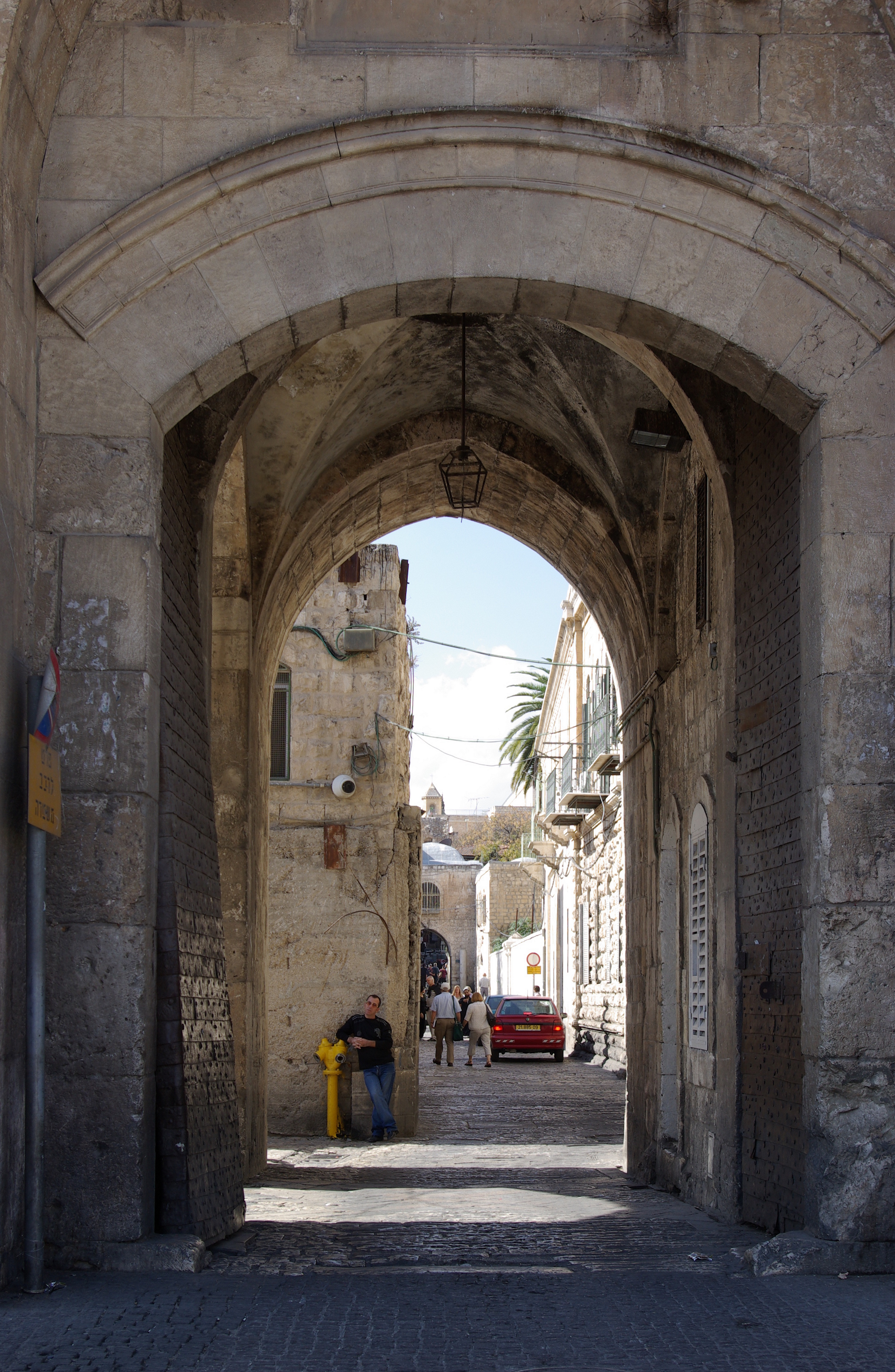
- View of Lions' Gate

- The attack site
- Location: 31°46′51″N 35°14′13″E; Jerusalem
- Date: 3 October 2015
- Attack type: Stabbing
- Deaths: 2 (+1 attacker)
- Injuries: 2
- Assailant: Muhanad Shafeq Halabi

On 3 October 2015, a Palestinian resident of al-Bireh attacked the Benita family near the Lions' Gate in Jerusalem, as they were on their way to the Western Wall to pray. The attacker murdered Aaron Benita, the father of the family, and injured the mother Adele and their 2-year-old son Matan. Nehemia Lavi, a resident who heard screams and came to help was also murdered and his gun taken by the assailant. The attacker, 19 year old Muhanad Shafeq Halabi was shot and killed by police as he was firing on pedestrians.

Adele described Arab residents standing by and laughing as she was attacked, and telling her to "drop dead" when she pleaded for help for her son.

This attack and another stabbing attack, both of which took place during a religious festival that draws many Jews to the holy places in Jerusalem, resulted in Israeli authorities temporarily barring Arab residents of East Jerusalem from entering the walled Old City.

== Background ==
The attack came during the 2015–2016 wave of violence in Israeli-Palestinian conflict regarded by The Guardian as having begun in mid-September when a number of Palestinians "repeatedly barricaded themselves inside the al-Aqsa mosque and hurled stones, firebombs and fireworks at the police." This series of attacks against Israeli Jews is notable for consisting of what are being called "grassroots" attacks, often involving the throwing of Molotov cocktails and rocks, lone wolf terrorism, stabbings and vehicular assault as a terrorist tactic. This is taking place during a period when terror attacks sponsored by organizations have declined. This period has also seen the increasing prevalence of Jewish "price tag" operations, such as the arson attack that murdered three members of the Dawabsheh family in the West Bank village of Duma about two months ago.

Opinions about underlying causes of the stabbings vary. The Israel Ministry of Foreign Affairs attributes the stabbings to "incitement" by both radical Islamists and Palestinian government leaders, and, in particular, untruths being circulated about Israeli actions and false assertions that Israel intends to change the Status quo on the Temple Mount. According to The Guardian, many analysts regard the issue of access to what is known to Muslims as al-Haram al-Sharif, or the Noble Sanctuary, and to Jews as the Temple Mount, as key to the recent increase in tension in Jerusalem. A campaign by some fundamentalist Jews and their supporters, with the backing of some members of the Israeli cabinet, demanding greater rights for Jewish worship at the site has raised the suspicion, despite repeated Israeli denials, that Israel intends to change the 'precarious status quo' for the site. Writing in The Atlantic, Jeffrey Goldberg points to "Muslim supersessionism", the refusal of many Muslims to acknowledge that the Temple Mount is also holy to other faiths, and a parallel unwillingness to recognize that "Jews are a people who are indigenous to the land" of Israel.

== 3 October stabbing ==
Aaron and Adele Benita and their two small children in strollers, were on their way to the Western Wall to pray, when 19 year old Muhanad Shafeq Halabi from Al-Bireh started attacking and stabbing them, killing Aaron, critically wounding Adele and wounding 2 year old Matan, then stabbed Rabbi Nehemia Lavie who, hearing them scream for help, ran out of his house and tried to help them. During the assault, the attacker took a pistol from Lavie, and fired at pedestrians, until he was shot and killed by a police officer who had rushed to the scene.

Adele Benita described the horror of being stabbed, trying to help her husband, and screaming for help while, "There were lots of Arabs around looking ... laughing and smiling..." Benita told the New York Times that she, "Screamed, I begged for aid," but, "They stood chatting and laughing — they spat at me." As she ran past them to find help, Arab onlookers "spat at me and slapped me in the face. While the knife was still stuck in me they slapped me and laughed at me." As she pleaded for help, one of the Arab bystanders told her to, "drop dead."

=== Video ===
Reuters broadcast video of the murders.

=== Victims ===
The dead were Aharon Benita, 21, and Nehemia Lavie, 41, who attempted to come to the couple's rescue.

Lavie was a rabbi and military reserve officer who had lived for 23 years in the street where he was stabbed to death. The Lavies are one of about 70 Jewish families who live outside the Jewish Quarter of the Old City, mostly in the Muslim Quarter, which used to be a mixed neighborhood until the 1929 Palestine riots.

Adele Banita and her small son were injured, Adele wounded seriously with stab wounds. Visiting Mrs. Benita in hospital along with Minister of Public Security Gilad Erdan, Prime Minister Benjamin Netanyahu said: "Let's make this clear,"... "just as we’ve smashed previous waves of terrorism, we will also smash this wave of terrorism."

=== Assailant ===
The attacker was Muhannad Halabi, 19. He was a resident of East Jerusalem and a law student at Al Quds University. He is said to have been distraught over the death of a fellow student, Dia Talahma, 21, who died when a grenade he was throwing at Israeli troops exploded too soon. Halabi has been called "the lion," and "the thunder" that unleashed the new uprising, on some Facebook pages.

Before attacking, he wrote on his Facebook page, "What's happening to our holy places? What's happening to our mothers and sisters in the Al-Aqsa mosque? We are not the people who accept humiliation. Our people will revolt." And, "the third intifada has begun".

== Copycat attacks ==
This widely publicized attack is understood to have "quickly sparked a spate of similar assaults."

=== Subsequent October stabbings at the Lions Gate ===
On 4 October a male Palestinian teenager attacked 15-year-old Israeli Moshe Malka with a knife, wounding him before being shot and killed by police. The attacker was identified by relatives as Fadi Alloun (alt.: Alon), 19. Before attacking, he posted on his Facebook page: "Either martyrdom or victory." Palestinians cast doubts on the Israeli report that Alon tried to stab a Jew. Based on a video they claimed that a group of Jews attacked him and called on the police to shoot him without reason. According to the New York Times, the video shows Alon fleeing after he had, "stabbed and wounded," the 15-year-old Jewish boy, with Israeli civilians chasing him and yelling, "Shoot him!" Release of Alon's body for burial was delayed by Israel authorities after mourners called him a "martyr," and declared that his funeral would be, "a national celebration." Israel agreed to release the body for burial by a strictly limited number of mourners.

On 6 October, an 18-year-old woman attacked an Israeli man with a knife near the Lions' Gate. The victim was able to draw his gun and shoot his attacker. Both were hospitalized; both were expected to live. The attacker was Shurooq Dweiyat, 18, from the Palestinian neighborhood of Sur Baher, a student at Bethlehem University who began collecting donations for the families of "“martyrs" the week before she stabbed an Israeli. On the morning of the attack, she told friends that she was cutting class to pray at the Al Aqsa mosque. A video circulating widely among Palestinians shows Dweiyat being pounced on after the stabbing by police who found two knives in her possession; it does not show her stabbing the policeman. Ma'an news agency reported that witnesses saw an Israeli man opened fire at the teenager in the al-Wad Street in the Old City, a few meters away from the Council Gate leading to Al-Aqsa Mosque. They said she was assaulted by the Israeli man and subsequently was not found to have any sharp objects on her person.

On 12 October an Arab man approaching the Gate from the cemeteries outside the walls was asked to remove his hands from his pockets by police. He pulled out a knife and attacked the police officer, fellow officers quickly shot the assailant. The officer who was attacked was saved from harm by his bulletproof vest.

== Response ==
- Israel: Israelis PM Benjamin Netanyahu said: "They want a third intifada? They'll get Defensive Shield 2".
- United Nations: Special Coordinator for the Middle East Peace Process Nickolay Mladenov stated, "I condemn the brutal terror attack that killed two Israelis in Jerusalem, call on all to stand firm against incitement, prevent escalation."
- United Nations: United Nations Secretary-General Ban Ki-moon issued a statement: "The Secretary-General condemns in the strongest terms the attacks on Saturday, 3 October in the Old City of Jerusalem, including the killing of two members of an Israeli family and injuries to Israelis and Palestinians in subsequent incidents in various neighborhoods in Jerusalem."
- United States's State Department said :"We call for all perpetrators of violence to be swiftly brought to justice, we are concerned about mounting tensions in the West Bank and Jerusalem, including the Haram al Sharif/Temple Mount, and call on all sides to take affirmative steps to restore calm and avoid escalating the situation."
- Palestinian Authority spokesman Ihab Bseiso said: "The only solution is the end of the Israeli occupation of our occupied Palestinian land and the establishment of our independent state on the 1967 borders with Jerusalem as its capital."

== Impact ==
In response to the 3 October Lions' Gate stabbing, as well as the 4 October stabbing of a 15-year-old Israeli, the Israeli government temporarily barred Palestinians from entering the walled Old City of Jerusalem for 2 days beginning 4 October. The ban was intended to protect visitors to the city during the Jewish holiday Sukkot. Palestinians who lived, studied or worked in the Old City were exempted form the ban. The ban was lifted on 6 October.

Israeli security "flooded" the streets of the Old City following the first stabbing attack, according to a report in Haaretz. Dozens of protesters demonstrated against the restrictions near the Al-Aqsa mosque before being dispersed by Israeli forces, with several injured due to smoke inhalation. Businesses in the Muslim Quarter and East Jerusalem schools declared a strike.

On 8 October, after the broader ban was lifted, Jerusalem police announced that Muslim men under the age of 50 would be barred from entering the Temple Mount during Friday prayers, with no restrictions on Muslim women. Prime Minister Netanyahu also announced a ban on both Arab and Jewish politicians entering the site in an effort to reduce tensions.
