= Olympic Day =

Annual international holiday on 23 June

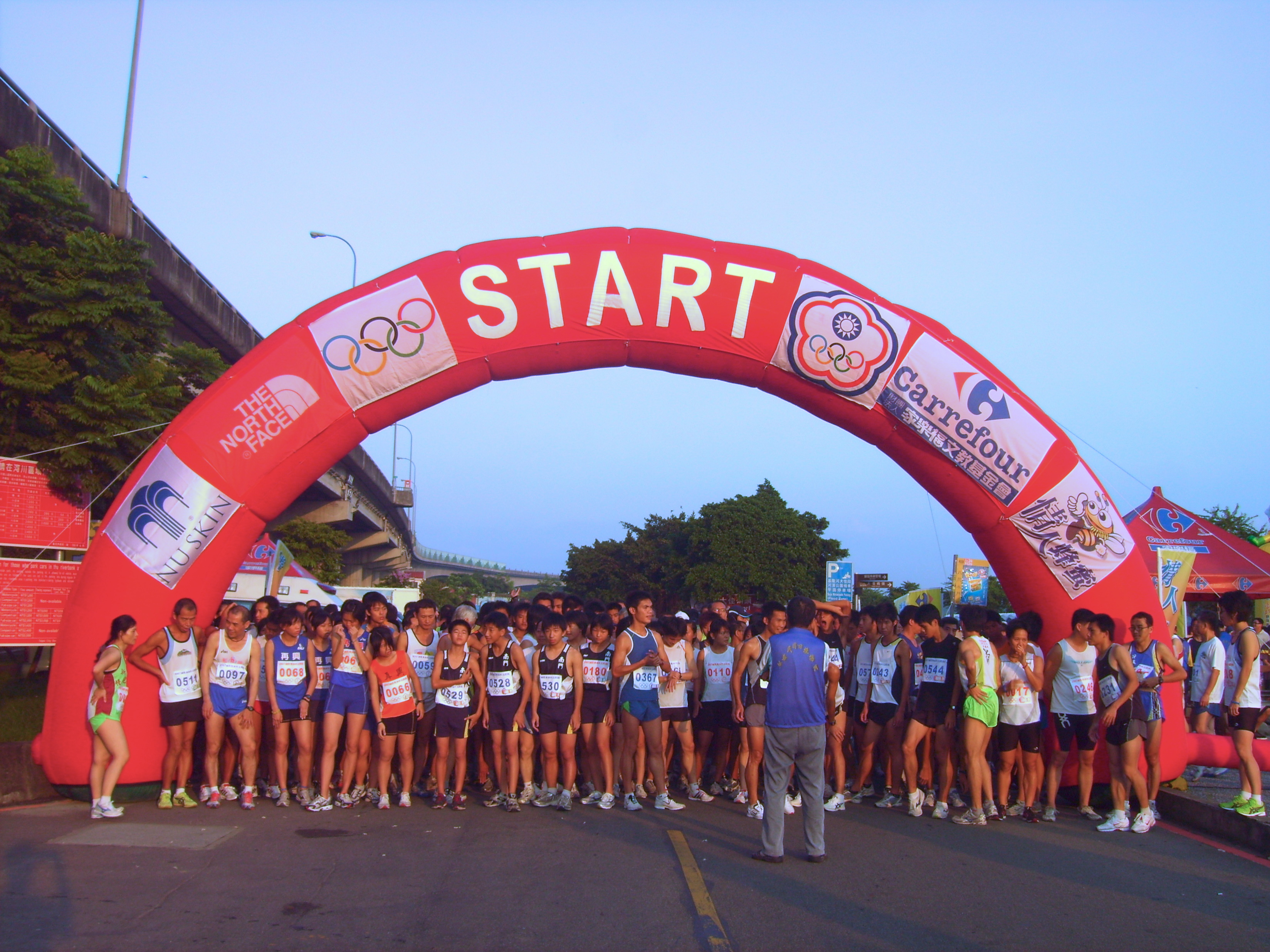
Start line of the 2007 Chinese Taipei Olympic Day Run

Olympic Day is an annual holiday celebrated on June 23 worldwide to commemorate the foundation of the International Olympic Committee and the modern Olympic Games. Olympic Day was established by the IOC in 1948 and commemorated by IOC president J. Sigfrid Edström. That year, celebrations and athletic events were held by the National Olympic Committees of Portugal, Greece, Austria, Canada, Switzerland, Great Britain, Uruguay, Venezuela and Belgium.

In 1978, the IOC officially recommended for all NOCs to host yearly Olympic Day celebrations. In 1987, the Olympic Day Run was established as a core activity of Olympic Day to promote athleticism around the world.
