= Mohammed Barakat (field hockey) =

American hockey player

Personal information
- Full name: Mohammed Adel Barakat
- Nationality: American
- Born: March 3, 1967 (age 59) [Palestine

Sport
- Country: United States
- Sport: Field hockey

Mohammed Adel Barakat (born March 3, 1967) is an American field hockey player. He competed in the men's tournament at the 1984 Summer Olympics.

Los Angeles-born Palestinian Olympic runner Hanna Barakat is Jennifer Stoller's and his daughter. Hanna Barakat's brother Adam has played American football for Bucknell University.
