= Woroud Sawalha =

Palestinian middle-distance runner

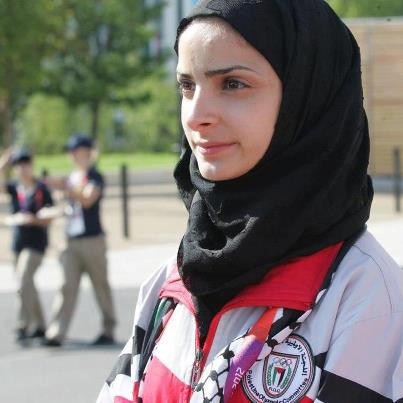
- Woroud Sawalha.

Personal information
- Nationality: Palestinian
- Born: 11 March 1991 (age 35) Asira ash-Shamaliya, West Bank, Palestine
- Weight: 104 lb (47 kg)

Sport
- Country: Palestine
- Sport: Track
- Event: Women's 800m

Woroud Sawalha (Arabic: الورود صوالحة) from Asira ash-Shamaliya is a Palestinian Olympic athlete. She is one of two runners, along with Bahaa Al Farra, among five athletes who represented Palestine in the 2012 Olympics. She competed in the women's 800m, placing last in her heat. She was also the flag bearer at the closing ceremony. Due to Palestine's lack of training facilities, she and al-Farra often travelled to Qatar, Egypt, and Jordan to train for the Olympics.
