= Sanna Abubkheet =

Palestinian middle-distance runner

Personal information
- Nationality: Palestine
- Born: 7 December 1984 (age 41) Deir al-Balah, Palestine
- Height: 1.57 m (5 ft 2 in)
- Weight: 52 kg (115 lb)

Sport
- Sport: Athletics
- Event: Middle distance running

Achievements and titles
- Personal best: 800 m: 2:31.50 (2006)

Sanna Abubkheet (Arabic: سناء أبو بخيت; born December 7, 1984, in Deir al-Balah) is a retired female Palestinian middle-distance runner, who specialized in the 800 metres. Abubkheet qualified for the Palestinian squad in the women's 800 metres at the 2004 Summer Olympics in Athens by receiving a wild card entry slot from IAAF. Running against seven other athletes in heat three, Abubkheet crossed the finish line by more than half a minute behind leader and top medal favorite Kelly Holmes of Great Britain with a seventh-place time in 2:32.10. Abubkheet failed to advance into the semifinals as she placed farther from two automatic slots for the next round and ranked no. 42 overall in the prelims. Building a historic milestone as the first female athlete from Gaza Strip to compete at the Olympics, Abubkheet was appointed by the Palestine Olympic Committee to carry the nation's flag in the opening ceremony.
