= Hanna Barakat =

Palestinian-American runner

Personal information
- Nationality: Palestine
- Born: Hanna Barakat; September 1, 1999 (age 27) Los Angeles, California, U.S.

Sport
- Sport: Athletics
- Event: 100 metres

Hanna Barakat (Arabic: هناء بركات; born September 1, 1999) is a Los Angeles-born Palestinian-American runner. Barakat is a former student-athlete at Brown University.

== Early life and education ==
Barakat was born in Los Angeles, California, U.S. Her father Mohammed Barakat competed for the United States at the 1984 Summer Olympics in the sport of field hockey. Her brother Adam has played American football for Bucknell University in Lewisburg, Pennsylvania.

She competed in track & field at Flintridge Preparatory School in California.

== Career ==
Barakat holds the Palestinian national records in the 100, 200, and 400-meter sprints.

Barakat was one of five Palestinians representing the country at the 2020 Tokyo Olympics. She competed in the women's 100-meter sprint where she set the national record running a time of 12.16 seconds.
