= Ghadir Ghrouf =

Palestinian sprinter

Ghadir Ghrouf (Arabic: غدير غروف; born September 12, 1990, in Jericho) is a track and field sprint athlete who competes internationally for Palestine. She is of distant African immigrant descent.

Ghrouf represented Palestine at the 2008 Summer Olympics in Beijing. She competed in the women's 100 metre sprint and placed seventh in her heat without advancing to the second round. She ran the distance in a time of 13.07 seconds.

She was born handicapped with a deformation of the ankles which made it difficult for her to walk; this was not corrected until she was ten years old. Soon thereafter, she took an interest in sprinting, and began regular training. Between 2003 and 2007, she became Palestine's national champion for her age category in the women's 100m, 200m and 400m sprints. In 2006, she was the youngest competitor at the indoor athletics championships in Moscow.
