= Maher Abu Rmeileh =

Olympic judoka of Palestine

Maher Abu Rmilah
Personal information
- Native name: ماهر أبو رميلة
- Nationality: Palestinian
- Born: August 24, 1983 (age 42) Jerusalem, Palestine
- Occupation: Judoka
- Weight: 158 lb (72 kg)

Sport
- Country: Palestine
- Sport: Judo

Profile at external databases
- JudoInside.com: 43504

Maher Abu Rmeileh (Arabic: ماهر أبو رميلة; born 24 August 1983 in Jerusalem) is a Palestinian judoka.

He carried the Palestinian flag at the opening ceremony at the 2012 Summer Olympics, and was the inaugural Palestinian to qualify for the Olympics on merit.

After receiving a bye in the first round, he lost in the second round 0000–0100 to Dirk Van Tichelt.
