= Nader al-Masri =

Palestinian long-distance runner

Nader al-Masri (Arabic: نادر المصري; born January 26, 1980) is a Palestinian Olympic athlete from Beit Hanoun in the Gaza Strip. He participated in the 5,000-metre race at the 2008 Olympics in Beijing, China. He was the only person from the Gaza Strip and one of the only four Palestinians who participated in the Olympics in 2008. For several months, Israel refused his request to pass through Israel to train elsewhere; Israeli officials subsequently granted him a permit in April 2008. He finished in 39th place. In 2015 he won the Palestine Marathon after runners from Gaza were permitted by Israel to attend the event for the first (and so far only) time.
