= Bahaa al-Farra =

Palestinian sprinter

Bahaa al-Faraa
Personal information
- Nationality: Palestinian
- Born: 10 March 1991 (age 34) Palestine
- Height: 1.75 m (5 ft 9 in)
- Weight: 143 lb (65 kg)

Sport
- Country: Palestine
- Sport: Track
- Event: Men's 400m

Bahaa al-Farra (Arabic: بهاء الفرا; born 10 March 1991) is a Palestinian runner from Gaza. He competed at the 2012 Summer Olympics in the 400 m event, posting a time of 49.93 seconds and was eliminated in the first round. Along with Woroud Sawalha, he was one of two runners representing Palestine.
