= Mayada Al-Sayad =

Palestinian long-distance runner

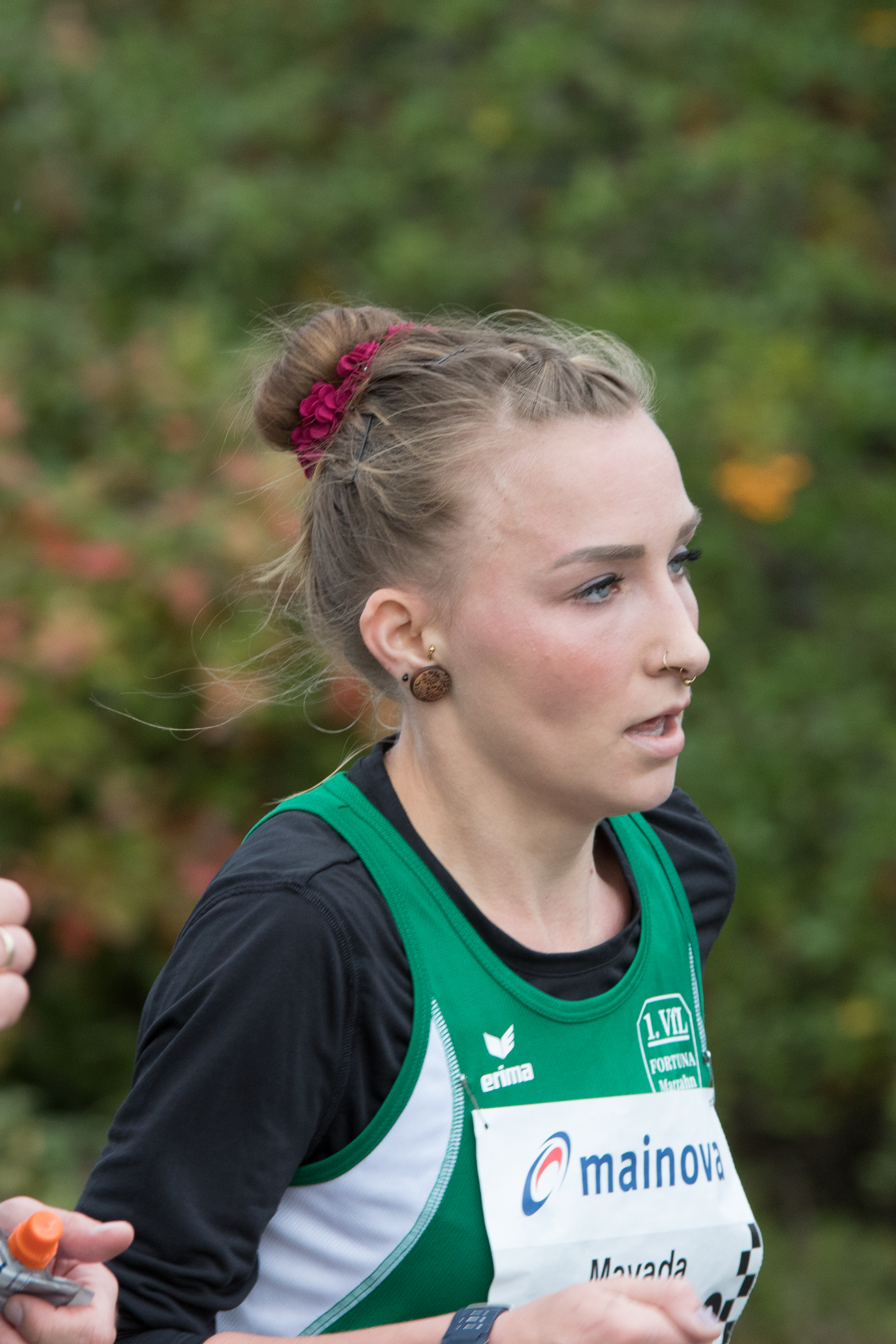
- Al-Sayad in 2017

Personal information
- Born: 26 October 1992 (age 33) Berlin, Germany

Sport
- Country: Palestine
- Sport: Women's athletics
- Event: Marathon

Achievements and titles
- Personal best: 2:39:28 (2019)
- Updated on 17 June 2024

Mayada Al-Sayad (Arabic: ميادة الصياد; born 26 October 1992 in Berlin) is a German-born Palestinian long-distance runner. She competed in the marathon at the 2015 World Championships and at the 2016 Olympics, where she finished 50th and was the Palestinian flag bearer in the opening ceremony. In 2017 she participated in the World Championships held in London, placing 68th in the Marathon, with a time of 2:54:58, her season's best.

Al-Sayad was born to a Palestinian father and a German mother, and has dual citizenship. She works as an assistant to her father, who is a dental technician.

Al-Sayad holds the Palestinian national records in the 800m, 3000m, 5000m, 10,000m, half-marathon, and marathon.

== See also ==
- Palestine at the 2015 World Championships in Athletics
- Palestine at the 2016 Summer Olympics
