= Palestine Athletic Federation =

Governing body of athletics in Palestine

- الاتحاد الفلسطيني لألعاب القوى
- Sport: Athletics
- Jurisdiction: State of Palestine
- Abbreviation: PAF
- Founded: 29 January 1964
- Regional affiliation: Arab Athletics Federation
- President: Nader Ismael Halawa

Official website
- www.paf.ps
- (Palestine)

The Palestine Athletic Federation (Arabic: الاتحاد الفلسطيني لألعاب القوى) is the governing body for the sport of athletics in the State of Palestine. The organisation is maintained by the PLE Olympic Committee headquartered at Al Nazir Street, in Gaza City. It is a member of the Arab Athletics Federation, and holds tasks such as providing track suits for male and female Palestinian athletes that compete at outdoor and indoor track and field events, their transportation costs and sports equipment.

== See also ==
- European Athletic Association
