= Palestine Olympic Committee =

Olympic committee of Palestine

- Country: Palestine
- Code: PLE
- Created: 1969; 57 years ago
- Recognized: 1993
- Continental Association: OCA
- Headquarters: Ramallah, State of Palestine
- President: Jibril Mahmoud Muhammad Rajoub
- Secretary General: Bader Aqel
- Website: poc.ps

The Palestine Olympic Committee (Arabic: اللجنة الأولمبية الفلسطينية, romanized: al-Lajna l-Ūlimbiyya l-Filasṭīniyya; IOC Code: PLE) is the National Olympic Committee of the State of Palestine. The State of Palestine has been recognized as a member of the Olympic Council of Asia (OCA) since 1986, and the International Olympic Committee (IOC) since 1993.

== History ==
In 1933 the Palestine National Olympic Committee was officially formed, and was recognized by the International Olympic Committee in May 1934, despite never competing. Although this committee represented Jews, Christians and Muslims living in Mandatory Palestine, its rules stated that they "represent[ed] the Jewish National Home."

According to Nabil Mabrouk, president of the Palestinian Track and Field Federation, the Palestine Olympic Committee was first founded in 1969. The Palestine Olympic Committee was accepted into the Olympic Council of Asia as a provisional member in 1986. The decision was protested by Israel, who was refused membership to the same committee in 1982. The decision allowed for the Palestine Olympic Committee to participate in the Asian Games. Yasser Arafat, the leader of the Palestine Liberation Organization, was also the head of the Palestine Olympic Committee in these early days.

The Palestinian Authority was first represented at the International Olympic Games at the 1996 Summer Olympics, by Majed Abu Maraheel, a runner who finished last in his 10,000 meter heat.

Akram Zaher, the manager of international relations for the Palestine Olympic Committee, also served as a board member and the Environment & Sports Committee chairman of the West Asian Games Federation. He was killed in a bomb explosion in a Palestinian refugee camp in Lebanon on March 24, 2009.

Samar Araj Mousa is a member of the Palestine Olympic Committee and also serves as the Athletics Director at Bethlehem University, the manager of the Palestinian Women's National Soccer Team, and the general secretary of the Palestinian Tennis Association.

Jibril Rajoub served as president, and now serves as chairman, of the Palestine Olympic Committee. He also served as president of the Palestine Football Association before being elected to the Fatah Central Committee in August 2009. Rajoub had also served as a security official under Yasser Arafat, and spent time in Israeli prison for attacking Israeli military vehicles. In a letter to the IOC on July 27, 2012, Rajoub praised their decision to not honor the 11 murdered Israeli athletes in the Munich massacre at the 1972 Olympic Games. In November 2015, Rajoub named a table tennis tournament in honor of Muhannad Halabi, who had stabbed and killed two Israeli civilians in Jerusalem a month prior. A poster advertising the tournament featured two images of Halabi; in large letters a poster for the tournament showed to photos of Halabi, and stated: "patronage of the leader Jibril Rajoub, head of the Palestine Olympic Committee." He also attended a boxing match named in honor of Ali Hassan Salameh, a planner of Black September, which killed 11 Israeli Olympians during the 1972 Summer Olympics in Munich. In September 2018, the Fédération Internationale de Football Association (FIFA) banned Jibril for 12 months and fined him 20,000 Swiss francs ($20,600) for inciting hatred and violence. In July 2019, his appeal on the ban was dismissed by the International Court of Arbitration for Sport.

In January 2024, the Israeli military bombed and destroyed the committee's office in Gaza.

== See also ==
- Palestine at the Olympics
- Palestinian Paralympic Committee
