= Morocco at the Arab Games =

- IOC code: MAR
- NOC: Moroccan National Olympic Committee
- Medals Ranked 4th: Gold 290 Silver 273 Bronze 300 Total 863

Arab Games appearances (overview)
- 1957; 1961; 1965; 1976; 1985; 1992; 1997; 1999; 2004; 2007; 2011; 2023; 2027

Morocco has competed since 1957 at the Arab Games making 12 Appearances in all Games Editions and Hosted two cities in a span of 24 years. Its athletes have won a total of 863 medals.

== Medal tables ==
=== Medals by Arab Games ===
Host nation

Below the table representing all Moroccan medals around the games. Till now, Morocco has won 863 medals of whom 290 are gold medals as well Morocco ranked Fourth in all time Games medal table just after Tunisia.

| Games | Athletes | Gold | Silver | Bronze | Total | Rank | Notes |
| (Egypt) 1953 Alexandria | Part of France | | | | | | |
| (Lebanon) 1957 Beirut | 0 | 9 | 10 | 6 | 25 | 4 | details |
| (Morocco) 1961 Casablanca | 0 | 23 | 20 | 30 | 73 | 2 | details |
| (Egypt) 1965 Cairo | 0 | 9 | 2 | 2 | 13 | 3 | details |
| (Syria) 1976 Damascus | 0 | 29 | 19 | 11 | 59 | 2 | details |
| (Morocco) 1985 Rabat | 0 | 57 | 28 | 32 | 117 | 1 | details |
| (Syria) 1992 Damascus | 0 | 15 | 7 | 6 | 28 | 4 | details |
| (Lebanon) 1997 Beirut | 0 | 18 | 15 | 16 | 49 | 4 | details |
| (Jordan) 1999 Amman | 0 | 30 | 42 | 41 | 113 | 5 | details |
| (Algeria) 2004 Algiers | 0 | 21 | 38 | 41 | 100 | 5 | details |
| (Egypt) 2007 Cairo | 230 | 21 | 32 | 36 | 89 | 2 | details |
| (Qatar) 2011 Doha | 253 | 37 | 22 | 54 | 113 | 3 | details |
| 2023 Algeria (5 cities) | 93 | 21 | 38 | 25 | 84 | 3 | details |
| Total | | 290 | 273 | 300 | 863 | 4 | – |

Sources :

== Medals by sport ==
Update to 2011 Pan Arab Games

| Sport | Gold | Silver | Bronze | Total |
|---|---|---|---|---|
| Athletics | 0 | 0 | 0 | 0 |
| Badminton | 0 | 0 | 0 | 0 |
| Basketball | 0 | 0 | 0 | 0 |
| Boxing | 0 | 0 | 0 | 0 |
| Cycling | 0 | 0 | 0 | 0 |
| Fencing | 0 | 0 | 0 | 0 |
| Football | 0 | 0 | 0 | 0 |
| Gymnastics | 0 | 0 | 0 | 0 |
| Handball | 0 | 0 | 0 | 0 |
| Judo | 0 | 0 | 0 | 0 |
| Karate | 0 | 0 | 0 | 0 |
| Sailing | 0 | 0 | 0 | 0 |
| Swimming | 0 | 0 | 0 | 0 |
| Taekwondo | 0 | 0 | 0 | 0 |
| Tennis | 0 | 0 | 0 | 0 |
| Volleyball | 0 | 0 | 0 | 0 |
| Weightlifting | 0 | 0 | 0 | 0 |
| Wrestling | 0 | 0 | 0 | 0 |
| Totals (18 entries) | 0 | 0 | 0 | 0 |

Source :

== See also ==
- Morocco at the Olympics
- Morocco at the African Games
- Morocco at the Mediterranean Games
- Morocco at the Paralympics
- Sports in Morocco
