= Algeria at the Arab Games =

- IOC code: ALG
- NOC: Algerian Olympic Committee
- Medals Ranked 2nd: Gold 360 Silver 381 Bronze 393 Total 1,134

Arab Games appearances (overview)
- 1965; 1976; 1985; 1992; 1997; 1999; 2004; 2007; 2011; 2023; 2027

Algeria has participated in the Arab Games since the fifth edition, held in Cairo, Egypt, in 1965. Over the years, Algeria has established itself as one of the most successful nations in the history of the Games, winning a total of 1,134 medals, including 360 gold, 381 silver, and 393 bronze medals.

Algeria has finished in first place twice throughout the competition's history, in the 2004 Arab Games and the 2023 Arab Games, making it the country's best overall ranking in the Games. Algeria has also consistently ranked among the leading Arab sporting nations in the overall medal standings.

== Medal tables ==
=== Medals by Arab Games ===
Host nation

Below is a table representing all Algerian medals around the games. Till now, Algeria has won 1134 medals and 360 gold medals.

Games	Gold	Silver	Bronze	Total	Rank	Notes
(Egypt) 1953 Alexandria	Part of France					
(Lebanon) 1957 Beirut	Part of France					
(Morocco) 1961 Casablanca	Part of France					
(Egypt) 1965 Cairo	0	3	2	5	8	details
(Syria) 1976 Damascus	Did not participate					
(Morocco) 1985 Rabat	15	40	42	97	4	details
(Syria) 1992 Damascus	27	21	24	72	3	details
(Lebanon) 1997 Beirut	43	46	43	132	2	details
(Jordan) 1999 Amman	33	32	31	96	4	details
(Algeria) 2004 Algiers	91	89	87	267	1	details
(Egypt) 2007 Cairo	30	43	51	124	3	details
(Qatar) 2011 Doha	16	31	41	88	5	details
2023 Algeria (5 cities)	105	76	72	253	1	details
Total	360	381	393	1134	2	–

=== Medals by sport ===
2011 and 2023 only

Sport	Gold	Silver	Bronze	Total
Swimming	24	23	20	67
Athletics	17	11	16	44
Judo	11	12	8	31
Wrestling	9	9	6	24
Boxing	9	6	10	25
Gymnastics	8	5	7	20
Boules	8	5	2	15
Karate	7	7	9	23
Cycling	7	3	5	15
Fencing	5	1	3	9
Weightlifting	3	9	3	15
Badminton	3	4	6	13
Sailing	2	4	7	13
Chess	2	3	3	8
Table tennis	2	1	4	7
Volleyball	1	2	1	4
Basketball 3x3	1	1	0	2
Shooting	1	1	0	2
Handball	1	0	1	2
Taekwondo	0	0	2	2
Totals (20 entries)	121	107	113	341

== Athletes with most medals ==
Athletes who won 5 or more medals (2011–2023).

Athlete	Sport	Games	Gold medal	Silver medal	Bronze medal	Total
Jaouad Syoud	Swimming	2023	11	0	0	11
Amel Melih	Swimming	2011–2023	7	1	1	9
Nesrine Medjahed	Swimming	2023	4	1	3	8
Redouane Bouali	Swimming	2023	4	0	2	6
Fella Bennaceur	Swimming	2011	0	3	3	6
Fares Benzidoun	Swimming	2023	3	1	1	5
Youcef Reguigui	Cycling	2011–2023	2	1	2	5
Moncef Aymen Balamane	Swimming	2023	1	3	1	5
Nabil Kebbab	Swimming	2011	0	3	2	5

== Football tournaments ==
Arab Games record
Appearances: 1
Year	Round	Position	Pld	W	D	L	GF	GA
(Egypt) 1953	Part of France							
(Lebanon) 1957	Part of France							
(Morocco) 1961	Part of France							
(United Arab Republic) 1965	Did not enter							
(Syria) 1976	Did not enter							
(Morocco) 1985	Bronze ^{1}	3rd	5	2	0	3	4	5
(Syria) 1992	Did not enter							
(Lebanon) 1997	Did not enter							
(Jordan) 1999	Withdrew							
(Algeria) 2004	No tournament							
(Egypt) 2007	Did not enter							
(Qatar) 2011	Did not enter							
(Algeria) 2023	Fourth place	4th	5	2	2	1	7	5
(Saudi Arabia) 2027	To be determined							
Total	Bronze Medal	2/12	10	4	2	4	11	10

- 1. Algeria participated with the B team.
- Prior to the 2023 campaign, the Football at the Arab Games was open to full senior national teams.

== See also ==
- Algeria at the Olympics
- Algeria at the Paralympics
- Algeria at the Mediterranean Games
- Algeria at the African Games
- Algeria at the Islamic Solidarity Games
- Sports in Algeria
