= Tunisia at the Arab Games =

- IOC code: TUN
- NOC: Tunisian Olympic Committee
- Medals Ranked 3rd: Gold 298 Silver 271 Bronze 342 Total 911

Arab Games appearances (overview)
- 1953; 1957; 1961; 1965; 1976; 1985–2023; 2027

Tunisia has participated in the Arab Games since the second edition of the tournament, which was held in Beirut, Lebanon, during the 1957 Arab Games. Over the years, Tunisia established itself as one of the most successful and competitive nations in the history of the Games, winning a total of 911 medals, including 298 gold, 271 silver, and 342 bronze medals. These achievements place the country third in the all-time Arab Games medal table.

Tunisia has finished in second place on six occasions throughout the competition’s history and has consistently ranked among the leading Arab sporting nations. Beginning with the ninth edition of the Games in Amman during the 1999 Arab Games, and continuing through the most recent edition held in Algeria at the 2023 Arab Games, Tunisia maintained a strong presence among the top three nations in the overall medal standings.

== Medal tables ==
=== Medals by Arab Games ===
Host nation

Below the table representing all Tunisian medals around the games. Till now, Tunisia has won 911 medals throughout the history of the Games.

Games	Athletes	Gold	Silver	Bronze	Total	Rank	Notes
(Egypt) 1953 Alexandria	Part of France						
(Lebanon) 1957 Beirut	0	20	8	17	45	2	details
(Morocco) 1961 Casablanca	Did not participate						
(Egypt) 1965 Cairo	Did not participate						
(Syria) 1976 Damascus	Did not participate						
(Morocco) 1985 Rabat	0	41	25	25	91	2	details
(Syria) 1992 Damascus	0	3	22	26	51	8	details
(Lebanon) 1997 Beirut	0	9	12	26	47	7	details
(Jordan) 1999 Amman	0	39	40	62	141	2	details
(Algeria) 2004 Algiers	0	46	39	47	132	3	details
(Egypt) 2007 Cairo	329	63	33	49	145	2	details
(Qatar) 2011 Doha	218	54	45	39	138	2	details
2023 Algeria (5 cities)	195	23	47	51	121	2	details
Total		298	271	342	911	3	–

Sources :

== Medals by sport ==
Update to 2011 Pan Arab Games

Sport	Gold	Silver	Bronze	Total
Athletics	0	0	0	0
Badminton	0	0	0	0
Basketball	0	0	0	0
Boxing	0	0	0	0
Cycling	0	0	0	0
Fencing	0	0	0	0
Football	0	0	0	0
Gymnastics	0	0	0	0
Handball	0	0	0	0
Judo	0	0	0	0
Karate	0	0	0	0
Sailing	0	0	0	0
Swimming	0	0	0	0
Taekwondo	0	0	0	0
Tennis	0	0	0	0
Volleyball	0	0	0	0
Weightlifting	0	0	0	0
Wrestling	0	0	0	0
Totals (18 entries)	0	0	0	0

== See also ==
- Tunisia at the Olympics
- Tunisia at the African Games
- Tunisia at the Mediterranean Games
- Tunisia at the Paralympics
- Sports in Tunisia
