= United Arab Emirates at the Arab Games =

- IOC code: UAE
- NOC: UAENOC
- Medals Ranked 14th: Gold 34 Silver 41 Bronze 65 Total 140

Arab Games appearances (overview)
- 1976; 1985; 1992; 1997; 1999; 2004; 2007; 2011; 2023; 2027

the United Arab Emirates has taken part in the Arab Games since the fifth Edition held in 1976 in Damascus, Syria. By 2023, data from the Union of Arab National Olympic Committees shows that Emirati competitors have secured 140 medals in total — including 34 gold, 41 silver, and 65 bronze. Overall, United Arab Emirates holds the top 14th position in the medal table as off the last Arab Games held in Algeria. The best finish was a 9th-place result, achieved at the ninth edition 1999 Arab Games held in Amman, Jordan.

== Medal tables ==
=== Medals by Arab Games ===
Host nation

Below is a table representing all Emirati medals around the games. Till now, United Arab Emirates has won 140 medals around the games history.

| Games | Gold | Silver | Bronze | Total | Rank | Notes | RF |
| (Egypt) 1953 Alexandria | Did not participate | | | | | | |
| (Lebanon) 1957 Beirut | Did not participate | | | | | | |
| (Morocco) 1961 Casablanca | Did not participate | | | | | | |
| (Egypt) 1965 Cairo | Did not participate | | | | | | |
| (Syria) 1976 Damascus | 0 | 0 | 0 | 0 | – | details | |
| (Morocco) 1985 Rabat | 0 | 0 | 0 | 0 | – | details | |
| (Syria) 1992 Damascus | 1 | 3 | 1 | 5 | 10th | details | |
| (Lebanon) 1997 Beirut | 0 | 1 | 1 | 2 | 14th | details | |
| (Jordan) 1999 Amman | 8 | 9 | 17 | 34 | 9th | details | |
| (Algeria) 2004 Algiers | 4 | 5 | 10 | 19 | 10th | details | |
| (Egypt) 2007 Cairo | 6 | 9 | 8 | 23 | 12th | details | |
| (Qatar) 2011 Doha | 10 | 9 | 16 | 35 | 11th | details | |
| (Algeria) 2023 Algiers (5 cities) | 5 | 5 | 12 | 22 | 11th | details | |
| Total | 34 | 41 | 65 | 140 | 14th | – | |

== See also ==
- United Arab Emirates at the Olympics
- United Arab Emirates at the Paralympics
- United Arab Emirates at the Asian Games
- United Arab Emirates at the Islamic Solidarity Games
- Sports in the United Arab Emirates
