= Saudi Arabia at the Arab Games =

- IOC code: KSA
- NOC: Saudi Olympic Committee
- Medals Ranked 11th: Gold 76 Silver 106 Bronze 154 Total 336

Arab Games appearances (overview)
- 1976; 1985; 1992; 1997; 1999; 2004; 2007; 2011; 2023; 2027

Saudi Arabia has taken part in the Arab Games since the second Edition held in 1957 in Beirut, Lebanon. By 2023, data from the Union of Arab National Olympic Committees shows that Saudi Arabian competitors have secured 336 medals in total — including 76 gold, 106 silver, and 154 bronze. Overall, Saudi Arabia holds the top 11th position in the medal table as off the last Arab Games held in Algeria. The best finish was a fifth-place result, achieved at the fifth edition 1976 Arab Games held in Damascus. The 2027 Arab Games will be held in Riyadh, Saudi Arabia for the first time.

== Medal tables ==
=== Medals by Arab Games ===
Host nation

Below is a table representing all Saudis medals around the games. Till now, Saudi Arabia has won 336 medals around the games history.

Games	Gold	Silver	Bronze	Total	Rank	Notes	RF
(Egypt) 1953 Alexandria	Did not participate						
(Lebanon) 1957 Beirut	0	0	0	0	—	details	
(Morocco) 1961 Casablanca	0	0	0	0	—	details	
(Egypt) 1965 Cairo	Did not participate						
(Syria) 1976 Damascus	3	6	19	28	5th	details	
(Morocco) 1985 Rabat	1	0	8	9	11th	details	
(Syria) 1992 Damascus	5	12	5	22	7th	details	
(Lebanon) 1997 Beirut	6	12	21	39	9th	details	
(Jordan) 1999 Amman	15	16	18	49	7th	details	
(Algeria) 2004 Algiers	16	20	18	54	6th	details	
(Egypt) 2007 Cairo	8	19	18	45	7th	details	
(Qatar) 2011 Doha	15	12	19	46	6th	details	
(Algeria) 2023 Algiers (5 cities)	7	9	28	44	10th	details	
Total	76	106	154	336	11th	—	

== See also ==
- Saudi Arabia at the Olympics
- Saudi Arabia at the Paralympics
- Saudi Arabia at the Asian Games
- Saudi Arabia at the Islamic Solidarity Games
- Sports in Saudi Arabia
