= Palestine at the Arab Games =

- IOC code: PLE
- NOC: Palestine Olympic Committee
- Medals Ranked 18th: Gold 9 Silver 23 Bronze 70 Total 102

Arab Games appearances (overview)
- 1953; 1957; 1961; 1965; 1976; 1985; 1992; 1997; 1999; 2004; 2007; 2011; 2023; 2027

Palestine has taken part in the Arab Games since the first Edition held in 1953 in Alexandria, Egypt. By 2023, data from the Union of Arab National Olympic Committees shows that Palestinian competitors have secured 102 medals in total — including 9 gold, 23 silver, and 70 bronze. Overall, Palestine holds the top 18th position in the medal table as off the last Arab Games held in Algeria. The best finish was a third-place result, achieved at the first edition 1953 Arab Games held in Alexandria.

== Medal tables ==
=== Medals by Arab Games ===
Host nation

Below is a table representing all Palestinian medals around the games. Till now, Palestine has won 101 medals around the games history.

Games	Gold	Silver	Bronze	Total	Rank	Notes	RF
(Egypt) 1953 Alexandria	1	5	6	12	3rd	details	
(Lebanon) 1957 Beirut	Did not participate						
(Morocco) 1961 Casablanca	1	0	7	8	5th	details	
(Egypt) 1965 Cairo	0	1	2	3	9th	details	
(Syria) 1976 Damascus	1	6	14	21	7th	details	
(Morocco) 1985 Rabat	0	1	3	4	16th	details	
(Syria) 1992 Damascus	1	2	6	9	11th	details	
(Lebanon) 1997 Beirut	0	0	5	5	16th	details	
(Jordan) 1999 Amman	0	1	10	11	17th	details	
(Algeria) 2004 Algiers	0	1	1	2	18th	details	
(Egypt) 2007 Cairo	0	0	3	3	18th	details	
(Qatar) 2011 Doha	1	2	5	8	15th	details	
(Algeria) 2023 Algiers (5 cities)	4	4	8	16	13th	details	
Total	9	23	70	102	18th	–	

== See also ==
- Palestine at the Olympics
- Palestine at the Paralympics
- Palestine at the Asian Games
- Palestine at the Islamic Solidarity Games
- Sports in Palestine
