= Lebanon at the Arab Games =

- IOC code: LBN
- NOC: Lebanese Olympic Committee
- Medals Ranked 10th: Gold 77 Silver 120 Bronze 186 Total 383

Arab Games appearances (overview)
- 1976; 1985–2023; 2027

Lebanon has taken part in the Arab Games since the first Edition held in 1953 in Alexandria, Egypt. By 2023, data from the Union of Arab National Olympic Committees shows that Lebanese competitors have secured 383 medals in total — including 77 gold, 120 silver, and 186 bronze. Overall, Lebanon holds the top 10th position in the medal table as off the last Arab Games held in Algeria. The best finish was a first-place result, achieved at the 1957 Arab Games held in Beirut, where the team competed as the host nation.

== Medal tables ==
=== Medals by Arab Games ===
Host nation

Below is a table representing all Lebanese medals around the games. Till now, Lebanon has won 383 medals around the games history.

Games	Gold	Silver	Bronze	Total	Rank	Notes	RF
(Egypt) 1953 Alexandria	3	15	16	34	2nd	details	
(Lebanon) 1957 Beirut	29	38	19	86	1st	details	
(Morocco) 1961 Casablanca	7	19	17	43	3rd	details	
(Egypt) 1965 Cairo	2	10	16	28	4th	details	
(Syria) 1976 Damascus	Did not participate						
(Morocco) 1985 Rabat	2	2	3	7	8th	details	
(Syria) 1992 Damascus	1	1	10	12	12th	details	
(Lebanon) 1997 Beirut	9	15	52	76	6th	details	
(Jordan) 1999 Amman	7	9	25	41	11th	details	
(Algeria) 2004 Algiers	3	3	5	11	13th	details	
(Egypt) 2007 Cairo	6	5	9	20	14th	details	
(Qatar) 2011 Doha	8	5	16	29	12th	details	
(Algeria) 2023 Algiers (5 cities)	0	0	0	0	—	details	
Total	77	120	186	383	10th	–	

== See also ==
- Lebanon at the Olympics
- Lebanon at the Paralympics
- Lebanon at the Asian Games
- Lebanon at the Mediterranean Games
- Lebanon at the Islamic Solidarity Games
- Sports in Lebanon
