= Libya at the Arab Games =

- IOC code: LBA
- NOC: Libyan Olympic Committee
- Medals Ranked 16th: Gold 23 Silver 42 Bronze 61 Total 126

Arab Games appearances (overview)
- 1976; 1985; 1992; 1997–2023; 2027

Libya has competed in the Arab Games since the inaugural edition in Alexandria during the 1953 Arab Games.

Over the course of its participation, Libyan athletes have won a total of 126 medals — including 23 gold, 42 silver, and 61 bronze — placing Libya 16th in the all-time Arab Games medal table.

Libya achieved its highest medal haul at the 2007 Arab Games in Cairo, where the delegation collected 30 medals in total. The country's best overall finish came at the 1961 Arab Games in Casablanca, where Libya placed fourth in the final standings.

== Medal tables ==
=== Medals by Arab Games ===
Host nation

Below is a table representing all Libyan medals around the games. Till now, Libya has won 126 medals around the games history.

Games	Gold	Silver	Bronze	Total	Rank	Notes	RF
(Egypt) 1953 Alexandria	0	0	1	1	7th	details	
(Lebanon) 1957 Beirut	0	0	0	0	—	details	
(Morocco) 1961 Casablanca	2	4	6	12	4th	details	
(Egypt) 1965 Cairo	0	5	8	13	7th	details	
(Syria) 1976 Damascus	Did not participate						
(Morocco) 1985 Rabat	6	15	1	22	6th	details	
(Syria) 1992 Damascus	Did not participate						
(Lebanon) 1997 Beirut	0	1	2	3	13th	details	
(Jordan) 1999 Amman	0	1	13	14	16th	details	
(Algeria) 2004 Algiers	5	2	3	10	9th	details	
(Egypt) 2007 Cairo	6	10	14	30	11th	details	
(Qatar) 2011 Doha	1	1	7	9	16th	details	
(Algeria) 2023 Algiers (5 cities)	3	3	6	12	14th	details	
Total	23	42	61	126	16th	–	

== See also ==
- Libya at the Olympics
- Libya at the Paralympics
- Libya at the African Games
- Libya at the Islamic Solidarity Games
- Sports in Libya
