= Oman at the Arab Games =

- IOC code: OMN
- NOC: Oman Olympic Committee
- Medals Ranked 17th: Gold 19 Silver 18 Bronze 27 Total 64

Arab Games appearances (overview)
- 1953; 1957; 1961; 1965; 1976; 1985–2023; 2027

Oman has participated in the Arab Games since making its debut at the fourth edition of the Games, held in Cairo during the 1965 Arab Games.

Since its first appearance, Oman has accumulated a total of 64 medals across all editions of the Games, comprising 19 gold, 18 silver, and 27 bronze medals. This places the nation 17th in the all-time Arab Games medal table.

Oman achieved its highest medal haul at a single edition during the 12th 2011 Arab Games in Doha, where the delegation won 21 medals. However, the country’s strongest overall performance came at the 1997 Arab Games in Beirut, where Oman finished 11th in the final medal standings.

== Medal tables ==
=== Medals by Arab Games ===
Host nation

Below is a table representing all Omani medals around the games. Till now, Oman has won 64 medals around the games history.

| Games | Gold | Silver | Bronze | Total | Rank | Notes | RF |
| (Egypt) 1953 Alexandria | Did not participate | | | | | | |
| (Lebanon) 1957 Beirut | Did not participate | | | | | | |
| (Morocco) 1961 Casablanca | Did not participate | | | | | | |
| (Egypt) 1965 Cairo | 0 | 0 | 0 | 0 | — | details | |
| (Syria) 1976 Damascus | Did not participate | | | | | | |
| (Morocco) 1985 Rabat | 0 | 0 | 0 | 0 | — | details | |
| (Syria) 1992 Damascus | 0 | 0 | 2 | 2 | 15th | details | |
| (Lebanon) 1997 Beirut | 1 | 1 | 1 | 3 | 11th | details | |
| (Jordan) 1999 Amman | 4 | 5 | 7 | 16 | 12th | details | |
| (Algeria) 2004 Algiers | 0 | 1 | 0 | 1 | 19th | details | |
| (Egypt) 2007 Cairo | 5 | 1 | 2 | 8 | 15th | details | |
| (Qatar) 2011 Doha | 4 | 7 | 10 | 21 | 13th | details | |
| (Algeria) 2023 Algiers (5 cities) | 5 | 3 | 5 | 13 | 12th | details | |
| Total | 19 | 18 | 27 | 64 | 17th | – | |

== See also ==
- Oman at the Olympics
- Oman at the Paralympics
- Oman at the Asian Games
- Oman at the Islamic Solidarity Games
- Sports in Oman
