= Iraq at the Arab Games =

- IOC code: IRQ
- NOC: National Olympic Committee of Iraq
- Medals Ranked 7th: Gold 88 Silver 144 Bronze 194 Total 426

Arab Games appearances (overview)
- 1961; 1965; 1976; 1985; 1992; 1997; 1999–2023; 2027

Iraq has taken part in the Arab Games since the first Edition held in 1953 in Alexandria, Egypt. By 2023, data from the Union of Arab National Olympic Committees shows that Iraqi competitors have secured 426 medals in total—including 88 gold, 144 silver, and 194 bronze. Overall, Iraq holds the top 7th position in the medal table as off the last Arab Games held in Algeria. The best finish was a second-place result, achieved at the 1965 Arab Games held in Cairo. This performance stands as the team's highest ranking in the competition.

== Medal tables ==
=== Medals by Arab Games ===
Host nation

Below is the table representing all Iraqi medals in the games. Until now, Iraq has won 426 medals (88 gold, 144 silver, and 194 bronze).

Games	Gold	Silver	Bronze	Total	Rank	Notes	RF
(Egypt) 1953 Alexandria	0	5	6	11	5th	details	
(Lebanon) 1957 Beirut	15	13	7	35	3rd	details	
(Morocco) 1961 Casablanca	Did not participate						
(Egypt) 1965 Cairo	10	21	11	42	2nd	details	
(Syria) 1976 Damascus	Did not participate						
(Morocco) 1985 Rabat	20	20	16	56	3rd	details	
(Syria) 1992 Damascus	Did not participate						
(Lebanon) 1997 Beirut	Did not participate						
(Jordan) 1999 Amman	8	7	32	47	10th	details	
(Algeria) 2004 Algiers	13	24	34	71	7th	details	
(Egypt) 2007 Cairo	4	23	33	60	16th	details	
(Qatar) 2011 Doha	11	13	34	58	10th	details	
(Algeria) 2023 Algiers (5 cities)	7	18	21	46	9th	details	
Total	88	144	194	426	7th	–	

== See also ==
- Iraq at the Olympics
- Iraq at the Paralympics
- Iraq at the Asian Games
- Iraq at the Islamic Solidarity Games
- Sports in Iraq
