= Jordan at the Arab Games =

- IOC code: JOR
- NOC: Jordan Olympic Committee
- Medals Ranked 8th: Gold 88 Silver 140 Bronze 228 Total 456

Arab Games appearances (overview)
- 1953; 1957; 1961; 1965; 1976; 1985; 1992; 1997; 1999; 2004; 2007; 2011; 2023; 2027

Jordan has taken part in every edition of the Arab Games since the inaugural tournament held in Alexandria during the 1953 Games. Throughout its long history in the competition, Jordan has established itself as one of the Arab world’s consistent sporting nations, collecting a total of 456 medals, including 88 gold, 140 silver, and 228 bronze medals. This achievement places the kingdom 8th overall in the all-time Arab Games medal table. Jordan has hosted the Games on one occasion, when the capital city of Amman staged the 9th edition of the competition during the 1999 Arab Games.

== Medal tables ==
=== Medals by Arab Games ===
Host nation

Below is a table representing all Jordanian medals around the games. Till now, Jordan has won 456 medals around the games history.

Games	Gold	Silver	Bronze	Total	Rank	Notes	RF
(Egypt) 1953 Alexandria	0	0	2	2	6th	details	
(Lebanon) 1957 Beirut	3	4	3	10	6th	details	
(Morocco) 1961 Casablanca	0	1	3	4	6th	details	
(Egypt) 1965 Cairo	0	0	2	2	10th	details	
(Syria) 1976 Damascus	2	25	7	34	6th	details	
(Morocco) 1985 Rabat	1	0	0	1	13th	details	
(Syria) 1992 Damascus	1	6	6	13	9th	details	
(Lebanon) 1997 Beirut	10	8	23	41	5th	details	
(Jordan) 1999 Amman	26	33	70	129	6th	details	
(Algeria) 2004 Algiers	11	19	31	61	8th	details	
(Egypt) 2007 Cairo	6	14	29	49	10th	details	
(Qatar) 2011 Doha	11	14	23	48	9th	details	
(Algeria) 2023 Algiers (5 cities)	17	16	29	62	5th	details	
Total	88	140	228	456	8th	–	

== See also ==
- Jordan at the Olympics
- Jordan at the Paralympics
- Jordan at the Asian Games
- Jordan at the Islamic Solidarity Games
- Sports in Jordan
