= Syria at the Arab Games =

- IOC code: SYR
- NOC: Syrian Olympic Committee
- Medals Ranked 5th: Gold 242 Silver 250 Bronze 338 Total 830

Arab Games appearances (overview)
- 1961; 1965; 1976–2007; 2011; 2023; 2027

Syria has participated in the Arab Games since the inaugural edition held in Alexandria during the 1953 Games. Over the course of its history in the competition, Syria has emerged as one of the most successful Arab nations at the Games, winning a total of 830 medals, including 242 gold, 250 silver, and 338 bronze medals. These accomplishments place Syria 5th overall in the all-time Arab Games medal table. Syria has hosted the Arab Games on two occasions, first during the 5th edition of the tournament at the 1976 Arab Games in Damascus. The capital later welcomed the event again when it staged the 7th edition during the 1992 Arab Games.

== Medal tables ==
=== Medals by Arab Games ===
Host nation

Below is a table representing all Syrian medals around the games. Till now, Syria has won 830 medals around the games history.

Games	Gold	Silver	Bronze	Total	Rank	Notes	RF
(Egypt) 1953 Alexandria	0	15	16	31	3rd	details	
(Lebanon) 1957 Beirut	7	9	10	26	5th	details	
(Morocco) 1961 Casablanca	See United Arab Republic						
(Egypt) 1965 Cairo	1	7	19	27	5th	details	
(Syria) 1976 Damascus	72	40	23	135	1st	details	
(Morocco) 1985 Rabat	9	14	31	54	5th	details	
(Syria) 1992 Damascus	48	30	36	114	1st	details	
(Lebanon) 1997 Beirut	18	29	34	81	3rd	details	
(Jordan) 1999 Amman	34	38	64	136	3rd	details	
(Algeria) 2004 Algiers	24	30	36	90	4th	details	
(Egypt) 2007 Cairo	15	23	45	83	5th	details	
(Qatar) 2011 Doha	Did not participate						
(Algeria) 2023 Algiers (5 cities)	14	15	24	53	6th	details	
Total	242	250	338	830	5th	–	

== See also ==
- Syria at the Olympics
- Syria at the Paralympics
- Syria at the Asian Games
- Syria at the Mediterranean Games
- Syria at the Islamic Solidarity Games
- Sports in Syria
