= Egypt at the Arab Games =

- IOC code: EGY
- NOC: Egyptian Olympic Committee
- Medals Ranked 1st: Gold 641 Silver 431 Bronze 379 Total 1,451

Arab Games appearances (overview)
- 1957; 1961–1965; 1976; 1985; 1992–2023; 2027

Egypt has participated in the Arab Games nine times, with great success. Egypt did not participate in the 2nd, 5th & 6th editions of The Pan Arab Games in Beirut 1957, Damascus 1976 & Rabat 1985.

== Overview ==
=== Medals by Arab Games ===
Host nation

Below is a table representing all Egyptian medals around the games. Till now, Egypt has won a total of 1,451 medals.

Year	Host City	Rank	Participating Nations	Gold	Silver	Bronze	Total
1953	Alexandria	1st place	8	75	36	25	136
1957	Beirut	Did not participate					
1961	Casablanca	See United Arab Republic					
1965	Cairo	See United Arab Republic					
1976	Damascus	Did not participate					
1985	Rabat	Did not participate					
1992	Damascus	2nd place	17	36	30	30	96
1997	Beirut	1st place	17	93	56	38	187
1999	Amman	1st place	22	106	80	81	267
2004	Algiers	2nd place	22	81	52	49	182
2007	Cairo	1st place	22	148	100	89	337
2011	Doha	1st place	21	90	76	67	233
2023	Algiers	7th place	22	12	1	0	13
Total				641	431	379	1,451
