= Boxing at the Arab Games =

Boxing competitions

Boxing is one of the sports at the quadrennial Arab Games competition. It has been one of the sports competed at the event since the inaugural edition in 1951.

== Editions ==
Games	Year	Host city
I	1953	(Egypt) Alexandria
II	1957	(Lebanon) Beirut
III	1961	(Morocco) Casablanca
IV	1965	(United Arab Republic) Cairo
V	1976	(Syria) Damascus
VI	1985	(Morocco) Rabat
VII	1992	(Syria) Damascus
VIII	1997	(Lebanon) Beirut
IX	1999	(Jordan) Amman
X	2004	(Algeria) Algiers
XI	2007	(Egypt) Cairo
XII	2011	(Qatar) Doha
XIII	2023	Algeria (5 cities)^{a}

^a Arab Games helds in 5 cities (Algiers, Oran, Constantine, Annaba and Tipaza). Boxing tournament helds in Algiers.

== See also ==
- Boxing at the All-Africa Games
- Boxing at the Asian Games
