= Athletics at the Arab Games =

Athletics is one of the sports at the quadrennial Arab Games competition. Athletics competitions have been held at every one of the eleven editions of the Pan Arab Games, which was inaugurated in 1953. Many of the region's top athletes have competed in the athletics at the Pan Arab Games, such as Saïd Aouita, Hassiba Boulmerka and Ghada Shouaa. Women's events were added to the programme at the 1985 Pan Arab Games and the 1984 Olympic champion Nawal El Moutawakel went on to win gold medals in four separate events.

== Editions ==
Games	Year	Host city	Host country	Events
I	1953	Alexandria	Egypt	21
II	1957	Beirut	Lebanon	21
III	1961	Casablanca	Morocco	24
IV	1965	Cairo	UAR	24
V	1976	Damascus	Syria	22
VI	1985	Rabat	Morocco	39
VII	1992	Damascus	Syria	41
VIII	1997	Beirut	Lebanon	41
IX	1999	Amman	Jordan	45
X	2004	Algiers	Algeria	45
XI	2007	Cairo	Egypt	46
XII	2011	Doha	Qatar	45 (+30 disability)
XIII	2023	Oran^{a}	Algeria	43

^a Arab Games helds in 5 cities (Algiers, Oran, Constantine, Annaba and Tipaza). Athletics tournament helds in Oran.

== See also ==
- International Athletics Championships and Games
- Arab Athletics Championships
