= Chess at the 2007 Arab Games =

Chess at the 2007 Pan Arab Games
- Venue: Olympic Centre
- Location: Maadi, Egypt
- Start date: 13 November 2007
- End date: 21 November 2007

The chess events at the 2007 Pan Arab Games were held from 13 to 21 November at the Olympic Centre in Maadi, a suburb of Cairo, Egypt. Twelve men's teams and nine women's teams competed separately in tournaments conducted at classical time controls (all moves in 90 minutes, plus 30 seconds increment per move). Medals were awarded to the teams scoring the highest number of board points, as well as to individual players with the best performances by percentage score on each board with at least five games played. Medals were also awarded to the best overall performances on any board by percentage score. Bronze medals were awarded for both third and fourth-place individual performances.

The men's teams played a nine-round Swiss-system tournament. Each men's team consisted of six players and matches were contested over four boards. Egypt was the only team to finish the tournament undefeated, conceding only one draw to Algeria and winning the gold medal for the second time in a row with 26 board points. Syria scored 23½ board points to win the silver medal, while Algeria finished with 20½ board points and took bronze.

The women's teams played a round robin. Each women's team consisted of four players and matches were contested over three boards. The Egyptian and Syrian teams tied for first with 17½ board points, but Egypt won the gold medal on superior match points (7½/8 vs. 6½/8 for Syria), having beaten Syria in their direct encounter. Iraq scored 13½ board points to win bronze, while defending gold medallists Algeria, which drew all three medal-winning teams in their direct encounters, scored 13 board points to finish fourth.

== Participating nations ==
- Algeria
- Egypt
- Iraq
- Jordan
- Lebanon
- Libya
- Morocco
- Qatar
- Sudan
- Syria (Pan Arab Games)
- Tunisia
- United Arab Emirates
- Yemen

Eight countries sent both men's and women's teams. Lebanon only competed in the women's tournament, while Jordan, Qatar, Sudan, and Tunisia only competed in the men's tournament.

== Medal summary ==
Event	Gold		Silver		Bronze	
Men's team – overall	Egypt (EGY); Essam El-Gindy; Bassem Amin; Ahmed Adly; Mohamed Ezat; Khaled Abdel Razik; Walaa Sarwat	26	Syria (SYR); Adel Omearat; Ahmad Hamad; Imad Hakki; Samir Mohamed; Hanni Beitar; Jwan Bakr	23½	Algeria (ALG); Aimen Rizouk; Adlane Arab; Saad Belouadah; Mohamed Haddouche; Mohamed Amine Ghafoul; Djamel Ferhi	20½
Men's team – Board 1	Aimen Rizouk; Algeria	85.7%	Slim Belkhodja; Tunisia	78.6%	Mohammed Al-Modiahki; Qatar	77.8%
Men's team – Board 1	Aimen Rizouk; Algeria	85.7%	Slim Belkhodja; Tunisia	78.6%	Essam El-Gindy; Egypt	68.8%
Men's team – Board 2	Mohammed Al-Sayed; Qatar	87.5%	Zendan Al-Zendani; Yemen	83.3%	Oussama Bouhaddoun; Morocco	78.6%
Men's team – Board 2	Mohammed Al-Sayed; Qatar	87.5%	Abobker Elarbi; Libya	83.3%	Oussama Bouhaddoun; Morocco	78.6%
Men's team – Board 3	Aziz Ahmad; Iraq	91.7%	–	–	Ahmed Adly; Egypt	81.3%
Men's team – Board 3	Imad Hakki; Syria	91.7%	–	–	Mokhlis El-Adnani; Morocco	50.0%
Men's team – Board 4	Othman Moussa; United Arab Emirates	83.3%	Mohamed Haddouche; Algeria	78.6%	Samir Mohamed; Syria	77.8%
Men's team – Board 4	Othman Moussa; United Arab Emirates	83.3%	Mohamed Haddouche; Algeria	78.6%	Ibrahim Chahrani; Libya	42.9%
Men's team – Board 5	Bashir Al-Qudaimi; Yemen	100%	–	–	Ahmad Samhouri; Jordan	68.8%
Men's team – Board 5	Mohamed Nawfal; Iraq	100%	–	–	Adel Mahmoud El-Kamel; Tunisia	58.3%
Men's team – Board 6	Khaled Ben Nasser; Libya	83.3%	Sami Khadar; Jordan	71.4%	Walaa Sarwat; Egypt	70.0%
Men's team – Board 6	Khaled Ben Nasser; Libya	83.3%	Sami Khadar; Jordan	71.4%	Ali Asim Obid; Sudan	66.7%
Men's team – Performance on any board	Bashir Al-Qudaimi; Yemen	100%	–	–	Aziz Ahmad; Iraq	91.7%
Men's team – Performance on any board	Mohamed Nawfal; Iraq	100%	–	–	Imad Hakki; Syria	91.7%
Women's team – overall	Egypt (EGY); Yosra Alaa El Din (Note: Dina Al-Naimi was listed as first board for the Egyptian women's team, but she did not play any games.); Mona Khaled; Faridah Basta Sohair	17½	Syria (SYR); Dhuha Farha; Sheryn Estif; Nibal Algildah; Afamia Mir Mahmoud	17½	Iraq (IRQ); Eman Hassane Al-Rufei; Delbak Ibrahim; Jannar Worya Mohammed; Dhuha Muhsin	13½
Women's team – Board 1	Eman Hassane Al-Rufei; Iraq	80.0%	–	–	Hayat Toubal; Algeria	62.5%
Women's team – Board 1	Laila El-Amri; Morocco	80.0%	–	–	Danielle Bedrossian Ghattas; Lebanon	50.0%
Women's team – Board 2	Amina Mezioud; Algeria	91.7%	Yosra Alaa El Din; Egypt	81.3%	Nora Mohamed Saleh; United Arab Emirates	80.0%
Women's team – Board 2	Amina Mezioud; Algeria	91.7%	Yosra Alaa El Din; Egypt	81.3%	Sheryn Estif; Syria	62.5%
Women's team – Board 3	Nibal Algildah; Syria	91.7%	Khalood El-Fouloud; Libya	64.3%	Mona Khaled; Egypt	62.5%
Women's team – Board 3	Nibal Algildah; Syria	91.7%	Khalood El-Fouloud; Libya	64.3%	Hind Bahji; Morocco	58.3%
Women's team – Board 4	Afamia Mir Mahmoud; Syria	100%	Faridah Basta Sohair; Egypt	75.0%	Dhuha Muhsin; Iraq	60.0%
Women's team – Board 4	Afamia Mir Mahmoud; Syria	100%	Faridah Basta Sohair; Egypt	75.0%	Nadhmia Abdulsalam; Yemen	58.3%
Women's team – Performance on any board	Afamia Mir Mahmoud; Syria	100%	Amina Mezioud; Algeria	91.7%	Yosra Alaa El Din; Egypt	81.3%
Women's team – Performance on any board	Afamia Mir Mahmoud; Syria	100%	Nibal Algildah; Syria	91.7%	Yosra Alaa El Din; Egypt	81.3%

== Medal table ==
* Host nation (Egypt)

Rank	Nation	Gold	Silver	Bronze	Total
1	Syria (SYR)	4	3	3	10
2	Iraq (IRQ)	4	0	3	7
3	Egypt (EGY)*	2	2	5	9
4	Algeria (ALG)	2	2	2	6
5	Yemen (YEM)	2	1	1	4
6	Libya (LBA)	1	2	1	4
7	Morocco (MAR)	1	0	3	4
8	Qatar (QAT)	1	0	1	2
8	United Arab Emirates (UAE)	1	0	1	2
10	Jordan (JOR)	0	1	1	2
10	Tunisia (TUN)	0	1	1	2
12	Lebanon (LIB)	0	0	1	1
12	Sudan (SUD)	0	0	1	1
Totals (13 entries)		18	12	24	54

== See also ==
- Chess at the Pan Arab Games
