= Badminton at the Arab Games =

Badminton has been part of the Arab Games since 1999 in Amman, Jordan. Syria tops the medal table, having won 15 gold medals, 3 silvers and 3 bronze medals. Algeria won four golds and two silvers while Egypt won a gold, three silvers and six bronzes. Sudan won its first medal in badminton at the 2007 Pan Arab Games.

At the 2011 Arab Games in Qatar, badminton was removed from the sports program. The sport later returned to the 2023 Arab Games in Algiers, Algeria with the team events discontinued.

== Previous winners ==
Year	Host	Men's singles	Women's singles	Men's doubles	Women's doubles	Mixed doubles	Men's team	Women's team
1999; Details	(Jordan); Amman	(Syria) Talal Derki	(Syria) Eva Katrib	(Syria) Bassel Al-Durrah (Syria) Talal Derki	(Syria) Eva Katrib (Syria) Rasha Al-Hassan	(Jordan) Tariq Mansour Elfawair (Jordan) Najwa Al-Turk	Syria	Syria
2004; Details	(Algeria); Algiers	(Syria) Tareq Shalhoum	(Syria) Hadil Kareem	(Algeria) Karim Rezig (Algeria) Zeradine Ammar	(Syria) Eva Katrib (Syria) Hadil Kareem	(Syria) Bassel Al-Dora (Syria) Hadil Kareem	Syria	Egypt
2007; Details	(Egypt); Cairo	(Algeria) Nabil Lasmari	(Syria) Hadil Kareem	(Algeria) Nabil Lasmari (Algeria) Karim Rezig	(Syria) Bushra Muhawesh (Syria) Hadil Kareem	(Syria) Bassel Al-Dora (Syria) Hadil Kareem	Algeria	Syria
2011	(Qatar); Doha	Not held						
2023; Details	Algeria (5 cities)^{a}	(Bahrain) Adnan Ebrahim	(Jordan) Maryam Abuarrah	(Algeria) Koceila Mammeri (Algeria) Youcef Sabri Medel	(Algeria) Linda Mazri (Algeria) Yasmina Chibah	(Algeria) Koceila Mammeri (Algeria) Tanina Mammeri	Not held	

^a Arab Games helds in 5 cities (Algiers, Oran, Constantine, Annaba and Tipaza). Badminton tournament helds in Algiers.

== Medal table ==
Rank	Nation	Gold	Silver	Bronze	Total
1	Syria (SYR)	15	4	6	25
2	Algeria (ALG)	7	8	7	22
3	Jordan (JOR)	2	8	11	21
4	Egypt (EGY)	1	5	12	18
5	Bahrain (BRN)	1	0	6	7
6	Iraq (IRQ)	0	0	6	6
7	Sudan (SUD)	0	0	1	1
Totals (7 entries)		26	25	49	100

== Participating nations ==
Nation	99	04	07	23	Years
Algeria	X	X	6	17	4
Bahrain	X	X	3	2	4
Egypt	X	X	10		3
Iraq	X	X	8	8	4
Jordan	X	X	8	4	4
Kuwait				4	1
Mauritania			1		1
Qatar				4	1
Saudi Arabia				8	1
Sudan			7		1
Syria	X	X	7		3
Tunisia				6	1
United Arab Emirates				8	1
Number of nations	6	6	8	10	
Number of athletes			51	69	
