= Morocco at the Islamic Solidarity Games =

- IOC code: MAR
- NOC: Moroccan Olympic Committee
- Medals Ranked 9th: Gold 50 Silver 46 Bronze 76 Total 172

Islamic Solidarity Games appearances (overview)
- 2005; 2013; 2017; 2021; 2025

Morocco has competed at every celebration of the Islamic Solidarity Games. Its athletes have won a total of 146 medals of whoom 50 gold, 46 silver, and 76 bronze, which make them ranked 9th in all-time medal table. Most medals gained in a tournament was 62 medals in the 2021 Islamic Solidarity Games, and most gold medal Secured in an Edition was 15 gold as well in 2021 Islamic Solidarity Games.

== Medal tables ==
=== Medals by Islamic Solidarity Games ===
Host nation

Below the table representing all Moroccan medals around the games. Till now, Morocco win 172 medals of whoom 50 gold, 46 silver, and 76 bronze.

Games	Athletes	Gold	Silver	Bronze	Total	Rank	Notes	RF
(Saudi Arabia) 2005 Mecca		8	6	4	18	6	details	
(Iran) 2010 Tehran	Canceled							
(Indonesia) 2013 Palembang		10	15	14	39	6	details	
(Azerbaijan) 2017 Baku		7	5	15	27	7	details	
(Turkey) 2021 Konya		15	13	34	62	6	details	
(Saudi Arabia) 2025 Riyadh		10	7	9	26	9	details	
(Malaysia) 2029 Selangor	Future event							
Total		50	46	76	172	9	-	-

== See also ==
- Morocco at the Olympics
- Morocco at the African Games
- Morocco at the Arab Games
- Morocco at the Mediterranean Games
- Morocco at the Paralympics
- Sports in Morocco
