= Bowling at the 2011 Arab Games =

Bowling at the 2011 Pan Arab Games
- Venue: Qatar Bowling Center
- Location: Doha, Qatar
- Dates: 11-15 December

At the 2011 Pan Arab Games, the bowling events were held at Qatar Bowling Center in Doha, Qatar from 11 to 15 December. A total of 6 events were contested.

== Medal summary ==
=== Men ===
Event	Gold	Silver	Bronze
Singles	Tarek Helmy (EGY)	Karim Sherif (EGY)	Mansour Al-Hajri (QAT)
Masters	Mubarak Al-Muraikhi (QAT)	Mohamed Janahi (BHR)	Sayed Al Hashemi (UAE)
All Events	Yusuf Falah (BHR)	Mubarak Al-Muraikhi (QAT)	Karim Sherif (EGY)
Doubles	Kuwait (KUW); Mohammad Alzaidan; Jasim Darwish	United Arab Emirates (UAE); Mahmood Al Attar; Jamal Ali	Qatar (QAT); Fahad Al-Emadi; Yousef Al-Jabir
Trios	Qatar (QAT); Mansour Al-Hajri; Yousef Al-Jabir; Mubarak Al-Muraikhi	Kuwait (KUW); Basel Alanzi; Mohammad Alzaidan; Jasim Darwish	Qatar (QAT); Fahad Al-Emadi; Abdulla Al-Jusaiman; Salem Al-Marzouqi
Teams of Five	Bahrain (BHR); Fawaz Abdulla; Mohamed Alshawoosh; Mahdi Asadalla; Yusuf Falah; Mohamed Janahi; Mohammed Sultan	Qatar (QAT); Fahad Al-Emadi; Mansour Al-Hajri; Yousef Al-Jabir; Abdulla Al-Jusaiman; Salem Al-Marzouqi; Mubarak Al-Muraikhi	United Arab Emirates (UAE); Mahmood Al Attar; Sayed Al Hashemi; Shaker Al Hassan; Hussain Al Suwaidi; Jamal Ali; Nayef Eqab

== Medal table ==
* Host nation (Qatar)

Rank	Nation	Gold	Silver	Bronze	Total
1	Qatar*	2	2	3	7
2	Bahrain	2	1	0	3
3	Egypt	1	1	1	3
4	Kuwait	1	1	0	2
5	United Arab Emirates	0	1	2	3
Totals (5 entries)		6	6	6	18
