= Stade du 5 Juillet =

Football stadium in Algeria

5 July Stadium ملعب 5 جويلية
- Interactive map of 5 July Stadium ملعب 5 جويلية
- Full name: 5 July 1962 Stadium
- Location: Route du 5 Juillet; Algiers, Algeria
- Coordinates: 36°45′35.6″N 02°59′42.7″E
- Owner: Ministry of Sport
- Capacity: 64,200
- Surface: AirFibr (hybrid grass)
- Record attendance: 114,000 Algeria-Nigeria (1990)

Construction
- Built: 1970
- Opened: 17 June 1972; 54 years ago
- Renovated: 1999, 2003, 2008, 2015, 2017, 2022

Tenants
- USM Alger; Algeria national football team (selected matches)

The 5 July 1962 Stadium (Arabic: ملعب 5 جويلية 1962), named after the day Algeria declared independence, is a football and athletics stadium located in Algiers, Algeria. The stadium was inaugurated in 1972 with a capacity of 80,000 (64,200 After the seats installed). It served as the main stadium of the 1975 Mediterranean Games, the 1978 All-Africa Games, the 2004 Pan Arab Games, and the 2007 All-Africa Games. The stadium was one of two venues for the 1990 African Cup of Nations (the other venue was the 19 May 1956 Stadium in Annaba). It hosted 9 matches of the tournament, including the final, which had a second record attendance of 105,302 spectators. The home team Algeria defeated Nigeria 1–0 in the final to win the tournament. The record attendance is of 110,000 spectators in a friendly match between Algeria and Serbia on 3 March 2010. It also hosted the 2000 African Championships in Athletics. After a formal compliance with current safety standards in 1999, the stadium was reduced to 64,200 capacity, and following a new phase of renovation in 2003. The future capacity will be 80,000 with possible further renovations.

== History ==
Opened in 1972 by President Houari Boumediene, it is home then the first tournament international networking selection Maghreb with players such qu'Allal, Filali, Bamous, Faras, Lalmas, Guedioura, Chekroun, the AC Milan with the Prati Albertosi, the Brazilian club Sociedade Esportiva Palmeiras with the famous Ademir da Guia. The White Pele before Zico, and the Spanish club of Valencia. It also Nacer Guedioura, father of the current Algerian international Adlène Guedioura who is the author of the first goal Official of this stadium during the final Cup of Algeria opposed the junior USM Alger to RC Kouba and which ended with a score of 1-0 for the USM Alger.

Then follow the Games Mediterranean, which are organized in 1975, the stadium had a capacity of 110,000 seats. But the record attendance was achieved in 1990, when the final of the African Cup of Nations, which contrasts the Algeria and Nigeria (1-0), with 105,302 spectators. After compliance with current safety standards 1999, the stadium is reduced to 80,200 places around, and following a new phase of renovation in 2003, the capacity is further reduced to 76,200 seats.

In 2008, 5 July 1962 Stadium once again experienced work, which shall include a new lawn and renovation of the stadium infrastructure. The works ended in the month of August 2009. The soccer friendly match between the national football teams of Algeria and Uruguay was held on August 12, 2009 on the occasion of the reopening of the stadium. The Algerians with a record of final 110,000 spectators during the friendly match Algeria–Serbia (lost 0–3, March 3, 2010). This is the first game of the Algerian national team since its qualification for the 2010 World Cup obtained in Sudan.

In March 2015, the natural sport turf has been replaced by the hybrid grass technology AirFibr.

== History of the stadium ==
=== Opening the stadium ===
After the coming of independence, there was great popular enthusiasm in Algeria for football. The construction of a large stadium in Algeria was an encouraging step for football and a step towards its support after independence by the late President Houari Boumediene. The date of the launching of the works during 1970 and the work lasted two years. The stadium was opened on 17 June 1972 in a friendly tournament involving 4 teams: the Arab Maghreb, AC Milan, Hungary and Palmeiras. The first goal of the stadium was for the Moroccan player Filali for the Maghreb team against Hungary, as the first official game on the pitch was the final of the Cup of Algeria 1972 between the two teams of the capital USM Alger and Hamra Annaba was the first official goal of the stadium to the Hamra Annaba player Tadjet where he won the meeting and the cup, as for the first game for the Algerian team on the pitch was in front of the Turkish team and won the Algerian team 1–0.

== See also ==
- List of football stadiums in Algeria
- Lists of stadiums

Events
Preceded by Atatürk Stadium; İzmir	Mediterranean Games; Main Venue; 1975	Succeeded by Gradski stadion u Poljudu; Split
Preceded by Surulere Stadium; Lagos	All Africa Games; Main Venue; 1978	Succeeded by Kasarani Stadium; Nairobi
Preceded by Stade Mohamed V Casablanca	African Cup of Nations; Final Venue; 1990	Succeeded by Stade Leopold Senghor; Dakar
Preceded by Stade Leopold Senghor; Dakar	African Championships in Athletics; Venue; 2000	Succeeded by Stade Hamadi Agrebi; Tunis
Preceded by Amman International Stadium; Amman	Pan Arab Games; Main Venue; 2004	Succeeded by International Stadium; Cairo
Preceded by Abuja Stadium; Abuja	All Africa Games; Main Venue; 2007	Succeeded by Zimpeto Stadium; Maputo
Preceded by Botswana National Stadium; Gaborone	African Youth Games; Main Venue; 2018	Succeeded by TBA; Maseru
Preceded by Godswill Akpabio International Stadium; Uyo	CAF Confederation Cup; Main Venue; 2023 (2nd leg)	Succeeded by TBA; To be determined
Preceded by Godswill Akpabio International Stadium; Doha	Arab Games; Main Venue; 2023	Succeeded by TBA; To be determined
