= Aden national football team results =

This page details the match results and statistics of the Aden national football team.

== Key ==
Key to matches

- Att.=Match attendance
- (H)=Home ground
- (A)=Away ground
- (N)=Neutral ground

Key to record by opponent

- Pld=Games played
- W=Games won
- D=Games drawn
- L=Games lost
- GF=Goals for
- GA=Goals against

== Results ==
Aden's score is shown first in each case.

No.	Date	Venue	Opponents	Score	Competition	Aden scorers	Att.	Ref.
1	2 September 1965	Cairo (N)	Palestine	0–1	1965 Pan Arab Games		—	
2	3 September 1965	Cairo (N)	United Arab Republic	0–14	1965 Pan Arab Games		—	
3	4 September 1965	Cairo (N)	Iraq	0–6	1965 Pan Arab Games		—	
4	7 September 1965	Cairo (N)	Lebanon	3–4	1965 Pan Arab Games	Unknown	—	

== Record by opponent ==
Team	Pld	W	D	L	GF	GA	GD	WPCT
Iraq	1	0	0	1	0	6	−6	0.00
Lebanon	1	0	0	1	3	4	−1	0.00
Palestine	1	0	0	1	0	1	−1	0.00
United Arab Republic	1	0	0	1	0	14	−14	0.00
Total	4	0	0	4	3	25	−22	0.00

Source: Results

== Notes ==
1. Note 1: The Aden national football team represented the State of Aden at the 1965 Pan Arab Games. The state existed as part of the Federation of South Arabia from 1963 until 1967 and the foundation of the People's Republic of South Yemen.
