= Athletics at the 1953 Arab Games =

Alexandria, Egypt

Athletics at the 1953 Pan Arab Games

The 1953 Arab Games, held in Alexandria, Egypt, between 26 July and 10 August 1953, featured 21 athletics events. Foot races ranged in length from 100 metres to a full marathon.

1953 Pan Arab Games

- Egypt, Alexandria
- July 26 – August 10

== MEN ==
=== 100m ===
MEDAL	ATHLETE	DOB	COUNTRY	MARK	W/I	RECORD	NOTES
	Emad El Din Shafei	1931	EGY	11.1			
	Yussed Zeid El Abdin		EGY	11.2			
	Abdul Hamid		EGY	11.4			

=== 200m ===
MEDAL	ATHLETE	DOB	COUNTRY	MARK	W/I	RECORD	NOTES
	Farouk Tadros		EGY	22.6			
	Emad El Din Shafei	1931	EGY	22.6			
	Yussed Zeid El Abdin		EGY	23.1			

=== 400m ===
MEDAL	ATHLETE	DOB	COUNTRY	MARK	W/I	RECORD	NOTES
	Farouk Tadros		EGY	50.5			
	Youssef Awad		EGY	51.8			
	Jasim Kareem	1938	IRQ	52.0			

=== 800m ===
MEDAL	ATHLETE	DOB	COUNTRY	MARK	W/I	RECORD	NOTES
	Fadl El Sayed		EGY	1:59.5			
	William Fahmi	1928	EGY	1:59.6			
	Hawary Hassan		EGY	2:00.4			

=== 1500m ===
MEDAL	ATHLETE	DOB	COUNTRY	MARK	W/I	RECORD	NOTES
	William Fahmi	1928	EGY	4:07.5			
	Fadl El Sayed		EGY	4:10.8			
	Abu Shadi		EGY	4:10.8			

=== 5000m ===
MEDAL	ATHLETE	DOB	COUNTRY	MARK	W/I	RECORD	NOTES
	Mahmoud El Rashidi		EGY	15:41.1			
	Yousef Thara		EGY	16:08.6			
	Bechar Andros		LBN	16:26.1			

=== 10,000m ===
MEDAL	ATHLETE	DOB	COUNTRY	MARK	W/I	RECORD	NOTES
	Mahmoud El Rashidi		EGY	33:05.2			
	Yousef Thara		EGY	35:38.8			
	Ali Hamed		EGY	35:43.6			

=== Marathon ===
MEDAL	ATHLETE	DOB	COUNTRY	MARK	W/I	RECORD	NOTES
	Hassan Abdelfattah	1920	EGY	2:31:50			
	Abdul Nabi		EGY	2:36:58			
	Mohamed Omran		EGY	2:39:04			

=== 110H ===
MEDAL	ATHLETE	DOB	COUNTRY	MARK	W/I	RECORD	NOTES
	Mohamed Suleiman		EGY	15.3			
	Fouad Yazghi	1932	EGY	15.4			
	Jamal Amin		IRQ	16.1			

=== 400H ===
MEDAL	ATHLETE	DOB	COUNTRY	MARK	W/I	RECORD	NOTES
	Nashad El Kholi		EGY	56.5			
	Jalal Al-Ghoul		EGY	59.1			
	Essam Badr		EGY	1:01.5			

=== HJ ===
MEDAL	ATHLETE	DOB	COUNTRY	MARK	W/I	RECORD	NOTES
	Emad El Din Shafei	1931	EGY	1.88			
	Hamza Kasim		IRQ	1.75			
	Osman Ismail		EGY	1.75			

=== PV ===
MEDAL	ATHLETE	DOB	COUNTRY	MARK	W/I	RECORD	NOTES
	Hamdi El Kafrawi		EGY	3.40			
	Mohamed Sayed Zaki		EGY	3.30			
	Ahmed Azam		LBN	3.10			

=== LJ ===
MEDAL	ATHLETE	DOB	COUNTRY	MARK	W/I	RECORD	NOTES
	Beg Dedeyan		EGY	7.05			
	Yarawant Parmakciyan		EGY	6.99			
	Abdel Aziz Alame		LBN	6.43			

=== TJ ===
MEDAL	ATHLETE	DOB	COUNTRY	MARK	W/I	RECORD	NOTES
	Fawzi Shaban	1930	EGY	14.12			
	Atif Ismail		EGY	13.62			
	Abdul Sattar Al-Razzak	1932	IRQ	13.51			

=== SP ===
MEDAL	ATHLETE	DOB	COUNTRY	MARK	W/I	RECORD	NOTES
	Gouda Attia		EGY	13.07			
	Mohamed Abu Al-Enein		EGY	12.65			
	Ibrahim Abu Al-Ala		EGY	12.07			

=== DT ===
MEDAL	ATHLETE	DOB	COUNTRY	MARK	W/I	RECORD	NOTES
	Ibrahim Abu Al-Ala		EGY	38.89			
	Ezzedine Mukhtar	1922	EGY	37.67			
	Ibrahim Abdallah		EGY	37.40			

=== HT ===
MEDAL	ATHLETE	DOB	COUNTRY	MARK	W/I	RECORD	NOTES
	Fabel El Hadji		LBN	29.29			
	Afif Boutros		LBN	29.17			
	Salem Jisr	1932	LBN	24.15			

=== JT ===
MEDAL	ATHLETE	DOB	COUNTRY	MARK	W/I	RECORD	NOTES
	Abdallah El Mardi		EGY	52.08			
	Mustafa Mohamed		EGY	51.42			
	Atif Ismail		EGY	48.98			

=== Decathlon ===
MEDAL	ATHLETE	DOB	COUNTRY	MARK	W/I	RECORD	NOTES
	Mohamed Sayed Zaki		EGY	4763			
	Mustafa Mohamed		EGY	4434			
	Rashid Khadr	1928	EGY	4360			

=== 4x100m ===
MEDAL	ATHLETE	DOB	COUNTRY	MARK	W/I	RECORD	NOTES
	-		EGY	43.8			
	-		EGY	43.8			
	Emad El Din Shafei	1931	EGY	43.8			
	Yussed Zeid El Abdin		EGY	43.8			
	-		IRQ	46.8			
	-		IRQ	46.8			
	-		IRQ	46.8			
	Jamal Amin		IRQ	46.8			
	-		LBN	47.0			
	-		LBN	47.0			
	-		LBN	47.0			
	-		LBN	47.0			

=== 4x400m ===
MEDAL	ATHLETE	DOB	COUNTRY	MARK	W/I	RECORD	NOTES
	-		EGY	3:27.7			
	-		EGY	3:27.7			
	-		EGY	3:27.7			
	-		EGY	3:27.7			
	-		IRQ	3:37.6			
	-		IRQ	3:37.6			
	-		IRQ	3:37.6			
	Jasim Kareem	1938	IRQ	3:37.6			
	-		LBN	3:43.7			
	-		LBN	3:43.7			
	-		LBN	3:43.7			
	-		LBN	3:43.7			
