= Iman Hasan Al-Rufaye =

Iraqi chess player

Personal information
- Full name: Iman Hasan Mohammed Al-Rufaye
- Born: 16 February 1982 (age 44)

Chess career
- Country: Iraq
- Title: Woman International Master (2001)
- FIDE rating: 2002 (January 2017)
- Peak rating: 2245 (July 1997)

Iman Hasan Mohammed Al-Rufaye (Arabic: إيمان حسن محمد الرفيعي, born 16 February 1982), also known as Eman Hassane Al-Rufei, is an Iraqi chess player who holds the FIDE title of Woman International Master (WIM). She is a Women's Chess Olympiads individual gold (1998) and silver (2000, 2006) medals winner.

== Biography ==
Since the late 1990s, Al-Rufaye has been one of the leading Iraqi chess players. She received the Woman FIDE Master (WFM) title in 1999 and the Woman International Master (WIM) title in 2001. In 2012, she won the Iraqi Women's Chess Championship with a hundred percent score - 9 out of 9 possible. In 2014, Al-Rufaye won 3rd place in Arab League Women's Chess Championship. In 2016, she ranked 28th in Asian Women's Chess Championship.

Al-Rufaye played for Iraq in the Women's Chess Olympiads:

- In 1998, at second board in the 33rd Chess Olympiad (women) in Elista (+7, =2, -0) and won individual gold medal,
- In 2000, at second board in the 34th Chess Olympiad (women) in Istanbul (+6, =4, -0) and won individual silver medal,
- In 2006, at first board in the 37th Chess Olympiad (women) in Turin (+7, =0, -1) and won individual silver medal,
- In 2012, at first board in the 40th Chess Olympiad (women) in Istanbul (+6, =2, -3),
- In 2016, at second board in the 42nd Chess Olympiad (women) in Baku (+5 =2, -3).

She also played for Iraq in the Pan Arab Games:

- In 2007, at first board in the 11th Pan Arab Games (women) in Cairo (+4, =0, -1) and won individual gold medal,
- In 2011, at second board in the 12th Pan Arab Games (women) in Doha (+6, =0, -1) and team bronze and individual gold medals.
