= Ibrahim Chahrani =

Libyan chess player

Personal information
- Born: 27 March 1972 (age 54)

Chess career
- Country: Libya
- Title: FIDE Master
- FIDE rating: 2230 (March 2019)
- Peak rating: 2358 (July 2000)

Ibrahim Chahrani (Arabic: إبراهيم الشهراني; born 27 March 1972) is a Libyan chess FIDE Master (FM) and Chess Olympiad individual gold medal winner (2004).

== Biography ==
In 2004, in Antalya, Ibrahim Chahrani shared third place in the Mediterranean Chess Championship. In 2007, he ranked fifth in the Arab Chess Championship.

Ibrahim Chahrani played for Libya in the Chess Olympiads:

- in 2004, at the second reserve board in the 36th Chess Olympiad in Calvià (+6, =1, -0), winning a gold medal,
- in 2006, at the first board in the 37th Chess Olympiad in Turin (+4, =3, -5),
- in 2008, at the third board in the 38th Chess Olympiad in Dresden (+3, =0, -6),
- in 2010, at the third board in the 39th Chess Olympiad in Khanty-Mansiysk (+5, =3, -2),
- in 2014, at the second board in the 41st Chess Olympiad in Tromsø (+0, =0, -11).

Ibrahim Chahrani played for Libya in the African Games:

- in 2003, at the reserve board in the 8th African Games in Abuja (+4, =1, -2),
- in 2007, at the second board in the 9th African Games in Algiers (+1, =2, -5).

Ibrahim Chahrani played for Libya in the Pan Arab Games:

- in 2007, at the fourth board in the 11th Pan Arab Games in Cairo (+3, =0, -4),
- in 2011, at the third board in the 12th Pan Arab Games in Doha (+3, =0, -5).
