= Oman at the Islamic Solidarity Games =

- IOC code: OMA
- NOC: Oman Olympic Committee
- Medals Ranked 23rd: Gold 6 Silver 9 Bronze 16 Total 31

Islamic Solidarity Games appearances (overview)
- 2005; 2013; 2017; 2021; 2025

Oman has competed in all editions of the Islamic Solidarity Games since its debut appearance at the inaugural event in Mecca in 2005. As of 2025, figures reported by the Islamic Solidarity Sports Federation indicate that athletes from Oman have earned a total of 31 medals, comprising 6 gold, 9 silver, and 16 bronze. In the overall standings, Oman ranks 23rd in the medal table following the most recent Islamic Solidarity Games, which were hosted in Riyadh, Saudi Arabia.

== Medal tables ==
=== Medals by Islamic Solidarity Games ===
Host nation

Below is the table representing all Omani medals in the games. Until now, Oman has won 31 medals (6 gold, 9 silver, and 16 bronze).

Games	Athletes	Gold	Silver	Bronze	Total	Rank	Notes	RF
(Saudi Arabia) 2005 Mecca		0	1	0	1	26th	details	
(Iran) 2010 Tehran	Canceled							
(Indonesia) 2013 Palembang		3	2	5	10	10th	details	
(Azerbaijan) 2017 Baku		0	3	4	7	28th	details	
(Turkey) 2021 Konya		1	1	2	4	24th	details	
(Saudi Arabia) 2025 Riyadh		2	2	5	9	21st	details	
(Malaysia) 2029 Selangor	Future event							
Total		6	9	16	31	23rd	-	-

== See also ==
- Oman at the Olympics
- Oman at the Paralympics
- Oman at the Asian Games
- Oman at the Arab Games
- Sports in Oman
