= Morocco at the Mediterranean Games =

- IOC code: MAR
- NOC: Moroccan National Olympic Committee
- Medals Ranked 10th: Gold 88 Silver 99 Bronze 135 Total 322

Mediterranean Games appearances (overview)
- 1959; 1963; 1967; 1971; 1975; 1979; 1983; 1987; 1991; 1993; 1997; 2001; 2005; 2009; 2013; 2018; 2022; 2026

Morocco has competed at every celebration of the Mediterranean Games since the 1959 Mediterranean Games. As of 2026 Mediterranean Games, Moroccan athletes have won a total of 322 medals.

== Medal tables ==
=== Medals by Mediterranean Games ===
Host nation

Below the table representing all Moroccan medals around the games. Till now, Morocco won 322 medals where 88 of them are gold.

| Games | Athletes | Gold | Silver | Bronze | Total | Rank |
| 1951 Alexandria | The country was under the French Occupation and thus they Did not participate | | | | | |
| 1955 Barcelona | The country was under the French Occupation and thus they Did not participate | | | | | |
| 1959 Beirut | 14 | 2 | 3 | 2 | 7 | 10 |
| 1963 Naples | 108 | 0 | 0 | 7 | 7 | 9 |
| 1967 Tunis | | 1 | 1 | 3 | 5 | 8 |
| 1971 İzmir | 76 | 0 | 2 | 6 | 8 | 9 |
| 1975 Algiers | 198 | 0 | 4 | 4 | 8 | 12 |
| 1979 Split | 106 | 0 | 2 | 3 | 5 | 12 |
| 1983 Casablanca | 251 | 8 | 5 | 7 | 20 | 7 |
| 1987 Latakia | 88 | 9 | 8 | 3 | 20 | 5 |
| 1991 Athens | 138 | 5 | 5 | 10 | 20 | 9 |
| 1993 Languedoc-Roussillon | 149 | 7 | 7 | 13 | 27 | 7 |
| 1997 Bari | 83 | 5 | 4 | 9 | 18 | 10 |
| 2001 Tunis | 117 | 6 | 4 | 5 | 15 | 10 |
| 2005 Almería | 142 | 3 | 6 | 3 | 12 | 12 |
| 2009 Pescara | 129 | 6 | 9 | 6 | 21 | 10 |
| 2013 Mersin | | 7 | 10 | 11 | 28 | 12 |
| 2018 Tarragona | 114 | 10 | 7 | 7 | 24 | 8 |
| 2022 Oran | 137 | 3 | 13 | 17 | 33 | 15 |
| 2026 Taranto | 123 | 16 | 9 | 19 | 44 | 7 |
| Total | | 88 | 99 | 135 | 322 | 10 |

== See also ==
- Morocco at the Olympics
- Morocco at the All-Africa Games
- Morocco at the Pan Arab Games
- Morocco at the Paralympics
- Sports in Morocco
