= Boxing at the 1957 Arab Games =

2.Pan Arab Games

Beirut, Lebanon

October 12–27, 1957

Finals (winners first)

51 kg	Mohamed Chico	MAR	Ali Abbas	LEB
54 kg	Hraizi Hattab	TUN	Samir Saad	LEB
57 kg	Ahmed El Amine	TUN	Abdel Ghani Samawi	IRQ
60 kg	Moncef Ziani	TUN	Ain Ben Mahmoud	MAR
63,5 kg	Khalid al-Kharkhi	IRQ	Ibrahim El Turk	LEB
67 kg	Ahmad Abu Al Saud	JRD	Nafie Monem	IRQ
71 kg	Mohamed Ben Mohamed	TUN	Amer Naji	IRQ
75 kg	Abdelaziz Salah El-Hasni	TUN	Sarkis Moussa	LEB
81 kg	Hedi Ben Othmane El-Nabli	TUN	Artine Melkounian	LEB
+81kg	Saad el-Din Dgheili	LEB	Habib Hammadi	TUN

Bronze Medal Winners

51 kg	Abdul Samad Ghazi	IRQ
57 kg	Mahmoud Bashir	LEB
60 kg	Akbel Azrfi	JRD
63,5 kg	Mohamed El Matoussi	TUN
67 kg	Mohammed Mubarak	LEB
71 kg	Antoine Achi	LEB
81 kg	Mohammed Abu Lassan	JRD
+81kg	Jarallah Halwaji	LIB
