= Palestine at the Islamic Solidarity Games =

- IOC code: PLE
- NOC: Palestine Olympic Committee
- Medals Ranked 41st: Gold 0 Silver 4 Bronze 5 Total 9

Islamic Solidarity Games appearances (overview)
- 2005; 2013; 2017; 2021; 2025

Palestine has competed in all editions of the Islamic Solidarity Games since its debut appearance at the inaugural event in Mecca in 2005. As of 2025, figures reported by the Islamic Solidarity Sports Federation indicate that athletes from Palestine have earned a total of 9 medals, comprising 4 silver, and 5 bronze. In the overall standings, Palestine ranks 41st in the medal table following the most recent Islamic Solidarity Games, which were hosted in Riyadh, Saudi Arabia.

== Medal tables ==
=== Medals by Islamic Solidarity Games ===
Host nation

Below is the table representing all Palestinian medals in the games. Until now, Palestine has won 9 medals (0 gold, 4 silver, and 5 bronze).

Games	Athletes	Gold	Silver	Bronze	Total	Rank	Notes	RF
(Saudi Arabia) 2005 Mecca		0	0	0	0	-	details	
(Iran) 2010 Tehran	Canceled							
(Indonesia) 2013 Palembang		0	1	0	1	22nd	details	
(Azerbaijan) 2017 Baku		0	0	0	0	-	details	
(Turkey) 2021 Konya		0	1	2	3	33rd	details	
(Saudi Arabia) 2025 Riyadh		0	2	3	5	29th	details	
(Malaysia) 2029 Selangor	Future event							
Total		0	4	5	9	41st	-	-

== See also ==
- Palestine at the Olympics
- Palestine at the Paralympics
- Palestine at the Asian Games
- Palestine at the Arab Games
- Sports in Palestine
