= Aimen Rizouk =

Algerian chess grandmaster (born 1979)

Personal information
- Born: 3 August 1979 (age 46) Algiers, Algeria

Chess career
- Country: Algeria
- Title: Grandmaster (2007)
- FIDE rating: 2425 (July 2026)
- Peak rating: 2540 (March 2010)

Aimen Rizouk (born 3 August 1979) is an Algerian chess player born in Algiers. He was the first Algerian player to be awarded the title of Grandmaster (GM) by FIDE in 2007.

== Chess career ==
Rizouk won the Algerian Chess Championship in 1999. In international team chess competitions, he represented Algeria in the 1994 and 2008 Chess Olympiads, and won a gold and a bronze medal at the 2007 Pan Arab Games.

He played in the Chess World Cup 2000, where he finished at the bottom of Group C, the FIDE World Chess Championship 2002, where he was defeated by Alexei Shirov in the first round,
