= Athletics at the 1961 Arab Games =

1961 Pan Arab Games in Casablanca

Athletics at the 1961 Pan Arab Games

1961 Pan Arab Games

- Morocco, Casablanca
- August 24 – September 8

== MEN ==
=== 100m ===
MEDAL	ATHLETE	DOB	COUNTRY	MARK	W/I	RECORD	NOTES
	Bouchaib El Maachi	1943	MAR	10.2	w		
	Tayssir Abdel Hay		EGY	10.8	w		
	Abderrahmane Medkouri		MAR	10.8	w		

=== 200m ===
MEDAL	ATHLETE	DOB	COUNTRY	MARK	W/I	RECORD	NOTES
	Bouchaib El Maachi	1943	MAR	21.2		CR	
	Hassan Ahmed Ragab		EGY	21.8			
	Tayssir Abdel Hay		EGY	22.1			

=== 400m ===
MEDAL	ATHLETE	DOB	COUNTRY	MARK	W/I	RECORD	NOTES
	Hassan Ahmed Ragab		EGY	49.3		CR	
	Zouaki Bentahar		MAR	49.3			
	. El Imane		MAR	49.8			

=== 800m ===
MEDAL	ATHLETE	DOB	COUNTRY	MARK	W/I	RECORD	NOTES
	Nabil Hassan		EGY	1:52.9		CR	
	. Aomar		MAR	1:53.7			
	. Mejd		EGY	1:54.0			

=== 1500m ===
MEDAL	ATHLETE	DOB	COUNTRY	MARK	W/I	RECORD	NOTES
	Mohamed Benhammadi		MAR	4:02.8			
	Abdeslam Bouchta		MAR	4:02.9			
	. Mejd		EGY	4:03.0			

=== 5000m ===
MEDAL	ATHLETE	DOB	COUNTRY	MARK	W/I	RECORD	NOTES
	Said Gerouani Benmoha	1934	MAR	14:53.2			
	Aloui Saoud		EGY	14:53.3			
	Allal Benlahcen		MAR	14:54.9			

=== 10,000m ===
MEDAL	ATHLETE	DOB	COUNTRY	MARK	W/I	RECORD	NOTES
	Allal Benlahcen		MAR	31:31.2		CR	
	Mohamed Saoud		EGY	31:31.5			
	. Abdelkader		EGY	31:34.4			

=== Marathon ===
MEDAL	ATHLETE	DOB	COUNTRY	MARK	W/I	RECORD	NOTES
	Hassan Benmohamed		MAR	2:44:44			
	Mahmoud Abdelkerim		EGY	2:50:05			
	Said Mouini		MAR	3:00:52			

=== 3000SC ===
MEDAL	ATHLETE	DOB	COUNTRY	MARK	W/I	RECORD	NOTES
	Abdeslam Bouchta		MAR	9:24.7			
	. Ben Mohamed		MAR	9:33.9			
	Youssef Abu Saoud		EGY	9:56.2			

=== 110H ===
MEDAL	ATHLETE	DOB	COUNTRY	MARK	W/I	RECORD	NOTES
	Abdel Moneim Abdallah		EGY	14.9		CR	
	Isaac Elie	1928	SUD	14.9			
	. Baighoute		MAR	16.0			

=== 400H ===
MEDAL	ATHLETE	DOB	COUNTRY	MARK	W/I	RECORD	NOTES
	Zouaki Bentahar		MAR	53.8		CR	
	Abdel Moneim Abdallah		EGY	54.4			
	Mohamed Darwish Zaky		EGY	55.3			

=== HJ ===
MEDAL	ATHLETE	DOB	COUNTRY	MARK	W/I	RECORD	NOTES
	Hassan Nassif		EGY	1.89		CR	
	. Eddine		EGY	1.86			
	. Irek		SUD	1.86			

=== PV ===
MEDAL	ATHLETE	DOB	COUNTRY	MARK	W/I	RECORD	NOTES
	Farid Hanna		SYR	3.75		CR=	
	. Bellal		MAR	3.40			
	Yamadou Fofana		MAR	3.20			

=== LJ ===
MEDAL	ATHLETE	DOB	COUNTRY	MARK	W/I	RECORD	NOTES
	Teymourlenk Shoukri	1939	EGY	7.20		CR	
	Mahmoud Atif Abdel Fattah		EGY	7.14			
	Yamadou Fofana		MAR	6.86			

=== TJ ===
MEDAL	ATHLETE	DOB	COUNTRY	MARK	W/I	RECORD	NOTES
	Teymourlenk Shoukri	1939	EGY	15.15		CR	
	Mahmoud Atif Abdel Fattah		EGY	14.73			
	. Namir		MAR	13.67			

=== SP ===
MEDAL	ATHLETE	DOB	COUNTRY	MARK	W/I	RECORD	NOTES
	Shebel Hassan Farag		EGY	15.00		CR	
	Salem Jisr	1932	LBN	13.87			
	Mohamed Abu Al-Enein		EGY	13.78			

=== DT ===
MEDAL	ATHLETE	DOB	COUNTRY	MARK	W/I	RECORD	NOTES
	Shebel Hassan Farag		EGY	44.67		CR	
	Mohamed Sayed Zaki		EGY	43.71			
	Afif Boutros		LBN	41.55			

=== HT ===
MEDAL	ATHLETE	DOB	COUNTRY	MARK	W/I	RECORD	NOTES
	Merouane Bitar		SYR	47.84		CR	
	Michel Skaff		LBN	46.86			
	Rameh Kheireddine		LBN	42.26			

=== JT ===
MEDAL	ATHLETE	DOB	COUNTRY	MARK	W/I	RECORD	NOTES
	Hani Latouf		LBN	58.98		CR	
	. Riad		EGY	56.77			
	Mustafa Mohamed		EGY	54.42			

=== 20kmW ===
MEDAL	ATHLETE	DOB	COUNTRY	MARK	W/I	RECORD	NOTES
	Mohamed El Sayed (I)		EGY	1:56:48			

=== 50kmW ===
MEDAL	ATHLETE	DOB	COUNTRY	MARK	W/I	RECORD	NOTES
	Kamoun Benbadaoui		MAR	6:22:12			

=== Decathlon ===
MEDAL	ATHLETE	DOB	COUNTRY	MARK	W/I	RECORD	NOTES
	Mahmoud Atif Abdel Fattah		EGY	5413	pts	CR	
	Abdelgani Bellal		MAR	5321	pts		
	Yamadou Fofana		MAR	5295	pts		

=== 4x100m ===
MEDAL	ATHLETE	DOB	COUNTRY	MARK	W/I	RECORD	NOTES
	-		MAR	42.4		CR	
	-		MAR	42.4		CR	
	-		MAR	42.4		CR	
	Bouchaib El Maachi	1943	MAR	42.4		CR	
	-		EGY	42.5			
	-		EGY	42.5			
	-		EGY	42.5			
	-		EGY	42.5			
	-		LBN	45.2			
	-		LBN	45.2			
	-		LBN	45.2			
	-		LBN	45.2			

=== 4x400m ===
MEDAL	ATHLETE	DOB	COUNTRY	MARK	W/I	RECORD	NOTES
	-		EGY	3:19.9		CR	
	-		EGY	3:19.9		CR	
	-		EGY	3:19.9		CR	
	-		EGY	3:19.9		CR	
	-		MAR	3:33.4			
	-		MAR	3:33.4			
	-		MAR	3:33.4			
	-		MAR	3:33.4			
