= Football at the 1997 Arab Games =

1997 Arab Games football tournament
Tournament details
- Host country: Lebanon
- City: Beirut
- Dates: 13–27 July 1997
- Teams: 8 (from 2 confederations)
- Venue: 2 (in 2 host cities)

Final positions
- Champions: Jordan (1st title)
- Runners-up: Syria
- Third place: Lebanon
- Fourth place: Kuwait B

Tournament statistics
- Matches played: 16
- Goals scored: 48 (3 per match)
- Top scorer: (Lebanon) Abdulfattah Chehab (5 goals)

The 1997 Arab Games football tournament was the 8th edition of the Arab Games men's football tournament. The football tournament was held in Beirut, Lebanon between 13–27 July 1997 as part of the 1997 Arab Games.

== Participating teams ==
Eight teams took part to the tournament, Kuwait participated with the reserve team and United Arab Emirates with the U21 team. The following countries have participated for the final tournament:

- Jordan
- Kuwait B
- Lebanon (hosts)
- Libya
- Mauritania
- Oman
- Syria
- United Arab Emirates U21

== Group stage ==
=== Group A ===
| Team | Pld | W | D | L | GF | GA | GD | Pts |
|---|---|---|---|---|---|---|---|---|
| Jordan | 3 | 1 | 2 | 0 | 5 | 3 | +2 | 5 |
| Lebanon | 3 | 1 | 2 | 0 | 4 | 3 | +1 | 5 |
| Libya | 3 | 0 | 2 | 1 | 4 | 5 | −1 | 2 |
| Oman | 3 | 0 | 2 | 1 | 4 | 6 | −2 | 2 |

13 July 1997

| Lebanon | 1–1 | Jordan |
|---|---|---|
| Chehab 38' | | Abu Hantash 48' |

Camille Chamoun Stadium, Beirut, Lebanon
14 July 1997

| Libya | 2–2 | Oman |
|---|---|---|
| Saada 60'; Ramadan 75' | Report | Al-Hamdan 84'; Ahmad Ali 85' |

Camille Chamoun Stadium, Beirut, Lebanon

16 July 1997

| Lebanon | 1–1 | Oman |
|---|---|---|
| Chehab 26' | Report | Al-Dhabit 21' |

Camille Chamoun Stadium, Beirut, Lebanon
17 July 1997

| Jordan | 1–1 | Libya |
|---|---|---|
| Al-Sheyab (?) | | (?) |

Camille Chamoun Stadium, Beirut, Lebanon

19 July 1997

| Lebanon | 2–1 | Libya |
|---|---|---|
| Chehab 81' (pen.); Karapetyan 88' | Report | Muftah 34' |

Camille Chamoun Stadium, Beirut, Lebanon
20 July 1997

| Jordan | 3–1 | Oman |
|---|---|---|
| Al-Sheyab; Abu-Abed; Tadrus | | (?) |

Camille Chamoun Stadium, Beirut, Lebanon

=== Group B ===
| Team | Pld | W | D | L | GF | GA | GD | Pts |
|---|---|---|---|---|---|---|---|---|
| Syria | 3 | 3 | 0 | 0 | 6 | 2 | +4 | 9 |
| Kuwait B | 3 | 2 | 0 | 1 | 5 | 3 | +2 | 6 |
| United Arab Emirates U21 | 3 | 1 | 0 | 2 | 3 | 5 | −2 | 3 |
| Mauritania | 3 | 0 | 0 | 3 | 2 | 6 | −4 | 0 |

13 July 1997

| Kuwait B | 3–1 | Mauritania |
|---|---|---|
| Youssouf 24'; Al-Otaibi 53'; Al-Omran 58' | Report | Mahmoud 90' |

Tripoli Municipal Stadium, Tripoli, Lebanon
14 July 1997

| Syria | 3–1 | UA Emirates U21 |
|---|---|---|
| Bayazid 18', 52'; Taleb 44' | Report | El Ballouchi 49' |

Tripoli Municipal Stadium, Tripoli, Lebanon

16 July 1997

| Syria | 2–1 | Kuwait B |
|---|---|---|
| Jokhadar 67', 80' | Report | Azis 85' |

Tripoli Municipal Stadium, Tripoli, Lebanon
17 July 1997

| UA Emirates U21 | 2–1 | Mauritania |

Tripoli Municipal Stadium, Tripoli, Lebanon

19 July 1997

| Kuwait B | 1–0 | UA Emirates U21 |

Tripoli Municipal Stadium, Tripoli, Lebanon
20 July 1997

| Syria | 1–0 | Mauritania |

Tripoli Municipal Stadium, Tripoli, Lebanon

== Knockout stage ==
Semifinals
23 July – Beirut
Jordan | 3
Kuwait B | 2
24 July – Beirut
Syria (a.e.t.) | 3
Lebanon | 2

Final
27 July – Beirut
Jordan | 1
Syria | 0
Third place
26 July – Beirut
Lebanon | 3
Kuwait B | 1

=== Semifinals ===
23 July 1997

| Jordan | 3–2 | Kuwait B |
|---|---|---|
| Al-Sheyab 43', 55'; Tadrus 90' | Report | Moueidi 2'; Oneizi 90+2' |

Beirut
Attendance: 1,000

24 July 1997

| Lebanon | 2–3 (a.e.t.) | Syria |
|---|---|---|
| Chehab 22' (pen.), 79' (pen.) | Report | Bayazid 77'; Karapetyan 85' (o.g.); Jabban 100' |

Camille Chamoun Stadium, Beirut, Lebanon
Attendance: 40,000
Referee: Mohammed Abdallah

=== Third place Match ===
27 July 1997

| Lebanon | 3–1 | Kuwait B |
|---|---|---|
| Hassoun 2', 22'; Abdallah 57' | Report | Rahman 7' |

Camille Chamoun Stadium, Beirut, Lebanon
Attendance: 15,000

=== Final ===
27 July 1997

| Jordan | 1–0 | Syria |
|---|---|---|
| Tadrus 84' |

Camille Chamoun Stadium, Beirut, Lebanon

== Final ranking ==
| Pos | Team | Pld | W | D | L | GF | GA | GD | Pts | Final result |
|---|---|---|---|---|---|---|---|---|---|---|
| 1st place, gold medalist(s) | Jordan | 5 | 3 | 2 | 0 | 9 | 5 | +4 | 11 | Gold Medal |
| 2nd place, silver medalist(s) | Syria | 5 | 4 | 0 | 1 | 9 | 5 | +4 | 12 | Silver Medal |
| 3rd place, bronze medalist(s) | Lebanon (H) | 5 | 2 | 2 | 1 | 9 | 7 | +2 | 8 | Bronze Medal |
| 4 | Kuwait B | 5 | 2 | 0 | 3 | 8 | 9 | −1 | 6 | Fourth place |
| 5 | United Arab Emirates U21 | 3 | 1 | 0 | 2 | 3 | 5 | −2 | 3 | Eliminated in group stage |
| 6 | Libya | 3 | 0 | 2 | 1 | 4 | 5 | −1 | 2 | Eliminated in group stage |
| 7 | Oman | 3 | 0 | 2 | 1 | 4 | 6 | −2 | 2 | Eliminated in group stage |
| 8 | Mauritania | 3 | 0 | 0 | 3 | 2 | 6 | −4 | 0 | Eliminated in group stage |

Source: rsssf
(H) Hosts

1997 Arab Games

Jordan
First title
