= Sport in Morocco =

Sports in Morocco refers to the sports played in the Kingdom of Morocco. As of 2007, Moroccan society participated in many sports, including handball, football, golf, tennis, basketball, and athletics. Hicham El Guerrouj, a middle distance runner, won two gold medals for Morocco at the Athletics at the 2004 Summer Olympics.

Association football has historically been particularly popular amongst persons of African descent and is Morocco's most popular sport. Other popular sports include athletics, Futsal, basketball, boxing, golf, netball, swimming, surfing and tennis.

== Ministry of Youth and Sports ==
The Moroccan Ministry of Youth and Sports was founded in August 1964 and houses all the sporting federations in the country. Despite the Ministry's mission to engage young people in sporting opportunities, many Moroccan athletes denounce the institution as not giving young Moroccans enough sponsorship or opportunities to play sports professionally.

== Host of events ==
Morocco will host the FIFA World Cup in 2030 with Portugal and Spain to be the first by more than one continent to host the tournament which Morocco finally won the right having failed five times. It will be the first time that Morocco has hosted it, the second country in African after 2010 in South Africa, the second Arab country after Qatar in 2022 and the first in North Africa.

Morocco hosted the 2019 African Games in Rabat; it was the first time that the country hosted the event. It was the largest African Games ever and the largest sporting event to be hosted by Morocco.

In 2019, it was announced that Morocco would host the inaugural African Para Games in Rabat in January 2020. however, due to poor relations between the Africa Paralympic Committee and the country's authorities, Morocco withdrew and the event took place in Cairo, Egypt.

Morocco has hosted many international events such as the 1988 African Cup of Nations, 2013 FIFA Club World Cup, 2014 FIFA Club World Cup, 2018 African Nations Championship, 2022 Women's Africa Cup of Nations, 2022 FIFA Club World Cup, 2024 Women's Africa Cup of Nations and the 2025 Africa Cup of Nations. Most of the events hosted are football related since it is the most popular sport in the country.

Other events hosted include:

- 1961 Pan Arab Games
- 1983 Mediterranean Games
- 1983 Palestine Cup of Nations for Youth
- 1985 Pan Arab Games
- 1997 African Youth Championship
- 2011 CAF Beach Soccer Championship
- 2011 African U-23 Championship
- 2011 Arab Cup U-20
- 2013 CAF Beach Soccer Championship
- 2013 African U-17 Championship
- 2019 African Games
- 2020 Africa Futsal Cup of Nations
- 2023 U-23 Africa Cup of Nations

== By Sport ==
=== Football ===
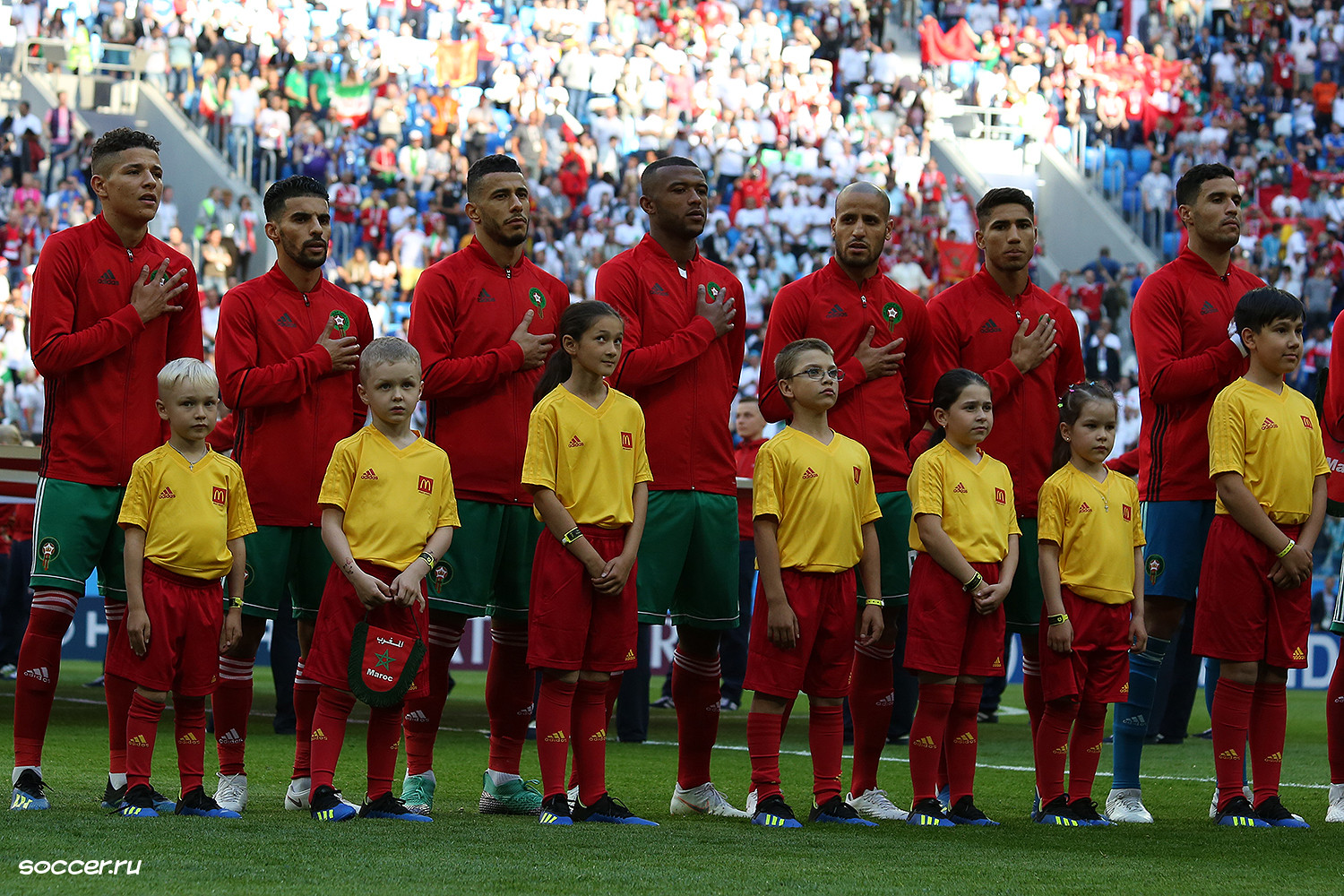
Morocco at the 2018 FIFA World Cup in Russia

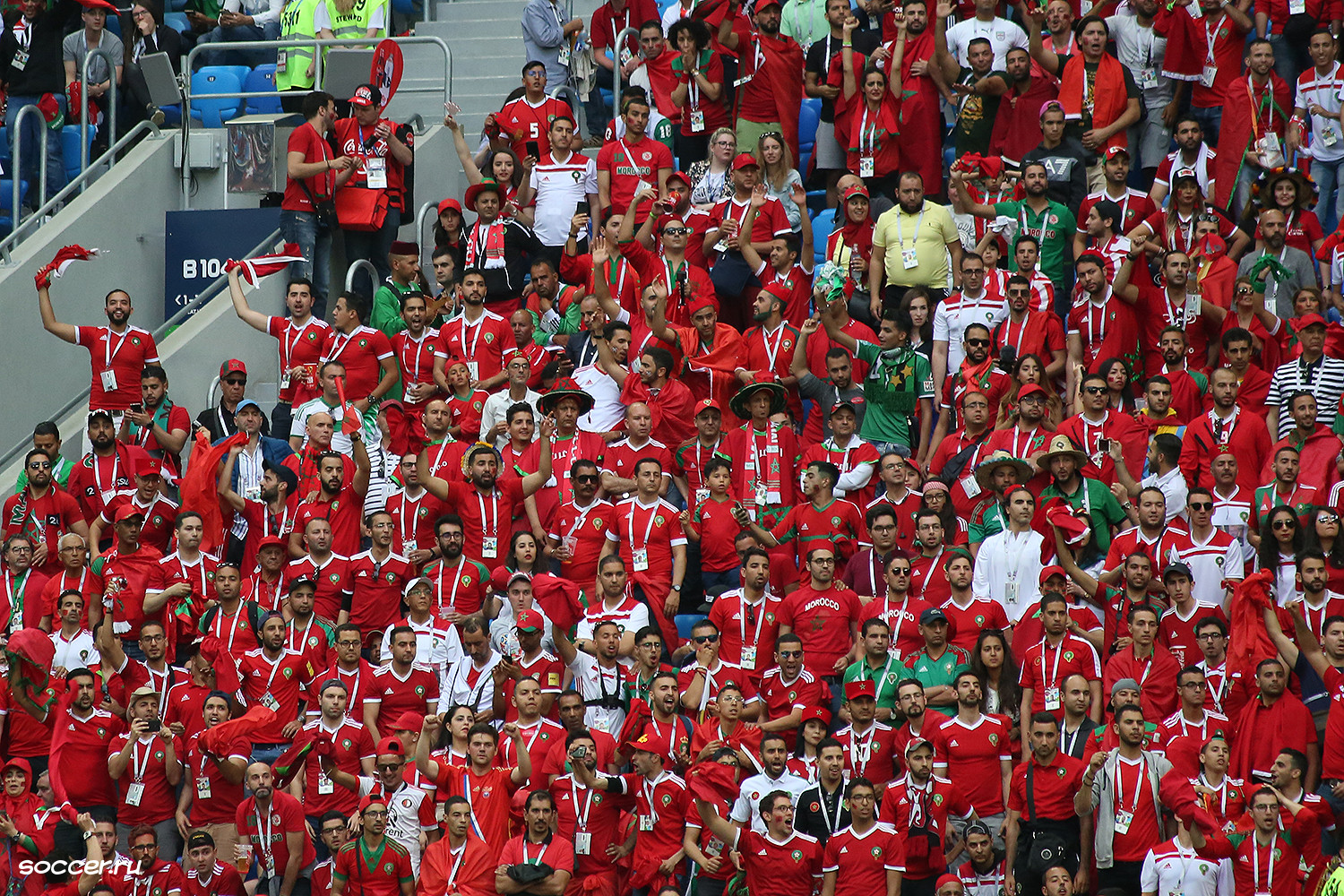
Moroccan football fans at the 2018 FIFA World Cup

The Royal Moroccan Football Federation based in Rabat is the governing body of football in Morocco. Morocco qualified for the FIFA World Cup six times and bid for the World Cups 1994, 1998, 2006, 2010 and 2026 but lost out to United States, France, Germany, South Africa and Canada/Mexico/United States in these bids. On 4 October 2023, The FIFA Executive Committee has unanimously accepted the Morocco-Spain-Portugal bid as a candidate to host the 2030 FIFA World Cup.

- Morocco national football team
- Morocco national under-23 football team
- Morocco national under-20 football team
- Morocco women's national football team
- Botola
- Botola 2
- National

==== Botola ====
The "Botola" Pro is the top league competition for football clubs in Morocco. Each season 16 teams compete for the championship. Champion and runner-up participate in the African Champions League. The most successful clubs in the league are: AS FAR, and Wydad Casablanca, and Raja Casablanca.

The Moroccan top-flight has produced the second-highest number of CAF Champions League titles, with three Moroccan clubs having won seven African trophies in total. They also produced the highest number of CAF Confederation Cup titles, with five Moroccan clubs having won seven African confederation trophies.

=== Futsal ===
Morocco's popularity for Futsal has risen over the years due to its similarity to football. Morocco national futsal team is a major force in the African and Arab world. They hosted the 2020 Africa Futsal Cup of Nations and the 2024 Futsal Africa Cup of Nations. Their first major trophy came in 2016, after defeating Egypt in the final. They have won the Africa Futsal Cup of Nations four times. They also won the Arab Futsal Cup three times.

Morocco qualified for the FIFA Futsal World Cup three times, Their best performance was in 2021, where they reached the round of 16. Morocco is the only African and Arab country to have won the Futsal Confederations Cup.

=== Handball ===
Handball in Morocco is organized by the Royal Moroccan Handball Federation. The sport is practiced at club and national levels, with men's and women's national teams competing in African and international tournaments.

=== Equestrian sports ===
Morocco has a diverse equestrian sports community headed by the Royal Moroccan Equestrian Federation. Morocco's most famous equestrian, Abdelkebir Ouaddar, represented the country in the 2014 Normandy World Equestrian Games and 2016 Summer Olympics in Rio de Janeiro, Brazil.

=== Motorsport ===
- Moroccan Grand Prix (Formula One, sports car, and touring car racing)
- Marrakech Street Circuit (World Touring Car Championship)
- Rallye du Maroc (Held between 1934 and 1988, included in the World Rally Championhip three times during the 1970s)
- Rallye du Maroc (rally raid) (Held since 2000)
- Miss Moto Maroc (all female motorcycle club in Morocco)

The first Moroccan racing driver in international competition was Max Cohen-Olivar. A winner of multiple Moroccan national titles driving Renaults and BMWs, he specialised in sports car racing from the early 1970s, finishing fifth in the 1970 edition of the 1000 km of Paris before making his debut at the 24 Hours of Le Mans the following year. He went on to compete at Le Mans 20 times up to 2001, with his best results being twelfth places in the 1982 and 2001 editions of the race, additionally finishing second in the Group 5 class in the earlier year driving a Lancia Montecarlo. He also raced in the World Sportscar Championship and the FIA GT Championship.

Mehdi Bennani is Morocco's most notable racing driver. He has competed in the World Touring Car Championship since 2009, where he has scored a number of top three finishes. In 2014 he scored his first WTCC win at the championship's Shanghai round.

=== Cricket ===
- Morocco national cricket team

Morocco hosted the 2002 Morocco Cup, which was well attended. Sri Lanka beat South Africa in the final.

Morocco boasts an ICC approved ground capable of hosting full internationals, the National Cricket Stadium in Tangier. It has so far hosted a One Day International triangular tournament, the Morocco Cup in 2002, where Sri Lanka won ahead of South Africa and Pakistan.

=== Basketball ===
Morocco, represented by the Moroccan Royal Basketball Federation, has been affiliated to FIBA since 1936. The men's national team has won one FIBA Africa Championship title in 1965. The professional national league is Nationale 1. On 16 July 2023, Morocco won the 2023 FIBA AfroCan Final after beating Cote d'Ivoire 78-76 that took place in Luanda, Angola, Thus marking their first continental trophy since 1965.

=== Women's volleyball ===
Morocco has a successful women's national volleyball team which lastly qualified for the 2021 Women's African Nations Volleyball Championship where it won the bronze medal.

=== Rugby union ===
Rugby union came to Morocco in the early 20th century, mainly by the French who occupied the country. As a result, Moroccan rugby was tied to the fortunes of France, during the first and second World War, with many Moroccan players going away to fight. Like many other Maghreb nations, Moroccan rugby tended to look to Europe for inspiration, rather than to the rest of Africa.

Notable Moroccan players include:

- Abdelatif Benazzi
- Said Boucha
- Abdellatif Boutaty
- Rachid Karmouchi
- Djalil Narjissi

=== Ice Hockey ===
Morocco was admitted into the International Ice Hockey Federation on May 22, 2010.

== Stadiums ==
- Stade d'Agadir
- Stade Cheikh Laaghdef
- Stade Complexe Sportif
- Honor Stadium
- Stade Larbi Zaouli
- Stade Mohammed V
- Stade Moulay Abdellah
- Stade de Tanger
- Stade de Marrakech
- Complexe OCP
- Saniat Rmel
- Stade Al Inbiaâte
- Stade El Abdi
- Stade El Harti
- Stade El Massira
- Stade Marche Verte
- Stade Municipal (Kenitra)
- Stade Sidi Bernoussi
- Stade d'Honneur (Meknes)
- Stade de Marchan
- Stade du 20 Août
- Complexe Al Amal de Casablanca

== See also ==
- Morocco at the Olympics
- Morocco men's national handball team
- Morocco - Golf Holidays
