= Yosra Alaa El Din =

Egyptian chess player (born 1986)

Personal information
- Born: 1986 (age 39–40)

Chess career
- Country: Egypt
- Title: Woman International Master (2008)
- FIDE rating: 1801 (October 2012)
- Peak rating: 1959 (January 2008)

Yosra Alaa El Din (born 1986) is an Egyptian chess player who holds the title of Woman International Master (WIM, 2008).

In 2007, Yosra Alaa El Din won a bronze medal in the African Women's Chess Championship in Windhoek. For this success FIDE awarded her title of Woman International Master (WIM). She also won an individual gold medal playing for Egypt on board 1 at the 2007 All-Africa Games. In 2008, Yosra Alaa El Din participated in the Women's World Chess Championship in Nalchik, where she lost to Humpy Koneru in the first round. She played for Egypt at two Women's Chess Olympiads.

Since 2012, she has not participated in chess tournaments.
