= Union of Arab National Olympic Committees =

International organization

Union of Arab National Olympic Committees إتحاد اللجان الأولمبية الوطنية العربية

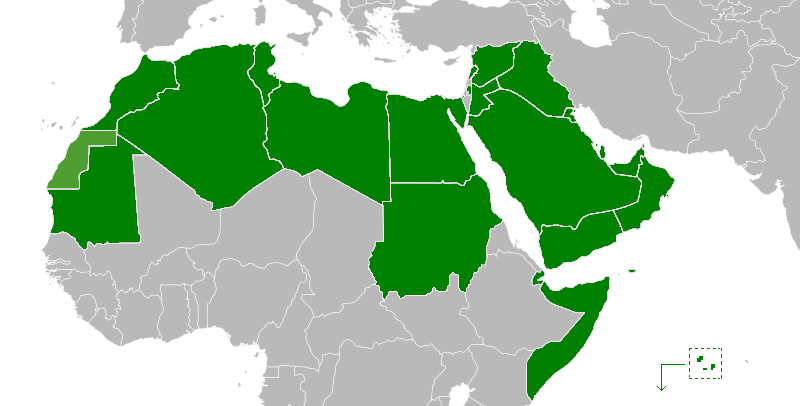
- Countries members
- Formation: May 1976
- Type: Sports federation
- Headquarters: (Saudi Arabia) Riyadh
- Members: 22 National Olympic Committees (12 Asia + 10 Africa)
- Official language: Arabic
- President: Nawaf bin Faisal
- Website: http://uanoc.org

The Union of Arab National Olympic Committees (acronym: UANOC; Arabic: إتحاد اللجان الأولمبية الوطنية العربية) is an international organization that unites the 22 National Olympic Committees (NOCs) of the Arab world. It is headquartered in Riyadh, Saudi Arabia.

== History ==
In May 1976, in a conference of Arab olympic committees held in Riyadh (Saudi Arabia), members decided to establish a union called the Arab Sports Confederation (ASC). The goals of the confederation are the advancement of the Olympic movement and sports in the Arab countries, develop and maintain the rules and principles of the Olympic, encourage and protect the hobby, as well as cooperation with the Arab and international sports organizations. Riyadh was chosen as the headquarters of the confederation and Prince Faisal bin Fahd was elected as its President until his death in 1999. The Arab Sports Confederation changed its name to Union of Arab National Olympic Committees (UANOC) in 2008.

== Activities ==
The most important activities of the union, attend international and continental meetings that act for youth and sports both, contribute to the organization of Arab sports tournaments, supervision and the establishment of tournaments, seminars, sports medicine and sports media, management and administration and sports photography.

== Member federations ==
1. Arab Chess Federation - 1975
2. Arab Handball Federation - 1975
3. Union of Arab Football Associations - 1974
4. Arab Basketball Federation
5. Arab Volleyball Association - 1975
6. Arab Athletics Federation - 1975
7. Arab Swimming Confederation (ASC)
8. Arab Badminton Federation (ABF)
9. Arab Table Tennis Federation (ATTF)
10. Arab Weightlifting Federation
11. Arab Rugby Federation - 2012
12. Arab Ice Hockey Federation
13. Arab Gymnastics Union
14. Arab Bodybuilding Federation
15. Arab Judo Federation - 1977
16. Arab Taekwondo Federation
17. Arab Karate Federation
18. Arab Tennis Federation
19. Arab Golf Federation
20. Arab Wushu Federation
21. Arab Fencing Federation
22. Arab Cycling Federation
23. Arab Rowing Federation
24. Arab Sailing Federation
25. Arab Triathlon Federation
26. Arab Wrestling Federation
27. Arab Billiards and Snooker Federation
28. Arab Archery Federation
29. Arab Shooting Federation
30. Arab Boxing Federation
31. Arab Bowling Federation
32. Arab Squash Federation
33. Arab Bridge Federation
34. Arab Squash Federation - 1983
35. Arab Kickboxing Federation
36. Arab Muaythai Federation
37. Arab Canoeing Federation

== Member countries ==
Nation	Code	National Olympic Committee	Created	Ref.
Algeria	ALG	Algerian Olympic Committee	1963/1964	
Bahrain	BRN	Bahrain Olympic Committee	1978/1979	
Comoros	COM	Comité Olympique et Sportif des Iles Comores	1979/1993	
Djibouti	DJI	Comité National Olympique Djiboutien	1983/1984	
Egypt	EGY	Egyptian Olympic Committee	1910	
Iraq	IRQ	National Olympic Committee of Iraq	1948	
Jordan	JOR	Jordan Olympic Committee	1957/1963	
Kuwait	KUW	Kuwait Olympic Committee	1957/1966	
Lebanon	LBN	Lebanese Olympic Committee	1947/1948	
Libya	LBA	Libyan Olympic Committee	1962/1963	
Mauritania	MTN	Comité National Olympique et Sportif Mauritanien	1962/1979	
Morocco	MAR	Moroccan Olympic Committee	1959	
Oman	OMA	Oman Olympic Committee	1982	
Palestine	PLE	Palestine Olympic Committee	1995	
Qatar	QAT	Qatar Olympic Committee	1979/1980	
Saudi Arabia	KSA	Saudi Arabian Olympic Committee	1964/1965	
Somalia	SOM	Somali Olympic Committee	1959/1972	
Sudan	SUD	Sudan Olympic Committee	1956/1959	
Syria	SYR	Syrian Olympic Committee	1948	
Tunisia	TUN	Tunisian Olympic Committee	1957	
United Arab Emirates	UAE	United Arab Emirates National Olympic Committee	1979/1980	
Yemen	YEM	Yemen Olympic Committee	1971/1981	

== Events ==
- Arab Games
- Arab Championships

== See also ==
- African Games
- Asian Games
