= 1961 Arab Games =

Multi-sport event

- Host city: Casablanca
- Country: Morocco
- Opening: 24 August 1961
- Closing: 8 September 1961

The 3rd Arab Games were held in Casablanca, Morocco between 24 August and 8 September 1961. 1,127 athletes from 9 countries participated in events across 11 sports.

== Sports ==
- Athletics
- Basketball
- Boxing
- Football
- Gymnastics (artistic)
- Handball
- Swimming
- Tennis
- Water polo
- Weightlifting
- Wrestling

== Medal table ==
| Rank | Nation | Gold | Silver | Bronze | Total |
|---|---|---|---|---|---|
| 1 | United Arab Republic (UAR) | 53 | 38 | 18 | 109 |
| 2 | Morocco (MAR) | 23 | 20 | 30 | 73 |
| 3 | Lebanon (LIB) | 7 | 19 | 17 | 43 |
| 4 | Libya (LBA) | 2 | 4 | 6 | 12 |
| 5 | Palestine (PLE) | 1 | 0 | 7 | 8 |
| 6 | Sudan (SUD) | 0 | 1 | 3 | 4 |
| 7 | Jordan (JOR) | 0 | 1 | 2 | 3 |
| 8 | Kuwait (KWT) | 0 | 0 | 0 | 0 |
| 8 | Oman (OMA) | 0 | 0 | 0 | 0 |
| 8 | Saudi Arabia (KSA) | 0 | 0 | 0 | 0 |
| Totals (10 entries) | | 86 | 83 | 83 | 252 |
