= 1992 Arab Games =

Quadrennial multi-sport event between Arab nations

- Host city: Damascus
- Country: Syria
- Opening: 4 September 1992
- Closing: 18 September 1992

The 1992 Arab Games were the seventh edition of the quadrennial multi-sport event for Arab nations. They were held in Damascus, Syria between September 4 and 18, 1992. A total of 2611 athletes from 18 countries participated in events in 14 sports.

The event was greatly affected by the 1991 Gulf War, and several athletes refused to participate in the games. Iraq and Libya did not take part in the games.

The football tournament was also considered a part of the Arab Nations Cup.

== Sports ==
- Archery ()
- Artistic gymnastics ()
- Athletics ()
- Basketball ()
- Boxing ()
- Cycling ()
- Equestrian ()
- Football ()
- Handball ()
- Karate ()
- Swimming ()
- Volleyball ()
- Weightlifting ()
- Wrestling ()

== Medal table ==
* Host nation (Syria)

Rank	Nation	Gold	Silver	Bronze	Total
1	Syria (SYR)*	48	30	36	114
2	Egypt (EGY)	36	30	30	96
3	Algeria (ALG)	27	21	24	72
4	Morocco (MAR)	15	7	6	28
5	Kuwait (KUW)	8	6	16	30
6	Qatar (QAT)	8	3	4	15
7	Saudi Arabia (SAU)	5	12	5	22
8	Tunisia (TUN)	3	22	26	51
9	Jordan (JOR)	1	6	6	13
10	United Arab Emirates (UAE)	1	3	1	5
11	Palestine (PLE)	1	2	6	9
12	Lebanon (LBN)	1	1	10	12
13	Bahrain (BHR)	1	0	1	2
14	Yemen (YEM)	0	2	0	2
15	Oman (OMN)	0	0	2	2
16	Djibouti (DJI)	0	0	1	1
16	Sudan (SUD)	0	0	1	1
18	Mauritania (MTN)	0	0	0	0
Totals (18 entries)		155	145	175	475
