= 1957 Arab Games =

Multi-sport event

- Host city: Beirut
- Country: Lebanon
- Opening: 12 October 1957
- Closing: 28 October 1957

The 2nd Arab Games were held in Beirut, Lebanon between October 12 and October 28, 1957. 914 athletes from 10 countries participated in events in 12 sports.

== Sports ==
- Archery ()
- Artistic gymnastics ()
- Athletics ()
- Basketball ()
- Boxing ()
- Cycling ()
- Equestrian ()
- Fencing ()
- Football ()
- Rowing ()
- Swimming ()
- Volleyball ()
- Weightlifting ()
- Wrestling ()

== Medals won by country ==
Rank	Nation	Gold	Silver	Bronze	Total
1	Lebanon (LIB)	29	38	19	86
2	Tunisia (TUN)	20	8	17	45
3	Iraq (IRQ)	15	13	7	35
4	Morocco (MAR)	9	10	6	25
5	Syria (SYR)	7	9	10	26
6	Jordan (JOR)	3	4	3	10
7	Kuwait (KUW)	0	0	1	1
7	Libya (LBA)	0	0	1	1
9	Saudi Arabia (SAU)	0	0	0	0
Totals (9 entries)		83	82	64	229
