= 1976 Arab Games =

Multi-sport event

- Host city: Damascus
- Country: Syria
- Opening: 6 October 1976
- Closing: 21 October 1976

The 5th Arab Games were held in Damascus, Syria from 6 to 21 October 1976. A total of 2,174 athletes from 11 countries participated in events in 18 sports.

== Sports ==
- Athletics
- Basketball
- Boxing
- Road bicycle racing
- Equestrian
- Football
- Artistic gymnastics
- Weightlifting
- Handball
- Judo
- Karate
- Wrestling
- Swimming
- Tennis
- Table tennis
- Archery
- Volleyball
- Water polo

== Medal table ==
Rank	Nation	Gold	Silver	Bronze	Total
1	Syria (SYR)	72	40	23	135
2	Morocco (MAR)	29	19	11	59
3	Sudan (SUD)	12	10	7	29
4	Kuwait (KWT)	4	5	13	22
5	Saudi Arabia (SAU)	3	6	19	28
6	Jordan (JOR)	2	25	7	34
7	Palestine (PSE)	1	6	14	21
8	Bahrain (BHN)	0	0	13	13
9	South Yemen (YMD)	0	0	1	1
10	Brunei (BRN)	0	0	0	0
10	Mauritania (MTN)	0	0	0	0
10	United Arab Emirates (ARE)	0	0	0	0
Totals (12 entries)		123	111	108	342
