= 2004 Arab Games =

International multi-sport event

10th Arab Games
- Host city: Algiers, Algeria
- Nations: 22
- Athletes: 3,240
- Events: 26 sports
- Opening: 24 September 2004
- Closing: 10 October 2004
- Opened by: Abdelaziz Bouteflika
- Main venue: Stade 5 Juillet 1962
- Website: Archived website (in Arabic)

The 10th Arab Games was an international multi-sport event which took place in Algiers, Algeria, from 24 September to 10 October 2004. It witnessed the participation of all Arab League members for the first time – 22 countries participated in 26 sports.

The event was originally scheduled for 2003, but was postponed for a year due to the damage caused by the 2003 Boumerdès earthquake.

== Sports ==
The sports programme incorporated 23 sports for elite athletes and three disability sports. Further to this, cultural and scientific events were included on the schedule for the 2004 Games.

- Athletics
- Badminton
- Basketball
- Beach volleyball
- Boxing
- Chess
- Cycling
- Equestrian
- Fencing
- Gymnastics
- Judo
- Karate
- Kickboxing
- Rowing
- Sailing
- Shooting
- Swimming
- Table tennis
- Taekwondo
- Tennis
- Volleyball
- Weightlifting
- Wrestling

=== Disability sports ===
- Athletics
- Basketball
- Goalball

== Medal table ==
* Host nation (Algeria)

Rank	Nation	Gold	Silver	Bronze	Total
1	Algeria (ALG)*	91	89	87	267
2	Egypt (EGY)	81	52	49	182
3	Tunisia (TUN)	46	39	47	132
4	Syria (SYR)	24	30	36	90
5	Morocco (MAR)	21	38	41	100
6	Saudi Arabia (SAU)	16	20	18	54
7	Iraq (IRQ)	13	24	34	71
8	Jordan (JOR)	11	19	31	61
9	Libya (LBA)	5	2	3	10
10	United Arab Emirates (UAE)	4	5	10	19
11	Kuwait (KUW)	3	6	18	27
12	Qatar (QAT)	3	5	18	26
13	Lebanon (LBN)	3	3	5	11
14	Yemen (YEM)	3	1	4	8
15	Sudan (SUD)	2	6	3	11
16	Bahrain (BHR)	2	1	3	6
17	Palestine (PLE)	0	1	1	2
18	Oman (OMN)	0	1	0	1
Totals (18 entries)		328	342	408	1,078

== Participation ==
22 countries were represented in the competition – constituting all the members of the Arab League at the time.

- Algeria
- Bahrain
- Comoros
- Djibouti
- Egypt
- Iraq
- Jordan
- Kuwait
- Lebanon
- Libya
- Mauritania
- Morocco
- Oman
- Palestine
- Qatar
- Saudi Arabia
- Somalia
- Sudan
- Syria
- Tunisia
- United Arab Emirates
- Yemen
