= 1953 Arab Games =

Multi-sport event

- Host city: Alexandria
- Country: Egypt
- Opening: 26 July 1953
- Closing: 10 August 1953

The 1st Arab Games were held in Alexandria, Egypt, between 26 July and 10 August 1953. A total number of 650 athletes from 9 countries, 8 Arab countries and Indonesia (invited) participated in events in 10 sports.

== Sports ==
- Archery ()
- Artistic gymnastics ()
- Athletics ()
- Basketball ()
- Boxing ()
- Fencing ()
- Football ()
- Swimming ()
- Weightlifting ()
- Wrestling ()

== Medal table ==
Rank	Nation	Gold	Silver	Bronze	Total
1	Egypt (EGY)	75	36	25	136
2	Lebanon (LBN)	3	16	15	34
3	Palestine (PSE)	1	5	6	12
4	Syria (SYR)	0	15	16	31
5	Iraq (IRQ)	0	5	6	11
6	Indonesia (IDN)	0	2	0	2
7	Jordan (JOR)	0	0	2	2
8	Libya (LBA)	0	0	1	1
9	Kuwait (KWT)	0	0	0	0
Totals (9 entries)		79	79	71	229
