= 1985 Arab Games =

Multi-sport event

- Host city: Rabat
- Country: Morocco
- Opening: 8 August 1985
- Closing: 16 August 1985

The 6th Arab Games were held in Casablanca, Morocco from 8 to 16 August 1985. A total of 3,442 athletes from 17 countries participated in events in 18 sports.

The 1985 games were the first to allow women to compete.

== Sports ==
- Artistic gymnastics ()
- Athletics ()
- Basketball ()
- Boxing ()
- Cycling ()
- Equestrian ()
- Football ()
- Golf ()
- Handball ()
- Judo ()
- Sailing ()
- Swimming ()
- Table tennis ()
- Tennis ()
- Volleyball ()
- Water polo ()
- Tennis ()
- Weightlifting ()
- Wrestling ()

== Medal table ==
Rank	Nation	Gold	Silver	Bronze	Total
1	Morocco (MAR)	57	28	32	117
2	Tunisia (TUN)	41	25	25	91
3	Iraq (IRQ)	20	20	16	56
4	Algeria (ALG)	15	40	42	97
5	Syria (SYR)	9	14	31	54
6	Libya (LBA)	6	15	1	22
7	Bahrain (BHR)	4	1	0	5
8	Lebanon (LBN)	2	2	3	7
9	Qatar (QAT)	2	2	2	6
10	Sudan (SUD)	1	1	0	2
11	Saudi Arabia (SAU)	1	0	8	9
12	North Yemen (YAR)	1	0	1	2
13	Jordan (JOR)	1	0	0	1
14	Somalia (SOM)	0	4	1	5
15	Kuwait (KUW)	0	3	16	19
16	Palestine (PLE)	0	1	3	4
17	Djibouti (DJI)	0	1	0	1
18	Brunei (BRN)	0	0	1	1
19	Chad (CHA)	0	0	0	0
19	Egypt (EGY)	0	0	0	0
19	Eritrea (ERI)	0	0	0	0
19	South Sudan (SSD)	0	0	0	0
19	Yemen (YEM)	0	0	0	0
Totals (23 entries)		160	157	182	499
