= 2011 Arab Games =

International multi-sport event

XII Arab Games
- Host city: Doha, Qatar
- Nations: 21
- Athletes: 8,000 (est.)
- Events: 318 in 27 sports
- Opening: December 9
- Closing: December 23
- Opened by: Hamad bin Khalifa Al Thani
- Main venue: Khalifa International Stadium

Location of the host city of the games in Qatar.

The 2011 Arab Games also known as the 12th Arab Games took place in Doha, Qatar from 6 to 23 December 2011. This was the first time that the country had hosted the multi-sport event. Khalifa International Stadium was the main venue for the competition.

== Preparation ==
=== Host selection ===
Qatar was awarded rights to organise the games beating Lebanon in the bidding process. Arab Federation for Sports secretary-general Othman Al-Saad said that Qatar's hosting of the Pan-Arab Games would give the event "more momentum and significance in light of the huge capabilities and world-class sports facilities which Qatar owns."

Khalifa International Stadium was chosen to be the focal point of the games, hosting the opening ceremonies, while the closing ceremonies were held on Jassim bin Hamad Stadium.

=== Transport ===
Public Transport for the event was provided by Mowasalat in the form of Buses, Taxis and Limousines. The opening and closing ceremonies were allocated 100 buses for the respective days. There were on average approximately 230 buses dedicated to the games to transport Athletes, Games Staff, Coaching Staff, Media, and Sports Officials to and from The Airport, Hotels, Athlete's Village, Sports Venues, Practice Venues, and the Media Centre. The services were planned & scheduled by Mowasalat’s Mass Transit Planning Manager Mr Sheldon Cowie (Now - The Roster Shed) who also managed the event transport operationally with TMS (Transport Management Services)

=== Mascot and medals ===
Wathnan, a white Arabian horse was designed as the mascot for the Games. An prominent animal in Arabian culture, the horse is a symbol of great strength and agility. Pearl and emerald studded Bronze, Silver, and Gold medals were awarded to winning athletes, accompanied by mascot stuffed toy. The medals were measured 70 mm in diameter and 6 mm in thickness with base made out of pewter.

== Venues ==
Venue	Events	Capacity	Ref.
ASPIRE Academy for Sports Excellence	Athletics, opening and closing ceremonies (Khalifa International Stadium)	50, 000	
ASPIRE Academy for Sports Excellence	Swimming (Hamad Aquatic Centre)	2,000	
ASPIRE Academy for Sports Excellence	Chess (Ladies zone)		
ASPIRE Academy for Sports Excellence	Handball (Women's Indoor hall)		
ASPIRE Academy for Sports Excellence	Gymnastics (Dome C2)		
ASPIRE Academy for Sports Excellence	Fencing, Table tennis (Dome C3)		
ASPIRE Academy for Sports Excellence	Wrestling (Dome C4)		
ASPIRE Academy for Sports Excellence	Boxing (Dome C5)		
Lusail Cycling course	Cycling (Road)		
Lusail Shooting Complex	Archery, Shooting		
Al-Gharafa Sports Club	Football (Stadium)	25,000	
Al-Gharafa Sports Club	Beach volleyball (BV Arena)		
Al-Gharafa Sports Club	Basketball (Indoor hall)		
Al-Dana Club	Bodybuilding, Weightlifting		
Qatar Equestrian Federation	Equestrian (Dressage, Jumping)		
Al-Sadd Sports Club	Football (Stadium)	15,000	
Al-Sadd Sports Club	Goalball (demonstration) (Indoor hall)		
Al-Rayyan Sports Club	Football (Stadium)	21,282	
Al-Rayyan Sports Club	Volleyball (Indoor hall)		
Mesaieed Endurance Course	Equestrian (Endurance)		
Doha Golf Club	Golf		
Doha Sailing Club	Sailing		
Qatar Bowling Centre	Bowling		
Qatar Billiards and Snooker Federation	Cue Sports		
Qatar Sports Club	Judo, Karate, Taekwondo (Indoor hall)		
Khalifa International Tennis and Squash Complex	Squash, Tennis		

== Sports ==
- Archery (19)
- Athletics (45)
- Basketball (2)
- Bodybuilding (7)
- Bowling (6)
- Boxing (10)
- Chess (6)
- Cue sports (5)
- Cycling (7)
- Equestrian (6)
- Fencing (12)
- Football (1)
- Golf (4)
- Gymnastics (15)
- Handball (2)
- Judo (16)
- Karate (16)
- Sailing (6)
- Shooting (36)
- Squash (2)
- Swimming (38)
- Table tennis (6)
- Taekwondo (16)
- Tennis (6)
- Volleyball (3)
- Weightlifting (12)
- Wrestling (14)

=== Demonstration sports ===
- Athletics (30) ()
- Goalball (1) ()

== Participating National Olympic Committees ==
Initially, all twenty-two nations of the Union of Arab National Olympic Committees were scheduled to compete at the games. However, Syria withdrew its team in November 2011 in protest of the Arab League's suspension of the country's membership.

- Algeria (223)
- Bahrain (171)
- Comoros (21)
- Djibouti (38)
- Egypt (349)
- Iraq (436) (Top Nation)
- Jordan (240)
- Kuwait (260)
- Lebanon (99)
- Libya (148)
- Mauritania (43)
- Morocco (253)
- Oman (94)
- Palestine (109)
- Qatar (370) (Host)
- Saudi Arabia (232)
- Somalia (22)
- Sudan (191)
- Syria (withdrew)
- Tunisia (218)
- United Arab Emirates (144)
- Yemen (46)
- BRN (38)
- CHA (37)
- SSD (32)
- ERI (29)

== Medal table ==
* Host nation (Qatar)

Rank	Nation	Gold	Silver	Bronze	Total
1	Egypt (EGY)	90	76	67	233
2	Tunisia (TUN)	54	45	39	138
3	Morocco (MAR)	37	22	54	113
4	Qatar (QAT)*	30	38	40	108
5	Algeria (ALG)	16	31	41	88
6	Saudi Arabia (KSA)	15	12	19	46
7	Kuwait (KUW)	14	18	31	63
8	Bahrain (BHR)	12	12	14	38
9	Jordan (JOR)	11	14	23	48
10	Iraq (IRQ)	11	13	34	58
11	United Arab Emirates (UAE)	10	9	16	35
12	Lebanon (LIB)	8	5	16	29
13	Oman (OMA)	4	7	10	21
14	Yemen (YEM)	2	2	3	7
15	Palestine (PLE)	1	2	5	8
16	Libya (LBY)	1	1	7	9
17	Djibouti (DJI)	1	1	1	3
18	Sudan (SUD)	0	7	7	14
19	Brunei (BRN)	0	0	0	0
19	Chad (CHA)	0	0	0	0
19	Comoros (COM)	0	0	0	0
19	Eritrea (ERI)	0	0	0	0
19	Mauritania (MTN)	0	0	0	0
19	Somalia (SOM)	0	0	0	0
19	South Sudan (SSD)	0	0	0	0
Totals (25 entries)		317	315	427	1,059

== Paralympic Medal Standings ==
Medals in 30 Para Athletics and 1 Goalball events were awarded to athletes from respective participating nations. However, as demonstration events, they were not counted into the official medal table.

* Host nation (Qatar)

Rank	Nation	Gold	Silver	Bronze	Total
1	Tunisia (TUN)	9	8	3	20
2	Iraq (IRQ)	5	3	6	14
3	Algeria (ALG)	4	6	2	12
4	Egypt (EGY)	4	4	0	8
5	Morocco (MAR)	3	3	1	7
6	United Arab Emirates (UAE)	2	0	6	8
7	Libya (LBY)	1	3	2	6
8	Saudi Arabia (KSA)	1	3	1	5
9	Palestine (PLE)	1	1	4	6
10	Jordan (JOR)	1	0	3	4
11	Qatar (QAT)*	0	0	2	2
Totals (11 entries)		31	31	30	92

== See also ==
- 2006 Asian Games
- 2019 World Beach Games
- 2022 FIFA World Cup
