= 1997 Arab Games =

International multi-sport event

- Host city: Beirut
- Country: Lebanon
- Opening: 12 July 1997
- Closing: 27 July 1997

The 8th Arab Games were held in Beirut, Lebanon between July 12 and 27, 1997. 3,253 athletes from 18 countries participated in events in 22 sports.

Over 50,000 people gathered in the Sports City in Beirut for the opening ceremony of the eighth Pan-Arab games, the first such event to be hosted by Lebanon for 40 years.

== Individual sports ==
=== Equestrian ===
Ramzy Al Duhami won the gold medal in the individual event.

=== Football ===
The football tournament was won by Jordan, defeating Syria 1–0 in the final.

== Sports ==
- Archery (results)
- Athletics (results)
- Basketball (results)
- Boxing (results)
- Cycling (results)
- Equestrian (results)
- Fencing (results)
- Football (results)
- Golf (results)
- Gymnastics (results)
- Judo (results)
- Karate (results)
- Sailing (results)
- Swimming (results)
- Table tennis (results)
- Taekwondo (results)
- Tennis (results)
- Volleyball (results)
- Weightlifting (results)
- Wrestling (results)

== Medal table ==
Rank	Nation	Gold	Silver	Bronze	Total
1	Egypt (EGY)	93	56	38	187
2	Algeria (ALG)	43	46	43	132
3	Syria (SYR)	18	29	34	81
4	Morocco (MAR)	18	15	16	49
5	Jordan (JOR)	10	8	23	41
6	Lebanon (LBN)	9	15	52	76
7	Tunisia (TUN)	9	12	26	47
8	Qatar (QAT)	9	6	2	17
9	Saudi Arabia (SAU)	6	12	21	39
10	Kuwait (KUW)	1	13	23	37
11	Oman (OMN)	1	1	1	3
12	Sudan (SUD)	0	1	3	4
13	Libya (LBA)	0	1	2	3
14	United Arab Emirates (UAE)	0	1	1	2
15	Yemen (YEM)	0	1	0	1
16	Palestine (PLE)	0	0	5	5
17	Bahrain (BHR)	0	0	1	1
18	Mauritania (MTN)	0	0	0	0
Totals (18 entries)		217	217	291	725
