= 1965 Arab Games =

Regional multi-sport event

- Host city: Cairo
- Country: Egypt
- Opening: 2 September 1965
- Closing: 14 September 1965

The 4th Arab Games, a regional multi-sport event held in Arab countries, were held in Cairo, Egypt between September 2 and September 14, 1965. A total number of 1500 athletes from 14 countries participated in events in 12 sports.

== Medal table ==
Rank	Nation	Gold	Silver	Bronze	Total
1	United Arab Republic (UAR)	71	38	31	140
2	Iraq	10	21	11	42
3	Morocco (MAR)	9	2	2	13
4	Lebanon (LIB)	2	10	16	28
5	Syria (SYR)	1	7	19	27
6	Sudan (SUD)	1	6	3	10
7	Libya (LBA)	0	6	8	14
8	Algeria (ALG)	0	3	2	5
9	Indonesia (INA)	0	1	2	3
9	Palestine (PLE)	0	1	2	3
11	Jordan (JOR)	0	0	3	3
12	Aden (Aden)	0	0	0	0
12	Kuwait (KWT)	0	0	0	0
12	Lahej (Lahej)	0	0	0	0
12	Oman (OMA)	0	0	0	0
12	Yemen (YEM)	0	0	0	0
Totals (16 entries)		94	95	99	288
