= 2007 Arab Games =

International multi-sport event

11th Arab Games
- Host city: Cairo, Egypt
- Motto: Uniting Arab Brotherhood
- Nations: 22
- Athletes: 6,000
- Events: 32 sports
- Opening: 11 November 2007
- Closing: 26 November 2007
- Opened by: Hosni Mubarak
- Main venue: Cairo International Stadium
- Website: www.egypt2007.com.eg/ar/Pages/default.aspx

The 11th Arab Games took place in Cairo, Egypt from 11 – 26 November 2007. A total of 22 countries participated in 32 events. These games were the largest in the games' history; seven new events were introduced and 2000 more athletes participated than in previous years, making them 8000 Arab athletes. It was also the first time that some of the Arab football federations participated with their first teams.

== Games ==
=== Opening ceremony ===
The opening ceremony started with the Egyptian singer Tamer Hosny singing a new song for Arab unity, and then the entrance of several Arab leaders with Hosni Mubarak, including Sudanese President Omar Hassan al-Bashir, Palestinian President Mahmoud Abbas, Yemeni President Ali Abdullah Saleh, Iraqi President Jalal Talabani, and the Saudi Crown Prince Sultan bin Abdul Aziz. This was followed by the entrance of the 22 participating teams. The opening word was given to several Arab Sport Federation Chiefs, and the Secretary general of the Arab League, Amr Moussa, and ended with Egyptian President Mubarak's opening words.

The ceremony was divided into eight parts; it started with the Narration of the Abraham's Trip in the desert, and the founding of the Kaaba, thus Mecca, and Arab Unity under Islam, and stressed on the power of Words in the Quran, and then it showed several dances showing the Arab Literature and Arts, then showed performances explaining the Arab's leadership in philosophy, mathematics, astronomy, medicine, gardening and music. Throughout the performance, several Arab scientists, poets, philosophers, mathematicians and travellers were mentioned as well as several verses of the Quran, and how it helped Arabs to achieve such glorious achievements. The ceremony was wrapped up with the Egyptian national anthem then an Arab song called "Amgad Ya Arab" (Glories o Arabs).

=== Sports ===
- Archery
- Athletics
- Badminton
- Basketball
- Bowling
- Boxing
- Camel riding
- Chess
- Cycling
- Equestrian
- Fencing
- Football
- Gymnastics
- Handball
- Judo
- Karate
- Modern pentathlon
- Rowing
- Sailing
- Shooting
- Squash
- Swimming
- Table tennis
- Taekwondo
- Tennis
- Volleyball
- Water polo
- Weightlifting
- Wrestling

=== Disability sports ===
- Athletics
- Table tennis
- Volleyball
- Weightlifting

== Medal table ==
* Host nation (Egypt)

Rank	Nation	Gold	Silver	Bronze	Total
1	Egypt (EGY)*	148	100	89	337
2	Tunisia (TUN)	63	33	49	145
3	Algeria (DZA)	30	43	51	124
4	Morocco (MAR)	21	32	36	89
5	Syria (SYR)	15	23	45	83
6	Qatar (QAT)	14	13	13	40
7	Saudi Arabia (SAU)	8	19	18	45
8	Kuwait (KWT)	8	10	21	39
9	Sudan (SDN)	8	9	8	25
10	Jordan (JOR)	6	14	29	49
11	Libya (LBA)	6	10	14	30
12	United Arab Emirates (ARE)	6	9	8	23
13	Bahrain (BHR)	6	5	10	21
14	Lebanon (LBN)	6	5	9	20
15	Oman (OMN)	5	1	2	8
16	Iraq (IRQ)	4	23	33	60
17	Yemen (YEM)	1	4	7	12
18	Palestine (PSE)	0	0	3	3
19	Comoros (COM)	0	0	0	0
19	Djibouti (DJI)	0	0	0	0
19	Mauritania (MRT)	0	0	0	0
19	Somalia (SOM)	0	0	0	0
Totals (22 entries)		355	353	445	1,153

== Participation ==
By Alphabetical Order

Country	Players	Games
Algeria	443	23
Bahrain	236	14
Comoros	63	9
Djibouti	15	3
Egypt	1,268	32
Iraq	482	28
Jordan	383	28
Kuwait	412	26
Lebanon	153	20
Libya	338	19
Mauritania	17	4
Morocco	230	27
Oman	53	8
Palestine	56	4
Qatar	406	26
Saudi Arabia	472	25
Somalia	13	3
Sudan	142	14
Syria	273	19
Tunisia	329	18
United Arab Emirates	293	17
Yemen	140	14

== Mascot ==
The official mascot of Games is Bastet, whose name was derived from the ancient Egyptian goddess Bast. The mascot Bastet is a black cat, with a headscarf in the ancient Egyptian style, striped with Egypt's flag.
