= 1999 Arab Games =

Multi-sport event

9th Arab Games
- Host city: Amman, Jordan
- Nations: 21
- Athletes: 4600 (est.)
- Events: 29 sports
- Opening: 15 August 1999
- Closing: 31 August 1999
- Main venue: Amman International Stadium

The 1999 Arab Games were the ninth edition of the multi-sport event for Arab countries and were held from August 15 to 31. Around 4600 athletes from 21 countries participated in the 29 sports on offer. The opening ceremony that took place in Al Hussein Youth City Stadium was officially opened by King Abdullah II.

Initially set to be held in Amman in 2001, the games were brought forward by two years and branded as the "Al Hussein tournament" in honour of Hussein of Jordan, the long-ruling monarch who died earlier that year. His daughter, Princess Haya bint Al Hussein, took part in the equestrian competition.

== Games ==
Kuwait refused to send athletes to the event on the grounds that Iraq was participating – part of ongoing poor relations between the countries following the Invasion of Kuwait nine years earlier. It did, however, maintain a presence at the opening ceremony. The Jordanian minister for Youth and Sport, Mohamed Kheir Mamsar, had placed particular emphasis on an attempt to bring together all 22 Arab countries at the games. His failure to do so resulted in his resignation. Those present at the games also caused unrest: the Libyan football team fought with the Palestinian players in the locker room after their match, and fan rioting at the semi-final between Libya and Iraq saw dozen hospitalised. Some home spectators were disruptive at the basketball match between Jordan and Syria, and the throwing of water bottles onto the court only ceased after Princess Haya directly addressed the crowd.

On top of Mamsar's resignation, Ahmed Al-Fahad Al-Ahmed Al-Sabah, the head of the Kuwait Olympic Committee, announced he would quit his position within the Arab Sports Confederation, stating that the Arab League had interfered with his efforts to promote sport within the region. The confederation suffered another casualty at the games as on August 18 Saudi Arabia's Faisal bin Fahd, the president of the grouping, died of a heart attack shortly after attending the proceedings. Many social events around the closing ceremony were cancelled in respect for the late Saudi.

Two of the sports were held and concluded before the opening ceremony: the athletics and basketball competitions were held early to allow the athletes to prepare and attend the 1999 World Championships in Athletics and the 1999 Asian Basketball Confederation Championship, respectively, which clashed with the dates for the Arab Games that year.

There were several doping incidents at the games. Morocco's Siham Hanifi, winner of the women's 100 metres, 200 metres and 4×100 metres relay events, was disqualified after a positive test for nandrolone (a steroid) – a fate also shared by her teammate Karima Shaheen, the discus throw bronze medallist. The bodybuilding contests were severely affected, with a six contestants being removed for taking banned substances.

The Qatari weightlifting team was entirely disqualified after rival nations protested that a number of their representatives were from Bulgaria, Lebanon and Pakistan and did not have sufficient Qatari citizenship to compete. American-based Laila Sarkis-Khoury faced similar protestations but her gold medal in artistic gymnastics stood as she produced proof of Lebanese citizenship. Two Lebanese weightlifters, Youssef Zein and Mahmoud Shuqair, were stripped of their silver and bronze medals from the +90 kg category after positive drug tests. Asaad Jaafar of Iraq, Ahmed Abdel-Salam of Egypt, Bilal Abu Raguh of Jordan and Zahi Ammar of Algeria were also banned.

Iraq did not compete in the equestrian events after its horses were refused passage into Jordan due to their failure to meet international health requirements (the hosts offered replacement animals, but the Iraqi team refused).

Three of Egypt's squash team were injured after their bus overturned during a tour of Madaba. Nesreen Nasha't, Iman Amir and Umniya Abdul Qawi were flown back to Cairo to receive treatment. The Jordanian driver of the vehicle was killed during the accident.

The Sinai rosefinch was chosen as the games' mascot.

The football tournament was won by Jordan, defeating Iraq in the final on penalties after a 4-4 draw.

The 9th Arab Games saw the launch of the first official games website, allowing people follow the events over the internet. Since 1999, each games has had its own official games website.

== Sports ==
- Athletics
- Badminton
- Basketball
- Bodybuilding
- Boxing
- Bridge
- Chess
- Cycling
- Football
- Equestrian
- Fencing
- Fin swimming
- Gymnastics
- Handball
- Judo
- Karate
- Kickboxing
- Shooting
- Squash
- Swimming
- Surfing
- Table tennis
- Taekwondo
- Tennis
- Volleyball
- Weightlifting
- Wrestling (freestyle and Greco-Roman)

== Medal table ==
Rank	Nation	Gold	Silver	Bronze	Total
1	Egypt (EGY)	106	80	81	267
2	Tunisia (TUN)	39	40	62	141
3	Syria (SYR)	34	38	64	136
4	Algeria (ALG)	33	32	31	96
5	Morocco (MAR)	30	42	41	113
6	Jordan (JOR)	26	33	70	129
7	Saudi Arabia (KSA)	15	16	18	49
8	Qatar (QAT)	11	11	22	44
9	United Arab Emirates (UAE)	8	9	17	34
10	Iraq (IRQ)	8	7	32	47
11	Lebanon (LBN)	7	9	25	41
12	Oman (OMN)	4	5	7	16
13	Bahrain (BHR)	1	1	4	6
14	Yemen (YEM)	1	0	5	6
15	Libya (LBA)	0	1	13	14
16	Palestine (PLE)	0	1	10	11
17	Comoros (COM)	0	0	1	1
17	Djibouti (DJI)	0	0	1	1
17	Mauritania (MTN)	0	0	1	1
17	Somalia (SOM)	0	0	1	1
17	Sudan (SUD)	0	0	1	1
Totals (21 entries)		323	325	507	1,155
