= Arab Games =

Sporting event

- Abbreviation: AG
- Inaugurated: 26 July – 10 August 1953, Alexandria, Egypt
- Most recent: 5–15 July 2023, (Algiers, Oran, Constantine, Annaba, Tipaza), Algeria
- Organization: Union of Arab National Olympic Committees

The Arab Games (Arabic: الألعاب العربية), also known as the Pan-Arab Games, are a regional multi-sport event held between nations from the Arab world. They are organized by the Union of Arab National Olympic Committees. The first Games took place in 1953 in Alexandria, Egypt. Intended to be held every four years since, political turmoil and financial difficulties have made the event an unstable one. Women first competed in 1985.

== Complications ==
Typically the games are to take place every four years. Initially Lebanon was set to host the 2015 XIII Arab Games, but the country "withdrew because of the crisis in the Middle East". Following Beirut's withdrawal Morocco was then chosen to host the games, but faced financial complications and also withdrew.

The same year, Egypt volunteered to host the event. "Sheikh Khalid Al Zubair, chairman of the Oman Olympic Committee (OOC)" said, "We will be offering our full support to Egypt and we have also taken a decision to suspend the financial regulations and other requirements due to lack of time." Had the UANOC accepted Egypt's proposition the games would have taken place in December 2015; however, no such event was held.

== Editions ==
Host cities of the Arab Games
5 cities (Algiers, Oran, Constantine, Annaba, Tipaza)

Games	Year	Host	Opened by	Dates	Nations	Competitors			Sports	Events	Top nation
Games	Year	Host	Opened by	Dates	Nations	Men	Women	Total	Sports	Events	Top nation
1	1953	(Egypt) Alexandria	Mohamed Naguib	26 July – 10 August	9	650	—	650	10	70	Egypt
2	1957	(Lebanon) Beirut	Camille Chamoun	13 – 27 October	10	914	—	914	12	90	Lebanon
3	1961	(Morocco) Casablanca	Hassan II	24 August – 8 September	9	1127	—	1127	11	90	United Arab Republic*
4	1965	(United Arab Republic) Cairo**	Gamal Abdel Nasser	2 – 14 September	14	1500	—	1500	13	90	United Arab Republic**
5	1976	(Syria) Damascus	Hafez al-Assad	6 – 21 October	11	2174	—	2174	18	120	Syria
6	1985	(Morocco) Rabat	Hassan II	24 August – 8 September	17			3442	18	160	Morocco
7	1992	(Syria) Damascus	Hafez al-Assad	4 – 18 September	18			2611	14	150	Syria
8	1997	(Lebanon) Beirut	Elias Hrawi	13 – 27 July	18			3253	22	217	Egypt
9	1999	(Jordan) Amman	Abdullah II	15 – 31 August	21			5504	26	323	Egypt
10	2004	(Algeria) Algiers	Abdelaziz Bouteflika	24 September – 10 October	22			5525	32	330	Algeria
11	2007	(Egypt) Cairo	Hosni Mubarak	11 – 26 November	22			6000	32	355	Egypt
12	2011	(Qatar) Doha	Hamad bin Khalifa Al Thani	9 – 23 December	21			6000	33	316	Egypt
13	2023	Algeria (5 cities)	Aymen Benabderrahmane (Prime Minister)	5 – 15 July	22			3800	22	253	Algeria
14	2027	(Saudi Arabia) Riyadh	King of Saudi Arabia (expected)	Future event							
15	2031	Bahrain		Future event							
16	2035	Jordan		Future event							

- * United Arab Republic with Egypt and Syria.
- ** United Arab Republic with Egypt only.
- Not held in 2015 and 2019.
- 2015 Cancelled. (Note: Initially held in Beirut, Lebanon it was cancelled due to security conditions, so the hosting moved to Agadir or Rabat, Morocco, which in turn apologized for hosting and was thus postponed to 2019, and then canceled.)

== Sports ==
37 sports were presented in the Arab Games history. Para Sports since 1999. Women since 1985.

Sport	Years
Athletics ()	since 1953
Archery ()	since 1953
Badminton ()	since 1999
Basketball ()	since 1953
Bodybuilding ()	since 1999
Boxing ()	since 1953
Bowling ()	since 2007
Contract bridge ()	since 1999
Camel racing ()	since 2007
Cue sports ()	since 2011
Chess ()	since 1999
Cycling ()	since 1957
Diving ()	TBA

Sport	Years
Equestrian ()	since 1957
Fencing ()	since 1953
Finswimming ()	since 1999
Football ()	since 1953
Golf ()	since 1985
Gymnastics ()	since 1953
Handball ()	since 1961
Judo ()	since 1976
Karate ()	since 1976
Kickboxing ()	since 1999
Modern pentathlon ()	since 2007
Rowing ()	since 1957

Sport	Years
Sailing ()	since 1985
Shooting ()	since 1953
Squash ()	since 1999
Surfing ()	since 1999
Swimming ()	since 1953
Table tennis ()	since 1976
Taekwondo ()	since 1997
Tennis ()	since 1961
Volleyball ()	since 1957
Water polo ()	since 1961
Weightlifting ()	since 1953
Wrestling ()	since 1953

== All-time medal table ==
Below is the medal table of the Arab Games tournaments, up until the 13th tournament 2023.

Rank	Nation	Gold	Silver	Bronze	Total
1	Egypt (EGY)	641	431	379	1,451
2	Algeria (ALG)	360	381	393	1,134
3	Tunisia (TUN)	298	271	342	911
4	Morocco (MAR)	290	273	300	863
5	Syria (SYR)	242	250	338	830
6	United Arab Republic (UAR)	122	74	49	245
7	Iraq (IRQ)	88	144	194	426
8	Jordan (JOR)	88	140	228	456
9	Qatar (QAT)	86	80	112	278
10	Lebanon (LIB)	77	120	186	383
11	Saudi Arabia (KSA)	76	106	154	336
12	Bahrain (BHR)	44	31	56	131
13	Kuwait (KUW)	40	65	143	248
14	United Arab Emirates (UAE)	34	41	65	140
15	Sudan (SUD)	24	42	37	103
16	Libya (LBA)	23	42	61	126
17	Oman (OMN)	19	18	27	64
18	Palestine (PLE)	8	23	70	101
19	Yemen (YEM)	7	10	21	38
20	Djibouti (DJI)	1	2	1	4
21	Indonesia (INA)	1	1	2	4
22	North Yemen (YAR)	1	0	1	2
23	Somalia (SOM)	0	4	1	5
24	Mauritania (MTN)	0	1	0	1
25	South Yemen (YMD)	0	0	1	1
Totals (25 entries)		2,570	2,550	3,161	8,281

- * The United Arab Republic (1958–1971) contains 2 countries Egypt & Syria.
- * Indonesia won medals at the 1965 Pan Arab Games.

== Related Games ==
=== Arab University Games ===
Editions

- 1970s ? Iraq
- 1998 ? Egypt
- 2004 (Jordan) Amman
- 2010 ? Egypt (Note: AUSF Report Page 9. Also arab university futsal, beach volleyball, basketball and futsal championship. 1338 athletes from 17 nations.)
- 2018 (Morocco) Agadir

=== Arab University Beach Games ===
Editions

- 2016 (Morocco) Agadir

=== Arab Games for the Handicapped ===
Editions

- 1999 (Jordan) Amman
- 2003 (Algeria) Algiers (cancelled)

=== Arab School Games ===
Editions

Organized by the Arab Union for Physical Education and School Sports (AUPESS).

Unofficial

- 1949 (Lebanon) Beirut
- 1951 (Egypt) Cairo
- 1952 (Syria) Damascus
- 1954 (Lebanon) Beirut

Official

- 1963 Kuwait City
- 1964 not held
- 1966 (Syria) Damascus
- 1971 (Iraq) Baghdad
- 1973 (Lebanon) Beirut (women were first allowed to participate)
- 1975 (Egypt) Alexandria
- 1977 (Libya) Tripoli
- 1979 (Somalia) Mogadishu
- 1986 (Tunisia) Tunis
- not held
- not held
- 1998 ? Morocco
- 2000 not held
- 2002 (Lebanon) Beirut
- 2004 ? Saudi Arabia
- 2006 (Algeria) Algiers
- 2008 (Jordan) Amman
- 2010 ? Lebanon
- 2012 Kuwait City

== See also ==
- African Games
- Asian Games
- GCC Games
- All-Africa University Games

== Sources ==
- Bell, Daniel (2003). Encyclopedia of International Games. McFarland and Company, Inc. Publishers, Jefferson, North Carolina. ISBN 0-7864-1026-4.
