= Algeria at the 2023 Arab Games =

- IOC code: ALG
- NOC: Algerian Olympic Committee

in Algeria July 5, 2023 – July 15, 2023
- Competitors: 454 in 22 sports
- Medals Ranked 1st: Gold 105 Silver 76 Bronze 72 Total 253

Arab Games appearances (overview)
- 1965; 1976; 1985; 1992; 1997; 1999; 2004; 2007; 2011; 2023; 2027

Algeria participated in the 13th Arab Games, which were held in Algeria in 5 cities (Algiers, Oran, Constantine, Annaba and Tipaza) from 5 to 15 July 2023. It competed with 454 athletes in 22 sports.

Algeria has previously participated in 8 editions (1965, 1985, 1992, 1997, 1999, 2004, 2007, 2011), and is fourth in the overall standings before the start of this edition.

== Medals ==
=== Medals by sport ===
Algeria ranked first in the overall standings table for the second time in its history after the 2004 edition.

Sport	Gold	Silver	Bronze	Total
Swimming	23	14	14	51
Athletics	14	8	13	35
Wrestling	9	8	2	19
Boxing	9	4	5	18
Judo	8	6	2	16
Boules	8	5	2	15
Gymnastics	6	5	5	16
Cycling	6	2	2	10
Karate	5	3	4	12
Fencing	5	1	3	9
Weightlifting	3	6	3	12
Badminton	3	4	6	13
Sailing	2	4	3	9
Table tennis	2	1	4	7
Basketball 3x3	1	1	0	2
Volleyball	1	1	0	2
Chess	0	3	3	6
Handball	0	0	1	1
Totals (18 entries)	105	76	72	253

=== Medalists ===
==== Swimming ====
Medal	Name	Event	Date
Gold	Redouane Bouali; Youcef Bouzouia; Fares Benzidoun; Jaouad Syoud	Men, 4 x 100m Freestyle	5 July
Gold	Hamida Rania Nefsi	Women, 400m Medley	5 July
Gold	Jaouad Syoud	Men, 100m Butterfly	6 July
Gold	Jaouad Syoud	Men, 200m Medley	6 July
Gold	Amel Melih	Women, 100m Freestyle	6 July
Gold	Jihane Benchadli	Women, 200m Butterfly	6 July
Gold	Hichem Taibi; Jaouad Syoud; Nesrine Medjahed; Amel Melih	Mixed, 4 x 100m Medley	6 July
Gold	Amel Melih	Women, 50m Butterfly	7 July
Gold	Hamida Rania Nefsi	Women, 100m Breaststroke	7 July
Gold	Imene Kawthar Zitouni	Women, 200m Backstroke	7 July
Gold	Jaouad Syoud; Redouane Bouali; Amel Melih; Nesrine Medjahed	Mixed, 4 x 100m Freestyle	7 July
Gold	Amel Melih	Women, 50m Backstroke	8 July
Gold	Jaouad Syoud	Men, 50m Butterfly	8 July
Gold	Hamida Rania Nefsi	Women, 200m Medley	8 July
Gold	Redouane Bouali; Jaouad Syoud; Moncef Aymen Balamane; Fares Benzidoun	Men, 4 x 200m Freestyle	8 July
Gold	Nesrine Medjahed	Women, 100m Butterfly	9 July
Gold	Jaouad Syoud	Men, 400m Medley	9 July
Gold	Amel Melih	Women, 50m Freestyle	9 July
Gold	Jaouad Syoud	Men, 50m Breaststroke	9 July
Gold	Hamida Rania Nefsi	Women, 200m Breaststroke	10 July
Gold	Jaouad Syoud	Men, 200m Butterfly	10 July
Gold	Nesrine Medjahed	Women, 200m Freestyle	10 July
Gold	Moncef Benbara; Jaouad Syoud; Fares Benzidoun; Redouane Bouali	Men, 4 x 100m Medley	10 July
Silver	Moncef Aymen Balamane	Men, 100m Breaststroke	5 July
Silver	Imene Kawthar Zitouni	Women, 400m Medley	5 July
Silver	Moncef Aymen Balamane	Men, 200m Medley	6 July
Silver	Lilia Sihem Midouni	Women, 200m Butterfly	6 July
Silver	Jihane Benchadli	Women, 200m Backstroke	7 July
Silver	Moncef Aymen Balamane	Men, 200m Breaststroke	8 July
Silver	Jihane Benchadli	Women, 200m Medley	8 July
Silver	Imene Kawthar Zitouni	Women, 100m Butterfly	9 July
Silver	Ramzi Chouchar	Men, 400m Medley	9 July
Silver	Nesrine Medjahed	Women, 50m Freestyle	9 July
Silver	Moncef Benbara	Men, 200m Backstroke	10 July
Silver	Fares Benzidoun	Men, 200m Butterfly	10 July
Silver	Majda Chebaraka	Women, 200m Freestyle	10 July
Silver	Ramzi Chouchar	Men, 1500m Freestyle	10 July
Bronze	Hichem Taibi	Men, 100m Backstroke	5 July
Bronze	Imene Kawthar Zitouni	Women, 100m Backstroke	5 July
Bronze	Nesrine Medjahed	Women, 50m Breaststroke	5 July
Bronze	Redouane Bouali	Men, 200m Freestyle	6 July
Bronze	Fares Benzidoun	Men, 100m Butterfly	6 July
Bronze	Nesrine Medjahed	Women, 100m Freestyle	6 July
Bronze	Nesrine Medjahed	Women, 50m Butterfly	7 July
Bronze	Akram Amine Ammar	Men, 50m Backstroke	7 July
Bronze	Youcef Bouzouia	Men, 50m Butterfly	8 July
Bronze	Majda Chebaraka	Women, 400m Freestyle	8 July
Bronze	Ramzi Chouchar	Men, 200m Breaststroke	8 July
Bronze	Redouane Bouali	Men, 100m Freestyle	9 July
Bronze	Moncef Aymen Balamane	Men, 50m Breaststroke	9 July
Bronze	Hichem Taibi	Men, 200m Backstroke	10 July

==== Athletics ====
Medal	Name	Event	Date
Gold	Souad Azzi	10km Race Walk Women	4 July
Gold	Ouidad Yesli	Javelin Throw Women	4 July
Gold	Sohail Abderahmane Aloui	20km Race Walk Men	5 July
Gold	Afaf Ben Hadja	Heptathlon Women	5 July
Gold	Amine Bouanani	110m Hurdles Men	5 July
Gold	Nabila Bounab	Discus Throw Women	5 July
Gold	Hadil Rezik	High Jump Women	5 July
Gold	Hichem Bouchicha	3000m Steeplechase Men	5 July
Gold	Zahra Tatar	Hammer Throw Women	6 July
Gold	Yasser Triki	Triple Jump Men	6 July
Gold	Slimane Moula	800m Men	7 July
Gold	Larbi Bourrada	Decathlon Men	7 July
Gold	Yasser Triki	Long Jump Men	7 July
Gold	Fouad Hamada; Mohamed Ali Gouaned; Djamel Sedjati; Slimane Moula	4 × 400 m Men	7 July
Silver	Abdennour Ameur	20km Race Walk Men	5 July
Silver	Rahil Hamel	100m Hurdles Women	5 July
Silver	Bilal Tabti	3000m Steeplechase Men	5 July
Silver	Zouina Bouzebra	Hammer Throw Women	6 July
Silver	Adem Boualbani	Triple Jump Men	6 July
Silver	Wissal Harkas	Triple Jump Women	7 July
Silver	Abdelmalik Lahoulou	400m Hurdles Men	7 July
Silver	Dhiae Cherif Boudoumi	Decathlon Men	7 July
Bronze	Melissa Touloum	10km Race Walk Women	4 July
Bronze	Hichem Bouhanoune	High Jump Men	4 July
Bronze	Ghania Rezzik	1500m Women	4 July
Bronze	Youcef Addouche	10000m Men	4 July
Bronze	Ouidad Yesli	Heptathlon Women	5 July
Bronze	Oussama Khennoussi	Discus Throw Men	5 July
Bronze	Loubna Benhadja; Manel Benkaci; Kaoutar Selmi; Rahil Hamel	4 × 100 m Women	6 July
Bronze	Mohamed Abdelhakim Guettouche; Adem-Abdelkader Benyache; Idriss Lardj; Skander Djamil Athmani	4 × 100 m Men	6 July
Bronze	Kaoutar Selmi	Triple Jump Women	7 July
Bronze	Saber Boukmouche	400m Hurdles Men	7 July
Bronze	Lyna Benaibouche	Shot Put Women	7 July
Bronze	Salim Keddar	5000m Men	7 July
Bronze	Samira Messad; Chaima Ouanis; Chaima Benali; Djamila Zine	4 × 400 m Women	7 July

==== Wrestling ====
Medal	Name	Event	Date
Gold	Adem Boudjemline	Greco-Roman 97kg	9 July
Gold	Abdeldjebar Djebbari	Greco-Roman 63kg	9 July
Gold	Abdelmalek Merabet	Greco-Roman 72kg	9 July
Gold	Abdelkrim Ouakali	Greco-Roman 82kg	9 July
Gold	Ishak Ghaiou	Greco-Roman 67kg	10 July
Gold	Bachir Sid Azara	Greco-Roman 87kg	10 July
Gold	Abdelhak Kherbache	Freestyle 61kg	11 July
Gold	Chems Eddine Fetairia	Freestyle 79kg	11 July
Gold	Wali Eddine Kebir	Freestyle 92kg	11 July
Silver	Mohamed Yacine Dridi	Greco-Roman 55kg	9 July
Silver	Salah Eddine Kateb	Freestyle 57kg	10 July
Silver	Zohier Iftene	Freestyle 65kg	10 July
Silver	Abdelkader Ikkal	Freestyle 74kg	10 July
Silver	Akrem Boudjemline	Greco-Roman 77kg	10 July
Silver	Abderrahmane Benaissa	Freestyle 70kg	11 July
Silver	Fatah Benferdjallah	Freestyle 86kg	11 July
Silver	Fadi Rouabah	Freestyle 97kg	11 July
Bronze	Hichem Kouchit	Greco-Roman 130kg	9 July
Bronze	Abdelkrim Fergat	Greco-Roman 60kg	10 July

==== Boxing ====
Medal	Name	Event	Date
Gold	Fatiha Mansouri	Women -48kg	11 July
Gold	Roumaysa Boualam	Women -50kg	11 July
Gold	Hadjila Khelif	Women -60kg	11 July
Gold	Zobeida Hayam Fatima Zohra	Women -63kg	11 July
Gold	Imane Khelif	Women -66kg	11 July
Gold	Kamel Khennoussi	Men -48kg	12 July
Gold	Jugurtha Ait Bekka	Men -63,5kg	12 July
Gold	Chemseddine Kramou	Men -67kg	12 July
Gold	Mourad Kadi	Men +92kg	12 July
Silver	Fatima Zohra Abdelkader Hadjala	Women -54kg	11 July
Silver	Djouher Benane	Women -75kg	11 July
Silver	Mohamed Flissi	Men -54kg	12 July
Silver	Ahmed Abderraouf Ghazli	Men -75kg	12 July
Bronze	Souha Miloudi	Women -52kg	11 July
Bronze	Salem Tamma	Men -60kg	12 July
Bronze	Azzouz Boudia	Men -86kg	12 July
Bronze	Youcef Islam Yaiche	Men -71kg	12 July
Bronze	Tarek Taruket	Men -92kg	12 July

==== Judo ====
Medal	Name	Event	Date
Gold	Wail Ezzine	Men's 66 kg	5 July
Gold	Yamina Halata	Women's 57 kg	5 July
Gold	Amina Belkadi	Women's 63 kg	5 July
Gold	Messaoud Dris	Men's 73 kg	5 July
Gold	Mustapha Bouamar	Men's 100 kg	6 July
Gold	Sonia Asselah	Women's +78 kg	6 July
Gold	Mohamed El Mehdi Lili	Men's +100 kg	6 July
Gold	Amina Belkadi; Yamina Halata; Faiza Aissahine; Souad Bellakehal; Sonia Asselah	Women's team	7 July
Silver	Houaria Kaddour	Women's 48 kg	5 July
Silver	Faiza Aissahine	Women's 52 kg	5 July
Silver	Aghiles Imad Benazoug	Men's 81 kg	6 July
Silver	Souad Bellakehal	Women's 70 kg	6 July
Silver	Oussama Kabri	Men's 90 kg	6 July
Silver	Wail Ezzine; Messaoud Redouane Dris; Aghiles Imad Benazoug; Rayane Zakaria Benatia; Mohamed El Mehdi Lili	Men's team	7 July
Bronze	Meroua Mammeri	Women's +78 kg	6 July
Bronze	Redha Lamri	Men's 100 kg	6 July

==== Boules ====
Medal	Name	Event	Date
Gold	Ahmed Triak	Raffa- Men's Individual	9 July
Gold	Besma Boukernafa	Raffa- Women's individual	9 July
Gold	Chahrezad Chibani; Tarek Zekiri	Raffa - Doubles Mixed	10 July
Gold	Ahmed Triak; Tarek Zekiri	Raffa - Men's Doubles	10 July
Gold	Chahrezad Chibani; Besma Boukernafa	Raffa - Women's Doubles	10 July
Gold	Rabah Bachene; Abdelhay Nabib; Abdeldjalil Boukhefardji	Petanque - Men's triplet	11 July
Gold	Nadia Djabri	Petanque - Women's Precision shooting	11 July
Gold	Mohamed Benslim; Mohamed Lamine Chachoua	Lyonnaise - Men's Double	11 July
Silver	Chahrezad Chibani	Raffa- Women's Precision shooting	10 July
Silver	Abdeldjalil Boukhefardji; Nadia Djabri	Petanque - Double Mixed	11 July
Silver	Nadia Djabri; Ibtissem Baba Arbi; Ossiane Heline Tamane	Petanque - Women's triplet	11 July
Silver	Mohamed Lamine Chachoua	Lyonnaise - Men's Precision shooting	11 July
Silver	Mohamed Lamine Chachoua; Celia Afenai	Lyonnaise - Double Mixed	11 July
Bronze	Asma Hammadi	Lyonnaise - Women's Precision shooting	11 July
Bronze	Asma Hammadi; Celia Afenai	Lyonnaise - Women's Double	11 July

==== Gymnastics ====
Medal	Name	Event	Date
Gold	Hillal Metidji; Hmida Djaber; Bilal Bellaoui; Housse Eddine Hamadouche; Ahmed Riadh Aliouat	Men's team	7 July
Gold	Hillal Metidji	Men's Rings	9 July
Gold	Malek Rezagui	Floor Exercise	10 July
Gold	Lahna Salem	Balance Beam	10 July
Gold	Ahmed Riadh Aliouat	Men's Horizontal Bar	10 July
Gold	Ahmed Riadh Aliouat	Men's Parallel Bars	10 July
Silver	Fatma Zohra Boukhatem	All-Around	7 July
Silver	Lahna Salem	Uneven Bars	9 July
Silver	Fatma Zohra Boukhatem	Floor Exercise	10 July
Silver	Sihem Hamidi	Balance Beam	10 July
Silver	Housse Eddine Hamadouche	Men's Vault	10 July
Bronze	Lahna Salem	All-Around	7 July
Bronze	Fatma Zohra Boukhatem	Uneven Bars	9 July
Bronze	Sihem Hamidi	Vault	9 July
Bronze	Bilal Bellaoui	Men's Rings	9 July
Bronze	Hmida Djaber	Men's Horizontal Bar	10 July

==== Cycling ====
Medal	Name	Event	Date
Gold	Nesrine Houili; Yasmine Elmeddah; Khadidja Araoui; Sihem Bousba	Women's team Time Trial	9 July
Gold	Nesrine Houili	Women's Individual Time Trial	11 July
Gold	Nesrine Houili; Imene Maldji; Yasmine Elmeddah; Yamna Bouyacor; Sihem Bousba; Khadidja Araoui; Hosna Bellili; Chahra Azouz	women's road race team	13 July
Gold	Chahra Azouz	Women's Road Race	13 July
Gold	Yacine Hamza	Men's Road Race	14 July
Gold	Yacine Hamza; Youcef Reguigui; Hamza Amari; Abdelkrim Farkous; Abdallah Ben Youcef; Oussama Cheblaoui; Mohamed Amine Nehari; Abderaouf Bengayou	Men's road race team	14 July
Silver	Youcef Reguigui; Mohamed Amine Nehari; Abderaouf Bengayou; Hamza Amari	Men's team Time Trial	9 July
Silver	Khadidja Araoui	Women's Road Race	13 July
Bronze	Yasmine Elmeddah	Women's Road Race	13 July
Bronze	Youcef Reguigui	Men's Road Race	14 July

==== Karate ====
Medal	Name	Event	Date
Gold	Saber Benmakhlouf	Men's Kata Individual	13 July
Gold	Cylia Ouikene	Women's Kumite -50kg	13 July
Gold	Louiza Abouriche	Women's Kumite -55kg	13 July
Gold	Saber Benmakhlouf; Abdelali Tahoulit; Badis Abderrahmane Belaabed	Men's Kata team	14 July
Gold	Aicha Narimane Dahlab	Women's Kata Individual	14 July
Silver	Aicha Narimane Dahlab; Sara Hanouti; Rayane Salakedji	Women's Kata team	13 July
Silver	Chaima Midi	Women's Kumite -61kg	13 July
Silver	Chaima Oudira	Women's Kumite +68kg	14 July
Bronze	Naim Abdesselam Rouichi	Men's Kumite -60kg	13 July
Bronze	Fouad Benbara	Men's Kumite -67kg	13 July
Bronze	Karima Mekkaoui	Women's Kumite -68kg	14 July
Bronze	Hocine Daikhi	Men's Kumite +84kg	14 July

==== Fencing ====
Medal	Name	Event	Date
Gold	Charline Boukhlifaa	Women's Épée Individual	9 July
Gold	Saoussen Boudiaf	Women's Sabre Individual	9 July
Gold	Meriem Mebarki	Women's Foil Individual	10 July
Gold	Saoussen Boudiaf; Zohra Nora Kehli; Kaouther Mohammed Belkbir; Chaima Benadouda	Women's Sabre team	11 July
Gold	Meriem Mebarki; Sonia Zebboudj; Selma Lilia Benchekor; Yasmine Tantast	Women's Foil team	12 July
Silver	Zohra Nora Kehli	Women's Sabre Individual	9 July
Bronze	Zacharia Bounachada	Men's Sabre Individual	10 July
Bronze	Charline Boukhlifaa; Yousra Zebboudj; Maroua Gueham; Ines El Batoul Taleb	Women's Épée team	11 July
Bronze	Youcef Madi; Salim Heroui; Thibaud Bekkat; Vergil Albert	Men's Foil team	11 July

==== Weightlifting ====
Medal	Name	Event	Date
Gold	Fatima Zohra Laghouati	Women's 59kg Clean jerk	12 July
Gold	Faris Touairi	Men's 89kg Snatch	13 July
Gold	Aymen Touairi	Men's 102kg Clean Jerk	14 July
Silver	Fatima Zohra Laghouati	Women's 59kg Snatch	12 July
Silver	Amina Yahia Mamoun	Women's +81kg Snatch	14 July
Silver	Amina Yahia Mamoun	Women's +81kg Clean jerk	14 July
Silver	Salim Elbagor	Men's +102kg Snatch	14 July
Silver	Aymen Touairi	Men's 102kg Snatch	14 July
Silver	Salim Elbagor	Men's +102kg Clean Jerk	14 July
Bronze	Nadia Katbi	Women's 49kg Snatch	11 July
Bronze	Samir Fardjallah	Men's 73kg Clean Jerk	12 July
Bronze	Faris Touairi	Men's 89kg Clean Jerk	13 July

==== Badminton ====
Medal	Name	Event	Date
Gold	Koceila Mammeri; Youcef Sabri Medel	Men's Doubles	10 July
Gold	Koceila Mammeri; Tanina Mammeri	Mixed Doubles	10 July
Gold	Linda Mazri; Yassmina Chibah	Women's Doubles	10 July
Silver	Adel Hamek; Mohamed Abderrahim Belarbi	Men's Doubles	10 July
Silver	Adel Hamek	Men's Singles	10 July
Silver	Mohamed Abderrahim Belarbi; Linda Mazri	Mixed Doubles	10 July
Silver	Tanina Mammeri; Halla Bouksani	Women's Doubles	10 July
Bronze	Sif Eddine Larbaoui; Mohamed Abdelaziz Ouchefoun	Men's Doubles	10 July
Bronze	Tanina Mammeri	Women's Singles	10 July
Bronze	Youcef Sabri Medel	Men's Singles	10 July
Bronze	Mohamed Abdelaziz Ouchefoun; Halla Bouksani	Mixed Doubles	10 July
Bronze	Sif Eddine Larbaoui; Yassmina Chibah	Mixed Doubles	10 July
Bronze	Houda Ferd; Nihad Benhaoua	Women's Doubles	10 July

==== Sailing ====
Medal	Name	Event	Date
Gold	Maissa Abdelfettah	ILCA 6 Women	13 July
Gold	Ines Chellali	ILCA 4 Women	13 July
Silver	Lina Guebli	Optimist U 12 Mixed	13 July
Silver	Lina Guebli	Optimist Women	13 July
Silver	Mallia Karssane	ILCA 6 Women	13 July
Silver	Sofia Ourabah	ILCA 4 Women	13 July
Bronze	Nadia Amriche; Brahim Hadjas; Naim Chakor; Zakaria Mallim; Ayoub Chaouchi	Optimist Mixed team	13 July
Bronze	Niaama Lalaoui	ILCA 4 Women	13 July
Bronze	Abdelkhalek Boussouar	ILCA 7 Men	13 July

==== Table tennis ====
Medal	Name	Event	Date
Gold	Mehdi Bouloussa; Sami Kherouf; Abdelbasst Chaichi; Maheidine Bella; Milhane Amine Jellouli	Men's team	12 July
Gold	Sami Kherouf; Lynda Loghraibi	Double Mixte	13 July
Silver	Mehdi Bouloussa	Men's Singles	14 July
Bronze	Lynda Loghraibi; Malissa Nasri; Hadjer Tahmi; Amina Lynda Kessaci; Houda Nourhane Taguercifi	Women's team	11 July
Bronze	Lynda Loghraibi; Malissa Nasri	Women's Doubles	13 July
Bronze	Malissa Nasri	Women's Singles	14 July
Bronze	Lynda Loghraibi	Women's Singles	14 July

==== Chess ====
Medal	Name	Event	Date
Silver	Sabrina Latreche; Zineb Dina Abdi; Lina Nassr; Hayat Toubal; Chahrazad Djerroud; Manel Nassr; Imene Zerarga; Nouha Mazouz; Ryma Nassr	Women team	9 July
Silver	Bilel Youcef Bellahcene	Individual rapid	12 July
Silver	Sabrina Latreche	Individual blitz	13 July
Bronze	Sabrina Latreche	Individual rapid	12 July
Bronze	Lina Nassr	Individual blitz	13 July
Bronze	Bilel Youcef Bellahcene	Individual blitz	13 July

=== Medals by gender ===
Medals by gender
Gender	1st place, gold medalist(s)	2nd place, silver medalist(s)	3rd place, bronze medalist(s)	Total	Percentage
Male	51	36	37	124	49.01%
Female	49	37	32	118	46.64%
Mixed	5	3	3	11	4.35%
Total	105	76	72	253	100%

=== Medals by date ===
Medals by date
Day	Date	1st place, gold medalist(s)	2nd place, silver medalist(s)	3rd place, bronze medalist(s)	Total
1	4 July	2	0	4	6
2	5 July	12	7	5	24
3	6 July	10	7	7	24
4	7 July	10	6	8	24
5	8 July	4	2	3	9
6	9 July	14	8	6	28
7	10 July	17	16	10	43
8	11 July	13	9	7	29
9	12 July	7	4	6	17
10	13 July	9	8	10	27
11	14 July	7	9	6	22
Total		105	76	72	253

=== Multiple medalists ===
Athletes with 3 medals or more
Name	Sport	1st place, gold medalist(s)	2nd place, silver medalist(s)	3rd place, bronze medalist(s)	Total
Jaouad Syoud	Swimming	11	0	0	11
Nesrine Medjahed	Swimming	4	1	3	8
Amel Melih	Swimming	6	0	0	6
Redouane Bouali	Swimming	4	0	2	6
Fares Benzidoun	Swimming	3	1	1	5
Moncef Aymen Balamane	Swimming	1	3	1	5
Hamida Rania Nefsi	Swimming	4	0	0	4
Imene Kawthar Zitouni	Swimming	1	2	1	4
Lynda Loghraibi	Table tennis	1	0	3	4
Ahmed Riadh Aliouat	Gymnastics	3	0	0	3
Nesrine Houili	Cycling	3	0	0	3
Khadidja Araoui	Cycling	2	1	0	3
Chahrezad Chibani	Boules	2	1	0	3
Yasmine Elmeddah	Cycling	2	0	1	3
Mohamed Lamine Chachoua	Boules	1	2	0	3
Lahna Salem	Gymnastics	1	1	1	3
Tanina Mammeri	Badminton	1	1	1	3
Youcef Reguigui	Cycling	1	1	1	3
Hichem Taibi	Cycling	1	0	2	3
Fatma Zohra Boukhatem	Gymnastics	0	2	1	3
Sabrina Latreche	Chess	0	2	1	3
Ramzi Chouchar	Swimming	0	2	1	3
Malissa Nasri	Table tennis	0	0	3	3

== Football ==
There is a competition for men only (the competition for women is not held).

=== Group A ===
Pos	Team	Pld	W	D	L	GF	GA	GD	Pts	Qualification
1	Algeria (H)	3	2	1	0	4	1	+3	7	Advance to Semifinals
2	Sudan	3	2	0	1	6	2	+4	6	Advance to Semifinals
3	Oman (E)	3	1	1	1	1	2	−1	4	
4	Lebanon (E)	3	0	0	3	0	6	−6	0	

Updated to match(es) played on 5 July 2023. Source: GSA
(E) Eliminated; (H) Hosts
2 July 2023
21:00

Algeria	0–0	Oman
	Report

19 May 1956 Stadium, Annaba
Referee: Muath Owfi (Palestine)

5 July 2023
21:00

Sudan	1–2	Algeria
Ismat 75'	Report	Temine 87', 90+2'

19 May 1956 Stadium, Annaba
Referee: Mohammad Qanah (Syria)

8 July 2023
21:00

Algeria	2–0	Lebanon
Bounacer 16'; Sryer 90+3'	Report

19 May 1956 Stadium, Annaba
Referee: Mohamed Khaled (Bahrain)

=== Semi-finals ===
11 July 2023
17:30

Algeria	1–2	Saudi Arabia
Temine 49'	Report	A. Al-Zaid 19', 74'

19 May 1956 Stadium, Annaba
Referee: Abdel Aziz Mohamed Bouh (Mauritania)

=== Bronze medal match ===
14 July 2023
17:30

Algeria	2–2	Sudan
Temine 16'; Nait Salem 58'	Report	Nooh 87', 90+2'
Penalties
Benzid (penalty missed); Reguieg (penalty scored); Djenidi (penalty missed); Bouras (penalty scored)	2–4	(penalty missed) Nooh; (penalty scored) Mahmoud; (penalty scored) Ali; (penalty scored) Al-Bahli; (penalty scored) Babeker

19 May 1956 Stadium, Annaba
Referee: Mohamed Khaled (Bahrain)

== Handball ==
There is a competition for men only (the competition for women is not held).

=== Preliminary round ===
Pos	Team	Pld	W	D	L	GF	GA	GD	Pts	Qualification
1	Qatar	4	3	0	1	110	92	+18	6	Advance to Semifinals
2	Saudi Arabia	4	3	0	1	104	81	+23	6	Advance to Semifinals
3	Algeria (H)	4	2	1	1	103	92	+11	5	Advance to Semifinals
4	Iraq	4	1	1	2	99	98	+1	3	Advance to Semifinals
5	Jordan (E)	4	0	0	4	82	135	−53	0	

Source: ArabGames2023
Rules for classification: 1) points; 2) head-to-head points; 3) head-to-head goal difference; 4) head-to-head number of goals scored; 5) goal difference.
(E) Eliminated; (H) Hosts

6 July 2023; 19:00	Algeria	39–22	Jordan	Hamou Boutlélis Sports Palace, Oran; Referees: Alyazidi, Alhail (QAT)
6 July 2023; 19:00		(20-10)		Hamou Boutlélis Sports Palace, Oran; Referees: Alyazidi, Alhail (QAT)
6 July 2023; 19:00		Report		Hamou Boutlélis Sports Palace, Oran; Referees: Alyazidi, Alhail (QAT)

7 July 2023; 19:00	Algeria	28–27	Qatar	Hamou Boutlélis Sports Palace, Oran; Referees: Raouf Gasmi, Karim Gasmi (FRA)
7 July 2023; 19:00		(14-15)		Hamou Boutlélis Sports Palace, Oran; Referees: Raouf Gasmi, Karim Gasmi (FRA)
7 July 2023; 19:00		Report		Hamou Boutlélis Sports Palace, Oran; Referees: Raouf Gasmi, Karim Gasmi (FRA)

8 July 2023; 19:00	Algeria	21–21	Iraq	Hamou Boutlélis Sports Palace, Oran; Referees: Ayasra, Ghunaimat (JOR)
8 July 2023; 19:00	Naïm, Bounab 5	(11-9)	Al Azzawi 5	Hamou Boutlélis Sports Palace, Oran; Referees: Ayasra, Ghunaimat (JOR)
8 July 2023; 19:00		Report		Hamou Boutlélis Sports Palace, Oran; Referees: Ayasra, Ghunaimat (JOR)

11 July 2023; 17:00	Algeria	15–22	Saudi Arabia	Hamou Boutlélis Sports Palace, Oran; Referees: Raouf Gasmi, Karim Gasmi (FRA)
11 July 2023; 17:00	Abrous 5	(9-13)	Al-Salem 6	Hamou Boutlélis Sports Palace, Oran; Referees: Raouf Gasmi, Karim Gasmi (FRA)
11 July 2023; 17:00		Report		Hamou Boutlélis Sports Palace, Oran; Referees: Raouf Gasmi, Karim Gasmi (FRA)

=== Semifinals ===
12 July 2023; 19:30	Algeria	19–20	Saudi Arabia	Hamou Boutlélis Sports Palace, Oran; Referees: Alyazidi, Alhail (QAT)
12 July 2023; 19:30	Melazem 6	(9-9)	Al-Abdulali, Al-Abbas 6	Hamou Boutlélis Sports Palace, Oran; Referees: Alyazidi, Alhail (QAT)
12 July 2023; 19:30		Report		Hamou Boutlélis Sports Palace, Oran; Referees: Alyazidi, Alhail (QAT)

=== Third place game ===
14 July 2023
17:00
Algeria
31–29 (ET)
Iraq
Miloud Hadefi Complex Omnisport Arena, Oran
Referees: Ayasra, Ghunaimat (JOR)

(9-13)

Report

FT: 23–23 ET: 3–3, 5–3

== Volleyball ==
=== Men's ===
==== Preliminary round ====
Pos	Team	Pld	W	L	Pts	SW	SL	SR	SPW	SPL	SPR	Qualification
1	Algeria (H)	4	4	0	12	12	0	MAX	301	187	1.610	Advance to Semifinals
2	Libya	4	3	1	9	9	3	3.000	289	221	1.308	Advance to Semifinals
3	Qatar	4	2	2	6	6	7	0.857	270	301	0.897	Advance to Semifinals
4	Jordan	4	1	3	3	3	9	0.333	230	287	0.801	Advance to Semifinals
5	Palestine (E)	4	0	4	0	1	12	0.083	227	321	0.707	

Source: ArabGames2023
(E) Eliminated; (H) Host

Date	Time		Score		Set 1	Set 2	Set 3	Set 4	Set 5	Total	Report
6 July	19:00	Algeria	3–0	Palestine	25–13	25–11	25–11			75–35	Report
7 July	19:00	Algeria	3–0	Qatar	25–12	25–16	25–12			75–40	Report
8 July	19:00	Algeria	3–0	Libya	25–23	25–18	25–20			75–61	Report
9 July	19:00	Algeria	3–0	Jordan	25–14	26–24	25–14			76–52	Report

==== Semi finals ====
Date	Time		Score		Set 1	Set 2	Set 3	Set 4	Set 5	Total	Report
12 July	16:00	Algeria	3–0	Jordan	25–16	25–18	25–17			75–51	Report

==== Final ====
Date	Time		Score		Set 1	Set 2	Set 3	Set 4	Set 5	Total	Report
14 July	19:00	Algeria	0–3	Libya	29–31	18–25	17–25			64–81	Report

=== Women's ===
==== Preliminary round ====
Pos	Team	Pld	W	L	Pts	SW	SL	SR	SPW	SPL	SPR	Qualification
1	Algeria (H)	4	4	0	12	12	0	MAX	300	131	2.290	Advance to Semifinals
2	Tunisia	4	3	1	9	9	3	3.000	311	281	1.107	Advance to Semifinals
3	United Arab Emirates	4	2	2	5	6	8	0.750	225	168	1.339	Advance to Semifinals
4	Jordan	4	1	3	4	5	9	0.556	231	290	0.797	Advance to Semifinals
5	Qatar (E)	4	0	4	0	0	12	0.000	103	300	0.343	

Source: ArabGames2023
(E) Eliminated; (H) Host

Date	Time		Score		Set 1	Set 2	Set 3	Set 4	Set 5	Total	Report
6 July	13:00	Algeria	3–0	United Arab Emirates	25–7	25–12	25–7			75–26	Report
7 July	13:00	Algeria	3–0	Tunisia	25–18	25–23	25–19			75–60	Report
8 July	13:00	Algeria	3–0	Jordan	25–12	25–8	25–8			75–28	Report
10 July	13:00	Algeria	3–0	Qatar	25–7	25–5	25–5			75–17	Report

==== Semi final ====
Date	Time		Score		Set 1	Set 2	Set 3	Set 4	Set 5	Total	Report
12 July	10:00	Algeria	3–0	Jordan	25–10	25–6	25–13			75–29	Report

==== Final ====
Date	Time		Score		Set 1	Set 2	Set 3	Set 4	Set 5	Total	Report
14 July	16:00	Algeria	3–0	Tunisia	25–23	25–23	25–23			75–69	Report

== Basketball 3x3 ==
=== Men's ===
==== Preliminary round ====
Pos	Team	Pld	W	L	PF	PA	PD	Qualification
1	Tunisia	3	3	0	57	45	+12	Advance to Quarterfinals
2	Algeria (H)	3	2	1	46	44	+2	Advance to Quarterfinals
3	Palestine	3	1	2	45	40	+5	Advance to Quarterfinals
4	Jordan	3	0	3	36	55	−19	Advance to Quarterfinals

Source: ArabGames2023
Rules for classification: 1) Wins; 2) Head-to-head record; 3) Points scored.
(H) Hosts

12 July 2023
19:10

Report

Algeria	18–21	Tunisia

12 July 2023
21:20

Report

Algeria	15–12	Jordan

13 July 2023
18:30

Report

Algeria	13–11	Palestine

==== Quarterfinals ====
13 July 2023
21:40

Report

Algeria	16–08	Saudi Arabia

==== Semifinals ====
14 July 2023
19:20

Report

Algeria	16–14	Qatar

==== Gold medal game ====
14 July 2023
21:40

Report

Algeria	19–18	Tunisia

=== Women's ===
==== Preliminary round ====
Pos	Team	Pld	W	L	PF	PA	PD	Qualification
1	Algeria (H)	3	3	0	51	37	+14	Advance to Semifinals
2	Tunisia	3	2	1	59	35	+24	Advance to Semifinals
3	Jordan	3	1	2	43	41	+2	Advance to Semifinals
4	Saudi Arabia	3	0	3	21	61	−40	Advance to Semifinals

Source: ArabGames2023
Rules for classification: 1) Wins; 2) Head-to-head record; 3) Points scored.
(H) Hosts

12 July 2023
19:50

Report

Algeria	18–10	Saudi Arabia

12 July 2023
22:00

Report

Algeria	14–10	Jordan

13 July 2023
19:50

Report

Algeria	19–17	Tunisia

==== Semi-final ====
14 July 2023
18:40

Report

Algeria	18–10	Saudi Arabia

==== Gold medal game ====
14 July 2023
21:20

Report

Algeria	13–16	Tunisia
