= 3x3 basketball at the 2023 Arab Games =

Basketball 3x3 at the 2023 Arab Games
- Venue: Ouagnouni Stadium
- Location: Algiers, Algeria
- Dates: 12–14 July

Basketball 3x3 at the 2023 Arab Games took place in Ouagnouni Stadium in Algiers, Algeria from 12 to 14 July. In this tournament, 8 teams played in the men's competition, and 4 teams participated in the women's competition.

== Medal table ==
* Host nation (Algeria)

2023 Basketball 3×3 Arab Games medal table
Rank	NOC	Gold	Silver	Bronze	Total
1	Algeria (ALG)*	1	1	0	2
1	Tunisia (TUN)	1	1	0	2
3	Jordan (JOR)	0	0	1	1
3	Qatar (QAT)	0	0	1	1
5	Iraq (IRQ)	0	0	0	0
5	Libya (LBA)	0	0	0	0
5	Mauritania (MTN)	0	0	0	0
5	Palestine (PLE)	0	0	0	0
5	Saudi Arabia (KSA)	0	0	0	0
Totals (9 entries)		2	2	2	6
