= Boules at the 2023 Arab Games =

- Venue: LOFA Sports Complex
- Location: Es Senia, Oran, Algeria
- Dates: 6-10 July

At the 2023 Arab Games, the Boules events were held at the LOFA Sports Complex in Es Senia, Oran, Algeria, Qatar from 6 to 10 July. A total of 17 events were contested.

In this edition, Mauritania wins it first Arab Games medal of the history after nine participations at the games. Abdullah Mohamed Vally wins the silver medal.

== Medal table ==
* Host nation (Algeria)

2023 Boules Arab Games medal table
Rank	NOC	Gold	Silver	Bronze	Total
1	Algeria (ALG)*	8	5	2	15
2	Tunisia (TUN)	6	8	3	17
3	Morocco (MAR)	3	2	6	11
4	Libya (LBA)	0	1	2	3
5	Mauritania (MTN)	0	1	0	1
6	Palestine (PLE)	0	0	4	4
Totals (6 entries)		17	17	17	51

== Medal summary ==
=== Petanque ===
==== Men ====
Event	Gold	Silver	Bronze
Triplet	Algeria (ALG); Boukhefardji Abdeldjalil; Abdelhay Nabib; Rabah Bachene	Morocco (MAR); Ali El Mekkaoui; Youssef Seghir; Lhoussain Akbas	Tunisia (TUN); Mohamed Khaled Bougriba; Majdi Hammami; Sofien Ben Brahim
Precision Shooting	Bougriba Mohamed Khaled (TUN)	Abdallahi Mohamed Vall (MTN)	Ali El Mekkaoui (MAR)

==== Women ====
Event	Gold	Silver	Bronze
Triplet	Tunisia (TUN); Imane Latifi; Rajaa Mchaaliya; Aya Bouraoui	Algeria (ALG); Djabri Nadia; Ibtissem Baba Arbi; Oussiane Heline Tamane	Palestine (PLE); Rawane Saffi; Marwa Al Farh; Shahd Alkhatib
Precision Shooting	Djabri Nadia (ALG)	Rajaa Mchaaliya (TUN)	Rawan Saffi (PLE)

==== Mixed ====
Event	Gold	Silver	Bronze
Double	Tunisia (TUN); Majdi Hammami; Imane Latifi	Algeria (ALG); Abdeldjalil Boukhefardji; Nadia Djabri	Palestine (PLE); Moghir Bedouane; Shahd Alkhatib

=== Raffa ===
==== Men ====
Event	Gold	Silver	Bronze
Double	Algeria (ALG); Ahmed Triak; Tarek Zekiri	Libya (LBA); Feras Zalitani; Abdulmuhymin Zantouti	Tunisia (TUN); Khalil Jelassi; Oussama Balti
Individual	Ahmed Triak (ALG)	Khalil Jelassi (TUN)	Abdulmuhymin Zantouti (LBA)
Precision Shooting	Yassine Ouinaksi (MAR)	Oussama Balti (TUN)	Feras Zalitani (LBA)

==== Women ====
Event	Gold	Silver	Bronze
Double	Algeria (ALG); Besma Boukernafa; Chahrezad Chibani	Tunisia (TUN); Aya Dabboussi; Sabrine Zekri	Palestine (PLE); Zohour Bashir; Nisreen Alkhatib
Individual	Besma Boukernafa (ALG)	Sara El Mzamzi-El Idrissi (MAR)	Aya Dabboussi (TUN)
Precision Shooting	Aya Dabboussi (TUN)	Chahrezad Chibani (ALG)	Sara El Mzamzi-El Idrissi (MAR)

==== Mixed ====
Event	Gold	Silver	Bronze
Double	Algeria (ALG); Tarek Zekiri; Chahrezad Chibani	Tunisia (TUN); Khalil Jelassi; Sabrine Zekri	Morocco (MAR); Abdeljalil El Moustafid; Sara El Mzamzi-El Idrissi

=== Lyonnaise ===
==== Men ====
Event	Gold	Silver	Bronze
Double	Algeria (ALG); Mohamed Lamine Chachoua; Mohamed Benslim	Tunisia (TUN); Rayen Hamdi; Hamza Khiari	Morocco (MAR); Mostafa Fares; Mohamed El-gouamouss
Precision Shooting	Rayen Hamdi (TUN)	Mohamed Lamine Chachoua (ALG)	Mostafa Fares (MAR)

==== Women ====
Event	Gold	Silver	Bronze
Double	Morocco (MAR); Fatiha Teghraoui; Bouchra Lefhal Al Aloui	Tunisia (TUN); Yousra Mohamdi; Hadil Hannachi	Algeria (ALG); Celia Afenai; Asma Hammadi
Precision Shooting	Fatiha Teghraoui (MAR)	Yousra Mohamdi (TUN)	Asma Hammadi (ALG)

==== Mixed ====
Event	Gold	Silver	Bronze
Double	Tunisia (TUN); Hamza Khiari; Hadil Hannachi	Algeria (ALG); Mohamed Lamine Chachoua; Celia Afenai	Morocco (MAR); Mohamed Al-Guamouss; Bouchra Lefhal Al Aloui

== Participating nations ==
- Algeria (14)
- Mauritania (3)
- Morocco (10)
- Tunisia (14)
- Libya (6)
- Palestine (12)
- Comoros (7)
- Djibouti (5)
