= Fencing at the 2023 Arab Games =

- Venue: Ben Aknoun Women's Center Hall
- Location: Ben Aknoun, Algiers, Algeria
- Dates: 9–12 July

At the 2023 Arab Games, the fencing events were held at Ben Aknoun Women's Center Hall in Ben Aknoun, Algiers, Algeria from 9 to 12 July. A total of 12 events were contested.

== Fencing Medal table ==
* Host nation (Algeria)

2023 Fencing Arab Games medal table
Rank	NOC	Gold	Silver	Bronze	Total
1	Algeria (ALG)*	5	1	3	9
2	Jordan (JOR)	2	3	5	10
3	Kuwait (KUW)	2	2	3	7
4	Qatar (QAT)	2	0	3	5
5	Tunisia (TUN)	1	4	3	8
6	United Arab Emirates (UAE)	0	2	1	3
7	Saudi Arabia (KSA)	0	0	6	6
8	Iraq (IRQ)	0	0	0	0
8	Libya (LBA)	0	0	0	0
Totals (9 entries)		12	12	24	48

== Medal summary ==
=== Men's events ===
Event	Gold	Silver	Bronze
Foil	Ali Owaida (QAT)	Ali Nassar (KUW)	Abdalla Khalifa (QAT); Ali Abbas (KUW)
Épée	Iyad Daoud Mohammad Odeh (JOR)	Hassan Alfudari (KUW)	Meshal Alqahtani (QAT); Abdulaziz Alshatti (KUW)
Sabre	Fares Ferjani (TUN)	Ahmed Ferjani (TUN)	Zacharia Bounachada (ALG); Osama Ziad Khaleel Almasri (JOR)
Team Foil	Qatar	United Arab Emirates	Kuwait; Algeria
Team Épée	Kuwait	Jordan	Qatar; Saudi Arabia
Team Sabre	Kuwait	Tunisia	Jordan; Saudi Arabia

=== Women's events ===
Event	Gold	Silver	Bronze
Foil	Meriem Mebarki (ALG)	Roaa Nedal Abdelrahman Majali (JOR)	Nourane Bchir (TUN); Yasmine Ayari (TUN)
Épée	Charline Zahra Clai Boukhlifaa (ALG)	Dina Taiysir Hasan Mansi (JOR)	Fawzya Faris B Alkhibiri (KSA); Shahed Ali Khaleel Alkloub (JOR)
Sabre	Soussen Dlinda H Boudiaf (ALG)	Zohra Nora Kehli (ALG)	Yasmine Daghfous (TUN); Elhamad Elhasna (KSA)
Team Foil	Algeria	Tunisia	United Arab Emirates; Jordan
Team Épée	Jordan	United Arab Emirates	Saudi Arabia; Algeria
Team Sabre	Algeria	Tunisia	Saudi Arabia; Jordan

== Participating nations ==
- Jordan (15)
- Saudi Arabia (19)
- Iraq (11)
- Libya (3)
- Qatar (10)
- United Arab Emirates (17)
- Algeria (25)
- Kuwait (12)
- Tunisia (12)
