= Table tennis at the 2023 Arab Games =

Table tennis event held at July 9–14

- Venue: Tipaza Multisports Hall
- Location: Tipaza, Algeria
- Dates: 9–14 July

At the 2023 Arab Games, the table tennis events were held at Tipaza Multisports Hall in Tipaza, Algeria from 9 to 14 July. A total of 6 events were contested.

== Medal table ==
* Host nation (Algeria)

2023 Table tennis Arab Games medal table
| Rank | NOC | Gold | Silver | Bronze | Total |
|---|---|---|---|---|---|
| 1 | Tunisia (TUN) | 2 | 3 | 0 | 5 |
| 2 | Algeria (ALG)* | 2 | 1 | 4 | 7 |
| 3 | Saudi Arabia (KSA) | 2 | 1 | 0 | 3 |
| 4 | Bahrain (BHR) | 1 | 2 | 2 | 5 |
| 5 | Jordan (JOR) | 0 | 0 | 3 | 3 |
| 6 | Iraq (IRQ) | 0 | 0 | 2 | 2 |
| 6 | Qatar (QAT) | 0 | 0 | 2 | 2 |
| 8 | Syria (SYR) | 0 | 0 | 1 | 1 |
| 9 | Libya (LBA) | 0 | 0 | 0 | 0 |
| 9 | Mauritania (MTN) | 0 | 0 | 0 | 0 |
| 9 | Palestine (PLE) | 0 | 0 | 0 | 0 |
| 9 | Sudan (SUD) | 0 | 0 | 0 | 0 |
| 9 | United Arab Emirates (UAE) | 0 | 0 | 0 | 0 |
| Totals (13 entries) | | 7 | 7 | 14 | 28 |

=== Medalists ===
| Event | Gold | Silver | Bronze |
|---|---|---|---|
| Men's singles | Saudi Arabia; Ali Noor M Alkhadraoui | Algeria; Mehdi Bouloussa | Iraq; Ameer Thamer Mohammed Al-Nuaimi |
| Men's singles | Saudi Arabia; Ali Noor M Alkhadraoui | Algeria; Mehdi Bouloussa | Bahrain; Rashed Rashed |
| Men's doubles | Saudi Arabia; Abdulaziz Saad A Bushulaybi; Azzam Zeeni M Alim | Bahrain; Mohamed Saleh; Rashed Rashed | Qatar; Ahmad Al-Mohannadi; Mohammed A.Hussein |
| Men's doubles | Saudi Arabia; Abdulaziz Saad A Bushulaybi; Azzam Zeeni M Alim | Bahrain; Mohamed Saleh; Rashed Rashed | Iraq; Omar Ayad Thaer Taher; Mohammed Zeyad Taher Taher |
| Women's singles | Tunisia; Fadwa Garci | Tunisia; Abir Haj Salah | Algeria; Lynda Loghraibi |
| Women's singles | Tunisia; Fadwa Garci | Tunisia; Abir Haj Salah | Algeria; Malissa Nasri |
| Women's doubles | Tunisia; Fadwa Garci; Abir Haj Salah | Bahrain; Maryam Alaali; Amruta Phadke | Algeria; Lynda Loghraibi; Malissa Nasri |
| Women's doubles | Tunisia; Fadwa Garci; Abir Haj Salah | Bahrain; Maryam Alaali; Amruta Phadke | Jordan; Batool Basim Hasan Khader; Taimmaa Yousef Asad Abo-Yaman |
| Mixed doubles | Algeria; Lynda Loghraibi; Sami Kherouf | Tunisia; Fadwa Garci; Adam Hmam | Jordan; Taimmaa Yousef Asad Abo-Yaman; Zaid Yousef Asad Abo-Yaman |
| Mixed doubles | Algeria; Lynda Loghraibi; Sami Kherouf | Tunisia; Fadwa Garci; Adam Hmam | Bahrain; Maryam Alaali; Rashed Rashed |
| Men's Team | Algeria | Saudi Arabia | Qatar |
| Men's Team | Algeria | Saudi Arabia | Jordan |
| Women's Team | Bahrain | Tunisia | Algeria |
| Women's Team | Bahrain | Tunisia | Syria |

== Participating nations ==
- Algeria (10)
- Palestine (3)
- Saudi Arabia (4)
- Syria (4)
- Tunisia (8)
- United Arab Emirates (4)
- Iraq (10)
- Qatar (5)
- Mauritania (2)
- Libya (3)
- Sudan (4)
- Jordan (9)
- Bahrain (9)
