= Wrestling at the 2023 Arab Games =

- Venue: La Coupole Arena
- Location: Algiers, Algeria
- Dates: 9–11 July

At the 2023 Arab Games, the wrestling events were held at La Coupole Arena in Algiers, Algeria from 9 to 11 July. A total of 20 events were contested. Algeria finished first with nine gold medals.

== Medal table ==
* Host nation (Algeria)

2023 Wrestling Arab Games medal table
Rank	NOC	Gold	Silver	Bronze	Total
1	Algeria (ALG)*	9	8	2	19
2	Iraq (IRQ)	6	9	3	18
3	Tunisia (TUN)	3	1	4	8
4	Syria (SYR)	2	1	5	8
5	Jordan (JOR)	0	1	3	4
6	Saudi Arabia (KSA)	0	0	2	2
7	Palestine (PLE)	0	0	1	1
8	Comoros (COM)	0	0	0	0
8	Kuwait (KUW)	0	0	0	0
8	Mauritania (MTN)	0	0	0	0
8	Yemen (YEM)	0	0	0	0
Totals (11 entries)		20	20	20	60

== Medal overview ==
=== Men's freestyle ===
Event	Gold	Silver	Bronze
57kg	Khattab Al-Ani; Iraq	Salaheddine Kateb; Algeria	Ibrahim Altabaa; Syria
61kg	Abdelhak Kherbache; Algeria	Shaheed Alkhalifa; Iraq	Abdullah Assaf; Palestine
65kg	Mohammed Kareem; Iraq	Zohier Iftene; Algeria	Farouk Jelassi; Tunisia
70kg	Ali Al-Obaidi; Iraq	Abderrahmane Benaissa; Algeria	Mohamed Ali Zorgui; Tunisia
74kg	Yousif Al Dulaimi; Iraq	Abdelkader Ikkal; Algeria	Orts Isakov; Jordan
79kg	Chems Eddine Fetairia; Algeria	Mustafa Al-Jamie; Iraq	Alaa Abchrafe; Syria
86kg	Yanaal Baraze; Syria	Fateh Benferdjallah; Algeria	Issa Al-Obaidi; Iraq
92kg	Wali Eddine Kebir; Algeria	Mahd Feda Aldin Al Asta; Syria	Abdul Kareem Abuidaij; Jordan
97kg	Mohamed Saadaoui; Tunisia	Fadi Rouabah; Algeria	Ibrahim Fallatah; Saudi Arabia
125kg	Omar Sarem; Syria	Ahmed Al-Jamie; Iraq	Hamza Rahmani; Tunisia

=== Men's Greco-Roman ===
Event	Gold	Silver	Bronze
55kg	Saajad Albidhan; Iraq	Mohamed Yacine Dridi; Algeria	Hassan Alharth; Saudi Arabia
60kg	Ali Albidhan; Iraq	Mohamed Hkiri; Tunisia	Abdelkarim Fergat; Algeria
63kg	Abdeldjebar Djebbari; Algeria	Karrar Albeedhan; Iraq	Muhamad Fwaz; Syria
67g	Ishak Ghaiou; Algeria	Mohammed Al Saedi; Iraq	Ammar Al Tahan; Syria
72kg	Abdelmalek Merabet; Algeria	Taha Al-Salihi; Iraq	Mohamad Alobeid; Syria
77kg	Sami Slama; Tunisia	Akrem Boudjemline; Algeria	Ali Alaboda; Iraq
82kg	Abdelkrim Ouakali; Algeria	Sultan Eid; Jordan	Hussein Albidhan; Iraq
87kg	Bachir Sid Azara; Algeria	Abbas Al-Tameemi; Iraq	Yahia Abu Tabikh; Jordan
97kg	Adem Boudjemline; Algeria	Ali al-kaabi Iraq	Skander Missaoui; Tunisia
130kg	Amine Guennichi; Tunisia	Ali Al-Sharuee; Iraq	Hichem Kouchit; Algeria

== Participating nations ==
- Algeria (20)
- Iraq (19)
- Kuwait (2)
- Jordan (6)
- Mauritania (1)
- Palestine (4)
- Saudi Arabia (14)
- Syria (12)
- Tunisia (20)
- Comoros (2)
- Yemen (1)
