= Badminton at the 2023 Arab Games =

- Venue: ESHRA Ain Benian Hall
- Location: Aïn Bénian, Algiers
- Dates: 5–10 July

Badminton was contested at the 2023 Arab Games in ESHRA Ain Benian Hall, Aïn Bénian, Algiers, Algeria from July 05 to July 10, 2023.

Algeria topped the medal table, winning three gold medals, four silver and six bronze.

== Medal table ==
* Host nation (Algeria)

2023 Badminton Arab Games medal table
Rank	NOC	Gold	Silver	Bronze	Total
1	Algeria (ALG)*	3	4	6	13
2	Jordan (JOR)	1	1	2	4
3	Bahrain (BHR)	1	0	0	1
4	Syria (SYR)	0	0	2	2
5	Tunisia (TUN)	0	0	0	0
Totals (5 entries)		5	5	10	20

=== Medalists ===
Event	Gold	Silver	Bronze
Men's singles	Bahrain; Adnan Hasan	Algeria; Adel Hamek	Algeria; Youcef Sabri Medel
Men's singles	Bahrain; Adnan Hasan	Algeria; Adel Hamek	Jordan; Bahaedeen Ahmad Alshannik
Men's doubles	Algeria; Koceila Mammeri; Youcef Sabri Medel	Algeria; Adel Hamek; Mohamed Abderrahim Belarbi	Jordan; Bahaedeen Ahmad Alshannik; Izzeldeen Abu Arrah
Men's doubles	Algeria; Koceila Mammeri; Youcef Sabri Medel	Algeria; Adel Hamek; Mohamed Abderrahim Belarbi	Algeria; Sif Eddine Larbaoui; Mohamed Abdelaziz Ouchefoun
Women's singles	Jordan; Maryam Abuarrah	Jordan; Marah Omar	Syria; Sanaa Mahmoud
Women's singles	Jordan; Maryam Abuarrah	Jordan; Marah Omar	Algeria; Tanina Mammeri
Women's doubles	Algeria; Linda Mazri; Yassmina Chibah	Algeria; Tanina Mammeri; Halla Bouksani	Algeria; Houda Ferd; Nihad Benhaoua
Women's doubles	Algeria; Linda Mazri; Yassmina Chibah	Algeria; Tanina Mammeri; Halla Bouksani	Syria; Sanaa Mahmoud; Ranim Hasbani
Mixed doubles	Algeria; Koceila Mammeri; Tanina Mammeri	Algeria; Mohamed Abderrahime Belarbi; Linda Mazri	Algeria; Mohamed Abdelaziz Ouchefoun; Halla Bouksani
Mixed doubles	Algeria; Koceila Mammeri; Tanina Mammeri	Algeria; Mohamed Abderrahime Belarbi; Linda Mazri	Algeria; Sif Eddine Larbaoui; Yassmina Chibah

== Participating nations ==
A total of 10 nations competed in badminton at the 2023 Arab Games:

- Algeria
- Bahrain
- Iraq
- Jordan
- Kuwait
- Qatar
- Saudi Arabia
- Syria
- Tunisia
- United Arab Emirates

== Participants ==
Country	Men's	Women's	Total athletes
Algeria (ALG)	1. Koceila Mammeri; 2. Adel Hamek; 3. Mohamed Abderrahime Belarbi; 4. Sif Eddine Larbaoui; 5. Samy Khaldi; 6. Mustapha Kessari; 7. Youcef Sabri Medel; 8. Mohamed Abdelaziz Ouchefoun; 9. Daoud Aymen	1. Tanina Mammeri; 2. Halla Bouksani; 3. Linda Mazri; 4. Yassmina Chibah; 5. Rahima Sefsaf; 6. Houda Ferd; 7. Nihad Benhaoua; 8. Dounia Naâma	17
Bahrain (BHR)	1. Adnan Hasan; 2. Jaafar Hasan		2
Iraq (IRQ)	1. Yousif Khudhur; 2. Murtadha Allahigy; 3. Muntadher Allahigy; 4. Karrar Al-Humairi	1. Hajir Haneer; 2. Maryam Mahdi; 3. Maryam Haneer; 4. Sana Eisaq	8
Jordan (JOR)	1. Bahaedeen Ahmad Alshannik; 2. Izzeldeen Abu Arrah	1. Marah Omar; 2. Maryam Abuarrah	4
Kuwait (KUW)	1. Abdalhadi Mohammed; 2. Hussain Mohammad	1. Zainab Abdullah; 2. Fatemah Daham	4
Qatar (QAT)	1. Saoud Abdulkareem; 2. Fahad Al-Mahmoud; 3. Bakhit Al-Ghanim; 4. Sultan Am-Malki		4
Saudi Arabia (KSA)	1. Yazan Saigh; 2. Abdullah Meshal Aldawsari; 3. Muath Alghamdi; 4. Mahd Shaikh; 5. Nawaf Alghamdi	1. Khadijah Kawthar; 2. Haya Almudarra; 3. Fatumah Mousa	8
Syria (SYR)	1. Ahmad Aljallad; 2. Amjad Al Fassih; 3. Mikhail Gelashvili	1. Sanaa Mahmoud; 2. Ranim Hasbani; 3. Dasha Dhedhula	8
Tunisia (TUN)	1. Mohamed Tarhouni; 2. Oubeid Kasraoui; 3. Ahmed Chtioui	1. Safa Jebali; 2. Narim Jebali; 3. Wiem Ben Ahmed	6
United Arab Emirates (UAE)	1. Mohammad Flamarzi; 2. Abdulaziz Mohamed; 3. Naser Alsayegh; 4. Hamid Almazrouei	1. Maryam Alblooshi; 2. Ghadeer Altahri; 3. Farah Alhajji; 4. Hind Alhelali	8
