= Mariem Homrani =

Tunisian boxer (born 1991)

Personal information
- Full name: Mariem Homrani Ep Zayani
- Nationality: Tunisian
- Born: 25 January 1991 (age 35) Tunis, Tunisia

Sport
- Sport: Boxing
Medal record
Pan-Arab Games
Silver medal – second place	2023 Algeria	-60 kg
African Championships
Silver medal – second place	2014 Yaoundé	-57 kg

Mariem Homrani Ep Zayani (Arabic: مريم حمراني الزياني, born 25 January 1991) is a Tunisian boxer. She competed in the women's lightweight event at the 2020 Summer Olympics.
