= Boxing at the 2023 Arab Games =

Boxing competitions

- Venue: Ben Aknoun Military Center Hall
- Location: Ben Aknoun, Algiers, Algeria
- Dates: 7–12 July

At the 2023 Arab Games, the boxing events were held at Ben Aknoun Military Center Hall in Ben Aknoun, Algiers, Algeria from 7 to 12 July. A total of 21 events were contested.

== Medal summary ==
=== Men ===
Event	Gold	Silver	Bronze
Minimum (-48kg)	Kamel Khennoussi (ALG)	Hamza Essaadi (MAR)	Shuail Ghaleb Mohammed Alqarnas (YEM)
Minimum (-48kg)	Kamel Khennoussi (ALG)	Hamza Essaadi (MAR)	Ward Ali (SYR)
Fly (-51kg)	Ala Eddine Zidi (TUN)	Hussein Al Masri (SYR)	Said Mortaji (MAR)
Fly (-51kg)	Ala Eddine Zidi (TUN)	Hussein Al Masri (SYR)	Huthaifa Mohammad Yousef Eshish (JOR)
Bantam (-54kg)	Imad Azoui (MAR)	Mohamed Flissi (ALG)	Moamin Abdalaal Abed Al-Abboodi (IRQ)
Bantam (-54kg)	Imad Azoui (MAR)	Mohamed Flissi (ALG)	Majrashi Zayid (KSA)
Feather (-57kg)	Soulaimane Samghouli (MAR)	Yousef Ibrahim Yousef Iashash (JOR)	Bilel Mhamdi (TUN)
Feather (-57kg)	Soulaimane Samghouli (MAR)	Yousef Ibrahim Yousef Iashash (JOR)	Wasim Abusal (PLE)
Light (-60kg)	Mohammad Adnan Abu Jajeh (JOR)	Saiefeddine Ayari (TUN)	Mohamed Hamout (MAR)
Light (-60kg)	Mohammad Adnan Abu Jajeh (JOR)	Saiefeddine Ayari (TUN)	Salem Tamma (ALG)
Light Welter (-63.5kg)	Jugurtha Ait Bekka (ALG)	Abdelhaq Nadir (MAR)	Mehdi Dridi (TUN)
Light Welter (-63.5kg)	Jugurtha Ait Bekka (ALG)	Abdelhaq Nadir (MAR)	Ali Qasim Hamdan Al-Sarray (IRQ)
Welter (-67kg)	Chemseddine Kramou (ALG)	Karrar Kadhim Sahm Alezairej (IRQ)	Oussama Rabii (MAR)
Welter (-67kg)	Chemseddine Kramou (ALG)	Karrar Kadhim Sahm Alezairej (IRQ)	Zakaria Romdhani (TUN)
Light middle (-71kg)	Zeyad Ishaish (JOR)	Zine Elabidine Amroug (MAR)	Youcef Islam Yaiche (ALG)
Light middle (-71kg)	Zeyad Ishaish (JOR)	Zine Elabidine Amroug (MAR)	Yousif Naeem Hussein Hussein (IRQ)
Middle (-75kg)	Ahmad Ghossoun (SYR)	Ahmed Abderraouf Ghazli (ALG)	Mohammad Ahmad Ibrahim Almharat (JOR)
Middle (-75kg)	Ahmad Ghossoun (SYR)	Ahmed Abderraouf Ghazli (ALG)	Nabil Boussif (TUN)
Light Heavy (-80kg)	Hussein Iashaish (JOR)	Mohammed Ifraydhah (LBA)	Youssef Rafrafi (TUN)
Light Heavy (-80kg)	Hussein Iashaish (JOR)	Mohammed Ifraydhah (LBA)	Mohammed Ahmed Alsubhi (KSA)
Cruiser (-86kg)	Odai Riyad Ade Alhindawi (JOR)	Amer Kadhum Ghaneem Ghaneem (IRQ)	Azzouz Boudia (ALG)
Heavy (-92kg)	Alaa Eldin Ghousoon (SYR)	Ghaoth Houimli (TUN)	Mohammad Younis Mohammad Suleiman (JOR)
Heavy (-92kg)	Alaa Eldin Ghousoon (SYR)	Ghaoth Houimli (TUN)	Tarek Taruket (ALG)
Super Heavy (+92kg)	Mourad Kadi (ALG)	Mohammad Mlaiyes (SYR)	Mohmoud Omar Mahmoud Ghanem (JOR)

=== Women ===
Event	Gold	Silver	Bronze
Minimum (-48kg)	Fatiha Mansouri (ALG)	Yasmine Moutaqui (MAR)	Reem Hazim Alsharif (KSA)
Minimum (-48kg)	Fatiha Mansouri (ALG)	Yasmine Moutaqui (MAR)	Wafa Hafsi (TUN)
Light fly (-50kg)	Roumaysa Boualam (ALG)	Wiem Jouini (TUN)	
Fly (-52kg)	Hanan Ayed Suleiman Nassar (JOR)	Chadha Jlassi (TUN)	Souha Miloudi (ALG)
Fly (-52kg)	Hanan Ayed Suleiman Nassar (JOR)	Chadha Jlassi (TUN)	Haya Ali (UAE)
Bantam (-54kg)	Widad Bertal (MAR)	Fatima Zohra Abdelkader Hadjala (ALG)	Amel Chebbi (TUN)
Light (-60kg)	Hadjila Khelif (ALG)	Mariem Homrani (TUN)	Hadeel Ghazwan Ashour (KSA)
Light (-60kg)	Hadjila Khelif (ALG)	Mariem Homrani (TUN)	Jeninzeynab Heck (PLE)
Light Welter (-63kg)	Zobeida Hayam Fatima Zahr (ALG)	Amnaimi Ragha Ibrahim (KSA)	
Welter (-66kg)	Imane Khelif (ALG)	Oumaïma Belahbib (MAR)	
Middle (-75kg)	Saida Lahmidi (MAR)	Djouher Benane (ALG)	

== Medal table ==
* Host nation (Algeria)

2023 Boxing Pan Arab Games medal table
Rank	NOC	Gold	Silver	Bronze	Total
1	Algeria (ALG)*	9	4	5	18
2	Jordan (JOR)	5	1	4	10
3	Morocco (MAR)	4	5	4	13
4	Syria (SYR)	2	2	1	5
5	Tunisia (TUN)	1	5	8	14
6	Iraq (IRQ)	0	2	4	6
7	Saudi Arabia (KSA)	0	1	4	5
8	Libya (LBA)	0	1	0	1
9	Palestine (PLE)	0	0	2	2
9	United Arab Emirates (UAE)	0	0	2	2
11	Qatar (QAT)	0	0	1	1
11	Yemen (YEM)	0	0	1	1
Totals (12 entries)		21	21	36	78

== Participating nations ==
- Algeria (21)
- Iraq (8)
- Libya (3)
- Palestine (5)
- Saudi Arabia (11)
- Syria (7)
- Tunisia (15)
- Jordan (12)
- Morocco (14)
- Yemen (2)
- United Arab Emirates (4)
- Qatar (2)
- Sudan (3)
