= Syria at the 2023 Arab Games =

- IOC code: SYR
- NOC: Syrian Olympic Committee

in Algeria July 5, 2023 – July 15, 2023
- Competitors: 105 in 14 sports
- Medals Ranked 6th: Gold 14 Silver 15 Bronze 24 Total 53

Arab Games appearances
- 1953; 1957; 1965; 1976; 1985; 1992; 1997; 1999; 2004; 2007; 2023

Syria is participating at the 2023 Arab Games, which is being held in Algeria from 5 to 15 July 2023. Syria returns to the Games after withdrawing from the 2011 edition for political reasons. It competed with 105 athletes in 14 sports. Syria is fifth in the overall standings before the start of this edition.

== Medalists ==
Medal	Name	Sport	Event	Date
Gold	Ahmad Ghousoon	Boxing	Men's -75 kg	11 July
Gold	Alaa Eldin Ghousoon	Boxing	Men's -92 kg	11 July
Gold	Aleksandra Maksimova	Gymnastics	Women's All-around	6 July
Gold	Aleksandra Maksimova	Gymnastics	Women's Uneven Bars	8 July
Gold	Lais Najjar	Gymnastics	Men's All-around	6 July
Gold	Lais Najjar	Gymnastics	Men's Floor	8 July
Gold	Omar Abbas	Swimming	Men's 200m Freestyle	5 July
Gold	Omar Abbas	Swimming	Men's 400m Freestyle	4 July
Gold	Goana Reyes	Swimming	Women's 400m Freestyle	7 July
Gold	Goana Reyes	Swimming	Women's 800m Freestyle	5 July
Gold	Yanaal Baraze	Wrestling	Men's freestyle 86 kg	10 July
Gold	Omar Sarem	Wrestling	Men's freestyle 125 kg	9 July
Gold	Man Asaad	Weightlifting	Men's +102 kg Snatch	14 July
Gold	Man Asaad	Weightlifting	Men's +102 kg Clean & Jerk	14 July
Silver	Hussein Al Masri	Boxing	Men's -51 kg	11 July
Silver	Mohammad Mlaiyes	Boxing	Men's +92 kg	11 July
Silver	Akar Ali Salih; Ali Layth Ahmed Al Othman; Hussein Al-Ali; Aryan Kareem; Ahmed Abdulwahab	Chess	Men's team	9 July
Silver	Bashir Ayiti	Chess	Men's individual	13 July
Silver	Myran Al Fares; Marah Khdeer; Lojain Hassan; Maha Shmales	Cycling	Women's TTT	9 July
Silver	Myran Al Fares; Marah Khdeer; Lojain Hassan; Maha Shmales; Amira Al Olabi; Sandy Dergham	Cycling	Women's Road Race team	13 July
Silver	Myran Al Fares	Cycling	Women's ITT	11 July
Silver	Lais Najjar	Gymnastics	Men's Horizontal Bar	9 July
Silver	Aleksandra Maksimova	Gymnastics	Women's Vault	8 July
Silver	Adam Taook	Judo	Men's -66 kg	4 July
Silver	Omar Abbas; Laith Lakmoosh; Enas Sorkine; Goana Reyes	Swimming	4×100m Freestyle Mixed	9 July
Silver	Omar Abbas	Swimming	Men's 100m Freestyle	8 July
Silver	Goana Reyes	Swimming	Women's 100m Freestyle	5 July
Silver	Mahd Feda Aldin Al Asta	Wrestling	Men's freestyle 92 kg	10 July
Silver	Syria national under-23 football team	Football	Men's tournament	14 July
Bronze	Ward Ali	Boxing	Men's -48 kg	8 July
Bronze	Sanaa Mahmoud	Badminton	Women's singles	9 July
Bronze	Sanaa Mahmoud; Ranim Hasbani	Badminton	Women's doubles	11 July
Bronze	Afamya Mir Mahmoud; Manar Khalil; Roula Mahmoud; Fatema Al Zahraa Ahmad Murad; Doha Farha	Chess	Women's team	6 July
Bronze	Malek Koniahli	Chess	Men's individual rapid	11 July
Bronze	Manar Khalil	Chess	Women's individual rapid	13 July
Bronze	Lais Najjar; Mohamad Khalil; Feras Bahlawan; Yazan Al Souliman	Gymnastics	Men's team	7 July
Bronze	Lais Najjar	Gymnastics	Men's Vault	9 July
Bronze	Lais Najjar	Gymnastics	Men's Parallel Bars	9 July
Bronze	Aleksandra Maksimova	Gymnastics	Women's Balance Beam	9 July
Bronze	Aleksandra Maksimova	Gymnastics	Women's Floor	9 July
Bronze	Hasan Bayan; Suleiman Al Refai; Adam Taook; Doulet Aslan	Judo	Men's team	7 July
Bronze	Hasan Bayan	Judo	Men's -73 kg	4 July
Bronze	Laila Kenan	Judo	Women's -48 kg	4 July
Bronze	Dana Khatsheek	Judo	Women's -52 kg	4 July
Bronze	Omar Abbas; Laith Lakmoosh; Enas Sorkine; Goana Reyes	Swimming	4×100m Medley Mixed	6 July
Bronze	Osama Trabulsi	Swimming	Men's 400m Individual Medley	8 July
Bronze	Leen Ayyash	Swimming	Women's 200m Breaststroke	9 July
Bronze	Zena Asaad; Hend Zaza; Ibaa Hallak; Ghazal Zaher	Table tennis	Women's team	6 July
Bronze	Mohamad Fawaz	Wrestling	Men's Greco-Roman 63 kg	8 July
Bronze	Ammar Al Tahan	Wrestling	Men's Greco-Roman 67 kg	9 July
Bronze	Mohamad Al Obeid	Wrestling	Men's Greco-Roman 72 kg	8 July
Bronze	Ibrahim Al Tabtaa	Wrestling	Men's Freestyle 57 kg	9 July
Bronze	Alaa Abchrafe	Wrestling	Men's Freestyle 79 kg	10 July

== Medals by sport ==
Sport	Gold	Silver	Bronze	Total
Swimming	4	3	3	10
Gymnastics	4	2	5	11
Boxing	2	2	1	5
Wrestling	2	1	5	8
Weightlifting	2	0	0	2
Cycling	0	3	0	3
Chess	0	2	3	5
Judo	0	1	4	5
Football	0	1	0	1
Badminton	0	0	2	2
Table tennis	0	0	1	1
Totals (11 entries)	14	15	24	53

== Sports ==
=== Football ===
Group stage

Pos	Team	Pld	W	D	L	GF	GA	GD	Pts	Qualification
1	Syria	3	1	2	0	5	3	+2	5	Advance to semi-finals
2	Saudi Arabia U19	3	1	2	0	4	3	+1	5	Advance to semi-finals
3	Palestine	3	0	2	1	2	3	−1	2	
4	Mauritania	3	0	2	1	4	6	−2	2	

Source: GSA
2 July 2023
17:30

Saudi Arabia	1–1	Syria
Al-Zaid 90+6' (pen.)	Report	Mardikian 18'

Mohamed Hamlaoui Stadium, Constantine
Referee: Mehrez Melki (Tunisia)

5 July 2023
17:30

Syria	0–0	Palestine
	Report

Mohamed Hamlaoui Stadium, Constantine
Referee: Mohamed Khaled (Bahrain)

8 July 2023
17:30

Mauritania	2–4	Syria
Sheikh 16'; Ahmed 21'	Report	Mardikian 6'; Dahan 55'; Rihani 60'; Osman 70'

19 May 1956 Stadium, Annaba
Referee: Ammar Ashkanani (Kuwait)

Knockout stage

=== Semifinals ===
11 July 2023
21:00

Syria	2–0	Sudan
	Report

19 May 1956 Stadium, Annaba
Referee: Zaid Thamer Mohammed (Iraq)

=== Gold medal match ===
14 July 2023
21:00

Saudi Arabia	1–1	Syria
Al-Zaid 11'	Report	Mardikian 45'
Penalties
	5–4

19 May 1956 Stadium, Annaba
Referee: Mehrez Melki (Tunisia)
