= Judo at the 2023 Arab Games =

Judo competition

Judo Judo at the 2023 Arab Games
- Venue: La Coupole d’Alger Arena
- Location: Algiers, Algeria
- Dates: 5–7 July

Competition at external databases
- Links: IJF • JudoInside

At the 2023 Arab Games, the judo events were held at La Coupole Arena in Algiers, Algeria from 5 to 7 July. A total of 16 events were contested.

== Medal summary ==
=== Men ===
Event	Gold	Silver	Bronze
-60 kg	Fraj Dhouibi (TUN)	Bilal Mansour Soud Almansour (JOR)	Ali Khousrof (YEM)
-60 kg	Fraj Dhouibi (TUN)	Bilal Mansour Soud Almansour (JOR)	Younes Saddiki (MAR)
-66 kg	Wail Ezzine (ALG)	Adam Taook (SYR)	Aziz Harbi (TUN)
-66 kg	Wail Ezzine (ALG)	Adam Taook (SYR)	Ahmad Salem Mohammad Alrfou (JOR)
-73 kg	Messaoud Dris (ALG)	Hassan Doukkali (MAR)	Bayan Hasan (SYR)
-73 kg	Messaoud Dris (ALG)	Hassan Doukkali (MAR)	Aleddine Ben Chalbi (TUN)
-81 kg	Achraf Moutii (MAR)	Aghiles Imad Benazoug (ALG)	Hachem Sellami (TUN)
-81 kg	Achraf Moutii (MAR)	Aghiles Imad Benazoug (ALG)	Sajjad Ghanim Sehen Sehen (IRQ)
-90 kg	Abdelaziz Ben Ammar (TUN)	Oussama Kabri (ALG)	Hussein Ali (IRQ)
-90 kg	Abdelaziz Ben Ammar (TUN)	Oussama Kabri (ALG)	Abdallah Aman Mohammad Miqdad (JOR)
-100 kg	Mustapha Bouamar (ALG)	Koussay Ben Ghars (TUN)	Redha Lamri (ALG)
+100 kg	Mohamed El Mehdi Lili (ALG)	Mohammed Lahboub (MAR)	Hussein Ahmad Hussein Ayyal Salman (JOR)
Team	Tunisia (TUN); Fraj Dhouibi; Mohamed Mtiri; Aziz Harbi; Aleddine Ben Chalbi; Wajdi Hajji; Hachem Sellami; Abdelaziz Ben Ammar; Koussay Ben Ghars	Algeria (ALG); Wail Ezzine; Messaoud Dris; Oussama Djeddi; Houd Zourdani; Djamel Eddine Souilah; Aghiles Imad Benazoug; Oussama Kabri; Mustapha Bouamar; Mohamed El Mehdi Lili; Kais Mahie Eddine Moudetere; Achour Denni; Rayane Zakaria Benatia; Redha Lamri; Anouar Abdelkader Hached	Morocco (MAR); Younes Saddiki; Abderrahmane Boushita; Hassan Doukkali; Achraf Moutii; Mohammed Lahboub
Team	Tunisia (TUN); Fraj Dhouibi; Mohamed Mtiri; Aziz Harbi; Aleddine Ben Chalbi; Wajdi Hajji; Hachem Sellami; Abdelaziz Ben Ammar; Koussay Ben Ghars	Algeria (ALG); Wail Ezzine; Messaoud Dris; Oussama Djeddi; Houd Zourdani; Djamel Eddine Souilah; Aghiles Imad Benazoug; Oussama Kabri; Mustapha Bouamar; Mohamed El Mehdi Lili; Kais Mahie Eddine Moudetere; Achour Denni; Rayane Zakaria Benatia; Redha Lamri; Anouar Abdelkader Hached	Syria (SYR); Bayan Hasan; Suleiman Al-Refai; Adam Taook; Doulet Aslan

=== Women ===
Event	Gold	Silver	Bronze
-48 kg	Oumaima Bedioui (TUN)	Houaria Kaddour (ALG)	Laila Kenan (SYR)
-52 kg	Soumiya Iraoui (MAR)	Faïza Aissahine (ALG)	Dana Khatsheek (SYR)
-52 kg	Soumiya Iraoui (MAR)	Faïza Aissahine (ALG)	Rahma Tibi (TUN)
-57 kg	Yamina Halata (ALG)	Mariem Jmour (TUN)	Marwa Chemkhi (TUN)
-63 kg	Amina Belkadi (ALG)	Maram Jmour (TUN)	Mouna Manai (TUN)
-70 kg	Nihel Bouchoucha (TUN)	Souad Bellakehal (ALG)	
-78 kg	Hafsa Yatim (MAR)	Arij Akkab (TUN)	
+78 kg	Sonia Asselah (ALG)	Sarra Mzougui (TUN)	Meroua Mammeri (ALG)
Team	Algeria (ALG); Sonia Asselah; Zina Bouakache; Yamina Halata; Amina Belkadi; Souad Bellakehal; Faïza Aissahine; Meroua Mammeri; Dyhia Benchallal	Tunisia (TUN); Oumaima Bedioui; Rahma Tibi; Mariem Jmour; Nihel Bouchoucha; Arij Akkab; Sarra Mzougui; Marwa Chemkhi; Mouna Manai	

== Medal table ==
* Host nation (Algeria)

2023 Judo Arab Games medal table
Rank	NOC	Gold	Silver	Bronze	Total
1	Algeria (ALG)*	8	6	2	16
2	Tunisia (TUN)	5	6	6	17
3	Morocco (MAR)	3	2	2	7
4	Syria (SYR)	0	1	4	5
5	Jordan (JOR)	0	1	3	4
6	Iraq (IRQ)	0	0	2	2
7	Yemen (YEM)	0	0	1	1
Totals (7 entries)		16	16	20	52
