= Ahmed Madan (cyclist) =

Bahraini road cyclist

Personal information
- Full name: Ahmed Madan
- Born: 25 August 2000 (age 26)
- Height: 1.76 m (5 ft 9 in)
- Weight: 65 kg (143 lb)

Cycling career
- Sport: Cycling
- Current team: Bahrain Victorious Development Team
- Discipline: Road
- Role: Rider

Professional teams
- 2020: Bahrain Cycling Academy
- 2021–2024: Team Bahrain Victorious
- 2025–: Bahrain Victorious Development Team

Ahmed Madan (born 25 August 2000) is a Bahraini road cyclist, who currently rides for UCI Continental team Bahrain Victorious Development Team. He previously rode for UCI WorldTeam Team Bahrain Victorious, making him the first cyclist from Bahrain to ride at the World Tour level.

== Major results ==
2022
1st Time trial, Asian Under-23 Road Championships
1st Road race, National Road Championships
1st Time trial, Islamic Solidarity Games
4th Road race, Arab Road Championships
2023
2nd Time trial, Arab Games
9th Time trial, Asian Under-23 Road Championships
