= Rami Al-Rahmouni =

Saudi Arabian swimmer (born 2009)

Personal information
- Full name: Rami Bilal Al-Rahmouni
- Born: 1 January 2009 (age 17)

Sport
- Sport: Swimming
- Strokes: Freestyle
Medal record
Men's swimming
Representing Saudi Arabia
Youth Olympic Games
Gold medal – first place	2026 Dakar	400 m freestyle
Representing Tunisia
Arab Championships
Gold medal – first place	2023 Abu Dhabi	800 m freestyle
Arab Games
Gold medal – first place	2023 Algeria	1500 m freestyle
Silver medal – second place	2023 Algeria	4×200 m freestyle relay

Rami Bilal Al-Rahmouni (born 1 January 2009) is a Saudi Arabian swimmer.

== Career ==
Al-Rahmouni began his career representing Tunisia. In July 2023, he competed at the 2023 Arab Games and won a gold medal in the 1500 metre freestyle. In October 2023, he competed at the 2023 Arab Swimming Championships and won a gold medal in the 800 metre freestyle with a time of 8:15.29. In April 2026, he gained naturalization in Saudi Arabia with the intention of representing the country going forward. Hadia Mansour, the president of the Tunisian Swimming Federation, confirmed he stopped contact with the federation and his parent club for two years.

In November 2026, he competed at the 2026 Summer Youth Olympics and won a gold medal in the 400 metre freestyle with a time of 3:47.86. This was the first gold medal in Saudi Arabia's history at any Olympic Games in swimming. It was also the second gold medal won by a Saudi delegation at the Youth Olympic Games.
