= Sailing at the 2023 Arab Games =

- Venue: Les Sablettes Park
- Location: Algiers, Algeria
- Dates: 8–13 July

At the 2023 Arab Games, the sailing events were held at Les Sablettes Park in Algiers, Algeria, from 8 to 13 July. A total of 8 events were contested.

== Medal table ==
* Host nation (Algeria)

2023 Sailing Arab Games medal table
Rank	NOC	Gold	Silver	Bronze	Total
1	Bahrain (BHR)	3	0	1	4
2	Algeria (ALG)*	2	4	3	9
3	Oman (OMA)	2	2	1	5
4	United Arab Emirates (UAE)	1	1	3	5
5	Tunisia (TUN)	0	1	0	1
6	Iraq (IRQ)	0	0	0	0
6	Morocco (MAR)	0	0	0	0
6	Qatar (QAT)	0	0	0	0
6	Sudan (SUD)	0	0	0	0
Totals (9 entries)		8	8	8	24
