= Cycling at the 2023 Arab Games =

- Venue: Tipaza Urban Circuit
- Location: Tipaza, Algeria
- Dates: 9–14 July

At the 2023 Arab Games, the cycling events were held at Tipaza Urban Circuit in Tipaza, Algeria from 9 to 14 July. A total of 8 events were contested.

== Medal table ==
* Host nation (Algeria)

2023 Cycling Arab Games medal table
| Rank | NOC | Gold | Silver | Bronze | Total |
|---|---|---|---|---|---|
| 1 | Algeria (ALG)* | 6 | 2 | 2 | 10 |
| 2 | Morocco (MAR) | 2 | 1 | 0 | 3 |
| 3 | Syria (SYR) | 0 | 3 | 0 | 3 |
| 4 | United Arab Emirates (UAE) | 0 | 1 | 2 | 3 |
| 5 | Bahrain (BHR) | 0 | 1 | 1 | 2 |
| 6 | Saudi Arabia (KSA) | 0 | 0 | 3 | 3 |
| 7 | Iraq (IRQ) | 0 | 0 | 0 | 0 |
| 7 | Kuwait (KUW) | 0 | 0 | 0 | 0 |
| 7 | Qatar (QAT) | 0 | 0 | 0 | 0 |
| 7 | Tunisia (TUN) | 0 | 0 | 0 | 0 |
| Totals (10 entries) | | 8 | 8 | 8 | 24 |

== Medal summary ==
=== Men ===
| Event | Gold | | Silver | | Bronze | |
|---|---|---|---|---|---|---|
| Individual Time Trial | Mouhcine Elkouraji (MAR) | 00h41'27" | Ahmed Madan (BHN) | 00h42'22" | Ahmed Naser (BHN) | 00h42'26" |
| Team Time Trial | Morocco (MAR); Achraf Eddoghmy; Mohcine Elkouraji; Adil Elarbaoui; Oussama Khafi | 01h17'59" | Algeria (ALG); Youcef Reguigui; Mohamed Amine Nehari; Abderaouf Bengayou; HAMZA Amari | 01h20'08" | United Arab Emirates (UAE); Saif Alkaabi; Jaber Almansoori; Abdulla Jasim Al-Ali; Abdulla Alhammadi | 01h28'09" |
| Individual Road Race | Yacine Hamza (ALG) | 02h56'22" | Abdulla Jasim Al-Ali (UAE) | 02h56'22" | Youcef Reguigui (ALG) | 02h56'22" |
| Team Road Race | Algeria (ALG) | | Morocco (MAR) | | United Arab Emirates (UAE) | |

=== Women ===
| Event | Gold | | Silver | | Bronze | |
|---|---|---|---|---|---|---|
| Individual Time Trial | Nesrine Houili (ALG) | 00h21'52" | Myran Al Fares (SYR) | 00h23'06" | Daniah Adnan O Sembawa (KSA) | 00h23'13" |
| Team Time Trial | Algeria (ALG); Nesrine Houili; Imene Maldji; Yasmine Elmeddah; Khadidja Araoui | 00h47'17" | Syria (SYR); Marah Khdeer; Myran Al Fares; Lojain Hasan; Maha Shmales | 00h50'04" | Saudi Arabia (KSA); Dania Adnan O Sembawa; Mishael Ibrahem M Alhazmi; Monirah Mohammed S Aldraiweesh | 00h52'26" |
| Individual Road Race | Chahra Azouz (ALG) | 01h43'56" | Khadidja Araoui (ALG) | 01h45'30" | Yasmine Elmeddah (ALG) | 01h45'30" |
| Team Road Race | Algeria (ALG) | 05h14'56" | Syria (SYR) | 05h16'30" | Saudi Arabia (KSA) | 05h24'11" |
