= Chess at the 2023 Arab Games =

- Venue: Constantine Military Complex Hall
- Location: Constantine, Algeria
- Dates: 7–13 July

At the 2023 Arab Games, the chess events were held at Constantine Military Complex Hall in Constantine, Algeria from 10 to 22 December. A total of 6 events were contested.

== Chess Medal table ==
* Host nation (Algeria)

2023 Chess Arab Games medal table
Rank	NOC	Gold	Silver	Bronze	Total
1	United Arab Emirates (UAE)	4	1	0	5
2	Qatar (QAT)	2	0	0	2
3	Algeria (ALG)*	0	3	3	6
4	Syria (SYR)	0	2	2	4
5	Iraq (IRQ)	0	0	1	1
6	Jordan (JOR)	0	0	0	0
6	Kuwait (KUW)	0	0	0	0
6	Libya (LBA)	0	0	0	0
6	Mauritania (MTN)	0	0	0	0
6	Palestine (PLE)	0	0	0	0
Totals (10 entries)		6	6	6	18

== Medal summary ==
=== Men ===
Event	Gold	Silver	Bronze
Rapid Team	United Arab Emirates	Syria	Iraq
Rapid Individual	Salem A.R. Saleh (UAE)	Bellahcene Billel (ALG)	Koniahli Malek (SYR)

==== Women ====
Event	Gold	Silver	Bronze
Rapid Team	United Arab Emirates	Algeria	Syria
Rapid Individual	Zhu Chen (QAT)	Rouda Essa Alserkal (UAE)	Latreche Sabrina (ALG)

== Participating nations ==
- Syria (10)
- Palestine (4)
- Libya (2)
- Mauritania (4)
- Qatar (5)
- Algeria (19)
- Iraq (10)
- United Arab Emirates (10)
- Tunisia (4)
- Kuwait (4)
- Somalia (6)
- Jordan (2)
