= Swimming at the 2023 Arab Games =

- Venue: Miloud Hadefi Complex Aquatic Center
- Location: Bir El Djir, Oran, Algeria
- Dates: 5–10 July

Swimming at the 2023 Arab Games was held at Miloud Hadefi Complex Aquatic Center in Bir El Djir, Oran, Algeria from 5 to 10 July.

== Participating nations ==
12 nations entered 72 swimmers (49 males, 23 females) at the 2023 Arab Games:

- Algeria (25)
- Bahrain (4)
- Iraq (2)
- Jordan (6)
- Libya (2)
- Mauritania (1)
- Palestine (7)
- Qatar (2)
- Saudi Arabia (4)
- Syria (6)
- Tunisia (10)
- United Arab Emirates (3)

== Results ==
=== Men ===
Event	Gold		Silver		Bronze	
50m Freestyle	Emad Zapen (JOR)	23.59	Mohammed Bedour (JOR)	23.61	Yousif Bu Arish (KSA)	23.90
100m Freestyle	Emad Zapen (JOR)	51.64	Omar Abbas (SYR)	51.97	Redouane Bouali (ALG)	52.06
200m Freestyle	Omar Abbas (SYR)	1:52.98	Mohamed Ali Chaouachi (TUN)	1:53.70	Redouane Bouali (ALG)	1:54.51
400m Freestyle	Omar Abbas (SYR)	3:58.43	Mohamed Khalil Ben Ajmia (TUN)	4.00.67	Mohamed Khalil Ben Chaabane (TUN)	4.02.36
1500m Freestyle	Rami Rahmouni (TUN)	15:42.52	Ramzi Chouchar (ALG)	16:27.01	Ahmed Alhashim (KSA)	17:59.64
50m Backstroke	Yazan Al-Bawwab (PLE)	26.72	Laith Sabbah (JOR)	27.18	Akram Amine Ammar (ALG)	27.24
100m Backstroke	Yazan Al-Bawwab (PLE)	57.10	Laith Sabbah (JOR)	57.34	Hichem Taibi (ALG)	58.41
200m Backstroke	Mohamed Khalil Ben Ajmia (TUN)	2:04.37	Moncef Benbara (ALG)	2:05.21	Hichem Taibi (ALG)	2:08.13
50m Breaststroke	Jaouad Syoud (ALG)	27.85	Amro Al-Wir (JOR)	28.53	Moncef Balamane (ALG)	28.76
100m Breaststroke	Amro Al-Wir (JOR)	1:01.56	Moncef Balamane (ALG)	1:03.03	Saud Ebrahim (BHR)	1:05.69
200m Breaststroke	Amro Al-Wir (JOR)	2:14.02	Moncef Balamane (ALG)	2:16.98	Ramzi Chouchar (ALG)	2:17.31
50m Butterfly	Jaouad Syoud (ALG)	24.04	Yousif Bu Arish (KSA)	24.90	Youcef Bouzouia (ALG)	24.91
100m Butterfly	Jaouad Syoud (ALG)	53.58	Ziyad Al Salous (JOR)	55.23	Fares Benzidoun (ALG)	55.38
200m Butterfly	Jaouad Syoud (ALG)	1:59.38	Fares Benzidoun (ALG)	2:03.98	Heni Mesfar (TUN)	2:08.39
200m Individual Medley	Jaouad Syoud (ALG)	2:04.07	Moncef Balamane (ALG)	2:06.01	Amro Al-Wir (JOR)	2:06.85
400m Individual Medley	Jaouad Syoud (ALG)	4:25.34	Ramzi Chouchar (ALG)	4:27.87	Osama Trabulsi (SYR)	4:35.69
4 × 100 m Freestyle Relay	Algeria (ALG); Jaouad Syoud; Akram Amine Ammar; Fares Benzidoun; Moncef Balamane	3:27.13	Jordan (JOR); Mohammed Bedour; Emad Zapen; Adnan Al Abdallat; Ziyad Al Salous	3:28.03	Tunisia (TUN); Mohamed Khalil Ben Chaabane; Mohamed Khalil Ben Ajmia; Mohamed Ali Chaouachi; Adnan Beji	3:31.62
4 × 200 m Freestyle Relay	Algeria (ALG); Fares Benzidoun; Mohamed Djaballah; Moncef Balamane; Sofiane Achour Talet	7:41.97	Tunisia (TUN); Mohamed Khalil Ben Chaabane; Rami Rahmouni; Mohamed Khalil Ben Ajmia; Mohamed Ali Chaouachi	7:49.39	Saudi Arabia (KSA); Mohammed Almaher; Ahmed Alhashim; Ali Alessa; Yousif Bu Arish	7:50.03
4 × 100 m Medley Relay	Algeria (ALG); Abdellah Ardjoune; Jaouad Syoud; Fares Benzidoun; Moncef Balamane	3:45.59	Jordan (JOR); Mohammed Bedour; Laith Sabbah; Amro Al-Wir; Ziyad Al Salous	3:46.92	Saudi Arabia (KSA); Mohammed Almaher; Ahmed Alhashim; Ali Alessa; Yousif Bu Arish	4:17.84

=== Women ===
Event	Gold		Silver		Bronze	
50m Freestyle	Amel Melih (ALG)	25.66	Nesrine Medjahed (ALG)	26.46	Amani Alobaidli (BHR)	26.74
100m Freestyle	Amel Melih (ALG)	55.87	Goana Reyes (SYR)	56.56	Nesrine Medjahed (ALG)	57.03
200m Freestyle	Nesrine Medjahed (ALG)	2:06.03	Majda Chebaraka (ALG)	2:07.83	Jamila Boulakbech (TUN)	2:10.78
400m Freestyle	Goana Reyes (SYR)	4:23.46	Jamila Boulakbech (TUN)	4:30.21	Majda Chebaraka (ALG)	4.31.81
800m Freestyle	Goana Reyes (SYR)	9:11.20	Jamila Boulakbech (TUN)	9:16.87	Elaa Ben Milad (TUN)	9:29.37
50m Backstroke	Amel Melih (ALG)	29.28	Amani Alobaidli (BHR)	29.64	Valerie Tarazi (PLE)	29.78
100m Backstroke	Valerie Tarazi (PLE)	1:04.22	Amani Alobaidli (BHR)	1:05.06	Imene Kawthar Zitouni (ALG)	1:06.35
200m Backstroke	Imene Kawthar Zitouni (ALG)	2:22.68	Jihane Benchadli (ALG)	2:24.64	Amani Alobaidli (BHR)	2:25.16
50m Breaststroke	Valerie Tarazi (PLE)	32.79	Habiba Belghith (TUN)	33.55	Nesrine Medjahed (ALG)	33.65
100m Breaststroke	Hamida Rania Nefsi (ALG)	1:12.17	Valerie Tarazi (PLE)	1:13.24	Habiba Belghith (TUN)	1:13.69
200m Breaststroke	Hamida Rania Nefsi (ALG)	2:33.33	Valerie Tarazi (PLE)	2:38.67	Leen Aiash (SYR)	2:40.86
50m Butterfly	Amel Melih (ALG)	27.15	Valerie Tarazi (PLE)	27.65	Nesrine Medjahed (ALG)	27.66
100m Butterfly	Nesrine Medjahed (ALG)	1:01.22	Imene Kawthar Zitouni (ALG)	1:03.92	Ameni Souidi (TUN)	1:06.28
200m Butterfly	Jihane Benchadli (ALG)	2:25.95	Lilia Sihem Midouni (ALG)	2:27.03	Ameni Souidi (TUN)	2:35.31
200m Individual Medley	Hamida Rania Nefsi (ALG)	2:19.89	Jihane Benchadli (ALG)	2:27.38	Habiba Belghith (TUN)	2:29.98
400m Individual Medley	Hamida Rania Nefsi (ALG)	5:00.33	Imene Kawthar Zitouni (ALG)	5:09.65	Habiba Belghith (TUN)	5:21.47

=== Mixed ===
Games	Gold		Silver		Bronze	
4 × 100 m Freestyle Relay	Algeria (ALG); Jaouad Syoud; Fares Benzidoun; Amel Melih; Nesrine Medjahed	3:37.48	Syria (SYR); Enas Sorkine; Laith Lakmoosh; Omar Abbas; Goana Reyes	3:46.17	Tunisia (TUN); Habiba Belghith; Mohamed Ali Chaouachi; Adnan Beji; Ameni Souidi	3:47.30
4 × 100 m Medley Relay	Algeria (ALG); Jaouad Syoud; Akram Amine Ammar; Amel Melih; Nesrine Medjahed	3:59.69	Tunisia (TUN); Habiba Belghith; Mohamed Khalil Ben Ajmia; Adnan Beji; Ameni Souidi	4:11.51	Syria (SYR); Enas Sorkine; Laith Lakmoosh; Omar Abbas; Goana Reyes	4:11.87

== Medal standings ==
* Host nation (Algeria)

2023 Arab Games swimming medal table
Rank	NOC	Gold	Silver	Bronze	Total
1	Algeria (ALG)*	23	14	14	51
2	Jordan (JOR)	4	7	2	13
3	Syria (SYR)	4	3	3	10
4	Palestine (PLE)	4	3	1	8
5	Tunisia (TUN)	2	7	11	20
6	Bahrain (BHR)	0	2	3	5
7	Saudi Arabia (KSA)	0	1	3	4
Totals (7 entries)		37	37	37	111
