= Tarazi (surname) =

Tarazi or Al-Tarazi (Arabic: ترزي ، آل ترزي) is a Palestinian Christian surname from Gaza. The Tarazi family are a prominent Christian clan and are renowned in the Levant region. The name is mostly found in Palestine, along with other middle eastern countries such as Syria, Lebanon, Türkiye and Jordan.

- Michael Tarazi, Palestinian-American lawyer and former adviser to the Palestine Liberation Organization
- Philippe de Tarrazi (1865–1956), Lebanese polymath, philanthropist, founder of the National Library of Lebanon, and a founding member of the Arab Academy of Damascus
- Zuhdi Tarazi, first Ambassador, Permanent Observer of Palestine to the United Nations
- Leila Tarazi Fawaz, Lebanese historian and academician
- Valerie Tarazi, American swimmer
- Hana Tarazi, Palestinian technocrat in the National Committee for the Administration of Gaza

Fictional characters:

- Zari Tarazi, in Legends of Tomorrow
- Behrad Tarazi, in Legends of Tomorrow
