= Miloud Hadefi Complex Aquatic Center =

Swimming venue in Tokyo, Japan

Coordinates: 35.7304°N 0.5453°W

- Interactive map of Miloud Hadefi Complex Aquatic Center
- Full name: Miloud Hadefi Olympic Complex Aquatic Center
- Location: Bir El Djir, Oran, Algeria
- Owner: OPOW Oran
- Capacity: 3,000

Construction
- Opened: 2022

The Miloud Hadefi Olympic Complex Aquatic Center is an aquatics venue located in Bir El Djir, Oran, Algeria. It hosted the Swimming and the Water polo tournaments during the 2022 Mediterranean Games.

== Notable events ==
The Aquatic Center hosts many international tournaments :

- 2022 Mediterranean Games (Swimming and Water polo)
- 2022 Arab Swimming Championships
- 2023 Arab Games (Swimming)
- 2026 African Swimming Championships

== See also ==
- Miloud Hadefi Stadium
- Miloud Hadefi Complex Omnisport Arena
