= Gymnastics at the 2023 Arab Games =

- Venue: Miloud Hadefi Complex Omnisport Arena
- Location: Bir El Djir, Oran, Algeria
- Dates: 7–10 July

At the 2023 Arab Games, the gymnastics (Artistic) events were held at Miloud Hadefi Complex Omnisport Arena in Bir El Djir, Oran, Algeria from 7 to 10 July. A total of 13 events were contested.

== Medal table ==
* Host nation (Algeria)

2023 Gymnastics Arab Games medal table
Rank	NOC	Gold	Silver	Bronze	Total
1	Algeria (ALG)*	6	5	5	16
2	Syria (SYR)	4	2	5	11
3	Jordan (JOR)	2	0	0	2
4	Morocco (MAR)	1	6	2	9
5	Qatar (QAT)	0	0	2	2
Totals (5 entries)		13	13	14	40

=== Men ===
Event	Gold		Silver		Bronze	
All-Around	Lais Najjar (SYR)	78,267	Hamza Hossaini (MAR)	77,334	Abderrazak Nasser (MAR)	76,667
Team	Algeria	231,766	Morocco	230,134	Syria	210,134
Pommel Horse	Ahmad Abu Al-Soud (JOR)	14,200	Zakariae Setti (MAR)	13,500	Rakan Al-Harith (QAT)	13,400
Rings	Hillal Metidji (ALG)	13,400	Hamza Hossaini (MAR)	13,067	Bilal Bellaoui (ALG)	12,667
Floor Exercise	Lais Najjar (SYR)	13,400	Hamza Hossaini (MAR)	13,300	Acheraf Quistas (MAR)	13,200
Horizontal Bar	Ahmed-Riadh Aliouat (ALG)	13,003	Lais Najjar (SYR)	12,967	H'mida Djaber (ALG)	12,400
Vault	Hamza Hossaini (MAR)	13,800	Housse Eddine Hamadouche (ALG)	13,700	Lais Najjar (SYR)	13,566
Parallel Bars	Ahmed-Riadh Aliouat (ALG)	13,467	Hamza Hossaini (MAR)	13,000	Lais Najjar (SYR)	12,667

=== Women ===
Event	Gold		Silver		Bronze	
All-Around	Aleksandra Maksimova (SYR)	49,233	Boukhatem Fatma Zohra (ALG)	45,700	Salem Lahna (ALG)	44,733
Vault	Ruba Osama Hamza Aldaoud (JOR)	12,767	Aleksandra Maksimova (SYR)	12,533	Sihem Hamidi (ALG)	12,450
Uneven Bars	Aleksandra Maksimova (SYR)	12,267	Salem Lahna (ALG)	10,400	Boukhatem Fatma Zohra (ALG) Ahmed Salma (QAT)	8,067
Balance Beam	Lahna Salem (ALG)	11,733	Sihem Hamidi (ALG)	10,867	Aleksandra Maksimova (SYR)	8,767
Floor Exercise	Malek Rezagui (ALG)	11,567	Boukhatem Fatma Zohra (ALG)	10,967	Aleksandra Maksimova (SYR)	10,633

== Participating nations ==
- Algeria (11)
- Syria (5)
- Morocco (5)
- Qatar (5)
- Jordan (4)
