= Yazan Al-Bawwab =

Palestinian swimmer (born 1999)

Personal information
- National team: Palestine
- Citizenship: Palestinian; Italian
- Born: 30 October 1999 (age 27) Saudi Arabia
- Education: Carleton University; University of London

Sport
- Sport: Swimming
Medal record
Men's swimming
Representing Palestine
Arab Games
Gold medal – first place	2023 Algeria	50 m backstroke
Gold medal – first place	2023 Algeria	100 m backstroke
- Updated on 29 July 2024

Yazan Al-Bawwab OLY (Arabic: يزن البواب; born 30 October 1999) is a Saudi-born Palestinian and Italian swimmer. He competed for Palestine at the 2020 Tokyo Olympics and the 2024 Paris Olympics.

== Early and personal life ==
Al-Bawwab was born in Saudi Arabia to Palestinian parents with Italian citizenship, which they acquired after a long stay in the country: his father Rashad had moved to Genoa as a refugee and had graduated in engineering at the local university. Al-Bawwab thus holds dual Palestinian and Italian citizenship, and calls himself "half Italian". He grew up in Dubai, United Emirates, where his father had opened a furniture business. Al-Bawwab lived in Ottawa, Canada, where he graduated in aerospace and mechanical engineering from Carleton University, and currently lives in the Netherlands, while pursuing a master's degree in international sports management at the University of London.

== Swimming career ==
Al-Bawwab was one of five Palestinians who represented Palestine in the 2020 Tokyo Olympics in 2021. He competed in the men's 100 metre freestyle, coming in 66th out of 71 swimmers.

As of 2021, he held the Palestinian record in both the 50 and 100 metre freestyle events. He is also the Arab champion in the 50 and 100 metre backstroke after winning both events at the 2023 Arab Games.

He was selected to compete at the 2024 Paris Olympics in the 100 metre backstroke, where he finished 43rd out of 46 in the heats.

== Other ventures ==
As of 2023, Al-Bawwab was an IOC Young Leader and a FISU ambassador for Canada; he is a member of the Palestine Olympic Committee Athletes' Commission and the founder of the Palestinian Olympians Association. In late 2023, he launched the SwimHope Palestine project, aimed at providing young children in Palestinian refugee communities with basic swimming and life-saving skills.
