= Valerie Tarazi =

Palestinian-American swimmer (born 1999)

Valerie Tarazi OLY
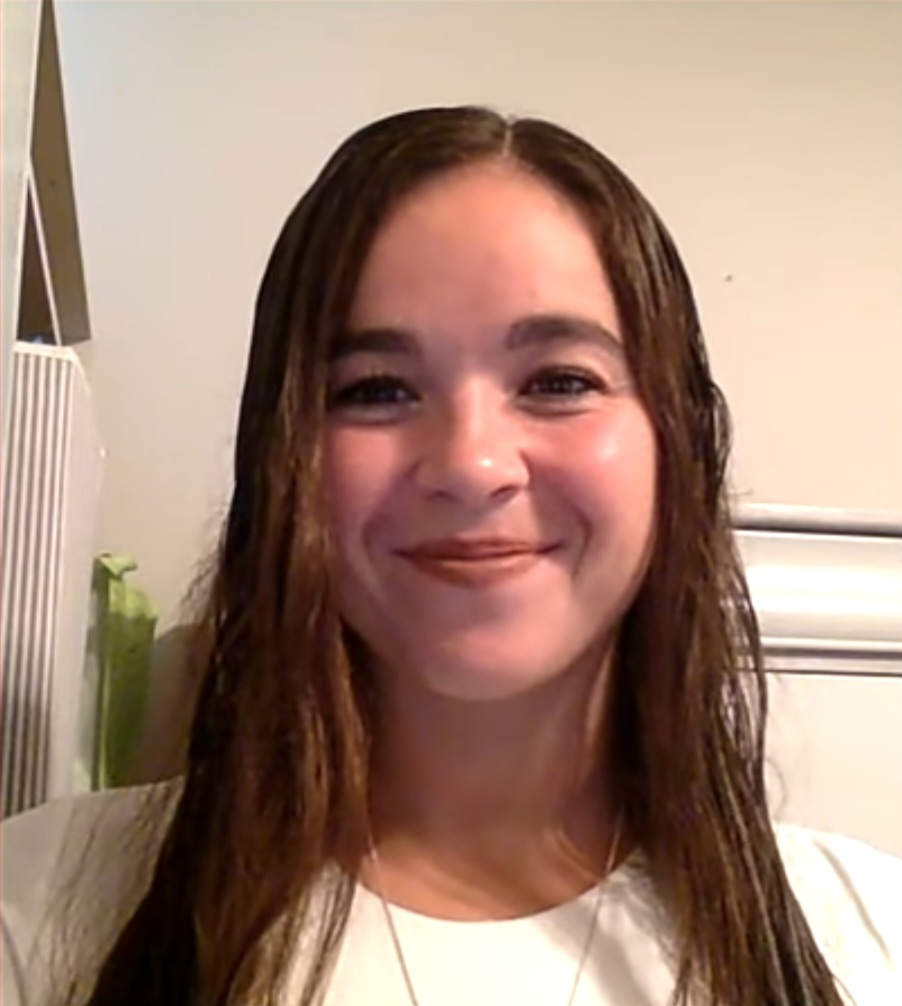
- Tarazi in 2024

Personal information
- Full name: Valerie Rose Tarazi
- Nationality: American; Palestinian
- Born: 9 October 1999 (age 27) Illinois, U.S.
- Education: Auburn University

Sport
- Country: Palestine
- Sport: Swimming

Achievements and titles
- Personal best: 200m medley: 2:20.56 (2024)
Medal record
Representing Palestine
Islamic Solidarity Games
Bronze medal – third place	2025 Riyadh	200m medley
Arab Games
Gold medal – first place	2023 Oran	100m backstroke
Silver medal – second place	2023 Oran	100m breaststroke
Silver medal – second place	2023 Oran	200m breaststroke
Bronze medal – third place	2023 Oran	50m backstroke

Valerie Rose Tarazi OLY (Arabic: فاليري روز ترزي; born 9 October 1999) is a Palestinian-American swimmer who represents Palestine internationally. She competed in the 2024 Summer Olympics.

== Life and career ==
Tarazi was born in Illinois, U.S., to an Orthodox Christian family originating from Gaza, where she has relatives (the Tarazis are one of the largest Christian clans in Gaza). She grew up in her birth state, graduating from Prairie Ridge High School in Crystal Lake and then Auburn University in Alabama. She took up swimming at the age of 3.

She participated in the 2023 Arab Games held in Algeria, and won two gold, three silver, and one bronze medal, making her the highest yielding medalist at the Games. She holds the Palestinian record in the 50m and 100m backstroke, 50m, 100m, and 200m breaststroke, and the 50m butterfly. She competed for Palestine at the 2024 Summer Olympics in Paris, in the 200m medley, also serving as national flagbearer at the opening ceremony alongside boxer Wasim Abusal, as well as at the closing ceremony alongside taekwondo practitioner Omar Yaser Ismail.

After competing at the 2025 World Aquatics Championships in Singapore, Tarazi represented her country in the swimming events at the 6th Islamic Solidarity Games in Riyadh, Saudi Arabia, in November 2025. She won the bronze medal in the 200m medley event.
