= Yamina Halata =

Algerian judoka (born 1991)

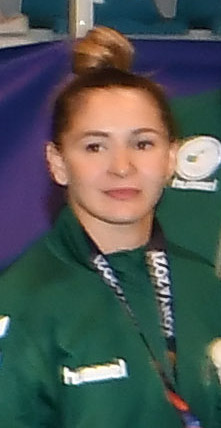

Personal information
- Born: 4 September 1991 (age 34)
- Occupation: Judoka

Sport
- Country: Algeria
- Sport: Judo
- Weight class: –57 kg

Achievements and titles
- African Champ.: (gold) (2022)
Medal record
Women's judo
Representing Algeria
African Games
Silver medal – second place	2019 Rabat	–57 kg
African Championships
Gold medal – first place	2022 Oran	–57 kg
Bronze medal – third place	2019 Cape Town	–57 kg
Bronze medal – third place	2021 Dakar	–57 kg
Islamic Solidarity Games
Silver medal – second place	2021 Konya	–57 kg
Bronze medal – third place	2021 Konya	Women's team
Arab Games
Gold medal – first place	2023 Algiers	–57 kg
Gold medal – first place	2023 Algiers	Women's team

Profile at external databases
- IJF: 42779
- JudoInside.com: 116351
- Updated on 29 May 2022

Yamina Halata (born 4 September 1991) is an Algerian judoka. She is a silver medalist at the African Games. She won the gold medal in her event at the 2022 African Judo Championships held in Oran, Algeria.

== Career ==
In 2019, she won one of the bronze medals in the women's 57 kg event at the African Judo Championships held in Cape Town, South Africa.

At the 2021 African Judo Championships held in Dakar, Senegal, she also won one of the bronze medals in her event.

She lost her bronze medal match in the women's 57 kg event at the 2022 Mediterranean Games held in Oran, Algeria.

== Achievements ==
Year	Tournament	Place	Weight class
2019	African Championships	3rd	−57 kg
2019	African Games	2nd	−57 kg
2020	African Championships	2nd	−57 kg
2022	African Championships	1st	−57 kg
