= Faïza Aissahine =

Algerian judoka (born 1993)

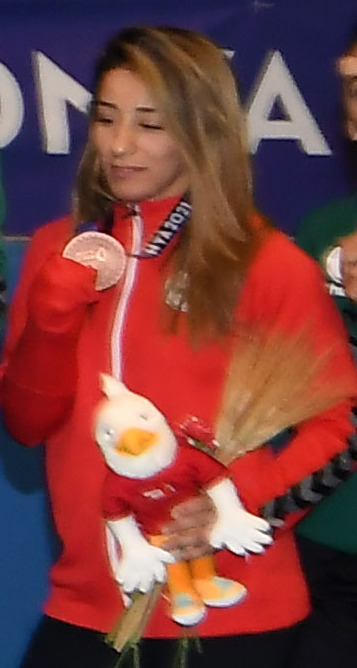

Personal information
- Born: 20 July 1993 (age 33)
- Occupation: Judoka

Sport
- Country: Algeria
- Sport: Judo
- Weight class: ‍–‍52 kg

Achievements and titles
- World Champ.: R32 (2022)
- African Champ.: (gold) (2022)
Medal record
Women's judo
Representing Algeria
African Games
Gold medal – first place	2019 Rabat	‍–‍52 kg
Silver medal – second place	2023 Accra	Mixed team
African Championships
Gold medal – first place	2022 Oran	‍–‍52 kg
Silver medal – second place	2023 Casablanca	‍–‍52 kg
Silver medal – second place	2025 Abidjan	‍–‍52 kg
Bronze medal – third place	2016 Tunis	‍–‍52 kg
Bronze medal – third place	2017 Antananarivo	‍–‍52 kg
Bronze medal – third place	2018 Tunis	‍–‍52 kg
Bronze medal – third place	2024 Cairo	‍–‍52 kg
Islamic Solidarity Games
Bronze medal – third place	2021 Konya	Women's team
Arab Games
Gold medal – first place	2023 Algiers	Women's team
Silver medal – second place	2023 Algiers	‍–‍52 kg

Profile at external databases
- IJF: 13156
- JudoInside.com: 58382
- Updated on 27 April 2025

Faiza Aissahine (born 20 July 1993) is a judoka who competes internationally for Algeria. She is a gold medalist at the African Games.

== Achievements ==
Aissahine won the African Open in Yaounde in 2018 U52kg. She won a gold medal at the African Games in Rabat in 2019 and also the African Championship 2022.

Aissahine has won two gold medals in continental championships, and two in continental open. She has won silver at an international tournament and has also won 5 bronze in total.

She lost her bronze medal match in the women's 52 kg event at the 2022 Mediterranean Games held in Oran, Algeria.
