= Lais Najjar =

Syrian-American artistic gymnast

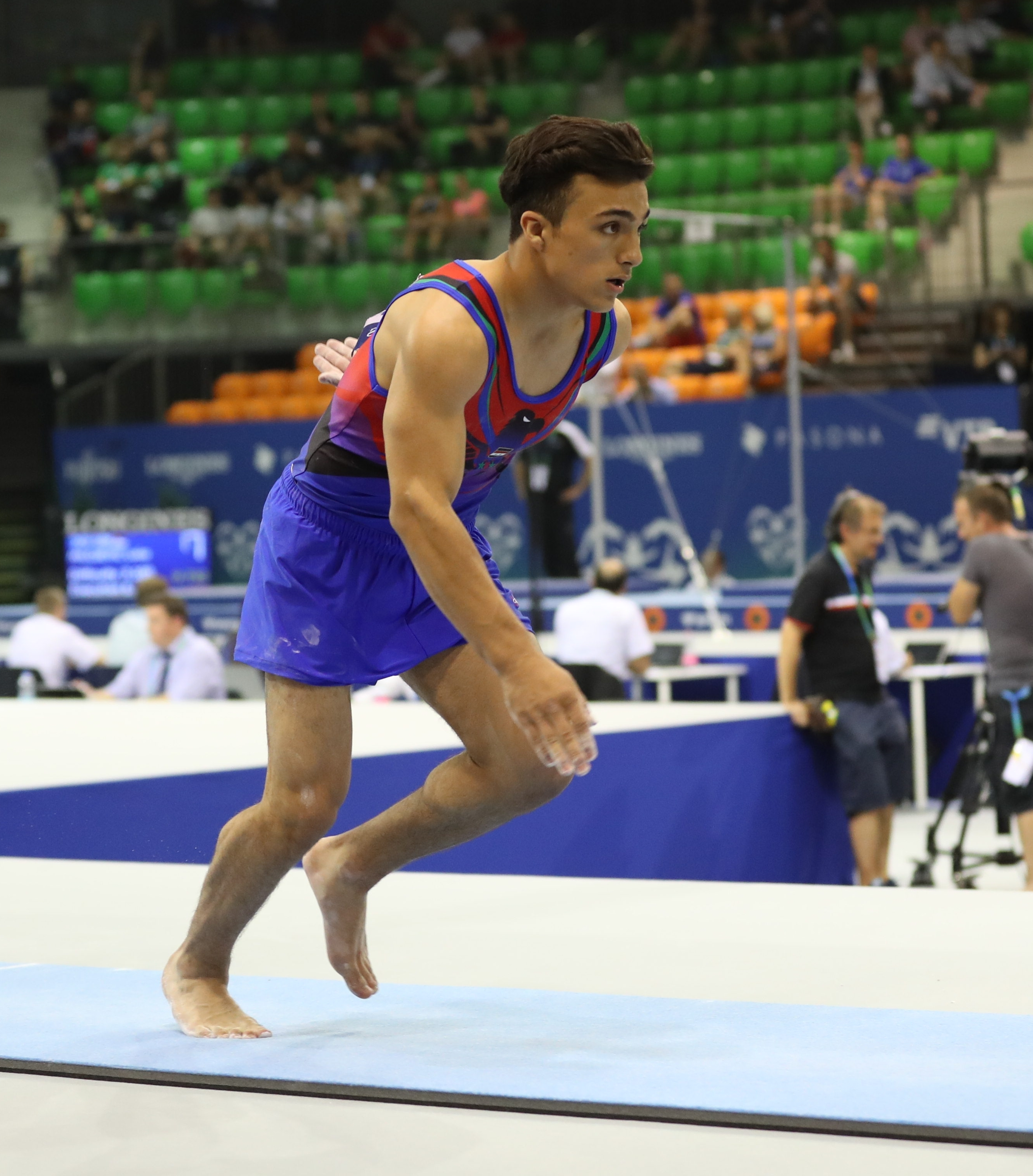
- Najjar at the 2019 Junior World Championships

Personal information
- Full name: Lais Najjar
- Born: 8 October 2002 (age 23) Chicago, Illinois, USA

Gymnastics career
- Discipline: Men's artistic gymnastics
- Country represented: Syria; (2016–2024)
- College team: Michigan Wolverines (2022–2025)
- Head coach: Yuan Xiao
Medal record
Men's artistic gymnastics
Representing Syria
Arab Games
Gold medal – first place	2023 Oran	All-around
Gold medal – first place	2023 Oran	Floor exercise
Silver medal – second place	2023 Oran	Horizontal bar
Bronze medal – third place	2023 Oran	Team
Bronze medal – third place	2023 Oran	Vault
Bronze medal – third place	2023 Oran	Parallel bars
FIG World Cup
Event / 1st / 2nd / 3rd; World Challenge Cup / 0 / 1 / 0
Representing the Michigan Wolverines
NCAA Championships
Silver medal – second place	2023 State College	Team
Silver medal – second place	2024 Columbus	Team
Bronze medal – third place	2022 Norman	Team

Lais Najjar (born October 8, 2002) is a Syrian-American artistic gymnast. He represented Syria at the 2024 Olympic Games.

== Personal life ==
Najjar was born in Chicago, Illinois in 2002 to Chirin Chahkhachiro and Maher Najjar. He spent much of his childhood living in Syria while his father, a pulmonologist, traveled back and forth between the two locations. Prior to the start of the Syrian civil war, Najjar and his family moved back to the United States, where they would have better access to educational opportunities for himself and his two sisters. Najjar attended Hinsdale Central High School and competed for the University of Michigan Wolverines men's gymnastics team.

== Gymnastics career ==
Najjar competed at the inaugural Junior World Championships in floor exercise and vault. He did not qualify for any individual event finals.

Najjar made his senior-level debut at the Cairo World Challenge Cup, where he won silver on vault, behind Nazar Chepurnyi. In 2022 Najjar began competing in NCAA gymnastics for the Michigan Wolverines. Later that year he competed at the Asian Championships, Mediterranean Games and World Championships.

Najjar competed at the 2024 Asian Championships, where he placed 17th in the all-around. In late May, Najjar was awarded the Tripartite invitation to compete at the 2024 Olympic Games in Paris.

== Competitive history ==
Year	Event	Team	AA	FX	PH	SR	VT	PB	HB
2017
2017	Junior Asian Championships		17						
2019
2019	Junior World Championships			42					
2021	Elite Team Cup	4							
2021	Cairo World Challenge Cup			7			2nd place, silver medalist(s)		
2022	NCAA Championships	3rd place, bronze medalist(s)							
2022	Asian Championships	13	17						
2022	Mediterranean Games		19				5		
2022	World Championships		49						
2023	NCAA Championships	2nd place, silver medalist(s)							
2023	Asian Championships		21						
2023	Arab Games	3rd place, bronze medalist(s)	1st place, gold medalist(s)	1st place, gold medalist(s)			3rd place, bronze medalist(s)	3rd place, bronze medalist(s)	2nd place, silver medalist(s)
2024	NCAA Championships	2nd place, silver medalist(s)							
2024	Asian Championships		17						
2024	Olympic Games			51				47	54
