= Meriem Mebarki =

Algerian fencer (born 2003)

Personal information
- Nationality: Algerian
- Born: 22 June 2003 (age 23)

Sport
- Sport: Fencing

Meriem Mebarki (born 22 June 2003) is an Algerian fencer. She competed in the women's foil event at the 2020 Summer Olympics. She finished in 33rd place, after losing to Flóra Pásztor of Hungary in the Round of 64.
