= Palestine at the 2023 Arab Games =

- IOC code: PLE
- NOC: Palestine Olympic Committee

in Algeria
- Medals: Gold 4 Silver 4 Bronze 8 Total 16

Arab Games appearances
- 1953; 1957; 1961; 1965; 1976; 1985; 1992; 1997; 1999; 2004; 2007; 2011; 2023; 2027

Palestine participated in the 2023 Arab Games, which were held in Algeria from 5 to 15 July 2023. The country sent delegations to appear in 12 sports. Palestine has taken part in every edition since 1953, except for the 1957 edition in Beirut due to force majeure.

== Medalists ==
Medal	Name	Sport	Event	Date
Gold	Valerie Tarazi	Swimming	Women's 50m Breaststroke	5 July
Gold	Yazan Al-Bawwab	Swimming	Men's 100m Backstroke	5 July
Gold	Valerie Tarazi	Swimming	Women's 100m Backstroke	5 July
Silver	Valerie Tarazi	Swimming	Women's 50m Butterfly	7 July
Gold	Yazan Al-Bawwab	Swimming	Men's 50m Backstroke	7 July
Silver	Valerie Tarazi	Swimming	Women's 100m Breaststroke	7 July
Bronze	Valerie Tarazi	Swimming	Women's 50m Backstroke	8 July
Bronze	Jenin Zeynab Heck	Boxing	Women's -60 kg	9 July
Bronze	Wasim Abusal	Boxing	Men's -57 kg	9 July
Bronze	Marwa Al Farra; Shahd Al Khateeb; Rawan Safi	Bowls	Pétanque - Women's Triples	9 July
Bronze	Zuhoor Al Khateeb; Hatem Al Najjar	Bowls	Raffa - Mixed Doubles	10 July
Bronze	Nisreen Al Khateeb; Zuhour Bashir	Bowls	Raffa - Women's Doubles	10 July
Bronze	Rawan Safi	Bowls	Pétanque - Women's Precision Shooting	10 July
Silver	Valerie Tarazi	Swimming	Women's 200m Breaststroke	10 July
Bronze	Abdullah Assaf	Wrestling	Men's Freestyle 61 kg	11 July
Silver	Hala Al-Qadi	Karate	Women's Kumite -68 kg	14 July

== Sports ==
=== Basketball ===
Pos	Team	Pld	W	L	PF	PA	PD	Pts
1	Tunisia	0	0	0	0	0	0	0
2	Jordan	0	0	0	0	0	0	0
3	Palestine	0	0	0	0	0	0	0
4	Algeria	0	0	0	0	0	0	0

First match(es) will be played: 13 July 2023. Source:

=== Football ===
Pos	Team	Pld	W	D	L	GF	GA	GD	Pts	Qualification
1	Syria	3	1	2	0	5	3	+2	5	Advance to semi-finals
2	Saudi Arabia U19	3	1	2	0	4	3	+1	5	Advance to semi-finals
3	Palestine	3	0	2	1	2	3	−1	2	
4	Mauritania	3	0	2	1	4	6	−2	2	

Source: GSA
2 July 2023
21:00

Palestine	1–1	Mauritania
Rabei 5'	Report	Elwely 24'

Mohamed Hamlaoui Stadium, Constantine
Referee: Abdemoumene Touabti (Algeria)

5 July 2023
17:30

Syria	0–0	Palestine
	Report

Mohamed Hamlaoui Stadium, Constantine
Referee: Mohamed Khaled (Bahrain)

8 July 2023
17:30

Saudi Arabia U19	2–1	Palestine
Al-Abdulwahed 37'; Al-Hassan 62'	Report	Bani Odeh 40'

Mohamed Hamlaoui Stadium, Constantine
Referee: Nabil Boukhalfa (Algeria)

=== Volleyball ===
Pos	Team	Pld	W	L	Pts	SW	SL	SR	SPW	SPL	SPR	Qualification
1	Algeria	1	1	0	3	3	0	MAX	75	35	2.143	Final round
2	Libya	2	2	0	6	6	0	MAX	154	103	1.495	Final round
3	Qatar	2	1	1	3	3	3	1.000	134	140	0.957	Final round
4	Jordan	3	1	2	3	3	6	0.500	136	211	0.645	Final round
5	Palestine	2	0	2	0	0	6	0.000	140	225	0.622	

Date	Time	Venue		Score		Set 1	Set 2	Set 3	Set 4	Set 5	Total	Report
6 Jul			Algeria	3–0	Palestine	25–13	25–11	25–11			75–35	
7 Jul	16:00		Jordan	3–0	Palestine	25–19	25–21	25–21			75–61	
9 Jul			Libya	3–0	Palestine	25–19	25–10	25–15			75–44	
