= 2023 Arab Games =

International multi-sport event

13th Arab Sports Games
- Official logo
- Host city: Algiers, Oran, Constantine, Annaba, Tipaza
- Nations: 22
- Athletes: 3,800
- Sport: 22
- Opening: 5 July 2023
- Closing: 15 July 2023
- Opened by: Aymen Benabderrahmane
- Main venue: Stade du 5 Juillet
- Website: Arab Games 2023

The 2023 Arab Sports Games (Arabic: الألعاب الرياضية العربية 2023) was the 13th edition of the Arab Games, an international multi-sport event which took place in Algeria, between 5 and 15 July 2023. The event included 22 sports with all 22 members of the Arab League participating. For the first time, five cities hosted the games: Algiers, Oran, Constantine, Annaba and Tipaza.

== Host selection ==
Algeria was chosen as the host on 14 March 2023 during a meeting of the Executive Bureau of the Union of Arab National Olympic Committees, in Jeddah, Saudi Arabia.

== Venues ==
Stade du 5 Juillet hosted the opening and closing ceremonies

Five cities hosted the games, Algiers the capital, Oran the second city, Constantine, Annaba and Tipaza.

City	Venue	Capacity	Events
Algiers (10+2 events)	Stade du 5 Juillet	64,200	Opening & closing ceremonies
Algiers (10+2 events)	ESHRA Ain Benian Hall		Badminton
Algiers (10+2 events)	Ouagnouni Stadium		Basketball 3x3
Algiers (10+2 events)	Ben Aknoun Military Center Hall		Boxing
Algiers (10+2 events)	Ben Aknoun Women's Center Hall		Fencing
Algiers (10+2 events)	La Coupole Arena	5,500	Judo
Algiers (10+2 events)	La Coupole Arena	5,500	Karate
Algiers (10+2 events)	La Coupole Arena	5,500	Wrestling
Algiers (10+2 events)	Les Sablettes Park	–	Sailing
Algiers (10+2 events)	Hacène Harcha Arena; El Biar Multisports Hall	8,000	Volleyball
Algiers (10+2 events)	Bordj El Kiffan Multisports Hall		Weightlifting
Algiers (10+2 events)	Staouali Multisports Hall		Wheelchair Basketball
Algiers (10+2 events)	Hydra Multisports Hall		Goalball
Oran (5+1 events)	Miloud Hadefi Stadium	40,143	Athletics
Oran (5+1 events)	LOFA Sports Complex	500	Boules
Oran (5+1 events)	Miloud Hadefi Complex Omnisport Arena	7,000	Gymnastics
Oran (5+1 events)	Miloud Hadefi Complex Omnisport Arena	7,000	Handball
Oran (5+1 events)	Hamou Boutlélis Sports Palace	5,000	Handball
Oran (5+1 events)	Miloud Hadefi Complex Aquatic Center	3,000	Swimming
Oran (5+1 events)	Miloud Hadefi Stadium	40,143	Para-athletics
Constantine (2 events)	Constantine Military Complex Hall		Chess
Constantine (2 events)	Mohamed Hamlaoui Stadium	22,986	Football
Annaba (1 event)	19 May 1956 Stadium	58,100	Football
Tipaza (2 events)	Tipaza Urban Circuit	–	Cycling
Tipaza (2 events)	Tipaza Multisports Hall		Table tennis

== Sports ==
22 sports are chosen in the games.

- Athletics (43)
- Badminton (5)
- Basketball 3x3 (2)
- Boxing (21)
- Boules (17)
- Chess (6)
- Cycling (8)
- Fencing (12)
- Football (1)
- Gymnastics (13)
- Handball (1)
- Judo (16)
- Karate (14)
- Sailing (8)
- Swimming (37)
- Table tennis (7)
- Volleyball (2)
- Weightlifting (20)
- Wrestling (20)

=== Demonstration sports ===
- Athletics (30) () (Para-athletics)
- Basketball (2) () (Wheelchair Basketball)
- Goalball (1) ()

== Participation ==
The 22 countries constituting the members of the Arab League participate in the games, with 3800 athletes.

- Algeria (454)
- Bahrain (103)
- Comoros
- Djibouti
- Egypt (9)
- Iraq (194)
- Jordan
- Kuwait
- Lebanon
- Libya (49)
- Mauritania
- Morocco (93)
- Oman
- Palestine (134)
- Qatar (104)
- Saudi Arabia
- Somalia
- Sudan
- Syria (105)
- Tunisia (195)
- United Arab Emirates (131)
- Yemen

== Opening ceremony ==
The opening ceremony of the 15th Arab Games took place on July 5th, coinciding with the country's Independence Day. It began at 9 p.m. at the Stade du 5 Juillet with the national anthem "Kassaman", followed by the parade of delegations. The Prime Minister, on behalf of the President, kicked off the event, emphasizing Algeria's efforts to bring together the Arab world. An artistic performance showcasing Algerian culture followed, and then the sporting events commenced. Distinguished guests, including representatives from the Arab League, attended the event.

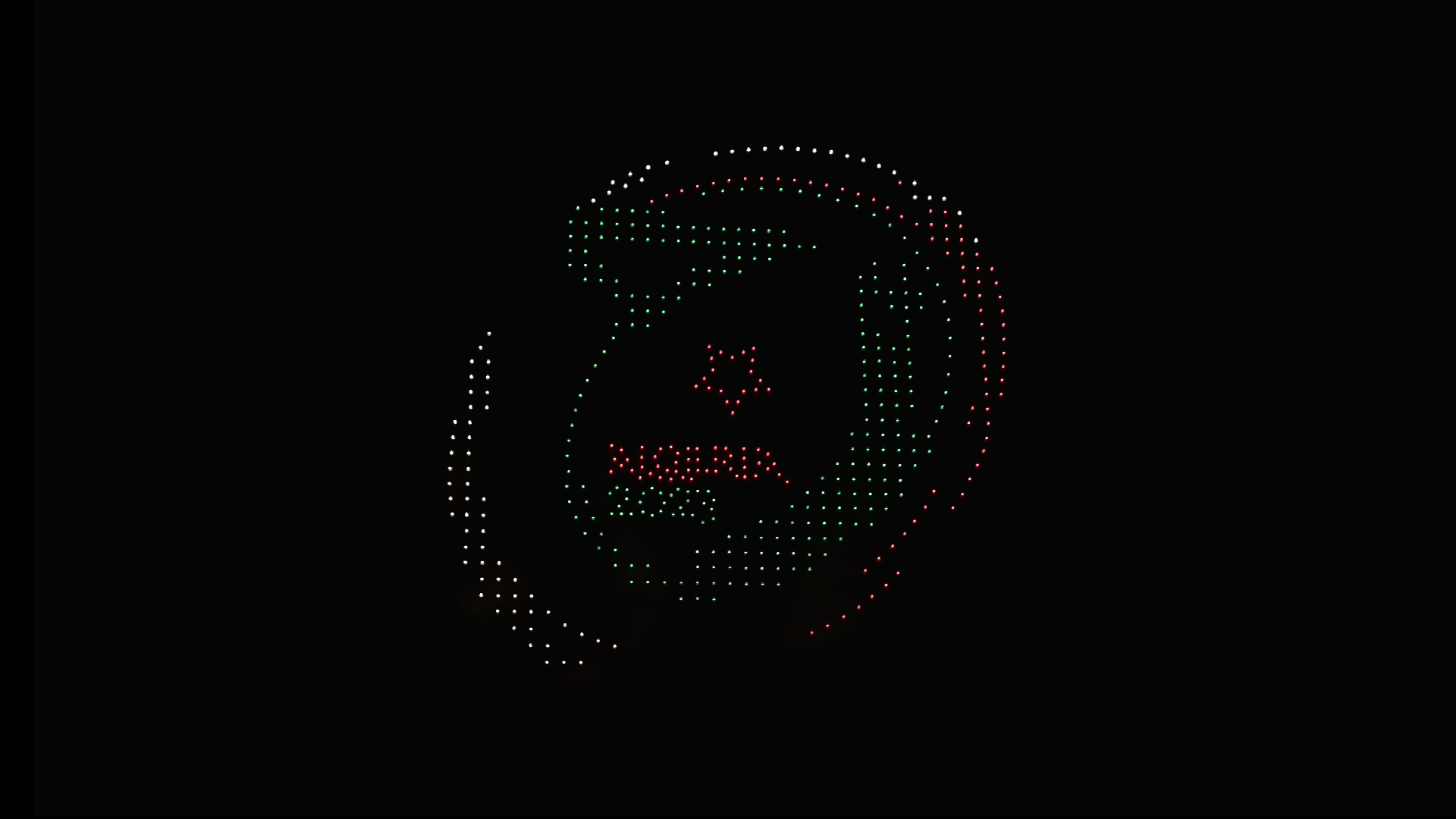

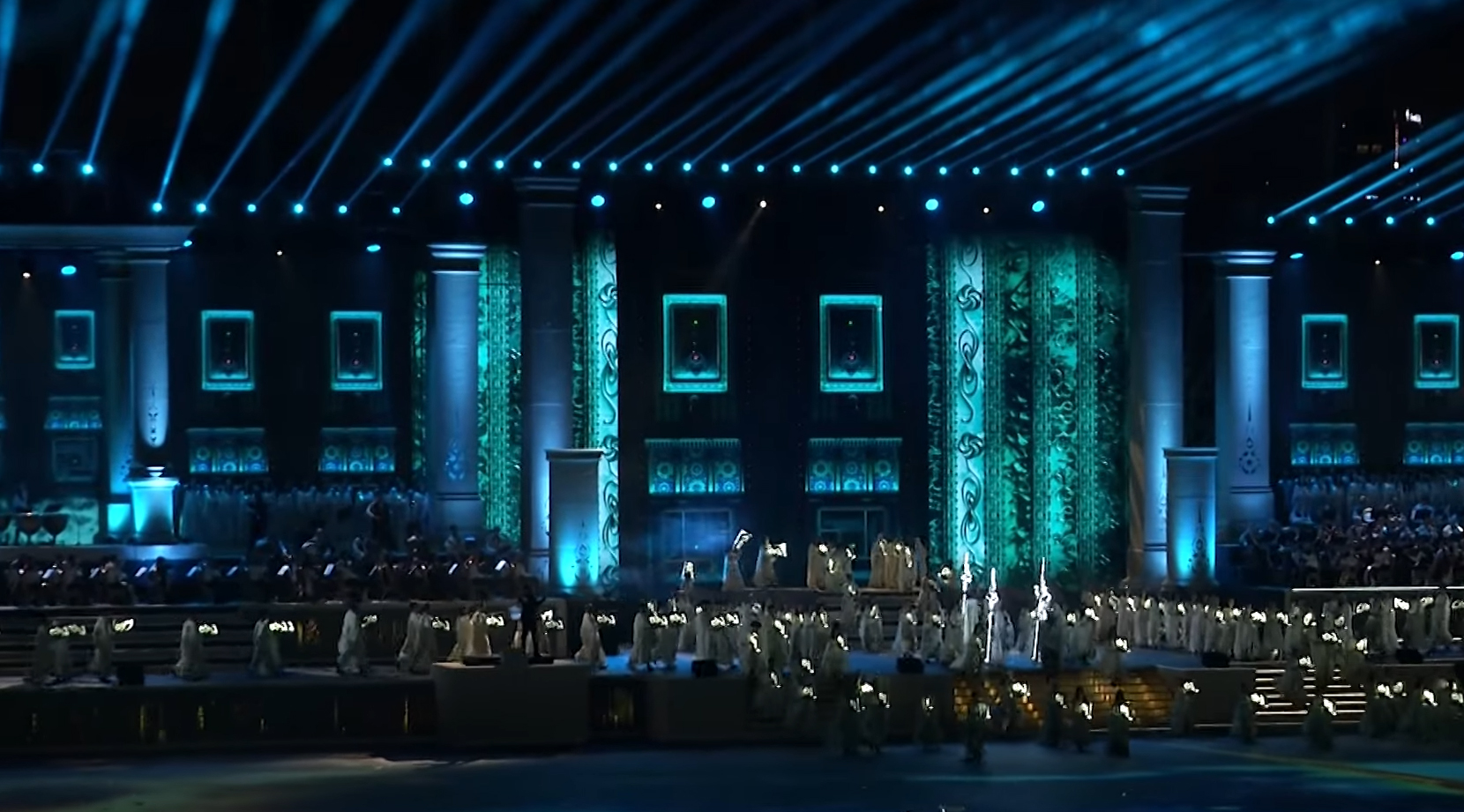

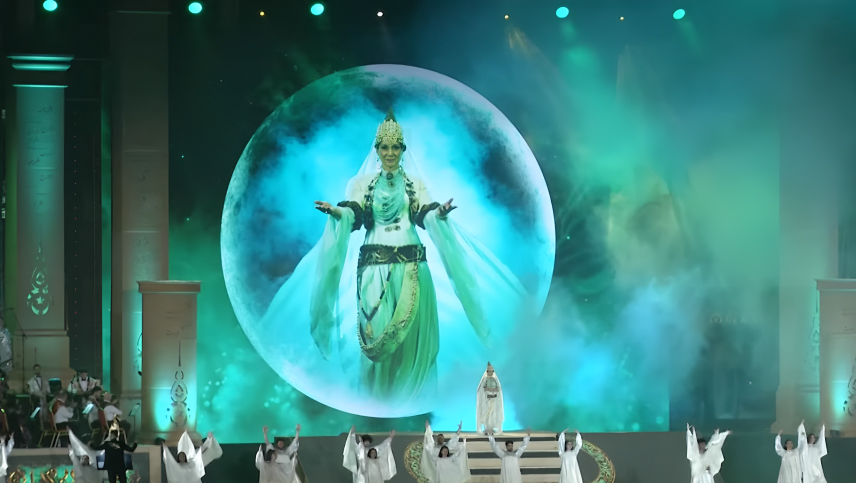

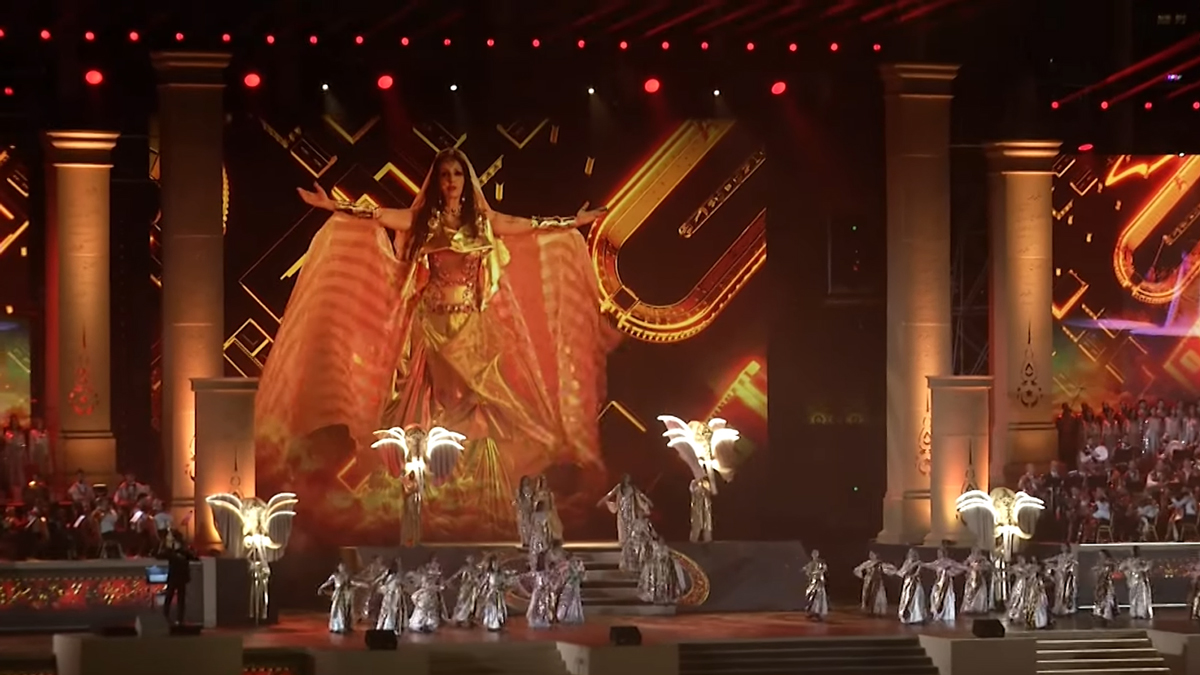

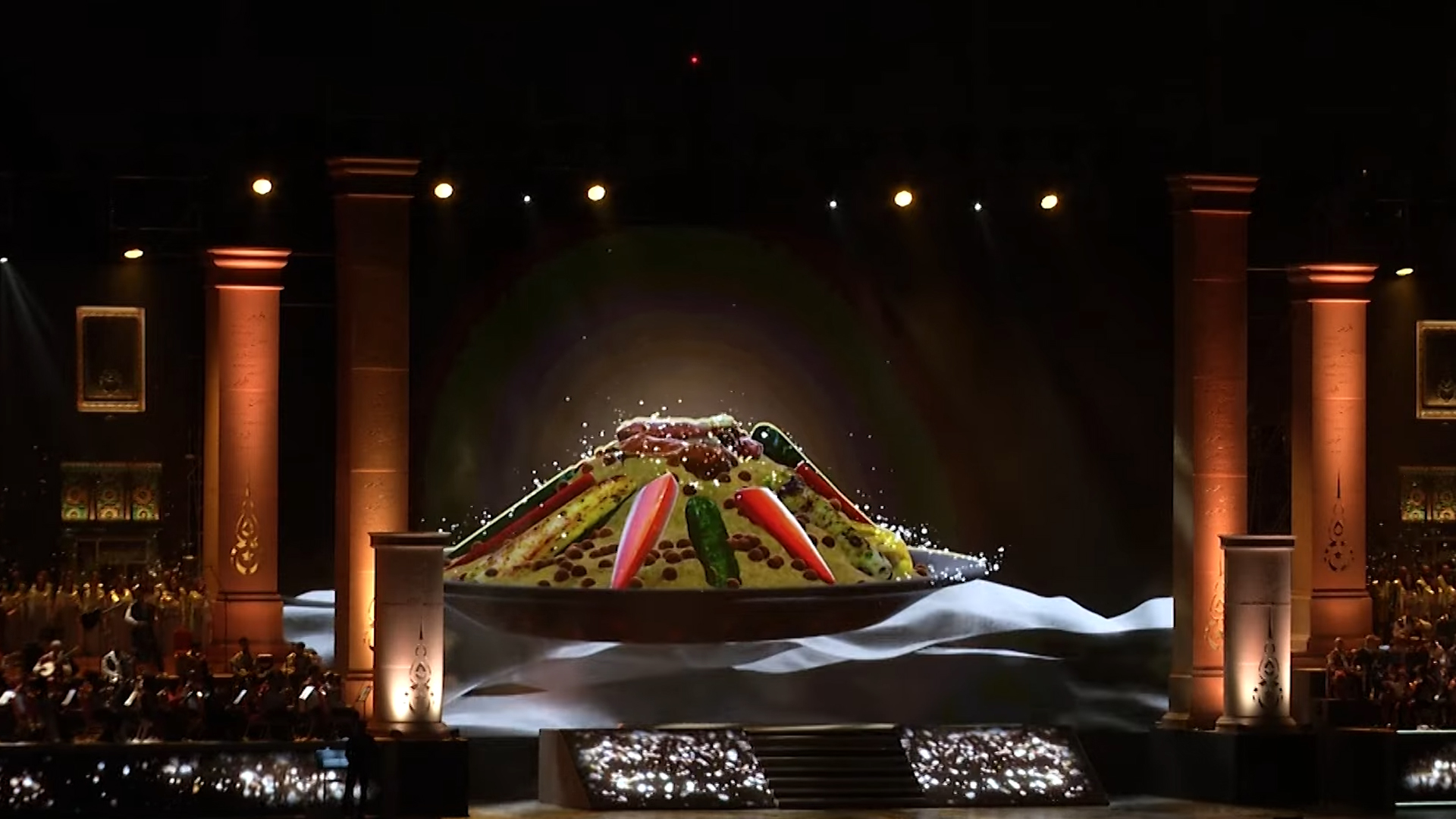

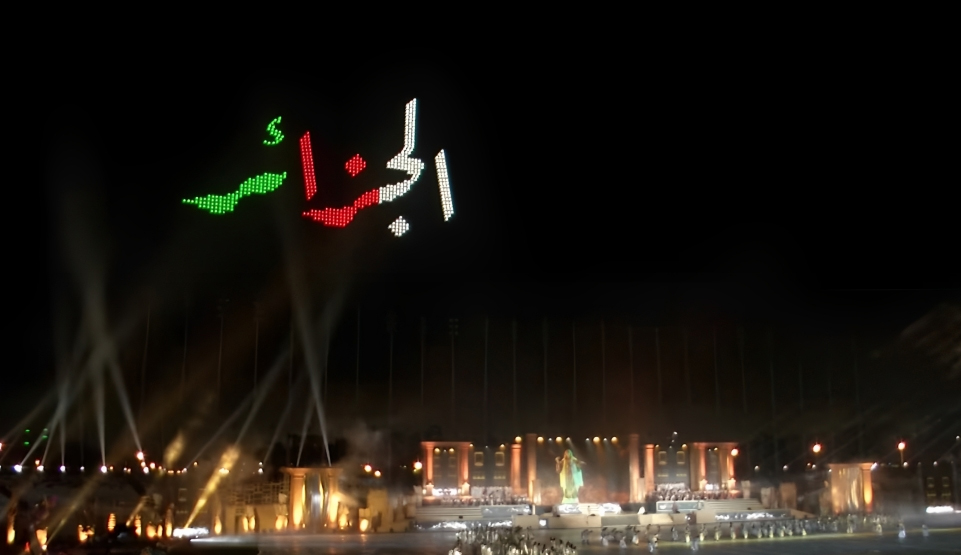

== Anthem ==
For the first time, the competition witnessed the creation of an official anthem dedicated to the event.

== Calendar ==
●	Opening ceremony	●	Competitions	●	Event finals	●	Closing ceremony

	July														Events
Sport	2nd Sun	3rd Mon	4th Tue	5th Wed	6th Thu	7th Fri	8th Sat	9th Sun	10th Mon	11th Tue	12th Wed	13th Thu	14th Fri	15th Sat	Events
Ceremonies				●										●	
Athletics			8	14	7	14									43
Badminton					●	1	●	●	4						5
Basketball 3x3											●	●	2		2
Boules					●	●									17
Boxing						●	●	●	●	●	21				21
Chess						1	1	1		1	1	1			6
Cycling															8
Fencing															12
Football	●			●			●			●			1		1
Gymnastics						●	●								13
Handball					●	●	●	●	●	●	●	●	1		1
Judo				7	7	2									16
Karate															14
Sailing							●	●	●	●	●	8			8
Swimming				7	7	6	6	5	6						37
Table tennis								●	●						7
Volleyball					●	●	●	●	●	●	●	●	2		2
Weightlifting															20
Wrestling								●							20
Goalball								●	●	●	●	1			1
Para-athletics															30
Wheelchair Basketball					●	●	●	●	●		●	●	2		2
Total															286
Cumulative Total															286
	July														Total events
Sport	2nd Sun	3rd Mon	4th Tue	5th Wed	6th Thu	7th Fri	8th Sat	9th Sun	10th Mon	11th Tue	12th Wed	13th Thu	14th Fri	15th Sat	Total events

== Medal table ==
* Host nation (Algeria)

2023 Arab Games medal table
Rank	NOC	Gold	Silver	Bronze	Total
1	Algeria (ALG)*	105	76	72	253
2	Tunisia (TUN)	23	47	51	121
3	Morocco (MAR)	21	38	25	84
4	Bahrain (BHR)	19	11	12	42
5	Jordan (JOR)	17	16	29	62
6	Syria (SYR)	14	15	24	53
7	Egypt (EGY)	12	1	0	13
8	Qatar (QAT)	9	2	11	22
9	Iraq (IRQ)	7	18	21	46
10	Saudi Arabia (KSA)	7	9	28	44
11	United Arab Emirates (UAE)	5	5	12	22
12	Oman (OMA)	5	3	5	13
13	Palestine (PLE)	4	4	8	16
14	Libya (LBA)	3	3	6	12
15	Kuwait (KUW)	2	4	5	11
16	Mauritania (MTN)	0	1	0	1
17	Yemen (YEM)	0	0	2	2
18	Sudan (SUD)	0	0	1	1
19	Chad (CHA)	0	0	0	0
19	Comoros (COM)	0	0	0	0
19	Djibouti (DJI)	0	0	0	0
19	Eritrea (ERI)	0	0	0	0
19	Lebanon (LBN)	0	0	0	0
19	Somalia (SOM)	0	0	0	0
19	South Sudan (SSD)	0	0	0	0
Totals (25 entries)		253	253	312	818
