= Tunisia at the 2023 Arab Games =

- IOC code: TUN
- NOC: Tunisian Olympic Committee

in Algeria July 5, 2023 – July 15, 2023
- Medals Ranked 2nd: Gold 23 Silver 47 Bronze 51 Total 121

Arab Games appearances (overview)
- 1953; 1957; 1961; 1965; 1976; 1985; 1992; 1997; 1999; 2004; 2007; 2011; 2023

Tunisia participated in the 15th Arab Games, which were held in Algeria from 5 to 15 July 2023. It competed with 100 athletes in 10 sports. Tunisia has previously participated in 8 editions (1957, 1985, 1992, 1997, 1999, 2004, 2007, 2011), and is second in the overall standings before the start of this edition.

== Medals ==
=== Medals by sport ===
Tunisia.

Sport	Gold	Silver	Bronze	Total
Totals (0 entries)	0	0	0	0

== Sports ==
=== Basketball ===
Pos	Team	Pld	W	L	PF	PA	PD	Pts
1	Tunisia	0	0	0	0	0	0	0
2	Jordan	0	0	0	0	0	0	0
3	Palestine	0	0	0	0	0	0	0
4	Algeria	0	0	0	0	0	0	0

First match(es) will be played: 13 July 2023. Source:

=== Medals by gender ===
Medals by gender
Gender	1st place, gold medalist(s)	2nd place, silver medalist(s)	3rd place, bronze medalist(s)	Total	Percentage
Male					
Female					
Mixed					
Total					

=== Medals by date ===
Medals by date
Day	Date	1st place, gold medalist(s)	2nd place, silver medalist(s)	3rd place, bronze medalist(s)	Total
1	4 July				
2	5 July				
3	6 July				
4	7 July				
5	8 July				
6	9 July				
7	10 July				
8	11 July				
9	12 July				
10	13 July				
11	14 July				
Total					
