= List of flag bearers for Libya at the Olympics =

Libya at the Olympics
- IOC code: LBA
- NOC: Libyan Olympic Committee
- Website: olympic.ly (in Arabic)
- Medals: Gold 0 Silver 0 Bronze 0 Total 0

Summer appearances
- 1964; 1968; 1972–1976; 1980; 1984; 1988; 1992; 1996; 2000; 2004; 2008; 2012; 2016; 2020; 2024

This is a list of flag bearers who have represented Libya at the Olympics.

Flag bearers carry the national flag of their country at the opening ceremony of the Olympic Games.

#	Event year	Season	Flag bearer	Sport
1	1980	Summer	Nuri Kaheil	Cycling
2	1988	Summer	Said Farouk Al-Turki	Athletics
3	1996	Summer	Elmehdi Abulkheirat	Official
4	2000	Summer	Nizar Mohamed Naeeli	Taekwondo
5	2004	Summer	Mohamed Eshtiwi	Weightlifting
6	2008	Summer	Mohamed Ben Saleh	Judo
7	2012	Summer	Sofyan El Gadi	Swimming
8	2016	Summer	Mohamed Fuad Hrezi	Athletics
9	2020	Summer	Al-Hussein Gambour	Rowing
10	2024	Summer	Mohamed Bukrah	Rowing
10	2024	Summer	Mek Almukhtar	Swimming

== See also ==
- Libya at the Olympics
