= Volleyball at the 1980 Summer Olympics – Men's team rosters =

The following teams and players took part in the men's volleyball tournament at the 1980 Summer Olympics, in Moscow.

== Brazil ==
The following volleyball players represented Brazil:

- Amauri
- Badalhoca
- Antônio Carlos Moreno
- Bernard
- Bernardinho
- Deraldo Wanderley
- Suíço
- João Graneiro
- Montanaro
- Xandó
- Renan
- William

== Bulgaria ==
The following volleyball players represented Bulgaria:

- Stoyan Gunchev
- Khristo Stoyanov
- Dimitar Zlatanov
- Dimitar Dimitrov
- Tsano Tsanov
- Stefan Dimitrov
- Petko Petkov
- Mitko Todorov
- Kaspar Simeonov
- Emil Valchev
- Khristo Iliev
- Yordan Angelov

== Cuba ==
The following volleyball players represented Cuba:

- Antonio Pérez
- Carlos Ruíz
- Carlos Salas
- Diego Lapera
- Ernesto Martínez
- Jorge Garbey
- José David Suárez
- Leonel Marshall Sr.
- Luis Oviedo
- Raúl Vilches
- Ricardo Leyva
- Víctor García

== Czechoslovakia ==
The following volleyball players represented Czechoslovakia:

- Cyril Krejčí
- Igor Prieložný
- Ján Cifra
- Ján Repák
- Jaroslav Kopet
- Jaroslav Šmíd
- Josef Novotný
- Josef Pick
- Pavel Řeřábek
- Pavel Valach
- Vlado Sirvoň
- Vlastimil Lenert

== Italy ==
The following volleyball players represented Italy:

- Antonio Bonini
- Claudio Di Coste
- Fabio Innocenti
- Fabrizio Nassi
- Francesco Dall'Olio
- Franco Bertoli
- Giancarlo Dametto
- Giovanni Lanfranco
- Giulio Belletti
- Mauro Di Bernardo
- Sebastiano Greco
- Stefano Sibani

== Libya ==
The following volleyball players represented Libya:

- Ahmed Zoubi
- Awad Zakka
- Jamal Zarugh
- Kamaluddin Badi
- Miloud Zakka
- Mustafa El-Musbah
- Samid Sagar
- Adnan El-Khuja
- Ahmed El-Faghei

== Poland ==
The following volleyball players represented Poland:

- Bogusław Kanicki
- Lech Łasko
- Leszek Molenda
- Maciej Jarosz
- Robert Malinowski
- Ryszard Bosek
- Tomasz Wójtowicz
- Wiesław Czaja
- Wiesław Gawłowski
- Włodzimierz Nalazek
- Wojciech Drzyzga

== Romania ==
The following volleyball players represented Romania:

- Cornel Oros
- Laurenţiu Dumănoiu
- Dan Gîrleanu
- Nicu Stoian
- Sorin Macavei
- Constantin Sterea
- Nicolae Pop
- Günther Enescu
- Corneliu Chifu
- Marius Chiţiga

== Soviet Union ==
The following volleyball players represented the Soviet Union:

- Yuriy Panchenko
- Vyacheslav Zaytsev
- Aleksandr Savin
- Vladimir Dorokhov
- Aleksandr Ermilov
- Pāvels Seļivanovs
- Oleh Molyboha
- Vladimir Kondra
- Vladimir Chernyshov
- Fedir Lashchonov
- Valeriy Kryvov
- Viljar Loor

== Yugoslavia ==
The following volleyball players represented Yugoslavia:

- Vladimir Bogoevski
- Ivica Jelić
- Boro Jović
- Mladen Kašić
- Zdravko Kuljić
- Slobodan Lozančić
- Radovan Malević
- Miodrag Mitić
- Goran Srbinovski
- Aleksandar Tasevski
- Ljubomir Travica
- Vladimir Trifunović
