= Libya at the 1980 Summer Olympics =

- IOC code: LBA
- NOC: Libyan Olympic Committee

in Moscow
- Competitors: 29 (27 men, 2 women) in 5 sports
- Medals: Gold 0 Silver 0 Bronze 0 Total 0

Summer Olympics appearances (overview)
- 1964; 1968; 1972–1976; 1980; 1984; 1988; 1992; 1996; 2000; 2004; 2008; 2012; 2016; 2020; 2024

Libya (Socialist People's Libyan Arab Jamahiriya) competed at the 1980 Summer Olympics in Moscow, USSR. The nation returned to the Olympic Games after boycotting the 1976 Summer Olympics. 29 competitors, 27 men and 2 women, took part in 20 events in 5 sports.

== Athletics ==
Men's 200 metres

- Ahmed Sallouma

- Heat – 22.88 (→ did not advance)

Men's 800 metres

- Salem El-Margini

- Heat – 1:50.0 (→ did not advance)

Men's 1,500 metres

- Marzouk Mabrouk

- Heat – 3:54.3 (→ did not advance)

Men's Marathon

- Esa Shetewi / Issa Chetoui

- Final – 2:38:01 (→ 44th place)

- Enemri el-Marghani

- Final – 2:42:27 (→ 49th place)

Men's 4x400 metres Relay

- Abashir Fellah, Salem el-Margini, Ahmed Seluma, and Elmehdi Diab (Note: El-Mehdi Sallah Ahmad Diab (Arabic: المهدي صلاح أحمد دياب; born 1958) competed in the 400m and the 4x400m relay at the 1980 Olympics.)

- Heat – 3:16.7 (→ did not advance)

== Cycling ==
Seven cyclists represented Libya in 1980.

Individual road race

- El-Munsif Ben Youssef
- Ali Hamid El-Aila
- Mohamed Ganfud
- Nuri Kaheil

Team time trial

- Ali Hamid El-Aila
- Mohamed El-Kamaa
- Nuri Kaheil
- Khalid Shebani

Sprint

- Fawzi Abdussalam

1000m time trial

- Khalid Shebani

== Swimming ==
Men's 100m Freestyle

- Abdulwahab Werfeli

- Heats – 1.01,55 (→ did not advance, 36th place)

Women's 100m Butterfly

- Nadia Fezzani

Women's 200m Freestyle

- Soad Fezzani

Women's 400m Freestyle

- Soad Fezzani

Women's 100m backstroke

- Soad Fezzani

== Volleyball ==
=== Men's team competition ===
- Preliminary Round (Group B)

- Lost to Romania (0-3)
- Lost to Poland (0-3)
- Lost to Brazil (0-3)
- Lost to Yugoslavia (0-3)

- Classification Match

- 9th/10th place: Lost to Italy (0-3) → 10th place

- Team Roster

- Kamaluddin Badi
- Adnan el-Khuja
- Samir Sagar
- Miloud Zakka
- Mohamed Bochor
- Ahmed Zoubi
- Awad Zakka
- Ahmed el-Fagei
- Jamal Zarugh
- Elmendi el-Sherif
- Ragab Zakka Wanis
- Mustafa el-Musbah

== Weightlifting ==
Men's Flyweight

- Almabruk Mahmud Mahmud (→ 15th place)

Men's Bantamweight

- Ali Shalabi (→ 17th place)
