= Libya at the Islamic Solidarity Games =

- IOC code: LBA
- NOC: Libyan Olympic Committee
- Medals Ranked 30th: Gold 2 Silver 1 Bronze 6 Total 9

Islamic Solidarity Games appearances (overview)
- 2005; 2013; 2017; 2021; 2025

Libya has taken part in every edition of the Islamic Solidarity Games since the first tournament held in Mecca, 2005. By 2025, data from the Islamic Solidarity Sports Federation shows that Libyan competitors have secured 9 medals in total — including 2 gold, 1 silver, and 6 bronze. Overall, Libyan holds the top 30th position in the medal table as off the last Islamic Solidarity Games held in Riyadh, Saudi Arabia.

== Medal tables ==
=== Medals by Islamic Solidarity Games ===
Host nation

Below is the table representing all Libyan medals in the games. Until now, Libya has won 9 medals (2 gold, 1 silver, and 6 bronze).

Games	Athletes	Gold	Silver	Bronze	Total	Rank	Notes	RF
(Saudi Arabia) 2005 Mecca		0	0	1	1	28th	details	
(Iran) 2010 Tehran	Canceled							
(Indonesia) 2013 Palembang		0	1	1	2	20th	details	
(Azerbaijan) 2017 Baku	withdrew							
(Turkey) 2021 Konya		1	0	3	4	25th	details	
(Saudi Arabia) 2025 Riyadh		1	0	1	2	27th	details	
(Malaysia) 2029 Selangor	Future event							
Total		2	1	6	9	30th	-	-

== See also ==
- Libya at the Olympics
- Libya at the Paralympics
- Libya at the Arab Games
- Libya at the African Games
- Libya at the Mediterranean Games
- Sports in Libya
