= List of Libyan records in swimming =

The Libyan records in swimming are the fastest ever performances of swimmers from Libya, which are recognised and ratified by the Libyan Swimming Federation.

All records were set in finals unless noted otherwise.

== Long Course (50 m) ==
=== Men ===
Event	Time		Name	Club	Date	Meet	Location	Ref
50 m freestyle	23.38	h	Ahmad Attellesey	SK Triton	10 July 2016	Swedish Championships	Norrköping, Sweden	
100 m freestyle	52.34	h	Audai Hassouna	Libya	24 July 2019	World Championships	Gwangju, South Korea	
200 m freestyle	1:53.74	h	Audai Hassouna	Libya	23 July 2019	World Championships	Gwangju, South Korea	
400 m freestyle	4:29.51	h	Abdulhai Abdulmenem Ashour	Libya	3 July 2022	Mediterranean Games	Bir El Djir, Algeria	
800 m freestyle								
1500 m freestyle								
50 m backstroke	28.43	h, †	Adel El-Fakir	Libya	24 July 2017	World Championships	Budapest, Hungary	
100 m backstroke	58.48	h	Adel El-Fakir	Libya	24 July 2017	World Championships	Budapest, Hungary	
200 m backstroke	2:26.78	h	Yousef Abubaker	Libya	30 April 2024	African Championships	Luanda, Angola	
50 m breaststroke	30.89	h	Anas Ganedi	Libya	3 May 2024	African Championships	Luanda, Angola	
100 m breaststroke	1:07.23		Anas Ganedi	Libya	30 August 2025	Arab Championships	Casablanca, Morocco	
200 m breaststroke	2:33.30		Jad Idris	Libya	31 August 2025	Arab Championships	Casablanca, Morocco	
50 m butterfly	25.39	h	Ahmad Attellesey	SK Triton	30 March 2016	Swim Open Stockholm	Stockholm, Sweden	
100 m butterfly	56.99	h	Sofyan El Gadi	Libya	2 August 2012	Olympic Games	London, United Kingdom	
200 m butterfly	2:14.90		Jad Idris	Libya	29 August 2025	Arab Championships	Casablanca, Morocco	
200 m individual medley	2:39.91	h	Abdulmalek Ben-Musa	Libya	13 September 2010	10th African Swimming Championships	Casablanca, Morocco	
400 m individual medley								
4×100 m freestyle relay								
4×200 m freestyle relay								
4×100 m medley relay								

Legend: # – Record awaiting ratification by Libyan Swimming Federation; WR – World record; AF – African record;
Records not set in finals: h – heat; sf – semifinal; r – relay 1st leg; rh – relay heat 1st leg; b – B final; † – en route to final mark; so – swim-off; tt – time trial

=== Women ===
Event	Time		Name	Club	Date	Meet	Location	Ref
50 m freestyle	29.01	h	Maleek Al-Mukthar	Libya	9 December 2023	African Junior Championships	Saint Pierre, Mauritius	
50 m freestyle	28.46	h, #	Maleek Al-Mukthar	Libya	9 January 2024	Arab Age Group Championships	Doha, Qatar	
100 m freestyle	1:04.43	h	Maleek Al-Mukthar	Libya	7 December 2023	African Junior Championships	Saint Pierre, Mauritius	
100 m freestyle	1:02.26	h, #	Maleek Al-Mukthar	Libya	9 January 2024	Arab Age Group Championships	Doha, Qatar	
200 m freestyle	2:30.14	h	Soad Fezzani	Libya	23 July 1980	Olympic Games	Moscow, Russia	
400 m freestyle	5:16.17	h	Soad Fezzani	Libya	22 July 1980	Olympic Games	Moscow, Russia	
800 m freestyle								
1500 m freestyle								
50 m backstroke	33.54	h	Maleek Al-Mukthar	Libya	7 December 2023	African Junior Championships	Saint Pierre, Mauritius	
100 m backstroke	1:09.45		Maleek Al-Mukhtar	Libya	8 May 2026	African Championships	Oran, Algeria	
200 m backstroke	2:39.16	h	Maleek Al-Mukthar	Libya	8 December 2023	African Junior Championships	Saint Pierre, Mauritius	
50 m breaststroke	38.50	h, †	Asmahan Farhat	Libya	10 August 2008	Olympic Games	Beijing, Chile	
100 m breaststroke	1:21.68	h	Asmahan Farhat	Libya	10 August 2008	Olympic Games	Beijing, Chile	
200 m breaststroke								
50 m butterfly								
100 m butterfly	1:12.94	h	Nadia Fezzani	Libya	23 July 1980	Olympic Games	Moscow, Russia	
200 m butterfly								
200 m individual medley								
400 m individual medley								
4×100 m freestyle relay								
4×200 m freestyle relay								
4×100 m medley relay								

Legend: # – Record awaiting ratification by Libyan Swimming Federation; WR – World record; AF – African record;
Records not set in finals: h – heat; sf – semifinal; r – relay 1st leg; rh – relay heat 1st leg; b – B final; † – en route to final mark; so – swim-off; tt – time trial

=== Mixed relay ===
Event	Time	Name	Club	Date	Meet	Location	Ref
4×100 m freestyle relay	4:09.13	Maleek Al-Mukthar	Libya	8 December 2023	African Junior Championships	Saint Pierre, Mauritius	

Legend: # – Record awaiting ratification by Libyan Swimming Federation; WR – World record; AF – African record;
Records not set in finals: h – heat; so – swim-off

== Short Course (25 m) ==
=== Men ===
Event	Time		Name	Club	Date	Meet	Location	Ref
50 m freestyle	22.81	r	Ahmad Attellesey	Malmö Kappsimningsklubb	2 November 2017	SM/JSM	Jönköping, Sweden	
100 m freestyle	50.90	h	Audai Hassouna	University of Edinburgh	17 November 2019	British Universities and Colleges Sport	Sheffield, United Kingdom	
200 m freestyle	1:50.00	h	Audai Hassouna	University of Edinburgh	16 November 2019	British Universities and Colleges Sport	Sheffield, United Kingdom	
400 m freestyle	4:04.26		Audai Hassouna	University of Edinburgh	7 December 2018	Scottish Open National Championships	United Kingdom	
800 m freestyle	10:27.87		Ahmad Attellesey	Trelleborgs Simsällskap	15 March 2008	Distanscupen 2	Trelleborg, Sweden	
1500 m freestyle	20:33.72		Ahmad Attellesey	SK Triton	21 March 2010	U Gp 2 2010	Löddeköpinge, Sweden	
50 m backstroke	26.36		Mohamed Aljbali	-	29 November 2024	Libyan Championships	Tripoli, Libya	
100 m backstroke	55.83	h	Adel Elfakir	Libya	6 December 2016	World Championships	Windsor, Canada	
200 m backstroke	2:20.41	h	Sofyan El Gadi	Libya	13 April 2008	World Championships	Manchester, United Kingdom	
50 m breaststroke	30.09	h	Anas Ganedi	Libya	14 December 2024	World Championships	Budapest, Hungary	
100 m breaststroke	1:04.87		Anas Ganedi	EST	25 December 2025	Tunisian Winter Championships	Tunis, Tunisia	
200 m breaststroke	2:25.07		Malek Aljbali	-	29 November 2024	Libyan Championships	Tripoli, Libya	
50m butterfly	24.48	h	Ahmad Attellesey	Malmö Kappsimningsklubb	1 November 2017	SM/JSM	Jönköping, Sweden	
100m butterfly	56.48	h	Ahmad Attellesey	SK Triton	6 May 2016	19th Danish International Swim Cup	Esbjerg, Denmark	
200m butterfly	2:19.06	h	Sofyan El Gadi	Libya	19 December 2010	World Championships	Dubai, United Arab Emirates	
100m individual medley	1:01.32		Ahmad Attellesey	SK Triton	30 November 2015	Tritonspelen	Staffanstorp, Sweden	
200m individual medley	2:11.74		Malek Aljbali	-	29 November 2024	Libyan Championships	Tripoli, Libya	
400m individual medley								
4×50m freestyle relay								
4×100m freestyle relay								
4×200m freestyle relay								
4×50m medley relay								
4×100m medley relay								

Legend: # – Record awaiting ratification by Libyan Swimming Federation; WR – World record; AF – African record;
Records not set in finals: h – heat; sf – semifinal; r – relay 1st leg; rh – relay heat 1st leg; b – B final; † – en route to final mark; so – swim-off; tt – time trial

=== Women ===
Event	Time		Name	Club	Date	Meet	Location	Ref
50m freestyle								
100m freestyle								
200m freestyle								
400m freestyle								
800m freestyle								
1500m freestyle								
50m backstroke	34.97	h	Asmahan Farhat	Libya	12 April 2008	World Championships	Manchester, United Kingdom	
100m backstroke	1:16:30		Asmahan Farhat	Libya	9 April 2008	World Championships	Manchester, United Kingdom	
200m backstroke								
50m breaststroke	37.77	h	Asmahan Farhat	Libya	9 April 2008	World Championships	Manchester, United Kingdom	
100m breaststroke	1:25.15		Asmahan Farhat	Libya	12 April 2008	World Championships	Manchester, United Kingdom	
200m breaststroke								
50m butterfly	33.98	h	Asmahan Farhat	Libya	10 April 2008	World Championships	Manchester, United Kingdom	
100m butterfly								
200m butterfly								
100m individual medley	1:14.22	h	Asmahan Farhat	Libya	10 April 2008	World Championships	Manchester, United Kingdom	
200m individual medley								
400m individual medley								
4×50m freestyle relay								
4×100m freestyle relay								
4×200m freestyle relay								
4×50m medley relay								
4×100m medley relay								

Legend: # – Record awaiting ratification by Libyan Swimming Federation; WR – World record; AF – African record;
Records not set in finals: h – heat; sf – semifinal; r – relay 1st leg; rh – relay heat 1st leg; b – B final; † – en route to final mark; so – swim-off; tt – time trial
