= Libya at the 2024 Summer Paralympics =

- Flag of Libya
- IPC code: LBA
- NPC: Libyan Paralympic Committee

in Paris, France August 28, 2024 – September 8, 2024
- Competitors: 3 (1 man and 2 women) in 2 sports
- Flag bearers: Ghazalah Alaqouri; Waleed Ashteebah
- Medals: Gold 0 Silver 0 Bronze 0 Total 0

Summer Paralympics appearances (overview)
- 1996; 2000; 2004; 2008; 2012; 2016; 2020; 2024

Libya competed at the 2024 Summer Paralympics in Paris, France, from 28 August to 8 September 2024.

== Competitors ==
The following is the list of number of competitors in the Games.

Sport	Men	Women	Total
Athletics	1	1	2
Powerlifting	0	1	1
Total	1	2	3

== Athletics ==
Key

- Note–Ranks given for track events are within the athlete's heat only
- Q = Qualified for the next round
- q = Qualified for the next round as a fastest loser or, in field events, by position without achieving the qualifying target
- DQ = Disqualified
- PR = Paralympic Record
- AR = Area (or continental) Record
- NR = National Record
- SB = Season's Best
- N/A = Round not applicable for the event
- Bye = Athlete not required to compete in round

Field Events
Men

Athlete	Event	Qualification		Final	
Athlete	Event	Result	Rank	Result	Rank
Waleed Ashteebah	Men's shot put F63	—		DNS	
Abraar Albahloul	Women's shot put F64	—		5.39	15

== Powerlifting ==
Athlete	Event	Attempts (kg)				Result (kg)	Rank
Athlete	Event	1	2	3	4	Result (kg)	Rank
Ghazalah Alaqouri	Women's +86 kg	85	90	93	—	93	9

== See also ==
- Libya at the 2024 Summer Olympics
- Libya at the Paralympics
