= Libya at the 2008 Summer Olympics =

- IOC code: LBA
- NOC: Libyan Olympic Committee
- Website: olympic.ly (in Arabic)

in Beijing
- Competitors: 7 in 5 sports
- Flag bearer: Mohamed Ben Saleh
- Medals: Gold 0 Silver 0 Bronze 0 Total 0

Summer Olympics appearances (overview)
- 1964; 1968; 1972–1976; 1980; 1984; 1988; 1992; 1996; 2000; 2004; 2008; 2012; 2016; 2020; 2024

Libya was represented at the 2008 Summer Olympics in Beijing, China by the Libyan Olympic Committee.

In total, seven athletes including five men and two women represented Libya in five different sports including athletics, cycling, judo, swimming and taekwondo.

== Competitors ==
In total, seven athletes represented Libya at the 2008 Summer Olympics in Beijing, China across five different sports.

Sport	Men	Women	Total
Athletics	1	1	2
Cycling	1	0	1
Judo	1	0	1
Swimming	1	1	2
Taekwondo	1	0	1
Total	5	2	7

== Athletics ==
In total, two Libyan athletes participated in the athletics events – Ghada Ali in the women's 400 m and Ali Mabrouk El Zaidi in the men's marathon.

The men's marathon took place on 24 August 2008. El Zaidi did not finish.

Athlete	Event	Final	
Athlete	Event	Result	Rank
Ali Mabrouk El Zaidi	Marathon	DNF	

The heats for the women's 400 m took place on 16 August 2008. Ali finished seventh in her heat in a time of one minute 6.19 seconds and she did not advance to the semi-finals.

Athlete	Event	Heat		Semifinal		Final	
Athlete	Event	Result	Rank	Result	Rank	Result	Rank
Ghada Ali	400 m	1:06.19	7	Did not advance			

== Cycling ==
In total, one Libyan athlete participated in the cycling events – Ahmed Belgasem in the men's road race.

The men's road race took place on 9 August 2008. Belgasem did not finish.

Athlete	Event	Time	Rank
Ahmed Belgasem	Men's road race	Did not finish	

== Judo ==
In total, one Libyan athlete participated in the judo events – Mohamed Ben Saleh in the men's −100 kg category.

The men's −100 kg category took place on 14 August 2008. In the first round, Saleh lost by ippon to Dániel Hadfi of Hungary.

Athlete	Event	Round of 32	Round of 16	Quarterfinals	Semifinals	Repechage 1	Repechage 2	Repechage 3	Final / BM	
Athlete	Event	Opposition Result	Opposition Result	Opposition Result	Opposition Result	Opposition Result	Opposition Result	Opposition Result	Opposition Result	Rank
Mohamed Ben Saleh	Men's −100 kg	Hadfi (HUN); L 0001–1001	Did not advance							

== Swimming ==
In total, two Libyan athletes participated in the swimming events – Sofyan El Gadi in the men's 100 m freestyle and Asmahan Farhat.in the women's 100 m breaststroke.

The heats for the men's 100 m freestyle took place on 12 August 2008. El Gadi finished third in his heat in a time of 57.89 seconds which was ultimately not fast enough to advance to the semi-finals.

Athlete	Event	Heat		Semifinal		Final	
Athlete	Event	Time	Rank	Time	Rank	Time	Rank
Sofyan El Gadi	100 m freestyle	57.89	64	Did not advance			

The heats for the women's 100 m breaststroke took place on 10 August 2008. Farhat finished first in her heat in a time of one minute 21.68 seconds which was ultimately not fast enough to advance to the semi-finals.

Athlete	Event	Heat		Semifinal		Final	
Athlete	Event	Time	Rank	Time	Rank	Time	Rank
Asmahan Farhat	100 m breaststroke	1:21.68	47	Did not advance			

== Taekwondo ==
In total, one Libyan athlete participated in the taekwondo events – Ezedin Tlish in the men's −68 kg category.

The men's –68 kg category took place on 21 August 2008. In the first round, Tlish lost to Dmitriy Kim of Uzbekistan.

Athlete	Event	Round of 16	Quarterfinals	Semifinals	Repechage	Bronze Medal	Final	
Athlete	Event	Opposition Result	Opposition Result	Opposition Result	Opposition Result	Opposition Result	Opposition Result	Rank
Ezedin Tlish	Men's −68 kg	Kim (UZB); L DSQ	Did not advance					
