= Libya at the 2000 Summer Olympics =

- IOC code: LBA
- NOC: Libyan Olympic Committee
- Website: olympic.ly (in Arabic)

in Sydney
- Competitors: 3 in 3 sports
- Flag bearer: Nizar Mohamed Naeeli
- Medals: Gold 0 Silver 0 Bronze 0 Total 0

Summer Olympics appearances (overview)
- 1964; 1968; 1972–1976; 1980; 1984; 1988; 1992; 1996; 2000; 2004; 2008; 2012; 2016; 2020; 2024

Libya competed at the 2000 Summer Olympics in Sydney, Australia. The country's participation in Sydney marked its sixth appearance at a Summer Olympics since its debut at the 1964 Games. The delegation included three male athletes; marathon runner Adel Edeli, judoka Tarek Ayad and Nizar Mohamed Naeeli in taekwondo. Edeli did not finish his race, while Ayad and Naeeli were both eliminated in the first bouts of their respective tournaments.

== Background ==
Libya participated in six Summer Olympics between its debut at the 1964 Games in Mexico City, Mexico, and the 2000 Summer Olympics in Sydney, Australia. It has competed at the Olympics on an intermittent basis since its debut, with a 12-year gap taking place before it returned at the 1980 Games in Moscow, Soviet Union, and then not attending the following games in 1984. It had boycotted the 1976 Summer Olympics because of the inclusion of the New Zealand team at the Games despite the breach of the international sports boycott of South Africa by the nation's rugby union team shortly prior. It also boycotted the 1984 Games, following the rejection of visas to three Libyan journalists by the United States. The highest number of Libyans at any one Summer Olympics was 29 at the 1980 Moscow Games.

There were three male athletes in the Libyan team for the 2000 Summer Olympics, one in athletics, one in judo and one in taekwondo. The nation had been represented by judokas previously at the 1992 Games, but it was the first time that a Libyan had competed in taekwondo at the Summer Olympics which became an official Olympic sport at the 2000 Games.

== Competitors ==
The following is the list of number of competitors in the Games.

Sport	Men	Women	Total
Athletics	1	0	1
Judo	1	0	1
Taekwondo	1	0	1
Total	3	0	3

== Athletics ==
Adel Edeli was the only competitor in athletics for Libya at the 2000 Summer Olympics; he took part in the men's marathon on 1 October. In a field of 100 runners, 19 did not complete the race including Edeli. The medals were shared between athletes from African nations with the gold and bronze going to Ethiopia's Gezahgne Abera (two hours, ten minutes and 11 seconds) and Tesfaye Tola (two hours, 11 minutes and ten seconds) respectively, and the silver won by Eric Wainaina from Kenya (two hours, ten minutes and 31 seconds).

Key

- L = Lost
- PTG = Points decision
- DNF = Did not finish

Road & track

Athlete	Event	Final	
Athlete	Event	Result	Rank
Adel Edeli	Men's marathon	DNF	

== Judo ==
Libya's sole judoka at the 2000 Games was Tarek Ayad, who had previously won a bronze medal at the 1998 African Judo Championships in Dakar, Senegal. He competed at the Sydney Convention and Exhibition Centre on 17 September, He was defeated by Japan's Yukimasa Nakamura in the first round of the tournament, after Nakamura scored an ippon to automatically win the bout and eliminate Ayad.

Judo

Athlete	Event	Round of 32	Round of 16	Quarterfinals	Semifinals	Final	Repechage 1	Repechage 2	Repechage 3	Bronze
Athlete	Event	Opposition Result	Opposition Result	Opposition Result	Opposition Result	Opposition Result	Opposition Result	Opposition Result	Opposition Result	Opposition Result
Tarek Ayad	–66 kg	Nakamura (JPN); L	did not advance							

== Taekwondo ==
The only athlete competing in taekwondo for Libya at the 2000 Summer Olympics was Nizar Mohamed Naeeli, who also acted as the nation's flagbearer during the Parade of Nations during the 2008 Summer Olympics opening ceremony. At the State Sports Centre on 28 September, Naeeli fought Aslanbek Dzitiyev of Russia, losing by points, thereby being eliminated from the tournament.

Taekwondo

Athlete	Event	Preliminary round	Quarterfinals	Semifinals	Repechage Quarterfinals	Repechage Semifinals	Final
Athlete	Event	Opposition Result	Opposition Result	Opposition Result	Opposition Result	Opposition Result	Opposition Result
Nizar Mohamed Naeeli	Men's −68 kg	Dzitiyev (RUS); L PTG	did not advance				

== See also ==
- Libya at the 2000 Summer Paralympics
