= Libya at the 2012 Summer Paralympics =

- IPC code: LBA
- NPC: Libyan Paralympic Committee
- Website: www.paralympic.ly

in London
- Competitors: 2 in 2 sports
- Flag bearer: Abdelrahim Busanan
- Medals: Gold 0 Silver 0 Bronze 0 Total 0

Summer Paralympics appearances (overview)
- 1996; 2000; 2004; 2008; 2012; 2016; 2020; 2024

Libya competed at the 2012 Summer Paralympics in London, United Kingdom from August 29 to September 9, 2012.

== Athletics ==
Men’s field

Athlete	Event	Mark	Points	Rank
Hamza Elhmali	Club throw F31-32/51	28.29	875	10

== Powerlifting ==
Men

Athlete	Event	Result	Rank
Abdelrazik Baaba	-82.5kg	155	12

== See also ==
- Libya at the Paralympics
- Libya at the 2012 Summer Olympics
