= 2012 Summer Olympics closing ceremony flag bearers =

During the closing ceremony of the 2012 Summer Olympics in London, the flag bearers of 205 National Olympic Committees (NOCs) arrived into the main Olympic Stadium. The flags of each country were not necessarily carried by the same flag bearer as in the opening ceremony.

== Countries and flagbearers ==
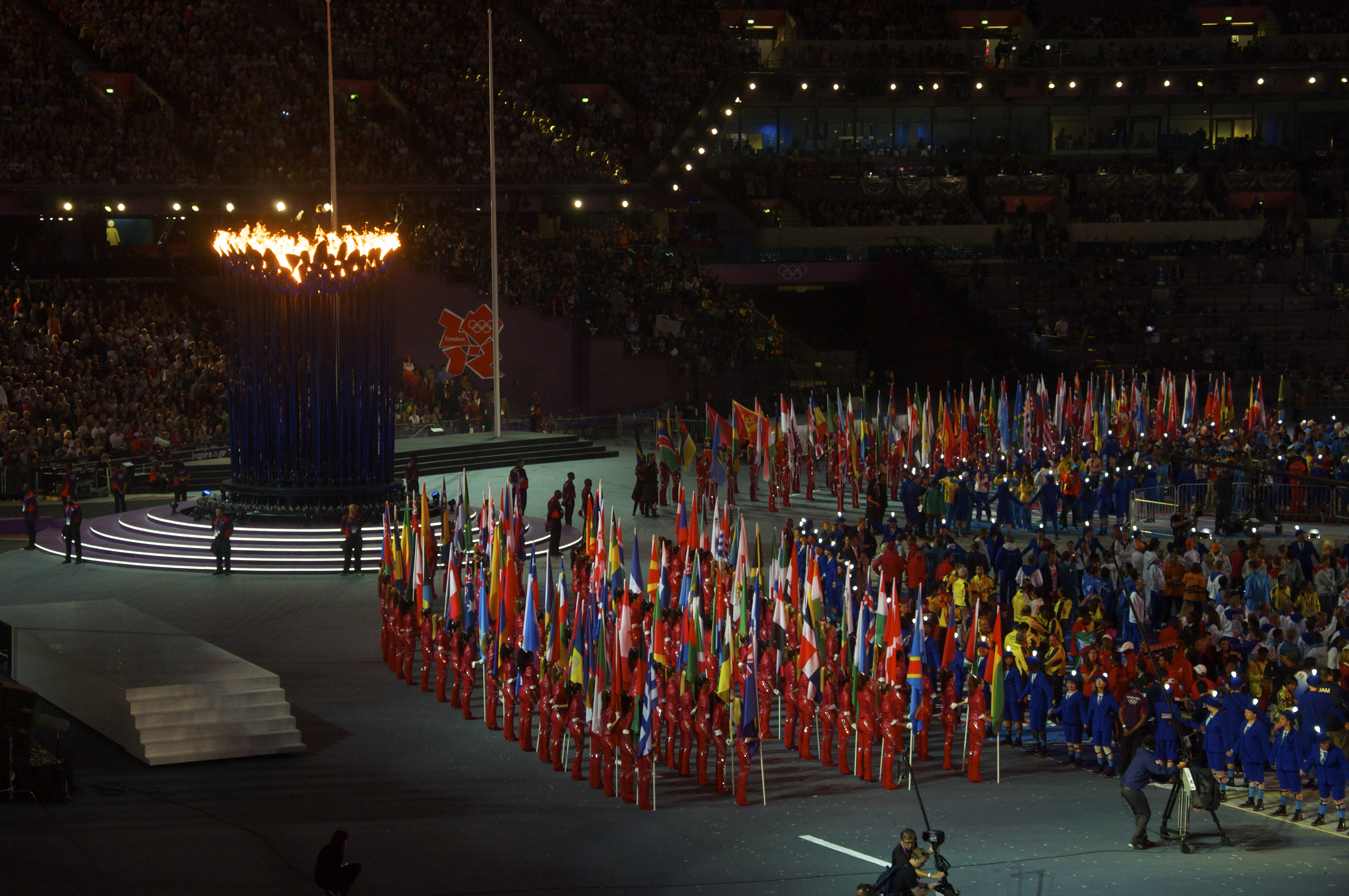
The parade of all 205 National Olympic Committee flags in the closing ceremony

Below is a list of all parading countries with their announced flag bearer, sorted in the order in which they appeared in the parade. This is sortable by country name under which they entered, the flag bearer's name, or the flag bearer's sport. Names are given as were officially designated by the International Olympic Committee (IOC).

No.	Country	Flag bearer	Sport
1	Greece	Spyridon Gianniotis	Swimming
2	Afghanistan	Rohullah Nikpai	Taekwondo
3	Albania	Romela Begaj	Weightlifting
4	Algeria	Taoufik Makhloufi	Athletics
5	American Samoa	Ching Maou Wei	Swimming
6	Andorra	Antoni Bernadó	Athletics
7	Angola	Marcelina Kiala	Handball
8	Antigua and Barbuda	Karin O'Reilly	Swimming
9	Argentina	Sebastián Crismanich	Taekwondo
10	Armenia	Arsen Julfalakyan	Wrestling
11	Aruba	Jayme Mata	Judo
12	Australia	Malcolm Page	Sailing
13	Austria	Beate Schrott	Athletics
14	Azerbaijan	Toghrul Asgarov	Wrestling
15	Bahamas	Chandra Sturrup	Athletics
16	Bahrain	LOCOG – Games Maker	
17	Bangladesh	LOCOG – Games Maker	
18	Barbados	Kyle Maxwell	Judo
19	Belarus	Raman Piatrushenka	Canoeing
20	Belgium	Lionel Cox	Shooting
21	Belize	Kenneth Medwood	Athletics
22	Benin	Jacob Gnahoui	Judo
23	Bermuda	Flora Duffy	Triathlon
24	Bhutan	Sherab Zam	Archery
25	Bolivia	Claudia Balderrama	Athletics
26	Bosnia and Herzegovina	Kemal Mešić	Athletics
27	Botswana	Oteng Oteng	Boxing
28	Brazil	Esquiva Falcão	Boxing
29	British Virgin Islands	Tahesia Harrigan	Athletics
30	Brunei	Anderson Lim	Swimming
31	Bulgaria	Stanka Zlateva	Wrestling
32	Burkina Faso	Angelika Ouedraogo	Swimming
33	Burundi	Diane Nukuri	Athletics
34	Cambodia	Sorn Davin	Taekwondo
35	Cameroon	Annabelle Ali	Wrestling
36	Canada	Christine Sinclair	Football
37	Cape Verde	Ruben Sança	Athletics
38	Cayman Islands	Ronald Forbes	Athletics
39	Central African Republic	David Boui	Taekwondo
40	Chad	Hinikissia Ndikert	Athletics
41	Chile	Paris Inostroza	Fencing
42	China	Xu Lijia	Sailing
43	Colombia	Mariana Pajón	Cycling
44	Comoros	Maoulida Daroueche	Athletics
45	Republic of the Congo	Aminata Aboubakar Yacoub	Swimming
46	Cook Islands	Luisa Peters	Weightlifting
47	Costa Rica	Gabriela Traña	Athletics
48	Ivory Coast	Philippe Kouassi	Archery
49	Croatia	Damir Martin	Rowing
50	Cuba	Mijaín López	Wrestling
51	Cyprus	Chrystalleni Trikomiti	Gymnastics
52	Czech Republic	Barbora Špotáková	Athletics
53	North Korea	Ri Jong-Myong	Wrestling
54	Democratic Republic of the Congo	Cédric Mandembo	Judo
55	Denmark	Allan Nørregaard	Sailing
56	Djibouti	Yasmin Farah	Table tennis
57	Dominica	Luan Gabriel	Athletics
58	Dominican Republic	Félix Sánchez	Athletics
59	Ecuador	César de Cesare	Canoeing
60	Egypt	Tamer Bayoumi	Taekwondo
61	El Salvador	Melissa Mikec	Shooting
62	Equatorial Guinea	Bibiana Olama	Athletics
63	Eritrea	Zersenay Habteselassie	Athletics
64	Estonia	Heiki Nabi	Wrestling
65	Ethiopia	Tirunesh Dibaba	Athletics
66	Fiji	Leslie Copeland	Athletics
67	Finland	Antti Ruuskanen	Athletics
68	Macedonia	Kristijan Efremov	Athletics
69	France	Laura Flessel-Colovic	Fencing
70	Gabon	Ruddy Zang Milama	Athletics
71	The Gambia	Suwaibou Sanneh	Athletics
72	Georgia	Lasha Shavdatuashvili	Judo
73	Germany	Kristof Wilke	Rowing
74	Ghana	Maxwell Amponsah	Boxing
75	Grenada	Neisha Bernard-Thomas	Athletics
76	Guam	Ricardo Blas, Jr.	Judo
77	Guatemala	Erick Barrondo	Athletics
78	Guinea	Facinet Keita	Judo
79	Guinea-Bissau	Augusto Midana	Wrestling
80	Guyana	Aliann Pompey	Athletics
81	Haiti	Marlena Wesh	Athletics
82	Honduras	Karen Vilorio	Swimming
83	Hong Kong	Tang Peng	Table tennis
84	Hungary	Krisztián Pars	Athletics
85	Iceland	Ragna Ingólfsdóttir	Badminton
86	Independent Olympic Athletes	LOCOG – Games Maker	
87	India	Mary Kom	Boxing
88	Indonesia	LOCOG – Games Maker	
89	Iran	Komeil Ghasemi	Wrestling
90	Iraq	Ali Salman	Wrestling
91	Ireland	Darren O'Neill	Boxing
92	Israel	Neta Rivkin	Gymnastics
93	Italy	Daniele Molmenti	Canoeing
94	Jamaica	Hansle Parchment	Athletics
95	Japan	Saori Yoshida	Wrestling
96	Jordan	Mohammad Abu-Libdeh	Taekwondo
97	Kazakhstan	Serik Sapiyev	Boxing
98	Kenya	David Rudisha	Athletics
99	Kiribati	David Katoatau	Weightlifting
100	South Korea	Song Dae-Nam	Judo
101	Kuwait	LOCOG – Games Maker	
102	Kyrgyzstan	Bekzat Osmonaliev	Weightlifting
103	Laos	Kilakone Siphonexay	Athletics
104	Latvia	Ineta Radēviča	Athletics
105	Lebanon	Andrea Paoli	Taekwondo
106	Lesotho	Mosito Lehata	Athletics
107	Liberia	Phobay Kutu-Akoi	Athletics
108	Libya	Hala Gezah	Athletics
109	Liechtenstein	Julia Hassler	Swimming
110	Lithuania	Jevgenij Shuklin	Canoeing
111	Luxembourg	Laurent Carnol	Swimming
112	Madagascar	Fetra Ratsimiziva	Judo
113	Malawi	Mike Tebulo	Athletics
114	Malaysia	Pandelela Rinong	Diving
115	Maldives	Azneem Ahmed	Athletics
116	Mali	Rahmatou Dramé	Athletics
117	Malta	Diane Borg	Athletics
118	Marshall Islands	Giordan Harris	Swimming
119	Mauritania	LOCOG – Games Maker	
120	Mauritius	Natacha Rigobert	Beach volleyball
121	Mexico	María Espinoza	Taekwondo
122	Federated States of Micronesia	Debra Daniel	Swimming
123	Moldova	Zalina Marghieva	Athletics
124	Monaco	Damien Desprat	Sailing
125	Mongolia	Nyambayaryn Tögstsogt	Boxing
126	Montenegro	Bojana Popović	Handball
127	Morocco	Wiam Dislam	Taekwondo
128	Mozambique	Kurt Couto	Athletics
129	Myanmar	LOCOG – Games Maker	
130	Namibia	Sem Shilimela	Wrestling
131	Nauru	Itte Detenamo	Weightlifting
132	Nepal	Prasiddha Jung Shah	Swimming
133	Netherlands	Ranomi Kromowidjojo	Swimming
134	New Zealand	Mahé Drysdale	Rowing
135	Nicaragua	Osmar Bravo	Boxing
136	Niger	Moustapha Hima	Boxing
137	Nigeria	Sinivie Boltic	Wrestling
138	Norway	Eirik Verås Larsen	Canoeing
139	Oman	LOCOG – Games Maker	
140	Pakistan	Sohail Abbas	Field hockey
141	Palau	Rodman Teltull	Athletics
142	Palestine	Woroud Sawalha	Athletics
143	Panama	Omar Simmonds	Judo
144	Papua New Guinea	Steven Kari	Weightlifting
145	Paraguay	Ben Hockin	Swimming
146	Peru	Inés Melchor	Athletics
147	Philippines	Jasmine Alkhaldi	Swimming
148	Poland	Michał Jeliński	Rowing
149	Portugal	Fernando Pimenta	Canoeing
150	Puerto Rico	Javier Culson	Athletics
151	Qatar	Mohammed Bakhet	Athletics
152	Romania	Sandra Izbașa	Gymnastics
153	Russia	Anastasia Davydova	Synchronized swimming
154	Rwanda	Adrien Niyonshuti	Cycling
155	Saint Kitts and Nevis	Antoine Adams	Athletics
156	Saint Lucia	Levern Spencer	Athletics
157	Saint Vincent and the Grenadines	Courtney Carl Williams	Athletics
158	Samoa	Kaino Thomsen-Fuataga	Taekwondo
159	San Marino	Alessandra Perilli	Shooting
160	São Tomé and Príncipe	Lecabela Quaresma	Athletics
161	Saudi Arabia	Yousef Ahmed	Athletics
162	Senegal	Hortense Diédhiou	Judo
163	Serbia	Milica Mandić	Taekwondo
164	Seychelles	Lissa Labiche	Athletics
165	Sierra Leone	Ibrahim Turay	Athletics
166	Singapore	Colin Cheng	Sailing
167	Slovakia	Danka Barteková	Shooting
168	Slovenia	Franka Anić	Taekwondo
169	Solomon Islands	Tony Lomo	Judo
170	Somalia	Zamzam Mohamed Farah	Athletics
171	South Africa	Oscar Pistorius	Athletics
172	Spain	Saúl Craviotto	Canoeing
173	Sri Lanka	Niluka Karunaratne	Badminton
174	Sudan	Rabah Yousif	Athletics
175	Suriname	Kirsten Nieuwendam	Athletics
176	Swaziland	Sibusiso Matsenjwa	Athletics
177	Sweden	Fredrik Lööf	Sailing
178	Switzerland	Nicola Spirig	Triathlon
179	Syria	Majed Aldin Ghazal	Athletics
180	Chinese Taipei	Tseng Li-Cheng	Taekwondo
181	Tajikistan	Mavzuna Chorieva	Boxing
182	Tanzania	Zakia Mrisho	Athletics
183	Thailand	Kaeo Pongprayoon	Boxing
184	Timor-Leste	Juventina Napoleão	Athletics
185	Togo	Sacha Denanyoh	Judo
186	Tonga	Joseph Andy Lui	Athletics
187	Trinidad and Tobago	George Bovell	Swimming
188	Tunisia	Oussama Mellouli	Swimming
189	Turkey	Servet Tazegül	Taekwondo
190	Turkmenistan	LOCOG – Games Maker	
191	Tuvalu	Asenate Manoa	Athletics
192	Uganda	Ganzi Mugula	Swimming
193	Ukraine	Oleksiy Torokhtiy	Weightlifting
194	United Arab Emirates	LOCOG – Games Maker	
195	United States	Bryshon Nellum	Athletics
196	Uruguay	Alejandro Foglia	Sailing
197	Uzbekistan	Abbos Atoev	Boxing
198	Vanuatu	Nazario Fiakaifonu	Judo
199	Venezuela	Jessica López	Gymnastics
200	Vietnam	Le Huynh Chau	Taekwondo
201	Virgin Islands	LaVerne Jones-Ferrette	Athletics
202	Yemen	Nabil Al-Garbi	Athletics
203	Zambia	Prince Mumba	Athletics
204	Zimbabwe	Cuthbert Nyasango	Athletics
205	Great Britain	Ben Ainslie	Sailing
