= Libya at the 1996 Summer Olympics =

- IOC code: LBA
- NOC: Libyan Olympic Committee
- Website: olympic.ly (in Arabic)

in Atlanta
- Competitors: 5 in 2 sports
- Flag bearer: Mehdi Abdulkeirat
- Medals: Gold 0 Silver 0 Bronze 0 Total 0

Summer Olympics appearances (overview)
- 1964; 1968; 1972–1976; 1980; 1984; 1988; 1992; 1996; 2000; 2004; 2008; 2012; 2016; 2020; 2024

Libya (Great Socialist People's Libyan Arab Jamahiriya) competed at the 1996 Summer Olympics in Atlanta, United States.

== Competitors ==
The following is the list of number of competitors in the Games.

Sport	Men	Women	Total
Athletics	4	0	4
Cycling	1	0	1
Total	5	0	5

== Results by event ==
=== Athletics ===
==== Men ====
Track and road events

Athletes	Events	Heat Round 1		Heat Round 2		Semifinal		Final	
Athletes	Events	Time	Rank	Time	Rank	Time	Rank	Time	Rank
Khaled Othman	100 metres	11.65	103	did not advance					
Moustafa Abdel Naser (Note: Moustafa Abdel Naser (Arabic: مصطفى عبد الناصر; born 4 April 1975), seeded in the first heat in the 400 m, was disqualified for a lane violation.)	400 metres	Disqualified		did not advance					
Ali El-Zaidi	1500 metres	3:15.49	50	N/A		did not advance			
Adel Adili	Marathon	N/A						2:32:12	88

=== Cycling ===
==== Road ====
Men

Athlete	Event	Time	Rank
Yousef Shadi	Road race	did not finish	

== See also ==
- Libya at the 1996 Summer Paralympics
