= Libya at the 2004 Summer Olympics =

- IOC code: LBA
- NOC: Libyan Olympic Committee
- Website: olympic.ly (in Arabic)

in Athens
- Competitors: 8 in 5 sports
- Flag bearer: Mohamed Eshtiwi
- Medals: Gold 0 Silver 0 Bronze 0 Total 0

Summer Olympics appearances (overview)
- 1964; 1968; 1972–1976; 1980; 1984; 1988; 1992; 1996; 2000; 2004; 2008; 2012; 2016; 2020; 2024

Libya, represented as Libyan Arab Jamahiriya, competed at the 2004 Summer Olympics in Athens, Greece, from 13 to 29 August 2004.

== Athletics ==
Libyan athletes have so far achieved qualifying standards in the following athletics events (up to a maximum of 3 athletes in each event at the 'A' Standard, and 1 at the 'B' Standard).

Key

- Note–Ranks given for track events are within the athlete's heat only
- Q = Qualified for the next round
- q = Qualified for the next round as a fastest loser or, in field events, by position without achieving the qualifying target
- NR = National record
- N/A = Round not applicable for the event
- Bye = Athlete not required to compete in round

Men

Athlete	Event	Final	
Athlete	Event	Result	Rank
Ali Mabrouk El Zaidi	Marathon	2:20:31	39

Women

Athlete	Event	Heat		Semifinal		Final	
Athlete	Event	Result	Rank	Result	Rank	Result	Rank
Ruwida El-Hubti	400 m	1:03.57 NR	7	Did not advance			

== Judo ==
Libya has qualified a single judoka through a tripartite invitation.

Athlete	Event	Round of 32	Round of 16	Quarterfinals	Semifinals	Repechage 1	Repechage 2	Repechage 3	Final / BM	
Athlete	Event	Opposition Result	Opposition Result	Opposition Result	Opposition Result	Opposition Result	Opposition Result	Opposition Result	Opposition Result	Rank
Mohamed Ben Saleh	Men's −81 kg	Krawczyk (POL); L 0000–1101	Did not advance			Hawn (USA); L 0000–1001	Did not advance			

== Swimming ==
Men

Athlete	Event	Heat		Semifinal		Final	
Athlete	Event	Time	Rank	Time	Rank	Time	Rank
Khaled Ghezzawi	50 m freestyle	27.55	71	Did not advance			

Women

Athlete	Event	Heat		Semifinal		Final	
Athlete	Event	Time	Rank	Time	Rank	Time	Rank
Amira Edrahi	50 m freestyle	34.67	72	Did not advance			

== Taekwondo ==
Libyan has qualified a single taekwondo jin. Ezedin Salem lost his first round bout when the referee ended the contest, then withdrew in his repechage match due to his physical injuries sustained from his opening bout.

Athlete	Event	Round of 16	Quarterfinals	Semifinals	Repechage 1	Repechage 2	Final / BM	
Athlete	Event	Opposition Result	Opposition Result	Opposition Result	Opposition Result	Opposition Result	Opposition Result	Rank
Ezedin Tlish	Men's −58 kg	Chu M-Y (TPE); L RSC	Did not advance		Ramos (ESP); L WO	Did not advance		7

== Weightlifting ==
Two Libyan weightlifters qualified for the following events:

Athlete	Event	Snatch		Clean & Jerk		Total	Rank
Athlete	Event	Result	Rank	Result	Rank	Total	Rank
Mohamed Eshtiwi	Men's −77 kg	155	=11	180	=16	335	16
Hamza Abu-Ghalia	Men's −85 kg	147.5	15	~~180~~	DNF	147.5	DNF

== See also ==
- Libya at the 2005 Mediterranean Games
