= Libya at the 2008 Summer Paralympics =

- IPC code: LBA
- NPC: Libyan Paralympic Committee
- Website: www.paralympic.ly

in Beijing
- Competitors: 3 in 2 sports
- Flag bearer: Sahar Mostafa M El Gnemi
- Medals: Gold 0 Silver 0 Bronze 0 Total 0

Summer Paralympics appearances (overview)
- 1996; 2000; 2004; 2008; 2012; 2016; 2020; 2024

Libya sent a delegation to compete at the 2008 Summer Paralympics in Beijing, People's Republic of China.

== Sports ==
=== Powerlifting ===
Athlete	Event	Result	Rank
Sahar Mostafa M El Gnemi	82.5kg	95.0	7

=== Table tennis ===
Athlete	Event	Preliminaries				Quarterfinals	Semifinals	Final / BM	
Athlete	Event	Opposition Result	Opposition Result	Opposition Result	Rank	Opposition Result	Opposition Result	Opposition Result	Rank
Ali Mabrouk Ahmed	Men's singles C2	Molliens (FRA); L 0–3	Poddubnyy (RUS); L 0–3	Kim K Y (KOR); L 0–3	4	did not advance			
Khaled Ahmed Abuajela	Men's singles C3	Robinson (GBR); L WBF	Guilhem (FRA); L 0-3	—	3	did not advance			
Ali Mabrouk Ahmed; Khaled Ahmed Abuajela	Men's team C3	—				Great Britain (GBR); L 0-3	did not advance		

== See also ==
- Libya at the Paralympics
- Libya at the 2008 Summer Olympics
