= Libya at the 2005 Mediterranean Games =

- IOC code: LBA
- NOC: Libyan Olympic Committee

in Almería
- Medals Ranked 16th: Gold 1 Silver 0 Bronze 1 Total 2

Mediterranean Games appearances
- 1951; 1955; 1959; 1963; 1967; 1971; 1975; 1979; 1983; 1987; 1991; 1993; 1997; 2001; 2005; 2009; 2013; 2018; 2022

Libya (LBA) competed at the 2005 Mediterranean Games in Almería, Spain. The nation had a total number of 34 participants (34 men and 0 women).

== Medals ==
=== Gold ===
Weightlifting

- Men's 85 kg (Snatch)

- Mohamed Eshtiwi

=== Bronze ===
Football

- Men's Team Competition

- Mohamed Ben Nabia, Mohamed El-Mughraby, Abddrahman Ezwawi, Mansur Agala, Ayman El-Hagi, Abdissalam Msallem, Ala Mohamed, Ibrahim Abda, Mohamed Esnani, Marwan Almabrok, Muhsan Ashrif, Mohamed Gbrail, Hamed Ahniash, Zakaria Benmusa, Walid El-Khatroushi, Nabil Hndi, Ahmed Wafa, Mohamed Fares, Ante Cacic, Rida Ateya, and Ramadan El Shebli

== See also ==
- Libya at the 2004 Summer Olympics
- Libya at the 2008 Summer Olympics
