= Libya at the 2004 Summer Paralympics =

- IPC code: LBA
- NPC: Libyan Paralympic Committee
- Website: www.paralympic.ly

in Athens
- Competitors: 2 in 1 sport
- Medals Ranked 76th: Gold 0 Silver 0 Bronze 0 Total 0

Summer Paralympics appearances (overview)
- 1996; 2000; 2004; 2008; 2012; 2016; 2020; 2024

Libya competed at the 2004 Summer Paralympics in Athens, Greece. They were represented by 2 sportspeople, neither of whom won a medal. Libya participated in their third Paralympic Games in Athens, sending their smallest delegation to date at the time. but won no medals.

== Sports ==
=== Powerlifting ===
==== Men ====
Athlete	Event	Result	Rank
Abdelsalam Gharsa	60kg	162.5	6

==== Women ====
Athlete	Event	Result	Rank
Sahar Elgnemi	75kg	80.0	6

== See also ==
- Libya at the Paralympics
- Libya at the 2004 Summer Olympics
