= Libya at the 1988 Summer Olympics =

- IOC code: LBA
- NOC: Libyan Olympic Committee

in Seoul
- Competitors: 6 in 3 sports
- Flag bearer: Said Farouk Al-Turki
- Medals: Gold 0 Silver 0 Bronze 0 Total 0

Summer Olympics appearances (overview)
- 1964; 1968; 1972–1976; 1980; 1984; 1988; 1992; 1996; 2000; 2004; 2008; 2012; 2016; 2020; 2024

Libya (Great Socialist People's Libyan Arab Jamahiriya) competed at the 1988 Summer Olympics in Seoul, South Korea. Six competitors, all men, took part in five events in three sports.

== Competitors ==
The following is the list of number of competitors in the Games.

Sport	Men	Women	Total
Athletics	2	0	2
Cycling	2	0	2
Weightlifting	2	–	2
Total	6	0	6

== Athletics ==
Men
Track and road events

Athlete	Event	Heat Round 1		Heat Round 2		Semifinal		Final	
Athlete	Event	Time	Rank	Time	Rank	Time	Rank	Time	Rank
Abdullah Ali Ahmed	200 metres	22.11	58	Did not advance					
Abdullah Ali Ahmed	400 metres	48.89	60	Did not advance					

Field events

Athlete	Event	Qualification		Final	
Athlete	Event	Distance	Position	Distance	Position
Fathi Khalifa Aboud	Triple jump	15.13	36	Did not advance	

== Cycling ==
=== Road ===
Two cyclists represented Libya in 1988.

Men

Athlete	Event	Time	Rank
Abdullah Badri	Road race	DNF	
Abdel Hamed El-Hadi	Road race	DNF	

== Weightlifting ==
Athlete	Event	Snatch		Clean & jerk		Total	Rank
Athlete	Event	Result	Rank	Result	Rank	Total	Rank
Ahmed El-Magrisi	90 kg	135.0	19	172.5	17	307.5	20
Abdullah Mussa	90 kg	NM		DNF			
