= Libya at the 2020 Summer Paralympics =

- IPC code: LBA
- NPC: Libyan Paralympic Committee
- Website: www.paralympic.ly

in Tokyo
- Competitors: 1 in 1 sports
- Medals: Gold 0 Silver 0 Bronze 0 Total 0

Summer Paralympics appearances (overview)
- 1996; 2000; 2004; 2008; 2012; 2016; 2020; 2024

Libya competed at the 2020 Summer Paralympics in Tokyo, Japan, from 24 August to 5 September 2021.

== Taekwondo ==
Libya qualified one athlete to compete at the Paralympics competition. Mohamed Alsanousi Abidzar qualified by winning the gold medal at the 2020 African Qualification Tournament in Rabat, Morocco.

Athlete	Event	First round	Quarterfinals	Repechage 1	Repechage 2	Final/Bronze medal	
Athlete	Event	Opposition Result	Opposition Result	Opposition Result	Opposition Result	Opposition Result	Rank
Mohamed Alsanousi Abidzar	Men's +75 kg	Francisco Pedroza (MEX) W 28-25	Evan Medell (USA) L 19-22	Joseph Lane (GBR) W 23-18	Andrés Molina (CRC) L 17-19	Did not advance	7

== See also ==
- Libya at the Paralympics
- Libya at the 2020 Summer Olympics
