= Libya at the 2016 Summer Paralympics =

- IPC code: LBA
- NPC: Libyan Paralympic Committee
- Website: www.paralympic.ly

in Rio de Janeiro
- Competitors: 3 in 2 sports
- Medals: Gold 0 Silver 0 Bronze 0 Total 0

Summer Paralympics appearances (overview)
- 1996; 2000; 2004; 2008; 2012; 2016; 2020; 2024

Libya competed at the 2016 Summer Paralympics in Rio de Janeiro, Brazil, from 7 September to 18 September 2016. The country has three sportspeople competing in two sports.

== Disability classifications ==
Every participant at the Paralympics has their disability grouped into one of five disability categories; amputation, the condition may be congenital or sustained through injury or illness; cerebral palsy; wheelchair athletes, there is often overlap between this and other categories; visual impairment, including blindness; Les autres, any physical disability that does not fall strictly under one of the other categories, for example dwarfism or multiple sclerosis. Each Paralympic sport then has its own classifications, dependent upon the specific physical demands of competition. Events are given a code, made of numbers and letters, describing the type of event and classification of the athletes competing. Some sports, such as athletics, divide athletes by both the category and severity of their disabilities, other sports, for example swimming, group competitors from different categories together, the only separation being based on the severity of the disability.

== Athletics ==
Waleed Ashteebah is competing in the Men's Javelin Throw - F44 event, and is classified F42.

Men's Field

Athlete	Events	Result	Rank
Waleed Ashteebah	Shot Put F42	Did not start	
Waleed Ashteebah	Javelin F42-44	30.45	14

== Powerlifting ==
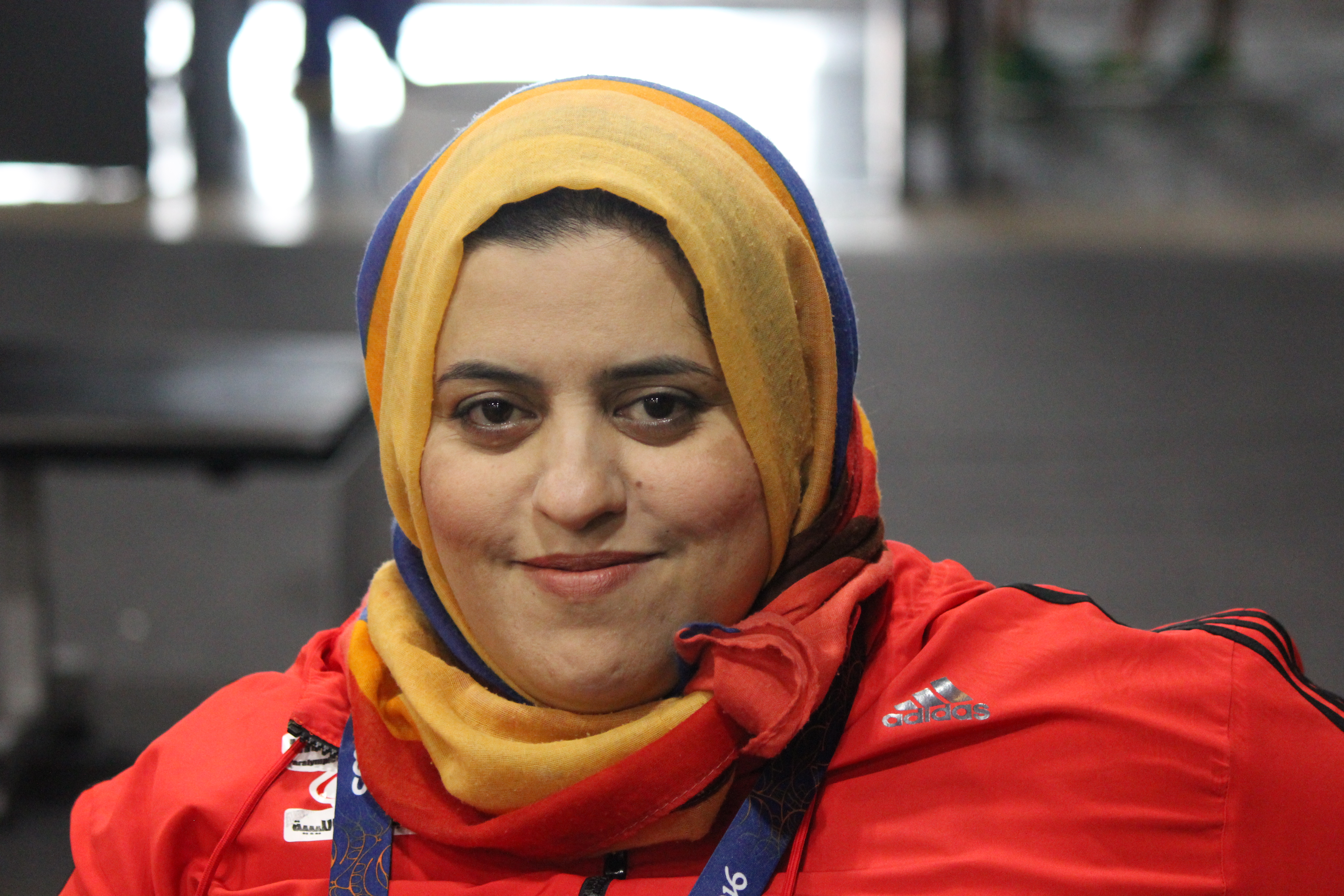
Ghazalah Alaqouri

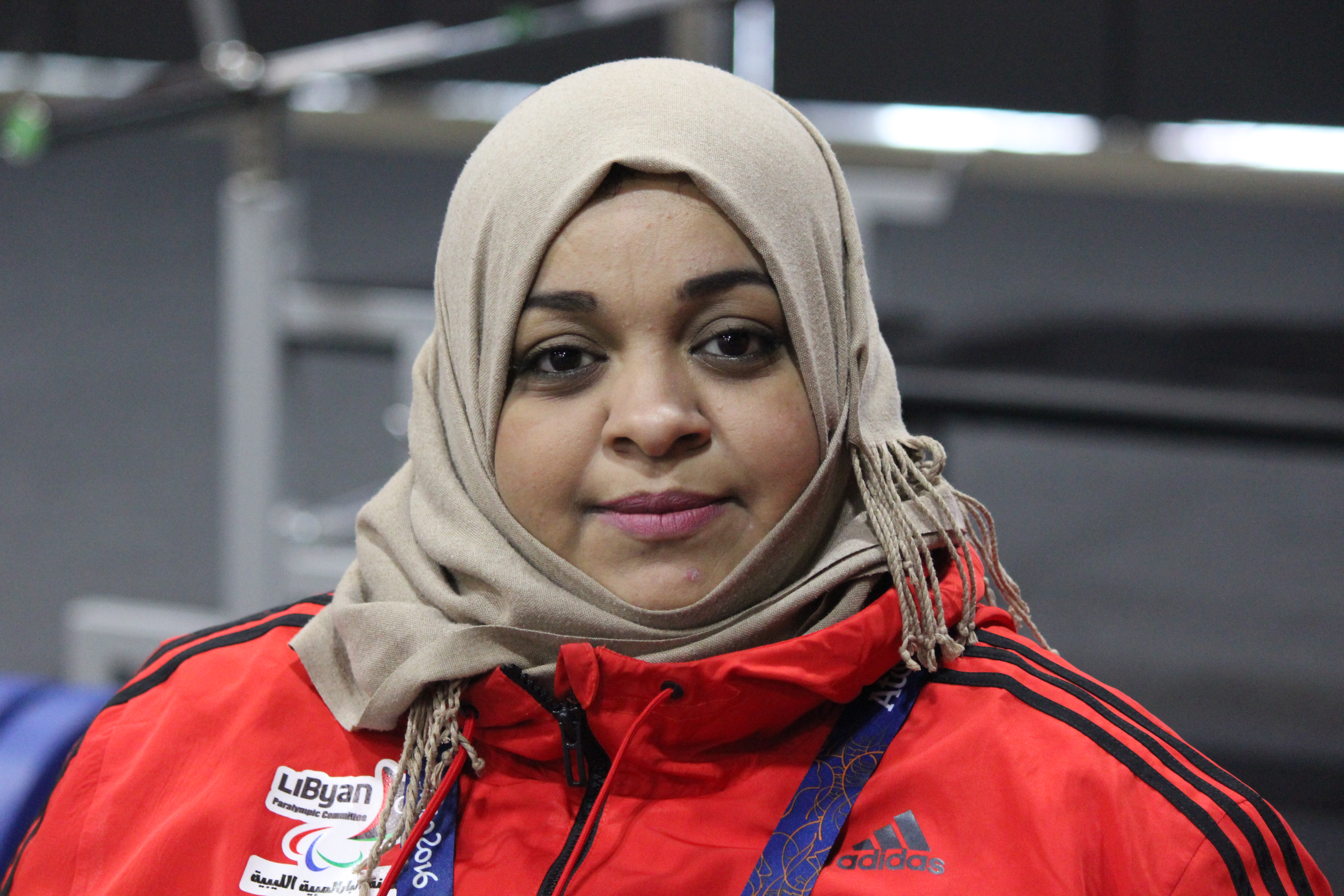
Sahar Elgnemi

Ghazalah Alaqouri and Sahar Elgnemi are Libya's two powerlifting competitors.

Athlete	Event	Result	Rank
Sahar Elgnemi	Women's −79 kg	85	8
Ghazalah Alaqouri	Women's +86 kg	No Mark	

== See also ==
- Libya at the 2016 Summer Olympics
