= Per Larsen =

Per Larsen may refer to:

- Per Larsen (weightlifter)
- Per Larsen (politician)

== See also ==
- Per Sinding-Larsen, Swedish journalist, television presenter and singer
- Per Laursen, Danish darts player
