= Libya at the 2000 Summer Paralympics =

Libya at the 2008 Summer Paralympics
- IPC code: LBA
- NPC: Libyan Paralympic Committee
- Website: www.paralympic.ly

in Sydney
- Competitors: 17 in 3 sports
- Medals Ranked 64th: Gold 0 Silver 0 Bronze 1 Total 1

Summer Paralympics appearances (overview)
- 1996; 2000; 2004; 2008; 2012; 2016; 2020; 2024

Libya sent its largest ever delegation to the 2000 Summer Paralympics in Sydney, with three judokas, two powerlifters and a sitting volleyball team. The country's only female competitor, Ghazala M. Ali in powerlifting, was the first ever woman to represent Libya at the Paralympic Games.

== Team ==
Competing in only their second ever Paralympic Games, Libya was represented 17 sportspeople in Sydney, including three judokas, two powerlifters and a sitting volleyball team. The country's only female competitor, Ghazala M. Ali in powerlifting, was the first ever woman to represent Libya at the Paralympic Games.

== Medals ==
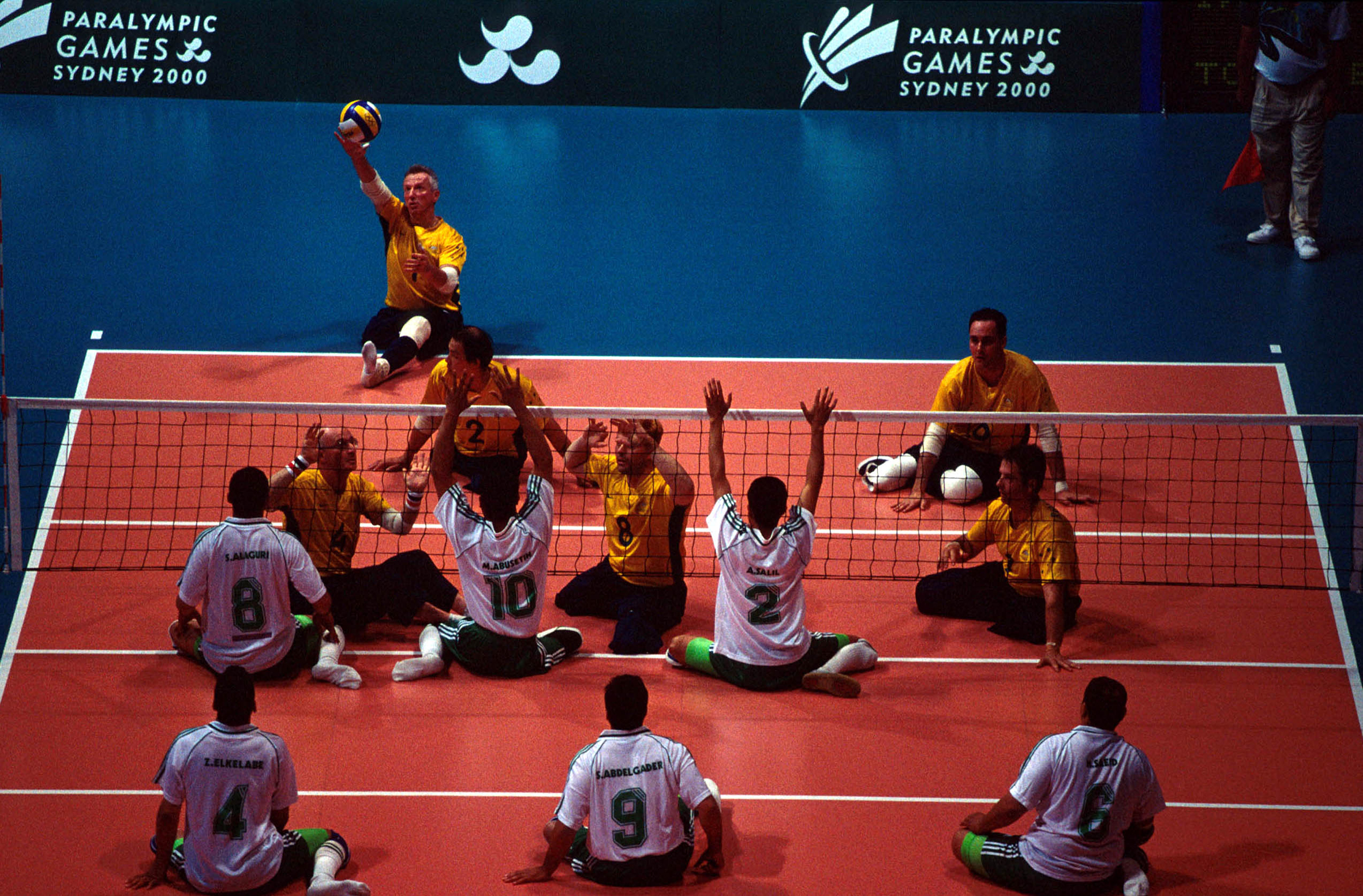
Australian sitting volleyball team serves the ball to Libya during 2000 Sydney Paralympic Games match, seen from above.

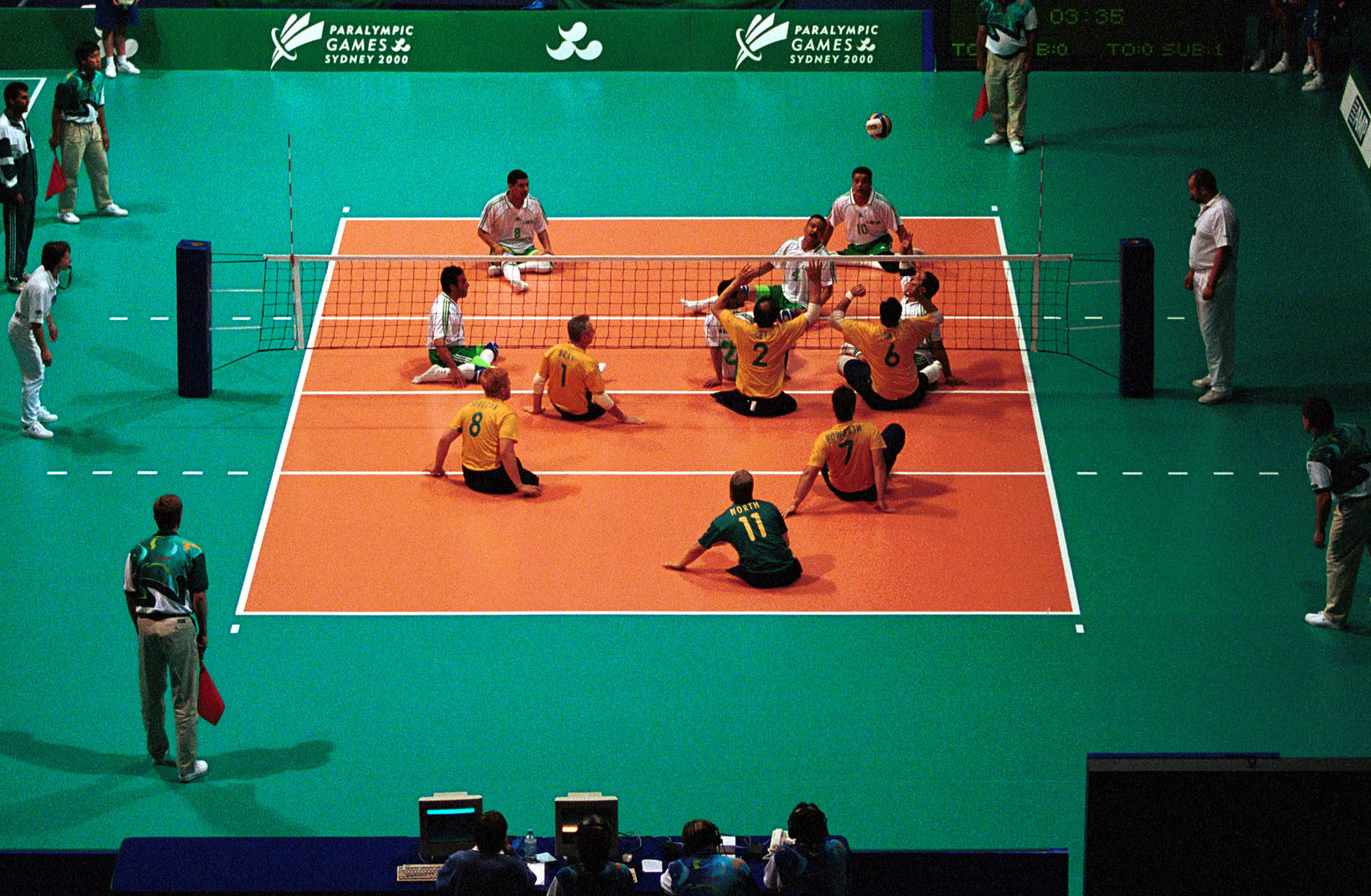
The Australian sitting volleyball team vs Libya during 2000 Sydney Paralympic Games match, seen from above,

The 2000 Games saw Libya win its first (and so far only) Paralympic medal, when Abdelrahim Hamed took bronze in the men's over 100 kg in powerlifting, lifting 235 kg.

Medal	Name	Sport	Event
Bronze	Abdelrahim Hamed	Powerlifting	Men's +100 kg

== See also ==
- Libya at the Paralympics
- Libya at the 2000 Summer Olympics
