= Asmahan Farhat =

Libyan swimmer (born 1990)

Personal information
- Born: Mercedes Farhat; May 1, 1990 (age 36) Strongsville, Ohio, USA

Sport
- Sport: Swimming

Asmahan Farhat (born Mercedes Farhat on May 1, 1990) is a Libyan-American swimmer.

Born in Strongsville, Ohio, a suburb of Cleveland, she began training with the Lake Erie Silver Dolphins before moving down to Marco Island, Florida at age 11, where she began swimming with her father for the local swim team and with her sister at the YMCA. She graduated from Lely High School in 2008, and broke numerous school and conference records while taking home district and regional titles during her time at the high school. In 2005, Farhat's father, Kamal, convinced her to swim for Libya. As a result, she changed her name to Asmahan (in honor of her aunt) and applied for dual citizenship.

Farhat represented Libya at the 2008 Summer Olympics in Beijing. She was the fourth woman ever to swim for Libya at the Olympic Games, following Amira Edrahi at the 2004 Summer Olympics and Nadia Fezzani and Soad Fezzani in the 1980 Summer Olympics in Moscow. She won her heat in the women's 100 metre breaststroke event, with a time of 1:21.68, but finished 47th overall and did not advance. Her time was a new personal best.

She began studying at the University of Florida a few days after competing in Beijing, and became a sister of Alpha Omicron Pi sorority. She is also a member of the Florida Cicerones.

In Fall of 2012 she began the Doctor of Pharmacy Program at University of Colorado Anschutz Medical Campus. She graduated as a Doctor of Pharmacy in 2016 and continued her career at Walgreens.

== See also ==
- Florida Gators
- List of University of Florida Olympians
