= Libya at the 2016 Summer Olympics =

- IOC code: LBA
- NOC: Libyan Olympic Committee
- Website: olympic.ly (in Arabic)

in Rio de Janeiro
- Competitors: 7 in 6 sports
- Flag bearer: Mohamed Fuad Hrezi
- Medals: Gold 0 Silver 0 Bronze 0 Total 0

Summer Olympics appearances (overview)
- 1964; 1968; 1972–1976; 1980; 1984; 1988; 1992; 1996; 2000; 2004; 2008; 2012; 2016; 2020; 2024

Libya competed at the 2016 Summer Olympics in Rio de Janeiro, Brazil, from 5 to 21 August 2016. This was the nation's eleventh appearance at the Olympics since its debut at the 1964 Summer Olympics in Tokyo; seven of them were represented by the Libyan athletes under the name Libyan Arab Jamahiriya.

Libyan Olympic Committee sent a total of seven athletes, six men and one woman, to compete in six sports at the Games; all of them made their Olympic debut in Rio de Janeiro. Notable Libyan athletes were breaststroke swimmer Daniah Hagul, the lone female and the youngest of the team (aged 17), and marathon runner Mohamed Fuad Hrezi, who was awarded the honor of carrying the Libyan flag in the opening ceremony. Libya, however, has yet to win its first ever Olympic medal.

== Archery ==
Libya has received an invitation from the Tripartite Commission to send a male archer to the Olympic tournament, signifying the nation's Olympic debut in the sport.

Athlete	Event	Ranking round		Round of 64	Round of 32	Round of 16	Quarterfinals	Semifinals	Final / BM	
Athlete	Event	Score	Seed	Opposition Score	Opposition Score	Opposition Score	Opposition Score	Opposition Score	Opposition Score	Rank
Ali El-Ghrari	Men's individual	568	63	Ellison (USA); L 0–6	Did not advance					

== Athletics (track and field) ==
Libyan athletes have so far achieved qualifying standards in the following athletics events (up to a maximum of 3 athletes in each event):

Key

- Note–Ranks given for track events are within the athlete's heat only
- Q = Qualified for the next round
- q = Qualified for the next round as a fastest loser or, in field events, by position without achieving the qualifying target
- NR = National record
- N/A = Round not applicable for the event
- Bye = Athlete not required to compete in round

Track & road events

Athlete	Event	Final	
Athlete	Event	Result	Rank
Mohamed Fuad Hrezi	Men's marathon	2:21:17	77

== Judo ==
Libya has qualified one judoka for the men's extra-lightweight category (60 kg) at the Games. Mohamed El-Kawisah earned a continental quota spot from the African region, as the highest-ranked Libyan judoka outside of direct qualifying position in the IJF World Ranking List of May 30, 2016.

Athlete	Event	Round of 64	Round of 32	Round of 16	Quarterfinals	Semifinals	Repechage	Final / BM	
Athlete	Event	Opposition Result	Opposition Result	Opposition Result	Opposition Result	Opposition Result	Opposition Result	Opposition Result	Rank
Mohamed El-Kawisah	Men's −60 kg	Bye	Smetov (KAZ); L 000–100	Did not advance					

== Rowing ==
Libya has received an invitation from the Tripartite Commission to send a rower in the men's single sculls to the Rio regatta, signifying the nation's Olympic debut in the sport.

Athlete	Event	Heats		Repechage		Quarterfinals		Semifinals		Final	
Athlete	Event	Time	Rank	Time	Rank	Time	Rank	Time	Rank	Time	Rank
Al-Hussein Gambour	Men's single sculls	7:43.85	5 R	7:45.09	4 SE/F	Bye		8:13.17	4 FF	7:41.77	32

Qualification Legend: FA=Final A (medal); FB=Final B (non-medal); FC=Final C (non-medal); FD=Final D (non-medal); FE=Final E (non-medal); FF=Final F (non-medal); SA/B=Semifinals A/B; SC/D=Semifinals C/D; SE/F=Semifinals E/F; QF=Quarterfinals; R=Repechage

== Swimming ==
Libya has received a Universality invitation from FINA to send two swimmers (one male and one female) to the Olympics.

Athlete	Event	Heat		Semifinal		Final	
Athlete	Event	Time	Rank	Time	Rank	Time	Rank
Ahmed Attellesey	Men's 50 m freestyle	23.89	53	Did not advance			
Daniah Hagul	Women's 100 m breaststroke	1:25:47	43	Did not advance			

== Taekwondo ==
Libya entered one athlete into the taekwondo competition at the Olympics for the first time since 2004. Yousef Shriha secured a spot in the men's flyweight category (58 kg) by virtue of his top two finish at the 2016 African Qualification Tournament in Agadir, Morocco.

Athlete	Event	Round of 16	Quarterfinals	Semifinals	Repechage	Final / BM	
Athlete	Event	Opposition Result	Opposition Result	Opposition Result	Opposition Result	Opposition Result	Rank
Yousef Shriha	Men's −58 kg	Navarro (MEX); L 9–23 PTG	Did not advance				
