= Adili =

Adili is a surname. Notable people with the surname include:

- Adel Adili (born 1974), Libyan long-distance runner
- Endoğan Adili (born 1994), Swiss footballer
- Golnar Adili (born 1976), Iranian-born American multidisciplinary artist
- Mevlan Adili (born 1994), Macedonian footballer
