= Libya at the 2009 World Championships in Athletics =

- WA code: LBA

in Berlin
- Competitors: 2 (both male)
- Medals: Gold 0 Silver 0 Bronze 0 Total 0

World Championships in Athletics appearances
- 1983; 1987–1995; 1997; 1999; 2001; 2003; 2005; 2007; 2009; 2011; 2013; 2015; 2017–2022; 2023

Libya competed at the 2009 World Championships in Athletics from 15–23 August 2009 in Berlin. Two Libyan athletes were sent to the championships, but marathon runner El Zaidi did not start at his event.

== Team selection ==
Track and road events

Event	Athletes	
Event	Men	Women
400 metres	Mohamed Khouaja	
Marathon	Ali Mabrouk El Zaidi	

== Results ==
=== Men ===
Track and road events

Event	Athletes	Heat Round 1		Heat Round 2		Semifinal		Final	
Event	Athletes	Result	Rank	Result	Rank	Result	Rank	Result	Rank
400 m	Mohamed Khouaja	45.56 NR	17 q	-		46.43	22	did not advance	
Marathon	Ali Mabrouk El Zaidi	-						DNS	
