= Libya at the 2011 World Championships in Athletics =

- WA code: LBA
- National federation: Libyan Athletics Federation
- Website: www.laf.net.ly

in Daegu
- Competitors: 1
- Medals: Gold 0 Silver 0 Bronze 0 Total 0

World Championships in Athletics appearances
- 1983; 1987–1995; 1997; 1999; 2001; 2003; 2005; 2007; 2009; 2011; 2013; 2015; 2017–2022; 2023

Libya competed at the 2011 World Championships in Athletics from August 27 to September 4 in Daegu, South Korea as the host nation. One athlete, marathon runner Ali Mabrouk El Zaidi, appeared in the Official Start List to represent the country in the event.

== Results ==
=== Men ===
Athlete	Event	Preliminaries		Heats		Semifinals		Final	
Athlete	Event	Time Width Height	Rank	Time Width Height	Rank	Time Width Height	Rank	Time Width Height	Rank
Ali Mabrouk El Zaidi	Marathon							DNF	
