= Libya at the 1996 Summer Paralympics =

- IPC code: LBA
- NPC: Libyan Paralympic Committee
- Website: www.paralympic.ly

in Atlanta
- Competitors: 4 in 1 sport
- Medals: Gold 0 Silver 0 Bronze 0 Total 0

Summer Paralympics appearances (overview)
- 1996; 2000; 2004; 2008; 2012; 2016; 2020; 2024

Libya (Great Socialist People's Libyan Arab Jamahiriya) made its Paralympic Games début at the 1996 Summer Paralympics in Atlanta. They were represented by four powerlifters, none of whom won a medal.

== Team ==
Libya made their Paralympic debut in Atlanta. The country sent four male representatives to compete in powerlifting. These athletes included A. Almaghrabi, Abdelsalam Gharsa, Salem Salem, and Abdelrahim Hamed. Their participation would peak at the 2000 Games before dropping off.

== Powerlifting ==
A. Almaghrabi recorded no mark in the up to 48 kg category. Abdelsalam Gharsa lifted 157.5 kg in the up to 60 kg event, finishing 7th of 13 competitors. Salem Salem lifted 120 kg in the up to 67.5 kg category, placing 20th out of 23. And in the over 100 kg event, Abdelrahim Hamed lifted 215 kg, finishing 5th out of 13. Thus, no Libyan competitor won a medal.

== See also ==
- Libya at the Paralympics
- Libya at the 1996 Summer Olympics
