= Libya at the 2020 Summer Olympics =

- IOC code: LBA
- NOC: Libyan Olympic Committee
- Website: olympic.ly (in Arabic)

in Tokyo, Japan July 23, 2021 – August 8, 2021
- Competitors: 4 in 4 sports
- Flag bearer (opening): Alhussein Ghambour
- Flag bearer (closing): Ali Omar
- Medals: Gold 0 Silver 0 Bronze 0 Total 0

Summer Olympics appearances (overview)
- 1964; 1968; 1972–1976; 1980; 1984; 1988; 1992; 1996; 2000; 2004; 2008; 2012; 2016; 2020; 2024

Libya competed at the 2020 Summer Olympics in Tokyo. Originally scheduled to take place from 24 July to 9 August 2020, the Games were postponed to 23 July to 8 August 2021, because of the COVID-19 pandemic. It was the nation's twelfth appearance at the Summer Olympics since its debut at the 1964 Summer Olympics in Tokyo; seven of them were represented by the Libyan athletes under the name Libyan Arab Jamahiriya.

== Competitors ==
The following is the list of number of competitors in the Games.

Sport	Men	Women	Total
Athletics	0	1	1
Judo	1	0	1
Rowing	1	0	1
Swimming	1	0	1
Total	3	1	4

== Athletics ==
Libya received a universality slot from the World Athletics to send a female track and field athlete to the Olympics.

Key

- Note–Ranks given for track events are within the athlete's heat only
- Q = Qualified for the next round
- q = Qualified for the next round as a fastest loser or, in field events, by position without achieving the qualifying target
- NR = National record
- N/A = Round not applicable for the event
- Bye = Athlete not required to compete in round

Track & road events

Athlete	Event	Heat		Quarterfinal		Semifinal		Final	
Athlete	Event	Result	Rank	Result	Rank	Result	Rank	Result	Rank
Hadel Aboud	Women's 100 m	12.70 PB	5	Did not advance					

== Judo ==
Libya qualified one judoka for the men's heavyweight category (+100 kg) at the Games. Ali Omar accepted a continental berth from Africa as the nation's top-ranked judoka outside of direct qualifying position in the IJF World Ranking List of June 28, 2021.

Athlete	Event	Round of 32	Round of 16	Quarterfinals	Semifinals	Repechage	Final / BM	
Athlete	Event	Opposition Result	Opposition Result	Opposition Result	Opposition Result	Opposition Result	Opposition Result	Rank
Ali Omar	Men's +100 kg	Simionescu (ROU); L 00–10	Did not advance					

== Rowing ==
Libya qualified one boat in the men's single sculls for the Games by topping the field in the B-final and securing the last of five berths available at the 2019 FISA African Olympic Qualification Regatta in Tunis, Tunisia.

Athlete	Event	Heats		Repechage		Quarterfinals		Semifinals		Final	
Athlete	Event	Time	Rank	Time	Rank	Time	Rank	Time	Rank	Time	Rank
Al-Hussein Gambour	Men's single sculls	7:52.37	5 R	7:57.88	4 SE/F	Bye		7:55.98	3 FE	7:47.64	29

Qualification Legend: FA=Final A (medal); FB=Final B (non-medal); FC=Final C (non-medal); FD=Final D (non-medal); FE=Final E (non-medal); FF=Final F (non-medal); SA/B=Semifinals A/B; SC/D=Semifinals C/D; SE/F=Semifinals E/F; QF=Quarterfinals; R=Repechage

== Swimming ==
Libya received a universality invitation from FINA to send a top-ranked male swimmer in his respective individual events to the Olympics, based on the FINA Points System of June 28, 2021.

Athlete	Event	Heat		Semifinal		Final	
Athlete	Event	Time	Rank	Time	Rank	Time	Rank
Audai Hassouna	Men's 200 m freestyle	1:56.27	39	Did not advance			
