= Libya at the 2012 Summer Olympics =

- IOC code: LBA
- NOC: Libyan Olympic Committee
- Website: olympic.ly (in Arabic)

in London
- Competitors: 5 in 4 sports
- Flag bearers: Sofyan El Gadi (opening); Hala Gezah (closing)
- Medals: Gold 0 Silver 0 Bronze 0 Total 0

Summer Olympics appearances (overview)
- 1964; 1968; 1972–1976; 1980; 1984; 1988; 1992; 1996; 2000; 2004; 2008; 2012; 2016; 2020; 2024

Libya competed at the 2012 Summer Olympics in London, United Kingdom from 27 July to 12 August 2012. This was the nation's tenth appearance at the Olympics since its debut at the 1964 Summer Olympics in Tokyo, including seven appearances under the name Libyan Arab Jamahiriya.

Five Libyan athletes were selected to the team, competing only in 4 different sports. Weightlifter Al El-Kekli, however, later withdrew from the Olympic games over an unspecified injury. Swimmer Sofyan El Gadi, the youngest athlete of the team, at age 20, was the nation's flag bearer at the opening ceremony. Libya, however, has yet to win its first ever Olympic medal.

== Athletics ==
Libyan athletes have so far achieved qualifying standards in the following athletics events (up to a maximum of 3 athletes in each event at the 'A' Standard, and 1 at the 'B' Standard):

Key

- Note – Ranks given for track events are within the athlete's heat only
- Q = Qualified for the next round
- q = Qualified for the next round as a fastest loser or, in field events, by position without achieving the qualifying target
- NR = National record
- N/A = Round not applicable for the event
- Bye = Athlete not required to compete in round

Men

Athlete	Event	Final	
Athlete	Event	Result	Rank
Ali Mabrouk El Zaidi	Marathon	DNF	

Women

Athlete	Event	Heat		Quarterfinal		Semifinal		Final	
Athlete	Event	Result	Rank	Result	Rank	Result	Rank	Result	Rank
Hala Gezah	100 m	13.24	5	Did not advance					

== Judo ==
Athlete	Event	Round of 64	Round of 32	Round of 16	Quarterfinals	Semifinals	Repechage	Final / BM	
Athlete	Event	Opposition Result	Opposition Result	Opposition Result	Opposition Result	Opposition Result	Opposition Result	Opposition Result	Rank
Ahmed Yousef Elkawiseh	Men's −66 kg	Bye	Farmonov (UZB); L 0002–1011	Did not advance					

== Swimming ==
Men

Athlete	Event	Heat		Semifinal		Final	
Athlete	Event	Time	Rank	Time	Rank	Time	Rank
Sofyan El Gadi	100 m butterfly	56.99	40	Did not advance			

== Weightlifting ==
Libya has qualified 1 athlete.

Athlete	Event	Snatch		Clean & jerk		Total	Rank
Athlete	Event	Result	Rank	Result	Rank	Total	Rank
Ali Elkekli	Men's −85 kg	Did not compete					
