= Libya at the 1992 Summer Olympics =

- IOC code: LBA
- NOC: Libyan Olympic Committee

in Barcelona
- Competitors: 5 in 4 sports
- Medals: Gold 0 Silver 0 Bronze 0 Total 0

Summer Olympics appearances (overview)
- 1964; 1968; 1972–1976; 1980; 1984; 1988; 1992; 1996; 2000; 2004; 2008; 2012; 2016; 2020; 2024

Libya (Great Socialist People's Libyan Arab Jamahiriya) competed at the 1992 Summer Olympics in Barcelona, Spain.

== Competitors ==
The following is the list of number of competitors in the Games.

Sport	Men	Women	Total
Athletics	1	0	1
Judo	2	0	2
Table tennis	1	0	1
Weightlifting	1	–	1
Total	5	0	5

== Athletics ==
Men
Track and road events

Athlete	Event	Heats		Quarterfinal		Semifinal		Final	
Athlete	Event	Result	Rank	Result	Rank	Result	Rank	Result	Rank
Mohamed Khamis Taher	Marathon	—						2:35:46	75

== Judo ==
Men

Athlete	Event	Round of 64	Round of 32	Round of 16	Quarterfinals	Semifinals	Repechage			Final	
Athlete	Event	Round of 64	Round of 32	Round of 16	Quarterfinals	Semifinals	Round 1	Round 2	Round 3	Final	
Athlete	Event	Opposition Result	Opposition Result	Opposition Result	Opposition Result	Opposition Result	Opposition Result	Opposition Result	Opposition Result	Opposition Result	Rank
Said Masoud El-Agimi	65 kg	Gao (CHN); L	Did not advance								
Yahia Gregni	78 kg	Rakotomalala (MAD); L	Did not advance								

== Table tennis ==
Men

Athlete	Event	Group Stage				Round of 16	Quarterfinal	Semifinal	Final	
Athlete	Event	Opposition Result	Opposition Result	Opposition Result	Rank	Opposition Result	Opposition Result	Opposition Result	Opposition Result	Rank
Attaher Mohamed El-Mahjoub	Singles	Ri (PRK); L 0–2	Lupulesku (IOP); L 0–2	Olaleye (NGR); L 0–2	4	Did not advance				

== Weightlifting ==
Athlete	Event	Snatch		Clean & jerk		Total	Rank
Athlete	Event	Result	Rank	Result	Rank	Total	Rank
Mustafa Ahshad	+110 kg	140.0	19	165.0	18	305.0	18
