= Francisco Guzmán =

Francisco Guzmán may refer to:

- Francisco Guzmán (shot putter) (born 1978), Mexican shot putter
- Francisco Pérez de Guzmán (1889–1970), Spanish footballer
- Pancho Guzmán (J. Francisco Guzmán, born 1946), Ecuadorian former tennis player
- Francisco Guzmán (race walker), Salvadoran race walker
- Francisco Guzman (weightlifter) (born 1967), Dominican Republic weightlifter

== See also ==
- Francisca Guzmán (born 1981), Chilean athlete
