= Olusola Awosina =

Nigerian weightlifter (born 1970)

Personal information
- Nationality: Nigerian
- Born: 2 October 1970 (age 54)

Sport
- Sport: Weightlifting

Olusola Awosina (born 2 October 1970) is a Nigerian weightlifter. He competed in the men's middle heavyweight event at the 1988 Summer Olympics.
