= Roland Feldhoffer =

German weightlifter

Personal information
- Nationality: German
- Born: 8 July 1962 (age 62); Heidelberg, Germany

Sport
- Sport: Weightlifting

Roland Feldhoffer (born 8 July 1962) is a German weightlifter. He competed in the men's middle heavyweight event at the 1988 Summer Olympics.
