= Libya at the 1968 Summer Olympics =

- IOC code: LBA
- NOC: Libyan Olympic Committee

in Mexico City
- Competitors: 1 in 1 sport
- Medals: Gold 0 Silver 0 Bronze 0 Total 0

Summer Olympics appearances (overview)
- 1964; 1968; 1972–1976; 1980; 1984; 1988; 1992; 1996; 2000; 2004; 2008; 2012; 2016; 2020; 2024

Libya (Kingdom of Libya) competed with one person at the 1968 Summer Olympics in Mexico City, Mexico.

== Results by event ==
=== Athletics ===
Men's 400 metres hurdles

- Mohamed Asswai Khalifa

- Round 1 — 54.3 s (→ did not advance, 28th place from 28 competitors)
