= Suleman Juma =

Kenyan weightlifter

Personal information
- Nationality: Kenyan
- Born: 23 June 1960 (age 64)

Sport
- Sport: Weightlifting

Suleman Juma (born 23 June 1960) is a Kenyan weightlifter. He competed in the men's middle heavyweight event at the 1988 Summer Olympics.
