= Athletics at the 2003 All-Africa Games – Men's marathon =

The men's marathon at the 2003 All-Africa Games was held on October 16. This was the last time this event was contested at All-Africa Games as it was replaced with the half marathon from the next edition on.

== Results ==
Rank	Name	Nationality	Time	Notes
1st place, gold medalist(s)	Johannes Kekana	South Africa	2:25:01	
2nd place, silver medalist(s)	Gashaw Melese	Ethiopia	2:26:08	
3rd place, bronze medalist(s)	Gudisa Shentema	Ethiopia	2:27.39	
4	Simon Mphulanyane	South Africa	2:30:18	
5	Abel Chimukoko	Zimbabwe	2:30:20	
6	Henry Moyo	Malawi	2:32:06	
7	Ernest Ndjissipou	Central African Republic	2:32:31	
8	João N'Tyamba	Angola	2:33:19	
9	Ndabili Bashingili	Botswana	2:33:21	
10	Tesfahiwet Tekie	Eritrea	2:34:11	
11	Francis Naali	Tanzania	2:35:14	
12	John Kayange	Malawi	2:40:42	
13	Francis Khanje	Malawi	2:44:21	
14	Adel Edeli	Libya	2:44:37	
15	Ngoie Nkulu	Democratic Republic of the Congo	2:45:03	
16	Danjuma Monday	Nigeria	2:54:53	
17	Gideon Hagak	Nigeria	3:04:03	
	Dawit Mebrahtu	Eritrea	DNF	
	Stanley Kagora	Kenya	DNF	
	Amus Nengark	Nigeria	DNF	
	Josiah Bembe	South Africa	DNF	
	François Bagambiki	Rwanda	DNF	
	Jean Bosco Ndagijimana	Rwanda	DNF	
	Tendai Chimusasa	Zimbabwe	DNF	
