= Germán Tozdjián =

Uruguayan weightlifter

Personal information
- Nationality: Uruguayan
- Born: 8 December 1964 (age 60)

Sport
- Sport: Weightlifting

Germán Tozdjián (born 8 December 1964) is a Uruguayan weightlifter. He competed in the men's middle heavyweight event at the 1988 Summer Olympics.
