= Attila Buda =

Hungarian weightlifter

Personal information
- Nationality: Hungarian
- Born: 16 August 1964 (age 60); Méra, Hungary

Sport
- Sport: Weightlifting

Attila Buda (born 16 August 1964) is a Hungarian weightlifter. He competed in the men's middle heavyweight event at the 1988 Summer Olympics.
