= Weightlifting at the 1988 Summer Olympics – Men's 90 kg =

Weightlifting at the Olympics

Men's 90 kg at the Games of the XXIV Olympiad
- Venue: Olympic Weightlifting Gymnasium
- Date: 25 September 1988
- Competitors: 28 from 22 nations
- Winning total: 412.5 kg OR

Medalists
1st place, gold medalist(s)		Anatoly Khrapaty	Soviet Union
2nd place, silver medalist(s)		Nail Mukhamedyarov	Soviet Union
3rd place, bronze medalist(s)		Sławomir Zawada	Poland

The men's 90 kg weightlifting competitions at the 1988 Summer Olympics in Seoul took place on 25 September at the Olympic Weightlifting Gymnasium. It was the tenth appearance of the middle heavyweight class.

== Results ==
Rank	Name	Country	kg
1	Anatoly Khrapaty	Soviet Union	412.5
2	Nail Mukhamedyarov	Soviet Union	400.0
3	Sławomir Zawada	Poland	400.0
4	Andrzej Piotrowski	Poland	365.0
5	Attila Buda	Hungary	360.0
6	David Mercer	Great Britain	357.5
7	Roland Feldhoffer	West Germany	350.0
8	Keith Boxell	Great Britain	350.0
9	Zoltán Balázsfi	Hungary	345.0
10	Guy Greavette	Canada	337.5
11	Arn Kritsky	United States	332.5
12	Olusola Awosina	Nigeria	332.5
13	Jeon Byeong-guk	South Korea	330.0
14	Brett Brian	United States	320.0
15	Mohamed Fayad	Syria	320.0
16	Per Larsen	Denmark	317.5
17	Ramón Solis	Philippines	317.5
18	Francisco Guzman	Dominican Republic	312.5
19	Hassan El-Kaissi	Lebanon	307.5
20	Ahmed El-Magrisi	Libya	307.5
21	Emilson Dantas	Brazil	300.0
22	Suleman Juma	Kenya	265.0
23	Hernán Cortez	Bolivia	250.0
24	Ali Kavuma	Uganda	232.5
25	Joseph Kauvai	Cook Islands	200.0
AC	Germán Tozdjián	Uruguay	140.0
AC	Abdullah Mussa	Libya	DNF
AC	Mahmoud Mahgoub	Egypt	DNF
