= Libya at the 1964 Summer Olympics =

- IOC code: LBA (LYA used at these Games)
- NOC: Libyan Olympic Committee

in Tokyo
- Competitors: 1 in 1 sport
- Medals: Gold 0 Silver 0 Bronze 0 Total 0

Summer Olympics appearances (overview)
- 1964; 1968; 1972–1976; 1980; 1984; 1988; 1992; 1996; 2000; 2004; 2008; 2012; 2016; 2020; 2024

Libya (Kingdom of Libya) competed in the Summer Olympic Games for the first time at the 1964 Summer Olympics in Tokyo, Japan.

Their only competitor at the games, Suliman Fighi Hassan entered the men's marathon, but did not start the race.
