= Ahmed Mohamed Sallouma =

Libyan sprinter (born 1959)

Personal information
- Nationality: Libyan
- Born: 1959
- Died: September 2017 (aged 57–58)

Sport
- Sport: Sprinting
- Event: 200 metres
Medal record
Men's athletics
Representing Libya
Maghreb Championships
Silver medal – second place	1983 Casablanca	4 × 100 m relay

Ahmed Mohamed Sallouma (Arabic: أحمد محمد سلوما; 1959–12 September 2017) was a Libyan sprinter. He competed in the men's 200 metres and 4 × 400 metres relay at the 1980 Summer Olympics.

Sallouma was a multiple-time Libyan Athletics Championships winner and was considered one of the stars of the Libyan Military Federation in sprinting. In 1978, Sallouma set his 200 m personal best of 22.30 seconds.

On 20 June 1979, Sallouma set the Libyan national 100 metres record at a meeting in Sofia, Bulgaria. His automatic time of 10.74 seconds was not broken until 2014, when Mohamed El Shoushan ran 10.56 seconds.

Sallouma was selected to represent Libya in both the 200 m and 4 × 400 m at the 1980 Olympics. In the second 200 m heat, he ran 22.88 seconds to finish 6th and did not advance. Three days later Sallouma ran the 4th leg on the Libyan 4 × 400 metres relay team, recording a time of 3:16.7 for 6th in their heat.

Three years later, Sallouma set his 400 m best of 49.29 seconds at another athletics meeting. He represented Libya again at the 1983 Mediterranean Games in Morocco. At the 1983 Maghreb Athletics Championships, Sallouma won the silver medal in the 4 × 100 m relay for Libya, winning their only medal in 1983 and their last ever medal at the championships.

Sallouma died on 12 September 2017 at age 58.
