= Ahmed Belgasem =

Libyan cyclist (born 1987)

Personal information
- Full name: Ahmed Youssef Belgasem
- Born: 15 October 1987 (age 39)
- Height: 1.65 m (5 ft 5 in)
- Weight: 68 kg (150 lb)

Cycling career
- Sport: Cycling
- Discipline: Road cycling
- Role: Rider

Professional team
- 2011: Pendragon-Colnago-Le Col

Major wins
- 2010 Tour of Libya

Ahmed Youssef Belgasem (Arabic: أحمد يوسف بالقاسم; born October 15, 1987) is a Libyan road racing cyclist. He represented Libyan Arab Jamahiriya (now Libya) at the 2008 Summer Olympics in Beijing, where he competed in the men's road race. Belgasem, however, did not finish the run, before reaching the 150.2 km lap of the course. In 2010, Belgasem won his first ever career title at the third annual Tour of Libya.
