= Mustafa Ahshad =

Libyan weightlifter (born 1970)

Personal information
- Nationality: Libya
- Born: 20 December 1970 (age 54)
- Weight: 113 kg (249 lb)

Sport
- Sport: Weightlifting

Mustafa Ahshad (born 20 December 1970) is a Libyan weightlifter. He competed in the 1992 Summer Olympics.
