= Sport in Libya =

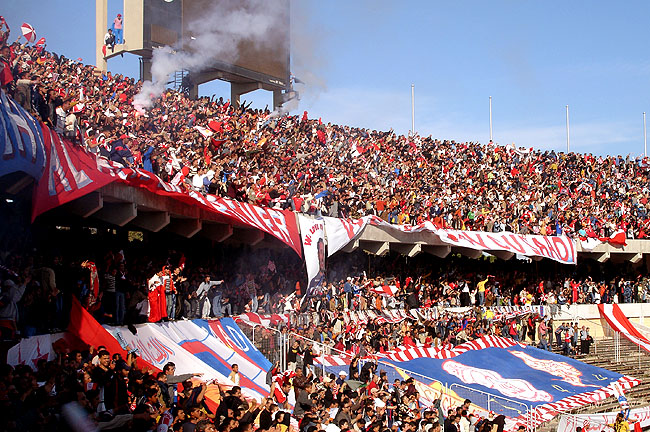
Fans cheering during a football match at the Tripoli Stadium

The most popular sport in Libya is football.

Libya has also hosted some international sports tournaments, including the FIDE World Chess Championship 2004 and 2008 African Futsal Championship.

== History ==
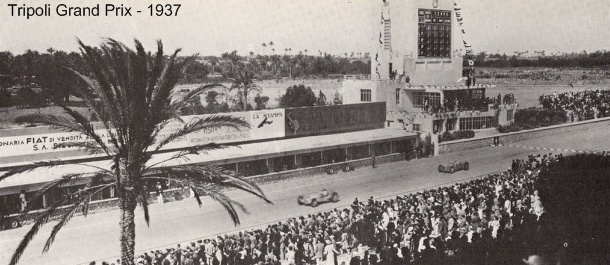
1937 Tripoli Grand Prix

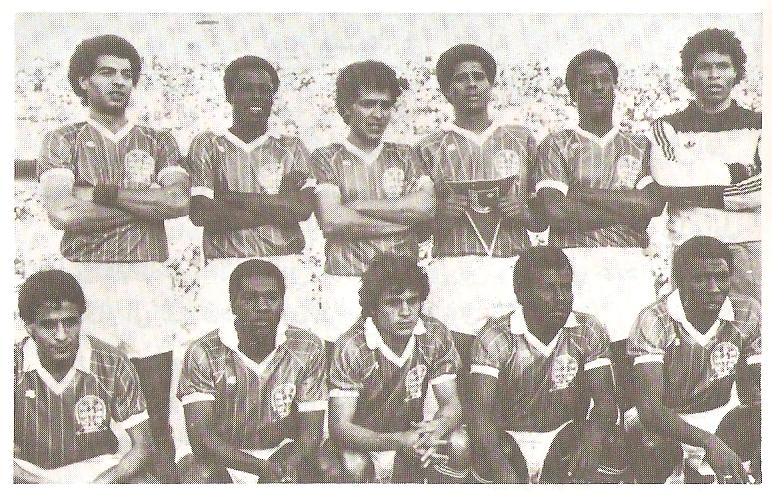
Libya national football team, 1988

Football and motor racing were popular sports played in Italian Libya.

Due to the Libyan crisis, international sports, most notably football were not played in Libya for several years.

== By sport ==
=== Other sports ===
Extreme sports, such as skateboarding and motorcycle racing are played in Libya. However, the Libyan Association of Extreme Sports is unrecognised by the government and such sports receive no funding.
