= Libya at the 2024 Summer Olympics =

- IOC code: LBA
- NOC: Libyan Olympic Committee
- Website: olympic.ly (in Arabic)

in Paris, France 26 July 2021 – 11 August 2021
- Competitors: 6 (5 men and 1 woman) in 5 sports
- Flag bearers: Ahmed Abuzriba; Maleek Al-Mukhtar
- Medals: Gold 0 Silver 0 Bronze 0 Total 0

Summer Olympics appearances (overview)
- 1964; 1968; 1972–1976; 1980; 1984; 1988; 1992; 1996; 2000; 2004; 2008; 2012; 2016; 2020; 2024

Libya competed at the 2024 Summer Olympics in Paris from 26 July to 11 August 2024. It was the nation's thirteenth appearance at the Summer Olympics, since the nation's official debut at 1964.

== Competitors ==
The following is the list of number of competitors in the Games.

Sport	Men	Women	Total
Athletics	1	0	1
Rowing	1	0	1
Shooting	1	0	1
Swimming	1	1	2
Weightlifting	1	0	1
Total	5	1	6

== Athletics ==
Libya sent one sprinter to compete at the 2024 Summer Olympics.

Key

- Note–Ranks given for track events are within the athlete's heat only
- Q = Qualified for the next round
- q = Qualified for the next round as a fastest loser or, in field events, by position without achieving the qualifying target
- NR = National record
- N/A = Round not applicable for the event
- Bye = Athlete not required to compete in round

Track events

Athlete	Event	Preliminary		Heat		Repechage		Semifinal		Final	
Athlete	Event	Time	Rank	Time	Rank	Time	Rank	Time	Rank	Time	Rank
Ahmed Essabai	Men's 100 m	11.89	8	Did not advance		—		Did not advance			

== Rowing ==
Libya entered one boat in the men's single sculls competitions for the Games. Mohamed Bukrah directly secured his spots for the nations through the allocation process of universality spots.

Athlete	Event	Heats		Repechage		Quarterfinals		Semifinals		Final	
Athlete	Event	Time	Rank	Time	Rank	Time	Rank	Time	Rank	Time	Rank
Mohamed Bukrah	Men's single sculls	7:37.75	5 R	7:45.55	5 SE/F	Bye		8:00.42	4 FF	7:28.90	31

Qualification Legend: FA=Final A (medal); FB=Final B (non-medal); FC=Final C (non-medal); FD=Final D (non-medal); FE=Final E (non-medal); FF=Final F (non-medal); SA/B=Semifinals A/B; SC/D=Semifinals C/D; SE/F=Semifinals E/F; QF=Quarterfinals; R=Repechage

== Shooting ==
For the first time in Olympic history, Libyan shooters achieved quota places for the following events based on their results at the 2022 and 2023 ISSF World Championships, 2023 African Championships, and 2024 ISSF World Olympic Qualification Tournament

Athlete	Event	Qualification		Final	
Athlete	Event	Points	Rank	Points	Rank
Mohammed Bin Dallah	Men's 10 m air pistol	555	32	Did not advance	

== Swimming ==
Libya sent two swimmers to compete at the 2024 Paris Olympics.

Athlete	Event	Heat		Semifinal		Final	
Athlete	Event	Time	Rank	Time	Rank	Time	Rank
Yousef Abubaker	Men's 100 m freestyle	56.19	75	Did not advance			
Maleek Al-Mukhtar	Women's 100 m backstroke	1:10.99	36	Did not advance			

== Weightlifting ==
For the first time since the nation's last participation in 2004, Libya entered one weightlifter into the Olympic competition. Ahmed Abuzriba (men's 102 kg) secured one quotas to participate in his weight divisions based on the allocations of universality spots.

Athlete	Event	Snatch		Clean & Jerk		Total	Rank
Athlete	Event	Result	Rank	Result	Rank	Total	Rank
Ahmed Abuzriba	Men's −102 kg	164	DNF				
