= Ghada Ali =

Libyan sprinter (born 1989)

Personal information
- Nationality: Libyan
- Born: 5 May 1989 (age 37)
- Height: 1.66 m (5 ft 5 1/2 in)
- Weight: 67 kg (148 lb)

Sport
- Sport: Athletics
- Event: Sprint

Achievements and titles
- Personal best: 400 m: 1:06.19 (2008)

Ghada Ali (Arabic: غادة علي; born May 5, 1989) is a Libyan sprinter, who specialized in the 400 metres. Ghada Ali represented Libyan Arab Jamahiriya (now Libya) at the 2008 Summer Olympics in Beijing, where she competed for the women's 400 metres. She ran in the fourth heat against six other athletes, including Great Britain's Christine Ohuruogu, who eventually became an Olympic champion in the final. She finished the race in last place by 13 seconds behind Ireland's Joanne Cuddihy, with the slowest record time of 1:06.19. Ali failed to advance into the semi-finals, as she placed 50th overall, and was ranked farther below three mandatory slots for the next round.
