= Mohamed Eshtiwi =

Libyan weightlifter (born 1985)

Personal information
- Born: 2 August 1985 (age 40)
Medal record
Men's Weightlifting
Representing Libya
Mediterranean Games
Gold medal – first place	2005 Almería	Middleweight

Mohamed Eshtiwi (born 2 August 1985) is a weightlifter from Libya. He won the gold medal at the 2005 Mediterranean Games in the Men's Middleweight (– 77 kg) division, and carried the flag for Libya at the 2004 Summer Olympics in Athens, Greece.

Olympic Games
Preceded by Nizar Mohamed Naeeli	Flagbearer for Libya; 2004 Athens	Succeeded by Mohamed Ben Saleh
