= Francisco Guzman (weightlifter) =

Dominican Republic weightlifter

Personal information
- Nationality: Dominican
- Born: 30 March 1967 (age 57)

Sport
- Sport: Weightlifting

Francisco Guzman (born 30 March 1967) is a Dominican Republic weightlifter. He competed in the men's middle heavyweight event at the 1988 Summer Olympics.
