= Libya at the Olympics =

- IOC code: LBA
- NOC: Libyan Olympic Committee
- Website: olympic.ly (in Arabic)
- Medals: Gold 0 Silver 0 Bronze 0 Total 0

Summer appearances
- 1964; 1968; 1972–1976; 1980; 1984; 1988; 1992; 1996; 2000; 2004; 2008; 2012; 2016; 2020; 2024

Libya first participated at the Olympic Games in 1964, and has sent athletes to compete in most Summer Olympic Games since then. The nation boycotted the 1976 Games along with most other African nations, and also boycotted the 1984 Games. The nation has never participated in the Winter Olympic Games.

To date, no Libyan athlete has ever won an Olympic medal.

The National Olympic Committee for Libya was created in 1962 and recognized by the International Olympic Committee in 1963.

== Medal tables ==
=== Medals by Summer Games ===
Games	Athletes	Gold	Silver	Bronze	Total	Rank
1964 Tokyo	(1)	0	0	0	0	–
1968 Mexico City	1	0	0	0	0	–
1972 Munich	did not participate					
1976 Montreal	boycotted					
1980 Moscow	32	0	0	0	0	–
1984 Los Angeles	boycotted					
1988 Seoul	4	0	0	0	0	–
1992 Barcelona	5	0	0	0	0	–
1996 Atlanta	5	0	0	0	0	–
2000 Sydney	3	0	0	0	0	–
2004 Athens	8	0	0	0	0	–
2008 Beijing	6	0	0	0	0	–
2012 London	5	0	0	0	0	–
2016 Rio de Janeiro	7	0	0	0	0	–
2020 Tokyo	4	0	0	0	0	–
2024 Paris	6	0	0	0	0	–
2028 Los Angeles	future event					
2032 Brisbane	future event					
Total		0	0	0	0	–

== See also ==
- List of flag bearers for Libya at the Olympics
- Libya at the Paralympics
