= Per Larsen (weightlifter) =

Danish weightlifter

Personal information
- Nationality: Danish
- Born: 31 May 1962 (age 63); Aalborg, Denmark

Sport
- Sport: Weightlifting

Per Larsen (born 31 May 1962) is a Danish weightlifter. He competed in the men's middle heavyweight event at the 1988 Summer Olympics.
