= Ghazalah Alaqouri =

Libyan Paralympic powerlifter

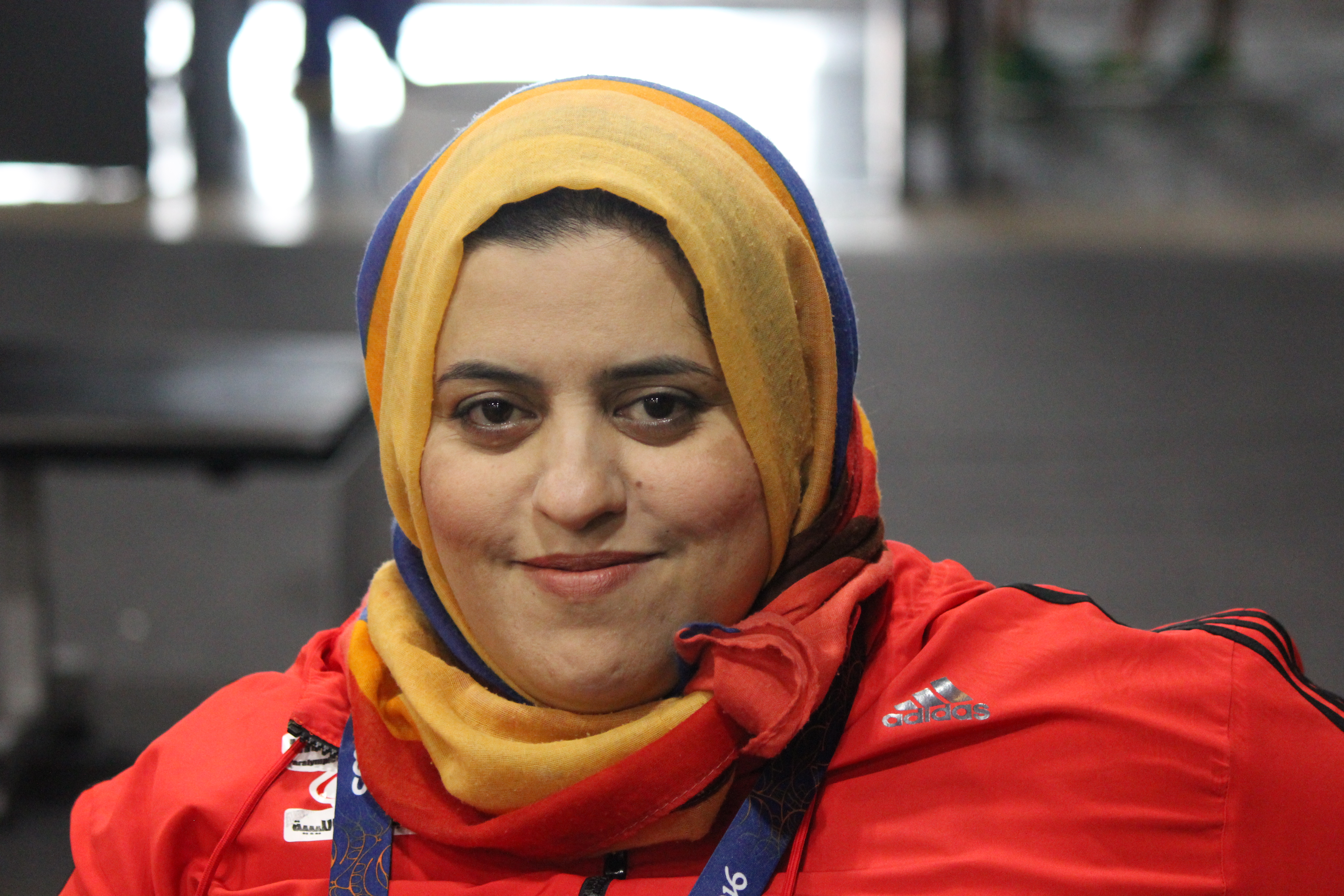
- Alaqouri in Rio in 2016

Personal information
- Nationality: Libyan
- Born: 3 June 1973 (age 52)

Sport
- Country: Libya
- Sport: Powerlifting
- Event: 86 kilogram class
- Updated on 2 October 2025

Ghazalah Alaqouri (born 3 June 1973) is a Libyan powerlifter who competes in the <86 kg class. She competed in the 2016 Summer Paralympics in Rio de Janeiro, Brazil, and the 2024 Summer Paralympics in Paris, France, where she was a flag bearer.

== Life ==
She competed in two Paralympic Games for Libya.
