= Hala Gezah =

Libyan sprinter (born 1989)

Hala Gezah (born 17 September 1989 in Tripoli) is a Libyan sprinter. She competed in the 100 metres competition at the 2012 Summer Olympics in London. She was the only female athlete to compete for Libya at the 2012 Summer Olympics.

== Early life ==
When she was a child, her father, a football player, encouraged her to be an athlete. She practices the Islamic faith.

Gezah's athletic training was interrupted after the dictator of Libya, Muammar Gaddafi, was overthrown. The political change interrupted communication with a local athletic federation and left the Libyan Olympic Committee without funds.

Aside from training as a runner, Gezah also studied science.

== Career ==
Gezah only participated in one competition in 2012 prior to the Olympic games. Her result at the biennial African athletics championships in Benin was not enough to qualify for the Olympic games. Gezah was the only Libyan woman to compete at the 2012 Summer Olympics. Because the International Olympic Committee encourages participation from many countries, Libya was able to send one athlete in athletics and chose Gezah. She was one of only four Libyan athletes to compete in the 2012 Summer Olympics and the only female Libyan athlete to compete. On 3 August 2012, she ran the preliminaries for the women's 100 metres in 13.24 seconds, placing 23 out of 33 wildcard participants, which did not qualify her for Round 1.

Her personal best recorded times in competition are 13.15 seconds in the 100 metres and 27.32 seconds in the 200 metres. Both results were recorded at Porto Novo on 27 June 2012 and 30 June 2012.
