= Nadia Fezzani =

Canadian journalist/author

Nadia Fezzani is a Canadian journalist/author who has conducted extensive research about and interviews with many notorious American serial killers. She is known in Europe as having interviewed American serial killer Richard Cottingham for a French documentary that first aired on TF1, Enquêtes et révélations. The first person to interview Cottingham in 30 years, Fezzani got him to admit his culpability for the first time, as well as many more murders. She is also part of November 84, a documentary about the disappearance of children. More recently, she was interviewed in a Netflix documentary, Crime Scene: The Times Square Killer where she briefly talks about her interview with serial killer Richard Cottingham.

She wrote a book in French, Mes Tueurs en Série, which was a best seller in 2014. Interviews with serial killers and professionals (profilers, criminologists, neurologists, etc.), explain how someone becomes a serial killer, what triggers them, and what could have been done to prevent such behavior. The title of the English edition is Through the Eyes of Serial Killers: Interviews with Seven Murderers and was published by Dundurn Press in March 2015.

Later on, she published a book on real life superheroes, Mission Superhéros, in which she went on patrol with individuals who dress up at night and fight crime. She brings us into their world and provides insights into their psyche through interviews. That book was published in English in September 2017 by Dundurn Press with the title Real Life Super Heroes.

== Life ==
Fezzani conducted interviews with famous athletes for five years and was in charge of media relations for the Montreal Matrix. She also conducted interviews with music stars, such as Def Leppard and Nickelback. She has published in magazines and newspapers including Journal de Montréal, Montreal Metro, 24 Heures, Dernière Heure, UMM, Bobbi, Les Canadiens, Summum, Summum Girl, Hometown Hockey, and Samedi.

As a specialist on serial killers, Ms. Fezzani has given conferences on the topic to university students and various organizations. She has also worked with production companies on television documentaries. As noted, she is the author of Mes tueurs en série (2011). The English edition Through the Eyes of Serial Killers: Interviews with Seven Murderers, with a preface by Dr. Eric Hickey, contains chapters on Arthur Shawcross, Keith Jesperson, Gary G Grant, Joel Rifkin, Richard Cottingham, Jack Trawick, and Patrick Kearney.
