= Tarek Ayad (judoka) =

Libyan judoka (born 1972)

Personal information
- Nationality: Libyan
- Born: 19 October 1972 (age 53)

Sport
- Sport: Judo

Tarek Ayad (born 19 October 1972) is a Libyan judoka. He competed in the men's half-lightweight event at the 2000 Summer Olympics. Although Tarek was born in Libya, he was brought up in Bavaria, Germany. He has a passion for sports and is a recognized trainer focusing on health and fitness.
