= Ahmed El-Magrisi =

Libyan weightlifter (born 1961)

Personal information
- Nationality: Libyan
- Born: 1 December 1961 (age 63)

Sport
- Sport: Weightlifting

Ahmed El-Magrisi (born 1 December 1961) is a Libyan weightlifter. He competed in the men's middle heavyweight event at the 1988 Summer Olympics.
