= Ahmed Zoubi =

Libyan volleyball player

Personal information
- Nationality: Libyan

Sport
- Sport: Volleyball

Ahmed Zoubi is a Libyan volleyball player. He competed in the men's tournament at the 1980 Summer Olympics.
