= Al-Hussein Gambour =

Libyan rower (born 1989)

Al-Hussein Gambour (born 21 August 1989 in Tripoli) is a Libyan rower. He placed 32nd in the men's single sculls event at the 2016 Summer Olympics.

He competed in the men's single sculls event at the 2020 Summer Olympics.

Olympic Games
Preceded by Mohamed Hrezi	Flag bearer for Libya; Tokyo 2020	Succeeded by Mek Almukhtar; Mohamed Bukrah
