= Libya at the Paralympics =

- IPC code: LBA
- NPC: Libyan Paralympic Committee
- Website: www.paralympic.ly
- Medals: Gold 0 Silver 0 Bronze 1 Total 1

Summer appearances
- 1996; 2000; 2004; 2008; 2012; 2016; 2020; 2024

Libya made its Paralympic Games début as the Great Socialist People's Libyan Arab Jamahiriya at the 1996 Summer Paralympics in Atlanta, sending four representatives to compete in powerlifting. The country has competed at every edition of the Summer Paralympics since then, but has never taken part in the Winter Paralympics. Libyan delegations have always been fairly small: three judokas, two powerlifters and a volleyball team in 2000; two powerlifters in 2004; a powerlifter and two table tennis players in 2008.

Libya won its first—and so far only—Paralympic medal when Abdelrahim Hamed took bronze in the men's over 100 kg in powerlifting in 2000, lifting 235 kilograms (518 lb).

== Medal tables ==
=== Medals by Summer Games ===
Games	Athletes	Gold	Silver	Bronze	Total	Rank
1996 Atlanta	4	0	0	0	0	–
2000 Sydney	17	0	0	1	1	64
2004 Athens	2	0	0	0	0	–
2008 Beijing	3	0	0	0	0	–
2012 London	2	0	0	0	0	–
2016 Rio de Janeiro	3	0	0	0	0	-
2020 Tokyo	1	0	0	0	0	-
2024 Paris	3	0	0	0	0	-
Total		0	0	1	1	

=== Medals by Summer sport ===
Sport	Gold	Silver	Bronze	Total
Powerlifting	0	0	1	1
Totals (1 entries)	0	0	1	1

== See also ==
- Libya at the Olympics
