= Mohamed Hrezi =

Libyan marathon runner (born 1991)

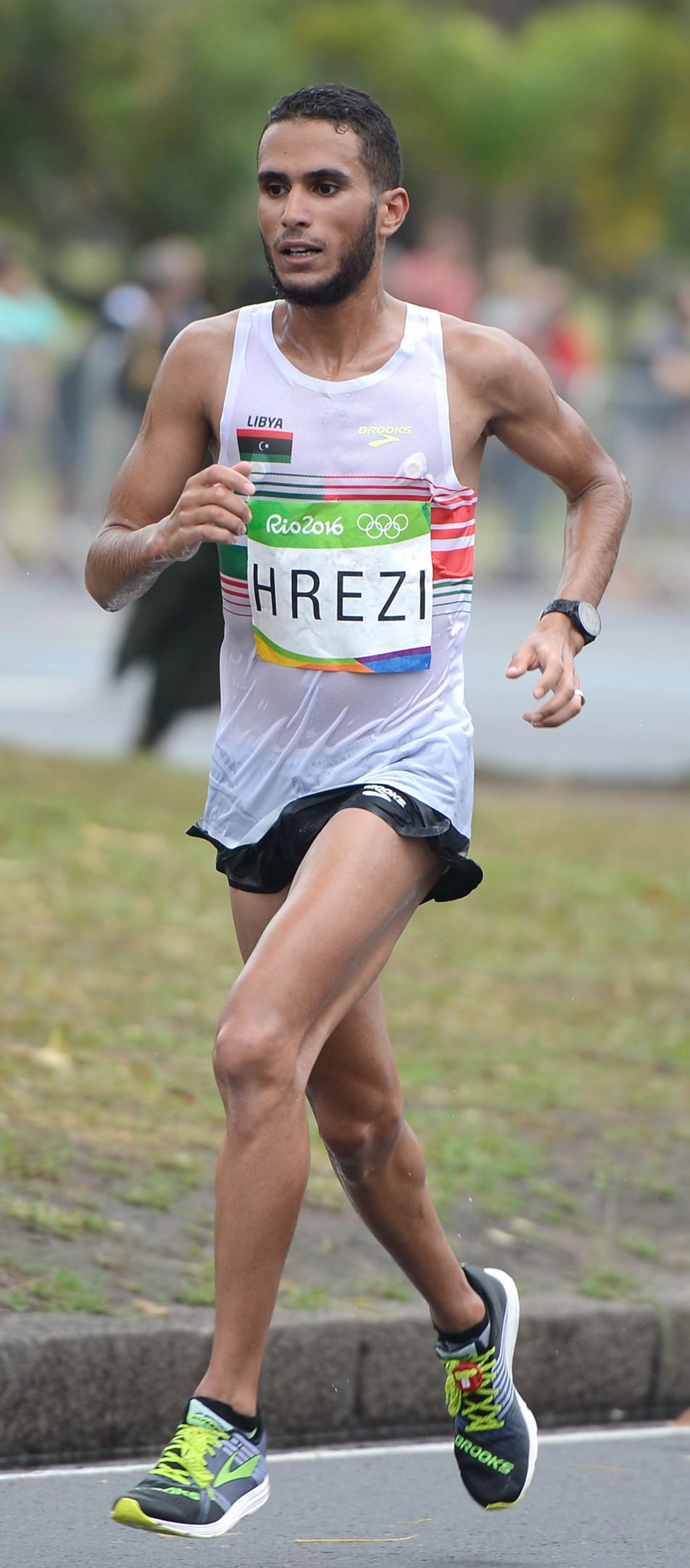
- Hrezi at the 2016 Olympics

Personal information
- Nationality: Libyan, American
- Born: 28 October 1991 (age 34) Naugatuck, Connecticut, U.S.
- Education: Iowa State University; Michigan State University

Sport
- Country: Libya
- Sport: Athletics
- Events: 5000 meters, 10,000 meters, marathon
- Club: Hansons-Brooks ODP
- Coached by: Kevin Hanson

Achievements and titles
- Personal bests: 5000m: 13:34.32 (2022); 10,000m: 28:30.58 (2022, NR); Half-Marathon: 1:02:08 (2022, NR); Marathon: 2:15:22

Mohamed Fuad "Mo" Hrezi (born 28 October 1991) is a Libyan-American marathon runner. He competed at the 2016 Summer Olympics in the marathon and finished in 77th place with a time of 2:21:17. He was the flag bearer for Libya at the Parade of Nations. Hrezi was born and raised in the United States; he qualified to compete for Libya through dual citizenship.

== Running career ==
Hrezi took up cross country running in eighth grade because it was the only sport available. By the time he graduated from Naugatuck High School, he recorded 1:55.45 for 800 meters and 4:28.35 for the mile. After high school, he was a successful distance runner at Iowa State University, and ran 28:51.88 in the men's 10,000 meters at the 2014 Stanford Invitational, finishing in 20th place in a deep field.

After graduating from Iowa State, Hrezi joined the Hansons Brooks racing team from Rochester, Michigan, where he began marathon training. He fulfilled the Olympic standard for the men's marathon at the 2016 Ottawa Race Weekend, finishing seventh in a time of 2:18:40. He earned $2,000 in prize money for the performance. Ramadan started shortly after his breakthrough at Ottawa, and Hrezi fasted while running 100 miles per week in preparation for the Olympics. Since the fast was practiced during daylight, Hrezi did his workouts between 1:30 and 4 in the morning for the duration of Ramadan that year.

At the October 2021 Twin Cities Marathon, Hrezi lowered his personal best marathon time to 2:15:22, en route to a first-place finish.

Olympic Games
Preceded by Sofyan El Gadi	Flagbearer for Libya; 2016 Rio de Janeiro	Succeeded by Al-Hussein Gambour
