= Said Farouk Al-Turki =

Saudi Arabian discus thrower

Personal information
- Nationality: Saudi Arabian
- Born: 27 September 1943 (age 82)

Sport
- Sport: Athletics
- Event: Discus throw

Said Farouk Al-Turki (born 27 September 1943) is a Saudi Arabian athlete. He competed in the men's discus throw at the 1972 Summer Olympics.
