= Audai Hassouna =

Libyan swimmer (born 1998)

Audai Rushdi Hassouna
Personal information
- Nationality: Libyan
- Born: 18 October 1998 (age 26)
- Height: 182 cm (6 ft 0 in)
- Weight: 88 kg (194 lb)

Sport
- Sport: Swimming

Audai Hassouna (born 18 October 1998) is a Libyan swimmer. He competed in the men's 200 metre freestyle at the 2020 Summer Olympics.
