= Mohamed Ben Saleh =

Libyan judoka (born 1981)

Personal information
- Nationality: Libya
- Born: 1 January 1981 (age 45)
Medal record
Men's Judo
Representing Libya
All-Africa Games
Bronze medal – third place	2007 Algiers	100 kg
African Championships
Silver medal – second place	2008 Agadir	100 kg
Bronze medal – third place	2001 Tripoli	90 kg
Bronze medal – third place	2010 Yaoundé	100 kg

Mohamed Ben Saleh (born 1 January 1981) is a Libyan former judoka.

== Major results ==
Year	Tournament	Venue	Result	Event
2001	African Championships	Tripoli, Libya	3rd	Middleweight (90 kg)
2002	African Championships	Cairo, Egypt	7th	Half middleweight (81 kg)
2004	Olympic Games	Athens, Greece	-	Half middleweight (81 kg)
2006	African Championships	Port-Louis, Mauritius	5th	Half heavyweight (100 kg)
2007	All-Africa Games	Algiers, Algeria	3rd	Half heavyweight (100 kg)
2008	African Championships	Agadir, Morocco	2nd	Half heavyweight (100 kg)
2008	Olympic Games	Beijing, China	-	Half heavyweight (100 kg)
2009	African Championships	Port-Louis, Mauritius	5th	Half heavyweight (100 kg)
2010	African Championships	Yaoundé, Cameroon	3rd	Half heavyweight (100 kg)
2011	African Championships	Dakar, Senegal	5th	Half heavyweight (100 kg)

Olympic Games
Preceded by Mohamed Eshtiwi	Flagbearer for Libya; Beijing 2008	Succeeded by Sofyan El Gadi
