= Nizar Mohamed Naeeli =

Libyan taekwondo practitioner (born 1976)

Personal information
- Nationality: Libyan
- Born: 28 May 1976 (age 50)

Sport
- Sport: Taekwondo

Nizar Mohamed Naeeli (born 28 May 1976) is a Libyan taekwondo practitioner. He competed in the men's 68 kg event at the 2000 Summer Olympics.
