= Sofyan El Gadi =

Libyan swimmer (born 1992)

Personal information
- Born: 1 January 1992 (age 34) Tripoli, Libya
- Height: 182 cm (6 ft 0 in)
- Weight: 80 kg (176 lb)

Sport
- Sport: Swimming

Sofyan El Gadi (Arabic: سفيان الجدى, born 1 January 1992) is a Libyan swimmer. He competed in the 100 m butterfly event at the 2012 Summer Olympics. He was the flag bearer of Libya at the opening ceremony.

Olympic Games
Preceded by Mohamed Ben Saleh	Flagbearer for Libya; 2012 London	Succeeded by Mohamed Fuad Hrezi
