= Adel Adili =

Libyan long-distance runner (born 1974)

Personal information
- Nationality: Libyan
- Born: 6 September 1974 (age 51)

Sport
- Sport: Long-distance running
- Event: Marathon

Adel Mohamed Adili (Arabic: عادل محمد عادلي; born 6 September 1974) is a Libyan long-distance runner. He finished 7th at the 1997 Mediterranean Games and competed in the men's marathon at the 1996 Summer Olympics and the 2000 Summer Olympics.

== Career ==
In 1992, Adili ran 31:59.6 over 10,000 metres at the Tripoli Outdoor Meeting in Tripoli, Libya. He broke the Libyan national under-20 record.

Adili first qualified for the 1996 Olympic marathon. He completed the course in 2:32:12 hours to place 88th. At a separate race in 1996, Adili set his marathon personal best of 2:25:55 hours.

He ran the marathon again at the 1997 Mediterranean Games. At the Games, he ran 2:34:02 hours to place 7th in the finals.

At the 2003 African Games marathon, Adili placed 14th overall with a 2:44:37 time.

== Personal life ==
Adili used a Surf Shack at the Sydney Olympic village to surf the web. In an interview about Olympians first using the Internet, he said that he liked pizza and the 1997 film Titanic.
