= Ali Mabrouk El Zaidi =

Libyan long-distance runner (born 1978)

Personal information
- Born: January 13, 1978 (age 48)
- Height: 1.73 m (5 ft 8 in)
- Weight: 59 kg (130 lb)

Sport
- Country: Libya
- Sport: Athletics
- Event: Marathon

Ali Mabrouk El Zaidi (born 13 January 1978) is a Libyan long-distance runner. He competed at four editions of the Olympic Games.

He finished eighteenth in the marathon at the 2007 World Championships.

== Achievements ==
Year	Competition	Venue	Position	Event	Notes
2004	Olympic Games	Athens, Greece	39th	Marathon	2:20:31
2007	World Championships	Osaka, Japan	20th	Marathon	2:22:50
2007	Pan Arab Games	Cairo, Egypt	2nd	Half marathon	1:02:32
2009	Mediterranean Games	Pescara, Italy	3rd	Half marathon	1:04:36

== Personal bests ==
- 1500 metres - 3:47.18 min (2000) - national record.
- 3000 metres - 8:07.16 min (1999) - national record.
- 5000 metres - 13:34.99 min (2000) - national record.
- 10,000 metres - 28:48.53 min (1999) - national record.
- Half marathon - 1:02:32 hrs (2007) - national record.
- Marathon - 2:13:33 hrs (2008) - national record.
