= Libyan Paralympic Committee =

National Paralympic Committee of Libya

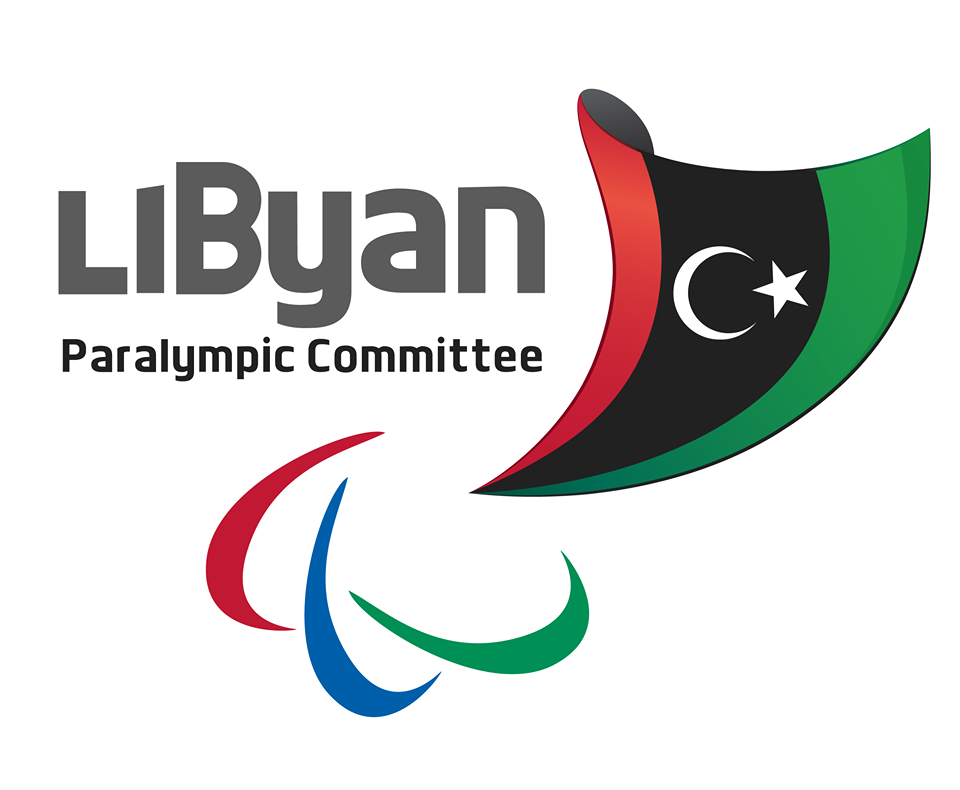

National Paralympic Committee
- Country: Libya
- Code: LBA
- Created: 1981
- Continental association: APC
- Headquarters: Tripoli, Libya
- President: Khaled Raebi
- Website: www.paralympic.ly

Libyan Paralympic Committee (Arabic: اللجنة البارالمبية الليبية) is the National Paralympic Committee operating in Libya which is also the main official governing body of Disabled and Para Sports in Libya responsible for sending, supporting, funding the teams representing Libya and disabled sportspeople at the Paralympics and in other para sporting events. The organisation took the responsibility for sending sportspeople at the Paralympics since 1996. The Libyan Paralympic Committee was established in 1981 as Libyan Federation of Sport Organizations for the Disabled during the tenure of Muammar Gaddafi and the sports body is affiliated with the International Paralympic Committee (IPC), which is the world governing body of disabled sports.

The sports governing body also faced setback on sending participants to represent Libya at the 2016 Summer Paralympics due to financial crisis emerged as a result of breakout of Libyan Civil War. It only managed to send just three competitors for the event.

== See also ==
- Libya at the Paralympics
