= Libyan Olympic Committee =

National Olympic Committee

- Country: Libya
- [[|]]
- Code: LBA
- Created: 1962
- Recognized: 1963
- Continental Association: ANOCA
- Headquarters: Tripoli, Libya
- President: Gamal Ezzarrugh
- Secretary General: Khaled Ezankuli
- Website: www.olympic.ly

The Libyan Olympic Committee (Arabic: اللجنة الاولمبية الليبية) is the National Olympic Committee representing Libya.

== See also ==
- Libya at the Olympics
