= Tunisia at the 2025 World Aquatics Championships =

- Flag of Tunisia
- World Aquatics code: TUN
- National federation: Tunisian Swimming Federation
- Website: ftnatation.tn

in Singapore
- Competitors: 4 in 1 sport
- Medals Ranked 11th: Gold 2 Silver 0 Bronze 0 Total 2

World Aquatics Championships appearances
- 1973; 1975; 1978; 1982; 1986; 1991; 1994; 1998; 2001; 2003; 2005; 2007; 2009; 2011; 2013; 2015; 2017; 2019; 2022; 2023; 2024; 2025

Tunisia competed at the 2025 World Aquatics Championships in Singapore from July 11 to August 3, 2025.

== Medalists ==
Medal	Name	Sport	Event	Date
1st place, gold medalist(s)	Ahmed Jaouadi	Swimming	Men's 800 metre freestyle	30 July 2025
1st place, gold medalist(s)	Ahmed Jaouadi	Swimming	Men's 1500 metre freestyle	3 August 2025

== Competitors ==
The following is the list of competitors in the Championships.

Sport	Men	Women	Total
Swimming	3	1	4
Total	3	1	4

== Swimming ==
Tunisia entered 4 swimmers.

Men

Athlete	Event	Heat		Semi-final		Final	
Athlete	Event	Time	Rank	Time	Rank	Time	Rank
Mohamed Ben Abbes	100 m backstroke	56.92	48	Did not advance			
Mohamed Ben Abbes	200 m backstroke	2:00.30	30	Did not advance			
Mohamed Ben Abbes	400 m individual medley	4:29.14	27	—		Did not advance	
Belhassen Ben Miled	200 m butterfly	2:03.17	31	Did not advance			
Ahmed Jaouadi	800 m freestyle	7:41.58	1 Q	—		7:36.88	1st place, gold medalist(s)
Ahmed Jaouadi	1500 m freestyle	14:44.95	2 Q	—		14:34.41	1st place, gold medalist(s)

Women

Athlete	Event	Heat		Semi-final		Final	
Athlete	Event	Time	Rank	Time	Rank	Time	Rank
Jamila Boulakbech	800 m freestyle	8:54.75	27	—		Did not advance	
