= Swimming at the 2025 World Aquatics Championships – Men's 800 metre freestyle =

Men's 800 metre freestyle at the 2025 World Aquatics Championships
- Venue: World Aquatics Championships Arena
- Location: Singapore Sports Hub, Kallang
- Dates: 29 July (heats); 30 July (final)
- Competitors: 26 from 21 nations
- Winning time: 7:36.88

Medalists
gold medal	Ahmed Jaouadi	Tunisia
silver medal	Sven Schwarz	Germany
bronze medal	Lukas Märtens	Germany

The men's 800 metre freestyle event at the 2025 World Aquatics Championships was held from 29 to 30 July 2025 at the World Aquatics Championships Arena at the Singapore Sports Hub in Kallang, Singapore.

== Background ==
The event was expected to feature a leading group of Sam Short of Australia, Lukas Märtens and Sven Schwarz of Germany, Daniel Wiffen of Ireland, and Bobby Finke of the United States. Short held the Oceanian record of 7:37.76 and had a strong performance at the 2025 Australian Trials. Märtens, the reigning Olympic champion and world record holder in the 400 m freestyle, had recently swum 7:39.10. Schwarz, European record holder at 7:38.12, had shown rapid improvement. Wiffen, the defending Olympic champion, had a best of 7:38.19, while Finke, the 2024 Olympic silver medallist, had recorded 7:38.67. Other contenders included Ahmed Jaouadi of Tunisia, Kuzey Tuncelli of Turkey, and Luca De Tullio of Italy.

== Qualification ==
Each National Federation was permitted to enter a maximum of two qualified athletes in each individual event, but they could do so only if both of them had attained the "A" standard qualification time. For this event, the "A" standard qualification time was 7:48.66. Federations could enter one athlete into the event if they met the "B" standard qualification time. For this event, the "B" standard qualification time was 8:05.06. Athletes could also enter the event if they had met an "A" or "B" standard in a different event and their Federation had not entered anyone else. Additional considerations applied to Federations who had few swimmers enter through the standard qualification times. Federations in this category could at least enter two men and two women to the competition, all of whom could enter into up to two events.

Top 10 fastest qualification times
Swimmer	Country	Time	Competition
Sven Schwarz	Germany	7:38.12	2025 German Championships
Daniel Wiffen	Ireland	7:38.19	2024 Summer Olympics
Bobby Finke	United States	7:38.75	2024 Summer Olympics
Lukas Märtens	Germany	7:39.10	2025 Malmsten Swim Open Stockholm
Gregorio Paltrinieri	Italy	7:39.38	2024 Summer Olympics
Samuel Short	Australia	7:40.95	2025 Australian Swimming Trials
Florian Wellbrock	Germany	7:41.10	2025 Malmsten Swim Open Stockholm
Ahmed Jaouadi	Tunisia	7:42.07	2024 Summer Olympics
Elijah Winnington	Australia	7:42.86	2024 Summer Olympics
David Aubry	France	7:43.59	2024 Summer Olympics

== Records ==
Prior to the competition, the existing world and championship records were as follows.

World record	Zhang Lin (CHN)	7:32.12	Rome, Italy	26 July 2009
Competition record	Zhang Lin (CHN)	7:32.12	Rome, Italy	26 July 2009

== Heats ==
The heats took place on 29 July 2025 at 11:05.

Rank	Heat	Lane	Swimmer	Nation	Time	Notes
1	2	3	Ahmed Jaouadi	Tunisia	7:41.58	Q
2	3	3	Samuel Short	Australia	7:42.22	WD
3	3	4	Sven Schwarz	Germany	7:43.60	Q
4	3	5	Bobby Finke	United States	7:44.02	Q
5	2	8	Victor Johansson	Sweden	7:44.81	Q, NR
6	2	7	Kuzey Tunçelli	Turkey	7:45.13	Q, NR
7	2	5	Lukas Märtens	Germany	7:45.54	Q
8	2	4	Daniel Wiffen	Ireland	7:46.36	Q
9	3	2	Benjamin Goedemans	Australia	7:48.66	Q
10	2	1	David Betlehem	Hungary	7:50.57	
11	3	7	Fei Liwei	China	7:51.01	
12	3	0	Ilia Sibirtsev	Uzbekistan	7:51.98	
13	2	6	Luca de Tullio	Italy	7:53.04	
14	1	4	Ethan Ekk	Canada	7:53.30	
15	3	1	Zhang Zhanshuo	China	7:53.74	
16	3	6	David Aubry	France	7:54.83	
17	3	8	Dimitrios Markos	Greece	7:54.88	
18	2	0	Guilherme Costa	Brazil	7:58.84	
19	3	9	Juan Morales	Colombia	7:59.29	
20	1	3	Milan Vojtko	Slovakia	8:02.57	
21	2	2	Kristóf Rasovszky	Hungary	8:05.09	
22	2	9	Khiew Hoe Yean	Malaysia	8:08.62	
23	1	5	Aryan Nehra	India	8:21.30	
24	1	6	Liggjas Joensen	Faroe Islands	8:21.60	
25	1	2	Kevin Teixeira	Andorra	8:25.32	
26	1	7	Vladimir Hernández Mojarrieta	Cuba	8:41.26	

== Final ==
The final took place on 30 July at 19:02.

Rank	Lane	Name	Nationality	Time	Notes
1st place, gold medalist(s)	4	Ahmed Jaouadi	Tunisia	7:36.88	
2nd place, silver medalist(s)	5	Sven Schwarz	Germany	7:39.96	
3rd place, bronze medalist(s)	7	Lukas Märtens	Germany	7:40.19	
4	3	Bobby Finke	United States	7:46.42	
5	6	Victor Johansson	Sweden	7:47.00	
6	2	Kuzey Tunçelli	Turkey	7:49.09	
7	8	Benjamin Goedemans	Australia	7:50.72	
8	1	Daniel Wiffen	Ireland	7:58.56	
