= 2024 World Aquatics Swimming Championships (25 m) – Men's 800 metre freestyle =

Swimming competition

Men's 800 metre freestyle at the 2024 World Aquatics Swimming Championships (25 m)
- Venue: Duna Arena
- Location: Budapest, Hungary
- Dates: 14 December
- Competitors: 40 from 35 nations
- Winning time: 7:30.56

Medalists
gold medal	Zalán Sárkány	Hungary
silver medal	Florian Wellbrock	Germany
bronze medal	Ahmed Jaouadi	Tunisia

The men's 800 metre freestyle event at the 2024 World Aquatics Swimming Championships (25 m) was held on 14 December 2024 at the Duna Arena in Budapest, Hungary.

== Records ==
Prior to the competition, the existing world and championship records were as follows.

World record	Daniel Wiffen (IRL)	7:20.46	Otopeni, Romania	10 December 2023
Competition record	Gregorio Paltrinieri (ITA)	7:29.99	Melbourne, Australia	17 December 2022

== Background ==
The event featured several top contenders, including Australia’s Elijah Winnington and Germany’s Florian Wellbrock. While Winnington had no recorded short-course 800 m performances, he entered the meet following lifetime bests in long course (7:42.95 at the 2024 World Championships and 7:42.86 at the Paris Olympics). Wellbrock, the short-course world record holder in the 1500 m freestyle, owned a personal best of 7:27.99 from the 2021 European Short Course Championships. Germany’s Sven Schwarz, a 2024 Olympic finalist, entered with a season best of 7:37.02 and a lifetime best of 7:33.85. Tunisia’s Ahmed Jaouadi posted a 7:33.84 in May 2024, ranking first in the world that season. Other contenders included Sweden’s Victor Johansson (7:33.11), Italy’s Luca De Tullio (7:34.08), Hungary’s Zalán Sárkány (7:34.41), and France’s Damien Joly (7:36.59).

SwimSwam predicted Jaouadi would win, Winnington would come second, and Sárkány would come third.

== Results ==
The slowest heats were started at 11:13, and the fastest heat at 18:54.

Rank	Heat	Lane	Name	Nationality	Time	Notes
1st place, gold medalist(s)	5	7	Zalán Sárkány	Hungary	7:30.56	NR
2nd place, silver medalist(s)	3	2	Florian Wellbrock	Germany	7:31.90	
3rd place, bronze medalist(s)	5	5	Ahmed Jaouadi	Tunisia	7:31.93	AF
4	4	5	Sven Schwarz	Germany	7:33.24	
5	5	6	Luca De Tullio	Italy	7:34.32	
6	5	4	Victor Johansson	Sweden	7:34.65	
7	3	5	Elijah Winnington	Australia	7:35.34	
8	5	1	Nathan Wiffen	Ireland	7:35.92	
9	5	3	Savelii Luzin	Neutral Athletes B	7:36.19	
10	3	1	Daniel Matheson	United States	7:37.14	
11	5	8	Dimitrios Markos	Greece	7:37.32	
12	5	2	Kirill Martynychev	Neutral Athletes B	7:39.26	
13	3	8	Krzysztof Chmielewski	Poland	7:39.75	
14	4	4	Damien Joly	France	7:40.77	
15	3	4	Carlos Garach	Spain	7:41.70	
16	4	1	Kuzey Tunçelli	Turkey	7:42.39	
17	4	2	Ondřej Gemov	Czech Republic	7:42.50	
18	4	9	Charlie Clark	United States	7:43.87	
19	4	6	Kazushi Imafuku	Japan	7:44.10	
20	4	7	Rami Rahmouni	Tunisia	7:44.40	
21	3	6	Zhao Heting	China	7:45.40	
22	2	4	Sašo Boškan	Slovenia	7:45.58	
23	3	7	Andrei Proca	Romania	7:46.86	
24	4	0	Muhammed Yusuf Özden	Turkey	7:47.94	
25	3	9	Timothé Barbeau	Canada	7:48.20	
26	4	3	Kim Jun-woo	South Korea	7:49.71	
27	4	8	José Paulo Lopes	Portugal	7:51.23	
28	3	3	Kris Mihaylov	South Africa	7:53.06	
29	2	5	Mark Iltšišin	Estonia	7:55.30	
30	2	7	Marin Mogić	Croatia	7:55.55	NR
31	3	0	Muhd Dhuha Bin Zulfikry	Malaysia	7:56.81	
32	2	0	Liggjas Joensen	Faroe Islands	8:00.75	
33	2	1	Diego Dulieu	Honduras	8:01.94	NR
34	2	6	Larn Hamblyn-Ough	New Zealand	8:06.19	
35	2	9	Nikola Gjuretanovikj	North Macedonia	8:06.79	NR
36	2	3	Wang Yi Shun	Hong Kong	8:08.22	
37	2	8	Chirill Chirsanov	Moldova	8:10.89	
38	1	4	Alberto Vega	Costa Rica	8:11.18	NR
39	1	3	Vladimir Hernández	Cuba	8:34.19	
40	1	5	Christian Chang-Chipolina	Gibraltar	8:59.87	
	1	6	Ali Jaafar	Iraq	Did not start	
	2	2	Antonio Djakovic	Switzerland	Did not start	
