= Swimming at the 2025 World Aquatics Championships – Men's 1500 metre freestyle =

Men's 1500 metre freestyle at the 2025 World Aquatics Championships
- Venue: World Aquatics Championships Arena
- Location: Singapore Sports Hub, Kallang
- Dates: 2 August (heats); 3 August (final)
- Competitors: 21 from 17 nations
- Winning time: 14:34.41

Medalists
gold medal	Ahmed Jaouadi	Tunisia
silver medal	Sven Schwarz	Germany
bronze medal	Bobby Finke	United States

The men's 1500 metre freestyle event at the 2025 World Aquatics Championships was held from 2 to 3 August 2025 at the World Aquatics Championships Arena at the Singapore Sports Hub in Kallang, Singapore.

== Background ==
Bobby Finke of the United States, who set the 14:30.67 world record to win the event at the 2024 Paris Olympics, was aiming to claim his first international gold in this event outside the Olympics. Germany’s Florian Wellbrock entered in strong form, having posted a world-leading 14:36.25 and having won multiple open water titles in 2025, while fellow German Sven Schwarz had recorded a 14:36.82, which made him the ninth-fastest performer in history. Ireland’s Daniel Wiffen, the 2024 world champion, was ranked fourth globally with a 14:42.71 season best. Young contenders, including Turkey’s Kuzey Tunçelli, Hungary’s Dávid Betlehem, and Japan’s Kazushi Imafuku, were also seeking finals places.

== Qualification ==
Each National Federation was permitted to enter a maximum of two qualified athletes in each individual event, but they could do so only if both of them had attained the "A" standard qualification time. For this event, the "A" standard qualification time was 15:01.89. Federations could enter one athlete into the event if they met the "B" standard qualification time. For this event, the "B" standard qualification time was 15:33.46. Athletes could also enter the event if they had met an "A" or "B" standard in a different event and their Federation had not entered anyone else. Additional considerations applied to Federations who had few swimmers enter through the standard qualification times. Federations in this category could at least enter two men and two women to the competition, all of whom could enter into up to two events.

Top 10 fastest qualification times
Swimmer	Country	Time	Competition
Bobby Finke	United States	14:30.67	2024 Summer Olympics
Gregorio Paltrinieri	Italy	14:34.55	2024 Summer Olympics
Florian Wellbrock	Germany	14:36.25	2025 German Championships
Sven Schwarz	Germany	14:36.82	2025 German Championships
Daniel Wiffen	Ireland	14:39.63	2024 Summer Olympics
Dávid Betlehem	Hungary	14:40.91	2024 Summer Olympics
Kuzey Tunçelli	Turkey	14:41.22	2024 Summer Olympics
Ahmed Jaouadi	Tunisia	14:43.35	2024 Summer Olympics
David Aubry	France	14:44.66	2024 Summer Olympics
Damien Joly	France	14:45.52	2024 Summer Olympics

== Records ==
Prior to the competition, the existing world and championship records were as follows.

World record	Bobby Finke (USA)	14:30.67	Paris, France	4 August 2024
Competition record	Ahmed Hafnaoui (TUN)	14:31.54	Fukuoka, Japan	30 July 2023

== Heats ==
The heats took place on 2 August at 11:34.

Rank	Heat	Lane	Name	Nationality	Time	Notes
1	2	4	Florian Wellbrock	Germany	14:44.81	Q
2	3	6	Ahmed Jaouadi	Tunisia	14:44.95	Q
3	2	3	Kuzey Tunçelli	Turkey	14:45.28	Q
4	3	5	Sven Schwarz	Germany	14:45.31	Q
5	3	4	Bobby Finke	United States	14:45.70	Q
6	3	1	Samuel Short	Australia	14:46.24	Q
7	2	7	Zalán Sárkány	Hungary	14:47.89	Q
8	3	2	Damien Joly	France	14:51.06	Q
9	2	1	David Johnston	United States	14:56.20	
10	3	3	Dávid Betlehem	Hungary	14:59.09	
11	2	6	David Aubry	France	15:03.32	
12	2	2	Fei Liwei	China	15:05.24	
13	2	8	Victor Johansson	Sweden	15:06.17	
14	3	9	Nguyễn Huy Hoàng	Vietnam	15:19.39	
15	3	7	Kazushi Imafuku	Japan	15:24.98	
16	2	0	Ilia Sibirtsev	Uzbekistan	15:30.66	
17	3	0	Marin Mogić	Croatia	15:36.12	
18	2	9	Suleyman Ismayilzada	Azerbaijan	15:45.63	
19	1	4	Kushagra Rawat	India	15:47.43	
20	1	5	Líggjas Joensen	Faroe Islands	16:22.49	
21	1	3	Ahmed Theibich	Bahrain	17:21.71	
	2	5	Daniel Wiffen	Ireland	Did not start	
	3	8	Benjamin Goedemans	Australia	Did not start	

== Final ==
The final took place on 3 August at 19:31.

Rank	Lane	Name	Nationality	Time	Notes
1st place, gold medalist(s)	5	Ahmed Jaouadi	Tunisia	14:34.41	
2nd place, silver medalist(s)	6	Sven Schwarz	Germany	14:35.69	
3rd place, bronze medalist(s)	2	Bobby Finke	United States	14:36.60	
4	7	Samuel Short	Australia	14:43.08	
5	4	Florian Wellbrock	Germany	14:44.29	
6	3	Kuzey Tunçelli	Turkey	14:52.44	
7	1	Zalán Sárkány	Hungary	14:55.17	
8	8	Damien Joly	France	15:19.06	
