= Swimming at the 2024 Summer Olympics – Men's 1500-metre freestyle =

Men's 1500 metre freestyle at the Games of the XXXIII Olympiad
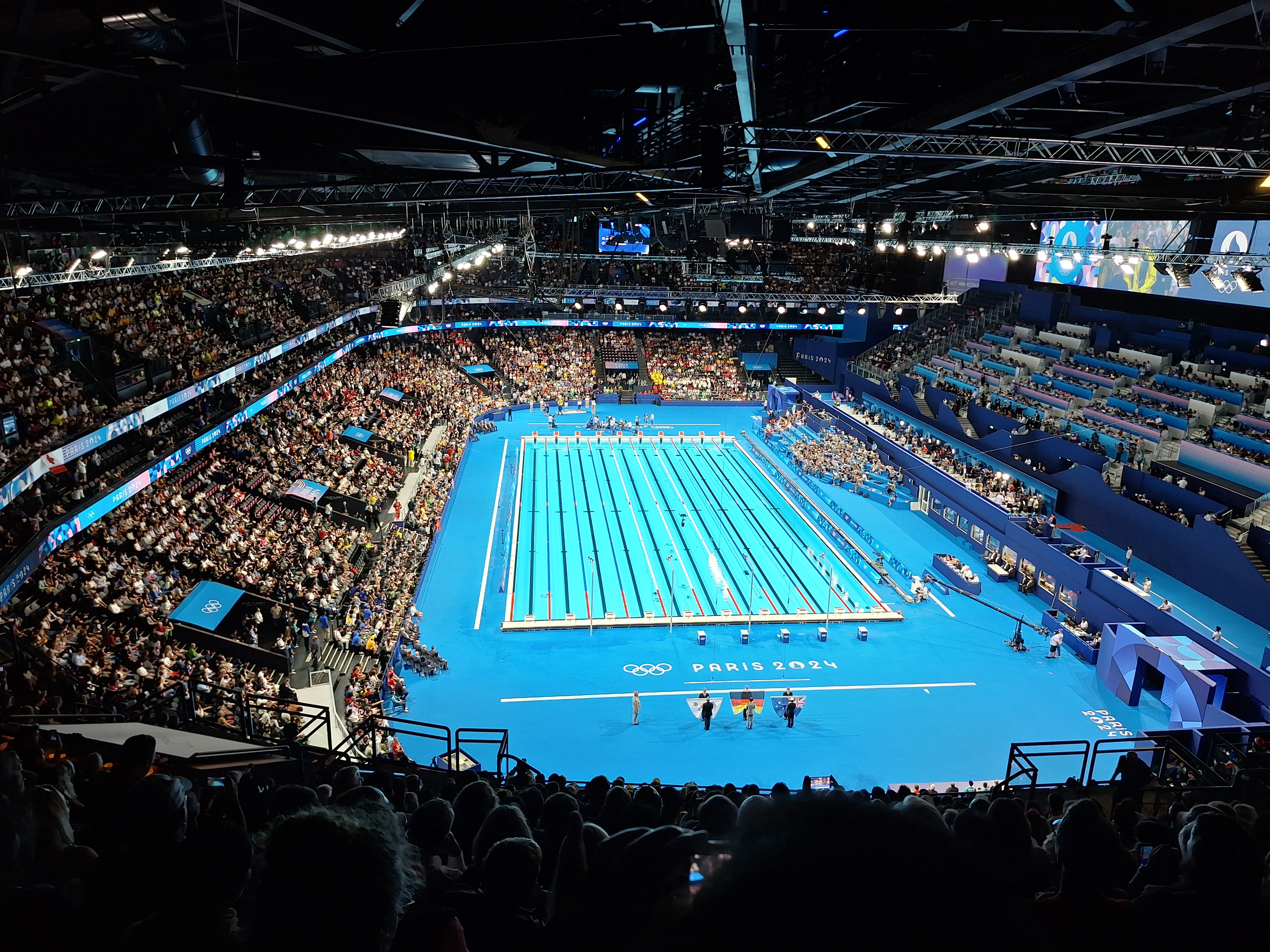
- Paris La Défense Arena after it was converted to a swimming pool for the swimming events
- Venue: Paris La Défense Arena
- Dates: 3 August 2024 (Heats); 4 August 2024 (Final)
- Competitors: 24 from 18 nations
- Winning time: 14:30.67 WR

Medalists
1st place, gold medalist(s)		Bobby Finke	United States
2nd place, silver medalist(s)		Gregorio Paltrinieri	Italy
3rd place, bronze medalist(s)		Daniel Wiffen	Ireland

The men's 1500 metre freestyle event at the 2024 Summer Olympics was held from 3 to 4 August 2024 at Paris La Défense Arena, which was converted to a swimming pool for the swimming events.

The US' Bobby Finke was considered the most likely to win the event, with other medal contenders including Ireland's Daniel Wiffen, Italy's Gregorio Paltrinieri, Australia's Samuel Short, Ukraine's Mykhailo Romanchuk and Germany's Florian Wellbrock. Romanchuk withdrew from the event due to illness.

In the final, Finke led from beginning to end to win with a new world record of 14:30.67 for the only US men's swimming gold at these games. Paltrinieri swam a time of 14:34.55 for silver, and Wiffen won bronze with a time of 14:39.63. Also in the final, Dávid Betlehem lowered Hungary's national record from the 14:45.59 he achieved in the heats to 14:40.91, Turkey's Kuzey Tunçelli swam 14:41.22 to break the world junior record and his country's national record, and David Aubry lowered France's national record to 14:44.66.

== Background ==
The US' Bobby Finke won the event at the previous Olympics, won silver at the 2023 World Championships and had the fastest qualification time of 14:31.59. Tunisian Ahmed Hafnaoui, the 2023 Championships winner, withdrew from the Olympics due to an undisclosed injury.

Ireland's Daniel Wiffen won the event at the 2024 World Championships in Finke's absence with the second fastest qualifying time of 14:34.07. (Note: Several top swimmers chose not to attend the 2024 Championships to instead focus on their Olympic preparation.) Italy's Gregorio Paltrinieri won the event at the 2022 World Championships, but withdrew from it at the 2023 Championships due to what SwimSwam called "physical problems". Other medal contenders included Australia's 2023 World Championships bronze medallist Samuel Short, defending Olympic silver medallist Mykhailo Romanchuk from Ukraine, and defending Olympic bronze medallist Florian Wellbrock from Germany.

Both SwimSwam and Swimming World predicted Finke would win gold and Wiffen would win silver. Swimming World predicted Short would win bronze, while SwimSwam predicted Paltrinieri would take it.

Prior to the event, the world and Olympic records were 14:31.02, set by Sun Yang of China in 2012.

The event was held at Paris La Défense Arena, which was converted to a swimming pool for the swimming events.

== Qualification ==
Each National Olympic Committee (NOC) was permitted to enter a maximum of two qualified athletes in each individual event, but only if both of them had attained the Olympic Qualifying Time (OQT). For this event, the OQT was 15:00.99. World Aquatics then considered athletes qualifying through universality; NOCs were given one event entry for each gender, which could be used by any athlete regardless of qualification time, providing the spaces had not already been taken by athletes from that nation who had achieved the OQT. Finally, the rest of the spaces were filled by athletes who had met the Olympic Consideration Time (OCT), which was 15:05.49 for this event. In total, 24 athletes qualified through achieving the OQT, two athletes qualified through universality places and two athletes qualified through achieving the OCT.

Top 10 fastest qualification times
Swimmer	Country	Time	Competition
Bobby Finke	United States	14:31.59	2023 World Aquatics Championships
Daniel Wiffen	Ireland	14:34.07	2024 World Aquatics Championships
Florian Wellbrock	Germany	14:34.89	2023 Berlin Open
Samuel Short	Australia	14:37.28	2023 World Aquatics Championships
Mykhailo Romanchuk	Ukraine	14:40.21	2023 Stockholm Open
Gregorio Paltrinieri	Italy	14:41.38	2023 Italian Championships
Sven Schwarz	Germany	14:43.53	2023 European U-23 Championships
David Aubry	France	14:44.85	2024 World Aquatics Championships
Dávid Betlehem	Hungary	14:46.44	2024 World Aquatics Championships
Daniel Jervis	Great Britain	14:46.95	2023 British Swimming Championships

== Heats ==
Four heats (preliminary rounds) took place on 3 August 2024, starting at 11:30. (Note: All times are Central European Summer Time (UTC+2)) The swimmers with the best eight times in the heats advanced to the final. Wiffen qualified with the fastest time of 14:40.34, which was two seconds faster than anyone else, while Paltrinieri qualified with the second fastest time of 14:42.56. Hungary's Dávid Betlehem broke his country's national record with a time of 14:45.59. Tunisia's Ahmed Jaouadi, France's David Aubry, Turkey's Kuzey Tunçelli, France's Damien Joly, Dávid Betlehem of Hungary, and Finke also qualified. Romanchuk withdrew from the race due to illness.

Results
Rank	Heat	Lane	Swimmer	Nation	Time	Notes
1	3	4	Daniel Wiffen	Ireland	14:40.34	Q
2	3	3	Gregorio Paltrinieri	Italy	14:42.56	Q
3	4	7	Ahmed Jaouadi	Tunisia	14:44.20	Q
4	3	6	David Aubry	France	14:44.90	Q
5	2	4	Kuzey Tunçelli	Turkey	14:45.27	Q
6	4	4	Bobby Finke	United States	14:45.31	Q
7	3	1	Damien Joly	France	14:45.52	Q
8	4	2	Dávid Betlehem	Hungary	14:45.59	Q, NR
9	4	1	Fei Liwei	China	14:50.06	
10	4	6	Sven Schwarz	Germany	14:51.97	
11	3	8	Zalán Sárkány	Hungary	14:52.42	
12	3	7	Luca De Tullio	Italy	14:55.61	
13	3	5	Samuel Short	Australia	14:58.15	
14	4	5	Florian Wellbrock	Germany	15:01.88	
15	3	2	Daniel Jervis	Great Britain	15:03.75	
16	2	8	Krzysztof Chmielewski	Poland	15:04.99	
17	2	2	Victor Johansson	Sweden	15:05.62	
18	4	8	David Johnston	United States	15:10.64	
19	1	5	Dimitrios Markos	Greece	15:11.19	
20	2	6	Henrik Christiansen	Norway	15:14.11	
21	1	4	Nguyễn Huy Hoàng	Vietnam	15:18.63	
22	2	3	Carlos Garach	Spain	15:20.84	
23	2	1	Emir Batur Albayrak	Turkey	15:23.21	
24	1	3	Rodolfo Falcón Jr	Cuba	16:00.31	
	4	3	Mykhailo Romanchuk	Ukraine	DNS	
	2	5	Marwan Elkamash	Egypt	DNS	
	2	7	Vlad Stancu	Romania	DNS	

== Final ==
The final took place at 18:37 on 4 August. Finke led the race from beginning to end to win with a new world record of 14:30.67, which beat Sun Yang's previous world record of 14:31.02 from the 2012 Olympics. Paltrinieri finished almost four seconds later with 14:34.55 to win silver, and Wiffen finished with 14:39.63 and won bronze.

Betlehem finished fourth with a time of 14:40.91, which beat and lowered his national record set in the heats by 4.68 seconds. Tunçelli finished fifth with a new world junior record and national record of 14:41.22, which lowered those records, which he already held, by 0.67. David Aubry also lowered France's national record, swimming 14:44.66 to finish seventh.

SwimSwam noted that Finke had changed his strategy away from swimming faster nearing the end of the race to swimming a more consistent pace the whole way through, and they later called his race the "swim of the meet". Finke's win also moved the US to the top of the swimming medal table, where they stayed for the remaining day of the swimming events. His win won him the US' only male individual swimming gold of the 2024 Games.

Results
Rank	Lane	Swimmer	Nation	Time	Notes
1st place, gold medalist(s)	7	Bobby Finke	United States	14:30.67	WR
2nd place, silver medalist(s)	5	Gregorio Paltrinieri	Italy	14:34.55	
3rd place, bronze medalist(s)	4	Daniel Wiffen	Ireland	14:39.63	
4	8	Dávid Betlehem	Hungary	14:40.91	NR
5	2	Kuzey Tunçelli	Turkey	14:41.22	WJ, NR
6	3	Ahmed Jaouadi	Tunisia	14:43.35	
7	6	David Aubry	France	14:44.66	NR
8	1	Damien Joly	France	14:52.61	

Statistics
Name	500 metre split	1000 metre split	1300 metre split	Time	Stroke rate (strokes/min)
Bobby Finke	04:49.10	09:41.72	12:36.69	14:30.67	39.0
Gregorio Paltrinieri	04:50.37	09:43.02	12:38.05	14:34.55	43.3
Daniel Wiffen	04:52.24	09:45.16	12:41.93	14:39.63	36.6
Dávid Betlehem	04:52.76	09:48.54	12:46.27	14:40.91	47.5
Kuzey Tunçelli	04:53.36	09:49.29	12:46.13	14:41.22	44.0
Ahmed Jaouadi	04:53.23	09:49.34	12:48.29	14:43.35	36.9
David Aubry	04:59.29	09:50.30	12:48.15	14:44.66	35.1
Damien Joly	04:57.52	09:55.31	12:54.09	14:52.61	38.8
