= Tunisia at the 2024 World Aquatics Championships =

- Flag of Tunisia
- World Aquatics code: TUN
- National federation: Tunisian Swimming Federation
- Website: ftnatation.tn

in Doha, Qatar
- Competitors: 3 in 2 sports
- Medals: Gold 0 Silver 0 Bronze 0 Total 0

World Aquatics Championships appearances
- 1973; 1975; 1978; 1982; 1986; 1991; 1994; 1998; 2001; 2003; 2005; 2007; 2009; 2011; 2013; 2015; 2017; 2019; 2022; 2023; 2024; 2025

Tunisia competed at the 2024 World Aquatics Championships in Doha, Qatar from 2 to 18 February.

== Competitors ==
The following is the list of competitors in the Championships.

Sport	Men	Women	Total
Artistic swimming	0	1	1
Swimming	2	0	2
Total	2	1	3

== Artistic swimming ==
Women

Athlete	Event	Preliminaries		Final	
Athlete	Event	Points	Rank	Points	Rank
Toulan Ben Abdel Fattah	Solo free routine	101.1083	29	Did not advance	

== Swimming ==
Tunisia entered 2 swimmers.

Men

Athlete	Event	Heat		Semifinal		Final	
Athlete	Event	Time	Rank	Time	Rank	Time	Rank
Ahmed Hafnaoui	400 metre freestyle	3:48.05	17	—		Did not advance	
Ahmed Hafnaoui	800 metre freestyle	7:51.72	18	—		Did not advance	
Ahmed Hafnaoui	1500 metre freestyle	15:09.02	17	—		Did not advance	
Ahmed Jaouadi	400 metre freestyle	3:49.85	25	—		Did not advance	
