= Swimming at the 2024 Summer Olympics =

Swimming at the Games of the XXXIII Olympiad
- Pictograms for swimming (top) and marathon swimming (bottom)
- Venue: Paris La Défense Arena (pool); Pont Alexandre III (marathon)
- Dates: 27 July – 4 August 2024 (pool); 8–9 August 2024 (marathon)
- No. of events: 35 (pool); 2 (marathon)

The swimming competitions at the 2024 Summer Olympics in Paris were held from 27 July to 9 August 2024. There were 35 swimming events in the pool and two marathon swimming events in the open water. The pool events took place from 27 July to 4 August at the Paris La Défense Arena, and the marathon swimming events took place from 8 to 9 August between Pont Alexandre III and Pont de l'Alma in the Seine river.

France's Léon Marchand won all four individual events he entered at the Games. Four world records were broken, by: Pan Zhanle in the men's 100 m freestyle, Bobby Finke in the men's 1500 metre freestyle, and team United States in the women's 4 × 100 metre medley and mixed 4 × 100 metre medley relays. Some slower than expected performances contributed to media speculation that the Paris 2024 pool was slow.

== Events ==
=== Pool swimming ===
Pool swimming featured a total of 35 events (17 each for men and women and one mixed event). All pool events were contested in a long course (50-metre long) pool at Paris La Défense Arena, which was converted to a swimming pool arena for the events.

The following events were contested for both men and women (distances are in meters):

- Freestyle: 50, 100, 200, 400, 800, and 1500;
- Backstroke: 100 and 200;
- Breaststroke: 100 and 200;
- Butterfly: 100 and 200;
- Individual medley: 200 and 400;
- Relays: 4 × 100 free, 4 × 200 free; 4 × 100 medley;

In addition, there was one event which included athletes of both genders: the mixed 4 × 100 metres medley relay.

=== Marathon swimming ===
Marathon swimming consisted of two events: the men's and women's 10 kilometer races. Both were contested between Pont Alexandre III and Pont de l'Alma in the Seine river.

== Achievements ==
France’s Léon Marchand won all four individual events he entered at the 2024 Games: the 200 breaststroke, the 200 butterfly, and the 200 and 400 individual medleys. Eric Goodman from NBC called Marchand's 200 breaststroke and 200 butterfly double win "unprecedented", as both events were on the same night. It was the first time a swimmer had won both these events at the Olympics, and the first time since 1976 that a swimmer had won two individual events on the same night.

Pan Zhanle of China won the men's 100 m freestyle in a world record time of 46.40 seconds, finishing over a second ahead of silver medalist Kyle Chalmers of Australia – the longest time between first and second place in that event since 1928. In the mixed 4 × 100 metre medley relay, the United States set a new world record of 3:37.43. The US's Bobby Finke set a new world record of 14:30.67 in the men's 1500 metre freestyle, and in the women's 4 × 100 metre medley relay, the United States set the world record with a time of 3:49.63. China became the first country to beat the USA to Olympic gold in the men's 4 × 100 metre medley relay since the event was introduced in 1960.

== Media perception of "slow" pool ==
During the first five days of the swimming events, one world record was broken. This compared with six that had been broken five days into the Tokyo 2020 Olympics swimming events and eight that had been broken in the first five days of the 2016 Rio Olympics. This, along with other slower than expected performances, contributed to media speculation that the Paris 2024 pool was "slow". Speculation centred around the possible explanation that the shallowness of the pool was to blame, since the pool was 2.15 metres deep—shallower than the pools at both Tokyo and Rio, which were both 3 metres deep. Outlets reported that this shallowness may have caused greater waves in the pool, which could have slowed down swimmers. Other possible explanations given for the apparent slowness of the swimmers were the pool being a temporary structure, the pool being slightly longer than 50 metres, (Note: World Aquatics allows a 10 millimetre margin of error, and the exact length of the pool was not known.) the pool ventilation system not being working effectively on the surface of the water, and athlete psychological challenges at the Games.

== Schedules ==
=== Pool swimming ===
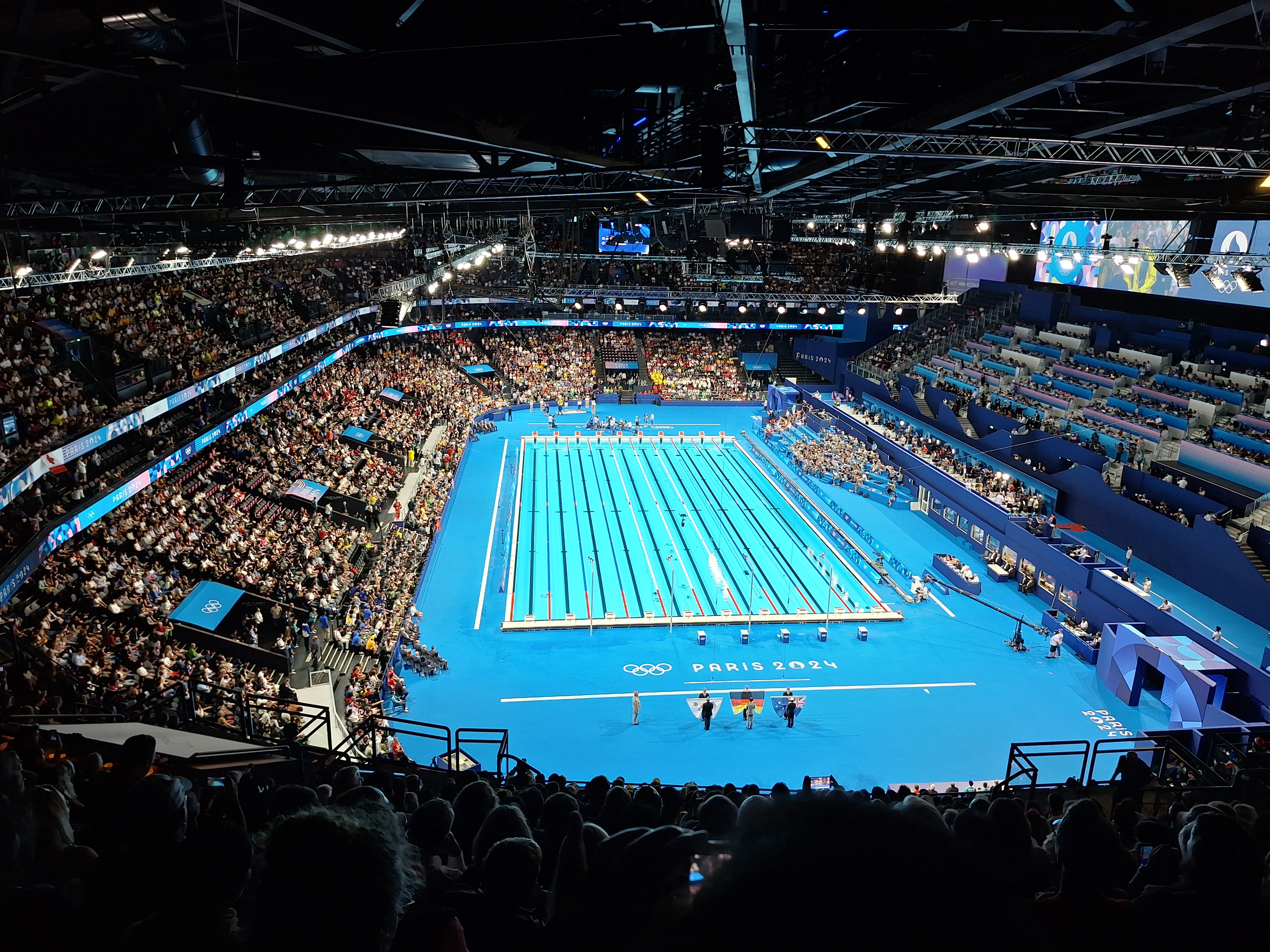
Paris La Défense Arena after it was converted to a swimming pool for the swimming events

For the pool events preliminary rounds ran in the morning, followed by the semifinal and final sessions in the evening. The program extended to nine days for the first time at the Olympics, compared to the eight day schedule at the previous Olympics. Sophie Kaufman from SwimSwam speculated the extra day would likely be used to space out events more to give swimmers more rest.

In February 2024, a change was announced to the original schedule for Days 5 and 6, after lobbying by the French swimming governing body to give Léon Marchand a chance to win both the men's 200 metre butterfly and 200 metre breaststroke events. All events remained on the originally planned days, but the event order was modified to create a longer gap between the 200 metre butterfly and 200 metre breaststroke events.

Legend
H	Heats	½	Semi-finals	F	Final

M = Morning session, starting at 11:00 local time (09:00 UTC).
E = Evening session, starting at 20:30 local time (18:30 UTC).

Men's events schedule
Date →	27 Jul		28 Jul		29 Jul		30 Jul		31 Jul		1 Aug		2 Aug		3 Aug		4 Aug		8 Aug		9 Aug	
Event ↓	M	E	M	E	M	E	M	E	M	E	M	E	M	E	M	E	M	E	M	E	M	E
50 m freestyle											H	½		F								
100 m freestyle							H	½		F												
200 m freestyle			H	½		F																
400 m freestyle	H	F																				
800 m freestyle					H			F														
1500 m freestyle															H			F				
100 m backstroke			H	½		F																
200 m backstroke									H	½		F										
100 m breaststroke	H	½		F																		
200 m breaststroke							H	½		F												
100 m butterfly													H	½		F						
200 m butterfly							H	½		F												
200 m individual medley											H	½		F								
400 m individual medley			H	F																		
4 × 100 m freestyle relay	H	F																				
4 × 200 m freestyle relay							H	F														
4 × 100 m medley relay															H			F				

Women's events schedule
Date →	27 Jul		28 Jul		29 Jul		30 Jul		31 Jul		1 Aug		2 Aug		3 Aug		4 Aug		8 Aug		9 Aug	
Event ↓	M	E	M	E	M	E	M	E	M	E	M	E	M	E	M	E	M	E	M	E	M	E
50 m freestyle															H	½		F				
100 m freestyle							H	½		F												
200 m freestyle			H	½		F																
400 m freestyle	H	F																				
800 m freestyle													H			F						
1500 m freestyle							H			F												
100 m backstroke					H	½		F														
200 m backstroke											H	½		F								
100 m breaststroke			H	½		F																
200 m breaststroke									H	½		F										
100 m butterfly	H	½		F																		
200 m butterfly									H	½		F										
200 m individual medley													H	½		F						
400 m individual medley					H	F																
4 × 100 m freestyle relay	H	F																				
4 × 200 m freestyle relay											H	F										
4 × 100 m medley relay															H			F				

Mixed event schedule
Date →	27 Jul		28 Jul		29 Jul		30 Jul		31 Jul		1 Aug		2 Aug		3 Aug		4 Aug		8 Aug		9 Aug	
Event ↓	M	E	M	E	M	E	M	E	M	E	M	E	M	E	M	E	M	E	M	E	M	E
4 × 100 m medley relay													H			F						

=== Marathon swimming ===
The women's marathon 10 km took place on 8 August at 07:30, and the men's marathon 10 km took place on 9 August at 07:30.

== Qualification ==
=== Pool swimming ===
==== Individual events ====
Each National Olympic Committee (NOC) was permitted to enter a maximum of two qualified athletes in each individual event, but only if both of them had attained the Olympic Qualifying Time (OQT). World Aquatics then considered athletes who had only qualified in a relay event, and then athletes qualifying through universality; NOCs were given one event entry for each gender, which could be used by any athlete regardless of qualification time, providing the spaces had not already been taken by athletes from that nation who had achieved the OQT. (Note: NOCs were subject to some other restrictions on who they could pick to fill their universality places.) Finally, the rest of the spaces were filled by athletes who had met the Olympic Consideration Time (OCT).

==== Relay events ====
Each NOC could enter one team per event, and there were a total of sixteen qualification places available in each event. The first three qualifying places were given to the podium finishers at the 2023 World Championships, and the final thirteen qualifying places were allocated to the fastest performances at the 2023 and 2024 World Championships.

=== Marathon swimming ===
Each NOC was permitted to enter a maximum of two qualified athletes per event. World Aquatics provided a qualification pathway to fulfil their quota of at least 22 competing athletes. Athletes were selected in the following order:

- The three medalists in the 10 km races at the 2023 World Aquatics Championships
- The top thirteen swimmers in the 10 km races at the 2024 World Aquatics Championships
- One representative from each World Aquatics continent (Africa, the Americas, Asia, Europe, and Oceania) (Note: If a continental place was not used, the slot was reallocated to the fastest unqualified swimmer at the 2024 World Aquatics Championships.)
- One representative from the host nation (France) if not qualified by other means (Note: If a French swimmer already qualified, their slot was reallocated to the fastest unqualified swimmer at the 2024 World Aquatics Championships.)

In addition to the athletes invited to fulfil the quota, any athletes who achieved the Olympic Qualification Time in either the 800 or 1500 metres freestyle were invited to compete.

== Medal summary ==
=== Medal table ===
* Host nation (France)

Rank	Nation	Gold	Silver	Bronze	Total
1	United States	8	13	7	28
2	Australia	7	9	3	19
3	France*	4	1	2	7
4	Canada	3	2	3	8
5	Hungary	3	1	1	5
6	China	2	3	7	12
7	Italy	2	1	3	6
8	Sweden	2	0	0	2
9	Great Britain	1	4	0	5
10	Germany	1	1	1	3
11	South Africa	1	1	0	2
12	Ireland	1	0	2	3
12	Netherlands	1	0	2	3
14	Romania	1	0	1	2
15	Greece	0	1	0	1
15	Japan	0	1	0	1
17	Hong Kong	0	0	2	2
18	South Korea	0	0	1	1
18	Switzerland	0	0	1	1
Totals (19 entries)		37	38	36	111

=== Medalists ===
==== Pool swimming ====
Men
Event	Gold		Silver		Bronze	
50 m freestyle	Cameron McEvoy; Australia	21.25	Ben Proud; Great Britain	21.30	Florent Manaudou; France	21.56
100 m freestyle	Pan Zhanle; China	46.40 WR	Kyle Chalmers; Australia	47.48	David Popovici; Romania	47.49
200 m freestyle	David Popovici; Romania	1:44.72	Matthew Richards; Great Britain	1:44.74	Luke Hobson; United States	1:44.79
400 m freestyle	Lukas Märtens; Germany	3:41.78	Elijah Winnington; Australia	3:42.21	Kim Woo-min; South Korea	3:42.50
800 m freestyle	Daniel Wiffen; Ireland	7:38.19 OR, ER	Bobby Finke; United States	7:38.75	Gregorio Paltrinieri; Italy	7:39.38
1500 m freestyle	Bobby Finke; United States	14:30.67 WR	Gregorio Paltrinieri; Italy	14:34.55	Daniel Wiffen; Ireland	14:39.63
100 m backstroke	Thomas Ceccon; Italy	52.00	Xu Jiayu; China	52.32	Ryan Murphy; United States	52.39
200 m backstroke	Hubert Kós; Hungary	1:54.26	Apostolos Christou; Greece	1:54.82 NR	Roman Mityukov; Switzerland	1:54.85 NR
100 m breaststroke	Nicolò Martinenghi; Italy	59.03	Adam Peaty; Great Britain Nic Fink; United States	59.05	Not awarded as there was a tie for silver.	
200 m breaststroke	Léon Marchand; France	2:05.85 OR, ER	Zac Stubblety-Cook; Australia	2:06.79	Caspar Corbeau; Netherlands	2:07.90
100 m butterfly	Kristóf Milák; Hungary	49.90	Josh Liendo; Canada	49.99 NR	Ilya Kharun; Canada	50.45
200 m butterfly	Léon Marchand; France	1:51.21 OR, NR	Kristóf Milák; Hungary	1:51.75	Ilya Kharun; Canada	1:52.80 NR
200 m individual medley	Léon Marchand; France	1:54.06 OR, ER	Duncan Scott; Great Britain	1:55.31	Wang Shun; China	1:56.00
400 m individual medley	Léon Marchand; France	4:02.95 OR	Tomoyuki Matsushita; Japan	4:08.62	Carson Foster; United States	4:08.66
4 × 100 m freestyle relay	United States; Jack Alexy (47.67); Chris Guiliano (47.33); Hunter Armstrong (46.75); Caeleb Dressel (47.53); Ryan Held^{[a]} Matt King^{[a]}	3:09.28	Australia; Jack Cartwright (48.03); Flynn Southam (48.00); Kai Taylor (47.73); Kyle Chalmers (46.59); William Yang^{[a]}	3:10.35	Italy; Alessandro Miressi (48.04); Thomas Ceccon (47.44); Paolo Conte Bonin (48.16); Manuel Frigo (47.06); Lorenzo Zazzeri^{[a]} Leonardo Deplano^{[a]}	3:10.70
4 × 200 m freestyle relay	Great Britain; James Guy (1:45.09); Tom Dean (1:45.28); Matt Richards (1:45.11); Duncan Scott (1:43.95); Jack McMillan^{[a]} Kieran Bird^{[a]}	6:59.43	United States; Luke Hobson (1:45.55); Carson Foster (1:45.31); Drew Kibler (1:45.12); Kieran Smith (1:44.80); Brooks Curry^{[a]} Blake Pieroni^{[a]} Chris Guiliano^{[a]}	7:00.78	Australia; Maximillian Giuliani (1:45.99); Flynn Southam (1:45.53); Elijah Winnington (1:45.19); Thomas Neill (1:45.27); Kai Taylor^{[a]} Zac Incerti^{[a]}	7:01.98
4 × 100 m medley relay	China; Xu Jiayu (52.37); Qin Haiyang (57.98); Sun Jiajun (51.19); Pan Zhanle (45.92); Wang Changhao^{[a]}	3:27.46	United States; Ryan Murphy (52.44); Nic Fink (58.97); Caeleb Dressel (49.41); Hunter Armstrong (47.19); Charlie Swanson^{[a]} Thomas Heilman^{[a]} Jack Alexy^{[a]}	3:28.01	France; Yohann Ndoye-Brouard (52.60); Léon Marchand (58.62); Maxime Grousset (49.57); Florent Manaudou (47.59); Clément Secchi^{[a]} Rafael Fente-Damers^{[a]}	3:28.38 NR

^{a} Swimmers who participated in the heats only and received medals.

Women
Event	Gold		Silver		Bronze	
50 m freestyle	Sarah Sjöström; Sweden	23.71	Meg Harris; Australia	23.97	Zhang Yufei; China	24.20
100 m freestyle	Sarah Sjöström; Sweden	52.16	Torri Huske; United States	52.29	Siobhán Haughey; Hong Kong	52.33
200 m freestyle	Mollie O'Callaghan; Australia	1:53.27 OR	Ariarne Titmus; Australia	1:53.81	Siobhán Haughey; Hong Kong	1:54.55
400 m freestyle	Ariarne Titmus; Australia	3:57.49	Summer McIntosh; Canada	3:58.37	Katie Ledecky; United States	4:00.86
800 m freestyle	Katie Ledecky; United States	8:11.04	Ariarne Titmus; Australia	8:12.29 OC	Paige Madden; United States	8:13.00
1500 m freestyle	Katie Ledecky; United States	15:30.02 OR	Anastasiya Kirpichnikova; France	15:40.35 NR	Isabel Marie Gose; Germany	15:41.16 NR
100 m backstroke	Kaylee McKeown; Australia	57.33 OR, =OC	Regan Smith; United States	57.66	Katharine Berkoff; United States	57.98
200 m backstroke	Kaylee McKeown; Australia	2:03.73 OR	Regan Smith; United States	2:04.26	Kylie Masse; Canada	2:05.57
100 m breaststroke	Tatjana Smith; South Africa	1:05.28	Tang Qianting; China	1:05.54	Mona McSharry; Ireland	1:05.59
200 m breaststroke	Kate Douglass; United States	2:19.24 AM	Tatjana Smith; South Africa	2:19.60	Tes Schouten; Netherlands	2:21.05
100 m butterfly	Torri Huske; United States	55.59	Gretchen Walsh; United States	55.63	Zhang Yufei; China	56.21
200 m butterfly	Summer McIntosh; Canada	2:03.03 OR, WJ, AM	Regan Smith; United States	2:03.84 NR	Zhang Yufei; China	2:05.09
200 m individual medley	Summer McIntosh; Canada	2:06.56 OR, WJ, NR	Kate Douglass; United States	2:06.92	Kaylee McKeown; Australia	2:08.08
400 m individual medley	Summer McIntosh; Canada	4:27.71	Katie Grimes; United States	4:33.40	Emma Weyant; United States	4:34.93
4 × 100 m freestyle relay	Australia; Mollie O'Callaghan (52.24); Shayna Jack (52.35); Emma McKeon (52.39); Meg Harris (51.94); Olivia Wunsch^{[a]} Bronte Campbell^{[a]}	3:28.92 OR	United States; Kate Douglass (52.98); Gretchen Walsh (52.55); Torri Huske (52.06); Simone Manuel (52.61); Abbey Weitzeil^{[a]} Erika Connolly^{[a]}	3:30.20 AM	China; Yang Junxuan (52.48); Cheng Yujie (52.76); Zhang Yufei (52.75); Wu Qingfeng (52.31); Yu Yiting^{[a]}	3:30.30 AS
4 × 200 m freestyle relay	Australia; Mollie O'Callaghan (1:53.52); Lani Pallister (1:55.61); Brianna Throssell (1:56.00); Ariarne Titmus (1:52.95); Jamie Perkins^{[a]} Shayna Jack^{[a]}	7:38.08 OR	United States; Claire Weinstein (1:54.88); Paige Madden (1:55.63); Katie Ledecky (1:54.93); Erin Gemmell (1:55.40); Anna Peplowski^{[a]} Simone Manuel^{[a]} Alex Shackell^{[a]}	7:40.86	China; Yang Junxuan (1:54.52); Li Bingjie (1:55.05); Ge Chutong (1:57.45); Liu Yaxin (1:55.32); Tang Muhan^{[a]} Kong Yaqi^{[a]}	7:42.34
4 × 100 m medley relay	United States; Regan Smith (57.28) OR; Lilly King (1:04.90); Gretchen Walsh (55.03); Torri Huske (52.42); Katharine Berkoff^{[a]} Emma Weber^{[a]} Alex Shackell^{[a]} Kate Douglass^{[a]}	3:49.63 WR	Australia; Kaylee McKeown (57.72); Jenna Strauch (1:07.31); Emma McKeon (56.25); Mollie O'Callaghan (51.83); Iona Anderson^{[a]} Ella Ramsay^{[a]} Alexandria Perkins^{[a]} Meg Harris^{[a]}	3:53.11	China; Wan Letian (59.81); Tang Qianting (1:05.79); Zhang Yufei (55.52); Yang Junxuan (52.11); Wang Xue'er^{[a]} Yu Yiting^{[a]} Wu Qingfeng^{[a]}	3:53.23

^{a} Swimmers who participated in the heats only and received medals.

Mixed
Event	Gold		Silver		Bronze	
4 × 100 m medley relay	United States; Ryan Murphy (52.08); Nic Fink (58.29); Gretchen Walsh (55.18); Torri Huske (51.88); Regan Smith^{[a]} Charlie Swanson^{[a]} Caeleb Dressel^{[a]} Abbey Weitzeil^{[a]}	3:37.43 WR	China; Xu Jiayu (52.13); Qin Haiyang (57.82); Zhang Yufei (55.64); Yang Junxuan (51.96); Tang Qianting^{[a]} Pan Zhanle^{[a]}	3:37.55 AS	Australia; Kaylee McKeown (57.90); Joshua Yong (58.43); Matthew Temple (50.42); Mollie O'Callaghan (52.01); Iona Anderson^{[a]} Zac Stubblety-Cook^{[a]} Emma McKeon^{[a]} Kyle Chalmers^{[a]}	3:38.76 OC

^{a} Swimmers who participated in the heats only and received medals.

==== Marathon swimming ====
Event	Gold		Silver		Bronze	
Men's 10 km open water	Kristóf Rasovszky; Hungary	1:50:52.7	Oliver Klemet; Germany	1:50:54.8	Dávid Betlehem; Hungary	1:51:09.0
Women's 10 km open water	Sharon van Rouwendaal; Netherlands	2:03:34.2	Moesha Johnson; Australia	2:03:39.7	Ginevra Taddeucci; Italy	2:03:42.8

== Records ==
The following world and Olympic records were set during the competition:

=== World records ===
Date	Round	Event	Time	Name	Nation
31 July	Final	Men's 100 metre freestyle	46.40	Pan Zhanle	China
3 August	Final	Mixed 4 × 100 metre medley relay	3:37.43	Ryan Murphy (52.08); Nic Fink (58.29); Gretchen Walsh (55.18); Torri Huske (51.88)	United States
4 August	Final	Men's 1500 metre freestyle	14:30.67	Bobby Finke	United States
4 August	Final	Women's 4 × 100 metre medley relay	3:49.63	Regan Smith (57.28); Lilly King (1:04.90); Gretchen Walsh (55.03); Torri Huske (52.42)	United States

=== Olympic records ===
Date	Round	Event	Established for	Time	Name	Nation
27 July	Semifinal 1	Women's 100 metre butterfly	(same)	55.38	Gretchen Walsh	United States
27 July	Final	Women's 4 × 100 metre freestyle relay	(same)	3:28.92	Mollie O'Callaghan (52.24); Shayna Jack (52.35); Emma McKeon (52.39); Meg Harris (51.94)	Australia
27 July	Final	Men's 4 × 100 metre freestyle relay	Men's 100 metre freestyle	46.92	Pan Zhanle	China
28 July	Final	Men's 400 metre individual medley	(same)	4:02.95	Léon Marchand	France
29 July	Final	Women's 200 metre freestyle	(same)	1:53.27	Mollie O'Callaghan	Australia
30 July	Final	Women's 100 metre backstroke	(same)	57.33	Kaylee McKeown	Australia
30 July	Final	Men's 800 metre freestyle	(same)	7:38.19	Daniel Wiffen	Ireland
31 July	Final	Men's 200 metre butterfly	(same)	1:51.21	Léon Marchand	France
31 July	Final	Women's 1500 metre freestyle	(same)	15:30.02	Katie Ledecky	United States
31 July	Final	Men's 200 metre breaststroke	(same)	2:05.85	Léon Marchand	France
1 August	Final	Women's 200 metre butterfly	(same)	2:03.03	Summer McIntosh	Canada
1 August	Final	Women's 4 × 200 metre freestyle relay	(same)	7:38.08	Mollie O'Callaghan (1:53.52); Lani Pallister (1:55.61); Brianna Throssell (1:56.00); Ariarne Titmus (1:52.95)	Australia
2 August	Final	Women's 200 metre backstroke	(same)	2:03.73	Kaylee McKeown	Australia
2 August	Final	Men's 200 metre individual medley	(same)	1:54.06	Léon Marchand	France
3 August	Semifinal 2	Women's 50 metre freestyle	(same)	23.66	Sarah Sjöström	Sweden
3 August	Final	Women's 200 metre individual medley	(same)	2:06.56	Summer McIntosh	Canada
4 August	Final	Women's 4 × 100 metre medley relay	Women's 100 metre backstroke	57.28	Regan Smith	United States

== See also ==
- Swimming at the 2024 Summer Paralympics
- Swimming at the Summer Olympics
