= Swimming at the 2023 World Aquatics Championships – Men's 1500 metre freestyle =

Men's 1500 metre freestyle at the 2023 World Aquatics Championships
- Venue: Marine Messe Fukuoka
- Location: Fukuoka, Japan
- Dates: 29 July (heats); 30 July (final)
- Competitors: 29 from 24 nations
- Winning time: 14:31.54

Medalists
gold medal	Ahmed Hafnaoui	Tunisia
silver medal	Bobby Finke	United States
bronze medal	Samuel Short	Australia

The men's 1500 metre freestyle competition at the 2023 World Aquatics Championships was held on 29 and 30 July 2023. Swimming World called the race an "epic duel".

== Records ==
Prior to the competition, the existing world and championship records were as follows.

World record	Sun Yang (CHN)	14:31.02	London, England	4 August 2012
Competition record	Gregorio Paltrinieri (ITA)	14:32.80	Budapest, Hungary	25 June 2022

The following new records were set during this competition.

Date	Event	Name	Nationality	Time	Record
30 July	Final	Ahmed Hafnaoui	Tunisia	14:31.54	CR

== Results ==
=== Heats ===
The heats were started on 29 July at 11:52.

Rank	Heat	Lane	Name	Nationality	Time	Notes
1	2	5	Bobby Finke	United States	14:43.06	Q
2	2	4	Daniel Wiffen	Ireland	14:43.50	Q
3	3	8	Ahmed Hafnaoui	Tunisia	14:49.53	Q
4	3	3	Lukas Märtens	Germany	14:51.20	Q
5	3	5	Mykhailo Romanchuk	Ukraine	14:52.15	Q
6	3	6	Samuel Short	Australia	14:53.38	Q
7	3	7	Kristóf Rasovszky	Hungary	14:54.09	Q
8	3	1	David Aubry	France	14:54.29	Q
9	3	0	Marwan Elkamash	Egypt	14:55.19	
10	2	2	Damien Joly	France	14:56.31	
11	3	2	Charlie Clark	United States	14:57.16	
12	2	3	Fei Liwei	China	14:57.50	
13	2	8	Luca De Tullio	Italy	14:57.68	
14	2	6	Daniel Jervis	Great Britain	14:57.88	
15	2	1	Dávid Betlehem	Hungary	14:59.76	
16	1	4	Krzysztof Chmielewski	Poland	15:01.89	
17	2	0	Henrik Christiansen	Norway	15:02.31	
18	1	5	Dimitrios Markos	Greece	15:07.61	
19	2	7	Carlos Garach	Spain	15:08.02	
20	3	4	Florian Wellbrock	Germany	15:10.33	
21	2	9	Ahmed Akaram	Egypt	15:11.06	
22	1	3	Alfonso Mestre	Venezuela	15:14.10	NR
23	1	7	Righardt Muller	South Africa	15:33.82	
24	1	1	Ratthawit Thammananthachote	Thailand	15:39.46	
25	1	2	Aryan Nehra	India	15:39.47	
26	1	8	Rodolfo Falcón Jr.	Cuba	15:49.72	
27	1	6	Nguyễn Hữu Kim Sơn	Vietnam	16:20.45	
28	1	0	Timothy Leberl	Mauritius	16:27.67	NR
29	1	9	Hendrik Powdar	Suriname	17:58.15	
	3	9	Kim Woo-min	South Korea	DNS	

=== Final ===
The final started on 30 July at 20:16.

Rank	Lane	Name	Nationality	Time	Notes
1st place, gold medalist(s)	3	Ahmed Hafnaoui	Tunisia	14:31.54	CR, AF
2nd place, silver medalist(s)	4	Bobby Finke	United States	14:31.59	AM
3rd place, bronze medalist(s)	7	Samuel Short	Australia	14:37.28	
4	5	Daniel Wiffen	Ireland	14:43.01	
5	6	Lukas Märtens	Germany	14:44.51	
6	1	Kristóf Rasovszky	Hungary	14:51.46	
7	2	Mykhailo Romanchuk	Ukraine	14:53.21	
8	8	David Aubry	France	14:56.63	
