= Vehicle registration plates of Tunisia =

Tunisia
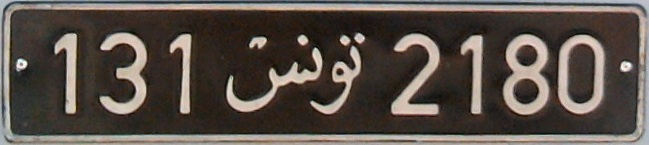
- Tunisian regular legal standard number plate
- Country: Tunisia
- Country code: TN

Current series
- Size: Front: 450 mm × 100 mm (17.7 in × 3.9 in); Rear: 520 mm × 110 mm (20.5 in × 4.3 in)
- Material: Aluminium
- Serial format: 12(3) Tunisia 4567
- Colour (front): White on black
- Colour (rear): White on black

Availability
- Issued by: Agence Technique des Transports Terrestres

Tunisian vehicle registration plates allow for the identification of vehicles registered in Tunisia.

== Format ==
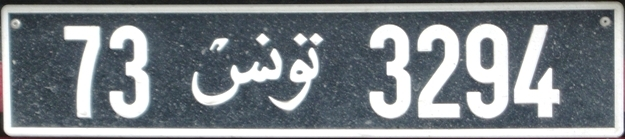
Standard issue license plate

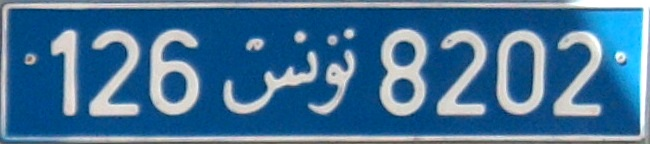
Rental car license plate

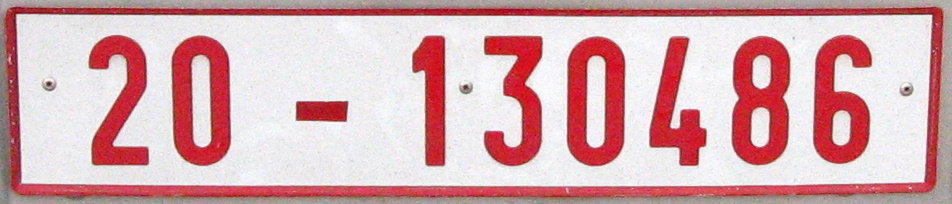
Government department license plate

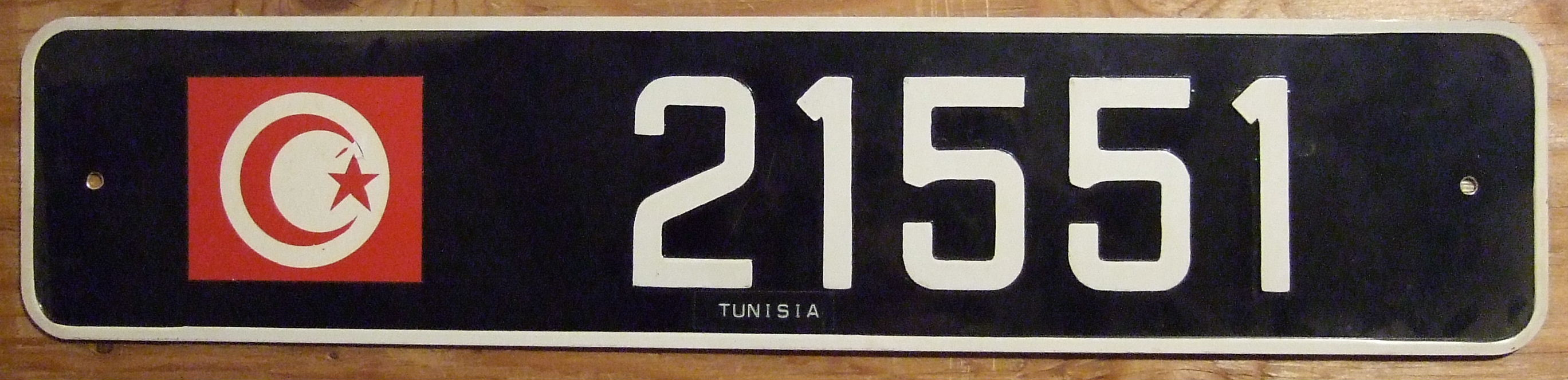
Military license plate

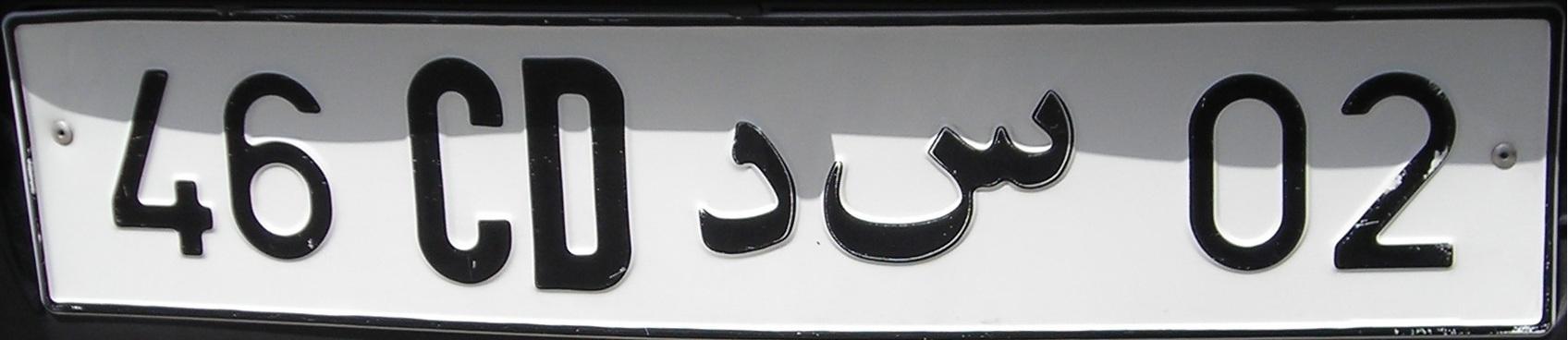
Diplomatic corps license plate

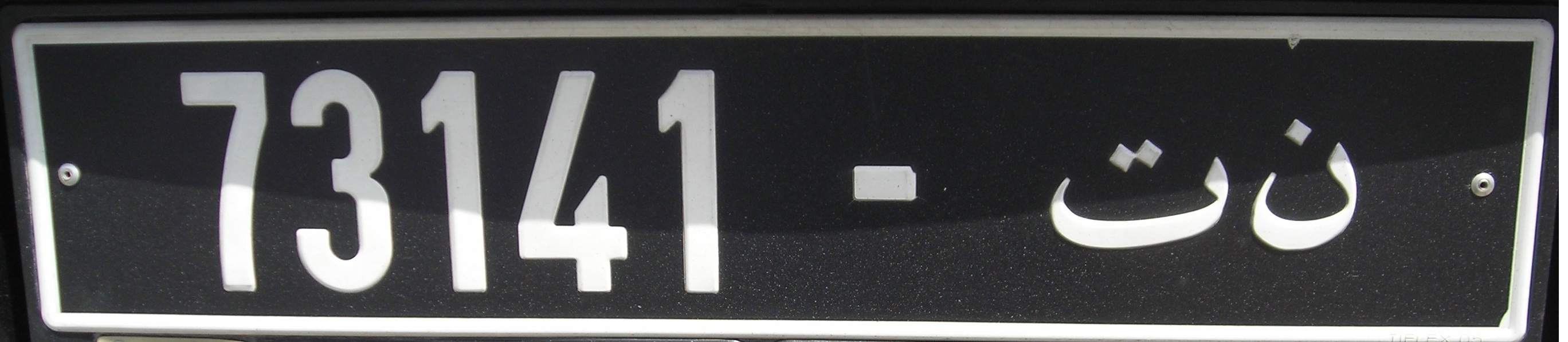
Temporary registration license plate

The plates take the form "XXX تونس XXXX" where X is a number between 0 and 9, while تونس means "Tunisia" in Arabic script. The writing is white on a black background. The first three digits designate the series and the last four digits denote the number of vehicle registrations in the series.

The passage from one series to the next occurs when a series exceeds 9999 vehicles.

Rental cars maintain the same except that the plates have white numbers on a blue background.

== Special plates ==
- Government departments and offices of state take the form XX - XXXXXX, with red writing on a white background. The left XX are numbers designating a specific ministry. For example, 03 is the Ministry of Justice, and 15 is the Ministry of Transport. The right XXXXX numbers designate the registration of the Ministry-owned vehicle.
- The military uses an acronym XXXXX, appearing in white on a black background with a Tunisian flag on the left side of the plate.
- Diplomatic Missions take the form of "XX CD س د XX" (CD stands for Corps Diplomatique) or "XX MD ب د XX" (MD stands for Mission Diplomatique), with black writing on a white background. Ambassadors' cars have the "CMD" inscription (Chef de Mission Diplomatique), in the form "XX CMD ر ب د XX" with 01 on the right side of the plate.
- Vehicles with a temporary registration: RS in the form XXXXX ن ت, with white writing on black background.
- Vehicles in testing by dealers take the form of XXXXX ع ع, with black writing on a yellow background.

== Dimensions ==
=== Motorcycles ===
Only a back registration plate is mandatory. It must be 170 mm long and 120 mm wide.

=== Other vehicles ===
Two registration plates are mandatory:

- The front plate must be 450 mm long and 100 mm wide.
- The back plate must be 520 mm long and 110 mm wide, or 275 mm long and 200 mm wide if it has two lines.

On most vehicles, front plates are larger than what is required, having the legal dimensions of the back plate, which is tolerated by the police.

== Series dates ==
Each series of vehicle registration refers to a year and hence its age. However, this depends on how many vehicles have been registered in a specific year. For example, a series can continue longer than one year if fewer than 9999 vehicles are registered. However, Tunisia registers an average of 50,000 new vehicles each year, five series of number plates are typically issued.

- 2008: 136, 135, 134, 133, 132 and 131.
- 2009: 140, 139, 138, 137, 136
- 2011: 159
- 2013: 165, 164, 163, 162, 161
- 2014: 176, 175, 174, 173, 172, 171, 170, 169, 168
- 2015: 178
- 2016: 191
- 2017: 200, 199, 198, 197, 196, 195, 194
- 2018: 203, 204, 205, 206, 207, 208
- 2019: 209, 210, 211, 212, 213, 214
- 2020: 215, 216, 217, 218, 219, 220
- 2021: 221, 222, 223, 224, 225, 226, 227
- 2022: 227, 228, 229, 230, 231, 232, 233, 234
- 2023: 234, 235, 236, 237, 238, 239, 240, 241
- 2024: 241, 242, 243, 244, 245, 246, 247, 248
- 2025: 248, 249, 250, 251, 252, 253, 254, 255, 256, 257
- 2026: 258, 259, 260, 261
