= Swimming at the 2023 World Aquatics Championships – Men's 800 metre freestyle =

Men's 800 metre freestyle at the 2023 World Aquatics Championships
- Venue: Marine Messe Fukuoka
- Location: Fukuoka, Japan
- Dates: 25 July (heats); 26 July (final)
- Competitors: 38 from 31 nations
- Winning time: 7:37.00

Medalists
gold medal	Ahmed Hafnaoui	Tunisia
silver medal	Samuel Short	Australia
bronze medal	Bobby Finke	United States

The men's 800 metre freestyle competition at the 2023 World Aquatics Championships was held on 25 and 26 July 2023.

== Records ==
Prior to the competition, the existing world and championship records were as follows.

World record	Zhang Lin (CHN)	7:32.12	Rome, Italy	26 July 2009
Competition record	Zhang Lin (CHN)	7:32.12	Rome, Italy	26 July 2009

== Results ==
=== Heats ===
The heats were started on 25 July at 11:32.

Rank	Heat	Lane	Name	Nationality	Time	Notes
1	3	5	Samuel Short	Australia	7:40.90	Q
2	3	1	Ahmed Hafnaoui	Tunisia	7:41.97	Q
3	3	3	Lukas Märtens	Germany	7:42.04	Q
4	4	6	Daniel Wiffen	Ireland	7:43.81	Q, NR
5	4	4	Bobby Finke	United States	7:43.87	Q
6	4	5	Mykhailo Romanchuk	Ukraine	7:44.07	Q
7	4	3	Gregorio Paltrinieri	Italy	7:44.89	Q
8	3	2	Guilherme Costa	Brazil	7:45.80	Q
9	3	4	Florian Wellbrock	Germany	7:45.87	
10	3	9	Marwan Elkamash	Egypt	7:46.55	NR
11	4	8	Luca De Tullio	Italy	7:46.87	
12	4	0	Dávid Betlehem	Hungary	7:47.02	
13	4	7	Damien Joly	France	7:47.44	
14	2	6	Kim Woo-min	South Korea	7:47.69	NR
15	2	2	Kristóf Rasovszky	Hungary	7:47.93	
16	2	7	Alfonso Mestre	Venezuela	7:48.66	NR
17	3	6	Elijah Winnington	Australia	7:49.24	
18	3	8	Henrik Christiansen	Norway	7:50.46	
19	4	1	Ross Dant	United States	7:54.23	
20	4	9	Pacome Bricout	France	7:55.20	
21	2	3	Dimitrios Markos	Greece	7:55.72	
22	2	4	Luke Turley	Great Britain	7:55.84	
23	3	7	Daniel Jervis	Great Britain	7:55.92	
24	3	0	Fei Liwei	China	7:56.69	
25	2	5	Carlos Garach	Spain	7:59.52	
26	2	8	Bar Soloveychik	Israel	7:59.65	
27	2	9	Aryan Nehra	India	8:00.76	=NR
28	2	1	Eric Brown	Canada	8:01.41	
29	1	5	Khiew Hoe Yean	Malaysia	8:05.11	NR
30	2	0	Zac Reid	New Zealand	8:06.94	
31	1	4	Righardt Muller	South Africa	8:07.08	
32	1	3	Mai Trần Tuấn Anh	Vietnam	8:08.56	
33	1	6	Glen Lim Jun Wei	Singapore	8:09.90	
34	1	2	Ratthawit Thammananthachote	Thailand	8:14.87	
35	1	7	Eduardo Cisternas	Chile	8:18.06	
36	1	1	Rodolfo Falcón Jr	Cuba	8:20.35	
37	1	0	Líggjas Joensen	Faroe Islands	8:41.85	
38	1	8	José Campo	El Salvador	8:57.60	
	4	2	Felix Auböck	Austria	DNS	

=== Final ===
The final was held on 26 July at 20:02.

Rank	Lane	Name	Nationality	Time	Notes
1st place, gold medalist(s)	5	Ahmed Hafnaoui	Tunisia	7:37.00	
2nd place, silver medalist(s)	4	Samuel Short	Australia	7:37.76	OC
3rd place, bronze medalist(s)	2	Bobby Finke	United States	7:38.67	AM
4	6	Daniel Wiffen	Ireland	7:39.19	ER
5	3	Lukas Märtens	Germany	7:39.48	NR
6	7	Mykhailo Romanchuk	Ukraine	7:43.08	
7	8	Guilherme Costa	Brazil	7:47.26	
8	1	Gregorio Paltrinieri	Italy	7:53.68	
