= Tunisia at the 2019 World Aquatics Championships =

- Flag of Tunisia
- FINA code: TUN
- National federation: Tunisian Swimming Federation
- Website: ftnatation.tn (in French)

in Gwangju, South Korea
- Competitors: 1 in 1 sport
- Medals: Gold 0 Silver 0 Bronze 0 Total 0

World Aquatics Championships appearances
- 1973; 1975; 1978; 1982; 1986; 1991; 1994; 1998; 2001; 2003; 2005; 2007; 2009; 2011; 2013; 2015; 2017; 2019; 2022; 2023; 2024

Tunisia competed at the 2019 World Aquatics Championships in Gwangju, South Korea from 12 to 28 July.

== Open water swimming ==
Tunisia qualified one male open water swimmer.

Men

Athlete	Event	Time	Rank
Oussama Mellouli	Men's 10 km	1:50:21.0	38
