= Swimming at the 2024 Summer Olympics – Men's 800-metre freestyle =

Men's 800 metre freestyle at the Games of the XXXIII Olympiad
- Medal ceremony for the event
- Venue: Paris La Défense Arena
- Dates: 29 July 2024 (Heats); 30 July 2024 (Final)
- Competitors: 31 from 24 nations
- Winning time: 7:38.19 OR

Medalists
1st place, gold medalist(s)		Daniel Wiffen	Ireland
2nd place, silver medalist(s)		Bobby Finke	United States
3rd place, bronze medalist(s)		Gregorio Paltrinieri	Italy

The men's 800 metre freestyle event at the 2024 Summer Olympics was held from 29 to 30 July 2024 at Paris La Défense Arena, which was converted to a swimming pool for the swimming events.

Australia's Samuel Short was considered the most likely to win the event by SwimSwam and Swimming World, while Ireland's Daniel Wiffen and defending Olympic champion Bobby Finke of the US were also predicted to win medals. In the heats (preliminary rounds), Short was eliminated while Lucas Henveaux of Belgium and Kuzey Tunçelli of Turkey both set national records.

In the final, Australia's Elijah Winnington led until the 350 metre mark, but was overtaken by Wiffen. Wiffen led until the 650 metre mark when he was overtaken by Gregorio Paltrinieri, who led until the final length when Wiffen retook the lead again. Wiffen won the gold with a new Olympic and European record of 7:38.19, while Finke won silver with 7:38.75 and Paltrinieri won bronze with 7:39.38. Retta Race from SwimSwam called the final a memorable race, and Wiffen's win made him the first Irish man to win a medal in Olympic swimming.

== Background ==
Bobby Finke of the US won the event at the previous Olympics, and was the 2022 World Champion in the event. At the 2023 World Championships, Finke won bronze behind Tunisia's Ahmed Hafnaoui and Australia's Samuel Short, who won gold and silver respectively. Hafnaoui withdrew from the Olympics due to an undisclosed injury, and no one had swum faster than Short's silver medal-winning time of 7:37.76 since.

Other medal contenders included Ireland's Daniel Wiffen, who won the event at the 2024 World Championships; Italy's Gregorio Paltrinieri, the 2019 World Champion and defending Olympic silver medallist; Mykhailo Romanchuk, the Olympic record holder in the event; and Florian Wellbrock of Germany, the 2022 World Championship silver medallist.

Both SwimSwam and Swimming World predicted Short would win, and that Wiffen and Finke would take the other two podium spots.

The event was held at Paris La Défense Arena, which was converted to a swimming pool for the swimming events.

== Qualification ==
Each National Olympic Committee (NOC) was permitted to enter a maximum of two qualified athletes in each individual event, but only if both of them had attained the Olympic Qualifying Time (OQT). For this event, the OQT was 7:51.65. World Aquatics then considered athletes qualifying through universality; NOCs were given one event entry for each gender, which could be used by any athlete regardless of qualification time, providing the spaces had not already been taken by athletes from that nation who had achieved the OQT. Finally, the rest of the spaces were filled by athletes who had met the Olympic Consideration Time (OCT), which was 7:54.01 for this event. In total, 30 athletes qualified through achieving the OQT, one athlete qualified through a universality place and one athlete qualified through achieving the OCT.

Top 10 fastest qualification times
Swimmer	Country	Time	Competition
Samuel Short	Australia	7:37.76	2023 World Aquatics Championships
Bobby Finke	United States	7:38.67	2023 World Aquatics Championships
Daniel Wiffen	Ireland	7:39.19	2023 World Aquatics Championships
Sven Schwarz	Germany	7:41.77	2023 European U-23 Championships
Elijah Winnington	Australia	7:42.95	2024 World Aquatics Championships
Gregorio Paltrinieri	Italy	7:42.98	2024 World Aquatics Championships
Florian Wellbrock	Germany	7:42.99	2023 Berlin Open
Mykhailo Romanchuk	Ukraine	7:43.08	2023 World Aquatics Championships
Luke Whitlock	United States	7:45.19	2024 United States Olympic Trials
Ahmed Jaouadi	Tunisia	7:45.31	2024 French Elite Championships

== Heats ==
Four heats (preliminary rounds) took place on 29 July 2024, starting at 11:28. (Note: All times are Central European Summer Time (UTC+2)) The swimmers with the best eight times in the heats advanced to the final. Wiffen qualified with the fastest time of 7:41.53 to win heat four, while Tunisia's Ahmed Jaouadi swam a personal best of 7:42.07 to win heat three. Paltrinieri and Finke also qualified, while Romanchuk and Short did not. SwimSwam speculated that Short's slower second half of the race could have been due to illness. Other qualifiers were Australia's Elijah Winnington, Germany's Sven Schwarz, Italy's Luca De Tullio and France's David Aubry.

Kuzey Tunçelli set a new national record of 7:47.29 for Turkey, and Lucas Henveaux set a new national record of 7:51.51. However, neither were fast enough to qualify.

Results
Rank	Heat	Lane	Swimmer	Nation	Time	Notes
1	4	5	Daniel Wiffen	Ireland	7:41.53	Q
2	3	2	Ahmed Jaouadi	Tunisia	7:42.07	Q
3	3	3	Gregorio Paltrinieri	Italy	7:42.48	Q
4	4	3	Elijah Winnington	Australia	7:42.86	Q
5	3	4	Bobby Finke	United States	7:43.00	Q
6	3	5	Sven Schwarz	Germany	7:43.67	Q
7	3	7	Luca De Tullio	Italy	7:44.07	Q
8	2	8	David Aubry	France	7:44.59	Q
9	4	4	Samuel Short	Australia	7:46.83	
10	3	8	Fei Liwei	China	7:47.11	
11	2	4	Kuzey Tunçelli	Turkey	7:47.29	NR
12	4	6	Florian Wellbrock	Germany	7:47.91	
13	1	6	Felix Auböck	Austria	7:48.49	
14	2	7	Zalán Sárkány	Hungary	7:48.90	
15	4	2	Luke Whitlock	United States	7:49.26	
16	3	1	Victor Johansson	Sweden	7:49.47	
17	3	6	Mykhailo Romanchuk	Ukraine	7:49.75	
18	1	3	Carlos Garach	Spain	7:50.07	
19	1	7	Lucas Henveaux	Belgium	7:51.51	NR
20	4	7	Guilherme Costa	Brazil	7:54.41	
21	4	8	Zhang Zhanshuo	China	7:54.44	
22	1	5	Ilia Sibirtsev	Uzbekistan	7:56.67	
23	2	3	Pacome Bricout	France	7:57.32	
24	2	2	Jon Jøntvedt	Norway	7:59.16	
25	2	1	Henrik Christiansen	Norway	8:00.55	
26	2	5	Dimitrios Markos	Greece	8:01.37	
27	4	1	Marwan Elkamash	Egypt	8:07.00	
28	1	2	Nguyễn Huy Hoàng	Vietnam	8:08.39	
29	2	6	Alfonso Mestre	Venezuela	8:12.03	
30	1	4	Vlad Stancu	Romania	8:20.78	
31	1	1	Théo Druenne	Monaco	8:25.01	

== Final ==
The final took place at 21:07 on 30 July. Winnington led until the 350 metre mark when Wiffen took the lead. Wiffen held the lead until 650 metres when he was overtaken by Paltrinieri. Paltrinieri continued in first until the final length, when Wiffen overtook him back to win gold with a new Olympic and European record of 7:38.19. Finke also passed Paltrinieri on the final 50 metres to win silver with 7:38.75, and Paltrinieri won bronze with 7:39.38. Retta Race from SwimSwam later called the final "a race to remember".

Wiffen's win made him the first Irish man to win a medal in Olympic swimming, and the Irish Prime Minister Simon Harris later tweeted, "Yes Daniel Wiffin! Masterful. Gold for Ireland. Those last 100 metres were mind blowing!! World class. Olympic record [sic]". Wiffen later said he was not focusing on this event as much as the 1500 metre freestyle, which was taking place a few days later. He also called it "the most painful 800 [he's] ever done".

Results
Rank	Lane	Swimmer	Nation	Time	Notes
1st place, gold medalist(s)	4	Daniel Wiffen	Ireland	7:38.19	OR, ER
2nd place, silver medalist(s)	2	Bobby Finke	United States	7:38.75	
3rd place, bronze medalist(s)	3	Gregorio Paltrinieri	Italy	7:39.38	
4	5	Ahmed Jaouadi	Tunisia	7:42.83	
5	7	Sven Schwarz	Germany	7:43.59	
5	8	David Aubry	France	7:43.59	
7	1	Luca De Tullio	Italy	7:46.16	
8	6	Elijah Winnington	Australia	7:48.36	

Statistics
Name	200 metre split	400 metre split	600 metre split	Time	Stroke rate (strokes/min)
Daniel Wiffen	1:52.62	3:48.82	5:44.71	7:38.19	39.8
Bobby Finke	1:52.77	3:48.89	5:45.28	7:38.75	40.0
Gregorio Paltrinieri	1:53.21	3:49.42	5:44.72	7:39.38	44.6
Ahmed Jaouadi	1:52.53	3:49.49	5:46.40	7:42.83	38.6
Sven Schwarz	1:52.65	3:49.80	5:47.79	7:43.59	42.9
David Aubry	1:53.84	3:51.57	5:48.36	7:43.59	35.9
Luca De Tullio	1:54.01	3:51.43	5:49.23	7:46.16	38.8
Elijah Winnington	1:51.22	3:49.18	5:49.36	7:48.36	41.1
