= Tunisia at the 2023 World Aquatics Championships =

- Flag of Tunisia
- FINA code: TUN
- National federation: Tunisian Swimming Federation
- Website: ftnatation.tn

in Fukuoka, Japan
- Competitors: 1 in 1 sport
- Medals Ranked 12th: Gold 2 Silver 1 Bronze 0 Total 3

World Aquatics Championships appearances
- 1973; 1975; 1978; 1982; 1986; 1991; 1994; 1998; 2001; 2003; 2005; 2007; 2009; 2011; 2013; 2015; 2017; 2019; 2022; 2023; 2024

Tunisia is set to compete at the 2023 World Aquatics Championships in Fukuoka, Japan from 14 to 30 July.

== Medalists ==
Medal	Name	Sport	Event	Date
Gold	Ahmed Hafnaoui	Swimming	Men's 800 m freestyle	July 26
Gold	Ahmed Hafnaoui	Swimming	Men's 1500 m freestyle	July 30
Silver	Ahmed Hafnaoui	Swimming	Men's 400 m freestyle	July 23

== Swimming ==
Tunisia entered 1 swimmer.

Men

Athlete	Event	Heat		Final	
Athlete	Event	Time	Rank	Time	Rank
Ahmed Hafnaoui	400 metre freestyle	3:44.34	4 Q	3:40.70 AF	2nd place, silver medalist(s)
Ahmed Hafnaoui	800 metre freestyle	7:41.97	2 Q	7:37.00	1st place, gold medalist(s)
Ahmed Hafnaoui	1500 metre freestyle	14:49.53	3 Q	14:31.54 CR, AF	1st place, gold medalist(s)
