= Swimming at the 2026 Mediterranean Games – Men's 800 metre freestyle =

Men's 800 metre freestyle at the 2026 Mediterranean Games
- Venue: Stadio del Nuoto Torre d'Ayala
- Location: Taranto, Italy
- Dates: 23 August
- Competitors: 11 from 8 nations
- Winning time: 7:46.61

Medalists
gold medal	Luca De Tullio	Italy
silver medal	Dimitrios Markos	Greece
bronze medal	Ahmed Jaouadi	Tunisia

The Men's 800 metre freestyle competition at the 2026 Mediterranean Games was held on 23 August 2026 at the Torre d'Ayala Swimming Stadium in Taranto, Italy.

== Records ==
Prior to this competition, the existing world record was as follows:

Record	Athlete	Time	Location	Date
World record	Lin Zhang (CHN)	7:32.12	Rome, Italy	29 July 2009

== Results ==
=== Final ===
The final was held at 19:10 and was contested in two heats. The three swimmers with the slowest entry times competed in the slow heat, while the other eight swimmers competed in the fastest heat. The final ranking was determined by the times recorded across both heats.

Rank	Heat	Lane	Name	Nationality	Time	Notes
1st place, gold medalist(s)	1	2	Luca De Tullio	Italy	7:46.61	GR
2nd place, silver medalist(s)	1	5	Dimitrios Markos	Greece	7:55.05	
3rd place, bronze medalist(s)	1	4	Ahmed Jaouadi	Tunisia	7:55.30	
4	1	6	Franko Grgić	Croatia	7:57.27	
5	1	3	Cristóbal Vargas	Spain	7:58.83	
6	1	7	Davide Marchello	Italy	8:01.10	
7	1	8	Nikola Simić	Serbia	8:02.06	
8	1	1	Vasileios Kakoulakis	Greece	8:05.46	
9	2	5	Rodrigo Borges	Portugal	8:12.02	
10	2	4	Emir Batur Albayrak	Turkey	8:12.10	
11	2	3	Marin Mogić	Croatia	8:19.01	
