= Bobby Finke =

American swimmer (born 1999)

- Finke (left) in 2024 at the Summer Olympics

Personal information
- Full name: Robert Christian Finke
- Nickname: "Bobby"
- Born: November 6, 1999 (age 26) Tampa, Florida, U.S.
- Height: 6 ft 1 in (185 cm)
- Weight: 172 lb (78 kg)

Sport
- Country: United States
- Sport: Swimming
- Strokes: Distance freestyle, individual medley
- Club: Saint Petersburg Aquatics
- College team: University of Florida
- Coach: Anthony Nesty
Medal record
Men's swimming
Representing the United States
Event	1st	2nd	3rd
Olympic Games	3	1	0
World Championships	1	2	2
Pan Pacific Championships	0	1	2
Total	4	4	4
Olympic Games
Gold medal – first place	2020 Tokyo	800 m freestyle
Gold medal – first place	2020 Tokyo	1500 m freestyle
Gold medal – first place	2024 Paris	1500 m freestyle
Silver medal – second place	2024 Paris	800 m freestyle
World Championships
Gold medal – first place	2022 Budapest	800 m freestyle
Silver medal – second place	2022 Budapest	1500 m freestyle
Silver medal – second place	2023 Fukuoka	1500 m freestyle
Bronze medal – third place	2023 Fukuoka	800 m freestyle
Bronze medal – third place	2025 Singapore	1500 m freestyle
Pan Pacific Championships
Silver medal – second place	2026 Irvine	800 m freestyle
Bronze medal – third place	2026 Irvine	400 m medley
Bronze medal – third place	2026 Irvine	1500 m freestyle
Junior Pan Pacific Championships
Gold medal – first place	2016 Maui	800 m freestyle
Gold medal – first place	2016 Maui	1500 m freestyle

Robert Christian Finke (/ˈfɪŋk/ FINK; born November 6, 1999), better known as Bobby Finke, is an American competitive swimmer. He won two gold medals for the United States in the 2020 Summer Olympics: the men's 800-meter and 1500-meter freestyle swims. Finke successfully defended his title in 1500 m freestyle at the 2024 Summer Olympics, setting the world record. He added a silver medal in the 800 m freestyle. He swam for the University of Florida in Gainesville, Florida, from 2018 to 2022 under Coach Anthony Nesty. He currently swims as part of the pro group at UF. Before swimming in college, Finke swam for coach Fred Lewis on the Saint Petersburg Aquatics club team (also known as SPA), located in Saint Petersburg, Florida.

== Career ==
=== Early career ===
At 14 years old, Finke broke the Florida Age Group State Championships (FLAGS) 800m freestyle meet record with a time of 8:25.20. He proceeded to break the 1500m freestyle meet record, dropping over 15 seconds, for a time of 15:56.82. Finke also won the USA Swimming Open Water Junior Nationals by finishing first of all swimmers under 18 years of age. Finke finished seventh overall in a field that included both the pro open water swimmers as well as collegiate swimmers.

=== High school career ===
Finke graduated from Countryside High School in Clearwater, Florida, where he competed with his high school team. He also swam club for Saint Petersburg Aquatics, where he was coached by Fred Lewis, and swam alongside notable swimmers, such as Melanie Margalis and Nic Fink. Finke accomplished much during his high school years. Finke became a Team USA World Championship qualifier at FINA in 2017, and a member of the USA Swimming National team. At the 2018 Phillips 66 National Championships Finke finished second in the 1,500-meter freestyle in 14:55.34. Finke posted the third-fastest time ever in the 1,500-meter freestyle at the 2018 Pan Pacific Championships with a mark of 14:48.79. He also became a two-time NISCA All-American and a two-time USA Swimming Scholastic All-America. Finke also was a state champion in several swimming events in Florida's Division 4A. Entering college, Finke was ranked the No. 18-ranked recruit overall, and No. 1 swimmer in the state of Florida for the 2018 class.

=== College career ===
Robert Finke swam for the University of Florida in Gainesville, Florida from 2018 to 2022 where he was a top scorer for the team. Finke's college coach was Anthony Nesty. During his time at University of Florida, Finke earned a plethora of accolades. Some of these accolades are eleven-time All-American, 2020 All-SEC First Team, 2020 SEC Champion (1,650 Free), 2020 SEC Academic Honor Roll, 2019 SEC Champion (1,650 free and 400 IM), 2019 All-SEC First-Team, 2019 Co-SEC Freshmen Swimmer of the Year, 2019 SEC All-Freshman team, 2021 NCAA Champion in the 400yIM and the 1650y Freestyle and 2022 NCAA Champion in the 1650y Freestyle. Finke turned professional following the 2022 NCAA Championships and has continued training at the University of Florida under coach Anthony Nesty.

=== 2020 Olympic trials ===
The autumn before the 2020 Summer Olympics, in November 2020, Finke won the gold medal in the 1500 meter freestyle with a time of 15:09.14, the silver medal in the 800 meter freestyle with a 7:53.05, and the silver medal in the 400 meter individual medley with a 4:18.08 at the 2020 U.S. Open Swimming Championships. In June 2021, Finke became one of 53 swimmers named to represent the United States at the 2020 Tokyo Olympic Games. He qualified in both the men's 800 meter freestyle and 1500 meter freestyle, placing first in both events at the 2020 US Olympic Trials in Omaha, Nebraska.

=== 2020 Summer Olympics ===
2020 Summer Olympics
Gold medal – first place	800 metre freestyle	7:41.87 (NR)
Gold medal – first place	1500 metre freestyle	14:39.65

In his first Olympic event, Finke won the gold in the men's 800m freestyle, setting a new American record with a time of 7:41.87. He also placed first in the men's 1500m freestyle with a time of 14:39:65, making him the first American man to win the event since 1984. In the finals of both events, Finke was behind with 50 meters to go, but made a last-minute surge to win. He swam the final 50 meters of the 1500 in just 25.78 seconds, more than a full second faster than any split by any other swimmer in the finals. It was also faster than any competitor's final lap in the men's 200m finals and more than half a second faster than the 26.39 seconds for his own final 50 meters in the 800m.

=== 2024 Olympic trials ===
In June 2024, at the U.S. Olympic trials, Finke competed in both the men's 800m freestyle and the men's 1500m freestyle. He finished first in both events, securing his spot to defend his gold medal in the 2024 Paris Olympics.

=== 2024 Summer Olympics ===
2024 Summer Olympics
Silver medal – second place	800 metre freestyle	7:38.75
Gold medal – first place	1500 metre freestyle	14:30.67 (WR)

Finke competed in both the men's 800m freestyle and the men's 1500m freestyle. He took a silver in the 800m freestyle, finishing in 7:38.75, about a half-second behind gold medalist Daniel Wiffen of Ireland. In the 1500m freestyle, he became the only U.S. male swimmer to win an individual gold medal, finishing in a world-record time of 14:30.67. Unlike his previous Olympic finals, Finke led the 1500m from start to finish, and swam the final lap in just 26.27 seconds to beat Gregorio Paltrinieri by 3.88 seconds.

=== Records ===
Finke set the world record in the 1500m Freestyle with a time of 14:30.67 to win gold at the 2024 Paris Olympics.

Finke first swum an American Record at the 2020 Olympic Games in the men's 800m Freestyle. In the heats of the event, he went a time of 7:42.72. In the final, his time of 7:41.87 broke his record. He reset the record at the 2022 World Aquatics Championships with a time of 7:39.36. A year later, at the 2023 World Aquatics Championships, he lowered the record to a 7:38.67.

Also at the 2022 World Aquatics Championships, Finke broke the American record in the 1500m Freestyle with a time of 14:36.70. He again reset the record at the 2023 World Aquatics Championships by swimming a 14:31.59.

Finke also holds the U.S. Open record (the fastest time on U.S. soil) in the 800m Freestyle. He first set it with a time of 7:43.32 from the 2022 Phillips 66 US International Team Trials. He then lowered it to 7:40.34 at the 2023 Phillips 66 US International Team Trials.

Finke owns the U.S. Open record in the 1500m freestyle as well. He set it with a 14:42.81 at the 2023 Phillips 66 US International Team Trials. He later broke it at the 2024 U.S. Olympic Team Trials with a time of 14:40.28.

In the short course pool, Finke set the American record in the 1650y Freestyle with a time of 14:12.08 at the 2020 SEC Championships.

== International championships ==
Meet	400 freestyle	800 freestyle	1500 freestyle	400 medley
PACJ 2016	1st (b)	1st place, gold medalist(s)	1st place, gold medalist(s)	1st (b)
WC 2017			21st	
PAC 2018	8th	5th	3rd (h)	
OG 2020		1st place, gold medalist(s)	1st place, gold medalist(s)	
WC 2022		1st place, gold medalist(s)	2nd place, silver medalist(s)	
WC 2023		3rd place, bronze medalist(s)	2nd place, silver medalist(s)	
OG 2024		2nd place, silver medalist(s)	1st place, gold medalist(s)	

== Personal bests ==
Short course
Event	Time	Meet	Date	Note(s)
1,650 yd freestyle	14:12.08	2020 SEC Swimming and Diving Championships	Feb. 18–22, 2020	NR
1,000 yd freestyle	8:34.63	2020 SEC Championships Swimming and Diving Championships	Feb. 18–22, 2020	

Long course
Event	Time	Meet	Date	Note(s)
1500 m freestyle	14:30.67	2024 Olympics	August 4, 2024	WR, OR
800 m freestyle	7:38.67	2023 World Championships	July 26, 2023	NR
400 m medley	4:07.46	2025 US National Championships	June 5, 2025	

== Awards and honors ==
- Golden Goggle Awards Male Athlete of the Year: 2022, 2024
- Golden Goggle Awards Male Race of the Year: 2021, 2022, 2023, 2024

== Personal life ==
Finke was born in Tampa, Florida, on November 6, 1999. Finke's mother, Jeanne, swam for Ball State, while his father Joe is a swim coach with Saint Petersburg Aquatics. Finke also has two older sisters: Autumn Skye Finke, who swam for the University of Florida, and Ariel Summer Finke, who swam for Florida State University and North Carolina State University.
