= Tunisia at the 2017 World Aquatics Championships =

- Flag of Tunisia
- FINA code: TUN
- National federation: Federation Tunisienne de Natation
- Website: ftnatation.com

in Budapest, Hungary
- Competitors: 3 in 2 sports
- Medals: Gold 0 Silver 0 Bronze 0 Total 0

World Aquatics Championships appearances
- 1973; 1975; 1978; 1982; 1986; 1991; 1994; 1998; 2001; 2003; 2005; 2007; 2009; 2011; 2013; 2015; 2017; 2019; 2022; 2023; 2024

Tunisia competed at the 2017 World Aquatics Championships in Budapest, Hungary from 14 to 30 July.

== Open water swimming ==
Tunisia has entered one open water swimmer

Athlete	Event	Time	Rank
Haythem Abdelkhalek	Men's 5 km	56:53.9	45
Haythem Abdelkhalek	Men's 10 km	1:59:58.2	50
Haythem Abdelkhalek	Men's 25 km	5:42:50.7	23

== Swimming ==
Tunisia received a Universality invitation from FINA to send two male swimmers to the World Championships.

Athlete	Event	Heat		Semifinal		Final	
Athlete	Event	Time	Rank	Time	Rank	Time	Rank
Wassim Elloumi	Men's 50 m breaststroke	DNS		Did not advance			
Wassim Elloumi	Men's 100 m breaststroke	DNS		Did not advance			
Wassim Elloumi	Men's 200 m breaststroke	DNS		Did not advance			
Mohamed Lagili	Men's 200 m freestyle	1:50.33	45	Did not advance			
Mohamed Lagili	Men's 400 m freestyle	3:55.47	36	—		Did not advance	
