= Tunisia at the 2011 World Aquatics Championships =

- Flag of Tunisia
- FINA code: TUN
- National federation: Federation Tunisienne de Natation
- Website: ftnatation.com

in Shanghai, China
- Competitors: 4 in 1 sport
- Medals: Gold 0 Silver 0 Bronze 0 Total 0

World Aquatics Championships appearances
- 1973; 1975; 1978; 1982; 1986; 1991; 1994; 1998; 2001; 2003; 2005; 2007; 2009; 2011; 2013; 2015; 2017; 2019; 2022; 2023; 2024

Tunisia competed at the 2011 World Aquatics Championships in Shanghai, China between 16 and 31 July.

== Swimming ==
Tunisia qualified 4 swimmers.

Men

Athlete	Event	Heats		Semifinals		Final	
Athlete	Event	Time	Rank	Time	Rank	Time	Rank
Ahmed Mathlouthi	Men's 400 m freestyle	4:08.40	40	—		did not advance	
Oussama Mellouli	Men's 400 m freestyle	3:45.90	4 Q	—		3:45.31	7
Oussama Mellouli	Men's 800 m freestyle	7:48.86	5 Q	—		7:45.99	4
Oussama Mellouli	Men's 1500 m freestyle	15:13.56	15	—		did not advance	
Taki Mrabet	Men's 200 m individual medley	2:01.44	24	did not advance			
Taki Mrabet	Men's 400 m individual medley	4:18.99	16	—		did not advance	

Women

Athlete	Event	Heats		Semifinals		Final	
Athlete	Event	Time	Rank	Time	Rank	Time	Rank
Sarra Lajnef	Women's 400 m individual medley	4:51.89	29	—		did not advance	
