= Tunisia at the 2015 World Aquatics Championships =

- Flag of Tunisia
- FINA code: TUN
- National federation: Federation Tunisienne de Natation
- Website: ftnatation.com

in Kazan, Russia
- Competitors: 3 in 2 sports
- Medals: Gold 0 Silver 0 Bronze 0 Total 0

World Aquatics Championships appearances
- 1973; 1975; 1978; 1982; 1986; 1991; 1994; 1998; 2001; 2003; 2005; 2007; 2009; 2011; 2013; 2015; 2017; 2019; 2022; 2023; 2024

Tunisia competed at the 2015 World Aquatics Championships in Kazan, Russia from 24 July to 9 August 2015.

== Open water swimming ==
Tunisia has qualified two swimmers to compete in the open water marathon.

Athlete	Event	Time	Rank
Haythem Abdelkhalek	Men's 10 km	2:03:26.7	60
Haythem Abdelkhalek	Men's 25 km	did not finish	
Oussama Mellouli	Men's 10 km	1:50:50.2	23

== Swimming ==
Tunisian swimmers have achieved qualifying standards in the following events (up to a maximum of 2 swimmers in each event at the A-standard entry time, and 1 at the B-standard):

Men

Athlete	Event	Heat		Semifinal		Final	
Athlete	Event	Time	Rank	Time	Rank	Time	Rank
Ahmed Mathlouthi	200 m freestyle	1:50.61	43	did not advance			
Ahmed Mathlouthi	400 m freestyle	3:51.46	30	—		did not advance	
Ahmed Mathlouthi	200 m individual medley	2:05.37	37	did not advance			
Ahmed Mathlouthi	400 m individual medley	DNS		—		did not advance	
