= Swimming at the 2024 World Aquatics Championships – Men's 1500 metre freestyle =

Men's 1500 metre freestyle at the Swimming at the 2024 World Aquatics Championships
- Venue: Aspire Dome
- Location: Doha, Qatar
- Dates: 17 February (heats); 18 February (final)
- Competitors: 31 from 26 nations
- Winning time: 14:34.07

Medalists
gold medal	Daniel Wiffen	Ireland
silver medal	Florian Wellbrock	Germany
bronze medal	David Aubry	France

The Men's 1500 metre freestyle competition at the 2024 World Aquatics Championships was held on 17 and 18 February 2024.

== Qualification ==
Each National Federation was permitted to enter a maximum of two qualified athletes in each individual event, but only if both of them had attained the "A" standard qualification time at approved qualifying events. For this event, the "A" standard qualification time was 15:04.64 seconds. Federations could enter one athlete into the event if they met the "B" standard qualification time. For this event, the "B" standard qualification time was 15:36.30. Athletes could also enter the event if they had met an "A" or "B" standard in a different event and their Federation had not entered anyone else. Additional considerations applied to Federations who had few swimmers enter through the standard qualification times. Federations in this category could at least enter two men and two women into the competition, all of whom could enter into up to two events.

== Records ==
Prior to the competition, the existing world and championship records were as follows.

World record	Sun Yang (CHN)	14:31.02	London, England	4 August 2012
Competition record	Ahmed Hafnaoui (TUN)	14:31.54	Fukuoka, Japan	30 July 2023

== Results ==
=== Heats ===
The heats were started on 17 February at 10:37.

Rank	Heat	Lane	Name	Nationality	Time	Notes
1	3	4	Florian Wellbrock	Germany	14:48.43	Q
2	3	2	David Aubry	France	14:49.01	Q
3	3	8	Dávid Betlehem	Hungary	14:51.48	Q
4	3	5	Mykhailo Romanchuk	Ukraine	14:51.83	Q
5	3	3	Sven Schwarz	Germany	14:53.08	Q
6	4	5	Daniel Wiffen	Ireland	14:54.29	Q
7	3	1	Fei Liwei	China	14:54.36	Q
8	4	2	Kuzey Tunçelli	Turkey	14:54.98	Q
9	4	3	Gregorio Paltrinieri	Italy	14:55.19	
10	4	6	Charlie Clark	United States	14:57.44	
11	2	6	Victor Johansson	Sweden	14:58.73	
12	3	6	Kristóf Rasovszky	Hungary	14:59.44	
13	4	7	Luca De Tullio	Italy	15:00.22	
14	2	4	Shogo Takeda	Japan	15:04.50	
15	4	9	Krzysztof Chmielewski	Poland	15:04.93	
16	3	7	Damien Joly	France	15:05.76	
17	4	4	Ahmed Hafnaoui	Tunisia	15:09.02	
18	4	8	Henrik Christiansen	Norway	15:12.25	
19	4	1	Carlos Garach Benito	Spain	15:16.00	
20	4	0	Vlad Stancu	Romania	15:20.50	
21	3	9	Zhang Zhanshuo	China	15:20.69	
22	2	3	Nguyễn Huy Hoàng	Vietnam	15:22.86	
23	2	5	Ahmed Akaram	Egypt	15:28.54	
24	3	0	Emir Batur Albayrak	Turkey	15:29.69	
25	2	7	Khiew Hoe Yean	Malaysia	15:31.23	
26	2	1	Dylan Porges	Mexico	15:32.79	
27	2	0	Diego Dulieu	Honduras	15:36.02	
28	2	8	Ratthawit Thammananthachote	Thailand	15:38.84	
29	1	3	Nikola Ǵuretanoviḱ	North Macedonia	16:04.07	
30	1	4	Rodolfo Falcón Jr.	Cuba	16:11.17	
31	1	5	Ilias El Fallaki	Morocco	16:19.73	
	2	2	Guilherme Costa	Brazil	Did not start	

=== Final ===
The final was held on 18 February at 19:16.

Rank	Lane	Name	Nationality	Time	Notes
1st place, gold medalist(s)	7	Daniel Wiffen	Ireland	14:34.07	NR
2nd place, silver medalist(s)	4	Florian Wellbrock	Germany	14:44.61	
3rd place, bronze medalist(s)	5	David Aubry	France	14:44.85	
4	3	Dávid Betlehem	Hungary	14:46.44	
5	6	Mykhailo Romanchuk	Ukraine	14:47.54	
6	2	Sven Schwarz	Germany	14:47.89	
7	1	Fei Liwei	China	14:50.51	
8	8	Kuzey Tunçelli	Turkey	14:59.76	

== Sources ==
- "Competition Regulations" (PDF). World Aquatics. Archived (PDF) from the original on 15 February 2026.
