= Daniel Wiffen =

Irish swimmer (born 2001)

Personal information
- Born: 14 July 2001 (age 25) Leeds, England
- Home town: Magheralin, County Down, Northern Ireland
- Height: 1.94 m (6 ft 4 in)

Sport
- Country: Ireland; Northern Ireland
- Sport: Swimming
Medal record
Men's swimming
Representing Ireland
Olympic Games
Gold medal – first place	2024 Paris	800 m freestyle
Bronze medal – third place	2024 Paris	1500 m freestyle
World Championships
Gold medal – first place	2024 Doha	800 m freestyle
Gold medal – first place	2024 Doha	1500 m freestyle
European U-23 Championships
Gold medal – first place	2023 Dublin	1500 m freestyle
Silver medal – second place	2023 Dublin	800 m freestyle
Silver medal – second place	2023 Dublin	400 m freestyle
European Championships (SC)
Gold medal – first place	2023 Otopeni	400 m freestyle
Gold medal – first place	2023 Otopeni	800 m freestyle
Gold medal – first place	2023 Otopeni	1500 m freestyle
Gold medal – first place	2025 Lublin	1500 m freestyle
Bronze medal – third place	2025 Lublin	400 m freestyle
Bronze medal – third place	2025 Lublin	800 m freestyle
Representing Northern Ireland
Commonwealth Games
Silver medal – second place	2022 Birmingham	1500 m freestyle
Silver medal – second place	2026 Glasgow	1500 m freestyle

Daniel Wiffen (born 14 July 2001) is an Irish swimmer. He is an Olympic champion and bronze medalist, two-time world champion and four-time European short course champion.

Wiffen won the gold medal in the men's 800 metre freestyle and the bronze medal in the men's 1500 metre freestyle at the 2024 Summer Olympics in Paris, setting an Olympic record in the former event with the time of 7:38.19. He won the 800 metre freestyle and 1500 metre freestyle events at the 2024 World Aquatics Championships in Doha, becoming the first male Irish swimmer in history to win a medal at the World Championships.

Wiffen won gold medals in the 400, 800 and 1500 metre freestyle events at the 2023 European Championships (25m) in Otopeni, and the inaugural European Under-23 1500 metre freestyle title at the 2023 European U-23 Championships in Dublin. He competed at the 2022 Commonwealth Games for Northern Ireland, where he won the silver medal in the men's 1500 metre freestyle event.

In December 2024, he was named BBC Northern Ireland Sports Personality of the Year.

Wiffen holds the 800 metres freestyle short-course world record with a time of 7:20.46.

== Career ==
Wiffen competed in the men's 800 metres freestyle and 1500 metres freestyle events at the 2020 Summer Olympics in Tokyo. He won his first senior international medal at the 2022 Commonwealth Games, where he placed second in the men's 1500 metre freestyle event and competed for Northern Ireland. In December 2022, Wiffen broke the European record for the 800 metres freestyle short course, becoming the first Irishman to hold a European record in swimming. He competed for Ireland at the 2023 European U-23 Championships in Dublin, where he became the inaugural European Under-23 champion in the 1500 metre freestyle event and won silver medals in the 400 and 800 metre freestyle events.

Wiffen won gold medals in the 400, 800 and 1500 metre freestyle events at the 2023 European Championships (25m) in Otopeni, where he also set a new world record in the 800 metre freestyle short course with a time of 7:20.46 and became the first Irish swimmer to win a European short-course gold medal. At the 2023 World Championships in Fukuoka, he broke the European record for the 800 metres long course with the time of 7:39.19. Wiffen won gold medals in the 800 metre freestyle and 1500 metre freestyle events at the 2024 World Aquatics Championships in Doha, becoming the first male Irish swimmer in history to win a medal at the World Championships.

Wiffen qualified for the 400m, 800m and 1500m freestyle events at the 2024 Summer Olympics in Paris, but decided not to compete in the 400m and instead swim in the 10 km open water swimming. He qualified in first place for the 800m freestyle final and on 30 July, he won the gold medal with a new Olympic record time of 7:38.19. The medal was Ireland's twelfth Olympic gold and first in swimming since the 1996 Summer Olympics in Atlanta. He was the second Irish swimming medalist at the 2024 games and the first individual Olympic Gold medal winner from Northern Ireland since 1972. On 4 August, Wiffen won the bronze medal in the 1500m freestyle final, with a time of 14:39.63. He placed 18th in the men's marathon 10 kilometre event and became the first Irish Olympian to compete in the discipline.

Wiffen postponed surgery for appendicitis to compete at the 2025 World Aquatics Championships in Singapore, opting for antibiotics instead. However, the condition forced him to withdraw from the 1500m event after finishing 8th in the 800m final 21.68 seconds back from Gold medalist Ahmed Jaouadi he had previously finished 16th in the 400m earlier that week, after the championship Wiffen went under surgery in August and later announced he would be moving his training base leaving Loughborough University after he had graduated and would join his brother Nathan at the Caltech university in California. Wiffen went to the 2025 European Short Course Championships in Lublin, He went on to defend his title in the 1500m and won Bronze in the 400m and 800m.

Prior to the Irish Open Swimming Championships in Bangor Wiffen announced he would swap California for Dublin if the times he swims at the meet are not what he was looking for. At the end of April, Wiffen announced the move from California to Dublin. He was confirmed to compete in the summer's Commonwealth Games and European Championships. Wiffen finished 5th in the 400m at the Commonwealth Games and 4th in the 800m behind a Australian podium sweep after the race he claimed he felt "a bit rusty". Wiffen won silver behind Sam Short in the 1500m at the 2026 Commonwealth Games.

== Major Championships Results ==
Olympic Results
Year	800m	1500m	OW 10 k
2020	14th	20th	—
2024	1st place, gold medalist(s)	3rd place, bronze medalist(s)	18th

=== World Championship Results ===
Year	400m	800m	1500m
2022	—	8th	9th
2023	—	4th	4th
2024	7th	1st place, gold medalist(s)	1st place, gold medalist(s)
2025	16th	8th	Withdrew

=== European Championship Results (50m) ===
Year	400m	800m	1500m	4x200m Freestyle Relay
2026	DNS	4th	8th	11th with Shortt, Rynn, Bailey

=== Commonwealth Games Results ===
Year	400m	800m	1500m
2022	4th	—	2nd place, silver medalist(s)
2026	5th	4th	2nd place, silver medalist(s)

=== European Championships Results (25m) ===
Year	400m	800m	1500m
2023	1st place, gold medalist(s)	(gold) WR	1st place, gold medalist(s)
2025	3rd place, bronze medalist(s)	3rd place, bronze medalist(s)	1st place, gold medalist(s)

== Personal life ==
Wiffen was born in Leeds, England, and moved to Magheralin at the age of two. He was a pupil of St Patrick's Grammar School, Armagh; in 2025 he gave his former school €29,000, from an Olympic grant, towards a new gym. He attends Loughborough University. He has three siblings, twin brother Nathan, sister Elizabeth and brother Ben. The family home is in Ballymacbredan County Down however the family associate with County Armagh. Wiffen's brother Nathan is also a swimmer who finished fourth in the 1500 metre freestyle event at the 2024 European Championships and narrowly missed out on the qualifying time for the event at the 2024 Summer Olympics.

Wiffen and his twin brother have a YouTube Channel. They both were extras in The Frankenstein Chronicles episode "Seeing Things" and the Game of Thrones episode "The Rains of Castamere," in which they appeared in the famous Red Wedding scene; in the latter, their sister Elizabeth also appeared as Neyela Frey.

== Records ==
Record	Event	Time	Meet	Date	Club
WR, NR	800m Freestyle (SC)	7.20.46	2023 European SC Championships	10 December 2023	Ireland
OR, NR	800m Freestyle	7:38.19	2024 Summer Olympics	30 July 2024	Ireland
NR	400m Freestyle	3:44.35	2023 Swim Open Stockholm	13 April 2023	Loughborough University
NR	1500m Freestyle	14:34.07	2024 World Championships	18 February 2024	Ireland
NR	400m Freestyle (SC)	3:35.47	2023 European SC Championships	5 December 2023	Ireland
NR	1500m Freestyle (SC)	14:09.11	2023 European SC Championships	7 December 2023	Ireland
NR	400m Individual Medley (SC)	4:11.05	2022 Scottish Championships	9 December 2022	Loughborough University
