= Ahmed Jaouadi =

Tunisian swimmer (born 2005)

Personal information
- Full name: Ahmed Jaouadi
- Nationality: Tunisian
- Born: May 30, 2005 (age 21) Tunis, Tunisia
- Height: 1.93 m (6 ft 4 in)

Sport
- Sport: Swimming
- Coach: Philippe Lucas
Medal record
Men's swimming
Representing Tunisia
Event	1st	2nd	3rd
World Championships (LC)	2	0	0
World Championships (SC)	1	0	1
Mediterranean Games	0	0	2
African Championships	2	1	1
Total	5	1	4
World Championships (LC)
Gold medal – first place	2025 Singapore	800 m freestyle
Gold medal – first place	2025 Singapore	1500 m freestyle
World Championships (SC)
Gold medal – first place	2024 Budapest	1500 m freestyle
Bronze medal – third place	2024 Budapest	800 m freestyle
Mediterranean Games
Bronze medal – third place	2026 Taranto	400 m freestyle
Bronze medal – third place	2026 Taranto	800 m freestyle
African Championships
Gold medal – first place	2022 Tunis	400 m freestyle
Gold medal – first place	2022 Tunis	1500 m freestyle
Silver medal – second place	2022 Tunis	800 m freestyle
Bronze medal – third place	2022 Tunis	200 m freestyle

Ahmed Jaouadi, born on May 30, 2005, is a Tunisian swimmer specializing in freestyle swimming.

In 2025, he became World Champion in the 800 m and 1500 m freestyle events in Singapore.

== Career ==
=== 2021 ===
While still in high school, Jaouadi won three medals at the Arab Swimming Championships (short course) in Abu Dhabi in October 2021 at the age of 16.

Two months later, he claimed first place in the 200 m and 400 m freestyle events at the French Junior Championships and finished third in the 200 m individual medley.

=== 2022 ===
At the 2022 African Swimming Championships in Tunis, Jaouadi competed in the senior category, winning gold in the 400 m and 1500 m freestyle, silver in the 800 m freestyle and 4×200 m relay, and bronze in the 200 m freestyle.

=== 2023 ===
At the French Junior Championships in Chartres, he took silver in the 400 m, 800 m, and 1500 m freestyle.

Later, at the Summer Open Junior Championships in Poitiers, he won gold in the 400 m and 1500 m freestyle and silver in the 800 m freestyle.

Upon aging out of the junior category, he joined Philippe Lucas’s elite group in Martigues.

At the French Short Course Nationals in Angers, he won the 400 m freestyle final.

=== 2024 ===
==== Early season ====
At the 2024 World Aquatics Championships in Doha, Jaouadi finished 25th in the 400 m freestyle at just 18 years old.

He competed in the Mare Nostrum series in Canet-en-Roussillon, winning both the 400 m and 800 m freestyle.

At the French Nationals in Chartres, he won the 400 m, 800 m, and 1500 m freestyle events.

==== 2024 Summer Olympics ====
Having met the Olympic "A" qualifying standards, Jaouadi competed in the 400 m, 800 m, 1500 m freestyle, and the 10 km open water event at the 2024 Summer Olympics.

He placed second in his heat in the 400 m but missed the final, finishing 9th overall.

He won his 800 m heat and qualified second-fastest for the final, where he placed 4th.

In the 1500 m, he qualified for the final with the third-best time and finished 6th, setting a new personal best.

==== 2024 Short Course Worlds ====
He competed at the 12th NVB Autumn Meet in Villefranche-sur-Saône, where he won the 800 m freestyle and set new personal bests in the 100 m freestyle and 200 m butterfly.

At the French Short Course Nationals in Montpellier, he swept the 400 m, 800 m, and 1500 m freestyle events.

At the 2024 World Aquatics Swimming Championships (25 m) in Budapest, he won gold in the 1500 m freestyle, bronze in the 800 m, and placed 7th in the 400 m final. He also broke the African record in the 800 m.

=== 2025 ===
==== Mare Nostrum Swim Tour ====
He won gold in the 400 m and silver in the 800 m at the Barcelona stop, followed by gold (400 m) and bronze (1500 m) at the Canet meet.

==== 2025 World Championships ====
In Singapore, Jaouadi won the 800 m and 1500 m freestyle titles. His 800 m time was the third-fastest in history and the fastest since the ban on polyurethane suits.

He has set personal best times in the 400m freestyle (three minutes, 45.95 seconds), 800m freestyle (7:51.97) and 1500m freestyle (15:10.11) competing at the 2024 Nice meet in France, placing him as the third fastest Tunisian swimmer in history in each event.
