= Luca De Tullio =

Italian swimmer (born 2003)

Personal information
- National team: Italy
- Born: 21 September 2003 (age 22) Bari, Italy

Sport
- Sport: Swimming
- Strokes: Freestyle
- Club: Fiamme Oro
Medal record
Men's swimming
Representing Italy
Event	1st	2nd	3rd
Mediterranean Games	1	0	1
European U23 Championships	0	0	2
European Junior Championships	0	0	1
Total	1	0	4
Mediterranean Games
Gold medal – first place	2026 Taranto	800 m freestyle
Bronze medal – third place	2022 Oran	400 m freestyle

Luca De Tullio (born 21 September 2003) is an Italian competitive swimmer who competed at the 2024 Summer Olympics.

He is the brother of another swimmer Marco De Tullio.
