= Flag of Tunisia =

Republic of Tunisia
- Use: National flag and ensign
- Proportion: 2:3
- Adopted: 20 October 1827; 199 years ago
- Design: A red field with a centered white sun-disc containing a red five-pointed star surrounded by a red crescent
- Designed by: Hussein II
- Presidential Standard
- Use: State flag and ensign
- Design: Standard of the president of Tunisia
- Naval jack
- Use: Naval jack
- Proportion: 1:1

The national flag of Tunisia is a rectangular panel of red color with an aspect ratio of 2:3. In the center of the cloth in a white disk is placed a red crescent, surrounding a red five-pointed star on three sides. The Tunisian Bey Hussein II decided to create a flag for Tunisia, close in appearance to the modern one, after the Battle of Navarino on 20 October 1827; in 1831 he was officially approved. In that form, the flag existed during the French protectorate, and on 1 June 1959, it was proclaimed the state flag of the Republic of Tunisia (in accordance with the Tunisian Constitution). On 30 June 1999, the proportions and design of the flag were clarified by a special law. The general appearance of the flag remained virtually unchanged.

The crescent and the star depicted on the flag of Tunisia are symbols related to the Ottoman Empire and its historic rule of the region.

== History ==
=== Previous flags ===
Until the mid-18th century, the design and significance of maritime flags flying on ships in Tunis are unknown. However, various sources have been able to distinguish certain similarities among the flags: they were designed with a crescent-oriented shape in the presence of the colors blue, green, red, and white. Thereafter, and until the early 19th century, the flag was composed of horizontal blue, red and green stripes, which are the colors of the ruling Husainid dynasty. This kind of flag with multiple bands and irregular contours floated on top of ships all along the coast of North Africa; similar flags with different colors and arrangements were also used in Africa.

According to Ottfried Neubecker, the Bey of Tunis also had his own flag. This flag was most likely a simple personal banner of the ruler, as it floated above the Bardo Palace, the Citadel of Tunis, on navy ships, and also in the center of the coat of arms in Tunisia. It was used at a number of public ceremonies until the abolition of the monarchy and proclamation of Republic on 25 July 1957.

Believed to have been introduced by Hussein II, although some sources, such as Abdel-Wahab, claim that it was in use three centuries earlier, the flag was rectangular in shape and divided into nine stripes, the middle one green and double the size of all other bands, while the others alternated between yellow and red. Featured in the center of the green stripe was the Zulfiqar, the legendary Islamic sword of Ali, with the blade in white and the hilt multicolored. The red and yellow stripes each contained five equidistant symbols, whose order was alternated between each stripe. These symbols were divided into two categories: one red six-sided star voided with a disk of a different color in the center—either a red star and green disk or a white star and blue disk—, and a large disk voided in its lower right by a small disk of different color, with the combination being either a small red disk within a larger blue disk or a small yellow disk within a larger green disk. The first yellow stripe contains three red stars and two blue disks. The second stripe, red in color, contains three green disksand two white stars. The third stripe (second yellow one) is identical to the first, with the exception that the star in its center is white, while the fourth stripe (second white one) is identical to the second stripe.

Flag of the Hafsid dynasty Sultanate (1230–1574)

Variant flag of the Hafsid dynasty Sultanate (15th century)

Flag of the Eyalet of Tunis (1574–1705)

Flag of the Husainid dynasty (1705–1827)

Flag of the Beylik of Tunis (1827–1881) and Tunisia (1881–1959)

=== Origin of the current flag ===
The naval ensign of the Tunisian navy from the 1830s, and national flag of Tunisia from 1959 to 1999, with a slightly thinner crescent than in the current design

Several Muslim countries along the south coast of the Mediterranean Sea used a plain red naval flag. After the destruction of the Tunisian naval division at the Battle of Navarino on 20 October 1827, the sovereign Husainid Dynasty leader Hussein II decided to create a flag to use for the fleet of Tunisia, to distinguish it from other fleets. There are some discrepancies over the date of the flag's adoption, as the government states that it was adopted in 1831, while other sources like Siobhan Ryan's Ultimate Pocket Flags of the World claim that it was adopted in 1835.

=== French protectorate ===
The Tunisian flag was not changed during its time as a French protectorate. However, according to an article in the Flag Bulletin publishing in Fall 2000, for a short period of time during the French protectorate, the flag of France was placed in the canton (upper left) of the Tunisian flag. In the same vein, vexillologist Whitney Smith stated that the addition of the French flag was "modification of the unofficial Tunisian national flag, used for a few years". He added:

Tunisia, a French protectorate, retained its national flag on land and at sea. Nevertheless, in the late 19th Century or early 20th Century an unofficial version of the flag was used with the tricolor canton. In 1925 a formal proposal was made to adopt that flag as official, but no action was taken. That flag, featured on the cover of this issue [of the Flag Bulletin], does not appear to have been illustrated in any vexillological source.

Confusion arose when an issue of the French daily newspaper Le Petit Journal, published on 24 July 1904 on the occasion of the bey of Tunis's visit to France, reproduced an illustration showing the flag used while he was visiting the Hôtel de Ville, Paris. Ivan Sache of Flags of the World claimed that this flag design, which had not been seen earlier, may have been inaccurate, suggesting that the journalist might not have been at the affair or he had reproduced a drawing of the wrong flag.

== Description ==
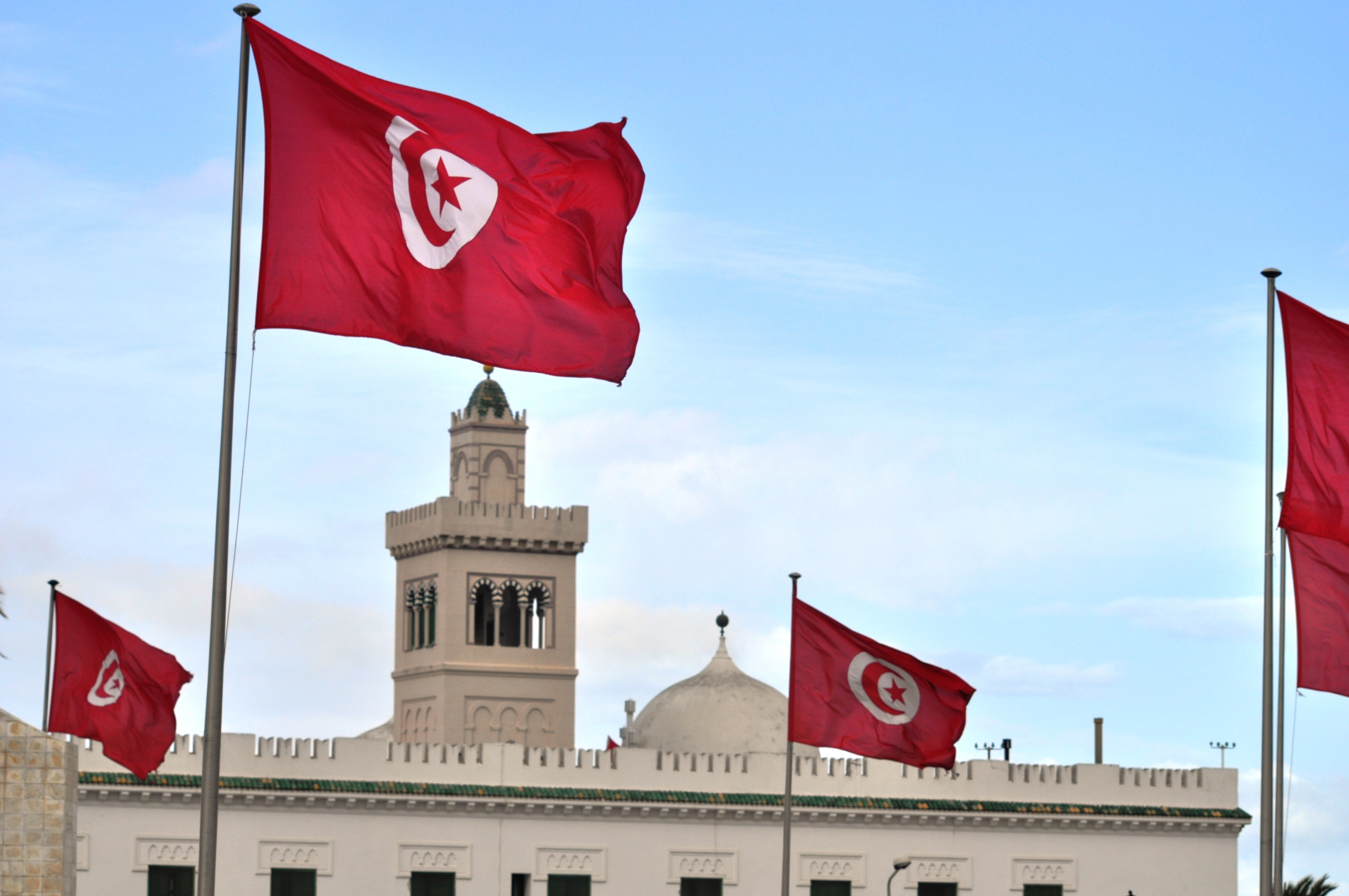
Tunisia flags in Sadiki College

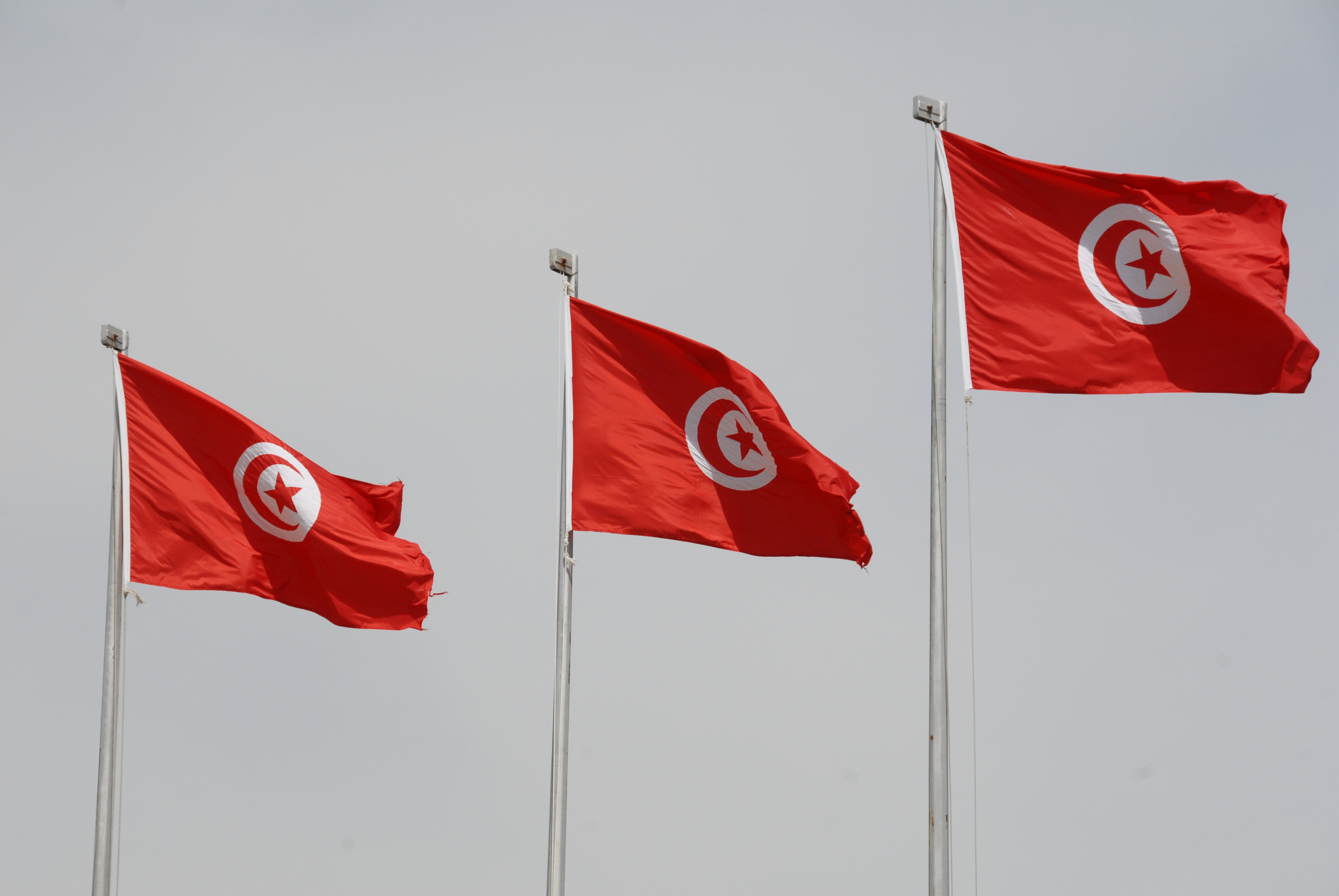
Series of Tunisia flags

The Tunisian flag was defined in Article 4 of the 1 June 1959 constitution under these terms: "The flag of the Republic of Tunisia is red, it has, under the conditions defined by law, in the middle, a white disk containing a five-pointed star surrounded by a red crescent."

The Organic Law No. 99-56 of 30 June 1999, adopted on 3 July by the Chamber of Deputies, formalized the Tunisian flag for the first time in law, clarifying Article 4 of the constitution. The flag is in the form of a red rectangle with a width equal to two-thirds of its length. In the middle of the flag is a white disk whose diameter is equal to one-third of the length of the rectangle and whose center is located at the intersection of the diagonals of the rectangle. A red five-pointed star is located to the right of the disk, whose center is at a distance equal to one-thirtieth of the length of the flag from the center of the disk.

The location of the star's five points is determined by an imaginary disk centered on the star's center, its diameter equal to roughly 15% the length of the flag. The points of the star are equidistant from each other, and one of the points is located on the horizontal median of the flag to the left of the center of the imaginary disk. The star is surrounded on its left by a red crescent made by the intersection of two arcs, an outer arc whose diameter is equal to one-fourth of the length of the flag, and an internal arc with a diameter equal to one-fifth of the flag's length. In addition, at the top of the flag used by the President of the Republic, the words "for the nation" (Arabic: لِلوَطَن) are written in gold. The three outer edges of the flag are lined with golden yellow fringe and a red ribbon, with golden fringe on the right vertical side and a white disk with a star and crescent near the fringe, is attached to the flag pole above the flag.

Article 4 of the 1959 constitution specifies the presence of a technical dossier containing a model of the flag, a guide to drawing it, which includes the proper measurements, and technical specifications of its colors.

Construction diagram of the flag according to the 1999 law

=== Colours scheme ===
/	Red	White
RGB	231-0-19	255-255-255
Hexadecimal	#e70013	#FFFFFF
CMYK	0, 100, 92, 9	0, 0, 0, 0

== Symbolism ==
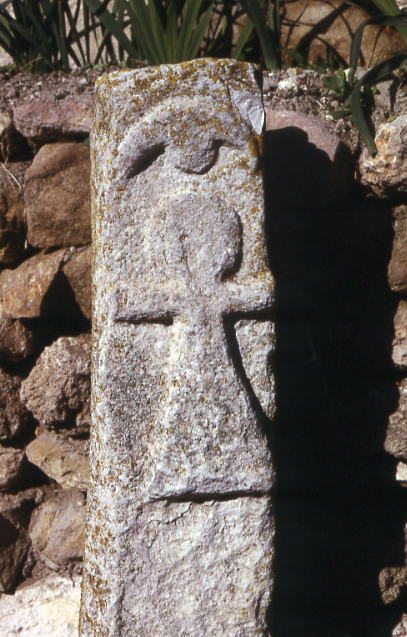
Presence of the crescent in Tunisia since the existence of Carthage

For the Tunisian embassy in France, the color red represents the blood of Tunisian martyrs killed during the Crusades before the advent of the Ottomans in 1574. Another interpretation is that the "red Beylical flag spread light throughout the Muslim world". The white symbolizes peace, the disk symbolizes the radiance of the nation as the sun, while the crescent and five-pointed star represent unity of all Muslims and the Five Pillars of Islam, respectively.

According to Ludvík Mucha, author of Webster's Concise Encyclopedia of Flags & Coats of Arms, the white disk located in the center of the flag represents the sun. The red crescent and the five-pointed star, two ancient symbols of Islam, have appeared on many flags of Islamic countries. The crescent is, from the viewpoint of an Arabic observer, supposed to bring good luck. The color red represents the blood of martyrs.

Whitney Smith states that the crescent was first emblazoned on standards and buildings in the Punic state of Carthage, located in present-day Tunisia. Nevertheless, they were widely adopted by Muslim countries, and have become known as symbols of Islam, when in fact, they may be cultural symbols. Likewise, the sun is often represented with the crescent on ancient Punic artifacts and is associated with the ancient Punic religion, especially with the Sign of Tanit.

== Protocol ==
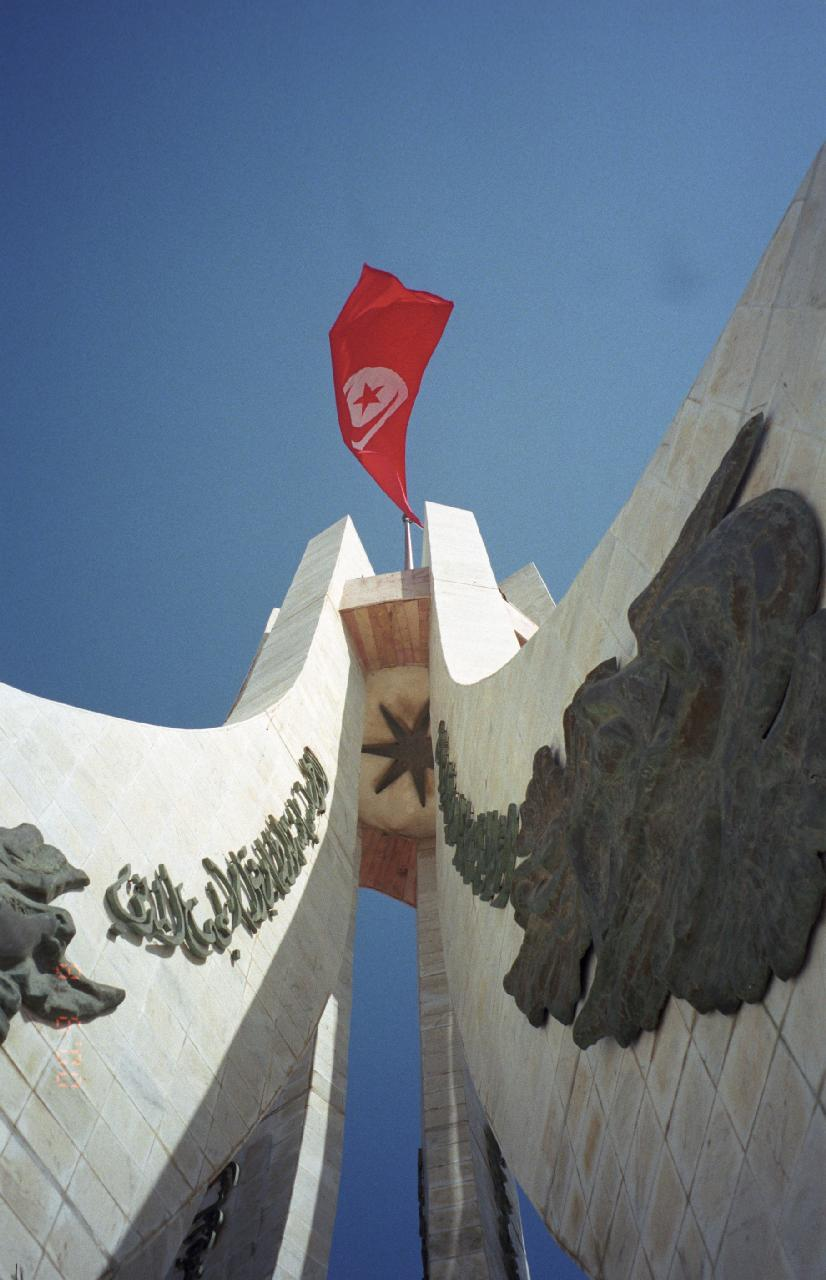
Flag hoisted on the National Monument of the Kasbah in Tunis

Roundel on Tunisian military equipment

The Tunisian flag is visible on all public and military buildings. The flag also betokens Tunisian ambassadors at regional and international meetings as well as at buildings housing Tunisian representatives around the world. It is deployed during commemorations and national honors in a strictly ceremonial manner. On the listed Flag Days below, the Tunisian flag is flown in public buildings, compulsory by law:

Date	Name	Notes
17 December	Revolution Day	Beginning of tensions between French authorities and Bourguiba-led nationalists (1952)
20 March	Independence Day	Declaration of independence (1956); also known as Remembrance Day
21 March	Youth Day	
9 April	Martyr's Day	Suppression of nationalist demonstrations by French troops (1938)
1 June	Victory Day	Adoption of Constitution of Tunisia (1959)
25 July	Republic Day	Proclamation of the republic (1957)
15 October	Evacuation Day	Evacuation of the last French military base in Tunisia (1963)

Article 129 of the Penal Code of Tunisia punishes the insult either "publicly, by words, writings, gestures or any other manner" of the Tunisian flag and also foreign flags with one year imprisonment.

== Variants ==
The colors of the flag are included in other Tunisian symbols, such as the coat of arms, which contains a crescent and star enclosed in a disk with red border. In addition, equipment belonging to the Tunisian army are visually recognized by the presence of a cockade.

Most political parties of Tunisia reflect the colors of the flag or the flag itself. Many postal stamps reflect the motifs of the flag, which radiate "with brightness" on them.

== Tunisian flag disambiguation from Tunisian red crescent ==
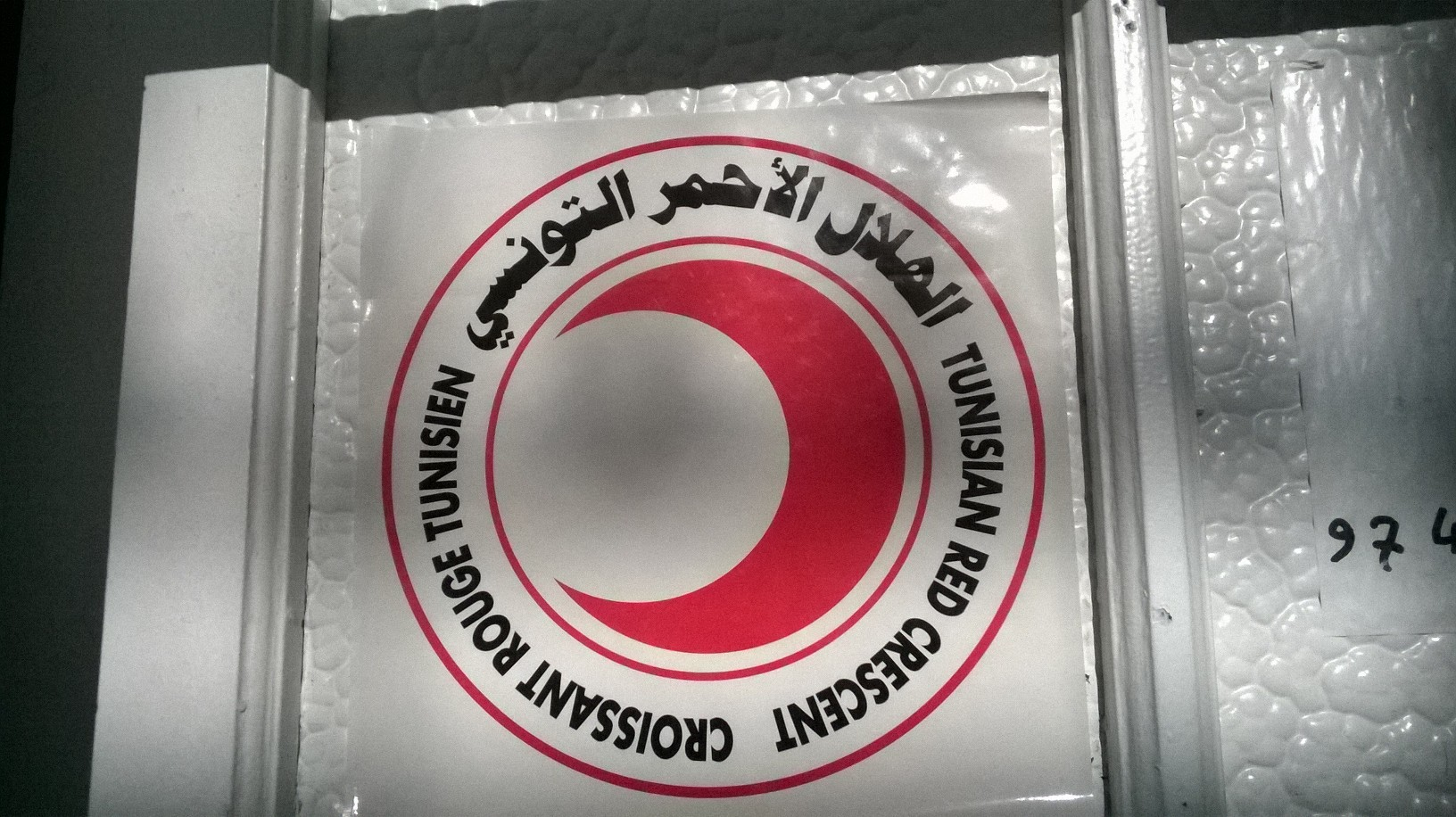
Tunisian Red Crescent logo, facing left for clear distinction from military roundel

The International Red Cross and Red Crescent movement offers three main symbols (a cross, a crescent or a crystal shape) to national committees. Though neither emblem has any religious association, most majority Muslim population countries chose a red crescent facing to the right, to avoid perceived religious connotations of the red cross. However, in Tunisia, such a symbol could be difficult to distinguish from the roundel on Tunisian military equipment. Therefore, to clearly distinguish on a battlefield the neutrality of ambulances and other equipment and personnel belonging to the red crescent from the military ones, the Tunisian Red Crescent Society is the only one in the world to have adopted as logo a crescent facing to the left.

== See also ==
- List of Tunisian flags
- Flag of Turkey

== Bibliography ==
- Hugon, Henri (1913). Les Emblèmes des beys de Tunis: Etude sur les Signes de l'autonomie Husseinite (in French). Paris: Leroux. p. 64. OCLC 962103.
- Lux-Wurm, Pierre C.; Zaragoza, Martha (2001). Les drapeaux de l'islam: de Mahomet à nos jours (in French). Paris: Buchet-Chastel. ISBN 2-283-01813-7. OCLC 48449213.
