= Swimming at the 2018 European Aquatics Championships – Men's 800 metre freestyle =

Men's 800 metre freestyle at the 2018 European Aquatics Championships
- Venue: Tollcross International Swimming Centre
- Dates: 7 August (heats); 8 August (final)
- Competitors: 26 from 20 nations
- Winning time: 7:42.96

Medalists
gold medal	Mykhailo Romanchuk	Ukraine
silver medal	Gregorio Paltrinieri	Italy
bronze medal	Florian Wellbrock	Germany

The Men's 800 metre freestyle competition of the 2018 European Aquatics Championships was held on 7 and 8 August 2018.

== Records ==
Before the competition, the existing world and championship records were as follows.

	Name	Nation	Time	Location	Date
World record	Zhang Lin	China	7:32.12	Rome	29 July 2009
European record	Gabriele Detti	Italy	7:40.77	Budapest	26 July 2017
Championship record	Gregorio Paltrinieri	Italy	7:42.33	London	20 May 2016

== Results ==
=== Heats ===
The heats were started on 7 August at 10:18.

Rank	Heat	Lane	Name	Nationality	Time	Notes
1	2	5	Mykhailo Romanchuk	Ukraine	7:49.96	Q
2	2	4	Gregorio Paltrinieri	Italy	7:50.08	Q
3	1	4	Marin Mogić	Croatia	7:51.78	Q
4	2	2	Jan Micka	Czech Republic	7:52.14	Q
5	2	7	Damien Joly	France	7:52.54	Q
6	2	1	Domenico Acerenza	Italy	7:52.80	Q
7	3	3	Florian Wellbrock	Germany	7:53.62	Q
8	3	5	Henrik Christiansen	Norway	7:53.94	Q
9	3	2	Serhiy Frolov	Ukraine	7:54.31	
9	3	6	Victor Johansson	Sweden	7:54.31	
11	3	1	Anton Ipsen	Denmark	7:54.34	
12	2	3	Felix Auböck	Austria	7:55.56	
13	1	6	Vuk Čelić	Serbia	7:56.58	
14	3	4	Wojciech Wojdak	Poland	7:56.83	
15	2	8	Ilya Druzhinin	Russia	7:57.54	
16	1	5	Tom Derbyshire	Great Britain	7:58.26	
17	3	0	Jay Lelliott	Great Britain	7:58.67	
18	3	7	Henning Mühlleitner	Germany	7:58.77	
19	1	3	Albert Escrits	Spain	8:01.39	
20	3	8	Poul Zellmann	Germany	8:03.07	
21	1	2	Bogdan-Andrei Scarlat	Romania	8:03.98	
22	2	0	Filip Zaborowski	Poland	8:06.48	
23	2	9	Dávid Lakatos	Hungary	8:07.51	
24	1	1	Guilherme Pina	Portugal	8:07.96	
25	1	7	Andreas Georgakopoulos	Greece	8:25.42	
26	1	0	Frenc Berdaku	Albania	8:44.70	
—	1	8	Maksym Shemberev	Azerbaijan	Did not start	
—	1	9	Spiro Goga	Albania	Did not start	
—	2	6	David Aubry	France	Did not start	

=== Final ===
The final was started on 8 August at 16:30.

Rank	Lane	Name	Nationality	Time	Notes
1st place, gold medalist(s)	4	Mykhailo Romanchuk	Ukraine	7:42.96	
2nd place, silver medalist(s)	5	Gregorio Paltrinieri	Italy	7:45.12	
3rd place, bronze medalist(s)	1	Florian Wellbrock	Germany	7:45.60	
4	8	Henrik Christiansen	Norway	7:46.75	
5	6	Jan Micka	Czech Republic	7:49.73	
6	7	Domenico Acerenza	Italy	7:51.64	
7	2	Damien Joly	France	7:56.75	
8	3	Marin Mogić	Croatia	7:58.03	
