= Swimming at the 2018 European Aquatics Championships – Men's 1500 metre freestyle =

Men's 1500 metre freestyle at the 2018 European Aquatics Championships
- Venue: Tollcross International Swimming Centre
- Dates: 4 August (heats); 5 August (final)
- Competitors: 20 from 16 nations
- Winning time: 14:36.15

Medalists
gold medal	Florian Wellbrock	Germany
silver medal	Mykhailo Romanchuk	Ukraine
bronze medal	Gregorio Paltrinieri	Italy

The Men's 1500 metre freestyle competition of the 2018 European Aquatics Championships was held on 4 and 5 August 2018.

== Records ==
Before the competition, the existing world and championship records were as follows.

	Name	Nation	Time	Location	Date
World record	Sun Yang	China	14:31.02	London	4 August 2012
European record Championship record	Gregorio Paltrinieri	Italy	14:34.04	London	18 May 2016

== Results ==
=== Heats ===
The heats were started on 4 August at 10:49.

Rank	Heat	Lane	Name	Nationality	Time	Notes
1	2	6	Damien Joly	France	14:53.52	Q
2	1	4	Mykhailo Romanchuk	Ukraine	14:53.79	Q
3	2	5	Florian Wellbrock	Germany	14:54.55	Q
4	2	4	Gregorio Paltrinieri	Italy	14:54.85	Q
5	1	5	Henrik Christiansen	Norway	14:58.03	Q
6	1	6	Jan Micka	Czech Republic	14:58.94	Q
7	1	3	Domenico Acerenza	Italy	14:59.35	Q
8	2	3	Serhiy Frolov	Ukraine	15:02.93	Q
9	2	8	Marin Mogić	Croatia	15:04.45	
10	1	1	Anton Ipsen	Denmark	15:05.86	
11	1	7	Ilya Druzhinin	Russia	15:06.43	
12	2	9	Tom Derbyshire	United Kingdom	15:11.45	
13	2	0	Vuk Čelić	Serbia	15:11.52	
14	1	2	David Aubry	France	15:15.61	
15	2	1	Victor Johansson	Sweden	15:15.75	
16	2	2	Gergely Gyurta	Hungary	15:28.70	
17	1	8	Dávid Lakatos	Hungary	15:33.96	
18	1	0	Guilherme Pina	Portugal	15:39.89	
19	2	7	Andreas Georgakopoulos	Greece	16:01.83	
20	1	9	Franc Aleksi	Albania	16:29.27	

=== Final ===
The final was held on 5 August at 17:00.

Rank	Lane	Name	Nationality	Time	Notes
1st place, gold medalist(s)	3	Florian Wellbrock	Germany	14:36.15	
2nd place, silver medalist(s)	5	Mykhailo Romanchuk	Ukraine	14:36.88	
3rd place, bronze medalist(s)	6	Gregorio Paltrinieri	Italy	14:42.85	
4	1	Domenico Acerenza	Italy	14:51.88	
5	2	Henrik Christiansen	Norway	14:56.47	
6	4	Damien Joly	France	14:57.82	
7	8	Serhiy Frolov	Ukraine	14:58.46	
8	7	Jan Micka	Czech Republic	14:59.49	
