= Swimming at the 2020 European Aquatics Championships – Men's 800 metre freestyle =

Swimming competition

Men's 800 metre freestyle at the 2020 European Aquatics Championships
- Venue: Danube Arena
- Dates: 21 May 2021 (heats); 22 May 2021 (final)
- Competitors: 41 from 22 nations
- Winning time: 7:42.61

Medalists
gold medal	Mykhailo Romanchuk	Ukraine
silver medal	Gregorio Paltrinieri	Italy
bronze medal	Gabriele Detti	Italy

The Men's 800 metre freestyle competition of the 2020 European Aquatics Championships was held on 21 and 22 May 2021.

== Records ==
Before the competition, the existing world, European and championship records were as follows.

	Name	Nationality	Time	Location	Date
World record	Zhang Lin	China	7:32.12	Rome	29 July 2009
European record	Gregorio Paltrinieri	Italy	7:39.27	Gwangju	24 July 2019
Championship record	Gregorio Paltrinieri	Italy	7:42.33	London	20 May 2016

== Results ==
=== Heats ===
The heats were started on 21 May at 11:28.

Rank	Heat	Lane	Name	Nationality	Time	Notes
1	4	5	Mykhailo Romanchuk	Ukraine	7:48.31	Q
2	4	4	Henrik Christiansen	Norway	7:50.11	Q
3	5	3	Gabriele Detti	Italy	7:50.61	Q
4	5	4	Gregorio Paltrinieri	Italy	7:51.33	Q
5	5	6	Sergiy Frolov	Ukraine	7:51.73	Q
6	5	2	Anton Ipsen	Denmark	7:52.37	Q
7	2	1	José Paulo Lopes	Portugal	7:52.81	Q, NR
8	3	5	Joris Bouchaut	France	7:53.07	Q
9	4	6	Aleksandr Egorov	Russia	7:53.32	
10	4	7	Damien Joly	France	7:54.23	
11	4	9	Daniel Wiffen	Ireland	7:55.02	
12	2	3	Victor Johansson	Sweden	7:55.34	
13	3	7	Yiğit Aslan	Turkey	7:55.99	
14	3	3	Kristóf Rasovszky	Hungary	7:56.27	
15	4	0	Ákos Kalmár	Hungary	7:56.56	
16	5	9	Alexander Nørgaard	Denmark	7:57.24	
17	5	7	Daniel Jervis	Great Britain	7:57.39	
18	2	6	Dimitrios Markos	Greece	8:00.32	
19	5	8	Marco De Tullio	Italy	8:01.33	
20	2	7	Arthur Dalén Ellegaard	Denmark	8:02.69	
21	5	0	Ilya Druzhinin	Russia	8:03.01	
22	3	0	Gergely Gyurta	Hungary	8:03.83	
23	3	2	Dimitrios Negris	Greece	8:05.07	
24	2	9	Jon Jøntvedt	Norway	8:06.90	
25	2	8	Alejandro Puebla	Spain	8:07.28	
26	4	2	Jan Micka	Czech Republic	8:07.60	
27	2	2	Ilya Borodin	Russia	8:07.88	
28	4	1	Kieran Bird	Great Britain	8:08.36	
29	3	4	Vuk Čelić	Serbia	8:09.65	
30	2	0	Márk Kovacsics	Hungary	8:09.98	
31	2	5	Oskar Lindholm	Denmark	8:10.20	
32	3	1	Martin Bau	Slovenia	8:10.30	
33	2	4	Bar Soloveychik	Israel	8:13.62	
34	3	9	Miguel Durán	Spain	8:14.02	
35	5	5	David Aubry	France	8:14.25	
36	3	6	Mert Kılavuz	Turkey	8:15.92	
37	3	8	Marin Mogić	Croatia	8:22.50	
38	1	5	Loris Bianchi	San Marino	8:24.30	NR
39	1	4	Arti Krasniqi	Kosovo	8:25.68	
40	4	8	Konstantinos Englezakis	Greece	8:27.61	
41	1	3	Théo Druenne	Monaco	8:46.10	
	4	3	Franko Grgić	Croatia	Did not start	
	5	1	Marc-Antoine Olivier	France	Did not start	

=== Final ===
The final was held on 22 May 2021 at 18:00.

Rank	Lane	Name	Nationality	Time	Notes
1st place, gold medalist(s)	4	Mykhailo Romanchuk	Ukraine	7:42.61	
2nd place, silver medalist(s)	6	Gregorio Paltrinieri	Italy	7:43.62	
3rd place, bronze medalist(s)	3	Gabriele Detti	Italy	7:46.10	
4	5	Henrik Christiansen	Norway	7:47.99	
5	7	Anton Ipsen	Denmark	7:52.07	
6	1	José Paulo Lopes	Portugal	7:52.68	NR
7	8	Joris Bouchaut	France	7:52.85	
8	2	Sergiy Frolov	Ukraine	7:56.12	
