= Swimming at the 2019 World Aquatics Championships – Men's 1500 metre freestyle =

Men's 1500 metre freestyle at the 2019 World Aquatics Championships
- Venue: Nambu University Municipal Aquatics Center
- Location: Gwangju, South Korea
- Dates: 27 July (heats); 28 July (final)
- Competitors: 35 from 28 nations
- Winning time: 14:36.54

Medalists
gold medal	Florian Wellbrock	Germany
silver medal	Mykhailo Romanchuk	Ukraine
bronze medal	Gregorio Paltrinieri	Italy

The Men's 1500 metre freestyle competition at the 2019 World Championships was held on 27 and 28 July 2019.

== Records ==
Prior to the competition, the existing world and championship records were as follows.

World record	Sun Yang (CHN)	14:31.02	London, United Kingdom	4 August 2012
Competition record	Sun Yang (CHN)	14:34.14	Shanghai, China	31 July 2011

== Results ==
=== Heats ===
The heats were started on 27 July at 11:17.

Rank	Heat	Lane	Name	Nationality	Time	Notes
1	4	5	Gregorio Paltrinieri	Italy	14:45.80	Q
2	4	4	Florian Wellbrock	Germany	14:47.52	Q
3	3	4	Mykhailo Romanchuk	Ukraine	14:47.54	Q
4	4	1	Alexander Norgaard	Denmark	14:47.75	Q, NR
5	4	2	Henrik Christiansen	Norway	14:50.28	Q
6	3	2	Domenico Acerenza	Italy	14:52.03	Q
7	3	7	David Aubry	France	14:53.38	Q
8	3	1	Serhiy Frolov	Ukraine	14:55.06	Q
9	4	7	Damien Joly	France	14:55.51	
10	3	6	Jan Micka	Czech Republic	14:59.05	
11	4	3	Jordan Wilimovsky	United States	14:59.94	
12	2	4	Ákos Kalmár	Hungary	15:00.99	
13	3	5	Daniel Jervis	Great Britain	15:01.50	
14	3	9	Nguyễn Huy Hoàng	Vietnam	15:02.35	
15	4	8	Anton Ipsen	Denmark	15:04.02	
16	3	3	Jack McLoughlin	Australia	15:04.64	
17	3	8	Ruwen Straub	Germany	15:05.51	
18	4	0	Ilya Druzhinin	Russia	15:07.93	
19	2	9	Ahmed Akram	Egypt	15:13.25	
20	2	3	Gergely Gyurta	Hungary	15:14.20	
21	2	5	Ji Xinjie	China	15:15.41	
22	2	6	Diogo Villarinho	Brazil	15:15.91	
23	4	9	Wojciech Wojdak	Poland	15:16.14	
24	2	7	Vuk Čelić	Serbia	15:17.79	
25	3	0	Guilherme Costa	Brazil	15:20.73	
26	4	6	Zane Grothe	United States	15:21.43	
27	2	2	Dimitrios Negris	Greece	15:25.71	
28	2	0	Kim Woo-min	South Korea	15:26.17	
29	2	8	Huang Guo-ting	Chinese Taipei	15:33.53	
30	2	1	Aflah Prawira	Indonesia	15:38.34	
31	1	5	Joaquín Moreno	Argentina	15:48.98	
32	1	3	Aryan Nehra	India	15:59.47	
33	1	6	Cheuk Ming Ho	Hong Kong	16:03.96	
34	1	4	Oli Mortensen	Faroe Islands	16:17.71	
35	1	2	Adib Khalil	Lebanon	16:19.51	

=== Final ===
The final was held on 28 July at 20:17.

Rank	Lane	Name	Nationality	Time	Notes
1st place, gold medalist(s)	5	Florian Wellbrock	Germany	14:36.54	
2nd place, silver medalist(s)	3	Mykhailo Romanchuk	Ukraine	14:37.63	
3rd place, bronze medalist(s)	4	Gregorio Paltrinieri	Italy	14:38.75	
4	1	David Aubry	France	14:44.72	NR
5	2	Henrik Christiansen	Norway	14:45.35	NR
6	7	Domenico Acerenza	Italy	14:52.05	
7	8	Serhiy Frolov	Ukraine	15:01.04	
8	6	Alexander Norgaard	Denmark	15:20.47	
