= Swimming at the 2020 European Aquatics Championships – Men's 1500 metre freestyle =

Men's 1500 metre freestyle at the 2020 European Aquatics Championships
- Venue: Danube Arena
- Dates: 18 May 2021 (heats); 19 May 2021 (final)
- Competitors: 24 from 16 nations
- Winning time: 14:39.89

Medalists
gold medal	Mykhailo Romanchuk	Ukraine
silver medal	Gregorio Paltrinieri	Italy
bronze medal	Domenico Acerenza	Italy

The Men's 1500 metre freestyle competition of the 2020 European Aquatics Championships was held on 18 and 19 May 2021.

== Records ==
Before the competition, the existing world, European and championship records were as follows.

	Name	Nationality	Time	Location	Date
World record	Sun Yang	China	14:31.02	London	28 July 2012
European record	Gregorio Paltrinieri	Italy	14:33.10	Rome	13 August 2020
Championship record	Gregorio Paltrinieri	Italy	14:34.04	London	18 May 2016

== Results ==
=== Heats ===
The heats were started on 18 May at 11:21.

Rank	Heat	Lane	Name	Nationality	Time	Notes
1	2	4	Mykhailo Romanchuk	Ukraine	14:52.07	Q
2	2	7	Damien Joly	France	14:56.09	Q
3	2	6	Domenico Acerenza	Italy	14:59.47	Q
4	3	2	Ákos Kalmár	Hungary	15:02.97	Q
5	3	3	Daniel Jervis	Great Britain	15:07.54	Q
6	2	5	Henrik Christiansen	Norway	15:08.28	Q
7	3	4	Gregorio Paltrinieri	Italy	15:08.84	Q
8	3	1	Aleksandr Egorov	Russia	15:09.95	Q
9	2	2	Serhiy Frolov	Ukraine	15:10.41	
10	3	9	Yiğit Aslan	Turkey	15:14.80	
11	2	1	Ilya Druzhinin	Russia	15:16.47	
12	2	0	Dávid Betlehem	Hungary	15:18.18	
13	3	8	Gergely Gyurta	Hungary	15:18.85	
14	3	6	Jan Micka	Czech Republic	15:28.10	
15	3	7	Marc-Antoine Olivier	France	15:30.04	
16	2	9	Alejandro Puebla	Spain	15:30.35	
17	1	4	Márk Kovacsics	Hungary	15:35.95	
18	3	5	David Aubry	France	15:36.51	
19	3	0	Vuk Čelić	Serbia	15:37.16	
20	2	3	Alexander Asla Nørgaard	Denmark	15:39.39	
21	1	5	Bar Soloveychik	Israel	15:40.53	
22	2	8	Dimitrios Negris	Greece	15:46.78	
23	1	3	Loris Bianchi	San Marino	16:14.61	
24	1	6	Théo Druenne	Monaco	16:37.80	

=== Final ===
The final was held on 19 May at 18:00.

Rank	Lane	Name	Nationality	Time	Notes
1st place, gold medalist(s)	4	Mykhailo Romanchuk	Ukraine	14:39.89	
2nd place, silver medalist(s)	1	Gregorio Paltrinieri	Italy	14:42.91	
3rd place, bronze medalist(s)	3	Domenico Acerenza	Italy	14:54.36	
4	5	Damien Joly	France	14:56.38	
5	2	Daniel Jervis	Great Britain	14:58.42	
6	6	Ákos Kalmár	Hungary	15:04.61	
7	7	Henrik Christiansen	Norway	15:05.19	
8	8	Aleksandr Egorov	Russia	15:10.43	
