= Swimming at the 2017 World Aquatics Championships – Men's 1500 metre freestyle =

Men's 1500 metre freestyle at the 2017 World Aquatics Championships
- Venue: Danube Arena
- Location: Budapest, Hungary
- Dates: 29 July (heats); 30 July (final)
- Competitors: 37 from 32 nations
- Winning time: 14:35.85

Medalists
gold medal	Gregorio Paltrinieri	Italy
silver medal	Mykhailo Romanchuk	Ukraine
bronze medal	Mack Horton	Australia

Men's 1500M Freestyle Final

The Men's 1500 metre freestyle competition at the 2017 World Championships was held on 29 and 30 July 2017.

== Records ==
Prior to the competition, the existing world and championship records were as follows.

World record	Sun Yang (CHN)	14:31.02	London, Great Britain	4 August 2012
Competition record	Sun Yang (CHN)	14:34.14	Shanghai, China	31 July 2011

== Results ==
=== Heats ===
The heats were held on 29 July at 10:44.

Rank	Heat	Lane	Name	Nationality	Time	Notes
1	4	3	Mykhailo Romanchuk	Ukraine	14:44.11	Q, NR
2	4	4	Gregorio Paltrinieri	Italy	14:44.31	Q
3	4	5	Gabriele Detti	Italy	14:50.10	Q
4	4	7	Jan Micka	Czech Republic	14:55.47	Q
5	3	6	Wojciech Wojdak	Poland	14:57.39	Q
6	4	6	Henrik Christiansen	Norway	14:57.41	Q
7	3	4	Mack Horton	Australia	14:59.24	Q
8	4	0	Serhiy Frolov	Ukraine	14:59.32	Q
9	2	4	Park Tae-hwan	South Korea	14:59.44	
10	3	2	Ahmed Akram	Egypt	14:59.56	
11	3	5	Jack McLoughlin	Australia	15:01.55	
12	3	1	Felix Auböck	Austria	15:02.78	
13	3	7	Ilya Druzhinin	Russia	15:03.05	
14	2	3	Marcelo Acosta	El Salvador	15:04.79	
15	2	0	Victor Johansson	Sweden	15:05.91	NR
16	4	1	True Sweetser	United States	15:07.38	
17	4	2	Florian Wellbrock	Germany	15:07.43	
18	3	3	Daniel Jervis	Great Britain	15:07.97	
19	3	9	Guilherme Costa	Brazil	15:08.09	
20	4	9	Anton Ipsen	Denmark	15:10.02	
21	4	8	Robert Finke	United States	15:15.15	
22	3	0	Antonio Arroyo	Spain	15:18.50	
23	2	2	Brent Szurdoki	South Africa	15:18.84	
24	2	7	Kristóf Rasovszky	Hungary	15:23.87	
25	2	5	Ji Xinjie	China	15:23.91	
26	2	6	Ákos Kalmár	Hungary	15:23.96	
27	2	1	Ricardo Vargas	Mexico	15:24.79	
28	2	8	Guilherme Pina	Portugal	15:26.10	
29	2	9	Bogdan Scarlat	Romania	15:26.18	
30	1	9	Nguyễn Hữu Kim Sơn	Vietnam	15:29.90	NR
31	1	3	Huang Guo-ting	Chinese Taipei	15:31.10	
32	1	2	Aflah Fadlan Prawira	Indonesia	15:31.27	NR
33	1	5	Dimitrios Negris	Greece	15:35.55	
34	1	1	Óli Mortensen	Faroe Islands	15:37.77	
35	1	7	Christian Bayo	Puerto Rico	15:52.78	
36	1	6	Wesley Roberts	Cook Islands	16:15.04	
37	1	0	Franci Aleksi	Albania	16:42.97	
	1	4	Martín Naidich	Argentina	DNS	
	1	8	Felipe Tapia	Chile	DNS	
	3	8	Sun Yang	China	DNS	

=== Final ===
The final was held on 30 July at 18:38.

Rank	Lane	Name	Nationality	Time	Notes
1st place, gold medalist(s)	5	Gregorio Paltrinieri	Italy	14:35.85	
2nd place, silver medalist(s)	4	Mykhailo Romanchuk	Ukraine	14:37.14	NR
3rd place, bronze medalist(s)	1	Mack Horton	Australia	14:47.70	
4	3	Gabriele Detti	Italy	14:52.07	
5	7	Henrik Christiansen	Norway	14:54.58	
6	8	Serhiy Frolov	Ukraine	14:55.10	
7	2	Wojciech Wojdak	Poland	15:01.27	
8	6	Jan Micka	Czech Republic	15:09.28	
