= Swimming at the 2016 European Aquatics Championships – Men's 800 metre freestyle =

Men's 800 metre freestyle at the 2016 European Aquatics Championships
- Dates: 19–20 May
- Competitors: 30 from 20 nations
- Winning time: 7:42.33

Medalists
gold medal	Gregorio Paltrinieri	Italy
silver medal	Gabriele Detti	Italy
bronze medal	Mykhailo Romanchuk	Ukraine

The Men's 800 metre freestyle competition of the 2016 European Aquatics Championships was held on 19 and 20 May 2016.

== Records ==
Prior to the competition, the existing world, European and championship records were as follows.

	Name	Nation	Time	Location	Date
World record	Zhang Lin	China	7:32.12	Rome	29 July 2009
European record	Gregorio Paltrinieri	Italy	7:40.81	Kazan	5 August 2015
Championship record	Gregorio Paltrinieri	Italy	7:44.98	Berlin	22 August 2014

== Results ==
=== Heats ===
The heats were held on 19 May at 10:53.

Rank	Heat	Lane	Name	Nationality	Time	Notes
1	4	4	Gregorio Paltrinieri	Italy	7:49.87	Q
2	4	5	Gabriele Detti	Italy	7:51.40	Q
3	3	6	Mykhailo Romanchuk	Ukraine	7:51.83	Q
4	1	5	Timothy Shuttleworth	Great Britain	7:52.33	Q
5	3	2	Jan Micka	Czech Republic	7:52.76	Q
6	3	4	Henrik Christiansen	Norway	7:53.09	Q
7	3	3	Joris Bouchaut	France	7:54.41	Q
8	4	3	Gergely Gyurta	Hungary	7:56.50	Q
9	4	2	Ruwen Straub	Germany	7:57.05	
10	4	1	Filip Zaborowski	Poland	7:57.62	
11	4	7	Daniel Jervis	Great Britain	7:58.45	
12	3	5	Serhiy Frolov	Ukraine	7:58.54	
13	4	6	Richárd Nagy	Slovakia	7:58.93	
14	2	4	Nezir Karap	Turkey	7:59.20	
15	4	8	Miguel Durán	Spain	8:01.12	
16	2	5	Victor Johansson	Sweden	8:01.63	
17	2	6	Marc Hinawi	Israel	8:01.70	
18	3	8	Kristóf Rasovszky	Hungary	8:01.82	
19	3	9	Martin Bau	Slovenia	8:03.35	
20	3	1	Anton Ipsen	Denmark	8:03.37	
21	3	7	Antonio Arroyo	Spain	8:04.40	
22	4	9	Henning Muehlleitner	Germany	8:12.21	
23	2	3	Grega Popović	Slovenia	8:14.56	
24	4	0	Vuk Čelić	Serbia	8:14.86	
25	2	1	Ján Kútnik	Czech Republic	8:16.47	
26	2	7	Truls Wigdel	Norway	8:17.80	
27	3	0	Ediz Yıldırımer	Turkey	8:17.99	
28	2	8	Dimitrios Dimitriou	Greece	8:29.63	
29	1	4	Irakli Revishvili	Georgia	8:33.31	
30	1	3	Franc Aleksi	Albania	8:35.94	
	2	2	Oli Mortensen	Faroe Islands	DNS	

=== Final ===
The final was held on 20 May at 18:02.

Rank	Lane	Name	Nationality	Time	Notes
1st place, gold medalist(s)	4	Gregorio Paltrinieri	Italy	7:42.33	CR
2nd place, silver medalist(s)	5	Gabriele Detti	Italy	7:43.52	
3rd place, bronze medalist(s)	3	Mykhailo Romanchuk	Ukraine	7:47.99	
4	2	Jan Micka	Czech Republic	7:50.38	
5	6	Timothy Shuttleworth	Great Britain	7:50.52	
6	7	Henrik Christiansen	Norway	7:51.84	
7	8	Gergely Gyurta	Hungary	7:54.32	
8	1	Joris Bouchaut	France	7:58.54	
