= 2018 FINA World Swimming Championships (25 m) – Men's 1500 metre freestyle =

Men's 1500 metre freestyle at the 2018 FINA World Swimming Championships (25 m)
- Venue: Hangzhou Sports Park Stadium
- Dates: 15 December (heats); 16 December (final)
- Competitors: 24 from 20 nations
- Winning time: 14:09.14

Medalists
gold medal	Mykhailo Romanchuk	Ukraine
silver medal	Gregorio Paltrinieri	Italy
bronze medal	Henrik Christiansen	Norway

The men's 1500 metre freestyle competition of the 2018 FINA World Swimming Championships (25 m) was on 15 and 16 December 2018.

== Records ==
Prior to the competition, the existing world and championship records were as follows.

	Name	Nation	Time	Location	Date
World record	Gregorio Paltrinieri	Italy	14:08.06	Netanya	4 December 2015
Championship record	Park Tae-hwan	South Korea	14:15.51	Windsor	11 December 2016

The following records were established during the competition:

Date	Event	Name	Nation	Time	Record
16 December	Final	Mykhailo Romanchuk	Ukraine	14:09.14	CR

== Results ==
=== Heats ===
The heats were started on 15 December at 12:11.

Rank	Heat	Lane	Name	Nationality	Time	Notes
1	3	4	Mykhailo Romanchuk	Ukraine	14:21.50	Q
2	3	6	Damien Joly	France	14:28.25	Q, NR
3	2	4	Henrik Christiansen	Norway	14:28.90	Q
4	3	5	Gregorio Paltrinieri	Italy	14:28.97	Q
5	2	1	Zane Grothe	United States	14:29.03	Q
6	2	6	David Aubry	France	14:30.72	Q
7	2	0	Ákos Kalmár	Hungary	14:31.94	Q
8	2	5	Jan Micka	Czech Republic	14:33.15	Q
9	2	3	Yaroslav Potapov	Russia	14:33.82	
10	3	1	Domenico Acerenza	Italy	14:33.89	
11	3	7	Serhiy Frolov	Ukraine	14:38.42	
12	1	5	Marcelo Acosta	El Salvador	14:45.78	NR
13	3	3	Wojciech Wojdak	Poland	14:47.17	
14	3	2	Ji Xinjie	China	14:51.47	
15	3	8	Marwan Elkamash	Egypt	15:00.64	
16	3	9	Aryan Makhija	India	15:01.44	NR
17	1	3	Ahmed Hafnaoui	Tunisia	15:02.25	
18	3	0	Huang Guo-ting	Chinese Taipei	15:05.16	
19	1	4	Quinton Hurley	New Zealand	15:14.65	
20	2	9	Óli Mortensen	Faroe Islands	15:17.47	
21	2	8	Cheuk Ming Ho	Hong Kong	15:20.46	
22	1	2	Pit Brandenburger	Luxembourg	15:25.72	NR
23	2	7	Qiu Ziao	China	15:26.35	
24	1	6	Amir Abbas Amrollahi Biuoki	Iran	16:29.26	NR
	2	2	Gergely Gyurta	Hungary	DNS	

=== Final ===
The final was held on 16 December at 18:07.

Rank	Lane	Name	Nationality	Time	Notes
1st place, gold medalist(s)	4	Mykhailo Romanchuk	Ukraine	14:09.14	CR, NR
2nd place, silver medalist(s)	6	Gregorio Paltrinieri	Italy	14:09.87	
3rd place, bronze medalist(s)	3	Henrik Christiansen	Norway	14:19.39	NR
4	7	David Aubry	France	14:23.44	NR
5	5	Damien Joly	France	14:24.00	
6	8	Jan Micka	Czech Republic	14:27.73	
7	1	Ákos Kalmár	Hungary	14:35.94	
8	2	Zane Grothe	United States	14:51.22	
