= Swimming at the 2015 European Games – Men's 800 metre freestyle =

Men's 1500 metre freestyle at the 2015 European Games
- Venue: Aquatic Palace
- Dates: 26 June
- Competitors: 26 from 19 nations
- Winning time: 7:59.87

Medalists
gold medal	Nicolas D'Oriano	France
silver medal	Marcos Rodríguez	Spain
bronze medal	Henning Mühlleitner	Germany

The men's 800 metre freestyle event at the 2015 European Games in Baku took place on 26 June at the Aquatic Palace.

== Results ==
The heats were started at 11:30 and 19:09.

Rank	Heat	Lane	Name	Nationality	Time	Notes
1st place, gold medalist(s)	3	4	Nicolas D'Oriano	France	7:59.87	GR
2nd place, silver medalist(s)	3	7	Marcos Rodríguez	Spain	8:01.73	
3rd place, bronze medalist(s)	3	3	Henning Mühlleitner	Germany	8:04.33	
4	2	8	Kristóf Rasovszky	Hungary	8:04.57	
5	3	5	Ernest Maksumov	Russia	8:04.72	
6	2	4	Marc Hinawi	Israel	8:07.30	
7	3	2	Ricardo Rosales	Spain	8:07.36	
8	3	1	Ilya Druzhinin	Russia	8:08.36	
9	3	8	Lukas Ambros	Austria	8:13.11	
10	3	6	Thore Bermel	Germany	8:13.17	
11	2	3	Grega Popović	Slovenia	8:14.91	
12	1	4	Bogdan Scarlat	Romania	8:15.19	
13	1	3	Adam Staniszewski	Poland	8:17.48	
14	2	1	Wiktor Jaszczak	Poland	8:17.49	
15	2	0	Erik Årsland Gidskehaug	Norway	8:18.21	
16	2	5	Victor Johansson	Sweden	8:19.67	
17	1	6	Guilherme Pina	Portugal	8:19.89	
18	2	6	Logan Vanhuys	Belgium	8:21.91	
19	2	9	Alexandre Coutinho	Portugal	8:22.72	
20	2	2	Kyrylo Garashchenko	Ukraine	8:23.80	
21	1	2	Bogdan Petre	Romania	8:24.71	
22	1	5	Frederik Jessen	Denmark	8:25.33	
23	1	8	Igor Kostovski	Croatia	8:32.80	
24	1	7	Eivind Bjelland	Norway	8:36.49	
25	1	1	Juho Grönblom	Finland	8:36.50	
26	2	7	Batuhan Hakan	Turkey	9:05.38	
	1	0	Tom Derbyshire	Great Britain	DNS	
