= Swimming at the 2016 European Aquatics Championships – Men's 1500 metre freestyle =

Men's 1500 metre freestyle at the 2016 European Aquatics Championships
- Dates: 17–18 May
- Competitors: 35 from 21 nations
- Winning time: 14:34.04

Medalists
| gold medal | Gregorio Paltrinieri | Italy |
| silver medal | Gabriele Detti | Italy |
| bronze medal | Mykhailo Romanchuk | Ukraine |

The routine competition of the 2016 European Aquatics Championships was held on 17 and 18 May 2016.

== Records ==
Prior to the competition, the existing world, European and championship records were as follows.

| | Name | Nation | Time | Location | Date |
|---|---|---|---|---|---|
| World record | Sun Yang | China | 14:31.02 | London | 4 August 2012 |
| European record | Gregorio Paltrinieri | Italy | 14:39.67 | Kazan | 8 August 2015 |
| Championship record | Gregorio Paltrinieri | Italy | 14:39.93 | Berlin | 20 August 2014 |

== Results ==
=== Heats ===
The heats were held on 17 May at 11:29.

| Rank | Heat | Lane | Name | Nationality | Time | Notes |
|---|---|---|---|---|---|---|
| 1 | 4 | 4 | Gregorio Paltrinieri | Italy | 14:46.81 | Q |
| 2 | 3 | 4 | Gabriele Detti | Italy | 14:58.56 | Q |
| 3 | 3 | 2 | Jan Micka | Czech Republic | 14:58.62 | Q |
| 4 | 4 | 6 | Mykhailo Romanchuk | Ukraine | 14:59.13 | Q |
| 5 | 4 | 5 | Henrik Christiansen | Norway | 15:00.27 | Q |
| 6 | 4 | 7 | Serhiy Frolov | Ukraine | 15:02.33 | Q |
| 7 | 3 | 5 | Gergely Gyurta | Hungary | 15:05.34 | Q |
| 8 | 3 | 1 | Wojciech Wojdak | Poland | 15:06.56 | Q |
| 9 | 4 | 0 | Joris Bouchaut | France | 15:07.41 | |
| 10 | 4 | 9 | Antonio Arroyo | Spain | 15:07.71 | |
| 11 | 4 | 1 | Ruwen Straub | Germany | 15:08.11 | |
| 12 | 3 | 3 | Timothy Shuttleworth | Great Britain | 15:08.84 | |
| 13 | 4 | 2 | Daniel Jervis | Great Britain | 15:09.69 | |
| 14 | 4 | 3 | Stephen Milne | Great Britain | 15:09.73 | |
| 15 | 3 | 0 | Marc Sánchez | Spain | 15:10.06 | |
| 16 | 3 | 9 | Kristóf Rasovszky | Hungary | 15:11.34 | |
| 17 | 3 | 8 | Anton Ipsen | Denmark | 15:11.91 | |
| 18 | 3 | 7 | Richárd Nagy | Slovakia | 15:16.17 | |
| 19 | 2 | 1 | Nezir Karap | Turkey | 15:16.29 | |
| 20 | 3 | 6 | Pál Joensen | Faroe Islands | 15:16.44 | |
| 21 | 2 | 4 | Martin Bau | Slovenia | 15:16.71 | |
| 22 | 2 | 3 | Marc Hinawi | Israel | 15:19.28 | |
| 23 | 2 | 7 | Victor Johansson | Sweden | 15:20.44 | |
| 24 | 2 | 2 | Filip Zaborowski | Poland | 15:20.68 | |
| 25 | 4 | 8 | Nicolas D'Oriano | France | 15:25.80 | |
| 26 | 2 | 5 | Lander Hendrickx | Belgium | 15:25.90 | |
| 27 | 2 | 6 | Vuk Čelić | Serbia | 15:31.65 | |
| 28 | 2 | 9 | Ediz Yıldırımer | Turkey | 15:34.16 | |
| 29 | 1 | 4 | Truls Wigdel | Norway | 15:36.78 | |
| 30 | 1 | 3 | Roman Dmitriyev | Czech Republic | 15:36.81 | |
| 31 | 1 | 5 | Grega Popović | Slovenia | 15:41.01 | |
| 32 | 2 | 8 | Ján Kútnik | Czech Republic | 15:50.53 | |
| 33 | 2 | 0 | Oli Mortensen | Faroe Islands | 16:24.42 | |
| 34 | 1 | 2 | Franc Aleksi | Albania | 16:36.10 | |
| 35 | 1 | 6 | Andrej Stojanoski | Macedonia | 17:24.96 | |

=== Final ===
The final was held on 18 May at 18:02.

| Rank | Lane | Name | Nationality | Time | Notes |
|---|---|---|---|---|---|
| 1st place, gold medalist(s) | 4 | Gregorio Paltrinieri | Italy | 14:34.04 | ER, CR |
| 2nd place, silver medalist(s) | 5 | Gabriele Detti | Italy | 14:48.75 | |
| 3rd place, bronze medalist(s) | 6 | Mykhailo Romanchuk | Ukraine | 14:50.33 | |
| 4 | 1 | Gergely Gyurta | Hungary | 14:57.06 | |
| 5 | 3 | Jan Micka | Czech Republic | 14:58.73 | |
| 6 | 8 | Wojciech Wojdak | Poland | 14:59.66 | |
| 7 | 2 | Henrik Christiansen | Norway | 15:04.60 | |
| 8 | 7 | Serhiy Frolov | Ukraine | 15:05.05 | |
