= Swimming at the 2018 European Aquatics Championships – Men's 400 metre freestyle =

Men's 400 metre freestyle at the 2018 European Aquatics Championships
- Venue: Tollcross International Swimming Centre
- Dates: 3 August
- Competitors: 35 from 22 nations
- Winning time: 3:45.18

Medalists
gold medal	Mykhailo Romanchuk	Ukraine
silver medal	Henrik Christiansen	Norway
bronze medal	Henning Mühlleitner	Germany

The Men's 400 metre freestyle competition of the 2018 European Aquatics Championships was held on 3 August 2018.

== Records ==
Before the competition, the existing world and championship records were as follows.

	Name	Nation	Time	Location	Date
World record European record	Paul Biedermann	Germany	3:40.07	Rome	26 July 2009
Championship record	Gabriele Detti	Italy	3:44.01	London	16 May 2016

== Results ==
=== Heats ===
The heats were started at 09:50.

Rank	Heat	Lane	Name	Nationality	Time	Notes
1	3	4	Mykhailo Romanchuk	Ukraine	3:46.95	Q
2	3	2	Poul Zellmann	Germany	3:47.14	Q
3	3	3	Henning Mühlleitner	Germany	3:47.29	Q
4	4	4	Felix Auböck	Austria	3:48.01	Q
5	4	2	Victor Johansson	Sweden	3:48.05	Q
6	4	3	Henrik Christiansen	Norway	3:48.14	Q
7	3	8	Jan Micka	Czech Republic	3:49.17	Q
8	3	5	Wojciech Wojdak	Poland	3:49.67	Q
9	3	6	Filip Zaborowski	Poland	3:49.72	
10	4	8	David Aubry	France	3:49.87	
11	4	5	Domenico Acerenza	Italy	3:50.00	
12	3	1	Stephen Milne	Great Britain	3:50.05	
13	4	7	Jay Lelliott	Great Britain	3:50.21	
14	3	9	Marin Mogić	Croatia	3:50.48	
15	4	1	Martin Malyutin	Russia	3:50.94	
16	2	8	Robin Hanson	Sweden	3:51.33	
17	3	0	Balázs Holló	Hungary	3:51.56	
18	2	4	Richard Nagy	Slovakia	3:51.86	
19	2	0	Miguel Nascimento	Portugal	3:51.89	
20	4	9	Adam Paulsson	Sweden	3:51.98	
21	4	0	Roman Fuchs	France	3:52.77	
22	4	6	Viacheslav Andrusenko	Russia	3:53.02	
23	2	5	Denis Loktev	Israel	3:53.04	
24	2	2	Bogdan-Andrei Scarlat	Romania	3:53.80	
25	2	9	Ergecan Gezmiş	Turkey	3:53.52	
26	2	3	Ilya Druzhinin	Russia	3:54.40	
27	2	1	László Cseh	Hungary	3:55.49	
28	1	6	Batuhan Hakan	Turkey	3:56.81	
29	2	6	Yonatan Batsha	Israel	3:57.07	
30	1	4	Daniel Namir	Israel	3:57.37	
31	2	7	Andreas Georgakopoulos	Greece	4:00.36	
32	1	5	Irakli Revishvili	Georgia	4:00.95	
33	1	3	Alvi Hjelm	Faroe Islands	4:02.29	
34	1	2	Frenc Berdaku	Albania	4:09.78	
35	1	7	Spiro Goga	Albania	4:13.88	
—	3	7	Daniel Jervis	Great Britain	Did not start	

=== Final ===
The final was held at 17:09.

Rank	Lane	Name	Nationality	Time	Notes
1st place, gold medalist(s)	4	Mykhailo Romanchuk	Ukraine	3:45.18	
2nd place, silver medalist(s)	7	Henrik Christiansen	Norway	3:47.07	
3rd place, bronze medalist(s)	3	Henning Mühlleitner	Germany	3:47.18	
4	6	Felix Auböck	Austria	3:47.24	
5	2	Victor Johansson	Sweden	3:47.74	
6	1	Jan Micka	Czech Republic	3:48.46	
7	5	Poul Zellmann	Germany	3:48.97	
8	8	Wojciech Wojdak	Poland	3:49.08	
