= List of Ukrainian records in swimming =

The Ukrainian Records in swimming are the fastest times ever swum by a swimmer representing Ukraine. These records are kept/maintained by the Ukrainian Swimming Federation (Федерація плавання України).

Records are recognized for the following long course (50m) and short course (25m) events:

- freestyle: 50, 100, 200, 400, 800 and 1500;
- backstroke: 50, 100 and 200;
- breaststroke: 50, 100 and 200;
- butterfly: 50, 100 and 200;
- individual medley (I.M.): 100 (25m only), 200 and 400;
- relays: 4x50 free (25m only), 4x100 free, 4x200 free, 4x50 medley (25m only) and 4x100 medley.

All records were set in finals unless noted otherwise.

== Long Course (50m) ==
=== Men ===
Event	Time		Name	Club	Date	Meet	Location	Ref
50 m freestyle	21.38	sf	Vladyslav Bukhov	Ukraine	16 February 2024	World Championships	Doha, Qatar	
50 m freestyle	21.13	#	Nikita Sheremet	Ukraine	16 August 2026	European Championships	Paris, France	
100 m freestyle	48.26		Sergii Shevtsov	Ukraine	27 July 2017	World Championships	Budapest, Hungary	
200 m freestyle	1:47.91	h	Illia Linnyk	Kyiv	13 May 2026	Ukrainian Championships	Brovary, Ukraine	
400 m freestyle	3:45.18		Mykhailo Romanchuk	Ukraine	3 August 2018	European Championships	Glasgow, Great Britain	
800 m freestyle	7:40.05		Mykhailo Romanchuk	Ukraine	21 June 2022	World Championships	Budapest, Hungary	
1500 m freestyle	14:36.10		Mykhailo Romanchuk	Ukraine	16 August 2022	European Championships	Rome, Italy	
50 m backstroke	24.91		Oleksandr Zheltyakov	Ukraine	7 September 2023	World Junior Championships	Netanya, Israel	
100 m backstroke	53.73		Oleksandr Zheltyakov	Ukraine	5 September 2023	World Junior Championships	Netanya, Israel	
200 m backstroke	1:55.39		Oleksandr Zheltyakov	Ukraine	19 June 2024	European Championships	Belgrade, Serbia	
50m breaststroke	27.18		Oleh Lisohor	Ukraine	2 August 2002	European Championships	Berlin, Germany	
50m breaststroke	27.00	#	Stepan Babenko	Kyivska oblast	15 May 2026	Ukrainian Championships	Brovary, Ukraine	
50m breaststroke	26.72	#	Stepan Babenko	Ukraine	15 August 2026	European Championships	Paris, France	
100m breaststroke	58.67	tt	Ihor Borysyk	Donetsk	13 June 2009	Ukrainian National Cup	Kharkiv, Ukraine	
200m breaststroke	2:08.73		Ihor Borysyk	Ukraine	8 July 2009	Universiade	Belgrade, Serbia	
50m butterfly	22.27	WR	Andriy Govorov	Ukraine	1 July 2018	Sette Colli Trophy	Rome, Italy	
100m butterfly	51.10	h	Andriy Serdinov	Ukraine	14 August 2008	Olympic Games	Beijing, China	
200m butterfly	1:54.79		Denys Kesyl	Ukraine	24 July 2019	World Championships	Gwangju, South Korea	
200m individual medley	1:59.33	sf	Vadym Naumenko	Ukraine	22 June 2024	European Championships	Belgrade, Serbia	
400m individual medley	4:15.64		Maksym Shemberev	Ukraine	20 August 2011	World Junior Championships	Lima, Peru	
4×100m freestyle relay	3:15.94		Vladyslav Bukhov (49.46); Sergii Shevtsov (48.51); Illya Linnyk (48.73); Valentyn Nesterkin (49.24)	Ukraine	14 August 2022	European Championships	Rome, Italy	
4×200m freestyle relay	7:21.42	h	Serhiy Fesenko (1:50.42); Serhiy Advena (1:50.28); Dmytro Vereitinov (1:51.27); Maksym Kokosha (1:49.45)	Ukraine	29 July 2005	World Championships	Montreal, Canada	
4×100m medley relay	3:33.50		Oleksandr Zheltyakov (53.91); Volodymyr Lisovets (58.95); Arsenii Kovalov (51.90); Illia Linnyk (48.73)	Ukraine	23 June 2024	European Championships	Belgrade, Serbia	

Legend: # – Record awaiting ratification by Ukrainian Swimming Federation; WR – World record; ER – European record;
Records not set in finals: h – heat; sf – semifinal; r – relay 1st leg; rh – relay heat 1st leg; b – B final; † – en route to final mark; so – swim-off; tt – time trial

=== Women ===
Event	Time		Name	Club	Date	Meet	Location	Ref
50m freestyle	25.10		Darya Stepanyuk	Ukraine	11 August 2015	World Cup	Moscow, Russia	
100m freestyle	54.92	h	Darya Stepanyuk	Ukraine	30 July 2009	World Championships	Rome, Italy	
200m freestyle	1:59.03		Yana Klochkova	Ukraine	28 August 2003	Universiade	Daegu, South Korea	
400m freestyle	4:07.10		Yana Klochkova	Ukraine	4 August 2002	European Championships	Berlin, Germany	
800m freestyle	8:22.66		Yana Klochkova	Ukraine	22 September 2000	Olympic Games	Sydney, Australia	
1500m freestyle	16:27.76	h	Olga Beresnyeva	Ukraine	21 July 2003	World Championships	Barcelona, Spain	
50m backstroke	28.29		Daryna Zevina	Energy Standard	8 August 2017	Energy for Swim	Rome, Italy	
100m backstroke	59.90	sf	Daryna Zevina	Ukraine	29 July 2013	World Championships	Barcelona, Spain	
200m backstroke	2:07.48		Daryna Zevina	Ukraine	17 May 2016	European Championships	London, Great Britain	
50m breaststroke	30.60	h	Mariya Liver	Ukraine	8 August 2015	World Championships	Kazan, Russia	
100m breaststroke	1:06.67	sf	Viktoriya Solnceva	Ukraine	29 July 2013	World Championships	Barcelona, Spain	
200m breaststroke	2:23.01		Viktoriya Solnceva	Ukraine	2 August 2013	World Championships	Barcelona, Spain	
50m butterfly	26.52		Nadiya Koba	Kyiv	1 March 2012	Ukrainian Championships	Dnipropetrovsk, Ukraine	
100m butterfly	58.99		Kateryna Zubkova	Ukraine	9 August 2008	Olympic Games	Beijing, China	
200m butterfly	2:09.52		Yana Klochkova	Ukraine	30 August 2003	Universiade	Daegu, South Korea	
200m individual medley	2:10.68		Yana Klochkova	Ukraine	19 September 2000	Olympic Games	Sydney, Australia	
400m individual medley	4:33.59		Yana Klochkova	Ukraine	16 September 2000	Olympic Games	Sydney, Australia	
4×100m freestyle relay	3:43.52	h	Darya Stepanyuk (56.00); Oksana Serikova (56.21); Ganna Dzerkal (56.21); Iryna Amshennikova (55.10)	Ukraine	25 March 2007	World Championships	Melbourne, Australia	
4×200m freestyle relay	8:06.42	h	Valeriya Podlesna (2:02.56); Darya Stepanyuk (2:00.86); Ganna Dzerkal (2:02.93); Daryna Zevina (2:00.07)	Ukraine	28 July 2011	World Championships	Shanghai, China	
4×100m medley relay	4:04.11	h	Daryna Zevina (1:01.97); Mariya Liver (1:07.52); Lyubov Korol (59.68); Darya Stepanyuk (54.94)	Ukraine	24 August 2014	European Championships	Berlin, Germany	

Legend: # – Record awaiting ratification by Ukrainian Swimming Federation; WR – World record; ER – European record;
Records not set in finals: h – heat; sf – semifinal; r – relay 1st leg; rh – relay heat 1st leg; b – B final; † – en route to final mark; so – swim-off; tt – time trial

=== Mixed relay ===
Event	Time		Name	Club	Date	Meet	Location	Ref
4×100 m freestyle relay	3:42.88		Ivan Denysenko (52.34); Valeriia Timchenko (59.54); Margaryta Bokan (59.98); Viacheslav Ohnov (51.02)	Ukraine	24 June 2015	European Games	Baku, Azerbaijan	
4×100 m medley relay	3:52.73		Nika Sharafutdinova (1:02.52); Volodymyr Lisovets' (1:00.04); Arsenii Kovalov (53.29); Mariya D'Yachenko (56.88)	Ukraine	8 July 2022	European Junior Championships	Otopeni, Romania	
4×100 m medley relay	3:52.20	h, #	Nika Sharafutdinova (1:02.29); Yana Klikotska (1:09.70); Ihor Troianovskyi (51.46); Illia Linnyk (48.75)	Ukraine	11 August 2026	European Championships	Paris, France	

Legend: # – Record awaiting ratification by Ukrainian Swimming Federation;
Records not set in finals: h – heat; so – swim-off

== Short Course (25m) ==
=== Men ===
Event	Time		Name	Club	Date	Meet	Location	Ref
50 m freestyle	20.81		Nikita Sheremet	Ukraine	7 December 2025	European Championships	Lublin, Poland	
100 m freestyle	46.38	r	Sergii Shevtsov	Energy Standard	23 November 2019	International Swimming League	London, United Kingdom	
200 m freestyle	1:44.43	h	Illia Linnyk	Ukraine	3 December 2025	European Championships	Lublin, Poland	
400 m freestyle	3:38.93		Mykhailo Romanchuk	Aqua Centurions	9 November 2020	International Swimming League	Budapest, Hungary	
800 m freestyle	7:25.73		Mykhailo Romanchuk	Ukraine	21 November 2020	ISL Test Event	Budapest, Hungary	
1500 m freestyle	14:09.14		Mykhailo Romanchuk	Ukraine	16 December 2018	World Championships	Hangzhou, China	
50m backstroke	23.98	rh	Oleksandr Zheltyakov	Ukraine	6 December 2023 (Note: by official result source; 5 December 2023 by federation source, a typo)	European Championships	Otopeni, Romania	
100m backstroke	51.78	h	Oleksandr Zheltyakov	Ukraine	13 December 2024	World Championships	Budapest, Hungary	
200m backstroke	1:50.25		Oleksandr Zheltyakov	Ukraine	10 December 2023	European Championships	Otopeni, Romania	
50m breaststroke	26.17		Oleh Lisohor	Ukraine	21 January 2006	World Cup	Berlin, Germany	
100m breaststroke	56.97		Ihor Borysyk	Ukraine	11 December 2009	European Championships	Istanbul, Turkey	
200m breaststroke	2:03.93		Ihor Borysyk	Ukraine	10 November 2009	World Cup	Stockholm, Sweden	
50m butterfly	22.29	h	Andriy Govorov	Ukraine	30 August 2016	World Cup	Berlin, Germany	
100m butterfly	50.66	sf	Ihor Troianovskyi	Ukraine	4 December 2025	European Championships	Lublin, Poland	
200m butterfly	1:53.15	sf	Ihor Troianovskyi	Ukraine	6 December 2025	European Championships	Lublin, Poland	
100m individual medley	52.91	sf	Vadym Naumenko	Ukraine	12 December 2024	World Championships	Budapest, Hungary	
200m individual medley	1:55.22	sf	Vadym Naumenko	Ukraine	5 December 2025	European Championships	Lublin, Poland	
400m individual medley	4:07.39		Maksym Shemberev	Ukraine	23 November 2012	European Championships	Chartres, France	
4×50m freestyle relay	1:23.92		Nikita Sheremet (20.84); Illia Linnyk (20.96); Vladyslav Bukhov (20.75); Stepan Babenko (21.37)	Ukraine	2 December 2025	European Championships	Lublin, Poland	
4×100m freestyle relay	3:15.41		Serhii Latsko (48.81); Matvii Ukrainets (49.26); Danil Shapovalov (49.04); Stanislav Kyiashchenko (48.30)	Ukraine	19 December 2025	Lithuanian Open Championships	Vilnius, Lithuania	
4×200m freestyle relay	7:14.38		Serhiy Fesenko (1:48.77); Volodymyr Nikolaychuk (1:48.63); Serhiy Advena (1:50.60); Andriy Serdinov (1:46.38)	Ukraine	4 April 2002	World Championships	Moscow, Russia	
4×50m medley relay	1:34.35	h	Oleksandr Zheltyakov (24.25); Volodymyr Lisovets (26.44); Andriy Govorov (22.76); Vladyslav Bukhov (20.90)	Ukraine	17 December 2022	World Championships	Melbourne, Australia	
4×100m medley relay	3:28.62		Andriy Oleynyk (52.41); Oleg Lisogor (57.17); Serhiy Advena (51.17); Andriy Serdinov (47.87)	Ukraine	9 April 2006	World Championships	Shanghai, China	

Legend: # – Record awaiting ratification by Ukrainian Swimming Federation; WR – World record; ER – European record;
Records not set in finals: h – heat; sf – semifinal; r – relay 1st leg; rh – relay heat 1st leg; b – B final; † – en route to final mark; so – swim-off; tt – time trial

=== Women ===
Event	Time		Name	Club	Date	Meet	Location	Ref
50m freestyle	24.36	sf	Darya Stepanyuk	Ukraine	13 December 2009	European Championships	Istanbul, Turkey	
100m freestyle	53.55	sf	Darya Stepanyuk	Ukraine	10 December 2009	European Championships	Istanbul, Turkey	
200m freestyle	1:56.31		Daryna Zevina	Ukraine	6 October 2012	World Cup	Doha, Qatar	
400m freestyle	4:01.26		Yana Klochkova	Ukraine	5 April 2002	World Championships	Moscow, Russia	
800m freestyle	8:22.37		Yana Klochkova	Ukraine	9 December 1999	European Championships	Lisbon, Portugal	
1500m freestyle	16:25.06		Olga Beresnyeva	-	30 April 2002	-	Brazil	
50m backstroke	25.99		Daryna Zevina	Ukraine	7 December 2014	World Championships	Doha, Qatar	
100m backstroke	55.54		Daryna Zevina	Ukraine	4 December 2014	World Championships	Doha, Qatar	
200m backstroke	1:59.35		Daryna Zevina	Ukraine	26 August 2016	World Cup	Chartres, France	
50m breaststroke	30.37		Hanna Dzerkal	Ukraine	20 December 2014	Vladimir Salnikov Cup	Saint Petersburg, Russia	
100m breaststroke	1:05.66		Hanna Dzerkal	Ukraine	19 December 2014	Vladimir Salnikov Cup	Saint Petersburg, Russia	
200m breaststroke	2:19.50		Viktoriya Solnceva	Ukraine	8 August 2013	World Cup	Eindhoven, Netherlands	
50m butterfly	26.29		Nadiya Koba	Ukraine	22 December 2012	Vladimir Salnikov Cup	Saint Petersburg, Russia	
100m butterfly	58.24		Lyubov Korol	Ukraine	13 December 2008	European Championships	Rijeka, Croatia	
200m butterfly	2:08.04		Yana Klochkova	Ukraine	26 January 2003	World Cup	Berlin, Germany	
100m individual medley	1:00.31		Hanna Dzerkal	Donetsk	9 November 2014	Ukrainian Championships	Bila Tserkva, Ukraine	
200m individual medley	2:08.28		Yana Klochkova	Ukraine	12 December 2012	European Championships	Riesa, Germany	
400m individual medley	4:27.83		Yana Klochkova	Ukraine	19 January 2002	World Cup	Paris, France	
4×50m freestyle relay	1:39.81		Nadiya Koba (25.06); Valeriya Podlesna (25.50); Daryna Zevina (24.83); Oksana Serikova (24.42)	Ukraine	26 November 2010	European Championships	Eindhoven, Netherlands	
4×100m freestyle relay	3:46.68		Anastasiya Manakova; Yuliya Krutogolova; Oryna Yakuba; Margaryta Smirnova	Kyiv	23 November 2016	Ukrainian Cup	Bila Tserkva, Ukraine	
4×200m freestyle relay	^{[Note; 4x200]}							
4×50m medley relay	1:47.90		Kateryna Zubkova (26.82); Hanna Dzerkal (30.40); Lyubov Korol (26.43); Oksana Serikova (24.25)	Ukraine	13 December 2008	European Championships	Rijeka, Croatia	
4×100m medley relay	4:02.68		Iryna Amshennikova (1:01.19); Svitlana Bondarenko (1:08.73); Yana Klochkova (58.66); Olga Mukomol (54.10)	Ukraine	5 April 2002	World Championships	Moscow, Russia	

Legend: # – Record awaiting ratification by Ukrainian Swimming Federation; WR – World record; ER – European record;
Records not set in finals: h – heat; sf – semifinal; r – relay 1st leg; rh – relay heat 1st leg; b – B final; † – en route to final mark; so – swim-off; tt – time trial

fWR: World Record when originally swum.
Note 4x200: In the short-course Women's 4x200 Free Relay, the Federation has established a time of 8:15.00 as the mark a relay team must meet/better in order to establish the national record. As of December 2016, no team had yet done this.

=== Mixed relay ===
Event	Time	Name	Club	Date	Meet	Location	Ref
4×50m freestyle relay	1:31.51	Bogdan Plavin (21.97); Daryna Zevina (24.26); Ganna Dzerkal (24.69); Andriy Govorov (20.59)	Ukraine	6 December 2014	World Championships	Doha, Qatar	
4×50m medley relay	1:39.48	Daryna Zevina (26.10); Andriy Kovalenko (26.39); Andriy Govorov (22.37); Ganna Dzerkal (24.62)	Ukraine	4 December 2014	World Championships	Doha, Qatar	

Legend: # – Record awaiting ratification by Ukrainian Swimming Federation;
Records not set in finals: h – heat; so – swim-off
