= 2021 FINA World Swimming Championships (25 m) – Men's 1500 metre freestyle =

Swimming competition

Men's 1500 metre freestyle at the 2021 FINA World Swimming Championships (25 m)
- Venue: Etihad Arena
- Location: Abu Dhabi, United Arab Emirates
- Dates: 20 December (heats); 21 December (final)
- Competitors: 29 from 26 nations
- Winning time: 14:06.88 WR

Medalists
gold medal	Florian Wellbrock	Germany
silver medal	Ahmed Hafnaoui	Tunisia
bronze medal	Mykhailo Romanchuk	Ukraine

The Men's 1500 metre freestyle competition of the 2021 FINA World Swimming Championships (25 m) was held on 20 and 21 December 2021.

== Records ==
Prior to the competition, the existing world and championship records were as follows.

World record	Gregorio Paltrinieri (ITA)	14:08.06	Netanya, Israel	4 December 2015
Competition record	Mykhailo Romanchuk (UKR)	14:09.14	Hangzhou, China	16 December 2018

The following new records were set during this competition:

Date	Event	Name	Nation	Time	Record
21 December	Final	Florian Wellbrock	Germany	14:06.88	WR

== Results ==
=== Heats ===
The heats were started on 20 December at 11:58.

Rank	Heat	Lane	Name	Nationality	Time	Notes
1	3	5	Mykhailo Romanchuk	Ukraine	14:24.76	Q
2	2	6	Ahmed Hafnaoui	Tunisia	14:25.77	Q
3	3	6	Florian Wellbrock	Germany	14:25.79	Q
4	3	4	Gregorio Paltrinieri	Italy	14:28.11	Q
5	2	5	Damien Joly	France	14:30.90	Q
6	3	1	Daniel Wiffen	Ireland	14:32.13	Q, NR
7	2	3	Domenico Acerenza	Italy	14:34.03	Q
8	2	4	Henrik Christiansen	Norway	14:36.27	Q
9	2	2	Lukas Märtens	Germany	14:37.60	
10	3	8	Mert Kılavuz	Turkey	14:39.76	NR
11	2	1	José Paulo Lopes	Portugal	14:39.82	NR
12	2	8	Nguyễn Huy Hoàng	Vietnam	14:41.00	NR
13	3	2	Aleksandr Egorov	Russian Swimming Federation	14:47.39	
14	1	5	Marwan Elkamash	Egypt	14:48.68	NR
15	2	0	Krzysztof Chmielewski	Poland	14:51.21	
16	3	3	Jan Micka	Czech Republic	14:54.55	
17	2	7	Jon Jøntvedt	Norway	15:01.95	
18	1	4	Matan Roditi	Israel	15:05.05	
19	3	7	Kim Woo-min	South Korea	15:06.13	
20	2	9	Dimitrios Markos	Greece	15:07.43	
21	1	3	Kushagra Rawat	India	15:07.86	
22	3	9	Zhang Ziyang	China	15:18.99	
23	1	6	Eduardo Cisternas	Chile	15:23.30	NR
24	1	7	Adib Khalil	Lebanon	15:27.12	NR
25	1	0	Loris Bianchi	San Marino	15:38.63	
26	1	2	Joseph Macías	Ecuador	15:47.50	
27	1	1	Johan Nónskarð Dam	Faroe Islands	16:09.94	
28	1	8	Nikoli Blackman	Trinidad and Tobago	16:34.53	
29	1	9	Mark Imazu	Guam	17:59.68	
	3	0	Michael Brinegar	United States	DNS	

=== Final ===
The final was held on 21 December at 18:06.

Rank	Lane	Name	Nationality	Time	Notes
1st place, gold medalist(s)	3	Florian Wellbrock	Germany	14:06.88	WR
2nd place, silver medalist(s)	5	Ahmed Hafnaoui	Tunisia	14:10.94	AF
3rd place, bronze medalist(s)	4	Mykhailo Romanchuk	Ukraine	14:11.47	
4	6	Gregorio Paltrinieri	Italy	14:21.00	
5	1	Domenico Acerenza	Italy	14:24.31	
6	2	Damien Joly	France	14:25.62	
7	8	Henrik Christiansen	Norway	14:30.78	
8	7	Daniel Wiffen	Ireland	14:36.78	
