= Swimming at the 2020 Summer Olympics – Men's 400 metre freestyle =

Men's 400 metre freestyle at the Games of the XXXII Olympiad
- Venue: Tokyo Aquatics Centre
- Dates: 24 July 2021 (heats); 25 July 2021 (final)
- Competitors: 36 from 31 nations
- Winning time: 3:43.36

Medalists
1st place, gold medalist(s)		Ahmed Hafnaoui	Tunisia
2nd place, silver medalist(s)		Jack McLoughlin	Australia
3rd place, bronze medalist(s)		Kieran Smith	United States

The men's 400 metre freestyle event at the 2020 Summer Olympics was held in 2021 at the Tokyo Aquatics Centre. It was the event's twenty-seventh consecutive appearance, having been held at every edition since 1904.

== Summary ==
Ahmed Hafnaoui of Tunisia won the gold medal after entering the competition as the 16th seed. He was the lowest-seeded swimmer to win an Olympic swimming event since Kirsty Coventry, who won the 200-metre backstroke as the 21st seed in 2004. Hafnaoui entered with a personal-best time of 3:46.16, set the previous month. He improved that time in the heats and qualified eighth for the final by 0.14 seconds. The 18-year-old, the youngest swimmer in the final, was third after 100 metres and moved into second by the 150-metre mark. He trailed Australia's Jack McLoughlin by 0.31 seconds at the final turn before overtaking him during the final 50 metres. Hafnaoui won in 3:43.36, which was 2.80 seconds faster than his entry time. He became the first African swimmer to win the Olympic title in the event and the second Tunisian swimmer to win an Olympic gold medal, after Oussama Mellouli.

McLoughlin, swimming in lane 2, took the lead at the halfway mark and remained ahead through the final turn. He finished second in 3:43.52, 0.16 seconds behind Hafnaoui. The United States' Kieran Smith recorded the second-fastest final 50-metre split among the finalists and won the bronze medal. It was the first U.S. medal in the event since Peter Vanderkaay won bronze in 2012. Austria's Felix Auboeck, who was third at the final turn, finished joint fourth with Germany's Henning Mühlleitner. Mühlleitner recorded the fastest final 50-metre split of the field.

Italy's Gabriele Detti, the only returning Olympic medalist in the final, finished sixth in 3:44.88. Detti, who won bronze in 2016, finished more than one second outside his Italian record. Australia's Elijah Winnington, the only finalist whose personal best before the race was under 3:43, led during the opening stages before falling back after the halfway mark. He finished seventh in 3:45.20. The United States' Jake Mitchell, who qualified for the Olympic team through a time trial, finished eighth with a time 0.01 seconds slower than his preliminary time.

== Records ==
Prior to this competition, the existing world and Olympic records were as follows.

World record	Paul Biedermann (GER)	3:40.07	Rome, Italy	26 July 2009
Olympic record	Sun Yang (CHN)	3:40.14	London, Great Britain	28 July 2012

No new records were set during the competition.

== Qualification ==
The Olympic Qualifying Time for the event is 3:46.78. Up to two swimmers per National Olympic Committee (NOC) can automatically qualify by swimming that time at an approved qualification event. The Olympic Selection Time is 3:53.58. Up to one swimmer per NOC meeting that time is eligible for selection, allocated by world ranking until the maximum quota for all swimming events is reached. NOCs without a male swimmer qualified in any event can also use their universality place.

== Competition format ==
The competition consists of two rounds: heats and a final. The swimmers with the best 8 times in the heats advance to the final. Swim-offs are used as necessary to break ties for advancement to the next round.

== Schedule ==
All times are Japan Standard Time (UTC+9)

Date	Time	Round
24 July	19:38	Heats
25 July	10:52	Final

== Results ==
The swimmers with the top 8 times, regardless of heat, advance to the final.

=== Heats ===
Rank	Heat	Lane	Swimmer	Nation	Time	Notes
1	4	2	Henning Mühlleitner	Germany	3:43.67	Q
2	4	3	Felix Auböck	Austria	3:43.91	Q, NR
3	4	4	Gabriele Detti	Italy	3:44.67	Q
4	5	4	Elijah Winnington	Australia	3:45.20	Q
4	5	5	Jack McLoughlin	Australia	3:45.20	Q
6	5	2	Kieran Smith	United States	3:45.25	Q
7	5	1	Jake Mitchell	United States	3:45.38	Q
8	4	8	Ahmed Hafnaoui	Tunisia	3:45.68	Q
9	3	5	Antonio Djakovic	Switzerland	3:45.82	NR
10	5	6	Marco De Tullio	Italy	3:45.85	
11	4	7	Guilherme Costa	Brazil	3:45.99	
12	4	6	Lukas Märtens	Germany	3:46.30	
13	4	5	Danas Rapšys	Lithuania	3:46.32	
14	3	7	Marwan El-Kamash	Egypt	3:46.94	
15	3	1	Kregor Zirk	Estonia	3:47.05	NR
16	2	4	Alfonso Mestre	Venezuela	3:47.14	NR
17	3	4	Aleksandr Yegorov	ROC	3:47.71	
18	5	8	Gábor Zombori	Hungary	3:47.99	
19	5	7	Ji Xinjie	China	3:48.27	
20	4	1	Kieran Bird	Great Britain	3:48.55	
21	3	3	Henrik Christiansen	Norway	3:48.88	
22	5	3	Martin Malyutin	ROC	3:49.49	
23	3	2	Zac Reid	New Zealand	3:49.85	
24	2	3	Martin Bau	Slovenia	3:52.56	
25	2	2	Joaquín Vargas	Peru	3:52.94	
26	3	8	Lee Ho-joon	South Korea	3:53.23	
27	1	5	Eduardo Cisternas	Chile	3:54.10	NR
28	3	6	David Aubry	France	3:55.01	
29	2	6	Aflah Fadlan Prawira	Indonesia	3:55.08	
30	2	7	Wesley Roberts	Cook Islands	3:55.65	
31	1	4	Igor Mogne	Mozambique	3:56.56	
32	1	3	Irakli Revishvili	Georgia	3:57.49	
33	2	5	Welson Sim	Malaysia	3:58.25	
34	2	8	Alex Sobers	Barbados	3:59.14	
35	2	1	James Freeman	Botswana	4:03.10	
36	1	6	Filip Derkoski	North Macedonia	4:03.34	

=== Final ===
Rank	Lane	Swimmer	Nation	Time	Notes
1st place, gold medalist(s)	8	Ahmed Hafnaoui	Tunisia	3:43.36	
2nd place, silver medalist(s)	2	Jack McLoughlin	Australia	3:43.52	
3rd place, bronze medalist(s)	7	Kieran Smith	United States	3:43.94	
4	4	Henning Mühlleitner	Germany	3:44.07	
4	5	Felix Auböck	Austria	3:44.07	
6	3	Gabriele Detti	Italy	3:44.88	
7	6	Elijah Winnington	Australia	3:45.20	
8	1	Jake Mitchell	United States	3:45.39	
