= Swimming at the 2022 European Aquatics Championships – Men's 1500 metre freestyle =

Men's 1500 metre freestyle at the 2022 European Aquatics Championships
- Venue: Foro Italico
- Dates: 15 August (heats); 16 August (final)
- Competitors: 11 from 8 nations
- Winning time: 14:36.10

Medalists
gold medal	Mykhailo Romanchuk	Ukraine
silver medal	Gregorio Paltrinieri	Italy
bronze medal	Damien Joly	France

The Men's 1500 metre freestyle competition of the 2022 European Aquatics Championships was held on 15 and 16 August 2022.

== Records ==
Prior to the competition, the existing world, European and championship records were as follows.

	Name	Nationality	Time	Location	Date
World record	Sun Yang	China	14:31.02	London	28 July 2012
European record	Gregorio Paltrinieri	Italy	14:32.80	Budapest	25 June 2022
Championship record	Gregorio Paltrinieri	Italy	14:34.04	London	18 May 2016

== Results ==
=== Heats ===
The heats were started on 15 August at 10:17.

Rank	Heat	Lane	Name	Nationality	Time	Notes
1	2	5	Mykhailo Romanchuk	Ukraine	14:58.20	Q
2	2	3	Damien Joly	France	15:01.44	Q
3	2	4	Gregorio Paltrinieri	Italy	15:01.74	Q
4	1	3	Domenico Acerenza	Italy	15:04.52	Q
5	1	4	Florian Wellbrock	Germany	15:06.18	Q
6	1	6	Luca De Tullio	Italy	15:06.87	
7	1	2	Henrik Christiansen	Norway	15:08.14	Q
8	2	2	Carlos Garach	Spain	15:08.78	Q
9	1	5	Oliver Klemet	Germany	15:10.05	Q
10	1	7	Dimitrios Markos	Greece	15:14.11	
11	2	1	Yoav Romano	Israel	15:45.21	
	2	6	Victor Johansson	Sweden	Did not start	
	2	7	Joris Bouchaut	France	Did not start	

=== Final ===
The final was held at 18:52.

Rank	Lane	Name	Nationality	Time	Notes
1st place, gold medalist(s)	4	Mykhailo Romanchuk	Ukraine	14:36.10	NR
2nd place, silver medalist(s)	3	Gregorio Paltrinieri	Italy	14:39.79	
3rd place, bronze medalist(s)	5	Damien Joly	France	14:50.86	
4	6	Domenico Acerenza	Italy	14:56.15	
5	2	Florian Wellbrock	Germany	15:02.51	
6	1	Carlos Garach	Spain	15:05.11	
7	7	Henrik Christiansen	Norway	15:07.98	
8	8	Oliver Klemet	Germany	15:10.57	
