= Albania at the 2018 European Championships =

- IOC code: ALB

in (United Kingdom) Glasgow (Germany) Berlin 2 August 2018 – 12 August 2018
- Competitors: 8 (6 men and 2 women) in 2 sports
- Medals: Gold 0 Silver 0 Bronze 0 Total 0

European Championships appearances
- 2018; 2022

Albania competed at the inaugural 7 sports 2018 European Championships from 2 to 12 August 2018. It competed in 2 sports.

== Aquatics ==
=== Swimming ===
A total of 5 swimmers (4 men and 1 woman) represented Albania in the swimming events.

Men

Athlete	Event	Heats		Semifinal		Final	
Athlete	Event	Result	Rank	Result	Rank	Result	Rank
Franc Aleksi	200 m freestyle	1:59.23	58	did not advance			
Franc Aleksi	1500 m freestyle	16:29.27	20	—N/a		did not advance	
Deni Baholli	100 m freestyle	55.60	80	did not advance			
Deni Baholli	50 m breaststroke	31.43	53	did not advance			
Deni Baholli	100 m breaststroke	DQ		did not advance			
Frenc Berdaku	400 m freestyle	4:09.78	34	—N/a		did not advance	
Frenc Berdaku	800 m freestyle	8:44.70	26	—N/a		did not advance	
Spiro Goga	400 m freestyle	4:13.88	35	—N/a		did not advance	
Spiro Goga	800 m freestyle	DNS		—N/a		did not advance	

Women

Athlete	Event	Heats		Semifinal		Final	
Athlete	Event	Result	Rank	Result	Rank	Result	Rank
Nikol Merizaj	50 m freestyle	27.21	50	did not advance			
Nikol Merizaj	100 m freestyle	1:00.59	50	did not advance			
Nikol Merizaj	200 m freestyle	2:12.28	53	did not advance			

== Athletics ==
A total of 3 athletes (2 men and 1 woman) represented Albania in the athletics events.

Men
Track and road

Athlete	Event	Heats		Semifinal		Final	
Athlete	Event	Result	Rank	Result	Rank	Result	Rank
Franko Burraj	400 metres	47.56	28	did not advance			

Field events

Athletes	Event	Qualification		Final	
Athletes	Event	Distance	Position	Distance	Position
Izmir Smajlaj	Long jump	7.71	12 q	7.83	10

Women
Track and road

Athlete	Event	Heats		Semifinal		Final	
Athlete	Event	Result	Rank	Result	Rank	Result	Rank
Luiza Gega	3000 m steeplechase	9:33.11	2 Q	—N/a		9:24.78	4
