= Swimming at the 2017 Summer Universiade – Men's 1500 metre freestyle =

Men's 1500 metre freestyle at the 2017 Summer Universiade
- Venue: National Taiwan Sport University Arena
- Location: Taipei, Taiwan
- Dates: 21 August (heats); 22 August (final)
- Competitors: 25 from 19 nations
- Winning time: 14:47.75

Medalists
gold medal	Gregorio Paltrinieri	Italy
silver medal	Mykhailo Romanchuk	Ukraine
bronze medal	Gergely Gyurta	Hungary

The Men's 1500 metre freestyle competition at the 2017 Summer Universiade was held on 21 and 22 August 2017.

== Records ==
Prior to the competition, the existing world and Universiade records were as follows.

World record	Sun Yang (CHN)	14:31.02	London, Great Britain	4 August 2012
Competition record	Przemysław Stańczyk (POL)	14:51.06	Belgrade, Serbia	9 July 2009

The following new records were set during this competition.

Date	Event	Name	Nationality	Time	Record
22 August	Final	Gregorio Paltrinieri	Italy	14:47.75	UR

== Results ==
=== Heats ===
The heats were held on 21 August at 10:13.

Rank	Heat	Lane	Name	Nationality	Time	Notes
1	4	2	Domenico Acerenza	Italy	14:58.14	Q
2	3	4	Mykhailo Romanchuk	Ukraine	15:05.19	Q
3	4	4	Gregorio Paltrinieri	Italy	15:07.87	Q
4	4	5	Gergely Gyurta	Hungary	15:11.95	Q
5	3	3	Patrick Ransford	United States	15:12.64	Q
6	3	2	Shingo Nakaya	Japan	15:12.68	Q
7	3	7	Jay Lelliott	Great Britain	15:13.05	Q
8	4	1	Tobias Robinson	Great Britain	15:14.23	Q
9	4	6	Joris Bouchaut	France	15:15.59	
10	2	2	Krzysztof Pielowski	Poland	15:24.04	
11	3	1	Mathis Castera	France	15:26.53	
12	4	7	Joshua Parrish	Australia	15:27.71	
13	2	4	Huang Guo-ting	Chinese Taipei	15:28.55	
14	4	8	Ernest Maksumov	Russia	15:29.46	
15	3	5	Jan Micka	Czech Republic	15:30.23	
16	4	3	Serhiy Frolov	Ukraine	15:30.99	
17	2	3	Cho Cheng-chi	Chinese Taipei	15:45.33	
18	3	6	Kevin Litherland	United States	15:45.70	
19	3	8	Lucas Kanieski	Brazil	15:52.67	
20	2	2	Choi Min-woo	South Korea	15:55.53	
21	2	6	Michael Mincham	New Zealand	15:59.31	
22	2	7	Christian Mayer Martinelli	Peru	16:32.83	
23	1	5	Jux Solita	Philippines	17:15.14	
24	1	4	Cristofer Lanuza	Costa Rica	17:20.60	
25	1	3	Aleem Mohammed	Trinidad and Tobago	19:05.81	

=== Final ===
The final was held on 22 August at 19:02.

Rank	Lane	Name	Nationality	Time	Notes
1st place, gold medalist(s)	3	Gregorio Paltrinieri	Italy	14:47.75	UR
2nd place, silver medalist(s)	5	Mykhailo Romanchuk	Ukraine	14:57.51	
3rd place, bronze medalist(s)	6	Gergely Gyurta	Hungary	15:01.11	
4	7	Shingo Nakaya	Japan	15:03.06	
5	1	Jay Lelliott	Great Britain	15:06.51	
6	2	Patrick Ransford	United States	15:11.42	
7	8	Tobias Robinson	Great Britain	15:11.46	
8	4	Domenico Acerenza	Italy	15:12.02	
