= Swimming at the 2016 European Aquatics Championships – Men's 400 metre freestyle =

Men's 400 metre freestyle at the 2016 European Aquatics Championships
- Dates: 16 May
- Competitors: 46 from 24 nations
- Winning time: 3:44.01

Medalists
gold medal	Gabriele Detti	Italy
silver medal	Henrik Christiansen	Norway
bronze medal	Péter Bernek	Hungary

The Men's 400 metre freestyle competition of the 2016 European Aquatics Championships was held on 16 May 2016.

== Records ==
Prior to the competition, the existing world, European and championship records were as follows.

	Name	Nation	Time	Location	Date
World record	Paul Biedermann	Germany	3:40.07	Rome	28 July 2009
European record	Paul Biedermann	Germany	3:40.07	Rome	28 July 2009
Championship record	Yury Prilukov	Russia	3:45.10	Eindhoven	18 March 2008

== Results ==
=== Heats ===
The heats were held at 10:00.

Rank	Heat	Lane	Name	Nationality	Time	Notes
1	5	2	Velimir Stjepanović	Serbia	3:46.72	Q
2	5	5	Péter Bernek	Hungary	3:47.05	Q
3	4	4	Gabriele Detti	Italy	3:47.18	Q
4	5	6	Maarten Brzoskowski	Netherlands	3:47.63	Q
5	4	0	Felix Auböck	Austria	3:47.92	Q
6	4	5	Henrik Christiansen	Norway	3:48.33	Q
7	5	3	Stephen Milne	Great Britain	3:48.43	Q
7	4	6	Filip Zaborowski	Poland	3:48.43	Q
9	4	3	Wojciech Wojdak	Poland	3:49.05	
10	5	8	Jan Micka	Czech Republic	3:49.46	
11	4	8	Matias Koski	Finland	3:50.02	
12	5	7	Timothy Shuttleworth	Great Britain	3:50.21	
13	5	9	Nezir Karap	Turkey	3:50.44	
14	1	7	Jan Świtkowski	Poland	3:50.57	
15	3	3	Martin Bau	Slovenia	3:50.90	
16	5	1	Max Litchfield	Great Britain	3:51.30	
17	3	7	Richárd Nagy	Slovakia	3:51.31	
18	4	2	Jordan Pothain	France	3:51.64	
19	4	7	Anton Ipsen	Denmark	3:51.76	
20	2	2	Henning Mühlleitner	Germany	3:52.22	
21	3	5	Joris Bouchaut	France	3:52.25	
21	3	8	Marc Hinawi	Israel	3:52.25	
23	2	4	Victor Johansson	Sweden	3:52.52	
24	3	0	Adam Paulsson	Sweden	3:52.55	
25	3	4	Dimitrios Dimitriou	Greece	3:52.58	
26	3	6	Ido Haber	Israel	3:52.76	
27	5	4	James Guy	Great Britain	3:52.91	
28	3	1	Kacper Klich	Poland	3:53.02	
29	4	9	David Brandl	Austria	3:53.37	
30	4	1	Miguel Durán	Spain	3:53.55	
31	3	2	Lander Hendrickx	Belgium	3:54.08	
32	2	7	Kristóf Rasovszky	Hungary	3:54.28	
33	2	3	Lorenz Weiremans	Belgium	3:54.38	
34	2	5	Vuk Čelić	Serbia	3:54.69	
35	5	0	Gergő Kis	Hungary	3:54.76	
36	2	1	Stefan Šorak	Serbia	3:55.26	
37	2	0	Kaan Özcan	Turkey	3:55.61	
38	1	6	Kristian Kron	Sweden	3:56.79	
39	2	8	Etay Gurevich	Israel	3:57.02	
40	1	3	Ján Kútnik	Czech Republic	3:57.51	
41	2	9	Irakli Revishvili	Georgia	3:57.98	
42	1	4	Pit Brandenburger	Luxembourg	3:58.32	
43	1	5	Ediz Yıldırımer	Turkey	3:58.37	
44	2	6	Truls Wigdel	Norway	3:59.44	
45	3	9	Alexei Sancov	Moldova	4:03.25	
46	1	2	Franc Aleksi	Albania	4:14.68	

=== Final ===
The final was held at 18:02.

Rank	Lane	Name	Nationality	Time	Notes
1st place, gold medalist(s)	3	Gabriele Detti	Italy	3:44.01	CR
2nd place, silver medalist(s)	7	Henrik Christiansen	Norway	3:46.49	
3rd place, bronze medalist(s)	5	Péter Bernek	Hungary	3:46.81	
4	2	Felix Auböck	Austria	3:46.88	
5	6	Maarten Brzoskowski	Netherlands	3:47.09	
6	4	Velimir Stjepanović	Serbia	3:47.48	
7	8	Filip Zaborowski	Poland	3:49.30	
8	1	Stephen Milne	Great Britain	3:49.49	
