= 2022 FINA World Swimming Championships (25 m) – Men's 1500 metre freestyle =

Swimming competition

Men's 1500 metre freestyle at the 2022 FINA World Swimming Championships (25 m)
- Venue: Melbourne Sports and Aquatic Centre
- Location: Melbourne, Australia
- Dates: 13 December
- Competitors: 16 from 13 nations
- Winning time: 14:16.88

Medalists
gold medal	Gregorio Paltrinieri	Italy
silver medal	Damien Joly	France
bronze medal	Henrik Christiansen	Norway

The Men's 1500 metre freestyle competition of the 2022 FINA World Swimming Championships (25 m) was held on 13 December 2022.

== Records ==
Prior to the competition, the existing world and championship records were as follows.

World record	Florian Wellbrock (GER)	14:06.88	Abu Dhabi, United Arab Emirates	21 December 2021
Competition record	Florian Wellbrock (GER)	14:06.88	Abu Dhabi, United Arab Emirates	21 December 2021

== Results ==
The slowest heats were started at 13:36, and the fastest heat at 20:55.

Rank	Heat	Lane	Name	Nationality	Time	Notes
1st place, gold medalist(s)	3	4	Gregorio Paltrinieri	Italy	14:16.88	
2nd place, silver medalist(s)	3	3	Damien Joly	France	14:19.62	NR
3rd place, bronze medalist(s)	3	2	Henrik Christiansen	Norway	14:24.08	
4	3	6	Shogo Takeda	Japan	14:25.95	NR
5	3	8	Logan Fontaine	France	14:27.90	
6	2	7	Daniel Jervis	Great Britain	14:30.47	
7	2	1	Charlie Clark	United States	14:33.93	
8	3	5	David Johnston	United States	14:35.27	
9	2	4	Kim Woo-min	South Korea	14:45.35	
10	2	2	Stuart Swinburn	Australia	14:51.00	
11	3	1	Marwan Elkamash	Egypt	14:53.57	
12	2	8	Lucas Alba	Argentina	14:56.41	
13	2	5	Kenta Ozaki	Japan	14:58.30	
14	2	3	Carlos Garach	Spain	14:59.37	
15	1	4	Jan Hercog	Austria	15:00.36	
16	1	3	Ivan Hart	Suspended Member Federation	16:07.94	
	1	5	Victor Johansson	Sweden	Did not start	
	2	6	Jon Jøntvedt	Norway	Did not start	
	3	7	Fei Liwei	China	Did not start	
