= Dmytro Vereitinov =

Ukrainian swimmer (born 1983)

Personal information
- Full name: Dmytro Yuriyovych Vereitinov
- National team: Ukraine
- Born: January 10, 1983 Kharkiv, Ukrainian SSR, Soviet Union
- Died: 8 February 2023 (aged 40) Kharkiv, Ukraine
- Height: 1.97 m (6 ft 6 in)
- Weight: 82 kg (181 lb)

Sport
- Sport: Swimming
- Strokes: Freestyle
- Club: SC Ukraina Kharkiv
- Coach: Yuriy Vereitinov

Dmytro Yuriyovych Vereitinov (Ukrainian: Дмитро Юрійович Вереітінов; born January 10, 1983) is a Ukrainian former swimmer, who specialized in freestyle events. He currently holds a Ukrainian record of 7:21.42 in the 4 × 200 m freestyle relay at the 2005 FINA World Championships in Montreal, Quebec, Canada. Vereitinov is also a member of SC Ukraina Kharkiv, and is trained by his father and lifelong coach Yuriy Vereitinov.

Vereitinov qualified for two swimming events at the 2004 Summer Olympics in Athens, by clearing a FINA B-cut of 1:52.55 (200 m freestyle) from the European Championships in Madrid, Spain. In the 200 m freestyle, Vereitinov eclipsed his personal best of 1:51.38 to lead the third heat, but finished only in twenty-seventh place from the morning's preliminaries. He also teamed up with Serhiy Fesenko, Serhiy Advena, and Maksym Kokosha in the 4 × 200 m freestyle relay. Swimming the third leg in heat one, Vereitinov recorded a split of 1:50.34, but the Ukrainians settled for sixth place and twelfth overall, in a final time of 7:24.13.
