= Serhiy Advena =

Ukrainian swimmer (born 1984)

Personal information
- Full name: Serhiy Mykolaiovych Advena
- National team: Ukraine
- Born: August 4, 1984 (age 41) Kyiv, Ukrainian SSR, Soviet Union
- Height: 1.90 m (6 ft 3 in)
- Weight: 82 kg (181 lb)

Sport
- Sport: Swimming
- Strokes: Freestyle, butterfly
- Club: ZS Kyiv
Medal record
Men's swimming
Representing Ukraine
World Championships (SC)
Bronze medal – third place	2006 Shanghai	4×100 m medley
Universiade
Gold medal – first place	2005 İzmir	4×100 m medley
Silver medal – second place	2003 Daegu	200 m butterfly
Bronze medal – third place	2005 İzmir	100 m butterfly
Military World Games
Gold medal – first place	2003 Catania	200 m butterfly
Silver medal – second place	2007 Hyderabad	100 m butterfly
Silver medal – second place	2007 Hyderabad	200 m butterfly
Bronze medal – third place	2007 Hyderabad	4x100 m medley
European Junior Championships
Gold medal – first place	2002 Linz	100 m butterfly
Silver medal – second place	2001 Malta	100 m butterfly
Bronze medal – third place	2001 Malta	200 m butterfly
Bronze medal – third place	2001 Malta	50 m butterfly
Bronze medal – third place	2002 Linz	200 m butterfly

Serhiy Mykolaiovych Advena (Ukrainian: Сергій Миколайович Адвена; born August 4, 1984) is a Ukrainian former swimmer who specializes in the freestyle and butterfly swimming styles. He is a two-time Olympian (2004 and 2008), and a multiple-time Ukrainian record holder in both 100 and 200 m butterfly. He also helped out the Ukrainian team to upset their American rivals and claim the medley relay title (3:38.49) at the 2005 Summer Universiade in İzmir, Turkey.

Advena made his Olympic debut in Athens 2004, competing in two swimming events. He also teamed up with Maksym Kokosha, Dmytro Vereitinov, and Olympic stalwart Serhiy Fesenko in the 4 × 200 m freestyle relay. Swimming the anchor leg, Advena recorded a fastest split of 1:50.90, and the Ukrainian team went to finish the preliminary heats in twelfth overall, with a final time of 7:24.13. In the 200 m butterfly, Advena failed to qualify for the final, as he finished twelfth overall in his semifinal run in 1:58.11. His time was just two hundredths of a second (0.02s) ahead of Japan's Takeshi Matsuda, who beat him for the gold medal at the 2003 Summer Universiade in Daegu, South Korea.

Four years after competing in his first Olympics, Advena qualified for his second Ukrainian team, as a 24-year-old, at the 2008 Summer Olympics in Beijing. He finished sixth in the 200 m butterfly from the European Championships in Eindhoven, Netherlands, clearing a FINA A-standard entry time of 1:57.04. On the second day of the Games, Advena challenged seven other swimmers in heat five of the 200 m freestyle, including South Africa's Darian Townsend and Israel's Nimrod Shapira Bar-Or. He cruised to third place by a single tenth margin from Townsend in a Ukrainian record time of 1:48.18, but missed the semifinals by a 0.37-second deficit, as he placed twenty-third overall in the preliminaries. In the 200 m butterfly, Advena posted a time of 1:56.24 to obtain a fourteenth seed on the morning prelims. Then, he repeated his feat from Athens with a fifteenth-place time of 1:56.64 in the semifinals.
