= 2018 African Swimming Championships – Men's 800 metre freestyle =

Men's 800 metre freestyle at the 2018 African Swimming Championships
- Venue: Mohamed Boudiaf Olympic Complex
- Dates: 11 September (final)
- Competitors: 10 from 6 nations
- Winning time: 8:02.37

Medalists
gold medal	Marwan Elkamash	Egypt
silver medal	Marwan El-Amrawy	Egypt
bronze medal	Ahmed Hafnaoui	Tunisia

The Men's 800 metre freestyle competition of the 2018 African Swimming Championships was held on 11 September 2018.

== Records ==
Prior to the competition, the existing world and championship records were as follows.

	Name	Nation	Time	Location	Date
World record	Zhang Lin	China	7:32.12	Rome	29 July 2009
African record	Oussama Mellouli	Tunisia	7:35.27	Rome	29 July 2009
Championship record	Troyden Prinsloo	South Africa	8:03.34	Casablanca	4 May 2004

The following new records were set during this competition.

Date	Event	Name	Nationality	Time	Record
11 September	Final	Marwan Elkamash	Egypt	8:02.37	CR

== Results ==
=== Final ranking ===
The races were started on 11 September at 11:45.

Rank	Name	Nationality	Time	Notes
1st place, gold medalist(s)	Marwan Elkamash	Egypt	8:02.37	CR
2nd place, silver medalist(s)	Marwan El-Amrawy	Egypt	8:07.42	
3rd place, bronze medalist(s)	Ahmed Hafnaoui	Tunisia	8:08.74	
4	Mohamed Djaballah	Algeria	8:16.18	
5	Ruan Breytenbach	South Africa	8:16.53	
6	Lounis Khendriche	Algeria	8:17.05	
7	Mohamed Agili	Tunisia	8:18.06	
8	Righardt Muller	South Africa	8:37.65	
9	Amadou Ndiaye	Senegal	9:08.57	
	Ovesh Purahoo	Mauritius	Did not start	
