= Mykhailo Romanchuk =

Ukrainian swimmer (born 1996)

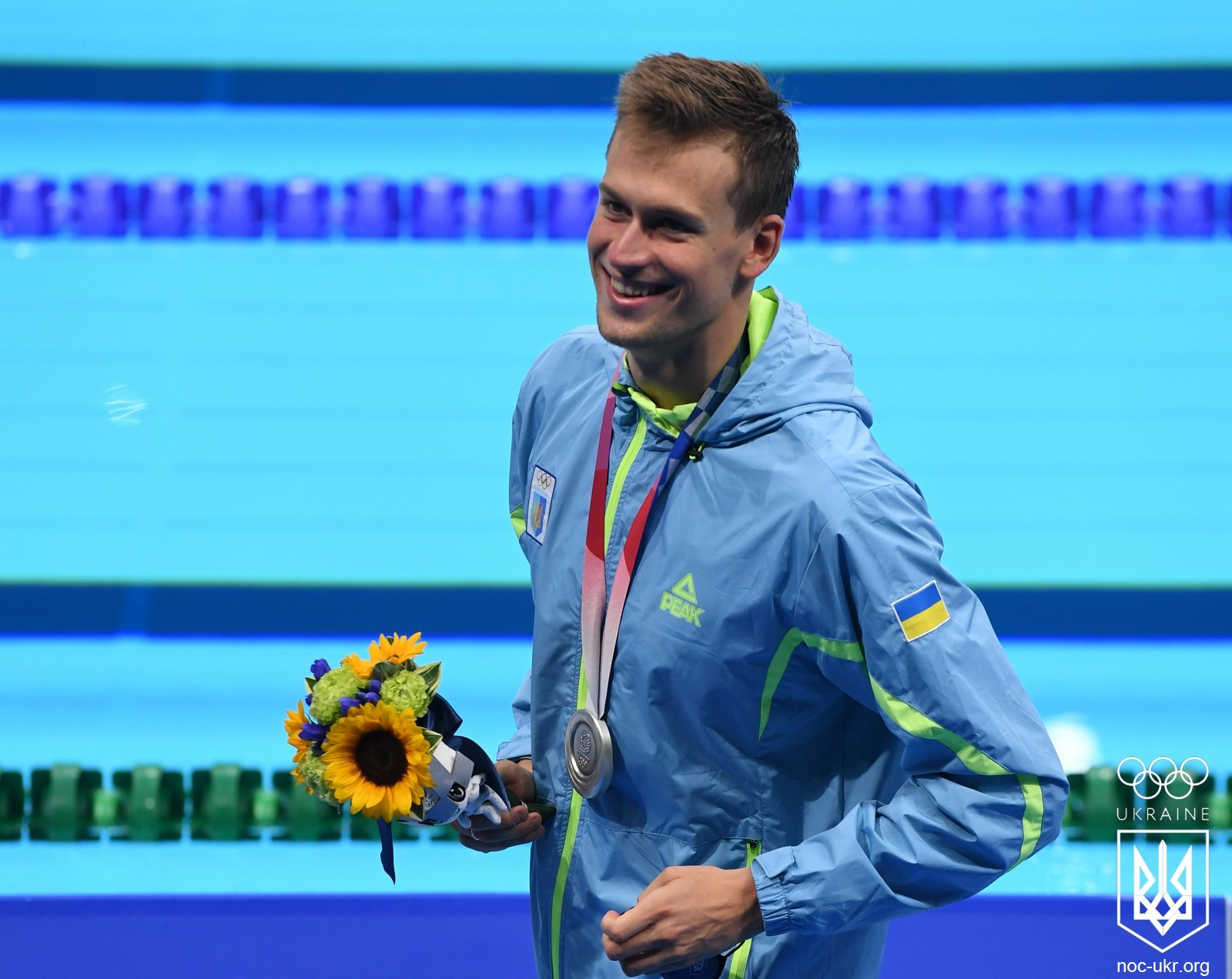
- Romanchuk with his silver medal at the 2020 Summer Olympics

Personal information
- Nationality: Ukrainian
- Born: 7 August 1996 (age 29) Rivne, Ukraine
- Height: 1.90 m (6 ft 3 in)
- Weight: 82 kg (181 lb)

Sport
- Sport: Swimming
- Strokes: Freestyle
- Club: Energy Standard
Medal record
Men's swimming
Representing Ukraine
Olympic Games
Silver medal – second place	2020 Tokyo	1500 m freestyle
Bronze medal – third place	2020 Tokyo	800 m freestyle
World Championships (LC)
Silver medal – second place	2017 Budapest	1500 m freestyle
Silver medal – second place	2019 Gwangju	1500 m freestyle
Bronze medal – third place	2022 Budapest	800 m freestyle
Bronze medal – third place	2022 Budapest	5 km open water
World Championships (SC)
Gold medal – first place	2018 Hangzhou	1500 m freestyle
Bronze medal – third place	2021 Abu Dhabi	1500 m freestyle
European Championships (LC)
Gold medal – first place	2018 Glasgow	400 m freestyle
Gold medal – first place	2018 Glasgow	800 m freestyle
Gold medal – first place	2020 Budapest	800 m freestyle
Gold medal – first place	2020 Budapest	1500 m freestyle
Gold medal – first place	2022 Rome	1500 m freestyle
Gold medal – first place	2024 Belgrade	800 m freestyle
Silver medal – second place	2018 Glasgow	1500 m freestyle
Silver medal – second place	2024 Belgrade	1500 m freestyle
Bronze medal – third place	2016 London	800 m freestyle
Bronze medal – third place	2016 London	1500 m freestyle
European Championships (SC)
Gold medal – first place	2017 Copenhagen	1500 m freestyle
Bronze medal – third place	2023 Otopeni	800 m freestyle
Bronze medal – third place	2023 Otopeni	1500 m freestyle
Universiade
Gold medal – first place	2017 Taipei	400 m freestyle
Silver medal – second place	2017 Taipei	800 m freestyle
Silver medal – second place	2017 Taipei	1500 m freestyle
Youth Olympic Games
Gold medal – first place	2014 Nanjing	400 m freestyle
Silver medal – second place	2014 Nanjing	800 m freestyle
European Junior Championships
Gold medal – first place	2014 Dordrecht	800 m freestyle
Silver medal – second place	2014 Dordrecht	1500 m freestyle
Bronze medal – third place	2014 Dordrecht	400 m freestyle

Romanchuk - Men's 1500M Freestyle Final, 2017 Budapest

Mykhailo Mykhailovych Romanchuk (Ukrainian: Михайло Михайлович Романчук; born 7 August 1996, Rivne, Ukraine) is a Ukrainian retired swimmer.

== Career ==
At the Singapore World Cup leg in October 2016, he set a world cup record of 14:15.49 in the 1500 meter freestyle (short course), breaking the previous record by over 12 seconds. He holds several distance freestyle national records and the current olympic record in the 800-meter freestyle.

In the Autumn of 2019, he was member of the inaugural International Swimming League swimming for the Energy Standard, who won the team title in Las Vegas, Nevada, in December.

On 27 July 2021, he set a record for Ukraine with a result of 7:41.28 and reached the final of the 800 meters freestyle at the Tokyo Olympics. Romanchuk reached the final with the best result.

== Personal life ==
He is married to Ukrainian athlete Maryna Bekh-Romanchuk.
