= Albania at the 2022 European Championships =

- WA code: ALB

in Munich 11 August 2022 – 22 August 2022
- Competitors: 5 in 3 sports
- Medals Ranked 30th: Gold 1 Silver 0 Bronze 0 Total 1

European Championships appearances
- 2018; 2022

Albania competed at the 2022 European Championships in Munich from August 11 to August 22, 2022.

== Medallists ==
Medal	Name	Sport	Event	Date
Gold	Luiza Gega	Athletics	Women's 3000 metres steeplechase	20 August

== Competitors ==
The following is the list of number of competitors in the Championships:

Sport	Men	Women	Total
Artistic gymnastics (men and women)	1	0	1
Athletics	0	1	1
Cycling	3	0	3
Total	4	1	5

== Athletics ==
Albania entered the following athletes.

Women
Track and road

Athlete	Event	Heats		Semifinal		Final	
Athlete	Event	Result	Rank	Result	Rank	Result	Rank
Luiza Gega	3000 m steeplechase	9:30.93	1 Q	—		9:11.31 CR	1st place, gold medalist(s)

== Cycling ==
=== Road ===
Men

Athlete	Event	Time	Rank
Marolino Hoxha	Road race	DNF	
Ylber Sefa	Road race	4:38:57	28
Olsian Velia	Road race	DNF	
