= Ahmed Hafnaoui =

Tunisian swimmer (born 2002)

Personal information
- Full name: Ahmed Ayoub Hafnaoui
- National team: Tunisia
- Born: 4 December 2002 (age 23) Métlaoui, Tunisia
- Height: 1.95 m (6 ft 5 in)
- Weight: 84 kg (185 lb)

Sport
- Sport: Swimming
- Strokes: Freestyle
- College team: Indiana University
- Coach: Jobrane Touili (2018–2021) Mark Schubert (Since 2023)
Medal record
Men's swimming
Representing Tunisia
Event	1st	2nd	3rd
Olympic Games	1	0	0
World Championships (LC)	2	1	0
World Championships (SC)	0	1	0
African Championships	0	1	3
Total	3	3	3
Olympic Games
Gold medal – first place	2020 Tokyo	400 m freestyle
World Championships (LC)
Gold medal – first place	2023 Fukuoka	800 m freestyle
Gold medal – first place	2023 Fukuoka	1500 m freestyle
Silver medal – second place	2023 Fukuoka	400 m freestyle
World Championships (SC)
Silver medal – second place	2021 Abu Dhabi	1500 m freestyle
African Championships
Silver medal – second place	2018 Algiers	4×200 m freestyle
Bronze medal – third place	2018 Algiers	800 m freestyle
Bronze medal – third place	2018 Algiers	1500 m freestyle
Bronze medal – third place	2018 Algiers	4×100 m freestyle

Ahmed Ayoub Hafnaoui (Arabic: أحمد أيوب حفناوي, romanized: Aḥmad Ayyūb Ḥafnāwi; born 4 December 2002) is a Tunisian swimmer. He is the African record holder in the long course 400-metre and 1500-metre freestyle, and the short course 800-metre and 1500-metre freestyle events. He competed in the 2020 Summer Olympics, where he won a gold medal in the men's 400-metre freestyle. He ranked No. 16 in the world and was the slowest qualifier for the final race but won Olympic gold with a time of 3:43.36. Hafnaoui was the only Tunisian to win Olympic gold at Tokyo 2020.

He finished 8th in the final of the 400 m freestyle at the 2018 Summer Youth Olympics in Buenos Aires.

Hafnaoui competed as a 16-year-old at the 2018 World Championships (SC) in the 400 meters, and the 1500 meters, but failed to make the final in either events. In 2021, Fina had him ranked as No. 3 in the men's 400 meter freestyle. At the age of 20, Hafnaoui competed at the 2023 World Championships in Fukuoka, and took gold in the 800 m freestyle, as well as also winning gold for the 1500 m freestyle with the second-fastest 1500 free time in history of 14:31.54.

Hafnaoui is currently serving a 21-month competition ban due to expire in January 2026 for an anti-doping rule violation after missing three tests in a 12-month period.

== Background ==
Hafnaoui's father, Mohamed Hafnaoui, was a Tunisian national team basketball player.

Hafnaoui began swimming at the age of six. He gravitated towards swimming rather than his father's sport of basketball in spite of the fact that there were just three 50-metre pools in all of Tunisia. When he was 12 years of age, Hafnaoui began training with the national swim program.

== Career ==
=== 2018 ===
2018 African Championships
Silver medal – second place	4x200 m freestyle	7:31.55
Bronze medal – third place	800 m freestyle	8:08.74
Bronze medal – third place	1500 m freestyle	15:45.46
Bronze medal – third place	4x100 m freestyle	3:27.92

At the African Championships in Algiers, Algeria, Hafnaoui competed in the 800 meter and 1,500 meter freestyle events, as well as the 4x100 and 4x200 freestyle events. He placed third in the 800 meter freestyle (8:08.74), 1,500 meter freestyle (15:45.46), and 4x100 meter men's freestyle (3:27.92), as well as second in the 4x200 freestyle (7:31.55).

At the Youth Olympics in Buenos Aires, Argentina, Hafnaoui competed in the 200 meter, 400 meter, and 800 meter freestyle events; he placed eighth in the 400 meter freestyle with a time of 3:55.94 and seventh in the 800 meter freestyle with a time of 8:04.43.

At the World Championships Short Course in Hangzhou, China, Hafnaoui competed in the 400 meter and 1500 meter freestyle events; he placed 19th in the 400 meter freestyle with a time of 3:45.98 and 17th in the 1500 meter freestyle with a time of 15:02.25.

=== 2019 ===
Hafnaoui competed in the 400 meter, 800 meter, and 1,500 meter freestyle events at the World Junior Championships in Budapest, Hungary; he placed fourth in the 800 meter freestyle with a time of 7:49.08 and sixth in the 1,500 meter freestyle with a time of 15:16.04.

=== 2021 ===
2020 Summer Olympics
Gold medal – first place	400 m freestyle	3:43.36

Hafnaoui competed in the 400 meter freestyle at the 2020 Summer Olympics in Tokyo, Japan, where he placed first with a time of 3:43.36. He is only the third swimmer in history to win an Olympic gold medal out of the 8th lane, the slowest qualifying lane. He also placed joint 10th in the 800 meter freestyle, missing qualification for the final.

In October, Hafnauoi announced he would be competing at Etihad Arena in December as part of the 2021 World Short Course Swimming Championships in Abu Dhabi, United Arab Emirates. He entered to compete in the 400 metre freestyle and 1500 metre freestyle events. Starting his competition on day one of the championships, 16 December, Hafnaoui swum a 3:40.30 in the prelims heats of the 400 metre freestyle to rank tenth overall. On Day five, Hafnaoui ranked second in the 1500 metre freestyle prelims heats, qualifying for the final with a time of 14:25.77. He won the silver medal in the final of the 1500 metre freestyle on day six in an African record time of 14:10.94. His time at the 800 metre mark also set a new African record in the 800 metre freestyle at 7:33.69.

=== 2023 ===
2023 World Aquatics Championships
Gold medal – first place	800 m freestyle	7:37.00
Gold medal – first place	1500 m freestyle	14:31.54
Silver medal – second place	400 m freestyle	3:40.70

On 11 January 2023, Hafnaoui won the gold medal in the 800-metre freestyle at the TYR Pro Swim Series in Knoxville, with a time of 7:53.10, which was over three full seconds faster than second-place finisher American Robert Finke. Two days later, he won the gold medal in the 400-metre freestyle with a time of 3:47.41. On the fourth day, he finished in a personal best time of 15:07.07 in the final of the 1500-metre freestyle, dropping 8.97 seconds from his previous personal best time, to win the silver medal. On 1 March, he lowered his personal best time by 6.83 seconds to a 15:00.24 and won the gold medal in the 1500-metre freestyle at the second stop of the Pro Swim Series, in Fort Lauderdale, United States. The following day he won the 400-metre freestyle in a time of 3:46.02. On day four of four, he finished in 7:48.50 in the 800-metre freestyle and won the gold medal.

At the 2023 World Aquatics Championships held in Fukuoka, Japan, Hafnaoui won gold in the 800-metre and 1500-metre freestyle events, and silver in the 400-metre freestyle. Hafnaoui will attend Indiana University in fall 2023 as a member of their men's swimming team.

== 2024-2025 ==
In April 2025, Ahmed Hafnaoui was suspended for 21 months due to three missed doping tests within a 12-month period. The ban is backdated to start from 11 April 2024 and ends on 10 January 2026. As a result, he was ineligible for the 2024 Paris Olympics and all results from April 2024 onwards were disqualified.

== Personal bests ==
Long Course Meters
Event	Time	Meet	Location	Date	Note(s)	Ref
50m freestyle	25.89	2020 Summer Olympics	Tokyo, Japan	25 July 2021		
100m freestyle	53.82	2023 World Aquatics Championships	Fukuoka, Japan	23 July 2023		
200m freestyle	01:49.50	2023 World Aquatics Championships	Fukuoka, Japan	23 July 2023		
400m freestyle	03:40.70	2023 World Aquatics Championships	Fukuoka, Japan	23 July 2023	AF	
800m freestyle	07:37.00	2023 World Aquatics Championships	Fukuoka, Japan	26 July 2023		
1500m freestyle	14:31.54	2023 World Aquatics Championships	Fukuoka, Japan	30 July 2023	AF, CR	

== Continental records ==
=== Short course metres (25 m pool) ===
No.	Event	Time		Meet	Location	Date	Status	Notes	Ref
1	800 m freestyle	7:33.69	†	2021 World Short Course Championships	Abu Dhabi, United Arab Emirates	21 December 2021	Current	AF, NR	
2	1500 m freestyle	14:10.94		2021 World Short Course Championships	Abu Dhabi, United Arab Emirates	21 December 2021	Current	AF, NR	

Legend: AF – African record; NR – Tunisian record; e – equalled existing record;
Records not set in finals: h – heat; sf – semifinal; r – relay 1st leg; rh – relay heat 1st leg; b – B final; † – en route to final mark; so – swim-off; tt – time trial

== Awards and honours ==
- FINA, Top 10 Moments: 2020 Summer Olympics (#1 for surprising Olympic champion title in 400 metre freestyle)
- Olympics.com, Top 5 Moments: Swimming at the 2020 Summer Olympics (#4 for gold medal in the 400 metre freestyle)
- Grand officier of the National Order of Merit of Tunisia (Tunisia, 2021)
- Swimming World, African Swimmer of the Year (male): 2021
- SwimSwam, Top 100 (Men's): 2022 (#16)

== Decoration ==
- First Class of the National Order of Merit (Tunisia, 20 August 2021)

== See also ==
- List of Olympic medalists in swimming (men)
- List of World Swimming Championships (25 m) medalists (men)
- List of African records in swimming
