= Maksym Kokosha =

Ukrainian former swimmer (born 1983)

Personal information
- Full name: Maksym Mykolaiovych Kokosha
- National team: Ukraine
- Born: 9 August 1983 (age 42) Kyiv, Ukrainian SSR, Soviet Union
- Height: 1.82 m (6 ft 0 in)
- Weight: 70 kg (154 lb)

Sport
- Sport: Swimming
- Strokes: Freestyle
- Club: Dynamo Kyiv
- Coach: Volodymyr Vorona

Maksym Mykolaiovych Kokosha (Ukrainian: Максим Миколайович Кокоша; born August 9, 1983, in Kyiv) is a Ukrainian former swimmer, who specialized in freestyle events. He is a single-time Olympian (2004), and a two-time Universiade finalist (2003 and 2005). He currently holds a Ukrainian record of 7:21.42 in the 4 × 200 m freestyle relay at the 2005 FINA World Championships in Montreal, Quebec, Canada. Kokosha is a member of the swimming team for Dynamo Kyiv, and is trained by longtime coach Volodymyr Vorona.

Kokosha qualified for the men's 4 × 200 m freestyle relay, as a member of the Ukrainian team, at the 2004 Summer Olympics in Athens. Teaming with Serhiy Fesenko, Serhiy Advena, and Dmytro Vereitinov in heat one, Kokosha swam a second leg and recorded a split of 1:52.03, but the Ukrainians settled for sixth place and twelfth overall, in a final time of 7:24.13.
