= Bogdan Scarlat =

Romanian swimmer

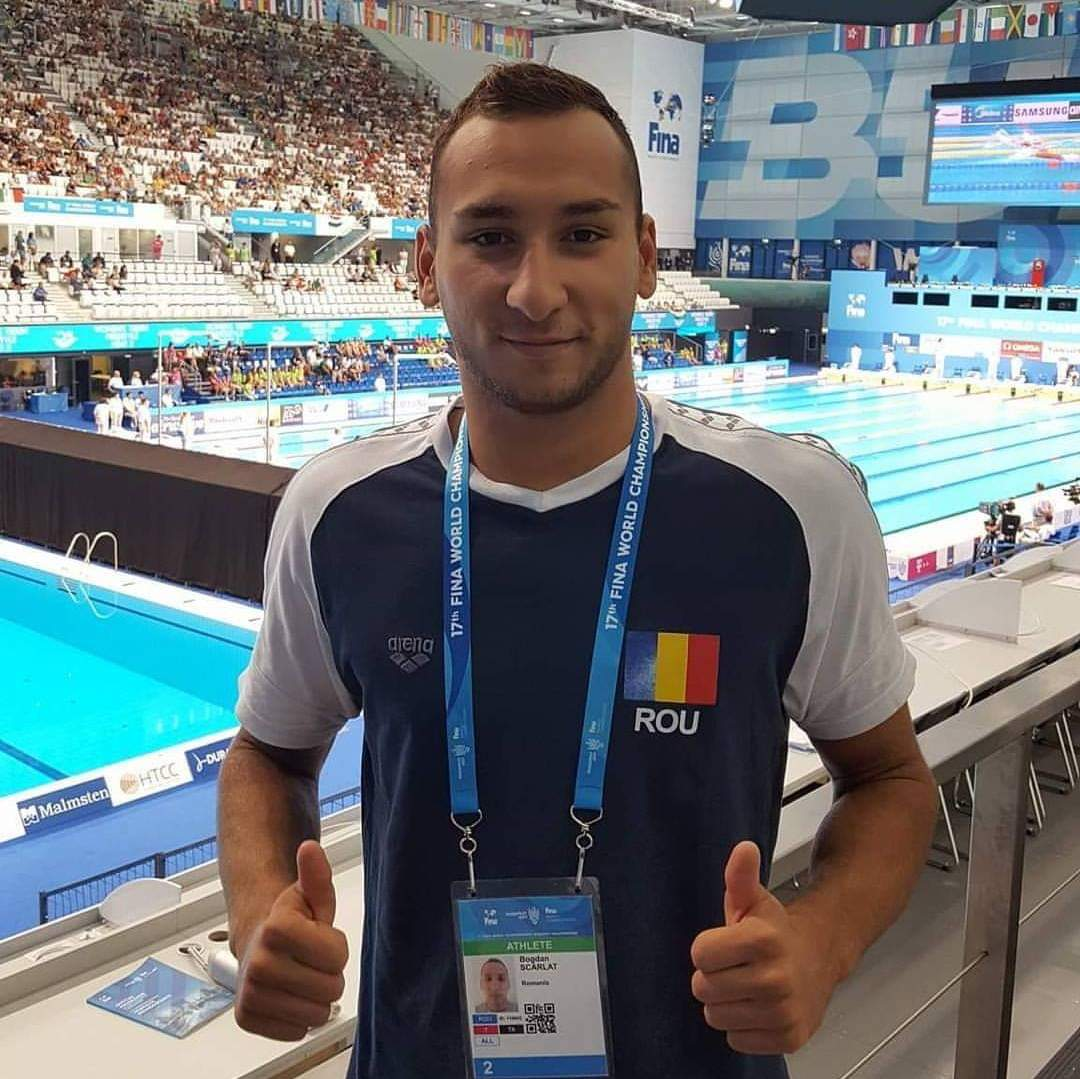
- Bogdan Scarlat in 2017

Personal information
- Born: 8 October 1997 (age 28)

Sport
- Sport: Swimming

Bogdan Scarlat (born 8 October 1997) is a Romanian swimmer. He competed in the men's 1500 metre freestyle event at the 2017 World Aquatics Championships.
