= Guilherme Pina =

Portuguese swimmer

Personal information
- Born: 21 July 1998 (age 27)

Sport
- Sport: Swimming

Guilherme Pina (born 21 July 1998) is a Portuguese swimmer. He competed in the men's 1500 metre freestyle event at the 2017 World Aquatics Championships.
