= Gabriele Detti =

Italian swimmer (born 1994)

Personal information
- National team: Italy
- Born: 29 August 1994 (age 32) Livorno, Italy
- Height: 1.84 m (6 ft 0 in)
- Weight: 79 kg (174 lb)

Sport
- Sport: Swimming
- Strokes: Freestyle
- Coach: Stefano Morini
Medal record
Men's swimming
Representing Italy
Event	1st	2nd	3rd
Olympic Games	0	0	2
World Championships (LC)	1	0	2
World Championships (SC)	0	0	1
European Championships (LC)	1	3	4
European Championships (SC)	0	2	3
Total	2	5	12
Olympic Games
Bronze medal – third place	2016 Rio de Janeiro	400 m freestyle
Bronze medal – third place	2016 Rio de Janeiro	1500 m freestyle
World Championships (LC)
Gold medal – first place	2017 Budapest	800 m freestyle
Bronze medal – third place	2017 Budapest	400 m freestyle
Bronze medal – third place	2019 Gwangju	400 m freestyle
World Championships (SC)
Bronze medal – third place	2018 Hangzhou	400 m freestyle
European Championships (LC)
Gold medal – first place	2016 London	400 m freestyle
Silver medal – second place	2016 London	800 m freestyle
Silver medal – second place	2016 London	1500 m freestyle
Silver medal – second place	2022 Rome	4×200 m freestyle
Bronze medal – third place	2014 Berlin	800 m freestyle
Bronze medal – third place	2014 Berlin	1500 m freestyle
Bronze medal – third place	2016 London	4x200 m freestyle
Bronze medal – third place	2020 Budapest	800 m freestyle
European Championships (SC)
Silver medal – second place	2012 Chartres	400 m freestyle
Silver medal – second place	2015 Netanya	1500 m freestyle
Bronze medal – third place	2013 Herning	1500 m freestyle
Bronze medal – third place	2015 Netanya	400 m freestyle
Bronze medal – third place	2019 Glasgow	400 m freestyle
European Junior Championships
Silver medal – second place	2011 Belgrade	400 m freestyle
Silver medal – second place	2011 Belgrade	800 m freestyle
Silver medal – second place	2011 Belgrade	1500 m freestyle

Gabriele Detti (born 29 August 1994) is an Italian former competitive swimmer, who is a two-time Olympic medalist and the 2017 world champion of the 800 m freestyle. He competed at the 2012, 2016, and 2020 Summer Olympics.

== Career highlights ==
At the 2012 Summer Olympics, Detti competed in the men's 1500 metre freestyle, finishing in 13th place overall in the heats, failing to qualify for the final. At the 2016 Summer Olympics, he won a bronze medal in the men's 400 metre freestyle as well as a bronze medal in the men's 1500 metre freestyle, race won by teammate Gregorio Paltrinieri.

At the 2017 World Aquatics Championships in Budapest, Detti won the bronze medal in the 400 m. Later he won the gold medal in the 800 m, becoming the world champion in the distance and setting the new European record in a time of 7:40.77. Two years later Detti confirmed his bronze medal in the 400 m freestyle in Gwangju 2019, sharing the podium with Sun Yang and Mack Horton, as already happened in Rio and in Budapest.

== Personal bests (LC) ==
Event	Time	Meet	Note(s)
200 m freestyle	1:46.38	2017 Italian Championships	
400 m freestyle	3:43.23	2019 World Aquatics Championships	NR
800 m freestyle	7:40.77	2017 World Aquatics Championships	former ER
1500 m freestyle	14:40.86	2016 Summer Olympics	
