= Serhiy Fesenko =

Ukrainian swimmer (born 1982)

Sergiy Fesenko Jr
Personal information
- Full name: Сергій Фесенко
- Nationality: Ukraine
- Born: June 5, 1982 (age 44) Kiev, Ukrainian SSR, Soviet Union
- Height: 6 ft 3 in (191 cm)
- Weight: 172 lb (78 kg)

Sport
- Sport: Swimming
- Strokes: Freestyle
- College team: Indiana Hoosiers
Medal record
Summer Universiade
Silver medal – second place	2007 Bangkok	1500m Freestyle
Bronze medal – third place	2007 Bangkok	800m Freestyle

Sergey Fesenko Jr. (also spelled as Sergiy or Serhiy, born June 5, 1982) is a long-distance freestyle swimmer from Ukraine. He competed in the 2000 Olympic Games in Sydney, Australia, 2004 Olympic Games in Athens, Greece and qualified to represent his country at the 2008 Olympic Games in Beijing, China. His father, Sergey Fesenko, Sr., won the gold medal in the 200m butterfly at the 1980 Olympic Games in Moscow.

Fesenko is a citizen of the United States and As of 2018 resided in Indiana. He has a Masters (from IU) in Economic Sciences. He served in the Ukrainian military in an Air Defense unit but did not see combat.

As of 2024, Fesenko still resides in the United States. Although he has left the country to visit his home of Ukraine many times. It is not known if he has been in active combat, but it is safe to assume he has received incoming fire from Russian forces on these trips. Ever since the conflict in Ukraine has begun he has always been supportive and often seeks out equipment and supplies to send to Ukraine in aiding the war effort. His local community is also very supportive and he often receives items from said community, mostly for free. Fesenko will send the supplies to Ukraine usually out of his own pocket. He makes no money on his transactions and often has a net loss from the shipping costs. He has helped supply everything from military style equipment and drones to clothing and medical supplies.

== Titles ==
=== Fina World Cup ===
- Berlin 2003: 400m freestyle
- New York 2004: 1500m freestyle
- New York 2004: 400m freestyle
