= Henning Mühlleitner =

German swimmer (born 1997)

Personal information
- Nationality: German
- Born: 15 July 1997 (age 28) Emmendingen, Germany

Sport
- Sport: Swimming
- Strokes: Freestyle
Medal record
European Championships (LC)
Gold medal – first place	2018 Glasgow	4×200 m mixed freestyle
Bronze medal – third place	2018 Glasgow	400 m freestyle
Bronze medal – third place	2022 Rome	400 m freestyle

Henning Mühlleitner (born 15 July 1997) is a German swimmer. He competed in the men's 400 metre freestyle event at the 2018 European Aquatics Championships, winning the bronze medal and a gold medal in the 4 × 200 m mixed freestyle relay. The 2020 Tokyo Olympian placed 4th in the men's 400 metre freestyle. At the 2022 European Aquatics Championships, Henning went on to achieve a bronze medal in the men's 400 metre freestyle. He trains with his club coach, Matt Magee, at ONEflow Aquatics in Neckarsulm, Germany.
