= Gergely Gyurta =

Hungarian swimmer (born 1991)

Personal information
- Nationality: Hungary
- Born: 21 September 1991 (age 34) Budapest, Hungary

Sport
- Sport: Swimming
- Strokes: Freestyle, individual medley
- Club: Sport+ SE; A Jövő SC ( –2012); Újpesti TE (2013– )
- Coach: Ferenc Kovácshegyi
Medal record
Representing Hungary
World Championships (SC)
Bronze medal – third place	2010 Dubai	1500 m freestyle
European Championships (LC)
Bronze medal – third place	2012 Debrecen	1500 m freestyle
European Championships (SC)
Gold medal – first place	2013 Herning	1500 m freestyle
Bronze medal – third place	2017 Copenhagen	400 m medley
Universiade
Bronze medal – third place	2017 Taipei	1500 m freestyle
European Junior Championships (LC)
Gold medal – first place	2009 Prague	1500 m freestyle
Silver medal – second place	2009 Prague	400 m medley

Gergely Gyurta (born 21 September 1991) is a Hungarian swimmer and a member of the national team representing his country. He has participated in three Olympic Games and has earned medals at both the World and European levels. His older brother, Dániel Gyurta, is also an Olympic swimmer who specializes in breaststroke events.

== Career ==
In 2010, he won his first senior international medal, winning the bronze medal in the men's 1500 m freestyle at the 2010 Short Course World Championships.

At the 2012 Summer Olympics, he competed in the Men's 1500 metre freestyle, finishing in 12th place overall in the heats. That year, he won bronze at the European Championships.

Additionally, Gergely became the 2013 European short course champion in the 1500 metre freestyle. In 2014, he set the Hungarian record in that event.

At the 2016 Summer Olympics, Gyurta competed in the 400 m and 1500 m freestyle events, finishing in 11th and 9th respectively.

He won the bronze medal in the 400 m medley at the 2017 European Short Course Championships.

In 2018, he set the Hungarian record in the 800 m freestyle at the Hungarian National Championships.

He finished in 15th place in the 1500 m freestyle at the 2020 Olympics.

=== International Swimming League ===
In 2019 he was member of the 2019 International Swimming League representing Team Iron.
