= Damien Joly =

French swimmer (born 1992)

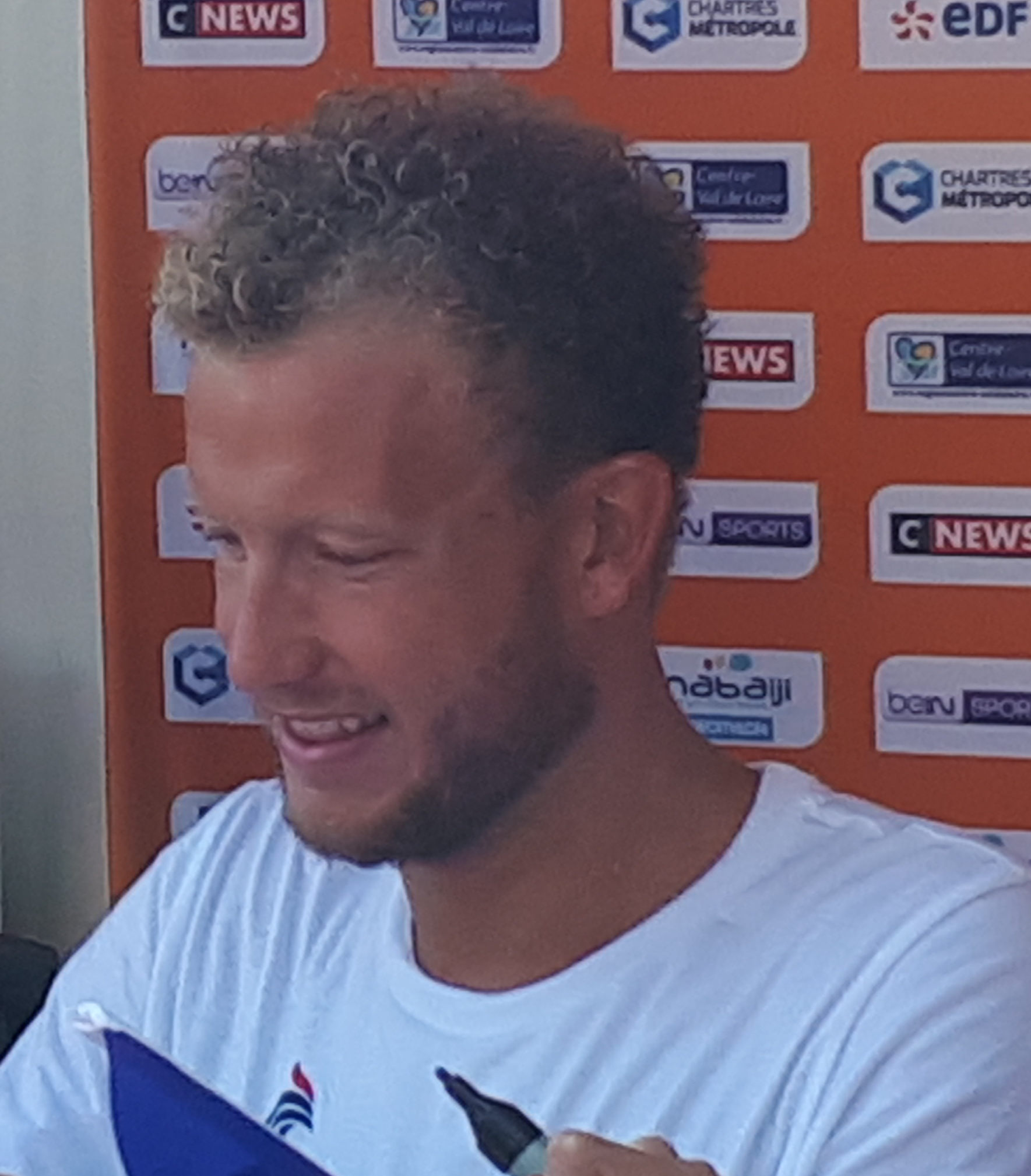
- Damien Joly in 2018

Personal information
- Nationality: French
- Born: 4 June 1992 (age 34) Ollioules, France

Sport
- Sport: Swimming
- Strokes: Freestyle
Medal record
Men's swimming
Representing France
World Championships (SC)
Silver medal – second place	2022 Melbourne	1500 m freestyle
European Championships (LC)
Bronze medal – third place	2022 Rome	1500 m freestyle

Damien Joly (born 4 June 1992 in Ollioules) is a French swimmer. At the 2012 Summer Olympics, he competed in the men's 1500 metre freestyle, finishing in 14th place overall in the heats, failing to qualify for the final.
