= Ilya Druzhinin =

Russian swimmer (born 1998)

Personal information
- Born: 23 April 1998 (age 28) Volgograd, Russia

Sport
- Sport: Swimming

Ilya Andreyevich Druzhinin (Russian: Илья Андреевич Дружинин; born 23 April 1998) is a Russian swimmer. He competed in the men's 1500 metre freestyle event at the 2016 Summer Olympics.
