= David Aubry =

French swimmer

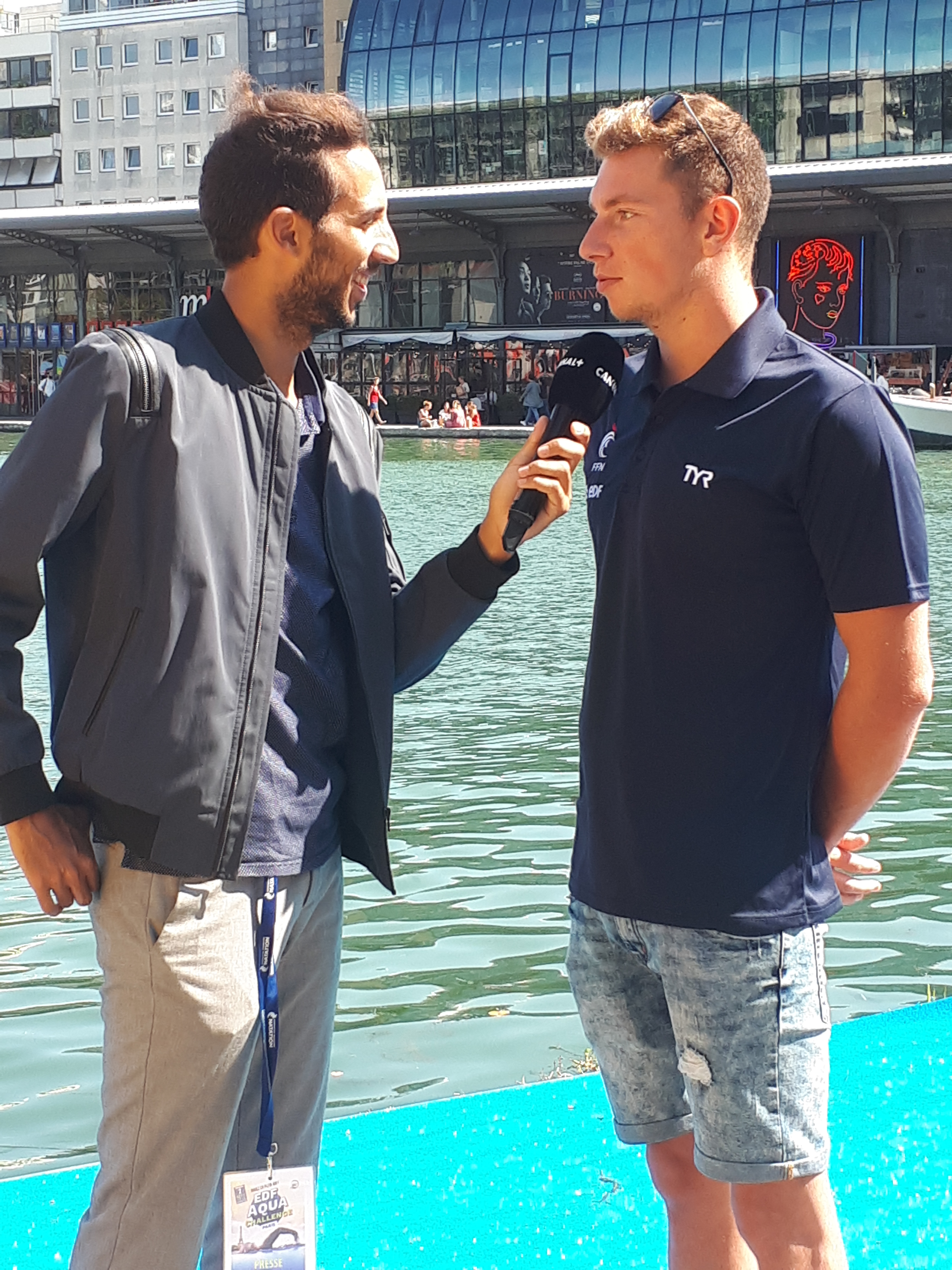

Personal information
- Nationality: French
- Born: 8 November 1996 (age 29) Saint-Germain-en-Laye, France

Sport
- Sport: Swimming
- Strokes: Freestyle
- Club: Montpellier Mediterranee Metropole UC Natation
Medal record
Men's swimming
Representing France
World Championships (LC)
Bronze medal – third place	2019 Gwangju	800 m freestyle
Bronze medal – third place	2024 Doha	1500 m freestyle
European Championships (LC)
Bronze medal – third place	2018 Glasgow	Open water team
European Championships (SC)
Silver medal – second place	2023 Otopeni	800 m freestyle
Silver medal – second place	2023 Otopeni	1500 m freestyle
Bronze medal – third place	2019 Glasgow	1500 m freestyle

David Aubry (born 8 November 1996) is a French swimmer. He competes in short-course and long-course pool swimming as well as open water swimming.

== Career ==
He competed in the open water Team event at the 2018 European Aquatics Championships, winning the bronze medal.

He competed at his first World Championships in 2019 in Gwangju, South Korea, where he won bronze in the men's 800 m freestyle.

Following his success in 2019, he suffered a shoulder injury which caused him to experience depression and a lack of motivation.

He competed in the 400 and 800 metres at the 2020 Summer Olympics but failed to progress beyond the heats in either distance. He also qualified to represent France in open water swimming at the 2020 Summer Olympics but was one of two swimmers not to finish.

He competed at the 2023 World Championships in Fukuoka, Japan. He made the final of the 1500 metres freestyle. He was second in the 800 and 1500 metres freestyle at 2023 European Short Course Championships.

He won a second World Championship medal at the 2024 Doha edition. He finished third in the 1500 metres freestyle behind Daniel Wiffen and Florian Wellbrock.
