= Domenico Acerenza =

Italian open water swimmer

Personal information
- Nationality: Italian
- Born: 19 January 1995 (age 31) Potenza, Italy

Sport
- Country: Italy
- Sport: Open water swimming, pool swimming
- Event(s): 5 km, 10 km, 1500 m
- Club: Gruppo Sportivo Fiamme Oro
Medal record
Men's swimming
Representing Italy
World Championships
Gold medal – first place	2023 Fukuoka	Team event
Silver medal – second place	2019 Gwangju	Team event
Silver medal – second place	2022 Budapest	10 km open water
Silver medal – second place	2024 Doha	Team event
Bronze medal – third place	2022 Budapest	Team event
Bronze medal – third place	2023 Fukuoka	5 km open water
Bronze medal – third place	2024 Doha	5 km open water
European Championships
Gold medal – first place	2020 Budapest	Team relay
Gold medal – first place	2022 Rome	10 km open water
Gold medal – first place	2022 Rome	Team relay
Silver medal – second place	2022 Rome	5 km open water
Bronze medal – third place	2020 Budapest	1500 m freestyle
Mediterranean Games
Silver medal – second place	2018 Tarragona	400 m freestyle
Silver medal – second place	2018 Tarragona	1500 m freestyle

Domenico Acerenza (Italian pronunciation: [doˈmeːniko atʃeˈrɛntsa]; born 19 January 1995) is an Italian open water swimmer and pool swimmer. He is the 2022 European Aquatics Championships gold medalist in the 10 kilometre open water swim and the 2022 World Aquatics Championships silver medalist in the 10 kilometre open water swim. At the 2020 Summer Olympics, he placed ninth in the 1500 metre freestyle.

== Career ==
=== 2019–2021 ===
At the 2019 World Aquatics Championships, Acerenza won a silver medal in the 5 kilometre mixed team event. He competed at the 2020 Summer Olympics in the 1500 metre freestyle, placing ninth.

In December 2021, Acerenza swam a personal best time of 1:48.12.0 in the 10 kilometer open water swim to win the silver medal in the event as part of the Abu Dhabi Aquatics Festival, finishing within three seconds of gold medalist Florian Wellbrock. Earlier in the competition, Acerenza competed in the first-ever 4×1500 metre mixed open water relay, helping to win the gold medal.

=== 2022 ===
At the 2022 Marathon Swim World Series stop held in Setúbal, Portugal at Albarquel in May, Acerenza won the silver medal in the 10 kilometre open water swim, finishing approximately two seconds behind gold medal-winner Gregorio Paltrinieri, also of Italy.

In June 2022, he won a silver medal in the 10 kilometre open water swim at the 2022 World Aquatics Championships in Budapest, Hungary, finishing just 1.4 seconds behind Gregorio Paltrinieri with a time of 1:50:58.2. Earlier in the Championships, he won a bronze medal as part of the open water 6 kilometre team relay. Two months later, at the 2022 European Aquatics Championships, held in Rome, he won the silver medal in the 5 kilometre open water swim with a time of 52:14.2. The following day, he won the gold medal in the 10 kilometre open water swim, finishing over three seconds ahead of silver medalist Marc-Antoine Olivier of France with a time of 1:50:33.6. In the mixed team relay later in the day, he won a second gold medal, helping achieve a first-place finish in 59:43.1.

On 27 August, at the leg of the 2022 Marathon Swim World Series held in Lake Mégantic in Lac-Mégantic, Canada, Acerenza climbed in overall rank for the World Series to fourth with his gold medal-win in the 10 kilometre open water swim with a time of 1:50:50.83.

Three months later, in November at the final leg of the 2022 World Series, held in Eilat, Israel, Acerenza started off on day one with a fourth-place finish in the 4×1500 metre mixed open water relay, contributing to a final time of 1:06:39.50. Heading into the final leg, he was the second-highest ranking male Italian competitor overall with a score of 1500 points. The following day, he placed fifth in the 10 kilometre open water swim, finishing in a time of 1:46:45.50, which was 1.30 second behind bronze medalist Dávid Betlehem of Hungary. For his performances across the whole 2022 World Series, he ranked as the fourth highest-scoring male competitor with a total of 2000 points.

=== 2023 ===
For the leg of the 2023 FINA Open Water Tour conducted in Golfo Aranci in May, Acerenza placed second overall in the 10 kilometre open water swim behind Kristóf Rasovszky of Hungary with a time of 1:47:20.10.
