= Henrik Christiansen (swimmer) =

Norwegian swimmer (born 1996)

Personal information
- Nickname: Olympic Muffin Man
- Born: 9 October 1996 (age 30) Lørenskog, Norway
- Height: 1.91 m (6 ft 3 in)

Sport
- Sport: Swimming
- Strokes: Freestyle
Medal record
Men's swimming
Representing Norway
World Championships
Silver medal – second place	2019 Gwangju	800 m freestyle
World Championships (SC)
Silver medal – second place	2018 Hangzhou	400 m freestyle
Silver medal – second place	2022 Melbourne	800 m freestyle
Bronze medal – third place	2018 Hangzhou	1500 m freestyle
Bronze medal – third place	2022 Melbourne	1500 m freestyle
European Championships (LC)
Silver medal – second place	2016 London	400 m freestyle
Silver medal – second place	2018 Glasgow	400 m freestyle
European Championships (SC)
Silver medal – second place	2019 Glasgow	1500 m freestyle
Bronze medal – third place	2015 Netanya	1500 m freestyle
Bronze medal – third place	2017 Copenhagen	400 m freestyle
Bronze medal – third place	2017 Copenhagen	1500 m freestyle
European Junior Championships
Silver medal – second place	2014 Dordrecht	400 m freestyle
Bronze medal – third place	2014 Dordrecht	800 m freestyle
Bronze medal – third place	2014 Dordrecht	1500 m freestyle

Henrik Christiansen (born 9 October 1996) is a Norwegian swimmer. He is a World Championships silver medalist, two-time World Championships (25m) silver and bronze medalist, two-time European Championships silver medalist, and European Short Course Championships silver and two-time bronze medalist. Christiansen is a three-time Olympian and competed at the 2016, 2020 and 2024 Summer Olympics. He holds the Norwegian national record in 400 m, 800 m and 1500 m freestyle in both long course and short course, and short course 4×200m freestyle relay.

== Career ==
=== 2014 ===
Christiansen won three medals at the 2014 European Junior Swimming Championships.

=== 2015 ===
He also competed at the 2015 World Aquatics Championships.

=== 2016 ===
He won a silver medal at the 2016 European Aquatics Championships in the 400 metre freestyle.

He turned down swimming scholarship offers from Stanford University and UC Berkeley to continue his training in Norway.

At the 2016 Summer Olympics, he was a finalist in the 1500m freestyle, placing 8th. He also competed in the 400m freestyle.

=== International Swimming League ===
In 2019, he was a member of the 2019 International Swimming League representing Team Iron. He won the 400 m freestyle in London.

=== 2021 ===
At the 2020 Summer Olympics, he competed in the 400m freestyle, 800m freestyle and 1500m freestyle.

=== 2024 Summer Olympics ===
At the 2024 Summer Olympics, Christiansen placed 25th in the 800m freestyle, 20th in the 1500m freestyle, and 25th in the 10km Marathon Swim.

== Personal life ==
Christiansen went viral on TikTok during the 2024 Summer Olympics for several videos he posted about his love of the chocolate muffins served at the Olympic dining hall and was nicknamed the "Olympic Muffin Man."

== Records ==
He holds multiple national swimming records.
