= Serhiy Frolov =

Ukrainian swimmer (born 1992)

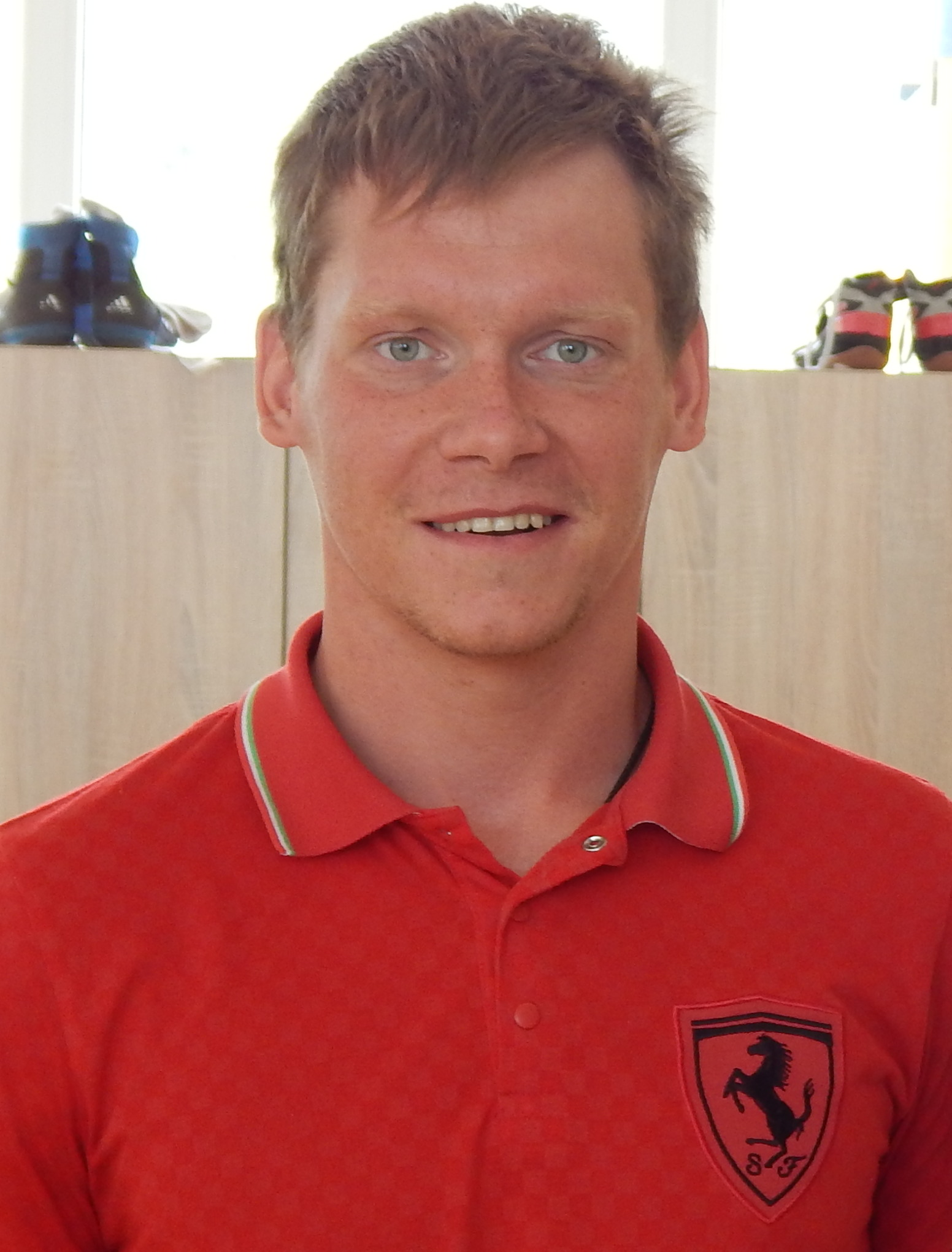

Personal information
- Nationality: Ukrainian
- Born: 14 April 1992 (age 34) Zaporizhzhya, Ukraine
- Height: 1.90 m (6 ft 3 in)
- Weight: 84 kg (185 lb)

Sport
- Sport: Swimming
- Strokes: Freestyle
Medal record
Men's swimming
Representing Ukraine
European Championships
Bronze medal – third place	2012 Debrecen	800 m freestyle
European Championships (SC)
Silver medal – second place	2010 Eindhoven	1500 m freestyle
Silver medal – second place	2012 Chartres	1500 m freestyle
Bronze medal – third place	2011 Szczecin	1500 m freestyle
Summer Universiade
Gold medal – first place	2015 Gwangju	800 m freestyle
Silver medal – second place	2013 Kazan	800 m freestyle
Silver medal – second place	2015 Gwangju	1500 m freestyle
Bronze medal – third place	2011 Shenzhen	1500 m freestyle
Bronze medal – third place	2013 Kazan	1500 m freestyle
Bronze medal – third place	2017 Taipei	800 m freestyle
Military World Games
Gold medal – first place	2019 Wuhan	1500 m freestyle
Silver medal – second place	2019 Wuhan	800 m freestyle
Bronze medal – third place	2019 Wuhan	400 m freestyle

Serhiy Frolov (Ukrainian: Сергій Фролов; born 14 April 1992 in Zaporizhia, Ukraine) is a Ukrainian swimmer.

== Career ==
He has won several international juniors medals in his career and a silver medal at the 1500 meter freestyle during the 2010 European Short Course Swimming Championships. At the 2012 Summer Olympics, he competed in the Men's 400 metre freestyle, finishing in 17th place in the heats, failing to reach the final. That year, he also won bronze in the European 50 m championships in the 800 m freestyle.

At the 2016 Summer Olympics, he competed in the 1500 m freestyle.

At the 2020 Summer Olympics, he competed in the 800 and 1500 m freestyle events. He reached the final in the 800 m.
