= Victor Johansson =

Swedish swimmer (born 1998)

Personal information
- Nationality: Swedish
- Born: 13 September 1998 (age 27) Nässjö, Sweden

Sport
- Sport: Swimming
- Strokes: Freestyle
- College team: University of Alabama (2022–2023); University of Southern California (2018–2022)
Medal record
Men's swimming
Representing Sweden
Universiade
| Gold medal – first place | 2019 Naples | 1500 m freestyle |
European Junior Championships
| Gold medal – first place | 2016 Hódmezővásárhely | 800 m freestyle |
| Silver medal – second place | 2016 Hódmezővásárhely | 400 m freestyle |
| Bronze medal – third place | 2016 Hódmezővásárhely | 1500 m freestyle |

Victor Johansson (born 13 September 1998) is a Swedish swimmer. He competed in the men's 200 metre freestyle event at the 2017 World Aquatics Championships. In 2019, he represented Sweden at the 2019 Summer Universiade in Naples, Italy and he won the gold medal in the men's 1500 metre freestyle event.
