= Jan Micka =

Czech swimmer

Personal information
- Nationality: Czech Republic
- Born: 15 January 1995 (age 31) Prague, Czech Republic
- Height: 1.83 m (6 ft 0 in)
- Weight: 73 kg (161 lb)

Sport
- Sport: Swimming
- Strokes: Freestyle
- Club: USK Praha
- Coach: Jaroslava Passerova

Jan Micka (Czech pronunciation: [ˈjan ˈmɪtska]; born 15 January 1995 in Prague) is a Czech swimmer, who specialized in long-distance freestyle events. He is a two-time Czech record holder in the 800 and 1500 m freestyle. Micka is a member of the swimming team for USK Praha, and is coached and trained by Jaroslava Passerova.

Micka qualified for the men's 1500 m freestyle, as Czech Republic's youngest swimmer (aged 17), at the 2012 Summer Olympics in London, by eclipsing a FINA B-standard entry time of 15:28.49 from the European Junior Championships in Antwerp, Belgium. He challenged six other swimmers on the first heat, including two-time Olympian Ediz Yıldırımer of Turkey. Micka edged out Iceland's Anton Sveinn McKee to take a second spot by six hundredths of a second (0.06) in 15:29.34. Micka failed to advance into the final, as he placed twenty-fourth overall in the preliminaries.
