= Swimming at the 2026 European Aquatics Championships – Men's 400 metre freestyle =

Men's 400 metre freestyle at the 2026 European Aquatics Championships
- Venue: Paris Aquatic Centre
- Dates: 16 August
- Competitors: 55 from 30 nations
- Winning time: 3:43.14

Medalists
gold medal	Léon Marchand	France
silver medal	Olivér Pápai	Hungary
bronze medal	Lukas Märtens	Germany

The Men's 400 metre freestyle competition of the 2026 European Aquatics Championships was held on 16 August 2026.

== Records ==
Prior to the competition, the existing world, European and championship records were as follows.

	Time	Swimmer	Location	Date
World record	3:39.96	Lukas Maertens (GER)	Stockholm	12 April 2025
European record	3:39.96	Lukas Maertens (GER)	Stockholm	12 April 2025
Championship record	3:42.50	Lukas Maertens (GER)	Rome	17 August 2022

== Results ==
=== Heats ===
The heats were started on 16 August at 09:55.
Qualification Rules:The 8 fastest from the heats qualify to the finals

Rank	Heat	Lane	Swimmer	Country	Time	Notes
1	6	4	Oliver Klemet	Germany	3:45.22	Q
2	5	6	Olivér Pápai	Hungary	3:45.32	Q
3	7	6	Lucas Henveaux	Belgium	3:45.78	Q
4	7	2	Léon Marchand	France	3:45.85	Q
5	6	6	Victor Johansson	Sweden	3:46.14	Q
6	6	1	Zalán Sárkány	Hungary	3:46.17	Q
7	7	3	Petar Mitsin	Bulgaria	3:46.28	Q
8	7	4	Lukas Märtens	Germany	3:46.33	Q
9	6	7	Sven Schwarz	Germany	3:46.68	
10	5	1	Sauveur Cristofini	France	3:46.98	
11	6	3	Johannes Liebmann	Germany	3:47.58	
12	7	5	Antonio Djakovic	Switzerland	3:47.86	
13	5	5	Carlos Garach	Spain	3:47.96	
14	5	4	Dimitrios Markos	Greece	3:48.10	
15	6	0	Luca De Tullio	Italy	3:48.13	
16	6	0	Tyler Melbourne-Smith	Great Britain	3:48.57	
17	6	5	James Guy	Great Britain	3:48.68	
18	7	7	Grigorii Vekovishchev	Neutral Athletes B	3:48.90	
19	7	8	Alessandro Ragaini	Italy	3:49.11	
20	5	2	Christian Giefing	Austria	3:49.14	
21	7	1	Jack McMillan	Great Britain	3:49.29	
22	5	8	Franko Grgić	Croatia	3:49.51	
23	6	2	Marco De Tullio	Italy	3:49.52	
24	5	3	Davide Marchello	Italy	3:50.39	
25	4	5	Vasileios Kakoulakis	Greece	3:50.94	
26	4	7	Jovan Lekić	Bosnia and Herzegovina	3:52.01	
27	5	7	Romano Yoav	Israel	3:52.43	
28	3	5	Samuel Košťál	Slovakia	3:53.24	
29	3	1	Nikola Simić	Serbia	3:53.51	
30	5	0	Sašo Boškan	Slovenia	3:53.64	
31	4	4	Nathan Wiffen	Ireland	3:53.82	
32	7	9	Tomas Koski	Finland	3:54.66	
33	3	2	Mattia Mauri	Switzerland	3:55.36	
34	3	4	Líggjas Joensen	Faroe Islands	3:55.78	
35	4	2	Henrik Christiansen	Norway	3:55.90	
36	6	9	Krzysztof Chmielewski	Poland	3:56.12	
37	4	1	Eric Andrieș	Romania	3:56.13	
38	3	3	Victor Sandrup	Sweden	3:56.27	
39	3	8	Denis O'Brien	Ireland	3:56.93	
40	3	9	Jan Jurčík	Czech Republic	3:57.35	
41	5	9	Milan Vojtko	Slovakia	3:57.93	
42	4	0	Cormac Rynn	Ireland	3:58.01	
43	2	3	Biel Cuen	Andorra	3:58.43	
44	2	6	Michal Judickij	Czech Republic	3:58.52	
45	3	6	Niko Janković	Croatia	3:59.35	
46	2	5	Tobias Moen Olsen	Norway	4:00.31	
47	2	2	Filip Kuruzović	Bosnia and Herzegovina	4:00.57	
48	3	7	Karlo Perčinić	Croatia	4:00.73	
49	2	4	Nikola Gjuretanovikj	North Macedonia	4:04.05	
50	2	1	Donats Dragasjus	Latvia	4:04.39	
51	1	3	Eetu Autio	Finland	4:06.50	
52	3	0	Kevin Teixeira	Andorra	4:07.38	
53	2	8	Heini Mohr Askham	Faroe Islands	4:10.62	
54	1	4	Silas Dam Lindberg	Faroe Islands	4:13.49	
55	1	5	Edlijano Huna	Albania	4:14.80	
	2	7	Danas Rapšys	Lithuania	Did not start	
	4	3	Kristupas Trepočka	Lithuania	Did not start	
	4	6	Robin Hanson	Sweden	Did not start	
	4	8	Konstantinos Englezakis	Greece	Did not start	
	4	9	Miroslav Terziev	Bulgaria	Did not start	
	6	8	Daniel Wiffen	Ireland	Did not start	

=== Final ===
The final was held on the evening of 16 August.

Rank	Lane	Name	Nationality	Time	Notes
1st place, gold medalist(s)	6	Léon Marchand	France	3:43.14	NR
2nd place, silver medalist(s)	5	Olivér Pápai	Hungary	3:44.46	
3rd place, bronze medalist(s)	8	Lukas Märtens	Germany	3:44.57	
4	3	Lucas Henveaux	Belgium	3:44.64	
5	4	Oliver Klemet	Germany	3:45.16	
6	7	Zalán Sárkány	Hungary	3:46.99	
7	2	Victor Johansson	Sweden	3:47.19	
8	1	Petar Mitsin	Bulgaria	3:47.42	
