= 2024 World Aquatics Swimming Championships (25 m) – Men's 1500 metre freestyle =

Swimming competition

Men's 1500 metre freestyle at the 2024 World Aquatics Swimming Championships (25 m)
- Venue: Duna Arena
- Location: Budapest, Hungary
- Dates: 10 December
- Competitors: 26 from 24 nations
- Winning time: 14:16.40

Medalists
gold medal	Ahmed Jaouadi	Tunisia
silver medal	Florian Wellbrock	Germany
bronze medal	Kuzey Tunçelli	Turkey

The men's 1500 metre freestyle event at the 2024 World Aquatics Swimming Championships (25 m) was held on 10 December 2024 at the Duna Arena in Budapest, Hungary.

== Records ==
Prior to the competition, the existing world and championship records were as follows.

World record	Florian Wellbrock (GER)	14:06.88	Abu Dhabi, United Arab Emirates	21 December 2021
Competition record	Florian Wellbrock (GER)	14:06.88	Abu Dhabi, United Arab Emirates	21 December 2021

== Background ==
Florian Wellbrock of Germany headlined the men’s 1500 metre freestyle field as the world record holder, having set a mark of 14:06.88 in 2021. Since then, his fastest time was 14:25.41 from 2022, leaving questions about his current form. France’s Damien Joly, silver medalist at the 2022 Short Course World Championships, entered with a national record of 14:19.62 and made the Olympic final in Paris. Hungary's Zalán Sárkány (14:23.31), along with Tunisia’s Ahmed Jaouadi (14:24.68), posted competitive times over the previous year. Both were Olympic finalists in Paris. Seventeen-year-olds Kuzey Tunçelli (14:38.61) and Kazushi Imafuku (14:36.32), from Turkey and Japan, respectively, also featured. Imafuku won the 1500 m at the Singapore World Cup. Other entries included Sven Schwarz, Luca De Tullio, Victor Johansson, and Charlie Clark. Kirill Martynychev, competing as a neutral athlete, entered with a personal best of 14:25.24 set at the 2024 Russian Short Course Championships.

SwimSwam predicted Jaouadi would win, Wellbrock would come second, and Sárkány would come third.

== Results ==
The slowest heats were started at 11:45, and the fastest heat at 18:50.

Rank	Heat	Lane	Name	Nationality	Time	Notes
1st place, gold medalist(s)	3	5	Ahmed Jaouadi	Tunisia	14:16.40	
2nd place, silver medalist(s)	2	5	Florian Wellbrock	Germany	14:17.27	
3rd place, bronze medalist(s)	3	1	Kuzey Tunçelli	Turkey	14:20.64	WJ, NR
4	3	6	Damien Joly	France	14:22.12	
5	2	6	Sven Schwarz	Germany	14:22.29	
6	2	2	Luca De Tullio	Italy	14:28.44	
7	3	3	Kirill Martynychev	Neutral Athletes B	14:28.56	
8	3	4	Zalán Sárkány	Hungary	14:32.10	
9	3	8	Nathan Wiffen	Ireland	14:32.65	
10	3	2	Victor Johansson	Sweden	14:34.27	NR
11	2	8	Daniel Matheson	United States	14:37.56	
12	2	3	Andrei Proca	Romania	14:39.42	
13	2	4	Charlie Clark	United States	14:41.61	
14	3	7	Kazushi Imafuku	Japan	14:48.01	
15	2	1	Kris Mihaylov	South Africa	14:52.53	
16	2	9	Timothé Barbeau	Canada	15:02.76	
17	2	7	Chen Shengxin	China	15:04.43	
18	1	7	Mark Iltšišin	Estonia	15:06.05	
19	2	0	Muhd Dhuha Bin Zulfikry	Malaysia	15:14.66	
20	1	1	Kevin Teixeira	Andorra	15:19.02	NR
21	1	2	Diego Dulieu	Honduras	15:20.52	
22	1	6	Larn Hamblyn-Ough	New Zealand	15:20.84	
23	1	5	Marin Mogić	Croatia	15:25.18	
24	1	4	Hung Pen-han	Chinese Taipei	15:31.46	
25	1	8	Timothy Leberl	Mauritius	15:55.08	NR
26	1	3	He Shing Ip	Hong Kong	16:12.57	
