= Swimming at the 2026 European Aquatics Championships – Men's 800 metre freestyle =

Men's 800 metre freestyle at the 2026 European Aquatics Championships
- Venue: Paris Aquatic Centre
- Location: Paris
- Dates: 11 August (heats); 12 August (final)
- Competitors: 36
- Winning time: 7:37.59

Medalists
gold medal	Johannes Liebmann	Germany
silver medal	Sven Schwarz	Germany
bronze medal	Zalán Sárkány	Hungary

The Men's 800 metre freestyle competition of the 2026 European Aquatics Championships was held on 11 and 12 August 2026.

== Records ==
Prior to the competition, the existing world, European and championship records were as follows.

	Name	Nation	Time	Location	Date
World record	Zhang Lin	China	7:32.12	Rome	29 July 2009
European record	Johannes Liebmann	Germany	7:37.94	Stockholm	12 April 2026
Championship record	Gregorio Paltrinieri	Italy	7:40.86	Rome	13 August 2022

== Results ==
=== Heats ===
The heats were started on 11 August 2026 at 11:04.
Qualification Rules: The 8 fastest from the heats qualify to the final.

Rank	Heat	Lane	Swimmer	Nation	Time	Notes
1	4	4	Johannes Liebmann	Germany	7:41.87	Q
2	4	2	Zalán Sárkány	Hungary	7:42.34	Q
3	4	3	Daniel Wiffen	Ireland	7:44.86	Q
4	3	4	Sven Schwarz	Germany	7:46.93	Q
5	3	7	Dimitrios Markos	Greece	7:47.26	Q
6	3	6	Luca de Tullio	Italy	7:47.42	Q
7	3	2	Carlos Garach Benito	Spain	7:48.26	Q, NR
8	4	6	Kristof Rasovszky	Hungary	7:49.48	Q
9	4	7	Davide Marchello	Italy	7:50.09	
10	3	5	Victor Johansson	Sweden	7:50.60	
11	4	0	Lucas Henveaux	Belgium	7:51.64	
12	3	1	Andrei-Theodor Proca	Romania	7:54.26	
13	3	8	Matteo Diodato	Italy	7:55.40	
14	4	5	Oliver Klemet	Germany	7:55.75	
15	4	8	Nathan Wiffen	Ireland	7:57.08	
16	2	2	Nikola Simic	Serbia	7:58.27	
17	4	1	Vasileios Kakoulakis	Greece	7:58.65	
18	3	3	Franko Grgic	Croatia	8:00.45	
19	2	3	Dziugas Miskinis	Lithuania	8:01.12	
20	3	0	Henrik Christiansen	Norway	8:03.61	
21	2	4	Suleyman Ismayilzada	Azerbaijan	8:04.28	
22	4	9	Milan Vojtko	Slovakia	8:05.20	
23	2	7	Saso Boskan	Slovenia	8:05.41	
24	2	8	Liam Custer	Ireland	8:06.89	
25	2	6	Victor Sandrup	Sweden	8:09.76	
26	3	9	Luca Karl	Austria	8:14.49	
27	2	5	Jakub Gabriel	Slovakia	8:14.49	
28	2	0	Tobias Moen Olsen	Norway	8:18.74	
29	1	2	Filip Kuruzovic	Bosnia and Herzegovina	8:19.39	
30	1	5	Biel Cuen Sibila	Andorra	8:19.67	
31	2	9	Kevin Teixeira Pereira	Andorra	8:28.16	
32	1	4	Denis Bedzhanian	Moldova	8:28.74	
33	1	6	Stefan Vrtikapa	Bosnia and Herzegovina	8:30.27	
34	2	1	Liggjas Joensen	Faroe Islands	8:43.48	
35	1	3	Heini Mohr Askham	Faroe Islands	8:54.34	

=== Final ===
The final was held on 12 August.

Rank	Lane	Name	Nationality	Time	Notes
1st place, gold medalist(s)	4	Johannes Liebmann	Germany	7:37.59	ER, CR
2nd place, silver medalist(s)	6	Sven Schwarz	Germany	7:41.16	
3rd place, bronze medalist(s)	5	Zalán Sárkány	Hungary	7:41.75	
4	3	Daniel Wiffen	Ireland	7:43.30	
5	2	Dimitrios Markos	Greece	7:43.52	
6	7	Luca de Tullio	Italy	7:44.24	
7	1	Carlos Garach Benito	Spain	7:45.41	NR
8	8	Kristof Rasovszky	Hungary	7:51.41	
