= Swimming at the 2022 European Aquatics Championships – Men's 800 metre freestyle =

Men's 800 metre freestyle at the 2022 European Aquatics Championships
- Venue: Foro Italico
- Dates: 12 August (heats); 13 August (final)
- Competitors: 21 from 13 nations
- Winning time: 7:40.86

Medalists
gold medal	Gregorio Paltrinieri	Italy
silver medal	Lukas Märtens	Germany
bronze medal	Lorenzo Galossi	Italy

The Men's 800 metre freestyle competition of the 2022 European Aquatics Championships was held on 12 and 13 August 2022.

== Records ==
Prior to the competition, the existing world, European and championship records were as follows.

	Name	Nationality	Time	Location	Date
World record	Zhang Lin	China	7:32.12	Rome	29 July 2009
European record	Gregorio Paltrinieri	Italy	7:39.27	Gwangju	24 July 2019
Championship record	Gregorio Paltrinieri	Italy	7:42.33	London	20 May 2016

The following new records were set during this competition.

Date	Event	Name	Nationality	Time	Record
13 August	Final	Gregorio Paltrinieri	Italy	7:40.86	CR

== Results ==
=== Heats ===
The heats were started on 12 August at 10:08.

Rank	Heat	Lane	Name	Nationality	Time	Notes
1	3	4	Mykhailo Romanchuk	Ukraine	7:47.93	Q
2	3	5	Lukas Märtens	Germany	7:48.38	Q
3	2	4	Gregorio Paltrinieri	Italy	7:48.91	Q
4	3	3	Lorenzo Galossi	Italy	7:49.08	Q
5	3	6	Damien Joly	France	7:49.17	Q
6	2	3	Sven Schwarz	Germany	7:49.30	Q
7	2	5	Gabriele Detti	Italy	7:49.93	
8	3	7	Luca De Tullio	Italy	7:51.60	
9	3	1	Joris Bouchaut	France	7:51.63	Q
10	2	2	Victor Johansson	Sweden	7:52.48	Q
11	2	1	Dimitrios Markos	Greece	7:52.60	
12	2	6	Henrik Christiansen	Norway	7:53.82	
13	3	2	Oliver Klemet	Germany	7:59.24	
14	2	0	Carlos Garach	Spain	7:59.31	
15	3	0	Krzysztof Chmielewski	Poland	7:59.50	
16	2	8	Kieran Bird	Great Britain	8:04.48	
17	3	8	Bar Soloveychik	Israel	8:05.71	
18	1	5	Yoav Romano	Israel	8:11.02	
19	1	4	Liam Custer	Ireland	8:15.09	
20	3	9	Yordan Yanchev	Bulgaria	8:15.39	
21	2	7	Jon Jøntvedt	Norway	8:20.88	
	1	3	Franc Aleksi	Albania	Did not start	

=== Final ===
The final was held on 13 August at 19:37.

Rank	Lane	Name	Nationality	Time	Notes
1st place, gold medalist(s)	3	Gregorio Paltrinieri	Italy	7:40.86	CR
2nd place, silver medalist(s)	5	Lukas Märtens	Germany	7:42.65	
3rd place, bronze medalist(s)	6	Lorenzo Galossi	Italy	7:43.37	WJ
4	4	Mykhailo Romanchuk	Ukraine	7:45.03	
5	7	Sven Schwarz	Germany	7:47.36	
6	2	Damien Joly	France	7:48.82	
7	1	Joris Bouchaut	France	7:50.69	
8	8	Victor Johansson	Sweden	7:54.51	
