= Swimming at the 2026 European Aquatics Championships – Men's 1500 metre freestyle =

Men's 1500 metre freestyle at the 2026 European Aquatics Championships
- Venue: Paris Aquatic Centre
- Dates: 14 August (heats); 15 August (final)
- Competitors: 25 from 16 nations
- Winning time: 14:26.79

Medalists
gold medal	Johannes Liebmann	Germany
silver medal	Zalán Sárkány	Hungary
bronze medal	Oliver Klemet	Germany

The Men's 1500 metre freestyle competition of the 2026 European Aquatics Championships was held on 14 and 15 August 2026.

== Records ==
Prior to the competition, the existing world, European and championship records were as follows:

	Name	Nation	Time	Location	Date
World record	Bobby Finke	United States	14:30.67	Paris	4 August 2024
European record	Gregorio Paltrinieri	Italy	14:32.80	Budapest	25 June 2022
Championship record	Gregorio Paltrinieri	Italy	14:34.04	London	18 May 2016

== Results ==
=== Heats ===
The heats were started on 14 August at 11:00.

Qualification Rules: The 8 fastest from the heats qualify to the final.

Rank	Heat	Lane	Swimmer	Nation	Time	Notes
1	2	4	Oliver Klemet	Germany	14:48.51	Q
2	3	5	Johannes Liebmann	Germany	14:50.83	Q
3	3	6	Sacha Velly	France	14:51.49	Q
4	3	3	Zalán Sárkány	Hungary	14:51.94	Q
5	3	4	Sven Schwarz	Germany	14:52.16	
6	2	5	Daniel Wiffen	Ireland	14:52.29	Q
7	2	3	Dávid Betlehem	Hungary	14:57.96	Q
8	2	2	Andrei-Theodor Proca	Romania	14:57.97	Q
9	3	7	Luca de Tullio	Italy	14:59.49	Q
10	2	6	Matteo Diodato	Italy	15:01.30	
11	2	7	Victor Johansson	Sweden	15:13.74	
12	3	9	Panos Vlachogiannakos	Greece	15:14.23	
13	2	1	Dziugas Miskinis	Lithuania	15:14.47	
14	3	2	Vasileios Kakoulakis	Greece	15:14.91	
15	3	1	Nathan Wiffen	Ireland	15:15.67	
16	2	0	Nikola Simic	Serbia	15:15.72	
17	2	8	Suleyman Ismayilzada	Azerbaijan	15:29.22	
18	3	0	Henrik Christiansen	Norway	15:39.41	
19	2	9	Jakub Gabriel	Slovakia	15:43.36	
20	1	2	Stefan Vrtikapa	Bosnia and Herzegovina	15:51.36	
21	1	6	Filip Kuruzovic	Bosnia and Herzegovina	15:56.64	
22	1	5	Tobias Moen Olsen	Norway	15:56.65	
23	1	3	Liggjas Joensen	Faroe Islands	16:33.42	
	1	4	Victor Sandrup	Sweden	DNS	
	3	8	Luca Karl	Austria	DNS	

=== Final ===
The final took place on the evening of 15 August.

Rank	Lane	Swimmer	Nation	Time	Notes
1st place, gold medalist(s)	5	Johannes Liebmann	Germany	14:26.79	WR
2nd place, silver medalist(s)	6	Zalán Sárkány	Hungary	14:39.45	
3rd place, bronze medalist(s)	4	Oliver Klemet	Germany	14:40.64	
4	3	Sacha Velly	France	14:45.75	
5	8	Luca De Tullio	Italy	14:54.78	
6	7	Dávid Betlehem	Hungary	14:59.26	
7	1	Andrei-Theodor Proca	Romania	15:02.15	
8	2	Daniel Wiffen	Ireland	15:06.30	
