= Swimming at the 2022 European Aquatics Championships – Men's 400 metre freestyle =

Men's 400 metre freestyle at the 2022 European Aquatics Championships
- Venue: Foro Italico
- Dates: 17 August
- Competitors: 34 from 24 nations
- Winning time: 3:42.50

Medalists
gold medal	Lukas Märtens	Germany
silver medal	Antonio Djakovic	Switzerland
bronze medal	Henning Mühlleitner	Germany

The Men's 400 metre freestyle competition of the 2022 European Aquatics Championships was held on 17 August 2022.

== Records ==
Prior to the competition, the existing world, European and championship records were as follows.

	Name	Nationality	Time	Location	Date
World record European record	Paul Biedermann	Germany	3:40.07	Rome	26 July 2009
Championship record	Gabriele Detti	Italy	3:44.01	London	16 May 2016

The following new records were set during this competition.

Date	Event	Name	Nationality	Time	Record
17 August	Final	Lukas Märtens	Germany	3:42.50	CR

== Results ==
=== Heats ===
The heats were started at 09:27.

Rank	Heat	Lane	Name	Nationality	Time	Notes
1	5	5	Henning Mühlleitner	Germany	3:46.79	Q
2	5	4	Lukas Märtens	Germany	3:47.38	Q
3	5	6	Antonio Djakovic	Switzerland	3:47.67	Q
4	1	3	David Popovici	Romania	3:47.99	Q, WD
5	4	6	Lorenzo Galossi	Italy	3:48.15	Q
6	5	3	Gabriele Detti	Italy	3:48.32	Q
7	4	5	Marco De Tullio	Italy	3:48.38	
8	4	7	Joris Bouchaut	France	3:49.00	Q
9	4	4	Felix Auböck	Austria	3:49.16	Q
10	5	1	Sven Schwarz	Germany	3:49.58	
11	4	2	Henrik Christiansen	Norway	3:51.26	Q
12	4	1	Victor Johansson	Sweden	3:51.29	
13	5	2	Matteo Ciampi	Italy	3:52.35	
13	3	6	Luis Domínguez	Spain	3:52.35	
15	4	8	Kieran Bird	Great Britain	3:52.94	
16	3	2	Yordan Yanchev	Bulgaria	3:53.31	
17	3	7	Carlos Garach	Spain	3:53.36	
18	3	1	Sašo Boškan	Slovenia	3:53.42	
19	5	7	Kregor Zirk	Estonia	3:53.43	
20	3	9	Damien Joly	France	3:53.63	
21	3	3	Krzysztof Chmielewski	Poland	3:53.69	
22	5	8	Gábor Zombori	Hungary	3:53.84	
23	2	5	Ondřej Gemov	Czech Republic	3:54.00	
24	4	9	Bar Soloveychik	Israel	3:54.34	
25	2	4	Yoav Romano	Israel	3:54.42	
26	3	0	Dániel Mészáros	Hungary	3:54.70	
27	2	2	Finn McGeever	Ireland	3:56.52	
28	3	8	Luc Kroon	Netherlands	3:58.62	
29	2	6	Richard Nagy	Slovakia	3:59.22	
30	1	4	Pit Brandenburger	Luxembourg	3:59.73	
31	2	7	Loris Bianchi	San Marino	4:01.70	
32	2	8	Primož Šenica Pavletič	Slovenia	4:02.69	
33	2	1	Dylan Cachia	Malta	4:13.46	
34	1	5	Franc Aleksi	Albania	4:19.20	
	2	0	Liam Custer	Ireland	Did not start	
	2	3	Robin Hanson	Sweden	Did not start	
	3	4	Mikkel Gadgaard	Denmark	Did not start	
	3	5	Balázs Holló	Hungary	Did not start	
	4	0	Jon Jøntvedt	Norway	Did not start	
	4	3	Danas Rapšys	Lithuania	Did not start	
	5	0	Dimitrios Markos	Greece	Did not start	
	5	9	Mykhailo Romanchuk	Ukraine	Did not start	

=== Final ===
The final was held at 18:53.

Rank	Lane	Name	Nationality	Time	Notes
1st place, gold medalist(s)	5	Lukas Märtens	Germany	3:42.50	CR
2nd place, silver medalist(s)	3	Antonio Djakovic	Switzerland	3:43.93	NR
3rd place, bronze medalist(s)	4	Henning Mühlleitner	Germany	3:44.53	
4	1	Felix Auböck	Austria	3:45.76	
5	6	Lorenzo Galossi	Italy	3:46.94	
6	7	Joris Bouchaut	France	3:47.20	
7	2	Gabriele Detti	Italy	3:47.34	
8	8	Henrik Christiansen	Norway	3:50.30	
