= 2025 U.S. Open Swimming Championships =

Swimming competition in the United States

- Host city: Austin, Texas, United States
- Date: December 3–6
- Venue: Lee and Joe Jamail Texas Swimming Center
- Events: 34

The 2025 Toyota U.S. Open Swimming Championships took place from December 3 to 6, 2025, at Lee and Joe Jamail Texas Swimming Center in Austin, Texas, United States. Competition was conducted in a long course (50-meter) pool.

== Results ==
=== Men ===
Event	Gold		Silver		Bronze	
50 m freestyle	Chris Guiliano	21.57 CR	Andrej Barna	21.62	Matt King	21.74
100 m freestyle	Jack Alexy	47.40 CR	Chris Guiliano	47.63	Patrick Sammon	48.05
200 m freestyle	Luke Hobson	1:44.49 CR	Chris Guiliano	1:45.67	Patrick Sammon	1:46.59
400 m freestyle	Leon Marchand	3:44.70 CR	Luka Mijatovic	3:45.30	Carson Foster	3:45.73
800 m freestyle	Luka Mijatovic	7:48.28	Ilia Sibirtsev	7:51.85	Luke Whitlock	7:54.66
1500 m freestyle	Ilia Sibirtsev	15:05.51 NR	Bobby Finke	15:09.21	Ivan Puskovitch	15:10.91
50 m backstroke	Shaine Casas	24.53	Henry Elmore Allan	24.65	Hubert Kos	24.74
100 m backstroke	Hubert Kos	52.63	Blake Tierney	53.52	Ivan Tarasov	53.77
200 m backstroke	Hubert Kos	1:54.21 CR	Blake Tierney	1:58.21	Cornelius Jahn	1:59.06
50 m breaststroke	Michael Houlie	26.72	Van Mathias	26.94	Campbell McKean	27.10
100 m breaststroke	Alexei Avakov	59.45	Campbell McKean	59.67	Jack Kelly	59.72
200 m breaststroke	Jack Kelly	2:09.90	Noah Cakir	2:11.38	Josh Matheny	2:11.98
50 m butterfly	Ilya Kharun	22.98	Dare Rose	23.17	Matt King	23.22
100 m butterfly	Shaine Casas	50.24 CR	Ilya Kharun	50.40	Leon Marchand	51.20
200 m butterfly	Leon Marchand	1:52.57 CR	Ilya Kharun	1:55.71	Hubert Kos	1:56.01
200 m individual medley	Hubert Kos	1:55.50 CR	Baylor Nelson	1:58.36	Finlay Knox	1:58.74
400 m individual medley	Carson Foster	4:07.02 CR	Luka Mijatovic Baylor Nelson	4:15.91	Not awarded	

=== Women ===
Event	Gold		Silver		Bronze	
50 m freestyle	Kate Douglass	24.20 CR	Simone Manuel	24.42	Gretchen Walsh	24.57
100 m freestyle	Simone Manuel	53.33	Gretchen Walsh	53.76	Kate Douglass	53.82
200 m freestyle	Simone Manuel	1:56.66	Anna Peplowski	1:57.43	Liberty Clark	1:58.18
400 m freestyle	Summer McIntosh	3:55.37 US, CR	Anna Peplowski	4:10.55	Emma Weyant	4:11.25
800 m freestyle	Mila Nikanorov	8:34.38	Leticia Fassina Romao	8:41.05	Alex Siegel	8:41.77
1500 m freestyle	Mila Nikanorov	16:19.80	Leticia Fassina Romao	16:25.92	Emma Finlin	16:37.59
50 m backstroke	Katharine Berkoff	27.28	Regan Smith	27.52	Ingrid Wilm	27.87
100 m backstroke	Regan Smith	58.19	Katharine Berkoff	58.71	Leah Shackley	59.42
200 m backstroke	Regan Smith	2:05.52	Leah Shackley	2:07.21	Phoebe Bacon	2:07.77
50 m breaststroke	Mona McSharry	30.48	Skyler Smith	30.59	Mackenzie Lung	30.73
100 m breaststroke	Kate Douglass	1:06.55	Alexanne Lepage Mona McSharry	1:06.81	Not awarded	
200 m breaststroke	Kate Douglass	2:20.86 CR	Alex Walsh	2:24.88	Mona McSharry	2:24.91
50 m butterfly	Gretchen Walsh	25.18	Mary-Sophie Harvey	26.43	Emily Jones	26.51
100 m butterfly	Gretchen Walsh	55.60 CR	Regan Smith	56.18	Summer McIntosh	57.01
200 m butterfly	Summer McIntosh	2:02.62 US, CR	Regan Smith	2:06.89	Alex Shackell	2:09.30
200 m individual medley	Kate Douglass	2:07.85 CR	Alex Walsh	2:09.18	Mary-Sophie Harvey	2:09.19
400 m individual medley	Mary-Sophie Harvey	4:36.75	Tara Kinder	4:39.01	Emma Weyant	4:39.45
