= Swimming at the 2024 European Aquatics Championships – Men's 1500 metre freestyle =

Men's 1500 metre freestyle at the 2024 European Aquatics Championships
- Venue: Sports Centre Milan Gale Muškatirović
- Dates: 22 June (heats); 23 June (final)
- Competitors: 12 from 12 nations
- Winning time: 14:55.64

Medalists
gold medal	Kuzey Tunçelli	Turkey
silver medal	Mykhailo Romanchuk	Ukraine
bronze medal	Zalán Sárkány	Hungary

The Men's 1500 metre freestyle competition of the 2024 European Aquatics Championships was held on 18 and 19 June 2024.

== Records ==
Prior to the competition, the existing world, European and championship records were as follows.

	Name	Nation	Time	Location	Date
World record	Sun Yang	China	14:31.02	London	4 August 2012
European record	Gregorio Paltrinieri	Italy	14:32.80	Budapest	25 July 2022
Championship record	Gregorio Paltrinieri	Italy	14:34.04	London	18 May 2016

== Results ==
=== Heats ===
The heats were started on 22 June at 10:24.
Qualification Rules: The 8 fastest from the heats qualify to the final.

Rank	Heat	Lane	Name	Nationality	Time	Notes
1	2	4	Mykhailo Romanchuk	Ukraine	15:01.20	Q
2	2	5	Kuzey Tunçelli	Turkey	15:01.53	Q
3	1	4	Zalán Sárkány	Hungary	15:09.28	Q
4	1	5	Nathan Wiffen	Ireland	15:10.01	Q
5	2	2	Džiugas Miškinis	Lithuania	15:26.33	Q
6	1	6	Marin Mogić	Croatia	15:31.21	Q
7	2	6	Bartosz Kapala	Poland	15:31.80	Q
8	2	3	László Gálicz	Hungary	15:44.27	Q
9	1	7	Filip Kuruzović	Bosnia and Herzegovina	15:50.65	
10	1	2	Nikola Simić	Croatia	16:05.69	
11	2	7	Kevin Pereira Teixeira	Andorra	16:12.59	
	1	3	Dimitrios Markos	Greece	Did not start	

=== Final ===
The final was held on 23 June at 18:10.

Rank	Lane	Name	Nationality	Time	Notes
1st place, gold medalist(s)	5	Kuzey Tunçelli	Turkey	14:55.64	
2nd place, silver medalist(s)	4	Mykhailo Romanchuk	Ukraine	15:00.99	
3rd place, bronze medalist(s)	3	Zalán Sárkány	Hungary	15:06.67	
4	6	Nathan Wiffen	Ireland	15:10.64	
5	8	László Gálicz	Hungary	15:23.48	
6	1	Bartosz Kapala	Poland	15:26.22	
7	7	Marin Mogić	Croatia	15:32.59	
8	2	Džiugas Miškinis	Lithuania	15:44.10	
