= Léon Marchand =

French swimmer (born 2002)

Léon Marchand CLH OLY
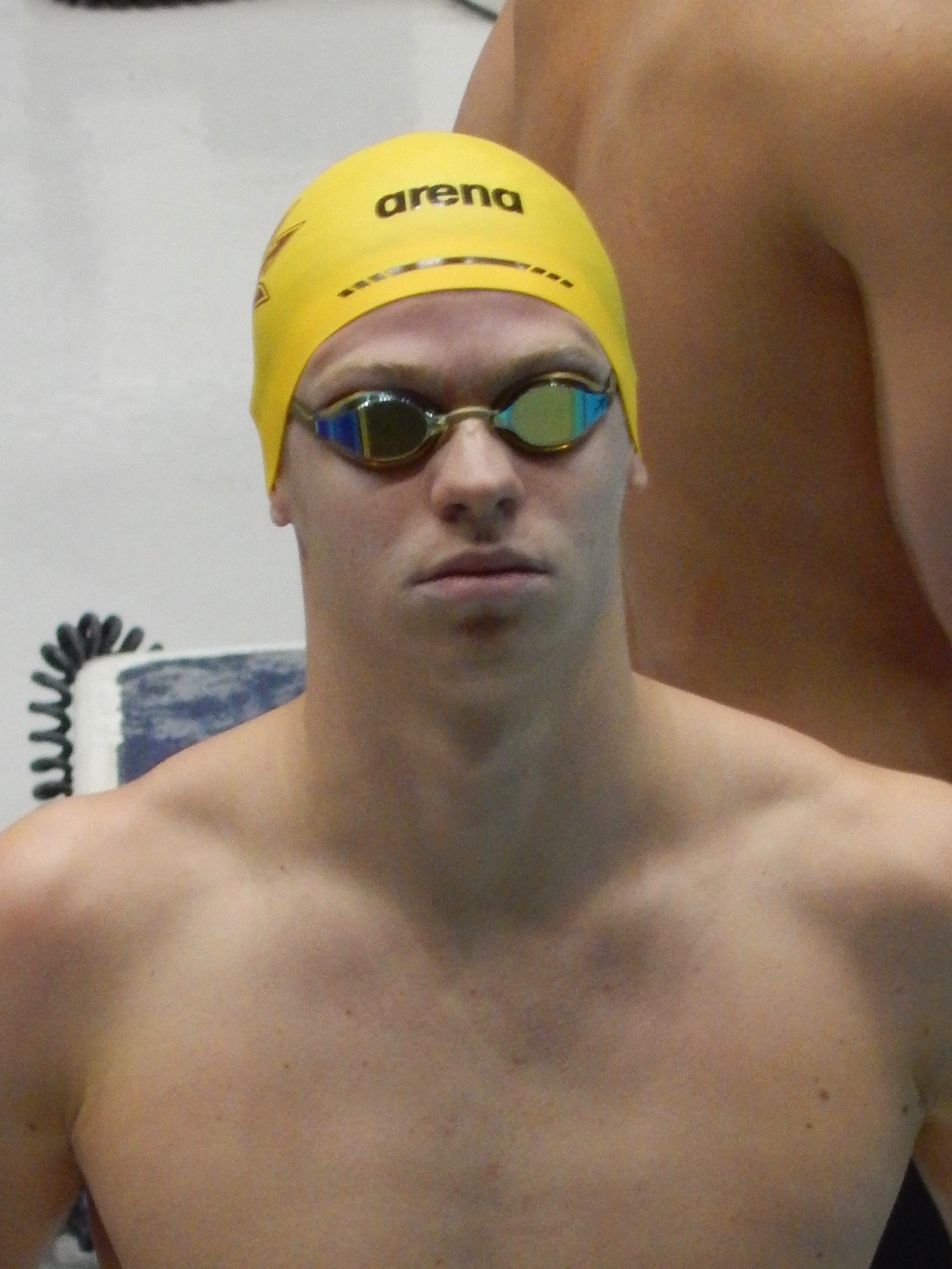
- Marchand in 2023

Personal information
- Nationality: French
- Born: 17 May 2002 (age 24) Toulouse, France
- Height: 1.87 m (6 ft 2 in)
- Weight: 77 kg (170 lb)

Sport
- Sport: Swimming
- Strokes: Breaststroke, Individual Medley, Butterfly, Freestyle
- Club: (United States) University of Texas at Austin
- Coach: Bob Bowman, Nicolas Castel
Medal record
Men's swimming
Representing France
Event	1st	2nd	3rd
Olympic Games	4	0	1
World Championships (LC)	7	2	0
European Championships	2	1	1
World Junior Championships	0	0	1
European Junior Championships	0	0	2
Total	13	3	5
Olympic Games Olympic Games
Gold medal – first place	2024 Paris	200 m breaststroke
Gold medal – first place	2024 Paris	200 m butterfly
Gold medal – first place	2024 Paris	200 m medley
Gold medal – first place	2024 Paris	400 m medley
Bronze medal – third place	2024 Paris	4x100 m medley
World Championships (LC)
Gold medal – first place	2022 Budapest	200 m medley
Gold medal – first place	2022 Budapest	400 m medley
Gold medal – first place	2023 Fukuoka	200 m butterfly
Gold medal – first place	2023 Fukuoka	200 m medley
Gold medal – first place	2023 Fukuoka	400 m medley
Gold medal – first place	2025 Singapore	200 m medley
Gold medal – first place	2025 Singapore	400 m medley
Silver medal – second place	2022 Budapest	200 m butterfly
Silver medal – second place	2025 Singapore	4x100 m medley
European Championships (LC)
Gold medal – first place	2026 Paris	200 m butterfly
Gold medal – first place	2026 Paris	400 m freestyle
Silver medal – second place	2026 Paris	4×200 m freestyle
Bronze medal – third place	2026 Paris	4×100 m medley
World Junior Championships
Bronze medal – third place	2019 Budapest	400 m medley
European Junior Championships
Bronze medal – third place	2019 Kazan	200 m breaststroke
Bronze medal – third place	2019 Kazan	400 m medley

Léon Marchand (French pronunciation: [leɔ̃ maʁʃɑ̃]; born 17 May 2002) is a French professional swimmer actively training in the US. He is the World record holder in the long course 200 and 400 metres individual medley, and in the short course 200 metres individual medley; the Olympic record holder in the 200 and 400 metres individual medley, 200 metres butterfly and the 200 metres breaststroke; the European record holder in the long course 200 and 400 metres individual medley and the 200 meters breaststroke, in the short course 100 and 200 metres individual medley and the French record holder in the long course 200 and 400 metres individual medley, 400 metres freestyle, 200 metres butterfly and the 200 metres breaststroke, and in the short course 100, 200, 400 metres individual medley and the 200 metres breaststroke. At the 2024 Summer Olympics, he won gold medals in the 200 m medley, 200 metre breaststroke, 200 metre butterfly, and 400 metre medley. He became the fourth swimmer and third male swimmer in Olympic history to win four individual gold medals at a single Games, thus dubbed the "modern Michael Phelps".

As a member of the Arizona State University swim team, at the 2022 NCAA Division I Men's Swimming and Diving Championships, Marchand won NCAA titles in the 200 yard breaststroke and 200 yard individual medley. At the 2023 NCAA Division I Men's Swimming and Diving Championships, he won NCAA titles in the 200 yard breaststroke, 200 yard individual medley, and 400 yard individual medley. At the 2024 NCAA Division I Men's Swimming and Diving Championships in his last year before going pro, he won NCAA titles in the 200 yard breaststroke, 500 yard freestyle and 400 yard individual medley. He won with his college swim team the NCAA championship title for the first time ever.

== Early life ==
Marchand was born on 17 May 2002 in Toulouse, France. He is the son of former medley swimmers Xavier Marchand and Céline Bonnet. His uncle, Christophe Marchand, is also a former freestyle swimmer. As a child, Marchand first took up judo and then rugby, and although he was not pushed into swimming by his parents, he quickly felt at ease in the water with the Dauphins du TOEC club at the age of six.

The club is an extension of my family. At seven years old, I really started swimming. But I was skinny, I was too cold in the water and I stopped for a year or two. It was only during vacations that I enjoyed being in the water.

— Marchand in Le magazine L'Équipe in 2023.

Trained and coached by Nicolas Castel in the Toulouse club until 2021, Marchand began training with an adjusted schedule around the age of 12 or 13. Although he was versatile in freestyle, butterfly, and breaststroke and a good swimmer over various distances, he was not the best national swimmer of his generation in the youth categories, being shorter and less powerful than some of his young competitors. In 2017, as a teenager, he tried the 400m individual medley on his parents' advice and developed a passion for the event.

Alongside his sports career, Marchand earned a scientific baccalaureate with highest honors and pursued computer science studies at Toulouse III - Paul Sabatier University. Encouraged by his parents, Marchand moved to the United States in August 2021, settling in Arizona. He wanted to be coached by Bob Bowman, Michael Phelps' mentor. He was a junior during 2023–24 at Arizona State University, majoring in computer science. He then followed Bowman to Texas.

== Career ==
=== Pre-2022 ===
==== 2019 World Junior Championships ====
2019 World Junior Championships
Bronze medal – third place	400 m individual medley	4:16.37 (NR)

In August 2019, at the World Junior Swimming Championships in Budapest, Hungary, Marchand won the bronze medal in the 400 metre individual medley with a French record time of 4:16.37. He also placed seventh with a time of 2:01.53 in the 200 metre individual medley, seventh swimming a 1:58.73 in the final of the 200 metre butterfly, tenth in the 200 metre breaststroke with a 2:15.13, and 15th in the 100 metre breaststroke in a time of 1:03.03.

==== 2020 Summer Olympics ====
Marchand qualified in his first event for the 2020 Summer Olympics in Tokyo at the 2021 French Elite Swimming Championships in Chartres, making the French Olympic Team in the 400 metre individual medley with a personal best and French record time of 4:09.65. At the 2020 Summer Olympics in Tokyo, Japan, Marchand placed sixth in the 400 metre individual medley with a 4:11.16, tenth in the 100 metre medley relay, 14th in the 200 metre butterfly with a 1:55.68, and 18th in the 200 metre individual medley with a 1:58.30.

=== 2022 ===
==== 2022 NCAA Championships ====
2022 NCAA Championships
Gold medal – first place	200 yd individual medley	1:37.69 (CR)
Gold medal – first place	200 yd breaststroke	1:48.20
Silver medal – second place	400 yd individual medley	3:34.08
Silver medal – second place	4×100 yd freestyle	2:46.40

At the 2022 NCAA Division I Championships in March in Atlanta, United States, Marchand won his first individual NCAA title of his freshman year for the Arizona State Sun Devils in the 200 yard individual medley, winning the event and setting new NCAA, NCAA Championships, and US Open records with his time of 1:37.69, which was over four-tenths of a second faster than the old marks of 1:38.13 set by Caeleb Dressel in 2018 (NCAA and US Open records) and 1:38.14 set by Andrew Seliskar in 2019 (NCAA Championships record). It was the first time since 2000 that a man from the Arizona State University swim program won an individual title in swimming at an NCAA Division I men's swimming and diving championships. He won a second NCAA title in the 200 yard breaststroke, finishing 0.56 seconds ahead of second-place finisher Max McHugh with a time of 1:48.20. He placed second in the 400 yard individual medley, with a 3:34.08 to finish behind Hugo González, as well as in the 4×100 yard freestyle relay, where he split a 41.31 for the second leg of the relay to help finish in a final time of 2:46.40.

Seven days after the end of the 2022 NCAA Championships, Marchand set a new French record in the 200 metre individual medley at the 2022 TYR Pro Swim Series at Northside Swim Center in San Antonio, United States, with a time of 1:56.95 and won the silver medal behind Shaine Casas who finished in 1:56.70. One day earlier, he won the 200 metre breaststroke with a time of 2:09.24.

==== 2022 World Aquatics Championships ====
2022 World Championships
Gold medal – first place	400 m individual medley	4:04.28 (ER,CR)
Gold medal – first place	200 m individual medley	1:55.22 (NR)
Silver medal – second place	200 m butterfly	1:53.37 (NR)

On 18 June, the first day of 2022 World Aquatics Championships at Danube Arena in Budapest, Hungary, Marchand set a new French record in the 400 metre individual medley in the preliminary heats with a time of 4:09.09, qualifying for the evening final ranking first. He lowered his French record and set a new European record and Championships record in the final with a time of 4:04.28 to win the gold medal. With this time, he became the second fastest performer of all time in this event. Two days later, he qualified for the semifinals of the 200 metre butterfly with a time of 1:56.38 and tied rank of eleventh in the prelims. For the semifinals, he ranked 0.18 seconds ahead of the next-fastest swimmer, fifth-ranked Luca Urlando of the United States, and qualified for the final the following day with his new French record time of 1:54.32.

The following morning, Marchand qualified for the semifinals of the 200 metre individual medley, swimming a 1:58.70 to tie for eighth-rank heading into the semifinals. For his first race of the evening, he set a new French record in the final of the 200 metre butterfly at 1:53.37 and won the silver medal, finishing behind Kristóf Milák of Hungary and ahead of Tomoru Honda of Japan. In his final race of the day, the semifinals of the 200 metre individual medley, he set a new French record with a time of 1:55.75 and qualified for the final ranking first. In the final of the 200 metre individual medley the following day, he won the gold medal with a French record time of 1:55.22.

With his two gold medals, Marchand became the third French swimmer to achieve two gold medals in individual events at a single FINA World Aquatics Championships, after Laure Manaudou and Florent Manaudou. He also became the first male swimmer representing France to win any medal in the 400 metre individual medley at a World Aquatics Championships, the first since 1998 to win a medal in the 200 m individual medley and the 200 meter butterfly and the first to win a gold medal in the 200 metre individual medley.

On 23 June, Marchand splits a 1:47.59 for the second leg of the 4×200 metre freestyle relay in the final to help achieve a seventh-place finish in 7:08.78. In the preliminaries of the 4×100 metre medley relay on the eighth day, Marchand helped advance the relay to the final ranking second with a time of 52.09 seconds for the butterfly leg of the relay. He lowered his split to a 51.50 in the final, contributing to a time of 3:32.37 and fifth-place finish At the end of the competition, Marchand is awarded best male swimmer of the championships (with Katie Ledecky on women's side). The month after the Championships, Marchand set a new French record in the 200 metre breaststroke with a time of 2:08.76 at the 2022 Spanish Summer Championships in Sabadell, Spain.

=== 2023 ===
Leading up to NCAA and conference championships season in 2023, Marchand set new NCAA and US Open records in the 400 yard individual medley with a time of 3:31.84 in a dual meet against the California Golden Bears on 21 January.

==== 2023 Pac-12 Conference Championships ====
On 1 March, the first day of the 2023 Pac-12 Conference Championships at King County Aquatic Center in Federal Way, United States, Marchand helped win the conference title in the 4×50 yard medley relay in a Pac-12 Conference and Championships record time of 1:21.69, splitting a 22.98 for the breaststroke leg of the relay. He repeated the trio of conference title, conference record, and Championships record later in the session in the 4×200 yard freestyle relay, where he contributed a lead-off time of 1:30.77 to the final mark of 6:06.30. The times for both relays also set new Arizona State Sun Devils swim program records for the men's events. Following up with a 1:37.81 in the 200 yard individual medley the next day, he won his second-consecutive conference title in the event and lowered his Championships record from the previous year's edition by 1.84 seconds. On day three, he lowered his US Open and NCAA records in the 400 yard individual medley, setting new conference, Championships, and program records with a time of 3:31.57 to win the conference title. He splits a 49.73 for the breaststroke leg of the 4×100 yard medley relay later in the session, helping win the conference title with a program record time of 3:01.39.

The fourth of four days, Marchand broke the US Open and NCAA records of 1:47.91 in the 200 yard breaststroke set by Will Licon in 2017, winning the conference title with a personal best time of 1:47.67. For his final event, the 4×100 yard freestyle relay, he led-off with a 41.61 to contribute to a second-place time of 2:46.14. The points allocated for each of his swims contributed to an overall score of 897.5 points for the Arizona State Sun Devils, which earned the men's swim program its first team Pac-12 Conference Championships title.

==== 2023 NCAA Championships ====
2023 NCAA Championships
Gold medal – first place	200 yd individual medley	1:36.34 (CR)
Gold medal – first place	400 yd individual medley	3:28.82 (CR)
Gold medal – first place	200 yd breaststroke	1:46.91 (CR)
Silver medal – second place	4×50 yd medley	1:21.07
Silver medal – second place	4×200 yd freestyle	6:05.08
Bronze medal – third place	4×100 yd medley	2:59.18
Bronze medal – third place	4×100 yd freestyle	2:45.12

Later in the month, at the 2023 NCAA Division I Championships, Marchand helped win the silver medal in the 4×50 yard medley relay in a time of 1:21.07 on the first day of competition, splitting a 22.27 for the breaststroke leg of the relay. Later in the session, he anchored with a 1:28.42 in the 4×200 yard freestyle relay to help win the silver medal in a time of 6:05.08. Both relay times set new men's swim program records for the Arizona State Sun Devils. His split time of 22.27 lowered the former fastest 50 yard breaststroke split time in NCAA history of 22.39 seconds set by Max McHugh two heats earlier. His split time of 1:28.42 for his 200-yard portion of the 4×200 yard freestyle relay ranked as the fastest in NCAA history as well. On the second day, he won the NCAA title in the 200 yard individual medley for the second consecutive year, lowering his NCAA, Championships, and US Open records in the event to a 1:36.34.

In the final of the 400 yard individual medley on the third evening, Marchand won the gold medal with a new NCAA, Championships, and US Open record time of 3:28.82, which was over two full seconds faster than his previous mark of 3:31.57. For his second final of the evening, he contributed the fastest 100 yard breaststroke split time in NCAA history (49.23 seconds) to a bronze medal-win in the 4×100 yard medley relay in an Arizona State Sun Devils men's swim program record time of 2:59.18. Starting the fourth finals session with the 200 yard breaststroke, he won his second repeat title and third title overall of the Championships, lowering his NCAA and US Open records as well as setting a new Championships record with a personal best time of 1:46.91. Finishing the Championships in the 4×100 yard freestyle relay later in the session, he splits a 40.55 for the second leg of the relay to contribute to placing third overall with a program record time of 2:45.12. His performances contributed to the first-ever top-five finish for the Arizona State Sun Devils men's swim program at an men's NCAA Division I Swimming and Diving Championships, with the team placing second overall with 430 points, just 52 points behind the first-place team (California Golden Bears) and 46 points ahead of the third-place team (Texas Longhorns).

==== 2023 French Championships ====
Following the conclusion of the collegiate championships, Marchand competed at the 2023 TYR Pro Swim Series in April, winning the 400 metre individual medley with a 4:07.80, the 200 metre butterfly with a 1:55.58, the 200 metre breaststroke with a 2:10.52, and the 200 metre individual medley with a 1:55.69. In June, he won the gold medal in the 200 metre breaststroke at the 2023 French Elite Swimming Championships on day one in Rennes, finishing in a French record and 2023 World Aquatics Championships qualifying time of 2:06.59 that marked a time drop of 2.17 seconds from his previous personal best and French record time. On the second day, he swam a personal best time of 1:48.70 in the preliminaries of the 200 metre freestyle and qualified ranking seventh for the final, where he won the gold medal with a personal best time of 1:46.44. For the 200 metre butterfly on day three, Marchand won the gold medal with a time of 1:55.79. He won his fourth national title on the fourth day in the 200 metre individual medley, where he finished first with a time of 1:56.25 in the final. In the 400 metre individual medley on day five, he achieved a World Championships qualifying time of 4:10.57 in the final and won the gold medal and national title.

==== 2023 World Aquatics Championships ====
2023 World Championships
Gold medal – first place	400 m individual medley	4:02.50 (WR)
Gold medal – first place	200 m individual medley	1:54.82 (ER)
Gold medal – first place	200 m butterfly	1:52.43 (NR)

On 23 July, the first day of 2023 World Aquatics Championships at Fukuoka in Japan, Marchand ranked second behind Carson Foster in the preliminary heats of the 400 metre individual medley with a time of 4:10.88. He set a new World record in the final with a time of 4:02.50 to win the gold medal. Two days later, he qualified for the semifinals of the 200 metre butterfly with a time of 1:55.46 and tied rank of seventh in the prelims. For the semifinals, he ranked second behind Carson Foster with a time of 1:54.21 and qualified for the final the following day.

The following morning, Marchand qualified for the semifinals of the 200 metre individual medley, swimming a 1:58.38 to tie for ninth-rank heading into the semifinals. For his first race of the evening, he set a new French record in the final of the 200 metre butterfly at 1:52.43 and won the gold medal. With this time, he became the third fastest performer of all time in this event. In his final race of the day, the semifinals of the 200 metre individual medley, he ranked first with a time of 1:56.34. In the final of the 200 metre individual medley the following day, he won the gold medal with a European record time of 1:54.82. With this time, he became the third fastest performer of all time in this event. With his three gold medals, he became the first French swimmer to achieve three gold medals in individual events at a single World Aquatics Championships and the first French swimmer to win five individual gold medals in all at World Aquatics Championships ahead of Camille Lacourt and his four individual gold medals. He also became the first male swimmer representing France to win a gold medal in the 200 metre butterfly at a World Aquatics Championships.

On 28 July, Marchand splits a 1:44.89 for the fourth leg of the 4×200 metre freestyle relay in the final to help achieve a fourth-place finish in 7:03.86. On 30 July, in the preliminaries of the 4×100 metre medley relay, Marchand helped advance the relay to the final ranking second with a time of 59.57 seconds for the breaststroke leg of the relay. In the evening final of the same day, he splits a 59 seconds for the breaststroke leg of the relay and helped to achieve a fourth-place finish in 3:29.88. At the end of the competition, he is awarded best male swimmer of the championships (with Kaylee McKeown on women's side).

=== 2024 ===
==== 2024 Summer Olympics ====
2024 Summer Olympics
Gold medal – first place	400 m individual medley	4:02.95 (OR)
Gold medal – first place	200 m individual medley	1:54.06 (OR,ER)
Gold medal – first place	200 m butterfly	1:51.21 (OR,NR)
Gold medal – first place	200 m breaststroke	2:05.85 (OR,ER)
Bronze medal – third place	100 m medley relay	3:28.38 (NR)

At the 2024 Summer Olympics in Paris, Marchand finished with the most gold medals among individuals participants, with four, and was tied for the second-most total medals, with five (four gold, one bronze), breaking four Olympic records. On 28 July in the morning, Marchand ranked first in the preliminary heats of the 400 metre individual medley with a time of 4:08.30. He won the final in the evening in an Olympic record time of 4:02.95 for his first career Olympic medal, making him the tenth French swimmer to become Olympic Champion, the seventh French swimming individual Olympic Champion and the first to do so since the 2012 Summer Olympics in London.

On 30 July in the morning, he ranked sixth in the preliminary heats of the 200 metre butterfly with a time of 1:55.26. The same day in the evening, he ranked second in the semifinals with a time of 1:53.50 to advance to the final. On 30 July in the afternoon, he ranked third in the preliminary heats of the 200 metre breaststroke with a time of 2:09.55. The same day in the evening, he ranked first in the semifinals with a time of 2:08.11 to advance to the final. On 31 July in the evening, he won first the 200 metre butterfly and then the 200 metre breaststroke setting a new Olympic record and French record in a time of 1:51.21 for the 200 metre butterfly and a new Olympic record, European record and French record in a time of 2:05.85 for the 200 metre breaststroke. He has become the second swimmer to win two individual gold medals the same day since Kornelia Ender at the 1976 Summer Olympics in Montreal in the events of the 200 metre freestyle and the 100 metre butterfly.

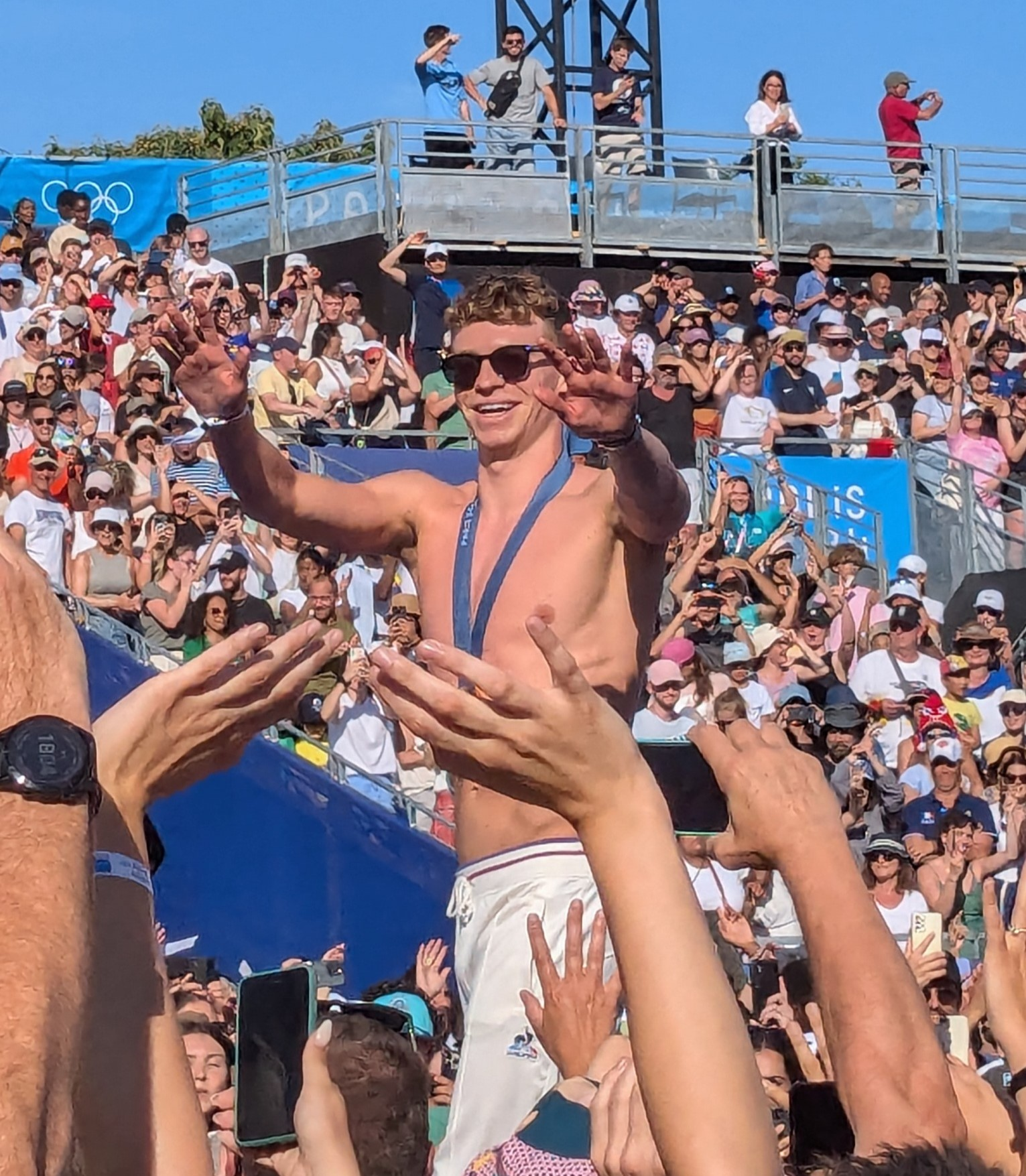
Marchand at Parc des Champions

On 1 August in the morning, Marchand ranked third in the preliminary heats of the 200 metre individual medley with a time of 1:57.86. The same day in the evening, he ranked first in the semifinals with a time of 1:56.31 to advance to the final. On 2 August, he won his fourth gold medal in the final of the 200 metre individual medley in an Olympic record time of 1:54.06, becoming the first French Olympian to win four gold medals at the same Olympics and the fourth swimmer (with Mark Spitz in 1972 Summer Olympics in Munich, Kristin Otto in 1988 Summer Olympics in Seoul and Michael Phelps in 2004 Summer Olympics in Athens and 2008 Summer Olympics in Beijing) to win four individual gold medals at the same Olympics.

On 3 August, in the evening final of the 100 metre mixed medley relay, Marchand splits a 58.66 seconds for the breaststroke leg of the relay and helped to achieve a fourth-place finish in a new French record of 3:40.96. Also on 3 August, in the preliminaries of the 100 metre medley relay, Marchand helped advance the relay to the final ranking first with a time of 59.03 seconds for the breaststroke leg of the relay. On 4 August in the evening, he splits a 58.62 seconds for the breaststroke leg of the relay and helped to achieve a bronze medal in a new French record of 3:28.38. Marchand has been mentioned frequently as the next Phelps, including by Phelps himself. Marchand was chosen to carry the Olympic flame during the closing ceremony.

==== 2024 Swimming World Cup ====
Following the Olympic Games, Marchand competed in the Swimming World Cup, winning gold in all three medley events (100 IM, 200 IM and 400 IM) at all three World Cup legs, held in Shanghai in China, Incheon in South Korea, and in Singapore. On 31 October in Singapore, he broke the 100 IM short course European record (49.92) becoming the second swimmer ever behind world record holder, American Caeleb Dressel. The day after, he also broke the 200 IM short course World record (1:48.88) and is named the overall male winner of the world cup. On 30 November, he decided to pull out of World Aquatics Swimming Championships (25 m) in Budapest due to exhaustion and injury. He is named World Aquatics' male swimmer of the year on 15 December.

=== 2025 ===
Following the Olympic year and going pro, Marchand decided to train with Dean Boxall in Brisbane, Australia. He got back into competition at the 2025 TYR Pro Swim Series in Fort Lauderdale in April, finishing second in the 400 metre individual medley with a time of 4:13.86, in the 200 metre individual medley with a 1:57.27 time, third in the 400 metre freestyle with a 3:48.97, and eighth in the 200 metre freestyle with a 1:49.66 time. In May, he competed in the ST TXLA Longhorns Aquatics and achieved the qualification times for the 2025 World Aquatics Championships in placing first in the 400 metre individual medley with a time of 4:07.11 and in the 200 meter breastroke in a 2:08.25 time. He also raced in the 400 metre freestyle with a 3:48.62 time by finishing third but not reached the qualification time needed.

In June, Marchand decided to withdraw from the French Championships in Montpellier, France and got an exemption from the French Swimming Federation. Finally, he took part in a meet in Indianapolis, United States and swam four events. He finished first in the 100 meter breastroke in 59.95 and in the 200 metre individual medley with a 1:57.23 time. He placed second in the 200 meter backstroke in 1:57.14 and seventh in the 100 meter freestyle in 49.70.

==== 2025 World Aquatics Championships ====
2025 World Championships
Gold medal – first place	400 m individual medley	4:04.73
Gold medal – first place	200 m individual medley	1:53.68
Silver medal – second place	100 m medley relay	3:27.96 (NR)

On 30 July, the fourth day of 2025 World Aquatics Championships at Singapore , Marchand ranked first in the preliminary heats of the 200 metre individual medley with a time of 1:57.63. He set a new World record in the second semifinal in the evening with a time of 1:52.69. One day later, he wins the gold medal in the final of the 200 metre individual medley with a time of 1:53.68. On 1 August, he splits a 1:44.34 for the fourth leg of the 4×200 metre freestyle relay in the final to help achieve a sixth-place finish in 7:03.69.

The last day of the competition, Marchand ranked seventh in the preliminary heats of the 400 metre individual medley with a time of 4:13.19. In the evening, he wins the gold medal in the final of the 400 metre individual medley with a time of 4:04.73. Thirty minutes later, he splits a 58.44 for the breaststroke leg of the final of the 4×100 metre medley relay and helped to achieve a silver medal in a new French record of 3:27.96. At the end of the competition, he is awarded best male swimmer of the championships (with Summer McIntosh on women's side).

==== 2025 Swimming World Cup ====
Léon Marchand takes part in the first stop of the Swimming World Cup in Carmel (10 October-12 October) in the United States. He races four events (200 meter individual medley, 400 meter freestyle, 200 meter backstroke and 200 meter breaststroke). In the 200 meter individual medley, he finishes second behind Shaine Casas in a time of 1.49.73. In the 400 meter freestyle, he takes the third place in a time of 3.38.25. In the 200 meter backstroke, he finishes second behind Hubert Kós in a French record time of 1.47.68. Finally, in the 200 meter breaststroke, he takes also the second place behind Caspar Corbeau in a new French record time of 2.02.00.

In December, Marchand closes the year by taking part in 2025 Toyota U.S. Open in home at Austin. He races five events. He wins the 400 meter freestyle in a time of 3.44.70. In 100 meter butterfly, he finishes third in 51.20. In 100 meter backstroke, he finishes 26th in series (56.87) and doesn't qualify for finals. In 100 meter breaststroke, he finishes first in the final B in 1.00.56. To conclude the meet, he wins the 200 meter butterfly in a time of 1.52.57.

=== 2026 ===
Léon Marchand started the year in competing at the 2026 USA swimming Pro Swim Series in Austin. On 15 January, he won the 200 meter individual medley in 1.57.65 and placed second in the 200 meter backstroke in 1.57.90 behind his French compatriot Yohann Ndoye-Brouard. The following day, he won the 400 meter individual medley in a time of 4.13.21. He concluded the meet on 17th by winning the 200 meter breaststroke in 2.09.72.

Marchand took part in a new Pro Swim Series in Westmont from 4 to 7 March. The first day he won a double 200 meter backstroke/200 meter breaststroke, in 1.57.56 for the first and 2.10.06 for the second. The third day he placed sixth in 200 meter freestyle in a time of 1.47.12. Finally, the last day he finished fourth in 400 meter freestyle in 3.48.79. He took part in another competition (Speedo Fort Lauderdale open) from 29 April to 2 May. On 30 April, he won the 200 meter butterfly in 1.53.08. The next day, he won the 400 meter individual medley in a time of 4.09.33. Finally, the last day he won a double 200 meter breaststroke/200 meter individual medley, in 2.09.04 for the first and 1.57.28 for the second. He participated in French championships from 27 June to 2 July. The first day, he won the 400 meter individual medley in 4.04.56, the world best performance of the year and fifth-fastest swim in world history.

== International championships (50 m) ==
Meet	100 breast	200 breast	200 fly	400 freestyle	200 medley	400 medley	4×200 freestyle	4×100 medley
Junior level
EJC 2019		3rd place, bronze medalist(s)			4th	3rd place, bronze medalist(s)		
WJC 2019	15th	10th	7th		7th	3rd place, bronze medalist(s)		
Senior level
EC 2021		28th	14th			DNS		
OG 2021			14th		18th	6th		10th
WC 2022			2nd place, silver medalist(s)		1st place, gold medalist(s)	1st place, gold medalist(s)	7th	5th
WC 2023		DNS	1st place, gold medalist(s)		1st place, gold medalist(s)	1st place, gold medalist(s)	4th	4th
OG 2024		1st place, gold medalist(s)	1st place, gold medalist(s)		1st place, gold medalist(s)	1st place, gold medalist(s)		3rd place, bronze medalist(s)
WC 2025					1st place, gold medalist(s)	1st place, gold medalist(s)	6th	2nd place, silver medalist(s)
EC 2026			1st place, gold medalist(s)	1st place, gold medalist(s)			2nd place, silver medalist(s)	3rd place, bronze medalist(s)

== International championships (25 m) ==
Meet	200 fly	100 medley	200 medley	400 medley
EC 2019	30th	22nd	25th	8th

== Swimming World Cup circuits ==
Marchand has won the following medals at World Aquatics Swimming World Cup circuits.

Edition	Gold medals	Silver medals	Bronze medals	Total
2024	9	1		10
2025		3	1	4
Total	9	4	1	14

== Personal best times ==
=== Long course metres (50 m pool) ===
Event	Time		Meet	Location	Date	Notes	Ref
100 m freestyle	49.70		2025 Indy Summer Cup	Indianapolis, Indiana, United States	28 June 2025		
200 m freestyle	1:43.76	r	2026 European Championships	Paris, France	10 August 2026		
400 m freestyle	3:43.14		2026 European Championships	Paris, France	16 August 2026	NR	
100 m backstroke	54.55		2024 CA Speedo Grand Challenge hosted by NOVA	Irvine, California, United States	26 May 2024		
200 m backstroke	1:57.14		2025 Indy Summer Cup	Indianapolis, Indiana, United States	28 June 2025		
100 m breaststroke	59.06		2024 CA Speedo Grand Challenge hosted by NOVA	Irvine, California, United States	24 May 2024		
200 m breaststroke	2:05.85		2024 Summer Olympics	Paris, France	31 July 2024	OR, ER	
100 m butterfly	51.20		2025 Toyota U.S. Open	Austin, Texas, United States	5 December 2025		
200 m butterfly	1:51.21		2024 Summer Olympics	Paris, France	31 July 2024	OR, NR	
200 m individual medley	1:52.69		2025 World Championships	Singapore	30 July 2025	WR	
400 m individual medley	4:02.50		2023 World Championships	Fukuoka, Japan	23 July 2023	WR	

Legend: WR – World record; ER – European record; NR – French record; e – equalled existing record; OR – Olympic record;
Records not set in finals: h – heat; sf – semifinal; r – relay 1st leg; rh – relay heat 1st leg; b – B final; † – en route to final mark; so – swim-off; tt – time trial

=== Short course metres (25 m pool) ===
Event	Time	Meet	Location	Date	Notes	Ref
100 m freestyle	47.46	2024 World Aquatics Swimming World Cup	Incheon, South Korea	25 October 2024		
200 m freestyle	1:40.91	2024 World Aquatics Swimming World Cup	Singapore	2 November 2024		
400 m freestyle	3:38.25	2025 World Aquatics Swimming World Cup	Carmel, United States	10 October 2025		
200 m backstroke	1:47.68	2025 World Aquatics Swimming World Cup	Carmel, United States	10 October 2025	NR	
200 m breaststroke	2:02.00	2025 World Aquatics Swimming World Cup	Carmel, United States	12 October 2025	NR	
100 m individual medley	49.92	2024 World Aquatics Swimming World Cup	Singapore	31 October 2024	ER	
200 m individual medley	1:48.88	2024 World Aquatics Swimming World Cup	Singapore	1 November 2024	WR	
400 m individual medley	3:58.30	2024 World Aquatics Swimming World Cup	Incheon, South Korea	26 October 2024	NR	

Legend: WR – World record; ER – European record; NR – French record; e – equalled existing record;
Records not set in finals: h – heat; sf – semifinal; r – relay 1st leg; rh – relay heat 1st leg; b – B final; † – en route to final mark; so – swim-off; tt – time trial

=== Short course yards (25 yd pool) ===
Event	Time		Meet	Location	Date	Notes	Ref
100 yd freestyle	40.28	r	2024 NCAA Division I Championships	Indianapolis, United States	30 March 2024		
200 yd freestyle	1:28.97	r	2024 NCAA Division I Championships	Indianapolis, United States	27 March 2024		
500 yd freestyle	4:02.31		2024 NCAA Division I Championships	Indianapolis, United States	28 March 2024	US	
200 yd breaststroke	1:46.35		2024 NCAA Division I Championships	Indianapolis, United States	30 March 2024	US	
200 yd individual medley	1:36.34		2023 NCAA Division I Championships	Minneapolis, United States	23 March 2023	US	
400 yd individual medley	3:28.82		2023 NCAA Division I Championships	Minneapolis, United States	24 March 2023	US	

Legend: US – U.S. Open record;

== Records ==
=== Continental, olympic and national records ===
==== Long course metres (50 m pool) ====
No.	Event	Time		Meet	Location	Date	Age	Type	Status	Ref
1	400 m individual medley	4:16.37		2019 World Junior Swimming Championships	Budapest, Hungary	24 August 2019	17	NR	Former	
2	400 m individual medley (2)	4:14.97		FFN Golden Tour – Marseille	Marseille	20 March 2021	18	NR	Former	
3	400 m individual medley (3)	4:09.65		2021 French Elite Swimming Championships	Chartres	15 June 2021	19	NR	Former	
4	400 m individual medley (4)	4:09.09	h	2022 World Aquatics Championships	Budapest, Hungary	18 June 2022	20	NR	Former	
5	400 m individual medley (5)	4:04.28		2022 World Aquatics Championships	Budapest, Hungary	18 June 2022	20	ER, NR	Former	
6	400 m individual medley (6)	4:02.95		2024 Summer Olympics	Paris, France	28 July 2024	22	OR	Current	
7	200 m individual medley	1:56.95		2022 Pro Swim Series – San Antonio	San Antonio, United States	2 April 2022	19	NR	Former	
8	200 m individual medley (2)	1:55.75	sf	2022 World Aquatics Championships	Budapest, Hungary	21 June 2022	20	NR	Former	
9	200 m individual medley (3)	1:55.22		2022 World Aquatics Championships	Budapest, Hungary	22 June 2022	20	NR	Former	
10	200 m individual medley (4)	1:54.82		2023 World Aquatics Championships	Fukuoka, Japan	27 July 2023	21	ER, NR	Former	
11	200 m individual medley (5)	1:54.06		2024 Summer Olympics	Paris, France	2 August 2024	22	OR	Current	
12	200 m butterfly	1:54.32	sf	2022 World Aquatics Championships	Budapest, Hungary	20 June 2022	20	NR	Former	
13	200 m butterfly (2)	1:53.37		2022 World Aquatics Championships	Budapest, Hungary	21 June 2022	20	NR	Former	
14	200 m butterfly (3)	1:52.43		2023 World Aquatics Championships	Fukuoka, Japan	26 July 2023	21	NR	Former	
15	200 m breaststroke	2:08.76		2022 Spanish Summer Championships	Sabadell, Spain	23 July 2022	20	NR	Former	
16	200 m breaststroke (2)	2:06.59		2023 French Elite Championships	Rennes	11 June 2023	21	NR	Former	

Legend: WR – World record; ER – European record; NR – French record; e – equalled existing record; OR – Olympic record;
Records not set in finals: h – heat; sf – semifinal; r – relay 1st leg; rh – relay heat 1st leg; b – B final; † – en route to final mark; so – swim-off; tt – time trial

==== Short course metres (25 m pool) ====
No.	Event	Time		Meet	Location	Date	Age	Type	Status	Ref
1	400 m individual medley	4:00.03		2024 World Aquatics Swimming World Cup	Shanghai, China	20 October 2024	22	NR	Former	
2	200 m individual medley	1:53.53	h	2024 World Aquatics Swimming World Cup	Shanghai, China	19 October 2024	22	NR	Former	
3	200 m individual medley (2)	1:50.30		2024 World Aquatics Swimming World Cup	Shanghai, China	19 October 2024	22	ER, NR	Former	
4	100 m individual medley	50.65		2024 World Aquatics Swimming World Cup	Shanghai, China	18 October 2024	22	NR	Former	

Legend: WR – World record; ER – European record; NR – French record; e – equalled existing record;
Records not set in finals: h – heat; sf – semifinal; r – relay 1st leg; rh – relay heat 1st leg; b – B final; † – en route to final mark; so – swim-off; tt – time trial

=== US Open records ===
==== Short course yards (25 yd pool) ====
No.	Event	Time	Meet	Location	Date	Age	Status	Ref
1	200 yd individual medley	1:37.69	2022 NCAA Division I Championships	Atlanta, United States	24 March 2022	19	Former	
2	400 yd individual medley	3:31.84	2023 Cal vs. ASU Dual Meet	Tempe, United States	21 January 2023	20	Former	
3	400 yd individual medley (2)	3:31.57	2023 Pac-12 Conference Championships	Federal Way, United States	3 March 2023	20	Former	
4	200 yd breaststroke	1:47.67	2023 Pac-12 Conference Championships	Federal Way, United States	4 March 2023	20	Former	
5	200 yd individual medley (2)	1:36.34	2023 NCAA Division I Championships	Minneapolis, United States	23 March 2023	20	Current	
6	400 yd individual medley (3)	3:28.82	2023 NCAA Division I Championships	Minneapolis, United States	24 March 2023	20	Current	
7	200 yd breaststroke (2)	1:46.91	2023 NCAA Division I Championships	Minneapolis, United States	25 March 2023	20	Former	
8	500 yd freestyle	4:06.18	2024 Pac-12 Conference Championships	Federal Way, United States	7 March 2024	21	Former	
9	200 yd freestyle	1:28.97	2024 NCAA Division I Championships	Indianapolis, United States	27 March 2024	21	Former	
10	500 yd freestyle (2)	4:02.31	2024 NCAA Division I Championships	Indianapolis, United States	28 March 2024	21	Current	
11	200 yd breaststroke (3)	1:46.35	2024 NCAA Division I Championships	Indianapolis, United States	30 March 2024	21	Current	

== Awards and honours ==
- Pac-12 Conference, Swimmer of the Year (Men's): 2021–2022
- Pac-12 Conference, Freshman of the Year (Men's): 2021–2022
- College Swimming and Diving Coaches Association of America (CSCAA), Swimmer of the Year (Men's): 2022
- SwimSwam, Swammy Award, NCAA Swimmer of the Meet (Men's): 2022
- SwimSwam, Swammy Award, NCAA Freshman of the Year (Men's): 2022
- World Aquatics Championships, Best Male Swimmer: 2022, 2023 & 2025
- Pac-12 Conference, Swimmer of the Meet (Men's): 2023
- SwimSwam, Swammy Award European Male Swimmer of the Year: 2023, 2024 & 2025
- Swimming World, Swimmer of the Year (male): 2023, 2024 & 2025
- SwimSwam, Swammy Award Male Swimmer of the Year: 2024 & 2025
- World Aquatics, Athlete of the Year (Men's) : 2024 & 2025
- European Aquatics, Athlete of the Year (Men's) : 2024
- Time 100 by Time magazine: 2025

Orders

- Knight of the Legion of Honour: 2024

Records
Preceded by (United States) Michael Phelps	Men's 400-metre individual medley world record-holder (long course); 23 July 2023 – present	Succeeded by Incumbent
Preceded by (United States) Ryan Lochte	Men's 200-metre individual medley world record-holder (long course); 30 July 2025 – present	Succeeded by Incumbent
