= 2024 NCAA Division I Men's Swimming and Diving Championships =

- Host city: Indianapolis, Indiana
- Date: March 27–30, 2024
- Venue(s): Indiana University Natatorium; Indiana University–Purdue University Indianapolis

The 2024 NCAA Division I Men's Swimming and Diving Championships were contested March 27–30, 2024 at the 100th annual NCAA-sanctioned swim meet to determine the team and individual national champions of Division I men's collegiate swimming and diving in the United States.

This year's events were hosted by Indiana University–Purdue University Indianapolis at the Indiana University Natatorium in Indianapolis, Indiana.

== Team standings ==
- Note: Top 10 only
- (H) = Hosts
- ^{(DC)} = Defending champions

Rank	Team	Points
1st place, gold medalist(s)	Arizona State	523.5
2nd place, silver medalist(s)	California^{(DC)}	444.5
3rd place, bronze medalist(s)	Florida	378
4	Indiana (H)	376
5	NC State	318
6	Tennessee	231
7	Texas	189
8	Stanford	177
9	Virginia Tech	172
10	Notre Dame	132

== Swimming results ==
Full Results

Event	Gold		Silver		Bronze	
50 freestyle	Josh Liendo; Florida	18.07	Jordan Crooks; Tennessee	18.09	Jack Alexy; California	18.38
100 freestyle	Josh Liendo; Florida	40.20	Guilherme Caribé; Tennessee	40.55	Jack Alexy; California	40.59
200 freestyle	Luke Hobson; Texas	1:28.81; US, AR	Jack Alexy; California	1:29.75	Chris Guiliano; Notre Dame	1:30.38
500 freestyle	Léon Marchand; Arizona State	4:02.31; US	Luke Hobson; Texas	4:06.93	Jake Magahey; Georgia	4:07.12
1650 freestyle	Zalan Sarkany; Arizona State	14:30.57	Gio Linscheer; Florida	14:36.01	Andrew Taylor; Florida	14:37.80
100 backstroke	Brendan Burns; Indiana	43.86	Kacper Stokowski; NC State	43.89	Adam Chaney; Florida	43.99
200 backstroke	Destin Lasco; California	1:35.37; US, AR	Hubert Kós; Arizona State	1:35.90	Owen McDonald; Arizona State	1:36.63
100 breaststroke	Liam Bell; California	49.53; US, AR	Brian Benzing; Towson	50.59	Denis Petrashov; Louisville	50.91
200 breaststroke	Léon Marchand; Arizona State	1:46.35; US	Matthew Fallon; Pennsylvania	1:48.48	Carles Coll Marti; Virginia Tech	1:49.99
100 butterfly	Josh Liendo; Florida	43.07	Tomer Frankel; Indiana	43.85	Luke Miller; NC State	43.90
200 butterfly	Ilya Kharun; Arizona State	1:38.26	Dare Rose; California	1:38.61	Aiden Hayes; NC State	1:39.16
200 IM	Destin Lasco; California	1:37.91; AR	Owen McDonald; Arizona State	1:39.23	Hubert Kós; Arizona State	1:39.66
400 IM	Léon Marchand; Arizona State	3:32.12	David Schlicht; Arizona State	3:35.27	Baylor Nelson; Texas A&M	3:37.46
200 freestyle relay	Florida; Josh Liendo (18.25); Adam Chaney (18.29); Julian Smith (18.51); Macguire McDuff (18.44)	1:13.49	California; Jack Alexy (18.40); Bjorn Seeliger (18.43); Liam Bell (18.46); Destin Lasco (18.57)	1:13.86	Arizona State; Jack Dolan (18.80); Ilya Kharun (18.48); Cam Peel (18.56); Jonny Kulow (18.11)	1:13.95
400 freestyle relay	Arizona State; Léon Marchand (40.28); Jack Dolan (41.28); Patrick Sammon (41.02); Jonny Kulow (40.82)	2:43.40; US	Florida; Josh Liendo (41.28); Adam Chaney (40.80); Julian Smith (41.30); Macguire McDuff (40.83)	2:44.21	California; Jack Alexy (40.79); Destin Lasco (41.91); Matthew Jensen (41.11); Bjorn Seeliger (40.65)	2:44.46
800 freestyle relay	California; Gabriel Jett (1:30.32); Destin Lasco (1:29.60); Jack Alexy (1:30.50); Robin Hanson (1:31.84)	6:02.26; US	Arizona State; Léon Marchand (1:28.97) US; Hubert Kós (1:32.29); Patrick Sammon (1:31.91); Julian Hill (1:31.78)	6:04.95	Texas; Luke Hobson (1:29.13) AR; Coby Carrozza (1:31.32); Nate Germonprez (1:32.05); Camden Taylor (1:32.83)	6:05.33
200 medley relay	Florida; Adam Chaney (20.29); Julian Smith (22.55); Josh Liendo (18.97); Macguire McDuff (18.34)	1:20.15; US	Arizona State; Jack Dolan (20.55); Léon Marchand (22.59); Ilya Kharun (19.47); Jonny Kulow (17.94)	1:20.55	NC State; Aiden Hayes (20.07); Sam Hoover (23.40); Luke Miller (19.35); Quintin McCarty (18.16)	1:20.98; AR
400 medley relay	Arizona State; Hubert Kós (44.61); Léon Marchand (48.73); Ilya Kharun (43.44); Jonny Kulow (40.54)	2:57.32; US	California; Destin Lasco (44.13); Liam Bell (49.70); Dare Rose (44.17); Bjorn Seeliger (40.30)	2:58.30	NC State; Kacper Stokowski (43.57); Sam Hoover (51.37); Luke Miller (43.55); Quintin McCarty (41.22)	2:59.71

Legend: US – U.S. Open record; AR – American record;

== Diving results ==
Event	Gold		Silver		Bronze	
1 m diving	Lyle Yost; Ohio State	433.55	Quentin Henninger; Indiana	427.20	Carson Tyler; Indiana	412.95
3 m diving	Carson Tyler; Indiana	476.85	Quentin Henninger; Indiana	461.75	Jack Ryan; Stanford	444.20
Platform diving	Carson Tyler; Indiana	515.75	Maxwell Weinrich; Indiana	450.70	Bryden Hattie; Tennessee	444.60

== See also ==
- List of college swimming and diving teams
- 2024 NCAA Division I Women's Swimming and Diving Championships
