= Swimming at the 2024 European Aquatics Championships – Men's 800 metre freestyle =

Men's 800 metre freestyle at the 2024 European Aquatics Championships
- Venue: Sports Centre Milan Gale Muškatirović
- Dates: 18 June (heats); 19 June (final)
- Winning time: 7:46.20

Medalists
gold medal	Mykhailo Romanchuk	Ukraine
silver medal	Dimitrios Markos	Greece
bronze medal	Zalán Sárkány	Hungary

The Men's 800 metre freestyle competition of the 2024 European Aquatics Championships was held on 18 and 19 June 2024.

== Records ==
Prior to the competition, the existing world, European and championship records were as follows.

	Name	Nation	Time	Location	Date
World record	Zhang Lin	China	7:32.12	Rome	29 July 2009
European record	Daniel Wiffen	Ireland	7:39.19	Fukuoka	26 July 2023
Championship record	Gregorio Paltrinieri	Italy	7:40.86	Rome	13 August 2022

== Results ==
=== Heats ===
The heats were started on 18 June at 10:35.
Qualification Rules: The 8 fastest from the heats qualify to the final.

Rank	Heat	Lane	Name	Nationality	Time	Notes
1	3	4	Mykhailo Romanchuk	Ukraine	7:48.22	Q
2	3	6	Zalán Sárkány	Hungary	7:50.36	Q
3	3	3	Dimitrios Markos	Greece	7:50.38	Q
4	3	2	Krzysztof Chmielewski	Poland	7:50.51	Q
5	2	4	Kuzey Tunçelli	Turkey	7:53.92	Q
6	2	3	Nathan Wiffen	Ireland	7:54.60	Q
7	2	6	Muhammed Özden	Turkey	7:55.56	Q
8	2	5	Henrik Christiansen	Norway	7:55.62	Q
9	3	5	Jon Jøntvedt	Norway	8:01.04	
10	2	7	Džiugas Miškinis	Lithuania	8:04.06	
11	2	1	Marin Mogić	Croatia	8:08.63	
12	3	8	Nikola Ratkov	Serbia	8:09.34	
13	2	2	László Gálicz	Hungary	8:11.78	
14	3	9	Loris Bianchi	San Marino	8:12.19	NR
15	2	0	Filip Kuruzović	Bosnia and Herzegovina	8:12.37	
16	1	4	Mihailo Gašić	Serbia	8:16.14	
17	2	8	Michal Judickij	Czech Republic	8:16.66	
18	3	0	Nikola Simić	Serbia	8:18.33	
19	3	7	Bartosz Kapala	Poland	8:18.51	
20	2	9	Kevin Pereira Teixeira	Andorra	8:21.90	
21	3	1	Yordan Yanchev	Bulgaria	8:24.04	
22	1	5	Nikola Ǵuretanoviḱ	North Macedonia	8:31.13	
	1	3	Jovan Lekić	Bosnia and Herzegovina	Did not start	

=== Final ===
The final was held on 19 June at 20:07.

Rank	Lane	Name	Nationality	Time	Notes
1st place, gold medalist(s)	4	Mykhailo Romanchuk	Ukraine	7:46.20	
2nd place, silver medalist(s)	3	Dimitrios Markos	Greece	7:48.59	NR
3rd place, bronze medalist(s)	5	Zalán Sárkány	Hungary	7:49.29	
4	6	Krzysztof Chmielewski	Poland	7:49.44	
5	8	Henrik Christiansen	Norway	7:50.88	
6	2	Kuzey Tunçelli	Turkey	7:54.12	
7	1	Muhammed Özden	Turkey	7:55.32	
8	7	Nathan Wiffen	Ireland	8:03.74	
