= Kuzey Tunçelli =

Turkish swimmer (born 2007)

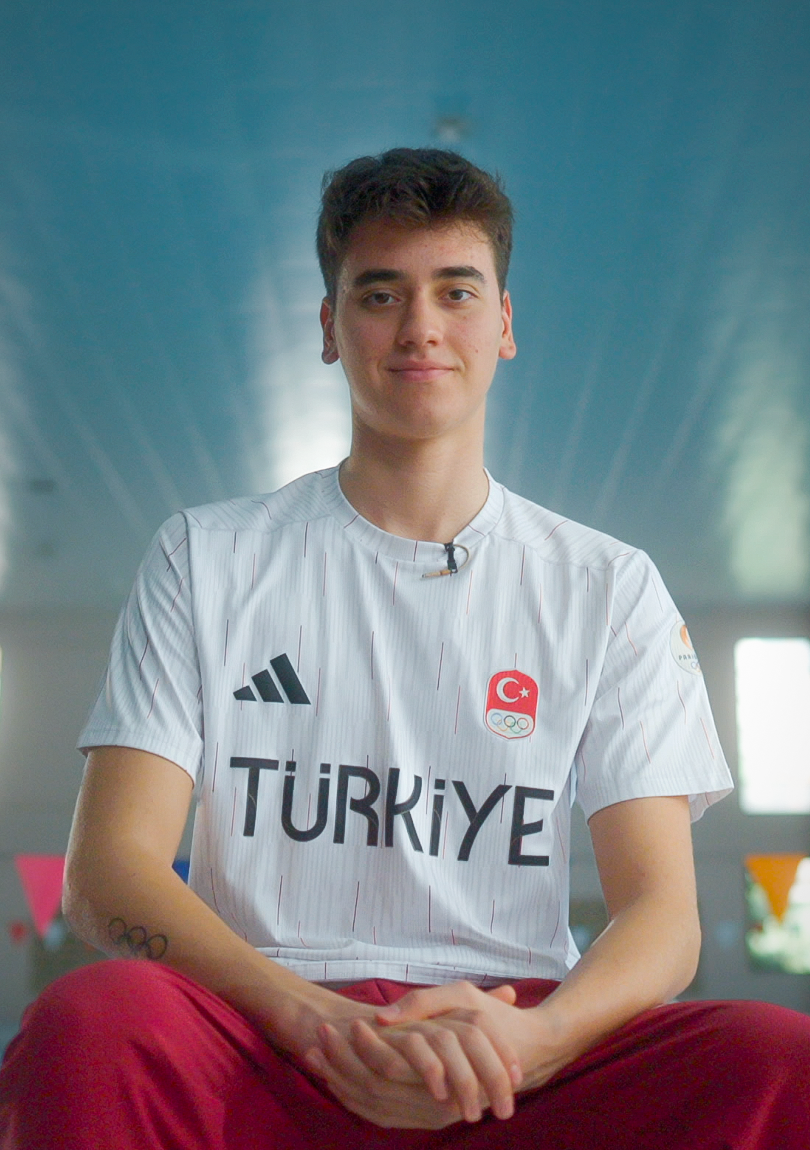

Personal information
- Nationality: Turkey
- Born: 30 August 2007 (age 18) Kocaeli, Turkey
- Height: 1.86 m (6 ft 1 in)

Sport
- Country: Turkey
- Sport: Swimming
- Event: Freestyle
- Club: Fenerbahçe Swimming
- Coached by: Aykut Çelik
Medal record
Men's swimming
Representing Turkey
World Championships (SC)
Bronze medal – third place	2024 Budapest	1500 m freestyle
European Championships (LC)
Gold medal – first place	2024 Belgrade	1500 m freestyle
Islamic Solidarity Games
Gold medal – first place	2025 Riyadh	1500 m freestyle
Gold medal – first place	2025 Riyadh	4×200 m freestyle
Silver medal – second place	2025 Riyadh	400 m freestyle
World Junior Championships
Gold medal – first place	2023 Netanya	800 m freestyle
Gold medal – first place	2023 Netanya	1500 m freestyle
Gold medal – first place	2025 Otopeni	800 m freestyle
Gold medal – first place	2025 Otopeni	1500 m freestyle
European Junior Championships
Gold medal – first place	2023 Belgrade	1500 m freestyle
Gold medal – first place	2024 Vilnius	800 m freestyle
Gold medal – first place	2024 Vilnius	1500 m freestyle
Gold medal – first place	2025 Šamorín	800 m freestyle
Gold medal – first place	2025 Šamorín	1500 m freestyle
Bronze medal – third place	2023 Belgrade	800 m freestyle
Bronze medal – third place	2024 Vilnius	4x200 m freestyle
Bronze medal – third place	2025 Šamorín	400 m freestyle
Bronze medal – third place	2025 Šamorín	4x200 m freestyle
European Youth Summer Olympic Festival
Gold medal – first place	2023 Maribor	1500 m freestyle

Kuzey Tunçelli (born 30 August 2007) is a Turkish competitive swimmer. He holds both World Junior Records in long course and short course 1500-meter freestyle events.

Tunçelli became both the Junior European and European champion in the 1500-meter freestyle in 2024 and the first Turkish swimmer ever to reach finals in the history of the Olympics, finishing 5th and breaking his own long course World Junior Record at the Paris 2024 Olympics.

Coached by Aykut Çelik in Kocaeli at their own pool, he specializes in 800-meter and 1500-meter freestyle swimming events and currently swims for Fenerbahçe SK, located in Istanbul, Turkey.

== Senior-level international competitions ==
Year	Competition	Venue	Position	Event	Notes
Representing Turkey
2024	2024 European Aquatics Championships	Belgrade, Serbia	6th	800 m free	7:54.12
2024	2024 European Aquatics Championships	Belgrade, Serbia	1st	1500 m free	14:55.64
2024	2024 Summer Olympics	Paris, France	11th	800 m free	7:47.29
2024	2024 Summer Olympics	Paris, France	5th	1500 m free	14:41.22
2024	2024 World Aquatics Swimming Championships (25 m)	Budapest, Hungary	16th	800 m free	7:42.39
2024	2024 World Aquatics Swimming Championships (25 m)	Budapest, Hungary	3rd	1500 m free	14:20.64
2025	2025 World Aquatics Championships	Singapore	6th	800 m free	7:49.09
2025	2025 World Aquatics Championships	Singapore	6th	1500 m free	14:52.44

== Personal bests ==
Long Course (50 m)

- 800 m freestyle – 7:46.52 (Otopeni, August 2025)
- 1500 m freestyle – 14:41.22 (Paris, August 2024)

Short Course (25 m)

- 800 m freestyle – 7:38.76 (Budapest, December 2024)
- 1500 m freestyle – 14:20.64 (Budapest, December 2024)

== Swimming career ==
Born in Kocaeli, Turkey as the only child to Oylum, an academic, and Melih Tunçelli, a former banking professional, Kuzey Tunçelli started swimming at age 5. His first club was Yıldızlar Swimming Club, a sports club specializing in swimming, where he took his first swimming lessons from Kamer Gözüm and met his coach, Aykut Çetin. He has been a licensed athlete of Fenerbahçe SK since November 2021.

=== 2021 ===
Tunçelli broke his first record at the age of 14, with a time of 15:05.25 in the 1500 m freestyle at the Turkey Turkcell Short Course Junior Individual Swimming Championship held in Istanbul. With this time, he improved the Turkish record in his age category by 25 seconds. He also won the "Best Athlete of the Tournament Award" at the same tournament.

In December, he was selected for the national team for the first time by breaking the record with a time of 15:38.05 in the 1500 m freestyle at the Turkey Şehit Kamil Turkcell Star-Youth and Open Age Long Course National Team Selections held in Gaziantep.

=== 2022 ===
In July, he finished 8th at the 2022 European Junior Swimming Championships held in Bucharest, Romania. A week later, he broke the record in the 1500 m with a time of 15:14.04 at the Turkey Arena Inter-Club Long Course Junior and Open Age Swimming Championships and Youth Individual Swimming Championships in Istanbul.

=== 2023 ===
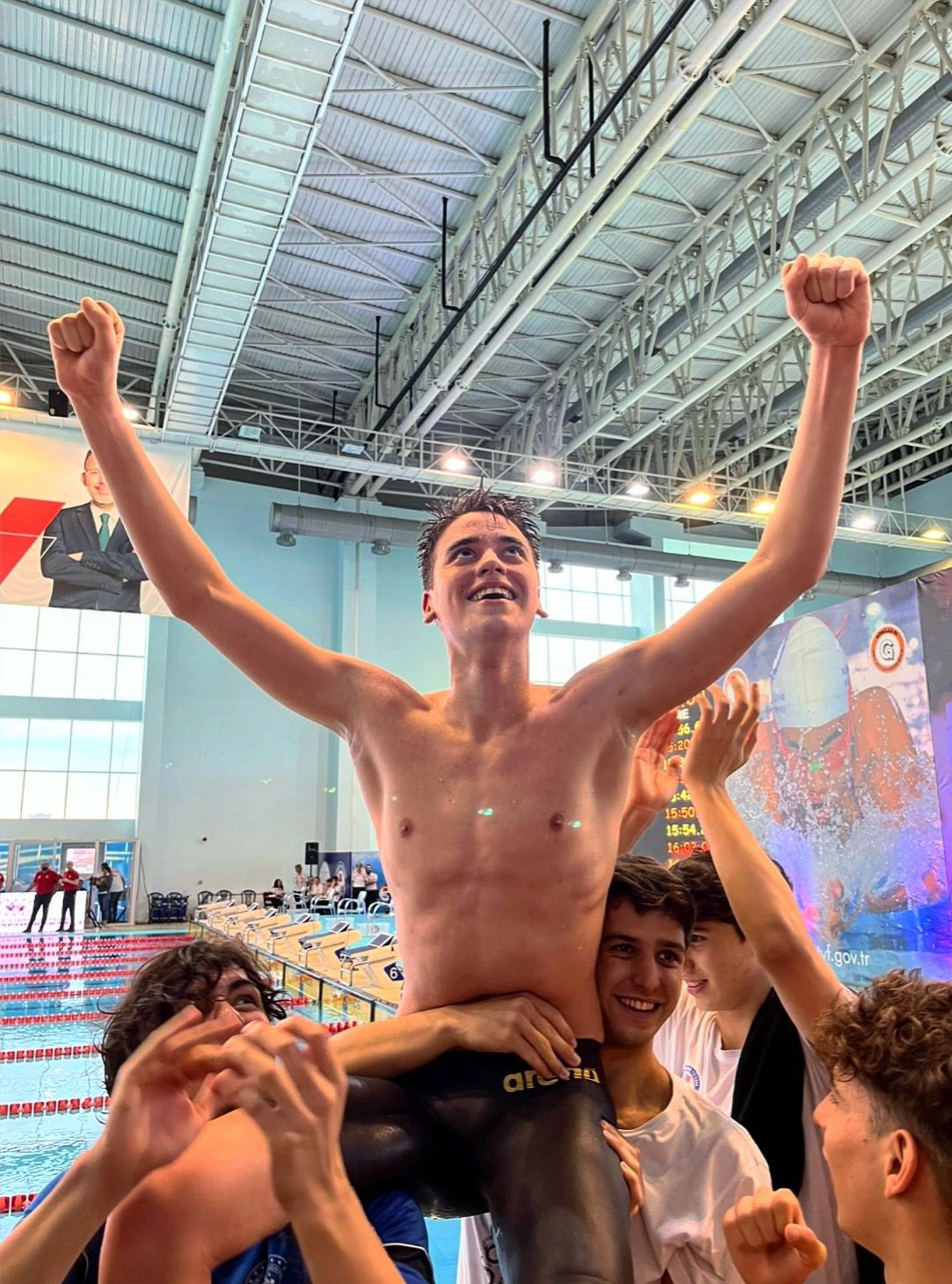
Kuzey Tunçelli with his teammates after receiving the Olympic quota.

In April 2023, at the Turkish National Team Trials for the Olympics held in Edirne, Tunçelli became the first swimmer 15 years old or under, with a time under 15 minutes for the 1500-meter freestyle event in the world. This title was previously held by Croatian swimmer Franko Grgic, who was 16 years and 44 days old. Tunçelli still holds this title. At the same meet, he qualified to represent his country at the Paris 2024 Olympics after he achieved a time of 14:56:67 in the 1500-m freestyle.

In the European Junior Championships held in Belgrade in July, he broke the championship record in the 1500-meter freestyle and came in first. Tunçelli, who also swam in the 800-meter freestyle final, came in third in the European Juniors with a time of 07:52.39.

He won the gold medal in the 1500-meter freestyle swimming event at the 2023 European Youth Summer Olympic Festival in Maribor, Slovenia, and set a Festival record for boys with 14:54.16 on 25 July 2023.

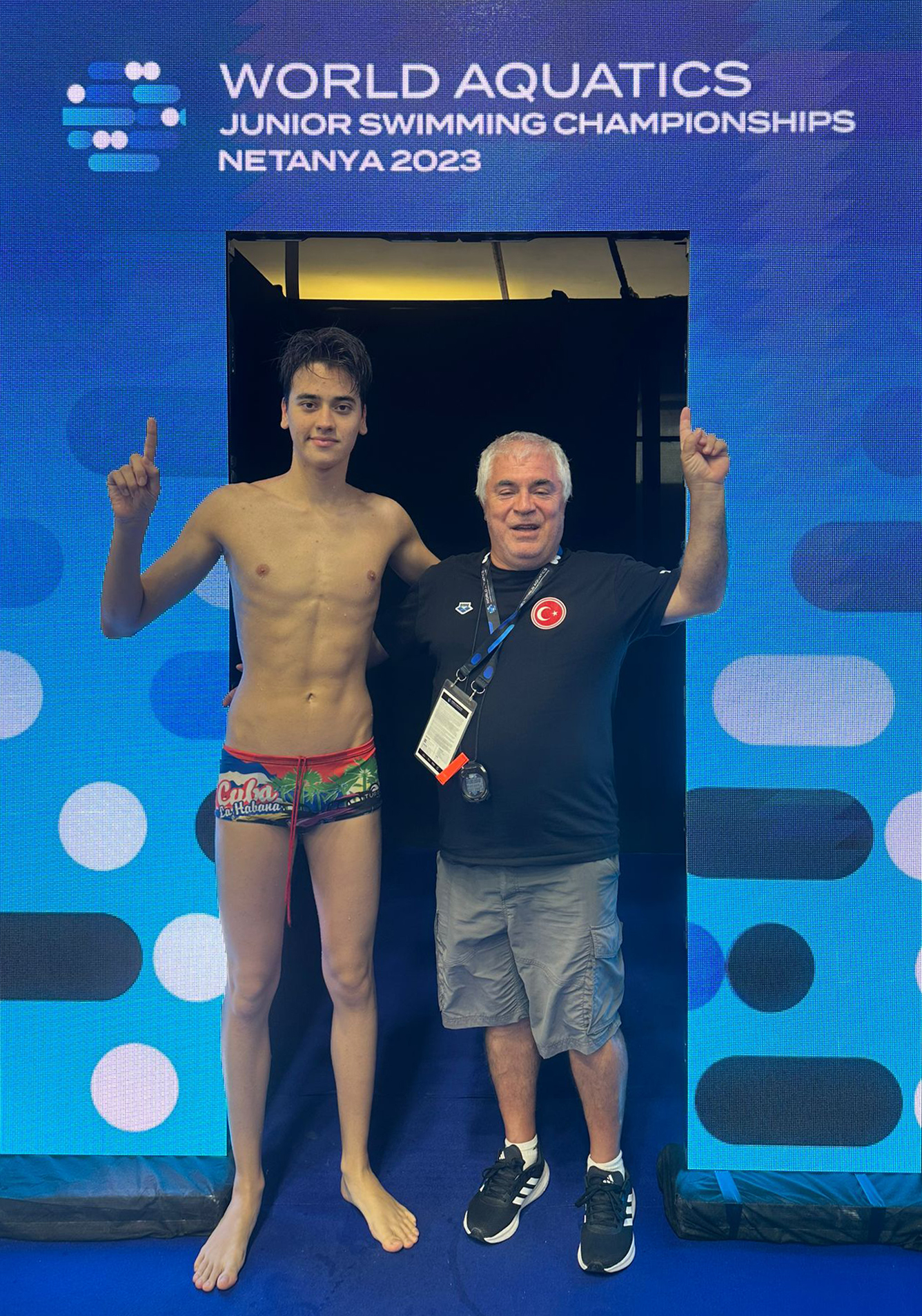
Kuzey Tunçelli with his coach Aykut Çelik at the 2023 World Junior Championship held in Netanya.

In September, he came first in both the 800m and 1500m freestyle races at the 2023 World Aquatics Junior Swimming Championships, held in Netanya, Israel. Thus, he passed the Olympic A threshold in the 800m and earned the right to swim in two different distances at the Paris 2024 Summer Olympics.

=== 2024 ===
Tunçelli participated in the 2024 World Aquatics Championships held in Doha in February. He swam in the final of the 1500m freestyle for the first time and finished 8th in the world with a time of 14:59.76.

In June 2024, he became the 1500-meter freestyle European champion in Belgrade.

In July 2024, he won the gold medal in both the 800-meter and 1500-meter freestyle at the Junior European Swimming Championships, setting a WJR in the 1500-meter as well as leading his team of Eren Kuru, Ahmet Burak Işık, and Tuncer Berk Ertürk to a bronze in the 4 x 200-meter freestyle relay.

At the 2024 Summer Olympics held in Paris, Tunçelli came second in his heat with a time of 7:47.29 in the 800m freestyle on July 29. He broke the Turkish record but did not make it to the finals, coming in 11th in the overall ranking.

In the 1500 m freestyle heats held at La Défense Arena on August 3, he finished his heat first with a time of 14:45.27 and advanced to the finals by coming in 5th overall, making history as Turkey's first athlete to advance to the finals in a swimming event at the Olympics.

Tunçelli, who finished the 1500m freestyle final on August 4th in the Olympics in 5th place, improved his own "World Junior Record" by 67 milliseconds with a time of 14:41.22.

Tunçelli also participated in the 10 km Men's Open Water Marathon Final for the first time in the Olympics and finished the race held on the Seine River in 23rd place with a time of 2:02:58.1.

In December 2024, Tunçelli set a world junior and Turkish record and won bronze in the men’s 1500 freestyle in Budapest, smashing Gregorio Paltrinieri’s official world junior record of 14:27.78, which had stood since the 2012 European Championships.

=== 2025 ===
Tunçelli won gold medals in the 800 m and 1500 m freestyle events at the European Junior Swimming Championships held in Šamorín in July, becoming the European Champion in the 1500 m for the third consecutive time. In the 800 m freestyle, he claimed his second consecutive European title, breaking both the games record and the Turkish national record. He also won bronze medals in the 400 m and 4 × 200 m freestyle events at the same championship.

== Awards ==
- October 2023: Piotr Nurowski Best European Young Athlete Award from the Association of European Olympic Committees (Shared the award with German rhythmic gymnast Darja Varfolomeev.)
- November 2024: Mustafa V. Koç Sports Award (Shared the award with the Turkey women's national goalball team.)
