= Lukas Märtens =

German swimmer (born 2001)

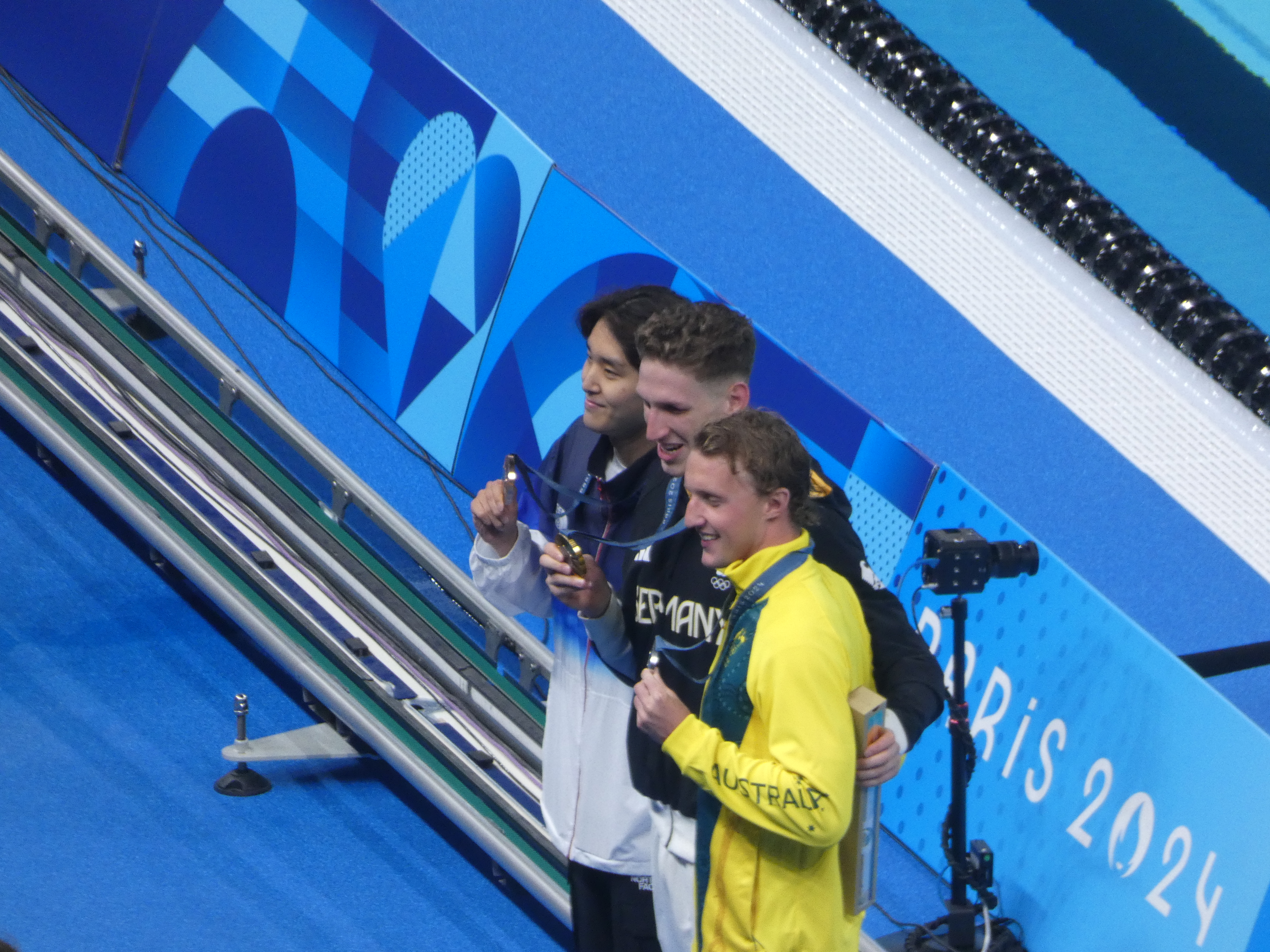
- Märtens (centre) at the 2024 Summer Olympics

Personal information
- Born: 27 December 2001 (age 24) Magdeburg, Saxony-Anhalt, Germany
- Height: 1.92 m (6 ft 4 in)
- Weight: 75 kg (165 lb)

Sport
- Sport: Swimming
- Strokes: Freestyle
Medal record
Men's swimming
Representing Germany
Olympic Games
| Gold medal – first place | 2024 Paris | 400 m freestyle |
World Championships (LC)
| Gold medal – first place | 2025 Singapore | 400 m freestyle |
| Silver medal – second place | 2022 Budapest | 400 m freestyle |
| Bronze medal – third place | 2023 Fukuoka | 400 m freestyle |
| Bronze medal – third place | 2024 Doha | 400 m freestyle |
| Bronze medal – third place | 2025 Singapore | 800 m freestyle |
European Championships (LC)
| Gold medal – first place | 2022 Rome | 400 m freestyle |
| Silver medal – second place | 2022 Rome | 800 m freestyle |
| Silver medal – second place | 2026 Paris | 4×200 m mixed freestyle |
| Bronze medal – third place | 2026 Paris | 4×200 m freestyle |
| Bronze medal – third place | 2026 Paris | 400 m freestyle |
European Championships (SC)
| Silver medal – second place | 2025 Lublin | 400 m freestyle |

Lukas Märtens (born 27 December 2001) is a German swimmer. He is the reigning 400m freestyle Olympic champion.

== Career ==
=== 2021 ===
In July 2021, Märtens competed at the 2020 Olympics in Tokyo. His first event was the 400 m freestyle, where he finished twelfth in a time of 3:46.30. He then competed in the 200 m freestyle, finishing seventeenth with a time of 1:46.69. He then swam the first leg of the 4 × 200 m freestyle relay, splitting 1:46.68 to help Germany finish seventh overall. Märtens' final event was the 1500 m freestyle, where he recorded a time of 14:59.45 to finish eleventh.

In December 2021, Märtens competed at the 2021 World Championships (25 m) in Abu Dhabi. He finished twenty-second in 400 m freestyle in a time of 3:43.64. He then swam the 200 m freestyle, finishing thirtieth in a time of 1:46.52. His final event was the 1500 m freestyle, where he recorded a time of 14:37.60 to finish ninth, missing the final by 1.33 seconds.

=== 2022 ===
In March 2022, Märtens competed at the Gothaer & Friends Meet in Magdeburg, and achieved a personal best time of 14:40.28 in the 1500 m freestyle.

In April 2022, Märtens competed at the Stockholm Open, recording a personal best of 3:41.60 in the 400 m freestyle. This was the fastest time in the event globally since 2017. He then won the 200 m freestyle in a personal best time of 1:45.44. He concluded the competition with a German record in the 800 m freestyle, recording a time of 7:41.43 to surpass Florian Wellbrock's mark of 7:41.77 from 2021.

In June 2022, Märtens competed at the 2022 World Championships in Budapest. He won the silver medal in the 400 m freestyle in a time of 3:42.85. He then competed in the 200 m freestyle, where he finished seventh in a time of 1:45.73. Despite going into the 800 m freestyle with the second-fastest qualifying time, Märtens finished fourteenth in the heats in a time of 7:55.21 and did not qualify for the final. He also lost his national record to Wellbrock. Märtens' final event was the 1500 m freestyle, where he finished fourth in a time of 14:40.89.

In August 2022, Märtens competed at the 2022 European Championships in Rome. He swam the first leg of the 4 × 200 m freestyle relay, splitting 1:46.22 to contribute to Germany's final time of 7:13.58. His team finished seventh overall. He then won the silver medal in the 800 m freestyle with a time of 7:42.65. He then won the 400 m freestyle in a time of 3:42.50, breaking the championship record of 3:44.01 set by Italian Gabriele Detti in 2016.

=== 2023 ===
In July 2023, Märtens competed at the 2023 World Championships in Fukuoka. In the 400 m freestyle, he won the bronze medal in a time of 3:42.20. He then swam the 800 m freestyle, finishing fifth in the event. His time of 7:39.48 reclaimed the national record from Wellbrock, and he surpassed the previous mark by 0.22 seconds. In the 4 × 200 m freestyle relay, he swam the first leg in a personal best time of 1:44.79. Germany finished seventh overall in a time of 7:06.14. In the 1500 m freestyle, Märtens finished fifth in a time of 14:44.51.

=== 2024 ===
In February 2024, Märtens competed at the 2024 World Championships in Doha. He won the bronze medal in the 400 m freestyle in a time of 3:42.96. He then came fifth in the 200 m freestyle, recording a time of 1:45.33. His final event was the 200 m backstroke, where he posted 1:58.24 to finish thirteenth.

In April 2024, Märtens competed at the German Championships in Berlin. He achieved a personal best in the 400 m freestyle, recording a time of 3:40.33. In the 200 m freestyle, he recorded 1:44.14 to achieve another personal best. Märtens then swam a personal best in the 200 m backstroke, winning in a time of 1:56.00.

At the 2024 Olympics in Paris, Märtens won the gold medal in the 400 m freestyle with a time of 3:41.78. He then competed in the 200 m freestyle, recording a time of 1:45.46 to finish fifth. He swam in the 4 × 200 m freestyle relay, splitting 1:45.31 on the first leg to put Germany in second place at the 200 m mark. His team eventually finished eighth in a time of 7:09.56. In the 200 m backstroke, Märtens recorded 1:55.97 to finish eighth.

=== 2025 ===
In April 2025, Märtens competed at the Stockholm Open. He went 3:39.96 in the 400 m freestyle, breaking the world record of 3:40.07 set by compatriot Paul Biedermann in 2009. The following day, he won the 200 m freestyle in a time of 1:45.55. He then set a new German record in the 800 m freestyle with a time of 7:39.10.

In July 2025, Märtens competed at the 2025 World Championships in Singapore. He won the gold medal in the 400 m freestyle with a time of 3:42.35, 0.02 ahead of the silver medalist. His next event was the 800 m freestyle, where he recorded 7:40.19 to win the bronze medal. In the 200 m backstroke, he came twentieth in a time of 1:57.31. He swam the first leg of the 4 × 200 m freestyle relay, splitting 1:45.65 to help Germany finish ninth in a time of 7:07.54, missing the final by 0.66 seconds. His final event was the 4 × 100 m medley relay. He split 54.96 on the backstroke leg in the heats, however, Germany was disqualified for an early relay exchange.

In December 2025, Märtens competed at the 2025 European Short Course Championships in Lublin, swimming in two events. He won the silver medal in the 400 m freestyle with a personal best time of 3:36.51. He then came tenth in the 200 m freestyle in a time of 1:42.28.

=== 2026 ===
In April 2026, Märtens set a new German record in the 200 m backstroke, setting a time of 1:55.85, breaking Jan-Philip Glania's 2012 mark by 0.02 seconds.

Records
| Preceded by (Germany) Paul Biedermann | Men's 400-metre freestyle world record-holder (long course); 12 April 2025 – present | Succeeded by Incumbent |
