= Johannes Liebmann =

German swimmer (born 2007)

Personal information
- Full name: Johannes Wilhelm Liebmann
- Nationality: German
- Born: 21 March 2007 (age 19) Eckernförde, Schleswig-Holstein, Germany

Sport
- Sport: Swimming
- Strokes: Freestyle
Medal record
Men's swimming
Representing Germany
European Championships (LC)
Gold medal – first place	2026 Paris	800 m freestyle
Gold medal – first place	2026 Paris	1500 m freestyle
European Junior Championships
Silver medal – second place	2024 Vilnius	1500 m freestyle
Silver medal – second place	2024 Vilnius	4x200 m freestyle
Silver medal – second place	2025 Šamorín	400 m freestyle
Silver medal – second place	2025 Šamorín	1500 m freestyle
Bronze medal – third place	2024 Vilnius	400 m freestyle
Bronze medal – third place	2024 Vilnius	800 m freestyle
Bronze medal – third place	2025 Šamorín	800 m freestyle

Johannes Wilhelm Liebmann (born 21 March 2007) is a German swimmer.

== Career ==
Liebmann competed at the 2024 European Junior Swimming Championships and won silver medals in the 4×200 metre freestyle relay and 1500 metre freestyle, and bronze medals in the 400 metre and 800 metre freestyle events. He again competed at the 2025 European Junior Swimming Championships and won silver medals in the 400 metre and 1500 metre freestyle and a bronze medal in the 800 metre freestyle.

In December 2025, he competed at the 2025 European Short Course Swimming Championships and set a world junior record time in the 800 metre freestyle heats with a time of 7:30.47. In August 2026, he competed at the 2026 European Aquatics Championships and won a gold medal in the 800 metre freestyle with a European and European Championships record time of 7:37.59. He also won a gold medal in the 1500 metre freestyle with a world record time of 14:26.79, taking 3.88 seconds off Bobby Finke's world record from the 2024 Summer Olympics.
