= Lorenzo Galossi =

Italian swimmer (born 2006)

Personal information
- National team: Italy
- Born: 25 May 2006 (age 20) Rome, Italy
- Height: 190 cm (6 ft 3 in)
- Weight: 84 kg (185 lb)

Sport
- Sport: Swimming
- Strokes: Freestyle
- Club: CC Aniene
Medal record
Men's swimming
Representing Italy
Event	1st	2nd	3rd
European Championships (LC)	0	1	1
European Junior Championships	3	1	2
Total	3	2	3
European Championships (LC)
Silver medal – second place	2022 Rome	4×200 m freestyle
Bronze medal – third place	2022 Rome	800 m freestyle
European Junior Championships
Gold medal – first place	2022 Otopeni	400 m freestyle
Gold medal – first place	2022 Otopeni	800 m freestyle
Gold medal – first place	2022 Otopeni	4×200 m freestyle
Silver medal – second place	2022 Otopeni	200 m freestyle
Bronze medal – third place	2021 Rome	4×200 m freestyle
Bronze medal – third place	2022 Otopeni	4×100 m freestyle

Lorenzo Galossi (born 25 May 2006) is an Italian competitive swimmer. He is the world junior record in the long course 800-metre freestyle and the European junior record holder in the long course 400-metre freestyle. At the 2022 European Aquatics Championships, he won the bronze medal in the 800-metre freestyle. At the 2022 European Junior Championships, he won medals in three individual events, the gold medal each in the 400-metre freestyle and the 800-metre freestyle and the silver medal in the 200-metre freestyle.

== Background ==
Galossi was born 25 May 2006 in the Mentana area of Rome, Italy and competes for Circolo Canottieri Aniene, CC Aniene, in national and regional competitions. The end of 2022 to beginning of 2023, he transitioned coaching and training methodologies, one change of which included swimming in the evening instead of the early afternoon.

== Career ==
=== 2021–2022 ===
At the 2021 European Junior Swimming Championships, held in Rome in July, Galossi won a bronze medal as part of the 4×200-metre freestyle relay, splitting a 1:50.32 for the first leg of the relay, placed fifth in the 800-metre freestyle, 11th in the 400-metre freestyle, and 12th in the 200-metre freestyle. The following year, as a 15-year-old at the 2022 Italian National Spring Championships in Riccione, he won the silver medal in the 400-metre freestyle with a European junior record time of 3:45.93, qualified for the 2022 World Aquatics Championships in the event, and placed fourth in the 800-metre freestyle with a personal best time of 7:49.76.

==== 2022 World Aquatics Championships ====
For swimming competition at the 2022 World Aquatics Championships, held in June at Danube Arena in Budapest, Hungary, Galossi entered to compete in the 400-metre freestyle. He placed twelfth in the preliminaries of the event, not qualifying for the final with his time of 3:47.19, which was 0.72 seconds behind fellow Italian Marco De Tullio who advanced to the final ranking eighth.

==== 2022 European Junior Championships ====
2022 European Junior Championships
Gold medal – first place	800 m freestyle	7:52.04
Gold medal – first place	4×200 m freestyle	7:17.45
Gold medal – first place	400 m freestyle	3:48.14
Silver medal – second place	200 m freestyle	1:47.71
Bronze medal – third place	4×100 m freestyle	3:19.42

Less than three weeks later, on 5 July, Galossi won a bronze medal in the 4×100-metre freestyle relay on the first day of the 2022 European Junior Swimming Championships, held in Otopeni, Romania, splitting a 50.08 for the lead-off leg of the relay in the final to help achieve a time of 3:19.42. The following day, he won a silver medal in the 200-metre freestyle with a personal best time of 1:47.71 seconds to narrowly finish less than two-tenths of a second ahead of bronze medalist Jacob Whittle of Great Britain. Three days later, he started the finals session winning a gold medal in the 800-metre freestyle with a time of 7:52.04. A little under 30 minutes after this first gold medal of the session, he followed his performance up with a second gold medal, this time helping achieve the first-place finish in the 4×200-metre freestyle relay in a time of 7:17.45 swimming the fourth-leg of the relay. On 10 July, the final day of competition, he won the gold medal in the 400-metre freestyle with a time of 3:48.14, finishing over two seconds ahead of the two swimmers who tied for the silver medal Vlad Stancu of Romania and Krzysztof Chmielewski of Poland.

Ten days later, at the 2022 Italian National Summer Championships in Ostia during the 2022 European heat waves with temperatures around 40 °C (104 °F), Galossi lowered his personal best time in the 800-metre freestyle to a 7:46.28, which marked a drop of over three seconds. On 21 July, as part of the same Championships, he lowered his personal best time in the 200-metre freestyle to a 1:47.42.

==== 2022 European Aquatics Championships ====
2022 European Championships (LC)
Silver medal – second place	4×200 m freestyle	7:06.25
Bronze medal – third place	800 m freestyle	7:43.37 (WJ)

Galossi was the youngest swimmer named to the Italy team roster for the 2022 European Aquatics Championships, held in August in Rome, at 16 years of age. On day one, he swam a 1:47.00 for the anchor leg of the 4×200-metre freestyle relay in the preliminaries, contributing to a time of 7:09.03 and first-rank final qualification. In the final, he split a 1:47.91 for the second leg of the relay to help win the silver medal in a time of 7:06.25. The following day, he ranked fourth in the preliminaries of the 800-metre freestyle with a time of 7:49.08, qualifying for the final less than two-tenths of a second behind third-ranked fellow Italian Gregorio Paltrinieri. He won the bronze medal in the final with a personal best, world junior record, and European junior record time of 7:43.37 at 16 years, 80 days of age. His new world junior record, broke the former mark set by Mack Horton of Australia at 7:45.67 in 2013 by over two full seconds. Day seven of seven, he ranked fifth in the preliminaries of the 400 metre freestyle with a 3:48.15, just 0.17 seconds ahead of fellow Italian Gabriele Detti, who ranked sixth, and as Galossi and Detti were the two fastest Italians they both qualified for the evening final. With a time of 3:46.94 in the final, he placed fifth, finishing 2.41 seconds behind bronze medalist Henning Mühlleitner of Germany.

=== 2023 ===
For the January to April 2023 time frame, Galossi focused on recovery from illness (mononucleosis) and transitioning coaches and training methodologies with uncertainty expressed as to whether he would be well enough to compete at the 2023 Assoluti Championships and 2023 World Aquatics Championships.

== International championships (50 m) ==
Meet	200 freestyle	400 freestyle	800 freestyle	4×100 freestyle relay	4×200 freestyle relay
Junior level
EJC 2021 (age: 15)	12th (1:51.32)	11th (3:55.20)	5th (8:01.94)		(bronze) (split 1:50.32, 1st leg)
EJC 2022 (age: 16)	(silver) (1:47.71)	(gold) (3:48.14)	(gold) (7:52.04)	(bronze) (split 50.08, 1st leg)	(gold) (split 1:48.76, 4th leg)
Senior level
WC 2022 (age: 16)		12th (3:47.19)			
EC 2022 (age: 16)	DNS (NT)	5th (3:46.94)	(bronze) (7:43.37 WJ)		(silver) (split 1:47.91, 2nd leg)

== Personal best times ==
=== Long course metres (50 m pool) ===
Event	Time		Meet	Location	Date	Notes	Ref
100 m freestyle	50.08	r	2022 European Junior Swimming Championships	Otopeni, Romania	5 July 2022		
200 m freestyle	1:47.42		2022 Italian National Summer Championships	Ostia	21 July 2022		
400 m freestyle	3:45.93		2022 Italian National Spring Championships	Riccione	9 April 2022	EJ	
800 m freestyle	7:43.37		2022 European Aquatics Championships	Rome	13 August 2022	WJ, EJ	

Legend: WJ – World junior record; EJ – European junior record; r – relay 1st leg

== Records ==
=== European junior records ===
==== Long course metres (50 m pool) ====
No.	Event	Time	Meet	Location	Date	Age	Notes	Ref
1	400 m freestyle	3:45.93	2022 Italian National Spring Championships	Riccione	9 April 2022	15 years, 319 days		
2	800 m freestyle	7:43.37	2022 European Aquatics Championships	Rome	13 August 2022	16 years, 80 days	WJ	

Legend: WJ – World junior record
