= Zalán Sárkány =

Hungarian swimmer (born 2003)

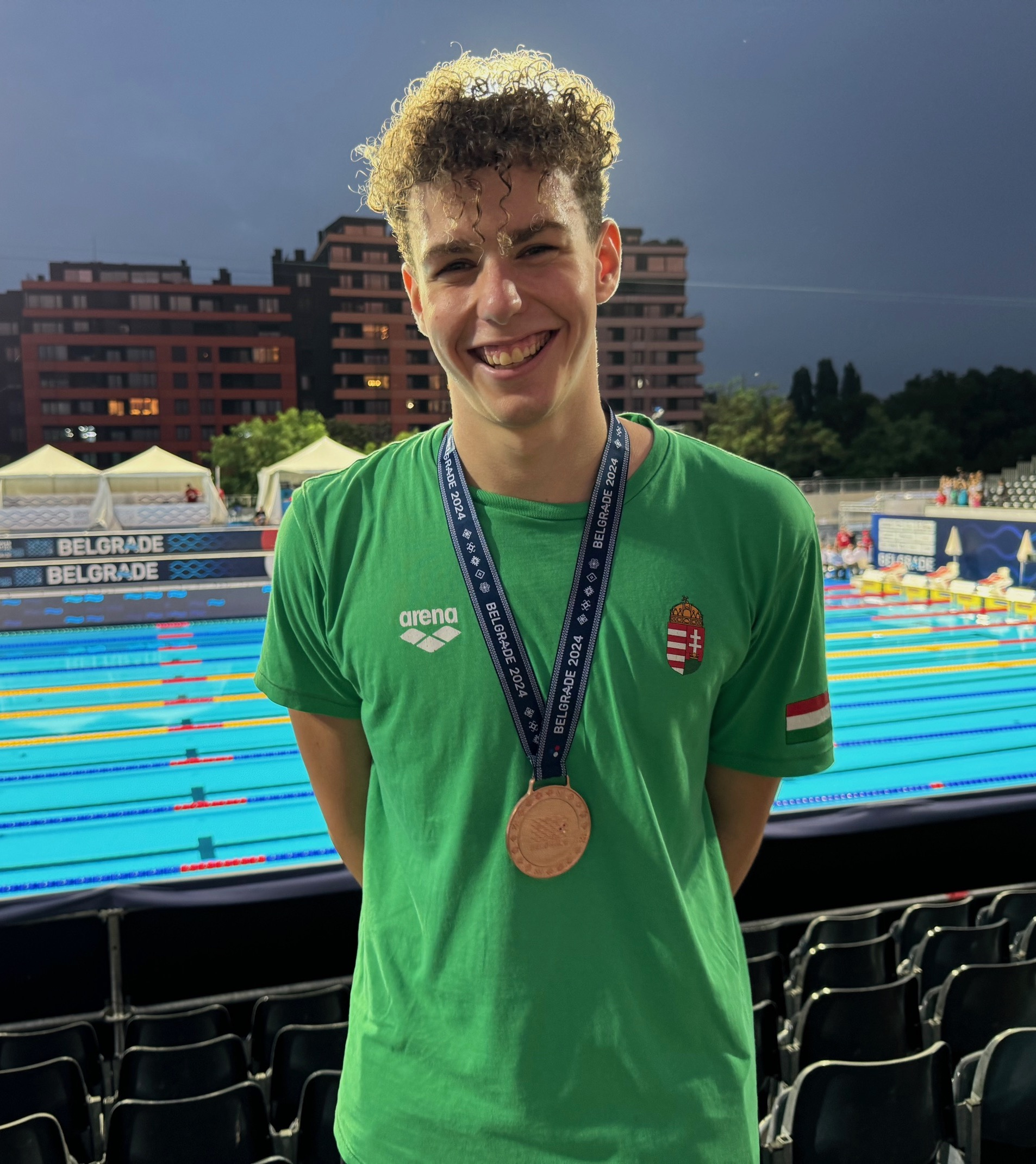
- Sárkány in 2024

Personal information
- Nationality: Hungarian
- Born: 15 October 2003 (age 22)
- Height: 1.91 m (6 ft 3 in)

Sport
- Sport: Swimming
- Strokes: Freestyle
- College team: Indiana University
Medal record
Men's swimming
Representing Hungary
World Championships (SC)
Gold medal – first place	2024 Budapest	800 m freestyle
European Championships (SC)
Gold medal – first place	2025 Lublin	800 m freestyle
Silver medal – second place	2025 Lublin	1500 m freestyle
European Championships (LC)
Silver medal – second place	2026 Paris	1500 m freestyle
Bronze medal – third place	2024 Belgrade	800 m freestyle
Bronze medal – third place	2024 Belgrade	1500 m freestyle
Bronze medal – third place	2026 Paris	800 m freestyle

Zalán Sárkány (born 15 October 2003) is a Hungarian swimmer. He represented Hungary at the 2024 Summer Olympics.

== Early life and education ==
Sárkány began his collegiate swimming career at Arizona State University. During the 2024 NCAA Division I Men's Swimming and Diving Championships he won NCAA championship in the 1,650-yard freestyle and helped Arizona State win the program's first team NCAA championship. In June 2024, he transferred to Indiana University. He repeated as NCAA Champion in the 1,650-yard freestyle at the 2025 NCAA Division I Men's Swimming and Diving Championships, setting a Big Ten Conference and program record with a time of 14:21.29. This was the second-fastest time in NCAA history, trailing Bobby Finke's all-time record. He became the first national champion in the event for Indiana since John Kinsella in 1973.

== Career ==
In June 2024, Sárkány competed at the 2024 European Aquatics Championships and won bronze medals in the 800 metre freestyle and 1500 metre freestyle events. He was then selected to represent Hungary at the 2024 Summer Olympics. His best finish was eleventh place in the 1500 metre freestyle with a personal best time of 14:52.42. In December 2024, he competed at the 2024 World Aquatics Swimming Championships and won a gold medal in the 800 metre freestyle with a national record time of 7:30.56.

In December 2025, he competed at the 2025 European Short Course Swimming Championships and won a gold medal in the 800 metre freestyle with a national record time of 7:26.84. He also won a silver medal in the 1500 metre freestyle with a national record time of 14:15.51.

In August 2026, he competed at the 2026 European Aquatics Championships and won a silver medal in the 1500 metre freestyle with a national record time of 14:39.45. He also won a bronze medal in the 800 metre freestyle with a national record time of 7:41.75.
