= Sven Schwarz (swimmer) =

German swimmer

Personal information
- National team: Germany
- Born: 31 January 2002 (age 24) Germany
- Height: 1.93 m (6 ft 4 in)

Sport
- Sport: Swimming
- Strokes: Freestyle
- Club: W98 Hannover
Medal record
Men's swimming
Representing Germany
Event	1st	2nd	3rd
World Championships (LC)	0	2	0
European Championships (LC)	0	1	0
European Championships (SC)	0	0	2
Swimming World Cup	0	0	2
European U-23 Championships	1	1	0
European Junior Championships	0	1	2
Total	1	5	6
World Championships (LC)
Silver medal – second place	2025 Singapore	800 m freestyle
Silver medal – second place	2025 Singapore	1500 m freestyle
European Championships (LC)
Silver medal – second place	2026 Paris	800 m freestyle
European Championships (SC)
Bronze medal – third place	2021 Kazan	800 m freestyle
Bronze medal – third place	2021 Kazan	1500 m freestyle
Swimming World Cup
Bronze medal – third place	2021 Berlin	1500 m freestyle
Bronze medal – third place	2022 Berlin	1500 m freestyle
European Youth Olympic Festival
Silver medal – second place	2017 Győr	1500 m freestyle
European U-23 Championships
Gold medal – first place	2023 Dublin	800 m freestyle
Gold medal – first place	2025 Samorin	800 m freestyle
Gold medal – first place	2025 Samorin	1500 m freestyle
Silver medal – second place	2023 Dublin	1500 m freestyle
European Junior Championships
Silver medal – second place	2019 Kazan	4×200 m freestyle
Bronze medal – third place	2019 Kazan	800 m freestyle
Bronze medal – third place	2019 Kazan	1500 m freestyle

Sven Schwarz (born 31 January 2002) is a German competitive swimmer. He is the world junior record holder in the short course 800 metre freestyle, and the 2023 European under-23 champion over 800 metres (long course). He won a silver medal in the 4×200 metre freestyle relay and bronze medals in the 800 metre and 1500 metre freestyle at the 2019 European Junior Championships. In 2021, he won one bronze medal each in the 800 metre freestyle and 1500 metre freestyle at the 2021 European Short Course Championships. At the 2022 European Aquatics Championships (long course), he placed fifth in the final of the 800 metre freestyle.

== Background ==
Schwarz was born 31 January 2002 in Germany. He competes for swim club W98 Hannover.

== Career ==
=== 2019 ===
==== 2019 European Junior Championships ====
2019 European Junior Championships
Silver medal – second place	4×200 m freestyle	7:18.31
Bronze medal – third place	1500 m freestyle	15:09.41
Bronze medal – third place	800 m freestyle	7:53.74

For his first medal of the 2019 European Junior Swimming Championships, held at the Palace of Water Sports in Kazan, Russia in early July, Schwarz won the bronze medal in the 1500 metre freestyle with a time of 15:09.41, finishing behind a gold-silver medal finish by two Russian swimmers. Schwarz won his second medal on 5 July, splitting a 1:49.04 for the second leg of the Germany 4×200 metre freestyle relay and helping the relay achieve a silver medal-winning time of 7:18.31, which was less than two seconds slower than the gold medal-winning time of 7:16.49 swum by the Russian relay team. On Saturday 6 July, Schwarz posted a personal best time of 7:53.74 in the 800 metre freestyle, earning the bronze medal in the event behind two Russians, making the only swimmers Schwarz finished behind in all three events he medaled in Russian.

==== 2019 German Championships ====
At the 2019 German Short Course Championships in Berlin in November, Schwarz swam a personal best time in the short course 800 metre freestyle of 7:36.00, which earned him the silver medal in the event behind Florian Wellbrock and set a new world junior record in the event, breaking the mark of 7:41.51 established by FINA for the event in 2014.

=== 2021 ===
==== 2021 Swimming World Cup: Berlin ====
2021 World Cup – Berlin
Bronze medal – third place	1500 m freestyle	14:45.83

On day one of competition at the 2021 FINA Swimming World Cup stop in Berlin, 1 October, Schwarz swam a 3:45.86 in the prelims heats of the 400 metre freestyle and qualified for the final ranked seventh overall. In the final of the event later the same day, Schwarz finished sixth with a time of 3:44.90. The second day, Schwarz won the bronze medal in the 1500 metre freestyle timed final in 14:45.83. On the third and final day of competition, Schwarz ranked 27th overall in the prelims heats of the 200 metre freestyle with his time of 1:49.65 and did not advance to the final.

==== 2021 European Short Course Championships ====
2021 European Championships
Bronze medal – third place	1500 m freestyle	14:26.24
Bronze medal – third place	800 m freestyle	7:33.85

At the 2021 European Short Course Swimming Championships in Kazan, Russia in November, Schwarz ranked sixth in the prelims heats of the 1500 meter freestyle on 3 November with a time of 14:41.74 and qualified for the final the following day. In the final, he swam a 14:26.24 and earned the bronze medal in the event, finishing behind gold medalist Florian Wellbrock, also of Germany, and silver medalist Gregorio Paltrinieri of Italy. On 6 November, in the prelims heats of the 800 meter freestyle, Schwarz qualified for the final of the event ranked seventh overall with his time of 7:39.07. The final day of competition, 7 November, he won the bronze medal in the event, finishing after gold medalist Gregorio Paltrinieri and silver medalist Florian Wellbrock with a time of 7:33.85.

=== 2022 ===
Through 30 March for the 2022 year, Schwarz ranked in the global top five for the long course 800 metre freestyle, second, and long course 400 metre freestyle, fourth. In April, at the 2022 Berlin Swim Open, he lowered his best time in the 800 metre freestyle to a 7:46.64.

==== 2022 European Aquatics Championships ====
Schwarz was named to the Germany roster for the 2022 European Aquatics Championships, held in August in Rome, Italy, in the 400 metre freestyle and 800 metre freestyle. In the preliminaries of the 800 metre freestyle on day two, he ranked sixth overall with a time of 7:49.30 and qualified for the final. He placed fifth in the final with a time of 7:47.36, finishing less than four seconds behind bronze medalist Lorenzo Galossi of Italy. In the preliminaries of the 400 metre freestyle on day seven, he placed tenth with a time of 3:49.58 and did not qualify for the evening final.

==== 2022 Swimming World Cup: Berlin ====
2022 World Cup – Berlin
Bronze medal – third place	1500 m freestyle	14:34.87

For his first of two individual events at the 2022 FINA Swimming World Cup held in Berlin and conducted in short course metres, Schwarz placed fifteenth in the 400 metre freestyle preliminary heats with a time of 3:46.02, which was 4.51 seconds slower than first-ranked Danas Rapšys of Lithuania. In his second event, the 1500 metre freestyle, he finished in a time of 14:34.87, which was 10.96 seconds faster than his time at the Swimming World Cup stop in Berlin one year prior, and won the bronze medal.

=== 2023 ===
On 21 April 2023, at the Berlin Swim Open, Schwarz placed fifth in the 1500 metre freestyle with a personal best time of 14:49.22. The following two days, he won bronze medals in the 800 metre freestyle, with a personal best time of 7:43.43 on 22 April, and the 400 metre freestyle, with a personal best time of 3:46.56 on 23 April.

== International championships (50 m) ==
Meet	400 freestyle	800 freestyle	1500 freestyle	4×200 freestyle relay
Junior level
EYOF 2017	7th	—N/a	2nd place, silver medalist(s)	—N/a
EJC 2019		3rd place, bronze medalist(s)	3rd place, bronze medalist(s)	2nd place, silver medalist(s)
Senior level
EC 2022	10th	5th		

== International championships (25 m) ==
Meet	800 freestyle	1500 freestyle
EC 2021	3rd place, bronze medalist(s)	3rd place, bronze medalist(s)

== Personal best times ==
=== Long course metres (50 m pool) ===
Event	Time	Meet	Location	Date	Ref
400 m freestyle	3:45.92	2023 German Championships		9 July 2023	
800 m freestyle	7:38.12 Former ER	2025 German Championships	Berlin	2 May 2025	
1500 m freestyle	14:36.82	2025 German Championships	Berlin	4 May 2025	

=== Short course metres (25 m pool) ===
Event	Time	Meet	Location	Date	Ref
400 m freestyle	3:43.17	2019 Germany International Meet	Berlin	17 November 2019	
800 m freestyle	7:33.85	2021 European Short Course Championships	Kazan, Russia	4 November 2021	
1500 m freestyle	14:26.24	2021 European Short Course Championships	Kazan, Russia	7 November 2021	

== Swimming World Cup circuits ==
The following medals Schwarz has won at Swimming World Cup circuits.

Edition	Gold medals	Silver medals	Bronze medals	Total
2021	0	0	1	1
2022	0	0	1	1
Total	0	0	2	2

== World records ==
=== World junior records ===
==== Short course metres (25 m pool) ====
No.	Event	Time	Meet	Location	Date	Age	Status	Ref
1	800 m freestyle	7:36.00	2019 German Short Course Championships	Berlin	16 November 2019	17	Current	

== See also ==
- List of junior world records in swimming
- List of European Short Course Swimming Championships medalists (men)
