= Oliver Klemet =

German swimmer (born 2002)

Personal information
- Nationality: German
- Born: 18 March 2002 (age 24) Wehrheim, Germany
- Height: 1.87 m (6 ft 2 in)

Sport
- Sport: Swimming
- Strokes: Freestyle
- Club: SG Frankfurt
Medal record
Men's swimming
Representing Germany
Olympic Games
Silver medal – second place	2024 Paris	10 km open water
World Championships (open water)
Gold medal – first place	2022 Budapest	Team open water
Gold medal – first place	2025 Singapore	Team open water
Bronze medal – third place	2023 Fukuoka	10 km open water
European Championships (open water)
Gold medal – first place	2026 Paris	Team open water
Bronze medal – third place	2026 Paris	10 km open water
European Championships (LC)
Bronze medal – third place	2026 Paris	1500 m freestyle

Oliver Klemet (born March 18, 2002) is a German open water swimmer. He won gold medal in the 4 x 1.5 km relay with Boy, Beck and Wellbrock at the 2022 World Swimming Championships in Budapest, Hungary. In July 2023, Klemet won the bronze medal in the ten-kilometer open water event at the World Aquatics Championships in Fukuoka. At the 2024 Summer Olympics in Paris, France, Klemet won the silver medal in the 10 km Open Water event.

== See also ==
- List of World Aquatics Championships medalists in open water swimming
