= Bahrain at the 2025 World Aquatics Championships =

- Flag of Bahrain
- World Aquatics code: BHR
- National federation: Bahrain Swimming Association

in Singapore
- Competitors: 4 in 1 sport
- Medals: Gold 0 Silver 0 Bronze 0 Total 0

World Aquatics Championships appearances
- 1973; 1975; 1978; 1982; 1986; 1991; 1994; 1998; 2001; 2003; 2005; 2007; 2009; 2011; 2013; 2015; 2017; 2019; 2022; 2023; 2024; 2025

Bahrain is competing at the 2025 World Aquatics Championships in Singapore from 11 July to 3 August 2025.

== Competitors ==
The following is the list of competitors in the Championships.

| Sport | Men | Women | Total |
|---|---|---|---|
| Swimming | 2 | 2 | 4 |
| Total | 2 | 2 | 4 |

== Swimming ==
Men

| Athlete | Event | Heat | | Semifinal | | Final | |
| Athlete | Event | Time | Rank | Time | Rank | Time | Rank |
|---|---|---|---|---|---|---|---|
| Saud Ghali | 100 m breaststroke | 1:06.50 | 63 | Did not advance | | | |
| Saud Ghali | 200 m breaststroke | 2:24.00 | 35 | Did not advance | | | |
| Ahmed Theibich | 1500 m freestyle | 17:21.71 | 21 | — | | Did not advance | |
| Ahmed Theibich | 400 m medley | 4:56.83 | 31 | — | | Did not advance | |

Women

| Athlete | Event | Heat | | Semifinal | | Final | |
| Athlete | Event | Time | Rank | Time | Rank | Time | Rank |
|---|---|---|---|---|---|---|---|
| Amani Al-Obaidli | 50 m backstroke | 30.67 | 44 | Did not advance | | | |
| Amani Al-Obaidli | 100 m backstroke | 1:06.57 | 46 | Did not advance | | | |
| Asma Lefalher | 100 m freestyle | 1:00.53 | 56 | Did not advance | | | |
| Asma Lefalher | 100 m butterfly | 1:05.53 NR | 51 | Did not advance | | | |
