= Swimming at the 2024 Summer Olympics – Qualification =

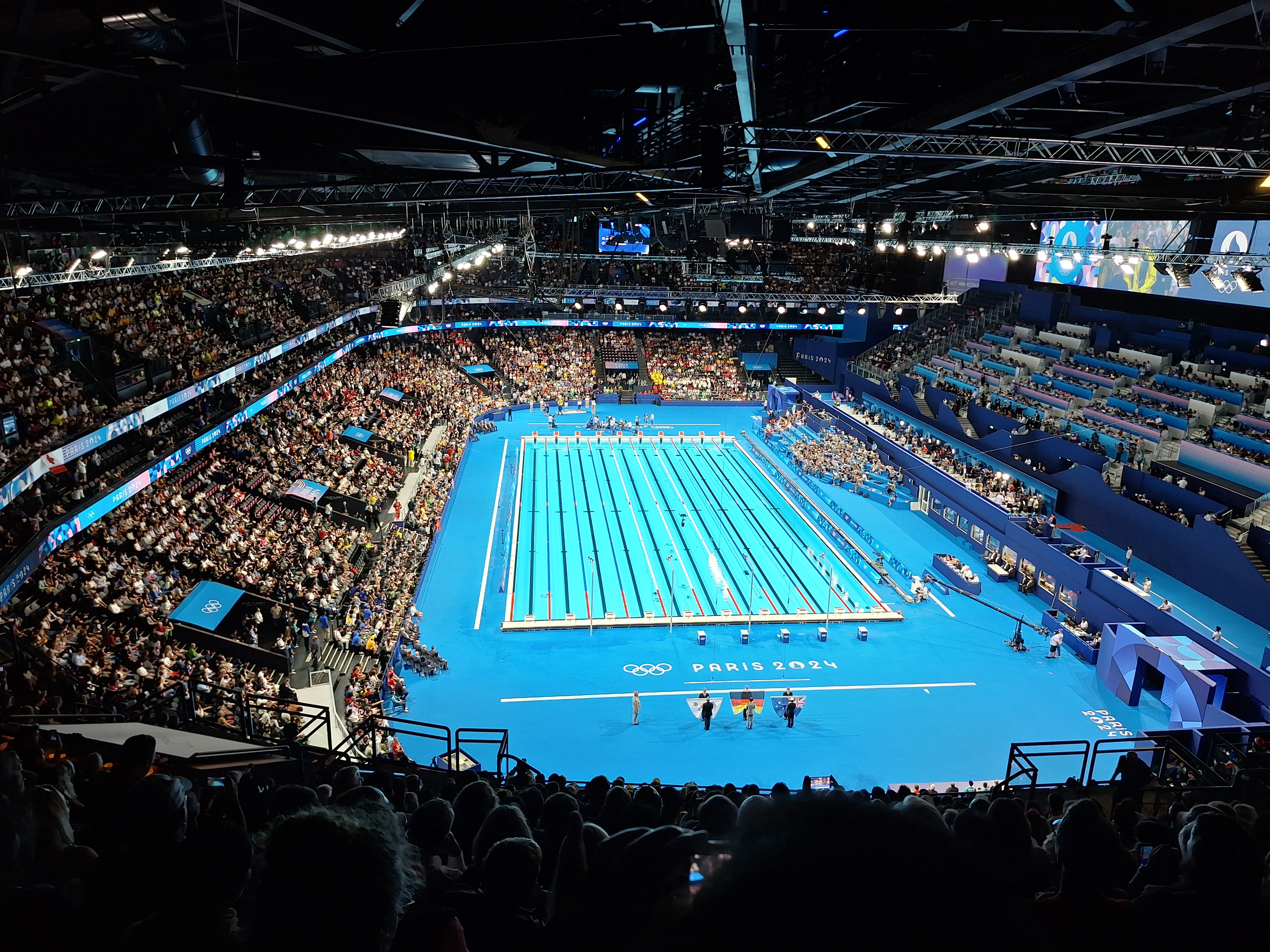
Paris La Défense Arena after it was converted to a swimming pool for the swimming events

The qualifying phase for swimming at the 2024 Summer Olympics occurred between 1 March 2023 and 23 June 2024. 852 athletes qualified for 35 swimming pool events at the Games.

Athletes qualified for the individual swimming pool events through achieving World Aquatics' specified time standards. They could also qualify through universality places, which allowed each National Olympic Committee to enter some athletes regardless of their qualification time, to ensure a wide range of nations were included. National teams qualified for the relay events through their performances at the 2023 or 2024 World Championships.

== Qualification processes ==
=== Individual events ===
Each National Olympic Committee (NOC) was permitted to enter a maximum of two qualified athletes in each individual event, but only if both of them had attained the Olympic Qualifying Time (OQT). After accepting the two athletes from each NOC who achieved the OQT, World Aquatics considered athletes who had only qualified in a relay event, and then athletes qualifying through universality: NOCs were given one event entry for each gender, which could be used by any athlete regardless of qualification time, as long as no swimmer from that nation had already taken a spot by achieving the OQT. (Note: NOCs were subject to some other restrictions on who they could pick to fill their universality places.) Finally, the rest of the spaces were filled by athletes who had met the Olympic Consideration Time (OCT).

The event OQTs corresponded to the time achieved by the fourteenth-place swimmer in their preliminary heat at the previous Games, while the OCTs were derived by adding 0.5% onto the OQT.

The qualifying time standards had to have been achieved at one of the international meets approved by World Aquatics between 1 March 2023, and 23 June 2024. These included the 2023 and 2024 World Championships, continental meets, national championships and selection trials, and some other competitions approved by World Aquatics.

Qualifying standards for the men's events
Event	OQT	OCT
50 m freestyle	21.96	22.07
100 m freestyle	48.34	48.58
200 m freestyle	1:46.26	1:46.79
400 m freestyle	3:46.78 (Note: Because the fourteenth-place swimmer achieved a standard slower than the OQT in Tokyo 2020, Tokyo's OQT was used instead.)	3:47.91
800 m freestyle	7:51.65	7:54.01
1500 m freestyle	15:00.99	15:05.49
100 m backstroke	53.74	54.01
200 m backstroke	1:57.50	1:58.09
100 m breaststroke	59.49	59.79
200 m breaststroke	2:09.68	2:10.33
100 m butterfly	51.67	51.93
200 m butterfly	1:55.78	1:56.36
200 m individual medley	1:57.94	1:58.53
400 m individual medley	4:12.50	4:13.76

Qualifying standards for the women's events
Event	OQT	OCT
50 m freestyle	24.70	24.82
100 m freestyle	53.61	53.88
200 m freestyle	1:57.26	1:57.85
400 m freestyle	4:07.90	4:09.14
800 m freestyle	8:26.71	8:29.24
1500 m freestyle	16:09.09	16:13.94
100 m backstroke	59.99	1:00.29
200 m backstroke	2:10.39	2:11.04
100 m breaststroke	1:06.79	1:07.12
200 m breaststroke	2:23.91	2:24.63
100 m butterfly	57.92	58.21
200 m butterfly	2:08.43	2:09.07
200 m individual medley	2:11.47	2:12.13
400 m individual medley	4:38.53	4:39.92

=== Relay events ===
Each NOC could enter one team per event and there were a total of sixteen qualification places available in each event. The first three qualifying places were given to the podium finishers at the 2023 World Championships, and the final thirteen qualifying places were allocated to the fastest performances at the 2023 and 2024 World Championships.

All athletes who qualified for individual events were allowed to be used by the relay teams in any event, regardless of what individual event they qualified for.

== Qualified athletes ==
=== Individual events ===
In total, 852 athletes qualified for the individual events. They are listed below.

==== Men's 50 m freestyle ====
Qualifiers for the men's 50 m freestyle
Qualification standard	No. of athletes	NOC	Qualified swimmers
Olympic Qualifying Time – 21.96	2	Australia	Ben Armbruster; Cameron McEvoy
Olympic Qualifying Time – 21.96	2	France	Maxime Grousset; Florent Manaudou
Olympic Qualifying Time – 21.96	2	Great Britain	Alexander Cohoon; Ben Proud
Olympic Qualifying Time – 21.96	2	Greece	Stergios Bilas; Kristian Gkolomeev
Olympic Qualifying Time – 21.96	2	Ireland	Tom Fannon; Shane Ryan
Olympic Qualifying Time – 21.96	2	Israel	Meiron Cheruti; Martin Kartavi
Olympic Qualifying Time – 21.96	2	Italy	Leonardo Deplano; Lorenzo Zazzeri
Olympic Qualifying Time – 21.96	2	Netherlands	Kenzo Simons; Renzo Tjon-A-Joe
Olympic Qualifying Time – 21.96	2	Portugal	Miguel Nascimento; Diogo Ribeiro
Olympic Qualifying Time – 21.96	2	United States	Caeleb Dressel; Chris Guiliano
Olympic Qualifying Time – 21.96	1	Aruba	Mikel Schreuders
Olympic Qualifying Time – 21.96	1	Brazil	Guilherme Caribé
Olympic Qualifying Time – 21.96	1	Canada	Josh Liendo
Olympic Qualifying Time – 21.96	1	Cayman Islands	Jordan Crooks
Olympic Qualifying Time – 21.96	1	China	Pan Zhanle
Olympic Qualifying Time – 21.96	1	Croatia	Jere Hribar
Olympic Qualifying Time – 21.96	1	Germany	Artem Selin
Olympic Qualifying Time – 21.96	1	Hong Kong	Ian Ho
Olympic Qualifying Time – 21.96	1	Hungary	Szebasztián Szabó
Olympic Qualifying Time – 21.96	1	Mexico	Gabriel Castaño
Olympic Qualifying Time – 21.96	1	New Zealand	Taiko Torepe-Ormsby
Olympic Qualifying Time – 21.96	1	Norway	Nicholas Lia
Olympic Qualifying Time – 21.96	1	Poland	Piotr Ludwiczak
Olympic Qualifying Time – 21.96	1	Serbia	Andrej Barna
Olympic Qualifying Time – 21.96	1	Singapore	Jonathan Tan
Olympic Qualifying Time – 21.96	1	South Korea	Ji Yu-chan
Olympic Qualifying Time – 21.96	1	Sweden	Björn Seeliger
Olympic Qualifying Time – 21.96	1	Trinidad and Tobago	Dylan Carter
Olympic Qualifying Time – 21.96	1	Ukraine	Vladyslav Bukhov
Olympic Qualifying Time – 21.96	1	Venezuela	Alberto Mestre
Olympic Consideration Time – 22.07	0	—N/a	
Universality place	1	Afghanistan	Fahim Anwari
Universality place	1	Burundi	Belly-Cresus Ganira
Universality place	1	Burkina Faso	Souleymane Napare
Universality place	1	Cape Verde	José Tati
Universality place	1	Central African Republic	Terence Tengue
Universality place	1	Democratic Republic of the Congo	Aristote Ndombe Impelenga
Universality place	1	Djibouti	Houmed Houssein Barkat
Universality place	1	Dominica	Warren Lawrence
Universality place	1	Timor-Leste	Jolanio Guterres
Universality place	1	Equatorial Guinea	Higinio Ndong Obama
Universality place	1	Eritrea	Aaron Owusu
Universality place	1	Fiji	David Young
Universality place	1	Gabon	Adam Girard de Langlade Mpali
Universality place	1	The Gambia	Ousman Jobe
Universality place	1	Guinea	Elhadj Diallo
Universality place	1	Guinea-Bissau	Pedro Rogery
Universality place	1	Individual Neutral Athletes (Note: In response to the Russian invasion of Ukraine, Russian and Belarusian athletes were banned from representing their country at the Games. Athletes from these countries were allowed to compete as Individual Neutral Athletes if the met the eligibility criteria, which included that they had not shown any support for the war.)	Evgenii Somov
Universality place	1	Malawi	Filipe Gomes
Universality place	1	Maldives	Mohamed Aan Hussain
Universality place	1	Malta	Kyle Micallef
Universality place	1	Marshall Islands	Phillip Kinono
Universality place	1	Mauritania	Camil Doua
Universality place	1	Niger	Marouane Mamane
Universality place	1	Nigeria	Tobi Sijuade
Universality place	1	Palau	Jion Hosei
Universality place	1	Republic of the Congo	Freddy Mayala
Universality place	1	Saint Kitts and Nevis	Troy Nisbett
Universality place	1	Saint Vincent and the Grenadines	Alex Joachim
Universality place	1	Sierra Leone	Joshua Wyse
Universality place	1	Slovakia	Matej Duša
Universality place	1	Switzerland	Thierry Bollin
Universality place	1	Tajikistan	Fakhriddin Madkamov
Universality place	1	Togo	Jordano Daou
Universality place	1	Zambia	Damien Shamambo
Invitational place	1	Refugee Olympic Team	Alaa Maso
Total	75		

==== Men's 100 m freestyle ====
Qualifiers for the men's 100 m freestyle
Qualification standard	No. of athletes	NOC	Qualified swimmers
Olympic Qualifying Time – 48.34	2	Australia	Kyle Chalmers; William Yang
Olympic Qualifying Time – 48.34	2	Brazil	Guilherme Caribé; Marcelo Chierighini
Olympic Qualifying Time – 48.34	2	Canada	Yuri Kisil; Josh Liendo
Olympic Qualifying Time – 48.34	2	China	Pan Zhanle; Wang Haoyu
Olympic Qualifying Time – 48.34	2	France	Rafael Fente-Damers; Maxime Grousset
Olympic Qualifying Time – 48.34	2	Great Britain	Matt Richards; Duncan Scott
Olympic Qualifying Time – 48.34	2	Serbia	Andrej Barna; Velimir Stjepanović
Olympic Qualifying Time – 48.34	2	United States	Jack Alexy; Chris Guiliano
Olympic Qualifying Time – 48.34	1	Cayman Islands	Jordan Crooks
Olympic Qualifying Time – 48.34	1	Croatia	Nikola Miljenić
Olympic Qualifying Time – 48.34	1	Germany	Josha Salchow
Olympic Qualifying Time – 48.34	1	Hungary	Nándor Németh
Olympic Qualifying Time – 48.34	1	Israel	Tomer Frankel
Olympic Qualifying Time – 48.34	1	Italy	Alessandro Miressi
Olympic Qualifying Time – 48.34	1	Japan	Katsuhiro Matsumoto
Olympic Qualifying Time – 48.34	1	Lithuania	Danas Rapšys
Olympic Qualifying Time – 48.34	1	Mexico	Jorge Iga
Olympic Qualifying Time – 48.34	1	Netherlands	Sean Niewold
Olympic Qualifying Time – 48.34	1	New Zealand	Cameron Gray
Olympic Qualifying Time – 48.34	1	Portugal	Diogo Ribeiro
Olympic Qualifying Time – 48.34	1	Romania	David Popovici
Olympic Qualifying Time – 48.34	1	South Korea	Hwang Sun-woo
Olympic Qualifying Time – 48.34	1	Spain	Sergio de Celis
Olympic Qualifying Time – 48.34	1	Trinidad and Tobago	Dylan Carter
Olympic Consideration Time – 48.58	1	Aruba	Mikel Schreuders
Universality place	1	Albania	Grisi Koxhaku
Universality place	1	Angola	Henrique Mascarenhas
Universality place	1	Armenia	Artur Barseghyan
Universality place	1	Bahamas	Lamar Taylor
Universality place	1	Bangladesh	Samiul Islam Rafi
Universality place	1	Barbados	Jack Kirby
Universality place	1	Bhutan	Sangay Tenzin
Universality place	1	Cambodia	Antoine De Lapparent
Universality place	1	Cameroon	Giorgio Armani Nguichie Kamseu Kamogne
Universality place	1	Comoros	Hassane Hadji
Universality place	1	Cyprus	Nikolas Antoniou
Universality place	1	Czech Republic	Daniel Gracik
Universality place	1	Dominican Republic	Javier Núñez
Universality place	1	El Salvador	Nixon Hernández
Universality place	1	Ghana	Harry Stacey
Universality place	1	Hong Kong	Ian Ho
Universality place	1	Iran	Samyar Abdoli
Universality place	1	Kazakhstan	Adilbek Mussin
Universality place	1	Kosovo	Adell Saboviq
Universality place	1	Kuwait	Mohamad Zubaid
Universality place	1	Lebanon	Simon Doueihy
Universality place	1	Libya	Yousef Abubaker
Universality place	1	Luxembourg	Ralph Daleiden
Universality place	1	Mali	Alexien Kouma
Universality place	1	Mauritius	Ovesh Purahoo
Universality place	1	Mongolia	Batbayar Enkhtamir
Universality place	1	Myanmar	Phone Pyae Han
Universality place	1	Nepal	Alexander Shah
Universality place	1	Oman	Issa Al-Adawi
Universality place	1	Papua New Guinea	Josh Tarere
Universality place	1	Poland	Jakub Majerski
Universality place	1	Saint Lucia	Jayhan Odlum-Smith
Universality place	1	Samoa	Johann Stickland
Universality place	1	Saudi Arabia	Zaid Al-Sarraj
Universality place	1	Senegal	Matthieu Seye
Universality place	1	Singapore	Jonathan Tan
Universality place	1	Sri Lanka	Kyle Abeysinghe
Universality place	1	Suriname	Irvin Hoost
Universality place	1	Sweden	Björn Seeliger
Universality place	1	Tanzania	Collins Saliboko
Universality place	1	Thailand	Dulyawat Kaewsriyong
Universality place	1	Turkmenistan	Musa Zhalayev
Universality place	1	United Arab Emirates	Yousuf Al-Matrooshi
Universality place	1	Uruguay	Leo Nolles
Universality place	1	Vanuatu	Johnathan Silas
Universality place	1	Venezuela	Alberto Mestre
Total	79		

==== Men's 200 m freestyle ====
Qualifiers for the men's 200 m freestyle
Qualification standard	No. of athletes	NOC	Qualified swimmers
Olympic Qualifying Time – 1:46.26	2	Australia	Maximillian Giuliani; Thomas Neill
Olympic Qualifying Time – 1:46.26	2	China	Ji Xinjie; Pan Zhanle
Olympic Qualifying Time – 1:46.26	2	Germany	Lukas Märtens; Rafael Miroslaw
Olympic Qualifying Time – 1:46.26	2	Great Britain	Matt Richards; Duncan Scott
Olympic Qualifying Time – 1:46.26	2	Japan	Hidenari Mano; Katsuhiro Matsumoto
Olympic Qualifying Time – 1:46.26	2	South Korea	Hwang Sun-woo; Lee Ho-joon
Olympic Qualifying Time – 1:46.26	2	United States	Chris Guiliano; Luke Hobson
Olympic Qualifying Time – 1:46.26	1	Austria	Felix Auböck
Olympic Qualifying Time – 1:46.26	1	Brazil	Guilherme Costa
Olympic Qualifying Time – 1:46.26	1	Hungary	Nándor Németh
Olympic Qualifying Time – 1:46.26	1	Israel	Denis Loktev
Olympic Qualifying Time – 1:46.26	1	Italy	Alessandro Ragaini
Olympic Qualifying Time – 1:46.26	1	Lithuania	Danas Rapšys
Olympic Qualifying Time – 1:46.26	1	Romania	David Popovici
Olympic Consideration Time – 1:46.79	1	Belgium	Lucas Henveaux
Olympic Consideration Time – 1:46.79	1	Mexico	Jorge Iga
Olympic Consideration Time – 1:46.79	1	Switzerland	Antonio Djakovic
Universality place	1	Pakistan	Muhammad Ahmed Durrani
Universality place	1	Serbia	Velimir Stjepanović
Universality place	1	Slovenia	Sašo Boškan
Universality place	1	Syria	Omar Abbas
Total	28		

==== Men's 400 m freestyle ====
Qualifiers for the men's 400 m freestyle
Qualification standard	No. of athletes	NOC	Qualified swimmers
Olympic Qualifying Time – 3:46.78	2	Australia	Samuel Short; Elijah Winnington
Olympic Qualifying Time – 3:46.78	2	Brazil	Guilherme Costa; Eduardo Moraes
Olympic Qualifying Time – 3:46.78	2	China	Fei Liwei; Zhang Zhanshuo
Olympic Qualifying Time – 3:46.78	2	Germany	Oliver Klemet; Lukas Märtens
Olympic Qualifying Time – 3:46.78	2	United States	Aaron Shackell; Kieran Smith
Olympic Qualifying Time – 3:46.78	1	Austria	Felix Auböck
Olympic Qualifying Time – 3:46.78	1	Belgium	Lucas Henveaux
Olympic Qualifying Time – 3:46.78	1	Bulgaria	Petar Mitsin
Olympic Qualifying Time – 3:46.78	1	France	David Aubry
Olympic Qualifying Time – 3:46.78	1	Great Britain	Kieran Bird
Olympic Qualifying Time – 3:46.78	1	Ireland	Daniel Wiffen
Olympic Qualifying Time – 3:46.78	1	Lithuania	Danas Rapšys
Olympic Qualifying Time – 3:46.78	1	South Korea	Kim Woo-min
Olympic Qualifying Time – 3:46.78	1	Sweden	Victor Johansson
Olympic Qualifying Time – 3:46.78	1	Switzerland	Antonio Djakovic
Olympic Qualifying Time – 3:46.78	1	Tunisia	Ahmed Jaouadi
Olympic Qualifying Time – 3:46.78	1	Ukraine	Mykhailo Romanchuk
Olympic Qualifying Time – 3:46.78	1	Venezuela	Alfonso Mestre
Olympic Consideration Time – 3:47.91	1	Hungary	Zalán Sárkány
Universality place	1	Bosnia and Herzegovina	Jovan Lekić
Universality place	1	Chile	Eduardo Cisternas
Universality place	1	Costa Rica	Alberto Vega
Universality place	1	Estonia	Kregor Zirk
Universality place	1	Guyana	Raekwon Noel
Universality place	1	Kenya	Ridhwan Abubakar
Universality place	1	Malaysia	Khiew Hoe Yean
Universality place	1	Moldova	Pavel Alovațki
Universality place	1	Morocco	Ilias El Fallaki
Universality place	1	North Macedonia	Nikola Ǵuretanoviḱ
Universality place	1	Peru	Joaquín Vargas
Universality place	1	San Marino	Loris Bianchi
Universality place	1	Uzbekistan	Ilia Sibirtsev
Total	37		

==== Men's 800 m freestyle ====
Qualifiers for the men's 800 m freestyle
Qualification standard	No. of athletes	NOC	Qualified swimmers
Olympic Qualifying Time – 7:51.65	2	Australia	Samuel Short; Elijah Winnington
Olympic Qualifying Time – 7:51.65	2	China	Fei Liwei; Zhang Zhanshuo
Olympic Qualifying Time – 7:51.65	2	France	David Aubry; Pacome Bricout
Olympic Qualifying Time – 7:51.65	2	Germany	Oliver Klemet; Sven Schwarz
Olympic Qualifying Time – 7:51.65	2	Italy	Luca de Tullio; Gregorio Paltrinieri
Olympic Qualifying Time – 7:51.65	2	Norway	Henrik Christiansen; Jon Jøntvedt
Olympic Qualifying Time – 7:51.65	2	United States	Bobby Finke; Luke Whitlock
Olympic Qualifying Time – 7:51.65	1	Austria	Felix Auböck
Olympic Qualifying Time – 7:51.65	1	Brazil	Guilherme Costa
Olympic Qualifying Time – 7:51.65	1	Egypt	Marwan Elkamash
Olympic Qualifying Time – 7:51.65	1	Greece	Dimitrios Markos
Olympic Qualifying Time – 7:51.65	1	Hungary	Zalán Sárkány
Olympic Qualifying Time – 7:51.65	1	Ireland	Daniel Wiffen
Olympic Qualifying Time – 7:51.65	1	Poland	Krzysztof Chmielewski
Olympic Qualifying Time – 7:51.65	1	Romania	Vlad Stancu
Olympic Qualifying Time – 7:51.65	1	South Korea	Kim Woo-min
Olympic Qualifying Time – 7:51.65	1	Spain	Carlos Garach
Olympic Qualifying Time – 7:51.65	1	Sweden	Victor Johansson
Olympic Qualifying Time – 7:51.65	1	Turkey	Kuzey Tunçelli
Olympic Qualifying Time – 7:51.65	1	Ukraine	Mykhailo Romanchuk
Olympic Qualifying Time – 7:51.65	1	Uzbekistan	Ilia Sibirtsev
Olympic Qualifying Time – 7:51.65	1	Venezuela	Alfonso Mestre
Olympic Qualifying Time – 7:51.65	1	Vietnam	Nguyễn Huy Hoàng
Olympic Consideration Time – 7:54.01	1	Belgium	Lucas Henveaux
Universality place	1	Monaco	Théo Druenne
Total	32		

==== Men's 1500 m freestyle ====
Qualifiers for the men's 1500 m freestyle
Qualification standard	No. of athletes	NOC	Qualified swimmers
Olympic Qualifying Time – 15:00.99	2	France	David Aubry; Damien Joly
Olympic Qualifying Time – 15:00.99	2	Germany	Sven Schwarz; Florian Wellbrock
Olympic Qualifying Time – 15:00.99	2	Hungary	Dávid Betlehem; Zalán Sárkány
Olympic Qualifying Time – 15:00.99	2	Italy	Luca De Tullio; Gregorio Paltrinieri
Olympic Qualifying Time – 15:00.99	2	Turkey	Emir Batur Albayrak; Kuzey Tunçelli
Olympic Qualifying Time – 15:00.99	2	United States	Bobby Finke; David Johnston
Olympic Qualifying Time – 15:00.99	1	Australia	Samuel Short
Olympic Qualifying Time – 15:00.99	1	China	Fei Liwei
Olympic Qualifying Time – 15:00.99	1	Egypt	Marwan Elkamash
Olympic Qualifying Time – 15:00.99	1	Great Britain	Daniel Jervis
Olympic Qualifying Time – 15:00.99	1	Ireland	Daniel Wiffen
Olympic Qualifying Time – 15:00.99	1	Norway	Henrik Christiansen
Olympic Qualifying Time – 15:00.99	1	Romania	Vlad Stancu
Olympic Qualifying Time – 15:00.99	1	South Korea	Kim Woo-min
Olympic Qualifying Time – 15:00.99	1	Spain	Carlos Garach
Olympic Qualifying Time – 15:00.99	1	Sweden	Victor Johansson
Olympic Qualifying Time – 15:00.99	1	Tunisia	Ahmed Jaouadi
Olympic Qualifying Time – 15:00.99	1	Ukraine	Mykhailo Romanchuk
Olympic Consideration Time – 15:05.49	1	Poland	Krzysztof Chmielewski
Olympic Consideration Time – 15:05.49	1	Vietnam	Nguyễn Huy Hoàng
Universality place	1	Cuba	Rodolfo Falcón Jr
Universality place	1	Greece	Dimitrios Markos
Total	28		

==== Men's 100 m backstroke ====
Qualifiers for the men's 100 m backstroke
Qualification standard	No. of athletes	NOC	Qualified swimmers
Olympic Qualifying Time – 53.74	2	Australia	Isaac Cooper; Bradley Woodward
Olympic Qualifying Time – 53.74	2	Canada	Javier Acevedo; Blake Tierney
Olympic Qualifying Time – 53.74	2	France	Yohann Ndoye-Brouard; Mewen Tomac
Olympic Qualifying Time – 53.74	2	Germany	Ole Braunschweig; Marek Ulrich
Olympic Qualifying Time – 53.74	2	Great Britain	Jonathon Marshall; Oliver Morgan
Olympic Qualifying Time – 53.74	2	Greece	Apostolos Christou; Evangelos Makrygiannis
Olympic Qualifying Time – 53.74	2	Hungary	Ádám Jászó; Hubert Kós
Olympic Qualifying Time – 53.74	2	Italy	Thomas Ceccon; Michele Lamberti
Olympic Qualifying Time – 53.74	2	Switzerland	Thierry Bollin; Roman Mityukov
Olympic Qualifying Time – 53.74	2	United States	Hunter Armstrong; Ryan Murphy
Olympic Qualifying Time – 53.74	1	China	Xu Jiayu
Olympic Qualifying Time – 53.74	1	Czech Republic	Miroslav Knedla
Olympic Qualifying Time – 53.74	1	Israel	Adam Maraana
Olympic Qualifying Time – 53.74	1	Japan	Riku Matsuyama
Olympic Qualifying Time – 53.74	1	Poland	Ksawery Masiuk
Olympic Qualifying Time – 53.74	1	Portugal	João Costa
Olympic Qualifying Time – 53.74	1	South Africa	Pieter Coetze
Olympic Qualifying Time – 53.74	1	South Korea	Lee Ju-ho
Olympic Qualifying Time – 53.74	1	Spain	Hugo González
Olympic Qualifying Time – 53.74	1	Ukraine	Oleksandr Zheltyakov
Olympic Consideration Time – 54.01	1	Argentina	Ulises Saravia
Olympic Consideration Time – 54.01	1	Netherlands	Kai van Westerling
Universality place	1	Austria	Bernhard Reitshammer
Universality place	1	Benin	Alexis Kpadi
Universality place	1	Bermuda	Jack Harvey
Universality place	1	Brunei	Zeke Chan
Universality place	1	Colombia	Anthony Rincón
Universality place	1	Georgia	Noe Pantskhava
Universality place	1	Grenada	Zackary Gresham
Universality place	1	India	Srihari Nataraj
Universality place	1	New Zealand	Kane Follows
Universality place	1	Palestine	Yazan Al-Bawwab
Universality place	1	Puerto Rico	Yeziel Morales
Universality place	1	Tonga	Alan Uhi
Universality place	1	Turkey	Berke Saka
Universality place	1	Virgin Islands	Maximillian Wilson
Total	46		

==== Men's 200 m backstroke ====
Qualifiers for the men's 200 m backstroke
Qualification standard	No. of athletes	NOC	Qualified swimmers
Olympic Qualifying Time – 1:57.50	2	Australia	Se-Bom Lee; Bradley Woodward
Olympic Qualifying Time – 1:57.50	2	France	Yohann Ndoye-Brouard; Mewen Tomac
Olympic Qualifying Time – 1:57.50	2	Great Britain	Luke Greenbank; Oliver Morgan
Olympic Qualifying Time – 1:57.50	2	Greece	Apostolos Christou; Apostolos Siskos
Olympic Qualifying Time – 1:57.50	2	Hungary	Hubert Kós; Ádám Telegdy
Olympic Qualifying Time – 1:57.50	2	Japan	Keita Sunama; Hidekazu Takehara
Olympic Qualifying Time – 1:57.50	2	United States	Keaton Jones; Ryan Murphy
Olympic Qualifying Time – 1:57.50	1	Canada	Blake Tierney
Olympic Qualifying Time – 1:57.50	1	China	Xu Jiayu
Olympic Qualifying Time – 1:57.50	1	Germany	Lukas Märtens
Olympic Qualifying Time – 1:57.50	1	Italy	Matteo Restivo
Olympic Qualifying Time – 1:57.50	1	Netherlands	Kai van Westerling
Olympic Qualifying Time – 1:57.50	1	New Zealand	Kane Follows
Olympic Qualifying Time – 1:57.50	1	Poland	Ksawery Masiuk
Olympic Qualifying Time – 1:57.50	1	South Africa	Pieter Coetze
Olympic Qualifying Time – 1:57.50	1	South Korea	Lee Ju-ho
Olympic Qualifying Time – 1:57.50	1	Spain	Hugo González
Olympic Qualifying Time – 1:57.50	1	Switzerland	Roman Mityukov
Olympic Qualifying Time – 1:57.50	1	Ukraine	Oleksandr Zheltyakov
Olympic Consideration Time – 1:58.09	1	Puerto Rico	Yeziel Morales
Universality place	1	Sudan	Ziyad Saleem
Universality place	1	Zimbabwe	Denilson Cyprianos
Total	30		

==== Men's 100 m breaststroke ====
Qualifiers for the men's 100 m breaststroke
Qualification standard	No. of athletes	NOC	Qualified swimmers
Olympic Qualifying Time – 59.49	2	Australia	Samuel Williamson; Joshua Yong
Olympic Qualifying Time – 59.49	2	China	Qin Haiyang; Sun Jiajun
Olympic Qualifying Time – 59.49	2	Germany	Melvin Imoudu; Lucas Matzerath
Olympic Qualifying Time – 59.49	2	Great Britain	Adam Peaty; James Wilby
Olympic Qualifying Time – 59.49	2	Individual Neutral Athletes	Ilya Shymanovich; Evgenii Somov
Olympic Qualifying Time – 59.49	2	Italy	Nicolò Martinenghi; Ludovico Viberti
Olympic Qualifying Time – 59.49	2	Netherlands	Caspar Corbeau; Arno Kamminga
Olympic Qualifying Time – 59.49	2	United States	Nic Fink; Charlie Swanson
Olympic Qualifying Time – 59.49	1	Japan	Taku Taniguchi
Olympic Qualifying Time – 59.49	1	Kyrgyzstan	Denis Petrashov
Olympic Qualifying Time – 59.49	1	Lithuania	Andrius Šidlauskas
Olympic Qualifying Time – 59.49	1	South Korea	Choi Dong-yeol
Olympic Qualifying Time – 59.49	1	Turkey	Berkay Ömer Öğretir
Olympic Consideration Time – 59.79	1	Austria	Bernhard Reitshammer
Olympic Consideration Time – 59.79	1	Poland	Jan Kałusowski
Universality place	1	Antigua and Barbuda	Jadon Wuilliez
Universality place	1	American Samoa	Micah Masei
Universality place	1	Botswana	Adrian Robinson
Universality place	1	Bulgaria	Lyubomir Epitropov
Universality place	1	Eswatini	Chadd Ning
Universality place	1	Federated States of Micronesia	Tasi Limtiaco
Universality place	1	Haiti	Alexandre Grand'Pierre
Universality place	1	Iceland	Anton McKee
Universality place	1	Israel	Ron Polonsky
Universality place	1	Laos	Steven Insixiengmay
Universality place	1	Madagascar	Jonathan Raharvel
Universality place	1	Mexico	Miguel de Lara
Universality place	1	Mozambique	Matthew Lawrence
Universality place	1	Qatar	Abdul Aziz Al-Obaidly
Universality place	1	Sweden	Erik Persson
Total	38		

==== Men's 200 m breaststroke ====
Qualifiers for the men's 200 m breaststroke
Qualification standard	No. of athletes	NOC	Qualified swimmers
Olympic Qualifying Time – 2:09.68	2	Australia	Zac Stubblety-Cook; Joshua Yong
Olympic Qualifying Time – 2:09.68	2	China	Dong Zhihao; Qin Haiyang
Olympic Qualifying Time – 2:09.68	2	Japan	Yu Hanaguruma; Ippei Watanabe
Olympic Qualifying Time – 2:09.68	2	Netherlands	Caspar Corbeau; Arno Kamminga
Olympic Qualifying Time – 2:09.68	2	United States	Matt Fallon; Josh Matheny
Olympic Qualifying Time – 2:09.68	1	Bulgaria	Lyubomir Epitropov
Olympic Qualifying Time – 2:09.68	1	Finland	Matti Mattsson
Olympic Qualifying Time – 2:09.68	1	France	Léon Marchand
Olympic Qualifying Time – 2:09.68	1	Iceland	Anton McKee
Olympic Qualifying Time – 2:09.68	1	Lithuania	Aleksas Savickas
Olympic Qualifying Time – 2:09.68	1	Mexico	Miguel de Lara
Olympic Qualifying Time – 2:09.68	1	South Korea	Cho Sung-jae
Olympic Qualifying Time – 2:09.68	1	Sweden	Erik Persson
Olympic Consideration Time – 2:10.33	1	Poland	Jan Kałusowski
Universality place	1	Bahrain	Saud Ghali
Universality place	1	Honduras	Julio Horrego
Universality place	1	Jordan	Amro Al-Wir
Universality place	1	Kyrgyzstan	Denis Petrashov
Universality place	1	Latvia	Daniils Bobrovs
Universality place	1	Panama	Tyler Christianson
Total	25		

==== Men's 100 m butterfly ====
Qualifiers for the men's 100 m butterfly
Qualification standard	No. of athletes	NOC	Qualified swimmers
Olympic Qualifying Time – 51.67	2	Australia	Ben Armbruster; Matthew Temple
Olympic Qualifying Time – 51.67	2	Canada	Ilya Kharun; Josh Liendo
Olympic Qualifying Time – 51.67	2	China	Sun Jiajun; Wang Changhao
Olympic Qualifying Time – 51.67	2	France	Maxime Grousset; Clément Secchi
Olympic Qualifying Time – 51.67	2	Hungary	Hubert Kós; Kristóf Milák
Olympic Qualifying Time – 51.67	2	Israel	Tomer Frankel; Gal Groumi
Olympic Qualifying Time – 51.67	2	Japan	Katsuhiro Matsumoto; Naoki Mizunuma
Olympic Qualifying Time – 51.67	2	South Africa	Chad le Clos; Matthew Sates
Olympic Qualifying Time – 51.67	2	United States	Caeleb Dressel; Thomas Heilman
Olympic Qualifying Time – 51.67	1	Austria	Simon Bucher
Olympic Qualifying Time – 51.67	1	Brazil	Kayky Mota
Olympic Qualifying Time – 51.67	1	Bulgaria	Josif Miladinov
Olympic Qualifying Time – 51.67	1	Czech Republic	Daniel Gracík
Olympic Qualifying Time – 51.67	1	Great Britain	James Guy
Olympic Qualifying Time – 51.67	1	Netherlands	Nyls Korstanje
Olympic Qualifying Time – 51.67	1	Poland	Jakub Majerski
Olympic Qualifying Time – 51.67	1	Portugal	Diogo Ribeiro
Olympic Qualifying Time – 51.67	1	Spain	Mario Mollà
Olympic Qualifying Time – 51.67	1	Switzerland	Noè Ponti
Olympic Consideration Time – 51.93	1	Kazakhstan	Adilbek Mussin
Universality place	1	Croatia	Nikola Miljenić
Universality place	1	Indonesia	Joe Kurniawan
Universality place	1	Iraq	Hasan Al-Zinkee
Universality place	1	Jamaica	Josh Kirlew
Universality place	1	Montenegro	Miloš Milenković
Universality place	1	New Zealand	Cameron Gray
Universality place	1	Philippines	Jarod Hatch
Universality place	1	Rwanda	Oscar Peyre Mitilla
Universality place	1	Uganda	Jesse Ssengonzi
Universality place	1	Yemen	Yusuf Nasser
Total	40		

==== Men's 200 m butterfly ====
Qualifiers for the men's 200 m butterfly
Qualification standard	No. of athletes	NOC	Qualified swimmers
Olympic Qualifying Time – 1:55.78	2	Hungary	Richárd Márton; Kristóf Milák
Olympic Qualifying Time – 1:55.78	2	Italy	Giacomo Carini; Alberto Razzetti
Olympic Qualifying Time – 1:55.78	2	Japan	Tomoru Honda; Genki Terakado
Olympic Qualifying Time – 1:55.78	2	Poland	Krzysztof Chmielewski; Michał Chmielewski
Olympic Qualifying Time – 1:55.78	2	United States	Thomas Heilman; Luca Urlando
Olympic Qualifying Time – 1:55.78	1	Australia	Matthew Temple
Olympic Qualifying Time – 1:55.78	1	Austria	Martin Espernberger
Olympic Qualifying Time – 1:55.78	1	Brazil	Nicolas Albiero
Olympic Qualifying Time – 1:55.78	1	Canada	Ilya Kharun
Olympic Qualifying Time – 1:55.78	1	China	Niu Guangsheng
Olympic Qualifying Time – 1:55.78	1	Estonia	Kregor Zirk
Olympic Qualifying Time – 1:55.78	1	France	Léon Marchand
Olympic Qualifying Time – 1:55.78	1	South Africa	Matthew Sates
Olympic Qualifying Time – 1:55.78	1	South Korea	Kim Min-seop
Olympic Qualifying Time – 1:55.78	1	Spain	Arbidel González
Olympic Qualifying Time – 1:55.78	1	Switzerland	Noè Ponti
Olympic Qualifying Time – 1:55.78	1	Chinese Taipei	Wang Kuan-hung
Olympic Qualifying Time – 1:55.78	1	Ukraine	Denys Kesil
Olympic Consideration Time – 1:56.36	1	Bulgaria	Petar Mitsin
Olympic Consideration Time – 1:56.36	1	New Zealand	Lewis Clareburt
Universality place	1	Azerbaijan	Ramil Valizada
Universality place	1	Nicaragua	Gerald Hernández
Invitational place	1	Refugee Olympic Team	Matin Balsini
Total	28		

==== Men's 200 m individual medley ====
Qualifiers for the men's 200 m individual medley
Qualification standard	No. of athletes	NOC	Qualified swimmers
Olympic Qualifying Time – 1:57.94	2	Australia	Thomas Neill; William Petric
Olympic Qualifying Time – 1:57.94	2	Great Britain	Tom Dean; Duncan Scott
Olympic Qualifying Time – 1:57.94	2	United States	Shaine Casas; Carson Foster
Olympic Qualifying Time – 1:57.94	1	Canada	Finlay Knox
Olympic Qualifying Time – 1:57.94	1	China	Wang Shun
Olympic Qualifying Time – 1:57.94	1	France	Léon Marchand
Olympic Qualifying Time – 1:57.94	1	Hungary	Gábor Zombori
Olympic Qualifying Time – 1:57.94	1	Israel	Ron Polonsky
Olympic Qualifying Time – 1:57.94	1	Italy	Alberto Razzetti
Olympic Qualifying Time – 1:57.94	1	Japan	Daiya Seto
Olympic Qualifying Time – 1:57.94	1	New Zealand	Lewis Clareburt
Olympic Qualifying Time – 1:57.94	1	South Africa	Matthew Sates
Olympic Qualifying Time – 1:57.94	1	Spain	Hugo González
Olympic Consideration Time – 1:58.53	1	Greece	Apostolos Papastamos
Olympic Consideration Time – 1:58.53	1	Switzerland	Jérémy Desplanches
Olympic Consideration Time – 1:58.53	1	Turkey	Berke Saka
Universality place	1	Algeria	Jaouad Syoud
Universality place	1	Bolivia	Esteban Núñez del Prado
Universality place	1	Ecuador	Tomas Peribonio
Universality place	1	Guatemala	Erick Gordillo
Universality place	1	Paraguay	Mateo Matheos
Universality place	1	Seychelles	Simon Bachmann
Total	25		

==== Men's 400 m individual medley ====
Qualifiers for the men's 400 m individual medley
Qualification standard	No. of athletes	NOC	Qualified swimmers
Olympic Qualifying Time – 4:12.50	2	Australia	William Petric; Brendon Smith
Olympic Qualifying Time – 4:12.50	2	Hungary	Balázs Holló; Gábor Zombori
Olympic Qualifying Time – 4:12.50	2	Japan	Tomoyuki Matsushita; Daiya Seto
Olympic Qualifying Time – 4:12.50	2	United States	Carson Foster; Chase Kalisz
Olympic Qualifying Time – 4:12.50	1	Canada	Tristan Jankovics
Olympic Qualifying Time – 4:12.50	1	China	Zhang Zhanshuo
Olympic Qualifying Time – 4:12.50	1	France	Léon Marchand
Olympic Qualifying Time – 4:12.50	1	Germany	Cedric Büssing
Olympic Qualifying Time – 4:12.50	1	Great Britain	Max Litchfield
Olympic Qualifying Time – 4:12.50	1	Greece	Apostolos Papastamos
Olympic Qualifying Time – 4:12.50	1	Italy	Alberto Razzetti
Olympic Qualifying Time – 4:12.50	1	New Zealand	Lewis Clareburt
Olympic Consideration Time – 4:13.76	0	—N/a	
Universality place	0	—N/a	
Total	16		

==== Women's 50 m freestyle ====
Qualifiers for the women's 50 m freestyle
Qualification standard	No. of athletes	NOC	Qualified swimmers
Olympic Qualifying Time – 24.70	2	Australia	Meg Harris; Shayna Jack
Olympic Qualifying Time – 24.70	2	China	Wu Qingfeng; Zhang Yufei
Olympic Qualifying Time – 24.70	2	France	Béryl Gastaldello; Mélanie Henique
Olympic Qualifying Time – 24.70	2	Netherlands	Kim Busch; Valerie van Roon
Olympic Qualifying Time – 24.70	2	Poland	Kornelia Fiedkiewicz; Katarzyna Wasick
Olympic Qualifying Time – 24.70	2	Sweden	Michelle Coleman; Sarah Sjöström
Olympic Qualifying Time – 24.70	2	United States	Simone Manuel; Gretchen Walsh
Olympic Qualifying Time – 24.70	1	Belgium	Florine Gaspard
Olympic Qualifying Time – 24.70	1	Canada	Taylor Ruck
Olympic Qualifying Time – 24.70	1	Croatia	Jana Pavalić
Olympic Qualifying Time – 24.70	1	Denmark	Julie Kepp Jensen
Olympic Qualifying Time – 24.70	1	Great Britain	Anna Hopkin
Olympic Qualifying Time – 24.70	1	Greece	Theodora Drakou
Olympic Qualifying Time – 24.70	1	Hong Kong	Siobhán Haughey
Olympic Qualifying Time – 24.70	1	Hungary	Petra Senánszky
Olympic Qualifying Time – 24.70	1	Ireland	Danielle Hill
Olympic Qualifying Time – 24.70	1	Slovenia	Neža Klančar
Olympic Consideration Time – 24.82	0	—N/a	
Universality place
Universality place	1	Aruba	Chloë Farro
Universality place	1	Azerbaijan	Mariam Sheikhalizadeh
Universality place	1	Bahamas	Rhanishka Gibbs
Universality place	1	Bangladesh	Sonia Aktar
Universality place	1	Benin	Ionnah Eliane Douillet
Universality place	1	Bolivia	María José Ribera
Universality place	1	Brunei	Hayley Wong
Universality place	1	Burkina Faso	Iman Kouraogo
Universality place	1	Burundi	Lois Eliona Irishura
Universality place	1	Cambodia	Apsara Sakbun
Universality place	1	Cameroon	Grace Manuela Nguelo'O
Universality place	1	Central African Republic	Tracy Marine Andet
Universality place	1	Comoros	Maesha Saadi
Universality place	1	Democratic Republic of the Congo	Divine Miansadi Mpolo
Universality place	1	Djibouti	Nina Amison
Universality place	1	Dominica	Jasmine Schofield
Universality place	1	Timor-Leste	Imelda Ximenes Belo
Universality place	1	Ecuador	Anicka Delgado
Universality place	1	Eritrea	Christina Rach
Universality place	1	Ethiopia	Lina Alemayehu Selo
Universality place	1	Federated States of Micronesia	Kestra Kihleng
Universality place	1	Fiji	Anahira McCutcheon
Universality place	1	Gabon	Noëlie Lacour
Universality place	1	Ghana	Joselle Mensah
Universality place	1	Guinea	Djenabou Jolie Bah
Universality place	1	Haiti	Mayah Choulote
Universality place	1	Jamaica	Sabrina Lyn
Universality place	1	Kenya	Maria Brunlehner
Universality place	1	Kosovo	Hana Beiqi
Universality place	1	Kyrgyzstan	Elizaveta Pecherskikh
Universality place	1	Madagascar	Antsa Rabejaona
Universality place	1	Malawi	Tayamika Chang'anamuno
Universality place	1	Maldives	Aishath Ulya Shaig
Universality place	1	Mali	Aichata Diabate
Universality place	1	Marshall Islands	Kayla Hepler
Universality place	1	Montenegro	Jovana Kuljača
Universality place	1	Niger	Salima Youssoufou
Universality place	1	Nigeria	Adaku Nwandu
Universality place	1	Palau	Yuri Hosei
Universality place	1	Papua New Guinea	Georgia-Leigh Vele
Universality place	1	Republic of the Congo	Vanessa Bobimbo
Universality place	1	Rwanda	Lidwine Umuhoza Uwase
Universality place	1	Saint Vincent and the Grenadines	Kennice Aphenie Greene
Universality place	1	Samoa	Kaiya Brown
Universality place	1	Seychelles	Khema Elizabeth
Universality place	1	Sierra Leone	Olamide Sam
Universality place	1	Solomon Islands	Isabella Millar
Universality place	1	Suriname	Kaelyn Djoparto
Universality place	1	Tajikistan	Ekaterina Bordachyova
Universality place	1	Tanzania	Sophia Latiff
Universality place	1	Thailand	Jenjira Srisaard
Universality place	1	Togo	Adèle Gaïtou
Universality place	1	Tonga	Noelani Day
Universality place	1	Vanuatu	Loane Russet
Universality place	1	Zambia	Mia Phiri
Total	79		

==== Women's 100 m freestyle ====
Qualifiers for the women's 100 m freestyle
Qualification standard	No. of athletes	NOC	Qualified swimmers
Olympic Qualifying Time – 53.61	2	Australia	Mollie O'Callaghan; Shayna Jack
Olympic Qualifying Time – 53.61	2	China	Wu Qingfeng; Yang Junxuan
Olympic Qualifying Time – 53.61	2	Great Britain	Freya Anderson; Anna Hopkin
Olympic Qualifying Time – 53.61	2	Sweden	Michelle Coleman; Sarah Sjöström
Olympic Qualifying Time – 53.61	2	United States	Kate Douglass; Torri Huske
Olympic Qualifying Time – 53.61	1	Czech Republic	Barbora Seemanová
Olympic Qualifying Time – 53.61	1	France	Marie Wattel
Olympic Qualifying Time – 53.61	1	Hong Kong	Siobhán Haughey
Olympic Qualifying Time – 53.61	1	Netherlands	Marrit Steenbergen
Olympic Consideration Time – 53.88	1	Canada	Maggie Mac Neil
Olympic Consideration Time – 53.88	1	Croatia	Jana Pavalić
Olympic Consideration Time – 53.88	1	Iceland	Snæfríður Jórunnardóttir
Olympic Consideration Time – 53.88	1	Poland	Kornelia Fiedkiewicz
Olympic Consideration Time – 53.88	1	Slovenia	Neža Klančar
Universality place	1	Algeria	Nesrine Medjahed
Universality place	1	Botswana	Maxine Egner
Universality place	1	Cayman Islands	Jillian Crooks
Universality place	1	Cyprus	Kalia Antoniou
Universality place	1	Grenada	Tilly Collymore
Universality place	1	Guyana	Aleka Persaud
Universality place	1	Philippines	Kayla Sanchez
Universality place	1	Sudan	Rana Saadeldin
Universality place	1	Uganda	Gloria Muzito
Universality place	1	Zimbabwe	Paige van der Westhuizen
Total	29		

==== Women's 200 m freestyle ====
Qualifiers for the women's 200 m freestyle
Qualification standard	No. of athletes	NOC	Qualified swimmers
Olympic Qualifying Time – 1:57.26	2	Australia	Mollie O'Callaghan; Ariarne Titmus
Olympic Qualifying Time – 1:57.26	2	China	Li Bingjie; Yang Junxuan
Olympic Qualifying Time – 1:57.26	2	Hungary	Minna Ábrahám; Nikolett Pádár
Olympic Qualifying Time – 1:57.26	2	United States	Katie Ledecky; Claire Weinstein
Olympic Qualifying Time – 1:57.26	1	Belgium	Valentine Dumont
Olympic Qualifying Time – 1:57.26	1	Brazil	Maria Fernanda Costa
Olympic Qualifying Time – 1:57.26	1	Canada	Mary-Sophie Harvey
Olympic Qualifying Time – 1:57.26	1	Czech Republic	Barbora Seemanová
Olympic Qualifying Time – 1:57.26	1	Germany	Julia Mrozinski
Olympic Qualifying Time – 1:57.26	1	Hong Kong	Siobhán Haughey
Olympic Qualifying Time – 1:57.26	1	New Zealand	Erika Fairweather
Olympic Qualifying Time – 1:57.26	1	South Africa	Aimee Canny
Olympic Consideration Time – 1:57.85	1	Iceland	Snæfríður Jórunnardóttir
Olympic Consideration Time – 1:57.85	1	Israel	Lea Polonsky
Universality place	1	Albania	Kaltra Meca
Universality place	1	Cuba	Andrea Becali
Universality place	1	Egypt	Lojine Abdalla Salah
Universality place	1	Honduras	Julimar Ávila
Universality place	1	India	Dhinidhi Desinghu
Universality place	1	Laos	Ariana Dirkzwager
Universality place	1	Mongolia	Batbayaryn Enkhkhüslen
Universality place	1	Nepal	Duana Lama
Universality place	1	Pakistan	Jehanara Nabi
Universality place	1	Romania	Rebecca Diaconescu
Universality place	1	Saudi Arabia	Mashael Meshari A Alayed
Universality place	1	United Arab Emirates	Maha Al-Shehhi
Universality place	1	Venezuela	María Yegres
Total	31		

==== Women's 400 m freestyle ====
Qualifiers for the women's 400 m freestyle
Qualification standard	No. of athletes	NOC	Qualified swimmers
Olympic Qualifying Time – 4:07.90	2	Australia	Jamie Perkins; Ariarne Titmus
Olympic Qualifying Time – 4:07.90	2	Brazil	Maria Fernanda Costa; Gabrielle Roncatto
Olympic Qualifying Time – 4:07.90	2	Canada	Mary-Sophie Harvey; Summer McIntosh
Olympic Qualifying Time – 4:07.90	2	China	Li Bingjie; Liu Yaxin
Olympic Qualifying Time – 4:07.90	2	Germany	Isabel Gose; Leonie Märtens
Olympic Qualifying Time – 4:07.90	2	New Zealand	Erika Fairweather; Eve Thomas
Olympic Qualifying Time – 4:07.90	2	United States	Katie Ledecky; Paige Madden
Olympic Qualifying Time – 4:07.90	1	Belgium	Valentine Dumont
Olympic Qualifying Time – 4:07.90	1	France	Anastasiia Kirpichnikova
Olympic Qualifying Time – 4:07.90	1	Hungary	Ajna Késely
Olympic Qualifying Time – 4:07.90	1	Italy	Simona Quadarella
Olympic Qualifying Time – 4:07.90	1	Japan	Waka Kobori
Olympic Consideration Time – 4:09.14	1	Argentina	Agostina Hein
Universality place	1	Jordan	Karin Belbeisi
Universality place	1	Uzbekistan	Anastasiya Zelinskaya
Universality place	1	Virgin Islands	Natalia Kuipers
Total	23		

==== Women's 800 m freestyle ====
Qualifiers for the women's 800 m freestyle
Qualification standard	No. of athletes	NOC	Qualified swimmers
Olympic Qualifying Time – 8:26.71	2	Australia	Ariarne Titmus; Lani Pallister
Olympic Qualifying Time – 8:26.71	2	New Zealand	Erika Fairweather; Eve Thomas
Olympic Qualifying Time – 8:26.71	2	United States	Katie Ledecky; Paige Madden
Olympic Qualifying Time – 8:26.71	1	China	Li Bingjie
Olympic Qualifying Time – 8:26.71	1	France	Anastasiia Kirpichnikova
Olympic Qualifying Time – 8:26.71	1	Germany	Isabel Gose
Olympic Qualifying Time – 8:26.71	1	Hungary	Ajna Késely
Olympic Qualifying Time – 8:26.71	1	Italy	Simona Quadarella
Olympic Consideration Time – 8:29.24	1	Argentina	Agostina Hein
Olympic Consideration Time – 8:29.24	1	Brazil	Maria Fernanda Costa
Olympic Consideration Time – 8:29.24	1	Chile	Kristel Köbrich
Olympic Consideration Time – 8:29.24	1	Singapore	Gan Ching Hwee
Universality place	1	North Macedonia	Eva Petrovska
Universality place	1	Tunisia	Jamila Boulakbech
Total	17		

==== Women's 1500 m freestyle ====
Qualifiers for the women's 1500 m freestyle
Qualification standard	No. of athletes	NOC	Qualified swimmers
Olympic Qualifying Time – 16:09.09	2	Australia	Moesha Johnson; Lani Pallister
Olympic Qualifying Time – 16:09.09	2	China	Gao Weizhong; Li Bingjie
Olympic Qualifying Time – 16:09.09	2	Germany	Isabel Gose; Leonie Märtens
Olympic Qualifying Time – 16:09.09	2	Italy	Simona Quadarella; Ginevra Taddeucci
Olympic Qualifying Time – 16:09.09	2	United States	Katie Grimes; Katie Ledecky
Olympic Qualifying Time – 16:09.09	1	Brazil	Beatriz Dizotti
Olympic Qualifying Time – 16:09.09	1	France	Anastasiia Kirpichnikova
Olympic Qualifying Time – 16:09.09	1	Hungary	Vivien Jackl
Olympic Qualifying Time – 16:09.09	1	New Zealand	Eve Thomas
Olympic Consideration Time – 16:13.94	1	Chile	Kristel Köbrich
Olympic Consideration Time – 16:13.94	1	Singapore	Gan Ching Hwee
Universality place	1	Malta	Sasha Gatt
Total	17		

==== Women's 100 m backstroke ====
Qualifiers for the women's 100 m backstroke
Qualification standard	No. of athletes	NOC	Qualified swimmers
Olympic Qualifying Time – 59.99	2	Australia	Iona Anderson; Kaylee McKeown
Olympic Qualifying Time – 59.99	2	Canada	Kylie Masse; Ingrid Wilm
Olympic Qualifying Time – 59.99	2	China	Wan Letian; Wang Xueer
Olympic Qualifying Time – 59.99	2	France	Béryl Gastaldello; Emma Terebo
Olympic Qualifying Time – 59.99	2	Great Britain	Kathleen Dawson; Medi Harris
Olympic Qualifying Time – 59.99	2	Netherlands	Maaike de Waard; Kira Toussaint
Olympic Qualifying Time – 59.99	2	United States	Katharine Berkoff; Regan Smith
Olympic Qualifying Time – 59.99	1	Belgium	Roos Vanotterdijk
Olympic Qualifying Time – 59.99	1	Individual Neutral Athletes	Anastasiya Shkurdai
Olympic Qualifying Time – 59.99	1	Ireland	Danielle Hill
Olympic Qualifying Time – 59.99	1	Poland	Adela Piskorska
Olympic Qualifying Time – 59.99	1	Spain	Carmen Weiler
Olympic Qualifying Time – 59.99	1	Sweden	Louise Hansson
Olympic Consideration Time – 1:00.29	1	Bulgaria	Gabriela Georgieva
Olympic Consideration Time – 1:00.29	1	Hong Kong	Cindy Cheung
Olympic Consideration Time – 1:00.29	1	Israel	Aviv Barzelay
Universality place	1	Bahrain	Amani Al-Obaidli
Universality place	1	Bermuda	Emma Harvey
Universality place	1	Dominican Republic	Elizabeth Jiménez
Universality place	1	El Salvador	Celina Márquez
Universality place	1	Guatemala	Lucero Mejía
Universality place	1	Kazakhstan	Kseniya Ignatova
Universality place	1	Libya	Maleek Al-Mukhtar
Universality place	1	Mexico	Celia Pulido
Universality place	1	Mozambique	Denise Donelli
Universality place	1	Sri Lanka	Ganga Seneviratne
Universality place	1	Trinidad and Tobago	Zuri Ferguson
Universality place	1	Turkmenistan	Aynura Primova
Universality place	1	Ukraine	Nika Sharafutdinova
Total	36		

==== Women's 200 m backstroke ====
Qualifiers for the women's 200 m backstroke
Qualification standard	No. of athletes	NOC	Qualified swimmers
Olympic Qualifying Time – 2:10.39	2	Australia	Jaclyn Barclay; Kaylee McKeown
Olympic Qualifying Time – 2:10.39	2	Canada	Kylie Masse; Regan Rathwell
Olympic Qualifying Time – 2:10.39	2	China	Liu Yaxin; Peng Xuwei
Olympic Qualifying Time – 2:10.39	2	France	Pauline Mahieu; Emma Terebo
Olympic Qualifying Time – 2:10.39	2	Great Britain	Honey Osrin; Katie Shanahan
Olympic Qualifying Time – 2:10.39	2	Hungary	Dóra Molnár; Eszter Szabó-Feltóthy
Olympic Qualifying Time – 2:10.39	2	Israel	Aviv Barzelay; Anastasia Gorbenko
Olympic Qualifying Time – 2:10.39	2	Poland	Laura Bernat; Adela Piskorska
Olympic Qualifying Time – 2:10.39	2	Spain	Carmen Weiler; África Zamorano
Olympic Qualifying Time – 2:10.39	2	United States	Phoebe Bacon; Regan Smith
Olympic Qualifying Time – 2:10.39	1	Bulgaria	Gabriela Georgieva
Olympic Qualifying Time – 2:10.39	1	Hong Kong	Cindy Cheung
Olympic Qualifying Time – 2:10.39	1	Individual Neutral Athletes	Anastasiya Shkurdai
Olympic Qualifying Time – 2:10.39	1	Italy	Margherita Panziera
Olympic Qualifying Time – 2:10.39	1	Portugal	Camila Rebelo
Olympic Qualifying Time – 2:10.39	1	South Korea	Lee Eun-ji
Olympic Consideration Time – 2:11.04	0	—N/a	
Universality place	1	Mauritius	Anishta Teeluck
Universality place	1	Moldova	Tatiana Salcuțan
Total	28		

==== Women's 100 m breaststroke ====
Qualifiers for the women's 100 m breaststroke
Qualification standard	No. of athletes	NOC	Qualified swimmers
Olympic Qualifying Time – 1:06.79	2	China	Tang Qianting; Yang Chang
Olympic Qualifying Time – 1:06.79	2	Italy	Lisa Angiolini; Benedetta Pilato
Olympic Qualifying Time – 1:06.79	2	Japan	Reona Aoki; Satomi Suzuki
Olympic Qualifying Time – 1:06.79	2	Lithuania	Rūta Meilutytė; Kotryna Teterevkova
Olympic Qualifying Time – 1:06.79	2	United States	Lilly King; Emma Weber
Olympic Qualifying Time – 1:06.79	1	Argentina	Macarena Ceballos
Olympic Qualifying Time – 1:06.79	1	Canada	Sophie Angus
Olympic Qualifying Time – 1:06.79	1	Estonia	Eneli Jefimova
Olympic Qualifying Time – 1:06.79	1	Germany	Anna Elendt
Olympic Qualifying Time – 1:06.79	1	Great Britain	Angharad Evans
Olympic Qualifying Time – 1:06.79	1	Individual Neutral Athletes	Alina Zmushka
Olympic Qualifying Time – 1:06.79	1	Ireland	Mona McSharry
Olympic Qualifying Time – 1:06.79	1	Israel	Anastasia Gorbenko
Olympic Qualifying Time – 1:06.79	1	Netherlands	Tes Schouten
Olympic Qualifying Time – 1:06.79	1	Poland	Dominika Sztandera
Olympic Qualifying Time – 1:06.79	1	Singapore	Letitia Sim
Olympic Qualifying Time – 1:06.79	1	South Africa	Tatjana Smith
Olympic Qualifying Time – 1:06.79	1	Sweden	Sophie Hansson
Olympic Consideration Time – 1:07.12	1	Australia	Jenna Strauch
Olympic Consideration Time – 1:07.12	1	Czech Republic	Kristýna Horská
Olympic Consideration Time – 1:07.12	1	Spain	Jessica Vall
Olympic Consideration Time – 1:07.12	1	Switzerland	Lisa Mamié
Universality place	1	Antigua and Barbuda	Ellie Shaw
Universality place	1	Colombia	Stefanía Gómez
Universality place	1	Cook Islands	Lanihei Connolly
Universality place	1	Finland	Ida Hulkko
Universality place	1	The Gambia	Aminata Barrow
Universality place	1	Kuwait	Lara Dashti
Universality place	1	Lebanon	Lynn El Hajj
Universality place	1	Malaysia	Tan Rouxin
Universality place	1	Morocco	Imane El Barodi
Universality place	1	Panama	Emily Santos
Total	37		

==== Women's 200 m breaststroke ====
Qualifiers for the women's 200 m breaststroke
Qualification standard	No. of athletes	NOC	Qualified swimmers
Olympic Qualifying Time – 2:23.91	2	Australia	Ella Ramsay; Jenna Strauch
Olympic Qualifying Time – 2:23.91	2	Canada	Sydney Pickrem; Kelsey Wog
Olympic Qualifying Time – 2:23.91	2	South Africa	Kaylene Corbett; Tatjana Smith
Olympic Qualifying Time – 2:23.91	2	United States	Kate Douglass; Lilly King
Olympic Qualifying Time – 2:23.91	1	China	Ye Shiwen
Olympic Qualifying Time – 2:23.91	1	Czech Republic	Kristýna Horská
Olympic Qualifying Time – 2:23.91	1	Denmark	Thea Blomsterberg
Olympic Qualifying Time – 2:23.91	1	Ireland	Mona McSharry
Olympic Qualifying Time – 2:23.91	1	Italy	Francesca Fangio
Olympic Qualifying Time – 2:23.91	1	Japan	Satomi Suzuki
Olympic Qualifying Time – 2:23.91	1	Lithuania	Kotryna Teterevkova
Olympic Qualifying Time – 2:23.91	1	Netherlands	Tes Schouten
Olympic Consideration Time – 2:24.63	1	Individual Neutral Athletes	Alina Zmushka
Olympic Consideration Time – 2:24.63	1	Argentina	Macarena Ceballos
Olympic Consideration Time – 2:24.63	1	Singapore	Letitia Sim
Olympic Consideration Time – 2:24.63	1	Spain	Jessica Vall
Olympic Consideration Time – 2:24.63	1	Sweden	Sophie Hansson
Olympic Consideration Time – 2:24.63	1	Switzerland	Lisa Mamié
Universality place	1	Estonia	Eneli Jefimova
Total	23		

==== Women's 100 m butterfly ====
Qualifiers for the women's 100 m butterfly
Qualification standard	No. of athletes	NOC	Qualified swimmers
Olympic Qualifying Time – 57.92	2	Australia	Emma McKeon; Alexandria Perkins
Olympic Qualifying Time – 57.92	2	Canada	Maggie Mac Neil; Rebecca Smith
Olympic Qualifying Time – 57.92	2	China	Yu Yiting; Zhang Yufei
Olympic Qualifying Time – 57.92	2	Greece	Georgia Damasioti; Anna Ntountounaki
Olympic Qualifying Time – 57.92	2	Italy	Costanza Cocconcelli; Viola Scotto Di Carlo
Olympic Qualifying Time – 57.92	2	Japan	Mizuki Hirai; Rikako Ikee
Olympic Qualifying Time – 57.92	2	United States	Torri Huske; Gretchen Walsh
Olympic Qualifying Time – 57.92	1	Belgium	Roos Vanotterdijk
Olympic Qualifying Time – 57.92	1	Bosnia and Herzegovina	Lana Pudar
Olympic Qualifying Time – 57.92	1	Czech Republic	Barbora Seemanová
Olympic Qualifying Time – 57.92	1	France	Marie Wattel
Olympic Qualifying Time – 57.92	1	Germany	Angelina Köhler
Olympic Qualifying Time – 57.92	1	Great Britain	Keanna Macinnes
Olympic Qualifying Time – 57.92	1	Netherlands	Tessa Giele
Olympic Qualifying Time – 57.92	1	New Zealand	Hazel Ouwehand
Olympic Qualifying Time – 57.92	1	South Africa	Erin Gallagher
Olympic Qualifying Time – 57.92	1	Sweden	Louise Hansson
Olympic Consideration Time – 58.21	1	Denmark	Helena Rosendahl Bach
Olympic Consideration Time – 58.21	1	Ireland	Ellen Walshe
Olympic Consideration Time – 58.21	1	Spain	Laura Cabañes
Universality place	1	Armenia	Varsenik Manucharyan
Universality place	1	Eswatini	Hayley Hoy
Universality place	1	Georgia	Ana Nizharadze
Universality place	1	Nicaragua	María Schutzmeier
Universality place	1	Paraguay	Luana Alonso
Universality place	1	Senegal	Oumy Diop
Total	33		

==== Women's 200 m butterfly ====
Qualifiers for the women's 200 m butterfly
Qualification standard	No. of athletes	NOC	Qualified swimmers
Olympic Qualifying Time – 2:08.43	2	Australia	Abbey Connor; Elizabeth Dekkers
Olympic Qualifying Time – 2:08.43	2	China	Chen Luying; Zhang Yufei
Olympic Qualifying Time – 2:08.43	2	Great Britain	Keanna Macinnes; Laura Stephens
Olympic Qualifying Time – 2:08.43	2	Japan	Hiroko Makino; Airi Mitsui
Olympic Qualifying Time – 2:08.43	2	United States	Alex Shackell; Regan Smith
Olympic Qualifying Time – 2:08.43	1	Bosnia and Herzegovina	Lana Pudar
Olympic Qualifying Time – 2:08.43	1	Canada	Summer McIntosh
Olympic Qualifying Time – 2:08.43	1	Denmark	Helena Rosendahl Bach
Olympic Qualifying Time – 2:08.43	1	Hungary	Boglárka Kapás
Olympic Consideration Time – 2:09.07	1	Greece	Georgia Damasioti
Olympic Consideration Time – 2:09.07	1	Serbia	Anja Crevar
Olympic Consideration Time – 2:09.07	1	Spain	Laura Cabanes
Universality place	1	Angola	Lia Lima
Universality place	1	Costa Rica	Alondra Ortiz
Total	19		

==== Women's 200 m individual medley ====
Qualifiers for the women's 200 m individual medley
Qualification standard	No. of athletes	NOC	Qualified swimmers
Olympic Qualifying Time – 2:11.47	2	Australia	Kaylee McKeown; Ella Ramsay
Olympic Qualifying Time – 2:11.47	2	Canada	Summer McIntosh; Sydney Pickrem
Olympic Qualifying Time – 2:11.47	2	China	Ye Shiwen; Yu Yiting
Olympic Qualifying Time – 2:11.47	2	Great Britain	Freya Colbert; Abbie Wood
Olympic Qualifying Time – 2:11.47	2	Israel	Anastasia Gorbenko; Lea Polonsky
Olympic Qualifying Time – 2:11.47	2	Japan	Shiho Matsumoto; Yui Ohashi
Olympic Qualifying Time – 2:11.47	2	United States	Kate Douglass; Alex Walsh
Olympic Qualifying Time – 2:11.47	1	Czech Republic	Barbora Seemanová
Olympic Qualifying Time – 2:11.47	1	France	Charlotte Bonnet
Olympic Qualifying Time – 2:11.47	1	Hungary	Dalma Sebestyén
Olympic Qualifying Time – 2:11.47	1	Ireland	Ellen Walshe
Olympic Qualifying Time – 2:11.47	1	Italy	Sara Franceschi
Olympic Qualifying Time – 2:11.47	1	Netherlands	Marrit Steenbergen
Olympic Qualifying Time – 2:11.47	1	South Africa	Rebecca Meder
Olympic Qualifying Time – 2:11.47	1	South Korea	Kim Seo-yeong
Olympic Qualifying Time – 2:11.47	1	Spain	Emma Carrasco
Olympic Consideration Time – 2:12.13	0	—N/a	
Universality place	1	Austria	Lena Kreundl
Universality place	1	Cape Verde	Jayla Pina
Universality place	1	Chinese Taipei	Han An-chi
Universality place	1	Indonesia	Azzahra Permatahani
Universality place	1	Latvia	Ieva Maļuka
Universality place	1	Palestine	Valerie Tarazi
Universality place	1	Peru	McKenna DeBever
Universality place	1	Puerto Rico	Kristen Romano
Universality place	1	Slovakia	Tamara Potocká
Universality place	1	Uruguay	Nicole Frank
Universality place	1	Vietnam	Võ Thị Mỹ Tiên
Total	34		

==== Women's 400 m individual medley ====
Qualifiers for the women's 400 m individual medley
Qualification standard	No. of athletes	NOC	Qualified swimmers
Olympic Qualifying Time – 4:38.53	2	Australia	Jenna Forrester; Ella Ramsay
Olympic Qualifying Time – 4:38.53	2	Canada	Ella Jansen; Summer McIntosh
Olympic Qualifying Time – 4:38.53	2	Great Britain	Freya Colbert; Katie Shanahan
Olympic Qualifying Time – 4:38.53	2	Japan	Mio Narita; Ageha Tanigawa
Olympic Qualifying Time – 4:38.53	2	United States	Katie Grimes; Emma Weyant
Olympic Qualifying Time – 4:38.53	1	Hungary	Vivien Jackl
Olympic Qualifying Time – 4:38.53	1	Ireland	Ellen Walshe
Olympic Qualifying Time – 4:38.53	1	Israel	Anastasia Gorbenko
Olympic Qualifying Time – 4:38.53	1	Italy	Sara Franceschi
Olympic Qualifying Time – 4:38.53	1	Spain	Emma Carrasco
Olympic Consideration Time – 4:39.92	1	Serbia	Anja Crevar
Universality place	0	—N/a	
Total	16		

=== Relay events ===
The relay event qualifiers are listed below.

==== Men's 4 × 100 m freestyle relay ====
Qualifiers for the men's 4 × 100 m freestyle relay
Qualification event	No. of teams	Qualified teams
2023 World Championships medallists	3	Australia; Italy; United States
Fastest times at the 2023 or 2024 World Championships	13	China; Canada; Great Britain; Brazil; Hungary; Greece; Spain; Israel; Germany; Serbia; France; Sweden; Poland
Total	16	

==== Men's 4 × 200 m freestyle relay ====
Qualifiers for the men's 4 × 200 m freestyle relay
Qualification event	No. of teams	Qualified teams
2023 World Championships medallists	3	Great Britain; United States; Australia
Fastest times at the 2023 or 2024 World Championships	13	Italy; France; South Korea; Germany; Brazil; China; Japan; Israel; Greece; Lithuania; Spain; Canada; Switzerland
Total	16	

==== Men's 4 × 100 m medley relay ====
Qualifiers for the men's 4 × 100 m medley relay
Qualification event	No. of teams	Qualified teams
2023 World Championships medallists	3	United States; China; Australia
Fastest times at the 2023 or 2024 World Championships	13	France; Germany; Canada; Japan; Netherlands; Great Britain; Italy; Spain; Poland; South Korea; Austria; Ireland; Switzerland
Total	16	

==== Women's 4 × 100 m freestyle relay ====
Qualifiers for the women's 4 × 100 m freestyle relay
Qualification event	No. of teams	Qualified teams
2023 World Championships medallists	3	Australia; United States; China
Fastest times at the 2023 or 2024 World Championships	13	Great Britain; Sweden; Netherlands; Canada; Italy; France; Poland; Brazil; Hong Kong; Hungary; Denmark; Slovenia; Ireland
Total	16	

==== Women's 4 × 200 m freestyle relay ====
Qualifiers for the women's 4 × 200 m freestyle relay
Qualification event	No. of teams	Qualified teams
2023 World Championships medallists	3	Australia; United States; China
Fastest times at the 2023 or 2024 World Championships	13	Great Britain; Canada; Netherlands; Hungary; New Zealand; Brazil; Japan; Israel; France; Italy; Germany; Spain; Turkey
Total	16	

==== Women's 4 × 100 m medley relay ====
Qualifiers for the women's 4 × 100 m medley relay
Qualification event	No. of teams	Qualified teams
2023 World Championships medallists	3	United States; Australia; Canada
Fastest times at the 2023 or 2024 World Championships	13	Sweden; Netherlands; China; France; Japan; Great Britain; Poland; Italy; Germany; Ireland; Hong Kong; Singapore; Denmark
Total	16	

==== Mixed 4 × 100 m medley relay ====
Qualifiers for the mixed 4 × 100 m medley relay
Qualification event	No. of teams	Qualified teams
2023 World Championships medallists	3	China; Australia; United States
Fastest times at the 2023 or 2024 World Championships	13	Netherlands; Great Britain; Canada; Japan; Germany; Sweden; France; Italy; Poland; Greece; South Korea; Israel; Brazil
Total	16	
