= Saudi Arabia at the 2025 World Aquatics Championships =

- Flag of Saudi Arabia
- World Aquatics code: KSA
- National federation: Saudi Arabian Swimming Federation

in Singapore
- Competitors: 4 in 1 sport
- Medals: Gold 0 Silver 0 Bronze 0 Total 0

World Aquatics Championships appearances
- 2003; 2005; 2007; 2009; 2011–2017; 2019; 2022; 2023; 2024; 2025

Saudi Arabia competed at the 2025 World Aquatics Championships in Singapore from July 11 to August 3, 2025.

== Competitors ==
The following is the list of competitors in the Championships.

Sport	Men	Women	Total
Swimming	2	2	4
Total	2	2	4

== Swimming ==
Saudi Arabia entered 4 swimmers.

Men

Athlete	Event	Heat		Semi-final		Final	
Athlete	Event	Time	Rank	Time	Rank	Time	Rank
Mohammed Al-Otaibi	100 m breaststroke	1:05.02	57	Did not advance			
Mohammed Al-Otaibi	200 m breaststroke	Disqualified		Did not advance			
Yousif Bu Arish	50 m butterfly	25.15	57	Did not advance			
Yousif Bu Arish	100 m butterfly	55.99 NR	57	Did not advance			

Women

Athlete	Event	Heat		Semi-final		Final	
Athlete	Event	Time	Rank	Time	Rank	Time	Rank
Mashael Alayed	100 m freestyle	1:04.98	73	Did not advance			
Mashael Alayed	50 m butterfly	30.70	71	Did not advance			
Lana Al-Rasheed	50 m freestyle	30.80	88	Did not advance			
Lana Al-Rasheed	50 m backstroke	33.87	60	Did not advance			
