= List of Saudi Arabian records in swimming =

The Saudi Arabian records in swimming are the fastest ever performances of swimmers from Saudi Arabia, which are recognised and ratified by the Saudi Swimming Federation (SSF).

All records were set in finals unless noted otherwise.

== Long course (50 m) ==
=== Men ===
Event	Time		Name	Club	Date	Meet	Location	Ref
50 m freestyle	22.11		Emad Zaben	Saudi Arabia	21 September 2026 (Note: by official result source; 20 September by SSF source, a typo)	Asian Games	Tokyo, Japan	
100 m freestyle	49.62		Zaid Al-Sarraj	Saudi Arabia	11 November 2025	Islamic Solidarity Games	Riyadh, Saudi Arabia	
200 m freestyle	1:50.44	h	Rami Rahmouni	US Créteil Natation	26 May 2026 (Note: by official result source; 25 May 2026 by SSF source, a typo)	French U18 Championships	Chalon-sur-Saône, France	
400 m freestyle	3:47.86		Rami Rahmouni	Saudi Arabia	3 November 2026 (Note: by official result source; 1 November 2026 by SSF source, a typo)	Youth Olympic Games	Dakar, Senegal	
800 m freestyle	7:54.36		Rami Rahmouni	US Créteil Natation	25 May 2026	French U18 Championships	Chalon-sur-Saône, France	
1500 m freestyle	16:32.64		Mohammed Alzaki	Saudi Arabia	27 August 2024	Arab Championships	Cairo, Egypt	
1500 m freestyle	14:55.32	#	Rami Rahmouni	Saudi Arabia	22 September 2026	Asian Games	Tokyo, Japan	
50 m backstroke	26.41	sf	Ali Al-Essa	Saudi Arabia	11 November 2025	Islamic Solidarity Games	Riyadh, Saudi Arabia	
100 m backstroke	57.35	h	Ali Al-Essa	Saudi Arabia	20 September 2026	Asian Games	Tokyo, Japan	
200 m backstroke	2:07.88		Ali Al-Essa	Saudi Arabia	13 May 2026	GCC Games	Doha, Qatar	
50 m breaststroke	28.89		Ahmed Al-Kudmani	Saudi Arabia	31 August 2005	GCC Championships	Kuwait	
100 m breaststroke	1:03.63	h	Sultan Alotaibi	Misk	24 May 2025	AP Race London International	London, Great Britain	
200 m breaststroke	2:19.53		Mohammed Alotaibi	Al Qadisiyah	5 October 2024	Saudi Games	Riyadh, Saudi Arabia	
50 m butterfly	24.40		Yousif Buarish	Saudi Arabia	31 October 2022	-	Riyadh, Saudi Arabia	
100 m butterfly	55.11	h	Bader Almuhana	Saudi Arabia	31 July 2009	World Championships	Rome, Italy	
200 m butterfly	2:05.71		Mohammed Alzaki	Saudi Arabia	29 August 2025	Arab Championships	Casablanca, Morocco	
200 m individual medley	2:08.46		Loai Tashkandi	Saudi Arabia	7 August 2010	GCC Championships	Kuwait City, Kuwait	
400 m individual medley	4:38.79		Loai Tashkandi	Saudi Arabia	9 August 2010	GCC Championships	Kuwait City, Kuwait	
4×100 m freestyle relay	3:20.60		Zaid Al Sarraj (49.68); Emad Zaben (49.35); Mohammed Alzaki (50.90); Ali Al-Essa (50.67)	Saudi Arabia	24 September 2026 (Note: by official result source; 20 September 2026 by SSF source, a typo)	Asian Games	Tokyo, Japan	
4×200 m freestyle relay	7:53.04		Mohammed Alzaki (1:55.29); Mohammed Almaher (1:59.35); Ziyad Almesalim (1:59.36); Zaid Al-Sarraj (1:59.04)	Saudi Arabia	26 August 2024	Arab Championships	Cairo, Egypt	
4×100 m medley relay	3:46.32		Ali Al-Essa (57.40); Sultan Alotaibi (1:03.75); Mohammed Alzaki (55.40); Emad Zaben (49.77)	Saudi Arabia	15 May 2026	GCC Games	Doha, Qatar	

Legend: # – Record awaiting ratification by Saudi Swimming Federation; WR – World record; AS – Asian record; e – equalled existing record;
Records not set in finals: h – heat; sf – semifinal; r – relay 1st leg; rh – relay heat 1st leg; b – B final; † – en route to final mark; so – swim-off; tt – time trial

=== Women ===
Event	Time		Name	Club	Date	Meet	Location	Ref
50 m freestyle	28.87	h	Mashael Alayed	Saudi Arabia	8 November 2025	Islamic Solidarity Games	Riyadh, Saudi Arabia	
100 m freestyle	1:02.05	h	Mashael Alayed	Saudi Arabia	10 November 2025	Islamic Solidarity Games	Riyadh, Saudi Arabia	
200 m freestyle	2:16.42		Mashael Alayed	QDS	16 July 2026	Saudi Arabian Women National Championships	Jeddah, Saudi Arabia	
400 m freestyle	4:56.13		Mashael Alayed	Saudi Arabia	13 January 2024	Arab Age Group Championships	Doha, Qatar	
800 m freestyle								
1500 m freestyle								
50 m backstroke	33.87	h	Lana Alrasheed	Saudi Arabia	30 July 2025	World Championships	Singapore, Singapore	
100 m backstroke	1:15.27	h	Lana Alrasheed	Saudi Arabia	11 July 2025	GCC Championships	Manama, Bahrain	
200 m backstroke	2:44.93	h	Jody Alyamani	Saudi Arabia	7 February 2026	Dubai Open Championships	Dubai, United Arab Emirates	
50 m breaststroke	37.84		Fatimah Mizouri	Whales	16 September 2023	Saudi Games Women Qualifying Meet	Dammam, Saudi Arabia	
100 m breaststroke	1:23.97		Mashael Alayed	QDS	7 May 2026	Women Inter-regional Championships	Riyadh, Saudi Arabia	
200 m breaststroke	2:58.33		Mashael Alayed	Saudi Arabia	11 July 2025	GCC Championships	Manama, Bahrain	
50 m butterfly	30.70	h	Mashael Alayed	Saudi Arabia	1 August 2025	World Championships	Singapore, Singapore	
100 m butterfly	1:12.25		Mashael Alayed	Saudi Arabia	28 April 2024	GCC Youth Games	Abu Dhabi, United Arab Emirates	
200 m butterfly								
200 m individual medley	2:37.51		Mashael Alayed	Saudi Arabia	11 July 2025	GCC Championships	Manama, Bahrain	
400 m individual medley								
4×100 m freestyle relay								
4×200 m freestyle relay								
4×100 m medley relay								

Legend: # – Record awaiting ratification by Saudi Swimming Federation; WR – World record; AS – Asian record; e – equalled existing record;
Records not set in finals: h – heat; sf – semifinal; r – relay 1st leg; rh – relay heat 1st leg; b – B final; † – en route to final mark; so – swim-off; tt – time trial

== Short course (25 m) ==
=== Men ===
Event	Time		Name	Club	Date	Meet	Location	Ref
50 m freestyle	22.20		Emad Zaben	NSR	2 April 2026	Inter-regional Championships	Najran, Saudi Arabia	
50 m freestyle	22.01	h, #	Emad Zaben	Saudi Arabia	12 November 2026	Spanish Championships	Madrid, Spain	
100 m freestyle	49.87		Emad Zaben	NSR	2 April 2026	Inter-regional Championships	Najran, Saudi Arabia	
100 m freestyle	49.61	h, #	Emad Zaben	Saudi Arabia	13 November 2026	Spanish Championships	Madrid, Spain	
200 m freestyle	1:52.04		Emad Zaben	NSR	17 October 2025	Saudi Arabian Championships	Al-Ahsa Oasis, Saudi Arabia	
400 m freestyle	4:03.46		Loai Tashkandi	-	24 February 2008			
800 m freestyle	8:30.31		Ghanem Alsulhi	HJR	18 October 2025	Saudi Arabian Championships	Al-Ahsa Oasis, Saudi Arabia	
1500 m freestyle	16:26.39		Loai Tashkandi	-	27 February 2008			
50 m backstroke	25.63		Ali Alessa	QDS	16 October 2025	Saudi Arabian Championships	Al-Ahsa Oasis, Saudi Arabia	
50 m backstroke	25.59	#	Ali Alessa	QDS	4 April 2026	Inter-regional Championships	Hail, Saudi Arabia	
100 m backstroke	56.31		Ali Alessa	QDS	16 October 2025	Saudi Arabian Championships	Al-Ahsa Oasis, Saudi Arabia	
100 m backstroke	56.02	h, #	Ali Alessa	Saudi Arabia	12 November 2026	Spanish Championships	Madrid, Spain	
200 m backstroke	2:05.06		Ali Alessa	QDS	18 October 2025	Saudi Arabian Championships	Al-Ahsa Oasis, Saudi Arabia	
50 m breaststroke	28.56		Ahmed Al-Kudmani	Saudi Arabia	31 October 2007	Asian Indoor Games	Macau, Macau	
50 m breaststroke	28.54	h, #	Emad Zaben	Saudi Arabia	14 November 2026	Spanish Championships	Madrid, Spain	
100 m breaststroke	1:00.76	h	Mohammed Alotaibi	Saudi Arabia	11 December 2024	World Championships	Budapest, Hungary	
200 m breaststroke	2:16.10	h	Mohammed Alotaibi	Saudi Arabia	13 December 2024	World Championships	Budapest, Hungary	
50 m butterfly	24.83		Meshari Alsamhan	SWR	9 October 2026	Regional Championships	Abha, Saudi Arabia	
100 m butterfly	54.06		Yousif Buarish	Saudi Arabia	24 October 2021	Arab Championships	Abu Dhabi, United Arab Emirates	
200 m butterfly	2:04.10		Mohammed Alzaki	QDS	15 October 2026	Inter-regional Championships	Al-Ahsa Oasis, Saudi Arabia	
100 m individual medley	58.35		Mohammed Alzaki	QDS	15 October 2026	Inter-regional Championships	Al-Ahsa Oasis, Saudi Arabia	
200 m individual medley	2:08.61	h, not ratified	Loai Tashkandi	Saudi Arabia	4 November 2009	Asian Indoor Games	Hanoi, Vietnam	
400 m individual medley	4:38.79		Loai Tashkandi	-	12 April 2008			
4×50 m freestyle relay	1:33.79		Ali Alabdlwahab; Ziyad Almesalim; Ali Al-Essa; Emad Zaben	QDS	15 October 2026	Inter-regional Championships	Al-Ahsa Oasis, Saudi Arabia	
4×100 m freestyle relay	3:36.11			Saudi Arabia				
4×200 m freestyle relay	7:58.74			Saudi Arabia				
4×50 m medley relay	1:44.27		Ali Al-Essa; Mohammed Alotaibi; Mohammed Alzaki; Emad Zaben	QDS	15 October 2026	Inter-regional Championships	Al-Ahsa Oasis, Saudi Arabia	
4×100m medley relay	4:09.39	h, not ratified	Amar Al-Humaid (1:04.87); Eisa Al-Nasser (1:09.58); Yousif Buarish (59.48); Faisal Al-Shelati (55.46)	Saudi Arabia	25 September 2017	Asian Indoor and Martial Arts Games	Ashgabat, Turkmenistan	

Legend: # – Record awaiting ratification by Saudi Swimming Federation; WR – World record; AS – Asian record; e – equalled existing record;
Records not set in finals: h – heat; sf – semifinal; r – relay 1st leg; rh – relay heat 1st leg; b – B final; † – en route to final mark; so – swim-off; tt – time trial

=== Women ===
Event	Time	Name	Club	Date	Meet	Location	Ref
50 m freestyle							
100 m freestyle							
200 m freestyle							
400 m freestyle							
800 m freestyle							
1500 m freestyle							
50 m backstroke							
100 m backstroke							
200 m backstroke							
50 m breaststroke							
100 m breaststroke							
200 m breaststroke							
50 m butterfly							
100 m butterfly							
200 m butterfly							
100 m individual medley							
200 m individual medley							
400 m individual medley							
4×50 m freestyle relay							
4×100 m freestyle relay							
4×200 m freestyle relay							
4×50 m medley relay							
4×100 m medley relay							

Legend: # – Record awaiting ratification by Saudi Swimming Federation; WR – World record; AS – Asian record; e – equalled existing record;
Records not set in finals: h – heat; sf – semifinal; r – relay 1st leg; rh – relay heat 1st leg; b – B final; † – en route to final mark; so – swim-off; tt – time trial
