= Bahrain at the 2024 World Aquatics Championships =

- Flag of Bahrain
- FINA code: BRN
- National federation: Bahrain Swimming Association

in Doha, Qatar
- Competitors: 4 in 1 sport
- Medals: Gold 0 Silver 0 Bronze 0 Total 0

World Aquatics Championships appearances
- 1973; 1975; 1978; 1982; 1986; 1991; 1994; 1998; 2001; 2003; 2005; 2007; 2009; 2011; 2013; 2015; 2017; 2019; 2022; 2023; 2024

Bahrain competed at the 2024 World Aquatics Championships in Doha, Qatar from 2 to 18 February.

== Competitors ==
The following is the list of competitors in the Championships.

Sport	Men	Women	Total
Swimming	2	2	4
Total	2	2	4

== Swimming ==
Bahrain entered 4 swimmers.

Men

Athlete	Event	Heat		Semifinal		Final	
Athlete	Event	Time	Rank	Time	Rank	Time	Rank
Saud Ghali	100 metre breaststroke	1:07.19	62	Did not advance			
Saud Ghali	200 metre breaststroke	2:21.94	29	Did not advance			
Ahmed Theibich	200 metre butterfly	2:18.46	38	Did not advance			
Ahmed Theibich	400 metre individual medley	4:54.79	23	—		Did not advance	

Women

Athlete	Event	Heat		Semifinal		Final	
Athlete	Event	Time	Rank	Time	Rank	Time	Rank
Amani Alobaidli	50 metre freestyle	26.87	52	Did not advance			
Amani Alobaidli	100 metre freestyle	1:06.06	45	Did not advance			
Noor Yussuf Abdulla	100 metre freestyle	1:03.22	64	Did not advance			
Noor Yussuf Abdulla	50 metre backstroke	32.39	48	Did not advance			

Mixed

Athlete	Event	Heat		Final	
Athlete	Event	Time	Rank	Time	Rank
Amani Alobaidli; Saud Ghali; Ahmed Theibich; Noor Yussuf Abdulla	4 × 100 m freestyle relay	3:57.91	18	Did not advance	
Amani Alobaidli; Saud Ghali; Ahmed Theibich; Noor Yussuf Abdulla	4 × 100 m medley relay	4:20.68 NR	29	Did not advance	
