= Bahrain at the 2011 World Aquatics Championships =

- Flag of Bahrain
- FINA code: BRN
- National federation: Bahrain Swimming Association

in Shanghai, China
- Competitors: 3 in 1 sport
- Medals: Gold 0 Silver 0 Bronze 0 Total 0

World Aquatics Championships appearances
- 1973; 1975; 1978; 1982; 1986; 1991; 1994; 1998; 2001; 2003; 2005; 2007; 2009; 2011; 2013; 2015; 2017; 2019; 2022; 2023; 2024

Bahrain competed at the 2011 World Aquatics Championships in Shanghai, China between July 16 and 31, 2011.

== Swimming ==
Bahrain qualified 3 swimmers.

Men

Athlete	Event	Heats		Semifinals		Final	
Athlete	Event	Time	Rank	Time	Rank	Time	Rank
Farhan Farhan	Men's 50m Freestyle	27.70	89	did not advance			
Farhan Farhan	Men's 100m Freestyle	1:01.76	90	did not advance			
Khalid Ismaeel Alibaba	Men's 50m Butterfly	29.95	48	did not advance			
Khalid Ismaeel Alibaba	Men's 100m Butterfly	1:05.40	63	did not advance			

Women

Athlete	Event	Heats		Semifinals		Final	
Athlete	Event	Time	Rank	Time	Rank	Time	Rank
Sara Al Flaij	Women's 50m Freestyle	33.98	76	did not advance			
Sara Al Flaij	Women's 100m Freestyle	1:14.86	75	did not advance			
