= Bahrain at the 2022 World Aquatics Championships =

- Flag of Bahrain
- FINA code: BRN
- National federation: Bahrain Swimming Association

in Budapest, Hungary
- Competitors: 4 in 1 sport
- Medals: Gold 0 Silver 0 Bronze 0 Total 0

World Aquatics Championships appearances
- 1973; 1975; 1978; 1982; 1986; 1991; 1994; 1998; 2001; 2003; 2005; 2007; 2009; 2011; 2013; 2015; 2017; 2019; 2022; 2023; 2024

Bahrain competed at the 2022 World Aquatics Championships in Budapest, Hungary from 17 June to 3 July.

== Swimming ==
Bahrain entered four swimmers.

Men

Athlete	Event	Heat		Semifinal		Final	
Athlete	Event	Time	Rank	Time	Rank	Time	Rank
Omar Al-Rowaila	50 m backstroke	27.28	38	did not advance			
Omar Al-Rowaila	100 m backstroke	1:00.03	40	did not advance			
Saud Ghali	100 m breaststroke	1:06.46	55	did not advance			
Saud Ghali	200 m breaststroke	2:23.68	36	did not advance			

Women

Athlete	Event	Heat		Semifinal		Final	
Athlete	Event	Time	Rank	Time	Rank	Time	Rank
Ayah Binrajab	50 m freestyle	28.81	64	did not advance			
Ayah Binrajab	50 m butterfly	30.69	52	did not advance			
Noor Taha	50 m backstroke	31.38	30	did not advance			
Noor Taha	100 m backstroke	1:09.28	38	did not advance			
