= Bahrain at the 2023 World Aquatics Championships =

- Flag of Bahrain
- FINA code: BHN
- National federation: Bahrain Swimming Association

in Fukuoka, Japan
- Competitors: 4 in 1 sport
- Medals: Gold 0 Silver 0 Bronze 0 Total 0

World Aquatics Championships appearances
- 1973; 1975; 1978; 1982; 1986; 1991; 1994; 1998; 2001; 2003; 2005; 2007; 2009; 2011; 2013; 2015; 2017; 2019; 2022; 2023; 2024

Bahrain is set to compete at the 2023 World Aquatics Championships in Fukuoka, Japan from 14 to 30 July.

== Swimming ==
Bahrain entered 4 swimmers.

Men

Athlete	Event	Heat		Semifinal		Final	
Athlete	Event	Time	Rank	Time	Rank	Time	Rank
Ali Sadeq Alawi	200 metre freestyle	1:59.08	65	Did not advance			
Ali Sadeq Alawi	400 metre freestyle	4:17.02 NR	53	—		Did not advance	
Abdulla Khalid Jamal	50 metre breaststroke	Disqualified		Did not advance			
Abdulla Khalid Jamal	100 metre breaststroke	1:06.07	61	Did not advance			

Women

Athlete	Event	Heat		Semifinal		Final	
Athlete	Event	Time	Rank	Time	Rank	Time	Rank
Ayah Binrajab	50 metre freestyle	28.72	73	Did not advance			
Ayah Binrajab	50 metre butterfly	30.86	53	Did not advance			
Asma Lefalher	100 metre freestyle	1:01.18	52	Did not advance			
Asma Lefalher	200 metre freestyle	2:13.80	59	Did not advance			

Mixed

Athlete	Event	Heat		Final	
Athlete	Event	Time	Rank	Time	Rank
Ali Sadeq Alawi; Abdulla Khalid Jamal; Asma Lefahler; Ayah Binrajab	4 × 100 m freestyle relay	3:54.77	35	Did not advance	
Asma Lefahler; Abdulla Khalid Jamal; Ali Sadeq Alawi; Ayah Binrajab	4 × 100 m medley relay	4:24.40	33	Did not advance	
