= List of Bahraini records in swimming =

The Bahraini records in swimming are the fastest ever performances of swimmers from Bahrain, which are recognised and ratified by Bahrain Aquatics.

All records were set in finals unless noted otherwise.

== Long Course (50 m) ==
=== Men ===
Event	Time		Name	Club	Date	Meet	Location	Ref
50 m freestyle	23.96	h	Farhan Farhan	Bahrain	28 July 2017	World Championships	Budapest, Hungary	
50 m freestyle	22.85	#	Mikhail Arkhangelskiy	Bahrain	12 May 2026	GCC Games	Doha, Qatar	
100 m freestyle	51.87		Farhan Farhan	Bahrain	October 2015	GCC Games	Dammam, Saudi Arabia	
100 m freestyle	49.91	r, #	Mikhail Arkhangelskiy	Bahrain	13 May 2026	GCC Games	Doha, Qatar	
200 m freestyle	1:57.40		Farhan Farhan	Bahrain	October 2015	GCC Games	Dammam, Saudi Arabia	
200 m freestyle	1:53.30	r, #	Robert Bonsall	Bahrain	14 May 2026	GCC Games	Doha, Qatar	
400 m freestyle	4:15.07	b	Ali Alawi	Azura Florida Aquatic	26 July 2025	FG Senior Championships	Pompano Beach, United States	
400 m freestyle	3:57.97	#	Robert Bonsall	Bahrain	13 May 2026	GCC Games	Doha, Qatar	
400 m freestyle	3:57.33	h, #	Robert Bonsall	Bahrain	25 September 2026	Asian Games	Tokyo, Japan	
800 m freestyle	8:50.11		Ali Alawi	Azura Florida Aquatic	9 February 2023	Speedo Sectionals	Orlando, United States	
800 m freestyle	8:14.21	#	Robert Bonsall	Bahrain	12 May 2026	GCC Games	Doha, Qatar	
800 m freestyle	8:13.33	#	Robert Bonsall	Bahrain	24 September 2026	Asian Games	Tokyo, Japan	
1500 m freestyle	17:01.25		Ali Alawi	Azura Florida Aquatic	2 March 2023	FG PST Senior Invite	Plantation, United States	
1500 m freestyle	15:45.05	#	Robert Bonsall	Bahrain	15 May 2026	GCC Games	Doha, Qatar	
1500 m freestyle	15:34.88	#	Robert Bonsall	Bahrain	22 September 2026	Asian Games	Tokyo, Japan	
50 m backstroke	26.81		Omar Al-Rowaila					
50 m backstroke	25.47	#	Mikhail Arkhangelskiy	Bahrain	15 May 2026	GCC Games	Doha, Qatar	
50 m backstroke	25.13	#	Mikhail Arkhangelskiy	Bahrain	30 June 2026	French Championships	Saint-Étienne, France	
50 m backstroke	24.92	#	Stepan Goncharov	Bahrain	21 September 2026	Asian Games	Tokyo, Japan	
100 m backstroke	59.20		Omar Al-Rowaila					
100 m backstroke	55.35	r, #	Mikhail Arkhangelskiy	Bahrain	15 May 2026	GCC Games	Doha, Qatar	
100 m backstroke	55.17	#	Stepan Goncharov	Bahrain	20 September 2026	Asian Games	Tokyo, Japan	
200 m backstroke	2:15.45		Omar Al-Rowaila					
50 m breaststroke	29.12		Miron Boldovskii	Bahrain	30 October 2025	Asian Youth Games	Isa Town, Bahrain	
100 m breaststroke	1:04.88		Saud Ghali	Bahrain	5 July 2023	Pan Arab Games	Oran, Algeria	
200 m breaststroke	2:21.27	h	Saud Ghali	Bahrain	15 February 2024	World Championships	Doha, Qatar	
200 m breaststroke	2:20.61	#	Saud Ghali	Bahrain	15 May 2026	GCC Games	Doha, Qatar	
50 m butterfly	25.91		Ahmed Helal	Bahrain	12 July 2025	GCC Championships	Manama, Bahrain	
50 m butterfly	23.52	#	Mikhail Arkhangelskiy	CN Marseille	27 May 2026	Mare Nostrum	Canet-en-Roussillon, France	
50 m butterfly	22.91	AS, #	Mikhail Arkhangelskiy	CN Marseille	27 June 2026	French Championships	Saint-Étienne, France	
100 m butterfly	58.18	#	Ahmed Helal	Bahrain	31 August 2025	Arab Championships	Casablanca, Morocco	
100 m butterfly	52.72	#	Mikhail Arkhangelskiy	CN Marseille	24 May 2026	Mare Nostrum	Monte Carlo, Monaco	
100 m butterfly	51.41	#	Mikhail Arkhangelskiy	CN Marseille	29 June 2026	French Championships	Saint-Étienne, France	
200 m butterfly	2:12.37		Ahmed Helal	Bahrain	2019	GCC Championships	Kuwait City, Kuwait	
200 m individual medley	2:14.96		Ahmed Suhail					
200 m individual medley	2:09.77	#	Saud Ghali	Bahrain	12 May 2026	GCC Games	Doha, Qatar	
400 m individual medley	4:49.86	#	Ahmed Suhail	Bahrain	29 August 2025	Arab Championships	Casablanca, Morocco	
400 m individual medley	4:27.71	#	Robert Bonsall	Bahrain	14 May 2026	GCC Games	Doha, Qatar	
4×100 m freestyle relay	3:29.62	#	Mikhail Arkhangelskiy (49.91); Robert Bonsall (52.59); Abdulla Jamal (53.73); Ahmed Helal (53.39)	Bahrain	13 May 2026	GCC Games	Doha, Qatar	
4×200 m freestyle relay	7:49.07	#	Robert Bonsall (1:53.30); Mikhail Arkhangelskiy (1:53.94); Ahmed Theibich (2:02.83); Sayed Alawi (1:59.00)	Bahrain	14 May 2026	GCC Games	Doha, Qatar	
4×100 m medley relay	4:02.11	#	Mikhail Arkhangelskiy (55.35); Robert Bonsall (1:09.45); Saud Ghali (1:03.70); Abdulla Jamal (53.61)	Bahrain	15 May 2026	GCC Games	Doha, Qatar	

Legend: # – Record awaiting ratification by Bahrain Swimming Association; WR – World record; AS – Asian record; e – equalled existing record;
Records not set in finals: h – heat; sf – semifinal; r – relay 1st leg; rh – relay heat 1st leg; b – B final; † – en route to final mark; so – swim-off; tt – time trial

=== Women ===
Event	Time		Name	Club	Date	Meet	Location	Ref
50 m freestyle	26.25	h	Amani Alobaidli	Bahrain	15 June 2024	Australian Olympic Trials	Brisbane, Australia	
100 m freestyle	59.38	h	Amani Alobaidli	Bahrain	19 December 2024	Queensland Championships	Brisbane, Australia	
200 m freestyle	2:10.95	#	Sana Le Falher	Bahrain	28 August 2025	Arab Championships	Casablanca, Morocco	
200 m freestyle	2:10.27	h, #	Sana Le Falher	Loughborough University	24 May 2026	AP Race London International	London, Great Britain	
400 m freestyle	4:33.91		Sana Le Falher	Bahrain	31 August 2025	Arab Championships	Casablanca, Morocco	
800 m freestyle	9:27.08		Sana Le Falher	Team Santa Monica	21 July 2024	CA/NV Speedo Sectionals	Fullerton, United States	
1500 m freestyle	17:45.74		Sana Le Falher	Bahrain	12 January 2024	2nd Arab Age Group Championships	Doha, Qatar	
50 m backstroke	29.64		Amani Alobaidli	Bahrain	8 July 2023	Pan Arab Games	Oran, Algeria	
100 m backstroke	1:04.27	h	Amani Alobaidli	Bahrain	29 July 2024	Olympic Games	Paris, France	
200 m backstroke	2:25.16		Amani Alobaidli	Bahrain	7 July 2023	Pan Arab Games	Oran, Algeria	
50 m breaststroke	35.99	h	Dora Buklu	Bahrain	30 October 2025	Asian Youth Games	Isa Town, Bahrain	
100 m breaststroke	1:22.58	h	Dora Buklu	Bahrain	29 October 2025	Asian Youth Games	Isa Town, Bahrain	
200 m breaststroke	2:59.20		Sana Le Falher	Bahrain	19 March 2023	EC International Championship	Dubai, United Arab Emirates	
50 m butterfly	29.12	b	Asma Le Falher	Loughborough University	26 May 2024	AP Race London International	London, United Kingdom	
50 m butterfly	29.05	#	Asma Le Falher	Loughborough University	4 May 2026	East Midland Championships	London, United Kingdom	
100 m butterfly	1:05.53	h	Asma Le Falher	Bahrain	27 July 2025	World Championships	Singapore, Singapore	
200 m butterfly	2:37.34	h	Asma Le Falher	Bahrain	18 March 2023	EC International Championship	Dubai, United Arab Emirates	
200 m individual medley	2:32.26	h	Sana Le Falher	Team Santa Monica	27 July 2024	SCS/GWSC Summer A/G Championships	Huntington Beach, United States	
400 m individual medley	5:20.27		Sana Le Falher	Bahrain	11 January 2024	2nd Arab Age Group Championships	Doha, Qatar	
4×100 m freestyle relay	4:09.77							
4×100 m freestyle relay	4:05.43	h, #	Asma Le Falher (1:00.10); Amani Alobaidli (1:00.23); Noor Taha (1:03.16); Sana Le Falher (1:01.94)	Bahrain	20 September 2026	Asian Games	Tokyo, Japan	
4×200 m freestyle relay	9:20.43							
4×100 m medley relay	4:43.58							

Legend: # – Record awaiting ratification by Bahrain Swimming Association; WR – World record; AS – Asian record; e – equalled existing record;
Records not set in finals: h – heat; sf – semifinal; r – relay 1st leg; rh – relay heat 1st leg; b – B final; † – en route to final mark; so – swim-off; tt – time trial

=== Mixed relay ===
Event	Time		Name	Club	Date	Meet	Location	Ref
4×50 m freestyle relay	1:47.42		Farhan Saleh; Faraj Saleh; Noor Taha; Ayah Adel	-		-		
4×100 m freestyle relay	3:53.79		Sanad Abdulla; Ahmed Suhail; Amani Alobaidli; Asma Le Falher	-		-		
4×50 m medley relay	2:00.70		Noor Taha; Saud Salah; Ayah Adel; Faraj Saleh	-		-		
4×100 m medley relay	4:09.54	h, #	Amani Alobaidli (1:06.85); Abdulla Jamal (1:05.50); Ahmed Helal (57.36); Asma Lefalher (59.83)	Bahrain	23 September 2026	Asian Games	Tokyo, Japan	

Legend: # – Record awaiting ratification by Bahrain Swimming Association; WR – World record; AS – Asian record; e – equalled existing record;
Records not set in finals: h – heat; sf – semifinal; r – relay 1st leg; rh – relay heat 1st leg; b – B final; † – en route to final mark; so – swim-off; tt – time trial

== Short Course (25 m) ==
=== Men ===
Event	Time		Name	Club	Date	Meet	Location	Ref
50 m freestyle	22.96		Farhan Farhan	Bahrain	2016	GCC Championships	Doha, Qatar	
100 m freestyle	50.88		Farhan Farhan	Bahrain	2016	GCC Championships	Doha, Qatar	
200 m freestyle	1:53.90	h	Farhan Farhan	Bahrain	2016	GCC Championships	Doha, Qatar	
400 m freestyle	4:13.00		Ali Alawi					
400 m freestyle	4:07.91	h, #	Soud Ghail	Stipendium Hungaricum	6 November 2025	Hungarian Championships	Debrecen, Hungary	
400 m freestyle	4:06.57	h, #	Soud Ghail	Stipendium Hungaricum	5 November 2026	Hungarian Championships	Kaposvár, Hungary	
800 m freestyle	8:59.10		Ali Alawi					
1500 m freestyle	17:03.86		Ali Alawi					
50 m backstroke	26.09		Omar Al-Rowaila	Bahrain	25 October 2021	Arab Age Group Championships	Abu Dhabi, United Arab Emirates	
100 m backstroke	56.70	h	Omar Al-Rowaila	Bahrain	23 October 2022	World Cup	Berlin, Germany	
200 m backstroke	2:12.43		Ahmed Helal	Bahrain	31 May 2025	St Chris Sharks Winter Championships	Manama, Bahrain	
50 m breaststroke	29.21		Saud Salah					
50 m breaststroke	29.04	#	Abdulla Khaled	Bahrain	5 December 2025	H20 Autumn Championships	Doha, Qatar	
100 m breaststroke	1:02.93		Saud Salah					
100 m breaststroke	1:02.80	h, #	Soud Ghail	Stipendium Hungaricum	5 November 2025	Hungarian Championships	Debrecen, Hungary	
200 m breaststroke	2:16.72		Saud Salah					
200 m breaststroke	2:15.04	b, #	Soud Ghail	Stipendium Hungaricum	7 November 2025	Hungarian Championships	Debrecen, Hungary	
50 m butterfly	25.63		Ahmed Helal	Fusion Aquatics	24 November 2024	Speedo Invitational Meet	Dubai, United Arab Emirates	
100 m butterfly	58.04		Ahmed Helal	-		-		
100 m butterfly	58.03	#	Ahmed Helal	Fusion Aquatics	12 October 2025	Hamilton Aquatics Meet	Dubai, United Arab Emirates	
200 m butterfly	2:12.37		Abdulla Ahmed					
100 m individual medley	59.39	h	Omar Al-Rowaila	Bahrain	21 October 2022	World Cup	Berlin, Germany	
200 m individual medley	2:13.70		Ahmed Helal	-		-		
200 m individual medley	2:09.59	h, #	Soud Ghail	Stipendium Hungaricum	5 November 2025	Hungarian Championships	Debrecen, Hungary	
400 m individual medley	4:40.50		Ahmed Suhail	-	6 December 2024	St Chris Sharks Winter Championships	Manama, Bahrain	
4×50 m freestyle relay								
4×100 m freestyle relay	3:50.01	h	Omar Yousif (54.24); Farhan Farhan (57.93); Faraj Farhan (1:00.24); Khalid Ali Baba (57.60)	Bahrain	12 December 2012	World Championships	Istanbul, Turkey	
4×200 m freestyle relay								
4×50 m medley relay								
4×100 m medley relay	4:13.79	h	Faraj Farhan (1:05.27); Omar Yousif (1:07.97); Khalid Ali Baba (1:02.67); Farhan Farhan (57.88)	Bahrain	16 December 2012	World Championships	Istanbul, Turkey	

Legend: # – Record awaiting ratification by Bahrain Swimming Association; WR – World record; AS – Asian record; e – equalled existing record;
Records not set in finals: h – heat; sf – semifinal; r – relay 1st leg; rh – relay heat 1st leg; b – B final; † – en route to final mark; so – swim-off; tt – time trial

=== Women ===
Event	Time		Name	Club	Date	Meet	Location	Ref
50 m freestyle	26.22		Amani Alobaidli					
100 m freestyle	58.19	h	Asma Le Falher	Bahrain Aquatics	12 December 2025	Scottish Championships	Edinburgh, United Kingdom	
200 m freestyle	2:06.54	h	Sana Le Falher	Repton	16 November 2024	Nova Centurion Open Meet	Nottingham, United Kingdom	
400 m freestyle	4:24.51		Sana Le Falher	Repton	2 November 2024	East Midland Regional Championships	Nottingham, United Kingdom	
800 m freestyle	9:00.25		Sana Le Falher	Repton	3 November 2024	East Midland Regional Championships	Nottingham, United Kingdom	
1500 m freestyle	17:19.60		Sana Le Falher	Repton	1 November 2024	East Midland Regional Championships	Nottingham, United Kingdom	
50 m backstroke	28.76	h	Amani Alobaidli	Bahrain	15 December 2022	World Championships	Melbourne, Australia	
100 m backstroke	1:03.21		Amani Alobaidli					
200 m backstroke	2:23.20		Amani Alobaidli					
50 m breaststroke	37.14		Noor Taha					
50 m breaststroke	35.65	'#'	Dora Buklu	Aqua Universe	27 September 2025	Hamilton Aquatics Super Sprint Meet	Dubai, United Arab Emirates	
100 m breaststroke	1:18.59		Dora Buklu	Aqua Universe	11 October 2025	St Chris Charity Gala	Manama, Bahrain	
200 m breaststroke	2:53.25	h	Sana Le Falher	Bahrain	3 December 2022	St Chris Sharks Winter Championships	Saar, Bahrain	
50 m butterfly	28.72	b	Asma Le Falher	Loughborough University	16 December 2023	Swim Wales Winter Championships	Swansea, United Kingdom	
100 m butterfly	1:04.06		Asma Le Falher	Loughborough University	15 December 2023	Swim Wales Winter Championships	Swansea, United Kingdom	
200 m butterfly	2:29.18		Asma Le Falher	Bahrain	10 December 2022	Hamilton Aquatics Winter Wonders	Dubai, United Arab Emirates	
100 m individual medley	1:09.23		Noor Taha					
200 m individual medley	2:26.70		Sana Le Falher	Sharks	26 November 2023	26th Speedo Invitational	Dubai, United Arab Emirates	
400 m individual medley	5:06.08	h	Sana Le Falher	Repton	2 November 2024	East Midland Regional Championships	Nottingham, United Kingdom	
4×50 m freestyle relay								
4×100 m freestyle relay								
4×200 m freestyle relay								
4×50 m medley relay								
4×100 m medley relay								

Legend: # – Record awaiting ratification by Bahrain Swimming Association; WR – World record; AS – Asian record; e – equalled existing record;
Records not set in finals: h – heat; sf – semifinal; r – relay 1st leg; rh – relay heat 1st leg; b – B final; † – en route to final mark; so – swim-off; tt – time trial
