= Saudi Arabia at the 2023 World Aquatics Championships =

- Flag of Saudi Arabia
- World Aquatics code: KSA
- National federation: Saudi Arabian Swimming Federation

in Fukuoka, Japan
- Competitors: 2 in 1 sport
- Medals: Gold 0 Silver 0 Bronze 0 Total 0

World Aquatics Championships appearances
- 2003; 2005; 2007; 2009; 2011–2017; 2019; 2022; 2023; 2024; 2025

Saudi Arabia competed at the 2023 World Aquatics Championships in Fukuoka, Japan from 14 to 30 July.

== Swimming ==
Saudi Arabia entered two swimmers.

Men

Athlete	Event	Heat		Semifinal		Final	
Athlete	Event	Time	Rank	Time	Rank	Time	Rank
Mohammed Al Zaki	200 metre freestyle	1:58.96	64	Did not advance			
Mohammed Al Zaki	400 metre freestyle	4:20.48	54	—N/a		Did not advance	

Women

Athlete	Event	Heat		Semifinal		Final	
Athlete	Event	Time	Rank	Time	Rank	Time	Rank
Mashael Al-Ayed	50 metre freestyle	30.57	84	Did not advance			
Mashael Al-Ayed	100 metre freestyle	1:07.66	69	Did not advance			
