= Bahrain at the 2017 World Aquatics Championships =

- Flag of Bahrain
- FINA code: BRN
- National federation: Bahrain Swimming Federation

in Budapest, Hungary
- Competitors: 2 in 1 sport
- Medals: Gold 0 Silver 0 Bronze 0 Total 0

World Aquatics Championships appearances
- 1973; 1975; 1978; 1982; 1986; 1991; 1994; 1998; 2001; 2003; 2005; 2007; 2009; 2011; 2013; 2015; 2017; 2019; 2022; 2023; 2024

Bahrain competed at the 2017 World Aquatics Championships in Budapest, Hungary from 14 July to 30 July.

== Swimming ==
Bahrain has received a Universality invitation from FINA to send two swimmers (one man and one woman) to the World Championships.

Athlete	Event	Heat		Semifinal		Final	
Athlete	Event	Time	Rank	Time	Rank	Time	Rank
Farhan Farhan	Men's 50 m freestyle	23.96	78	did not advance			
Farhan Farhan	Men's 100 m freestyle	52.83	73	did not advance			
Ritaj Amin	Women's 50 m freestyle	31.34	77	did not advance			
Ritaj Amin	Women's 50 m butterfly	35.69	58	did not advance			
