= Bahrain at the 2015 World Aquatics Championships =

- Flag of Bahrain
- FINA code: BRN
- National federation: Bahrain Swimming Federation

in Kazan, Russia
- Competitors: 3 in 1 sport
- Medals: Gold 0 Silver 0 Bronze 0 Total 0

World Aquatics Championships appearances
- 1973; 1975; 1978; 1982; 1986; 1991; 1994; 1998; 2001; 2003; 2005; 2007; 2009; 2011; 2013; 2015; 2017; 2019; 2022; 2023; 2024

Bahrain competed at the 2015 World Aquatics Championships in Kazan, Russia from 24 July to 9 August 2015.

== Swimming ==
Bahraini swimmers have achieved qualifying standards in the following events (up to a maximum of 2 swimmers in each event at the A-standard entry time, and 1 at the B-standard):

Men

Athlete	Event	Heat		Semifinal		Final	
Athlete	Event	Time	Rank	Time	Rank	Time	Rank
Faraj Saleh	50 m freestyle	24.98	75	did not advance			
Faraj Saleh	100 m freestyle	55.18	93	did not advance			
Faraj Saleh	50 m backstroke	29.66	59	did not advance			
Faraj Saleh	100 m backstroke	1:04.94	63	did not advance			

Women

Athlete	Event	Heat		Semifinal		Final	
Athlete	Event	Time	Rank	Time	Rank	Time	Rank
Fatema Abdulmohsen	50 m backstroke	40.40	52	did not advance			
Fatema Abdulmohsen	50 m breaststroke	45.91	68	did not advance			
Alzain Tareq	50 m freestyle	35.78	105	did not advance			
Alzain Tareq	50 m butterfly	41.13	64	did not advance			
