= Saudi Arabia at the 2019 World Aquatics Championships =

- Flag of Saudi Arabia
- World Aquatics code: KSA

in Gwangju, South Korea
- Medals: Gold 0 Silver 0 Bronze 0 Total 0

World Aquatics Championships appearances
- 2003; 2005; 2007; 2009; 2011–2017; 2019; 2022; 2023; 2024; 2025

Saudi Arabia competed at the 2019 World Aquatics Championships in Gwangju, South Korea from 12 to 28 July.

== Swimming ==
Saudi Arabia entered one swimmer.

Men

Athlete	Event	Heat		Semifinal		Final	
Athlete	Event	Time	Rank	Time	Rank	Time	Rank
Yousif Bu Arish	50 m butterfly	25.48	64	did not advance			
Yousif Bu Arish	100 m butterfly	56.58	58	did not advance			
