= Bahrain at the 2013 World Aquatics Championships =

- Flag of Bahrain
- FINA code: BRN
- National federation: Bahrain Swimming Federation

in Barcelona, Spain
- Competitors: 3 in 1 sports
- Medals: Gold 0 Silver 0 Bronze 0 Total 0

World Aquatics Championships appearances
- 1973; 1975; 1978; 1982; 1986; 1991; 1994; 1998; 2001; 2003; 2005; 2007; 2009; 2011; 2013; 2015; 2017; 2019; 2022; 2023; 2024

Bahrain is competing at the 2013 World Aquatics Championships in Barcelona, Spain between 19 July and 4 August 2013.

== Swimming ==
Bahraini swimmers achieved qualifying standards in the following events (up to a maximum of 2 swimmers in each event at the A-standard entry time, and 1 at the B-standard):

Men

Athlete	Event	Heat		Semifinal		Final	
Athlete	Event	Time	Rank	Time	Rank	Time	Rank
Khalid Alibaba	400 m freestyle	4:29.94	48	—		did not advance	
Khalid Alibaba	200 m butterfly	2:20.23	33	did not advance			
Farhan Sultan	50 m freestyle	25.39	69	did not advance			
Farhan Sultan	100 m freestyle	55.49	71	did not advance			
Farhan Sultan	100 m backstroke	1:05.67	52	did not advance			

Women

Athlete	Event	Heat		Semifinal		Final	
Athlete	Event	Time	Rank	Time	Rank	Time	Rank
Sameera Al-Bitar	50 m freestyle	29.88	67	did not advance			
Sameera Al-Bitar	100 m freestyle	1:05.32	63	did not advance			
