= Saudi Arabia at the 2024 World Aquatics Championships =

- Flag of Saudi Arabia
- FINA code: KSA
- National federation: Saudi Arabian Swimming Federation

in Doha, Qatar
- Competitors: 3 in 1 sport
- Medals: Gold 0 Silver 0 Bronze 0 Total 0

World Aquatics Championships appearances
- 2003; 2005; 2007; 2009; 2011–2017; 2019; 2022; 2023; 2024

Saudi Arabia competed at the 2024 World Aquatics Championships in Doha, Qatar from 2 to 18 February.

== Competitors ==
The following is the list of competitors in the Championships.

Sport	Men	Women	Total
Swimming	2	1	3
Total	2	1	3

== Swimming ==
Saudi Arabia entered 3 swimmers.

Men

Athlete	Event	Heat		Semifinal		Final	
Athlete	Event	Time	Rank	Time	Rank	Time	Rank
Mohammed Al-Zaki	400 metre freestyle	4:21.18	55	—		Did not advance	
Mohammed Al-Zaki	800 metre freestyle	9:06.29	43	—		Did not advance	
Zaid Al-Sarraj	100 metre freestyle	52.04	58	Did not advance			
Zaid Al-Sarraj	200 metre freestyle	1:57.85	58	Did not advance			

Women

Athlete	Event	Heat		Semifinal		Final	
Athlete	Event	Time	Rank	Time	Rank	Time	Rank
Mashael Meshari A Alayed	200 metre freestyle	2:21.04	48	Did not advance			
Mashael Meshari A Alayed	400 metre freestyle	4:56.42	33	—		Did not advance	
