= Saudi Arabia at the 2022 World Aquatics Championships =

- Flag of Saudi Arabia
- FINA code: KSA

in Budapest, Hungary
- Competitors: 1 in 1 sport
- Medals: Gold 0 Silver 0 Bronze 0 Total 0

World Aquatics Championships appearances
- 2003; 2005; 2007; 2009; 2011–2017; 2019; 2022; 2023; 2024

Saudi Arabia competed at the 2022 World Aquatics Championships in Budapest, Hungary from 17 June to 3 July.

== Swimming ==
Saudi Arabia entered two swimmers.

Men

Athlete	Event	Heat		Semifinal		Final	
Athlete	Event	Time	Rank	Time	Rank	Time	Rank
Ali Al-Essa	50 m backstroke	27.26	37	did not advance			
Ali Al-Essa	200 m backstroke	2:15.66	31	did not advance			

Women

Athlete	Event	Heat		Semifinal		Final	
Athlete	Event	Time	Rank	Time	Rank	Time	Rank
Mashael Al-Ayed	50 m freestyle	DNS		did not advance			
Mashael Al-Ayed	100 m freestyle	DNS		did not advance			
