= Bahrain at the 2019 World Aquatics Championships =

- Flag of Bahrain
- FINA code: BRN
- National federation: Bahrain Swimming Association

in Gwangju, South Korea
- Competitors: 3 in 1 sport
- Medals: Gold 0 Silver 0 Bronze 0 Total 0

World Aquatics Championships appearances
- 1973; 1975; 1978; 1982; 1986; 1991; 1994; 1998; 2001; 2003; 2005; 2007; 2009; 2011; 2013; 2015; 2017; 2019; 2022; 2023; 2024

Bahrain competed at the 2019 World Aquatics Championships in Gwangju, South Korea from 12 to 28 July.

== Swimming ==
Bahrain entered three swimmers.

Men

Athlete	Event	Heat		Semifinal		Final	
Athlete	Event	Time	Rank	Time	Rank	Time	Rank
Abdulla Ahmed	50 m butterfly	26.69	69	did not advance			
Abdulla Ahmed	100 m butterfly	58.44	67	did not advance			
Omar Al-Rowaila	50 m backstroke	28.57	61	did not advance			
Omar Al-Rowaila	100 m backstroke	1:02.96	60	did not advance			

Women

Athlete	Event	Heat		Semifinal		Final	
Athlete	Event	Time	Rank	Time	Rank	Time	Rank
Alaa Binrajab	50 m freestyle	29.55	76	did not advance			
Alaa Binrajab	100 m freestyle	1:07.08	81	did not advance			
