= Taiko Torepe-Ormsby =

New Zealand swimmer

Personal information
- National team: Aquablack #288
- Born: 16 August 2003 (age 23) Christchurch, New Zealand
- Height: 1.88 m (6 ft 2 in)

Sport
- Sport: Swimming
- Strokes: Freestyle & Butterfly
- Classifications: Sprinter
- Club: Wharenui Swim Club
- College team: UW - Madison
- Coach: Cauli Bedran

Taiko Torepe-Ormsby (born 16 August 2003) is a New Zealand swimmer. He competed in the men's 50 metre freestyle event at the 2024 Summer Olympics.

Torepe-Ormsby was the first swimmer from New Zealand to swim the 50-metre freestyle in under 22 seconds. Of Māori descent, he affiliates to Ngāi Tahu and Ngāti Maniapoto.
