= Jose Tati =

Cape Verdean swimmer (born 2007)

Personal information
- Born: August 30, 2007 (age 18) Cape Town, South Africa

Sport
- Sport: Swimming

Jose Tati (born 30 August 2007) is a Cape Verdean swimmer. He competed in the men's 50 metre freestyle event at the 2024 Summer Olympics.
