= Artem Selin =

German swimmer

Personal information
- Born: May 21, 2002 (age 24) Krasnoyarsk, Russia

Sport
- Sport: Swimming
Medal record
Men's swimming
Representing Germany
European Junior Championships
Gold medal – first place	2019 Kazan	50 m freestyle
Gold medal – first place	2019 Kazan	4×100 m freestyle relay

Artem Selin (born 21 May 2002) is a Russian-born German swimmer. He competed in the men's 50-metre freestyle event at the 2024 Summer Olympics.
