= Tobi Sijuade =

Nigerian swimmer

Personal information
- Born: February 23, 2002 (age 24)

Sport
- Sport: Swimming
Medal record
Men's swimming
Representing Nigeria
African Games
Bronze medal – third place	2023 Accra	4×100m freestyle relay

Tobi Sijuade (born 23 February 2002) is a Nigerian swimmer. He competed in the men's 50 metre freestyle event at the 2024 Summer Olympics, but did not advance past the heats.
