= Alzain Tareq =

Bahraini swimmer (born 2005)

Personal information
- Born: April 14, 2005 (age 21)

Sport
- Sport: Swimming

Alzain Tareq (born 14 April 2005) is a swimmer from Bahrain.

== Biography ==
Born in Bahrain in 2005, Tareq is the youngest athlete in history to debut at the world swimming championships, taking part at the 2015 World Aquatics Championships at ten years of age.

Tareq qualified for the World Cup in Kazan with the best time of Bahrain in the 50 butterfly, beating swimmers much older than her. Her participation in the competitions in Kazan was made possible thanks to a legislative vacuum in the FINA rules. FINA does not provide for a minimum age for participation its competitions, but leaves it to the federations of each country to regulate as they see fit (except for diving, for which the minimum age is 14 years). For example, the European Swimming League (LEN), allows participation in its competitions only swimmers who have completed 14 years.

Tareq is the daughter of Tareq Salem Juma, a professional swimmer from Bahrain.
