= Arab Aquatics Championships =

Biennial sport competition

- Status: active
- Genre: sporting event
- Date: mid-year
- Frequency: biennial
- Location: various
- Inaugurated: 2022
- Most recent: Cairo 2022
- Organiser: AAC

The Arab Aquatics Championships (Arabic: البطولة العربية لألعاب الماء) are the Arab championships in the sport of Aquatic. It is organized by the Arab Aquatics Confederation (AAC) and held biennially. The first edition was held in September 2022 in Cairo, Egypt.

== Championships ==
Year	Dates	Edition	Location	Countries	Athletes	Events	Events Details	Winner	Second	Third
2022	7–10 September	1	Cairo, Egypt	18	?	?	? (M), ? (W), ? (Mix.)	Egypt	Algeria	Tunisia
2023										
2024	25–28 August	3	Cairo, Egypt				(M), (W), (Mix.)			
2025	28–1 September	4	Casablanca, Morocco				(M), (W), (Mix.)	Egypt	Morocco	Qatar

== See also ==
- Arab Swimming Championships
