= Zaid Al-Sarraj =

Saudi Arabian swimmer (born 2007)

Personal information
- Full name: Zaid Faisal M Al-Sarraj
- Nationality: Saudi Arabian
- Born: 20 November 2007 (age 18)

Sport
- Sport: Swimming
- Events: 100 metre freestyle 200 metre freestyle

Zaid Faisal M Al-Sarraj (born 20 November 2007) is a Saudi Arabian swimmer. He represented Saudi Arabia at the 2024 World Aquatics Championships in Doha in the 100 and 200 metre freestyles. He also competed in the 100 metre freestyle at the 2024 Summer Olympics in Paris.

== Statistics ==
=== Personal bests ===
Al-Sarraj holds the national record for the 100 and 200 metre freestyles.

Event	Time	Competition	Venue	Date	Records
100 metre freestyle	52.04	World Aquatics Championships	Doha, Qatar	14 February 2024	NR
200 metre freestyle	1:53.89	GCC Youth Games	Abu Dhabi, United Arab Emirates	28 April 2024	NR
