= Noor Yussuf Abdulla =

Bahraini swimmer (born 2005)

Personal information
- Full name: Noor Yussuf Abdulla Taha
- Nationality: Bahraini
- Born: 3 October 2005 (age 20)

Sport
- Sport: Swimming

Noor Yussuf Abdulla Taha (Arabic: نور يوسف عبد الله طه; born 3 October 2005) is a Bahraini swimmer.

She is the national record holder in the 50 metres breaststroke with a time of 36.65 and in the 200 metres breaststroke with a time of 3:08.83.

She competed in the women's 50 metre freestyle at the 2020 Summer Olympics. She was the youngest member of Bahrain's swimming team at the 2020 Summer Olympics. At the Olympics, she set a new personal best. She was one of Bahrain's flag-bearers at the opening ceremony.

She represented her country also at other international championships, including the 2021 FINA World Swimming Championships (25 m), 2022 World Aquatics Championships and 2024 World Aquatics Championships.
