= Yousif Bu Arish =

Saudi Arabian swimmer (born 2000)

Personal information
- Native name: يوسف حبيب بوعريش
- Full name: Yousif Habib Bu Arish
- Nationality: Saudi Arabia
- Born: 25 November 2000 (age 25)

Sport
- Sport: Swimming

Yousif Habib Bu Arish (Arabic: يوسف حبيب بوعريش; born 25 November 2000) is a Kuwaiti-born Saudi Arabian swimmer. He competed in the 2020 Summer Olympics.
