= Farhan Farhan =

Bahraini swimmer (born 1996)

Personal information
- Born: 24 October 1996 (age 29) Riffa, Bahrain
- Height: 179 cm (5 ft 10 in)
- Weight: 67 kg (148 lb)

Sport
- Sport: Swimming
- Strokes: Freestyle

Farhan Farhan (born 24 October 1996) is a Bahraini swimmer. He competed in the men's 50 metre freestyle event at the 2016 Summer Olympics. After placing 58th in the heats, he did not qualify for the semifinals. He was the flag-bearer for Bahrain during the Parade of Nations at the Rio Olympics.
