= Khalid Baba =

Bahraini swimmer

Personal information
- Full name: Khalid Ali Baba
- Born: September 6, 1996 (age 29) Manama, Bahrain
- Height: 5 ft 5 in (1.65 m) (2012)
- Weight: 60 kg (132 lb) (2012)

Sport
- Sport: Swimming
- Coach: Khalid Ahmed

Khalid Ismael Ali Baba (born 6 September 1996) is a Bahraini swimmer.

He appeared in the 2012 Summer Olympics in London, as part of Bahrain's Olympic team. He participated in the men's 100m butterfly event where he recorded a time of 1:04.05, which beat his previous personal best of 1:05.09.
