= Mashael Alayed =

Saudi Arabian swimmer

Personal information
- Native name: مشاعل العايد
- Born: December 18, 2006 (age 19)

Sport
- Sport: Swimming

Mashael Meshari A Alayed (Arabic: مشاعل العايد, born 18 December 2006) is a Saudi swimmer. She was the first woman to represent Saudi Arabia in Olympic swimming, competing at the 2024 Summer Olympics in Paris.

== Career ==
Alayed began swimming in 2022, following policy changes that allowed women to train in swimming. She trains with Ettifaq club in Dammam.

At the 2023 World Aquatics Championships, Alayed competed in the women's 50m and 100m freestyle events.

At the inaugural Gulf Games in April 2024, Alayed won one gold medal and two silver medals. She had previously medalled at the Saudi Arabian Games. At the 2024 World Aquatics Championships, she competed in the women's 200m (finishing with a time of 2:21.04) and 400m freestyle events.

Alayed received an invitation to the 2024 Summer Olympics through a universality place. At the games, Alayed beat her personal best time and came sixth in her heat at the women's 200m freestyle qualifications.

== Personal life ==
Alayed is a graduate of Khobar's French School, and hopes to study engineering.
