= Flag of Bahrain =

Kingdom of Bahrain
- Use: National flag and ensign
- Proportion: 3:5
- Adopted: 14 February 2002; 24 years ago
- Design: A white field on the hoist side separated from a larger red field on the fly by five white triangles in the form of a zigzag pattern

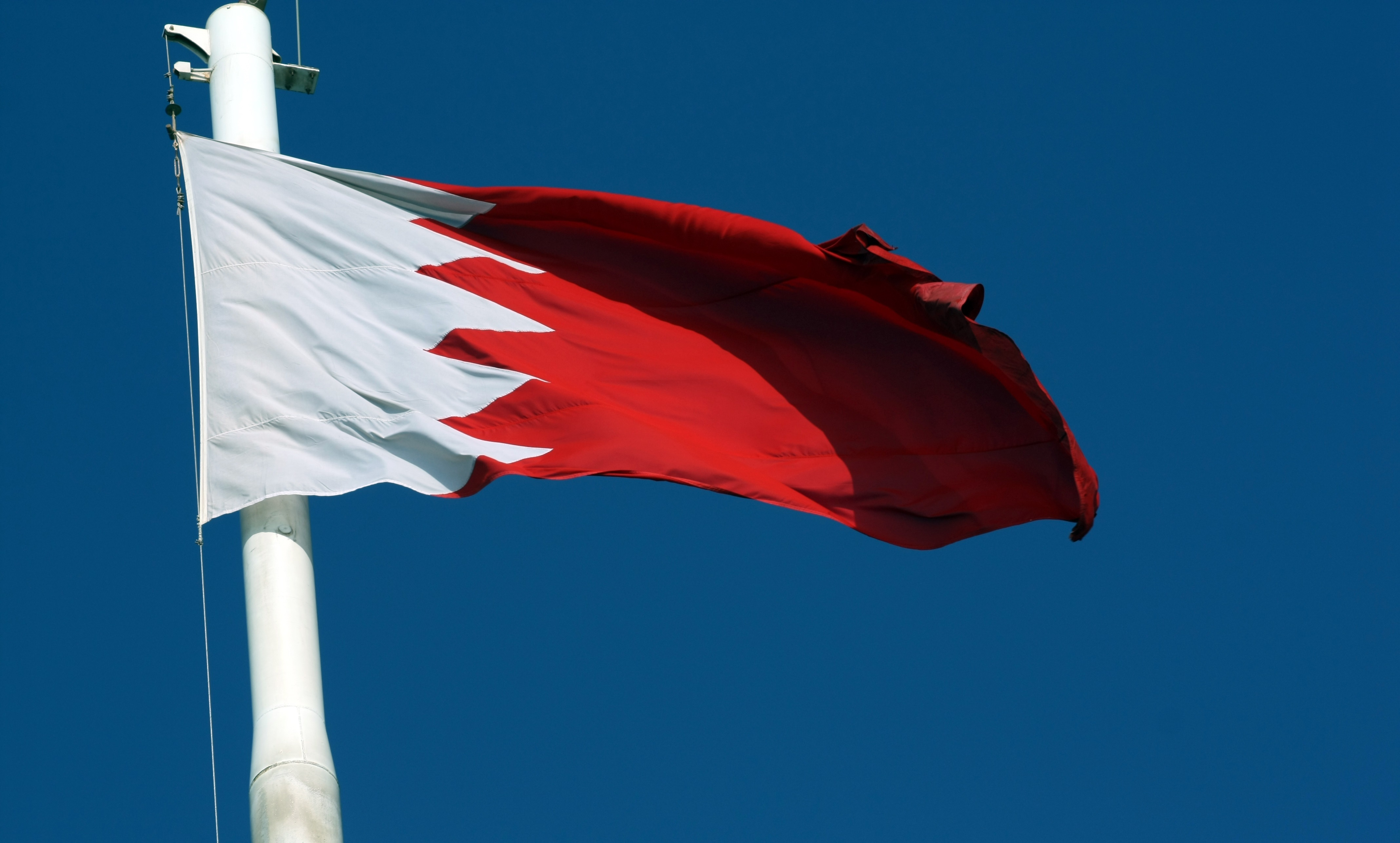
Bahrain flag

The flag of Bahrain (Arabic: عَلَم الْبَحرَيْن) consists of a white band on the left, separated from a red area on the right by five triangles that serve as a serrated line. The five white triangles symbolize the five pillars of Islam, the red on the flag represents the blood of the martyrs and the battles of Bahrain, and the white represents peace. It is sometimes mistaken for the flag of Qatar, but the latter flag is maroon, has nine points and normally has a much greater length-to-width ratio.

White makes up 13/40 (32.5%) of the flag, while red makes up 27/40 (67.5%).

== Design ==
=== Colors ===
Standard colors	White	Red
Pantone	White	485 C
RAL	9016	3028
CMYK	0-0-0-0	0-95-100-0
HEX	#FFFFFF	#DA291C
RGB	255-255-255	218-41-28

=== Construction sheet ===
Flag construction sheet

== Use ==
The flag is used on land and at sea as a national, civil and war ensign. In 2002, the King of Bahrain Hamad bin Isa Al Khalifa, issued Decree by Law No.(4) for 2002, which pertained to the flag:

- Article I: The Flag of the Kingdom of Bahrain shall take a rectangular shape, and shall be divided into two main sections; the first in red, and the other in white color.
- Article II: The King shall have his own flag, for which a royal order shall be issued to determine its shape, measures, and places.
- Article III: The Flag of the Kingdom of Bahrain shall be hoisted on the Royal Court, Palaces, governmental buildings, public establishments, embassies, Bahraini bureaus abroad, and Bahraini ships.
- Article IV: Each non-Bahraini ship entering the territorial waters of the Kingdom of Bahrain shall hoist the Flag of the Kingdom, and shall keep the flag hoisted till it departs from the territorial waters of the Kingdom.
- Article V: The Flag shall be hoisted on governmental buildings, public institutions during public holidays and occasions from sun-rise to sun-set.
- Article VI: The Flag of the Kingdom of Bahrain shall not be hoisted on vehicles, except on the official protocol vehicles.
- Article VII: The Flag of the Kingdom of Bahrain shall be hoisted half mast at the state of mourning.
- Article VIII: The Flag of the Kingdom of Bahrain shall not be used for commercial purposes.
- Article IX: In case the Flag is used otherwise, and not as stipulated in the above law, a punishment of one month of imprisonment as a maximum, or a fine not exceeding than BD 100, or both shall be inflicted.

== Other flags ==
Royal Standard

Flag of the Bahrain Defence Force

Flag of the Bahrain Navy

Flag of the Bahrain Air Force

Flag of the Bahrain Army

Flag of the Royal Guard of Bahrain

Flag of the Bahrain Defence Force Royal Medical Services

Flag of the National Guard of Bahrain

=== Flags of Governorates ===
Capital

Muharraq

Southern

Northern, although its mistakingly written as "Southern Governorate" in Arabic.

==== Former Governorates ====
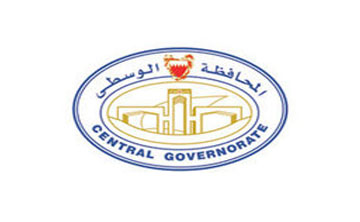
Central

== History ==
The earliest known flags of Bahrain were plain red. In 1820, Bahrain signed a general maritime treaty with the British Empire, and as result, a white stripe was added to the flag to signify the treaty and to distinguish it from the flags commonly used by pirates. In 1932, a serrated edge was added to the flag in order to differentiate it from those of its neighbours.

The flag originally had twenty-eight white points, but this was reduced to eight in 1972. On 14 February 2002, the number was again reduced, to five, so that each of the points could stand for one of the Five Pillars of Islam.

Changing flags of Bahrain
1:3 Flag used from 1783 to 1820.

1:3 Flag used from 1820 to 1932.

Flag used from 1932 to 1972.

3:5 Flag used from 1972 to 2002.

== See also ==
- Flag of Qatar
