= Swimming at the 2025 World Aquatics Championships – Women's 50 metre butterfly =

Women's 50 metre butterfly at the 2025 World Aquatics Championships
- Venue: World Aquatics Championships Arena
- Location: Singapore Sports Hub, Kallang, Singapore
- Dates: 1 August (heats and semifinals); 2 August (final)
- Competitors: 80 from 71 nations
- Winning time: 24.83

Medalists
gold medal	Gretchen Walsh	United States
silver medal	Alexandria Perkins	Australia
bronze medal	Roos Vanotterdijk	Belgium

The women's 50 metre butterfly event at the 2025 World Aquatics Championships was held from 1 to 2 August 2025 at the World Aquatics Championships Arena at the Singapore Sports Hub in Kallang, Singapore.

== Background ==
Sarah Sjöström, who won the previous six world titles in the event, had taken maternity leave. Gretchen Walsh of the United States entered as the fastest active swimmer, having recorded 24.66 earlier in the year, making her the second woman ever to swim under 25 seconds. Her programme in Singapore included the 50 freestyle semifinal and mixed 4×100 freestyle relay on the same day as the 50 butterfly final.

Japan's Rikako Ikee held a 25.41 season best and was seeking her first World Championships medal in this event. Other leading entrants included Australia’s Alexandria Perkins (25.36), the United States’ Kate Douglass (25.39), Germany’s Angelina Köhler (25.55), Sweden’s Sara Junevik (25.50), Greece’s Anna Ntountounaki (25.63), and Belgium’s Roos Vanotterdijk (25.63).

== Qualification ==
Each National Federation was permitted to enter a maximum of two qualified athletes in each individual event, but they could do so only if both of them had attained the "A" standard qualification time. For this event, the "A" standard qualification time was 26.23 seconds. Federations could enter one athlete into the event if they met the "B" standard qualification time. For this event, the "B" standard qualification time was 27.15. Athletes could also enter the event if they had met an "A" or "B" standard in a different event and their Federation had not entered anyone else. Additional considerations applied to Federations who had few swimmers enter through the standard qualification times. Federations in this category could at least enter two men and two women to the competition, all of whom could enter into up to two events.

Top 10 fastest qualification times
Swimmer	Country	Time	Competition
Gretchen Walsh	United States	24.66	2025 United States Championships
Sarah Sjöström	Sweden	24.73	2024 Sette Colli
Mélanie Henique	France	25.22	2024 Eindhoven meet
Rikako Ikee	Japan	25.33	2024 Australian Championships
Alexandria Perkins	Australia	25.36	2025 Australian Trials
Kate Douglass	United States	25.39	Fort Lauderdale stop of the 2025 TYR Pro Swim Series
Zhang Yufei	China	25.42	2024 Summer Olympics
Vanessa Ouwehand	New Zealand	25.43	2025 New Zealand Championships
Sara Junevik	Sweden	25.50	2025 Swedish Championships
Angelina Köhler	Germany	25.55	2025 Sette Colli

== Records ==
Prior to the competition, the existing world and championship records were as follows.

World record	Sarah Sjöström (SWE)	24.43	Borås, Sweden	5 July 2014
Competition record	Sarah Sjöström (SWE)	24.60	Budapest, Hungary	29 July 2017

== Heats ==
The heats took place on 1 August at 11:25.

Rank	Heat	Lane	Swimmer	Nation	Time	Notes
1	9	4	Gretchen Walsh	United States	25.22	Q
2	7	4	Alexandria Perkins	Australia	25.41	Q
3	7	1	Silvia Di Pietro	Italy	25.49	Q, NR
4	7	6	Arina Surkova	Neutral Athletes B	25.56	Q
4	9	5	Kate Douglass	United States	25.56	Q
6	8	5	Sara Junevik	Sweden	25.59	Q
7	8	4	Rikako Ikee	Japan	25.63	Q
7	9	7	Tamara Potocká	Slovakia	25.63	Q, NR
9	9	1	Mizuki Hirai	Japan	25.64	Q
10	9	3	Angelina Köhler	Germany	25.65	Q
10	9	6	Tessa Giele	Netherlands	25.65	Q
12	7	3	Lily Price	Australia	25.77	Q
12	7	5	Erin Gallagher	South Africa	25.77	Q
14	8	6	Roos Vanotterdijk	Belgium	25.79	Q
15	7	0	Taylor Ruck	Canada	25.95	Q
16	7	2	Wang Yichun	China	25.97	Q
17	8	3	Anna Ntountounaki	Greece	26.01	
18	9	8	Louise Hansson	Sweden	26.04	
19	7	7	Daryna Nabojčenko	Czech Republic	26.16	
20	9	2	Wu Qingfeng	China	26.18	
21	8	7	Maaike de Waard	Netherlands	26.20	
22	9	0	Lismar Lyon	Venezuela	26.30	NR
23	8	2	Mariia Osetrova	Neutral Athletes B	26.37	
24	8	0	Iris Julia Berger	Austria	26.39	
24	8	8	Zoe Pedersen	New Zealand	26.39	
26	2	6	Celia Pulido	Mexico	26.40	NR
27	7	9	Arielle Hayon	Israel	26.46	
28	8	1	Beatriz Bezerra	Brazil	26.56	
29	7	8	Laura Quilter	New Zealand	26.60	
30	6	5	Quah Ting Wen	Singapore	26.69	
31	6	4	Elisabeth Ebbesen	Denmark	26.73	
32	8	9	Sofia Spodarenko	Kazakhstan	26.75	
33	9	9	Anastasiya Kuliashova	Neutral Athletes A	26.79	
34	6	0	Lee Lee-na	South Korea	27.01	
35	6	3	Chiu Yi-chen	Chinese Taipei	27.12	
36	6	1	Cielo Moya	Peru	27.16	
37	5	4	Oumy Diop	Senegal	27.19	NR
38	6	7	Yeung Hoi Ching	Hong Kong	27.22	
39	5	3	Emma Sabando Toro	Ecuador	27.28	
40	6	2	Maari Randväli	Estonia	27.32	
41	5	2	Imane Houda El Barodi	Morocco	27.47	NR
42	6	6	Jessica Calderbank	Jamaica	27.50	
43	6	9	Amel Melih	Algeria	27.64	
44	6	8	Marina Spadoni	El Salvador	27.66	
45	5	0	Avigayle Tromp	Aruba	27.86	NR
46	5	7	Imara Bella Patricia Thorpe	Kenya	27.88	
47	1	3	Timipame-Ere Akiayefa	Nigeria	28.21	NR
48	5	6	Adriana Giles	Bolivia	28.23	
49	5	1	Napatsawan Jaritkla	Thailand	28.29	
49	5	9	María Schutzmeier	Nicaragua	28.29	
51	5	5	Paige Schendelaar-Kemp	Samoa	28.60	
52	5	8	Ashley Calderon	Honduras	28.61	
53	4	2	Yeva Karapetyan	Armenia	28.66	
54	4	4	Valerie Tarazi	Palestine	28.72	
55	4	1	Nubia Adjei	Ghana	28.82	
56	4	0	Noelie Annette Lacour	Gabon	28.98	
57	4	5	Kennice Aphenie Greene	Saint Vincent and the Grenadines	29.13	
58	1	5	Antsa Rabejaona	Madagascar	29.31	
59	4	3	Kyra Dalilah De Cuba	Curaçao	29.36	
60	4	8	Victoria Russell	Bahamas	29.41	
61	3	4	Cheang Weng Chi	Macau	29.42	
62	4	7	Naekeisha Louis	Saint Lucia	29.46	
63	3	3	Ionnah Eliane Douillet	Benin	29.48	
64	2	0	Kirabo Namutebi	Uganda	29.55	
65	2	1	Honey Nan	Myanmar	29.67	
66	4	6	Carlota Filipa Silva	Angola	29.78	
67	1	4	Liana Planz	American Samoa	29.99	
68	4	9	Erina Idrizaj	Kosovo	30.08	
69	3	6	Kestra Kihleng	Federated States of Micronesia	30.51	NR
70	3	2	Loane Russet	Vanuatu	30.69	NR
71	3	5	Mashael Meshari A Alayed	Saudi Arabia	30.70	NR
72	3	1	Mayah Chouloute	Haiti	31.33	
73	2	5	Marta Mpfumo	Mozambique	31.75	
74	2	7	Arleigha Hall	Turks and Caicos Islands	32.38	
75	3	7	Adaya Sian Bourne	Sint Maarten	32.73	
76	2	3	Hareem Malik	Pakistan	33.20	
77	3	0	Grace Manuela Nguelo'O	Cameroon	33.51	
78	3	9	Lina Alemayehu Selo	Ethiopia	34.63	
79	2	2	Marie Amenou	Togo	39.85	
80	2	4	Kalisa Keza	Rwanda	40.00	
	2	8	Hazel Alamy	Sierra Leone	Did not start	
	3	8	Tayamika Chang'anamuno	Malawi	Did not start	

== Semifinals ==
The semifinals took place on 1 August at 20:24.

Rank	Heat	Lane	Swimmer	Nation	Time	Notes
1	2	4	Gretchen Walsh	United States	25.09	Q
2	1	1	Roos Vanotterdijk	Belgium	25.32	Q, NR
3	2	1	Erin Gallagher	South Africa	25.39	Q, NR
4	1	4	Alexandria Perkins	Australia	25.52	Q
5	1	5	Arina Surkova	Neutral Athletes B	25.54	Q
6	2	5	Silvia Di Pietro	Italy	25.58	Q
7	1	7	Lily Price	Australia	25.61	Q
8	1	2	Angelina Köhler	Germany	25.62	Q
9	2	2	Mizuki Hirai	Japan	25.63	
10	1	3	Sara Junevik	Sweden	25.65	
11	2	6	Rikako Ikee	Japan	25.67	
12	1	8	Wang Yichun	China	25.68	
13	2	8	Taylor Ruck	Canada	25.71	
14	2	3	Kate Douglass	United States	25.74	
15	1	6	Tamara Potocká	Slovakia	25.86	
15	2	7	Tessa Giele	Netherlands	25.86	

== Final ==
The final took place on 2 August at 19:02.

Rank	Lane	Name	Nationality	Time	Notes
1st place, gold medalist(s)	4	Gretchen Walsh	United States	24.83	
2nd place, silver medalist(s)	6	Alexandria Perkins	Australia	25.31	=OC
3rd place, bronze medalist(s)	5	Roos Vanotterdijk	Belgium	25.43	
4	8	Angelina Köhler	Germany	25.50	NR
5	2	Arina Surkova	Neutral Athletes B	25.59	
6	1	Lily Price	Australia	25.61	
7	7	Silvia Di Pietro	Italy	25.64	
8	3	Erin Gallagher	South Africa	25.66	
