= Kosovo at the 2025 World Aquatics Championships =

- Flag of Kosovo
- World Aquatics code: KOS
- National federation: Kosovo Aquatic Sports Federation

in Singapore
- Competitors: 2 in 1 sport
- Medals: Gold 0 Silver 0 Bronze 0 Total 0

World Aquatics Championships appearances
- 2015; 2017; 2019; 2022; 2023; 2024; 2025

Other related appearances
- Yugoslavia (1973–1991); Serbia and Montenegro (1998–2005); Serbia (2007–2013)

Kosovo is competing at the 2025 World Aquatics Championships in Singapore from 11 July to 3 August 2025.

== Competitors ==
The following is the list of competitors in the Championships.

Sport	Men	Women	Total
Swimming	0	2	2
Total	0	2	2

== Swimming ==
Women

Athlete	Event	Heat		Semifinal		Final	
Athlete	Event	Time	Rank	Time	Rank	Time	Rank
Hana Beiqi	50 m freestyle	26.92	51	Did not advance			
Hana Beiqi	50 m backstroke	30.72	45	Did not advance			
Erina Idrizaj	100 m backstroke	1:09.65	55	Did not advance			
Erina Idrizaj	50 m butterfly	30.08	68	Did not advance			
