= Dominica at the 2025 World Aquatics Championships =

- Flag of Dominica
- World Aquatics code: DMA
- National federation: Dominica Amateur Swimming Association

in Singapore
- Competitors: 1 in 1 sport
- Medals: Gold 0 Silver 0 Bronze 0 Total 0

World Aquatics Championships appearances
- 2023; 2024; 2025

Dominica is competing at the 2025 World Aquatics Championships in Singapore from 11 July to 3 August 2025.

== Competitors ==
The following is the list of competitors in the Championships.

| Sport | Men | Women | Total |
|---|---|---|---|
| Swimming | 0 | 1 | 1 |
| Total | 0 | 1 | 1 |

== Swimming ==
Women

| Athlete | Event | Heat | | Semifinal | | Final | |
| Athlete | Event | Time | Rank | Time | Rank | Time | Rank |
|---|---|---|---|---|---|---|---|
| Jasmine Schofield | 50 m freestyle | 29.37 | 78 | Did not advance | | | |
| Jasmine Schofield | 100 m freestyle | 1:03.90 | 71 | Did not advance | | | |
