= Belize at the 2025 World Aquatics Championships =

- Flag of Belize
- World Aquatics code: BIZ
- National federation: Belize Aquatics Federation

in Singapore
- Competitors: 1 in 1 sport
- Medals: Gold 0 Silver 0 Bronze 0 Total 0

World Aquatics Championships appearances
- 2025

Belize competed at the 2025 World Aquatics Championships in Singapore from 11 July to 3 August 2025. Marking the nation's debut at the long-course World Aquatics Championships, Belize was represented by a single swimmer, 17-year-old Davia Richardson, accompanied by Belize Aquatics Federation President Giovanni Alamilla.

== Competitors ==
The following is the list of competitors in the Championships.

Sport	Men	Women	Total
Swimming	0	1	1
Total	0	1	1

== Swimming ==
Richardson entered two events at the championships. On 27 July, she won her preliminary heat in the women's 100 metre butterfly with a time of 1:04.29, setting a new Belizean national record and placing 47th overall. Four days later on 31 July, she won her heat in the women's 100 metre freestyle in 1:00.74 to finish 57th overall, not advancing to the semifinals in either event.

Women

Athlete	Event	Heat		Semifinal		Final	
Athlete	Event	Time	Rank	Time	Rank	Time	Rank
Davia Richardson	100 m freestyle	1:00.74	57	Did not advance			
Davia Richardson	100 m butterfly	1:04.29 NR	47	Did not advance			
