= Netherlands at the 2025 World Aquatics Championships =

- Flag of the Netherlands
- World Aquatics code: NED
- National federation: Royal Dutch Swimming Federation
- Website: knzb.nl

in Singapore
- Competitors: 31 in 5 sports
- Medals Ranked 17th: Gold 1 Silver 0 Bronze 2 Total 3

World Aquatics Championships appearances
- 1973; 1975; 1978; 1982; 1986; 1991; 1994; 1998; 2001; 2003; 2005; 2007; 2009; 2011; 2013; 2015; 2017; 2019; 2022; 2023; 2024; 2025

The Netherlands is competing at the 2025 World Aquatics Championships in Singapore from 11 July to 3 August 2025.

== Medalists ==
Medal	Name	Sport	Event	Date
1st place, gold medalist(s)	Marrit Steenbergen	Swimming	Women's 100 m freestyle	1 August 2025
3rd place, bronze medalist(s)	Milou van Wijk; Tessa Giele; Sam van Nunen; Marrit Steenbergen; Femke Spiering^{[a]}	Swimming	Women's 4 x 100 m freestyle relay	27 July 2025
3rd place, bronze medalist(s)	Caspar Corbeau	Swimming	Men's 200 m breaststroke	1 August 2025

^{a} Swimmers who participated in the heats only.

== Competitors ==
The following is the list of competitors in the Championships.

Sport	Men	Women	Total
Artistic swimming	0	1	1
Diving	0	1	1
High diving	0	1	1
Swimming	7	6	13
Water polo	0	15	15
Total	7	24	31

== Artistic swimming ==
Women

Athlete	Event	Preliminaries		Final	
Athlete	Event	Points	Rank	Points	Rank
Marloes Steenbeek	Solo technical routine	236.4451	10 Q	238.6417	9
Marloes Steenbeek	Solo free routine	218.5851	8 Q	226.3387	7

== Diving ==
Women

Athlete	Event	Preliminaries		Semifinals		Final	
Athlete	Event	Points	Rank	Points	Rank	Points	Rank
Else Praasterink	10 m platform	279.05	15 Q	266.65	14	Did not advance	

== High diving ==
Athlete	Event	Points	Rank
Ginni van Katwijk	Women's high diving	285.15	6

== Swimming ==
Men

Athlete	Event	Heat		Semifinal		Final	
Athlete	Event	Time	Rank	Time	Rank	Time	Rank
Caspar Corbeau	50 m breaststroke	26.94	10 Q	26.95	12	Did not advance	
Caspar Corbeau	100 m breaststroke	59.03	4 Q	59.17	6 Q	59.06	4
Caspar Corbeau	200 m breaststroke	2:10.31	5 Q	2:08.44	3 Q	2:07.73	3rd place, bronze medalist(s)
Koen de Groot	27.01	12 Q	26.71 NR	4 Q	26.81	7	
Thomas Jansen	200 m individual medley	2:00.04	18	Did not advance			
Thomas Jansen	400 m individual medley	4:14.19	11	—		Did not advance	
Nyls Korstanje	50 m butterfly	22.96	5 Q	22.79	4 Q	22.84	6
Nyls Korstanje	100 m butterfly	51.67	20	Did not advance			
Sean Niewold	50 m freestyle	Did not start					
Sean Niewold	100 m freestyle	Did not start					
Sean Niewold	50 m butterfly	23.21	9 Q	23.17	15	Did not advance	
Renzo Tjon-A-Joe	50 m freestyle	22.06	22	Did not advance			
Kai van Westering	50 m backstroke	25.09	27	Did not advance			
Kai van Westering	100 m backstroke	54.24	24	Did not advance			
Kai van Westering	200 m backstroke	1:59.93	28	Did not advance			
Kai van Westering; Caspar Corbeau; Nyls Korstanje; Sean Niewold	4 × 100 m medley relay	3:31.07 NR	5 Q	—		3:32.35	8

Women

Athlete	Event	Heat		Semifinal		Final	
Athlete	Event	Time	Rank	Time	Rank	Time	Rank
Maaike de Waard	50 m backstroke	27.82	9 Q	27.87	14	Did not advance	
Maaike de Waard	100 m backstroke	1:00.85	19	Did not advance			
Maaike de Waard	50 m butterfly	26.20	21	Did not advance			
Tessa Giele	50 m backstroke	28.12	20	Did not advance			
Tessa Giele	50 m butterfly	25.65	10 Q	25.86	15	Did not advance	
Tessa Giele	100 m butterfly	57.56	10	57.17	9	Did not advance	
Femke Spiering	200 m freestyle	2:01.20	33	Did not advance			
Marrit Steenbergen	50 m freestyle	24.62	8 Q	24.61	12	Did not advance	
Marrit Steenbergen	100 m freestyle	53.53	2 Q	52.81	1 Q	52.55	1st place, gold medalist(s)
Marrit Steenbergen	100 m backstroke	59.86	11 Q	59.94	14	Did not advance	
Milou van Wijk	50 m freestyle	24.39	2 Q	24.29	2 Q	24.47	5
Milou van Wijk	100 m freestyle	54.04	12 Q	53.51	8 Q	52.91	4
Milou van Wijk; Tessa Giele; Sam van Nunen; Marrit Steenbergen; Femke Spiering^{a}	4 × 100 m freestyle relay	3:35.47	3 Q	—		3:33.89	3rd place, bronze medalist(s)

Mixed

Athlete	Event	Heat		Final	
Athlete	Event	Time	Rank	Time	Rank
Renzo Tjon-A-Joe; Sean Niewold; Tessa Giele; Marrit Steenbergen	4 × 100 m freestyle relay	3:24.31	3 Q	3:21.71 NR	5
Kai van Westering; Caspar Corbeau; Tessa Giele; Marrit Steenbergen; Maaike de Waard^{a} Caspar Corbeau^{a} Nyls Korstanje^{a} Milou van Wijk^{a}	4 × 100 m medley relay	3:42.56	2 Q	3:40.97 NR	4

^{a} Swimmers who participated in the heats only.

== Water polo ==
=== Women's tournament ===
Team roster

The following is the Dutch roster.

Head coach: Evangelos Doudesis

- 1 Sarah Buis GK
- 2 Marit van der Weijden FP
- 3 Simone van de Kraats FP
- 4 Sabrina van der Sloot FP
- 5 Maartje Keuning FP
- 6 Fleurien Bosveld FP
- 7 Bente Rogge FP
- 8 Vivian Sevenich FP
- 9 Kitty-Lynn Joustra FP
- 10 Lieke Rogge FP
- 11 Maxine Schaap FP
- 12 Nina ten Broek FP
- 13 Britt van den Dobbelsteen GK
- 14 Noa de Vries FP
- 15 Pien Gorter FP

Group play

Pos	Team	Pld	W	PSW	PSL	L	GF	GA	GD	Pts	Qualification
1	United States	3	3	0	0	0	52	19	+33	9	Quarterfinals
2	Netherlands	3	2	0	0	1	47	24	+23	6	Playoffs
3	China	3	1	0	0	2	43	37	+6	3	Playoffs
4	Argentina	3	0	0	0	3	18	80	−62	0	13–16th place semifinals

Source: Omegatiming
Rules for classification: 1) points; 2) head-to-head points; 3) head-to-head goal difference; 4) head-to-head number of goals scored; 5) Goal difference.

11 July 2025; 10:35	Report	Argentina	6–25	Netherlands	OCBC Aquatic Centre, Singapore; Referees: Maxim Gerasimov (GBR), Georgios Stavridis (GRE)
11 July 2025; 10:35	Report	Score by quarters: 1–6, 2–6, 2–7, 1–6			OCBC Aquatic Centre, Singapore; Referees: Maxim Gerasimov (GBR), Georgios Stavridis (GRE)
11 July 2025; 10:35	Report	Canda, Mastronardi 2	Goals	four players 3	OCBC Aquatic Centre, Singapore; Referees: Maxim Gerasimov (GBR), Georgios Stavridis (GRE)

13 July 2025; 20:45	Report	Netherlands	9–11	United States	OCBC Aquatic Centre, Singapore; Referees: Aurély Blanchard (FRA), Boris Margeta (SLO)
13 July 2025; 20:45	Report	Score by quarters: 2–3, 3–4, 1–2, 3–2			OCBC Aquatic Centre, Singapore; Referees: Aurély Blanchard (FRA), Boris Margeta (SLO)
13 July 2025; 20:45	Report	L. Rogge 3	Goals	Ausmus 3	OCBC Aquatic Centre, Singapore; Referees: Aurély Blanchard (FRA), Boris Margeta (SLO)

15 July 2025; 16:00	Report	China	7–13	Netherlands	OCBC Aquatic Centre, Singapore; Referees: Andrej Franulović (CRO), Yasser Mehalhel (EGY)
15 July 2025; 16:00	Report	Score by quarters: 2–3, 1–2, 2–4, 2–4			OCBC Aquatic Centre, Singapore; Referees: Andrej Franulović (CRO), Yasser Mehalhel (EGY)
15 July 2025; 16:00	Report	Yan S. 3	Goals	Van der Sloot 4	OCBC Aquatic Centre, Singapore; Referees: Andrej Franulović (CRO), Yasser Mehalhel (EGY)

Playoffs

17 July 2025; 17:35	Report	New Zealand	9–14	Netherlands	OCBC Aquatic Centre, Singapore; Referees: Wu Zhekang (SGP), Germán Moller (ARG)
17 July 2025; 17:35	Report	Score by quarters: 1–3, 2–5, 4–5, 2–1			OCBC Aquatic Centre, Singapore; Referees: Wu Zhekang (SGP), Germán Moller (ARG)
17 July 2025; 17:35	Report	Quin 3	Goals	Van de Kraats 5	OCBC Aquatic Centre, Singapore; Referees: Wu Zhekang (SGP), Germán Moller (ARG)

Quarterfinals

19 July 2025; 20:45	Report	Spain	15–13	Netherlands	OCBC Aquatic Centre, Singapore; Referees: Frank Ohme (GER), Georgios Stavridis (GRE)
19 July 2025; 20:45	Report	Score by quarters: 3–1, 4–2, 3–5, 1–3 PSO: 4–2			OCBC Aquatic Centre, Singapore; Referees: Frank Ohme (GER), Georgios Stavridis (GRE)
19 July 2025; 20:45	Report	Ortiz 3	Goals	L. Rogge 6	OCBC Aquatic Centre, Singapore; Referees: Frank Ohme (GER), Georgios Stavridis (GRE)

5–8th place semifinals

21 July 2025; 20:00	Report	Italy	13–16	Netherlands	OCBC Aquatic Centre, Singapore; Referees: Tamás Kovács-Csatlós (HUN), Marta Cabanas (ESP)
21 July 2025; 20:00	Report	Score by quarters: 2–6, 4–2, 3–5, 4–3			OCBC Aquatic Centre, Singapore; Referees: Tamás Kovács-Csatlós (HUN), Marta Cabanas (ESP)
21 July 2025; 20:00	Report	Cocchiere 3	Goals	Keuning, L. Rogge 3	OCBC Aquatic Centre, Singapore; Referees: Tamás Kovács-Csatlós (HUN), Marta Cabanas (ESP)

Fifth place game

23 July 2025; 17:35	Report	Australia	11–13	Netherlands	OCBC Aquatic Centre, Singapore; Referees: Ivan Raković (SRB), Jennifer McCall (USA)
23 July 2025; 17:35	Report	Score by quarters: 2–2, 2–3, 4–4, 3–4			OCBC Aquatic Centre, Singapore; Referees: Ivan Raković (SRB), Jennifer McCall (USA)
23 July 2025; 17:35	Report	Williams 3	Goals	Bosveld 3	OCBC Aquatic Centre, Singapore; Referees: Ivan Raković (SRB), Jennifer McCall (USA)
