= Swimming at the 2025 World Aquatics Championships – Men's 50 metre breaststroke =

Men's 50 metre breaststroke at the 2025 World Aquatics Championships
- Venue: World Aquatics Championships Arena
- Location: Singapore Sports Hub, Kallang
- Dates: 29 July (heats and semifinals); 30 July (final)
- Competitors: 83 from 72 nations
- Winning time: 26.54

Medalists
gold medal	Simone Cerasuolo	Italy
silver medal	Kirill Prigoda
bronze medal	Qin Haiyang	China

The men's 50 metre breaststroke event at the 2025 World Aquatics Championships was held from 29 to 30 July 2025 at the World Aquatics Championships Arena at the Singapore Sports Hub in Kallang, Singapore.

== Background ==
Several major swimmers were missing in this event, including world record holder Adam Peaty, three-time World Championship medalist Nic Fink, and Doha 2024 champion Sam Williamson. World junior record holder Shin Ohashi of Japan and the fastest swimmer of 2025, Ludovico Viberti of Italy, were also absent. China’s Qin Haiyang, the 2023 world champion and second-fastest performer in history, was returning to the long-course international stage after not winning an individual medal at the 2024 Olympics. Belarusian Ilya Shymanovich, competing for the Neutral Athletes A team, had been consistently fast in 2025. Italy’s Simone Cerasuolo and Nicolò Martinenghi both ranked among the event’s historical top performers. Other notable entrants included Russia’s Ivan Kozhakin and Kirill Prigoda, who were both representing the Neutral Athletes B team; Campbell McKean of the United States; and Luka Mladenovic of Austria.

== Qualification ==
Each National Federation was permitted to enter a maximum of two qualified athletes in each individual event, but they could do so only if both of them had attained the "A" standard qualification time. For this event, the "A" standard qualification time was 27.33 seconds. Federations could enter one athlete into the event if they met the "B" standard qualification time. For this event, the "B" standard qualification time was 28.29 seconds. Athletes could also enter the event if they had met an "A" or "B" standard in a different event and their Federation had not entered anyone else. Additional considerations applied to Federations who had few swimmers enter through the standard qualification times. Federations in this category could at least enter two men and two women to the competition, all of whom could enter into up to two events.

Top 10 fastest qualification times
Swimmer	Country	Time	Competition
Ludovico Viberti	Italy	26.27	2025 Sette Colli Trophy
Ilya Shymanovich	Individual Neutral Athletes	26.37	2025 Dubai International Championships
Ivan Kozhakin	Individual Neutral Athletes	26.46	2025 Russian Championships
Simone Cerasuolo	Italy	26.53	2024 Campionato Italiano Assoluto
Qin Haiyang	China	26.54	2025 Chinese Championships
Nicolo Martinenghi	Italy	26.56	2024 Sette Colli Trophy
Melvin Imoudu	Germany	26.62	2024 German Championships
Sam Williamson	Australia	26.66	2025 Mattioli Victorian Open
Kirill Prigoda	Individual Neutral Athletes	26.70	2025 Russian Championships
Luka Mladenovic	Austria	26.72	2025 European U-23 Championships

== Records ==
Prior to the competition, the existing world and championship records were as follows.

World record	Adam Peaty (GBR)	25.95	Budapest, Hungary	25 July 2017
Competition record	Adam Peaty (GBR)	25.95	Budapest, Hungary	25 July 2017

== Heats ==
The heats took place on 29 July at 10:02.

Rank	Heat	Lane	Swimmer	Nation	Time	Notes
1	7	4	Simone Cerasuolo	Italy	26.42	Q
2	8	8	Taku Taniguchi	Japan	26.65	Q, NR
3	8	5	Melvin Imoudu	Germany	26.74	Q
4	7	5	Kirill Prigoda	Neutral Athletes B	26.76	Q
5	8	4	Ivan Kozhakin	Neutral Athletes B	26.77	Q
6	9	6	Chris Smith	South Africa	26.82	Q
7	8	1	Ronan Wantenaar	Namibia	26.85	Q, NR
8	9	4	Ilya Shymanovich	Neutral Athletes A	26.89	Q
9	9	5	Nicolò Martinenghi	Italy	26.90	Q
10	9	7	Caspar Corbeau	Netherlands	26.94	Q
11	9	3	Qin Haiyang	China	26.98	Q
12	7	3	Koen de Groot	Netherlands	27.01	Q
13	6	0	Choi Dong-yeol	South Korea	27.13	Q
14	7	6	Emre Sakçı	Turkey	27.18	Q
14	8	7	Antoine Viquerat	France	27.18	Q
16	8	3	Luka Mladenovic	Austria	27.20	Q
17	7	0	Volodymyr Lisovets	Ukraine	27.22	
18	7	8	Toshinari Yanagisawa	Japan	27.23	
19	8	0	Lucas Matzerath	Germany	27.25	
20	9	0	Nusrat Allahverdi	Turkey	27.26	
21	9	9	Andrés Puente	Mexico	27.27	
22	7	7	Kristian Pitshugin	Israel	27.30	
23	8	2	Denis Petrashov	Kyrgyzstan	27.31	
24	8	6	Campbell McKean	United States	27.32	
25	9	2	Michael Andrew	United States	27.37	
26	8	9	Stepan Babenko	Ukraine	27.39	
27	6	4	Jørgen Scheie Bråthen	Norway	27.48	
28	7	9	Jonas Gaur	Denmark	27.49	
29	6	6	Jan Kałusowski	Poland	27.50	
29	6	9	Max Morgan	Great Britain	27.50	
31	9	1	Bernhard Reitshammer	Austria	27.53	
32	5	2	Oliver Dawson	Canada	27.55	
32	7	2	Sun Jiajun	China	27.55	
34	7	1	Mikel Schreuders	Aruba	27.59	
35	6	1	Daniel Kertes	Sweden	27.73	
36	6	3	Aleksas Savickas	Lithuania	27.74	
37	5	6	Jorge Murillo	Colombia	27.77	
38	5	7	Samy Boutouil	Morocco	27.78	NR
39	6	5	Felix Viktor Iberle	Indonesia	27.81	
40	5	0	Einar Margeir Ágústsson	Iceland	27.89	
41	6	2	Nil Cadevall	Spain	27.90	
42	6	7	Arsen Kozhakhmetov	Kazakhstan	27.97	
43	5	9	Josué Domínguez	Dominican Republic	28.07	
44	4	2	Gian-Luca Gartmann	Switzerland	28.10	
45	5	4	Chan Chun Ho	Singapore	28.16	
46	5	3	Tsui Yik Ki	Hong Kong	28.19	
47	5	5	Andrew Goh	Malaysia	28.21	
48	4	6	Chao Man Hou	Macau	28.23	
49	5	1	Kito Campbell	Jamaica	28.28	
50	4	3	Likhith Selvaraj Prema	India	28.45	
51	3	2	Alexandre Grand'Pierre	Haiti	28.52	
52	3	6	Samuel Yalimaiwai	Fiji	28.54	NR
53	4	1	Joao Carneiro	Luxembourg	28.57	
54	4	7	Panayiotis Panaretos	Cyprus	28.61	
55	3	5	Samyar Abdoli	Iran	28.69	
56	4	4	Adrian Robinson	Botswana	28.70	
57	4	5	Denis Svet	Moldova	28.73	
58	4	8	Matthew Lawrence	Mozambique	28.82	
59	3	4	Zach Moyo	Zambia	29.04	NR
60	3	7	Ashot Chakhoyan	Armenia	29.12	=NR
61	4	0	Jonathan Raharvel	Madagascar	29.25	
62	3	3	Abobakr Abass	Sudan	29.34	
63	3	0	Haniel Kudwoli	Kenya	29.65	
64	3	1	Jayden Loran	Curaçao	29.78	
65	4	9	Mark Anthony Thompson	Bahamas	29.88	
66	2	1	Mohammed Al-Khalidi	Iraq	30.16	
67	3	8	Jesus Cabrera	Bolivia	30.35	
68	2	0	Eyad Masoud	Athlete Refugee Team	30.54	
69	3	9	Anas Ganedi	Libya	31.14	NR
70	1	2	Kouki Watanabe	Northern Mariana Islands	31.36	
71	2	5	Fahim Anwari	Afghanistan	31.40	
72	2	4	Chadd Ning	Eswatini	31.62	
73	2	3	Fodé Camara	Guinea	32.25	
74	2	8	Nathaniel Noka	Papua New Guinea	33.47	
75	2	6	Ethan Gardiner	Turks and Caicos Islands	33.63	
76	1	5	Leo Nzimbi	Central African Republic	33.79	
77	1	6	Jehu Matondo Bosange Zozo	Democratic Republic of the Congo	39.29	
78	1	4	Temkin Getachew Mohamed	Ethiopia	39.42	
79	2	2	Jonathan Irizarry	Anguilla	45.70	
	1	3	Beula Sanga	Solomon Islands	Disqualified	
	5	8	Mohamed Mahmoud	Qatar	Disqualified	
	6	8	Nash Wilkes	Australia	Disqualified	
	9	8	Pierre Goudeneche	France	Disqualified	
	2	7	Foday Mansaray	Sierra Leone	Did not start	
	2	9	Fabio Barros dos Santos	São Tomé and Príncipe	Did not start	

== Semifinals ==
The semifinals took place on 29 July at 19:36.

Rank	Heat	Lane	Swimmer	Nation	Time	Notes
1	2	7	Qin Haiyang	China	26.52	Q
2	2	4	Simone Cerasuolo	Italy	26.64	Q
3	2	3	Ivan Kozhakin	Neutral Athletes B	26.66	Q
4	1	7	Koen de Groot	Netherlands	26.71	Q, NR
5	1	3	Chris Smith	South Africa	26.77	Q
5	2	5	Melvin Imoudu	Germany	26.77	Q
7	1	5	Kirill Prigoda	Neutral Athletes B	26.92	Q
8	1	8	Luka Mladenovic	Austria	26.93	SO
8	2	8	Antoine Viquerat	France	26.93	SO, NR
10	1	6	Ilya Shymanovich	Neutral Athletes A	26.94	
10	2	6	Ronan Wantenaar	Namibia	26.94	
12	1	2	Caspar Corbeau	Netherlands	26.95	
13	2	2	Nicolò Martinenghi	Italy	27.03	
14	1	1	Emre Sakçı	Turkey	27.04	
15	2	1	Choi Dong-yeol	South Korea	27.05	
16	1	4	Taku Taniguchi	Japan	27.07	

=== Swim-off ===
The swim-off was started on 29 July at 20:57.

Rank	Lane	Name	Nationality	Time	Notes
1	4	Luka Mladenovic	Austria	26.97	Q
2	5	Antoine Viquerat	France	27.27	

== Final ==
The final took place on 30 July at 20:03.

Rank	Lane	Name	Nationality	Time	Notes
1st place, gold medalist(s)	5	Simone Cerasuolo	Italy	26.54	
2nd place, silver medalist(s)	1	Kirill Prigoda	Neutral Athletes B	26.62	
3rd place, bronze medalist(s)	4	Qin Haiyang	China	26.67	
4	3	Ivan Kozhakin	Neutral Athletes B	26.73	
5	7	Melvin Imoudu	Germany	26.74	
6	2	Chris Smith	South Africa	26.75	
7	6	Koen de Groot	Netherlands	26.81	
8	8	Luka Mladenovic	Austria	26.89	
