= Swimming at the 2025 World Aquatics Championships – Women's 100 metre freestyle =

Women's 100 metre freestyle at the 2025 World Aquatics Championships
- Venue: World Aquatics Championships Arena
- Location: Singapore Sports Hub, Kallang
- Dates: 31 July (heats and semifinals); 1 August (final)
- Competitors: 82 from 74 nations
- Winning time: 52.55

Medalists
gold medal	Marrit Steenbergen	Netherlands
silver medal	Mollie O'Callaghan	Australia
bronze medal	Torri Huske	United States

The women's 100 metre freestyle event at the 2025 World Aquatics Championships was held from 31 July to 1 August at the World Aquatics Championships Arena at the Singapore Sports Hub in Kallang, Singapore.

== Background ==
Only two athletes from the 2023 World Championships final were returning, leaving opportunities for emerging competitors. 2024 Olympic gold and bronze medalists Sarah Sjöström of Sweden and Siobhán Haughey of Hong Kong were also absent. Australia’s Mollie O’Callaghan entered as the top seed with a time of 52.24, though she had a heavy schedule and recent knee injury. The United States’ Torri Huske, second seed with 52.29, held the world's fastest 2025 time (52.43) and had shown consistent time drops at major meets. Gretchen Walsh, also from the United States, had posted 52.78 in 2025. Defending World Champion Marrit Steenbergen of the Netherlands, seeded at 52.72, and teammate Milou van Wijk were also expected to contest strongly. China’s Wu Qingfeng and Cheng Yujie, alongside Italy’s Sara Curtis and Australian Olivia Wunsch are additional podium contenders.

== Qualification ==
Each National Federation was permitted to enter a maximum of two qualified athletes in each individual event, but they could do so only if both of them had attained the "A" standard qualification time in an approved qualification event. For this event, the "A" standard qualification time was 54.25 seconds. Federations could enter one athlete into the event if they met the "B" standard qualification time. For this event, the "B" standard qualification time was 56.15 seconds. Athletes could also enter the event if they had met an "A" or "B" standard in a different event and their Federation had not entered anyone else. Additional considerations applied to Federations who had few swimmers enter through the standard qualification times. Federations in this category could at least enter two men and two women to the competition, all of whom could enter into up to two events.

Top 10 fastest qualification times
Swimmer	Country	Time	Competition
Sarah Sjöström	Sweden	52.16	2024 Summer Olympics
Mollie O'Callaghan	Australia	52.24	2024 Summer Olympics
Torri Huske	United States	52.29	2024 Summer Olympics
Siobhán Haughey	Hong Kong	52.33	2024 Summer Olympics
Yang Junxuan	China	52.48	2024 Summer Olympics
Meg Harris	Australia	52.52	2024 Australian Olympic Trials
Kate Douglass	United States	52.56	2024 United States Olympic Trials
Shayna Jack	Australia	52.65	2024 Australian Olympic Trials
Marrit Steenbergen	Netherlands	52.72	2024 Eindhoven meet
Gretchen Walsh	United States	52.78	2025 United States Championships

== Records ==
Prior to the competition, the existing world and championship records were as follows.

World record	Sarah Sjöström (SWE)	51.71	Budapest, Hungary	23 July 2017
Competition record	Sarah Sjöström (SWE)	51.71	Budapest, Hungary	23 July 2017

== Heats ==
The heats took place on 31 July 2025 at 10:02.

Rank	Heat	Lane	Swimmer	Nation	Time	Notes
1	9	4	Mollie O'Callaghan	Australia	53.40	Q
2	7	4	Marrit Steenbergen	Netherlands	53.53	Q
2	8	5	Sara Curtis	Italy	53.53	Q
4	9	6	Daria Klepikova	Neutral Athletes B	53.55	Q
5	7	6	Béryl Gastaldello	France	53.56	Q
6	9	1	Florine Gaspard	Belgium	53.71	Q
7	7	5	Olivia Wunsch	Australia	53.74	WD
8	8	3	Cheng Yujie	China	53.90	Q
9	8	6	Barbora Seemanová	Czech Republic	53.94	Q
10	9	2	Roos Vanotterdijk	Belgium	53.98	Q
11	8	4	Torri Huske	United States	53.99	Q
12	7	3	Milou van Wijk	Netherlands	54.04	Q
13	8	2	Daria Trofimova	Neutral Athletes B	54.14	Q
14	9	3	Wu Qingfeng	China	54.15	Q
15	9	7	Nina Holt	Germany	54.26	Q
16	7	1	Barbora Janíčková	Czech Republic	54.38	Q
17	8	7	Freya Anderson	Great Britain	54.39	R
18	8	1	Emma Virginia Menicucci	Italy	54.45	
18	8	8	Taylor Ruck	Canada	54.45	
20	7	8	Sofia Åstedt	Sweden	54.47	
21	7	7	Eva Okaro	Great Britain	54.55	
21	9	0	Maria Daza Garcia	Spain	54.55	
23	7	2	Stephanie Balduccini	Brazil	54.57	
24	8	9	Iris Julia Berger	Austria	54.73	
25	9	8	Nagisa Ikemoto	Japan	54.90	
26	7	0	Elisabeth Ebbesen	Denmark	54.96	
27	6	4	Erin Gallagher	South Africa	55.01	
28	6	5	Milana Tapper	New Zealand	55.23	
29	9	9	Snæfríður Jórunnardóttir	Iceland	55.31	
30	6	9	Lillian Slušná	Slovakia	55.48	
31	6	2	Hur Yeon-kyung	South Korea	55.58	
31	7	9	Li Sum Yiu	Hong Kong	55.58	
33	6	3	Janja Šegel	Slovenia	55.71	
34	6	7	Gloria Muzito	Uganda	56.04	
35	6	1	Lea Polonsky	Israel	56.10	
36	6	8	Quah Ting Wen	Singapore	56.44	
37	6	6	Danielle Hill	Ireland	56.59	
38	5	4	Andrea Becali	Cuba	57.05	
38	6	0	Isabella Dieffenthaller	Trinidad and Tobago	57.05	
40	5	9	Sara Mose	Kenya	57.46	
41	5	6	Tilly Collymore	Grenada	57.64	NR
42	5	3	Paige van der Westhuizen	Zimbabwe	57.70	
43	5	5	Anahira McCutcheon	Fiji	57.76	
44	5	7	Mia Millar	Thailand	57.81	
45	5	2	Elisabeth Timmer	Aruba	58.01	
46	4	5	Joselle Mensah	Ghana	58.98	NR
47	5	1	Zaylie-Elizabeth Thompson	Bahamas	59.45	
48	4	4	Riley Miller	Virgin Islands	59.55	
49	2	8	Hiruki de Silva	Sri Lanka	59.83	
50	4	0	Emilia Sandoval	Guatemala	59.88	
51	2	0	Mia Laban	Cook Islands	59.95	
52	5	8	Aunjelique Liddie	Antigua and Barbuda	59.98	
53	4	6	María Fernández	Dominican Republic	1:00.06	
54	5	0	Mikaili Charlemagne	Saint Lucia	1:00.22	
55	4	7	Jovana Kuljača	Montenegro	1:00.49	
56	4	2	Asma Lefalher	Bahrain	1:00.53	
57	3	3	Davia Richardson	Belize	1:00.74	
58	4	3	Estela Duran	Bolivia	1:00.78	
59	2	3	Adaku Nwandu	Nigeria	1:00.89	
60	2	2	Yeva Karapetyan	Armenia	1:01.21	
61	2	7	Aiymkyz Aidaralieva	Kyrgyzstan	1:01.45	
62	4	8	Jhnayali Tokome-Garap	Papua New Guinea	1:01.54	
63	1	3	Osiyokhon Redjapova	Uzbekistan	1:01.66	
64	4	1	Aleka Persaud	Guyana	1:02.03	
65	3	6	Sharmeen Mohd Mharvin	Brunei	1:02.46	
66	3	4	Anastasiya Morginshtern	Turkmenistan	1:02.62	
67	1	4	Jana Al-Tawil	Jordan	1:02.79	
68	3	0	Loane Russet	Vanuatu	1:03.13	NR
69	3	7	Kestra Kihleng	Federated States of Micronesia	1:03.30	NR
70	3	1	Siwakhile Dlamini	Eswatini	1:03.87	
71	3	5	Jasmine Schofield	Dominica	1:03.90	
72	1	6	Amna Thazkiyah Mirsaad	Maldives	1:04.04	
73	3	2	Mashael Al-Ayed	Saudi Arabia	1:04.98	
74	4	9	Charissa Panuve	Tonga	1:05.30	
75	1	5	Aarya Maharjan	Nepal	1:05.43	
76	3	9	Amazya Macrooy	Suriname	1:07.92	
77	2	9	Mst Any Akter	Bangladesh	1:08.42	
78	2	5	Aragsan Mugabo	Rwanda	1:09.21	
79	2	4	Iman Kouraogo	Burkina Faso	1:09.56	
80	3	8	Tayamika Chang'anamuno	Malawi	1:11.09	
81	2	1	Ceylia Djeutcha	Cameroon	1:12.34	
82	2	6	Djenabou Jolie Bah	Guinea	1:13.41	
	8	0	Katarzyna Wasick	Poland	Did not start	
	9	5	Gretchen Walsh	United States	Did not start	

== Semifinals ==
The semifinals took place on 31 July at 19:11.

Rank	Heat	Lane	Swimmer	Nation	Time	Notes
1	1	4	Marrit Steenbergen	Netherlands	52.81	Q
2	2	4	Mollie O'Callaghan	Australia	52.82	Q
3	1	5	Daria Klepikova	Neutral Athletes B	53.14	Q, NR (Note: National record for Russia, through she was representing the Neutral Athletes B team.)
4	1	2	Torri Huske	United States	53.21	Q
5	2	6	Cheng Yujie	China	53.34	Q
6	2	3	Béryl Gastaldello	France	53.36	Q
7	2	5	Sara Curtis	Italy	53.39	Q
8	2	7	Milou van Wijk	Netherlands	53.51	Q
9	2	8	Barbora Janíčková	Czech Republic	53.60	
10	1	6	Barbora Seemanová	Czech Republic	53.72	
11	1	3	Florine Gaspard	Belgium	53.87	
11	2	2	Roos Vanotterdijk	Belgium	53.87	
13	1	7	Daria Trofimova	Neutral Athletes B	54.21	
14	1	1	Nina Holt	Germany	54.31	
15	2	1	Wu Qingfeng	China	54.32	
16	1	8	Freya Anderson	Great Britain	54.49	

== Final ==
The final took place on 1 August at 19:02.

Rank	Lane	Name	Nationality	Time	Notes
1st place, gold medalist(s)	4	Marrit Steenbergen	Netherlands	52.55	
2nd place, silver medalist(s)	5	Mollie O'Callaghan	Australia	52.67	
3rd place, bronze medalist(s)	6	Torri Huske	United States	52.89	
4	8	Milou van Wijk	Netherlands	52.91	
5	3	Daria Klepikova	Neutral Athletes B	52.98	NR
6	7	Béryl Gastaldello	France	53.30	
7	2	Cheng Yujie	China	53.34	
8	1	Sara Curtis	Italy	53.41	
