= Myanmar at the 2025 World Aquatics Championships =

- Flag of Myanmar
- World Aquatics code: MYA
- National federation: Myanmar Swimming Federation

in Singapore
- Competitors: 3 in 1 sport
- Medals: Gold 0 Silver 0 Bronze 0 Total 0

World Aquatics Championships appearances
- 2001; 2003; 2005; 2007; 2009; 2011; 2013; 2015; 2017–2023; 2024; 2025

Myanmar is competing at the 2025 World Aquatics Championships in Singapore from 11 July to 3 August 2025.

== Competitors ==
The following is the list of competitors in the Championships.

Sport	Men	Women	Total
Swimming	2	1	3
Total	2	1	3

== Swimming ==
Men

Athlete	Event	Heat		Semifinal		Final	
Athlete	Event	Time	Rank	Time	Rank	Time	Rank
Phone Pyae Han	100 m freestyle	54.43	84	Did not advance			
Phone Pyae Han	200 m freestyle	2:00.90	55	Did not advance			
Myat Thu Lin	200 m breaststroke	2:31.63	37	Did not advance			
Myat Thu Lin	100 m butterfly	1:00.44	74	Did not advance			

Women

Athlete	Event	Heat		Semifinal		Final	
Athlete	Event	Time	Rank	Time	Rank	Time	Rank
Honey Nan	50 m butterfly	29.67	65	Did not advance			
Honey Nan	100 m butterfly	1:09.89	54	Did not advance			
