= Belgium at the 2025 World Aquatics Championships =

- Flag of Belgium
- World Aquatics code: BEL
- National federation: Royal Belgian Swimming Federation
- Website: belswim.be (in Dutch)

in Singapore
- Competitors: 5 in 2 sports
- Medals Ranked 23rd: Gold 0 Silver 1 Bronze 1 Total 2

World Aquatics Championships appearances
- 1973; 1975; 1978; 1982; 1986; 1991; 1994; 1998; 2001; 2003; 2005; 2007; 2009; 2011; 2013; 2015; 2017; 2019; 2022; 2023; 2024; 2025

Belgium is competing at the 2025 World Aquatics Championships in Singapore from 11 July to 3 August 2025.

== Medalists ==
Medal	Name	Sport	Event	Date
2nd place, silver medalist(s)	Roos Vanotterdijk	Swimming	Women's 100 metre butterfly	28 July 2025
3rd place, bronze medalist(s)	Roos Vanotterdijk	Swimming	Women's 50 metre butterfly	2 August 2025

== Competitors ==
The following is the list of competitors in the Championships.

Sport	Men	Women	Total
Open water swimming	1	0	1
Swimming	1	3	4
Total	2	3	5

== Open water swimming ==
Men

Athlete	Event	Final	
Athlete	Event	Time	Rank
Logan Vanhuys	5 km	1:02:10.50	40
Logan Vanhuys	10 km	2:07:52.70	31

== Swimming ==
Men

Athlete	Event	Heat		Semifinal		Final	
Athlete	Event	Time	Rank	Time	Rank	Time	Rank
Lucas Henveaux	200 m freestyle	1:46.03 NR	7 Q	1:46.23	13	Did not advance	
Lucas Henveaux	400 m freestyle	3:46.68	12	—		Did not advance	
Lucas Henveaux	200 m medley	1:58.92	14 Q	2:00.18	16	Did not advance	

Women

Athlete	Event	Heat		Semifinal		Final	
Athlete	Event	Time	Rank	Time	Rank	Time	Rank
Florine Gaspard	50 m freestyle	24.64	10 Q	24.45	8 Q	24.63	7
Florine Gaspard	100 m freestyle	53.71	6 Q	53.87	11	Did not advance	
Florine Gaspard	100 m breaststroke	1:06.89 NR	14 Q	1:07.46	16	Did not advance	
Camille Henveaux	200 m freestyle	2:02.37	35	Did not advance			
Camille Henveaux	400 m freestyle	4:16.93	23	—		Did not advance	
Roos Vanotterdijk	50 m freestyle	25.09	23	Did not advance			
Roos Vanotterdijk	100 m freestyle	53.98	10 Q	53.87	11	Did not advance	
Roos Vanotterdijk	50 m backstroke	27.87	12 Q	27.67 NR	11	Did not advance	
Roos Vanotterdijk	100 m backstroke	59.37	6 Q	59.63	10	Did not advance	
Roos Vanotterdijk	50 m butterfly	25.79	14 Q	25.32	2 Q	25.43	3rd place, bronze medalist(s)
Roos Vanotterdijk	100 m butterfly	56.66NR	3 Q	56.07 NR	1 Q	55.84 NR	2nd place, silver medalist(s)
