= Canada at the 2025 World Aquatics Championships =

- Flag of Canada
- World Aquatics code: CAN
- National federation: Aquatic Federation of Canada

in Singapore 11 July 2025 – 3 August 2025
- Competitors: 65 in 6 sports
- Medals Ranked 8th: Gold 4 Silver 1 Bronze 4 Total 9

World Aquatics Championships appearances
- 1973; 1975; 1978; 1982; 1986; 1991; 1994; 1998; 2001; 2003; 2005; 2007; 2009; 2011; 2013; 2015; 2017; 2019; 2022; 2023; 2024; 2025

Canada competed at the 2025 World Aquatics Championships in Singapore from July 11 to August 3, 2025.

The Canadian team consisted of 65 (33 men and 32 women) athletes competing in all six disciplines. Canada won a total of nine medals (four gold, one silver and four bronze), eight in swimming and one in high diving.

== Medalists ==
The following Canadian competitors won medals at the Championships. In the by discipline sections below, medallists' names are bolded.

Medal	Name	Sport	Event	Date
1st place, gold medalist(s)	Summer McIntosh	Swimming	Women's 400 m freestyle	July 27
1st place, gold medalist(s)	Summer McIntosh	Swimming	Women's 200 metre individual medley	July 28
1st place, gold medalist(s)	Summer McIntosh	Swimming	Women's 200 metre butterfly	July 31
1st place, gold medalist(s)	Summer McIntosh	Swimming	Women's 400 metre individual medley	August 3
2nd place, silver medalist(s)	Simone Leathead	High diving	Women's event	July 26
3rd place, bronze medalist(s)	Mary-Sophie Harvey	Swimming	Women's 200 metre individual medley	July 28
3rd place, bronze medalist(s)	Kylie Masse; Oliver Dawson; Josh Liendo; Taylor Ruck; Brooklyn Douthwright; Ingrid Wilm	Swimming	Mixed 4 × 100 metre medley relay	July 30
3rd place, bronze medalist(s)	Ilya Kharun	Swimming	Men's 100 metre butterfly	August 2
3rd place, bronze medalist(s)	Summer McIntosh	Swimming	Women's 800 m freestyle	August 2

== Athletes by discipline ==
The following is the list of number of competitors participating at the Championships per discipline.

Sport	Men	Women	Total
Artistic swimming	0	12	12
Diving	4	5	9
High diving	1	2	3
Open water swimming	1	1	2
Swimming	13	12	25
Water polo	14	0	14
Total	33	32	65

== Artistic swimming ==
Canada Artistic Swimming named a team of 12 athletes (all women) on July 2, 2025. Scarlett Finn was named to the team but did not compete in any event.

Women

Athlete	Event	Preliminaries		Final	
Athlete	Event	Points	Rank	Points	Rank
Audrey Lamothe	Solo technical routine	234.7058	11 **Q**	236.6008	10
Audrey Lamothe	Solo free routine	219.5675	7 **Q**	224.2263	8
Audrey Lamothe; Ximena Ortiz	Duet technical routine	271.6526	9 **Q**	236.5825	12
Audrey Lamothe; Ximena Ortiz	Duet free routine	233.0079	11 **Q**	238.0437	9
Georgia Hock; Halle Pratt; Laurianne Imbeau; Kenzie Priddell; Ximena Ortiz; Alicia Rehel; Raphaelle Plante; Claire Scheffel	Team acrobatic routine	203.1652	6 **Q**	202.7948	7
Georgia Hock; Laurianne Imbeau; Kenzie Priddell; Alicia Rehel; Raphaelle Plante; Claire Scheffel; Florence Tremblay; Olena Verbinska	Team technical routine	244.3817	10 **Q**	266.5116	9

== Diving ==
Diving Canada named a team of ten divers (four men and five women) on July 3, 2025.

Men

Athlete	Event	Preliminaries		Semifinals		Final	
Athlete	Event	Points	Rank	Points	Rank	Points	Rank
Tazman Abramowicz	1 m springboard	288.45	39	—N/a		Did not advance	
Carson Paul	3 m springboard	391.75	12 **Q**	392.65	14	Did not advance	
Matt Cullen	10 m platform	342.55	33	Did not advance			
Benjamin Tessier	10 m platform	387.10	16 **Q**	443.20	9 **Q**	445.30	9
Tazman Abramowicz; Carson Paul	3 m synchro springboard	338.04	15	—N/a		Did not advance	
Matt Cullen; Benjamin Tessier	10 m synchro platform	343.41	11	—N/a		Did not advance	

Women

Athlete	Event	Preliminaries		Semifinals		Final	
Athlete	Event	Points	Rank	Points	Rank	Points	Rank
Margo Erlam	1 m springboard	234.65	17	—N/a		Did not advance	
Sonya Palkhivala	1 m springboard	218.75	24	—N/a		Did not advance	
Margo Erlam	3 m springboard	260.10	20	Did not advance			
Amélie‑Laura Jasmin	3 m springboard	290.10	10 **Q**	282.40	10 **Q**	271.50	11
Katelyn Fung	10 m platform	285.20	12 **Q**	314.80	5 **Q**	343.20	4
Kate Miller	10 m platform	242.05	27	Did not advance			
Amélie‑Laura Jasmin; Sonya Palkhivala	3 m synchro springboard	243.00	10	—N/a		Did not advance	
Katelyn Fung; Kate Miller	10 m synchro platform	277.77	8 **Q**	—N/a		269.34	8

Mixed

Athlete	Event	Final	
Athlete	Event	Points	Rank
Carson Paul; Katelyn Fung; Amélie-Laura Jasmin; Matt Cullen	Team event	349.20	10

== High diving ==
Diving Canada named a team of three high divers (one man and two women) on July 3, 2025. On July 26, 2025, Simone Leathead won Canada's first medal of the Championships in the women's high diving event.

Athlete	Event	Points	Rank
Michaël Foisy	Men's	307.60	15
Molly Carlson	Women's	271.90	9
**Simone Leathead**	Women's	314.50	2nd place, silver medalist(s)

== Open water swimming ==
Swimming Canada entered two open water swimmers, who also qualified to compete in the pool competitions. Both athletes finished as the top Canadian at the 2025 USA Swimming Open Water National Championships in Sarasota, Florida.

Athlete	Event	Heat		Semi-final		Final	
Athlete	Event	Time	Rank	Time	Rank	Time	Rank
Eric Brown	Men's 3 km knockout sprints	17:10.1	7 **Q**	11:33.1	11	Did not advance	
Eric Brown	Men's 5 km	—N/a				58:08.6	13
Eric Brown	Men's 10 km	—N/a				2:04:04.6	21
Emma Finlin	Women's 3 km knockout sprints	18:42.0	16	Did not advance			
Emma Finlin	Women's 5 km	—N/a				1:04:37.2	19
Emma Finlin	Women's 10 km	—N/a				2:19:47.8	26

== Swimming ==
Swimming Canada entered 26 swimmers (13 per gender) plus the two open water swimmers (one per gender) for a total of 28 swimmers (14 per gender). The team was selected based on the results of the 2025 Canadian Swimming Trials held in Victoria, British Columbia in June 2025. On July 4th it was announced Penny Oleksiak had withdrawn from the team, dropping the team to 27 swimmers (14 men and 13 women).

Men

Athlete	Event	Heat		Semifinal		Final	
Athlete	Event	Time	Rank	Time	Rank	Time	Rank
Joshua Liendo	50 metre freestyle	22.22	=30	Did not advance			
Ruslan Gaziev	100 metre freestyle	48.41	18	Did not advance			
Antoine Sauve	200 metre freestyle	1:49.19	37	Did not advance			
Ethan Ekk	400 metre freestyle	3:46.01	9	—N/a		Did not advance	
Ethan Ekk	800 metre freestyle	7:53.30	14	—N/a		Did not advance	
Cole Pratt	50 metre backstroke	25.20	30	Did not advance			
Blake Tierney	100 metre backstroke	54.81	34	Did not advance			
Ethan Ekk	200 metre backstroke	1:57.20	18	Did not advance			
Blake Tierney	200 metre backstroke	1:55.17 **NR**	1 **Q**	1:55.03 **NR**	5 **Q**	1:55.09	4
Oliver Dawson	50 metre breaststroke	27.55	=32	Did not advance			
Finlay Knox	100 metre breaststroke	1:01.05	29	Did not advance			
Oliver Dawson	200 metre breaststroke	2:11.07	11 **Q**	2:10.32	11	Did not advance	
Ilya Kharun	50 metre butterfly	22.85	3 **Q**	22.92	9	Did not advance	
Joshua Liendo	50 metre butterfly	23.16	9 **Q**	23.00	11	Did not advance	
**Ilya Kharun**	100 metre butterfly	50.70	2 **Q**	50.39	4 **Q**	50.07	3rd place, bronze medalist(s)
Joshua Liendo	100 metre butterfly	51.04	5 **Q**	50.24	2 **Q**	50.09	4
Ilya Kharun	200 metre butterfly	1:53.74	3 **Q**	1:54.43	5 **Q**	1:54.34	4
Tristan Jankovics	200 metre individual medley	1:58.61	12 **Q**	1:59.13	13	Did not advance	
Finlay Knox	200 metre individual medley	1:59.64	18	Did not advance			
Tristan Jankovics	400 metre individual medley	Did not start		—N/a		Did not advance	
Lorne Wigginton	400 metre individual medley	4:16.61	14	—N/a		Did not advance	
Ruslan Gaziev; Joshua Liendo; Antoine Sauve; Filip Senc-Samardzic	4 × 100 m freestyle relay	3:12.64	5 **Q**	—N/a		3:12.89	8
Ethan Ekk; Jordi Vilchez; Antoine Sauve; Filip Senc-Samardzic	4 × 200 m freestyle relay	7:12.36	12	—N/a		Did not advance	
Blake Tierney; Ruslan Gaziev; Ilya Kharun; Oliver Dawson	4 × 100 m medley relay	3:30.86 **NR**	4 **Q**	—N/a		3:29.75 **NR**	5

Women

Athlete	Event	Heat		Semifinal		Final	
Athlete	Event	Time	Rank	Time	Rank	Time	Rank
Taylor Ruck	50 metre freestyle	24.63	9 **Q**	24.53	10	Did not advance	
Taylor Ruck	100 metre freestyle	54.45	18	Did not advance			
Mary-Sophie Harvey	200 metre freestyle	1:57.72	13 **Q**	1:58.57	15	Did not advance	
Ella Jansen	200 metre freestyle	1:57.53	=8 **Q**	1:57.60	11	Did not advance	
**Summer McIntosh**	400 metre freestyle	4:03.11	=3 **Q**	—N/a		3:56.26	1st place, gold medalist(s)
Ella Jansen	400 metre freestyle	4:11.01	17	—N/a		Did not advance	
**Summer McIntosh**	800 metre freestyle	8:19.88	3 **Q**	—N/a		8:07.29	3rd place, bronze medalist(s)
Kylie Masse	50 metre backstroke	27.46	1 **Q**	27.50	6 **Q**	27.33	4
Ingrid Wilm	50 metre backstroke	27.76	8 **Q**	27.48	5 **Q**	27.56	8
Kylie Masse	100 metre backstroke	59.71	9 **Q**	58.66	3 **Q**	58.42	4
Taylor Ruck	100 metre backstroke	59.71	8 **Q**	59.18	5 **Q**	59.59	7
Madison Kryger	200 metre backstroke	2:11.40	19	Did not advance			
Ingrid Wilm	200 metre backstroke	2:10.11	14 **Q**	2:10.28	13	Did not advance	
Alexanne Lepage	50 metre breaststroke	30.98	22	Did not advance			
Alexanne Lepage	100 metre breaststroke	1:07.35	25	Did not advance			
Sophie Angus	200 metre breaststroke	2:27.51	20	Did not advance			
Mary-Sophie Harvey	200 metre breaststroke	2:26.95	17	Did not advance			
Taylor Ruck	50 metre butterfly	25.95	15 **Q**	25.71	13	Did not advance	
Brooklyn Douthwright	100 metre butterfly	59.25	26	Did not advance			
**Summer McIntosh**	200 metre butterfly	2:07.07	1 **Q**	2:06.22	2 **Q**	2:01.99 **CR**, **AM**	1st place, gold medalist(s)
**Mary-Sophie Harvey**	200 metre individual medley	2:09.95	4 **Q**	2:10.19	6 **Q**	2:09.15	3rd place, bronze medalist(s)
**Summer McIntosh**	200 metre individual medley	2:09.46	2 **Q**	2:07.39	1 **Q**	2:06.69	1st place, gold medalist(s)
Mary-Sophie Harvey	400 metre individual medley	Did not start		—N/a		Did not advance	
**Summer McIntosh**	400 metre individual medley	4:35.56	1 **Q**	—N/a		4:25.78 **CR**	1st place, gold medalist(s)
Brooklyn Douthwright; Taylor Ruck; Sienna Angove; Ingrid Wilm	4 × 100 m freestyle relay	3:37.50	9	—N/a		Did not advance	
Brooklyn Douthwright; Ella Cosgrove; Sienna Angove; Ella Jansen	4 × 200 m freestyle relay	7:54.90	5 **Q**	—N/a		7:52.52	6
Sophie Angus; Mary-Sophie Harvey; Ella Jansen; Kylie Masse	4 × 100 m medley relay	3:58.32	6 **Q**	—N/a		3:55.63	5

Mixed

Athlete	Event	Heat		Final	
Athlete	Event	Time	Rank	Time	Rank
Ruslan Gaziev; Mary-Sophie Harvey; Joshua Liendo; Taylor Ruck; Antoine Sauve; Brooklyn Douthwright	4 × 100 freestyle relay	3:24.94	8 **Q**	3:23.16	6
**Kylie Masse**; **Oliver Dawson**; **Josh Liendo**; **Taylor Ruck**; **Brooklyn Douthwright***; **Ingrid Wilm***	4 × 100 medley relay	3:43.47	5 **Q**	3:40.90 **NR**	3rd place, bronze medalist(s)

- *Participated in heats but received medals

== Water polo ==
Summary

Team	Event	Group stage				Playoff	9th–12th Semifinal	11th place match	
Team	Event	Opposition Score	Opposition Score	Opposition Score	Rank	Opposition Score	Opposition Score	Opposition Score	Rank
Canada men's team	Men's tournament	United States; **L** 9–18	Singapore; **W** 22–10	Brazil; **L** 18–19	3 **Q**	Montenegro; **L** 10–22	Romania; **L** 12–18	Brazil; **W** 16–11	11

=== Men's tournament ===
Canada's men's water polo team qualified by finishing in the top two at the 2024 Pan American Water Polo Championship in Ibagué, Colombia.

Team roster

The team of 14 athletes was named on June 27, 2025.

- Jérémie Côté
- Bogdan Djerkovic
- Reuel D'Souza
- Aleksa Gardijan
- Andrej Gavric
- Nikolas Gerakoudis
- Leo Hachem
- David Lapins
- Brody Mcknight
- Jason O’Donnell
- Roko Pozaric
- Milan Radenovic
- Aria Soleimanipak
- Bor Tanasijevic

Group play

Pos	Team	Pld	W	PSW	PSL	L	GF	GA	GD	Pts	Qualification
1	United States	3	3	0	0	0	60	22	+38	**9**	Quarterfinals
2	Brazil	3	1	1	0	1	37	35	+2	**5**	Playoffs
3	Canada	3	1	0	1	1	42	39	+3	**4**	Playoffs
4	Singapore (H)	3	0	0	0	3	24	67	−43	**0**	13–16th place semifinals

Source: Omegatiming
Rules for classification: 1) points; 2) head-to-head points; 3) head-to-head goal difference; 4) head-to-head number of goals scored; 5) Goal difference.
(H) Host

12 July 2025; 10:35	Report	Canada	9–**18**	**United States**	OCBC Aquatic Centre, Singapore; Referees: Dasch Barber (RSA), Ivan Raković (SRB)
12 July 2025; 10:35	Report	Score by quarters: 0–**3**, 2–**4**, 2–**5**, 5–**6**			OCBC Aquatic Centre, Singapore; Referees: Dasch Barber (RSA), Ivan Raković (SRB)
12 July 2025; 10:35	Report	Oussadou 3	**Goals**	Irving 4	OCBC Aquatic Centre, Singapore; Referees: Dasch Barber (RSA), Ivan Raković (SRB)

14 July 2025; 19:10	Report	Singapore	10–**22**	**Canada**	OCBC Aquatic Centre, Singapore; Referees: Tamás Kovács (HUN), Mihai Balanescu (ROU)
14 July 2025; 19:10	Report	Score by quarters: 5–**7**, 2–**5**, 2–**4**, 1–**6**			OCBC Aquatic Centre, Singapore; Referees: Tamás Kovács (HUN), Mihai Balanescu (ROU)
14 July 2025; 19:10	Report	Goh 4	**Goals**	D'Souza 7	OCBC Aquatic Centre, Singapore; Referees: Tamás Kovács (HUN), Mihai Balanescu (ROU)

16 July 2025; 09:00	Report	Canada	18–**19** (PSO)	**Brazil**	OCBC Aquatic Centre, Singapore; Referees: Mihai Balanescu (ROU), Chisato Kurosaki (JPN)
16 July 2025; 09:00	Report	Score by quarters: **6**–2, 1–**3**, 3–**4**, 1–**2** PSO: 7–**8**			OCBC Aquatic Centre, Singapore; Referees: Mihai Balanescu (ROU), Chisato Kurosaki (JPN)
16 July 2025; 09:00	Report	Côté, D'Souza 3	**Goals**	Andrade 8	OCBC Aquatic Centre, Singapore; Referees: Mihai Balanescu (ROU), Chisato Kurosaki (JPN)

Playoffs

18 July 2025; 20:45	Report	Canada	10–**22**	**Montenegro**	OCBC Aquatic Centre, Singapore; Referees: Nicholas Hodgers (AUS), Scott Voltz (USA)
18 July 2025; 20:45	Report	Score by quarters: 3–**7**, 0–**5**, 4–**5**, 3–**5**			OCBC Aquatic Centre, Singapore; Referees: Nicholas Hodgers (AUS), Scott Voltz (USA)
18 July 2025; 20:45	Report	D'Souza, O'Donnell 3	**Goals**	Ćetković 5	OCBC Aquatic Centre, Singapore; Referees: Nicholas Hodgers (AUS), Scott Voltz (USA)

9th–12th place semifinals

20 July 2025; 13:45	Report	**Romania**	**18**–12	Canada	OCBC Aquatic Centre, Singapore; Referees: Stanko Ivanovski (MNE), Nicholas Hodgers (AUS)
20 July 2025; 13:45	Report	Score by quarters: **5**–1, 3–3, **5**–4, **5**–4			OCBC Aquatic Centre, Singapore; Referees: Stanko Ivanovski (MNE), Nicholas Hodgers (AUS)
20 July 2025; 13:45	Report	Iudean 5	**Goals**	D'Souza 4	OCBC Aquatic Centre, Singapore; Referees: Stanko Ivanovski (MNE), Nicholas Hodgers (AUS)

11th place match

22 July 2025; 09:00	Report	Brazil	11–**16**	**Canada**	OCBC Aquatic Centre, Singapore; Referees: David Gómez (ESP), Nicholas Hodgers (AUS)
22 July 2025; 09:00	Report	Score by quarters: **3**–1, 2–**4**, 1–**5**, 5–**6**			OCBC Aquatic Centre, Singapore; Referees: David Gómez (ESP), Nicholas Hodgers (AUS)
22 July 2025; 09:00	Report	Guimarães 5	**Goals**	D'Souza 7	OCBC Aquatic Centre, Singapore; Referees: David Gómez (ESP), Nicholas Hodgers (AUS)
