= Swimming at the 2025 World Aquatics Championships – Men's 100 metre butterfly =

Men's 100 metre butterfly at the 2025 World Aquatics Championships
- Venue: World Aquatics Championships Arena
- Location: Singapore Sports Hub, Kallang
- Dates: 1 August (heats and semifinals); 2 August (final)
- Competitors: 76 from 66 nations
- Winning time: 49.62

Medalists
| gold medal | Maxime Grousset | France |
| silver medal | Noè Ponti | Switzerland |
| bronze medal | Ilya Kharun | Canada |

The men's 100 metre butterfly event at the 2025 World Aquatics Championships was held from 1 to 2 August 2025 at the World Aquatics Championships Arena at the Singapore Sports Hub in Kallang, Singapore.

== Background ==
The event did not feature world record holder Caeleb Dressel or European record holder Kristóf Milák, but the field included 14 swimmers with lifetime bests under 51 seconds. Maxime Grousset of France led the 2024–25 season rankings, having improved his national record to 50.11 at the 2025 French Elite Championships. Canada’s Ilya Kharun and Josh Liendo ranked third and fourth in 2025 with 50.37 and 50.46, respectively; Liendo was the 2024 Olympic silver medalist and Canadian record holder with 49.99. Switzerland’s Noè Ponti, fourth at the Olympics, had a 2025 best of 50.27. Other notable competitors included Hubert Kós of Hungary, Nyls Korstanje of the Netherlands, and Shaine Casas of the United States, all ranked among the top six this season.

== Qualification ==
Each National Federation was permitted to enter a maximum of two qualified athletes in each individual event, but they could do so only if both of them had attained the "A" standard qualification time. For this event, the "A" standard qualification time was 51.77. Federations could enter one athlete into the event if they met the "B" standard qualification time. For this event, the "B" standard qualification time was 53.58. Athletes could also enter the event if they had met an "A" or "B" standard in a different event and their Federation had not entered anyone else. Additional considerations applied to Federations who had few swimmers enter through the standard qualification times. Federations in this category could at least enter two men and two women to the competition, all of whom could enter into up to two events.

Top 10 fastest qualification times
| Swimmer | Country | Time | Competition |
|---|---|---|---|
| Kristóf Milák | Hungary | 49.90 | 2024 Summer Olympics |
| Josh Liendo | Canada | 49.99 | 2024 Summer Olympics |
| Maxime Grousset | France | 50.11 | 2025 French Elite |
| Noè Ponti | Switzerland | 50.16 | 2024 Swiss Championships |
| Caeleb Dressel | United States | 50.19 | 2024 United States Olympic Trials |
| Ilya Kharun | Canada | 50.37 | 2025 Canadian Trials |
| Shaine Casas | United States | 50.51 | 2025 United States Championships |
| Hubert Kós | Hungary | 50.55 | 2025 Hungarian Championships |
| Nyls Korstanje | Netherlands | 50.59 | Olympic Games Paris 2024 |
| Matthew Temple | Australia | 50.61 | 2024 New South Wales Championships |

== Records ==
Prior to the competition, the existing world and championship records were as follows.

| World record | Caeleb Dressel (USA) | 49.45 | Tokyo, Japan | 31 July 2021 |
| Competition record | Caeleb Dressel (USA) | 49.50 | Gwangju, South Korea | 26 July 2019 |

== Heats ==
The heats took place on 1 August at 10:02.

| Rank | Heat | Lane | Swimmer | Nation | Time | Notes |
|---|---|---|---|---|---|---|
| 1 | 6 | 4 | Noè Ponti | Switzerland | 50.68 | Q |
| 2 | 8 | 5 | Ilya Kharun | Canada | 50.70 | Q |
| 3 | 8 | 6 | Andrey Minakov | Neutral Athletes B | 50.93 | Q |
| 4 | 7 | 3 | Matthew Temple | Australia | 50.97 | Q |
| 5 | 8 | 4 | Josh Liendo | Canada | 51.04 | Q |
| 6 | 7 | 1 | Simon Bucher | Austria | 51.16 | Q, NR |
| 7 | 8 | 7 | Jesse Coleman | Australia | 51.20 | Q |
| 8 | 7 | 6 | Katsuhiro Matsumoto | Japan | 51.30 | Q |
| 9 | 8 | 9 | Diogo Ribeiro | Portugal | 51.34 | Q |
| 10 | 6 | 6 | Jakub Majerski | Poland | 51.35 | Q |
| 11 | 6 | 0 | Edward Mildred | Great Britain | 51.36 | Q |
| 11 | 7 | 4 | Maxime Grousset | France | 51.36 | Q |
| 11 | 8 | 1 | Thomas Ceccon | Italy | 51.36 | Q |
| 14 | 6 | 2 | Naoki Mizunuma | Japan | 51.44 | Q |
| 15 | 8 | 8 | Gal Cohen Groumi | Israel | 51.46 | Q |
| 16 | 7 | 2 | Clément Secchi | France | 51.58 | Q |
| 17 | 8 | 0 | Federico Burdisso | Italy | 51.59 | |
| 18 | 5 | 2 | Denis Popescu | Romania | 51.61 | |
| 19 | 7 | 5 | Shaine Casas | United States | 51.66 | |
| 20 | 8 | 3 | Nyls Korstanje | Netherlands | 51.67 | |
| 21 | 7 | 0 | Ksawery Masiuk | Poland | 51.79 | |
| 22 | 7 | 9 | Adilbek Mussik | Kazakhstan | 51.87 | |
| 23 | 6 | 8 | Xu Fang | China | 51.90 | |
| 24 | 6 | 9 | Quah Zheng Wen | Singapore | 51.92 | |
| 25 | 8 | 2 | Chen Juner | China | 51.95 | |
| 26 | 6 | 3 | Thomas Heilman | United States | 52.02 | |
| 27 | 7 | 7 | Luca Armbruster | Germany | 52.05 | |
| 28 | 7 | 8 | Casper Puggaard | Denmark | 52.22 | |
| 29 | 6 | 1 | Josha Salchow | Germany | 52.24 | |
| 30 | 6 | 7 | Mikhail Antipov | Neutral Athletes B | 52.26 | |
| 31 | 4 | 6 | Eldor Usmonov | Uzbekistan | 52.46 | |
| 32 | 5 | 5 | Ulises Cazau | Argentina | 52.60 | |
| 33 | 5 | 8 | Konstantinos Stamou | Greece | 52.81 | |
| 34 | 4 | 2 | Jack Cassin | Ireland | 52.84 | |
| 35 | 4 | 4 | Grigori Pekarski | Neutral Athletes A | 52.90 | |
| 36 | 5 | 4 | Vili Sivec | Croatia | 53.01 | |
| 37 | 5 | 6 | Alex Ahtiainen | Estonia | 53.04 | |
| 38 | 4 | 7 | Denys Kesil | Ukraine | 53.05 | |
| 39 | 5 | 3 | Arbidel González | Spain | 53.12 | |
| 40 | 5 | 7 | Jorge Iga | Mexico | 53.14 | |
| 41 | 3 | 3 | Jesse Ssengonzi | Uganda | 53.32 | NR |
| 42 | 3 | 4 | Josh Kirlew | Jamaica | 53.68 | |
| 43 | 3 | 2 | Samuel Kostal | Slovakia | 53.69 | |
| 44 | 4 | 3 | Miloš Milenković | Montenegro | 53.74 | |
| 45 | 3 | 6 | Raekwon Noel | Guyana | 53.91 | NR |
| 45 | 5 | 9 | Jorge Otaiza | Venezuela | 53.91 | |
| 47 | 5 | 0 | Benedicton Rohit Beniston Manickaraj | India | 53.92 | |
| 48 | 3 | 7 | Oscar Peyre Mitilla | Rwanda | 54.44 | |
| 49 | 4 | 8 | Birnir Freyr Hálfdánarson | Iceland | 54.59 | |
| 50 | 4 | 1 | Navaphat Wongcharoen | Thailand | 54.76 | |
| 51 | 3 | 1 | Esteban Nuñez | Bolivia | 54.82 | |
| 52 | 4 | 0 | Luka Jovanović | Serbia | 54.84 | |
| 53 | 2 | 4 | Zackary Gresham | Grenada | 55.46 | |
| 54 | 3 | 8 | Ramil Valizada | Azerbaijan | 55.53 | |
| 55 | 3 | 9 | Julien Henx | Luxembourg | 55.57 | |
| 56 | 1 | 1 | Victor Ah Yong | Mauritius | 55.76 | NR |
| 57 | 1 | 2 | Yousif Bu Arish | Saudi Arabia | 55.99 | |
| 58 | 3 | 0 | Antoine Destang | Saint Lucia | 56.19 | |
| 59 | 4 | 9 | Nika Tchitchiashvili | Georgia | 56.42 | |
| 60 | 1 | 6 | Lucas de los Santos | Uruguay | 56.53 | |
| 61 | 2 | 3 | Kaio Faftine | Mozambique | 56.86 | |
| 62 | 2 | 5 | Sebastián Serafeim | Honduras | 56.88 | |
| 63 | 1 | 4 | Lam Chi Chong | Macau | 57.50 | |
| 64 | 2 | 1 | Stephen Nyoike | Kenya | 57.51 | |
| 65 | 2 | 8 | Israel Poppe | Guam | 57.96 | |
| 66 | 2 | 2 | Mohammad Al-Otaibi | Kuwait | 58.09 | |
| 67 | 1 | 7 | Salem Sabt | United Arab Emirates | 58.10 | |
| 68 | 2 | 0 | Jefferson Kpanou | Benin | 58.16 | |
| 69 | 2 | 6 | Collins Saliboko | Tanzania | 58.43 | |
| 70 | 2 | 9 | Kokoro Frost | Samoa | 58.82 | |
| 71 | 2 | 7 | Mohamad Masoud | Athlete Refugee Team | 59.01 | |
| 72 | 1 | 0 | Clinton Opute | Nigeria | 59.29 | |
| 73 | 1 | 3 | Naeem de Souza | Antigua and Barbuda | 1:00.16 | |
| 74 | 1 | 8 | Lin Myat Thu | Myanmar | 1:00.44 | |
| 75 | 1 | 5 | Charlie Gibbons | Palau | 1:01.89 | |
| | 3 | 5 | Abeku Jackson | Ghana | Disqualified | |
| | 4 | 5 | Bryan Leong | Malaysia | Did not start | |
| | 5 | 1 | Tajus Juska | Lithuania | Did not start | |
| | 6 | 5 | Hubert Kós | Hungary | Did not start | |

== Semifinals ==
Semifinals took place on 1 August at 19:10.

| Rank | Heat | Lane | Swimmer | Nation | Time | Notes |
|---|---|---|---|---|---|---|
| 1 | 2 | 4 | Noè Ponti | Switzerland | 50.18 | Q |
| 2 | 2 | 3 | Josh Liendo | Canada | 50.24 | Q |
| 3 | 1 | 7 | Maxime Grousset | France | 50.25 | Q |
| 4 | 1 | 4 | Ilya Kharun | Canada | 50.39 | Q |
| 5 | 2 | 1 | Thomas Ceccon | Italy | 50.42 | Q, NR |
| 6 | 1 | 5 | Matthew Temple | Australia | 50.83 | Q |
| 7 | 2 | 5 | Andrey Minakov | Neutral Athletes B | 50.87 | Q |
| 8 | 1 | 3 | Simon Bucher | Austria | 50.88 | Q, NR |
| 9 | 1 | 1 | Naoki Mizunuma | Japan | 50.96 | |
| 10 | 2 | 6 | Jesse Coleman | Australia | 51.14 | |
| 11 | 1 | 6 | Katsuhiro Matsumoto | Japan | 51.20 | |
| 12 | 2 | 2 | Diogo Ribeiro | Portugal | 51.21 | |
| 13 | 1 | 8 | Clément Secchi | France | 51.23 | |
| 14 | 1 | 2 | Jakub Majerski | Poland | 51.40 | |
| 15 | 2 | 7 | Edward Mildred | Great Britain | 51.61 | |
| 16 | 2 | 8 | Gal Cohen Groumi | Israel | 51.64 | |

== Final ==
The final took place on 2 August at 19:43.

| Rank | Lane | Name | Nationality | Time | Notes |
|---|---|---|---|---|---|
| 1st place, gold medalist(s) | 3 | Maxime Grousset | France | 49.62 | ER |
| 2nd place, silver medalist(s) | 4 | Noè Ponti | Switzerland | 49.83 | NR |
| 3rd place, bronze medalist(s) | 6 | Ilya Kharun | Canada | 50.07 | |
| 4 | 5 | Josh Liendo | Canada | 50.09 | |
| 5 | 7 | Matthew Temple | Australia | 50.57 | |
| 6 | 1 | Andrei Minakov | Neutral Athletes B | 50.90 | |
| 7 | 8 | Simon Bucher | Austria | 50.92 | |
| 8 | 2 | Thomas Ceccon | Italy | 51.12 | |
