= Swimming at the 2025 World Aquatics Championships – Women's 100 metre butterfly =

Women's 100 metre butterfly at the 2025 World Aquatics Championships
- Venue: World Aquatics Championships Arena
- Location: Singapore Sports Hub, Kallang
- Dates: 27 July (heats and semifinals); 28 July (final)
- Competitors: 58 from 53 nations
- Winning time: 54.73

Medalists
| gold medal | Gretchen Walsh | United States |
| silver medal | Roos Vanotterdijk | Belgium |
| bronze medal | Alexandria Perkins | Australia |

The women's 100 metre butterfly event at the 2025 World Aquatics Championships was held from 27 to 28 July 2025 at the World Aquatics Championships Arena at the Singapore Sports Hub in Kallang, Singapore.

== Background ==
Gretchen Walsh of the United States was the front-runner in the event. She had set a world record of 54.60 seconds in 2025 and had also swum 54.76 at the 2025 United States Nationals, giving her the seven fastest swims in history and a 1.82-second lead over the second fastest swimmer in 2025. The US's Torri Huske (55.52 best, 56.59 in 2025), won the event at the 2024 Olympics, where she overtook Walsh in the final part of the race.

Germany’s Angelina Köhler, Australia’s Alexandria Perkins (both 56.42), and China’s Zhang Yufei (57.39) were also in contention for medals. Likely finalists included Japan’s Mizuki Hirai, Sweden’s Louise Hansson, Belgium’s Roos Vanotterdijk, the Netherlands’ Tessa Giele, and Japan’s Rikako Ikee.

== Qualification ==
Each National Federation was permitted to enter a maximum of two qualified athletes in each individual event, but they could do so only if both of them had attained the "A" standard qualification time. For this event, the "A" standard qualification time was 58.33 seconds. Federations could enter one athlete into the event if they met the "B" standard qualification time. For this event, the "B" standard qualification time was 1:00.37. Athletes could also enter the event if they had met an "A" or "B" standard in a different event and their Federation had not entered anyone else. Additional considerations applied to Federations who had few swimmers enter through the standard qualification times. Federations in this category could at least enter two men and two women to the competition, all of whom could enter into up to two events.

Top 10 fastest qualification times
| Swimmer | Country | Time | Competition |
|---|---|---|---|
| Gretchen Walsh | United States | 54.60 | Fort Lauderdale stop of the 2025 TYR Pro Swim Series |
| Torri Huske | United States | 55.52 | 2024 United States Olympic Trials |
| Regan Smith | United States | 55.62 | 2024 United States Olympic Trials |
| Zhang Yufei | China | 56.15 | 2024 Summer Olympics |
| Angelina Köhler | Germany | 56.33 | 2025 Berlin Swim Open |
| Alexandra Perkins | Australia | 56.42 | 2025 Australian Trials |
| Maggie Mac Neil | Canada | 56.44 | 2024 Summer Olympics |
| Emma McKeon | Australia | 56.58 | 2024 Australian Championships |
| Mizuki Hirai | Japan | 56.71 | 2024 Summer Olympics |
| Brianna Throssell | Australia | 56.77 | 2024 Australian Championships |

== Records ==
Prior to the competition, the existing world and championship records were as follows.

| World record | Gretchen Walsh (USA) | 54.60 | Fort Lauderdale, United States | 3 May 2025 |
| Competition record | Sarah Sjöström (SWE) | 55.53 | Budapest, Hungary | 24 July 2017 |

The following new records were set during this competition.

| Date | Event | Name | Nationality | Time | Record |
|---|---|---|---|---|---|
| 28 July | Final | Gretchen Walsh | United States | 54.73 | CR |

== Heats ==
The heats took place on 27 July at 10:51. Shortly before the heats, USA Swimming announced that Torri Huske had withdrawn from the event to focus on the 4 × 100 metre freestyle relay. The US's Gretchen Walsh swam the fastest qualifying time of 55.68, ahead of Germany's Angelina Köhler and Belgium's Roos Vanotterdijk who swam the second and third fastest times of 56.49 and 56.66, respectively. 2024 Olympic finalist Louise Hansson of Sweden did not qualify.

| Rank | Heat | Lane | Name | Nationality | Time | Notes |
|---|---|---|---|---|---|---|
| 1 | 6 | 4 | Gretchen Walsh | United States | 55.68 | Q |
| 2 | 6 | 5 | Angelina Köhler | Germany | 56.49 | Q |
| 3 | 6 | 6 | Roos Vanotterdijk | Belgium | 56.66 | Q, NR |
| 4 | 4 | 5 | Mizuki Hirai | Japan | 56.81 | Q |
| 5 | 6 | 3 | Yu Yiting | China | 56.83 | Q |
| 6 | 5 | 5 | Alexandria Perkins | Australia | 56.89 | Q |
| 7 | 4 | 4 | Zhang Yufei | China | 57.11 | Q |
| 8 | 5 | 2 | Daria Klepikova | Neutral Athlete B | 57.29 | Q |
| 9 | 6 | 2 | Erin Gallagher | South Africa | 57.48 | Q |
| 10 | 5 | 6 | Tessa Giele | Netherlands | 57.56 | Q |
| 11 | 6 | 7 | Lily Price | Australia | 57.61 | Q |
| 12 | 4 | 6 | Anna Ntountounaki | Greece | 57.62 | Q |
| 13 | 4 | 3 | Rikako Ikee | Japan | 57.75 | Q |
| 14 | 4 | 7 | Keanna Macinnes | Great Britain | 57.90 | Q |
| 15 | 6 | 8 | Helena Rosendahl Bach | Denmark | 58.15 | Q |
| 16 | 5 | 7 | Costanza Cocconcelli | Italy | 58.31 | Q |
| 17 | 6 | 0 | Arielle Hayon | Israel | 58.35 | |
| 18 | 5 | 1 | Sara Junevik | Sweden | 58.46 | |
| 19 | 4 | 1 | Anastasiya Kuliashova | Neutral Athlete A | 58.52 | |
| 19 | 6 | 1 | Lilou Ressencourt | France | 58.52 | |
| 21 | 4 | 2 | Georgia Damasioti | Greece | 58.60 | |
| 22 | 5 | 3 | Louise Hansson | Sweden | 58.64 | |
| 23 | 5 | 8 | Iris Julia Berger | Austria | 58.91 | |
| 24 | 4 | 8 | Amina Kajtaz Pinjo | Croatia | 59.18 | |
| 24 | 4 | 9 | Quah Jing Wen | Singapore | 59.18 | |
| 26 | 3 | 4 | Brooklyn Douthwright | Canada | 59.25 | |
| 27 | 3 | 5 | Zuzanna Famulok | Poland | 59.28 | |
| 28 | 4 | 0 | Stephanie Balduccini | Brazil | 59.72 | |
| 29 | 6 | 9 | Kim Do-yeon | South Korea | 59.78 | |
| 30 | 3 | 6 | Miranda Grana | Mexico | 59.86 | |
| 31 | 5 | 9 | Barbora Janíčková | Czech Republic | 59.97 | |
| 32 | 3 | 7 | Lismar Lyon | Venezuela | 1:00.19 | |
| 33 | 5 | 0 | Yeung Hoi Ching | Hong Kong | 1:00.31 | |
| 34 | 3 | 1 | Liu Pei-yin | Chinese Taipei | 1:00.90 | |
| 35 | 3 | 3 | Napatsawan Jaritkla | Thailand | 1:01.00 | |
| 36 | 3 | 0 | Alexia Sotomayor | Peru | 1:01.38 | |
| 37 | 2 | 3 | Emma Sabando | Ecuador | 1:01.60 | |
| 38 | 3 | 8 | Jessica Calderbank | Jamaica | 1:01.62 | |
| 39 | 2 | 5 | Imara Thorpe | Kenya | 1:01.64 | |
| 40 | 3 | 9 | Varsenik Manucharyan | Armenia | 1:01.68 | |
| 41 | 2 | 4 | Jóhanna Elín Guðmundsdóttir | Iceland | 1:01.70 | |
| 42 | 2 | 6 | Anje Van As | Zimbabwe | 1:02.63 | |
| 43 | 3 | 2 | Sofia Spodarenko | Kazakhstan | 1:02.88 | |
| 44 | 2 | 8 | Ashley Calderon | Honduras | 1:03.45 | |
| 44 | 2 | 1 | María Schutzmeier | Nicaragua | 1:03.45 | |
| 46 | 2 | 2 | Lia Lima | Angola | 1:03.86 | |
| 47 | 1 | 5 | Davia Richardson | Belize | 1:04.29 | |
| 48 | 2 | 7 | Paige Schendelaar-Kemp | Samoa | 1:05.21 | |
| 49 | 1 | 0 | Mia Laban | Cook Islands | 1:05.41 | |
| 50 | 1 | 4 | Cheang Weng Chi | Macau | 1:05.42 | |
| 51 | 2 | 0 | Asma Lefalher | Bahrain | 1:05.53 | NR |
| 52 | 2 | 9 | Aleka Persaud | Guyana | 1:06.49 | |
| 53 | 1 | 3 | Amaya Bollinger | Guam | 1:06.93 | |
| 54 | 1 | 1 | Honey Nan | Myanmar | 1:09.89 | |
| 55 | 1 | 7 | Naekeisha Louis | Saint Lucia | 1:12.38 | |
| 56 | 1 | 8 | Ony Andrianaivo | Madagascar | 1:13.31 | |
| 57 | 1 | 6 | Amazya Macrooy | Suriname | 1:14.69 | |
| 58 | 1 | 2 | Meral Latheef | Maldives | 1:16.73 | |
| | 5 | 4 | Torri Huske | United States | Did not start | |

== Semifinals ==
The semifinals took place on 27 July at 19:13. Russia's Daria Klepikova, representing the Neutral Athletes B team in this competition, swam 56.42 to break her country's national record.

| Rank | Heat | Lane | Name | Nationality | Time | Notes |
|---|---|---|---|---|---|---|
| 1 | 2 | 4 | Gretchen Walsh | United States | 56.07 | Q |
| 1 | 2 | 5 | Roos Vanotterdijk | Belgium | 56.07 | Q, NR |
| 3 | 1 | 3 | Alexandria Perkins | Australia | 56.19 | Q |
| 4 | 1 | 6 | Daria Klepikova | Neutral Athlete B | 56.42 | Q, NR (Note: National record for Russia, through she was representing the Neutral Athletes B team.) |
| 5 | 1 | 4 | Angelina Köhler | Germany | 56.75 | Q |
| 6 | 2 | 6 | Zhang Yufei | China | 56.84 | Q |
| 7 | 1 | 5 | Mizuki Hirai | Japan | 56.86 | Q |
| 8 | 2 | 3 | Yu Yiting | China | 57.11 | Q |
| 9 | 1 | 2 | Tessa Giele | Netherlands | 57.17 | |
| 10 | 1 | 7 | Anna Ntountounaki | Greece | 57.32 | |
| 11 | 2 | 7 | Lily Price | Australia | 57.58 | |
| 12 | 1 | 1 | Keanna Macinnes | Great Britain | 57.67 | |
| 13 | 2 | 2 | Erin Gallagher | South Africa | 57.68 | |
| 14 | 2 | 1 | Rikako Ikee | Japan | 57.89 | |
| 15 | 1 | 8 | Costanza Cocconcelli | Italy | 57.94 | |
| 16 | 2 | 8 | Helena Rosendahl Bach | Denmark | 57.98 | |

== Final ==
The final took place on 28 July on 19:10.

| Rank | Lane | Name | Nationality | Time | Notes |
|---|---|---|---|---|---|
| 1st place, gold medalist(s) | 4 | Gretchen Walsh | United States | 54.73 | CR |
| 2nd place, silver medalist(s) | 5 | Roos Vanotterdijk | Belgium | 55.84 | NR |
| 3rd place, bronze medalist(s) | 3 | Alexandria Perkins | Australia | 56.33 | |
| 4 | 7 | Zhang Yufei | China | 56.47 | |
| 5 | 6 | Daria Klepikova | Neutral Athlete B | 56.53 | |
| 6 | 2 | Angelina Köhler | Germany | 56.57 | |
| 7 | 1 | Mizuki Hirai | Japan | 56.83 | |
| 8 | 8 | Yu Yiting | China | 57.36 | |
