= Swimming at the 2025 World Aquatics Championships – Women's 100 metre backstroke =

Women's 100 metre backstroke at the 2025 World Aquatics Championships
- Venue: World Aquatics Championships Arena
- Location: Singapore Sports Hub, Kallang
- Dates: 28 July (heats and semifinals); 29 July (final)
- Competitors: 56 from 49 nations
- Winning time: 57.16

Medalists
gold medal	Kaylee McKeown	Australia
silver medal	Regan Smith	United States
bronze medal	Katharine Berkoff	United States

The women's 100 metre backstroke event at the 2025 World Aquatics Championships was held from 28 to 29 July 2025 at the World Aquatics Championships Arena at the Singapore Sports Hub in Kallang, Singapore.

== Background ==
The event is expected to center on the rivalry between Regan Smith of the United States and Kaylee McKeown of Australia, who have dominated the event since 2020. The two have alternated ownership of the world record, with Smith currently holding it at 57.13 from the 2024 U.S. Olympic Trials, while McKeown won Olympic gold in Paris with 57.33. Both have produced sub-58 times this season, Smith leading with 57.46 and McKeown at 57.65. Other contenders include Katharine Berkoff of the United States, a 2024 Olympic bronze medalist with a 57.83 best, and Canada’s Kylie Masse, a consistent international medalist with a 57.70 lifetime best. Several rising athletes, including Carmen Weiler of Spain and Taylor Ruck of Canada, may also challenge for podium positions.

== Qualification ==
Each National Federation was permitted to enter a maximum of two qualified athletes in each individual event, but they could do so only if both of them had attained the "A" standard qualification time. For this event, the "A" standard qualification time was 1:00.46. Federations could enter one athlete into the event if they met the "B" standard qualification time. For this event, the "B" standard qualification time was 1:02.58. Athletes could also enter the event if they had met an "A" or "B" standard in a different event and their Federation had not entered anyone else. Additional considerations applied to Federations who had few swimmers enter through the standard qualification times. Federations in this category could at least enter two men and two women to the competition, all of whom could enter into up to two events.

Top 10 fastest qualification times
Swimmer	Country	Time	Competition
Regan Smith	United States	57.13	2024 United States Olympic Trials
Kaylee McKeown	Australia	57.33	2024 Summer Olympics
Katharine Berkoff	United States	57.83	2024 United States Olympic Trials
Mollie O'Callaghan	Australia	57.88	2024 Australian Olympic Trials
Kylie Masse	Canada	57.94	2024 Canadian Olympic Trials
Iona Anderson	Australia	58.43	2024 Australian Olympic Trials
Kennedy Noble	United States	58.55	2024 United States Olympic Trials
Leah Shackley	United States	58.60	2025 United States Championships
Claire Curzan	United States	58.60	2025 United States Championships
Emma Terebo	France	58.79	2024 French Elite

== Records ==
Prior to the competition, the existing world and championship records were as follows.

World record	Regan Smith (USA)	57.13	Indianapolis, United States	18 June 2024
Competition record	Kaylee McKeown (AUS)	57.53	Fukuoka, Japan	25 July 2023

The following record was established during the competition:

Date	Event	Swimmer	Nation	Time	Record
29 July	Final	Kaylee McKeown	Australia	57.16	CR

== Heats ==
The heats took place on 28 July at 10:02.

Rank	Heat	Lane	Swimmer	Nation	Time	Notes
1	6	4	Regan Smith	United States	58.20	Q
2	4	4	Katharine Berkoff	United States	58.55	Q
3	5	4	Kaylee McKeown	Australia	58.57	Q
4	5	2	Peng Xuwei	China	59.34	Q
5	4	3	Wan Letian	China	59.35	Q
6	5	3	Roos Vanotterdijk	Belgium	59.37	Q
7	4	6	Mary-Ambre Moluh	France	59.47	Q
8	4	5	Taylor Ruck	Canada	59.55	Q
9	6	5	Kylie Masse	Canada	59.71	Q
10	6	2	Hannah Fredericks	Australia	59.80	Q
11	5	5	Carmen Weiler	Spain	59.86	Q
11	6	3	Marrit Steenbergen	Netherlands	59.86	Q
13	5	8	Anastasiya Shkurdai	Neutral Athletes A	1:00.11	Q
14	5	6	Pauline Mahieu	France	1:00.48	Q
15	5	1	Kim Seung-won	South Korea	1:00.51	Q
16	4	7	Alina Gaifutdinova	Neutral Athletes B	1:00.56	Q
17	4	2	Adela Piskorska	Poland	1:00.72	
18	6	6	Danielle Hill	Ireland	1:00.79	
19	6	7	Maaike de Waard	Netherlands	1:00.85	
20	5	7	Miranda Grana	Mexico	1:01.10	
21	4	1	Anita Gastaldi	Italy	1:01.20	
22	6	1	Hanna Rosvall	Sweden	1:01.23	
23	6	0	Camila Rebelo	Portugal	1:01.38	
24	3	6	Gabriela Georgieva	Bulgaria	1:01.42	
25	4	0	Aviv Barzelay	Israel	1:01.70	
26	4	8	Lora Komoróczy	Hungary	1:01.80	
27	5	0	Schastine Tabor	Denmark	1:01.83	
28	6	9	Fanny Teijonsalo	Finland	1:01.85	
29	6	8	Amber George	New Zealand	1:02.16	
30	4	9	Xeniya Ignatova	Kazakhstan	1:02.32	
31	5	9	Justine Murdock	Lithuania	1:02.67	
32	3	3	Maari Randväli	Estonia	1:02.75	
33	3	7	Cindy Cheung	Hong Kong	1:02.79	
34	3	4	Levenia Sim	Singapore	1:02.80	
35	3	1	Andrea Berrino	Argentina	1:03.29	
36	3	2	Zuri Ferguson	Trinidad and Tobago	1:03.56	
37	3	0	Laurent Estrada	Cuba	1:03.72	
38	3	5	Janja Šegel	Slovenia	1:04.10	
39	2	4	Elizabeth Jiménez	Dominican Republic	1:04.32	
40	3	8	Natalia Zaiteva	Moldova	1:04.72	
41	2	5	Saovanee Boonamphai	Thailand	1:04.87	
42	3	9	Abril Aunchayna	Uruguay	1:05.15	
43	2	6	Anishta Teeluck	Mauritius	1:05.20	
44	2	8	Taline Mourad	Lebanon	1:06.21	
45	2	3	Carolina Cermelli	Panama	1:06.25	
46	2	2	Amani Al-Obaidly	Bahrain	1:06.57	
47	2	9	Emilia Sandoval	Guatemala	1:06.68	
48	1	4	Minagi Rupesinghe	Sri Lanka	1:06.91	
49	2	1	Lara Giménez	Paraguay	1:06.95	
50	2	7	Enkh-Amgalangiin Ariuntamir	Mongolia	1:07.53	
51	1	5	Aynura Primova	Turkmenistan	1:08.05	NR
52	1	6	Parizod Abdukarimova	Uzbekistan	1:08.48	
53	1	3	Kaila Dacruz	Cape Verde	1:09.06	
54	1	7	Bjarta í Lágabø	Iceland	1:09.15	
55	2	0	Erina Idrizaj	Kosovo	1:09.65	
56	1	2	Amna Thazkiyah Mirsaad	Maldives	1:13.49	NR

== Semifinals ==
The semifinals took place on 28 July at 19:53.

Rank	Heat	Lane	Swimmer	Nation	Time	Notes
1	2	4	Regan Smith	United States	58.21	Q
2	2	5	Kaylee McKeown	Australia	58.44	Q
3	2	2	Kylie Masse	Canada	58.66	Q
4	1	4	Katharine Berkoff	United States	58.79	Q
5	1	6	Taylor Ruck	Canada	59.18	Q
6	1	5	Peng Xuwei	China	59.19	Q
7	2	6	Mary-Ambre Moluh	France	59.35	Q
8	1	1	Pauline Mahieu	France	59.56	SO
8	2	3	Wan Letian	China	59.56	SO
10	1	3	Roos Vanotterdijk	Belgium	59.63	
11	1	2	Hannah Fredericks	Australia	59.73	
12	2	7	Carmen Weiler	Spain	59.92	
13	1	8	Alina Gaifutdinova	Neutral Athletes B	59.93	
14	1	7	Marrit Steenbergen	Netherlands	59.94	
15	2	1	Anastasiya Shkurdai	Neutral Athletes A	1:00.46	
16	2	8	Kim Seung-won	South Korea	1:00.54	

=== Swim-off ===
The swim-off was started on 28 July at 20:39.

Rank	Lane	Name	Nationality	Time	Notes
1	4	Pauline Mahieu	France	59.28	Q
2	5	Wan Letian	China	1:00.86	

== Final ==
The final took place on 29 July at 19:50.

Rank	Lane	Name	Nationality	Time	Notes
1st place, gold medalist(s)	5	Kaylee McKeown	Australia	57.16	CR, OC
2nd place, silver medalist(s)	4	Regan Smith	United States	57.35	
3rd place, bronze medalist(s)	6	Katharine Berkoff	United States	58.15	
4	3	Kylie Masse	Canada	58.42	
5	7	Peng Xuwei	China	59.10	
6	8	Pauline Mahieu	France	59.48	
7	2	Taylor Ruck	Canada	59.59	
8	1	Mary-Ambre Moluh	France	59.60	
