= Swimming at the 2025 World Aquatics Championships – Women's 50 metre backstroke =

Women's 50 metre backstroke at the 2025 World Aquatics Championships
- Venue: World Aquatics Championships Arena
- Location: Singapore Sports Hub, Kallang
- Dates: 30 July (heats and semifinals); 31 July (final)
- Competitors: 63 from 55 nations
- Winning time: 27.08

Medalists
gold medal	Katharine Berkoff	United States
silver medal	Regan Smith	United States
bronze medal	Wan Letian	China

The women's 50 metre backstroke event at the 2025 World Aquatics Championships was held from 30 to 31 July 2025 at the World Aquatics Championships Arena at the Singapore Sports Hub in Kallang, Singapore.

== Qualification ==
Each National Federation was permitted to enter a maximum of two qualified athletes in each individual event, but they could do so only if both of them had attained the "A" standard qualification time. For this event, the "A" standard qualification time was 24.86. Federations could enter one athlete into the event if they met the "B" standard qualification time. For this event, the "B" standard qualification time was 25.73. Athletes could also enter the event if they had met an "A" or "B" standard in a different event and their Federation had not entered anyone else. Additional considerations applied to Federations who had few swimmers enter through the standard qualification times. Federations in this category could at least enter two men and two women to the competition, all of whom could enter into up to two events.

== Records ==
Prior to the competition, the existing world and championship records were as follows.

World record	Kaylee McKeown (AUS)	26.86	Budapest, Hungary	20 October 2023
Competition record	Zhao Jing (CHN)	27.06	Rome, Italy	30 July 2009

== Heats ==
The heats took place on 30 July at 10:02.

Rank	Heat	Lane	Swimmer	Nation	Time	Notes
1	6	4	Kylie Masse	Canada	27.46	Q
2	6	6	Alina Gaifutdinova	Neutral Athletes B	27.57	Q
3	6	3	Wan Letian	China	27.59	Q
3	7	4	Katharine Berkoff	United States	27.59	Q
5	7	5	Regan Smith	United States	27.67	Q
6	6	5	Analia Pigrée	France	27.73	Q
7	7	2	Kim Seung-won	South Korea	27.75	Q
8	7	6	Ingrid Wilm	Canada	27.76	Q
9	6	7	Maaike de Waard	Netherlands	27.82	Q
10	5	6	Danielle Hill	Ireland	27.84	Q
11	7	8	Fanny Teijonsalo	Finland	27.85	Q
12	5	2	Roos Vanotterdijk	Belgium	27.87	Q
13	5	5	Mary-Ambre Moluh	France	27.93	Q
14	7	7	Theodora Drakou	Greece	27.94	Q
15	5	3	Anastasia Gorbenko	Israel	27.95	Q
16	5	4	Lauren Cox	Great Britain	27.97	S/off
16	6	9	Celia Pulido	Mexico	27.97	S/off, NR
18	6	0	Hannah Fredericks	Australia	28.03	
19	7	1	Lu Xingchen	China	28.10	
20	6	8	Miki Takahashi	Japan	28.12	
20	7	3	Tessa Giele	Netherlands	28.12	
22	6	2	Carmen Weiler	Spain	28.14	
23	5	9	Olivia Nel	South Africa	28.23	
24	7	0	Julie Kepp Jensen	Denmark	28.32	
25	5	7	Amber George	New Zealand	28.54	
26	6	1	Adela Piskorska	Poland	28.56	
27	5	1	Lora Komoróczy	Hungary	28.57	
27	7	9	Hanna Rosvall	Sweden	28.57	
29	5	8	Savannah-Eve Martin	New Zealand	28.74	
30	4	4	Andrea Berrino	Argentina	29.05	
31	4	6	Saovanee Boonamphai	Thailand	29.17	
32	4	7	Chang Ya-jia	Chinese Taipei	29.25	
33	4	3	Xeniya Ignatova	Kazakhstan	29.28	
34	4	5	Justine Murdock	Lithuania	29.37	
35	4	9	Oumy Diop	Senegal	29.38	NR
36	4	1	Levenia Sim	Singapore	29.40	
37	5	0	Stephanie Au	Hong Kong	29.45	
38	4	0	Amel Melih	Algeria	29.47	
39	4	2	Maari Randväli	Estonia	29.53	
40	4	8	Zuri Ferguson	Trinidad and Tobago	29.81	
41	3	6	Laurent Estrada	Cuba	30.24	
42	3	4	Abril Aunchayna	Uruguay	30.43	
43	1	6	Parizod Abdukarimova	Uzbekistan	30.57	
44	3	5	Amani Al-Obaidly	Bahrain	30.67	
45	3	3	Hana Beiqi	Kosovo	30.72	
46	3	8	Antsa Rabejaona	Madagascar	30.78	
47	3	2	Enkh-Amgalangiin Ariuntamir	Mongolia	30.93	
48	3	7	Lara Giménez	Paraguay	31.01	
49	3	9	Sharmeen Mohd Mharvin	Brunei	31.19	
50	2	4	Aynura Primova	Turkmenistan	31.27	
51	2	6	Melodi Saleshando	Botswana	31.65	
52	2	1	Piper Raho	Northern Mariana Islands	31.76	NR
53	1	5	Bjarta í Lágabø	Faroe Islands	31.79	
54	1	4	Kaila Dacruz	Cape Verde	32.05	
55	2	5	Chanchakriya Kheun	Cambodia	32.12	
56	3	0	Aaliyah Palestrini	Seychelles	32.15	
57	3	1	Nubia Adjei	Ghana	32.23	
58	2	2	Marseleima Moss	Fiji	32.34	
59	2	3	Kaiya Brown	Samoa	33.48	
60	2	9	Lana Alrasheed	Saudi Arabia	33.87	NR
61	2	8	Lois Eliora Irishura	Burundi	34.49	
62	2	7	Joanna Chen	Papua New Guinea	34.80	
63	2	0	Aragsan Mugabo	Rwanda	36.65	
	1	3	Hazel Alamy	Sierra Leone	Did not start	

=== Swim-off ===
The swim-off was started on 30 July at 12:02.

Rank	Lane	Name	Nationality	Time	Notes
1	4	Lauren Cox	Great Britain	27.64	Q
2	5	Celia Pulido	Mexico	28.30	

== Semifinals ==
The semifinals took place on 30 July at 19:38.

Rank	Heat	Lane	Swimmer	Nation	Time	Notes
1	2	3	Regan Smith	United States	27.23	Q
2	1	8	Lauren Cox	Great Britain	27.26	Q
3	1	5	Katharine Berkoff	United States	27.34	Q
4	2	5	Wan Letian	China	27.44	Q
5	1	6	Ingrid Wilm	Canada	27.48	Q
6	2	4	Kylie Masse	Canada	27.50	Q
7	1	3	Analia Pigrée	France	27.52	Q
8	1	4	Alina Gaifutdinova	Neutral Athletes B	27.57	Q
9	2	1	Mary-Ambre Moluh	France	27.63	
10	2	8	Anastasia Gorbenko	Israel	27.65	
11	1	7	Roos Vanotterdijk	Belgium	27.67	NR
12	1	2	Danielle Hill	Ireland	27.71	
13	1	1	Theodora Drakou	Greece	27.75	NR
14	2	2	Maaike de Waard	Netherlands	27.87	
15	2	6	Kim Seung-won	South Korea	27.95	
16	2	7	Fanny Teijonsalo	Finland	28.00	

== Final ==
The final took place on 31 July at 20:00.

Rank	Lane	Name	Nationality	Time	Notes
1st place, gold medalist(s)	3	Katharine Berkoff	United States	27.08	
2nd place, silver medalist(s)	4	Regan Smith	United States	27.25	
3rd place, bronze medalist(s)	6	Wan Letian	China	27.30	
4	7	Kylie Masse	Canada	27.33	
5	5	Lauren Cox	Great Britain	27.36	
6	8	Alina Gaifutdinova	Neutral Athletes B	27.44	
7	1	Analia Pigrée	France	27.47	
8	2	Ingrid Wilm	Canada	27.56	
