= France at the 2025 World Aquatics Championships =

- Flag of France
- World Aquatics code: FRA
- National federation: French Swimming Federation
- Website: www.ffnatation.fr (in French)

in Singapore
- Competitors: 68 in 6 sports
- Medals Ranked 7th: Gold 4 Silver 1 Bronze 5 Total 10

World Aquatics Championships appearances
- 1973; 1975; 1978; 1982; 1986; 1991; 1994; 1998; 2001; 2003; 2005; 2007; 2009; 2011; 2013; 2015; 2017; 2019; 2022; 2023; 2024; 2025

France competed at the 2025 World Aquatics Championships in Singapore from July 11 to August 3, 2025.

== Medalists ==
Medal	Name	Sport	Event	Date
1st place, gold medalist(s)	Maxime Grousset	Swimming	Men's 50 metre butterfly	28 July 2025
1st place, gold medalist(s)	Léon Marchand	Swimming	Men's 200 metre individual medley	31 July 2025
1st place, gold medalist(s)	Maxime Grousset	Swimming	Men's 100 metre butterfly	2 August 2025
1st place, gold medalist(s)	Léon Marchand	Swimming	Men's 400 metre individual medley	3 August 2025
2nd place, silver medalist(s)	Yohann Ndoye-Brouard; Léon Marchand; Maxime Grousset; Yann Le Goff; Jérémie Delbois; Clément Secchi	Swimming	Men's 4 × 100 metre medley relay	3 August 2025
3rd place, bronze medalist(s)	Marc-Antoine Olivier	Open water swimming	Men's 5 km	18 July 2025
3rd place, bronze medalist(s)	Marc-Antoine Olivier	Open water swimming	Men's 3 km knockout sprints	19 July 2025
3rd place, bronze medalist(s)	Yohann Ndoye-Brouard	Swimming	Men's 100 metre backstroke	29 July 2025
3rd place, bronze medalist(s)	Yohann Ndoye-Brouard	Swimming	Men's 200 metre backstroke	1 August 2025
3rd place, bronze medalist(s)	Maxime Grousset; Yann Le Goff; Marie Wattel; Béryl Gastaldello; Rafael Fente-Damers; Albane Cachot	Swimming	Mixed 4 × 100 metre freestyle relay	2 August 2025

== Competitors ==
The following is the list of competitors in the Championships.

Sport	Men	Women	Total
Artistic swimming	0	11	11
Diving	2	4	6
High diving	1	1	2
Open water swimming	4	3	7
Swimming	18	9	27
Water polo	0	15	15
Total	25	43	68

== Artistic swimming ==
Women

Athlete	Event	Preliminaries		Final	
Athlete	Event	Points	Rank	Points	Rank
Romane Temessek	Solo technical routine	236.9400	9 Q	239.7925	8
Anastasia Bayandina; Romane Lunel	Duet technical routine	284.6158	6 Q	254.9667	11
Laëlys Alavez; Romane Lunel	Duet free routine	252.6575	5 Q	257.9033	5

Mixed

Athlete	Event	Preliminaries		Final	
Athlete	Event	Points	Rank	Points	Rank
Laëlys Alavez; Angéline Bertinelli; Jeanne Clair; Ambre Esnault; Claudia Janvier; Romane Lunel; Romane Temessek; Lou Thuillier	Team technical routine	249.3725	8 Q	270.3816	8
Laëlys Alavez; Anastasia Bayandina; Angéline Bertinelli; Ambre Esnault; Laura González; Claudia Janvier; Romane Lunel; Eve Planeix	Team acrobatic routine	190.5908	10 Q	211.2587	6

== Diving ==
Men

Athlete	Event	Preliminaries		Semifinals		Final	
Athlete	Event	Points	Rank	Points	Rank	Points	Rank
Gwendal Bisch	1 m springboard	332.55	21	—		Did not advance	
Gwendal Bisch	3 m springboard	354.70	30	Did not advance			
Jules Bouyer	1 m springboard	370.15	5 Q	—		390.15	5
Jules Bouyer	3 m springboard	404.80	9 Q	407.75	9 Q	478.30	5
Gwendal Bisch; Jules Bouyer	3 m synchro springboard	370.05	9	—		Did not advance	

Women

Athlete	Event	Preliminaries		Semifinals		Final	
Athlete	Event	Points	Rank	Points	Rank	Points	Rank
Jade Gillet	10 m platform	246.35	24	Did not advance			
Naïs Gillet	1 m springboard	251.45	7 Q	—		233.10	12
Naïs Gillet	3 m springboard	259.55	22	Did not advance			
Emily Hallifax	10 m platform	228.10	30	Did not advance			
Juliette Landi	1 m springboard	209.75	35	—		Did not advance	
Juliette Landi	3 m springboard	234.35	32	Did not advance			

== High diving ==
Athlete	Event	Points	Rank
Gary Hunt	Men's high diving	375.30	6
Madeleine Bayon	Women's high diving	232.90	14

== Open water swimming ==
Men

Athlete	Event	Heat		Semi-final		Final	
Athlete	Event	Time	Rank	Time	Rank	Time	Rank
Logan Fontaine	Men's 3 km knockout sprints	17:08.9	6 Q	11:30.8	6 Q	6:07.2	6
Marc-Antoine Olivier	Men's 3 km knockout sprints	17:05.0	4 Q	11:29.2	4 Q	5:51.1	3rd place, bronze medalist(s)
Marc-Antoine Olivier	Men's 5 km	—				57:30.4	3rd place, bronze medalist(s)
Marc-Antoine Olivier	Men's 10 km	—				Did not finish	
Sacha Velly	Men's 5 km	—				58:37.5	19
Jules Wallart	Men's 10 km	—				2:05:46.9	26

Women

Athlete	Event	Heat		Semi-final		Final	
Athlete	Event	Time	Rank	Time	Rank	Time	Rank
Clémence Coccordano	Women's 3 km knockout sprints	18:35.5	3 Q	12:13.1	11	Did not advance	
Inès Delacroix	Women's 5 km	—				1:03:10.5	9
Inès Delacroix	Women's 10 km	—				2:09:44.7	12
Caroline Jouisse	Women's 3 km knockout sprints	18:35.8	5 Q	12:23.7	18	Did not advance	
Caroline Jouisse	Women's 5 km	—				1:04:06.5	12
Caroline Jouisse	Women's 10 km	—				Did not finish	

Mixed

Athlete	Event	Time	Rank
Clémence Coccordano; Marc-Antoine Olivier; Inès Delacroix; Logan Fontaine	Team relay	1:09:24.7	4

== Swimming ==
France entered 27 swimmers.

Men

Athlete	Event	Heat		Semi-final		Final	
Athlete	Event	Time	Rank	Time	Rank	Time	Rank
David Aubry	400 m freestyle	3:49.13	23	—		Did not advance	
David Aubry	800 m freestyle	7:54.83	16	—		Did not advance	
David Aubry	1500 m freestyle	15:03.32	11	—		Did not advance	
Nikita Baez	50 m freestyle	22.06	22	Did not advance			
Rafael Fente-Damers	100 m freestyle	48.33	16 Q	48.38	16	Did not advance	
Pierre Goudeneche	50 m breaststroke	Disqualified		Did not advance			
Maxime Grousset	50 m freestyle	Did not start		Did not advance			
Maxime Grousset	100 m freestyle	47.84	5 Q	47.39	5 Q	47.59	7
Maxime Grousset	50 m butterfly	22.74	1 Q	22.61 NR	1 Q	22.48 NR	1st place, gold medalist(s)
Maxime Grousset	100 m butterfly	51.36	11 Q	50.25	3 Q	49.62 ER	1st place, gold medalist(s)
Antoine Herlem	200 m backstroke	1:56.58	8 Q	1:57.45	16	Did not advance	
Damien Joly	1500 m freestyle	14:51.06	8 Q	—		15:19.06	8
Léon Marchand	200 m individual medley	1:57.63	1 Q	1:52.69 WR	1 Q	1:53.68	1st place, gold medalist(s)
Léon Marchand	400 m individual medley	4:13.19	7 Q	—		4:04.73	1st place, gold medalist(s)
Yohann Ndoye-Brouard	100 m backstroke	52.30	1 Q	52.47	7 Q	51.92 NR	3rd place, bronze medalist(s)
Yohann Ndoye-Brouard	200 m backstroke	1:56.82	13 Q	1:54.47 NR	2 Q	1:54.62	3rd place, bronze medalist(s)
Clément Secchi	100 m butterfly	51.58	16 Q	51.23	13	Did not advance	
Mewen Tomac	100 m backstroke	53.07	10 Q	53.15	12	Did not advance	
Antoine Viquerat	50 m breaststroke	27.18	14 Q	26.93 NR; 27.27	8 S/off; 2	Did not advance	
Rafael Fente-Damers; Nans Mazellier; Ethan Dumesnil; Yann Le Goff	4 × 100 m freestyle relay	3:12.929	11	—		Did not advance	
Roman Fuchs; Yann Le Goff; Rafael Fente-Damers; Léon Marchand; Corentin Pouillart (heat)	4 × 200 m freestyle relay	7:06.88	8 Q	—		7:03.69	6
Yohann Ndoye-Brouard; Léon Marchand; Maxime Grousset; Yann Le Goff; Jérémie Delbois (heat); Clément Secchi (heat)	4 × 100 m medley relay	3:32.35	7 Q	—		3:27.96 NR	2nd place, silver medalist(s)

Women

Athlete	Event	Heat		Semi-final		Final	
Athlete	Event	Time	Rank	Time	Rank	Time	Rank
Béryl Gastaldello	50 m freestyle	24.53	6 Q	24.64	13	Did not advance	
Béryl Gastaldello	100 m freestyle	53.56	5 Q	53.36	6 Q	53.30	6
Anastasiya Kirpichnikova	400 m freestyle	4:13.92	19	—		Did not advance	
Anastasiya Kirpichnikova	800 m freestyle	8:28.97	11	—		Did not advance	
Anastasiya Kirpichnikova	1500 m freestyle	16:06.97	7 Q	—		15:57.40	5
Pauline Mahieu	100 m backstroke	1:00.48	14 Q	59.56; 59.28	8 S/off; 1 Q	59.48	6
Pauline Mahieu	200 m backstroke	2:12.33	24	Did not advance			
Mary-Ambre Moluh	50 m backstroke	27.93	13 Q	27.63	9	Did not advance	
Mary-Ambre Moluh	100 m backstroke	59.47	7 Q	59.35	7 Q	59.60	8
Analia Pigrée	50 m freestyle	24.93	17	Did not advance			
Analia Pigrée	50 m backstroke	27.73	6 Q	27.52	6 Q	27.47	7
Lilou Ressencourt	100 m butterfly	58.52	19	Did not advance			
Lilou Ressencourt	200 m butterfly	2:09.86	13 Q	2:10.87	15	Did not advance	
Béryl Gastaldello; Marina Jehl; Albane Cachot; Marie Wattel	4 × 100 m freestyle relay	3:35.76	5 Q	—		3:34.62 NR	5

Mixed

Athlete	Event	Heat		Final	
Athlete	Event	Time	Rank	Time	Rank
Maxime Grousset; Yann Le Goff; Marie Wattel; Béryl Gastaldello; Rafael Fente-Damers (heat); Albane Cachot (heat)	4 × 100 m freestyle relay	3:24.21	2 Q	3:21.35 NR	3rd place, bronze medalist(s)
Mewen Tomac; Jérémie Delbois; Marie Wattel; Albane Cachot	4 × 100 m medley relay	3:44.31	9	Did not advance	

== Water polo ==
Summary

Team	Event	Group stage				Playoff	Quarterfinal	Semi-final	Final / BM	
Team	Event	Opposition Score	Opposition Score	Opposition Score	Rank	Opposition Score	Opposition Score	Opposition Score	Opposition Score	Rank
France	Women's tournament	Great Britain; L 9–12	Spain; L 6–23	South Africa; W 13–6	3 P/Off	Greece; L 9–23	—	China; L 6–18	Great Britain; L 9–14	12

=== Women's tournament ===
Team roster

The following is French roster.

Head coach: Lucas Heurtier

- 1 Pasiphaé Martineaud Peret GK
- 2 Lara Andres FP
- 3 Jade Boughrara FP
- 4 Elhyne Kilic-Pegourie FP
- 5 Erica Hardy FP
- 6 Lily Vernoux FP
- 7 Emma Duflos FP
- 8 Valentine Heurtaux FP
- 9 Ema Vernoux FP
- 10 Lou Jean-Michel FP
- 11 Tiziana Raspo FP
- 12 Camille Radosavljevic FP
- 13 Eszter Lefebvre GK
- 14 Arianna Banchi FP
- 15 Myriam Ouchache FP

Group play

Pos	Team	Pld	W	PSW	PSL	L	GF	GA	GD	Pts	Qualification
1	Spain	3	3	0	0	0	62	17	+45	9	Quarterfinals
2	Great Britain	3	2	0	0	1	31	28	+3	6	Playoffs
3	France	3	1	0	0	2	28	41	−13	3	Playoffs
4	South Africa	3	0	0	0	3	13	48	−35	0	13–16th place semifinals

Source: Omegatiming
Rules for classification: 1) points; 2) head-to-head points; 3) head-to-head goal difference; 4) head-to-head number of goals scored; 5) Goal difference.

11 July 2025; 13:45	Report	France	9–12	Great Britain	OCBC Aquatic Centre, Singapore; Referees: Alessia Ferrari (ITA), Megan Rose Perry (NZL)
11 July 2025; 13:45	Report	Score by quarters: 4–3, 0–3, 2–5, 3–1			OCBC Aquatic Centre, Singapore; Referees: Alessia Ferrari (ITA), Megan Rose Perry (NZL)
11 July 2025; 13:45	Report	Vernoux 4	Goals	Brown, Turner 3	OCBC Aquatic Centre, Singapore; Referees: Alessia Ferrari (ITA), Megan Rose Perry (NZL)

13 July 2025; 16:00	Report	Spain	23–6	France	OCBC Aquatic Centre, Singapore; Referees: Jennifer McCall (USA), Fiona Haigh (AUS)
13 July 2025; 16:00	Report	Score by quarters: 6–3, 5–2, 6–0, 6–1			OCBC Aquatic Centre, Singapore; Referees: Jennifer McCall (USA), Fiona Haigh (AUS)
13 July 2025; 16:00	Report	Ruiz 4	Goals	Vernoux 2	OCBC Aquatic Centre, Singapore; Referees: Jennifer McCall (USA), Fiona Haigh (AUS)

15 July 2025; 12:10	Report	South Africa	6–13	France	OCBC Aquatic Centre, Singapore; Referees: Megan Perry (NZL), Mihai Balanescu (ROU)
15 July 2025; 12:10	Report	Score by quarters: 1–4, 2–3, 3–3, 0–3			OCBC Aquatic Centre, Singapore; Referees: Megan Perry (NZL), Mihai Balanescu (ROU)
15 July 2025; 12:10	Report	Banks 2	Goals	Hardy, Heurtaux 3	OCBC Aquatic Centre, Singapore; Referees: Megan Perry (NZL), Mihai Balanescu (ROU)

Playoffs

17 July 2025; 19:10	Report	Greece	23–9	France	OCBC Aquatic Centre, Singapore; Referees: Dasch Barber (RSA), Marcella Braga (BRA)
17 July 2025; 19:10	Report	Score by quarters: 4–4, 4–3, 8–0, 7–2			OCBC Aquatic Centre, Singapore; Referees: Dasch Barber (RSA), Marcella Braga (BRA)
17 July 2025; 19:10	Report	Tricha 5	Goals	Heurtaux 4	OCBC Aquatic Centre, Singapore; Referees: Dasch Barber (RSA), Marcella Braga (BRA)

9–12th place semifinals

19 July 2025; 12:10	Report	China	18–6	France	OCBC Aquatic Centre, Singapore; Referees: Fiona Haigh (AUS), Germán Moller (ARG)
19 July 2025; 12:10	Report	Score by quarters: 2–2, 4–0, 7–2, 5–2			OCBC Aquatic Centre, Singapore; Referees: Fiona Haigh (AUS), Germán Moller (ARG)
19 July 2025; 12:10	Report	Yan S. 4	Goals	Vernoux 3	OCBC Aquatic Centre, Singapore; Referees: Fiona Haigh (AUS), Germán Moller (ARG)

Eleventh place game

21 July 2025; 09:00	Report	France	9–14	Great Britain	OCBC Aquatic Centre, Singapore; Referees: Stanko Ivanovski (MNE), Fiona Haigh (AUS)
21 July 2025; 09:00	Report	Score by quarters: 1–2, 3–4, 2–4, 3–4			OCBC Aquatic Centre, Singapore; Referees: Stanko Ivanovski (MNE), Fiona Haigh (AUS)
21 July 2025; 09:00	Report	Vernoux 3	Goals	Rogers, Turner 3	OCBC Aquatic Centre, Singapore; Referees: Stanko Ivanovski (MNE), Fiona Haigh (AUS)
