= Swimming at the 2025 World Aquatics Championships – Mixed 4 × 100 metre medley relay =

Mixed 4 × 100 metre medley relay at the 2025 World Aquatics Championships
- Venue: World Aquatics Championships Arena
- Location: Singapore Sports Hub, Kallang
- Dates: 30 July
- Competitors: 166 from 38 nations
- Teams: 38
- Winning time: 3:37.97

Medalists
gold medal	Miron Lifintsev; Kirill Prigoda; Daria Klepikova; Daria Trofimova; Danil Semianinov; Aleksandra Kuznetsova
silver medal	Xu Jiayu; Qin Haiyang; Zhang Yufei; Wu Qingfeng; Dong Zhihao; Yu Yiting; Cheng Yujie	China
bronze medal	Kylie Masse; Oliver Dawson; Joshua Liendo; Taylor Ruck; Ingrid Wilm; Brooklyn Douthwright	Canada

The mixed 4 × 100 metre medley relay at the 2025 World Aquatics Championships was held on 30 July 2025 at the World Aquatics Championships Arena at the Singapore Sports Hub in Kallang, Singapore.

== Background ==
The United States, the Olympic champions and world record holders at 3:37.43, were expected to test different relay orders than normal due to the absence of Ryan Murphy and Nic Fink. Their fastest possible combination of individual swimmers based on their performances at the 2025 National Championships added up to 3:38.58. China, having swum 3:37.55 to win silver at the 2024 Olympics, were expected to rely on Xu Jiayu, Qin Haiyang, and Pan Zhanle. Australia faced breaststroke depth issues following injuries, with Nash Wilkes replacing Zac Stubblety-Cook. Other potential finalists included Canada, France, the Netherlands, Great Britain, Italy, and the Neutral Athletes B team.

== Qualification ==
Each National Federation could enter one team in the relay. The team had to be composed of swimmers who were also competing in the individual events, along with relay only swimmers who had to have met a specific qualifying time for the corresponding stroke and distance they would be swimming in the relay. Federations were only allowed to enter two relay-only swimmers for each relay they entered, though they could also enter relay-only swimmers from other relays which did not count toward this limitation.

== Records ==
Prior to the competition, the existing world and championship records were as follows.

World record	United States	3:37.43	Paris, France	3 August 2024
Competition record	United States	3:38.56	Budapest, Hungary	26 July 2017

The following record was established during the competition:

Date	Event	Nation	Swimmers	Time	Record
30 July	Final	Neutral Athletes B	Miron Lifintsev (51.78); Kirill Prigoda (57.56); Daria Klepikova (55.97); Daria Trofimova (52.66)	3:37.97	CR

== Heats ==
The heats took place on 30 July at 11:36.

Rank	Heat	Lane	Nation	Swimmers	Time	Notes
1	4	7	Italy	Christian Bacico (52.68); Ludovico Viberti (58.67); Costanza Cocconcelli (57.71); Sara Curtis (53.13)	3:42.19	Q
2	3	3	Netherlands	Maaike de Waard (59.72); Caspar Corbeau (58.75); Nyls Korstanje (51.04); Milou van Wijk (53.05)	3:42.56	Q
3	3	4	China	Xu Jiayu (53.45); Dong Zhihao (58.74); Yu Yiting (57.16); Cheng Yujie (53.46)	3:42.81	Q
4	4	5	Australia	Hannah Fredericks (59.25); Nash Wilkes (59.76); Alexandria Perkins (56.80); Kai Taylor (47.30)	3:43.11	Q
5	4	3	Canada	Ingrid Wilm (59.34); Oliver Dawson (59.97); Joshua Liendo (49.85); Brooklyn Douthwright (54.31)	3:43.47	Q
6	3	6	Japan	Riku Matsuyama (53.95); Taku Taniguchii (59.46); Mizuki Hirai (56.58); Nagisa Ikemoto (53.58)	3:43.57	Q
7	2	9	Neutral Athletes B	Miron Lifintsev (52.08); Danil Semianinov (59.67); Daria Klepikova (57.65); Aleksandra Kuznetsova (54.74)	3:44.14	Q
8	3	1	Poland	Ksawery Masiuk (53.31); Dominika Sztandera (1:06.20); Jakub Majerski (50.99); Katarzyna Wasick (53.72)	3:44.22	Q, NR
9	3	5	France	Mewen Tomac (53.08); Jérémie Delbois (59.80); Marie Wattel (57.50); Albane Cachot (53.93)	3:44.31	
10	4	4	United States	Keaton Jones (54.20); Campbell McKean (59.07); Torri Huske (58.47); Simone Manuel (52.76)	3:44.50	
11	4	2	Germany	Vincent Passek (54.92); Lucas Matzerath (58.74); Angelina Köhler (57.12); Nina Holt (53.75)	3:44.53	
12	4	6	Great Britain	Katie Shanahan (1:00.70); Max Morgan (59.83); Edward Mildred (51.50); Freya Anderson (54.16)	3:46.19	
13	3	7	Sweden	Hanna Rosvall (1:01.22); Erik Persson (1:00.35); Louise Hansson (57.22); Robin Hanson (48.12)	3:46.91	
14	3	8	Spain	Estella Tonrath (1:01.11); Nil Cadevall (1:00.49); Arbidel González (52.73); María Daza (54.54)	3:48.87	
15	2	6	Mexico	Celia Pulido (1:00.97); Miguel de Lara (1:00.94); Miranda Grana (59.33); Andrés Dupont (48.10)	3:49.34	NR
16	4	1	Greece	Evangelos Makrygiannis (53.68); Savvas Thomoglou (1:00.73); Anna Ntountounaki (57.81); Artemis Vasilaki (57.25)	3:49.47	
17	2	5	Argentina	Ulises Saravia (54.41); Macarena Ceballos (1:06.87); Ulises Cazau (52.48); Andrea Berrino (57.60)	3:51.36	
18	3	0	South Africa	Pieter Coetze (53.01); Kaylene Corbett (1:08.05); Erin Gallagher (57.95); Matthew Caldwell (53.02)	3:52.03	
19	4	9	Hong Kong	Hayden Kwan (56.18); Adam Mak (1:00.69); Yeung Hoi Ching (1:01.08); Li Sum Yiu (54.92)	3:52.87	
20	4	0	Iceland	Guðmundur Leo Rafnsson (56.59); Einar Margeir Ágústsson (1:02.63); Jóhanna Elín Guðmundsdóttir (1:02.01); Snæfríður Jórunnardóttir (54.79)	3:56.02	
21	3	9	Singapore	Zackery Tay (57.38); Chan Chun Ho (1:02.29); Megan Yo (1:01.09); Quah Ting Wen (55.75)	3:56.51	
22	1	4	Aruba	Patrick Groters (56.97); Mikel Schreuders (1:02.15); Avigayle Tromp (1:03.57); Elisabeth Timmer (57.01)	3:59.70	NR
23	1	7	Dominican Republic	Elizabeth Jiménez (1:04.69); Josué Domínguez (1:03.01); Javier Núñez (54.97); María Alejandra Fernández (1:00.45)	4:03.12	
24	1	2	Mongolia	Enkh-Amgalangiin Ariuntamir (1:07.99); Enkhtöriin Erkhes (1:04.17); Batbayaryn Enkhkhüslen (1:03.32); Batbayaryn Enkhtamir (50.13)	4:05.61	
25	2	3	Uganda	Kirabo Namutebi (1:09.52); Tendo Mukalazi (1:06.78); Jesse Ssuubi Ssengonzi (53.55); Gloria Muzito (55.80)	4:05.65	NR
26	1	3	Armenia	Varsenik Manucharyan (1:08.36); Ashot Chakhoyan (1:03.52); Yeva Karapetyan (1:03.58); Levon Kocharyan (50.99)	4:06.45	NR
27	2	7	Kenya	Imara Thorpe (1:07.27); Haniel Kudwoli (1:05.51); Stephen Nyoike (57.91); Sara Mose (57.03)	4:07.72	NR
28	1	1	Macau	Cheang Weng Chi (1:11.30); Chao Man Hou (1:02.63); Lam Chi Chong (57.17); Chen Pui Lam (59.18)	4:10.28	
29	1	8	Faroe Islands	Bjarta í Lágabø (1:09.78); Lea Højsted (1:14.19); Isak Brisenfeldt (56.75); Liggjas Joensen (52.08)	4:12.80	
30	2	4	Ghana	Nubia Adjei (1:13.61); Harry Stacey (1:06.62); Abeiku Jackson (55.04); Joselle Mensah (58.50)	4:13.77	
31	1	9	Samoa	Kokoro Frost (1:02.06); Johann Stickland (1:11.49); Paige Schendelaar-Kemp (1:05.81); Kaiya Brown (1:04.86)	4:24.22	
32	1	0	Madagascar	Francky Ramiakatrarivo (1:05.51); Jonathan Raharvel (1:03.96); Ony Andrianaivo (1:14.78); Antsa Rabejaona (1:02.52)	4:26.77	
33	2	8	Northern Mariana Islands	Piper Raho (1:11.72); Maria Batallones (1:16.53); Kouki Cerezo Watanabe (1:02.57); Michael Miller (57.06)	4:27.88	NR
34	2	0	Cape Verde	Rohan Shearer (1:01.58); Jayla Pina (1:13.55); Kaila Dacruz (1:17.76); Jose Tati (59.27)	4:32.16	NR
35	1	5	Maldives	Amna Thazkiyah Mirsaad (1:14.66); Mohamed Aan Hussain (1:15.63); Mohamed Rihan Shiham (1:04.42); Meral Ayn Latheef (1:05.52)	4:40.23	NR
36	2	2	Papua New Guinea	Jhnayali Tokome-Garap (1:14.65); Joanna Chen (1:29.62); Nathaniel Noka (1:03.81); Josh Tarere (55.35)	4:43.43	
37	1	6	Rwanda	Aragsan Mugabo (1:20.17); Kalisa Keza (1:44.39); Oscar Peyre Mitilla (55.14); Kevin Kaiga (1:08.80)	5:08.50	
	3	2	Israel	Anastasia Gorbenko (1:00.03); Gur Itzhaki (1:01.12); Arielle Hayon (59.21); Denis Loktev	Disqualified	
	2	1	Nigeria	Did not start		
	4	8	Hungary	Did not start		

== Final ==
The final was started at 20:47.

Rank	Lane	Nation	Swimmers	Time	Notes
1st place, gold medalist(s)	1	Neutral Athletes B	Miron Lifintsev (51.78); Kirill Prigoda (57.56); Daria Klepikova (55.97); Daria Trofimova (52.66)	3:37.97	CR, NR (Note: National record for Russia, though they were representing the Neutral Athletes B team.)
2nd place, silver medalist(s)	3	China	Xu Jiayu (53.23); Qin Haiyang (58.14); Zhang Yufei (55.96); Wu Qingfeng (52.66)	3:39.99	
3rd place, bronze medalist(s)	2	Canada	Kylie Masse (58.69); Oliver Dawson (59.63); Joshua Liendo (49.64); Taylor Ruck (52.94)	3:40.90	NR
4	5	Netherlands	Kai van Westering (54.03); Caspar Corbeau (58.74); Tessa Giele (56.29); Marrit Steenbergen (51.91)	3:40.97	NR
5	6	Australia	Kaylee McKeown (57.65); Nash Wilkes (59.98); Matthew Temple (50.26); Milla Jansen (53.13)	3:41.02	
6	4	Italy	Christian Bacico (52.78); Nicolò Martinenghi (58.63); Costanza Cocconcelli (57.90); Sara Curtis (52.88)	3:42.19	
7	7	Japan	Riku Matsuyama (54.01); Taku Taniguchii (59.48); Mizuki Hirai (56.78); Nagisa Ikemoto (53.88)	3:44.15	
8	8	Poland	Ksawery Masiuk (53.19); Dominika Sztandera (1:06.53); Jakub Majerski (50.72); Katarzyna Wasick (53.83)	3:44.27	
