= Swimming at the 2025 World Aquatics Championships – Women's 50 metre freestyle =

Women's 50 metre freestyle at the 2025 World Aquatics Championships
- Venue: World Aquatics Championships Arena
- Location: Singapore Sports Hub, Kallang
- Dates: 2 August (heats and semifinals); 3 August (final)
- Competitors: 100 from 92 nations
- Winning time: 24.02

Medalists
gold medal	Meg Harris	Australia
silver medal	Wu Qingfeng	China
bronze medal	Cheng Yujie	China

The women's 50 metre freestyle event at the 2025 World Aquatics Championships was held from 2 to 3 August at the World Aquatics Championships Arena at the Singapore Sports Hub in Kallang, Singapore.

== Background ==
The event featured a wide-open field following the absence of Sweden's Sarah Sjöström, who had won the past three World Championship titles and the Paris 2024 Olympic gold. The primary gold medal contenders were Gretchen Walsh and Torri Huske of the United States, and Meg Harris of Australia, all seeded with 23.9 seconds. Poland's Kasia Wasick, one of the few active swimmers to have broken 24 seconds before, was also in contention. China’s Wu Qingfeng and Cheng Yujie, along with rising Europeans such as Milou van Wijk of the Netherlands, were expected to contend for places in the final and possibly medal.

== Qualification ==
Each National Federation was permitted to enter a maximum of two qualified athletes in each individual event, but they could do so only if both of them had attained the "A" standard qualification time in an approved qualification event. For this event, the "A" standard qualification time was 24.86 seconds. Federations could enter one athlete into the event if they met the "B" standard qualification time. For this event, the "B" standard qualification time was 25.73 seconds. Athletes could also enter the event if they had met an "A" or "B" standard in a different event and their Federation had not entered anyone else. Additional considerations applied to Federations who had few swimmers enter through the standard qualification times. Federations in this category could at least enter two men and two women to the competition, all of whom could enter into up to two events.

Top 10 fastest qualification times
Swimmer	Country	Time	Competition
Sarah Sjöström	Sweden	23.66	2024 Summer Olympics
Gretchen Walsh	United States	23.91	2025 United States Championships
Meg Harris	Australia	23.97	2024 Summer Olympics
Torri Huske	United States	23.98	2025 United States Championships
Shayna Jack	Australia	23.99	2024 Australian Olympic Trials
Kate Douglass	United States	24.04	2025 United States Championships
Simone Manuel	United States	24.13	2024 U.S. Olympic Trials
Wu Qingfeng	China	24.18	2025 Chinese Championships
Zhang Yufei	China	24.20	2024 Summer Olympics
Katarzyna Wasick	Poland	24.20	Texas stop of the 2024 TYR Pro Series

== Records ==
Prior to the competition, the existing world and championship records were as follows.

World record	Sarah Sjöström (SWE)	23.61	Fukuoka, Japan	29 July 2023
Competition record	Sarah Sjöström (SWE)	23.61	Fukuoka, Japan	29 July 2023

== Heats ==
The heats took place on 2 August at 10:02.

Rank	Heat	Lane	Name	Nationality	Time	Notes
1	10	4	Meg Harris	Australia	24.32	Q
2	9	5	Milou van Wijk	Netherlands	24.39	Q
3	9	3	Sara Curtis	Italy	24.41	Q, NR
4	10	5	Katarzyna Wasick	Poland	24.44	Q
5	11	3	Cheng Yujie	China	24.47	Q
6	9	6	Béryl Gastaldello	France	24.53	Q
6	11	5	Wu Qingfeng	China	24.53	Q
8	9	7	Marrit Steenbergen	Netherlands	24.62	Q
9	10	2	Taylor Ruck	Canada	24.63	Q
10	10	3	Florine Gaspard	Belgium	24.64	Q
10	11	0	Arina Surkova	Neutral Athletes B	24.64	Q
12	10	7	Julie Kepp Jensen	Denmark	24.65	Q
13	9	4	Torri Huske	United States	24.72	Q
14	11	4	Gretchen Walsh	United States	24.79	Q
15	10	6	Eva Okaro	Great Britain	24.81	Q
16	11	2	Petra Senánszky	Hungary	24.89	Q
17	11	7	Analia Pigrée	France	24.93	
18	11	9	Caitlin de Lange	South Africa	24.95	
19	10	0	Barbora Janíčková	Czech Republic	24.98	
20	9	2	Theodora Drakou	Greece	25.00	
21	10	1	Lorrane Ferreira	Brazil	25.02	
22	8	6	Laura Quilter	New Zealand	25.08	
23	9	8	Roos Vanotterdijk	Belgium	25.09	
24	8	4	Lillian Slušná	Slovakia	25.22	
25	11	1	Danielle Hill	Ireland	25.24	
26	8	3	Sofia Åstedt	Sweden	25.31	
27	8	2	María Daza	Spain	25.40	
28	8	7	Iris Julia Berger	Austria	25.50	
29	9	0	Amanda Lim	Singapore	25.53	
30	9	9	Li Sum Yiu	Hong Kong	25.54	
31	9	1	Aleksandra Kuznetsova	Neutral Athletes B	25.55	
32	10	8	Angelina Köhler	Germany	25.56	
33	8	1	Hur Yeon-kyung	South Korea	25.61	
34	8	5	Lismar Lyon	Venezuela	25.63	
35	8	0	Amel Melih	Algeria	25.70	
36	7	3	Marina Spadoni	El Salvador	25.74	NR
37	10	9	Jenjira Srisaard	Thailand	25.75	
38	7	4	Gloria Muzito	Uganda	25.76	
39	8	9	Andrea Berrino	Argentina	25.81	
40	7	1	Anahira McCutcheon	Fiji	25.84	NR
41	7	9	Sara Mose	Kenya	25.96	
42	7	5	Jóhanna Elín Guðmundsdóttir	Iceland	25.98	
43	7	6	Kirabo Namutebi	Uganda	26.10	
44	8	8	Chiu Yi-chen	Chinese Taipei	26.12	
45	6	4	Elisabeth Timmer	Aruba	26.25	
46	6	5	Tilly Collymore	Grenada	26.42	NR
47	6	3	Joselle Mensah	Ghana	26.48	NR
48	7	0	Paige van der Westhuizen	Zimbabwe	26.55	
49	7	7	Cielo Moya	Peru	26.62	
50	7	2	Adriana Giles	Bolivia	26.88	
51	5	3	Varsenik Manucharyan	Armenia	26.92	
51	6	2	Hana Beiqi	Kosovo	26.92	
53	6	0	Jovana Kuljača	Montenegro	27.22	
54	6	6	Adaku Nwandu	Nigeria	27.23	
55	6	1	Alicia Kok Shun	Mauritius	27.35	
56	5	6	Ionnah Eliane Douillet	Benin	27.38	
57	5	2	Noelie Annette Lacour	Gabon	27.56	NR
58	6	7	Victoria Russell	Bahamas	27.59	
59	6	8	Mikaili Charlemagne	Saint Lucia	27.64	
60	5	4	Kennice Greene	Saint Vincent and the Grenadines	27.70	
61	5	5	María Fernández	Dominican Republic	27.77	
62	6	9	Riley Miller	Virgin Islands	27.79	
63	3	0	Aminata Barrow	Gambia	27.83	NR
64	5	1	Jhnayali Tokome-Garap	Papua New Guinea	27.86	
65	5	8	Anastasiya Morginshtern	Turkmenistan	28.15	
66	1	2	Timipame-Ere Akiayefa	Nigeria	28.16	
67	2	2	Marina Abu Shamaleh	Palestine	28.25	
68	4	5	Kyra Dalilah de Cuba	Curaçao	28.30	
69	4	6	Siwakhile Dlamini	Eswatini	28.47	
70	5	0	Carlota Filipa Silva	Angola	28.61	
71	4	2	Maesha Saadi	Comoros	28.66	
72	2	8	Jana Al-Tawil	Jordan	28.82	
73	5	7	Kaiya Brown	Samoa	28.88	
74	1	4	Liana Planz	American Samoa	28.95	
75	4	7	Lois Eliora Irishura	Burundi	29.14	
75	4	8	Mayah Chouloute	Haiti	29.14	
77	4	3	Aaliyah Palestrini	Seychelles	29.18	
78	4	4	Jasmine Schofield	Dominica	29.37	
79	3	4	Arleigha Hall	Turks and Caicos Islands	29.42	
80	4	1	Chanchakriya Kheun	Cambodia	29.60	
81	4	0	Adaya Sian Bourne	Sint Maarten	29.63	
82	5	9	Charissa Panuve	Tonga	29.69	
83	2	6	Marta Mpfumo	Mozambique	29.76	
84	3	9	Aarya Maharjan	Nepal	30.07	
85	2	5	Tamsiri Christine Niyomxay	Laos	30.36	
86	1	3	Skyla Connor	Saint Kitts and Nevis	30.47	
87	4	9	Iman Kouraogo	Burkina Faso	30.52	
88	1	5	Lana Al-Rasheed	Saudi Arabia	30.80	
89	3	5	Grace Manuela Nguelo'o	Cameroon	31.09	
90	2	7	Saba Sultan	Kuwait	31.27	
91	3	2	Hearmela Neguse Melke	Eritrea	31.33	
92	2	4	Mst Any Akter	Bangladesh	31.39	
93	3	3	Lina Alemayehu Selo	Ethiopia	31.58	
94	3	7	Marie Amenou	Togo	32.49	
95	3	6	Djenabou Jolie Bah	Guinea	32.96	
96	1	6	Kalisa Keza	Rwanda	33.95	
97	3	1	Vanessa Bobimbo	Republic of the Congo	34.62	
98	2	3	Oumou Sangafe	Mali	38.07	
99	2	9	Salena Marlin	Timor-Leste	41.35	
100	2	1	Nadine Dju	Guinea-Bissau	53.16	
	2	0	Rosita Manana Bindang	Equatorial Guinea	Did not start	
	3	8	Olamide Sam	Sierra Leone	Did not start	
	7	8	Diana Petkova	Bulgaria	Did not start	
	11	6	Olivia Wunsch	Australia	Did not start	
	11	8	Silvia Di Pietro	Italy	Did not start	

== Semifinals ==
The semifinals took place on 2 August at 19:51.

Rank	Heat	Lane	Swimmer	Nation	Time	Notes
1	1	5	Katarzyna Wasick	Poland	24.19	Q
2	1	4	Milou van Wijk	Netherlands	24.29	Q
3	1	1	Gretchen Walsh	United States	24.31	Q
3	2	4	Meg Harris	Australia	24.31	Q
5	2	3	Cheng Yujie	China	24.36	Q
5	2	6	Wu Qingfeng	China	24.36	Q
7	2	1	Torri Huske	United States	24.41	Q
8	1	2	Florine Gaspard	Belgium	24.45	Q
9	2	5	Sara Curtis	Italy	24.48	
10	2	2	Taylor Ruck	Canada	24.53	
11	2	8	Eva Okaro	Great Britain	24.55	
12	1	6	Marrit Steenbergen	Netherlands	24.61	
13	1	3	Béryl Gastaldello	France	24.64	
13	2	7	Arina Surkova	Neutral Athletes B	24.64	
15	1	7	Julie Kepp Jensen	Denmark	24.77	
16	1	8	Petra Senánszky	Hungary	24.87	

== Final ==
The final took place on 3 August at 19:18.

Rank	Lane	Name	Nationality	Time	Notes
1st place, gold medalist(s)	6	Meg Harris	Australia	24.02	
2nd place, silver medalist(s)	7	Wu Qingfeng	China	24.26	
3rd place, bronze medalist(s)	2	Cheng Yujie	China	24.28	
4	3	Gretchen Walsh	United States	24.40	
5	5	Milou van Wijk	Netherlands	24.47	
6	1	Torri Huske	United States	24.50	
7	8	Florine Gaspard	Belgium	24.63	
8	4	Katarzyna Wasick	Poland	24.74	
