= Swimming at the 2025 World Aquatics Championships – Men's 200 metre individual medley =

Men's 200 metre individual medley at the 2025 World Aquatics Championships
- Venue: World Aquatics Championships Arena
- Location: Singapore Sports Hub, Kallang
- Dates: 30 July (heats and semifinals); 31 July (final)
- Competitors: 47 from 40 nations
- Winning time: 1:53.68

Medalists
gold medal	Léon Marchand	France
silver medal	Shaine Casas	United States
bronze medal	Hubert Kós	Hungary

The men's 200 metre individual medley event at the 2025 World Aquatics Championships was held from 30 to 31 July 2025 at the World Aquatics Championships Arena at the Singapore Sports Hub in Kallang, Singapore.

== Background ==
France’s Léon Marchand was the favorite after winning the 2024 Olympic gold in 1:54.06, which was 0.06 off Ryan Lochte’s world record from 2011. Marchand withdrew from the 200 butterfly and 200 breaststroke events about a week before the Championships, with one of his coaches stating that he wanted to focus mainly on the 200 medley, and SwimSwam opined that he could break the world record.

Great Britain’s Duncan Scott, the Olympic silver medalist, and China’s Wang Shun, the bronze medalist, had the second and third fastest times of 1:55.31 and 1:54.62, respectively. The United States’ Carson Foster and Shaine Casas were entering as challengers, with Casas leading the 2025 world rankings with 1:55.73. Canada’s Finlay Knox, Italy’s Alberto Razzetti, and Japan’s Tomoyuki Matsushita were also in contention.

== Qualification ==
Each National Federation was permitted to enter a maximum of two qualified athletes in each individual event, but they could do so only if both of them had attained the "A" standard qualification time in approved qualifying events. For this event, the "A" standard qualification time was 1:59.05. Federations could enter one athlete into the event if they met the "B" standard qualification time. For this event, the "B" standard qualification time was 2:03.22. Athletes could also enter the event if they had met an "A" or "B" standard in a different event and their Federation had not entered anyone else. Additional considerations applied to Federations who had few swimmers enter through the standard qualification times. Federations in this category could at least enter two men and two women to the competition, all of whom could enter into up to two events.

Top 10 fastest qualification times
Swimmer	Country	Time	Competition
Léon Marchand	France	1:54.06	2024 Summer Olympics
Duncan Scott	Great Britain	1:55.31	2024 Summer Olympics
Wang Shun	China	1:55.35	2024 Chinese Championships
Carson Foster	United States	1:55.65	2024 United States Olympic Trials
Shaine Casas	United States	1:55.73	2025 United States Championships
Finlay Knox	Canada	1:56.07	2024 Canadian Olympic Trials
Tomoyuki Matsushita	Japan	1:56.35	2025 Japanese Championships
Hubert Kós	Hungary	1:56.40	2024 Hungarian Championships
Tom Dean	Great Britain	1:56.44	2024 Great British Championships
Hugo González	Spain	1:56.48	2024 Spanish Olympic Trials

== Records ==
Prior to the competition, the existing world and championship records were as follows.

World record	Ryan Lochte (USA)	1:54.00	Shanghai, China	28 July 2011
Competition record	Ryan Lochte (USA)	1:54.00	Shanghai, China	28 July 2011

The following record was established during the competition:

Date	Event	Swimmer	Nation	Time	Record
30 July	Semifinals	Léon Marchand	France	1:52.69	WR

== Heats ==
The heats took place on 30 July at 11:00.

Rank	Heat	Lane	Swimmer	Nation	Time	Notes
1	5	4	Léon Marchand	France	1:57.63	Q
2	5	6	Kosuke Makino	Japan	1:57.74	Q
3	5	5	Shaine Casas	United States	1:57.76	Q
4	5	3	Hubert Kós	Hungary	1:57.93	Q
5	4	4	Duncan Scott	Great Britain	1:58.00	Q
6	4	7	Ilia Borodin	Neutral Athletes B	1:58.01	Q
7	4	6	Alberto Razzetti	Italy	1:58.14	Q
8	3	4	Carson Foster	United States	1:58.17	Q
9	3	6	Lewis Clareburt	New Zealand	1:58.19	Q
10	3	5	Tomoyuki Matsushita	Japan	1:58.28	Q
11	3	3	Wang Shun	China	1:58.43	Q
12	3	2	Tristan Jankovics	Canada	1:58.61	Q
13	5	2	William Petric	Australia	1:58.63	Q
14	5	0	Lucas Henveaux	Belgium	1:58.92	Q
15	4	1	Alexey Glivinksiy	Israel	1:59.00	Q
16	5	7	David Schlicht	Australia	1:59.50	Q
17	4	2	Gábor Zombori	Hungary	1:59.51	
18	4	5	Finlay Knox	Canada	1:59.64	
19	3	9	Thomas Jansen	Netherlands	2:00.04	
20	3	0	Gian-Luca Gartmann	Switzerland	2:00.26	
21	3	1	Apostolos Papastamos	Greece	2:00.38	
22	3	7	Massimiliano Matteazzi	Italy	2:00.51	
23	4	3	Tom Dean	Great Britain	2:00.76	
24	4	8	Jaouad Syoud	Algeria	2:00.99	
25	2	4	Munzer Kabbara	Lebanon	2:01.38	NR
26	5	9	Kim Min-suk	South Korea	2:01.61	
27	3	8	Nils Cadevall Micolau	Spain	2:01.70	
28	5	1	Matthew Sates	South Africa	2:01.80	
29	5	8	Wang Hsing-hao	Chinese Taipei	2:01.90	
30	4	0	Jakub Bursa	Czech Republic	2:01.93	
31	2	2	Denys Kesil	Ukraine	2:02.86	
32	2	5	Erick Gordillo	Guatemala	2:03.10	
33	2	6	Zackery Tay	Singapore	2:03.55	
34	2	7	Mohamed Mahmoud	Qatar	2:03.72	
35	2	3	František Jablčník	Slovakia	2:04.41	
36	4	9	Patrick Groters	Aruba	2:04.71	
37	2	8	Gian Santos	Philippines	2:05.07	
38	2	1	Shoan Ganguly	India	2:05.40	
39	1	1	Héctor Ruvalcaba	Mexico	2:06.16	
40	2	0	Tan Khai Xin	Malaysia	2:07.07	
41	2	9	Isak Brisenfeldt	Faroe Islands	2:08.44	
42	1	4	Kaio Faftine	Mozambique	2:10.48	NR
43	1	2	Pedro Pinotes	Angola	2:13.28	
44	1	5	Kaeden Gleason	Virgin Islands	2:13.89	
45	1	6	David Akopyan	Turkmenistan	2:16.21	
46	1	3	José Canjulo	Namibia	2:19.56	
47	1	7	Ocean Campus	Guam	2:24.35	

== Semifinals ==
The semifinals took place on 30 July at 20:34.

Rank	Heat	Lane	Swimmer	Nation	Time	Notes
1	2	4	Léon Marchand	France	1:52.69	Q, WR
2	2	5	Shaine Casas	United States	1:55.13	Q
3	2	3	Duncan Scott	Great Britain	1:55.51	Q
4	1	2	Tomoyuki Matsushita	Japan	1:57.11	Q
5	1	5	Hubert Kós	Hungary	1:57.22	Q
6	2	2	Lewis Clareburt	New Zealand	1:57.29	Q
7	2	7	Wang Shun	China	1:57.48	Q
8	1	6	Carson Foster	United States	1:57.49	WD
9	1	4	Kosuke Makino	Japan	1:57.51	R
10	2	6	Alberto Razzetti	Italy	1:57.53	
11	1	3	Ilia Borodin	Neutral Athletes B	1:57.67	
12	2	1	William Petric	Australia	1:58.21	
13	1	7	Tristan Jankovics	Canada	1:59.13	
14	2	8	Alexey Glivinksiy	Israel	1:59.41	
15	1	8	David Schlicht	Australia	1:59.81	
16	1	1	Lucas Henveaux	Belgium	2:00.18	

== Final ==
The final took place on 31 July at 19:23.

Rank	Lane	Name	Nationality	Time	Notes
1st place, gold medalist(s)	4	Léon Marchand	France	1:53.68	
2nd place, silver medalist(s)	5	Shaine Casas	United States	1:54.30	
3rd place, bronze medalist(s)	2	Hubert Kós	Hungary	1:55.34	
4	3	Duncan Scott	Great Britain	1:56.32	
5	7	Lewis Clareburt	New Zealand	1:57.06	NR
6	6	Tomoyuki Matsushita	Japan	1:57.52	
7	1	Wang Shun	China	1:57.92	
8	8	Kosuke Makino	Japan	1:59.25	
