= Open water swimming at the 2025 World Aquatics Championships – Men's 5 km =

Men's 5 km at the 2025 World Aquatics Championships
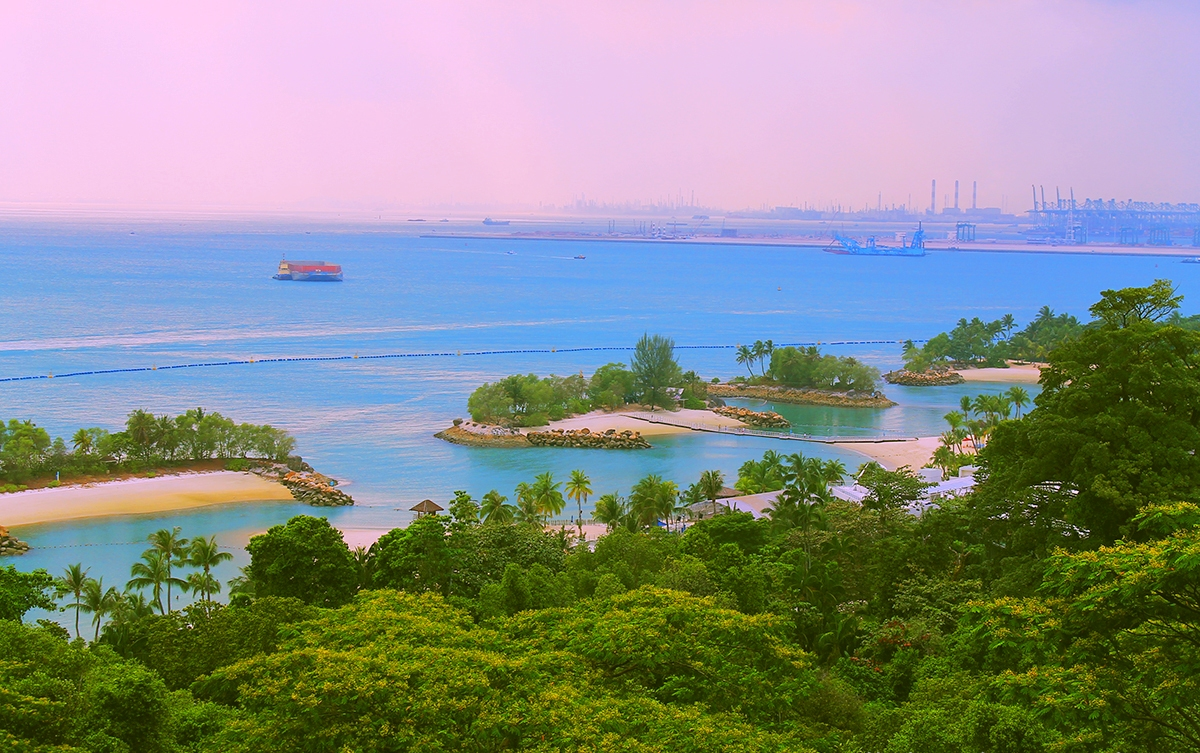
- Palawan Beach in 2014
- Venue: Palawan Beach
- Location: Sentosa, Singapore
- Dates: 18 July
- Competitors: 85 from 51 nations
- Winning time: 57:26.4

Medalists
| gold medal | Florian Wellbrock | Germany |
| silver medal | Gregorio Paltrinieri | Italy |
| bronze medal | Marc-Antoine Olivier | France |

The men's 5 km competition at the 2025 World Aquatics Championships was held on 18 July. The race consisted of three laps of a course off the coast of Palawan Beach, Sentosa.

Hungary's Dávid Betlehem took the lead early in the race. He held his lead through the first lap. Over the second lap he was overtaken by Germany's Florian Wellbrock and Italy's Gregorio Paltrinieri, and Wellbrock maintained first position from there on out to win with a time of 57:26.4. Paltrinieri finished second with 57:29.3, and France's Marc-Antoine Olivier finished third with 57:30.4.

It was Wellbrock's third time winning this event at the World Championships, and it was Paltrinieri's eighteenth world championship medal. Wellbrock and Paltrinieri commented after the race that the warm water made the swim especially challenging.

== Background ==
Germany's Florian Wellbrock, Italy's Gregorio Paltrinieri and Australia's Kyle Lee were returning to the open water after medalling in the 10 km event earlier in the 2025 World Championships. Paltrinieri was swimming with injuries to his finger and elbow. European Aquatics wrote that most of the swimmers in this race "will be looking to either avenge their earlier performance or build on their success" from the 10 km.

=== Qualification ===
Each World Aquatics member federation could enter up to two athletes.

== Race ==
The race consisted of three laps of a course off the coast of Palawan Beach, Sentosa. It was held on 18 July at 10:00 SGT. Unlike in most 5 km open water races, athletes were allowed to ingest sustenance during the race to stay hydrated in the warm water.

Hungary's Dávid Betlehem took the lead early in the race. He held his lead through the first lap and skipped the feeding station at the end of that lap to further increase his lead. Over the second lap he was caught up by Wellbrock and Paltrinieri. When he was caught up, he dropped to third, settling behind Paltrinieri in second and Wellbrock in first. By the end of lap two, Wellbrock was in first with a two-second lead on Paltrinieri in second. Betlehem was in third, France's Marc-Antoine Olivier was in fourth, and Italy's Marcello Guidi was in fifth.

A pack of swimmers stayed behind Wellbrock over the start of the second lap, and Wellbrock extended his lead from them going into the final turn. On the second-to-last buoy, Paltrinieri broke free of the chasing pack and began trying to catch Wellbrock. He was unable to, though, and Wellbrock won with a time of 57:26.4. Paltrinieri finished second with 57:29.3, and Olivier finished third with 57:30.4.

Wellbrock's win earned him his second gold of the Championships, since he won the 10 km event earlier in the programme, and it was Paltrinieri's second silver, as he placed second in the 10 km. It was Wellbrock's third time winning this event at the World Championships, and it was his eighth World Championship gold medal. It was Paltrinieri's eighteenth World Championship medal.

The water was warm—reported to be 30.3 °C (86.5 °F)—and the air was warm and humid. After the race, Paltrinieri said, "It's so hot. These conditions are one of the toughest I've ever raced in", and Wellbrock said during the Championships: "The conditions here are tough, everybody knows it’s hot outside, and the water temperature is crazy, close to 31 degrees." CNA reported that the conditions were better than in the 10 km race.

Results
| Rank | Swimmer | Nationality | Time |
|---|---|---|---|
| 1st place, gold medalist(s) | Florian Wellbrock | Germany | 57:26.4 |
| 2nd place, silver medalist(s) | Gregorio Paltrinieri | Italy | 57:29.3 |
| 3rd place, bronze medalist(s) | Marc-Antoine Olivier | France | 57:30.4 |
| 4 | Marcello Guidi | Italy | 57:32.3 |
| 5 | Denis Adeev | Neutral Athletes B | 57:37.2 |
| 6 | Dávid Betlehem | Hungary | 57:37.2 |
| 7 | Kyle Lee | Australia | 57:39.6 |
| 8 | Luca Karl | Austria | 57:42.0 |
| 9 | Oliver Klemet | Germany | 57:42.2 |
| 10 | Thomas Raymond | Australia | 57:47.2 |
| 11 | Paul Niederberger | Switzerland | 58:03.9 |
| 12 | Matheus Melecchi | Brazil | 58:04.6 |
| 13 | Eric Brown | Canada | 58:08.6 |
| 14 | Kristóf Rasovszky | Hungary | 58:08.8 |
| 15 | Martin Straka | Czech Republic | 58:12.5 |
| 16 | Ratthawit Thammananthachote | Thailand | 58:13.7 |
| 17 | Dylan Gravley | United States | 58:15.9 |
| 18 | Athanasios Kynigakis | Greece | 58:24.3 |
| 19 | Sacha Velly | France | 58:37.5 |
| 20 | Ivan Puskovitch | United States | 1:00:26.3 |
| 21 | Christian Schreiber | Switzerland | 1:00:27.7 |
| 22 | Piotr Woźniak | Poland | 1:00:31.6 |
| 23 | Esteban Enderica | Ecuador | 1:00:56.0 |
| 24 | Zhang Jinhou | China | 1:00:56.0 |
| 25 | Kaito Tsujimori | Japan | 1:01:00.2 |
| 26 | Lan Tianchen | China | 1:01:01.8 |
| 27 | Lev Cherepanov | Kazakhstan | 1:01:03.8 |
| 28 | Park Jae-hun | South Korea | 1:01:03.9 |
| 29 | Savelii Luzin | Neutral Athletes B | 1:01:04.9 |
| 30 | Diogo Cardoso | Portugal | 1:01:06.7 |
| 31 | Ronaldo Zambrano | Venezuela | 1:01:08.9 |
| 32 | David Farinango | Ecuador | 1:01:09.2 |
| 33 | Bartosz Kapała | Poland | 1:01:21.9 |
| 34 | Oh Se-beom | South Korea | 1:01:22.4 |
| 35 | Matthew Caldwell | South Africa | 1:01:23.8 |
| 36 | Diego Vera | Venezuela | 1:01:24.0 |
| 37 | Diego Obele | Mexico | 1:01:24.0 |
| 38 | Connor Buck | South Africa | 1:01:26.3 |
| 39 | Riku Takaki | Japan | 1:01:26.9 |
| 40 | Logan Vanhuys | Belgium | 1:02:10.5 |
| 41 | Adrián Ywanaga | Peru | 1:02:15.4 |
| 42 | Jamarr Bruno | Puerto Rico | 1:02:40.8 |
| 43 | José Barrios | Guatemala | 1:02:41.2 |
| 44 | Atakan Ercan | Turkey | 1:02:41.2 |
| 45 | Diego Dulieu | Honduras | 1:02:41.9 |
| 46 | Su Bo-ling | Chinese Taipei | 1:02:42.1 |
| 47 | Konstantinos Chourdakis | Greece | 1:02:43.1 |
| 48 | Emre Sarp Zeytinoğlu | Turkey | 1:02:43.8 |
| 49 | Nico Esslinger | Namibia | 1:02:47.9 |
| 50 | Théo Druenne | Monaco | 1:02:51.9 |
| 51 | Jeison Rojas | Costa Rica | 1:02:54.0 |
| 52 | Tiago Campos | Portugal | 1:03:27.9 |
| 53 | Tsao Jun-yan | Chinese Taipei | 1:03:31.5 |
| 54 | Esteban Faure | Monaco | 1:03:47.1 |
| 55 | Ilias El Fallaki | Morocco | 1:03:47.4 |
| 56 | Grgo Mujan | Croatia | 1:03:55.5 |
| 57 | Alan González | Mexico | 1:04:12.3 |
| 58 | Keith Sin | Hong Kong | 1:04:19.0 |
| 59 | Mochammad Akbar Putra Taufik | Indonesia | 1:04:27.6 |
| 60 | Prashans Hiremagalur | India | 1:04:27.7 |
| 61 | Richard Urban | Slovakia | 1:04:57.5 |
| 62 | Tomáš Peciar | Slovakia | 1:07:01.8 |
| 63 | Nithikorn Jeampiriyakul | Thailand | 1:07:19.0 |
| 64 | Chan Tsun Hin | Hong Kong | 1:07:20.3 |
| 65 | Oscar García | Guatemala | 1:07:22.1 |
| 66 | Damien Payet | Seychelles | 1:07:22.5 |
| 67 | Dhrupad Ramakrishna | India | 1:07:25.1 |
| 68 | Luke Tan | Singapore | 1:07:26.9 |
| 69 | Dilanka Shehan | Sri Lanka | 1:07:32.5 |
| 70 | Juan Núñez | Dominican Republic | 1:09:07.7 |
| 71 | Percy Escobar | Bolivia | 1:11:26.2 |
| 72 | Tharusha Perera | Sri Lanka | 1:11:26.6 |
| 73 | Joaquín Estigarribia | Paraguay | 1:11:28.6 |
| 74 | Ian Leong | Singapore | 1:11:34.8 |
| — | Jayden De Swardt | Zimbabwe | OTL |
| — | Tristan Nell | Namibia | OTL |
| — | Connor Grist | Zimbabwe | DNF |
| — | David Padre | Angola | DNF |
| — | Igbaal Bayusuf | Kenya | DNF |
| — | Benjamin Lutaaya | Uganda | DNF |
| — | Benco Van Rooyen | Botswana | DNF |
| — | Galymzhan Balabek | Kazakhstan | DNF |
| — | Marin Mogić | Croatia | DNF |
| — | Diego Solano | Bolivia | DNF |
| — | Hamza Kassim | Kenya | DNF |
| — | Luiz Loureiro | Brazil | DNS |
| — | Rami Rahmouni | Tunisia | DNS |

== Further information ==
- Ross, Andy (18 July 2025). "Go With the Flo: Wellbrock Wins Third 5km World Title in Singapore". World Aquatics. Archived from the original on 18 July 2025. – Race summary and quotes from the medallists
- World Aquatics Championships: Conditions in 5km Race Much Better Compared to Jul 16's 10km Starts (Video). CNA. 18 July 2025 – via YouTube. – Report on the conditions during the race and an interview with the winner, Florian Wellbrock
- "Germany's Wellbrock Completes Open Water Golden Double at Singapore Worlds". english.news.cn. Xinhuanet. 18 July 2025. Archived from the original on 12 October 2025. – Gallery containing images of the race
