= Mexico at the 2025 World Aquatics Championships =

- Flag of Mexico
- World Aquatics code: MEX
- National federation: Mexican Swimming Federation

in Singapore
- Competitors: 41 in 5 sports
- Medals Ranked 12th: Gold 1 Silver 4 Bronze 3 Total 8

World Aquatics Championships appearances
- 1973; 1975; 1978; 1982; 1986; 1991; 1994; 1998; 2001; 2003; 2005; 2007; 2009; 2011; 2013; 2015; 2017; 2019; 2022; 2023; 2024; 2025

Mexico competed at the 2025 World Aquatics Championships in Singapore from July 11 to August 3, 2025.

== Medalists ==
Medal	Name	Sport	Event	Date
Gold	Osmar Olvera	Diving	Men's 3 metre springboard	1 August
Silver	Osmar Olvera; Randal Willars; Alejandra Estudillo; Zyanya Parra	Diving	Team	26 July
Silver	Osmar Olvera	Diving	Men's 1 metre springboard	27 July
Silver	Gabriela Agúndez; Alejandra Estudillo	Diving	Women's synchronized 10 metre platform	28 July
Silver	Juan Celaya; Osmar Olvera	Diving	Men's synchronized 3 metre springboard	28 July
Bronze	Diego Villalobos	Artistic swimming	Men's solo technical routine	19 July
Bronze	Lía Cueva; Mía Cueva	Diving	Women's synchronized 3 metre springboard	29 July
Bronze	Randal Willars	Diving	Men's 10 metre platform	3 August

Medals by sport
Sport	1st place, gold medalist(s)	2nd place, silver medalist(s)	3rd place, bronze medalist(s)	Total
Diving	1	4	2	7
Artistic swimming	0	0	1	1
Total	1	4	3	8

== Competitors ==
The following is the list of competitors in the Championships.

Sport	Men	Women	Total
Artistic swimming	1	8	9
Diving	5	8	13
High diving	2	1	3
Open water swimming	2	4	6
Swimming	7	3	10
Total	17	24	41

== Artistic swimming ==
Men

Athlete	Event	Preliminaries		Final	
Athlete	Event	Points	Rank	Points	Rank
Diego Villalobos	Solo technical routine	—		238.1600	3rd place, bronze medalist(s)
Diego Villalobos	Solo free routine	—		206.8150	5

Women

Athlete	Event	Preliminaries		Final	
Athlete	Event	Points	Rank	Points	Rank
Marla Arellano; Itzamary González	Duet technical routine	278.6633	8 Q	276.7307	8
Marla Arellano; Itzamary González	Duet free routine	246.7462	8 Q	228.6608	11

Mixed

Athlete	Event	Preliminaries		Final	
Athlete	Event	Points	Rank	Points	Rank
Diego Villalobos; Joana Jiménez	Mixed duet technical routine	—		218.8959	5
Regina Alférez; Marla Arellano; Miranda Barrera; Itzamary González; Glenda Inzunza; Joana Jiménez; Pamela Toscano; Diego Villalobos; Sofía Valenzuela	Team free routine	305.0511	5 Q	285.7186	6
Regina Alférez; Marla Arellano; Miranda Barrera; Itzamary González; Glenda Inzunza; Joana Jiménez; Pamela Toscano; Diego Villalobos	Team acrobatic routine	196.4790	8 Q	216.7876	5

== Diving ==
Men

Athlete	Event	Preliminaries		Semifinals		Final	
Athlete	Event	Points	Rank	Points	Rank	Points	Rank
Juan Celaya	1 m springboard	347.20	14	—		Did not advance	
Juan Celaya	3 m springboard	362.75	23	Did not advance			
Osmar Olvera	1 m springboard	366.95	6 Q	—		429.60	2nd place, silver medalist(s)
Osmar Olvera	3 m springboard	451.90	2 Q	472.50	3 Q	529.55	1st place, gold medalist(s)
Emilio Treviño	10 m platform	367.30	21	Did not advance			
Randal Willars	10 m platform	441.75	8 Q	446.20	8 Q	511.95	3rd place, bronze medalist(s)
Juan Celaya; Osmar Olvera	3 m synchro springboard	405.54	2 Q	—		449.28	2nd place, silver medalist(s)
Kevin Berlín; Randal Willars	10 m synchro platform	356.94	9	—		Did not advance	

Women

Athlete	Event	Preliminaries		Semifinals		Final	
Athlete	Event	Points	Rank	Points	Rank	Points	Rank
Mía Cueva	1 m springboard	242.40	11 Q	—		260.05	7
Alejandra Estudillo	10 m platform	304.80	9 Q	281.40	12 Q	288.70	12
María García	1 m springboard	237.10	15	—		Did not advance	
María García	3 m springboard	270.45	16 Q	279.50	12 Q	270.55	12
Abigail González	10 m platform	271.10	17 Q	228.50	18	Did not advance	
Aranza Vázquez	3 m springboard	303.45	4 Q	304.80	6 Q	297.45	9
Lía Cueva; Mía Cueva	3 m synchro springboard	268.38	4 Q	—		294.36	3rd place, bronze medalist(s)
Gabriela Agúndez; Alejandra Estudillo	10 m synchro platform	284.58	4 Q	—		304.80	2nd place, silver medalist(s)

Mixed

Athlete	Event	Final	
Athlete	Event	Points	Rank
Osmar Olvera; Zyanya Parra	3 m synchro springboard	278.82	4
Kevin Berlín; Alejandra Estudillo	10 m synchro platform	304.56	4
Osmar Olvera; Randal Willars; Alejandra Estudillo; Zyanya Parra	10 m synchro platform	426.30	2nd place, silver medalist(s)

== High diving ==
Athlete	Event	Points	Rank
Antonio Corzo	Men's high diving	288.90	17
Jonathan Paredes	Men's high diving	407.40	4
Alejandra Aguilar	Women's high diving	244.40	13

== Open water swimming ==
Men

Athlete	Event	Heats		Semifinal		Final	
Athlete	Event	Time	Rank	Time	Rank	Time	Rank
Alan González	Men's 5 km	—				1:04:12.3	57
Alan González	Men's 10 km	—				2:17:34.0	52
Diego Obele	Men's 5 km	—				1:01:24.0	37
Diego Obele	Men's 10 km	—				2:11:52.6	46

Women

Athlete	Event	Heats		Semifinal		Final	
Athlete	Event	Time	Rank	Time	Rank	Time	Rank
Paulina Alanís	Women's 5 km	—				1:09:50.5	41
Paulina Alanís	Women's 10 km	—				2:21:03.3	36
Sharon Guerrero	Women's 3 km knockout sprints	18:25.5	15	Did not advance			
Sharon Guerrero	Women's 10 km	—				2:22:07.5	39
Sara Martínez	Women's 5 km	—				1:13:23.1	57
Citlali Mora	Women's 3 km knockout sprints	19:25.6	20	Did not advance			

Mixed

Athlete	Event	Time	Rank
Diego Obele; Sharon Guerrero; Alan González; Paulina Alanís	Team relay	1:15:54.3	16

== Swimming ==
Mexico entered 10 swimmers.

Men

Athlete	Event	Heat		Semi-final		Final	
Athlete	Event	Time	Rank	Time	Rank	Time	Rank
Miguel de Lara	100 m breaststroke	1:01.01	28	Did not advance			
Miguel de Lara	200 m breaststroke	2:14.41	24	Did not advance			
Jorge Iga	100 m freestyle	49.17	34	Did not advance			
Jorge Iga	100 m butterfly	53.14	40	Did not advance			
Humberto Nájera	200 m backstroke	1:58.65	25	Did not advance			
Andrés Puente	50 m breaststroke	27.27	21	Did not advance			
Marcus Reyes-Gentry	50 m backstroke	24.98	22 NR	Did not advance			
Marcus Reyes-Gentry	100 m backstroke	54.36	28	Did not advance			
Héctor Ruvalcaba	200 m butterfly	2:01.66	28	Did not advance			
Héctor Ruvalcaba	200 m individual medley	2:06.16	39	Did not advance			
Andres Dupont; Jorge Iga; Marcus Reyes-Gentry; Héctor Ruvalcaba	4 × 100 m freestyle relay	3:18.81	19	—		Did not advance	
Marcus Reyes-Gentry; Miguel de Lara; Jorge Iga; Andrés Dupont	4 × 100 m medley relay	3:35.81 NR	15	—		Did not advance	

Women

Athlete	Event	Heat		Semi-final		Final	
Athlete	Event	Time	Rank	Time	Rank	Time	Rank
Miranda Grana	100 m backstroke	1:01.10	20	Did not advance			
Miranda Grana	200 m backstroke	2:12.70	26	Did not advance			
Miranda Grana	100 m butterfly	59.86	30	Did not advance			
Celia Pulido	50 m backstroke	27.97 NR; 28.30	16 S/off; 2	Did not advance			
Celia Pulido	50 m butterfly	26.40 NR	26	Did not advance			
Melissa Rodríguez	50 m breaststroke	32.00	35	Did not advance			
Melissa Rodríguez	100 m breaststroke	1:09.30	36	Did not advance			

Mixed

Athlete	Event	Heat		Semi-final		Final	
Athlete	Event	Time	Rank	Time	Rank	Time	Rank
Jorge Iga; Andrés Dupont; Miranda Grana; Celia Pulido	4 × 100 m freestyle relay	3:28.96	16	—		Did not advance	
Celia Pulido; Miguel de Lara; Miranda Grana; Andrés Dupont	4 × 100 m medley relay	3:49.34 NR	15	—		Did not advance	
