= Swimming at the 2025 World Aquatics Championships – Men's 400 metre freestyle =

Men's 400 metre freestyle at the 2025 World Aquatics Championships
- Venue: World Aquatics Championships Arena
- Location: Singapore Sports Hub, Kallang
- Dates: 27 July
- Competitors: 43 from 36 nations
- Winning time: 3:42.35

Medalists
gold medal	Lukas Märtens	Germany
silver medal	Samuel Short	Australia
bronze medal	Kim Woo-min	South Korea

The men's 400 metre freestyle event at the 2025 World Aquatics Championships was held on 27 July 2025 at the World Aquatics Championships Arena at the Singapore Sports Hub in Kallang, Singapore.

== Background ==
Seven of the eight 2024 Paris Olympic finalists were entered into the event. Germany’s Lukas Märtens, fresh from breaking the long-standing 400 freestyle world record in 3:39.96 earlier in the year, was entering as the clear favourite, seeking his first long-course world title in the event. He was joined by Australia’s Elijah Winnington, the 2022 world champion and a 3:41.22 performer, and South Korea’s Kim Woo-min, the 2024 world champion. Australia’s Samuel Short, the 2023 world champion with a 3:40.68 lifetime best, and Brazil’s Guilherme Costa, who broke the Americas record with 3:42.76 in Paris, were also in contention. Newer challengers included American Rex Maurer, ranked third in 2025 with 3:43.33, and Hungary’s Kristóf Rasovszky.

== Qualification ==
Each National Federation was permitted to enter a maximum of two qualified athletes in each individual event, but they could do so only if both of them had attained the "A" standard qualification time. For this event, the "A" standard qualification time was 3:48.15. Federations could enter one athlete into the event if they met the "B" standard qualification time. For this event, the "B" standard qualification time was 3:56.14. Athletes could also enter the event if they had met an "A" or "B" standard in a different event and their Federation had not entered anyone else. Additional considerations applied to Federations who had few swimmers enter through the standard qualification times. Federations in this category could at least enter two men and two women to the competition, all of whom could enter into up to two events.

Top 10 fastest qualification times
Swimmer	Country	Time	Competition
Lukas Märtens	Germany	3:39.96	2025 Malmsten Swim Open Stockholm
Samuel Short	Australia	3:41.03	2025 Australian Trials
Elijah Winnington	Australia	3:41.41	2024 Australian Championships
Kim Woo-min	South Korea	3:42.42	2024 Mare Nostrum Tour (Monaco)
Guilherme Costa	Brazil	3:42.76	2024 Summer Olympics
Oliver Klemet	Germany	3:42.81	2024 Gothaer & friends meet
Felix Auböck	Austria	3:43.24	2024 European Championships
Rex Maurer	United States	3:43.33	2025 United States Championships
Fei Liwei	China	3:44.24	2024 Summer Olympics
Marco De Tullio	Italy	3:44.89	2025 Sette Colli Trophy

== Records ==
Prior to the competition, the existing world and championship records were as follows.

World record	Lukas Märtens (GER)	3:39.96	Stockholm, Sweden	12 April 2025
Competition record	Paul Biedermann (GER)	3:40.07	Rome, Italy	26 July 2009

== Heats ==
The heats took place at 10:20. Bulgaria's Petar Mitsin won the third heat with the fourth fastest qualifying time of 3:45.01, Australia's Samuel Short won the fourth heat with the fastest qualifying time of 3:42.07, and Germany's Lukas Märtens won the fifth and final heat with the second fastest qualifying time of 3:43.81. Australia's Elijah Winnington and the US's Rex Maurer, along with 2024 Olympic finalists Guilherme Costa and Fei Liwei, did not qualify.

Rank	Heat	Lane	Name	Nationality	Time	Notes
1	4	4	Samuel Short	Australia	3:42.07	Q
2	5	4	Lukas Märtens	Germany	3:43.81	Q
3	4	5	Kim Woo-min	South Korea	3:44.99	Q
4	3	7	Petar Mitsin	Bulgaria	3:45.01	Q
5	5	1	Zhang Zhanshuo	China	3:45.04	Q
6	5	9	Victor Johansson	Sweden	3:45.26	Q, NR
7	4	3	Oliver Klemet	Germany	3:45.72	Q
8	5	2	Marco De Tullio	Italy	3:45.88	Q
9	3	8	Ethan Ekk	Canada	3:46.01	
10	5	5	Elijah Winnington	Australia	3:46.37	
11	5	6	Rex Maurer	United States	3:46.38	
12	4	7	Lucas Henveaux	Belgium	3:46.68	
13	5	0	Zalán Sárkány	Hungary	3:46.82	
14	3	6	Jack McMillan	Great Britain	3:47.28	
15	3	0	Krzysztof Chmielewski	Poland	3:47.55	
16	5	8	Daniel Wiffen	Ireland	3:47.57	
17	4	0	Dimitrios Markos	Greece	3:47.59	
18	4	8	Stephan Steverink	Brazil	3:47.93	
19	3	4	Kazushi Imafuku	Japan	3:48.69	
20	3	3	Ilia Sibirtsev	Uzbekistan	3:48.75	
21	4	2	Kristóf Rasovszky	Hungary	3:48.84	
22	5	3	Guilherme Costa	Brazil	3:48.94	
23	4	1	David Aubry	France	3:49.13	
24	4	9	Antonio Djakovic	Switzerland	3:49.14	
25	4	6	Fei Liwei	China	3:49.68	
26	3	2	Sašo Boškan	Slovenia	3:49.86	
27	3	9	Yoav Romano	Israel	3:51.01	
28	3	5	Khiew Hoe Yean	Malaysia	3:51.11	
29	3	1	Juan Morales	Colombia	3:51.24	
30	2	5	Kristupas Trepočka	Lithuania	3:51.34	
31	2	3	Milan Vojtko	Slovakia	3:51.97	
32	2	7	Glen Lim	Singapore	3:54.97	
33	2	4	Marin Mogić	Croatia	3:56.15	
34	2	1	Gian Santos	Philippines	3:57.86	
35	2	0	Kevin Teixeira	Andorra	3:59.00	
36	5	7	Luka Mijatovic	United States	3:59.68	
37	2	6	Aryan Nehra	India	4:00.39	
38	2	8	Suleyman Ismayilzada	Azerbaijan	4:01.33	
39	2	2	Matthew Caldwell	South Africa	4:01.45	
40	2	9	Alberto Vega	Costa Rica	4:06.17	
41	1	4	Xavier Ventura	El Salvador	4:07.60	
42	1	5	Vladimir Hernández Mojarrieta	Cuba	4:11.70	
43	1	3	Binura Thalagala	Sri Lanka	4:16.80	

== Final ==
The final took place at 19:02.

Rank	Lane	Name	Nationality	Time	Notes
1st place, gold medalist(s)	5	Lukas Märtens	Germany	3:42.35	
2nd place, silver medalist(s)	4	Samuel Short	Australia	3:42.37	
3rd place, bronze medalist(s)	3	Kim Woo-min	South Korea	3:42.60	
4	7	Victor Johansson	Sweden	3:44.68	NR
5	2	Zhang Zhanshuo	China	3:44.82	
6	8	Marco De Tullio	Italy	3:44.92	
7	6	Petar Mitsin	Bulgaria	3:45.28	
8	1	Oliver Klemet	Germany	3:46.86	
