= Sweden at the 2025 World Aquatics Championships =

- Flag of Sweden
- World Aquatics code: SWE
- National federation: Swedish Swimming Federation
- Website: svensksimidrott.se (in Swedish)

in Singapore
- Competitors: 16 in 3 sports
- Medals: Gold 0 Silver 0 Bronze 0 Total 0

World Aquatics Championships appearances (overview)
- 1973; 1975; 1978; 1982; 1986; 1991; 1994; 1998; 2001; 2003; 2005; 2007; 2009; 2011; 2013; 2015; 2017; 2019; 2022; 2023; 2024; 2025

Sweden competed at the 2025 World Aquatics Championships in Singapore from July 11 to August 3, 2025.

== Competitors ==
The following is the list of competitors in the Championships.

Sport	Men	Women	Total
Artistic swimming	1	0	1
Diving	2	2	4
Swimming	5	6	11
Total	8	8	16

== Artistic swimming ==
Men

Athlete	Event	Preliminaries		Final	
Athlete	Event	Points	Rank	Points	Rank
David Martinez	Solo technical routine	—		195.0033	11
David Martinez	Solo free routine	—		164.7187	11

== Diving ==
Men

Athlete	Event	Preliminaries		Semifinals		Final	
Athlete	Event	Points	Rank	Points	Rank	Points	Rank
David Ekdahl	1 m springboard	257.25	49	—		Did not advance	
David Ekdahl	3 m springboard	283.80	58	Did not advance			
Elias Petersen	1 m springboard	294.40	37	—		Did not advance	
Elias Petersen	3 m springboard	336.00	42	Did not advance			

Women

Athlete	Event	Preliminaries		Semifinals		Final	
Athlete	Event	Points	Rank	Points	Rank	Points	Rank
Nina Janmyr	1 m springboard	220.20	23	—		Did not advance	
Nina Janmyr	3 m springboard	205.10	42	Did not advance			
Elna Widerström	1 m springboard	253.40	6 Q	—		234.60	11
Elna Widerström	3 m springboard	249.80	27	Did not advance			
Nina Janmyr; Elna Widerström	3 m synchro springboard	188.61	20	—		Did not advance	

Mixed

Athlete	Event	Final	
Athlete	Event	Points	Rank
Elias Petersen; Nina Janmyr	3 m synchro springboard	221.34	16

== Swimming ==
Sweden entered 11 swimmers.

Men

Athlete	Event	Heat		Semi-final		Final	
Athlete	Event	Time	Rank	Time	Rank	Time	Rank
Robin Hanson	100 m freestyle	48.97	31	Did not advance			
Robin Hanson	200 m freestyle	1:46.96	18	Did not advance			
Victor Johansson	400 m freestyle	3:45.26 NR	6 Q	—		3:44.68 NR	4
Victor Johansson	800 m freestyle	7:44.81 NR	5 Q	—		7:47.00	5
Victor Johansson	1500 m freestyle	15:06.17	13	—		Did not advance	
Daniel Kertes	50 m breaststroke	27.73	35	Did not advance			
Daniel Kertes	100 m breaststroke	1:02.34	43	Did not advance			
Elias Persson	50 m freestyle	22.27	32	Did not advance			
Erik Persson	200 m breaststroke	2:11.34	16 Q	2:10.85	13	Did not advance	

Women

Athlete	Event	Heat		Semi-final		Final	
Athlete	Event	Time	Rank	Time	Rank	Time	Rank
Sofia Åstedt	50 m freestyle	25.31	26	Did not advance			
Sofia Åstedt	100 m freestyle	54.47	20	Did not advance			
Sofia Åstedt	200 m freestyle	1:59.82	28	Did not advance			
Thilda Häll	400 m freestyle	4:16.07	21	—		Did not advance	
Thilda Häll	800 m freestyle	8:52.60	26	—		Did not advance	
Thilda Häll	1500 m freestyle	16:52.74	23	—		Did not advance	
Sophie Hansson	50 m breaststroke	30.71	15 Q	30.47	10	Did not advance	
Sophie Hansson	100 m breaststroke	1:07.67	28	Did not advance			
Louise Hansson	50 m butterfly	26.04	18	Did not advance			
Louise Hansson	100 m butterfly	58.64	22	Did not advance			
Sara Junevik	50 m butterfly	25.59	6 Q	25.65	10	Did not advance	
Sara Junevik	100 m butterfly	58.46	18	Did not advance			
Hanna Rosvall	50 m backstroke	28.57	27	Did not advance			
Hanna Rosvall	100 m backstroke	1:01.23	22	Did not advance			
Hanna Rosvall; Sophie Hansson; Louise Hansson; Sofia Åstedt	4 × 100 m medley relay	4:00.31	11	—		Did not advance	

Mixed

Athlete	Event	Heat		Final	
Athlete	Event	Time	Rank	Time	Rank
Robin Hanson; Elias Persson; Louise Hansson; Sofia Åstedt	4 × 100 m freestyle relay	3:26.41	13	Did not advance	
Hanna Rosvall; Erik Persson; Louise Hansson; Robin Hanson	4 × 100 m medley relay	3:46.91	13	Did not advance	
