= Kyrgyzstan at the 2025 World Aquatics Championships =

- Flag of Kyrgyzstan
- World Aquatics code: KGZ
- National federation: Kyrgyz Republic Swimming Federation

in Singapore
- Competitors: 2 in 1 sport
- Medals Ranked 27th: Gold 0 Silver 0 Bronze 1 Total 1

World Aquatics Championships appearances
- 1994; 1998; 2001; 2003; 2005; 2007; 2009; 2011; 2013; 2015; 2017; 2019; 2022; 2023; 2024; 2025

Other related appearances
- Soviet Union (1973–1991)

Kyrgyzstan is competing at the 2025 World Aquatics Championships in Singapore from 11 July to 3 August 2025.

== Medalists ==
| Medal | Name | Sport | Event | Date |
|---|---|---|---|---|
| Bronze | Denis Petrashov | Swimming | Men's 100 m breaststroke | 28 July |

Medals by sport
| Sport | 1st place, gold medalist(s) | 2nd place, silver medalist(s) | 3rd place, bronze medalist(s) | Total |
| Swimming | 0 | 0 | 1 | 1 |
| Total | 0 | 0 | 1 | 1 |

== Competitors ==
The following is the list of competitors in the Championships.

| Sport | Men | Women | Total |
|---|---|---|---|
| Swimming | 1 | 1 | 2 |
| Total | 1 | 1 | 2 |

== Swimming ==
Men

| Athlete | Event | Heat | | Semifinal | | Final | |
| Athlete | Event | Time | Rank | Time | Rank | Time | Rank |
|---|---|---|---|---|---|---|---|
| Denis Petrashov | 50 m breaststroke | 27.31 | 23 | Did not advance | | | |
| Denis Petrashov | 100 m breaststroke | 59.53 | 8 Q | 59.20 NR | 7 Q | 58.88 NR | 3rd place, bronze medalist(s) |
| Denis Petrashov | 200 m breaststroke | 2:11.68 | 19 | Did not advance | | | |

Women

| Athlete | Event | Heat | | Semifinal | | Final | |
| Athlete | Event | Time | Rank | Time | Rank | Time | Rank |
|---|---|---|---|---|---|---|---|
| Aiymkyz Aidaralieva | 100 m freestyle | 1:01.45 | 61 | Did not advance | | | |
| Aiymkyz Aidaralieva | 200 m freestyle | 2:14.18 | 45 | Did not advance | | | |
