= Croatia at the 2025 World Aquatics Championships =

- Croatia
- World Aquatics code: CRO

in Singapore
- Competitors: 50 in 5 sports
- Medals: Gold 0 Silver 0 Bronze 0 Total 0

World Aquatics Championships appearances
- 1994; 1998; 2001; 2003; 2005; 2007; 2009; 2011; 2013; 2015; 2017; 2019; 2022; 2023; 2024; 2025

Other related appearances
- Yugoslavia (1973–1991)

Croatia are competing at the 2025 World Aquatics Championships in Singapore from July 11 to August 3, 2025.

== Athletes by discipline ==
The following is the number of competitors who will participate at the Championships per discipline.

Sport	Men	Women	Total
Artistic swimming	0	3	3
Diving	4	0	4
Open water swimming	2	1	3
Swimming	10	1	11
Water polo	15	15	30
Total	30	20	50

== Artistic swimming ==
Women

Athlete	Event	Preliminaries		Final	
Athlete	Event	Points	Rank	Points	Rank
Mia Piri	Solo technical routine	197.9467	26	Did not advance	
Matea Butorac	Solo free routine	195.0713	17	Did not advance	
Korina Maretić; Mia Piri	Duet technical routine	223.1858	27	Did not advance	
Korina Maretić; Mia Piri	Duet free routine	200.3586	22	Did not advance	

== Diving ==
Men

Athlete	Event	Preliminaries		Semi-finals		Final	
Athlete	Event	Points	Rank	Points	Rank	Points	Rank
Mikula Miočić	1 m springboard	263.20	47	—		Did not advance	
Matej Nevešćanin	1 m springboard	334.40	18	—		Did not advance	
Marko Huljev	3 m springboard	283.10	59	Did not advance			
Matej Nevešćanin	3 m springboard	DNS					
Luka Martinović; Matej Nevešćanin	3 m synchronized springboard	337.44	16	—		Did not advance	

== Open water swimming ==
Men

Athlete	Event	Heats		Semifinal		Final	
Athlete	Event	Time	Rank	Time	Rank	Time	Rank
Marin Mugić	Men's 5 km	—				DNF	
Grgo Mujan	Men's 5 km	—				1:03:55.5	56

Women

Athlete	Event	Heats		Semifinal		Final	
Athlete	Event	Time	Rank	Time	Rank	Time	Rank
Klara Bošnjak	Women's 5 km	—				1:08:55.6	39

== Swimming ==
Men

Athlete	Event	Heat		Semi-final		Final	
Athlete	Event	Time	Rank	Time	Rank	Time	Rank
Luka Čarapović	100 m backstroke	55.84	39	Did not advance			
Jere Hribar	50 m freestyle	21.86	13 Q	21.79	11	Did not advance	
Jere Hribar	100 m freestyle	48.34	17	Did not advance			
Niko Janković	200 m freestyle	1:48.74	35	Did not advance			
Nikola Miljenić	50 m backstroke	25.91	46	Did not advance			
Nikola Miljenić	50 m butterfly	23.87	36	Did not advance			
Marin Mogić	400 m freestyle	3:56.15	33	—		Did not advance	
Marin Mogić	1500 m freestyle	15:36.12	17	—		Did not advance	
Filip Mujan	100 m breaststroke	1:01.42	35	Did not advance			
Filip Mujan	200 m breaststroke	2:11.53	18	Did not advance			
Božo Puhalović	50 m freestyle	22.28	34	Did not advance			
Vili Sivec	100 m butterfly	53.01	36	Did not advance			
Jere Hribar; Nikola Miljenić; Vlaho Nenadić; Toni Dragoja	4 × 100 m freestyle relay	3:14.02	14	—		Did not advance	
Luka Čarapović; Filip Mujan; Vili Sivec; Jere Hribar	4 × 100 m medley relay	3:36.39	18	—		Did not advance	

Women

Athlete	Event	Heat		Semi-final		Final	
Athlete	Event	Time	Rank	Time	Rank	Time	Rank
Amina Kajtaz	100 m butterfly	59.18	24	Did not advance			
Amina Kajtaz	200 m butterfly	2:12.60	19	Did not advance			

== Water polo ==
Summary

Team	Event	Group stage				Quarterfinals	Semifinals	Placement matches	
Team	Event	Opposition Score	Opposition Score	Opposition Score	Rank	Opposition Score	Opposition Score	Opposition Score	Rank
Croatia men's team	Women's tournament	China; W 25–6	Montenegro; W 13–11	Greece; W 10–9	1 Q	Hungary; L 12–18	United States; W 14–9	Montenegro; W 19–13	5
Croatia women's team	Women's tournament	Japan; L 12–25	Greece; L 7–31	Hungary; L 6–22	4 Q	—	South Africa; W 16–6	Argentina; W 16–14	13

=== Men's tournament ===
Croatia men's team qualified by winning the silver medal at the 2024 Summer Olympics in Paris, France.

Team roster

- Marko Bihač
- Matias Biljaka
- Tin Brubnjak
- Luka Bukić
- Rino Burić
- Zvonimir Butić
- Loren Fatović
- Konstantin Kharkov
- Filip Kržić
- Franko Lazić
- Luka Lončar
- Toni Popadić
- Josip Vrlić
- Ante Vukičević
- Marko Žuvela

Group play

Pos	Team	Pld	W	PSW	PSL	L	GF	GA	GD	Pts	Qualification
1	Croatia	3	3	0	0	0	48	26	+22	9	Quarterfinals
2	Montenegro	3	2	0	0	1	34	30	+4	6	Playoffs
3	Greece	3	1	0	0	2	44	25	+19	3	Playoffs
4	China	3	0	0	0	3	19	64	−45	0	13–16th place semifinals

Source: Omegatiming
Rules for classification: 1) points; 2) head-to-head points; 3) head-to-head goal difference; 4) head-to-head number of goals scored; 5) Goal difference.

12 July 2025; 12:10	Report	China	6–25	Croatia	OCBC Aquatic Centre, Singapore; Referees: Mihai Balanescu (ROU), Nicholas Hodgers (AUS)
12 July 2025; 12:10	Report	Score by quarters: 1–7, 0–5, 4–7, 1–6			OCBC Aquatic Centre, Singapore; Referees: Mihai Balanescu (ROU), Nicholas Hodgers (AUS)
12 July 2025; 12:10	Report	Xie 2	Goals	Bukić 6	OCBC Aquatic Centre, Singapore; Referees: Mihai Balanescu (ROU), Nicholas Hodgers (AUS)

14 July 2025; 17:35	Report	Croatia	13–11	Montenegro	OCBC Aquatic Centre, Singapore; Referees: Michiel Zwart (NED), Ivan Raković (SRB)
14 July 2025; 17:35	Report	Score by quarters: 3–2, 2–3, 3–2, 5–4			OCBC Aquatic Centre, Singapore; Referees: Michiel Zwart (NED), Ivan Raković (SRB)
14 July 2025; 17:35	Report	Bukić, Fatović 3	Goals	Banićević, Radović 3	OCBC Aquatic Centre, Singapore; Referees: Michiel Zwart (NED), Ivan Raković (SRB)

16 July 2025; 17:35	Report	Greece	9–10	Croatia	OCBC Aquatic Centre, Singapore; Referees: Nicholas Hodgers (AUS), David Gómez (ESP)
16 July 2025; 17:35	Report	Score by quarters: 4–1, 2–4, 1–4, 2–1			OCBC Aquatic Centre, Singapore; Referees: Nicholas Hodgers (AUS), David Gómez (ESP)
16 July 2025; 17:35	Report	Alafragkis, Kalogeropoulos 2	Goals	Fatović 3	OCBC Aquatic Centre, Singapore; Referees: Nicholas Hodgers (AUS), David Gómez (ESP)

Quarterfinals

20 July 2025; 20:45	Report	Croatia	12–18	Hungary	OCBC Aquatic Centre, Singapore; Referees: Michiel Zwart (NED), David Gómez (ESP)
20 July 2025; 20:45	Report	Score by quarters: 6–6, 1–5, 2–2, 3–5			OCBC Aquatic Centre, Singapore; Referees: Michiel Zwart (NED), David Gómez (ESP)
20 July 2025; 20:45	Report	Butić 4	Goals	Manhercz 4	OCBC Aquatic Centre, Singapore; Referees: Michiel Zwart (NED), David Gómez (ESP)

5th–8th place semifinals

22 July 2025; 20:00	Report	United States	9–14	Croatia	OCBC Aquatic Centre, Singapore; Referees: Zhang Liang (CHN), Ivan Raković (SRB)
22 July 2025; 20:00	Report	Score by quarters: 1–2, 1–5, 5–3, 2–4			OCBC Aquatic Centre, Singapore; Referees: Zhang Liang (CHN), Ivan Raković (SRB)
22 July 2025; 20:00	Report	C. Dodd, Vavic 2	Goals	Burić 3	OCBC Aquatic Centre, Singapore; Referees: Zhang Liang (CHN), Ivan Raković (SRB)

5th place match

24 July 2025; 20:00	Report	Montenegro	13–19	Croatia	OCBC Aquatic Centre, Singapore; Referees: Frank Ohme (GER), Scott Volz (GER)
24 July 2025; 20:00	Report	Score by quarters: 3–3, 3–2, 2–8, 5–6			OCBC Aquatic Centre, Singapore; Referees: Frank Ohme (GER), Scott Volz (GER)
24 July 2025; 20:00	Report	Gardašević 3	Goals	Zuvela 5	OCBC Aquatic Centre, Singapore; Referees: Frank Ohme (GER), Scott Volz (GER)

=== Women's tournament ===
Croatia's women's water polo team qualified by being in the top 3 not already qualified at the European Championships in Eindhoven, Netherlands.

Team roster

- Magdalena Butić
- Jelena Butić
- Ana Desnica
- Nina Eterović
- Ria Glas
- Neli Janković
- Nina Jazvin
- Nina Maria Medić
- Latica Medvešek
- Roza Pešić
- Iva Rožić
- Matea Skelin
- Lara Srhoj
- Aurora Stipanov
- Natasha Trojan

Group play

Pos	Team	Pld	W	PSW	PSL	L	GF	GA	GD	Pts	Qualification
1	Hungary	3	3	0	0	0	65	28	+37	9	Quarterfinals
2	Greece	3	2	0	0	1	65	32	+33	6	Playoffs
3	Japan	3	1	0	0	2	53	70	−17	3	Playoffs
4	Croatia	3	0	0	0	3	25	78	−53	0	13–16th place semifinals

Source: Omegatiming
Rules for classification: 1) points; 2) head-to-head points; 3) head-to-head goal difference; 4) head-to-head number of goals scored; 5) Goal difference.

11 July 2025; 16:00	Report	Japan	25–12	Croatia	OCBC Aquatic Centre, Singapore; Referees: Fiona Haigh (AUS), Zhang Liang (CHN)
11 July 2025; 16:00	Report	Score by quarters: 7–3, 4–3, 11–5, 3–1			OCBC Aquatic Centre, Singapore; Referees: Fiona Haigh (AUS), Zhang Liang (CHN)
11 July 2025; 16:00	Report	Arima 7	Goals	Rožić 4	OCBC Aquatic Centre, Singapore; Referees: Fiona Haigh (AUS), Zhang Liang (CHN)

13 July 2025; 13:45	Report	Croatia	7–31	Greece	OCBC Aquatic Centre, Singapore; Referees: Alessia Ferrari (ITA), Ivan Raković (SRB)
13 July 2025; 13:45	Report	Score by quarters: 1–9, 4–7, 1–7, 1–8			OCBC Aquatic Centre, Singapore; Referees: Alessia Ferrari (ITA), Ivan Raković (SRB)
13 July 2025; 13:45	Report	Srhoj 3	Goals	Tricha 5	OCBC Aquatic Centre, Singapore; Referees: Alessia Ferrari (ITA), Ivan Raković (SRB)

15 July 2025; 20:45	Report	Croatia	6–22	Hungary	OCBC Aquatic Centre, Singapore; Referees: Fiona Haigh (AUS), Frank Ohme (GER)
15 July 2025; 20:45	Report	Score by quarters: 2–9, 2–5, 1–5, 1–3			OCBC Aquatic Centre, Singapore; Referees: Fiona Haigh (AUS), Frank Ohme (GER)
15 July 2025; 20:45	Report	Rožić 4	Goals	Garda, Keszthelyi 4	OCBC Aquatic Centre, Singapore; Referees: Fiona Haigh (AUS), Frank Ohme (GER)

13th–16th place semifinals

17 July 2025; 10:35	Report	Croatia	16–6	South Africa	OCBC Aquatic Centre, Singapore; Referees: Alessia Ferrari (ITA), Maxim Gerasimov (GBR)
17 July 2025; 10:35	Report	Score by quarters: 7–2, 2–3, 2–0, 5–1			OCBC Aquatic Centre, Singapore; Referees: Alessia Ferrari (ITA), Maxim Gerasimov (GBR)
17 July 2025; 10:35	Report	Janković 4	Goals	Meecham 2	OCBC Aquatic Centre, Singapore; Referees: Alessia Ferrari (ITA), Maxim Gerasimov (GBR)

13th place match

19 July 2025; 10:35	Report	Argentina	14–16	Croatia	OCBC Aquatic Centre, Singapore; Referees: Dasch Barber (RSA), Ivan Raković (SRB)
19 July 2025; 10:35	Report	Score by quarters: 2–3, 2–2, 4–5, 4–2 PSO: 2–4			OCBC Aquatic Centre, Singapore; Referees: Dasch Barber (RSA), Ivan Raković (SRB)
19 July 2025; 10:35	Report	Bacigalupo 4	Goals	Rožić 3	OCBC Aquatic Centre, Singapore; Referees: Dasch Barber (RSA), Ivan Raković (SRB)
