= Swimming at the 2025 World Aquatics Championships – Women's 800 metre freestyle =

Women's 800 metre freestyle at the 2025 World Aquatics Championships
- Venue: World Aquatics Championships Arena
- Location: Singapore Sports Hub, Kallang
- Dates: 1 August (heats); 2 August (final)
- Competitors: 30 from 23 nations
- Winning time: 8:05.62

Medalists
gold medal	Katie Ledecky	United States
silver medal	Lani Pallister	Australia
bronze medal	Summer McIntosh	Canada

The women's 800 metre freestyle event at the 2025 World Aquatics Championships was held from 1 to 2 August 2025 at the World Aquatics Championships Arena at the Singapore Sports Hub in Kallang, Singapore.

== Background ==
The event was expected to feature a duel between Katie Ledecky of the United States and Summer McIntosh of Canada, who were both in career-best form. The Guardian wrote that the event was "set to be the defining moment" of the Championships, and that it "could signal a passing of the torch" from the older Ledecky to the younger McIntosh. CBC Sports commented that the race "looks like a classic sports story: the rising superstar vs. the wily veteran".

Ledecky had broken her own world record at the Fort Lauderdale stop of the 2025 TYR Pro Swim Series with 8:04.12 and had swum 8:05.76 at United States Nationals. She also held the championship record of 8:07.39, set at the 2015 World Championships. McIntosh, who had swum 8:05.07 at Canadian Trials to become the second-fastest performer in history, had improved her best by over four seconds in 2025.

Lani Pallister of Australia, who recorded 8:10.84 at Australian Trials to rank third all-time, was the leading contender for bronze. Also in contention were Li Bingjie of China, Simona Quadarella of Italy, Claire Weinstein of the United States, Isabel Gose of Germany, and Anastasiya Kirpichnikova of France, all with best times between 8:13 and 8:18.

== Qualification ==
Each National Federation was permitted to enter a maximum of two qualified athletes in each individual event, but they could do so only if both of them had attained the "A" standard qualification time. For this event, the "A" standard qualification time was 8:34.62. Federations could enter one athlete into the event if they met the "B" standard qualification time. For this event, the "B" standard qualification time was 8:52.63. Athletes could also enter the event if they had met an "A" or "B" standard in a different event and their Federation had not entered anyone else. Additional considerations applied to Federations who had few swimmers enter through the standard qualification times. Federations in this category could at least enter two men and two women to the competition, all of whom could enter into up to two events.

Top 10 fastest qualification times (Note: Only including swimmers who were on the start list for this event)
Swimmer	Country	Time	Competition
Katie Ledecky	United States	8:04.12	2025 TYR Pro Swim Series (Fort Lauderdale)
Summer McIntosh	Canada	8:05.07	2025 Canadian Trials
Lani Pallister	Australia	8:10.84	2025 Australian Trials
Simona Quadarella	Italy	8:14.55	2024 Summer Olympics
Isabel Gose	Germany	8:17.82	2024 Summer Olympics
Anastasiya Kirpichnikova	France	8:19.63	2024 Summer Olympics
Claire Weinstein	United States	8:19.67	2025 United States Championships
Li Bingjie	China	8:20.68	2025 Chinese Championships
Erika Fairweather	New Zealand	8:21.67	2025 New Zealand Championships
Sofia Diakova	Neutral Athletes B	8:24.93	2025 Russian Championships

== Heats ==
The heats took place on 1 August at 12:11. Ledecky swam the fastest qualifying time of 8:14.62, Pallister swam the second fastest time with 8:17.06, and McIntosh swam the third fastest time of 8:19.88.

Rank	Heat	Lane	Swimmer	Nation	Time	Notes
1	3	4	Katie Ledecky	United States	8:14.62	Q
2	3	5	Lani Pallister	Australia	8:17.06	Q
3	2	4	Summer McIntosh	Canada	8:19.88	Q
4	3	3	Isabel Gose	Germany	8:20.21	Q
5	2	5	Simona Quadarella	Italy	8:20.47	Q
6	3	2	Erika Fairweather	New Zealand	8:22.22	Q
7	2	6	Li Bingjie	China	8:23.23	Q
8	2	7	Ichika Kajimoto	Japan	8:27.51	Q
9	3	1	Yang Peiqi	China	8:27.89	
10	3	8	Caitlin Deans	New Zealand	8:28.72	
11	2	3	Anastasiya Kirpichnikova	France	8:28.97	
12	3	7	Moesha Johnson	Australia	8:30.85	
13	2	9	Gan Ching Hwee	Singapore	8:31.36	NR
14	2	2	Sofia Diakova	Neutral Athletes B	8:33.16	
15	2	8	Maya Werner	Germany	8:35.28	
16	2	1	Ksenia Misharina	Neutral Athletes B	8:35.94	
17	3	6	Claire Weinstein	United States	8:38.70	
18	1	3	Kristel Kobrich	Chile	8:39.78	
19	1	4	Artemis Vasilaki	Greece	8:42.72	
20	2	0	Vivien Jackl	Hungary	8:43.29	
21	3	9	Viktória Mihályvári-Farkas	Hungary	8:46.46	
22	3	0	Gabrielle Roncatto	Brazil	8:48.32	
23	1	6	Kim Chae-yun	South Korea	8:48.92	
24	1	5	Diana Durães	Portugal	8:49.84	
25	1	1	Catherine van Rensburg	South Africa	8:50.60	
26	1	7	Thilda Häll	Sweden	8:52.60	
27	1	0	Jamila Boulakbech	Tunisia	8:54.75	
28	1	8	Anna Kalandadze	Georgia	8:55.29	
29	1	2	Delfina Dini	Argentina	8:58.17	
30	1	9	Harper Barrowman	Cayman Islands	9:21.03	

== Final ==
The final took place on 2 August at 20:21.

Rank	Lane	Name	Nationality	Time	Notes
1st place, gold medalist(s)	4	Katie Ledecky	United States	8:05.62	CR
2nd place, silver medalist(s)	5	Lani Pallister	Australia	8:05.98	OC
3rd place, bronze medalist(s)	3	Summer McIntosh	Canada	8:07.29	
4	2	Simona Quadarella	Italy	8:12.81	ER
5	1	Li Bingjie	China	8:15.59	
6	6	Isabel Gose	Germany	8:18.23	
7	7	Erika Fairweather	New Zealand	8:20.79	
8	8	Ichika Kajimoto	Japan	8:26.85	
