= New Zealand at the 2025 World Aquatics Championships =

- Flag of New Zealand
- World Aquatics code: NZL
- National federation: Swimming New Zealand
- Website: swimmingnz.org

in Singapore
- Competitors: 32 in 6 sports
- Medals: Gold 0 Silver 0 Bronze 0 Total 0

World Aquatics Championships appearances
- 1973; 1975; 1978; 1982; 1986; 1991; 1994; 1998; 2001; 2003; 2005; 2007; 2009; 2011; 2013; 2015; 2017; 2019; 2022; 2023; 2024; 2025

New Zealand competed at the 2025 World Aquatics Championships in Singapore from July 11 to August 3, 2025.

== Competitors ==
The following is the list of competitors in the Championships.

Sport	Men	Women	Total
Artistic swimming	0	1	1
Diving	3	1	4
High diving	1	0	1
Open water swimming	1	0	1
Swimming	3	8	11
Water polo	0	14	14
Total	8	24	32

== Artistic swimming ==
Women

Athlete	Event	Preliminaries		Final	
Athlete	Event	Points	Rank	Points	Rank
Jennifer Russanov	Solo technical routine	204.0442	24	Did not advance	
Jennifer Russanov	solo free routine	180.2101	21	Did not advance	

== Diving ==
Men

Athlete	Event	Preliminaries		Semifinals		Final	
Athlete	Event	Points	Rank	Points	Rank	Points	Rank
Nathan Brown	10 m platform	354.50	28	Did not advance			
Liam Stone	1 m springboard	349.80	13	—		Did not advance	
Liam Stone	3 m springboard	416.95	8 Q	417.00	8 Q	430.45	10
Frazer Tavener	3 m springboard	360.95	25	Did not advance			
Liam Stone; Frazer Tavener	3 m synchro springboard	375.66	6 Q	—		361.11	7

Women

Athlete	Event	Preliminaries		Semifinals		Final	
Athlete	Event	Points	Rank	Points	Rank	Points	Rank
Maggie Squire	1 m springboard	167.30	49	—		Did not advance	

Mixed

Athlete	Event	Final	
Athlete	Event	Points	Rank
Nathan Brown; Frazer Tavener; Maggie Squire	Team event	266.25	18

== High diving ==
Athlete	Event	Points	Rank
Braden Rumpit	Men's high diving	321.20	13

== Open water swimming ==
Men

Athlete	Event	Heat		Semi-final		Final	
Athlete	Event	Time	Rank	Time	Rank	Time	Rank
Louis Clark	Men's 3 km knockout sprints	17:58.4	19	Did not advance			

== Swimming ==
New Zealand entered 11 swimmers.

Men

Athlete	Event	Heat		Semi-final		Final	
Athlete	Event	Time	Rank	Time	Rank	Time	Rank
Lewis Clareburt	200 m butterfly	1:56.35	16 Q	1:55.24	10	Did not advance	
Lewis Clareburt	200 m individual medley	1:58.19	9 Q	1:57.29	6 Q	1:57.06 NR	5
Lewis Clareburt	400 m individual medley	4:13.89	10	—		Did not advance	
Finn Harland	50 m backstroke	24.76	10 Q	25.02	16	Did not advance	
Finn Harland	100 m backstroke	54.17	22	Did not advance			
Andrew Jeffcoat	50 m backstroke	25.09	27	Did not advance			

Women

Athlete	Event	Heat		Semi-final		Final							
Athlete	Event	Time	Rank	Time	Rank	Time	Rank						
Caitlin Deans	800 m freestyle	8:28.72	10	—		Did not advance							
Caitlin Deans	1500 m freestyle	16:13.16	13	—		Did not advance							
Erika Fairweather	200 m freestyle	1:56.54	1 Q	1:55.52	3 Q	1:55.61	6						
Erika Fairweather	400 m freestyle	Disqualified		—		Did not advance							
Erika Fairweather	800 m freestyle	8:22.22	6 Q	—		8:20.79	7						
Amber George	50 m backstroke	28.54	25	Did not advance									
Amber George	100 m backstroke	1:02.16	29	Did not advance									
Savannah-Eve Martin	50 m backstroke	28.74	29	Did not advance									
Zoe Pedersen	50 m butterfly	26.39	24	Did not advance									
Laura Quilter	50 m freestyle	25.08	22	Did not advance									
Laura Quilter	50 m butterfly	26.60	29	Did not advance									
Milana Tapper	100 m freestyle	55.23	28	Did not advance									
Milana Tapper	200 m freestyle	1:58.75	21	Did not advance -				Eve Thomas	400 m freestyle	4:10.10	14	—	Did not advance
1500 m freestyle	16:28.10	16	Did not advance					Eve Thomas				—	

== Water polo ==
Summary

Team	Event	Group stage				Playoff	Quarterfinal	Semi-final	Final / BM	
Team	Event	Opposition Score	Opposition Score	Opposition Score	Rank	Opposition Score	Opposition Score	Opposition Score	Opposition Score	Rank
New Zealand	Women's tournament	Italy; L 9–14	Singapore; W 22–7	Australia; L 6–15	3 P/Off	Netherlands; L 9–14	—	Great Britain; W 20–12	China; L 6–10	10

=== Women's tournament ===
Team roster

The following is the New Zealander roster.

Head coach: Angela Winstanley-Smith

- 1 Jessica Milicich GK
- 2 Emily Nicholson FP
- 3 Gabrielle Doyle FP
- 4 Libby Gault FP
- 5 Gabrielle Milicich FP
- 6 Darcy Spark FP
- 7 Emmerson Houghton FP
- 8 Millie Quin FP
- 9 Sophie Shorter-Robinson FP
- 10 Morgan McDowall FP
- 11 Kaitlin Howarth FP
- 12 Agatha Weston FP
- 13 Bridget Layburn GK
- 14 Holly Dunn FP

Group play

Pos	Team	Pld	W	PSW	PSL	L	GF	GA	GD	Pts	Qualification
1	Australia	3	3	0	0	0	68	23	+45	9	Quarterfinals
2	Italy	3	2	0	0	1	61	33	+28	6	Playoffs
3	New Zealand	3	1	0	0	2	37	36	+1	3	Playoffs
4	Singapore (H)	3	0	0	0	3	14	88	−74	0	13–16th place semifinals

Source: Omegatiming
Rules for classification: 1) points; 2) head-to-head points; 3) head-to-head goal difference; 4) head-to-head number of goals scored; 5) Goal difference.
(H) Host

11 July 2025; 17:35	Report	Italy	14–9	New Zealand	OCBC Aquatic Centre, Singapore; Referees: Aurély Blanchard (FRA), Tamás Kovács-Csatlós (HUN)
11 July 2025; 17:35	Report	Score by quarters: 1–2, 3–4, 5–2, 5–1			OCBC Aquatic Centre, Singapore; Referees: Aurély Blanchard (FRA), Tamás Kovács-Csatlós (HUN)
11 July 2025; 17:35	Report	three players 3	Goals	Weston 2	OCBC Aquatic Centre, Singapore; Referees: Aurély Blanchard (FRA), Tamás Kovács-Csatlós (HUN)

13 July 2025; 19:10	Report	New Zealand	22–7	Singapore	OCBC Aquatic Centre, Singapore; Referees: Maxim Gerasimov (GBR), Evan Andrews (CAN)
13 July 2025; 19:10	Report	Score by quarters: 8–2, 5–1, 3–2, 6–2			OCBC Aquatic Centre, Singapore; Referees: Maxim Gerasimov (GBR), Evan Andrews (CAN)
13 July 2025; 19:10	Report	McDowall 8	Goals	Tio 4	OCBC Aquatic Centre, Singapore; Referees: Maxim Gerasimov (GBR), Evan Andrews (CAN)

15 July 2025; 17:35	Report	Australia	15–6	New Zealand	OCBC Aquatic Centre, Singapore; Referees: Tamás Kovács-Csatlós (HUN), Marta Cabanas (ESP)
15 July 2025; 17:35	Report	Score by quarters: 4–0, 3–2, 5–1, 3–3			OCBC Aquatic Centre, Singapore; Referees: Tamás Kovács-Csatlós (HUN), Marta Cabanas (ESP)
15 July 2025; 17:35	Report	three players 3	Goals	Houghton 3	OCBC Aquatic Centre, Singapore; Referees: Tamás Kovács-Csatlós (HUN), Marta Cabanas (ESP)

Playoffs

17 July 2025; 17:35	Report	New Zealand	9–14	Netherlands	OCBC Aquatic Centre, Singapore; Referees: Wu Zhekang (SGP), Germán Moller (ARG)
17 July 2025; 17:35	Report	Score by quarters: 1–3, 2–5, 4–5, 2–1			OCBC Aquatic Centre, Singapore; Referees: Wu Zhekang (SGP), Germán Moller (ARG)
17 July 2025; 17:35	Report	Quin 3	Goals	Van de Kraats 5	OCBC Aquatic Centre, Singapore; Referees: Wu Zhekang (SGP), Germán Moller (ARG)

9–12th place semifinals

19 July 2025; 13:45	Report	New Zealand	20–12	Great Britain	OCBC Aquatic Centre, Singapore; Referees: Tamás Kovács-Csatlós (HUN), Marcella Braga (BRA)
19 July 2025; 13:45	Report	Score by quarters: 5–3, 7–3, 5–1, 3–5			OCBC Aquatic Centre, Singapore; Referees: Tamás Kovács-Csatlós (HUN), Marcella Braga (BRA)
19 July 2025; 13:45	Report	Quin 5	Goals	Turner 4	OCBC Aquatic Centre, Singapore; Referees: Tamás Kovács-Csatlós (HUN), Marcella Braga (BRA)

Eleventh place game

21 July 2025; 10:35	Report	China	10–6	New Zealand	OCBC Aquatic Centre, Singapore; Referees: Aurély Blanchard (FRA), Maxim Gerasimov (GBR)
21 July 2025; 10:35	Report	Score by quarters: 4–2, 2–1, 0–1, 4–2			OCBC Aquatic Centre, Singapore; Referees: Aurély Blanchard (FRA), Maxim Gerasimov (GBR)
21 July 2025; 10:35	Report	four players 2	Goals	McDowall 5	OCBC Aquatic Centre, Singapore; Referees: Aurély Blanchard (FRA), Maxim Gerasimov (GBR)
