= Swimming at the 2025 World Aquatics Championships – Women's 50 metre breaststroke =

Women's 50 metre breaststroke at the 2025 World Aquatics Championships
- Venue: World Aquatics Championships Arena
- Location: Singapore Sports Hub, Kallang
- Dates: 2 August (heats and semifinals); 3 August (final)
- Competitors: 59 from 55 nations
- Winning time: 29.55

Medalists
gold medal	Rūta Meilutytė	Lithuania
silver medal	Tang Qianting	China
bronze medal	Benedetta Pilato	Italy

The women's 50 metre breaststroke event at the 2025 World Aquatics Championships was held from 2 to 3 August 2025 at the World Aquatics Championships Arena at the Singapore Sports Hub in Kallang, Singapore.

== Background ==
Lithuania’s Rūta Meilutytė, the reigning world record holder and three-time defending champion, was the favourite to win the event. Meilutytė had set the current world mark of 29.16 at the 2023 Championships and had dominated the event since returning to swimming in 2022. Italy’s Benedetta Pilato, a former record holder and four-time Worlds medalist in this event, had returned her focus to the 50-metre event after emphasizing the 100 in past seasons. Estonia’s 18-year-old Eneli Jefimova led the 2025 world rankings and had been improving her times at the senior level following two prior World Championship finals. The United States’ Lilly King, a consistent sub-30 performer and two-time world champion in this event, made her final individual appearance before retirement. China’s Tang Qianting, the 2024 Worlds silver medalist, was also among the key contenders.

== Qualification ==
Each National Federation was permitted to enter a maximum of two qualified athletes in each individual event, but they could do so only if both of them had attained the "A" standard qualification time. For this event, the "A" standard qualification time was 30.75 seconds. Federations could enter one athlete into the event if they met the "B" standard qualification time. For this event, the "B" standard qualification time was 31.83 seconds. Athletes could also enter the event if they had met an "A" or "B" standard in a different event and their Federation had not entered anyone else. Additional considerations applied to Federations who had few swimmers enter through the standard qualification times. Federations in this category could at least enter two men and two women to the competition, all of whom could enter into up to two events.

Top 10 fastest qualification times
Swimmer	Country	Time	Competition
Benedetta Pilato	Italy	29.59	2024 Campionato Italiano Assoluto
Tang Qianting	China	29.64	2024 Chinese Championships
Eneli Jefimova	Estonia	29.83	2025 Helsinki Swim Meet
Lilly King	United States	29.88	2025 United States Championships
McKenzie Siroky	United States	30.05	2025 United States Championships
Tatjana Smith	South Africa	30.09	2024 South African Championships
Anita Bottazzo	Italy	30.15	2025 Canadian Trials
Lara van Niekerk	South Africa	30.16	2024 South African Championships
Rūta Meilutytė	Lithuania	30.18	2025 Malmsten Swim Open Stockholm
Anna Elendt	Germany	30.28	Monaco stop of the 2025 Mare Nostrum Swim Tour

== Records ==
Prior to the competition, the existing world and championship records were as follows.

World record	Rūta Meilutytė (LTU)	29.16	Fukuoka, Japan	30 July 2023
Competition record	Rūta Meilutytė (LTU)	29.16	Fukuoka, Japan	30 July 2023

== Heats ==
The heats took place on 2 August at 10:52.

Rank	Heat	Lane	Name	Nationality	Time	Notes
1	6	3	Rūta Meilutytė	Lithuania	29.82	Q
2	4	4	Eneli Jefimova	Estonia	30.13	Q
3	5	4	Tang Qianting	China	30.15	Q
4	5	3	Anna Elendt	Germany	30.17	Q
5	6	8	Barbara Mazurkiewicz	Poland	30.22	Q, NR
6	4	6	Veera Kivirinta	Finland	30.36	Q
7	4	5	Anita Bottazzo	Italy	30.42	Q
8	6	4	Benedetta Pilato	Italy	30.46	Q
9	6	1	Yang Chang	China	30.54	Q
10	6	5	Lilly King	United States	30.59	Q
11	5	6	Anastasia Gorbenko	Israel	30.60	Q
12	5	7	Macarena Ceballos	Argentina	30.65	Q
13	6	7	Henrietta Fangli	Hungary	30.67	Q
13	4	1	Teya Nikolova	Bulgaria	30.67	Q, NR
15	6	6	Sophie Hansson	Sweden	30.71	Q
16	5	8	Sienna Toohey	Australia	30.76	Q
17	4	2	Silje Slyngstadli	Norway	30.80	S/off
17	5	5	McKenzie Siroky	United States	30.80	S/off
19	4	8	Alina Zmushka	Neutral Athletes A	30.82	
20	6	2	Dominika Sztandera	Poland	30.88	
21	4	3	Satomi Suzuki	Japan	30.91	
22	6	0	Alexanne Lepage	Canada	30.98	
27	3	3	Kaylene Corbett	South Africa	31.43	
28	4	0	Jimena Ruiz	Spain	31.50	
29	3	5	Andrea Podmaníková	Slovakia	31.56	
30	3	8	Phee Jinq En	Malaysia	31.78	
31	3	6	Mercedes Toledo	Venezuela	31.80	
32	6	9	Jenjira Srisaard	Thailand	31.83	
23	4	7	Kotryna Teterevkova	Lithuania	31.02	
24	5	0	Letitia Sim	Singapore	31.12	
25	5	2	Mona McSharry	Ireland	31.28	
26	5	1	Evgeniia Chikunova	Neutral Athletes B	31.34	
33	5	9	Adelaida Pchelintseva	Kazakhstan	31.86	
34	3	2	Ko Ha-ru	South Korea	31.99	
35	3	9	Melissa Rodríguez	Mexico	32.00	
36	3	1	Lynn El Hajj	Lebanon	32.25	
37	3	0	Chen Pui Lam	Macau	32.27	
38	3	4	Chiu Yi-chen	Chinese Taipei	32.60	
39	2	5	Imane Houda El Barodi	Morocco	32.68	
40	2	6	Jayla Pina	Cape Verde	33.26	NR
41	2	2	Lea Hojsted	Faroe Islands	33.38	
42	2	3	Valerie Tarazi	Palestine	33.39	
43	2	7	Stella Gjoka	Albania	33.61	NR
44	2	4	Alicia Kok Shun	Mauritius	34.40	
45	1	8	Maria Batallones	Northern Mariana Islands	34.53	NR
46	2	8	Sairy Escalante	Honduras	35.34	
47	2	1	Aminata Barrow	Gambia	35.70	
48	1	2	Maesha Saadi	Comoros	36.23	
49	1	7	Hareem Malik	Pakistan	37.11	
50	1	5	Tamsiri Christine Niyomxay	Laos	38.63	
51	1	0	Ceylia Djeutcha	Cameroon	40.92	
52	1	6	Skyla Connor	Saint Kitts and Nevis	42.19	
53	1	3	Oumou Sangafe	Mali	48.38	
—	1	1	Rosita Manana Bindang	Equatorial Guinea	Did not start	
—	1	4	Nadine Dju	Guinea-Bissau	Did not start	
—	2	0	Olamide Sam	Sierra Leone	Did not start	
—	3	7	Nikoletta Pavlopoulou	Greece	Did not start	
—	4	9	Lisa Mamié	Switzerland	Did not start	
—	2	9	Marie Mebelle Camara	Guinea	Disqualified	

=== Swim-off ===
The swim-off was started on 2 August at 12:28.

Rank	Lane	Name	Nationality	Time	Notes
1	4	Silje Slyngstadli	Norway	30.48	R1, NR
2	5	McKenzie Siroky	United States	30.56	R2

== Semifinals ==
The semifinals took place on 2 August at 19:27.

Rank	Heat	Lane	Swimmer	Nation	Time	Notes
1	2	4	Rūta Meilutytė	Lithuania	29.54	Q
2	2	5	Tang Qianting	China	30.04	Q
3	1	6	Benedetta Pilato	Italy	30.20	Q
4	1	2	Lilly King	United States	30.22	Q
5	1	4	Eneli Jefimova	Estonia	30.25	Q
6	2	7	Anastasia Gorbenko	Israel	30.30	Q, NR
7	2	6	Anita Bottazzo	Italy	30.31	Q
8	1	3	Veera Kivirinta	Finland	30.37	Q
9	1	5	Anna Elendt	Germany	30.40	
10	2	8	Sophie Hansson	Sweden	30.47	
11	2	3	Barbara Mazurkiewicz	Poland	30.54	
12	1	7	Macarena Ceballos	Argentina	30.56	NR
13	1	8	Sienna Toohey	Australia	30.58	
14	1	1	Henrietta Fangli	Hungary	30.81	
15	2	1	Teya Nikolova	Bulgaria	30.88	
16	2	2	Yang Chang	China	30.91	

== Final ==
The final took place on 3 August at 19:10.

Rank	Lane	Name	Nationality	Time	Notes
1st place, gold medalist(s)	4	Rūta Meilutytė	Lithuania	29.55	
2nd place, silver medalist(s)	5	Tang Qianting	China	30.03	
3rd place, bronze medalist(s)	3	Benedetta Pilato	Italy	30.14	
4	1	Anita Bottazzo	Italy	30.21	
5	6	Lilly King	United States	30.25	
6	2	Eneli Jefimova	Estonia	30.29	
7	7	Anastasia Gorbenko	Israel	30.45	
8	8	Veera Kivirinta	Finland	30.68	
