= Swimming at the 2025 World Aquatics Championships – Women's 200 metre freestyle =

Women's 200 metre freestyle at the 2025 World Aquatics Championships
- Venue: World Aquatics Championships Arena
- Location: Singapore Sports Hub, Kallang
- Dates: 29 July (heats and semifinals); 30 July (final)
- Competitors: 46 from 37 nations
- Winning time: 1:53.48

Medalists
gold medal	Mollie O'Callaghan	Australia
silver medal	Li Bingjie	China
bronze medal	Claire Weinstein	United States

The women's 200 metre freestyle event at the 2025 World Aquatics Championships was held from 30 to 31 July 2025 at the World Aquatics Championships Arena at the Singapore Sports Hub in Kallang, Singapore.

== Background ==
Mollie O’Callaghan of Australia was the favourite for the event, as she held the world’s fastest time in 2025 at 1:54.43. She was the defending world and Olympic champion. Siobhán Haughey of Hong Kong, a consistent finalist since 2017, also returned. Her best time from 2025 was 1:56.46.

Claire Weinstein and Erin Gemmell of the United States, Liu Yaxin of China, and Mary-Sophie Harvey of Canada are all medal contenders with season bests under 1:56. Jamie Perkins (Australia), Li Bingjie (China), and Freya Colbert (Great Britain) brought distance strength, and swimmers like Barbora Seemanová (Czech Republic), Erika Fairweather (New Zealand), Stephanie Balduccini (Brazil) aimed to reach the final.

== Qualification ==
Each National Federation was permitted to enter a maximum of two qualified athletes in each individual event, but they could do so only if both of them had attained the "A" standard qualification time in an approved qualification event. For this event, the "A" standard qualification time was 1:58.23 seconds. Federations could enter one athlete into the event if they met the "B" standard qualification time. For this event, the "B" standard qualification time was 2:02.37 seconds. Athletes could also enter the event if they had met an "A" or "B" standard in a different event and their Federation had not entered anyone else. Additional considerations applied to Federations who had few swimmers enter through the standard qualification times. Federations in this category could at least enter two men and two women to the competition, all of whom could enter into up to two events.

Top 10 fastest qualification times
Swimmer	Country	Time	Competition
Ariarne Titmus	Australia	1:52.23	2024 Australian Olympic Trials
Mollie O'Callaghan	Australia	1:52.48	2024 Australian Olympic Trials
Summer McIntosh	Canada	1:53.69	2024 Canadian Olympic Trials
Yang Junxuan	China	1:54.37	2024 Chinese Championships
Siobhán Haughey	Hong Kong	1:54.52	Texas stop of the 2024 TYR Pro Swim Series
Claire Weinstein	United States	1:54.88	2024 Summer Olympics
Lani Pallister	Australia	1:54.89	2025 Australian Trials
Katie Ledecky	United States	1:54.97	Texas stop of the 2024 TYR Pro Swim Series
Barbora Seemanová	Czech Republic	1:55.12	AP Race London 2024
Erin Gemmell	United States	1:55.23	2025 United States Championships

== Records ==
Prior to the competition, the existing world and championship records were as follows.

World record	Ariarne Titmus (AUS)	1:52.23	Brisbane, Australia	12 June 2024
Competition record	Mollie O'Callaghan (AUS)	1:52.85	Fukuoka, Japan	26 July 2023

== Heats ==
The heats took place on 29 July at 10:26.

Rank	Heat	Lane	Swimmer	Nation	Time	Notes
1	5	3	Erika Fairweather	New Zealand	1:56.54	Q
2	5	5	Erin Gemmell	United States	1:56.74	Q
3	5	4	Mollie O'Callaghan	Australia	1:57.04	Q
4	3	5	Jamie Perkins	Australia	1:57.08	Q
5	3	4	Barbora Seemanová	Czech Republic	1:57.13	Q
6	5	6	Liu Yaxin	China	1:57.33	Q
7	4	4	Claire Weinstein	United States	1:57.38	Q
8	3	2	Aimee Canny	South Africa	1:57.53	Q
8	3	3	Freya Colbert	Great Britain	1:57.53	Q
8	5	7	Ella Jansen	Canada	1:57.53	Q
11	4	3	Li Bingjie	China	1:57.57	Q
12	3	6	Lilla Minna Ábrahám	Hungary	1:57.65	Q
13	4	5	Mary-Sophie Harvey	Canada	1:57.72	Q
14	5	2	Maria Fernanda Costa	Brazil	1:57.94	Q
15	5	9	Jo Hyun-ju	South Korea	1:58.10	Q, NR
16	4	2	Stephanie Balduccini	Brazil	1:58.28	Q
17	3	8	Iris Julia Berger	Austria	1:58.54	
18	3	1	Nagisa Ikemoto	Japan	1:58.61	
19	4	6	Nikolett Pádár	Hungary	1:58.62	
20	5	0	Francisca Soares Martins	Portugal	1:58.67	
21	4	1	Milana Tapper	New Zealand	1:58.75	
22	5	8	Waka Kobori	Japan	1:59.06	
23	3	0	Lea Polonsky	Israel	1:59.11	
23	5	1	Snæfríður Jórunnardóttir	Iceland	1:59.11	
25	4	8	Bianca Nannucci	Italy	1:59.24	
26	3	7	Leah Schlosshan	Great Britain	1:59.40	
26	4	0	Maya Werner	Germany	1:59.40	
28	3	9	Sofia Åstedt	Sweden	1:59.82	
29	2	3	Elisabeth Ebbesen	Denmark	2:00.36	
30	2	5	Batbayaryn Enkhkhüslen	Mongolia	2:01.14	
31	2	4	Maria Victoria Yegres Cottin	Venezuela	2:01.15	
32	4	7	Janja Šegel	Slovenia	2:01.18	
33	2	7	Femke Spiering	Netherlands	2:01.20	
34	4	9	Wiktoria Guść	Poland	2:01.26	
35	2	6	Camille Henveaux	Belgium	2:02.37	
36	2	0	Kamonchanok Kwanmuang	Thailand	2:03.05	
37	2	9	Sasha Gatt	Malta	2:04.16	NR
38	2	8	Isabella Dieffenthaller	Trinidad and Tobago	2:05.58	
39	2	1	Andrea Becali	Cuba	2:07.65	
40	1	4	Harper Barrowman	Cayman Islands	2:08.28	
41	1	1	Hiruki de Silva	Sri Lanka	2:09.23	
42	1	5	Jehanara Nabi	Pakistan	2:09.88	
43	1	3	Bianca Mitchell	Antigua and Barbuda	2:11.40	
44	1	6	Duana Lama	Nepal	2:13.40	
45	1	7	Aiymkyz Aidaralieva	Kyrgyzstan	2:14.18	
46	1	2	Osiyokhon Redjapova	Uzbekistan	2:16.86	
	2	2	Gan Ching Hwee	Singapore	Did not start	

== Semifinals ==
The semifinals took place on 29 July at 20:12.

Rank	Heat	Lane	Swimmer	Nation	Time	Notes
1	2	6	Claire Weinstein	United States	1:54.69	Q
2	2	5	Mollie O'Callaghan	Australia	1:55.49	Q
3	2	4	Erika Fairweather	New Zealand	1:55.52	Q
4	2	3	Barbora Seemanová	Czech Republic	1:55.63	Q
5	1	5	Jamie Perkins	Australia	1:55.89	Q
6	2	2	Freya Colbert	Great Britain	1:55.91	Q
7	2	7	Li Bingjie	China	1:55.98	Q
8	1	4	Erin Gemmell	United States	1:56.03	Q
9	1	3	Liu Yaxin	China	1:56.37	
10	1	7	Lilla Minna Ábrahám	Hungary	1:56.70	
11	1	2	Ella Jansen	Canada	1:57.60	
12	1	6	Aimee Canny	South Africa	1:57.72	
13	1	8	Stephanie Balduccini	Brazil	1:57.87	
14	1	1	Maria Fernanda Costa	Brazil	1:58.43	
15	2	1	Mary-Sophie Harvey	Canada	1:58.57	
16	2	8	Jo Hyun-ju	South Korea	1:58.72	

== Final ==
The final took place on 30 July at 19:18.

Rank	Lane	Name	Nationality	Time	Notes
1st place, gold medalist(s)	5	Mollie O'Callaghan	Australia	1:53.48	
2nd place, silver medalist(s)	1	Li Bingjie	China	1:54.52	
3rd place, bronze medalist(s)	4	Claire Weinstein	United States	1:54.67	
4	7	Freya Colbert	Great Britain	1:55.06	NR
5	6	Barbora Seemanová	Czech Republic	1:55.20	
6	3	Erika Fairweather	New Zealand	1:55.61	
7	2	Jamie Perkins	Australia	1:56.55	
8	8	Erin Gemmell	United States	2:00.16	
