= Diving at the 2025 World Aquatics Championships – Men's synchronized 3 metre springboard =

Men's synchronized 3 metre springboard at the Diving at the 2025 World Aquatics Championships
- Venue: OCBC Aquatic Centre
- Location: Singapore
- Dates: 28 July (preliminaries and final)
- Competitors: 52 from 26 nations
- Teams: 26
- Winning points: 467.31

Medalists
gold medal	Wang Zongyuan; Zheng Jiuyuan	China
silver medal	Juan Celaya; Osmar Olvera	Mexico
bronze medal	Anthony Harding; Jack Laugher	Great Britain

The Men's synchronized 3 metre springboard competition at the 2025 World Aquatics Championships was held on 28 July 2025.

== Results ==
The preliminary round was started at 10:02. The final round was started at 16:02.

Green denotes finalists

Rank	Nation	Preliminary		Final	
Rank	Nation	Points	Rank	Points	Rank
1st place, gold medalist(s)	China; Wang Zongyuan; Zheng Jiuyuan	445.83	1	467.31	1
2nd place, silver medalist(s)	Mexico; Juan Celaya; Osmar Olvera	405.54	2	449.28	2
3rd place, bronze medalist(s)	Great Britain; Anthony Harding; Jack Laugher	394.29	3	405.33	3
4	Ukraine; Kirill Boliukh; Stanislav Oliferchyk	374.91	7	387.99	4
5	Italy; Lorenzo Marsaglia; Giovanni Tocci	371.58	8	375.60	5
6	United States; Grayson Campbell; Jack Ryan	382.68	5	374.82	6
7	New Zealand; Liam Stone; Frazer Tavener	375.66	6	361.11	7
8	Germany; Timo Barthel; Moritz Wesemann	388.62	4	319.89	8
9	France; Gwendal Bisch; Jules Bouyer	370.05	9	Did not advance	
10	South Korea; Shin Jung-whi; Yi Jae-gyeong	364.41	10	Did not advance	
11	Japan; Senri Ikuma; Haruki Suyama	362.91	11	Did not advance	
12	Neutral Athletes B Gennadii Fokin; Ilia Molchanov	358.80	12	Did not advance	
13	Poland; Kacper Lesiak; Andrzej Rzeszutek	348.60	13	Did not advance	
14	Spain; Juan Cortés; Max Liñan	342.42	14	Did not advance	
15	Canada; Tazman Abramowicz; Carson Paul	338.04	15	Did not advance	
16	Croatia; Luka Martinović; Matej Nevešćanin	337.44	16	Did not advance	
17	Dominican Republic; Frandiel Gómez; Jonathan Ruvalcaba	334.32	17	Did not advance	
18	Uzbekistan; Vyacheslav Kachanov; Igor Myalin	326.58	18	Did not advance	
19	Australia; Hudson Skinner; Benjamin Wilson	319.47	19	Did not advance	
20	Brazil; Luís Felipe Moura; Rafael Borges	318.18	20	Did not advance	
21	Malaysia; Nurqayyum Nazmi bin Mohamad Nazim; Yong Rui Jie	302.76	21	Did not advance	
22	Singapore; Max Lee; Ayden Ng	302.10	22	Did not advance	
23	Venezuela; Jesús González; Juan Travieso	298.65	23	Did not advance	
24	Georgia; Giorgi Tsulukidze; Aleksandre Tskhomelidze	291.42	24	Did not advance	
25	Kazakhstan; Nazar Kozhanov; Kirill Novikov	275.13	25	Did not advance	
26	India; Surajit Rajbanshi; Premson Yumnam	254.04	26	Did not advance	
