= South Korea at the 2025 World Aquatics Championships =

- Flag of South Korea
- World Aquatics code: KOR
- National federation: Korea Swimming Federation

in Singapore
- Competitors: 35 in 4 sports
- Medals Ranked 27th: Gold 0 Silver 0 Bronze 1 Total 1

World Aquatics Championships appearances
- 1973; 1975; 1978; 1982; 1986; 1991; 1994; 1998; 2001; 2003; 2005; 2007; 2009; 2011; 2013; 2015; 2017; 2019; 2022; 2023; 2024; 2025

South Korea competed at the 2025 World Aquatics Championships in Singapore from July 11 to August 3, 2025.

== Medalists ==
Medal	Name	Sport	Event	Date
3rd place, bronze medalist(s)	Kim Woo-min	Swimming	Men's 400 metre freestyle	27 July 2025

== Competitors ==
The following is the list of competitors in the Championships.

Sport	Men	Women	Total
Diving	3	5	8
High diving	1	0	1
Open water swimming	2	2	4
Swimming	10	12	22
Total	16	19	35

== Diving ==
Men

Athlete	Event	Preliminaries		Semifinals		Final	
Athlete	Event	Points	Rank	Points	Rank	Points	Rank
Kang Min-hyuk	1 m springboard	324.00	25	—		Did not advance	
Kang Min-hyuk	10 m platform	355.35	27	Did not advance			
Shin Jung-whi	3 m springboard	379.20	17 Q	347.35	17	Did not advance	
Shin Jung-whi	10 m platform	360.50	24	Did not advance			
Yi Jae-gyeong	1 m springboard	308.00	32	—		Did not advance	
Yi Jae-gyeong	3 m springboard	384.10	14 Q	384.90	15	Did not advance	
Shin Jung-whi; Yi Jae-gyeong	3 m synchro springboard	364.41	10	—		Did not advance	
Kang Min-hyuk; Shin Jung-whi	10 m synchro platform	356.64	10	—		Did not advance	

Women

Athlete	Event	Preliminaries		Semifinals		Final	
Athlete	Event	Points	Rank	Points	Rank	Points	Rank
Jung Da-yeon	1 m springboard	216.95	27	—		Did not advance	
Jung Da-yeon	3 m springboard	277.75	14 Q	226.30	18	Did not advance	
Kim Su-ji	1 m springboard	229.50	19	—		Did not advance	
Ko Hyeon-ju	10 m platform	241.95	28	Did not advance			
Lee Ye-joo	3 m springboard	197.15	44	Did not advance			
Moon Na-yun	10 m platform	280.00	14 Q	262.40	15	Did not advance	
Jung Da-yeon; Lee Ye-joo	3 m synchro springboard	229.53	13	—		Did not advance	
Ko Hyeon-ju; Moon Na-yun	10 m synchro platform	270.60	9	—		Did not advance	

Mixed

Athlete	Event	Final	
Athlete	Event	Points	Rank
Yi Jae-gyeong; Jung Da-yeon	3 m synchro springboard	228.72	14
Shin Jung-whi; Moon Na-yun	10 m synchro platform	259.62	10
Kang Min-hyuk; Lee Ye-joo; Moon Na-yun; Yi Jae-gyeong	Team event	323.00	15

== High diving ==
Athlete	Event	Points	Rank
Choi Byung-hwa	Men's high diving	211.80	21

== Open water swimming ==
Men

Athlete	Event	Heat		Semi-final		Final	
Athlete	Event	Time	Rank	Time	Rank	Time	Rank
Oh Se-beom	Men's 3 km knockout sprints	17:48.4	16	Did not advance			
Oh Se-beom	Men's 5 km	—				1:01:22.4	34
Oh Se-beom	Men's 10 km	—				2:11:33.9	41
Park Jae-hun	Men's 3 km knockout sprints	17:13.9	12	Did not advance			
Park Jae-hun	Men's 5 km	—				1:01:03.9	28
Park Jae-hun	Men's 10 km	—				Did not finish	

Women

Athlete	Event	Heat		Semi-final		Final	
Athlete	Event	Time	Rank	Time	Rank	Time	Rank
Hwang Ji-yeon	Women's 3 km knockout sprints	19:19.8	21	Did not advance			
Hwang Ji-yeon	Women's 5 km	—				1:11:42.7	48
Hwang Ji-yeon	Women's 10 km	—				2:22:18.8	41
Kim Sue-ah	Women's 3 km knockout sprints	20:07.5	23	Did not advance			
Kim Sue-ah	Women's 5 km	—				1:11:15.8	47
Kim Sue-ah	Women's 10 km	—				2:29:57.5	49

Mixed

Athlete	Event	Final	
Athlete	Event	Time	Rank
Oh Se-beom; Park Jae-hun; Kim Sue-ah; Hwang Ji-yeon	Team relay	1:16:01.0	17

== Swimming ==
South Korea entered 22 swimmers.

Men

Athlete	Event	Heat		Semi-final		Final	
Athlete	Event	Time	Rank	Time	Rank	Time	Rank
Cho Sung-jae	200 m breaststroke	2:11.13	14 Q	2:10.23	10	Did not advance	
Choi Dong-yeol	50 m breaststroke	27.13	13 Q	27.05	15	Did not advance	
Choi Dong-yeol	100 m breaststroke	59.99	17	Did not advance			
Hwang Sun-woo	100 m freestyle	47.94	8 Q	47.94	13	Did not advance	
Hwang Sun-woo	200 m freestyle	1:46.12	8 Q	1:44.84	2 Q	1:44.72	4
Ji Yu-chan	50 metre freestyle	21.80	9 Q	21.77; 21.66 AS	8 S/off; 1 Q	21.71	7
Ji Yu-chan	50 m butterfly	23.57	30	Did not advance			
Kim Young-beom	100 m freestyle	48.50	21	Did not advance			
Kim Woo-min	400 m freestyle	3:44.99	3 Q	—		3:42.60	3rd place, bronze medalist(s)
Kim Min-seop	200 m butterfly	1:56.34	15 Q	1:57.35	16	Did not advance	
Kim Min-seop	400 m individual medley	Disqualified		—		Did not advance	
Kim Min-suk	200 m individual medley	2:01.61	26	Did not advance			
Lee Ju-ho	100 m backstroke	53.79	17	Did not advance			
Lee Ju-ho	200 m backstroke	1:56.50	5 Q	1:55.70 NR	9	Did not advance	
Lee Ho-joon	200 m freestyle	1:47.36	21	Did not advance			
Kim Young-beom; Kim Woo-min; Lee Ho-joon; Hwang Sun-woo	4 × 200 m freestyle relay	7:04.68	3 Q	—		7:02.29	5
Lee Ju-ho; Choi Dong-yeol; Kim Young-beom; Hwang Sun-woo	4 × 100 m medley relay	3:32.54	8 Q	—		3:32.32	7

Women

Athlete	Event	Heat		Semi-final		Final	
Athlete	Event	Time	Rank	Time	Rank	Time	Rank
Hur Yeon-kyung	50 m freestyle	25.61	33	Did not advance			
Hur Yeon-kyung	100 m freestyle	55.58	31	Did not advance			
Jo Hyun-ju	200 m freestyle	1:58.10 NR	15 Q	1:58.72	16	Did not advance	
Kim Chae-yun	800 m freestyle	8:48.92	23	—		Did not advance	
Kim Chae-yun	1500 m freestyle	16:47.88	21	—		Did not advance	
Kim Do-yeon	100 m butterfly	59.78	29	Did not advance			
Kim Seung-won	50 m backstroke	27.75	7 Q	27.95	15	Did not advance	
Kim Seung-won	100 m backstroke	1:00.51	15 Q	1:00.54	16	Did not advance	
Kim Bo-min	400 m individual medley	4:51.55	19	—		Did not advance	
Ko Ha-ru	50 m breaststroke	31.99	34	Did not advance			
Ko Ha-ru	100 m breaststroke	1:08.46	32	Did not advance			
Lee Lee-na	50 m butterfly	27.01	34	Did not advance			
Lee Song-eun	200 m individual medley	2:16.87	29	Did not advance			
Park Si-eun	200 m breaststroke	2:26.74	15 Q	2:29.67	16	Did not advance	
Park Su-jin	200 m butterfly	2:10.17	16 Q	2:10.26	14	Did not advance	
Park Hee-kyung	400 m freestyle	4:12.86	18	—		Did not advance	
Jo Hyun-ju; Hur Yeonk-yung; Lee Lee-na; Kim Do-yeon	4 × 100 m freestyle relay	3:45.64	13	—		Did not advance	
Park Hee-kyung; Kim Bo-min; Park Su-jin; Jo Hyun-ju	4 × 200 m freestyle relay	8:01.11	9	—		Did not advance	
Kim Seung-won; Ko Ha-ru; Kim Do-yeon; Hur Yeon-kyung	4 × 100 m medley relay	4:04.36	15	—		Did not advance	
