= Uzbekistan at the 2025 World Aquatics Championships =

- Flag of Uzbekistan
- World Aquatics code: UZB
- National federation: Uzbekistan Swimming Federation

in Singapore
- Medals: Gold 0 Silver 0 Bronze 0 Total 0

World Aquatics Championships appearances
- 1994; 1998; 2001; 2003; 2005; 2007; 2009; 2011; 2013; 2015; 2017; 2019; 2022; 2023; 2024; 2025

Other related appearances
- Soviet Union (1973–1991)

Uzbekistan competed at the 2025 World Aquatics Championships in Singapore from July 11 to August 3, 2025.

== Competitors ==
The following is the list of competitors in the Championships.

Sport	Men	Women	Total
Artistic swimming	0	2	2
Diving	2	0	2
Swimming	2	2	4
Total	4	4	8

== Artistic swimming ==
Women

Athlete	Event	Preliminaries		Final	
Athlete	Event	Points	Rank	Points	Rank
Sabina Makhmudova	Solo technical routine	206.2250	23	Did not advance	
Sabina Makhmudova	Solo free routine	161.9862	22	Did not advance	
Sabina Makhmudova; Ziyodakhon Toshkhujaeva	Duet technical routine	241.7117	18	Did not advance	
Sabina Makhmudova; Ziyodakhon Toshkhujaeva	Duet free routine	197.0643	24	Did not advance	

== Diving ==
Men

Athlete	Event	Preliminaries		Semifinals		Final	
Athlete	Event	Points	Rank	Points	Rank	Points	Rank
Vyacheslav Kachanov	1 m springboard	302.40	34	—		Did not advance	
Vyacheslav Kachanov	3 m springboard	371.15	20	Did not advance			
Igor Myalin	3 m springboard	318.30	51	Did not advance			
Igor Myalin	10 m platform	343.95	32	Did not advance			
Vyacheslav Kachanov; Igor Myalin	3 m synchro springboard	326.58	18	—		Did not advance	

== Swimming ==
Uzbekistan entered 4 swimmers.

Men

Athlete	Event	Heat		Semi-final		Final	
Athlete	Event	Time	Rank	Time	Rank	Time	Rank
Ilia Sibirtsev	400 m freestyle	3:48.75	20	—		Did not advance	
Ilia Sibirtsev	800 m freestyle	7:51.98	12	—		Did not advance	
Ilia Sibirtsev	1500 m freestyle	15:30.66	16	—		Did not advance	
Eldor Usmonov	50 m butterfly	23.62	32	Did not advance			
Eldor Usmonov	100 m butterfly	52.46	31	Did not advance			

Women

Athlete	Event	Heat		Semi-final		Final	
Athlete	Event	Time	Rank	Time	Rank	Time	Rank
Parizod Abdukarimova	50 m backstroke	30.57	43	Did not advance			
Parizod Abdukarimova	100 m backstroke	1:08.48	52	Did not advance			
Osiyokhon Redjapova	100 m freestyle	1:01.66	63	Did not advance			
Osiyokhon Redjapova	200 m freestyle	2:16.86	46	Did not advance			
