= Diving at the 2025 World Aquatics Championships – Men's 3 metre springboard =

Men's 3 metre springboard at the Diving at the 2025 World Aquatics Championships
- Venue: OCBC Aquatic Centre
- Location: Singapore
- Dates: 31 July (preliminaries); 1 August (semifinal and final)
- Competitors: 65 from 40 nations
- Winning points: 529.55

Medalists
gold medal	Osmar Olvera	Mexico
silver medal	Cao Yuan	China
bronze medal	Wang Zongyuan	China

The Men's 3 metre springboard competition at the 2025 World Aquatics Championships was held on 31 July and 1 August 2025.

== Results ==
The preliminary round was started 31 July at 09:02. The semifinal was started on 1 August at 14:02. The final was started on 1 August at 17:32.

Green denotes finalists

Blue denotes semifinalists

Rank	Diver	Nationality	Preliminary		Semifinal		Final	
Rank	Diver	Nationality	Points	Rank	Points	Rank	Points	Rank
1st place, gold medalist(s)	Osmar Olvera	Mexico	451.90	2	472.50	3	529.55	1
2nd place, silver medalist(s)	Cao Yuan	China	447.15	3	512.15	2	522.70	2
3rd place, bronze medalist(s)	Wang Zongyuan	China	478.60	1	547.30	1	515.55	3
4	Jordan Houlden	Great Britain	441.85	5	461.60	4	492.10	4
5	Jules Bouyer	France	404.80	9	407.75	9	478.30	5
6	Moritz Wesemann	Germany	441.25	6	431.65	5	467.10	6
7	Nikita Shleikher	Neutral Athletes B	445.15	4	427.70	7	452.75	7
8	Luis Uribe	Colombia	418.10	7	429.55	6	443.25	8
9	Ilia Molchanov	Neutral Athletes B	394.80	11	397.05	11	440.25	9
10	Liam Stone	New Zealand	416.95	8	417.00	8	430.45	10
11	Sho Sakai	Japan	396.80	10	395.75	12	406.45	11
12	Jonathan Ruvalcaba	Dominican Republic	374.05	18	400.40	10	404.50	12
13	Collier Dyer	United States	381.75	15	393.05	13	Did not advance	
14	Carson Paul	Canada	391.75	12	392.65	14	Did not advance	
15	Yi Jae-gyeong	South Korea	384.10	14	384.90	15	Did not advance	
16	Mohamed Ahmed Farouk	Egypt	381.40	16	351.45	16	Did not advance	
17	Shin Jung-whi	South Korea	379.20	17	347.35	17	Did not advance	
18	Bohdan Chyzhovskyi	Ukraine	387.65	13	341.70	18	Did not advance	
19	Giovanni Tocci	Italy	374.00	19	Did not advance			
20	Vyacheslav Kachanov	Uzbekistan	371.15	20	Did not advance			
21	Max Liñan	Spain	368.00	21	Did not advance			
22	Avvir Tham	Singapore	363.90	22	Did not advance			
23	Juan Celaya	Mexico	362.75	23	Did not advance			
24	Matteo Santoro	Italy	361.65	24	Did not advance			
25	Frazer Tavener	New Zealand	360.95	25	Did not advance			
26	Jack Laugher	Great Britain	360.80	26	Did not advance			
27	Jake Passmore	Ireland	360.60	27	Did not advance			
28	Andrzej Rzeszutek	Poland	357.55	28	Did not advance			
29	Chawanwat Juntaphadawon	Thailand	357.00	29	Did not advance			
30	Gwendal Bisch	France	354.70	30	Did not advance			
31	Jesús González	Venezuela	353.15	31	Did not advance			
32	Kacper Lesiak	Poland	351.75	32	Did not advance			
33	Dariush Lotfi	Austria	347.25	33	Did not advance			
34	Maxwell Flory	United States	345.60	34	Did not advance			
35	Theofilos Afthinos	Greece	344.90	35	Did not advance			
36	Kirill Boliukh	Ukraine	344.60	36	Did not advance			
36	Martynas Lisauskas	Lithuania	344.60	36	Did not advance			
38	Sam Vajerhelabad	Iran	344.55	38	Did not advance			
39	Haruki Suyama	Japan	343.30	39	Did not advance			
40	Juan Cortés	Spain	340.30	40	Did not advance			
41	Frank Rosales	Cuba	339.75	41	Did not advance			
42	Elias Petersen	Sweden	336.00	42	Did not advance			
43	Hudson Skinner	Australia	329.10	43	Did not advance			
44	Max Lee	Singapore	326.25	44	Did not advance			
45	Nazar Kozhanov	Kazakhstan	324.55	45	Did not advance			
46	Timo Barthel	Germany	323.15	46	Did not advance			
47	Rafael Max	Brazil	323.05	47	Did not advance			
48	Alexandru Avasiloae	Romania	321.75	48	Did not advance			
49	Juan Travieso	Venezuela	319.40	49	Did not advance			
50	Tornike Onikashvili	Georgia	318.65	50	Did not advance			
51	Igor Myalin	Uzbekistan	318.30	51	Did not advance			
52	Isak Børslien	Norway	312.60	52	Did not advance			
53	Syafiq Puteh	Malaysia	310.55	53	Did not advance			
54	Nurqayyum Nazmi bin Mohamad Nazim	Malaysia	303.55	54	Did not advance			
55	Luís Felipe Moura	Brazil	299.65	55	Did not advance			
56	Frandiel Gómez	Dominican Republic	298.70	56	Did not advance			
57	Donato Neglia	Chile	284.40	57	Did not advance			
58	David Ekdahl	Sweden	283.80	58	Did not advance			
59	Marko Huljev	Croatia	283.10	59	Did not advance			
60	Surajit Rajbanshi	India	271.70	60	Did not advance			
61	Giorgi Tsulukidze	Georgia	265.45	61	Did not advance			
62	Curtis Yuen	Hong Kong	264.15	62	Did not advance			
63	Premson Yumnam	India	261.70	63	Did not advance			
64	Sebastian Konecki	Lithuania	258.85	64	Did not advance			
65	Robben Yiu	Hong Kong	222.50	65	Did not advance			
	Matej Nevešćanin	Croatia	Did not start					
