= Venezuela at the 2025 World Aquatics Championships =

- Flag of Venezuela
- World Aquatics code: VEN
- National federation: Venezuelan Water Sports Federation
- Website: feveda.org.ve (in Spanish)

in Singapore
- Competitors: 12 in 3 sports
- Medals: Gold 0 Silver 0 Bronze 0 Total 0

World Aquatics Championships appearances
- 1973; 1975; 1978; 1982; 1986; 1991; 1994; 1998; 2001; 2003; 2005; 2007; 2009; 2011; 2013; 2015; 2017; 2019; 2022; 2023; 2024; 2025

Venezuela competed at the 2025 World Aquatics Championships in Singapore from July 11 to August 3, 2025.

== Competitors ==
The following is the list of competitors in the Championships.

Sport	Men	Women	Total
Diving	2	1	3
Open water swimming	2	3	5
Swimming	1	3	4
Total	5	7	12

== Diving ==
Men

Athlete	Event	Preliminaries		Semifinals		Final	
Athlete	Event	Points	Rank	Points	Rank	Points	Rank
Jesús González	3 m springboard	353.15	31	Did not advance			
Jesús González	10 m platform	358.45	26	Did not advance			
Juan Travieso	1 m springboard	251.00	52	—		Did not advance	
Juan Travieso	3 m springboard	319.40	49	Did not advance			
Jesús González; Juan Travieso	3 m synchro springboard	298.65	23	—		Did not advance	

Women

Athlete	Event	Preliminaries		Semifinals		Final	
Athlete	Event	Points	Rank	Points	Rank	Points	Rank
Elizabeth Pérez	1 m springboard	215.75	29	—		Did not advance	

Mixed

Athlete	Event	Final	
Athlete	Event	Points	Rank
Jesús González; Elizabeth Pérez	3 m synchro springboard	236.28	11

== Open water swimming ==
Men

Athlete	Event	Heat		Semi-final		Final	
Athlete	Event	Time	Rank	Time	Rank	Time	Rank
Diego Vera	Men's 5 km	—				1:01:24.0	36
Diego Vera	Men's 10 km	—				Did not finish	
Ronaldo Zambrano	Men's 5 km	—				1:01:08.9	31
Ronaldo Zambrano	Men's 10 km	—				Did not finish	

Women

Athlete	Event	Heat		Semi-final		Final	
Athlete	Event	Time	Rank	Time	Rank	Time	Rank
Ruthseli Aponte	Women's 10 km	—				Did not finish	
Nathalie Medina	Women's 5 km	—				1:09:54.4	44
Daniela Suárez	Women's 5 km	—				1:11:42.8	50
Daniela Suárez	Women's 10 km	—				2:29:52.3	48

== Swimming ==
Venezuela entered 4 swimmers.

Men

Athlete	Event	Heat		Semi-final		Final	
Athlete	Event	Time	Rank	Time	Rank	Time	Rank
Jorge Otaiza	50 m butterfly	24.27	46	Did not advance			
Jorge Otaiza	100 m butterfly	53.91	45	Did not advance			

Women

Athlete	Event	Heat		Semi-final		Final	
Athlete	Event	Time	Rank	Time	Rank	Time	Rank
Lismar Lyon	50 m freestyle	25.63	34	Did not advance			
Lismar Lyon	50 m butterfly	26.30 NR	22	Did not advance			
Lismar Lyon	100 m butterfly	1:00.19	32	Did not advance			
Mercedes Toledo	50 m breaststroke	31.80	31	Did not advance			
Mercedes Toledo	100 m breaststroke	1:10.44	41	Did not advance			
Maria Yegres	200 m freestyle	2:01.15	31	Did not advance			
Maria Yegres	400 m freestyle	4:20.02	26	—		Did not advance	
