= Poland at the 2025 World Aquatics Championships =

- Flag of Poland
- World Aquatics code: POL
- National federation: Polish Swimming Federation
- Website: polswim.pl (in Polish)

in Singapore
- Competitors: 26 in 3 sports
- Medals Ranked 25th: Gold 0 Silver 1 Bronze 0 Total 1

World Aquatics Championships appearances
- 1973; 1975; 1978; 1982; 1986; 1991; 1994; 1998; 2001; 2003; 2005; 2007; 2009; 2011; 2013; 2015; 2017; 2019; 2022; 2023; 2024; 2025

Poland competed at the 2025 World Aquatics Championships in Singapore from July 11 to August 3, 2025.

== Medalists ==
Medal	Name	Sport	Event	Date
2nd place, silver medalist(s)	Krzysztof Chmielewski	Swimming	Men's 200 metre butterfly	30 July 2025

== Competitors ==
The following is the list of competitors in the Championships.

Sport	Men	Women	Total
Diving	2	3	5
Open water swimming	2	1	3
Swimming	10	8	38
Total	14	12	26

== Diving ==
Men

Athlete	Event	Preliminaries		Semifinals		Final	
Athlete	Event	Points	Rank	Points	Rank	Points	Rank
Kacper Lesiak	1 m springboard	334.35	19	—		Did not advance	
Kacper Lesiak	3 m springboard	351.75	32	Did not advance			
Andrzej Rzeszutek	1 m springboard	317.85	27	—		Did not advance	
Andrzej Rzeszutek	3 m springboard	357.55	28	Did not advance			
Kacper Lesiak; Andrzej Rzeszutek	3 m synchro springboard	348.60	13	—		Did not advance	

Women

Athlete	Event	Preliminaries		Semifinals		Final	
Athlete	Event	Points	Rank	Points	Rank	Points	Rank
Aleksandra Błażowska	1 m springboard	188.80	43	—		Did not advance	
Aleksandra Błażowska	3 m springboard	237.70	30	Did not advance			
Marysia Łukaszewicz	10 m platform	206.45	33	Did not advance			
Kaja Skrzek	1 m springboard	218.40	25	—		Did not advance	
Kaja Skrzek	3 m springboard	259.60	21	Did not advance			
Aleksandra Błażowska; Kaja Skrzek	3 m synchro springboard	239.40	11	—		Did not advance	

Mixed

Athlete	Event	Final	
Athlete	Event	Points	Rank
Andrzej Rzeszutek; Kaja Skrzek	3 m synchro springboard	250.44	9

== Open water swimming ==
Men

Athlete	Event	Heat		Semi-final		Final	
Athlete	Event	Time	Rank	Time	Rank	Time	Rank
Bartosz Kapała	Men's 3 km knockout sprints	17:14.2	16	Did not advance			
Bartosz Kapała	Men's 5 km	—				1:01:21.9	33
Bartosz Kapała	Men's 10 km	—				2:11:32.1	40
Piotr Woźniak	Men's 3 km knockout sprints	Did not start		Did not advance			
Piotr Woźniak	Men's 5 km	—				1:00:31.6	22
Piotr Woźniak	Men's 10 km	—				2:07:18.8	27

Women

Athlete	Event	Heat		Semi-final		Final	
Athlete	Event	Time	Rank	Time	Rank	Time	Rank
Klaudia Tarasiewicz	Women's 3 km knockout sprints	18:36.7	9 Q	12:18.2	14	Did not advance	
Klaudia Tarasiewicz	Women's 5 km	—				1:06:05.4	25
Klaudia Tarasiewicz	Women's 10 km	—				2:15:06.0	18

== Swimming ==
Poland entered 18 swimmers.

Men

Athlete	Event	Heat		Semi-final		Final	
Athlete	Event	Time	Rank	Time	Rank	Time	Rank
Krzysztof Chmielewski	400 m freestyle	3:47.55	15	—		Did not advance	
Krzysztof Chmielewski	200 m butterfly	1:52.89 NR	2 Q	1:53.61	2 Q	1:52.64 NR	2nd place, silver medalist(s)
Michał Chmielewski	200 m butterfly	1:54.68	7 Q	1:55.30	11	Did not advance	
Kacper Czapla	50 m butterfly	23.44	25	Did not advance			
Jan Kałusowski	50 m breaststroke	27.50	29	Did not advance			
Jan Kałusowski	200 m breaststroke	2:10.88	10 Q	2:11.84	16	Did not advance	
Piotr Ludwiczak	50 m freestyle	22.52	44	Did not advance			
Jakub Majerski	100 m butterfly	51.35	10 Q	51.40	14	Did not advance	
Ksawery Masiuk	50 m backstroke	24.89	15 Q	24.41 NR	4 Q	24.51	4
Ksawery Masiuk	100 m backstroke	52.82	8 Q	52.67	9	Did not advance	
Ksawery Masiuk	200 m backstroke	Did not start		Did not advance			
Ksawery Masiuk	100 m butterfly	51.79	21	Did not advance			
Kamil Sieradzki	100 m freestyle	48.49	20	Did not advance			
Kamil Sieradzki	200 m freestyle	1:46.31	12 Q	1:45.00 NR	3 Q	1:45.22	5
Dawid Wiekiera	100 m breaststroke	1:00.27	19	Did not advance			
Kamil Sieradzki; Jakub Majerski; Ksawery Masiuk; Karol Ostrowski	4 × 100 m freestyle relay	3:13.60	13	—		Did not advance	
Ksawery Masiuk; Dawid Wiekiera; Jakub Majerski; Kamil Sieradzki	4 × 100 m medley relay	3:32.83	10	—		Did not advance	

Women

Athlete	Event	Heat		Semi-final		Final	
Athlete	Event	Time	Rank	Time	Rank	Time	Rank
Laura Bernat	200 m backstroke	2:12.86	27	Did not advance			
Zuzanna Famulok	100 m butterfly	59.28	27	Did not advance			
Wiktoria Guść	200 m freestyle	2:01.26	34	Did not advance			
Aleksandra Knop	200 m backstroke	2:11.63	21	Did not advance			
Aleksandra Knop	400 m individual medley	4:48.12	15	—		Did not advance	
Barbara Mazurkiewicz	50 m breaststroke	30.22 NR	5 Q	30.54	11	Did not advance	
Adela Piskorska	50 m backstroke	28.56	26	Did not advance			
Adela Piskorska	100 m backstroke	1:00.72	17	Did not advance			
Dominika Sztandera	50 m breaststroke	30.88	20	Did not advance			
Dominika Sztandera	100 m breaststroke	1:06.85	12 Q	1:07.34	15	Did not advance	
Katarzyna Wasick	50 m freestyle	24.44	4 Q	24.19	1 Q	24.74	8
Katarzyna Wasick	100 m freestyle	Did not start		Did not advance			
Adela Piskorska; Barbara Mazurkiewicz; Zuzanna Famulok; Wiktoria Guść	4 × 100 m medley relay	4:05.40	16	—		Did not advance	

Mixed

Athlete	Event	Heat		Final	
Athlete	Event	Time	Rank	Time	Rank
Kamil Sieradzki; Karol Ostrowski; Zuzanna Famulok; Wiktoria Guść	4 × 100 m freestyle relay	3:29.26	17	Did not advance	
Ksawery Masiuk; Dominika Sztandera; Jakub Majerski; Katarzyna Wasick	4 × 100 m medley relay	3:44.22 NR	8 Q	3:44.27	8
