= Diving at the 2025 World Aquatics Championships – Men's 1 metre springboard =

Men's 1 metre springboard at the Diving at the 2025 World Aquatics Championships
- Venue: OCBC Aquatic Centre
- Location: Singapore
- Dates: 27 July (preliminaries and final)
- Competitors: 59 from 37 nations
- Winning points: 443.70

Medalists
gold medal	Zheng Jiuyuan	China
silver medal	Osmar Olvera	Mexico
bronze medal	Yan Siyu	China

The Men's 1 metre springboard competition at the 2025 World Aquatics Championships was held on 27 July 2025.

== Results ==
The preliminary round was started at 09:02. The final was held at 17:32.

Green denotes finalists

Rank	Diver	Nationality	Preliminary		Final	
Rank	Diver	Nationality	Points	Rank	Points	Rank
1st place, gold medalist(s)	Zheng Jiuyuan	China	428.00	1	443.70	1
2nd place, silver medalist(s)	Osmar Olvera	Mexico	366.95	6	429.60	2
3rd place, bronze medalist(s)	Yan Siyu	China	372.25	4	405.50	3
4	Jordan Houlden	Great Britain	407.45	2	405.15	4
5	Jules Bouyer	France	370.15	5	390.15	5
6	Moritz Wesemann	Germany	350.60	12	386.70	6
7	Lorenzo Marsaglia	Italy	381.30	3	383.70	7
8	Gennadii Fokin	Neutral Athlete B	359.75	8	381.00	8
9	Lou Massenberg	Germany	357.80	10	360.45	9
10	Jonathan Ruvalcaba	Dominican Republic	358.30	9	354.50	10
11	Giovanni Tocci	Italy	365.15	7	340.25	11
12	Bohdan Chyzhovskyi	Ukraine	351.00	11	316.40	12
13	Liam Stone	New Zealand	349.80	13	Did not advance	
14	Juan Celaya	Mexico	347.20	14	Did not advance	
15	Danylo Konovalov	Ukraine	343.75	15	Did not advance	
16	Nick Harris	United States	339.80	16	Did not advance	
17	Noah Penman	Great Britain	337.05	17	Did not advance	
18	Matej Nevešćanin	Croatia	334.40	18	Did not advance	
19	Kacper Lesiak	Poland	334.35	19	Did not advance	
20	Frank Rosales	Cuba	334.10	20	Did not advance	
21	Gwendal Bisch	France	332.55	21	Did not advance	
22	Donato Neglia	Chile	328.00	22	Did not advance	
23	Max Liñan	Spain	325.60	23	Did not advance	
24	Mohamed Ahmed Farouk	Egypt	324.50	24	Did not advance	
25	Kang Min-hyuk	South Korea	324.00	25	Did not advance	
26	Hudson Skinner	Australia	318.00	26	Did not advance	
27	Andrzej Rzeszutek	Poland	317.85	27	Did not advance	
28	Avvir Tham	Singapore	314.65	28	Did not advance	
29	Egor Lapin	Neutral Athlete B	313.40	29	Did not advance	
30	Martynas Lisauskas	Lithuania	311.25	30	Did not advance	
31	Alexandru Avasiloae	Romania	310.25	31	Did not advance	
32	Yi Jae-gyeong	South Korea	308.00	32	Did not advance	
33	Lyle Yost	United States	304.70	33	Did not advance	
34	Vyacheslav Kachanov	Uzbekistan	302.40	34	Did not advance	
35	Theofilos Afthinos	Greece	296.60	35	Did not advance	
36	Luís Felipe Moura	Brazil	294.90	36	Did not advance	
37	Elias Petersen	Sweden	294.40	37	Did not advance	
38	Tornike Onikashvili	Georgia	292.30	38	Did not advance	
39	Tazman Abramowicz	Canada	288.45	39	Did not advance	
40	Jonas Madsen	Denmark	285.45	40	Did not advance	
41	Yong Rui Jie	Malaysia	283.90	41	Did not advance	
42	Sebastian Konecki	Lithuania	279.85	42	Did not advance	
43	Nazar Kozhanov	Kazakhstan	276.70	43	Did not advance	
44	Nurqayyum Nazmi bin Mohamad Nazim	Malaysia	274.35	44	Did not advance	
45	Frandiel Gómez	Dominican Republic	270.90	45	Did not advance	
46	Rafael Max	Brazil	269.40	46	Did not advance	
47	Mikula Miočić	Croatia	263.20	47	Did not advance	
48	Max Lee	Singapore	261.00	48	Did not advance	
49	David Ekdahl	Sweden	257.25	49	Did not advance	
50	Curtis Yuen	Hong Kong	257.00	50	Did not advance	
51	Chawanwat Juntaphadawon	Thailand	254.50	51	Did not advance	
52	Benjamin Wilson	Australia	253.70	52	Did not advance	
53	Juan Travieso	Venezuela	251.00	53	Did not advance	
54	Aleksandre Tskhomelidze	Georgia	248.40	54	Did not advance	
55	Sam Vajerhelabad	Iran	242.85	55	Did not advance	
56	Surajit Rajbanshi	India	238.80	56	Did not advance	
57	Robben Yiu	Hong Kong	236.35	57	Did not advance	
58	Tsvetomir Ereminov	Bulgaria	232.60	58	Did not advance	
59	Premson Yumnam	India	219.15	59	Did not advance	
—	Senri Ikuma	Japan	Did not start			
