= Swimming at the 2025 World Aquatics Championships – Women's 400 metre freestyle =

Women's 400 metre freestyle at the 2025 World Aquatics Championships
- Venue: World Aquatics Championships Arena
- Location: Singapore Sports Hub, Kallang
- Dates: 27 July
- Competitors: 30 from 23 nations
- Winning time: 3:56.26

Medalists
gold medal	Summer McIntosh	Canada
silver medal	Li Bingjie	China
bronze medal	Katie Ledecky	United States

The women's 400 metre freestyle event at the 2025 World Aquatics Championships was held on 27 July 2025 at the World Aquatics Championships Arena at the Singapore Sports Hub in Kallang, Singapore.

== Background ==
Summer McIntosh of Canada and Katie Ledecky of the United States are the clear favorites, with the Olympic champion Ariarne Titmus absent. Titmus ended her competitive swimming career in October of that year. McIntosh holds the world record at 3:54.18, set at Canadian Trials, over two seconds faster than Ledecky’s 3:56.81 best time of 2025. Ledecky won their only head-to-head this season but trails McIntosh in recent best times.

The contest for bronze includes Lani Pallister of Australia (3:59.72), Li Bingjie of China (3:59.99), Claire Weinstein of the United States (4:00.05), and Erika Fairweather of New Zealand, a 2023 bronze medalist. Other returning finalists include Isabel Gose of Germany, Maria Fernanda Costa of Brazil, Jamie Perkins of Australia, and Yang Peiqi of China.

== Qualification ==
Each National Federation was permitted to enter a maximum of two qualified athletes in each individual event, but they could do so only if both of them had attained the "A" standard qualification time. For this event, the "A" standard qualification time was 4:10.23. Federations could enter one athlete into the event if they met the "B" standard qualification time. For this event, the "B" standard qualification time was 4:18.99. Athletes could also enter the event if they had met an "A" or "B" standard in a different event and their Federation had not entered anyone else. Additional considerations applied to Federations who had few swimmers enter through the standard qualification times. Federations in this category could at least enter two men and two women to the competition, all of whom could enter into up to two events.

Top 10 fastest qualification times
Swimmer	Country	Time	Competition
Summer McIntosh	Canada	3:54.18	2025 Canadian Trials
Ariarne Titmus	Australia	3:55.44	2024 Australian Olympic Trials
Katie Ledecky	United States	3:56.81	Fort Lauderdale stop of the 2025 TYR Pro Swim Series
Lani Pallister	Australia	3:59.72	2025 Australian Swimming Trials
Li Bingjie	China	3:59.99	2025 Chinese Championships
Claire Weinstein	United States	4:00.05	2025 United States Championships
Erika Fairweather	New Zealand	4:01.12	2024 Summer Olympics
Paige Madden	United States	4:02.08	2024 United States Olympic Trials
Isabel Gose	Germany	4:02.14	2024 Summer Olympics
Yang Peiqi	China	4:02.53	2025 Chinese Championships

== Records ==
Prior to the competition, the existing world and championship records were as follows.

World record	Summer McIntosh (CAN)	3:54.18	Victoria, Canada	7 June 2025
Competition record	Ariarne Titmus (AUS)	3:55.38	Fukuoka, Japan	23 July 2023

== Heats ==
The heats were started at 11:40.

Rank	Heat	Lane	Name	Nationality	Time	Notes
1	3	4	Katie Ledecky	United States	4:01.04	Q
2	4	5	Lani Pallister	Australia	4:02.36	Q
3	3	5	Li Bingjie	China	4:03.11	Q
3	4	4	Summer McIntosh	Canada	4:03.11	Q
5	3	6	Yang Peiqi	China	4:03.36	Q
6	4	2	Jamie Perkins	Australia	4:04.39	Q
7	4	6	Isabel Marie Gose	Germany	4:05.07	Q
8	4	7	Maya Werner	Germany	4:06.75	Q
9	3	2	Maria Fernanda Costa	Brazil	4:07.32	
10	3	1	Sofia Diakova	Neutral Athletes B	4:08.65	
11	3	7	Miyu Namba	Japan	4:08.72	
12	3	0	Ichika Kajimoto	Japan	4:08.79	
13	2	5	Gan Ching Hwee	Singapore	4:09.81	NR
14	4	1	Eve Thomas	New Zealand	4:10.10	
15	4	9	Francisca Martins	Portugal	4:10.16	
16	4	8	Gabrielle Roncatto	Brazil	4:10.37	
17	4	0	Ella Jansen	Canada	4:11.01	
18	2	3	Park Hee-kyung	South Korea	4:12.86	
19	3	8	Anastasiya Kirpichnikova	France	4:13.92	
20	3	9	Bettina Fábián	Hungary	4:14.31	
21	2	8	Thilda Häll	Sweden	4:16.07	
22	2	2	Delfina Dini	Argentina	4:16.81	
23	2	4	Camille Henveaux	Belgium	4:16.93	
24	1	4	Sasha Gatt	Malta	4:19.36	
25	2	6	Batbayaryn Enkhkhüslen	Mongolia	4:19.80	
26	2	7	María Yegres	Venezuela	4:20.02	
27	2	1	Hannah Robertson	South Africa	4:22.69	
28	1	5	Kyra Rabess	Cayman Islands	4:23.08	NR
29	1	3	Jehanara Nabi	Pakistan	4:35.88	
	3	3	Erika Fairweather	New Zealand	Disqualified	
	4	3	Claire Weinstein	United States	Did not start	

== Final ==
The final took place at 19:33.

Rank	Lane	Name	Nationality	Time	Notes
1st place, gold medalist(s)	6	Summer McIntosh	Canada	3:56.26	
2nd place, silver medalist(s)	3	Li Bingjie	China	3:58.21	AS
3rd place, bronze medalist(s)	4	Katie Ledecky	United States	3:58.49	
4	5	Lani Pallister	Australia	3:58.87	
5	1	Isabel Marie Gose	Germany	4:02.90	
6	7	Jamie Perkins	Australia	4:03.20	
7	2	Yang Peiqi	China	4:06.47	
8	8	Maya Werner	Germany	4:09.38	
