= Open water swimming at the 2025 World Aquatics Championships – Men's 10 km =

Men's 10 km at the 2025 World Aquatics Championships
- Venue: Sentosa Island
- Location: Singapore
- Dates: 16 July
- Competitors: 78 from 47 nations
- Winning time: 1:59:55.5

Medalists
gold medal	Florian Wellbrock	Germany
silver medal	Gregorio Paltrinieri	Italy
bronze medal	Kyle Lee	Australia

The men's 10 km competition at the 2025 World Aquatics Championships was held on 16 July 2025. Going into the event, the top contenders were Kristóf Rasovszky, Dávid Betlehem, Oliver Klemet, Florian Wellbrock, Gregorio Paltrinieri and Marc-Antoine Olivier. The event was postponed from the morning of 16 July to 13:00 SGT on the same day due to water quality issues.

The race consisted of six 1.67 km (1.04 mi) laps off the coast of Palawan Beach, Sentosa, Singapore. The water was warm, and several swimmers retired from the race for medical reasons.

Hungary's Kristóf Rasovszky and Germany's Florian Wellbrock led during the first two laps, before Wellbrock led through most of the third and fourth laps. During the fifth lap, a leading group consisting of Wellbrock, Germany's Klemet, Italy's Paltrinieri and Australia's Kyle Lee broke away from the rest of the field. During the final 400 metres, Wellbrock maintained a lead of a few seconds, Paltrinieri held second, and Lee and Klemet raced for bronze. Wellbrock won with a time of 1:59:55.5, Paltrinieri came second with 1:59:59.2, and Lee finished third with 2:00:10.3, hundredths of a second ahead of Klemet, who finished fourth.

The win gave Wellbrock his seventh world title in open water swimming and his eighth world title in swimming in general. It was Paltrinieri's 17th World Championships medal, and it was Lee's first individual medal at an international event.

== Background ==
Hungary's Kristóf Rasovszky, the silver medallist at the 2020 Olympics and gold medallist at the 2024 Olympics, was competing after winning gold at the 2025 European Open Water Swimming Championships. His compatriot Dávid Betlehem, also a 2024 Olympic medallist, had collected multiple 5 km podium finishes in 2025. Germany's Oliver Klemet, the 2024 Olympic bronze medallist, had swum fast pool times complementing his 2025 Open Water Swimming World Cup podium finish. Germany's Florian Wellbrock, Olympic champion in 2020 and world champion in 2019 and 2023, and Italy's Gregorio Paltrinieri, the 2022 world champion, were also competing. France's Marc-Antoine Olivier, the 2025 World Cup points leader, was also in contention.

Each World Aquatics member federation could enter up to two athletes in this event.

== Postponement ==
The race was originally scheduled to take place on the morning of 16 July 2025, but water samples taken on 15 July showed that the amount of E. coli bacteria was above acceptable levels, so the race was postponed from 07:30 to 13:00 SGT on 16 July. In the early hours of 16 July, after the test results had shown more improvements and the E. coli amounts were within acceptable levels, World Aquatics confirmed the race would go ahead at the rescheduled time.

== Race ==
The race consisted of six 1.67 km (1.04 mi) laps off the coast of Palawan Beach, Sentosa. It was held at 13:00 SGT, making it the first medal-awarding event of the Championships.

Hungary's Kristóf Rasovszky and Dávid Betlehem led for the first 10 minutes before Germany's Florian Wellbrock took the lead. Rasovszky retook the lead when Wellbrock removed water from his goggles, but Wellbrock overtook Rasovszky at the first turn of the second lap to lead the race. Wellbrock maintained the lead through the third lap. Halfway through lap four, the order from the front was Wellbrock, Neutral Athlete Denis Adeev, Rasovszky, Betlehem, Germany's Oliver Klemet, France's Marc-Antoine Olivier, Italy's Gregorio Paltrinieri, and then Australia's Nicholas Sloman.

During the fifth lap, Klemet moved alongside Wellbrock, while Lee and Paltrinieri joined them to form a leading group of four which broke away from the rest of the field. During the final 400 metres, Wellbrock maintained a lead of a few seconds, Paltrinieri held second, and Lee and Klemet raced for bronze. Wellbrock won with a time of 1:59:55.5, Paltrinieri came second with 1:59:59.2, and Lee finished third with 2:00:10.3, hundredths of a second ahead of Klemet, who finished fourth.

The win gave Wellbrock his seventh world title in open water swimming and his eighth world title overall in swimming. It was also his third time winning this specific event at the World Championships. It was Paltrinieri's 17th World Championships medal, and it was Lee's first individual medal at an international event.

After the race, Wellbrock commented on the final sprint: "It's so dangerous when they're so close, especially Greg—he always has such a great finish. I was really nervous and tried to push all the time." Paltrinieri said, "I tried to catch Flo [Wellbrock], but he was swimming really fast." Lee, surprised at having won a medal, called his performance an "utter shock".

Paltrinieri commented on the water feeling like a "40-degree washing machine", and Wellbrock noted that he felt his high volume of warm water training was the "key" to him winning gold. Marc-Antoine Olivier had to be rescued by a lifeguard in the final kilometre of the race, and several other swimmers retired during the race for medical attention. CNA reported on the hot conditions of the race.

Results
Rank	Swimmer	Nationality	Time
1st place, gold medalist(s)	Florian Wellbrock	Germany	1:59:55.5
2nd place, silver medalist(s)	Gregorio Paltrinieri	Italy	1:59:59.2
3rd place, bronze medalist(s)	Kyle Lee	Australia	2:00:10.3
4	Oliver Klemet	Germany	2:00:10.4
5	Luca Karl	Austria	2:00:30.4
6	Denis Adeev	Neutral Athletes B	2:00:35.8
7	Andrea Filadelli	Italy	2:00:43.7
8	Nicholas Sloman	Australia	2:01:01.9
9	Dávid Betlehem	Hungary	2:01:13.8
10	Christian Schreiber	Switzerland	2:01:39.5
11	Kaito Tsujimori	Japan	2:01:47.9
12	Joey Tepper	United States	2:01:53.8
13	Kristóf Rasovszky	Hungary	2:03:05.5
14	Athanasios Kynigakis	Greece	2:03:05.6
15	Esteban Enderica	Ecuador	2:03:06.1
16	Cho Cheng-chi	Chinese Taipei	2:03:08.9
17	Diogo Cardoso	Portugal	2:03:17.9
18	Martin Straka	Czech Republic	2:03:29.0
19	Paul Niederberger	Switzerland	2:03:29.5
20	Luiz Loureiro	Brazil	2:03:34.2
21	Eric Brown	Canada	2:04:04.6
22	Dylan Gravley	United States	2:04:17.9
23	David Farinango	Ecuador	2:04:18.1
24	Ruan Breytenbach	South Africa	2:05:07.6
25	Hector Pardoe	Great Britain	2:05:38.0
26	Jules Wallart	France	2:05:46.9
27	Piotr Woźniak	Poland	2:07:18.8
28	Matheus Melecchi	Brazil	2:07:28.2
29	Yonatan Ahdut	Israel	2:07:47.3
30	Lev Cherepanov	Kazakhstan	2:07:47.5
31	Logan Vanhuys	Belgium	2:07:52.7
32	Joaquín Moreno	Argentina	2:08:27.5
33	Su Bo-ling	Chinese Taipei	2:08:39.5
34	Riku Takaki	Japan	2:09:18.8
35	Vladislav Utrobin	Neutral Athletes B	2:09:27.7
36	Connor Buck	South Africa	2:09:37.1
37	Lan Tianchen	China	2:10:11.3
38	Zhang Jinhou	China	2:11:06.9
39	Diego Dulieu	Honduras	2:11:07.1
40	Bartosz Kapała	Poland	2:11:32.1
41	Oh Se-beom	South Korea	2:11:33.9
42	Tiago Campos	Portugal	2:11:38.5
43	Artyom Lukasevits	Singapore	2:11:41.4
44	José Barrios	Guatemala	2:11:41.8
45	Ratthawit Thammananthachote	Thailand	2:11:51.8
46	Diego Obele	Mexico	2:11:52.6
47	Nico Esslinger	Namibia	2:11:53.4
48	Keith Sin	Hong Kong	2:12:31.8
49	Jeison Rojas	Costa Rica	2:12:42.9
50	Esteban Faure	Monaco	2:16:05.3
51	Jakub Gabriel	Slovakia	2:17:20.4
52	Alan González	Mexico	2:17:34.0
53	Tomáš Pavelka	Slovakia	2:17:48.7
54	Jamarr Bruno	Puerto Rico	2:19:19.8
55	Aflah Fadlan Prawira	Indonesia	2:19:35.0
56	Anurag Singh	India	2:20:53.1
57	Adrián Ywanaga	Peru	2:21:45.1
58	Juan Núñez	Dominican Republic	2:21:58.4
59	Army Pal	India	2:23:32.9
60	Nithikorn Jeampiriyakul	Thailand	2:26:06.8
61	Chan Tsun Hin	Hong Kong	2:26:43.6
62	Gafar Hassan	Sudan	2:28:03.9
	Joaquín Estigarribia	Paraguay	OTL
	Adam Ahmed	Sudan	OTL
	Santiago Castedo	Bolivia	OTL
	Dilanka Shehan	Sri Lanka	OTL
	Tharusha Perera	Sri Lanka	OTL
	Marc-Antoine Olivier	France	DNF
	Matan Roditi	Israel	DNF
	Park Jae-hun	South Korea	DNF
	Ritchie Oh	Singapore	DNF
	Alejandro Plaza	Bolivia	DNF
	Ronaldo Zambrano	Venezuela	DNF
	Diego Vera	Venezuela	DNF
	Alexander Adrian	Indonesia	DNF
	Théo Druenne	Monaco	DNF
	Samir Bachelani	Kenya	DNF
	Oscar García	Guatemala	DNF
	Rami Rahmouni	Tunisia	DNS
	Juan Morales	Colombia	DNS
	Swaleh Talib	Kenya	DNS

== Further information ==
- World Aquatics Championships: 25 Swimmers Fail to Finish Open Water Race Amid Afternoon Heat (Video). CNA. 16 July 2025 – via YouTube. – Report on the hot conditions of the race, including interviews with various swimmers
- Men's 10 km Open Water Swimming Finish (Video). World Aquatics. 16 July 2025 – via YouTube. – Video of the finish
