= Swimming at the 2025 World Aquatics Championships – Men's 200 metre breaststroke =

Men's 200 metre breaststroke at the 2025 World Aquatics Championships
- Venue: World Aquatics Championships Arena
- Location: Singapore Sports Hub, Kallang, Singapore
- Dates: 31 July (heats and semifinals); 1 August (final)
- Competitors: 39 from 36 nations
- Winning time: 2:07.41

Medalists
gold medal	Qin Haiyang	China
silver medal	Ippei Watanabe	Japan
bronze medal	Caspar Corbeau	Netherlands

The men's 200 metre breaststroke event at the 2025 World Aquatics Championships was held from 31 July to 1 August 2025 at the World Aquatics Championships Arena at the Singapore Sports Hub in Kallang, Singapore.

== Background ==
The event will feature one of the closest fields of the meet, with 15 swimmers seeded under 2:10. China’s Qin Haiyang, the world record holder and 2023 world champion with 2:05.48, is expected to seek redemption after missing the 2024 Olympic final, having already clocked 2:07.44 in 2025. His teammate Dong Zhihao, the 2024 world champion, may also challenge for a medal. Japan’s Ippei Watanabe and Yamato Fukasawa are both entering near 2:07 form, though Watanabe has a history of slower championship swims. Rising Japanese talent Shin Ohashi will not compete despite recently setting a 2:06.91 World Junior Record. Key absences include France’s Léon Marchand, Australia’s Zac Stubblety-Cook, and American Matt Fallon, opening medal opportunities for contenders such as the Netherlands’ Caspar Corbeau and Russia's Kirill Prigoda, who is competing as part of the Neutral Athletes B team.

== Qualification ==
Each National Federation was permitted to enter a maximum of two qualified athletes in each individual event, but they could do so only if both of them had attained the "A" standard qualification time. For this event, the "A" standard qualification time was 2:10.32. Federations could enter one athlete into the event if they met the "B" standard qualification time. For this event, the "B" standard qualification time was 2:14.88. Athletes could also enter the event if they had met an "A" or "B" standard in a different event and their Federation had not entered anyone else. Additional considerations applied to Federations who had few swimmers enter through the standard qualification times. Federations in this category could at least enter two men and two women to the competition, all of whom could enter into up to two events.

Top 10 fastest qualification times
Swimmer	Country	Time	Competition
Léon Marchand	France	2:05.85	2024 Summer Olympics
Matt Fallon	United States	2:06.54	2024 United States Olympic Trials
Zac Stubblety-Cook	Australia	2:06.79	2024 Summer Olympics
Ippei Watanabe	Japan	2:06.94	2024 Japanese Olympic Trials
Yu Hanaguruma	Japan	2:07.06	2024 Japanese Olympic Trials
Yamato Fukasawa	Japan	2:07.47	2025 Japanese Championships
Qin Haiyang	China	2:07.57	2025 Chinese Championships
Caspar Corbeau	Netherlands	2:07.90	2024 Summer Olympics
A J Pouch	United States	2:08.00	2024 United States Olympic Trials
Joshua Yong	Australia	2:08.08	2024 Australian Olympic Trials

== Records ==
Prior to the competition, the existing world and championship records were as follows.

World record	Qin Haiyang (CHN)	2:05.48	Fukuoka, Japan	28 July 2023
Competition record	Qin Haiyang (CHN)	2:05.48	Fukuoka, Japan	28 July 2023

== Heats ==
The heats took place on 31 July 2025 at 11:12.

Rank	Heat	Lane	Swimmer	Nation	Time	Notes
1	3	3	Aleksandr Zhigalov	Neutral Athletes B	2:08.32	Q
2	5	4	Ippei Watanabe	Japan	2:08.41	Q
3	4	5	AJ Pouch	United States	2:08.62	Q
4	3	4	Qin Haiyang	China	2:09.96	Q
5	5	1	Carles Coll	Spain	2:10.30	Q
6	5	5	Caspar Corbeau	Netherlands	2:10.31	Q
7	3	5	Kirill Prigoda	Neutral Athletes B	2:10.46	Q
8	5	7	Gregory Butler	Great Britain	2:10.60	Q
9	4	4	Yamato Fukasawa	Japan	2:10.83	Q
10	3	7	Jan Kałusowski	Poland	2:10.88	Q
11	4	0	Oliver Dawson	Canada	2:11.07	Q
11	5	8	Maksym Ovchinnikov	Ukraine	2:11.07	Q
13	5	6	Christian Mantegazza	Italy	2:11.10	Q
14	5	2	Cho Sung-jae	South Korea	2:11.13	Q
15	5	3	Dong Zhihao	China	2:11.15	Q
16	3	6	Erik Persson	Sweden	2:11.34	Q
17	4	1	Aleksas Savickas	Lithuania	2:11.37	
18	5	0	Filip Mujan	Croatia	2:11.53	
19	4	7	Denis Petrashov	Kyrgyzstan	2:11.68	
20	3	1	Eoin Corby	Ireland	2:11.84	
21	3	2	Luka Mladenovic	Austria	2:12.03	
22	4	6	Lyubomir Epitropov	Bulgaria	2:12.28	
23	3	0	Savvas Thomoglou	Greece	2:12.47	
24	3	8	Miguel de Lara	Mexico	2:14.41	
25	4	8	Adam Mak	Hong Kong	2:14.59	
26	2	4	Mariano Lazzerini	Chile	2:14.61	
27	3	9	Phạm Thanh Bảo	Vietnam	2:15.73	
28	5	9	Wang Hsing-hao	Chinese Taipei	2:15.87	
29	2	2	Amro Al-Wir	Jordan	2:16.09	
30	2	5	Chan Chun Ho	Singapore	2:16.17	
31	4	9	Daniils Bobrovs	Latvia	2:16.22	
32	2	6	Constantin Malachi	Moldova	2:17.69	
33	2	7	Jacob Story	Cook Islands	2:17.91	NR
34	2	0	Richard Nagy	Slovakia	2:20.64	
35	2	1	Saud Ghali	Bahrain	2:24.00	
36	2	8	Jonathan Raharvel	Madagascar	2:25.59	
37	1	4	Lin Myat Thu	Myanmar	2:31.63	
38	1	5	Pedro Pinotes	Angola	2:32.22	
	1	3	Mohammed Al-Otaibi	Saudi Arabia	Disqualified	
	2	3	Jaouad Syoud	Algeria	Did not start	
	4	2	Nicolò Martinenghi	Italy	Did not start	
	4	3	Josh Matheny	United States	Did not start	

== Semifinals ==
The semifinals took place on 31 July at 20:12.

Rank	Heat	Lane	Swimmer	Nation	Time	Notes
1	1	4	Ippei Watanabe	Japan	2:08.01	Q
2	2	5	AJ Pouch	United States	2:08.34	Q
3	1	3	Caspar Corbeau	Netherlands	2:08.44	Q
4	2	2	Yamato Fukasawa	Japan	2:08.45	Q
5	2	3	Carles Coll	Spain	2:08.49	Q, NR
6	2	4	Aleksandr Zhigalov	Neutral Athletes B	2:08.55	Q
7	2	6	Kirill Prigoda	Neutral Athletes B	2:08.91	Q
8	1	5	Qin Haiyang	China	2:09.32	Q
9	1	6	Gregory Butler	Great Britain	2:09.60	
10	1	1	Cho Sung-jae	South Korea	2:10.23	
11	2	7	Oliver Dawson	Canada	2:10.32	
12	2	1	Christian Mantegazza	Italy	2:10.58	
13	1	8	Erik Persson	Sweden	2:10.85	
14	1	7	Maksym Ovchinnikov	Ukraine	2:10.95	
15	2	8	Dong Zhihao	China	2:11.77	
16	1	2	Jan Kałusowski	Poland	2:11.84	

== Final ==
The final took place on 1 August at 19.45.

Rank	Lane	Name	Nationality	Time	Notes
1st place, gold medalist(s)	8	Qin Haiyang	China	2:07.41	
2nd place, silver medalist(s)	4	Ippei Watanabe	Japan	2:07.70	
3rd place, bronze medalist(s)	3	Caspar Corbeau	Netherlands	2:07.73	
4	1	Kirill Prigoda	Neutral Athletes B	2:07.99	
5	5	AJ Pouch	United States	2:09.13	
6	6	Yamato Fukasawa	Japan	2:09.21	
7	2	Carles Coll	Spain	2:09.44	
—	7	Aleksandr Zhigalov	Neutral Athletes B	Disqualified	
