= China at the 2025 World Aquatics Championships =

- Flag of China
- World Aquatics code: CHN
- National federation: Chinese Swimming Association
- Website: swimming.org.cn

in Singapore
- Competitors: 96 in 5 sports
- Medals Ranked 1st: Gold 15 Silver 12 Bronze 10 Total 37

World Aquatics Championships appearances
- 1973; 1975; 1978; 1982; 1986; 1991; 1994; 1998; 2001; 2003; 2005; 2007; 2009; 2011; 2013; 2015; 2017; 2019; 2022; 2023; 2024; 2025

China competed at the 2025 World Aquatics Championships in Singapore from 11 July to 3 August 2025.

== Medalists ==
Medal	Name	Sport	Event	Date
Gold	Xu Huiyan	Artistic swimming	Women's solo technical	19 July
Gold	Chang Hao; Cheng Wentao; Dai Shiyi; Feng Yu; Li Xiuchen; Lin Yanhan; Xiang Binxuan; Xu Huiyan	Artistic swimming	Team free	20 July
Gold	Chang Hao; Cheng Wentao; Dai Shiyi; Feng Yu; Li Xiuchen; Lin Yanjun; Xiang Binxuan; Xu Huiyan	Artistic swimming	Team technical	22 July
Gold	Chang Hao; Cheng Wentao; Feng Yu; Lin Yanhan; Lin Yanjun; Xiang Binxuan; Xu Huiyan; Zhang Yayi	Artistic swimming	Team acrobatic	25 July
Gold	Cao Yuan; Chen Yiwen; Chen Yuxi; Cheng Zilong	Diving	Team	26 July
Gold	Xie Peiling; Zhu Yongxin	Diving	Mixed 10 m synchronized platform	27 July
Gold	Zheng Jiuyuan	Diving	Men's 1 m springboard	27 July
Gold	Wang Zongyuan; Zheng Jiuyuan	Diving	Men's 3 m synchronized springboard	28 July
Gold	Chen Yuxi; Zhang Minjie	Diving	Women's 10 m synchronized platform	28 July
Gold	Qin Haiyang	Swimming	Men's 100 m breaststroke	28 July
Gold	Chen Jia; Chen Yiwen	Diving	Women's 3 m synchronized springboard	29 July
Gold	Cheng Zilong; Zhu Zifeng	Diving	Men's 10 m synchronized platform	29 July
Gold	Chen Yuxi	Diving	Women's 10 m platform	31 July
Gold	Qin Haiyang	Swimming	Men's 200 m breaststroke	1 August
Gold	Chen Yiwen	Diving	Women's 3 m springboard	2 August
Silver	Guo Muye	Artistic swimming	Men's solo free	21 July
Silver	Lin Yanhan; Lin Yanjun	Artistic swimming	Women's duet technical	21 July
Silver	Xu Huiyan	Artistic swimming	Women's solo free	22 July
Silver	Li Yajie	Diving	Women's 1 m springboard	26 July
Silver	Li Bingjie	Swimming	Women's 400 m freestyle	27 July
Silver	Li Bingjie	Swimming	Women's 200 m freestyle	30 July
Silver	Qin Haiyang; Wu Qingfeng; Xu Jiayu; Zhang Yufei; Cheng Yujie^{a} Dong Zhihao^{a} Yu Yiting^{a}	Swimming	Mixed 4 × 100 m medley relay	30 July
Silver	Cao Yuan	Diving	Men's 3 m springboard	1 August
Silver	Ji Xinjie; Pan Zhanle; Wang Shun; Zhang Zhanshuo; Fei Liwei^{a}	Swimming	Men's 4 × 200 m freestyle relay	1 August
Silver	Chen Jia	Diving	Women's 3 m springboard	2 August
Silver	Tang Qianting	Swimming	Women's 50 m breaststroke	3 August
Silver	Wu Qingfeng	Swimming	Women's 50 m freestyle	3 August
Bronze	Yan Siyu	Diving	Men's 1 m springboard	27 July
Bronze	Tang Qianting	Swimming	Women's 100 m breaststroke	29 July
Bronze	Cheng Zilong; Li Yajie	Diving	Mixed 3 m synchronized springboard	30 July
Bronze	Qin Haiyang	Swimming	Men's 50 m breaststroke	30 July
Bronze	Xie Peiling	Diving	Women's 10 m platform	31 July
Bronze	Wan Letian	Swimming	Women's 50 m backstroke	31 July
Bronze	Li Bingjie; Liu Yaxin; Yang Peiqi; Yu Yiting; Wu Qingfeng^{[a]} Yu Zidi^{[a]}	Swimming	Women's 4 × 200 m freestyle relay	31 July
Bronze	Wang Zongyuan	Diving	Men's 3 m springboard	1 August
Bronze	Cheng Yujie	Swimming	Women's 50 m freestyle	3 August
Bronze	Cheng Yujie; Peng Xuwei; Tang Qianting; Zhang Yufei; Wan Letian^{[a]} Wu Qingfeng^{[a]} Yang Chang^{[a]} Yu Yiting^{[a]}	Swimming	Women's 4 × 100 m medley relay	3 August

^{a} Swimmers who participated in the heats only.

Medals by sport
Sport	1st place, gold medalist(s)	2nd place, silver medalist(s)	3rd place, bronze medalist(s)	Total
Artistic swimming	4	3	0	7
Diving	9	3	4	16
Swimming	2	6	6	14
Total	15	12	10	37

== Competitors ==
The following is the list of competitors in the Championships.

Sport	Men	Women	Total
Artistic swimming	1	12	13
Diving	8	6	14
Open water swimming	2	4*	6*
Swimming	16	18*	34*
Water polo	15	15	30
Total	42	55*	96*

- Liu Yaxin competed in both open water swimming and pool swimming.

== Artistic swimming ==
Men

Athlete	Event	Final	
Athlete	Event	Points	Rank
Guo Muye	Solo technical	235.0725	4
Guo Muye	Solo free	220.1926	2nd place, silver medalist(s)

Women

Athlete	Event	Preliminary		Final	
Athlete	Event	Points	Rank	Points	Rank
Xu Huiyan	Solo technical	265.8984	1 Q	272.9917	1st place, gold medalist(s)
Xu Huiyan	Solo free	238.7737	1 Q	241.0025	2nd place, silver medalist(s)
Lin Yanhan; Lin Yanjun	Duet technical	301.0933	2 Q	301.4057	2nd place, silver medalist(s)
Lin Yanhan; Lin Yanjun	Duet free	251.8706	6 Q	274.3090	4

Mixed

Athlete	Event	Preliminary		Final	
Athlete	Event	Points	Rank	Points	Rank
Guo Muye; Guo Sitong	Duet technical	—		216.5234	6
Guo Muye; Liu Jinhan	Duet free	—		256.8216	7
Chang Hao; Cheng Wentao; Feng Yu; Lin Yanhan; Lin Yanjun; Xiang Binxuan; Xu Huiyan; Zhang Yayi	Team acrobatic	225.7993	1 Q	229.0186	1st place, gold medalist(s)
Chang Hao; Cheng Wentao; Dai Shiyi; Feng Yu; Li Xiuchen; Lin Yanjun; Xiang Binxuan; Xu Huiyan	Team technical	306.2460	1 Q	307.8001	1st place, gold medalist(s)
Chang Hao; Cheng Wentao; Dai Shiyi; Feng Yu; Li Xiuchen; Lin Yanhan; Xiang Binxuan; Xu Huiyan	Team free	338.2167	1 Q	348.4779	1st place, gold medalist(s)

== Diving ==
Men

Athlete	Event	Preliminary		Semifinal		Final	
Athlete	Event	Points	Rank	Points	Rank	Points	Rank
Yan Siyu	1 m springboard	372.25	4 Q	—		405.50	3rd place, bronze medalist(s)
Zheng Jiuyuan	1 m springboard	428.00	1 Q	—		443.70	1st place, gold medalist(s)
Cao Yuan	3 m springboard	447.15	3 Q	512.15	2 Q	522.70	2nd place, silver medalist(s)
Wang Zongyuan	3 m springboard	478.60	1 Q	547.30	1 Q	515.55	3rd place, bronze medalist(s)
Zhao Renjie	10 m platform	489.25	1 Q	491.35	2 Q	499.95	5
Zhu Zifeng	10 m platform	461.70	4 Q	502.55	1 Q	506.10	4
Wang Zongyuan; Zheng Jiuyuan	3 m synchronized springboard	445.83	1 Q	—		467.31	1st place, gold medalist(s)
Cheng Zilong; Zhu Zifeng	10 m synchronized platform	423.33	1 Q	—		429.63	1st place, gold medalist(s)

Women

Athlete	Event	Preliminary		Semifinal		Final	
Athlete	Event	Points	Rank	Points	Rank	Points	Rank
Chen Jia	1 m springboard	288.85	2 Q	—		254.80	9
Li Yajie	1 m springboard	283.80	3 Q	—		290.25	2nd place, silver medalist(s)
Chen Jia	3 m springboard	342.95	1 Q	347.40	2 Q	356.40	2nd place, silver medalist(s)
Chen Yiwen	3 m springboard	323.30	2 Q	358.05	1 Q	389.70	1st place, gold medalist(s)
Chen Yuxi	10 m platform	396.50	1 Q	394.65	1 Q	430.50	1st place, gold medalist(s)
Xie Peiling	10 m platform	337.50	2 Q	317.50	4 Q	358.20	3rd place, bronze medalist(s)
Chen Jia; Chen Yiwen	3 m synchronized springboard	310.68	1 Q	—		325.20	1st place, gold medalist(s)
Chen Yuxi; Zhang Minjie	10 m synchronized platform	331.08	1 Q	—		349.26	1st place, gold medalist(s)

Mixed

Athlete	Event	Final	
Athlete	Event	Points	Rank
Cheng Zilong; Li Yajie	3 m synchronized springboard	305.70	3rd place, bronze medalist(s)
Xie Peiling; Zhu Yongxin	10 m synchronized platform	323.04	1st place, gold medalist(s)
Cao Yuan; Chen Yiwen; Chen Yuxi; Cheng Zilong	Team	466.25	1st place, gold medalist(s)

== Open water swimming ==
Men

Athlete	Event	Heat		Semifinal		Final	
Athlete	Event	Time	Rank	Time	Rank	Time	Rank
Lan Tianchen	3 km knockout sprints	17:47.90	18	Did not advance			
Zhang Jinhou	3 km knockout sprints	18:13.80	22	Did not advance			
Lan Tianchen	5 km	—				1:01:01.80	26
Zhang Jinhou	5 km	—				1:00:56.00	24
Lan Tianchen	10 km	—				2:10:11.30	37
Zhang Jinhou	10 km	—				2:11:06.90	38

Women

Athlete	Event	Heat		Semifinal		Final	
Athlete	Event	Time	Rank	Time	Rank	Time	Rank
Cheng Hanyu	3 km knockout sprints	19:14.30	19	Did not advance			
Tian Muran	3 km knockout sprints	18:38.90	11	Did not advance			
Cheng Hanyu	5 km	—				1:06:34.30	32
Tian Muran	5 km	—				1:04:10.90	15
Liu Yaxin	10 km	—				2:17:26.40	22
Wang Kexin	10 km	—				2:20:28.30	28

Mixed

Athlete	Event	Final	
Athlete	Event	Time	Rank
Lan Tianchen; Tian Muran; Wang Kexin; Zhang Jinhou	Team	1:13:33.20	9

== Swimming ==
Men

Athlete	Event	Heat		Semifinal		Final	
Athlete	Event	Time	Rank	Time	Rank	Time	Rank
Pan Zhanle	100 m freestyle	47.86	6 Q	47.81	10	Did not advance	
Wang Haoyu	100 m freestyle	48.83	27	Did not advance			
Pan Zhanle	200 m freestyle	1:47.46	22	Did not advance			
Zhang Zhanshuo	200 m freestyle	1:46.17	9 Q	1:45.84	11	Did not advance	
Fei Liwei	400 m freestyle	3:49.68	25	—		Did not advance	
Zhang Zhanshuo	400 m freestyle	3:45.04	5 Q	—		3:44.82	5
Fei Liwei	800 m freestyle	7:51.01	11	—		Did not advance	
Zhang Zhanshuo	800 m freestyle	7:53.74	15	—		Did not advance	
Fei Liwei	1500 m freestyle	15:05.24	12	—		Did not advance	
Wang Gukailai	50 m backstroke	25.04	24	Did not advance			
Xu Jiayu	50 m backstroke	25.08	26	Did not advance			
Wang Shun	100 m backstroke	54.31	27	Did not advance			
Xu Jiayu	100 m backstroke	53.73	14 Q	53.14	11	Did not advance	
Yu Jingming	200 m backstroke	2:02.29	34	Did not advance			
Qin Haiyang	50 m breaststroke	26.98	11 Q	26.52	1 Q	26.67	3rd place, bronze medalist(s)
Sun Jiajun	50 m breaststroke	27.55	32	Did not advance			
Dong Zhihao	100 m breaststroke	59.46	7 Q	59.43	10	Did not advance	
Qin Haiyang	100 m breaststroke	59.13	5 Q	58.24	1 Q	58.23	1st place, gold medalist(s)
Dong Zhihao	200 m breaststroke	2:11.15	15 Q	2:11.77	15	Did not advance	
Qin Haiyang	200 m breaststroke	2:09.96	4 Q	2:09.32	8 Q	2:07.41	1st place, gold medalist(s)
Lin Yuchen	50 m butterfly	24.19	44	Did not advance			
Chen Juner	100 m butterfly	51.95	25	Did not advance			
Xu Fang	100 m butterfly	51.90	23	Did not advance			
Chen Juner	200 m butterfly	1:54.54	4 Q	1:54.02	3 Q	1:55.25	7
Xu Fang	200 m butterfly	1:56.99	19	Did not advance			
Wang Shun	200 m medley	1:58.43	11 Q	1:57.48	7 Q	1:57.92	7
Wang Shun	400 m medley	DNS		—		Did not advance	
Zhang Zhanshuo	400 m medley	4:15.86	13	—		Did not advance	
Chen Juner; Liu Wudi; Pan Zhanle; Wang Haoyu	4 × 100 m freestyle relay	3:12.26	4 Q	—		3:11.15	5
Ji Xinjie; Pan Zhanle; Wang Shun; Zhang Zhanshuo; Fei Liwei^{a}	4 × 200 m freestyle relay	7:06.15	6 Q	—		7:00.91 AS	2nd place, silver medalist(s)
Pan Zhanle; Qin Haiyang; Wang Shun; Xu Fang	4 × 100 m medley relay	3:32.69	9	—		Did not advance	

Women

Athlete	Event	Heat		Semifinal		Final	
Athlete	Event	Time	Rank	Time	Rank	Time	Rank
Cheng Yujie	50 m freestyle	24.47	5 Q	24.36	5	24.28	3rd place, bronze medalist(s)
Wu Qingfeng	50 m freestyle	24.53	6 Q	24.36	5 Q	24.26	2nd place, silver medalist(s)
Cheng Yujie	100 m freestyle	53.90	8 Q	53.34	5 Q	53.34	7
Wu Qingfeng	100 m freestyle	54.15	14 Q	54.32	15	Did not advance	
Li Bingjie	200 m freestyle	1:57.57	11 Q	1:55.98	7 Q	1:54.52	2nd place, silver medalist(s)
Liu Yaxin	200 m freestyle	1:57.33	6 Q	1:56.37	9	Did not advance	
Li Bingjie	400 m freestyle	4:03.11	3 Q	—		3:58.21 AS	2nd place, silver medalist(s)
Yang Peiqi	400 m freestyle	4:03.36	5 Q	—		4:06.47	7
Li Bingjie	800 m freestyle	8:23.23	7 Q	—		8:15.59	5
Yang Peiqi	800 m freestyle	8:27.89	9	—		Did not advance	
Li Bingjie	1500 m freestyle	16:02.31	5 Q	—		15:49.54	4
Yang Peiqi	1500 m freestyle	16:08.19	8 Q	—		16:04.93	8
Lu Xingchen	50 m backstroke	28.10	19	Did not advance			
Wan Letian	50 m backstroke	27.59	3 Q	27.44	4 Q	27.30	3rd place, bronze medalist(s)
Peng Xuwei	100 m backstroke	59.34	4 Q	59.19	6 Q	59.10	5
Wan Letian	100 m backstroke	59.35	5 Q	59.56	9	Did not advance	
Liu Yaxin	200 m backstroke	2:09.67	8 Q	2:09.04	7 Q	2:09.71	6
Peng Xuwei	200 m backstroke	2:08.59	4 Q	2:07.76	1 Q	2:07.22	4
Tang Qianting	50 m breaststroke	30.15	3 Q	30.04	2 Q	30.03	2nd place, silver medalist(s)
Yang Chang	50 m breaststroke	30.54	9 Q	30.91	16	Did not advance	
Tang Qianting	100 m breaststroke	1:06.45	7 Q	1:05.87	3 Q	1:05.64	3rd place, bronze medalist(s)
Yang Chang	100 m breaststroke	1:06.83	10 Q	1:06.84	14	Did not advance	
Lyu Qinyao	200 m breaststroke	2:24.93	5 Q	2:24.33	10	Did not advance	
Wang Yichun	50 m butterfly	25.97	16 Q	25.68	12	Did not advance	
Wu Qingfeng	50 m butterfly	26.18	20	Did not advance			
Yu Yiting	100 m butterfly	56.83	5 Q	57.11	8 Q	57.36	8
Zhang Yufei	100 m butterfly	57.11	7 Q	56.84	6 Q	56.47	4
Ma Yonghui	200 m butterfly	2:08.96	6 Q	2:08.59	11	Did not advance	
Yu Zidi	200 m butterfly	2:08.95	5 Q	2:07.95	8 Q	2:06.43	4
Yu Yiting	200 m medley	2:10.33	5 Q	2:10.63	9	Did not advance	
Yu Zidi	200 m medley	2:11.90	15 Q	2:10.22	7 Q	2:09.21	4
Chang Mohan	400 m medley	4:43.12	12	—		Did not advance	
Yu Zidi	400 m medley	4:36.49	3 Q	—		4:33.76	4
Cheng Yujie; Liu Yaxin; Wu Qingfeng; Yu Yiting; Yang Wenwen^{[a]}	4 × 100 m freestyle relay	3:35.63	4 Q	—		3:34.17	4
Li Bingjie; Liu Yaxin; Yang Peiqi; Yu Yiting; Wu Qingfeng^{[a]} Yu Zidi^{[a]}	4 × 200 m freestyle relay	7:54.06	3 Q	—		7:42.99	3rd place, bronze medalist(s)
Cheng Yujie; Peng Xuwei; Tang Qianting; Zhang Yufei; Wan Letian^{[a]} Wu Qingfeng^{[a]} Yang Chang^{[a]} Yu Yiting^{[a]}	4 × 100 m medley relay	3:56.70	4 Q	—		3:54.77	3rd place, bronze medalist(s)

Mixed

Athlete	Event	Heat		Final	
Athlete	Event	Time	Rank	Time	Rank
Chen Juner; Wang Haoyu; Yang Wenwen; Yu Yiting	4 × 100 m freestyle relay	3:25.12	10	Did not advance	
Qin Haiyang; Wu Qingfeng; Xu Jiayu; Zhang Yufei; Cheng Yujie^{a} Dong Zhihao^{a} Yu Yiting^{a}	4 × 100 m medley relay	3:42.81	3 Q	3:39.99	2nd place, silver medalist(s)

^{a} Swimmers who participated in the heats only.

== Water polo ==
Summary

Team	Event	Group stage				Playoff	Quarterfinal	Semifinal / Cl	Final / BM / Pl	
Team	Event	Opposition Score	Opposition Score	Opposition Score	Rank	Opposition Score	Opposition Score	Opposition Score	Opposition Score	Rank
China	Men's tournament	Croatia; L 6–25	Greece; L 5–26	Montenegro; L 8–13	4	Did not advance		Classification 13–16; Singapore; W 21–8	Classification 13–14; Australia; L 9–16	14
China	Women's tournament	United States; L 7–15	Argentina; W 29–9	Netherlands; L 7–13	3 QP	Italy; L 11–13	Did not advance	Classification 9–12; France; W 18–6	Classification 9–10; New Zealand; W 10–6	9

=== Men's tournament ===
Team roster

The following is the Chinese roster.

Head coach: Ivan Asič/Chen Weihan

- 1 Wu Honghui GK
- 2 Liu Yu FP
- 3 Li Deming FP
- 4 Peng Jiahao FP
- 5 Cai Yuhao FP
- 6 Xie Zekai FP
- 7 Chen Zhongxian FP
- 8 Chen Rui FP
- 9 Chen Yimin FP
- 10 Zhu Jiashao FP
- 11 Wen Zijun FP
- 12 Shen Dingsong FP
- 13 Wu Yongxiang GK
- 14 Wang Beiyi FP
- 15 Liu Zhilong FP

Group play

Pos	Team	Pld	W	PSW	PSL	L	GF	GA	GD	Pts	Qualification
1	Croatia	3	3	0	0	0	48	26	+22	9	Quarterfinals
2	Montenegro	3	2	0	0	1	34	30	+4	6	Playoffs
3	Greece	3	1	0	0	2	44	25	+19	3	Playoffs
4	China	3	0	0	0	3	19	64	−45	0	13–16th place semifinals

Source: Omegatiming
Rules for classification: 1) points; 2) head-to-head points; 3) head-to-head goal difference; 4) head-to-head number of goals scored; 5) Goal difference.

12 July 2025; 12:10	Report	China	6–25	Croatia	OCBC Aquatic Centre, Singapore; Referees: Mihai Balanescu (ROU), Nicholas Hodgers (AUS)
12 July 2025; 12:10	Report	Score by quarters: 1–7, 0–5, 4–7, 1–6			OCBC Aquatic Centre, Singapore; Referees: Mihai Balanescu (ROU), Nicholas Hodgers (AUS)
12 July 2025; 12:10	Report	Xie 2	Goals	Bukić 6	OCBC Aquatic Centre, Singapore; Referees: Mihai Balanescu (ROU), Nicholas Hodgers (AUS)

14 July 2025; 12:10	Report	Greece	26–5	China	OCBC Aquatic Centre, Singapore; Referees: Marta Cabanas (ESP), Chisato Kurosaki (JPN)
14 July 2025; 12:10	Report	Score by quarters: 2–0, 10–0, 6–3, 8–2			OCBC Aquatic Centre, Singapore; Referees: Marta Cabanas (ESP), Chisato Kurosaki (JPN)
14 July 2025; 12:10	Report	Nikolaidis 5	Goals	five players 1	OCBC Aquatic Centre, Singapore; Referees: Marta Cabanas (ESP), Chisato Kurosaki (JPN)

16 July 2025; 12:10	Report	China	8–13	Montenegro	OCBC Aquatic Centre, Singapore; Referees: Dasch Barber (RSA), Tamás Kovács-Csatlós (HUN)
16 July 2025; 12:10	Report	Score by quarters: 0–3, 2–2, 3–3, 3–5			OCBC Aquatic Centre, Singapore; Referees: Dasch Barber (RSA), Tamás Kovács-Csatlós (HUN)
16 July 2025; 12:10	Report	Chen Z. 3	Goals	four players 2	OCBC Aquatic Centre, Singapore; Referees: Dasch Barber (RSA), Tamás Kovács-Csatlós (HUN)

13–16th place semifinals

18 July 2025; 10:35	Report	Singapore	8–21	China	OCBC Aquatic Centre, Singapore; Referees: Mihai Balanescu (ROU), Evan Andrews (CAN)
18 July 2025; 10:35	Report	Score by quarters: 1–6, 3–6, 1–5, 3–4			OCBC Aquatic Centre, Singapore; Referees: Mihai Balanescu (ROU), Evan Andrews (CAN)
18 July 2025; 10:35	Report	Lok 2	Goals	Chen Z. 6	OCBC Aquatic Centre, Singapore; Referees: Mihai Balanescu (ROU), Evan Andrews (CAN)

Thirteenth place game

20 July 2025; 10:35	Report	Australia	16–9	China	OCBC Aquatic Centre, Singapore; Referees: Dasch Barber (RSA), Alessia Ferrari (ITA)
20 July 2025; 10:35	Report	Score by quarters: 5–2, 3–1, 5–3, 3–3			OCBC Aquatic Centre, Singapore; Referees: Dasch Barber (RSA), Alessia Ferrari (ITA)
20 July 2025; 10:35	Report	Power 5	Goals	Chen Z. 3	OCBC Aquatic Centre, Singapore; Referees: Dasch Barber (RSA), Alessia Ferrari (ITA)

=== Women's tournament ===
Team roster

The following is the Chinese roster.

Head coach: Miki Oca

- 1 Du Xinyue GK
- 2 Zhang Yumian FP
- 3 Yan Jing FP
- 4 Zhou Shang FP
- 5 Zou Yuhe FP
- 6 Wang Shiyun FP
- 7 Shao Yixin FP
- 8 Wang Huan FP
- 9 Yan Siya FP
- 10 Nong Sanfeng FP
- 11 Zhang Qishuo FP
- 12 Wang Xuan FP
- 13 Shen Yineng GK
- 14 Ma Li FP
- 15 Zhang Jingwen FP

Group play

Pos	Team	Pld	W	PSW	PSL	L	GF	GA	GD	Pts	Qualification
1	United States	3	3	0	0	0	52	19	+33	9	Quarterfinals
2	Netherlands	3	2	0	0	1	47	24	+23	6	Playoffs
3	China	3	1	0	0	2	43	37	+6	3	Playoffs
4	Argentina	3	0	0	0	3	18	80	−62	0	13–16th place semifinals

Source: Omegatiming
Rules for classification: 1) points; 2) head-to-head points; 3) head-to-head goal difference; 4) head-to-head number of goals scored; 5) Goal difference.

11 July 2025; 12:10	Report	United States	15–7	China	OCBC Aquatic Centre, Singapore; Referees: Marta Cabanas (ESP), Chisato Kurosaki (JPN)
11 July 2025; 12:10	Report	Score by quarters: 3–1, 4–3, 6–1, 2–2			OCBC Aquatic Centre, Singapore; Referees: Marta Cabanas (ESP), Chisato Kurosaki (JPN)
11 July 2025; 12:10	Report	Ausmus, Lineback 3	Goals	Wang H. 2	OCBC Aquatic Centre, Singapore; Referees: Marta Cabanas (ESP), Chisato Kurosaki (JPN)

13 July 2025; 09:00	Report	China	29–9	Argentina	OCBC Aquatic Centre, Singapore; Referees: Marcella Braga (BRA), Andrej Franulović (CRO)
13 July 2025; 09:00	Report	Score by quarters: 9–4, 6–1, 6–1, 8–3			OCBC Aquatic Centre, Singapore; Referees: Marcella Braga (BRA), Andrej Franulović (CRO)
13 July 2025; 09:00	Report	three players 4	Goals	three players 2	OCBC Aquatic Centre, Singapore; Referees: Marcella Braga (BRA), Andrej Franulović (CRO)

15 July 2025; 16:00	Report	China	7–13	Netherlands	OCBC Aquatic Centre, Singapore; Referees: Andrej Franulović (CRO), Yasser Mehalhel (EGY)
15 July 2025; 16:00	Report	Score by quarters: 2–3, 1–2, 2–4, 2–4			OCBC Aquatic Centre, Singapore; Referees: Andrej Franulović (CRO), Yasser Mehalhel (EGY)
15 July 2025; 16:00	Report	Yan S. 3	Goals	Van der Sloot 4	OCBC Aquatic Centre, Singapore; Referees: Andrej Franulović (CRO), Yasser Mehalhel (EGY)

Playoffs

17 July 2025; 16:00	Report	Italy	13–11	China	OCBC Aquatic Centre, Singapore; Referees: Jennifer McCall (USA), Marta Cabanas (ESP)
17 July 2025; 16:00	Report	Score by quarters: 2–0, 4–5, 5–4, 2–2			OCBC Aquatic Centre, Singapore; Referees: Jennifer McCall (USA), Marta Cabanas (ESP)
17 July 2025; 16:00	Report	Bettini, Bianconi 3	Goals	Wang S., Yan S. 2	OCBC Aquatic Centre, Singapore; Referees: Jennifer McCall (USA), Marta Cabanas (ESP)

9–12th place semifinals

19 July 2025; 12:10	Report	China	18–6	France	OCBC Aquatic Centre, Singapore; Referees: Fiona Haigh (AUS), Germán Moller (ARG)
19 July 2025; 12:10	Report	Score by quarters: 2–2, 4–0, 7–2, 5–2			OCBC Aquatic Centre, Singapore; Referees: Fiona Haigh (AUS), Germán Moller (ARG)
19 July 2025; 12:10	Report	Yan S. 4	Goals	Vernoux 3	OCBC Aquatic Centre, Singapore; Referees: Fiona Haigh (AUS), Germán Moller (ARG)

Ninth place game

21 July 2025; 10:35	Report	China	10–6	New Zealand	OCBC Aquatic Centre, Singapore; Referees: Aurély Blanchard (FRA), Maxim Gerasimov (GBR)
21 July 2025; 10:35	Report	Score by quarters: 4–2, 2–1, 0–1, 4–2			OCBC Aquatic Centre, Singapore; Referees: Aurély Blanchard (FRA), Maxim Gerasimov (GBR)
21 July 2025; 10:35	Report	four players 2	Goals	McDowall 5	OCBC Aquatic Centre, Singapore; Referees: Aurély Blanchard (FRA), Maxim Gerasimov (GBR)
