= Brazil at the 2025 World Aquatics Championships =

- Flag of Brazil
- World Aquatics code: BRA
- National federation: Brazilian Confederation of Aquatic Sports
- Website: cbda.org.br (in Portuguese)

in Singapore
- Competitors: 50 in 6 sports
- Medals: Gold 0 Silver 0 Bronze 0 Total 0

World Aquatics Championships appearances (overview)
- 1973; 1975; 1978; 1982; 1986; 1991; 1994; 1998; 2001; 2003; 2005; 2007; 2009; 2011; 2013; 2015; 2017; 2019; 2022; 2023; 2024; 2025

Brazil will compete at the 2025 World Aquatics Championships in Singapore from July 11 to August 3, 2025.

== Athletes by discipline ==
The following is the number of competitors who participated at the Championships per discipline.

Sport	Men	Women	Total
Artistic swimming	2	8	10
Diving	6*	4	10*
High diving	2*	0	2*
Open water swimming	2	2	4
Swimming	5	6	11
Water polo	15	0	15
Total	31	20	51

- Miguel Cardoso competed in both diving and high diving.

== Artistic swimming ==
Brazil entered 10 artistic swimmers.

Men

Athlete	Event	Preliminaries		Final	
Athlete	Event	Points	Rank	Points	Rank
Bernardo Barreto	Solo technical routine	—		186.4083	13
Bernardo Santos	Solo free routine	—		152.8275	12

Women

Athlete	Event	Preliminaries		Final	
Athlete	Event	Points	Rank	Points	Rank
Gabriela Regly; Anna Giulia Veloso	Duet technical routine	235.3092	24	Did not advance	
Gabriela Regly; Anna Giulia Veloso	Duet free routine	201.1367	21	Did not advance	

Mixed

Athlete	Event	Preliminaries		Final	
Athlete	Event	Points	Rank	Points	Rank
Bernardo Santos; Gabriela Regly	Duet technical routine	—		182.1041	11
Bernardo Barreto; Vitória Casale; Sara Marinho; Ana Beatriz Nunes; Celina Rangel; Gabriela Regly; Bernardo Santos; Anna Giulia Veloso	Team acrobatic routine	170.5412	16	Did not advance	
Vitória Casale; Sara Marinho; Ana Beatriz Nunes; Marina Postal; Celina Rangel; Gabriela Regly; Hannah Sukman; Anna Giulia Veloso	Team technical routine	219.6482	20	Did not advance	
Vitória Casale; Sara Marinho; Ana Beatriz Nunes; Marina Postal; Celina Rangel; Gabriela Regly; Hannah Sukman; Anna Giulia Veloso	Team free routine	249.6293	10 Q	238.3475	12

== Diving ==
Brazil entered 10 divers.

Men

Athlete	Event	Preliminaries		Semi-finals		Final	
Athlete	Event	Points	Rank	Points	Rank	Points	Rank
Rafael Max	1 m springboard	269.40	46	—		Did not advance	
Luís Felipe Moura	1 m springboard	294.90	36	—		Did not advance	
Rafael Max	3 m springboard	323.05	47	Did not advance			
Luís Felipe Moura	3 m springboard	299.65	55	Did not advance			
Rafael Borges; Luís Felipe Moura	3 m synchronized springboard	318.18	20	—		Did not advance	
Miguel Cardoso	10 m platform	289.20	43	Did not advance			
Jackson Rondinelli	10 m platform	294.20	42	Did not advance			
Miguel Cardoso; Caio Dalmaso	10 m synchronized platform	320.58	15	—		Did not advance	

Women

Athlete	Event	Preliminaries		Semi-finals		Final	
Athlete	Event	Points	Rank	Points	Rank	Points	Rank
Luana Lira	1 m springboard	199.15	38	—		Did not advance	
Anna Lúcia dos Santos	1 m springboard	237.20	14	—		Did not advance	
Luana Lira	3 m springboard	252.30	26	Did not advance			
Anna Lúcia dos Santos	3 m springboard	198.40	43	Did not advance			
Luana Lira; Anna Lúcia dos Santos	3 m synchronized springboard	246.60	9	—		Did not advance	
Giovanna Pedroso	10 m platform	222.30	31	Did not advance			
Ingrid Oliveira; Giovanna Pedroso	10 m synchronized platform	249.84	13	—		Did not advance	

Mixed

Athlete	Event	Final	
Athlete	Event	Points	Rank
Miguel Cardoso; Anna Lúcia dos Santos	3 m synchronized springboard	242.40	10
Luís Felipe Moura; Jackson Rondinelli; Luana Lira; Giovanna Pedroso	Team	342.60	12

== High diving ==
Brazil entered 2 high divers.

Men

Athlete	Event	Preliminaries		Final	
Athlete	Event	Points	Rank	Points	Rank
Miguel Cardoso	Men's high diving	145.10	23	Did not advance	
Jucelino Lima	Men's high diving	172.20	22	Did not advance	

== Open water swimming ==
Brazil entered 4 open water swimmers.

Men

Athlete	Event	Heat		Semi-final		Final	
Athlete	Event	Time	Rank	Time	Rank	Time	Rank
Luiz Loureiro	Men's 3 km knockout sprints	17:13.00	15	Did not advance			
Matheus Melecchi	Men's 3 km knockout sprints	17:10.70	13	Did not advance			
Luiz Loureiro	Men's 5 km	—				Did not start	
Matheus Melecchi	Men's 5 km	—				58:04.60	12
Luiz Loureiro	Men's 10 km	—				2:03:34.20	20
Matheus Melecchi	Men's 10 km	—				2:07:28.20	28

Women

Athlete	Event	Heat		Semi-final		Final	
Athlete	Event	Time	Rank	Time	Rank	Time	Rank
Ana Marcela Cunha	Women's 3 km knockout sprints	18:14.50	7 Q	12:18.50	15	Did not advance	
Viviane Jungblut	Women's 3 km knockout sprints	18:14.70	8	12:16.30	12	Did not advance	
Ana Marcela Cunha	Women's 5 km	—				1:03:10.20	8
Viviane Jungblut	Women's 5 km	—				1:04:56.70	21
Ana Marcela Cunha	Women's 10 km	—				2:09:21.90	6
Viviane Jungblut	Women's 10 km	—				2:14:17.40	17

Mixed

Athlete	Event	Time	Rank
Ana Marcela Cunha; Viviane Jungblut; Luiz Loureiro; Matheus Melecchi	Team relay	1:10:27.20	7

== Swimming ==
Brazil entered 12 swimmers.

Men

Athlete	Event	Heat		Semifinal		Final	
Athlete	Event	Time	Rank	Time	Rank	Time	Rank
Victor Alcará	50 m freestyle	22.37	37	Did not advance			
Guilherme Caribé	50 m freestyle	21.67	7 Q	21.78	10	Did not advance	
Guilherme Caribé	100 m freestyle	48.27	15 Q	47.64	8 Q	47.35	4
Guilherme Costa	200 m freestyle	1:48.06	29	Did not advance			
Guilherme Costa	400 m freestyle	3:48.94	22	—		Did not advance	
Stephan Steverink	400 m freestyle	3:47.93	18	—		Did not advance	
Guilherme Costa	800 m freestyle	7:58.84	18	—		Did not advance	
Guilherme Basseto	50 m backstroke	24.97	20	Did not advance			
Guilherme Basseto	100 m backstroke	54.68	32	Did not advance			
Guilherme Caribé	50 m butterfly	23.21	=12 Q	22.91	=7 Q	22.92	8
Stephan Steverink	400 m medley	4:20.71	22	—		Did not advance	

Women

Athlete	Event	Heat		Semifinal		Final	
Athlete	Event	Time	Rank	Time	Rank	Time	Rank
Lorrane Ferreira	50 m freestyle	25.02	21	Did not advance			
Stephanie Balduccini	100 m freestyle	54.57	23	Did not advance			
Stephanie Balduccini	200 m freestyle	1:58.28	16 Q	1:57.87	13	Did not advance	
Maria Fernanda Costa	200 m freestyle	1:57.94	14 Q	1:58.43	14	Did not advance	
Maria Fernanda Costa	400 m freestyle	4:07.32	9	—		Did not advance	
Gabrielle Roncatto	400 m freestyle	4:10.37	16	—		Did not advance	
Gabrielle Roncatto	800 m freestyle	8:48.32	22	—		Did not advance	
Letícia Romão	1500 m freestyle	16:37.65	20	—		Did not advance	
Gabrielle Roncatto	1500 m freestyle	16:31.26	18	—		Did not advance	
Beatriz Bezerra	50 m butterfly	26.56	28	Did not advance			
Stephanie Balduccini	100 m butterfly	59.72	28	Did not advance			

== Water polo ==
Summary

Team	Event	Group stage				Playoff	Quarterfinal	Semi-final	Final / BM	
Team	Event	Opposition Score	Opposition Score	Opposition Score	Rank	Opposition Score	Opposition Score	Opposition Score	Opposition Score	Rank
Brazil	Men's tournament	Singapore; W 19–8	United States; L 7–16	Canada; W 19–18	2 Q	Greece; L 5–17	—	9th–11th place semifinal Japan; L 11–22	11th place match Canada; L 11–16	12

=== Men's tournament ===
Brazil's men's water polo team qualified by finishing second at the 2024 Pan American Water Polo Championship in Ibagué, Colombia.

Team roster

The following is Brazilian roster.

Head coach: Thiago Nascimento

- 1 João Gabriel Silveira GK
- 2 Logan Cabral FP
- 3 Gabriel da Silva FP
- 4 Gustavo Coutinho FP
- 5 André Luiz Freitas FP
- 6 Marcos Paulo Pedroso FP
- 7 Lucas Farias FP
- 8 Pedro Real FP
- 9 Paulo Ricardo Oliveira FP
- 10 Lucas Andrade FP
- 11 Gustavo Guimarães FP
- 12 Luis Ricardo Silva FP
- 13 João Pedro Fernandes GK
- 14 Joao Pedro Leme FP
- 15 Lucas Wulfhorst FP

Group play

Pos	Team	Pld	W	PSW	PSL	L	GF	GA	GD	Pts	Qualification
1	United States	3	3	0	0	0	60	22	+38	9	Quarterfinals
2	Brazil	3	1	1	0	1	37	35	+2	5	Playoffs
3	Canada	3	1	0	1	1	42	39	+3	4	Playoffs
4	Singapore (H)	3	0	0	0	3	24	67	−43	0	13–16th place semifinals

Source: Omegatiming
Rules for classification: 1) points; 2) head-to-head points; 3) head-to-head goal difference; 4) head-to-head number of goals scored; 5) Goal difference.
(H) Host

12 July 2025; 13:45	Report	Brazil	19–8	Singapore	OCBC Aquatic Centre, Singapore; Referees: Alessia Ferrari (ITA), Chisato Kurosaki (JPN)
12 July 2025; 13:45	Report	Score by quarters: 4–0, 5–1, 6–3, 4–4			OCBC Aquatic Centre, Singapore; Referees: Alessia Ferrari (ITA), Chisato Kurosaki (JPN)
12 July 2025; 13:45	Report	three players 3	Goals	Rajandra 3	OCBC Aquatic Centre, Singapore; Referees: Alessia Ferrari (ITA), Chisato Kurosaki (JPN)

14 July 2025; 09:00	Report	United States	16–7	Brazil	OCBC Aquatic Centre, Singapore; Referees: Nicholas Hodgers (AUS), Maxim Gerasimov (GBR)
14 July 2025; 09:00	Report	Score by quarters: 6–1, 2–0, 4–3, 4–3			OCBC Aquatic Centre, Singapore; Referees: Nicholas Hodgers (AUS), Maxim Gerasimov (GBR)
14 July 2025; 09:00	Report	R. Dodd, Irving 4	Goals	Farias 3	OCBC Aquatic Centre, Singapore; Referees: Nicholas Hodgers (AUS), Maxim Gerasimov (GBR)

16 July 2025; 09:00	Report	Canada	18–19 (PSO)	Brazil	OCBC Aquatic Centre, Singapore; Referees: Mihai Balanescu (ROU), Chisato Kurosaki (JPN)
16 July 2025; 09:00	Report	Score by quarters: 6–2, 1–3, 3–4, 1–2 PSO: 7–8			OCBC Aquatic Centre, Singapore; Referees: Mihai Balanescu (ROU), Chisato Kurosaki (JPN)
16 July 2025; 09:00	Report	Côté, D'Souza 3	Goals	Andrade 8	OCBC Aquatic Centre, Singapore; Referees: Mihai Balanescu (ROU), Chisato Kurosaki (JPN)

Playoffs

18 July 2025; 19:10	Report	Brazil	5–17	Greece	OCBC Aquatic Centre, Singapore; Referees: Boris Margeta (SLO), Dasch Barber (RSA)
18 July 2025; 19:10	Report	Score by quarters: 0–2, 0–5, 2–5, 3–5			OCBC Aquatic Centre, Singapore; Referees: Boris Margeta (SLO), Dasch Barber (RSA)
18 July 2025; 19:10	Report	Real 2	Goals	Chalyvopoulos, Genidounias 3	OCBC Aquatic Centre, Singapore; Referees: Boris Margeta (SLO), Dasch Barber (RSA)

9th–12th place semifinals

20 July 2025; 12:10	Report	Japan	22–11	Brazil	OCBC Aquatic Centre, Singapore; Referees: Germán Moller (ARG), Scott Voltz (USA)
20 July 2025; 12:10	Report	Score by quarters: 7–1, 7–4, 4–3, 4–3			OCBC Aquatic Centre, Singapore; Referees: Germán Moller (ARG), Scott Voltz (USA)
20 July 2025; 12:10	Report	Inaba 5	Goals	Real 3	OCBC Aquatic Centre, Singapore; Referees: Germán Moller (ARG), Scott Voltz (USA)

11th place game

22 July 2025; 09:00	Report	Brazil	11–16	Canada	OCBC Aquatic Centre, Singapore; Referees: David Gómez (ESP), Nicholas Hodgers (AUS)
22 July 2025; 09:00	Report	Score by quarters: 3–1, 2–4, 1–5, 5–6			OCBC Aquatic Centre, Singapore; Referees: David Gómez (ESP), Nicholas Hodgers (AUS)
22 July 2025; 09:00	Report	Guimarães 5	Goals	D'Souza 7	OCBC Aquatic Centre, Singapore; Referees: David Gómez (ESP), Nicholas Hodgers (AUS)
