= Diving at the 2025 World Aquatics Championships – Team event =

Team event at the Diving at the 2025 World Aquatics Championships
- Venue: OCBC Aquatic Centre
- Location: Singapore
- Dates: 26 July
- Competitors: 79 from 21 nations
- Teams: 21
- Winning points: 466.25

Medalists
gold medal	Cheng Zilong; Chen Yiwen; Cao Yuan; Chen Yuxi	China
silver medal	Osmar Olvera; Randal Willars; Alejandra Estudillo; Zyanya Parra	Mexico
bronze medal	Reo Nishida; Sho Sakai; Rin Kaneto; Sayaka Mikami	Japan

The Team event competition at the 2025 World Aquatics Championships was held on 26 July 2025.

== Results ==
The final was held at 15:32.

Rank	Nation	Points
1st place, gold medalist(s)	China; Cheng Zilong; Chen Yiwen; Cao Yuan; Chen Yuxi	466.25
2nd place, silver medalist(s)	Mexico; Osmar Olvera; Randal Willars; Alejandra Estudillo; Zyanya Parra	426.30
3rd place, bronze medalist(s)	Japan; Reo Nishida; Sho Sakai; Rin Kaneto; Sayaka Mikami	409.65
4	United States; Jack Ryan; Carson Tyler; Sophie Verzyl; Daryn Wright	404.90
5	Neutral Athlete B Ilia Molchanov; Elizaveta Kuzina; Ruslan Ternovoi; Yulia Timoshinina	400.35
6	Italy; Riccardo Giovannini; Matteo Santoro; Sarah Jodoin Di Maria; Chiara Pellacani	386.85
7	Ukraine; Kirill Boliukh; Oleksiy Sereda; Kseniya Baylo; Sofiya Lyskun	361.45
8	Germany; Ole Rösler; Moritz Wesemann; Pauline Pfeif; Jette Müller	360.85
9	Spain; Juan Cortés; Jorge Rodríguez; Valeria Antolino; Ana Carvajal	358.75
10	Canada; Carson Paul; Katelyn Fung; Amélie-Laura Jasmin; Matt Cullen	349.20
11	Cuba; Bernardo Arias; Carlos Ramos; Frank Rosales; Anisley García	343.85
12	Brazil; Luís Felipe Moura; Jackson Rondinelli; Luana Lira; Giovanna Pedroso	342.60
13	North Korea; Ko Che-won; Jo Jin-mi; Kim Mi-hwa; Choe Wi-hyon	340.85
14	Australia; Cassiel Rousseau; Ellie Cole; Alysha Koloi	328.70
15	South Korea; Kang Min-hyuk; Lee Ye-joo; Moon Na-yun; Yi Jae-gyeong	323.00
16	Malaysia; Elvis Priestly Anak Clement; Enrique Harold; Lee Yiat Qing; Pandelela Rinong	322.55
17	Indonesia; Andriyan; Muhamad Yudha Prastiyo; Gladies Lariesa Garina	273.30
18	New Zealand; Nathan Brown; Frazer Tavener; Maggie Squire	266.25
19	Armenia; Vartan Bayanduryan; Aleksandra Bibikina; Alisa Zakaryan	244.25
20	Singapore; Max Lee; Avvir Tham; Ainslee Kwang; Ashlee Tan	242.20
21	Macau; He Heung Wing; Wong Cho Yi; Zhao Hang U	196.65
