= Diving at the 2025 World Aquatics Championships – Women's 1 metre springboard =

Women's 1 metre springboard at the Diving at the 2025 World Aquatics Championships
- Venue: OCBC Aquatic Centre
- Location: Singapore
- Dates: 26 July (preliminaries and final)
- Competitors: 52 from 32 nations
- Winning points: 308.00

Medalists
gold medal	Maddison Keeney	Australia
silver medal	Li Yajie	China
bronze medal	Chiara Pellacani	Italy

The Women's 1 metre springboard competition at the 2025 World Aquatics Championships was held on 26 July 2025.

== Results ==
The preliminary round was started at 10:02. The final was held at 19:02.

Green denotes finalists

Rank	Diver	Nationality	Preliminary		Final	
Rank	Diver	Nationality	Points	Rank	Points	Rank
1st place, gold medalist(s)	Maddison Keeney	Australia	301.75	1	308.00	1
2nd place, silver medalist(s)	Li Yajie	China	283.80	3	290.25	2
3rd place, bronze medalist(s)	Chiara Pellacani	Italy	251.10	8	270.80	3
4	Hailey Hernandez	United States	245.45	9	270.45	4
5	Michelle Heimberg	Switzerland	261.85	4	265.65	5
6	Kristina Ilinykh	Neutral Athlete B	244.70	10	261.85	6
7	Mía Cueva	Mexico	242.40	11	260.05	7
8	Yasmin Harper	Great Britain	258.35	5	258.45	8
9	Chen Jia	China	288.85	2	254.80	9
10	Aleksandra Bibikina	Armenia	242.15	12	251.45	10
11	Elna Widerström	Sweden	253.40	6	234.60	11
12	Naïs Gillet	France	251.45	7	233.10	12
13	Lena Hentschel	Germany	238.65	13	Did not advance	
14	Anna Lúcia dos Santos	Brazil	237.20	14	Did not advance	
15	María García	Mexico	237.10	15	Did not advance	
16	Georgia Sheehan	Australia	236.90	16	Did not advance	
17	Margo Erlam	Canada	234.65	17	Did not advance	
18	Maha Amer	Egypt	230.50	18	Did not advance	
19	Kim Su-ji	South Korea	229.50	19	Did not advance	
20	Elena Bertocchi	Italy	228.60	20	Did not advance	
21	Tilly Brown	Great Britain	227.60	21	Did not advance	
22	Wang Ziyi	Hong Kong	222.80	22	Did not advance	
23	Nina Janmyr	Sweden	220.20	23	Did not advance	
24	Sonya Palkhivala	Canada	218.75	24	Did not advance	
25	Kaja Skrzek	Poland	218.40	25	Did not advance	
26	Tereza Jelínková	Czech Republic	217.20	26	Did not advance	
27	Jung Da-yeon	South Korea	216.95	27	Did not advance	
28	Chan Tsz Ming	Hong Kong	216.70	28	Did not advance	
29	Elizabeth Pérez	Venezuela	215.75	29	Did not advance	
30	Anna Kwong	United States	215.35	30	Did not advance	
31	Caroline Kupka	Norway	214.90	31	Did not advance	
32	Bailey Heydra	South Africa	214.60	32	Did not advance	
33	Viktoriia Frolova	Neutral Athlete B	214.00	33	Did not advance	
34	Viviana Uribe	Colombia	213.20	34	Did not advance	
35	Juliette Landi	France	209.75	35	Did not advance	
36	Gladies Lariesa Garina	Indonesia	209.05	36	Did not advance	
37	Ana Ricci	Peru	206.40	37	Did not advance	
38	Luana Lira	Brazil	199.15	38	Did not advance	
39	Grace Brammer	South Africa	197.70	39	Did not advance	
40	Ashlee Tan	Singapore	196.85	40	Did not advance	
41	Laura Valore	Denmark	193.80	41	Did not advance	
42	Kim Ji-hye	North Korea	193.70	42	Did not advance	
43	Aleksandra Błażowska	Poland	188.80	43	Did not advance	
44	Kseniia Bochek	Ukraine	186.55	44	Did not advance	
45	Fong Kay Yian	Singapore	184.35	45	Did not advance	
46	Ariana Drake	Philippines	182.00	46	Did not advance	
47	Ivana Medková	Czech Republic	177.15	47	Did not advance	
48	Jacqueline Chen	Chinese Taipei	174.50	48	Did not advance	
49	Maggie Squire	New Zealand	167.30	49	Did not advance	
50	Nur Mufiidah Sudirman	Indonesia	151.30	50	Did not advance	
51	Barbara Chen	Chinese Taipei	145.75	51	Did not advance	
	Diana Karnafel	Ukraine	Withdrawn		Did not advance	
	Mariam Shanidze	Georgia	Did not start		Did not advance	
