= Diving at the 2025 World Aquatics Championships – Mixed synchronized 3 metre springboard =

Mixed synchronized 3 metre springboard at the Diving at the 2025 World Aquatics Championships
- Venue: OCBC Aquatic Centre
- Location: Singapore
- Dates: 30 July
- Competitors: 38 from 19 nations
- Teams: 19
- Winning points: 308.13

Medalists
gold medal	Matteo Santoro; Chiara Pellacani	Italy
silver medal	Cassiel Rousseau; Maddison Keeney	Australia
bronze medal	Cheng Zilong; Li Yajie	China

The Mixed synchronized 3 metre springboard competition at the 2025 World Aquatics Championships was held on 30 July 2025.

== Results ==
The final was held at 17:02.

Rank	Nation	Points
1st place, gold medalist(s)	Italy; Matteo Santoro; Chiara Pellacani	308.13
2nd place, silver medalist(s)	Australia; Cassiel Rousseau; Maddison Keeney	307.26
3rd place, bronze medalist(s)	China; Cheng Zilong; Li Yajie	305.70
4	Mexico; Osmar Olvera; Zyanya Parra	278.82
5	Neutral Athletes B Ilia Molchanov; Elizaveta Kuzina	273.84
6	North Korea; Ko Che-won; Kim Mi-hwa	267.63
7	United States; Luke Hernandez; Kyndal Knight	267.60
8	Germany; Luis Ávila Sánchez; Lena Hentschel	257.61
9	Poland; Andrzej Rzeszutek; Kaja Skrzek	250.44
10	Brazil; Miguel Cardoso; Anna Lúcia dos Santos	242.40
11	Venezuela; Jesús González; Elizabeth Pérez	236.28
12	Singapore; Max Lee; Ashlee Tan	233.91
13	Indonesia; Andriyan; Gladies Lariesa Garina	229.20
14	South Korea; Yi Jae-gyeong; Jung Da-yeon	228.72
15	Hong Kong; Robben Yiu; Wang Ziyi	222.69
16	Sweden; Elias Petersen; Nina Janmyr	221.34
17	Armenia; Vartan Bayanduryan; Aleksandra Bibikina	220.32
18	Macau; He Heung Wing; Zhao Hang U	184.62
19	Dominican Republic; Saymol Sánchez; Victoria Garza	146.76
	Great Britain; Noah Penman; Grace Reid	DNS
