= Diving at the 2025 World Aquatics Championships – Men's synchronized 10 metre platform =

Men's synchronized 10 metre platform at the Diving at the 2025 World Aquatics Championships
- Venue: OCBC Aquatic Centre
- Location: Singapore
- Dates: 29 July (preliminaries and final)
- Competitors: 40 from 20 nations
- Teams: 20
- Winning points: 429.63

Medalists
gold medal	Cheng Zilong; Zhu Zifeng	China
silver medal	Nikita Shleikher; Ruslan Ternovoi
bronze medal	Joshua Hedberg; Carson Tyler	United States

The Men's synchronized 10 metre platform competition at the 2025 World Aquatics Championships was held on 29 July 2025.

== Results ==
The preliminary round was started at 12:02. The final round was started at 17:32.

Green denotes finalists

Rank	Nation	Preliminary		Final	
Rank	Nation	Points	Rank	Points	Rank
1st place, gold medalist(s)	China; Cheng Zilong; Zhu Zifeng	423.33	1	429.63	1
2nd place, silver medalist(s)	Neutral Athletes B Nikita Shleikher; Ruslan Ternovoi	407.91	2	428.70	2
3rd place, bronze medalist(s)	United States; Joshua Hedberg; Carson Tyler	392.64	4	410.70	3
4	Great Britain; Kyle Kothari; Robbie Lee	394.86	3	399.27	4
5	Ukraine; Mark Hrytsenko; Oleksiy Sereda	392.49	5	391.23	5
6	Germany; Luis Avila Sanchez; Jaden Eikermann	373.14	8	377.37	6
7	Malaysia; Elvis Priestly Anak Clement; Enrique Harold	378.36	6	374.70	7
8	Japan; Shu Ohkubo; Rikuto Tamai	373.38	7	369.24	8
9	Mexico; Kevin Berlín; Randal Willars	356.94	9	Did not advance	
10	South Korea; Kang Min-hyuk; Shin Jung-whi	356.64	10	Did not advance	
11	Canada; Matt Cullen; Benjamin Tessier	343.41	11	Did not advance	
12	Italy; Simone Conte; Riccardo Giovannini	337.98	12	Did not advance	
13	North Korea; Jo Ryu-myong; Ko Che-won	335.61	13	Did not advance	
14	Australia; Jaxon Bowshire; Jonah Mercieca	333.09	14	Did not advance	
15	Brazil; Miguel Cardoso; Caio Dalmaso	320.58	15	Did not advance	
16	Cuba; Bernardo Arias; Carlos Ramos	320.43	16	Did not advance	
17	Austria; Anton Knoll; Dariush Lotfi	319.68	17	Did not advance	
18	Singapore; Max Lee; Ayden Ng	300.09	18	Did not advance	
19	India; Wilson Singh Ningthoujam; Indiver Sairem	299.88	19	Did not advance	
20	Indonesia; Andriyan; Muhamad Yudha Prastiyo	297.30	20	Did not advance	
