= Swimming at the 2025 World Aquatics Championships – Men's 100 metre breaststroke =

Men's 100 metre breaststroke at the 2025 World Aquatics Championships
- Venue: World Aquatics Championships Arena
- Location: Singapore Sports Hub, Kallang
- Dates: 27 July (heats and semifinals); 28 July (final)
- Competitors: 74 from 67 nations
- Winning time: 58.23

Medalists
| gold medal | Qin Haiyang | China |
| silver medal | Nicolò Martinenghi | Italy |
| bronze medal | Denis Petrashov | Kyrgyzstan |

The men's 100 metre breaststroke event at the 2025 World Aquatics Championships was held from 27 to 28 July 2025 at the World Aquatics Championships Arena at the Singapore Sports Hub in Kallang, Singapore.

== Background ==
The event brought together a closely matched field following the slower-than-expected final at the Paris 2024 Olympics. China’s Qin Haiyang, the 2023 World Champion and the only swimmer of 2025 under 58.7 seconds (58.61), was the favourite after a disappointing Olympic performance considered unrepresentative of his usual form. Italy’s Olympic champion Nicolò Martinenghi, despite declining times, was expected to remain a medal contender, while fellow Italian Ludovico Viberti had recorded 59.04 in 2025. Germany’s Lucas Matzerath and Melvin Imoudu, fourth and fifth in Paris, were speculated to possibly deliver the country’s strongest 100 m breaststroke showing since 1978. Young competitors included American Campbell McKean (58.96) and China’s Dong Zhihao (59.06).

== Qualification ==
Each National Federation was permitted to enter a maximum of two qualified athletes in each individual event, but they could do so only if both of them had attained the "A" standard qualification time. For this event, the "A" standard qualification time was 59.75 seconds. Federations could enter one athlete into the event if they met the "B" standard qualification time. For this event, the "B" standard qualification time was 1:01.84 seconds. Athletes could also enter the event if they had met an "A" or "B" standard in a different event and their Federation had not entered anyone else. Additional considerations applied to Federations who had few swimmers enter through the standard qualification times. Federations in this category could at least enter two men and two women to the competition, all of whom could enter into up to two events.

Top 10 fastest qualification times
| Swimmer | Country | Time | Competition |
|---|---|---|---|
| Adam Peaty | Great Britain | 57.94 | 2024 British Championships |
| Qin Haiyang | China | 58.24 | 2024 Chinese Championships |
| Evgenii Somov | Individual Neutral Athletes | 58.72 | 2024 Atlanta Classic |
| Sun Jiajun | China | 58.73 | 2024 Chinese Championships |
| Sam Williamson | Australia | 58.80 | 2024 Australian Olympic Trials |
| Melvin Imoudu | Germany | 58.84 | 2024 European Championships |
| Nicolò Martinenghi | Italy | 58.90 | 2024 Sette Colli |
| Campbell McKean | United States | 58.96 | 2025 United States Championships |
| Arno Kamminga | Netherlands | 58.96 | 2024 AP Race London |
| Ludovico Viberti | Italy | 59.04 | 2025 Italian Championships |

== Records ==
Prior to the competition, the existing world and championship records were as follows.

| World record | Adam Peaty (GBR) | 56.88 | Gwangju, South Korea | 21 July 2019 |
| Competition record | Adam Peaty (GBR) | 56.88 | Gwangju, South Korea | 21 July 2019 |

== Heats ==
The heats took place on 27 July at 12:06. Russia's Kirill Prigoda, representing the Neutral Athletes B team in this competition, swam 58.53 to break his country's national record.

| Rank | Heat | Lane | Name | Nationality | Time | Notes |
|---|---|---|---|---|---|---|
| 1 | 6 | 2 | Kirill Prigoda | Neutral Athletes B | 58.53 | Q, NR (Note: National record for Russia, though he was representing the Neutral Athletes B team.) |
| 2 | 6 | 3 | Lucas Matzerath | Germany | 58.75 | Q |
| 3 | 6 | 4 | Nicolò Martinenghi | Italy | 58.84 | Q |
| 4 | 6 | 5 | Caspar Corbeau | Netherlands | 59.03 | Q |
| 5 | 8 | 4 | Qin Haiyang | China | 59.13 | Q |
| 6 | 7 | 3 | Josh Matheny | United States | 59.40 | Q |
| 7 | 8 | 3 | Dong Zhihao | China | 59.46 | Q |
| 8 | 8 | 6 | Denis Petrashov | Kyrgyzstan | 59.53 | Q |
| 9 | 7 | 5 | Ludovico Viberti | Italy | 59.56 | Q |
| 10 | 7 | 4 | Melvin Imoudu | Germany | 59.58 | Q |
| 11 | 6 | 6 | Ilya Shymanovich | Neutral Athletes A | 59.59 | Q |
| 12 | 7 | 2 | Taku Taniguchi | Japan | 59.75 | Q |
| 13 | 7 | 1 | Gregory Butler | Great Britain | 59.87 | Q |
| 14 | 8 | 7 | Danil Semianinov | Neutral Athletes B | 59.92 | Q |
| 15 | 8 | 5 | Campbell McKean | United States | 59.98 | Q |
| 15 | 8 | 2 | Andrius Šidlauskas | Lithuania | 59.98 | Q |
| 17 | 8 | 1 | Choi Dong-yeol | South Korea | 59.99 | |
| 18 | 7 | 6 | Yamato Fukasawa | Japan | 1:00.23 | |
| 19 | 6 | 1 | Dawid Wiekiera | Poland | 1:00.27 | |
| 20 | 8 | 8 | Nash Wilkes | Australia | 1:00.42 | |
| 21 | 8 | 0 | Eoin Corby | Ireland | 1:00.63 | |
| 21 | 8 | 9 | Ronan Wantenaar | Namibia | 1:00.63 | |
| 23 | 6 | 7 | Aleksas Savickas | Lithuania | 1:00.64 | |
| 24 | 5 | 4 | Volodymyr Lisovets | Ukraine | 1:00.81 | |
| 25 | 5 | 6 | Chris Smith | South Africa | 1:00.85 | |
| 26 | 7 | 8 | Nil Cadevall | Spain | 1:00.93 | |
| 26 | 6 | 8 | Lyubomir Epitropov | Bulgaria | 1:00.93 | |
| 28 | 6 | 9 | Miguel de Lara | Mexico | 1:01.01 | |
| 29 | 7 | 9 | Finlay Knox | Canada | 1:01.05 | |
| 30 | 7 | 7 | Bernhard Reitshammer | Austria | 1:01.09 | |
| 31 | 4 | 5 | Nusrat Allahverdi | Turkey | 1:01.11 | |
| 32 | 5 | 0 | Savvas Thomoglou | Greece | 1:01.13 | |
| 33 | 5 | 3 | Adam Mak | Hong Kong | 1:01.17 | |
| 34 | 4 | 3 | Jørgen Scheie Bråthen | Norway | 1:01.29 | |
| 35 | 5 | 8 | Filip Mujan | Croatia | 1:01.42 | |
| 36 | 5 | 2 | Jonas Gaur | Denmark | 1:01.56 | |
| 37 | 5 | 1 | Einar Margeir Ágústsson | Iceland | 1:01.64 | |
| 38 | 4 | 6 | Jhang Wei-tang | Chinese Taipei | 1:01.86 | |
| 39 | 5 | 7 | Mariano Lazzerini | Chile | 1:01.89 | |
| 40 | 4 | 1 | Likhith Selvaraj Prema | India | 1:01.99 | |
| 41 | 5 | 5 | Chan Chun Ho | Singapore | 1:02.00 | |
| 42 | 7 | 0 | Gur Itzhaki | Israel | 1:02.26 | |
| 43 | 4 | 4 | Daniel Kertes | Sweden | 1:02.34 | |
| 44 | 5 | 9 | Joao Carneiro | Luxembourg | 1:02.38 | |
| 45 | 6 | 0 | Arsen Kozhakhmetov | Kazakhstan | 1:02.61 | |
| 46 | 3 | 3 | Chao Man Hou | Macau | 1:02.64 | |
| 47 | 3 | 2 | Jacob Story | Cook Islands | 1:02.93 | NR |
| 48 | 3 | 5 | Amro Al-Wir | Jordan | 1:03.00 | |
| 49 | 4 | 9 | Kito Campbell | Jamaica | 1:03.09 | |
| 50 | 4 | 2 | Daniils Bobrovs | Latvia | 1:03.19 | |
| 51 | 4 | 8 | Adrian Robinson | Botswana | 1:03.22 | |
| 52 | 1 | 7 | Josué Domínguez | Dominican Republic | 1:03.76 | |
| 53 | 1 | 6 | Samy Boutouil | Morocco | 1:04.02 | |
| 54 | 4 | 7 | Denis Svet | Moldova | 1:04.11 | |
| 55 | 3 | 4 | Panayiotis Panaretos | Cyprus | 1:04.25 | |
| 56 | 2 | 4 | Haniel Kudwoli | Kenya | 1:04.92 | NR |
| 57 | 2 | 9 | Mohammed Al-Otaibi | Saudi Arabia | 1:05.02 | |
| 58 | 2 | 5 | Zach Moyo | Zambia | 1:05.64 | NR |
| 59 | 3 | 7 | Abobakr Abass | Sudan | 1:05.79 | |
| 60 | 1 | 4 | Mohammed Al-Khalidi | Iraq | 1:05.87 | |
| 61 | 3 | 9 | Jayden Loran | Curaçao | 1:06.10 | |
| 62 | 2 | 3 | Samuel Yalimaiwai | Fiji | 1:06.37 | |
| 63 | 2 | 6 | Saud Ghali | Bahrain | 1:06.50 | |
| 64 | 3 | 1 | Luis Weekes | Barbados | 1:06.80 | |
| 65 | 1 | 5 | Cory Werrett | Zimbabwe | 1:07.23 | |
| 66 | 3 | 8 | Mark Thompson | Bahamas | 1:08.56 | |
| 67 | 1 | 3 | Khaled Al-Otaibi | Kuwait | 1:08.61 | |
| 68 | 1 | 2 | Kouki Watanabe | Northern Mariana Islands | 1:08.90 | |
| 69 | 2 | 7 | Anas Ganedi | Libya | 1:09.89 | NR |
| 70 | 2 | 1 | Fahim Anwari | Afghanistan | 1:10.62 | |
| 71 | 2 | 2 | Chadd Ning | Eswatini | 1:11.58 | |
| 72 | 2 | 8 | Mustafa Hashim | Somalia | 1:16.69 | |
| — | 2 | 0 | Alfousseine Fofana | Ivory Coast | Did not start | |
| — | 4 | 0 | Andrew Goh | Malaysia | Did not start | |
| — | 3 | 0 | Ashot Chakhoyan | Armenia | Disqualified | |
| — | 3 | 6 | Esteban Nuñez | Bolivia | Disqualified | |

== Semifinals ==
The semifinals took place on 27 July at 19:49.

Italy's Nicolò Martinenghi was initially disqualified after finishing second in the second semifinal due a performing a dolphin kick into the wall. This is later overruled with Martinenghi and the ninth fastest semifinalist Neutral Athlete B Danil Semianinov both advancing to the final.

| Rank | Heat | Lane | Name | Nationality | Time | Notes |
|---|---|---|---|---|---|---|
| 1 | 2 | 3 | Qin Haiyang | China | 58.24 | Q |
| 2 | 2 | 5 | Nicolò Martinenghi | Italy | 58.62 | Q |
| 3 | 2 | 2 | Ludovico Viberti | Italy | 58.89 | Q |
| 4 | 1 | 4 | Lucas Matzerath | Germany | 58.93 | Q |
| 5 | 1 | 3 | Josh Matheny | United States | 59.15 | Q |
| 6 | 1 | 5 | Caspar Corbeau | Netherlands | 59.17 | Q |
| 7 | 1 | 6 | Denis Petrashov | Kyrgyzstan | 59.20 | Q, NR |
| 8 | 2 | 4 | Kirill Prigoda | Neutral Athletes B | 59.36 | Q |
| 9 | 1 | 1 | Danil Semianinov | Neutral Athletes B | 59.39 | Q |
| 10 | 1 | 2 | Melvin Imoudu | Germany | 59.43 | |
| 10 | 2 | 6 | Dong Zhihao | China | 59.43 | |
| 12 | 2 | 7 | Ilya Shymanovich | Neutral Athletes A | 59.44 | |
| 13 | 2 | 1 | Gregory Butler | Great Britain | 59.53 | |
| 14 | 1 | 7 | Taku Taniguchi | Japan | 59.59 | |
| 15 | 1 | 8 | Campbell McKean | United States | 59.74 | |
| 16 | 2 | 8 | Andrius Šidlauskas | Lithuania | 1:00.03 | |

== Final ==
The final took place on 28 July at 19:02.

| Rank | Lane | Name | Nationality | Time | Notes |
|---|---|---|---|---|---|
| 1st place, gold medalist(s) | 4 | Qin Haiyang | China | 58.23 | |
| 2nd place, silver medalist(s) | 5 | Nicolò Martinenghi | Italy | 58.58 | |
| 3rd place, bronze medalist(s) | 1 | Denis Petrashov | Kyrgyzstan | 58.88 | NR |
| 4 | 7 | Caspar Corbeau | Netherlands | 59.06 | |
| 5 | 3 | Ludovico Viberti | Italy | 59.08 | |
| 6 | 6 | Lucas Matzerath | Germany | 59.14 | |
| 7 | 2 | Josh Matheny | United States | 59.26 | |
| 8 | 0 | Danil Semianinov | Neutral Athletes B | 59.55 | |
| | 8 | Kirill Prigoda | Neutral Athletes B | Disqualified | |
