= Diving at the 2022 World Aquatics Championships – Mixed synchronized 3 metre springboard =

Mixed synchronized 3 metre springboard at the 2022 World Aquatics Championships
- Venue: Danube Arena
- Location: Budapest, Hungary
- Dates: 29 June
- Competitors: 26 from 13 nations
- Teams: 13
- Winning points: 324.15

Medalists
gold medal	Zhu Zifeng; Lin Shan	China
silver medal	Matteo Santoro; Chiara Pellacani	Italy
bronze medal	James Heatly; Grace Reid	Great Britain

The Mixed synchronized 3 metre springboard competition at the 2022 World Aquatics Championships was held on 29 June 2022.

== Results ==
The event was started at 19:00.

Rank	Nation	Divers	Points
1st place, gold medalist(s)	China	Zhu Zifeng; Lin Shan	324.15
2nd place, silver medalist(s)	Italy	Matteo Santoro; Chiara Pellacani	293.55
3rd place, bronze medalist(s)	Great Britain	James Heatly; Grace Reid	287.61
4	Mexico	Kevin Muñoz; Arantxa Chávez	282.42
5	Germany	Lou Massenberg; Tina Punzel	277.62
6	South Korea	Yi Jaeg-yeong; Kim Su-ji	275.82
7	Malaysia	Muhammad Puteh; Ng Yan Yee	275.46
8	United States	Quentin Henninger; Kristen Hayden	271.86
9	Japan	Haruki Suyama; Haruka Enomoto	266.46
10	Switzerland	Guillaume Dutoit; Madeline Coquoz	254.31
11	France	Jules Bouyer; Naïs Gillet	243.51
12	Brazil	Rafael Fogaça; Anna Lúcia Rodrigues	234.60
13	New Zealand	Frazer Tavener; Maggie Squire	223.86
