= Diving at the 2023 World Aquatics Championships – Mixed synchronized 3 metre springboard =

Mixed synchronized 3 metre springboard at the 2023 World Aquatics Championships
- Venue: Fukuoka Prefectural Pool
- Location: Fukuoka, Japan
- Dates: 22 July
- Competitors: 32 from 16 nations
- Teams: 16
- Winning points: 326.10

Medalists
gold medal	Zhu Zifeng; Lin Shan	China
silver medal	Domonic Bedggood; Maddison Keeney	Australia
bronze medal	Matteo Santoro; Chiara Pellacani	Italy

The mixed synchronized 3 metre springboard competition at the 2023 World Aquatics Championships was held on 22 July 2023.

== Results ==
The final was started at 15:30.

Rank	Nation	Divers	Points
1st place, gold medalist(s)	China	Zhu Zifeng; Lin Shan	326.10
2nd place, silver medalist(s)	Australia	Domonic Bedggood; Maddison Keeney	307.38
3rd place, bronze medalist(s)	Italy	Matteo Santoro; Chiara Pellacani	294.12
4	South Korea	Yi Jae-gyeong; Kim Su-ji	281.46
5	Sweden	Elias Petersen; Emilia Nilsson Garip	276.60
6	Mexico	Jahir Ocampo; Aranza Vázquez	273.90
7	Germany	Alexander Lube; Jana Rother	270.45
8	United States	Jack Ryan; Krysta Palmer	263.88
9	Egypt	Mohamed Farouk; Maha Eissa	256.08
10	Poland	Andrzej Rzeszutek; Kaja Skrzek	255.15
11	Venezuela	Jesús González; Elizabeth Pérez	248.10
12	Spain	Carlos Camacho; Rocío Velázquez	245.88
13	New Zealand	Frazer Tavener; Maggie Squire	241.50
14	Brazil	Rafael Max; Anna Santos	239.40
15	Ireland	Jake Passmore; Clare Cryan	237.18
16	Macau	He Heung Wing; Choi Sut Kuan	184.02
	Canada	Bryden Hattie; Pamela Ware	Did not start
