= Swimming at the 2025 World Aquatics Championships – Men's 200 metre freestyle =

Men's 200 metre freestyle at the 2025 World Aquatics Championships
- Venue: World Aquatics Championships Arena
- Location: Singapore Sports Hub, Kallang
- Dates: 28 July (heats and semifinals); 29 July (final)
- Competitors: 59 from 53 nations
- Winning time: 1:43.53

Medalists
| gold medal | David Popovici | Romania |
| silver medal | Luke Hobson | United States |
| bronze medal | Tatsuya Murasa | Japan |

The men's 200 metre freestyle event at the 2025 World Aquatics Championships was held from 28 to 29 July 2025 at the World Aquatics Championships Arena at the Singapore Sports Hub in Kallang, Singapore.

== Background ==
The event featured one of the fastest fields since the supersuit era. Romania’s David Popovici entered as the top seed with the 1:43.13 he swam at the 2024 European Championships, the closest he has been to his 1:42.97 best, and he also leads the 2025 world rankings with 1:43.64. The United States’ Luke Hobson follows with a 1:43.73 from the 2025 US Nationals. Great Britain’s Matt Richards and the US’ Gabriel Jett were seeded in 1:44.69 and 1:44.70 respectively. Other key contenders included Lithuania’s Danas Rapšys, South Korea’s Hwang Sun-woo, Australia’s Edward Sommerville, and China’s Pan Zhanle, all of whom had recorded sub-1:45 times.

== Qualification ==
Each National Federation was permitted to enter a maximum of two qualified athletes in each individual event, but they could do so only if both of them had attained the "A" standard qualification time at approved qualifying events. For this event, the "A" standard qualification time was 1:46.70. Federations could enter one athlete into the event if they met the "B" standard qualification time. For this event, the "B" standard qualification time was 1:50.43. Athletes could also enter the event if they had met an "A" or "B" standard in a different event and their Federation had not entered anyone else. Additional considerations applied to Federations who had few swimmers enter through the standard qualification times. Federations in this category could at least enter two men and two women to the competition, all of whom could enter into up to two events.

Top 10 fastest qualification times (Note: Only including swimmers who were on the start list for this event)
| Swimmer | Country | Time | Competition |
|---|---|---|---|
| Luke Hobson | United States | 1:43.73 | 2025 United States Championships |
| Matt Richards | Great Britain | 1:44.69 | 2024 British Championships |
| Gabriel Jett | United States | 1:44.70 | 2025 United States Championships |
| Hwang Sun-woo | South Korea | 1:44.90 | 2024 Korean Championships |
| Edward Sommerville | Australia | 1:44.93 | 2025 Australian Trials |
| James Guy | Great Britain | 1:45.04 | 2024 Summer Olympics |
| David Popovici | Romania | 1:45.07 | 2025 Romanian Championships |
| Pan Zhanle | China | 1:45.45 | 2025 Chinese Championships |
| Danas Rapsys | Lithuania | 1:45.46 | 2024 Summer Olympics |

== Records ==
Prior to the competition, the existing world and championship records were as follows.

| World record | Paul Biedermann (GER) | 1:42.00 | Rome, Italy | 28 July 2009 |
| Competition record | Paul Biedermann (GER) | 1:42.00 | Rome, Italy | 28 July 2009 |

== Heats ==
The heats took place on 28 July 11:04.

| Rank | Heat | Lane | Swimmer | Nation | Time | Notes |
|---|---|---|---|---|---|---|
| 1 | 6 | 3 | David Popovici | Romania | 1:45.43 | Q |
| 2 | 6 | 4 | Luke Hobson | United States | 1:45.61 | Q |
| 3 | 5 | 4 | Matt Richards | Great Britain | 1:45.66 | Q |
| 4 | 4 | 4 | Gabriel Jett | United States | 1:45.91 | Q |
| 5 | 6 | 5 | Tatsuya Murasa | Japan | 1:45.92 | Q |
| 6 | 5 | 6 | Flynn Southam | Australia | 1:46.00 | Q |
| 7 | 6 | 7 | Lucas Henveaux | Belgium | 1:46.03 | Q, NR |
| 8 | 6 | 5 | Hwang Sun-woo | South Korea | 1:46.12 | Q |
| 9 | 5 | 7 | Zhang Zhanshuo | China | 1:46.17 | Q |
| 10 | 4 | 5 | James Guy | Great Britain | 1:46.19 | Q |
| 11 | 6 | 8 | Dimitrios Markos | Greece | 1:46.28 | Q, NR |
| 12 | 4 | 2 | Kamil Sieradzki | Poland | 1:46.31 | Q |
| 13 | 4 | 6 | Filippo Megli | Italy | 1:46.39 | Q |
| 14 | 4 | 8 | Sander Sorensen | Norway | 1:46.63 | Q |
| 15 | 6 | 0 | Evan Bailey | Ireland | 1:46.66 | Q, =NR |
| 16 | 5 | 2 | Carlos D'Ambrosio | Italy | 1:46.67 | Q |
| 17 | 5 | 5 | Edward Sommerville | Australia | 1:46.72 | |
| 18 | 6 | 2 | Robin Hanson | Sweden | 1:46.96 | |
| 19 | 3 | 5 | Oliver Søgaard-Andersen | Denmark | 1:47.25 | |
| 20 | 4 | 1 | Tomas Koski | Finland | 1:47.34 | |
| 21 | 5 | 1 | Lee Ho-joon | South Korea | 1:47.36 | |
| 22 | 5 | 3 | Pan Zhanle | China | 1:47.46 | |
| 23 | 5 | 0 | Alexey Glivinskiy | Israel | 1:47.54 | |
| 24 | 4 | 3 | Danas Rapšys | Lithuania | 1:47.58 | |
| 25 | 2 | 4 | Ralph Daleiden Ciuferri | Luxembourg | 1:47.74 | NR |
| 26 | 3 | 7 | Petar Mitsin | Bulgaria | 1:47.88 | |
| 27 | 4 | 7 | Antonio Djakovic | Switzerland | 1:47.96 | |
| 28 | 6 | 9 | Velimir Stjepanović | Serbia | 1:48.04 | |
| 29 | 4 | 0 | Guilherme Costa | Brazil | 1:48.06 | |
| 30 | 3 | 0 | Balázs Holló | Hungary | 1:48.09 | |
| 31 | 3 | 6 | Khiew Hoe Yean | Malaysia | 1:48.10 | |
| 32 | 5 | 9 | Matthew Sates | South Africa | 1:48.45 | |
| 33 | 3 | 4 | Miguel Pérez-Godoy | Spain | 1:48.46 | |
| 34 | 3 | 8 | Kenan Dračić | Bosnia and Herzegovina | 1:48.59 | |
| 35 | 5 | 8 | Niko Janković | Croatia | 1:48.74 | |
| 36 | 3 | 1 | Juan Morales | Colombia | 1:48.95 | |
| 37 | 6 | 1 | Antoine Sauve | Canada | 1:49.19 | |
| 38 | 3 | 3 | Sašo Boškan | Slovenia | 1:49.47 | |
| 39 | 3 | 9 | František Jablčník | Slovakia | 1:50.21 | |
| 40 | 3 | 2 | Jonathan Tan | Singapore | 1:50.56 | |
| 41 | 2 | 2 | Enkhtamir Batbayar | Mongolia | 1:50.83 | NR |
| 42 | 2 | 5 | Adrian Eichler | Philippines | 1:51.39 | |
| 43 | 2 | 6 | Sajan Prakash | India | 1:51.57 | |
| 44 | 4 | 9 | Nikoli Blackman | Trinidad and Tobago | 1:51.63 | |
| 45 | 2 | 3 | Pongpanod Trithan | Thailand | 1:51.66 | |
| 46 | 2 | 7 | Omar Abbass | Syria | 1:53.11 | |
| 47 | 2 | 0 | Sauod Al-Shamroukh | Kuwait | 1:54.61 | |
| 48 | 2 | 8 | Sebastian Serafeim | Honduras | 1:55.85 | |
| 49 | 2 | 1 | Alberto Vega | Costa Rica | 1:55.87 | |
| 50 | 1 | 7 | Lucas de los Santos | Uruguay | 1:56.34 | |
| 51 | 1 | 3 | Andrey Villarreal Bernal | Panama | 1:57.94 | |
| 52 | 2 | 9 | Kaeden Gleason | Virgin Islands | 1:58.83 | |
| 53 | 1 | 5 | Mohammed Jibali | Libya | 1:58.97 | |
| 54 | 1 | 8 | Binura Thalagala | Sri Lanka | 1:58.98 | |
| 55 | 1 | 4 | Phone Pyae Han | Myanmar | 2:00.90 | |
| 56 | 1 | 9 | Ali Al-Hasni | Oman | 2:01.31 | |
| 57 | 1 | 1 | Ervin Shrestha | Nepal | 2:02.83 | |
| 58 | 1 | 6 | Haziq Samil | Brunei | 2:04.05 | |
| 59 | 1 | 0 | Ocean Campus | Guam | 2:05.98 | |
| | 1 | 2 | Rohan Shearer | Cape Verde | Did not start | |

== Semifinals ==
The semifinals took place on 28 July at 20:08.

| Rank | Heat | Lane | Swimmer | Nation | Time | Notes |
|---|---|---|---|---|---|---|
| 1 | 1 | 4 | Luke Hobson | United States | 1:44.80 | Q |
| 2 | 1 | 6 | Hwang Sun-woo | South Korea | 1:44.84 | Q |
| 3 | 1 | 7 | Kamil Sieradzki | Poland | 1:45.00 | Q, NR |
| 4 | 2 | 4 | David Popovici | Romania | 1:45.02 | Q |
| 5 | 1 | 8 | Carlos D'Ambrosio | Italy | 1:45.23 | Q, NR |
| 6 | 2 | 3 | Tatsuya Murasa | Japan | 1:45.39 | Q |
| 7 | 1 | 2 | James Guy | Great Britain | 1:45.50 | Q |
| 8 | 1 | 5 | Gabriel Jett | United States | 1:45.60 | Q |
| 9 | 1 | 1 | Sander Sørensen | Norway | 1:45.78 | NR |
| 10 | 1 | 3 | Flynn Southam | Australia | 1:45.80 | |
| 11 | 2 | 2 | Zhang Zhanshuo | China | 1:45.84 | |
| 12 | 2 | 5 | Matt Richards | Great Britain | 1:45.85 | |
| 13 | 2 | 6 | Lucas Henveaux | Belgium | 1:46.23 | |
| 14 | 2 | 1 | Filippo Megli | Italy | 1:46.49 | |
| 15 | 2 | 7 | Dimitrios Markos | Greece | 1:47.01 | |
| 16 | 2 | 8 | Evan Bailey | Ireland | 1:48.75 | |

== Final ==
The final took place on 29 July.

| Rank | Lane | Name | Nationality | Time | Notes |
|---|---|---|---|---|---|
| 1st place, gold medalist(s) | 6 | David Popovici | Romania | 1:43.53 | |
| 2nd place, silver medalist(s) | 4 | Luke Hobson | United States | 1:43.84 | |
| 3rd place, bronze medalist(s) | 7 | Tatsuya Murasa | Japan | 1:44.54 | NR |
| 4 | 5 | Hwang Sun-woo | South Korea | 1:44.72 | |
| 5 | 3 | Kamil Sieradzki | Poland | 1:45.22 | |
| 6 | 2 | Carlos D'Ambrosio | Italy | 1:45.27 | |
| 7 | 1 | James Guy | Great Britain | 1:45.28 | |
| 8 | 8 | Gabriel Jett | United States | 1:45.92 | |
