= Great Britain at the 2025 World Aquatics Championships =

- Flag of Great Britain
- World Aquatics code: GBR
- National federation: British Swimming
- Website: usaquaticsports.org

in Singapore
- Competitors: 71 in 5 sports
- Medals Ranked 15th: Gold 1 Silver 2 Bronze 2 Total 5

World Aquatics Championships appearances
- 1973; 1975; 1978; 1982; 1986; 1991; 1994; 1998; 2001; 2003; 2005; 2007; 2009; 2011; 2013; 2015; 2017; 2019; 2022; 2023; 2024; 2025

Great Britain competed at the 2025 World Aquatics Championships in Singapore from July 11 to August 3, 2025.

== Athletes by discipline ==
| Sport | Men | Women | Total |
|---|---|---|---|
| Artistic swimming | 1 | 12 | 13 |
| Diving | 6 | 8 | 14 |
| Open water swimming | 1 | 0 | 1 |
| Swimming | 16 | 12 | 28 |
| Water polo | 0 | 15 | 15 |
| Total | 24 | 47 | 71 |

== Medalists ==
| Medal | Name | Sport | Event | Date |
|---|---|---|---|---|
| 1st place, gold medalist(s) | Matt Richards; James Guy; Jack McMillan; Duncan Scott; Evan Jones; Tom Dean | Swimming | Men's 4 × 200 metre freestyle relay | 1 August 2025 |
| 2nd place, silver medalist(s) | Yasmin Harper; Scarlett Mew Jensen | Diving | Women's 3 m synchronized springboard | 29 July 2025 |
| 2nd place, silver medalist(s) | Ben Proud | Swimming | Men's 50 metre freestyle | 2 August 2025 |
| 3rd place, bronze medalist(s) | Ranjuo Tomblin; Isabelle Thorpe | Artistic swimming | Mixed duet free routine | 25 July 2025 |
| 3rd place, bronze medalist(s) | Anthony Harding; Jack Laugher | Diving | Men's 3 m synchronized springboard | 28 July 2025 |

== Artistic swimming ==
Men

| Athlete | Event | Preliminaries | | Final | |
| Athlete | Event | Points | Rank | Points | Rank |
|---|---|---|---|---|---|
| Ranjuo Tomblin | Solo technical routine | —N/a | | 228.4316 | 5 |
| Ranjuo Tomblin | Solo free routine | —N/a | | 210.9125 | 4 |

Women

| Athlete | Event | Preliminaries | | Final | |
| Athlete | Event | Points | Rank | Points | Rank |
|---|---|---|---|---|---|
| Loya Cenkci | Solo technical routine | 213.2850 | 21 | Did not advance | |
| Robyn Swatman; Eve Young | Duet technical routine | 233.1983 | 25 | Did not advance | |
| Robyn Swatman; Eve Young | Duet free routine | 230.3952 | 12 Q | 210.9404 | 12 |
| Robyn Ashworth; Katherine Boitsidis; Loya Cenkci; Jessica Hinxman; Holly Hughes; Pia Lanham; Sophie Rowney; Magdalena Townsend; Cara Zeidler | Team free routine | 223.3776 | 14 | Did not advance | |
| Robyn Ashworth; Katherine Boitsidis; Loya Cenkci; Jessica Hinxman; Holly Hughes; Pia Lanham; Sophie Rowney; Magdalena Townsend; Cara Zeidler | Team technical routine | 227.8151 | 17 | Did not advance | |

Mixed

| Athlete | Event | Preliminaries | | Final | |
| Athlete | Event | Points | Rank | Points | Rank |
|---|---|---|---|---|---|
| Ranjuo Tomblin; Isabelle Thorpe | Duet free routine | —N/a | | 322.0583 | 3rd place, bronze medalist(s) |
| Ranjuo Tomblin; Isabelle Thorpe | Duet technical routine | —N/a | | 226.0899 | 4 |

== Diving ==
20 athletes were named to the World Championships roster.

Men

| Athlete | Event | Preliminaries | | Semi-finals | | Final | |
| Athlete | Event | Points | Rank | Points | Rank | Points | Rank |
|---|---|---|---|---|---|---|---|
| Jordan Houlden | 1 m springboard | 407.45 | 2 Q | —N/a | | 405.15 | 4 |
| Noah Penman | 1 m springboard | 337.05 | 17 | —N/a | | Did not advance | |
| Jordan Houlden | 3 m springboard | 441.85 | 5 Q | 461.60 | 4 Q | 492.10 | 4 |
| Jack Laugher | 3 m springboard | 360.80 | 26 | Did not advance | | | |
| Anthony Harding; Jack Laugher | 3 m synchronized springboard | 394.29 | 3 Q | —N/a | | 405.33 | 3rd place, bronze medalist(s) |
| Robbie Lee | 10 m platform | 431.10 | 11 Q | 421.20 | 12 Q | 433.85 | 12 |
| Euan McCabe | 10 m platform | 412.55 | 13 Q | 368.15 | 18 | Did not advance | |
| Kyle Kothari; Robbie Lee | 10 m synchronized platform | 394.86 | 3 Q | —N/a | | 399.27 | 4 |

Women

| Athlete | Event | Preliminaries | | Semi-finals | | Final | |
| Athlete | Event | Points | Rank | Points | Rank | Points | Rank |
|---|---|---|---|---|---|---|---|
| Tilly Brown | 1 m springboard | 227.60 | 21 | —N/a | | Did not advance | |
| Yasmin Harper | 1 m springboard | 258.35 | 5 | —N/a | | 258.45 | 8 |
| Grace Reid | 3 m springboard | 283.90 | 11 Q | 277.65 | 14 | Did not advance | |
| Amy Rollinson | 3 m springboard | 230.70 | 33 | Did not advance | | | |
| Yasmin Harper; Scarlett Mew Jensen | 3 m synchronized springboard | 294.03 | 2 Q | —N/a | | 298.35 | 2nd place, silver medalist(s) |
| Maisie Bond | 10 m platform | 305.80 | 7 Q | 271.30 | 13 | Did not advance | |
| Maisie Bond; Lois Toulon | 10 m synchronized platform | 285.54 | 3 Q | —N/a | | 282.54 | 5 |

Mixed

| Athlete | Event | Final | |
| Athlete | Event | Points | Rank |
|---|---|---|---|
| Noah Penman; Grace Reid | 3 m synchronized springboard | DNS | |

== Open water swimming ==
Men

| Athlete | Event | Time | Rank |
|---|---|---|---|
| Hector Pardoe | Men's 10 km | 2:05:38.0 | 25 |

== Swimming ==
On April 24th, 2025, 28 athletes were named to the World Championships team. In qualification for the 200 metre freestyle event Duncan Scott and James Guy tied for the final qualification place. In the end James Guy was chosen to represent Great Britain in the event.

Men

| Athlete | Event | Heat | | Semi-final | | Final | |
| Athlete | Event | Time | Rank | Time | Rank | Time | Rank |
|---|---|---|---|---|---|---|---|
| Jacob Mills | 50 m freestyle | 22.15 | 28 | Did not advance | | | |
| Ben Proud | 50 m freestyle | 21.71 | 8 Q | 21.61 | 6 Q | 21.26 | 2nd place, silver medalist(s) |
| Jacob Mills | 100 m freestyle | 48.54 | 23 | Did not advance | | | |
| Matt Richards | 100 m freestyle | 47.89 | 7 Q | 47.59 | 6 Q | 47.74 | 8 |
| James Guy | 200 m freestyle | 1:46.19 | 10 Q | 1:45.50 | 7 Q | 1:45.28 | 7 |
| Matt Richards | 200 m freestyle | 1:45.66 | 3 Q | 1:45.85 | 12 | Did not advance | |
| Jack McMillan | 400 m freestyle | 3:47.28 | 14 | —N/a | | Did not advance | |
| Jonathon Marshall | 50 m backstroke | 25.38 | 37 | Did not advance | | | |
| Oliver Morgan | 50 m backstroke | 24.56 | 4 Q | 24.64 | 10 | Did not advance | |
| Jonathon Marshall | 100 m backstroke | 53.91 | 19 | Did not advance | | | |
| Oliver Morgan | 100 m backstroke | 52.93 | 9 Q | 52.41 | 5 Q | 52.37 | 5 |
| Luke Greenbank | 200 m backstroke | 1:55.27 | 2 Q | 1:55.64 | 8 Q | 1:56.26 | 8 |
| Oliver Morgan | 200 m backstroke | 1:57.57 | 21 | Did not advance | | | |
| Max Morgan | 50 m breaststroke | 27.50 | 29 | Did not advance | | | |
| Greg Butler | 100 m breaststroke | 59.87 | 13 Q | 59.53 | 13 | Did not advance | |
| Greg Butler | 200 m breaststroke | 2:10.60 | 8 Q | 2:09.60 | 9 | Did not advance | |
| Ben Proud | 50 m butterfly | 22.96 | 5 Q | 22.74 | 3 Q | 22.79 | 5 |
| Ed Mildred | 100 m butterfly | 51.36 | =11 Q | 51.61 | 15 | Did not advance | |
| Ed Mildred | 200 m butterfly | 1:56.17 | 14 Q | 1:56.13 | 15 | Did not advance | |
| Tom Dean | 200 m individual medley | 2:00.76 | 23 | Did not advance | | | |
| Duncan Scott | 200 m individual medley | 1:58.00 | 5 Q | 1:55.51 | 3 Q | 1:56.32 | 4 |
| Max Litchfield | 400 m individual medley | 4:11.41 | 4 Q | —N/a | | 4:12.77 | 7 |
| Jacob Mills; Matthew Richards; Jacob Whittle; Duncan Scott; Tom Dean (heats) | 4 × 100 m freestyle relay | 3:12.69 | 6 Q | —N/a | | 3:10.73 | 4 |
| Matt Richards; James Guy; Jack McMillan; Duncan Scott; Evan Jones (heats); Tom Dean (heats) | 4 × 200 m freestyle relay | 7:03.98 | 1 Q | —N/a | | 6:59.84 | 1st place, gold medalist(s) |
| Oliver Morgan (52.74); Greg Butler (59.11); Edward Mildred (51.08); Duncan Scott; Matt Richards (heats) | 4 × 100 m medley relay | 3:31.75 | 6 Q | —N/a | | 3:30.63 | 6 |

Women

| Athlete | Event | Heat | | Semi-final | | Final | |
| Athlete | Event | Time | Rank | Time | Rank | Time | Rank |
|---|---|---|---|---|---|---|---|
| Eva Okoro | 50 m freestyle | 24.81 | 15 Q | 24.55 | 11 | Did not advance | |
| Freya Anderson | 100 m freestyle | 54.39 | 17 Q | 54.49 | 16 | Did not advance | |
| Eva Okoro | 100 m freestyle | 54.55 | 21 | Did not advance | | | |
| Freya Colbert | 200 m freestyle | 1:57.53 | 8 Q | 1:55.91 | 6 Q | 1:55.06 | 4 |
| Leah Schlosshan | 200 m freestyle | 1:59.40 | 26 | Did not advance | | | |
| Lauren Cox | 50 m backstroke | 27.97; 27.64 | 16 S/off; 1 Q | 27.26 | 2 Q | 27.36 | 5 |
| Holly McGill | 200 m backstroke | 2:10.07 | 12 Q | 2:09.51 | 10 | Did not advance | |
| Katie Shanahan | 200 m backstroke | 2:09.96 | 10 WD | Did not advance | | | |
| Angharad Evans | 100 m breaststroke | 1:07.04 | 18 | Did not advance | | | |
| Angharad Evans | 200 m breaststroke | 2:24.82 | 4 Q | 2:23.32 | 4 Q | 2:24.21 | 5 |
| Keanna Macinnes | 100 m butterfly | 57.90 | 14 Q | 57.67 | 12 | Did not advance | |
| Keanna Macinnes | 200 m butterfly | 2:09.24 | 9 Q | 2:11.18 | 16 | Did not advance | |
| Emily Large | 200 m butterfly | 2:09.98 | 15 Q | 2:07.71 | 5 Q | 2:07.99 | 7 |
| Katie Shanahan | 200 m individual medley | 2:12.42 | 18 | Did not advance | | | |
| Abbie Wood | 200 m individual medley | 2:11.15 | 9 Q | 2:10.12 | 5 Q | 2:09.92 | 6 |
| Freya Colbert | 400 m individual medley | 4:38.31 | 8 Q | —N/a | | 4:40.21 | 8 |
| Abbie Wood | 400 m individual medley | 4:41.73 | 10 | —N/a | | Did not advance | |
| Freya Colbert; Freya Anderson; Abbie Wood; Leah Schlosshan; Lucy Hope (heats) | 4 × 200 m freestyle relay | 7:56.41 | 6 Q | —N/a | | 7:51.87 | 5 |
| Lauren Cox; Angharad Evans; Emily Richards; Freya Anderson | 4 × 100 m medley relay | 3:59.00 | 7 Q | —N/a | | 3:57.95 | 8 |

Mixed

| Athlete | Event | Heat | | Final | |
| Athlete | Event | Time | Rank | Time | Rank |
|---|---|---|---|---|---|
| Jacob Whittle; Jacob Mills; Freya Anderson; Eva Okaro | 4 × 100 m freestyle relay | 3:35.24 | 12 | Did not advance | |
| Katie Shanahan; Max Morgan; Edward Mildred; Freya Anderson | 4 × 100 m medley relay | 3:46.19 | 12 | Did not advance | |

== Water polo ==
Summary

| Team | Event | Group stage | | | | Playoff | 9th–12th place semifinals | Eleventh place game | |
| Team | Event | Opposition Score | Opposition Score | Opposition Score | Rank | Opposition Score | Opposition Score | Opposition Score | Rank |
|---|---|---|---|---|---|---|---|---|---|
| Great Britain | Women's tournament | France; W 12–9 | South Africa; W 12–3 | Spain; L 7–16 | 2 Q | Japan; L 10–23 | New Zealand; L 12–20 | France; W 14–9 | 11th |

=== Women's tournament ===
Team roster

The following is the Britain roster.

Head coach: Jo Mountfield / Theo Nousios

- 1 Sophie Jackson GK
- 2 Anya Clapperton FP
- 3 Amélie Perkins FP
- 4 Cecily Turner FP
- 5 Toula Falvey FP
- 6 Katie Brown FP
- 7 Katy Cutler FP
- 8 Brooke Tafazolli FP
- 9 Katherine Rogers FP
- 10 Amelia Peters FP
- 11 Lucy Blenkinship FP
- 12 Izzy Howe FP
- 13 Cassidy Ball GK
- 14 Harriet Dickens FP

Group play

| Pos | Team | Pld | W | PSW | PSL | L | GF | GA | GD | Pts | Qualification |
|---|---|---|---|---|---|---|---|---|---|---|---|
| 1 | Spain | 3 | 3 | 0 | 0 | 0 | 62 | 17 | +45 | 9 | Quarterfinals |
| 2 | Great Britain | 3 | 2 | 0 | 0 | 1 | 31 | 28 | +3 | 6 | Playoffs |
| 3 | France | 3 | 1 | 0 | 0 | 2 | 28 | 41 | −13 | 3 | Playoffs |
| 4 | South Africa | 3 | 0 | 0 | 0 | 3 | 13 | 48 | −35 | 0 | 13–16th place semifinals |

Source: Omegatiming
Rules for classification: 1) points; 2) head-to-head points; 3) head-to-head goal difference; 4) head-to-head number of goals scored; 5) Goal difference.

| 11 July 2025; 13:45 | Report | France | 9–12 | Great Britain | OCBC Aquatic Centre, Singapore; Referees: Alessia Ferrari (ITA), Megan Rose Perry (NZL) |
| 11 July 2025; 13:45 | Report | Score by quarters: 4–3, 0–3, 2–5, 3–1 | | | OCBC Aquatic Centre, Singapore; Referees: Alessia Ferrari (ITA), Megan Rose Perry (NZL) |
| 11 July 2025; 13:45 | Report | Vernoux 4 | Goals | Brown, Turner 3 | OCBC Aquatic Centre, Singapore; Referees: Alessia Ferrari (ITA), Megan Rose Perry (NZL) |

| 13 July 2025; 12:10 | Report | Great Britain | 12–3 | South Africa | OCBC Aquatic Centre, Singapore; Referees: Zhang Liang (CHN), Wu Zhekang (SGP) |
| 13 July 2025; 12:10 | Report | Score by quarters: 5–0, 2–2, 4–1, 1–0 | | | OCBC Aquatic Centre, Singapore; Referees: Zhang Liang (CHN), Wu Zhekang (SGP) |
| 13 July 2025; 12:10 | Report | Turner 4 | Goals | three players 1 | OCBC Aquatic Centre, Singapore; Referees: Zhang Liang (CHN), Wu Zhekang (SGP) |

| 15 July 2025; 13:45 | Report | Great Britain | 7–16 | Spain | OCBC Aquatic Centre, Singapore; Referees: Marcella Braga (BRA), Alessia Ferrari (ITA) |
| 15 July 2025; 13:45 | Report | Score by quarters: 0–4, 1–3, 5–3, 1–6 | | | OCBC Aquatic Centre, Singapore; Referees: Marcella Braga (BRA), Alessia Ferrari (ITA) |
| 15 July 2025; 13:45 | Report | three players 3 | Goals | Ruiz 3 | OCBC Aquatic Centre, Singapore; Referees: Marcella Braga (BRA), Alessia Ferrari (ITA) |

Playoffs

| 17 July 2025; 20:45 | Report | Japan | 23–10 | Great Britain | OCBC Aquatic Centre, Singapore; Referees: Aurély Blanchard (FRA), Fiona Haigh (AUS) |
| 17 July 2025; 20:45 | Report | Score by quarters: 6–2, 5–2, 5–1, 7–5 | | | OCBC Aquatic Centre, Singapore; Referees: Aurély Blanchard (FRA), Fiona Haigh (AUS) |
| 17 July 2025; 20:45 | Report | Ura 4 | Goals | five players 2 | OCBC Aquatic Centre, Singapore; Referees: Aurély Blanchard (FRA), Fiona Haigh (AUS) |

9–12th place semifinals

| 19 July 2025; 13:45 | Report | New Zealand | 20–12 | Great Britain | OCBC Aquatic Centre, Singapore; Referees: Tamás Kovács-Csatlós (HUN), Marcella Braga (BRA) |
| 19 July 2025; 13:45 | Report | Score by quarters: 5–3, 7–3, 5–1, 3–5 | | | OCBC Aquatic Centre, Singapore; Referees: Tamás Kovács-Csatlós (HUN), Marcella Braga (BRA) |
| 19 July 2025; 13:45 | Report | Quin 5 | Goals | Turner 4 | OCBC Aquatic Centre, Singapore; Referees: Tamás Kovács-Csatlós (HUN), Marcella Braga (BRA) |

Eleventh place game

| 21 July 2025; 09:00 | Report | France | 9–14 | Great Britain | OCBC Aquatic Centre, Singapore; Referees: Stanko Ivanovski (MNE), Fiona Haigh (AUS) |
| 21 July 2025; 09:00 | Report | Score by quarters: 1–2, 3–4, 2–4, 3–4 | | | OCBC Aquatic Centre, Singapore; Referees: Stanko Ivanovski (MNE), Fiona Haigh (AUS) |
| 21 July 2025; 09:00 | Report | Vernoux 3 | Goals | Rogers, Turner 3 | OCBC Aquatic Centre, Singapore; Referees: Stanko Ivanovski (MNE), Fiona Haigh (AUS) |
