= Diving at the 2023 World Aquatics Championships – Women's 1 metre springboard =

Women's 1 metre springboard at the 2023 World Aquatics Championships
- Venue: Fukuoka Prefectural Pool
- Location: Fukuoka, Japan
- Dates: 14 July (preliminary); 15 July (final)
- Competitors: 44 from 29 nations
- Winning points: 318.60

Medalists
gold medal	Lin Shan	China
silver medal	Li Yajie	China
bronze medal	Aranza Vázquez	Mexico

The women's 1 metre springboard competition at the 2023 World Aquatics Championships was held on 14 and 15 July 2023.

== Results ==
The preliminary round was started on 14 July at 10:00. The final was held on 15 July at 15:30.

Green denotes finalists

Rank	Diver	Nationality	Preliminary		Final	
Rank	Diver	Nationality	Points	Rank	Points	Rank
1st place, gold medalist(s)	Lin Shan	China	291.25	1	318.60	1
2nd place, silver medalist(s)	Li Yajie	China	283.35	2	306.35	2
3rd place, bronze medalist(s)	Aranza Vázquez	Mexico	262.20	3	285.05	3
4	Pamela Ware	Canada	237.35	12	284.40	4
5	Maha Eissa	Egypt	237.60	11	264.55	5
6	Chiara Pellacani	Italy	243.45	5	260.85	6
7	Hailey Hernandez	United States	239.40	10	259.20	7
8	Michelle Heimberg	Switzerland	251.90	4	258.35	8
9	Georgia Sheehan	Australia	242.25	6	256.75	9
10	Jette Müller	Germany	242.00	8	248.25	10
11	Julia Vincent	South Africa	242.25	6	227.05	11
12	Elena Bertocchi	Italy	239.55	9	215.10	12
13	Elizabeth Roussel	New Zealand	235.65	13	Did not advance	
14	Kim Na-hyun	South Korea	234.40	14	Did not advance	
15	Mia Vallée	Canada	232.15	15	Did not advance	
16	Joslyn Oakley	United States	231.95	16	Did not advance	
17	Clare Cryan	Ireland	229.50	17	Did not advance	
18	Kaja Skrzek	Poland	229.45	18	Did not advance	
19	Kim Su-ji	South Korea	229.40	19	Did not advance	
20	Lauren Hallaselkä	Finland	227.50	20	Did not advance	
21	Elna Widerström	Sweden	227.00	21	Did not advance	
22	Gladies Lariesa Garina Haga	Indonesia	226.55	22	Did not advance	
23	Anna Santos	Brazil	226.45	23	Did not advance	
24	Anisley García	Cuba	226.30	24	Did not advance	
25	Naïs Gillet	France	225.15	25	Did not advance	
26	Luana Lira	Brazil	224.35	26	Did not advance	
27	Brittany O'Brien	Australia	221.45	27	Did not advance	
28	Džeja Patrika	Latvia	218.90	28	Did not advance	
29	Caroline Kupka	Norway	217.00	29	Did not advance	
30	Helle Tuxen	Norway	214.95	30	Did not advance	
31	Paola Pineda	Mexico	214.25	31	Did not advance	
32	Elizabeth Pérez	Venezuela	213.10	32	Did not advance	
33	Lena Hentschel	Germany	212.00	33	Did not advance	
34	Daniela Zapata	Colombia	210.70	34	Did not advance	
35	Ong Ker Ying	Malaysia	204.30	35	Did not advance	
36	Bailey Heydra	South Africa	202.00	36	Did not advance	
37	Emilia Nilsson Garip	Sweden	199.95	37	Did not advance	
38	Ana Ricci	Peru	199.35	38	Did not advance	
39	Amelie Foerster	Romania	190.85	39	Did not advance	
40	Rocío Velázquez	Spain	189.40	40	Did not advance	
41	Estilla Mosena	Hungary	186.90	41	Did not advance	
42	Patrícia Kun	Hungary	182.40	42	Did not advance	
43	Prisis Ruiz	Cuba	181.15	43	Did not advance	
44	Kimberly Bong	Malaysia	178.40	44	Did not advance	
