= Somalia at the 2025 World Aquatics Championships =

- Flag of Somalia
- World Aquatics code: SOM

in Singapore
- Competitors: 1 in 1 sport
- Medals: Gold 0 Silver 0 Bronze 0 Total 0

World Aquatics Championships appearances
- 2025

Somalia competed at the 2025 World Aquatics Championships in Singapore from 11 July to 3 August 2025.

== Competitors ==
The following is the list of competitors in the Championships.

Sport	Men	Women	Total
Swimming	1	0	1
Total	1	0	1

== Swimming ==
Men

Athlete	Event	Heat		Semifinal		Final	
Athlete	Event	Time	Rank	Time	Rank	Time	Rank
Mustafa Hashim	100 m freestyle	1:05.01	104	Did not advance			
Mustafa Hashim	100 m breaststroke	1:16.69	72	Did not advance			
