= Singapore at the 2025 World Aquatics Championships =

- Flag of Singapore
- World Aquatics code: SGP
- National federation: Singapore Swimming Federation
- Website: singaporeswimming.org

in Singapore
- Competitors: 71 in 5 sports
- Medals: Gold 0 Silver 0 Bronze 0 Total 0

World Aquatics Championships appearances
- 1973; 1975; 1978; 1982; 1986; 1991; 1994; 1998; 2001; 2003; 2005; 2007; 2009; 2011; 2013; 2015; 2017; 2019; 2022; 2023; 2024; 2025

Singapore competed at the 2025 World Aquatics Championships in Singapore from 11 July to 3 August 2025. They were also the host country of the championships.

Singapore sent its largest contingent of athletes, 72, to the Championships.

== Competitors ==
The following is the list of competitors in the Championships.

== Athletes by discipline ==
The following is the number of competitors who will participate at the Championships per discipline.

Sport	Men	Women	Total
Artistic swimming	0	9	9
Diving	4	5	9
Open water swimming	5	3	8
Swimming	9	7	16
Water polo	15	14	29
Total	33	38	71

== Artistic swimming ==
Mixed

Athlete	Event	Preliminaries		Final	
Athlete	Event	Points	Rank	Points	Rank
Yvette Ann Chong; Rachel Ho; Kiera Lee; Rae-Anne Ong; Debbie Soh; Caitlyn Anne Tan; Claire Tan; Rachel Thean; Rhea Thean	Team acrobatic routine	137.0708	22	Did not advance	
Yvette Ann Chong; Rachel Ho; Kiera Lee; Rae-Anne Ong; Debbie Soh; Caitlyn Anne Tan; Claire Tan; Rachel Thean; Rhea Thean	Team technical routine	200.6333	23	Did not advance	

Women

Athlete	Event	Preliminaries		Final	
Athlete	Event	Points	Rank	Points	Rank
Rachel Thean	Solo technical routine	215.9750	20	Did not advance	
Rachel Thean	Solo free routine	201.2638	16	Did not advance	
Yvette Ann Chong; Debbie Soh	Duet technical routine	243.6826	17	Did not advance	
Yvette Ann Chong; Debbie Soh	Duet free routine	222.6152	14	Did not advance	

== Diving ==
Men

Athlete	Event	Preliminaries		Semi-finals		Final	
Athlete	Event	Points	Rank	Points	Rank	Points	Rank
Shen Oon Max Lee	1 m springboard	261.00	48	—N/a		Did not advance	
Shen Oon Max Lee	3 m springboard	326.25	44	Did not advance			
Shen Oon Max Lee	10 m platform	330.85	35	Did not advance			
Avvir Tham	1 m springboard	314.65	28	—N/a		Did not advance	
Avvir Tham	3 m springboard	363.90	22	Did not advance			
Shen Oon Max Lee; Ayden Ng	3 m synchronized springboard	302.10	22	—N/a		Did not advance	
Shen Oon Max Lee; Ayden Ng	10 m synchronized platform	300.09	18	—N/a		Did not advance	

Women

Athlete	Event	Preliminaries		Semi-finals		Final	
Athlete	Event	Points	Rank	Points	Rank	Points	Rank
Fong Kay Yian	1 m springboard	184.35	45	—N/a		Did not advance	
Fong Kay Yian	3 m springboard	193.25	46	Did not advance			
Ainslee Kwang	10 m platform	285.00	13 Q	242.35	17	Did not advance	
Clara Liaw	3 m springboard	210.60	40	Did not advance			
Ashlee Yi Xuan Tan	1 m springboard	196.85	40	—N/a		Did not advance	
Clara Liaw; Alycia Lim	3 m synchronized springboard	211.83	15	—N/a		Did not advance	

Mixed

Athlete	Event	Final	
Athlete	Event	Points	Rank
Ashlee Yi Xuan Tan; Shen Oon Max Lee	3 m synchronized springboard	233.91	12
Ainslee Kwang; Shek Yen Yim	10 m synchronized platform	238.62	12
Ainslee Kwang; Ashlee Yi Xuan Tan; Shen Oon Max Lee; Avvir Tham	Team event	224.05	20

== Open water swimming ==
Men

Athlete	Event	Heats		Semifinal		Final	
Athlete	Event	Time	Rank	Time	Rank	Time	Rank
Artyom Lukasevits	Men's 3 km knockout sprints	17:50.0	17	Did not advance			
Luke Yu Yang Tan	Men's 3 km knockout sprints	18:53.3	25	Did not advance			
Wei Sheng Ian Leong	Men's 5 km	—N/a				1:11:34.8	74
Luke Yu Yang Tan	Men's 5 km	—N/a				1:07:26.9	68
Artyom Lukasevits	Men's 10 km	—N/a				2:11:41.4	43
Ritchie Oh	Men's 10 km	—N/a				DNF	

Women

Athlete	Event	Heats		Semifinal		Final	
Athlete	Event	Time	Rank	Time	Rank	Time	Rank
Li-Shan Chantal Liew	Women's 3 km knockout sprints	18:42.0	15	Did not advance			
Kate Ona	Women's 3 km knockout sprints	20:01.5	22	Did not advance			
Muse Goh	Women's 5 km	—N/a				1:13:57.4	60
Kate Ona	Women's 5 km	—N/a				1:09:53.9	43
Li-Shan Chantal Liew	Women's 10 km	—N/a				2:22:07.9	40
Kate Ona	Women's 10 km	—N/a				2:29:18.0	45

Mixed

Athlete	Event	Time	Rank
Li-Shan Chantal Liew; Artyom Lukasevits; Kate Ona; Russel Pang	Team relay	1:15:39.0	14

== Swimming ==
Men

Athlete	Event	Heat		Semi-final		Final	
Athlete	Event	Time	Rank	Time	Rank	Time	Rank
Chan Chun Ho	50 m breaststroke	28.16	45	Did not advance			
Chan Chun Ho	100 m breaststroke	1:02.00	41	Did not advance			
Chan Chun Ho	200 m breaststroke	2:16.17	30	Did not advance			
Mikkel Lee	50 m freestyle	22.18	29	Did not advance			
Glen Lim	400 m freestyle	3:54.97	32	—N/a		Did not advance	
Quah Zheng Wen	50 m backstroke	25.38	37	Did not advance			
Quah Zheng Wen	100 m backstroke	54.39	29	Did not advance			
Quah Zheng Wen	200 m backstroke	2:00.58	31	Did not advance			
Quah Zheng Wen	100 m butterfly	51.92	24	Did not advance			
Jonathan Tan	100 m freestyle	49.62	38	Did not advance			
Jonathan Tan	200 m freestyle	1:50.56	40	Did not advance			
Zackery Tay	200 m individual medley	2:03.55	33	Did not advance			
Zackery Tay	400 m individual medley	4:26.71	26	—N/a		Did not advance	
Teong Tzen Wei	50 m butterfly	23.38	22	Did not advance			
Ardi Azman; Mikkel Lee; Jonathan Tan; Glen Lim	4 × 100 m freestyle relay	3:18.38	18	—N/a		Did not advance	
Glen Lim; Jonathan Tan; Ardi Azman; Jerald Lium	4 × 200 m freestyle relay	7:23.00	15	—N/a		Did not advance	
Zackery Tay; Chan Chun Ho; Jonathan Tan; Mikkel Lee	4 × 100 m medley relay	3:41.17	23	—N/a		Did not advance	

Women

Athlete	Event	Heat		Semi-final		Final	
Athlete	Event	Time	Rank	Time	Rank	Time	Rank
Gan Ching Hwee	200 m freestyle	Did not start		Did not advance			
Gan Ching Hwee	400 m freestyle	4:09.81 NR	13	—N/a		Did not advance	
Gan Ching Hwee	800 m freestyle	8:31.36	13	—N/a		Did not advance	
Gan Ching Hwee	1500 m freestyle	16:01.29 NR	4 Q	—N/a		16:03.51	7
Amanda Lim	50 m freestyle	25.53	29	Did not advance			
Quah Ting Wen	100 m freestyle	56.44	36	Did not advance			
Quah Ting Wen	50 m butterfly	26.69	30	Did not advance			
Quah Jing Wen	100 m butterfly	59.18	24	Did not advance			
Quah Jing Wen	200 m butterfly	2:13.50	21	Did not advance			
Letita Sim	50 m breaststroke	31.12	24	Did not advance			
Letita Sim	100 m breaststroke	1:07.25	23	Did not advance			
Letita Sim	200 m breaststroke	2:27.91	22	Did not advance			
Letita Sim	200 m individual medley	2:15.09	27	Did not advance			
Levenia Sim	50 m backstroke	29.40	36	Did not advance			
Levenia Sim	100 m backstroke	1:02.80	34	Did not advance			
Levenia Sim; Letitia Sim; Quah Jing Wen; Quah Ting Wen	4 × 100 m medley relay	4:06.72	19	—N/a		Did not advance	

Mixed

Athlete	Event	Heat		Final	
Athlete	Event	Time	Rank	Time	Rank
Zackery Tay; Chan Chun Ho; Megan Yo; Quah Ting Wen	4 × 100 m medley relay	3:56.51	21	Did not advance	

== Water polo ==
Summary

Team	Event	Group stage				Playoff	Quarterfinal	Semi-final	Final / BM	
Team	Event	Opposition Score	Opposition Score	Opposition Score	Rank	Opposition Score	Opposition Score	Opposition Score	Opposition Score	Rank
Singapore	Men's tournament	Brazil; L 8–19	Canada; L 10–22	United States; L 6–26	4	—N/a	—N/a	13th–16th place semifinal China; L 8–21	15th-16th place final South Africa; W 14–13	15
Singapore	Women's tournament	Australia; L 2–34	New Zealand; L 22–7	Italy; L 32–5	4	—N/a	—N/a	13th–16th place semifinal Argentina; L 9–18	15th-16th place final South Africa; L 4–8	16

=== Men's tournament ===
Team roster

The following is the Singaporean roster.

Head coach: Kan Aoyagi

- 1 Chou Ken GK
- 2 Loh Zhi Zhi FP
- 3 Fong Wai Chun FP
- 4 Goh Wen Zhe FP
- 5 Loh de Jun Cayde FP
- 6 Yap Dong Xuan Ryan FP
- 7 Chan Dominic Bo Xun FP
- 8 Lok Shaunn Blasius Jun Jie FP
- 9 Sanjiv Rajandra FP
- 10 Sajk Justin Kin Yan FP
- 11 See Tien Ee Jayden FP
- 12 Koh Jian Ying FP
- 13 Lee Lee Kai Yang GK
- 14 Matthias Goh FP
- 15 Lee Darren Jit An GK

Group play

Pos	Team	Pld	W	PSW	PSL	L	GF	GA	GD	Pts	Qualification
1	United States	3	3	0	0	0	60	22	+38	9	Quarterfinals
2	Brazil	3	1	1	0	1	37	35	+2	5	Playoffs
3	Canada	3	1	0	1	1	42	39	+3	4	Playoffs
4	Singapore (H)	3	0	0	0	3	24	67	−43	0	13–16th place semifinals

Source: Omegatiming
Rules for classification: 1) points; 2) head-to-head points; 3) head-to-head goal difference; 4) head-to-head number of goals scored; 5) Goal difference.
(H) Host

12 July 2025; 13:45	Report	Brazil	19–8	Singapore	OCBC Aquatic Centre, Singapore; Referees: Alessia Ferrari (ITA), Chisato Kurosaki (JPN)
12 July 2025; 13:45	Report	Score by quarters: 4–0, 5–1, 6–3, 4–4			OCBC Aquatic Centre, Singapore; Referees: Alessia Ferrari (ITA), Chisato Kurosaki (JPN)
12 July 2025; 13:45	Report	three players 3	Goals	Rajandra 3	OCBC Aquatic Centre, Singapore; Referees: Alessia Ferrari (ITA), Chisato Kurosaki (JPN)

14 July 2025; 19:10	Report	Singapore	10–22	Canada	OCBC Aquatic Centre, Singapore; Referees: Tamás Kovács (HUN), Mihai Balanescu (ROU)
14 July 2025; 19:10	Report	Score by quarters: 5–7, 2–5, 2–4, 1–6			OCBC Aquatic Centre, Singapore; Referees: Tamás Kovács (HUN), Mihai Balanescu (ROU)
14 July 2025; 19:10	Report	Goh 4	Goals	D'Souza 7	OCBC Aquatic Centre, Singapore; Referees: Tamás Kovács (HUN), Mihai Balanescu (ROU)

16 July 2025; 19:10	Report	Singapore	6–26	United States	OCBC Aquatic Centre, Singapore; Referees: Ivan Raković (SRB), Yasser Mehalhel (EGY)
16 July 2025; 19:10	Report	Score by quarters: 0–4, 2–4, 2–10, 2–8			OCBC Aquatic Centre, Singapore; Referees: Ivan Raković (SRB), Yasser Mehalhel (EGY)
16 July 2025; 19:10	Report	See 2	Goals	R. Dodd, Irving 4	OCBC Aquatic Centre, Singapore; Referees: Ivan Raković (SRB), Yasser Mehalhel (EGY)

13th–16th place semifinals

18 July 2025; 10:35	Report	Singapore	8–21	China	OCBC Aquatic Centre, Singapore; Referees: Mihai Balanescu (ROU), Evan Andrews (CAN)
18 July 2025; 10:35	Report	Score by quarters: 1–6, 3–6, 1–5, 3–4			OCBC Aquatic Centre, Singapore; Referees: Mihai Balanescu (ROU), Evan Andrews (CAN)
18 July 2025; 10:35	Report	Lok 2	Goals	Chen Z. 6	OCBC Aquatic Centre, Singapore; Referees: Mihai Balanescu (ROU), Evan Andrews (CAN)

15th place game

20 July 2025; 09:00	Report	South Africa	13–14	Singapore	OCBC Aquatic Centre, Singapore; Referees: Maxim Gerasimov (GBR), Mihai Balanescu (ROU)
20 July 2025; 09:00	Report	Score by quarters: 2–7, 4–3, 3–3, 4–1			OCBC Aquatic Centre, Singapore; Referees: Maxim Gerasimov (GBR), Mihai Balanescu (ROU)
20 July 2025; 09:00	Report	Sneddon 3	Goals	Goh 3	OCBC Aquatic Centre, Singapore; Referees: Maxim Gerasimov (GBR), Mihai Balanescu (ROU)

=== Women's tournament ===
Team roster

The following is the Singaporean roster.

Head coach: Yu Lei

- 1 Rochelle Ong GK
- 2 Charlene Tio FP
- 3 Loh Yu Xuan FP
- 4 Yap Jingxuan FP
- 5 Koh Ting Ting FP
- 6 Nicole Lim FP
- 7 Abielle Yeo FP
- 8 Heather Lee FP
- 9 Kayla Yeo FP
- 10 Ong Cheng Jing FP
- 11 Wan Celeste FP
- 12 Ariel Charis Lim FP
- 13 Mounisha Devi GK
- 14 Koh Xiao Li FP

Group play

Pos	Team	Pld	W	PSW	PSL	L	GF	GA	GD	Pts	Qualification
1	Australia	3	3	0	0	0	68	23	+45	9	Quarterfinals
2	Italy	3	2	0	0	1	61	33	+28	6	Playoffs
3	New Zealand	3	1	0	0	2	37	36	+1	3	Playoffs
4	Singapore (H)	3	0	0	0	3	14	88	−74	0	13–16th place semifinals

Source: Omegatiming
Rules for classification: 1) points; 2) head-to-head points; 3) head-to-head goal difference; 4) head-to-head number of goals scored; 5) Goal difference.
(H) Host

11 July 2025; 19:10	Report	Singapore	2–34	Australia	OCBC Aquatic Centre, Singapore; Referees: Marcella Braga (BRA), Boris Margeta (SLO)
11 July 2025; 19:10	Report	Score by quarters: 0–7, 1–8, 1–10, 0–9			OCBC Aquatic Centre, Singapore; Referees: Marcella Braga (BRA), Boris Margeta (SLO)
11 July 2025; 19:10	Report	Lee, Ong C. 1	Goals	Williams 5	OCBC Aquatic Centre, Singapore; Referees: Marcella Braga (BRA), Boris Margeta (SLO)

13 July 2025; 19:10	Report	New Zealand	22–7	Singapore	OCBC Aquatic Centre, Singapore; Referees: Maxim Gerasimov (GBR), Evan Andrews (CAN)
13 July 2025; 19:10	Report	Score by quarters: 8–2, 5–1, 3–2, 6–2			OCBC Aquatic Centre, Singapore; Referees: Maxim Gerasimov (GBR), Evan Andrews (CAN)
13 July 2025; 19:10	Report	McDowall 8	Goals	Tio 4	OCBC Aquatic Centre, Singapore; Referees: Maxim Gerasimov (GBR), Evan Andrews (CAN)

15 July 2025; 19:10	Report	Italy	32–5	Singapore	OCBC Aquatic Centre, Singapore; Referees: Chisato Kurosaki (JPN), Maxim Gerasimov (GBR)
15 July 2025; 19:10	Report	Score by quarters: 8–0, 8–1, 6–1, 10–3			OCBC Aquatic Centre, Singapore; Referees: Chisato Kurosaki (JPN), Maxim Gerasimov (GBR)
15 July 2025; 19:10	Report	Cocchiere 6	Goals	Lee 2	OCBC Aquatic Centre, Singapore; Referees: Chisato Kurosaki (JPN), Maxim Gerasimov (GBR)

13th–16th place semifinals

17 July 2025; 09:00	Report	Singapore	9–18	Argentina	OCBC Aquatic Centre, Singapore; Referees: Megan Perry (NZL), Michiel Zwart (NED)
17 July 2025; 09:00	Report	Score by quarters: 2–4, 1–6, 3–4, 3–4			OCBC Aquatic Centre, Singapore; Referees: Megan Perry (NZL), Michiel Zwart (NED)
17 July 2025; 09:00	Report	Koh 3	Goals	Canda 5	OCBC Aquatic Centre, Singapore; Referees: Megan Perry (NZL), Michiel Zwart (NED)

15th place game

19 July 2025; 09:00	Report	Singapore	4–8	South Africa	OCBC Aquatic Centre, Singapore; Referees: Aurély Blanchard (FRA), Andrej Franulović (CRO)
19 July 2025; 09:00	Report	Score by quarters: 0–3, 3–2, 1–2, 0–1			OCBC Aquatic Centre, Singapore; Referees: Aurély Blanchard (FRA), Andrej Franulović (CRO)
19 July 2025; 09:00	Report	four players 1	Goals	Williams 2	OCBC Aquatic Centre, Singapore; Referees: Aurély Blanchard (FRA), Andrej Franulović (CRO)
