= Sweden at the 2023 World Aquatics Championships =

- Flag of Sweden
- World Aquatics code: SWE
- National federation: Swedish Swimming Federation
- Website: svensksimidrott.se (in Swedish)

in Fukuoka, Japan
- Competitors: 19 in 3 sports
- Medals Ranked 13th: Gold 2 Silver 0 Bronze 0 Total 2

World Aquatics Championships appearances (overview)
- 1973; 1975; 1978; 1982; 1986; 1991; 1994; 1998; 2001; 2003; 2005; 2007; 2009; 2011; 2013; 2015; 2017; 2019; 2022; 2023; 2024; 2025

Sweden is set to compete at the 2023 World Aquatics Championships in Fukuoka, Japan from 14 to 30 July.

== Medalists ==
Medal	Name	Sport	Event	Date
Gold	Sarah Sjöström	Swimming	Women's 50 m butterfly	July 29
Gold	Sarah Sjöström	Swimming	Women's 50 m freestyle	July 30

== Athletes by discipline ==
The following is the list of number of competitors participating at the Championships per discipline.

Sport	Men	Women	Total
Artistic swimming	0	2	2
Diving	2	2	4
Swimming	6	7	13
Total	8	11	19

== Artistic swimming ==
Sweden entered 2 artistic swimmers.

Women

Athlete	Event	Preliminaries		Final	
Athlete	Event	Points	Rank	Points	Rank
Marfa Chragina	Solo technical routine	148.3234	28	Did not advance	
Sandra Freund	Solo free routine	144.1728	14	Did not advance	

== Diving ==
Sweden entered 4 divers.

Men

Athlete	Event	Preliminaries		Semifinal		Final	
Athlete	Event	Points	Rank	Points	Rank	Points	Rank
David Ekdahl	1 m springboard	282.20	42	—N/a		Did not advance	
David Ekdahl	3 m springboard	325.05	44	Did not advance			
Elias Petersen	1 m springboard	291.20	35	—N/a		Did not advance	
Elias Petersen	3 m springboard	285.50	53	Did not advance			

Women

Athlete	Event	Preliminaries		Semifinal		Final	
Athlete	Event	Points	Rank	Points	Rank	Points	Rank
Emilia Nilsson Garip	1 m springboard	199.95	37	—N/a		Did not advance	
Emilia Nilsson Garip	3 m springboard	289.80	8 Q	308.15	7 Q	302.00	8
Elna Widerström	1 m springboard	227.00	21	—N/a		Did not advance	
Elna Widerström	3 m springboard	270.90	23	Did not advance			
Emilia Nilsson Garip; Elna Widerström	3 m synchro springboard	257.82	11 Q	—N/a		258.90	11

Mixed

Athlete	Event	Final	
Athlete	Event	Points	Rank
Elias Petersen; Emilia Nilsson Garip	3 m synchro springboard	276.60	5

== Swimming ==
Sweden entered 16 swimmers.

Men

Athlete	Event	Heat		Semifinal		Final	
Athlete	Event	Time	Rank	Time	Rank	Time	Rank
Robin Hanson	200 metre freestyle	1:47.09	22	Did not advance			
Oskar Hoff	50 metre butterfly	23.74	32	Did not advance			
Oskar Hoff	100 metre butterfly	53.97	45	Did not advance			
Erik Persson	100 metre breaststroke	1:01.03	26	Did not advance			
Erik Persson	200 metre breaststroke	2:10.51	11 Q	2:09.89	9	Did not advance	
Björn Seeliger	50 metre freestyle	22.30	31	Did not advance			
Björn Seeliger	100 metre freestyle	48.82	30	Did not advance			
Björn Seeliger	50 metre backstroke	25.38	25	Did not advance			
Björn Seeliger; Robin Hanson; Elias Funch Persson; Isak Eliasson	4 × 100 m freestyle relay	3:16.07	16	—N/a		Did not advance	
Björn Seeliger; Erik Persson; Oskar Hoff; Robin Hanson	4 × 100 m medley relay	3:39.57	19	—N/a		Did not advance	

Women

Athlete	Event	Heat		Semifinal		Final	
Athlete	Event	Time	Rank	Time	Rank	Time	Rank
Sofia Åstedt	200 metre freestyle	2:02.57	41	Did not advance			
Michelle Coleman	50 metre freestyle	24.51	5 Q	24.63	6 Q	24.46	7
Michelle Coleman	100 metre freestyle	53.72	5 Q	53.41	7 Q	53.83	7
Louise Hansson	50 metre backstroke	28.42	22	Did not advance			
Louise Hansson	100 metre butterfly	57.49	4 Q	57.29	9	Did not advance	
Sophie Hansson	50 metre breaststroke	30.39	8 Q	30.40	9	Did not advance	
Sophie Hansson	100 metre breaststroke	1:06.69	12 Q	1:06.19	6 Q	1:06.61	7
Sophie Hansson	200 metre breaststroke	2:26.01	12 Q	2:25.63	13	Did not advance	
Sara Junevik	50 metre butterfly	26.04	11 Q	25.77	8 Q	25.74	6
Hanna Rosvall	100 metre backstroke	1:00.46	15 Q	1:00.65	15	Did not advance	
Hanna Rosvall	200 metre backstroke	Did not start					
Sarah Sjöström	50 metre freestyle	23.93	1 Q	23.61 NR	1 Q	23.62	1st place, gold medalist(s)
Sarah Sjöström	50 metre butterfly	25.04	1 Q	24.74	1 Q	24.77	1st place, gold medalist(s)
Sarah Sjöström; Michelle Coleman; Sara Junevik; Louise Hansson; Sofia Åstedt	4 × 100 m freestyle relay	3:36.29	6 Q	—N/a		3:34.17	5
Michelle Coleman; Sophie Hansson; Louise Hansson; Sarah Sjöström	4 × 100 m medley relay	3:57.49	3 Q	—N/a		3:56.32	5

Mixed

Athlete	Event	Heat		Final	
Athlete	Event	Time	Rank	Time	Rank
Robin Hanson; Björn Seeliger; Louise Hansson; Sofia Åstedt	4 × 100 m freestyle relay	3:27.64	11	Did not advance	
Hanna Rosvall; Erik Persson; Louise Hansson; Björn Seeliger	4 × 100 m medley relay	3:45.85	9	Did not advance	
