= Lin Shan (diver) =

Chinese diver (born 2001)

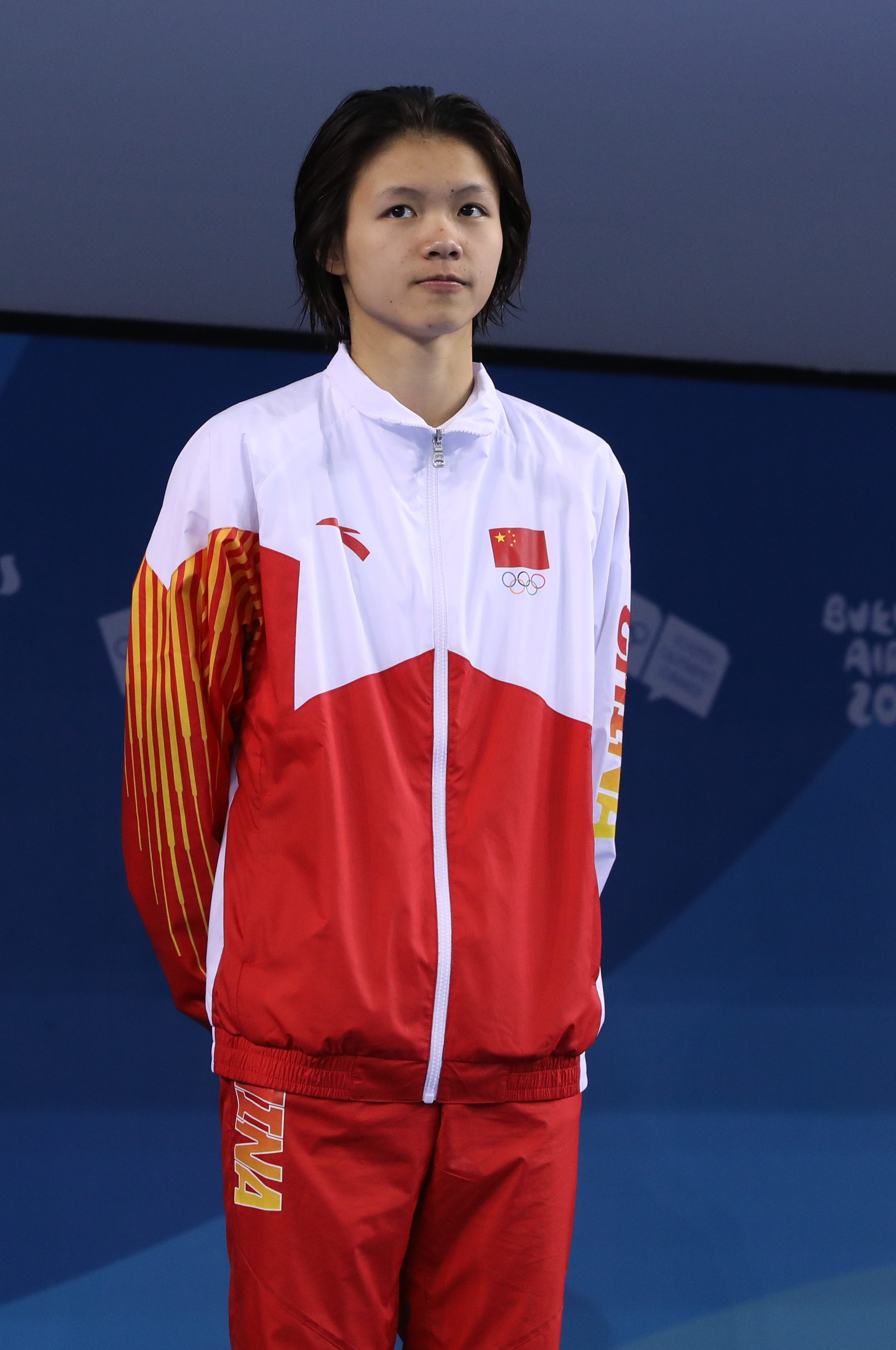

Personal information
- Nationality: Chinese
- Born: 3 August 2001 (age 25) Guangxi, China
- Height: 1.65 m (5 ft 5 in)
- Weight: 45 kg (99 lb)

Sport
- Country: China
- Sport: Diving
Medal record
Representing China
World Championships
Gold medal – first place	2019 Gwangju	Mixed team
Gold medal – first place	2022 Budapest	3 m mixed synchro
Gold medal – first place	2023 Fukuoka	1 m springboard
Gold medal – first place	2023 Fukuoka	3 m mixed synchro
Asian Games
Gold medal – first place	2026 Aichi–Nagoya	1 m springboard
Silver medal – second place	2022 Hangzhou	1 m springboard
Youth Olympic Games
Gold medal – first place	2018 Buenos Aires	3 m springboard
Gold medal – first place	2018 Buenos Aires	10 m platform
Representing Mixed-NOCs team
Youth Olympic Games
Gold medal – first place	2018 Buenos Aires	Mixed team

Lin Shan (Chinese: 林珊; pinyin: Lín Shān; born 3 August 2001) is a Chinese diver.

She participated at the 2019 World Aquatics Championships, winning a medal.

== Career ==
Lin Shan was selected by the coach of the Guangdong Provincial Diving Team when she was 9 years old.

On May 9, 2016, the 2016 National Diving Championship and Rio Olympic Trials were held in Nanning, Guangxi. In the women's synchronized 10-meter platform final, Lin Shan/Chen Guirong of the Guangdong Haiyinji team won second place with a total score of 312.36 points.

In 2017, she entered the national team training.

On March 11, 2018, Lin Shan/Lian Junjie won the men's and women's mixed 10-meter platform final in the FINA Diving Series Beijing Station with a total score of 349.56 points. On March 16, in the men's and women's mixed 10-meter platform final at the FINA Diving Series in Fuji Station, Japan, Lin Shan/Lian Junjie won the championship with a total score of 355.74 points, achieving two consecutive championships in the series. On May 4, Si Yajie/Lin Shan won the women's synchronized 10-meter platform final in the Kazan Station of the FINA Diving Series with 324.24 points. The 2018 National Diving Championships ended on September 26 at the Chongqing Olympic Sports Center Swimming and Diving Hall. On the women's side, Shaanxi team Lin Shan won the individual all-around championship. On October 13, 2018, in the diving competition of the 3rd Summer Youth Olympic Games in Buenos Aires, Argentina, Chinese player Lin Shan won the women's 10-meter platform championship with a total score of 466.50 points. On October 16, 2018, the diving competition of the 2018 Youth Olympic Games in Buenos Aires. In the women's 3-meter springboard, Chinese player Lin Shan won the championship with a total score of 505.50 points, which was her second gold in the competition. On October 18, the diving competition of the 2018 Youth Olympic Games in Buenos Aires. In the transnational mixed men's and women's team competition, Chinese player Lin Shan partnered with Colombia's Restrepo to win the championship with 391.35 points.

On July 1, 2019, Lin Shan was selected into the 18-person roster for the World Swimming Championships. On the evening of July 16, in the mixed men's and women's team finals of the 2019 Gwangju World Swimming Championships, Chinese combination Lin Shan/Yang Jian won the championship with 416.65 points. On October 24, Lin Shan won the runner-up in the women's 10-meter platform final of the Seventh Military World Games. In November, Lin Shan won the championship in the women's single 10-meter platform competition at the 2019 FINA Diving Grand Prix Malaysia with 367.80 points. From November 22nd to 24th, Lin Shan Lin Shan won the runner-up in the women's single ten-meter platform final of the ninth station of the 2019 FINA World Diving Grand Prix with 357.60 points.

At noon on September 6, 2021, Lin Shan ranked sixth in the competition for the 10-meter platform of the women's team diving competition at the 14th National Games. On September 8, she won the women's individual all-around diving gold medal at the 14th Games of the People's Republic of China with a total score of 698.25 points.

On June 9, 2022, she was selected into the Chinese diving team's entry list for the 2022 19th World Swimming Championships in Budapest announced by the Chinese Swimming Association. On June 29th, in the mixed doubles 3-meter springboard final of the 2022 World Swimming Championships, Lin Shan/Zhu Zifeng won the championship with 324.15 points. On November 20, the 2022 National Diving Championship ended in Jiangmen, Guangdong. Lin Shan won the women's 1-meter springboard gold medal. At the 2022 National Diving Championships, Lin Shan/Mei Yingxin won the women's synchronized 3-meter springboard championship.

On July 15, 2023, Lin Shan won the championship in the women's 1-meter diving final of the 2023 World Aquatics Championships. On December 2, in the women's 3-meter springboard final of the diving trials (second stop) of the Doha World Aquatics Championships, Guangdong Haiyin team player Lin Shan won third place with a score of 351.95 points.
