= Zhu Zifeng =

Chinese diver (born 2002)

Personal information
- Nationality: Chinese
- Born: 28 July 2002 (age 23)

Sport
- Country: China
- Sport: Diving
Medal record
Men's diving
Representing China
World Championships
Gold medal – first place	2022 Budapest	3 m mixed synchro
Gold medal – first place	2023 Fukuoka	3 m mixed synchro
Gold medal – first place	2025 Singapore	10 m synchro

Zhu Zifeng (born 28 July 2002) is a Chinese diver.

== Career ==
Zhu made his World Aquatics Championships in 2022 and won a gold medal in the 3 metre synchro event, along with Lin Shan, with a score of 324.15. Zhu and Lin repeated as champions in the 3 metre synchro event in 2023 with a score of 326.10. He again competed at the 2025 World Aquatics Championships and won a gold medal in the 10 metre synchro event, along with Cheng Zilong, with a score of 429.63, finishing 0.93 points ahead of the Neutral Athletes B silver medalists.
