= Cheng Zilong =

Chinese diver (born 2006)

Personal information
- Nationality: Chinese
- Born: 27 March 2006 (age 20)

Sport
- Country: China
- Sport: Diving
Medal record
Men's diving
Representing China
World Championships
Gold medal – first place	2025 Singapore	10 m synchro
Gold medal – first place	2025 Singapore	Team
Bronze medal – third place	2025 Singapore	3 m mixed synchro
Asian Championships
Gold medal – first place	2025 Ahmedabad	10 m platform

Cheng Zilong (born 27 March 2006) is a Chinese diver.

== Career ==
Cheng competed at the 2025 World Aquatics Championships and won a gold medal in the team event with a score of 466.25. He then won a gold medal in the 10 metre synchro event, along with Zhu Zifeng, with a score of 429.63, finishing 0.93 points ahead of the Neutral Athletes B silver medalists. He also won a bronze medal in the mixed 3 metre synchro event, along with Li Yajie, with a score 305.70.
