= Diving at the 2025 World Aquatics Championships =

- Host city: Singapore
- Date(s): 26 July – 3 August
- Venue(s): OCBC Aquatic Centre
- Events: 13

Diving at the 2025 World Aquatics Championships was held from 26 July to 3 August 2025 at the OCBC Aquatic Centre in Singapore.

== Schedule ==
13 events were held.

All times are local (UTC+8).

Date	Time	Event
26 July 2025	10:00	1 m Springboard Women
26 July 2025	15:30	Mixed team event
26 July 2025	18:00	1 m Springboard Women
27 July 2025	10:00	1 m Springboard Men
27 July 2025	15:00	10 m Platform synchro mixed
27 July 2025	17:30	1 m Springboard Men
28 July 2025	10:00	3 m Springboard synchro Men
28 July 2025	13:30	10 m Platform synchro Women
28 July 2025	16:00	3 m Springboard synchro Men
28 July 2025	18:00	10 m Platform synchro Women
29 July 2025	09:00	3 m Springboard synchro Women
29 July 2025	12:00	10 m Platform synchro Men
29 July 2025	15:30	3 m Springboard synchro Women
29 July 2025	17:30	10 m Platform synchro Men
30 July 2025	10:00	10 m Platform Women
30 July 2025	17:00	3 m Springboard synchro mixed
31 July 2025	09:00	3 m Springboard Men
31 July 2025	15:30	10 m Platform Women semifinals
31 July 2025	18:15	10 m Platform Women
1 August 2025	09:00	3 m Springboard Women
1 August 2025	14:00	3 m Springboard Men semifinals
1 August 2025	17:30	3 m Springboard Men
2 August 2025	09:00	10 m Platform Men
2 August 2025	15:00	3 m Springboard Women semifinals
2 August 2025	18:00	3 m Springboard Women
3 August 2025	10:00	10 m Platform Men semifinal
3 August 2025	17:30	10m Platform Men

== Medal summary ==
=== Medal table ===
* Host nation (Singapore)

Rank	Nation	Gold	Silver	Bronze	Total
1	China	9	3	4	16
2	Australia	2	1	0	3
3	Mexico	1	4	2	7
4	Italy	1	0	2	3
5	Great Britain	0	1	1	2
5	Neutral Athletes B (Note: In accordance with sanctions imposed following by the 2022 Russian invasion of Ukraine, athletes from Russia were not permitted to use the name, flag, or anthem of Russian Federation. They instead participated as "Neutral Athletes B (NAB)" and under the World Aquatics flag.)	0	1	1	2
5	North Korea	0	1	1	2
8	Germany	0	1	0	1
8	Ukraine	0	1	0	1
10	Japan	0	0	1	1
10	United States	0	0	1	1
Totals (11 entries)		13	13	13	39

=== Men ===
Event	Gold		Silver		Bronze	
1 metre springboard	Zheng Jiuyuan; China	443.70	Osmar Olvera; Mexico	429.60	Yan Siyu; China	405.50
3 metre springboard	Osmar Olvera; Mexico	529.55	Cao Yuan; China	522.70	Wang Zongyuan; China	515.55
10 metre platform	Cassiel Rousseau; Australia	534.89	Oleksiy Sereda; Ukraine	515.20	Randal Willars; Mexico	511.95
Synchronized; 3 metre springboard	China; Wang Zongyuan; Zheng Jiuyuan	467.31	Mexico; Juan Celaya; Osmar Olvera	449.28	Great Britain; Anthony Harding; Jack Laugher	405.33
Synchronized; 10 metre platform	China; Cheng Zilong; Zhu Zifeng	429.63	Neutral Athletes B Nikita Shleikher; Ruslan Ternovoi	428.70	United States; Joshua Hedberg; Carson Tyler	410.70

=== Women ===
Event	Gold		Silver		Bronze	
1 metre springboard	Maddison Keeney; Australia	308.00	Li Yajie; China	290.25	Chiara Pellacani; Italy	270.80
3 metre springboard	Chen Yiwen; China	389.70	Chen Jia; China	356.40	Chiara Pellacani; Italy	323.20
10 metre platform	Chen Yuxi; China	430.50	Pauline Pfeif; Germany	367.10	Xie Peiling; China	358.20
Synchronized; 3 metre springboard	China; Chen Jia; Chen Yiwen	325.20	Great Britain; Yasmin Harper; Scarlett Mew Jensen	298.35	Mexico; Lía Cueva; Mía Cueva	294.36
Synchronized; 10 metre platform	China; Chen Yuxi; Zhang Minjie	349.26	Mexico; Gabriela Agúndez; Alejandra Estudillo	304.80	North Korea; Jo Jin-mi; Kim Mi-hwa	293.34

=== Mixed ===
Event	Gold		Silver		Bronze	
3 metre springboard	Italy; Matteo Santoro; Chiara Pellacani	308.13	Australia; Cassiel Rousseau; Maddison Keeney	307.26	China; Cheng Zilong; Li Yajie	305.70
10 metre platform	China; Zhu Yongxin; Xie Peiling	323.04	North Korea; Choe Wi-hyon; Jo Jin-mi	322.98	Neutral Athletes B Aleksandr Bondar; Anna Konanykhina	311.88
Team	China; Cheng Zilong; Chen Yiwen; Cao Yuan; Chen Yuxi	466.25	Mexico; Osmar Olvera; Randal Willars; Alejandra Estudillo; Zyanya Parra	426.30	Japan; Reo Nishida; Sho Sakai; Rin Kaneto; Sayaka Mikami	409.65
