= Jackson Rondinelli =

Brazilian diver (born 1994)

Personal information
- Full name: Jackson André Rondinelli de Oliveira
- Nicknames: Jack, Rondi
- Nationality: Brazilian
- Born: 20 May 1994 (age 32) São Paulo
- Height: 1.63 m (5 ft 4 in)
- Weight: 65 Kg

Sport
- Country: Brazil
- Sport: Diving
- Events: 10m, 10m synchro, 3m, 3m synchro, 1m
- Club: Esporte Clube Pinheiros
Medal record
30 gold 20 silver 15 bronze

Jackson Rondinelli (born 20 May 1994) is a Brazilian diver. He competed in the men's synchronized ten metre platform event at the 2016 Summer Olympics. He started diving at the age of 15 in São Paulo, and had his first competition as a national open in 2010.
