= Li Yajie =

Chinese diver (born 2002)

Personal information
- Born: 16 July 2002 (age 23)

Sport
- Country: China
- Sport: Diving
Medal record
Diving
Representing China
World Championships
Gold medal – first place	2022 Budapest	1 m springboard
Silver medal – second place	2023 Fukuoka	1 m springboard
Silver medal – second place	2025 Singapore	1 m springboard
Bronze medal – third place	2025 Singapore	3 m mixed synchro

Li Yajie (born 16 July 2002) is a Chinese diver. She competed at the 2022 World Aquatics Championships, winning the gold medal in the women's 1 metre springboard event.
