= Bahamas at the 2025 World Aquatics Championships =

- Flag of Bahamas
- World Aquatics code: BAH
- National federation: Bahamas Aquatic Federation
- Website: www.bahamasaquatics.com

in Singapore
- Competitors: 4 in 1 sport
- Medals: Gold 0 Silver 0 Bronze 0 Total 0

World Aquatics Championships appearances
- 1973; 1975; 1978; 1982; 1986; 1991; 1994; 1998; 2001; 2003; 2005; 2007; 2009; 2011; 2013; 2015; 2017; 2019; 2022; 2023; 2024; 2025

Bahamas is competing at the 2025 World Aquatics Championships in Singapore from 11 July to 3 August 2025.

== Competitors ==
The following is the list of competitors in the Championships.

Sport	Men	Women	Total
Swimming	2	2	4
Total	2	2	4

== Swimming ==
Men

Athlete	Event	Heat		Semifinal		Final	
Athlete	Event	Time	Rank	Time	Rank	Time	Rank
Lamar Taylor	50 m freestyle	22.05 NR	20	Did not advance			
Lamar Taylor	100 m freestyle	48.52 NR	22	Did not advance			
Lamar Taylor	50 m backstroke	25.45	39	Did not advance			
Mark Anthony Thompson	50 m breaststroke	29.88	65	Did not advance			
Mark Anthony Thompson	100 m breaststroke	1:08.56	66	Did not advance			

Women

Athlete	Event	Heat		Semifinal		Final	
Athlete	Event	Time	Rank	Time	Rank	Time	Rank
Victoria Russell	50 m freestyle	27.59	58	Did not advance			
Victoria Russell	50 m butterfly	29.41	60	Did not advance			
Zaylie Elizabeth Thompson	100 m freestyle	59.45	57	Did not advance			
