= Haiti at the 2025 World Aquatics Championships =

- Flag of Haiti
- World Aquatics code: HAI
- National federation: Fédération Haitienne des Sports Aquatiques
- Website: fhsas.com

in Singapore
- Competitors: 2 in 1 sport
- Medals: Gold 0 Silver 0 Bronze 0 Total 0

World Aquatics Championships appearances
- 2015; 2017; 2019; 2022; 2023; 2024; 2025

Haiti is competing at the 2025 World Aquatics Championships in Singapore from 11 July to 3 August 2025.

== Competitors ==
The following is the list of competitors in the Championships.

Sport	Men	Women	Total
Swimming	1	1	2
Total	1	1	2

== Swimming ==
Men

Athlete	Event	Heat		Semifinal		Final	
Athlete	Event	Time	Rank	Time	Rank	Time	Rank
Alexandre Grand'Pierre	50 m freestyle	23.97	71	Did not advance			
Alexandre Grand'Pierre	50 m breaststroke	28.52	51	Did not advance			

Women

Athlete	Event	Heat		Semifinal		Final	
Athlete	Event	Time	Rank	Time	Rank	Time	Rank
Mayah Chouloute	50 m freestyle	29.14	75	Did not advance			
Mayah Chouloute	50 m butterfly	31.33	72	Did not advance			
