= List of Haitian records in swimming =

The Haitian records in swimming are the fastest ever performances of swimmers from Haiti, which are recognized and ratified by the Fédération Haitienne des Sports Aquatiques (FHSA).

All records were set in finals unless noted otherwise.

== Long Course (50 m) ==
=== Men ===
Event	Time		Name	Club	Date	Meet	Location	Ref
50 m freestyle	23.20		Christian Jerome	Haiti	12 July 2026	Pan American Championships	Ibague, Colombia	
100 m freestyle	51.12	b	Raphael Grand'Pierre	Haiti	29 July 2026	CAC Games	Santo Domingo, Dominican Republic	
200 m freestyle	1:54.26	h	Davidson Vincent	Azura Florida Aquatic Club	29 April 2023	Puerto Rico International Open	San Juan, Puerto Rico	
400 m freestyle	4:18.02		Christian Jerome	Haiti	11 July 2026	Pan American Championships	Ibague, Colombia	
800 m freestyle	9:06.54	tt	Davidson Vincent	Azura Florida Aquatics	9 February 2023	Southern Zone South Sectional Championships	Orlando, United States	
1500 m freestyle	18:07.76		Christian Jerome	Haiti	15 August 2023	CCCAN Championships	Santa Tecla, El Salvador	
50m backstroke	29.19	h	Christian Jerome	Haiti	19 April 2025	CARIFTA Championships	Couva, Trinidad and Tobago	
50m backstroke	28.97	h, #	Christian Jerome	Haiti	4 April 2026	CARIFTA Championships	Le Lamentin, Martinique	
100m backstroke	1:03.61	h	Christian Jerome	Haiti	16 May 2025	Pan American Championships	Medellín, Colombia	
200m backstroke	2:58.82		Jude Jerome	Haiti	9 April 2023	CARIFTA Championships	Willemstad, Curaçao	
50m breaststroke	28.39	h	Alexandre Grand'Pierre	Haiti	13 February 2024	World Championships	Doha, Qatar	
100m breaststroke	1:01.85	h	Alexandre Grand'Pierre	Haiti	11 February 2024	World Championships	Doha, Qatar	
200m breaststroke	2:22.90	h	Alexandre Grand'Pierre	Haiti	18 June 2024	CCCAN Championships	Monterrey, Mexico	
50m butterfly	24.49		Christian Jerome	Haiti	11 July 2026	Pan American Championships	Ibague, Colombia	
100m butterfly	54.04	h	Davidson Vincent	Azura Florida Aquatic Club	28 April 2023	Puerto Rico International Open	San Juan, Puerto Rico	
200m butterfly	2:04.82		Christian Jerome	Haiti	21 April 2025	CARIFTA Championships	Couva, Trinidad and Tobago	
200m individual medley	2:12.59	h	Alexandre Grand'Pierre	Haiti	15 August 2023	CCCAN Championships	Santa Tecla, El Salvador	
400m individual medley	4:52.41		Christian Jerome	Haiti	20 April 2025	CARIFTA Championships	Couva, Trinidad and Tobago	
4×100m freestyle relay								
4×200m freestyle relay								
4×100m medley relay								

Legend: # – Record awaiting ratification by FHSA; WR – World record; AM – Americas record;
Records not set in finals: h – heat; sf – semifinal; r – relay 1st leg; rh – relay heat 1st leg; b – B final; † – en route to final mark; so – swim-off; tt – time trial

=== Women ===
Event	Time		Name	Club	Date	Meet	Location	Ref
50m freestyle	27.35	h	Naomy Grand'Pierre	Haiti	2 July 2016	CISC Championships	Nassau, Bahamas	
100m freestyle	1:03.03	h	Naomy Grand'Pierre	Haiti	25 July 2018	CAC Games	Barranquilla, Colombia	
200m freestyle	2:22.53	h, †	Emilie Grand'Pierre	Haiti	1 May 2021	UANA Tokyo Qualifier	Clermont, United States	
400m freestyle	4:53.96	h	Emilie Grand'Pierre	Haiti	1 May 2021	UANA Tokyo Qualifier	Clermont, United States	
800m freestyle								
1500m freestyle								
50m backstroke	32.45	h	Britheny Joassaint	Haiti	26 July 2017	World Championships	Budapest, Hungary	
100m backstroke	1:12.12	h	Britheny Joassaint	Haiti	24 July 2017	World Championships	Budapest, Hungary	
200m backstroke								
50m breaststroke	34.11		Emilie Grand'Pierre	Haiti	29 April 2021	UANA Tokyo Qualifier	Clermont, United States	
100m breaststroke	1:14.82	h	Emilie Grand'Pierre	Haiti	25 July 2021	Olympic Games	Tokyo, Japan	
200m breaststroke	2:49.04		Emilie Grand'Pierre	Haiti	25 June 2021	CCCAN Championships	San Juan, Puerto Rico	
50m butterfly	30.10	h	Naomy Grand'Pierre	Haiti	30 June 2016	CISC Championships	Nassau, Bahamas	
100m butterfly	1:08.84	h	Laila Symone Michel	Haiti	29 June 2019	CCCAN Championships	Bridgetown, Barbados	
200m butterfly	2:41.37	h	Laila Symone Michel	Haiti	1 July 2019	CCCAN Championships	Bridgetown, Barbados	
200m individual medley	2:34.84	h	Emilie Grand'Pierre	Haiti	1 July 2019	CCCAN Championships	Bridgetown, Barbados	
400m individual medley								
4×100m freestyle relay								
4×200m freestyle relay								
4×100m medley relay								

Legend: # – Record awaiting ratification by FHSA; WR – World record; AM – Americas record;
Records not set in finals: h – heat; sf – semifinal; r – relay 1st leg; rh – relay heat 1st leg; b – B final; † – en route to final mark; so – swim-off; tt – time trial

== Short Course (25 m) ==
=== Men ===
Event	Time		Name	Club	Date	Meet	Location	Ref
50m freestyle	23.45		Davidson Vincent	Azura Florida Aquatics	30 October 2021	Puerto Rico International Open	San Juan, Puerto Rico	
100m freestyle	49.79	h	Davidson Vincent	Haiti	4 November 2022	World Cup	Indianapolis, United States	
200m freestyle	1:51.29	h	Davidson Vincent	Haiti	5 November 2022	World Cup	Indianapolis, United States	
400m freestyle	4:37.52	h	Christian Jerome	Haiti	29 October 2021	Puerto Rico International Open	San Juan, Puerto Rico	
800m freestyle	9:25.38		Christian Jerome	Haiti	28 October 2021	Puerto Rico International Open	San Juan, Puerto Rico	
1500m freestyle	18:17.41		Christian Jerome	Haiti	30 October 2021	Puerto Rico International Open	San Juan, Puerto Rico	
50m backstroke	30.16	h	Christian Jerome	Haiti	28 October 2021	Puerto Rico International Open	San Juan, Puerto Rico	
100m backstroke								
200m backstroke								
50m breaststroke	27.99	h	Alexandre Grand'Pierre	Haiti	17 December 2022	World Championships	Melbourne, Australia	
100m breaststroke	1:01.07	h	Alexandre Grand'Pierre	Haiti	14 December 2022	World Championships	Melbourne, Australia	
200m breaststroke	2:18.78	h	Alexandre Grand'Pierre	Haiti	18 December 2021	World Championships	Abu Dhabi, United Arab Emirates	
50m butterfly	24.40	h	Davidson Vincent	Haiti	5 November 2022	World Cup	Indianapolis, United States	
100m butterfly	53.28	h	Davidson Vincent	Azura Florida Aquatics	29 October 2021	Puerto Rico International Open	San Juan, Puerto Rico	
200m butterfly	2:00.84		Davidson Vincent	Azura Florida Aquatics	31 October 2021	Puerto Rico International Open	San Juan, Puerto Rico	
100m individual medley								
200m individual medley	2:28.33	h	Christian Jerome	Haiti	31 October 2021	Puerto Rico International Open	San Juan, Puerto Rico	
400m individual medley								
4×50m freestyle relay								
4×100m freestyle relay								
4×200m freestyle relay								
4×50m medley relay								
4×100m medley relay								

Legend: # – Record awaiting ratification by FHSA; WR – World record; AM – Americas record;
Records not set in finals: h – heat; sf – semifinal; r – relay 1st leg; rh – relay heat 1st leg; b – B final; † – en route to final mark; so – swim-off; tt – time trial

=== Women ===
Event	Time		Name	Club	Date	Meet	Location	Ref
50m freestyle	27.96	h	Naomy Grand'Pierre	Haiti	7 December 2016	World Championships	Windsor, Canada	
100m freestyle	58.55	h	Naomy Grand'Pierre	Haiti	7 December 2016	World Championships	Windsor, Canada	
200m freestyle								
400m freestyle								
800m freestyle								
1500m freestyle								
50m backstroke	31.48	h	Britheny Joassaint	Haiti	14 December 2018	World Championships	Hangzhou, China	
100m backstroke	1:06.96	h	Britheny Joassaint	Haiti	6 December 2016	World Championships	Windsor, Canada	
200m backstroke	2:26.10	h	Britheny Joassaint	Haiti	8 December 2016	World Championships	Windsor, Canada	
50m breaststroke	33.71	h	Emilie Grand'Pierre	Haiti	17 December 2022	World Championships	Melbourne, Australia	
100m breaststroke	1:15.13	h	Emilie Grand'Pierre	Haiti	19 December 2021	World Championships	Abu Dhabi, United Arab Emirates	
200m breaststroke								
50m butterfly	33.73	h, †	Mayah Chouloute	Haiti	13 December 2024	World Championships	Budapest, Hungary	
100m butterfly	1:16.31	h	Mayah Chouloute	Haiti	13 December 2024	World Championships	Budapest, Hungary	
200m butterfly								
100m individual medley	1:06.11	h	Naomy Grand'Pierre	Haiti	8 December 2016	World Championships	Windsor, Canada	
200m individual medley								
400m individual medley								
4×50m freestyle relay								
4×100m freestyle relay								
4×200m freestyle relay								
4×50m medley relay								
4×100m medley relay								

Legend: # – Record awaiting ratification by FHSA; WR – World record; AM – Americas record;
Records not set in finals: h – heat; sf – semifinal; r – relay 1st leg; rh – relay heat 1st leg; b – B final; † – en route to final mark; so – swim-off; tt – time trial
