= 2021 FINA World Swimming Championships (25 m) – Women's 100 metre breaststroke =

Swimming competition

Women's 100 metre breaststroke at the 2021 FINA World Swimming Championships (25 m)
- Venue: Etihad Arena
- Location: Abu Dhabi, United Arab Emirates
- Dates: 19 December (heats and semifinals); 20 December (final)
- Competitors: 50 from 46 nations
- Winning time: 1:03.47

Medalists
gold medal	Tang Qianting	China
silver medal	Sophie Hansson	Sweden
bronze medal	Mona McSharry	Ireland

The Women's 100 metre breaststroke competition of the 2021 FINA World Swimming Championships (25 m) was held on 19 and 20 December 2021.

== Records ==
Prior to the competition, the existing world and championship records were as follows.

World record	Rūta Meilutytė (LTU) Alia Atkinson (JAM) Alia Atkinson (JAM)	1:02.36	Moscow, Russia Doha, Qatar Chartres, France	12 October 2013 6 December 2014 26 August 2016
Competition record	Alia Atkinson (JAM)	1:02.36	Doha, Qatar	6 December 2014

== Results ==
=== Heats ===
The heats were started on 19 December at 10:45.

Rank	Heat	Lane	Name	Nationality	Time	Notes
1	6	6	Sophie Hansson	Sweden	1:04.50	Q
2	6	3	Mona McSharry	Ireland	1:04.59	Q
3	6	4	Alia Atkinson	Jamaica	1:04.88	Q
4	4	8	Tang Qianting	China	1:04.94	Q
5	4	6	Molly Renshaw	Great Britain	1:05.03	Q
6	6	2	Kotryna Teterevkova	Lithuania	1:05.15	Q
7	4	2	Emelie Fast	Sweden	1:05.36	Q
8	6	7	Jessica Vall	Spain	1:05.42	Q
9	4	3	Anastasia Gorbenko	Israel	1:05.47	Q
10	6	5	Eneli Jefimova	Estonia	1:05.57	Q
11	4	4	Martina Carraro	Italy	1:05.61	Q
12	4	5	Emily Escobedo	United States	1:05.69	Q
13	4	7	Lisa Mamie	Switzerland	1:05.83	Q
14	5	5	Evgeniia Chikunova	Russian Swimming Federation	1:05.90	Q
15	5	6	Nika Godun	Russian Swimming Federation	1:06.08	Q
16	6	0	Lena Kreundl	Austria	1:06.33	Q
17	5	7	Alina Zmushka	Belarus	1:06.41	
18	5	0	Niamh Coyne	Ireland	1:06.44	
19	6	1	Veera Kivirinta	Finland	1:06.52	
20	4	0	Martina Barbeito	Argentina	1:06.86	
21	4	9	Eszter Békési	Hungary	1:07.00	
22	1	6	Pamela Alencar	Brazil	1:07.46	
23	6	8	Tjaša Vozel	Slovenia	1:07.52	
24	5	9	Back Su-yeon	South Korea	1:07.54	
25	5	8	Cornelia Pammer	Austria	1:07.76	
26	3	2	Lillian Higgs	Bahamas	1:07.87	NR
27	3	4	Ana Blažević	Croatia	1:07.89	
28	6	9	Melissa Rodríguez	Mexico	1:07.98	NR
29	3	6	Anastasia Basisto	Moldova	1:08.22	
30	3	3	Justine Delmas	France	1:08.89	
31	3	5	Maria Drasidou	Greece	1:08.92	
32	3	1	Emily Santos	Panama	1:10.26	NR
33	2	7	Kamonchanok Kwanmuang	Thailand	1:10.35	
34	3	7	Nàdia Tudó	Andorra	1:11.11	
35	3	8	Adelaida Pchelintseva	Kazakhstan	1:11.31	
36	3	9	Elisa Funes	El Salvador	1:11.36	NR
37	2	4	Krista Jurado	Guatemala	1:12.51	
38	3	0	Alicia Kok Shun	Mauritius	1:13.18	NR
39	2	1	Valentina Aloisio	Bolivia	1:14.01	
40	2	2	Mariam Mithqal	Jordan	1:15.09	NR
41	2	3	Emilie Grand'Pierre	Haiti	1:15.13	NR
42	2	8	Anaika Charles	Grenada	1:16.24	
43	2	6	Lara Dashti	Kuwait	1:16.56	
44	2	9	Latroya Pina	Cape Verde	1:18.73	
45	1	7	Ekaterina Smorkalova	Kyrgyzstan	1:19.65	
46	1	2	Mei-Li Tan Minnich	Cambodia	1:19.87	
47	1	4	Taeyanna Adams	Federated States of Micronesia	1:20.90	
48	2	0	Upaasti Maharjan	Nepal	1:21.77	
49	1	5	Mariama Touré	Guinea	1:36.59	
50	1	8	Aichata Konate	Mali	1:51.78	
	1	1	Unilez Takyi	Ghana	DSQ	
	2	5	Claudia Verdino	Monaco	DSQ	
	5	3	Ida Hulkko	Finland	DSQ	
	5	4	Arianna Castiglioni	Italy	DSQ	
	1	3	Lucie Kouadio-Patinier	Ivory Coast	DNS	
	4	1	Andrea Podmaníková	Slovakia	DNS	
	5	1	Florine Gaspard	Belgium	DNS	
	5	2	Lydia Jacoby	United States	DNS	

=== Semifinals ===
The semifinals were started on 19 December at 19:48.

Rank	Heat	Lane	Name	Nationality	Time	Notes
1	1	5	Tang Qianting	China	1:03.99	Q, AS
2	2	4	Sophie Hansson	Sweden	1:04.17	Q, NR
3	1	4	Mona McSharry	Ireland	1:04.22	Q, NR
4	2	5	Alia Atkinson	Jamaica	1:04.26	Q
5	2	8	Nika Godun	Russian Swimming Federation	1:04.34	Q
6	2	3	Molly Renshaw	Great Britain	1:04.43	Q, NR
7	1	3	Kotryna Teterevkova	Lithuania	1:04.54	Q
8	1	7	Emily Escobedo	United States	1:04.81	Q
9	1	1	Evgeniia Chikunova	Russian Swimming Federation	1:04.85	
10	2	7	Martina Carraro	Italy	1:04.89	
11	2	2	Anastasia Gorbenko	Israel	1:04.95	
12	2	6	Emelie Fast	Sweden	1:05.28	
13	1	2	Eneli Jefimova	Estonia	1:05.44	
14	2	1	Lisa Mamie	Switzerland	1:05.54	
15	1	6	Jessica Vall	Spain	1:05.80	
16	1	8	Lena Kreundl	Austria	1:05.83	

=== Final ===
The final was held on 20 December at 19:42.

Rank	Lane	Name	Nationality	Time	Notes
1st place, gold medalist(s)	4	Tang Qianting	China	1:03.47	AS
2nd place, silver medalist(s)	5	Sophie Hansson	Sweden	1:03.50	NR
3rd place, bronze medalist(s)	3	Mona McSharry	Ireland	1:03.92	NR
4	6	Alia Atkinson	Jamaica	1:04.03	
5	7	Molly Renshaw	Great Britain	1:04.37	NR
6	2	Nika Godun	Russian Swimming Federation	1:04.43	
7	1	Kotryna Teterevkova	Lithuania	1:04.64	
8	8	Emily Escobedo	United States	1:05.14	
