= Matheus Melecchi =

Brazilian swimmer (born 2005)

Personal information
- Nationality: Brazil
- Born: 11 November 2005 (age 20) Porto Alegre, Brazil

Sport
- Sport: Swimming
- Event: Marathon swimming
Medal record
Representing Brazil
South American Games
Gold medal – first place	2026 Santa Fe	10 km open water
Pan American Championships
Gold medal – first place	2025 Medellín	10 km 20-22
Junior Pan American Games
Gold medal – first place	2025 Asunción	10 km open water
Gold medal – first place	2025 Asunción	1500 m freestyle

Matheus de Freitas Melecchi (born 11 November 2005) is an Brazilian marathon swimmer. He is a gold medalist at the Pan American Championships and South American Games.

== Career ==
Melecchi competed in the 2024 World Aquatics Open Water Swimming World Cup, in which he topped the junior men's standings.

Melecchi competed in the 10 km 20-22 event of the 2025 Pan American Aquatics Championships and won a gold medal, leading him to qualify for the Junior Pan American Games and the World Aquatics Championships. He competed in four events at the aforementioned World Aquatics Championships held in Singapore. Then at the Junior Pan American Games held in Asunción, Paraguay, he won the gold medal at the men's 10 km event.

Melecchi competed in the men's 10 km event at the 2026 Pan Pacific Swimming Championships held in Long Beach, California, U.S., where he finished in eleventh place. He then competed at the 2026 South American Games held in Santa Fe Province, where he won the gold medal in the men's 10 km event, becoming the first person to win a gold medal at the games.
