= 2024 World Aquatics Swimming Championships (25 m) – Women's 100 metre butterfly =

Swimming competition

Women's 100 metre butterfly at the 2024 World Aquatics Swimming Championships (25 m)
- Venue: Duna Arena
- Location: Budapest, Hungary
- Dates: 13 December (heats and semifinals); 14 December (final)
- Competitors: 50
- Winning time: 52.71 WR

Medalists
gold medal	Gretchen Walsh	United States
silver medal	Tessa Giele	Netherlands
bronze medal	Alexandria Perkins	Australia

The women's 100 metre butterfly event at the 2024 World Aquatics Swimming Championships (25 m) was held from 13 to 14 December 2024 at the Duna Arena in Budapest, Hungary.

== Records ==
Prior to the competition, the existing world and championship records were as follows:

World record	Maggie Mac Neil (CAN)	54.05	Melbourne, Australia	18 December 2022
Competition record	Maggie Mac Neil (CAN)	54.05	Melbourne, Australia	18 December 2022

The following records were established during the competition:

Date	Round	Name	Nationality	Time	Record
13 December	Heat 5	Gretchen Walsh	United States	53.24	WR
13 December	Semifinal 2	Gretchen Walsh	United States	52.87	WR
14 December	Final	Gretchen Walsh	United States	52.71	WR

== Results ==
=== Heats ===
The heats were started on 13 December at 10:01.

Rank	Heat	Lane	Name	Nationality	Time	Notes
1	5	4	Gretchen Walsh	United States	53.24	Q, WR
2	4	6	Tessa Giele	Netherlands	55.71	Q, NR
3	4	4	Louise Hansson	Sweden	55.86	Q
4	3	4	Alexandria Perkins	Australia	55.97	Q
5	5	2	Ellen Walshe	Ireland	56.17	Q, NR
6	4	5	Laura Lahtinen	Finland	56.20	Q
7	4	3	Arina Surkova	Neutral Athletes B	56.28	Q
8	5	3	Mizuki Hirai	Japan	56.30	Q
9	4	2	Anastasiya Kuliashova	Neutral Athletes A	56.42	Q
10	5	5	Lily Price	Australia	56.50	Q
11	5	6	Chen Luying	China	56.84	Q
12	3	3	Daria Klepikova	Neutral Athletes B	56.88	Q
13	3	7	Vanessa Hazel Ouwehand	New Zealand	56.97	Q, NR
14	3	1	Georgia Damasioti	Greece	57.14	Q
15	4	1	Helena Bach	Denmark	57.40	Q
16	5	8	Iris Julia Berger	Austria	57.44	Q
17	3	2	Sara Junevik	Sweden	57.49	R
18	3	6	Elena Capretta	Italy	57.56	R
19	4	7	Panna Ugrai	Hungary	57.95	
20	5	1	Nicholle Toh	Singapore	58.03	
21	5	7	Gong Zhenqi	China	58.29	
22	4	8	Paulina Peda	Poland	58.54	
23	3	8	Yeung Hoi Ching	Hong Kong	58.70	
24	3	0	Kristen Elena Romano	Puerto Rico	58.93	NR
25	4	0	María José Mata Cocco	Neutral Athletes C	58.96	
26	5	9	Sofia Spodarenko	Kazakhstan	59.22	
27	4	9	Zora Ripkova	Slovakia	59.23	
28	2	3	Ana Nizharadze	Georgia	1:00.31	
29	3	9	Alexia Sotomayor	Peru	1:00.46	
30	2	4	Varsenik Manucharyan	Armenia	1:00.52	
31	2	5	Jessica Calderbank	Jamaica	1:00.62	
32	2	7	Karina Solera	Costa Rica	1:00.66	NR
33	2	2	Oumy Diop	Senegal	1:00.77	NR
34	2	1	M.V. Schutzmeier	Nicaragua	1:01.15	
35	1	8	Kim Sol Song	North Korea	1:01.58	
36	2	8	Paige Schendelaar-Kemp	Samoa	1:01.84	
37	2	6	I.B.P. Thorpe	Kenya	1:01.99	NR
38	5	0	Jaime Mote	South Africa	1:02.27	
39	2	0	Ashley Calderon	Honduras	1:02.51	
40	1	4	Anje Van As	Zimbabwe	1:02.56	
41	2	9	Cheang Weng Chi	Macau	1:03.48	
42	1	5	Davia Richardson	Belize	1:03.72	
43	1	0	Liana Planz	American Samoa	1:05.68	
44	1	9	Kaltra Meca	Albania	1:06.10	
45	1	3	Amaya Bollinger	Guam	1:06.38	
46	1	6	Amazya Eliya Ann Macrooy	Suriname	1:11.77	
47	1	1	Rana Saadeldin	Sudan	1:12.54	
48	1	7	Mayah Chouloute	Haiti	1:16.31	NR
	3	5	Regan Smith	United States	Did not start	
	1	2	Meral Ayn Latheef	Maldives	Disqualified	

=== Semifinals ===
The semifinals were started on 13 December at 18:20.

Rank	Heat	Lane	Name	Nationality	Time	Notes
1	2	4	Gretchen Walsh	United States	52.87	Q, WR
2	2	5	Louise Hansson	Sweden	55.03	Q
3	2	3	Ellen Walshe	Ireland	55.50	Q, NR
4	1	5	Alexandria Perkins	Australia	55.57	Q
5	1	6	Mizuki Hirai	Japan	55.68	Q
6	1	2	Lily Price	Australia	55.74	Q
7	1	4	Tessa Giele	Netherlands	55.50	Q, NR
8	1	7	Daria Klepikova	Neutral Athletes B	56.12	Q
9	2	6	Arina Surkova	Neutral Athletes B	56.20	R
10	1	3	Laura Lahtinen	Finland	56.26	R
11	1	8	Iris Julia Berger	Austria	56.38	NR
12	2	7	Chen Luying	China	56.48	
13	2	2	Anastasiya Kuliashova	Neutral Athletes A	56.57	
14	2	1	Vanessa Hazel Ouwehand	New Zealand	56.60	
15	1	1	Georgia Damasioti	Greece	57.12	
16	2	8	Helena Bach	Denmark	57.27	

=== Final ===
The final was held on 14 December at 17:32.

Rank	Lane	Name	Nationality	Time	Notes
1st place, gold medalist(s)	4	Gretchen Walsh	United States	52.71	WR
2nd place, silver medalist(s)	1	Tessa Giele	Netherlands	54.66	NR
3rd place, bronze medalist(s)	6	Alexandria Perkins	Australia	55.10	OC
4	5	Louise Hansson	Sweden	55.23	
5	2	Mizuki Hirai	Japan	55.61	
6	3	Ellen Walshe	Ireland	55.68	
7	7	Lily Price	Australia	55.82	
8	8	Laura Lahtinen	Finland	56.92	
