= Haiti at the 2017 World Aquatics Championships =

- Flag of Haiti
- World Aquatics code: HAI
- National federation: Fédération Haïtienne des Sports; Aquatiques et de Sauvetage
- Website: www.ashanasa.org

in Budapest, Hungary
- Competitors: 3 in 1 sport
- Medals: Gold 0 Silver 0 Bronze 0 Total 0

World Aquatics Championships appearances
- 2015; 2017; 2019; 2022; 2023; 2024; 2025

Haiti competed at the 2017 World Aquatics Championships in Budapest, Hungary from 14 July to 30 July.

== Swimming ==
Haiti has received a Universality invitation from FINA to send three swimmers (one man and two women) to the World Championships.

Athlete	Event	Heat		Semifinal		Final	
Athlete	Event	Time	Rank	Time	Rank	Time	Rank
Papy Dossous	Men's 50 m freestyle	27.98	114	did not advance			
Papy Dossous	Men's 50 m butterfly	30.08	78	did not advance			
Naomy Grand'Pierre	Women's 50 m freestyle	28.06	56	did not advance			
Naomy Grand'Pierre	Women's 50 m breaststroke	35.85	40	did not advance			
Britheny Joassaint	Women's 50 m backstroke	32.45	57	did not advance			
Britheny Joassaint	Women's 100 m backstroke	1:12.12	53	did not advance			
