= Haiti at the 2023 World Aquatics Championships =

- Flag of Haiti
- FINA code: HAI
- National federation: Fédération Haitienne des Sports Aquatiques
- Website: fhsas.com

in Fukuoka, Japan
- Competitors: 2 in 1 sport

World Aquatics Championships appearances
- 2015; 2017; 2019; 2022; 2023; 2024

Haiti is set to compete at the 2023 World Aquatics Championships in Fukuoka, Japan from 14 to 30 July.

== Swimming ==
Haiti entered 2 swimmers.

Men

Athlete	Event	Heat		Semifinal		Final	
Athlete	Event	Time	Rank	Time	Rank	Time	Rank
Alexandre Grand'Pierre	50 metre breaststroke	29.10	44	Did not advance			
Alexandre Grand'Pierre	100 metre breaststroke	1:02.65	41	Did not advance			
Christian Jerome	100 metre butterfly	55.83	56	Did not advance			
Christian Jerome	200 metre butterfly	2:08.54 NR	35	Did not advance			
