= Haiti at the 2019 World Aquatics Championships =

- Flag of Haiti
- FINA code: HAI
- National federation: Fédération Haitienne des Sports Aquatiques

in Gwangju, South Korea
- Competitors: 3 in 1 sport
- Medals: Gold 0 Silver 0 Bronze 0 Total 0

World Aquatics Championships appearances
- 2015; 2017; 2019; 2022; 2023; 2024

Haiti competed at the 2019 World Aquatics Championships in Gwangju, South Korea from 12 to 28 July.

== Swimming ==
Haiti entered three swimmers.

Men

Athlete	Event	Heat		Semifinal		Final	
Athlete	Event	Time	Rank	Time	Rank	Time	Rank
Guerby Ruuska	50 m freestyle	27.11	113	Did not advance			
Guerby Ruuska	100 m freestyle	1:01.04	114	Did not advance			
Davidson Vincent	50 m butterfly	DNS		Did not advance			
Davidson Vincent	100 m butterfly	58.91	69	Did not advance			

Women

Athlete	Event	Heat		Semifinal		Final	
Athlete	Event	Time	Rank	Time	Rank	Time	Rank
Naomy Grand-Pierre	50 m freestyle	29.07	72	Did not advance			
Naomy Grand-Pierre	50 m breaststroke	37.02	46	Did not advance			
