= Bahamas at the 2015 World Aquatics Championships =

- Flag of the Bahamas
- World Aquatics code: BAH
- National federation: Bahamas Swimming Federation
- Website: bahamasswimmingfederation.com

in Kazan, Russia
- Competitors: 5 in 1 sport
- Medals: Gold 0 Silver 0 Bronze 0 Total 0

World Aquatics Championships appearances
- 1973; 1975; 1978; 1982; 1986; 1991; 1994; 1998; 2001; 2003; 2005; 2007; 2009; 2011; 2013; 2015; 2017; 2019; 2022; 2023; 2024; 2025

Bahamas competed at the 2015 World Aquatics Championships in Kazan, Russia from 24 July to 9 August 2015.

== Swimming ==
Bahamian swimmers have achieved qualifying standards in the following events (up to a maximum of 2 swimmers in each event at the A-standard entry time, and 1 at the B-standard):

Men

Athlete	Event	Heat		Semifinal		Final	
Athlete	Event	Time	Rank	Time	Rank	Time	Rank
Elvis Burrows	50 m freestyle	23.06	39	did not advance			
Elvis Burrows	50 m butterfly	24.19	32	did not advance			
Dustin Tynes	50 m breaststroke	28.74	=43	did not advance			
Dustin Tynes	100 m breaststroke	1:01.13	28	did not advance			

Women

Athlete	Event	Heat		Semifinal		Final	
Athlete	Event	Time	Rank	Time	Rank	Time	Rank
Joanna Evans	800 m freestyle	8:49.96	29	—N/a		did not advance	
Arianna Vanderpool-Wallace	50 m freestyle	24.43	2 Q	24.38	5 Q	24.44	6
Arianna Vanderpool-Wallace	50 m butterfly	26.02	6 Q	25.81	5 Q	25.93	7
Ariel Weech	100 m freestyle	58.07	54	did not advance			
Ariel Weech	50 m backstroke	30.77	40	did not advance			
