= Open water swimming at the 2026 South American Games =

Open water swimming competitions at the 2026 South American Games

- Venue: Lago Sur
- Dates: September 13
- Competitors: 30 from 9 nations

Open water swimming competitions at the 2026 South American Games in Rosario, Santa Fe, and Rafaela, Argentina, were held on September 13 at Lago Sur in Santa Fe.

A total of two events were contested (one men and one women), both during the same day. The two athletes with the best placements for each event received qualifying quotas for the 2027 Pan American Games open water swimming competitions.

== Medal summary ==
=== Medal table ===
* Host nation (Argentina)

| Rank | Nation | Gold | Silver | Bronze | Total |
|---|---|---|---|---|---|
| 1 | Brazil | 2 | 1 | 1 | 4 |
| 2 | Ecuador | 0 | 1 | 0 | 1 |
| 3 | Argentina* | 0 | 0 | 1 | 1 |
| Totals (3 entries) | | 2 | 2 | 2 | 6 |

=== Medalists ===
| Event | Gold | | Silver | | Bronze | |
|---|---|---|---|---|---|---|
| Men's 10 km | Matheus Melecchi; Brazil | 1:47:53.5 | David Farinango; Ecuador | 1:47:57.2 | Victor Rodrigues; Brazil | 1:48:04.1 |
| Women's 10 km | Ana Marcela Cunha; Brazil | 1:56:58.2 | Viviane Jungblut; Brazil | 1:57:01.9 | Romina Imwinkelried; Argentina | 1:57:04.5 |

== Participation ==
Nine nations participated in open water swimming events of the 2026 South American Games.

- Argentina (4)
- Bolivia (4)
- Brazil (4)
- Chile (2)
- Ecuador (3)
- Paraguay (4)
- Peru (4)
- Uruguay (1)
- Venezuela (4)

== Results ==
=== Men's 10 km ===
| Rank | Name | Nationality | Time |
|---|---|---|---|
| 1st place, gold medalist(s) | Matheus Melecchi | Brazil | 1:47:53.5 |
| 2nd place, silver medalist(s) | David Farinango | Ecuador | 1:47:57.2 |
| 3rd place, bronze medalist(s) | Victor Rodrigues | Brazil | 1:48:04.1 |
| 4 | Ivo Cassini | Argentina | 1:48:25.6 |
| 5 | Joaquín Moreno | Argentina | 1:49:04.7 |
| 6 | Ronaldo Zambrano | Venezuela | 1:49:38.5 |
| 7 | Diego Vera | Venezuela | 1:51:15.5 |
| 8 | Rodrigo Ruiz | Peru | 1:54:59.6 |
| 9 | Piero Canduelas | Peru | 1:55:00.1 |
| 10 | Daniel Quaas | Chile | 1:58:18.8 |
| 11 | Matías Romero | Bolivia | 2:01:06.2 |
| 12 | Santiago Castedo | Bolivia | 2:03:27.1 |
| | Benjamín Insfran | Paraguay | OTL |
| | Joaquín Estigarribia | Paraguay | DNF |

=== Women's 10 km ===
| Rank | Name | Nationality | Time |
|---|---|---|---|
| 1st place, gold medalist(s) | Ana Marcela Cunha | Brazil | 1:56:58.2 |
| 2nd place, silver medalist(s) | Viviane Jungblut | Brazil | 1:57:01.9 |
| 3rd place, bronze medalist(s) | Romina Imwinkelried | Argentina | 1:57:04.5 |
| 4 | Candela Giordanino | Argentina | 1:57:04.6 |
| 5 | Victoria Abad | Ecuador | 1:57:41.6 |
| 6 | Paola Pérez | Venezuela | 1:58:29.0 |
| 7 | Danna Martínez | Ecuador | 2:04:36.5 |
| 8 | Eloisa Godoy | Chile | 2:07:27.9 |
| 9 | Fiorella Rodríguez | Chile | 2:07:28.6 |
| 10 | Celeste Contreras | Peru | 2:07:58.2 |
| 11 | Pilar Cañedo | Uruguay | 2:09:16.4 |
| 12 | Daniela Suárez | Venezuela | 2:09:18.9 |
| 13 | Cielo Peralta | Paraguay | 2:13:24.4 |
| | Cecilia Piraino | Paraguay | OTL |
| | Loreley Daleney | Bolivia | OTL |
| | Carolina Quiroga | Bolivia | OTL |
