= 2025 Pan American Aquatics Championships =

1st edition of Pan American Aquatics Championships

1st Pan American Aquatics Championships
- Host city: Medellín, Colombia
- Date: May 13–25, 2025
- Venue(s): César Zapata Aquatic Complex; Peñol-Guatapé Reservoir
- Nations: 45
- Events: 205
- Website: PanAm Aquatics

The 1st Pan American Aquatics Championships, organized by PanAm Aquatics, were held from May 13 to 25, 2025, in Medellín, Colombia, being the inaugural edition of the championships.

All events were held within the César Zapata Aquatic Complex, except the open water swimming events, which took place at the Peñol-Guatapé Reservoir. It served as a qualifying event for the 2025 World Aquatics Championships, the 2025 Junior Pan American Games, the World Aquatics Junior Swimming Championships and the World Aquatics U20 Water Polo Championships.

== Participating nations ==
The following delegations participated:

- Argentina (50)
- Aruba (11)
- Bolivia (4)
- Brazil (63)
- Canada (53)
- Chile (47)
- Colombia (81)
- Costa Rica (75)
- Cuba (18)
- Curaçao (10)
- Dominica (1)
- Dominican Republic (19)
- Ecuador (37)
- El Salvador (8)
- Guatemala (40)
- Guyana (2)
- Haiti (5)
- Honduras (54)
- Jamaica (14)
- Mexico (121)
- Nicaragua (4)
- Panama (17)
- Paraguay (1)
- Peru (112)
- Puerto Rico (52)
- Saint Kitts and Nevis (1)
- Saint Lucia (3)
- United States (64)
- U.S. Virgin Islands ()6
- Uruguay (11)
- Venezuela (43)

== Medal table ==
* Host nation (Colombia)

Rank	Nation	Gold	Silver	Bronze	Total
1	Mexico	51	47	25	123
2	Colombia*	46	18	20	84
3	Peru	21	16	16	53
4	United States	10	3	6	19
5	Ecuador	9	9	13	31
6	Canada	9	8	10	27
7	Guatemala	8	15	9	32
8	Argentina	8	9	6	23
9	Venezuela	7	17	11	35
10	Puerto Rico	6	9	3	18
11	Dominican Republic	6	4	2	12
12	Chile	5	5	6	16
13	Guyana	4	0	0	4
14	Honduras	3	5	15	23
15	Uruguay	3	0	1	4
16	Brazil	2	8	7	17
17	Costa Rica	2	6	10	18
18	Cuba	2	4	4	10
19	Aruba	2	1	7	10
20	U.S. Virgin Islands	1	3	1	5
21	El Salvador	1	2	1	4
22	Jamaica	0	3	5	8
23	Curaçao	0	1	2	3
23	Haiti	0	1	2	3
25	Nicaragua	0	0	4	4
26	Saint Lucia	0	0	1	1
Totals (26 entries)		206	194	187	587

== Results ==
=== Artistic swimming ===
==== Men's events ====
Event	Gold		Silver		Bronze
Solo U-12	Ethan Hu Yu (USA)	146.9354	Not awarded		Not awarded
Solo Youth	Logan Waldron (USA)	118.8233	Not awarded		Not awarded
Solo Free Senior	Kevin García (GUA)	100.7238	Victor Acevedo (MEX)	97.8550	Not awarded
Solo Free Junior	Abner Monter (MEX)	154.8463	Yaqil Alberto (CUR)	99.2850	Not awarded
Solo Tech Senior	Victor Acevedo (MEX)	159.7417	Kevin García (GUA)	107.1750	Not awarded
Solo Free Junior	Nicolás Campos (CHI)	210.9433	Abner Monter (MEX)	187.6083	Not awarded

==== Women's events ====
Event	Gold		Silver		Bronze	
Duet U-12	Mexico; Keren Estrada; Constanza Albornoz	148.7388	Peru; Micaela Romero; Sophia Silva	98.2812	Aruba; Kaylie Eman; Zaria Wester	88.1684
Duet Youth	United States; Yilian Yuan; Jaclyn Zhuge	168.7600	Mexico; Ivanna Peralta; Mía Quintero	125.8983	Curaçao; Dellany Prieto; Ziva King	109.0471
Free Duet Senior	Colombia; Sara Castañeda; Melisa Ceballos	184.6967	Peru; María Ccoyllo; Lia Luna	176.3825	Uruguay; Agustina Medina; Lucía Ververis	159.9900
Free Duet Junior	Canada; Aurora Chernoff; Olena Verbinska	204.4866	Mexico; Camila Argumedo; Daniela Ávila	195.5184	Chile; Chloe Plaut; Macarena Vial	189.2213
Technical Duet Senior	Colombia; Melisa Ceballos; Estefanía Roa	242.7492	Canada; Coralie Pelletier; Ariane Harvey	230.7717	Peru; María Ccoyllo; Lia Luna	226.8491
Technical Duet Junior	Mexico; Camila Argumedo; Daniela Ávila	254.0017	Brazil; Ana Almeida; Mariana Postal	235.7234	Canada; Charlie Breault; Olena Verbinska	224.5283
Solo U-12	Elizabeth Rakitina (USA)	149.6292	Constanza Albornoz Valdes (MEX)	143.7771	Micaela Romero Morales (PER)	134.3104
Solo Youth	Jaclyn Zhuge (USA)	202.7400	Bernier Emilie (CAN)	185.6633	Valentina Rivera (PER)	138.2300
Solo Free Senior	Kyra Hoevertsz (ARU)	203.0400	Mona Schwichert (USA)	197.3000	Ariana Coronado (PER)	178.2150
Solo Free Junior	Nayeli Mondragon (MEX)	190.8638	Lily Bernier (CAN)	186.8088	Alessia Rosso (USA)	169.3355
Solo Tech Senior	Kyra Hoevertsz (ARU)	227.3800	Mona Schwickert (USA)	209.0183	Coralie Pelletier (CAN)	207.6025
Solo Tech Junior	Nayeli Mondragon (MEX)	222.8333	Andrea Escobar (CAN)	215.7608	Emily Robinson (USA)	194.7750

==== Mixed events ====
Event	Gold		Silver		Bronze	
Free Combinations U-12	Peru; Domenika de la Mata; Elena Ubarnes; María Antonella Espinoza; Micaela Romero; Natsumi Zavaleta; Nehira Barrantes; Pia Dongo; Sophia Silva	147.6234	Not awarded		Not awarded	
Free Combinations Youth	United States; Annie Xiang; Chloe Kim; Dagny Hwang; Ella Wu; Geneveive Thiebaut; Jaclyn Zhuge; Logan Waldron; Nira Shakeri; Olivia Zeng; Xinqi Megan Xu; Yilian Yuan	232.2104	Peru; Aiyana Carpio; Luana Abad; Alessandra Guarniz; Luciana Pérez; Mariafe Marin; Mikaela Peña; Rafaella Pérez; Tamina Arizaca; Valentina Rivera	157.5402	Not awarded	
Free Duet Senior	Guatemala; Kevin García; Rebeca Urías	177.3054	Not awarded		Not awarded	
Free Duet Junior	Chile; Nicolás Campos; Theodora Garrido	238.0891	Colombia; Juan Coronel; Laura Rodríguez	190.5259	Canada; Nathan Hantong; Isabelle Koptie	162.7262
Mixed Duet Youth	United States; Logan Waldron; Yilian Yuan	165.2438	Not awarded		Not awarded	
Technical Duet Senior	Guatemala; Kevin García; Rebeca Urías	141.2567	Not awarded		Not awarded	
Technical Duet Junior	Chile; Nicolás Campos; Theodora Garrido	199.0083	Colombia; Juan Coronel; Laura Rodríguez	169.6866	Brazil; Bernardo Barreto; Hannah Sukman	145.7566
Team U-12	Mexico; Ana Paula Retiz; Ana Flores Quintero; Ariadna Ramírez; Monserrat Sánchez; Montseraat Bernal; Natalia Lora; Vanya Brito; Ximena Ramírez	136.1175	Peru; Aitana Pérez; Annie Drago; Aracely Huaman; Ariana Guarniz; Ariana Villanueva; Daniela Bautista; Danna Bravo; Gianella Llamosas; María Cristina Becerra; Steffi Tapia	107.6746	Not awarded	
Team Youth	United States; Annie Xiang; Chloe Kim; Dagny Hwang; Ella Wu; Geneveive Thiebaut; Jaclyn Zhuge; Nira Shakeri; Olivia Zeng; Xinqi Xu; Yilian Yuan	207.7992	Peru; Alessandra Guarniz; Luana Abad; Mariafe Marin; Mikaela Peña; Rafaella Perez; Tamina Arizaca; Valentina Rivera	129.3288	Curaçao; Dellany Almendariz; Kimora-Lee Balentien; Nazya Cova; Queydi Van Bemmelen; Raeza Feliz; Ziva King	87.3896
Free Team Senior	Uruguay; Agustina Medina; Ines Cabral; Josefina Paris; Julieta Oberi; Lucía Perez; Lucia Ververis; Maite Alvarez; Martina Da Cunda; Martina Maisonaba; Sabrina Tosi	167.5730	Not awarded		Not awarded	
Free Team Junior	Mexico; Aurora Delgado; Camila Argumedo; Carolina Arzate; Citlali Nuño; Daniela Avila; Fernanda Carmona; Jaqueline Melendez; Nayeli Mondragon; Victoria Delgado	246.7350	Chile; Abi Armijo; Barbara Coppelli; Chloe Plaut; Dominga Cerda; Dominga Cesped; Eva Rubio; Macarena Vial; Nicolas Campos; Theodora Garrido	217.9439	Colombia; Aileen Velez; Danna Acosta; Juan Coronel; Laura Rodriguez; Luisa Botero; Mabel Tobon; Maria Paramo; Monica Arevalo; Natalia Jurado; Valerie Cuenca	205.2920
Tech Team Senior	Uruguay; Agustina Medina; Ines Cabral; Josefina Paris; Julieta Oberi; Lucía María Perez; Lucia Ververis; Maite Alvarez; Sabrina Tosi	146.0716	Not awarded		Not awarded	
Tech Team Junior	Mexico; Aurora Delgado; Camila Argumedo; Carolina Arzate; Citlali Nuño; Daniela Avila; Fernanda Carmona; Jaqueline Melendez; Nayeli Mondragon; Victoria Delgado	242.1517	Brazil; Alice Guimarães; Ana Dos Santos Almeida; Bernardo Da Silva Barreto; Eduarda De Lima Chagas; Hannah Rothstein; Isabella Lima; Julia Coelho; Manuela Marques; Maria Huber; Marina Postal	214.3259	Colombia; Aileen Velez; Danna Acosta; Juan Coronel; Laura Rodriguez; Luisa Botero; Mabel Tobon; Maria Paramo; Monica Arevalo; Natalia Jurado; Valerie Cuenca	211.2109
Figures U-12	Keren Estrada (MEX)	62.7917	Constanza Albornoz (MEX)	61.7917	Ethan Hu Yu (USA)	60.8333
Figures Youth	Jaclyn Zhuge (USA)	81.8030	Olivia Zeng (USA)	81.0379	Logan Waldron (USA)	79.9167
Acrobatic Routine Senior	Uruguay; Agustina Medina; Ines Cabral; Josefina Paris; Julieta Oberi; Lucía Perez; Lucia Ververis; Maite Alvarez; Martina Da Cunda; Martina Maisonaba; Sabrina Tosi	129.1720	Not awarded		Not awarded	
Acrobatic Routine Junior	Mexico; Aurora Delgado; Camila Argumedo; Carolina Arzate; Citlali Nuño; Daniela Avila; Fernanda Carmona; Jaqueline Melendez; Nayeli Mondragon; Victoria Delgado	175.2738	Brazil; Alice Guimarães; Ana Dos Santos Almeida; Bernardo Da Silva Barreto; Eduarda De Lima Chagas; Hannah Sukman; Isabella Viana; Julia Coelho; Manuela Marques; Maria Huber; Marina Postal	154.0433	Chile; Abi Armijo; Barbara Coppelli; Chloe Plaut; Dominga Cerda; Dominga Cesped; Eva Rubio; Macarena Vial; Nicolas Campos; Theodora Garrido	149.6600

=== Diving ===
==== Men's events ====
Event	Gold		Silver		Bronze	
Platform Open	Carlos Ramos (CUB)	448.30	Emilio Treviño (MEX)	387.00	Kenny Zamudio (MEX)	377.80
Platform 16-18	Samuel Talbot (CAN)	451.40	Carlos Solorzano (MEX)	447.90	Kash Tarasoff (CAN)	445.50
Platform 14-15	Mateo Nolasco (MEX)	362.15	Ian Nava (MEX)	361.70	Chase Shaw (CAN)	346.70
Platform 13 and Under	Máximo Teran (MEX)	328.35	Iñaki Hernández (MEX)	316.30	Luiz Roncone (BRA)	285.50
10m Platform Synchro Open	Mexico; Kenny Zamudio; Edgar Cortez	371.40	Cuba; Carlos Ramos; Bernaldo Arias	353.13	Venezuela; Juan Travieso; Jesus González	322.08
1m Springboard Open	Thomas Ciprick (CAN)	352.05	Jesús González (VEN)	343.05	Simón Rios Zapata (COL)	327.90
1m Springboard 16-18	David Vazquez (MEX)	467.90	Miguel Tovar (COL)	463.80	Carlos Solorzano (MEX)	452.15
1m Springboard 14-15	Ian Nava (MEX)	366.90	Alexis Aguero (MEX)	335.25	Mateo Nolasco (MEX)	317.60
1m Springboard 13 and Under	Máximo Teran (MEX)	298.10	Iñaki Hernández (MEX)	297.70	Luiz Roncone (BRA)	241.00
3m Springboard Open	Frank Rosales (CUB)	426.55	Jesús González (VEN)	351.05	David Vazquez (MEX)	346.30
3m Springboard 16-18	David Vazquez (MEX)	463.90	Carlos Solorzano (MEX)	453.60	Arnaud Corbeil (CAN)	433.75
3m Springboard 14-15	Ian Nava (MEX)	440.65	Alexis Aguero (MEX)	375.95	Mateo Nolasco (MEX)	375.05
3m Springboard 13 and Under	Iñaki Hernández (MEX)	312.30	Máximo Teran (MEX)	311.85	Luiz Roncone (BRA)	244.80
3m Springboard Synchro Open	Mexico; David Vazquez; Jesús Agundez	379.74	Colombia; Tomás Tamayo; Miguel Tovar	352.29	Venezuela; Juan Travieso; Jesus González	335.25

==== Women's events ====
Event	Gold		Silver		Bronze	
Platform Open	Suri Cueva (MEX)	286.30	María José Sánchez (MEX)	283.85	Lila Gokiert (CAN)	274.05
Platform 16-18	Lila Gokiert (CAN)	381.75	Suri Cueva (MEX)	346.05	Kelly Mejorada (MEX)	343.40
Platform 14-15	Abigail González (MEX)	305.35	Daniela Durevska (CAN)	292.60	Ludmila Da Silva Lacerda (BRA)	264.00
Platform 13 and Under	Sara-Jade Tessier (CAN)	271.80	Romina Cano (MEX)	262.30	Maia Jane (CAN)	236.75
10m Platform Synchro Open	Mexico; Rut Paez; Abigail González	282.96	Cuba; Anais Negret; Cynthia Cortina	153.45	Not awarded	
1m Springboard Open	Lia Cueva (MEX)	257.00	Mia Cueva (MEX)	235.15	Ana Monrroy (MEX)	225.90
1m Springboard 16-18	Suri Cueva (MEX)	370.35	Kelly Mejorada (MEX)	358.75	Hannia García (MEX)	323.25
1m Springboard 14-15	Mia Cueva (MEX)	329.95	Lia Cueva (MEX)	324.25	Daniela Durevska (CAN)	278.85
1m Springboard 13 and Under	Sara-Jade Tessier (CAN)	259.20	Maia Jane (CAN)	249.60	Romina Lira (MEX)	222.15
3m Springboard Open	Mia Cueva (MEX)	284.50	Zyanya Parra (MEX)	273.30	Lia Cueva (MEX)	266.45
3m Springboard 16-18	Lila Stewart (CAN)	396.80	Zyanya Parra (MEX)	379.90	Kelly Mejorada (MEX)	379.25
3m Springboard 14-15	Lia Cueva (MEX)	356.60	Mia Cueva (MEX)	355.10	Daniela Durevska (CAN)	329.00
3m Springboard 13 and Under	Sara-Jade Tessier (CAN)	265.35	Maia Jane (CAN)	259.65	Luciana Pinedo (COL)	242.70
3m Platform Synchro Open	Mexico; Lia Cueva; Mia Cueva	272.34	Brazil; Heloá Almeida; Maria Postiglione	180.36	Cuba; Martha Castañeda; Cynthia Cortina	226.44

==== Mixed events ====
Event	Gold		Silver		Bronze	
Teams Open	Mexico; David Vazquez; Kenny Zamudio; Mia Cueva; Suri Cueva	375.30	Colombia; Gabriela Rusinque; Juan Segura; Mariana Osorio; Miguel Tovar	321.25	United States; Abigail Baxter; Joshua Thai; Mary Kate Cavanaugh	319.40

=== Open water swimming ===
==== Men's events ====
Event	Gold		Silver		Bronze	
10 km 20-22	Matheus Melecchi (BRA)	2:00:59	Luiz Loureiro (BRA)	2:01:57	Freddy Arevalo (COL)	2:07:01
10 km 18-19	Paulo Strehlke (MEX)	2:00:51	Leonardo De Macedo (BRA)	2:01:01	Arthur Britto (BRA)	2:02:34
7.5 km 17-16	José Antonio Barrios (GUA)	1:36:40	Emmanuel López (MEX)	1:37:21	Roberto Barzallo (ECU)	1:37:26
5 km 14-15	Santiago Martínez (MEX)	1:05:04	Braulio Martell (PER)	1:05:36	Kevin Sandoval (COL)	1:07:40
3 km 12-13	Iker Galindo (MEX)	39:45	Miguel Ortega (MEX)	40:12	Alexis Almazan (MEX)	40:55
Relay 2x1500 Open	Peru; Adrián Ywanaga; Rodrigo Ruiz	35:34	Mexico; Armando Díaz; Emmanuel López	35:44	Ecuador; Ariel Torres; Jhenry López	35:50

==== Women's events ====
Event	Gold		Silver		Bronze	
10 km 20-22	Cibelle Jungblut (BRA)	2:14:20	Candela Giordanino (ARG)	2:14:22	Paulina Hernández (MEX)	2:14:34
10 km 18-19	Danna Martínez (ECU)	2:15:24	Lizian Sobral (BRA)	2:15:30	Regina Cuevas (MEX)	2:22:19
7.5 km 17-16	Sofía Garces (ARG)	1:43:57	Karen Coello (ECU)	1:43:58	Regina Medina (MEX)	1:46:25
5 km 14-15	Ana Martínez (MEX)	1:12:06	Sara Martínez (MEX)	1:12:15	Fiorella Rodríguez (PER)	1:12:21
3 km 12-13	Amaia Cruz (MEX)	42:17	Sofía Bravo (ECU)	43:18	Kiara Santillán (PER)	43:33
Relay 2x1500 Open	Ecuador; Ana Abad; Luciana Piechestein	39:02	Puerto Rico; Emma Guglielmello; Ilenis Pérez	39:56	Mexico; Camila Nieves; Regina Medina	40:10

==== Mixed events ====
Event	Gold		Silver		Bronze	
Relay 2x1500 Open	Argentina; Benjamín Mello; Sofía Garces	37:45	Venezuela; Nathalie Medina; Sergio Ybarra	38:51	Ecuador; Maximo Granda; Paula Guevara	38:56
Relay 4x1500 Open	Ecuador; Danna Martínez; Juan Alcivar; Juan Aguirre; Karen Coello	1:13:10	Argentina; Candela Giordanino; Ignacio Stambuk; Martina Contreras Giorgio; Tomás Rodríguez	1:13:11	Colombia; Freddy Arevalo; Jairo Moreno; María Posso; Tiffanny Murillo	1:14:37

=== Swimming ===
==== Men's events ====
Event	Gold		Silver		Bronze	
50 m backstroke 13-15	Nicolás Lacharme (COL)	29.24	Carlos Díaz (PER)	29.29	Jayden Wen Hu Xu (LCA)	29.37
50 m backstroke 16-18	Carlos Moreno (MEX)	26.33	Edhy Vargas (CHI)	26.82	Erick Blandon (NCA)	27.03
50 m backstroke 19-22	Gabriel Arias (COL)	26.65	Manuel Díaz (VEN)	26.86	Siul Ayala (PUR)	27.73
100 m backstroke 13-15	Nicolás Lacharme (COL)	1:03.60	Felipe Alvarez (HON)	1:03.91	Rhys Hunter (JAM)	1:04.78
100 m backstroke 16-18	Carlos Moreno (MEX)	56.79	Edhy Vargas (CHI)	57.00	César Paredes (VEN)	58.77
100 m backstroke 19-22	Raekwon Noel (GUY)	56.78	Gabriel Arias (COL)	57.04	Siul Ayala (PUR)	59.27
200 m backstroke 13-15	Caleb Ramirez (HON)	2:17.40	Nicolás Lacharme (COL)	2:18.54	Felipe Alvarez (HON)	2:20.75
200 m backstroke 16-18	Edhy Vargas (CHI)	2:04.40	Carlos Moreno (MEX)	2:06.54	Cesar Paredes (VEN)	2:08.88
200 m backstroke 19-22	Gabriel Arias (COL)	2:09.19	Siul Ayala (PUR)	2:10.54	Guido Montero (CRC)	2:12.95
50 m breaststroke 13-15	Matías Flores (MEX)	31.21	Santiago Unda (MEX)	31.28	Jerónimo Ochoa (COL)	31.65
50 m breaststroke 16-18	Pablo Solano (DOM)	29.79	Mariano Sánchez (PER)	29.89	Guillermo Dring (MEX)	29.95
50 m breaststroke 19-22	Xavier Ruiz (PUR)	28.28	Collin Mckenzie (JAM)	28.75	Bransly Driksz (ARU)	29.17
100 m breaststroke 13-15	Santiago Unda (MEX)	1:07.95	Josué Sánchez (HON)	1:08.89	Ismael Escalante (PER)	1:09.17
100 m breaststroke 16-18	Mariano Sánchez (PER)	1:04.44	Guillermo Dring (MEX)	1:04.63	Juan León (ECU)	1:04.68
100 m breaststroke 19-22	Xavier Ruiz (PUR)	1:01.18	Collin Mckenzie (JAM)	1:02.23	Juan José Giraldo (COL)	1:02.31
200 m breaststroke 13-15	Ismael Escalante (PER)	2:34.22	Juan Juárez (GUA)	2:34.66	Jerónimo Ochoa (COL)	2:34.97
200 m breaststroke 16-18	Guillermo Dring (MEX)	2:21.10	Pablo Solano (DOM)	2:23.71	Mariano Gómez (PER)	2:25.98
200 m breaststroke 19-22	Xavier Ruiz (PUR)	2:13.43	Juan José Giraldo (COL)	2:15.62	Collin Mckenzie (JAM)	2:22.21
50 m butterfly 13-15	Ian Maldonado (COL)	26.05	Carlos Díaz (PER)	26.32	Santiago Unda (MEX)	26.81
50 m butterfly 16-18	Emiliano Calle (COL)	24.31	Javier Nunez (DOM)	24.47	Frank Solano (COL)	24.74
50 m butterfly 19-22	Manuel Díaz (VEN)	25.00	Andrés Brooks (PUR)	25.11	Gerald Hernández (NCA)	25.16
100 m butterfly 13-15	Ian Maldonado (COL)	57.12	Santiago Unda (MEX)	57.92	Carlos Díaz (PER)	58.48
100 m butterfly 16-18	Javier Nunez (DOM)	54.25	Emiliano Calle (COL)	54.54	Christian Vladimir (HAI)	55.23
100 m butterfly 19-22	Raekwon Noel (GUY)	54.00	Manuel Díaz (VEN)	54.27	Andrés Brooks (PUR)	54.52
200 m butterfly 13-15	Vincenzo Obreros (PER)	2:13.74	Santiago Unda (MEX)	2:15.05	Felipe Alvarez (HON)	2:17.76
200 m butterfly 16-18	Edhy Vargas (CHI)	2:04.04	Rodrigo Ventura (ESA)	2:04.52	César Paredes (VEN)	2:07.57
200 m butterfly 19-22	Raekwon Noel (GUY)	2:02.52	Andrés Brooks (PUR)	2:04.04	Mark Van Eybergen (MEX)	2:05.69
50 m freestyle 13-15	Ian Maldonado (COL)	24.58	Matías Flores (MEX)	24.86	Carlos Díaz (PER)	24.91
50 m freestyle 16-18	Frank Solano (COL)	22.90	Javier Nunez (DOM)	23.02	Erick Blandon (NCA)	23.46
50 m freestyle 19-22	Cristian Ramos (DOM)	23.26	Raphael Grand'pierre (HAI)	23.32	Juan Blandon (COL)	23.58
100 m freestyle 13-15	Javier Meza (MEX)	55.06	Matías Flores (MEX)	55.12	Luis Vega (CRC)	56.27
100 m freestyle 16-18	Javier Nunez (DOM)	50.44	Frank Solano (COL)	50.69	Dennis Pérez (VEN)	51.06
100 m freestyle 19-22	Santiago Arteaga (COL)	51.43	Francisco Montaño (VEN)	51.78	Santino Mina (ARG)	51.87
200 m freestyle 13-15	Andrés Rojas (CRC)	1:59.42	Luis Vega (CRC)	2:00.39	Javier Meza (MEX)	2:00.80
200 m freestyle 16-18	Dennis Pérez (VEN)	1:54.95	Inald Fernandes (ARU)	1:56.86	Christian Jerome (HAI)	1:57.33
200 m freestyle 19-22	Sebastián Muñoz (COL)	1:52.62	Mark Van Eybergen (MEX)	1:53.31	Santino Mina (ARG)	1:54.05
400 m freestyle 13-15	Matías Ramírez (COL)	4:13.39	Andrés Rojas (CRC)	4:13.89	Santiago Noriega (GUA)	4:15.68
400 m freestyle 16-18	Rodrigo Ventura (ESA)	4:08.88	Domenico Sotomayor (PER)	4:10.49	José Antonio Barrios (GUA)	4:11.11
400 m freestyle 19-22	Raekwon Noel (GUY)	4:00.66	Mark Van Eybergen (MEX)	4:01.44	Sebastián Muñoz (COL)	4:03.74
800 m freestyle 13-15	Josue Matute (HON)	8:49.00	Matías Ramírez (COL)	8:49.29	Andrés Rojas (CRC)	8:55.84
800 m freestyle 16-18	Domenico Sotomayor (PER)	8:39.13	José Antonio Barrios (GUA)	8:43.23	Rodrigo Ventura (ESA)	8:47.76
800 m freestyle 19-22	Adrián Ywanaga (PER)	8:25.56	Sergio Ybarra (VEN)	8:30.94	Mark Van Eybergen (MEX)	8:31.78
1500 m freestyle 13-15	Josue Matute (HON)	17:02.93	Matías Ramírez (COL)	17:03.44	Santiago Noriega (GUA)	17:05.50
1500 m freestyle 16-18	Domenico Sotomayor (PER)	16:44.98	José Antonio Barrios (GUA)	16:52.50	Ariel Delgado (CRC)	16:57.94
1500 m freestyle 19-22	Mark Van Eybergen (MEX)	16:12.39	Sergio Ybarra (VEN)	16:24.09	Adrián Ywanga (PER)	16:28.86
200 m combined 13-15	Santiago Unda (MEX)	2:16.41	Caleb Ramirez (HON)	2:16.93	Vincenzo Obreros (PER)	2:18.63
200 m combined 16-18	Mariano Gómez (PER)	2:09.89	Guillermo Dring (MEX)	2:11.43	Pedro Aguilera (CHI)	2:11.94
200 m combined 19-22	Xavier Ruiz (PUR)	2:03.83	Andrés Brooks (PUR)	2:06.05	Manuel Díaz (VEN)	2:09.21
400 m combined 13-15	Vincenzo Obreros (PER)	5:04.77	Juan Juárez (GUA)	5:09.50	Nicolás Lacharme (COL)	5:10.14
400 m combined 16-18	César Paredes (VEN)	4:41.53	Guillermo Dring (MEX)	4:45.32	Luca D'Angelo (ARG)	4:47.96
400 m combined 19-22	Xavier Ruiz (PUR)	4:32.51	Matías Tapia (ECU)	4:46.73	Martín Alvarez (ECU)	4:49.53
4x100 m freestyle relay 13-15	Colombia; Ian Maldonado; Matías Ramirez; Nicolás Lacharme; Samuel Reyes	3:42.09	Mexico; Javier Meza; Matías Flores; Maximiliano Torres; Santiago Unda	3:45.39	Honduras; Caleb Ramírez; César Ramos; Felipe Alvarez; Josue Matute	3:51.75
4x100 m freestyle relay 16-18	Peru; Andrés Peche; Domenico Sotomayor; Mariano Sánchez; Vicente Flores	3:38.39	Guatemala; Cristián García; Diego Rodriguez; José Antonio Barrios; Roberto Gossmann	3:39.34	Argentina; Benjamín Mello; Laureano Hopmeier; Lautaro Troncoso Krapp; Luca D'Angelo	3:41.91
4x100 m freestyle relay 19-22	Colombia; Juan Blandon; Juan Giraldo; Santiago Arteaga; Sebastián Muñoz	3:20.24	Ecuador; Giovanny Pesantes; Luis Jimenez; Martín Alvarez; Matías Tapia	3:38.99	Honduras; Jaime Uribe; Jaime Valenzuela; Joaquín Maldonado; Luis Varela	4:03.02
4x200 m freestyle relay 13-15	Colombia; Ian Maldonado; Matías Ramirez; Nicolás Lacharme; Samuel Reyes	8:19.51	Mexico; Javier Meza; Matías Flores; Maximiliano Torres; Santiago Unda	8:24.24	Honduras; Caleb Ramírez; César Ramos; Felipe Alvarez; Josue Matute	8:33.34
4x200 m freestyle relay 16-18	Argentina; Benjamín Mello; Laureano Hopmeier; Lautaro Troncoso; Luca D'Angelo	8:03.44	Peru; Andrés Peche; Domenico Sotomayor; Mariano Sánchez; Vicente Flores	8:05.96	Ecuador; Fausto Guerrero; Juan León; Mario Granizo; Mauricio Gómez	8:21.09
4x200 m freestyle relay 19-22	Colombia; Juan Blandon; Juan Giraldo; Santiago Arteaga; Sebastián Muñoz	7:45.76	Ecuador; Giovanny Pesantes; Luis Jimenez; Martín Alvarez; Matías Tapia	8:02.26	Honduras; Jaime Uribe; Jaime Valenzuela; Joaquín Maldonado; Luis Varela	9:15.12
4x200 m combined relay 13-15	Colombia; Ian Maldonado; Matías Ramirez; Nicolás Lacharme; Samuel Reyes	4:05.21	Mexico; Javier Meza; Matías Flores; Maximiliano Torres; Santiago Unda	4:13.27	Honduras; Caleb Ramírez; César Ramos; Felipe Alvarez; Josue Matute	4:15.62
4x200 m combined relay 16-18	Ecuador; Fausto Guerrero; Juan León; Mario Granizo; Mauricio Gómez	4:00.05	Argentina; Benjamín Mello; Laureano Hopmeier; Lautaro Troncoso; Luca D'Angelo	4:03.65	Peru; Andrés Peche; Domenico Sotomayor; Mariano Sánchez; Vicente Flores	4:04.20
4x200 m combined relay 19-22	Colombia; Juan Blandon; Juan Giraldo; Santiago Arteaga; Sebastián Muñoz	3:48.62	Ecuador; Giovanny Pesantes; Luis Jimenez; Martín Alvarez; Matías Tapia	4:06.33	Honduras; Jaime Uribe; Jaime Valenzuela; Joaquín Maldonado; Luis Varela	4:35.95

==== Women's events ====
Event	Gold		Silver		Bronze	
50 m backstroke 13-15	Cielo Moya (PER)	31.08	Aurora Arauz (CRC)	31.93	María Gabriela Becerra (COL)	32.56
50 m backstroke 16-18	Melissa Diego (GUA)	29.94	Martina Roper (CHI)	31.07	Sophia Zapata (NCA)	31.41
50 m backstroke 19-22	Elizabeth Jiménez (DOM)	29.80	Juana Ortiz (ARG)	29.89	María Daniela Contreras (ECU)	29.98 NR
100 m backstroke 13-15	Cielo Moya (PER)	1:06.00	María Gabriela Becerra (COL)	1:09.69	Luciana Landázuri (ECU)	1:10.92
100 m backstroke 16-18	Melissa Diego (GUA)	1:03.08	Mónica Leydar (VEN)	1:05.60	Eva Andrade (ECU)	1:05.67
100 m backstroke 19-22	Elizabeth Jiménez (DOM)	1:03.66	Laurent Estrada (CUB)	1:04.07	María Daniela Contreras (ECU)	1:04.32 NR
200 m backstroke 13-15	María Gabriela Becerra (COL)	2:29.90	Deborah Umaña (CRC)	2:31.90	Angeles Quispe (PER)	2:33.16
200 m backstroke 16-18	Melissa Diego (GUA)	2:18.57	Mónica Leydar (VEN)	2:22.03	Isabella Budnik (COL)	2:23.74
200 m backstroke 19-22	María Daniela Contreras (ECU)	2:19.03	Elizabeth Jiménez (DOM)	2:21.00	Laurent Estrada (CUB)	2:22.30
50 m breaststroke 13-15	Isabella López (COL)	34.59	Lisbeth Alvarado (GUA)	35.09	Kia Alert (JAM)	35.37
50 m breaststroke 16-18	Sara González (VEN)	34.67	Valeska Betancourt (VEN)	34.77	Alejandra Alvarado (GUA)	34.94
50 m breaststroke 19-22	Stefania Gómez (COL)	31.36	Andrea Perea (PUR)	33.99	Marayah Tromp (ARU)	34.12
100 m breaststroke 13-15	Isabella López (COL)	1:14.56	Elisa Pérez (MEX)	1:17.61	Kia Alert (JAM)	1:17.85
100 m breaststroke 16-18	Sara González (VEN)	1:14.85	Micaela Mazzari (CRC)	1:15.85	Fernanda Pérez (CHI)	1:16.29
100 m breaststroke 19-22	Stefania Gómez (COL)	1:09.67	Andrea Perea (PUR)	1:15.36	Sairy Escalante (HON)	1:19.13
200 m breaststroke 13-15	Isabella López (COL)	2:44.10	Elisa Pérez (MEX)	2:51.50	Lisbeth Alvarado (GUA)	2:52.33
200 m breaststroke 16-18	Micaela Mazzari (CRC)	2:43.93	Fernanda Pérez (CHI)	2:46.58	Montserrat Torres (CRC)	2:47.52
200 m breaststroke 19-22	Stefania Gómez (COL)	2:39.94	Andrea Perea (PUR)	2:42.64	Marayah Tromp (ARU)	2:54.00
50 m butterfly 13-15	Cielo Quispe (PER)	27.37	Kia Alert (JAM)	29.46	Reagan Uszenski (ISV)	29.83
50 m butterfly 16-18	Emma Sabando (ECU)	27.65	María Alejandra Santana (COL)	28.09	Sahara Monroy (MEX)	28.55
50 m butterfly 19-22	Iara Fernandez (ARG)	27.88	Isabella Bedoya (COL)	28.34	Fernanda Reyes (CHI)	29.27
100 m butterfly 13-15	Cielo Moya (PER)	1:03.43	Samantha Mendez (GUA)	1:07.77	Gabriela Campuzano (COL)	1:08.20
100 m butterfly 13-15	Cielo Moya (PER)	1:03.43	Samantha Mendez (GUA)	1:07.77	Francis Hernández (CRC)	1:08.20
100 m butterfly 16-18	Emma Sabando (ECU)	1:01.90	Yasmin Silva (PER)	1:02.16	Mónica Leydar (VEN)	1:02.58
100 m butterfly 19-22	Samantha Baños (COL)	1:01.45	Iara Fernández (ARG)	1:02.62	Laurent Estrada (CUB)	1:02.72
200 m butterfly 13-15	Angeles Quispe (PER)	2:27.79	Gabriela Campuzano (COL)	2:31.33	Samantha Mendez (GUA)	2:33.84
200 m butterfly 16-18	Yasmin Silva (PER)	2:14.58	Mónica Leydar (VEN)	2:18.76	Elvira Espinosa (ECU)	2:19.72
200 m butterfly 19-22	Samantha Baños (COL)	2:16.89	Yuritzi Salgado (MEX)	2:22.17	Francesca Rossi (ARG)	2:25.09
50 m freestyle 13-15	Cielo Moya (PER)	26.33	Reagan Uszenski (ISV)	27.19	Kia Alert (JAM)	27.51
50 m freestyle 16-18	María Alejandra Santana (COL)	26.67	Elena Amos (ESA)	26.94	Eva Andrade (ECU)	27.31
50 m freestyle 19-22	Isabella Bedoya (COL)	26.09	Iara Fernández (ARG)	26.80	Laurent Estrada (CUB)	26.98
100 m freestyle 13-15	Cielo Moya (PER)	58.43	Reagan Uszenski (ISV)	59.35	María Gabriela Becerra (COL)	1:00.90
100 m freestyle 16-18	María Alejandra Santana (COL)	57.92	Eva Andrade (ECU)	58.43	Anna Hernandez (VEN)	58.95
100 m freestyle 19-22	Isabella Bedoya (COL)	57.10	Laurent Estrada (CUB)	57.61	María Belen Morales (GUA)	58.80
200 m freestyle 13-15	Reagan Uszenski (ISV)	2:09.06	Isabela Matarrita (CRC)	2:10.37	Elizabeth Romano (MEX)	2:13.54
200 m freestyle 16-18	Tiffanny Murillo (COL)	2:03.93	Lia Espinosa (PER)	2:07.44	Eva Andrade (ECU)	2:07.60
200 m freestyle 19-22	Alanis Maceira (PUR)	2:07.00	María Belen Morales (GUA)	2:08.74	Nathalie Medina (VEN)	2:09.76
400 m freestyle 13-15	Yaretzi Lomelí (MEX)	4:32.88	Reagan Uszenski (ISV)	4:34.11	Isabela Matarrita (CRC)	4:36.80
400 m freestyle 16-18	Tiffanny Murillo (COL)	4:21.97	Elvira Espinosa (ECU)	4:31.31	Sofía Garces (ARG)	4:31.82
400 m freestyle 19-22	Yuritzi Salgado (MEX)	4:27.98	Nathalie Medina (VEN)	4:32.57	Britta Schwengle (ARU)	4:32.80
800 m freestyle 13-15	Yaretzi Lomelí (MEX)	9:31.25	Angeles Quispe (PER)	9:33.47	Isabela Matarrita (CRC)	9:36.66
800 m freestyle 16-18	Tiffanny Murillo (COL)	9:00.45	Sofía Garces (ARG)	9:17.55	Nicole Centeno (CRC)	9:28.48
800 m freestyle 19-22	Yuritzi Salgado (MEX)	9:06.94	Yanci Vanegas (GUA)	9:30.39	Britta Schwengle (ARU)	9:32.49
1500 m freestyle 13-15	Yaretzi García (MEX)	18:19.42	Erika Naranjo (COL)	18:42.31	Debbie Mejía (HON)	19:21.03
1500 m freestyle 16-18	Tiffanny Murillo (COL)	17:16.57	Sofía Garces (ARG)	17:33.77	Yuliana Ortiz (CRC)	17:55.86
1500 m freestyle 19-22	Turitzi Salgado (MEX)	17:35.20	Yanci Vanegas (GUA)	18:19.38	Britta Schwengle (ARU)	18:19.80
200 m combined 13-15	Elisa Pérez (MEX)	2:30.40	Lisbeth Alvarado (GUA)	2:32.42	Debbie Mejía (HON)	2:33.28
200 m combined 16-18	Nicole Christensen (VEN)	2:21.11	Mónica Leydar (VEN)	2:22.92	Melissa Diego (GUA)	2:24.29
200 m combined 19-22	Stefania Gomez (COL)	2:20.11	Francesca Rossi (ARG)	2:25.23	Fernanda Reyes (CHI)	2:28.25
400 m combined 13-15	Angeles Quispe (PER)	5:19.84	Elisa Pérez (MEX)	5:26.01	Yaretzi García (MEX)	5:31.25
400 m combined 16-18	Tiffanny Murillo (COL)	4:57.61	Mónica Leydar (VEN)	5:02.18	Nicole Christensen (VEN)	5:06.76
400 m combined 19-22	Francesca Rossi (ARG)	5:10.02	Yuritzi Salgado (MEX)	5:12.22	Samantha Baños (COL)	5:15.67
4x100 m freestyle relay 13-15	Colombia; Gabriela Campuzano; Isabella López; María Alejandra Agudelo; María Gabriela Becerra	4:09.38	Guatemala; Elissa Berganza; Linda de León; Lisbeth Alvarado; Samantha Méndez	4:14.83	Honduras; Debbie Mejía; Deborah Castillo; Francis Escobar; Mariabelen Fajardo	4:22.74
4x100 m freestyle relay 16-18	Ecuador; Ana Paula Morales; Elvira Espinosa; Emma Sabando; Eva Andrade	4:04.44	Guatemala; Alejandra Alvarado; Emilia Sandoval; Melissa Diego; Sara Fernández	4:13.41	Honduras; Camila Lobo; Diana Espinal; Valentina Aguilar; Violeta Portillo	4:32.82
4x100 m freestyle relay 19-22	Argentina; Dalma González; Francesca Rossi; Iara Fernández; Juana Ortiz	4:05.64	Not awarded		Not awarded	
4x200 m freestyle relay 13-15	Colombia; Gabriela Campuzano; Isabella López; María Alejandra Agudelo; María Gabriela Becerra	9:08.07	Honduras; Debbie Mejía; Deborah Castillo; Francis Escobar; Mariabelen Fajardo	9:39.16	Not awarded	
4x200 m freestyle relay 16-18	Ecuador; Ana Paula Morales; Elvira Espinosa; Emma Sabando; Eva Andrade	9:09.16	Guatemala; Alejandra Alvarado; Emilia Sandoval; Melissa Diego; Sara Fernández	9:14.19	Honduras; Camila Lobo; Diana Espinal; Valentina Aguilar; Violeta Portillo	10:06.03
4x200 m freestyle relay 19-22	Argentina; Dalma González; Francesca Rossi; Iara Fernández; Juana Ortiz	9:26.68	Not awarded		Not awarded	
4x100 m combined relay 13-15	Colombia; Gabriela Campuzano; Isabella López; María Alejandra Agudelo; María Gabriela Becerra	4:40.18	Honduras; Debbie Mejía; Deborah Castillo; Francis Escobar; Mariabelen Fajardo	4:49.86	Guatemala; Elissa Berganza; Linda de León; Lisbeth Alvarado; Samantha Méndez	4:52.50
4x100 m combined relay 16-18	Guatemala; Alejandra Alvarado; Emilia Sandoval; Melissa Diego; Sara Fernández	4:30.79	Ecuador; Ana Paula Morales; Elvira Espinosa; Emma Sabando; Eva Andrade	4:32.65	Honduras; Camila Lobo; Diana Espinal; Valentina Aguilar; Violeta Portillo	5:15.57
4x100 m combined relay 19-22	Argentina; Dalma González; Francesca Rossi; Iara Fernández; Juana Ortiz	4:29.83	Not awarded		Not awarded	

==== Mixed events ====
Event	Gold		Silver		Bronze	
4x100 m combined relay 13-15	Colombia; Ian Maldonado; Isabella López; María Gabriela Becerra; Nicolás Lacharme	4:17.15	Peru; Angeles Quispe; Carlos Díaz; Cielo Moya; Ismael Escalante	4:19.34	Mexico; Elizabeth Romano; Javier Meza; Santiago Unda; Yaretzi Lomelí	4:27.50
4x100 m combined relay 16-18	Venezuela; César Paredes; Dennis Pérez; Mónica Leydar; Sara González	4:10.47	Peru; Domenico Sotomayor; Lia Espinosa; Mariano Gómez; Yasmin Silva	4:10.52	Colombia; María Alejandra Santana; Emiliano Bedoya; Frank Solano; Isabella Budnik	4:12.63
4x100 m combined relay 19-22	Colombia; Gabriel Arias; Santiago Arteaga; Samantha Baños; Stefania Gómez	4:02.91	Puerto Rico; Alanis Maceira; Andrea Perea; Siul Ayala; Xavier Ruiz	4:06:67	Dominican Republic; Cristian Ramos; Darielys Ortiz; Elizabeth Jiménez; Fausto Ramirez	4:08.85
4x100 m freestyle relay 13-15	Peru; Angeles Quispe; Carlos Díaz; Cielo Moya; Ismael Escalante	3:54.23	Colombia; Ian Maldonado; Isabella López; María Gabriela Becerra; Nicolás Lacharme	3:55.16	Mexico; Elizabeth Romano; Javier Meza; Santiago Unda; Yaretzi Lomelí	3:56.30
4x100 m freestyle relay 16-18	Colombia; María Alejandra Santana; Emiliano Bedoya; Frank Solano; Isabella Budnik	3:42.24	Peru; Vicente Flores; Lia Espinosa; Mariano Gómez; Astrid García	3:43.88	Venezuela; César Paredes; Dennis Pérez; Mónica Leydar; Anna Hernández	3:49.89
4x100 m freestyle relay 19-22	Colombia; Sebastián Muñoz; Santiago Arteaga; Isabela Bedoya; Stefania Gómez	3:38.47	Venezuela; Fiorella Grossale; Francisco Montaño; Manuel Díaz; Yngrid Arias	3:42.30	Dominican Republic; Cristian Ramos; Darielys Ortiz; Elizabeth Jiménez; Mauricio Arias	3:44.20

=== Water polo ===
==== Men's event ====
Event	Gold	Silver	Bronze
U-17 Men's Team	Canada; Adam Rashed; Darion Wang; Elias Houidef; Elliot King; Elliot Griffioen; Ivan Khramstov; Jackson Culbreath; Josua Coxford; Julian Karharmanliev; Nash Porter; Noah Loo; Oliver Rais; Pavle Mladenovic; Rami Salem	Brazil; Aron Maestá; Calo Scaldelai; Danilo Santos; Eduardo Batista; Fabricio Ferreira; João Freitas; João Teixeira; Kauã Oliveira; Luca de Moraes; Marcelo Franchi; Niklas Capppellano; Pedro Matos; Pedro Gomes; Pedro Dos Santos	United States; Alistair Sterrett; Andrew Schneider; Christopher Koo; Cord McCall; Cortez Chavez; Curren Francisco; Ethan Wallace; Francesco Pintaric; Hunter Coleman; Jack Davis; Liam Zarcu; Owen Clark; Ronan Keane; Sungwon Shin; William Gorsche

==== Women's event ====
Event	Gold	Silver	Bronze
U-17 Women's Team	United States; Addison Ting; Campbell Pence; Caroline Daniel; Eden Coughran; Emilia Haast; Gia Jacob; Gianna Adams; Jade Pattison; Juliana Horton; Kennedy Fahey; Kiernan Hogan; Madison Mack; Paige Segesman; Shelby Killingsworth; Teodora Diaconu	Canada; Adéaïde Bilodeau; Adelyn Kyfiuk; Airi Cowie; Alexandra Stoddard; Alexandra Wilson; Auden Dolejsi; Ava Kyfiuk; Clara Shyiak; Jennika Linthicum; Lujayn Abdelfattah; Mckenna Pineda-Mclean; Sonia Paun; Tara Marunica; Yasmine Sowka	Brazil; Catarina Escobar; Esther Rodrigues; Evellyn Da Silva; Geovanna Urias; Ingrid Dos Santos; Júlia Morgado; Lara Mendes; Luma Abrantes; Lyvia Stringhetta; Maria Eduarda Barradas; Mariany Da Silva; Nicole Vieira; Nicolly Fernandes; Yasmin Magalhães
