= Haiti at the 2024 World Aquatics Championships =

- Flag of Haiti
- FINA code: HAI
- National federation: Fédération Haitienne des Sports Aquatiques
- Website: fhsas.com

in Doha, Qatar
- Competitors: 2 in 1 sport
- Medals: Gold 0 Silver 0 Bronze 0 Total 0

World Aquatics Championships appearances
- 2015; 2017; 2019; 2022; 2023; 2024

Haiti competed at the 2024 World Aquatics Championships in Doha, Qatar from 2 to 18 February.

== Competitors ==
The following is the list of competitors in the Championships.

Sport	Men	Women	Total
Swimming	1	1	2
Total	1	1	2

== Swimming ==
Haiti entered 2 swimmers.

Men

Athlete	Event	Heat		Semifinal		Final	
Athlete	Event	Time	Rank	Time	Rank	Time	Rank
Alexandre Grand'Pierre	50 metre breaststroke	28.39	30	Did not advance			
Alexandre Grand'Pierre	100 metre breaststroke	1:01.85	30	Did not advance			

Women

Athlete	Event	Heat		Semifinal		Final	
Athlete	Event	Time	Rank	Time	Rank	Time	Rank
Daknishael Sanon	100 metre freestyle	1:17.09	82	Did not advance			
Daknishael Sanon	50 metre butterfly	36.94	57	Did not advance			
