= Bahamas at the 2011 World Aquatics Championships =

Sporting event delegation

- Flag of the Bahamas
- World Aquatics code: BAH
- National federation: Bahamas Swimming Federation
- Website: bahamasswimmingfederation.com

in Shanghai, China
- Competitors: 3 in 1 sports
- Medals: Gold 0 Silver 0 Bronze 0 Total 0

World Aquatics Championships appearances
- 1973; 1975; 1978; 1982; 1986; 1991; 1994; 1998; 2001; 2003; 2005; 2007; 2009; 2011; 2013; 2015; 2017; 2019; 2022; 2023; 2024; 2025

The Bahamas competed at the 2011 World Aquatics Championships in Shanghai, China between July 16 and 31, 2011.

== Swimming ==
Bahamas qualified 3 swimmers.

Men

Athlete	Event	Heats		Semifinals		Final	
Athlete	Event	Time	Rank	Time	Rank	Time	Rank
Elvis Burrows	Men's 50m Freestyle	23.14	37	did not advance			
Elvis Burrows	Men's 50m Butterfly	24.35	28	did not advance			

Women

Athlete	Event	Heats		Semifinals		Final	
Athlete	Event	Time	Rank	Time	Rank	Time	Rank
Arianna Vanderpool-Wallace	Women's 50m Freestyle	25.28	15 Q	25.05	8 Q	24.79	7
Arianna Vanderpool-Wallace	Women's 100m Freestyle	54.51	11 Q	54.46	10	did not advance	
Alana Dillette	Women's 50m Backstroke	29.97	42	did not advance			
Alana Dillette	Women's 100m Backstroke	1:04.27	42	did not advance			
Alana Dillette	Women's 50m Butterfly	27.98	34	did not advance			
