= Bahamas at the 2023 World Aquatics Championships =

- Flag of the Bahamas
- FINA code: BAH
- National federation: Bahamas Aquatic Federation
- Website: bahamasswimmingfederation.com

in Fukuoka, Japan
- Competitors: 4 in 1 sport
- Officials: 0
- Medals: Gold 0 Silver 0 Bronze Total

World Aquatics Championships appearances
- 1973; 1975; 1978; 1982; 1986; 1991; 1994; 1998; 2001; 2003; 2005; 2007; 2009; 2011; 2013; 2015; 2017; 2019; 2022; 2023; 2024

Bahamas is set to compete at the 2023 World Aquatics Championships in Fukuoka, Japan from 14 to 30 July.

== Swimming ==
Bahamas entered 4 swimmers.

Men

Athlete	Event	Heat		Semifinal		Final	
Athlete	Event	Time	Rank	Time	Rank	Time	Rank
Davante Carey	100 metre backstroke	57.50	47	Did not advance			
Davante Carey	100 metre butterfly	55.48	52	Did not advance			
Lamar Taylor	50 metre freestyle	22.26 NR	28	Did not advance			
Lamar Taylor	50 metre backstroke	25.12	17	Did not advance			
Lamar Taylor	50 metre butterfly	23.91	40	Did not advance			

Women

Athlete	Event	Heat		Semifinal		Final	
Athlete	Event	Time	Rank	Time	Rank	Time	Rank
Rhanishka Gibbs	50 metre freestyle	26.64	51	Did not advance			
Rhanishka Gibbs	50 metre butterfly	28.43	39	Did not advance			
Zaylie Thompson	100 metre freestyle	58.86	38	Did not advance			
Zaylie Thompson	200 metre individual medley	2:25.36	34	Did not advance			

Mixed

Athlete	Event	Heat		Final	
Athlete	Event	Time	Rank	Time	Rank
Lamar Taylor; Davante Carey; Rhanishka Gibbs; Zaylie Thompson	4 × 100 m freestyle relay	3:43.19	27	Did not advance	
Lamar Taylor; Rhanishka Gibbs; Davante Carey; Zaylie Thompson	4 × 100 m medley relay	4:03.98	24	Did not advance	
