= Bahamas at the 2017 World Aquatics Championships =

- Flag of the Bahamas
- FINA code: BAH
- National federation: Bahamas Swimming Federation
- Website: bahamasswimmingfederation.com

in Budapest, Hungary
- Competitors: 2 in 1 sport
- Medals: Gold 0 Silver 0 Bronze 0 Total 0

World Aquatics Championships appearances
- 1973; 1975; 1978; 1982; 1986; 1991; 1994; 1998; 2001; 2003; 2005; 2007; 2009; 2011; 2013; 2015; 2017; 2019; 2022; 2023; 2024

The Bahamas competed at the 2017 World Aquatics Championships in Budapest, Hungary from 14 July to 30 July.

== Swimming ==
Bahamas has received a Universality invitation from FINA to send two male swimmers to the World Championships.

Athlete	Event	Heat		Semifinal		Final	
Athlete	Event	Time	Rank	Time	Rank	Time	Rank
N'Nhyn Fernander	Men's 50 m breaststroke	29.75	51	did not advance			
N'Nhyn Fernander	Men's 50 m butterfly	25.20	51	did not advance			
Matthew Lowe	Men's 200 m freestyle	1:55.71	63	did not advance			
Matthew Lowe	Men's 200 m butterfly	2:06.29	41	did not advance			
