= Mayah Chouloute =

Haitian-American swimmer

Personal information
- Full name: Mayah Ruth Chouloute
- National team: Haiti
- Born: 18 November 2009 (age 16) Boca Raton, Florida, U.S.

Sport
- Sport: Swimming
- Club: Saint Andrews Aquatics
- Coach: Quinn Cassidy

Mayah Ruth Chouloute (born 18 November 2009) is a Haitian-American swimmer. She represented Haiti at the 2024 Summer Olympics when she was 14 years old. She also represented Haiti at the 2025 World Aquatics Championships. She is the Haitian short-course record holder in both the 50 and 100 metre butterfly.

== Swimming career ==
Chouloute started swimming when she was six years old in after-school swimming classes.

Chouloute represented Haiti at the 2024 Summer Olympics when she was 14 years old, making her the youngest member of the Haitian Olympic team. She competed in the women's 50 metre freestyle, where she was ranked 59th out of 79 swimmers. She qualified for the Olympics through Universality Place, in which spots are given to Olympic-level athletes to represent countries with 8 or fewer athletes in the last two editions of the Olympic Games.

Chouloute competed at the 2024 World Short-Course Championships in Budapest. In the 50 metre freestyle, she placed 77th out of the 94 competing swimmers with a time of 28.43. Then, in the 100 metre butterfly, she finished last out of the 48 competing athletes, but she set the national record with a time of 1:16.31. Her time from the first 50 metres of 33.73 also set a national record.

Chouloute represented Haiti at the 2025 World Aquatics Championships in Singapore. She placed 75th in the 50 metre freestyle out of the 100 competitors, and she placed 72nd in the 50 metre butterfly. At the 2025 Junior Pan American Games in Asunción, she finished 36th in the 50 metre freestyle and 42nd in the 100 metre freestyle, with personal best times in both events.

== Personal life ==
Chouloute was born to Haitian parents in Boca Raton, Florida. She attends Florida Atlantic University High School.
