= List of Bahamian records in swimming =

This is a list of national swimming records for The Bahamas. These are the fastest times ever swum by a Bahamian swimmer which are recognised and ratified by Bahamas Aquatics.

All records were set in finals unless noted otherwise.

== Long Course (50 m) ==
=== Men ===
Event	Time		Name	Club	Date	Meet	Location	Ref
50 m freestyle	22.05	r, †, =	Lamar Taylor	Makos	22 June 2025	Bahamian Championships	Nassau, Bahamas	
50 m freestyle	22.05	h, =	Lamar Taylor	Bahamas	1 August 2025	World Championships	Singapore, Singapore	
100 m freestyle	48.51		Lamar Taylor	Bahamas	12 August 2025	Junior Pan American Games	Asunción, Paraguay	
200 m freestyle	1:53.05		Jeremy Knowles	Swift	27 June 2008	–	Nassau, Bahamas	
400 m freestyle	3:59.01		Jeremy Knowles	–	11 July 2003	–	Nassau, Bahamas	
800 m freestyle	8:22.31		Matthew Lowe	Bahamas	19 February 2016	BSF Last Chance Meet	Nassau, Bahamas	
1500 m freestyle	16:07.53	h	Matthew Lowe	Bahamas	3 August 2013	World Championships	Barcelona, Spain	
50 m backstroke	25.08		Lamar Taylor	Bahamas	28 June 2023	CAC Games	San Salvador, El Salvador	
100 m backstroke	56.22	rh	Lamar Taylor	Bahamas	14 August 2025	Junior Pan American Games	Asunción, Paraguay	
200 m backstroke	2:08.05	b	Davante Carey	Unattached	2 May 2021	UANA Tokyo Qualifier	Orlando, United States	
50 m breaststroke	27.60	h	Izaak Bastian	Barracuda Swim Club	26 June 2021	Bahamian Championships	Nassau, Bahamas	
100 m breaststroke	1:00.87	h	Izaak Bastian	Barracuda Swim Club	27 June 2021	Bahamian Championships	Nassau, Bahamas	
200 m breaststroke	2:15.14		Izaak Bastian	Barracuda Swim Club	24 June 2021	Bahamian Championships	Nassau, Bahamas	
50m butterfly	23.74	h	Elvis Burrows	Bahamas	26 July 2009	World Championships	Rome, Italy	
100m butterfly	53.51	h	Elvis Burrows	Bahamas	31 July 2009	World Championships	Rome, Italy	
100m butterfly	53.51	=	Elvis Burrows	–	January 2011	–		
200m butterfly	1:58.25	h	Jeremy Knowles	Bahamas	17 August 2006	Pan Pacific Championships	Victoria, Canada	
200m individual medley	2:01.35	h	Jeremy Knowles	Bahamas	13 August 2008	Olympic Games	Beijing, China	
400m individual medley	4:22.04		Jeremy Knowles	Bahamas	12 August 2003	Pan American Games	Santo Domingo, Dominican Republic	
4×50m freestyle relay	1:34.33		N'Nhyn Fernander; Izaak Bastian; Gershwin Greene; Kohen Kerr	Barracuda Swim Club	22 June 2017	–	Nassau, Bahamas	
4×100m freestyle relay	3:24.86		Lamar Taylor (49.01); Nigel Forbes (51.27); Emmanuel Gadson (53.84); Marvin Johnson (50.74)	Bahamas	10 August 2025	Junior Pan American Games	Asunción, Paraguay	
4×200m freestyle relay	7:58.58		Jeremy Knowles; Chris Vythoulkas; Kristoph Carey; Travano McPhee	Bahamas	12 August 2003	Pan American Games	Santo Domingo, Dominican Republic	
4×50m medley relay	1:46.12		Davante Carey; Kierro Stubbs; Ian Pinder; Kohen Kerr	Mako Aquatics Club	22 June 2019	Bahamas Nationals	Nassau, Bahamas	
4×100m medley relay	3:45.26	h	Lamar Taylor (56.22); Emmanuel Gadson (1:03.53); Nigel Forbes (55.04); Marvin Johnson (50.47)	Bahamas	14 August 2025	Junior Pan American Games	Asunción, Paraguay	

Legend: # – Record awaiting ratification by BSF; WR – World record; AM – Americas record; e – equalled existing record;
Records not set in finals: h – heat; sf – semifinal; r – relay 1st leg; rh – relay heat 1st leg; b – B final; † – en route to final mark; so – swim-off; tt – time trial

=== Women ===
Event	Time		Name	Club	Date	Meet	Location	Ref
50m freestyle	24.31	h	Arianna Vanderpool-Wallace	Bahamas	17 July 2015	Pan American Games	Toronto, Canada	
100m freestyle	53.73	h	Arianna Vanderpool-Wallace	Bahamas	1 August 2012	Olympic Games	London, Great Britain	
200m freestyle	1:58.03		Joanna Evans	Bahamas	21 July 2018	CAC Games	Barranquilla, Colombia	
400m freestyle	4:07.33		Joanna Evans	Longhorn Aquatic Club	20 May 2021	Longhorn Elite Invite	Austin, United States	
800m freestyle	8:31.18		Joanna Evans	Bahamas	25 August 2017	Universiade	Taipei, Taiwan	
1500m freestyle	17:23.39		Joanna Evans	SWIFT-BA	2 November 2013	Family Guardian Invitational	Nassau, Bahamas	
50m backstroke	29.40		Alana Dillette	Swift	20 June 2011	Bahamian Championships	Nassau, Bahamas	
100m backstroke	1:02.56	h	Alana Dillette	Bahamas	10 August 2008	Olympic Games	Beijing, China	
200m backstroke	2:20.22		McKayla Lightbourne	Swift	10 June 2007	–	Nassau, Bahamas	
200m backstroke	2:19.25	b, not ratified	McKayla Lightbourne	Bahamas	20 October 2011	Pan American Games	Zapopan, Mexico	
50m breaststroke	32.06		Lilly Higgs	Unattached	26 June 2021	Bahamian Championships	Nassau, Bahamas	
100m breaststroke	1:09.52	h	Lilly Higgs	Unattached	6 December 2019	U.S. Open	Atlanta, United States	
200m breaststroke	2:26.91	tt	Laura Morley	Mako Aquatics Club	27 June 2021	Bahamian Championships	Nassau, Bahamas	
50m butterfly	25.53		Arianna Vanderpool-Wallace	Bahamas	27 July 2014	Commonwealth Games	Glasgow, Great Britain	
100m butterfly	58.87		Arianna Vanderpool-Wallace	SwimMAC Carolina	15 May 2015	Arena Pro Series	Charlotte, United States	
200m butterfly	2:21.67		Arianna Vanderpool-Wallace	Bahamas	9 April 2007	CARIFTA Championships	Kinston, Jamaica	
200m individual medley	2:17.45		Joanna Evans	Bahamas	24 July 2018	CAC Games	Barranquilla, Colombia	
400m individual medley	4:50.38		Joanna Evans	Bahamas	23 July 2018	CAC Games	Barranquilla, Colombia	
4×50m freestyle relay	1:48.06		Arianna Vanderpool-Wallace; Alicia Lightbourne; Ashley Butler; Ariel Weech	Bahamas	30 March 2008	CARIFTA Championships	Savaneta, Aruba	
4×100m freestyle relay	3:47.40		Alana Dillette; Arianna Vanderpool-Wallace; Ariel Weech; Alicia Lightbourne	Bahamas	29 March 2012	–	Montreal, Canada	
4×200m freestyle relay	8:36.28		Alana Dillette; Teisha Lightbourne; Jenna Chaplin; Arianna Vanderpool-Wallace	Bahamas	18 July 2010	CAC Games	Mayagüez, Puerto Rico	
4×50m medley relay	1:58.81		Alana Dillette; McKayla Lightbourne; Arianna Vanderpool-Wallace; Ashley Butler	–	20 June 2011	Bahamian Championships	Nassau, Bahamas	
4×100m medley relay	4:15.59	h	Alana Dillette (1:03.40); Alicia Lightbourne (1:12.28); Arianna Vanderpool-Wallace (1:00.45); Teisha Lightbourne (59.46)	Bahamas	1 August 2009	World Championships	Rome, Italy	

Legend: # – Record awaiting ratification by BSF; WR – World record; AM – Americas record; e – equalled existing record;
Records not set in finals: h – heat; sf – semifinal; r – relay 1st leg; rh – relay heat 1st leg; b – B final; † – en route to final mark; so – swim-off; tt – time trial

=== Mixed relay ===
Event	Time		Name	Club	Date	Meet	Location	Ref
4×50 m freestyle relay	1:39.90		Elvis Burrows (25.17); Joanna Evans (24.94); Armando Moss (23.48); Arianna Vanderpool-Wallace (26.31)	Bahamas	29 June 2016	CISC	Nassau, Bahamas	
4×100 m freestyle relay	3:37.23		Marvin Johnson (50.72); Lamar Taylor (48.86); Zoe Williamson (58.41); Elyse Wood (59.24)	Bahamas	11 August 2025	Junior Pan American Games	Asunción, Paraguay	
4×50 m medley relay	1:59.21		Davante Carey; Jamilah Hepburn; Ian Pinder; Laura Morley	Mako Aquatics Club	22 June 2019	Bahamas Nationals	Nassau, Bahamas	
4×100 m medley relay	4:03.98	h	Lamar Taylor (55.03); Rhanishka Gibbs (1:15.42); Dawanted Carey (54.80); Zaylie Thompson (58.73)	Bahamas	26 July 2023	World Championships	Fukuoka, Japan	

Legend: # – Record awaiting ratification by BSF; WR – World record; AM – Americas record; e – equalled existing record;
Records not set in finals: h – heat; so – swim-off

== Short Course (25 m) ==
=== Men ===
Event	Time		Name	Club	Date	Meet	Location	Ref
50 m freestyle	20.95		Lamar Taylor	Tennessee Aquatics	15 October 2026	UVA Pro Elite SCM Worlds Prep Meet	Charlottesville, United States	
100 m freestyle	46.34	sf	Lamar Taylor	Bahamas	11 December 2024	World Championships	Budapest, Hungary	
200 m freestyle	1:51.31	h	Luke Thompson	Bahamas	18 December 2022	World Championships	Melbourne, Australia	
400 m freestyle	3:56.22	h	Luke Thompson	Bahamas	15 December 2022	World Championships	Melbourne, Australia	
800 m freestyle								
1500 m freestyle	15:50.70		Jeremy Knowles	-	1998			
50m backstroke	23.41		Lamar Taylor	Tennessee Aquatics	15 October 2026	UVA Pro Elite SCM Worlds Prep Meet	Charlottesville, United States	
100m backstroke	51.99	h	Lamar Taylor	Bahamas	25 October 2025	World Cup	Toronto, Canada	
200m backstroke	2:06.60		Jeremy Knowles	-	1998			
50m breaststroke	27.24	h	Izaak Bastian	Bahamas	20 December 2021	World Championships	Abu Dhabi, United Arab Emirates	
100m breaststroke	59.61	h	Izaak Bastian	Bahamas	16 December 2021	World Championships	Abu Dhabi, United Arab Emirates	
200m breaststroke	2:10.49	h	Emmanuel Gadson	Bahamas	13 December 2024	World Championships	Budapest, Hungary	
50m butterfly	23.24	h	Lamar Taylor	Bahamas	10 December 2024	World Championships	Budapest, Hungary	
100m butterfly	52.89	h	Jeremy Knowles	Bahamas	9 April 2008	World Championships	Manchester, Great Britain	
200m butterfly	1:54.31		Jeremy Knowles	Bahamas	13 April 2008	World Championships	Manchester, Great Britain	
100m individual medley	54.70	h	Lamar Taylor	Bahamas	17 October 2025	World Cup	Westmont, United States	
200m individual medley	1:56.78		Jeremy Knowles	Bahamas	11 April 2008	World Championships	Manchester, Great Britain	
400m individual medley	4:13.92		Jeremy Knowles	2004				
4×50m freestyle relay								
4×100m freestyle relay								
4×200m freestyle relay								
4×50m medley relay								
4×100m medley relay								

Legend: # – Record awaiting ratification by BSF; WR – World record; AM – Americas record; e – equalled existing record;
Records not set in finals: h – heat; sf – semifinal; r – relay 1st leg; rh – relay heat 1st leg; b – B final; † – en route to final mark; so – swim-off; tt – time trial

=== Women ===
Event	Time		Name	Club	Date	Meet	Location	Ref
50 m freestyle	23.93		Arianna Vanderpool-Wallace	Bahamas	7 December 2014	World Championships	Doha, Qatar	
100 m freestyle	52.34		Arianna Vanderpool-Wallace	Bahamas	5 December 2014	World Championships	Doha, Qatar	
200 m freestyle	1:54.36		Joanna Evans	DC Trident	26 November 2021	International Swimming League	Eindhoven, Netherlands	
400 m freestyle	4:00.14		Joanna Evans	DC Trident	29 September 2021	International Swimming League	Naples, Italy	
800 m freestyle	8:38.07		Joanna Evans	Bahamas	4 December 2014	World Championships	Doha, Qatar	
1500 m freestyle								
50 m backstroke	28.36	h	Alana Kathryn Dillette	Bahamas	18 December 2010	World Championships	Dubai, United Arab Emirates	
100 m backstroke	1:01.33	h	Alana Kathryn Dillette	Bahamas	15 December 2010	World Championships	Dubai, United Arab Emirates	
200 m backstroke								
50 m breaststroke	31.38	h	Lillian Higgs	Bahamas	16 December 2021	World Championships	Abu Dhabi, United Arab Emirates	
100 m breaststroke	1:07.87	h	Lillian Higgs	Bahamas	19 December 2021	World Championships	Abu Dhabi, United Arab Emirates	
200 m breaststroke								
50m butterfly	26.22	h	Arianna Vanderpool-Wallace	Bahamas	4 December 2014	World Championships	Doha, Qatar	
100m butterfly	58.21	h	Arianna Vanderpool-Wallace	Bahamas	18 December 2010	World Championships	Dubai, United Arab Emirates	
200m butterfly								
100m individual medley	1:02.88	h	Alana Kathryn Dillette	Bahamas	16 December 2010	World Championships	Dubai, United Arab Emirates	
200m individual medley								
400m individual medley								
4×50m freestyle relay								
4×100m freestyle relay								
4×200m freestyle relay								
4×50m medley relay								
4×100m medley relay								

Legend: # – Record awaiting ratification by BSF; WR – World record; AM – Americas record; e – equalled existing record;
Records not set in finals: h – heat; sf – semifinal; r – relay 1st leg; rh – relay heat 1st leg; b – B final; † – en route to final mark; so – swim-off; tt – time trial
