= Bahamas at the 2019 World Aquatics Championships =

- Flag of the Bahamas
- FINA code: BAH
- National federation: Bahamas Swimming Federation
- Website: bahamasswimmingfederation.com

in Gwangju, South Korea
- Competitors: 4 in 1 sport
- Medals: Gold 0 Silver 0 Bronze 0 Total 0

World Aquatics Championships appearances
- 1973; 1975; 1978; 1982; 1986; 1991; 1994; 1998; 2001; 2003; 2005; 2007; 2009; 2011; 2013; 2015; 2017; 2019; 2022; 2023; 2024

Bahamas competed at the 2019 World Aquatics Championships in Gwangju, South Korea from 12 to 28 July.

== Swimming ==
Bahamas entered four swimmers.

Men

Athlete	Event	Heat		Semifinal		Final	
Athlete	Event	Time	Rank	Time	Rank	Time	Rank
Izaak Bastian	50 m breaststroke	28.98	49	Did not advance			
Izaak Bastian	100 m breaststroke	1:03.60	58	Did not advance			
Jared Fitzgerald	50 m freestyle	24.15	75	Did not advance			
Jared Fitzgerald	100 m freestyle	51.88	71	Did not advance			

Women

Athlete	Event	Heat		Semifinal		Final	
Athlete	Event	Time	Rank	Time	Rank	Time	Rank
Joanna Evans	200 m freestyle	2:02.76	31	Did not advance			
Joanna Evans	400 m freestyle	4:11.06	16	—		Did not advance	
Joanna Evans	800 m freestyle	DNS		—		Did not advance	
Margaret Higgs	100 m breaststroke	1:10.65	35	Did not advance			
Margaret Higgs	200 m breaststroke	2:30.50	25	Did not advance			
