= Bahamas at the 2024 World Aquatics Championships =

- Flag of the Bahamas
- FINA code: BAH
- National federation: Bahamas Aquatic Federation
- Website: www.bahamasaquatics.com

in Doha, Qatar
- Competitors: 4 in 1 sport
- Medals: Gold 0 Silver 0 Bronze 0 Total 0

World Aquatics Championships appearances
- 1973; 1975; 1978; 1982; 1986; 1991; 1994; 1998; 2001; 2003; 2005; 2007; 2009; 2011; 2013; 2015; 2017; 2019; 2022; 2023; 2024

Bahamas will compete at the 2024 World Aquatics Championships in Doha, Qatar from 2 to 18 February.

== Competitors ==
The following is the list of competitors in the Championships.

Sport	Men	Women	Total
Swimming	2	2	4
Total	2	2	4

== Swimming ==
Bahamas entered 4 swimmers.

Men

Athlete	Event	Heat		Semifinal		Final	
Athlete	Event	Time	Rank	Time	Rank	Time	Rank
Marvin Johnson	100 m freestyle	51.01	42	Did not advance			
Marvin Johnson	100 m butterfly	57.29	51	Did not advance			
Lamar Taylor	50 m freestyle	22.41	32	Did not advance			
Lamar Taylor	50 m backstroke	25.80	21	Did not advance			
Lamar Taylor	50 m butterfly	24.85	40	Did not advance			

Women

Athlete	Event	Heat		Semifinal		Final	
Athlete	Event	Time	Rank	Time	Rank	Time	Rank
Rhanishka Gibbs	50 m freestyle	26.87	53	Did not advance			
Rhanishka Gibbs	100 m breaststroke	1:12.27	38	Did not advance			
Victoria Russell	50 m breaststroke	34.03	35	Did not advance			
Victoria Russell	50 m butterfly	29.16	40	Did not advance			

Mixed

Athlete	Event	Heat		Final	
Athlete	Event	Time	Rank	Time	Rank
Rhanishka Gibbs; Marvin Johnson; Victoria Russell; Lamar Taylor	4 × 100 m freestyle relay	3:49.63	15	Did not advance	
Rhanishka Gibbs; Marvin Johnson; Victoria Russell; Lamar Taylor	4 × 100 m medley relay	4:06.91	24	Did not advance	
