= Bahamas at the 2013 World Aquatics Championships =

- Flag of the Bahamas
- FINA code: BAH
- National federation: Bahamas Swimming Federation
- Website: bahamasswimmingfederation.com

in Barcelona, Spain
- Competitors: 4 in 1 sports
- Medals: Gold 0 Silver 0 Bronze 0 Total 0

World Aquatics Championships appearances
- 1973; 1975; 1978; 1982; 1986; 1991; 1994; 1998; 2001; 2003; 2005; 2007; 2009; 2011; 2013; 2015; 2017; 2019; 2022; 2023; 2024

Bahamas is competing at the 2013 World Aquatics Championships in Barcelona, Spain between 19 July and 4 August 2013.

== Swimming ==
Bahamian swimmers earned qualifying standards in the following events (up to a maximum of 2 swimmers in each event at the A-standard entry time, and 1 at the B-standard):

Men

Athlete	Event	Heat		Semifinal		Final	
Athlete	Event	Time	Rank	Time	Rank	Time	Rank
Elvis Burrows	50 m freestyle	22.98	38	did not advance			
Elvis Burrows	50 m butterfly	23.98	26	did not advance			
Matthew Lowe	400 m freestyle	4:03.01	41	—		did not advance	
Matthew Lowe	1500 m freestyle	16:07.53	35	—		did not advance	

Women

Athlete	Event	Heat		Semifinal		Final	
Athlete	Event	Time	Rank	Time	Rank	Time	Rank
McKayla Lightbourn	100 m backstroke	1:04.97	39	did not advance			
McKayla Lightbourn	200 m individual medley	2:20.83	38	did not advance			
Arianna Vanderpool-Wallace	50 m freestyle	25.15	13 Q	25.24	15	did not advance	
Arianna Vanderpool-Wallace	100 m freestyle	54.42	9 Q	54.44	10	did not advance	
