= Bahamas at the 2022 World Aquatics Championships =

- Flag of the Bahamas
- FINA code: BAH
- National federation: Bahamas Swimming Federation
- Website: bahamasswimmingfederation.com

in Budapest, Hungary
- Competitors: 4 in 1 sport
- Medals: Gold 0 Silver 0 Bronze 0 Total 0

World Aquatics Championships appearances
- 1973; 1975; 1978; 1982; 1986; 1991; 1994; 1998; 2001; 2003; 2005; 2007; 2009; 2011; 2013; 2015; 2017; 2019; 2022; 2023; 2024

Bahamas competed at the 2022 World Aquatics Championships in Budapest, Hungary from 18 June to 3 July.

== Swimming ==
Bahamian swimmers have achieved qualifying standards in the following events.

| Athlete | Event | Heat | | Semifinal | | Final | |
| Athlete | Event | Time | Rank | Time | Rank | Time | Rank |
|---|---|---|---|---|---|---|---|
| Izaak Bastian | Men's 50 m breaststroke | 28.47 | 32 | did not advance | | | |
| Izaak Bastian | Men's 100 m breaststroke | 1:03.79 | 42 | did not advance | | | |
| Lamar Taylor | Men's 50 m freestyle | 22.86 | 48 | did not advance | | | |
| Lamar Taylor | Men's 100 m freestyle | 50.36 | 47 | did not advance | | | |
| Lillian Higgs | Women's 50 m breaststroke | 32.98 | 37 | did not advance | | | |
| Lillian Higgs | Women's 200 m breaststroke | 1:13.13 | 41 | did not advance | | | |
| Zaylie Thompson | Women's 100 m freestyle | 1:01.04 | 42 | did not advance | | | |
| Zaylie Thompson | Women's 200 m individual medley | 2:30.15 | 36 | did not advance | | | |
| Izaak Bastian; Lamar Taylor; Lillian Higgs; Zaylie Thompson | 4 × 100 m mixed medley relay | 4:15.19 | 22 | — | | did not advance | |
