= Haiti at the 2015 World Aquatics Championships =

- Flag of Haiti
- FINA code: HAI
- National federation: Fédération Haïtienne des Sports; Aquatiques et de Sauvetage
- Website: www.ashanasa.org

in Kazan, Russia
- Competitors: 2 in 1 sport
- Medals: Gold 0 Silver 0 Bronze 0 Total 0

World Aquatics Championships appearances
- 2015; 2017; 2019; 2022; 2023; 2024

Haiti competed at the 2015 World Aquatics Championships in Kazan, Russia from 24 July to 9 August 2015.

== Swimming ==
Haitian swimmers have achieved qualifying standards in the following events (up to a maximum of 2 swimmers in each event at the A-standard entry time, and 1 at the B-standard):

Men

Athlete	Event	Heat		Semifinal		Final	
Athlete	Event	Time	Rank	Time	Rank	Time	Rank
Frantz Dorsainvil	50 m freestyle	31.93	112	did not advance			
Fenel Lamour	100 m freestyle	DNS		did not advance			
