= Haiti at the 2022 World Aquatics Championships =

- Flag of Haiti
- FINA code: HAI
- National federation: Fédération Haitienne des Sports Aquatiques

in Budapest, Hungary
- Competitors: 2 in 1 sport
- Medals: Gold 0 Silver 0 Bronze 0 Total 0

World Aquatics Championships appearances
- 2015; 2017; 2019; 2022; 2023; 2024

Haiti competed at the 2022 World Aquatics Championships in Budapest, Hungary from 17 June to 3 July.

== Swimming ==
Haiti entered two swimmers.

Men

Athlete	Event	Heat		Semifinal		Final	
Athlete	Event	Time	Rank	Time	Rank	Time	Rank
Asdad Fenelus	100 m freestyle	1:17.87	99	did not advance			
Asdad Fenelus	50 m breaststroke	DSQ		did not advance			
Raphael Grand'Pierre	50 m freestyle	24.94	69	did not advance			
Raphael Grand'Pierre	100 m butterfly	59.08	56	did not advance			
