= Naomy Grand'Pierre =

Haitian-American swimmer (born 1997)

Personal information
- Nationality: Haitian-American
- Born: 16 April 1997 (age 29) Montreal, Quebec, Canada

Sport
- Sport: Swimming
- College team: University of Chicago

Naomy Grand'Pierre (born 16 April 1997) is a Haitian-American swimmer. She competed in the women's 50 metre freestyle event at the 2016 Summer Olympics, where she ranked 56th with a time of 27.46 seconds. Grand'Pierre is the first woman from Haiti to compete as a swimmer in the Olympics.

Born in Montreal and raised in Atlanta, Georgia, Grand'Pierre is a dual US-Haitian citizen. She is a graduate of Whitefield Academy (Georgia) and the University of Chicago (Class of 2019) and collaborated with the USA Swimming Diversity and Inclusion Committee during her college years. She is currently helping the Haitian National Swim Team, in collaboration with the FHSA (Haitian Swimming Federation), structure their program to give Haitians in Haiti and the Diaspora more access to the sport.

== Records ==
Professional Career
Event	Time	Pool Length	Competition	Notes
50 Free	27.96	25m	FINA World Swimming Championships 2016	
100 Free	58.55	25m	FINA World Swimming Championships 2016	
50 Breast	34.22	25m	FINA World Swimming Championships 2016	
100 Medley	01:06.11	25m	FINA World Swimming Championships 2016	
50 Free	27.35	50m	Caribbean Islands Swimming Championships 2016	NR
100 Free	01:03.03	50m	XXIII Juegos CAC-Barranquilla 2018	NR
50 Breast	35.85	50m	FINA World Swimming Championships 2017	
50 Fly	30.10	50m	Caribbean Islands Swimming Championships 2016	NR

== Personal life ==
Her mother encouraged all five of her children to swim after three relatives drowned. She is the older sister of Emilie Grand'Pierre, another Haitian swimmer who competed at the Tokyo Olympics 2020.
