= The Bahamas Aquatics Federation =

Bahamanian governing body of swimming

Bahamas Aquatic Federation
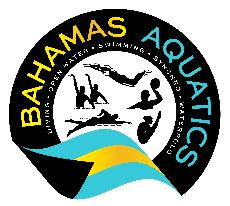
- Sport: Aquatic sports
- Category: Swimming, synchronized swimming, diving, high diving, Open Water Swimming and water polo
- Jurisdiction: National
- Abbreviation: BAF
- Affiliation: FINA
- Affiliation date: 1952
- President: Algernon Cargill
- Secretary: Alexis Wells

Official website
- www.bahamasaquatics.com

The Bahamas Aquatics Federation (BAF) is the governing body of swimming in the Bahamas. They are also responsible for the development of synchronized swimming, diving, water polo, open water swimming. BAF is a member of the International Swimming Organization FINA and Central American and Caribbean Swimming Federation.

== Facilities ==
The country has four 25-Metre pools and two 25-Yard Outdoor completion pools in Nassau, Bahamas. In May 2000 the Government of Bahamas constructed the Betty Kelly Keening National Swim Complex. The country now owns a 10 Lane 50 Meter Outdoor swimming pool accompanied by 8 -Lane 25 Meter Training pool.
