= Pan American Aquatics Championships =

International competitive spporting event

The Pan American Aquatics Championships (also PanAm Aquatics Championships) are the official continental championships for aquatic sports for the Americas (comprising North America, South America, Central America and the Caribbean). It is organized by PanAm Aquatics, the governing body of aquatics in the Americas, formerly the Swimming Union of the Americas (UANA or ASUA).

The inaugural edition took place from May 13 to 25, 2025, in Medellín, Colombia. It consisted of five major disciplines: diving, water polo, swimming, open water swimming, and artistic swimming. For the first four disciplines, athletes were 22 years or under, while the latter included senior athletes.

The championship serves as a qualifying event for the World Aquatics Championships, the Junior Pan American Games, the World Aquatics Junior Swimming Championships and the World Aquatics U20 Water Polo Championships.

== Editions ==
Year	Event	Location	Ref.
2025	2025 Pan American Aquatics Championships	Medellín, Colombia	

== Participating nations ==
As of the 2025 edition, the following delegations participate:

- Anguilla
- Antigua and Barbuda
- Argentina
- Aruba
- Bahamas
- Barbados
- Belize
- Bermuda
- Bolivia
- Brazil
- British Virgin Islands
- Canada
- Cayman Islands
- Chile
- Colombia
- Costa Rica
- Cuba
- Curaçao
- Dominica
- Dominican Republic
- Ecuador
- El Salvador
- Grenada
- Guatemala
- Guyana
- Haiti
- Honduras
- Jamaica
- Mexico
- Nicaragua
- Panama
- Paraguay
- Peru
- Puerto Rico
- Saint Kitts and Nevis
- Saint Lucia
- Sint Maarten
- Saint Vincent and the Grenadines
- Suriname
- Trinidad and Tobago
- Turks and Caicos Islands
- United States
- U.S. Virgin Islands
- Uruguay
- Venezuela

== Medal table ==
Rank	Nation	Gold	Silver	Bronze	Total
1	Mexico	51	47	25	123
2	Colombia	46	18	20	84
3	Peru	21	16	16	53
4	United States	10	3	6	19
5	Ecuador	9	9	13	31
6	Canada	9	8	10	27
7	Guatemala	8	15	9	32
8	Argentina	8	9	6	23
9	Venezuela	7	17	11	35
10	Puerto Rico	6	9	3	18
11	Dominican Republic	6	4	2	12
12	Chile	5	5	6	16
13	Guyana	4	0	0	4
14	Honduras	3	5	15	23
15	Uruguay	3	0	1	4
16	Brazil	2	8	7	17
17	Costa Rica	2	6	10	18
18	Cuba	2	4	4	10
19	Aruba	2	1	7	10
20	U.S. Virgin Islands	1	3	1	5
21	El Salvador	1	2	1	4
22	Jamaica	0	3	5	8
23	Curaçao	0	1	2	3
23	Haiti	0	1	2	3
25	Nicaragua	0	0	4	4
26	Saint Lucia	0	0	1	1
Totals (26 entries)		206	194	187	587

== See also ==
- South American Swimming Championships
