= Davidson Vincent =

Haitian swimmer (born 2001)

Personal information
- Nationality: Haiti
- Born: 5 September 2001 (age 23); Thomonde, Haiti

Sport
- Sport: Swimming

Davidson Vincent (born 5 September 2001) is a Haitian swimmer. He competed in the 2020 Summer Olympics.
