= Alexandre Grand'Pierre =

Haitian-American swimmer

Alexander Grand'Pierre (born 22 January 2003 ) is a Haitian-American swimmer. Grand'Pierre swam collegiately at Bowdoin College, where he was a Division III All-American and a New England Small College Athletic Conference champion. Born in Atlanta to Haitian parents, Grand'Pierre represented Haiti at the 2024 Summer Olympics where he competed in the men's 100m breaststroke. Grand'Pierre qualified for the Games after winning the gold medal in the men's 100m breaststroke at the 2024 Central American and Caribbean Swimming Championships. He finished fourth in his heat with a time of 1:02.85 and did not make the semifinals. He placed 28th overall.

== Personal life ==
Grand'Pierre's sister Naomy is also an Olympic swimmer who competed for Haiti at the 2016 Summer Olympics.
