= Emilie Grand'Pierre =

Haitian swimmer (born 2001)

Personal information
- Full name: Emilie Faith Grand'Pierre
- Nationality: Haitian
- Born: 3 May 2001 (age 25) Atlanta, Georgia, US

Sport
- Sport: Swimming
- Strokes: Breaststroke
- College team: Bowdoin College

Emilie Grand'Pierre (born 3 May 2001) is a Haitian swimmer. She competed in the women's 100 metre breaststroke at the 2020 Summer Olympics, and received a time of 1:14.82. She attended Bowdoin College.
