= Marathon swimming at the 2024 Summer Olympics – Men's 10 kilometre =

Men's marathon swimming at the Games of the XXXIII Olympiad
- Venue: River Seine
- Dates: 9 August 2024
- Competitors: 33
- Winning time: 1:50:52.7

Medalists
1st place, gold medalist(s)		Kristóf Rasovszky	Hungary
2nd place, silver medalist(s)		Oliver Klemet	Germany
3rd place, bronze medalist(s)		Dávid Betlehem	Hungary

The men's marathon swimming 10 kilometre event at the 2024 Summer Olympics was held on 9 August 2024 in the River Seine, Paris. France spent €1.4–1.6 billion to clean up the Seine in preparation for the Olympic events, but heavy rainfall caused bacteria levels to increase and one of the pre-event training sessions was cancelled. Nonetheless, another training session went ahead and the race started as scheduled.

The race consisted of six 1.67 kilometre loops between Pont Alexandre III and Pont de l'Alma. When travelling from Pont Alexandre III to Pont de l'Alma, the athletes were swimming downstream, but on the way back they were swimming upstream.

Germany's Florian Wellbrock and Hungary's Kristóf Rasovszky were ahead for most of the start of the race, but going into the final lap, Wellbrock swam wide around the bend, which relegated him from second to seventh. He was unable to swim himself back into a podium position for the rest of the race. Rasovszky and Germany's Oliver Klemet were in first and second position going into the final straight, and they raced in a sprint finish. Rasovszky won with a time of 1:50:52.7, while Klemet finished second with 1:50:54.8. Hungary's Dávid Betlehem and Italy's Domenico Acerenza also raced in a sprint finish for third, and Betlehem won it to finish with 1:51:09.0 for third, while Acerenza finished with 1:51:09.6 for fourth.

== Qualification ==
Each National Olympic Committee (NOC) was permitted to enter a maximum of two qualified athletes in the event. World Aquatics provided a qualification pathway to fulfil their quota of at least 22 competing athletes. Athletes were selected in the following order:

- The three medalists in the 10 km races at the 2023 World Aquatics Championships
- The top thirteen swimmers in the 10 km races at the 2024 World Aquatics Championships
- One representative from each World Aquatics continent (Africa, the Americas, Asia, Europe, and Oceania) (Note: If a continental place was not used, the slot was reallocated to the fastest unqualified swimmer at the 2024 World Aquatics Championships.)
- One representative from the host nation (France) if not qualified by other means (Note: If a French swimmer already qualified, their slot was reallocated to the fastest unqualified swimmer at the 2024 World Aquatics Championships.)

In addition to the athletes invited to fulfil the quota, any athletes who achieved the Olympic Qualification Time in either the 800 or 1500 metres freestyle were invited to compete, provided their respective NOC had not already entered two athletes.

== Background ==
Germany's Florian Wellbrock won the event at the previous Olympics, and he also won gold at the 2023 World Championships. Hungary's Kristóf Rasovszky won silver at the previous Olympics. Italy's Gregorio Paltrinieri won the event at the 2022 World Championships and had won six gold medals at open water events at the European Championships. He also won silver in the 1500 metres freestyle event earlier in the Games. Ireland's Daniel Wiffen won the 800 metres freestyle event earlier in the Olympics, and won bronze in the 1500 freestyle.

David Johnston of the US withdrew from the event after testing positive for COVID-19 earlier in the week, and Sweden's Victor Johansson withdrew due to his doctor's recommendation.

== Water quality issues ==
France spent €1.4–1.6 billion to clean up the Seine for the Olympic triathlons and marathon swimming events, (Note: Sources give conflicting figures between 1.4 and 1.6 billion euros.) but heavy rain in the lead-up to the Olympics caused bacteria levels to increase. Earlier in the Olympics, two consecutive training sessions for the triathlons were cancelled, and after the triathlon events took place, a few of the competitors reported infections caused by E. coli—a bacterium that was being monitored in the Seine. The Paris 2024 organisers later released a statement saying that "Paris 2024 wishes to remind everyone that the health and wellbeing of athletes is our top priority".

A session in the river was scheduled to take place on 6 August, when the athletes would practice and acclimatize to the river's conditions. However, it was cancelled hours beforehand due to high enterococci levels. A day after, on 7 August, the acclimatization session went ahead, and the race took place on 9 August.

== Race ==
The race was held at 07:30 on 9 August and consisted of six 1.67 kilometer loops between Pont Alexandre III and Pont de l'Alma. At the end of each loop, at Pont Alexandre III, there was a feeding station, where athletes could collect food and drink. When travelling from Pont Alexandre III to Pont de l'Alma, the athletes were swimming downstream, but on the way back they were swimming upstream. After the race, Ireland's Daniel Wiffen stated that he had to swim at a pace faster than approximately 1:12 minutes per 100 metres to be able to swim forward against the current.

Hungary's Kristóf Rasovszky took first place off the start, but Wellbrock overtook him two-thirds of the way into the downstream leg of the first lap and maintained his lead until the feeding station at the end of the first lap. Rasovszky once again led for the downstream portion of the second lap, and he maintained his lead until the end of lap three. Wellbrock took the lead again into lap four, but Rasovszky once again overtook him during the upstream portion.

During the final feeding station, going into the final lap, Wellbrock swam wide around the bend, which relegated him from second to seventh. He was unable to swim himself back into a podium position for the rest of the race. Going into the sixth and final lap, Rasovszky was first, followed by Germany's Oliver Klemet. Rasovszky and Klemet broke away from the rest of the swimmers until the final upstream portion, when they were briefly caught by the chasing group of swimmers led by Hungary's Dávid Betlehem and Italy's Domenico Acerenza. Rasovszky and Klemet sprinted in what Reuters called a "gruelling slog" to the finish, and Rasovszky beat Klemet by 2.1 seconds to finish first with a time of 1:50:52.7; Klemet finished second with 1:50:54.8. Betlehem beat Acerenza by 0.6 seconds for third, finishing in 1:51:09.0; Acerenza finished in 1:51:09.6 for fourth.

After the race, Rasovszky said that he felt like his training with Betlehem in the Danube River in Hungary gave them an advantage. Rasovszky, Betlehem and Wiffen all expressed a lack of concern for the water quality issues after the race.

Results
Rank	Swimmer	Nation	Time
1st place, gold medalist(s)	Kristóf Rasovszky	Hungary	1:50:52.7
2nd place, silver medalist(s)	Oliver Klemet	Germany	1:50:54.8
3rd place, bronze medalist(s)	Dávid Betlehem	Hungary	1:51:09.0
4	Domenico Acerenza	Italy	1:51:09.6
5	Logan Fontaine	France	1:51:47.9
6	Hector Pardoe	Great Britain	1:51:50.8
7	Marc-Antoine Olivier	France	1:51:50.9
8	Florian Wellbrock	Germany	1:51:54.4
9	Gregorio Paltrinieri	Italy	1:51:58.0
10	Athanasios Charalampos Kynigakis	Greece	1:52:37.2
11	Nicholas Sloman	Australia	1:56:24.4
12	Paulo Strehlke	Mexico	1:56:28.4
13	Kyle Lee	Australia	1:56:42.5
14	Toby Robinson	Great Britain	1:56:43.0
15	Taishin Minamide	Japan	1:56:57.3
16	Matan Roditi	Israel	1:57:02.3
17	David Farinango	Ecuador	1:57:08.6
18	Daniel Wiffen	Ireland	1:57:20.1
19	Ivan Puskovitch	United States	1:57:52.5
20	Martin Straka	Czech Republic	1:57:52.9
21	Jan Hercog	Austria	2:01:03.8
22	Piotr Woźniak	Poland	2:02:38.6
23	Kuzey Tunçelli	Turkey	2:02:58.1
24	Felix Auböck	Austria	2:03:00.5
25	Henrik Christiansen	Norway	2:03:38.2
	Guilherme Costa	Brazil	DNF
	Carlos Garach Benito	Spain	DNF
	Phillip Seidler	Namibia	DNF
	Emir Batur Albayrak	Turkey	DNF
	Victor Johansson	Sweden	DNS
	Ahmed Jaouadi	Tunisia	DNS
