= Open water swimming at the 2026 European Aquatics Championships – Men's 3 km knockout sprint =

Men's 3 km knockout sprint at the 2026 European Aquatics Championships
- Venue: River Seine
- Dates: 7 August
- Competitors: 37 from 19 nations
- Winning time: 6:12.97

Medalists
| gold medal | Dávid Betlehem | Hungary |
| silver medal | Marc-Antoine Olivier | France |
| bronze medal | Logan Fontaine | France |

The Men's 3 km knockout sprint competition at the 2026 European Aquatics Championships was held on 7 August 2026.

== Results ==
=== Round 1 ===
The first round was started at 11:15.

Heat 1

| Rank | Swimmer | Nationality | Time | Notes |
|---|---|---|---|---|
| 1 | Johannes Liebmann | Germany | 15:22.06 | Q |
| 2 | Kristóf Rasovszky | Hungary | 15:27.59 | Q |
| 3 | Domenico Acerenza | Italy | 15:29.37 | Q |
| 4 | Vladimir Muratov | Neutral Athletes B | 15:33.83 | Q |
| 5 | Marc-Antoine Olivier | France | 15:34.59 | Q |
| 6 | Émile Vincent | France | 15:34.65 | Q |
| 7 | Gregorio Paltrinieri | Italy | 15:34.67 | Q |
| 8 | Athanasios Kynigakis | Greece | 15:34.79 | Q |
| 9 | Paul Niederberger | Switzerland | 15:34.79 | Q |
| 10 | Yonatan Ahdut | Israel | 15:35.40 | Q |
| 11 | Martin Straka | Czechia | 15:35.60 | |
| 12 | Aleksandr Stepanov | Neutral Athletes B | 15:35.87 | |
| 13 | Muhammed Yavuz Selim Oğuz | Turkey | 15:38.82 | |
| 14 | Jakub Gabriel | Slovakia | 15:39.08 | |
| 15 | Jesper Lietzen | Finland | 15:42.31 | |
| 16 | Nolan Carrel | Switzerland | 15:46.84 | |
| 17 | Tomáš Peciar | Slovakia | 16:16.06 | |
| 18 | Théo Druenne | Monaco | 16:35.27 | |
| | Jaan Pasko | Estonia | Did not finish | |

Heat 2

| Rank | Swimmer | Nationality | Time | Notes |
|---|---|---|---|---|
| 1 | Florian Wellbrock | Germany | 15:26.00 | Q |
| 2 | Dávid Betlehem | Hungary | 15:26.27 | Q |
| 3 | Oliver Klemet | Germany | 15:26.73 | Q |
| 4 | Mateo García | Spain | 15:28.91 | Q |
| 5 | Andrea Filadelli | Italy | 15:29.83 | Q |
| 6 | Logan Fontaine | France | 15:31.78 | Q |
| 7 | Luca Karl | Austria | 15:33.46 | Q |
| 8 | Vladimir Ivanov | Neutral Athletes B | 15:33.67 | Q |
| 9 | Bartosz Kapała | Poland | 15:34.32 | Q |
| 10 | Diogo Cardoso | Portugal | 15:36.82 | Q |
| 11 | Christian Schreiber | Switzerland | 15:37.20 | |
| 12 | Mario Méndez | Spain | 15:37.39 | |
| 13 | Denis Borovka | Czechia | 15:47.10 | |
| 14 | Esteban Faure | Monaco | 15:47.15 | |
| 15 | Petar Cekov | North Macedonia | 16:04.89 | |
| 16 | Emir Batur Albayrak | Turkey | 16:19.38 | |
| 17 | Doğukan Ulaç | Turkey | 16:31.84 | |
| 18 | Erik Mäesepp | Estonia | 17:05.87 | |
| | Hunor Kovács-Seres | Hungary | Did not start | |

=== Round 2 ===
The second round was started at 12:05.

Semifinal 1

| Rank | Swimmer | Nationality | Time | Notes |
|---|---|---|---|---|
| 1 | Johannes Liebmann | Germany | 10:46.55 | Q |
| 2 | Gregorio Paltrinieri | Italy | 10:46.60 | Q |
| 3 | Marc-Antoine Olivier | France | 10:49.51 | Q |
| 4 | Athanasios Kynigakis | Greece | 10:50.39 | Q |
| 5 | Kristóf Rasovszky | Hungary | 10:50.51 | Q |
| 6 | Domenico Acerenza | Italy | 10:51.07 | |
| 7 | Émile Vincent | France | 10:58.15 | |
| 8 | Vladimir Muratov | Neutral Athletes B | 10:59.17 | |
| 9 | Yonatan Ahdut | Israel | 10:59.19 | |
| 10 | Paul Niederberger | Switzerland | 13:47.44 | |

Semifinal 2

| Rank | Swimmer | Nationality | Time | Notes |
|---|---|---|---|---|
| 1 | Oliver Klemet | Germany | 10:56.54 | Q |
| 2 | Florian Wellbrock | Germany | 10:57.37 | Q |
| 3 | Dávid Betlehem | Hungary | 10:57.68 | Q |
| 4 | Andrea Filadelli | Italy | 10:58.92 | Q |
| 5 | Logan Fontaine | France | 10:59.62 | Q |
| 6 | Bartosz Kapała | Poland | 10:59.66 | |
| 7 | Mateo García | Spain | 10:59.82 | |
| 8 | Luca Karl | Austria | 11:00.16 | |
| 9 | Diogo Cardoso | Portugal | 11:03.87 | |
| 10 | Vladimir Ivanov | Neutral Athletes B | 11:03.96 | |

=== Round 3 ===
The third round was started at 12:37.

| Rank | Swimmer | Nationality | Time |
|---|---|---|---|
| 1st place, gold medalist(s) | Dávid Betlehem | Hungary | 6:12.97 |
| 2nd place, silver medalist(s) | Marc-Antoine Olivier | France | 6:16.26 |
| 3rd place, bronze medalist(s) | Logan Fontaine | France | 6:16.44 |
| 4 | Gregorio Paltrinieri | Italy | 6:17.00 |
| 5 | Kristóf Rasovszky | Hungary | 6:17.08 |
| 6 | Athanasios Kynigakis | Greece | 6:18.16 |
| 7 | Florian Wellbrock | Germany | 6:18.88 |
| 8 | Johannes Liebmann | Germany | 6:19.80 |
| 9 | Oliver Klemet | Germany | 6:20.25 |
| 10 | Andrea Filadelli | Italy | 6:29.65 |
