= Open water swimming at the 2026 European Aquatics Championships – Men's 10 km =

Men's 10 km at the 2026 European Aquatics Championships
- Venue: River Seine
- Dates: 4 August
- Competitors: 34 from 19 nations
- Winning time: 1:55:18.39

Medalists
gold medal	Florian Wellbrock	Germany
silver medal	Dávid Betlehem	Hungary
bronze medal	Oliver Klemet	Germany

The Men's 10 km competition at the 2026 European Aquatics Championships was held on 4 August 2026.

== Results ==
The race was started at 10:00.

Rank	Swimmer	Nationality	Time
1st place, gold medalist(s)	Florian Wellbrock	Germany	1:55:18.39
2nd place, silver medalist(s)	Dávid Betlehem	Hungary	1:55:20.53
3rd place, bronze medalist(s)	Oliver Klemet	Germany	1:55:24.84
4	Gregorio Paltrinieri	Italy	1:55:34.81
5	Marcello Guidi	Italy	1:55:36.79
6	Hector Pardoe	Great Britain	1:55:43.31
7	Andrea Filadelli	Italy	1:55:46.89
8	Luca Karl	Austria	1:55:48.76
9	Logan Fontaine	France	1:55:49.17
10	Marc-Antoine Olivier	France	1:55:52.30
11	Athanasios Kynigakis	Greece	1:56:05.46
12	Paul Niederberger	Switzerland	1:56:07.02
13	Mario Méndez	Spain	1:56:07.10
14	Logan Vanhuys	Belgium	1:56:07.64
15	Bartosz Kapała	Poland	1:56:12.51
16	Hunor Kovács-Seres	Hungary	1:56:15.21
17	Mateo García	Spain	1:56:19.66
18	Martin Straka	Czechia	1:56:22.28
19	Denis Borovka	Czechia	1:57:07.42
20	Muhammed Yavuz Selim Oğuz	Turkey	1:57:09.20
21	Sacha Velly	France	1:57:10.15
22	Diogo Cardoso	Portugal	1:57:13.64
23	Kristóf Rasovszky	Hungary	1:58:02.32
24	Christian Schreiber	Switzerland	1:58:47.09
25	Yonatan Ahdut	Israel	1:58:55.58
26	Denis Adeev	Neutral Athletes B	1:59:41.95
27	Jakub Gabriel	Slovakia	1:59:50.94
28	Vladimir Ivanov	Neutral Athletes B	2:03:08.03
29	Francisco Amaral	Portugal	2:05:41.69
30	Petar Cekov	North Macedonia	2:05:48.82
31	Doğukan Ulaç	Turkey	2:09:34.66
	Jaan Pasko	Estonia	Did not finish
	Nolan Carrel	Switzerland	Did not finish
	Aleksandr Stepanov	Neutral Athletes B	Did not finish
