= Open water swimming at the 2025 World Aquatics Championships – Men's 3 km knockout sprint =

Men's 3 km knockout sprints at the 2025 World Aquatics Championships
- Venue: Sentosa Island
- Location: Singapore
- Dates: 19 July
- Competitors: 61 from 36 nations
- Winning time: 5:46.0

Medalists
gold medal	Florian Wellbrock	Germany
silver medal	Dávid Betlehem	Hungary
bronze medal	Marc-Antoine Olivier	France

The men's 3 km knockout sprints competition at the 2025 World Aquatics Championships was held on 19 July 2025 off the coast of Palawan Beach, Sentosa. It was the first time this event was held at the World Championships.

Germany's Florian Wellbrock was the favourite to win the event. He won all three rounds to win gold, while Hungary's Dávid Betlehem won silver and France's Marc-Antoine Olivier won bronze. Wellbrock's win made him the first athlete to win three open water swimming golds at a World Championships. The athletes generally said they enjoyed the new racing format.

== Event description ==
The event featured three rounds of swimming in the open water – the heats, semifinal and final. The slower swimmers were eliminated after each round.

The heats consisted of two 1500-metre races, and the top ten finishers of each race qualified for the semifinal. The semifinal consisted of a single 1000-metre race, from which the top ten finishers qualified for the final. The final was a 500-metre sprint which determined the finishing positions. Each round consisted of a single four-corner loop. The loop was sized according to the distance of the round. (Note: For example, in the second round, the four-corner loop was 1000 m long.) The event took place off the coast of Palawan Beach, Sentosa.

== Background ==
Germany's Florian Wellbrock was the favourite to win the event, having recorded the fastest pool 1500 m time of 2025. Wellbrock was also the winner of the 10 km and 5 km events earlier in the Championships. Hungary's Kristóf Rasovszky, the 10 km Olympic champion, won the event at the European Championships earlier in the year, while Germany's Oliver Klemet and Hungary's Dávid Betlehem had won the event at stops of the 2025 World Cup. Also in contention were France's Logan Fontaine and Marc-Antoine Olivier, and Italy's Matteo Diodato.

This was the first time this event was held at the World Aquatics Championships. The event was first seen at the 2024 World Junior Open Water Championships. It had also taken place at the 2025 European Open Water Championships and at two of the stops of the 2025 Open Water Swimming World Cup.

== Qualification ==
Each World Aquatics member federation could enter up to two athletes.

== Heats ==
The heats were held on 19 July at 10:00 SGT. Florian Wellbrock was in heat 2, while Italy's Gregorio Paltrinieri was in heat 1. Oliver Klemet and Dávid Betlehem, who had both won the event at stops of the 2025 Open Water Swimming World Cup, were in heat 2.

=== Heat 1 ===
Italy's Matteo Diodato won, while Australia's Thomas Raymond and Paltrinieri finished second and third respectively.

Results
Rank	Swimmer	Nationality	Time	Notes
1	Matteo Diodato	Italy	17:00.9	Q
2	Thomas Raymond	Australia	17:03.8	Q
3	Gregorio Paltrinieri	Italy	17:03.9	Q
4	Martin Straka	Czech Republic	17:06.2	Q
5	Ivan Puskovitch	United States	17:08.8	Q
6	Logan Fontaine	France	17:08.9	Q
7	Eric Brown	Canada	17:10.1	Q
8	Lev Cherepanov	Kazakhstan	17:11.4	Q
9	Christian Schreiber	Switzerland	17:11.5	Q
10	Vladislav Utrobin	Neutral Athletes B	17:11.5	Q
11	Joaquín Moreno	Argentina	17:13.1	
12	Park Jae-hun	South Korea	17:13.9	
13	Kaito Tsujimori	Japan	17:16.6	
14	Matthew Caldwell	South Africa	17:45.4	
15	Su Bo-ling	Chinese Taipei	17:45.4	
16	Oh Se-beom	South Korea	17:48.4	
17	Artyom Lukasevits	Singapore	17:50.0	
18	Ilias El Fallaki	Morocco	17:57.9	
19	Louis Clark	New Zealand	17:58.4	
20	Galymzhan Balabek	Kazakhstan	18:01.9	
21	Diego Dulieu	Honduras	18:03.1	
22	Atakan Ercan	Turkey	18:03.2	
23	Keith Sin	Hong Kong	18:03.8	
24	Théo Druenne	Monaco	18:16.9	
25	Luke Tan	Singapore	18:53.3	
25	Jeison Rojas	Costa Rica	18:53.3	
27	Chan Tsun Hin	Hong Kong	19:34.8	
28	Juan Núñez	Dominican Republic	19:38.5	
29	Tristan Nell	Namibia	20:38.1	
30	Tharusha Perera	Sri Lanka	21:49.9	
31	Aryan Joseph	Kenya	23:33.8	
32	Swaleh Talib	Kenya	24:26.7	
	Piotr Woźniak	Poland	Did not start	

=== Heat 2 ===
Betlehem took an early lead, and he and Wellbrock finished in the top two spots with more than a two-second lead ahead of the rest of the swimmers. Australia's Nicholas Sloman finished third, and France's Marc-Antoine Olivier and Klemet also qualified.

Results
Rank	Swimmer	Nationality	Time	Notes
1	Florian Wellbrock	Germany	17:00.4	Q
2	Dávid Betlehem	Hungary	17:01.4	Q
3	Nicholas Sloman	Australia	17:03.9	Q
4	Marc-Antoine Olivier	France	17:05.0	Q
5	Kristóf Rasovszky	Hungary	17:05.0	Q
6	Oliver Klemet	Germany	17:05.7	Q
7	Paul Niederberger	Switzerland	17:06.9	Q
8	Athanasios Kynigakis	Greece	17:08.2	Q
9	Dylan Gravley	United States	17:08.6	Q
10	Luca Karl	Austria	17:08.7	Q
11	Ratthawit Thammananthachote	Thailand	17:10.1	
12	Konstantinos Chourdakis	Greece	17:10.3	
13	Matheus Melecchi	Brazil	17:10.7	
14	Savelii Luzin	Neutral Athletes B	17:11.1	
15	Luiz Loureiro	Brazil	17:13.0	
16	Bartosz Kapała	Poland	17:14.2	
17	Emre Sarp Zeytinoğlu	Turkey	17:41.5	
18	Lan Tianchen	China	17:47.9	
19	Nico Esslinger	Namibia	17:52.4	
20	Connor Buck	South Africa	17:54.1	
21	Tsao Jun-yan	Chinese Taipei	18:13.7	
22	Zhang Jinhou	China	18:13.8	
23	Richard Urban	Slovakia	18:15.9	
24	Esteban Faure	Monaco	18:23.3	
25	Jakub Gabriel	Slovakia	18:23.8	
26	Prashans Hiremagalur	India	18:40.9	
27	Riku Takaki	Japan	18:46.6	
28	Army Pal	India	19:42.0	
29	Joaquín Estigarribia	Paraguay	20:24.0	
	Adrian Ywanaga	Peru	Did not start	
	Jamarr Bruno	Puerto Rico	Did not start	
	Rami Rahmouni	Tunisia	Did not start	

== Semifinal ==
The semifinal was held at 10:50. Wellbrock led from the beginning to finish first, and Betlehem followed him for second. They were followed by a tight pack of swimmers, and photo analysis was required to determine which of the top seventeen swimmers made it through.

Results
Rank	Swimmer	Nationality	Time	Notes
1	Florian Wellbrock	Germany	11:27.2	Q
2	Dávid Betlehem	Hungary	11:27.8	Q
3	Thomas Raymond	Australia	11:28.1	Q
4	Marc-Antoine Olivier	France	11:29.2	Q
5	Gregorio Paltrinieri	Italy	11:30.4	Q
6	Logan Fontaine	France	11:30.8	Q
7	Ivan Puskovitch	United States	11:31.8	Q
8	Martin Straka	Czech Republic	11:31.9	Q
9	Kristóf Rasovszky	Hungary	11:32.6	Q
9	Nicholas Sloman	Australia	11:32.6	Q
11	Eric Brown	Canada	11:33.1	
12	Luca Karl	Austria	11:33.2	
13	Paul Niederberger	Switzerland	11:34.1	
14	Christian Schreiber	Switzerland	11:34.2	
15	Vladislav Utrobin	Neutral Athletes B	11:34.3	
16	Matteo Diodato	Italy	11:34.7	
17	Oliver Klemet	Germany	11:34.9	
18	Athanasios Kynigakis	Greece	11:35.8	
19	Dylan Gravley	United States	11:37.7	
20	Lev Cherepanov	Kazakhstan	12:00.4	

== Final ==
The final was held at 11:00. Wellbrock led from the beginning to the end to win with a time of 5:46.0. Betlehem was chasing him for most of the race, and he finished in second with 5:47.7. Olivier finished third with 5:51.1, over seven seconds ahead of Paltrinieri in fourth.

Wellbrock's win, along with his wins in the 5 km and 10 km, meant he had won all the individual open water swimming events at the Championships. He also won every stage of the knockout event, meaning he hadn't yet lost a race. This win also made him the first athlete to win three open water swimming golds at a World Championships.

The athletes generally said they enjoyed the new racing format. Betlehem said he was "very happy" with the format, while Wellbrock said "it was so much fun, especially at the end, when I could just jump in and go all out."

Results
Rank	Swimmer	Nationality	Time
1st place, gold medalist(s)	Florian Wellbrock	Germany	5:46.0
2nd place, silver medalist(s)	Dávid Betlehem	Hungary	5:47.7
3rd place, bronze medalist(s)	Marc-Antoine Olivier	France	5:51.1
4	Gregorio Paltrinieri	Italy	5:58.9
5	Thomas Raymond	Australia	5:59.0
6	Kristóf Rasovszky	Hungary	6:06.0
7	Ivan Puskovitch	United States	6:07.2
8	Logan Fontaine	France	6:07.2
9	Martin Straka	Czech Republic	6:08.6
10	Nicholas Sloman	Australia	6:10.3
