= 2022 FINA Marathon Swim World Series =

International swimming competition

- Date: 28 May – 12 November 2022
- Competitors: 174 from 36 nations

The 2022 FINA Marathon Swim World Series began on 28 May 2022 in Setúbal, Portugal for the first leg and ended in Eilat, Israel on 12 November 2022 for the fifth and final leg. It was the 16th edition of the FINA-sanctioned series. The 4×1500 metre mixed relay event was brought back after its debut at the final leg of the 2021 FINA Marathon Swim World Series and as part of the Abu Dhabi Aquatics Festival.

Officials and athletes from Russia and Belarus were banned from the entirety of the World Series due to the Russian invasion of Ukraine.

== Calendar ==
The calendar for the 2022 World Series, was scheduled by FINA to include five legs.

Leg	Dates	Location	# athletes	# countries	Notes
1	28–29 May^{[a]}	Albarquel, Setúbal, Portugal	67	16	
2	9–10 July	Parc de la Villette, Paris, France	89	26	
3	26–28 August	Lake Mégantic, Lac-Mégantic, Canada	37	11	
4	7–9 October	Fajardo, Puerto Rico	–	–	Cancelled
5	11–12 November	Gulf of Eilat, Eilat, Israel	94	25	

^{a} For leg 1, men and women raced the 10 kilometre course at the same time on 28 May, with a staggered start of men starting approximately ten minutes before the women.

== Points and standings ==
At each stop of the World Series, the top ten finishers in the 10 kilometre events earned points for the place finish, overall standings and winners were determined by the total number of points each athlete has earned across all stops.

=== Men ===
Rank	Name	Country / Federation	Points					Overall
Rank	Name	Country / Federation	Setúbal	Paris	Lac-Mégantic	Fajardo	Eliat	Overall
1	Kristóf Rasovszky	Hungary	600	700	550	–	550	2400
1	Gregorio Paltrinieri	Italy	800	800	–	–	800	2400
3	Dávid Betlehem	Hungary	400	550	600	–	600	2150
4	Domenico Acerenza	Italy	700	–	800	–	500	2000
5	Andrea Manzi	Italy	250	500	500	–	450	1700
6	Nicholas Sloman	Australia	–	600	700	–	200	1500
6	Dario Verani	Italy	500	200	400	–	400	1500
8	Matteo Furlan	Italy	0	350	450	–	250	1050
9	Marcello Guidi	Italy	550	–	190	–	–	740
10	Logan Vanhuys	Belgium	150	140	300	–	110	700
10	Marc-Antoine Olivier	France	0	–	0	–	700	700

=== Women ===
Rank	Name	Country / Federation	Points					Overall
Rank	Name	Country / Federation	Setúbal	Paris	Lac-Mégantic	Fajardo	Eliat	Overall
1	Ana Marcela Cunha	Brazil	800	800	600	–	700	2900
2	Sharon van Rouwendaal	Netherlands	700	700	800	–	500	2700
3	Ginevra Taddeucci	Italy	550	600	700	–	300	2150
4	Leonie Beck	Germany	500	–	190	–	600	1290
5	Viviane Jungblut	Brazil	–	550	500	–	180	1230
6	Chelsea Gubecka	Australia	–	400	–	–	800	1200
7	Barbara Pozzobon	Italy	300	450	350	–	92	1192
8	Jeannette Spiwoks	Germany	600	200	–	–	250	1050
9	Giulia Gabbrielleschi	Italy	450	0	550	–	–	1000
10	Lea Boy	Germany	400	140	300	–	150	990

=== Points and prize money breakdown ===
Points and prize money for each leg and prize money for overall place were broken down as follows:

Place →	1st	2nd	3rd	4th	5th	6th	7th	8th	9th	10th
Per leg (Setúbal, Paris, Lac-Mégantic, Fajardo, Eilat)
Points	800	700	600	550	500	450	400	350	300	250
Prize money (US$)	3,500	3,000	2,500	1,700	1,500	1,200	950	650	–	–
Overall winners
Prize money (US$)	50,000	35,000	25,500	20,000	15,000	12,000	8,500	5,000	3,500	1,500

== Medal summary ==
=== Men 10 km ===
Event	Gold		Silver		Bronze	
Setúbal	Gregorio Paltrinieri (ITA)	1:53:45.40	Domenico Acerenza (ITA)	1:53:47.20	Kristóf Rasovszky (HUN)	1:53:52.10
Paris	Gregorio Paltrinieri (ITA)	1:51:37.85	Kristóf Rasovszky (HUN)	1:51:38.98	Nicholas Sloman (AUS)	1:51:41.95
Lac-Mégantic	Domenico Acerenza (ITA)	1:50:50.83	Nicholas Sloman (AUS)	1:50:51.68	Dávid Betlehem (HUN)	1:50:52.00
Fajardo	Cancelled					
Eilat	Gregorio Paltrinieri (ITA)	1:46:41.80	Marc-Antoine Olivier (FRA)	1:46:43.40	Dávid Betlehem (HUN)	1:46:44.20

=== Women 10 km ===
Event	Gold		Silver		Bronze	
Setúbal	Ana Marcela Cunha (BRA)	2:09:29.80	Sharon van Rouwendaal (NED)	2:09:32.30	Jeannette Spiwoks (GER)	2:09:32.40
Paris	Ana Marcela Cunha (BRA)	2:00:33.71	Sharon van Rouwendaal (NED)	2:00:35.77	Ginevra Taddeucci (ITA)	2:00:35.99
Lac-Mégantic	Sharon van Rouwendaal (NED)	2:01:09.70	Ginevra Taddeucci (ITA)	2:01:10.04	Ana Marcela Cunha (BRA)	2:01:11.00
Fajardo	Cancelled					
Eilat	Chelsea Gubecka (AUS)	1:56:19.80	Ana Marcela Cunha (BRA)	1:56:23.60	Leonie Beck (GER)	1:56:25.30

=== Mixed 4×1500 m relay ===
Event	Gold		Silver		Bronze	
Setúbal	Italy; Giulia Gabbrielleschi; Ginevra Taddeucci; Marcello Guidi; Mario Sanzullo	1:12:27.00	Italy; Martina De Memme; Barbara Pozzobon; Domenico Acerenza; Gregorio Paltrinieri	1:12:29.00	Hungary; Reka Rohacs; Anna Olasz; Dávid Betlehem; Kristóf Rasovszky	1:13:21.00
Paris	Italy; Giulia Gabbrielleschi; Martina De Memme; Dario Verani; Gregorio Paltrinieri	1:07:51.74	Australia; Moesha Johnson; Kareena Lee; Nicholas Sloman; Kyle Lee	1:08:03.75	Italy; Ginevra Taddeucci; Barbara Pozzobon; Pasquale Sanzullo; Andrea Manzi	1:08:03.75
Lac-Mégantic	Not held					
Fajardo	Cancelled					
Eilat	France; Aurelie Muller; Lisa Pou; David Aubry; Marc-Antoine Olivier	1:06:35.40	Australia; Bianca Crisp; Chelsea Gubecka; Nicholas Sloman; Kyle Lee	1:06:36.60	Italy; Rachele Bruni; Martina De Memme; Dario Verani; Gregorio Paltrinieri	1:06:37.00

=== Medal table ===
Rank	Nation	Gold	Silver	Bronze	Total
1	Italy (ITA)	6	3	3	12
2	Brazil (BRA)	2	1	1	4
3	Australia (AUS)	1	3	1	5
4	Netherlands (NED)	1	2	0	3
5	France (FRA)	1	1	0	2
6	Hungary (HUN)	0	1	4	5
7	Germany (GER)	0	0	2	2
Totals (7 entries)		11	11	11	33

== Participating nations ==
Athletes from the following countries participated at the World Series.

- Argentina (4)
- Australia (19)
- Austria (1)
- Belgium (2)
- Bolivia (1)
- Brazil (8)
- Canada (8)
- Chinese Taipei (2)
- Croatia (1)
- Czech Republic (4)
- Ecuador (2)
- France (17)
- Germany (9)
- Great Britain (2)
- Greece (4)
- Hong Kong (4)
- Hungary (13)
- Israel (6)
- Italy (15)
- Japan (7)
- Lebanon (2)
- Monaco (1)
- Netherlands (5)
- New Zealand (1)
- Peru (1)
- Poland (1)
- Portugal (5)
- San Marino (1)
- Slovenia (1)
- South Korea (1)
- Spain (8)
- Sweden (1)
- Switzerland (3)
- Ukraine (1)
- United States (12)
- Venezuela (1)

== National Swimming Federation withdrawals ==
On 23 March 2022, FINA announced that for the remaining duration of the 2022 year, the Russian Swimming Federation had withdrawn its athletes from all FINA events, which included the Marathon Swim World Series. On 21 April 2022, FINA banned all Belarusian and Russian athletes and officials from all FINA events through the end of 2022, including the World Series, attributing the intentional exclusion of these countries to the Russian invasion of Ukraine.
