= 2023 FINA Open Water Tour =

Swimming world cup

- Date: 8 May – 2 December 2023

The 2023 FINA Open Water Tour, also called 2023 World Aquatics Open Water Swimming World Cup, started on 8 May 2023 in Egypt for the first leg and is scheduled to end in Eilat, Israel on 2 December 2023 for the fifth and final leg. It is the 17th edition of the FINA-sanctioned FINA Marathon Swim World Series.

For this 17th edition of the series, FINA implemented a name change from the previous edition, introducing the name FINA Open Water Tour in place of the former name FINA Marathon Swim World Series. On 19 March 2023, World Aquatics introduced a second name for the event, 2023 World Aquatics Open Water Swimming World Cup. On 5 April 2023, World Aquatics announced its bans on Russian and Belarusian athletes from 2022, not allowing them to compete at World Aquatics events, was in effect indefinitely, meaning they were banned from competing at the Open Water Tour.

== Calendar ==
The calendar for the 2023 Tour was originally scheduled in November 2022 by FINA to include six legs. On 19 March 2023, World Aquatics announced a modified schedule adding a leg in Egypt and removing the legs in Taiwan and Hong Kong from the 2023 tour without explanation. The first leg of the tour is part of the multi-sport (open water swimming, water polo, artistic swimming) Egypt Aquatics Festival, which is the successor to the first FINA Aquatics Festival edition (the Abu Dhabi Aquatics Festival, held in 2021).

Leg	Dates	Location
1^{[a]}	8–9 May	Soma Bay, Red Sea, Egypt
2	20–21 May	Golfo Aranci, Sardinia, Italy
3	27–28 May	Albarquel, Setúbal, Portugal
4	5–6 August	Seine, Paris, France
n/a^{[b]}	28–29 October	Sun Moon Lake, Taiwan
n/a^{[b]}	4–5 November	Hong Kong
5	1–2 December	Gulf of Eilat, Eilat, Israel

^{a} Part of the Egypt Aquatics Festival.
^{b} Leg cancelled by World Aquatics without explanation.

== Medal summary ==
=== Men 10 km ===
Event	Gold		Silver		Bronze	
Egypt	Florian Wellbrock (GER)	1:52:53.20	Marc-Antoine Olivier (FRA)	1:52:53.30	Logan Fontaine (FRA)	1:52:55.00
Sardinia	Kristóf Rasovszky (HUN)	1:47:17.60	Domenico Acerenza (ITA)	1:47:20.10	Oliver Klemet (GER)	1:47:20.50
Setúbal	Andrea Manzi (ITA)	1:52:37.10	Marcello Guidi (ITA)	1:52:41.70	Dávid Betlehem (HUN)	1:53:12.10
Paris						
Eilat						

=== Women 10 km ===
Event	Gold		Silver		Bronze	
Egypt	Leonie Beck (GER)	2:04:04.60	Sharon van Rouwendaal (NED)	2:04:07.30	Ana Marcela Cunha (BRA)	2:04:11.00
Sardinia	Leonie Beck (GER)	1:56:17.40	Ginevra Taddeucci (ITA)	1:56:18.60	Giulia Gabbrielleschi (ITA)	1:56:20.50
Setúbal	Caroline Jouisse (FRA)	2:01:12.10	Arianna Bridi (ITA) Sharon van Rouwendaal (NED)	2:01:13.00	none awarded	
Paris						
Eilat						

=== Mixed 4×1500 m relay ===
Event	Gold		Silver		Bronze	
Egypt	Germany	1:02:50.10	France	1:03:48.50	Egypt	1:08:45.60
Sardinia	Germany	1:04:57.70	Italy	1:04:58.60	France	1:05:30.00
Setúbal	Hungary	1:24:13.10	Italy	1:25:32.60	France	1:27:55.00
Paris						
Eilat						

=== Medal table ===
Rank	Nation	Gold	Silver	Bronze	Total
1	Germany (GER)	5	0	1	6
2	Hungary (HUN)	2	0	1	3
3	Italy (ITA)	1	6	1	8
4	France (FRA)	1	2	3	6
5	Netherlands (NED)	0	2	0	2
6	Brazil (BRA)	0	0	1	1
6	Egypt (EGY)	0	0	1	1
Totals (7 entries)		9	10	8	27
