= Open water swimming at the 2024 European Aquatics Championships – Men's 5 km =

Men's 5 km at the 2024 European Aquatics Championships
- Venue: Ada Ciganlija
- Dates: 13 June
- Competitors: 29 from 14 nations
- Winning time: 53:28.3

Medalists
gold medal	Dávid Betlehem	Hungary
silver medal	Marc-Antoine Olivier	France
bronze medal	Marcello Guidi	Italy

The Men's 5 km competition at the 2024 European Aquatics Championships was held on 13 June.

== Results ==
The race was started at 09:00.

Rank	Swimmer	Nationality	Time
1st place, gold medalist(s)	Dávid Betlehem	Hungary	53:28.3
2nd place, silver medalist(s)	Marc-Antoine Olivier	France	53:28.7
3rd place, bronze medalist(s)	Marcello Guidi	Italy	53:30.8
4	Sacha Velly	France	53:32.9
5	Athanasios Kynigakis	Greece	53:35.0
6	Kristóf Rasovszky	Hungary	53:36.7
7	Andrea Filadelli	Italy	53:38.4
8	Niklas Frach	Germany	53:39.3
9	Vincenzo Caso	Italy	53:45.3
10	Marin Mogić	Croatia	54:53.8
11	Alejandro Puebla	Spain	54:59.8
12	Christian Schreiber	Switzerland	55:09.6
13	Arshak Hambardzumyan	Hungary	55:11.7
14	Noah Lerch	Germany	55:15.4
15	Paul Niederberger	Switzerland	55:16.2
16	Diogo Cardoso	Portugal	55:16.2
17	Guillem Pujol	Spain	55:16.5
18	Adam Mróz	Poland	55:19.4
19	Jean-Baptiste Clusman	France	55:19.9
20	Piotr Woźniak	Poland	55:20.3
21	Jonas Kusche	Germany	55:20.3
22	Mario Méndez	Spain	55:30.1
23	Ioannis Skaris	Greece	57:19.7
24	Claudio Lorenzetti	Switzerland	57:20.1
25	Martin Straka	Czech Republic	57:21.6
26	Patrick Eremija	Croatia	59:45.5
27	Théo Druenne	Monaco	59:47.2
28	Nikola Simić	Serbia	1:01:07.0
29	Tomáš Peciar	Slovakia	1:03:48.5
