= Dávid Betlehem =

Hungarian swimmer (born 2003)

Personal information
- National team: Hungary
- Born: 4 September 2003 (age 23) Szombathely, Hungary

Sport
- Sport: Pool swimming, open water swimming
- Events: 400 m, 800 m, 1500 m, 5 km, 10 km, open water team relay
- College team: North Carolina State University
- Club: Balaton Úszó Klub
- Coached by: László Szokolai
Medal record
Representing Hungary
Event	1st	2nd	3rd
Olympic Games	0	0	1
World Championships	0	3	2
European Championships	4	4	3
Total	4	7	6
Men's open water swimming
Olympics
Bronze medal – third place	2024 Paris	10 km open water
World Championships
Silver medal – second place	2022 Budapest	Team relay
Silver medal – second place	2023 Fukuoka	Team relay
Silver medal – second place	2025 Singapore	3 km knockout sprints
Bronze medal – third place	2024 Doha	Team relay
Bronze medal – third place	2025 Singapore	Team open water
European Championships
Gold medal – first place	2024 Belgrade	5 km open water
Gold medal – first place	2024 Belgrade	Team relay
Gold medal – first place	2025 Stari Grad	Team relay
Gold medal – first place	2026 Paris	3 km knockout sprint
Silver medal – second place	2022 Rome	Team relay
Silver medal – second place	2025 Stari Grad	5 km open water
Silver medal – second place	2026 Paris	10 km open water
Silver medal – second place	2026 Paris	5 km open water
Bronze medal – third place	2020 Budapest	Team relay
Bronze medal – third place	2024 Belgrade	10 km open water
Bronze medal – third place	2025 Stari Grad	3 km open water
Bronze medal – third place	2026 Paris	Team open water
World Junior Open Water Championships
Gold medal – first place	2022 Seychelles	10 km open water
Gold medal – first place	2022 Seychelles	Team relay
Bronze medal – third place	2018 Eilat	5 km open water
European Junior Open Water Championships
Gold medal – first place	2019 Račice	5 km U16 team relay
Gold medal – first place	2021 Paris	5 km U19 team relay
Gold medal – first place	2022 Setúbal	5 km U19 team relay
Silver medal – second place	2019 Račice	7.5 km open water
Men's pool swimming
European Junior Championships
Silver medal – second place	2021 Rome	1500 m freestyle
European Youth Olympic Festival
Silver medal – second place	2019 Baku	1500 m freestyle

Dávid Betlehem (born 4 September 2003) is a Hungarian competitive pool and open water swimmer, who won a bronze medal representing Hungary at the 2024 Paris Olympics in the 10 km open water marathon.

At the 2022 World Aquatics Championships, he won a silver medal in the open water 4×1500 metre team relay. At the 2020 European Aquatics Championships, he won a bronze medal in the 5 kilometre open water team relay. At the 2022 World Junior Open Water Championships, he won gold medals in the 10 kilometre open water swim and team relay. He won the silver medal in the 1500 metre freestyle at the 2021 European Junior Swimming Championships.

== Background ==
Betlehem was born 4 September 2003 in Szombathely, Hungary, and has trained primarily with coach László Szokolai as part of the Balaton Úszó Klub swim club.

In the Fall of 2024, after his August 2024 bronze Olympic medal in Paris, he enrolled briefly at North Carolina State University where he was trained by Head Coach Braden Holloway. The university did not support his marathon training, as most of the team were training for standard swim distances, and Betlehem left the university in the late Fall of 2024. Though he was eventually banned from training at North Carolina, he was kind and considerate in his public statement about his experience at the university.

== Career ==
=== 2018 ===
At the 2018 FINA World Junior Open Water Swimming Championships, held in September in the Gulf of Eilat by Eilat, Israel, Betlehem won the bronze medal in the 5 kilometre open water swim with a time of 58 minutes and 56.5 seconds, finishing less than three seconds behind gold medalist Aleksandr Stepanov of Russia and one second behind silver medalist Ivan Morgun of Russia.

=== 2021 ===
Betlehem started his competition at the 2020 European Aquatics Championships, held in Budapest, Hungary, with the 5 kilometre open water swim on 12 May 2021, placing twelfth with a time of 56:00.4. Three days later, he won a bronze medal as part of the 5 kilometre open water team relay, contributing to a final time of 54 minutes and 18.5 seconds with relay teammates Réka Rohács, Anna Olasz, and Kristóf Rasovszky. For his third and final event, the 1500 metre freestyle held as part of pool swimming competition, he swam a time of 15:18.18 in the preliminaries on 18 May, placing twelfth overall.

Two months later, at the 2021 European Junior Swimming Championships, held at Stadio Olimpico del Nuoto in Rome, Italy, Betlehem won the bronze medal in the 1500 metre freestyle with a personal best time of 15:02.28. In November, he competed at the 2021 European Short Course Swimming Championships, conducted at the Palace of Water Sports in Kazan, Russia, placing seventh in the 800 metre freestyle, eleventh in the 1500 metre freestyle, and seventeenth in the 400 metre freestyle. The following month, as part of the first ever FINA 4×1500 metre mixed gender open water team relay event, contested at the Abu Dhabi Aquatics Festival in Abu Dhabi, United Arab Emirates for the last leg of the 2021 Marathon Swim World Series, he swam the third leg of the relay to help win the silver medal in a final time of 1:06:51.7.

=== 2022 ===
==== World open water season beginnings ====
In May 2022, on the first day of the first leg of the 2022 Marathon Swim World Series, held at Albarquel in Setúbal, Portugal, Betlehem placed seventh in the 10 kilometre swim with a time of 1:55:14.70. The next day, he won a bronze medal as part of the 4×1500 metre team relay event. At the 2022 World Aquatics Championships the following month, with open water swimming contested in the waters of Lupa Lake in Budapest, Hungary, he started off with a silver medal in the 4×1500 metre open water team relay, helping finish less than three seconds behind the gold medal team from Germany in 1:04:43.0. In the 5 kilometre open water swim the following day, 27 June, he placed seventh with a time of 54 minutes and 22.0 seconds. For his final event, on 29 June, Betlehem persisted to be the only male swimmer representing Hungary to cross the finish line in the 10 kilometre open water swim, after teammate Kristóf Rasovszky was kicked in the stomach and had to withdraw from competition halfway through the race for medical reasons, placing fifth in a time of 1 hour, 51 minutes and 29.8 seconds.

At the second leg of the 2022 Marathon Swim World Series, held in early July at Parc de la Villette in Paris, France, Betlehem initially placed third in the 10 kilometre swim with a time of 1 hour, 51 minutes and 41.95 seconds. However, FINA updated the medals and times for the event to change his placing from third to fourth after reviewing the results post-competition, instead allocating the medal to Nicholas Sloman of Australia.

==== 2022 Hungarian Open Water Championships ====
Later in the month, at the 2022 Hungarian National Open Water Championships, Betlehem was the fastest male competitor of all ages, junior and senior, with a time of 1:52:26.5, however due to his age, 18 years old, he was too young to be eligible for a senior title, thus he won the junior national title instead of the senior national title.

==== 2022 European Aquatics Championships ====
Betlehem was one of two Hungarian swimmers named to the official roster for Hungary in both pool swimming and open water swimming for the 2022 European Aquatics Championships, held in August in Rome, Italy. The first day of open water swimming competition at the Championships, 20 August, he placed seventh in the 5 kilometre open water swim, finishing in a time of 52:34.6, which was 21.1 seconds behind gold medalist Gregorio Paltrinieri of Italy. Originally, he was supposed to compete with the other swimmers in the event on 18 August, however extreme weather and waves resulted in all competitors competing two days after the intended date. In his first event on the final day, 21 August, he finished in a time of 1:51:09.8 in the 10 kilometre open water swim, placing ninth. Finishing off the Championships with the open water mixed team relay later in the day, he helped win the silver medal in a time of 59:53.9, swimming the third leg of the relay.

==== World open water season conclusion ====
Less than one week later, Betlehem won the bronze medal in the 10 kilometre open water swim at leg three of the 2022 Marathon Swim World Series, held at Lake Mégantic in Lac-Mégantic, Canada, finishing in a time of 1:50:52.00 and bringing his total ranking across the first three legs of the World Series up to third. In September, at the 2022 World Junior Open Water Swimming Championships in Seychelles, he won the gold medal in the 10 kilometre open water swim with a time of 1:53:10.30. The following day, he helped win the gold medal in the 4×1500 metre open water relay, anchoring the relay to a first-place finish and a final time of 1:11:20.10. Two months later, at the final leg of the World Series, in November in Eilat, Israel, he won the bronze medal in the 10 kilometre open water swim with a time of 1:46:44.20 and ranked as the third overall highest-scoring male competitor across the entire World Series circuit.

==== 2022 Hungarian Short Course Championships ====
At the 2022 Hungarian National Short Course Championships held in mid-November in Kaposvár, Betlehem won the gold medal and national title in the 1500 metre freestyle with a personal best time of 14:36.83, which was over two full seconds faster than the second-place finisher. In his other events, he won the silver medal in the 800 metre freestyle with a personal best time of 7:39.54, won the bronze medal in the 400 metre freestyle with a personal best time of 3:43.69, and placed sixth in the 200 metre freestyle with a personal best time of 1:46.97.

=== 2023 ===
At the 2023 LEN Open Water Cup stop held in March in Eilat, Israel, Betlehem won the gold medal in the 5 kilometre open water swim with a time of 51:38.0 that was over 15 seconds faster than the second-place finisher. On 19 April, at the 2023 Hungarian National Championships in Kaposvár, he won the silver medal in the 1500 metre freestyle with a personal best, 2023 World Aquatics Championships, and 2024 Olympic qualifying time of 14:59.65. The fourth and final day, he won the national title in the 800 metre freestyle with a personal best, 2023 World Championships, and 2024 Olympic qualifying time of 7:49.59, finishing 4.08 seconds ahead of silver medalist Kristóf Rasovszky. The following month, he won a bronze medal in the 10 kilometre open water swim at the leg of the 2023 FINA Open Water Tour in Setúbal, Portugal, finishing behind two Italians with a time of 1:53:12.10. He won a gold medal in the 4×1500 metre mixed open water relay the next day, helping finish in a time of 1:24:13.10.

== 2024 Paris Olympics ==
Dávid Betlehem won bronze at the August, 2024 Paris Olympic Games in the Men's 10 km open water marathon. After a difficult race, he made a strong move on his fifth 1.67 meter lap in Paris's Seine River, edging closer to his leading Hungarian teammate Kristóf Rasovszky who would finish for the gold. Betlehem remained among the leaders throughout the race, but generally trailed at the end of them. He held a consistent pace with 1.67 meter lap times of 11:40.7, 11:32.7, 11:41.7, 11:52.2, 11:40.0, and the last longer lap time of 12:09.7. Demonstrating his endurance, he accelerated in the last two laps. Betlehem outsprinted the fourth-place swimmer Domenico Acerenza of Italy, finishing only .6 seconds ahead of him, to capture the bronze with a time of 1:51:09.0. Betlehem trained in Hungary's Danube and also did pool training to prepare for his Olympic competition.

Betlehem also had a fourth-place finish in the 1500 meter event at the Paris Olympics, recording a time of 14.40 in the final.

== International championships ==
=== Open water and long course metres (50 m pool) ===
Meet	1500 m freestyle	5 km open water	10 km open water	open water team relay
Junior level
WJOWC 2018	—N/a	3rd place, bronze medalist(s)		
EJC 2021	2nd place, silver medalist(s)	—N/a	—N/a	—N/a
WJOWC 2022	—N/a		1st place, gold medalist(s)	1st place, gold medalist(s)
Senior level
EC 2020	12th	12th		3rd place, bronze medalist(s)
WC 2022		7th	5th	2nd place, silver medalist(s)
EC 2022		7th	9th	2nd place, silver medalist(s)
Olympics 2024	4th	—N/a	3rd place, bronze medalist(s)	—N/a

=== Short course metres (25 m pool) ===
Meet	400 m freestyle	800 m freestyle	1500 m freestyle
EC 2021	17th	7th	11th

== Personal best times ==
=== Long course metres (50 m pool) ===
Event	Time		Meet	Location	Date	Ref
100 m freestyle	51.68	r	2023 Hungarian National Championships	Kaposvár	21 April 2023	
200 m freestyle	1:49.60		2023 Hungarian National Championships	Kaposvár	21 April 2023	
400 m freestyle	3:48.33		2023 Hungarian National Championships	Kaposvár	20 April 2023	
800 m freestyle	7:49.59		2023 Hungarian National Championships	Kaposvár	22 April 2023	
1500 m freestyle	14:45.59	h, NR	2024 Olympic Games	Paris, France	3 August 2024	

Legend: h – preliminary heat; r – relay 1st leg

=== Short course metres (25 m pool) ===
Event	Time	Meet	Location	Date	Ref
200 m freestyle	1:46.97	2022 Hungarian National Short Course Championships	Kaposvár	18 November 2022	
400 m freestyle	3:43.69	2022 Hungarian National Short Course Championships	Kaposvár	16 November 2022	
800 m freestyle	7:39.54	2022 Hungarian National Short Course Championships	Kaposvár	19 November 2022	
1500 m freestyle	14:36.83	2022 Hungarian National Short Course Championships	Kaposvár	17 November 2022	

== Marathon Swim World Series circuits ==
Betlehem has won the following medals at Marathon Swim World Series circuits.

Edition	Individual			Relay			Total
Edition	Gold	Silver	Bronze	Gold	Silver	Bronze	Total
2021	0	0	0	0	1	0	1
2022	0	0	2	0	0	1	3
2023	0	0	1	1	0	0	2
Total	0	0	3	1	1	1	6
