= Open water swimming at the 2020 European Aquatics Championships – Men's 5 km =

Men's 5 km at the 2020 European Aquatics Championships
- Venue: Lupa Lake
- Dates: 12 May 2021
- Competitors: 25 from 13 nations
- Winning time: 55:43.3

Medalists
gold medal	Gregorio Paltrinieri	Italy
silver medal	Marc-Antoine Olivier	France
bronze medal	Dario Verani	Italy

The Men's 5 km competition of the 2020 European Aquatics Championships was held on 12 May 2021.

== Results ==
The race was started at 14:45.

Rank	Swimmer	Nationality	Time
1st place, gold medalist(s)	Gregorio Paltrinieri	Italy	55:43.3
2nd place, silver medalist(s)	Marc-Antoine Olivier	France	55:45.1
3rd place, bronze medalist(s)	Dario Verani	Italy	55:46.6
4	Kristóf Rasovszky	Hungary	55:47.3
5	Logan Fontaine	France	55:47.5
6	Marcello Guidi	Italy	55:47.7
7	Jules Wallart	France	55:49.5
8	Kirill Abrosimov	Russia	55:50.2
9	Florian Wellbrock	Germany	55:50.5
10	Ruwen Straub	Germany	55:51.3
11	Rob Muffels	Germany	55:57.5
12	Dávid Betlehem	Hungary	56:00.4
13	Guillem Pujol	Spain	56:55.5
14	Kirill Belyaev	Russia	56:56.3
15	Denis Adeev	Russia	56:56.9
16	Christian Schreiber	Switzerland	56:57.4
17	Daniel Székelyi	Hungary	57:01.0
18	Tamás Farkas	Serbia	57:02.2
19	Logan Vanhuys	Belgium	57:02.6
20	Vít Ingeduld	Czech Republic	57:03.0
21	Jan Hercog	Austria	57:03.6
22	Martin Straka	Czech Republic	58:36.8
23	Tomáš Peciar	Slovakia	1:02:05.5
24	Sander Paavo	Estonia	1:05:34.8
	Matěj Kozubek	Czech Republic	DNF
