= Open water swimming at the 2026 European Aquatics Championships – Men's 5 km =

Men's 5 km at the 2026 European Aquatics Championships
- Venue: River Seine
- Dates: 5 August
- Competitors: 34 from 18 nations
- Winning time: 55:40.25

Medalists
gold medal	Florian Wellbrock	Germany
silver medal	Dávid Betlehem	Hungary
bronze medal	Gregorio Paltrinieri	Italy

The Men's 5 km competition at the 2026 European Aquatics Championships was held on 5 August 2026.

== Results ==
The race was started at 10:00.

Rank	Swimmer	Nationality	Time
1st place, gold medalist(s)	Florian Wellbrock	Germany	55:40.25
2nd place, silver medalist(s)	Dávid Betlehem	Hungary	55:42.62
3rd place, bronze medalist(s)	Gregorio Paltrinieri	Italy	55:44.76
4	Sacha Velly	France	55:51.50
5	Domenico Acerenza	Italy	55:54.46
6	Marcello Guidi	Italy	55:54.92
7	Kristóf Rasovszky	Hungary	55:55.81
8	Athanasios Kynigakis	Greece	56:02.50
9	Luca Karl	Austria	56:28.64
10	Oliver Klemet	Germany	56:34.00
11	Mario Méndez	Spain	57:07.27
12	Jesper Lietzen	Finland	57:07.60
13	Paul Niederberger	Switzerland	57:09.51
14	Diogo Cardoso	Portugal	57:09.82
15	Vladimir Muratov	Neutral Athletes B	57:10.56
16	Denis Borovka	Czechia	57:11.57
17	Bartosz Kapała	Poland	57:11.59
18	Martin Straka	Czechia	57:11.73
19	Vladimir Ivanov	Neutral Athletes B	57:13.40
20	Aleksandr Stepanov	Neutral Athletes B	57:15.96
21	Hunor Kovács-Seres	Hungary	57:16.04
22	Logan Fontaine	France	57:16.56
23	Mateo García	Spain	57:27.19
24	Christian Schreiber	Switzerland	59:24.87
25	Francisco Amaral	Portugal	59:26.66
26	Emir Batur Albayrak	Turkey	1:00:25.35
27	Yonatan Ahdut	Israel	1:00:25.39
28	Muhammed Yavuz Selim Oğuz	Turkey	1:00:29.01
29	Petar Cekov	North Macedonia	1:01:27.36
30	Esteban Faure	Monaco	1:01:34.33
31	Nolan Carrel	Switzerland	1:02:16.36
32	Doğukan Ulaç	Turkey	1:02:55.87
33	Tomáš Peciar	Slovakia	1:04:19.88
	Marc-Antoine Olivier	France	Did not finish
	Théo Druenne	Monaco	Did not start
