= Open water swimming at the 2025 World Aquatics Championships – Mixed 4 × 1500 metre relay =

Mixed 4 × 1500 metre open water relay at the 2025 World Aquatics Championships
- Venue: Palawan Beach, Sentosa Island
- Location: Singapore
- Dates: 20 July
- Competitors: 92 from 23 nations
- Teams: 23
- Winning time: 1:09:13.3

Medalists
gold medal	Celine Rieder; Oliver Klemet; Isabel Marie Gose; Florian Wellbrock	Germany
silver medal	Barbara Pozzobon; Ginevra Taddeucci; Marcello Guidi; Gregorio Paltrinieri	Italy
bronze medal	Bettina Fábián; Viktória Mihályvári-Farkas; Kristóf Rasovszky; Dávid Betlehem	Hungary

The mixed 4 × 1500 metre relay event at the 2025 World Aquatics Championships was held on 20 July 2025.

The first leg was led by the teams who sent in a male swimmer first, while top teams Germany, Italy, Hungary, France and Australia all had a female swimmer. Though the middle two legs of the race, these teams caught up, and going into the fourth and final leg, Florian Wellbrock took over for Germany in first, nine seconds ahead of Gregorio Paltrinieri who took over for Italy in second. Paltrinieri quickly closed the nine-second gap on Wellbrock. Over the final straight, Wellbrock sped up and blocked Paltrinieri to win gold for Germany with a time of 1:09:13.3. Paltrinieri finished second for Italy with 1:09:15.4, and then Hungary finished third with 1:09:16.7.

Germany's victory won Wellbrock his fourth gold medal of the Championships, meaning he had won every gold available in the open water events. It was the first time this had ever been achieved.

== Background ==
Germany's team composed of Florian Wellbrock, the winner of the men's 5 km and 10 km earlier in the week, Isabel Gose, Oliver Klemet, and Celine Rieder. The Australian team included Moesha Johnson, who won the women's 5 km and 10 km, and the Italian team contained both Gregorio Paltrinieri, the silver medallist in the men's 5 km and 10 km, and Ginevra Taddeucci, the silver medallist in the women's 5 km and 10 km. It was the final open water swimming event at this iteration of the championships.

== Qualification ==
Each federation could enter one team consisting of two athletes of each gender.

== Race ==
The race took place around a course off the coast of Palawan Beach, Sentosa. It was held on 20 July at 08:00 SGT.

Germany, Italy, Hungary, France and Australia all allocated female swimmers to the first leg of the relay, which meant those top teams were nearer the back of the race. Thailand's Ratthawit Thammananthachote led from the start of the race and finished the leg in first, while Germany's Celine Rieder was the first woman to reach the changeover.

Over the second leg, Italy and Hungary both employed a second female swimmer, while Germany and France sent in Oliver Klemet and Marc-Antoine Olivier, respectively. Klemet and Olivier took the lead, and going into the second changeover, France was first, Germany was second, and Australia came third.

Going into the third leg, Inès Delacroix took over for France, Isabel Gose took over for Germany, and Moesha Johnson took over for Australia around 37 seconds behind. Over the third leg, Gose took the lead for Germany, and she had built a nine-second lead over Delacroix by the changeover. France retained second place, and Italy came in third, about one second behind.

Florian Wellbrock took over for Germany while Gregorio Paltrinieri took over for Italy. Paltrinieri quickly closed the nine-second gap on Wellbrock, while France's Logan Fontaine, Hungary's Dávid Betlehem, and Australia's Kyle Lee followed. Over the final straight, Wellbrock sped up and blocked Paltrinieri to win gold for Germany with a time of 1:09:13.3. Paltrinieri finished second for Italy with 1:09:15.4, and then Betlehem closed for Hungary with 1:09:16.7. France finished fourth with 1:09:24.7. After the race, Wellbrock needed medical attention due to the heat of the water.

Germany's victory earned Wellbrock his fourth gold medal of the Championships, meaning he had won every gold available in the open water events (the 10 km, 5 km, 3 km knockout sprint, and this relay). It was the first time this had ever been achieved at the World Aquatics Championships. After the race, Wellbrock said "I'm still speechless. I have no idea how I did it." On the women's side, Ginevra Taddeucci won silver in the same four events.

The win also gave Wellbrock his fourteenth world championship medal and tenth gold medal, and Paltrinieri's silver was his nineteenth world championship medal.

Results
Rank	Nation	Swimmers (Note: Ordered by the order they swam in)	Time
1st place, gold medalist(s)	Germany	Celine Rieder; Oliver Klemet; Isabel Marie Gose; Florian Wellbrock	1:09:13.3
2nd place, silver medalist(s)	Italy	Barbara Pozzobon; Ginevra Taddeucci; Marcello Guidi; Gregorio Paltrinieri	1:09:15.4
3rd place, bronze medalist(s)	Hungary	Bettina Fábián; Viktória Mihályvári-Farkas; Kristóf Rasovszky; Dávid Betlehem	1:09:16.7
4	France	Clémence Coccordano; Marc-Antoine Olivier; Inès Delacroix; Logan Fontaine	1:09:24.7
5	Australia	Chelsea Gubecka; Nicholas Sloman; Moesha Johnson; Kyle Lee	1:09:59.3
6	Neutral Athletes B	Margarita Ershova; Kseniia Misharina; Savelii Luzin; Denis Adeev	1:10:24.0
7	Brazil	Ana Marcela Cunha; Viviane Jungblut; Matheus Melecchi; Luiz Loureiro	1:10:27.2
8	United States	Mariah Denigan; Brooke Travis; Charlie Clark; Joey Tepper	1:12:01.6
9	China	Tian Muran; Zhang Jinhou; Wang Kexin; Lan Tianchen	1:13:33.2
10	Chinese Taipei	Tsao Jun-yan; Lin Jia-shien; Teng Yu-wen; Cho Cheng-chi	1:14:57.0
11	Kazakhstan	Mariya Fedotova; Darya Pushko; Galymzhan Balabek; Lev Cherepanov	1:15:00.2
12	South Africa	Matthew Caldwell; Amica de Jager; Kellen Jones; Catherine Van Rensburg	1:15:25.2
13	Ecuador	Danna Martínez; Esteban Enderica; Ana Abad; David Farinango	1:15:30.6
14	Singapore	Chantal Liew; Artyom Lukasevits; Kate Ona; Russel Pang	1:15:39.0
15	Turkey	Atakan Ercan; Su İnal; Selinnur Sade; Emre Sarp Zeytinoğlu	1:15:42.8
16	Mexico	Diego Obele; Sharon Guerrero; Alan González; Paulina Alanís	1:15:54.3
17	South Korea	Oh Se-beom; Park Jae-hun; Kim Sue-ah; Hwang Ji-yeon	1:16:01.0
18	Thailand	Ratthawit Thammananthachote; Kamonchanok Kwanmuang; Chonpasanop Chatwuti; Nithikorn Jeampiriyakul	1:16:37.3
19	Hong Kong	Keith Sin; Nip Tsz Yin; Nikita Lam; Chan Tsun Hin	1:18:48.6
20	India	Prashans Manjunath Hiremagalur; Diksha Sandip Yadav; Meenakshi Gopakumar Menon; Army Pal	1:20:59.8
21	Namibia	Nico Esslinger; Reza Westerduin; Madison Bergh; Tristan Nell	1:22:07.5
22	Mongolia	Ganzorigtyn Sugar; Gongoryn Maidar; Amgalangiin Altannar; Temüüjingiin Anungoo	1:31:48.7
23	Kenya	Samir Bachelani; Aryan Joseph; Sera Mawira; Maria Bianchi	1:37:42.7

== Further information ==
- Ross, Andy (20 July 2025). "Germany Caps Open Water Swimming in Singapore with Gold in Mixed 4 × 1500m relay". World Aquatics. – Quotes from Wellbrock, Betlehem and Paltrinieri after the race.
- "Mixed 4 × 1500m Relay Final of Open Water at World Aquatics Championships 2025". english.news.cn. Xinhuanet. 20 July 2025. – Photo gallery from the event
