= Open water swimming at the 2022 European Aquatics Championships – Men's 10 km =

Men's 10 km at the 2022 European Aquatics Championships
- Venue: Ostia
- Dates: 21 August
- Competitors: 25 from 13 nations
- Winning time: 1:50:33.6

Medalists
gold medal	Domenico Acerenza	Italy
silver medal	Marc-Antoine Olivier	France
bronze medal	Logan Fontaine	France

The Men's 10 km competition of the 2022 European Aquatics Championships will be held on 21 August.

== Results ==
The race was started at 10:00.

Rank	Swimmer	Nationality	Time
1st place, gold medalist(s)	Domenico Acerenza	Italy	1:50:33.6
2nd place, silver medalist(s)	Marc-Antoine Olivier	France	1:50:37.3
3rd place, bronze medalist(s)	Logan Fontaine	France	1:50:39.1
4	Matan Roditi	Israel	1:50:56.6
5	Oliver Klemet	Germany	1:51:04.8
6	Kristóf Rasovszky	Hungary	1:51:04.9
7	Gregorio Paltrinieri	Italy	1:51:12.7
8	Athanasios Kynigakis	Greece	1:51:14.3
9	Dávid Betlehem	Hungary	1:52:09.8
10	Guillem Pujol Belmonte	Spain	1:54:01.6
11	Martin Straka	Czech Republic	1:54:42.2
12	Jan Hercog	Austria	1:55:37.5
13	Andrea Manzi	Italy	1:56:31.7
14	Logan Vanhuys	Belgium	1:56:48.3
15	Diogo Cardoso	Portugal	1:56:56.5
16	Ben Langner	Germany	1:58:37.4
17	Nathan Hughes	Great Britain	2:00:40.3
18	Christian Schreiber	Switzerland	2:00:40.6
19	Ondřej Zach	Czech Republic	2:00:44.2
20	Michail Diasitis	Greece	2:02:24.2
21	Péter Gálicz	Hungary	2:10:14.7
	Tiago Campos	Portugal	DNF
	Tomáš Chocholatý	Czech Republic	DNF
	Hector Pardoe	Great Britain	DNF
	Toby Robinson	Great Britain	DNF
	Lars Bottelier	Netherlands	DNS
	Théo Druenne	Monaco	DNS
	Grgo Mujan	Croatia	DNS
	Tomáš Peciar	Slovakia	DNS
	Marcel Schouten	Netherlands	DNS
