= FINA Marathon Swim World Series =

Open water swimming race

The FINA Marathon Swim World Series, known as the 10 km Marathon Swimming World Cup until 2017, is a series of 10-kilometer, open water swimming races held annually since 2007. Prior to 2007, 10K races were held as part of the FINA's Open Water Grand Prix series; post split, this latter series is now for races over 10 kilometers in length. Prizes and points are awarded for each race in the series, with the points being added together for an overall point standing (and overall awards).

Names for individual editions of the World Series have varied over time, with titles including Marathon Swimming World Cup, Marathon Swim World Series, Open Water Tour, and Open Water Swimming World Cup.

In October 2010, the eighth and final race of the series in Fujairah, UAE made news following the death of the USA's Fran Crippen during the race. In December 2021, at the final leg of the year's World Series, a 4×1500 metre mixed relay event was debuted as part of the Abu Dhabi Aquatics Festival.

== Overall winners ==
Edition	Year	Men's champion	Women's champion
1	2007	Vladimir Dyatchin (RUS)	Angela Maurer (GER)
2	2008	Valerio Cleri (ITA)	Angela Maurer (GER)
3	2009	Thomas Lurz (GER)	Poliana Okimoto (BRA)
4	2010	Chad Ho (RSA)	Ana Marcela Cunha (BRA)
5	2011	Thomas Lurz (GER)	Angela Maurer (GER)
6	2012	Spyridon Gianniotis (GRE)	Ana Marcela Cunha (BRA)
7	2013	Thomas Lurz (GER)	Emily Brunemann (USA)
8	2014	Allan do Carmo (BRA)	Ana Marcela Cunha (BRA)
9	2015	Christian Reichert (GER)	Rachele Bruni (ITA)
10	2016	Simone Ruffini (ITA)	Rachele Bruni (ITA)
11	2017	Simone Ruffini (ITA)	Arianna Bridi (ITA)
12	2018	Ferry Weertman (NED)	Ana Marcela Cunha (BRA)
13	2019	Kristóf Rasovszky (HUN)	Rachele Bruni (ITA)
14	2020	Cancelled after one event due to the COVID-19 pandemic.	
15	2021	Kristóf Rasovszky (HUN)	Océane Cassignol (FRA); Ana Marcela Cunha (BRA)
16	2022	Kristóf Rasovszky (HUN); Gregorio Paltrinieri (ITA)	Ana Marcela Cunha (BRA)
17	2023	Kristóf Rasovszky (HUN)	Leonie Beck (GER)
18	2024	Marc-Antoine Olivier (FRA)	Ana Marcela Cunha (BRA)
19	2025	Logan Fontaine (FRA)	Ginevra Taddeucci (ITA)
20	2026	Dávid Betlehem (HUN)	Moesha Johnson (AUS)

== See also ==
- FINA World Open Water Swimming Championships
- Open Water Swimmers of the Year
