= 2021 FINA Marathon Swim World Series =

International swimming competition

FINA Marathon Swim World Series
- Dates: March 13 – December 16

The 2021 FINA Marathon Swim World Series began on 13 March with the first stage in Doha, Qatar and ended at the last stage on 16 December 2021 in Abu Dhabi, United Arab Emirates. It was the 15th edition of the FINA-sanctioned series, and included nine events.

A 4×1500 metre mixed relay event was debuted as part of the Abu Dhabi Aquatics Festival at the final leg of the World Series.

== Point system and prize money ==
Rank	Points
1st	800
2nd	700
3rd	600
4th	550
5th	500
6th	450
7th	400
8th	350
9th	300
10th	250

=== Leg Prize Money ===
Rank	US$
1st	3,500
2nd	3,000
3rd	2,500
4th	1,700
5th	1,500
6th	1,200
7th	950
8th	650

== Calendar ==
The calendar for the 2021 series, announced by FINA.

Date	Location
March 13	(Qatar) Doha Corniche, Doha
~~May 9~~	~~Beau Vallon Beach, Seychelles~~
~~June 12~~	(Hungary) ~~Lupa Lake, Budakalász~~
~~June 19~~	(Portugal) ~~Albarquel Beach, Setúbal~~
~~July 25~~	(Canada) ~~Lac Saint-Jean, Quebec~~
~~August 7~~	(Canada) ~~Lac Mégantic, Quebec~~
August 28	(North Macedonia) Lake Ohrid, Ohrid
December 12	(Israel) Red Sea, Eilat
December 15–16	(United Arab Emirates) Yas Island, Abu Dhabi

== Medal summary ==
=== Men ===
Event	Gold	Silver	Bronze
Doha	Marc-Antoine Olivier (FRA)	Kristóf Rasovszky (HUN)	Gregorio Paltrinieri (ITA)
Lake Ohrid	Marc-Antoine Olivier (FRA)	Niklas Frach (GER)	Kirill Abrosimov (RUS)
Eilat	Kristóf Rasovszky (HUN)	Marc-Antoine Olivier (FRA)	Niklas Frach (GER)
Abu Dhabi	Florian Wellbrock (GER)	Domenico Acerenza (ITA)	Kristóf Rasovszky (HUN)

=== Women ===
Event	Gold	Silver	Bronze
Doha	Ana Marcela Cunha (BRA)	Océane Cassignol (FRA)	Lea Boy (GER)
Lake Ohrid	Anna Olasz (HUN)	Giulia Gabbrielleschi (ITA)	Caroline Jouisse (FRA)
Eilat	Ana Marcela Cunha (BRA)	Océane Cassignol (FRA)	Giulia Gabbrielleschi (ITA)
Abu Dhabi	Leonie Beck (GER)	Ana Marcela Cunha (BRA)	Sharon van Rouwendaal (NED)

=== Medal table ===
Rank	Nation	Gold	Silver	Bronze	Total
1	France (FRA)	2	3	1	6
2	Germany (GER)	2	1	2	5
3	Hungary (HUN)	2	1	1	4
4	Brazil (BRA)	2	1	0	3
5	Italy (ITA)	0	2	2	4
6	Netherlands (NED)	0	0	1	1
6	Russia (RUS)	0	0	1	1
Totals (7 entries)		8	8	8	24
