= Open water swimming at the 2022 European Aquatics Championships – Men's 5 km =

Men's 5 km at the 2022 European Aquatics Championships
- Venue: Ostia
- Dates: 20 August
- Competitors: 21 from 13 nations
- Winning time: 52:13.5

Medalists
gold medal	Gregorio Paltrinieri	Italy
silver medal	Domenico Acerenza	Italy
bronze medal	Marc-Antoine Olivier	France

The Men's 5 km competition of the 2022 European Aquatics Championships will be held on 20 August.

Competition was delayed from 18 to 20 August due to extreme weather affecting water conditions.

== Results ==
The race was started at 10:00.

Rank	Swimmer	Nationality	Time
1st place, gold medalist(s)	Gregorio Paltrinieri	Italy	52:13.5
2nd place, silver medalist(s)	Domenico Acerenza	Italy	52:14.2
3rd place, bronze medalist(s)	Marc-Antoine Olivier	France	52:20.8
4	Logan Fontaine	France	52:21.3
5	Oliver Klemet	Germany	52:33.7
6	Kristóf Rasovszky	Hungary	52:34.0
7	Dávid Betlehem	Hungary	52:34.6
8	Marcello Guidi	Italy	52:44.0
9	Carlos Garach	Spain	53:34.8
10	Tamaš Farkaš	Serbia	53:37.1
11	Linus Schwedler	Germany	54:17.2
12	Diogo Cardoso	Portugal	54:38.2
13	Guillem Pujol Belmonte	Spain	55:07.7
14	Ondřej Zach	Czech Republic	55:08.8
15	Ziv Cohen	Israel	56:35.1
16	Tomáš Chocholatý	Czech Republic	56:37.9
17	Joseph Deighan	Great Britain	56:40.9
18	Konstantinos Zachariadis	Greece	56:44.1
19	Théo Druenne	Monaco	56:44.2
	Tomáš Peciar	Slovakia	DSQ
	Yonatan Ahdut	Israel	DSQ
	Grgo Mujan	Croatia	DNS
