= Open water swimming at the 2024 European Aquatics Championships – Men's 10 km =

Men's 10 km at the 2024 European Aquatics Championships
- Venue: Ada Ciganlija
- Dates: 12 June
- Competitors: 29 from 15 nations
- Winning time: 1:49:19.6

Medalists
gold medal	Gregorio Paltrinieri	Italy
silver medal	Marc-Antoine Olivier	France
bronze medal	Dávid Betlehem	Hungary

The Men's 10 km competition at the 2024 European Aquatics Championships was held on 12 June.

== Results ==
The race was started at 12:00.

Rank	Swimmer	Nationality	Time
1st place, gold medalist(s)	Gregorio Paltrinieri	Italy	1:49:19.6
2nd place, silver medalist(s)	Marc-Antoine Olivier	France	1:49:41.0
3rd place, bronze medalist(s)	Dávid Betlehem	Hungary	1:49:41.2
4	Domenico Acerenza	Italy	1:49:41.2
5	Dario Verani	Italy	1:49:41.5
6	Hector Pardoe	Great Britain	1:49:45.3
7	Athanasios Kynigakis	Greece	1:49:46.2
8	Niklas Frach	Germany	1:49:48.7
9	Kristóf Rasovszky	Hungary	1:49:53.8
10	Sacha Velly	France	1:49:57.3
11	Jonas Kusche	Germany	1:50:16.8
12	Jan Hercog	Austria	1:50:25.7
13	Matan Roditi	Israel	1:50:46.4
14	Tobias Robinson	Great Britain	1:52:27.4
15	Logan Vanhuys	Belgium	1:53:11.8
16	Guillem Pujol	Spain	1:53:12.7
17	Piotr Woźniak	Poland	1:53:22.3
18	Noah Lerch	Germany	1:53:55.1
19	Diogo Cardoso	Portugal	1:53:58.6
20	Adam Mróz	Poland	1:53:59.0
21	Jean-Baptiste Clusman	France	1:54:17.9
22	Alejandro Puebla	Spain	1:57:12.6
23	Christian Schreiber	Switzerland	1:57:31.0
24	Martin Straka	Czech Republic	1:57:57.6
25	Ioannis Skaris	Greece	1:58:25.2
26	Matěj Kozubek	Czech Republic	1:58:33.6
27	Yonatan Ahdut	Israel	2:01:14.0
28	Ziv Cohen	Israel	2:03:54.2
29	Richard Urban	Slovakia	2:12:39.1
