= 2020 FINA Marathon Swim World Series =

International swimming competition

The 2020 FINA Marathon Swim World Series was scheduled to consist of 10 stops between 15 February to 24 October 2020. Due to the COVID-19 pandemic, only the first stop in Doha took place, and on 20 July, FINA confirmed that the remainder of the 2020 series had been cancelled.

== Calendar ==
The calendar for the 2020 series was announced by FINA on 10 December 2019.

The Seychelles leg was scheduled to take place on 3 May, but was initially postponed until 18 August due to the COVID-19 pandemic.

On 20 July, it was confirmed that the remainder of the 2020 series had been cancelled.

Date	Location
February 15	(Qatar) Doha
~~June 6~~	~~(Hungary) Lupa Lake~~
~~June 13~~	~~(Portugal) Setúbal~~
~~July 19~~	~~(Canada) Lac Saint-Jean, Quebec~~
~~August 1~~	~~(Canada) Lac Mégantic, Quebec~~
~~August 18~~	~~Beau Vallon Beach, Seychelles~~
~~August 30~~	~~(North Macedonia) Ohrid~~
~~September 19~~	~~(Chinese Taipei) Nantou~~
~~October 15~~	~~(China) Chun'an~~
~~October 24~~	~~Hong Kong~~

== Medal summary ==
=== Men ===
Event	Gold	Silver	Bronze
Doha	Marc-Antoine Olivier (FRA)	Rob Muffels (GER)	Florian Wellbrock (GER)

=== Women ===
Event	Gold	Silver	Bronze
Doha	Leonie Beck (GER)	Ana Marcela Cunha (BRA)	Sharon van Rouwendaal (NED)

=== Medal table ===
Rank	Nation	Gold	Silver	Bronze	Total
1	Germany (GER)	1	1	1	3
2	France (FRA)	1	0	0	1
3	Brazil (BRA)	0	1	0	1
4	Netherlands (NED)	0	0	1	1
Totals (4 entries)		2	2	2	6
