= Open water swimming at the 2020 European Aquatics Championships – Team =

Team at the 2020 European Aquatics Championships
- Venue: Lupa Lake
- Dates: 15 May 2021
- Competitors: 24 from 6 nations
- Teams: 6
- Winning time: 54:09.0

Medalists
| gold medal | Rachele Bruni; Giulia Gabbrielleschi; Gregorio Paltrinieri; Domenico Acerenza | Italy |
| silver medal | Lea Boy; Leonie Beck; Rob Muffels; Florian Wellbrock | Germany |
| bronze medal | Réka Rohács; Anna Olasz; Dávid Betlehem; Kristóf Rasovszky | Hungary |

The Mixed 5 km Team Relay competition of the 2020 European Aquatics Championships was held on 15 May 2021.

== Results ==
The race was started at 14:30.

| Rank | Nation | Time |
|---|---|---|
| 1st place, gold medalist(s) | Italy; Rachele Bruni; Giulia Gabbrielleschi; Gregorio Paltrinieri; Domenico Acerenza | 54:09.0 |
| 2nd place, silver medalist(s) | Germany; Lea Boy; Leonie Beck; Rob Muffels; Florian Wellbrock | 54:18.0 |
| 3rd place, bronze medalist(s) | Hungary; Réka Rohács; Anna Olasz; Dávid Betlehem; Kristóf Rasovszky | 54:18.5 |
| 4 | France; Océane Cassignol; Lara Grangeon; Logan Fontaine; Marc-Antoine Olivier | 54:18.7 |
| 5 | Russia; Anastasiya Kirpichnikova; Denis Adeev; Ekaterina Sorokina; Kirill Abrosimov | 56:03.2 |
| 6 | Czech Republic; Martin Straka; Alena Benešová; Vít Ingeduld; Julie Pleskotová | 57:42.4 |
