= Open water swimming at the 2024 European Aquatics Championships – Team =

Team at the 2024 European Aquatics Championships
- Venue: Ada Ciganlija
- Dates: 15 June
- Competitors: 28 from 7 nations
- Teams: 7
- Winning time: 1:06:07.7

Medalists
gold medal	Mira Szimcsák; Bettina Fábián; Dávid Betlehem; Kristóf Rasovszky	Hungary
silver medal	Giulia Gabbrielleschi; Ginevra Taddeucci; Andrea Filadelli; Marcello Guidi	Italy
bronze medal	Caroline Jouisse; Océane Cassignol; Sacha Velly; Marc-Antoine Olivier	France

The mixed team competition at the 2024 European Aquatics Championships was held on 15 June.

== Results ==
The race was started at 09:00.

Rank	Nation	Swimmers	Time
1st place, gold medalist(s)	Hungary	Mira Szimcsák; Bettina Fábián; Dávid Betlehem; Kristóf Rasovszky	1:06:07.7
2nd place, silver medalist(s)	Italy	Giulia Gabbrielleschi; Ginevra Taddeucci; Andrea Filadelli; Marcello Guidi	1:06:28.6
3rd place, bronze medalist(s)	France	Caroline Jouisse; Océane Cassignol; Sacha Velly; Marc-Antoine Olivier	1:06:51.7
4	Germany	Jeannette Spiwoks; Celine Rieder; Jonas Kusche; Niklas Frach	1:07:36.2
5	Spain	María de Valdés; Ángela Martínez; Guillem Pujol; Alejandro Puebla	1:07:38.1
6	Israel	Eva Fabian; Matan Roditi; Yonatan Ahdut; Ofek Adir	1:09:40.5
7	Slovakia	Hana Krasnohorská; Richard Urban; Tomáš Peciar; Natália Špániková	1:15:51.3
