= Open water swimming at the 2026 European Aquatics Championships – Mixed 4 × 1500 metre relay =

Mixed 4 × 1500 metre relay at the 2024 European Aquatics Championships
- Venue: River Seine
- Dates: 8 August
- Competitors: 32 from 8 nations
- Teams: 8
- Winning time: 1:03:39.28

Medalists
gold medal	Julia Ackermann; Isabel Gose; Oliver Klemet; Florian Wellbrock	Germany
silver medal	Barbara Pozzobon; Ginevra Taddeucci; Marcello Guidi; Gregorio Paltrinieri	Italy
bronze medal	Bettina Fábián; Viktória Mihályvári-Farkas; Dávid Betlehem; Kristóf Rasovszky	Hungary

The Mixed 4 × 1500 metre relay competition at the 2026 European Aquatics Championships was held on 8 August.

== Results ==
The race was started at 10:00.

Rank	Nation	Time
1st place, gold medalist(s)	Germany; Julia Ackermann; Isabel Gose; Oliver Klemet; Florian Wellbrock	1:03:39.28
2nd place, silver medalist(s)	Italy; Barbara Pozzobon; Ginevra Taddeucci; Marcello Guidi; Gregorio Paltrinieri	1:03:41.34
3rd place, bronze medalist(s)	Hungary; Bettina Fábián; Viktória Mihályvári-Farkas; Dávid Betlehem; Kristóf Rasovszky	1:03:42.44
4	France; Lou-Ann Gaudaire; Inès Delacroix; Marc-Antoine Olivier; Sacha Velly	1:05:39.49
5	Neutral Athletes B Ekaterina Sorokina; Anastasiia Saratova; Vladimir Ivanov; Vladimir Muratov	1:07:21.46
6	Turkey; Emir Batur Albayrak; Su İnal; Muhammed Yavuz Selim Oğuz; Tuna Erdoğan	1:09:53.88
7	Slovakia; Lucia Slámová; Hana Krasnohorská; Jakub Gabriel; Tomáš Peciar	1:13:00.39
	Czech Republic; Julie Pleskotová; Alena Benešová; Denis Borovka; Martin Straka	Disqualified
