= FINA 10 km Marathon Swimming World Cup 2009 =

International swimming competition

The FINA 10 km Marathon Swimming World Cup 2009 occurred in 2009, and was the third edition of the 10K-only circuit. The 2009 edition included 13 races. Races are held in open water: generally lakes, rivers or the sea; with prize money and points towards the overall world cup title made available at each location.

== Venues and dates ==
Date	City	County
Jan 24	Santos	Brazil
Jun 29	Setúbal	Portugal
Jul 23	Lac St-Jean, Roberval	Canada
Aug 8	Varna	Bulgaria
Aug 12	Lake Annecy, Annecy	France
Aug 15	London	Great Britain
Aug 29	Copenhagen	Denmark
Sep 7	Manhattan Island, New York City	United States
Sep 12	Cancún	Mexico
Sep 26	Xin Jinhe, Shantou, Guangong	China
Oct 4	Repulse Bay, Hong Kong	China
Oct 17	Dubai	United Arab Emirates
Oct 21	Sharjah	United Arab Emirates

== See also ==
- Round Christiansborg Open Water Swim
