= Open water swimming at the 2022 European Aquatics Championships – Team =

Team at the 2022 European Aquatics Championships
- Venue: Ostia
- Dates: 21 August
- Competitors: 20 from 5 nations
- Winning time: 59:43.1

Medalists
gold medal	Rachele Bruni; Ginevra Taddeucci; Gregorio Paltrinieri; Domenico Acerenza	Italy
silver medal	Réka Rohács; Anna Olasz; Dávid Betlehem; Kristóf Rasovszky	Hungary
bronze medal	Madelon Catteau; Aurélie Muller; Axel Reymond; Logan Fontaine	France

The mixed team competition of the 2022 European Aquatics Championships was held on 21 August.

== Results ==
The race was started at 16:00.

Rank	Nation	Swimmers	Time
1st place, gold medalist(s)	Italy	Rachele Bruni; Ginevra Taddeucci; Gregorio Paltrinieri; Domenico Acerenza	59:43.1
2nd place, silver medalist(s)	Hungary	Réka Rohács; Anna Olasz; Dávid Betlehem; Kristóf Rasovszky	59:53.9
3rd place, bronze medalist(s)	France	Madelon Catteau; Aurélie Muller; Axel Reymond; Logan Fontaine	1:00:08.3
4	Spain	María de Valdés; Ángela Martínez; Carlos Garach; Guillem Pujol Belmont	1:00:24.6
5	Germany	Lea Boy; Leonie Beck; Linus Schwedler; Oliver Klemet	1:00:43.8
