= Gregorio Paltrinieri =

Italian swimmer (born 1994)

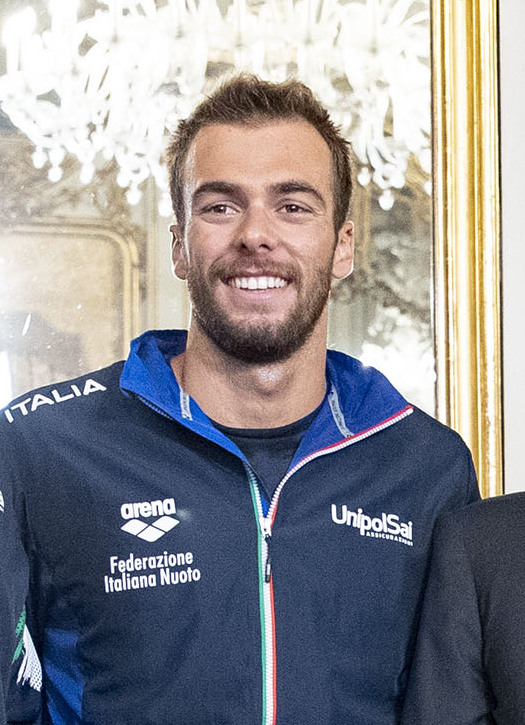
- Paltrinieri in 2019

Personal information
- Nicknames: Greg, SuperGreg
- National team: Italy
- Born: 5 September 1994 (age 32) Carpi, Italy
- Height: 1.91 m (6 ft 3 in)
- Weight: 72 kg (159 lb)

Sport
- Sport: Swimming
- Strokes: Freestyle
- Club: Fiamme Oro; Coopernuoto
- Coach: Fabrizio Antonelli
Medal record
Men's swimming
Representing Italy
Event	1st	2nd	3rd
Olympic Games	1	2	2
World Aquatics Championships	6	8	5
World Championships (SC)	3	3	0
European Championships (LC)	6	5	1
European Open Water C'ships	7	1	0
European Championships (SC)	4	2	0
Mediterranean Games	2	0	0
Summer Universiade	3	0	0
Total	32	21	8
Olympic Games
Gold medal – first place	2016 Rio de Janeiro	1500 m freestyle
Silver medal – second place	2020 Tokyo	800 m freestyle
Silver medal – second place	2024 Paris	1500 m freestyle
Bronze medal – third place	2020 Tokyo	10 km open water
Bronze medal – third place	2024 Paris	800 m freestyle
World Aquatics Championships
Gold medal – first place	2015 Kazan	1500 m freestyle
Gold medal – first place	2017 Budapest	1500 m freestyle
Gold medal – first place	2019 Gwangju	800 m freestyle
Gold medal – first place	2022 Budapest	1500 m freestyle
Gold medal – first place	2022 Budapest	10 km open water
Gold medal – first place	2023 Fukuoka	Team open water
Silver medal – second place	2015 Kazan	800 m freestyle
Silver medal – second place	2019 Gwangju	Team open water
Silver medal – second place	2022 Budapest	5 km open water
Silver medal – second place	2023 Fukuoka	5 km open water
Silver medal – second place	2024 Doha	Team open water
Silver medal – second place	2025 Singapore	5 km open water
Silver medal – second place	2025 Singapore	10 km open water
Silver medal – second place	2025 Singapore	Team open water
Bronze medal – third place	2013 Barcelona	1500 m freestyle
Bronze medal – third place	2017 Budapest	800 m freestyle
Bronze medal – third place	2019 Gwangju	1500 m freestyle
Bronze medal – third place	2022 Budapest	Team open water
Bronze medal – third place	2024 Doha	800 m freestyle
World Championships (SC)
Gold medal – first place	2014 Doha	1500 m freestyle
Gold medal – first place	2022 Melbourne	800 m freestyle
Gold medal – first place	2022 Melbourne	1500 m freestyle
Silver medal – second place	2012 Istanbul	1500 m freestyle
Silver medal – second place	2016 Windsor	1500 m freestyle
Silver medal – second place	2018 Hangzhou	1500 m freestyle
European Championships (LC)
Gold medal – first place	2012 Debrecen	1500 m freestyle
Gold medal – first place	2014 Berlin	800 m freestyle
Gold medal – first place	2014 Berlin	1500 m freestyle
Gold medal – first place	2016 London	800 m freestyle
Gold medal – first place	2016 London	1500 m freestyle
Gold medal – first place	2022 Rome	800 m freestyle
Silver medal – second place	2012 Debrecen	800 m freestyle
Silver medal – second place	2018 Glasgow	800 m freestyle
Silver medal – second place	2020 Budapest	800 m freestyle
Silver medal – second place	2020 Budapest	1500 m freestyle
Silver medal – second place	2022 Rome	1500 m freestyle
Bronze medal – third place	2018 Glasgow	1500 m freestyle
European Open Water C'ships
Gold medal – first place	2020 Budapest	5 km open water
Gold medal – first place	2020 Budapest	10 km open water
Gold medal – first place	2020 Budapest	Team relay
Gold medal – first place	2022 Rome	5 km open water
Gold medal – first place	2022 Rome	Team relay
Gold medal – first place	2024 Belgrade	10 km open water
Gold medal – first place	2025 Stari Grad	5 km open water
Silver medal – second place	2026 Paris	Team open water
Silver medal – second place	2025 Stari Grad	Team relay
Bronze medal – third place	2026 Paris	5 km open water
European Championships (SC)
Gold medal – first place	2012 Chartres	1500 m freestyle
Gold medal – first place	2015 Netanya	1500 m freestyle
Gold medal – first place	2019 Glasgow	1500 m freestyle
Gold medal – first place	2021 Kazan	800 m freestyle
Silver medal – second place	2017 Copenhagen	1500 m freestyle
Silver medal – second place	2021 Kazan	1500 m freestyle
Mediterranean Games
Gold medal – first place	2018 Tarragona	400 m freestyle
Gold medal – first place	2018 Tarragona	1500 m freestyle
Universiade
Gold medal – first place	2017 Taipei	800 m freestyle
Gold medal – first place	2017 Taipei	1500 m freestyle
Gold medal – first place	2017 Taipei	10 km marathon
European Junior Championships
Gold medal – first place	2011 Belgrade	1500 m freestyle
Bronze medal – third place	2011 Belgrade	800 m freestyle

Gregorio Paltrinieri (Italian: [ɡreˈɡɔːrjo paltriˈnjɛːri]; born 5 September 1994) is an Italian competitive swimmer. He is a former world record holder in the short course 1500-meter freestyle. He holds the European record in the long course 800-meter and 1500-meter freestyle events with times of 7:39.27 and 14:32.80, respectively. In the 1500-meter freestyle, he is a 2016 Olympic, three-time world long course, two-time world short course, three-time European long course, and three-time European short course champion. In the 800-meter freestyle, he is a 2019 world long course, 2022 world short course, three-time European long course, and 2021 European short course champion. In the 10 kilometre open water swim, he is a 2022 world and 2020 European champion. In the 5 kilometre open water swim, he is a two-time European champion.

== Personal life ==
Paltrinieri is engaged to Olympic gold medal fencer Rossella Fiamingo.

== Swimming career ==
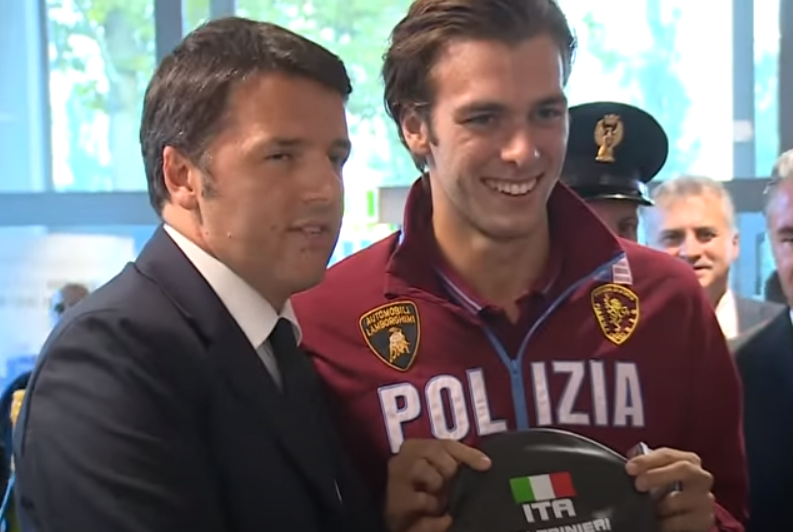
Paltrinieri with the Italian Premier Matteo Renzi in 2015.

Paltrinieri started swimming at a very young age, and until the age of 12, he specialized in breaststroke. However, as he grew, he converted to freestyle, specializing in the longer pool distances.

=== 2011: Junior ===
His first international success came as a 16-year-old at the 2011 European Junior Swimming Championships in Belgrade, where he won the 1500-meter gold and an 800-meter bronze. Having qualified for the World championships in Shanghai, he did not progress further than the heats, but a few weeks later at the World Junior Championships in Lima, Peru, he was back on the podium with a 1500-meter freestyle silver and an 800-meter bronze.

=== 2012: Summer Olympics and European Champion ===
In March 2012 Paltrinieri won the Italian 800-meter freestyle title, and two months later, he left everyone in his wake at the European Championships in Debrecen, defeating renowned Hungarians Gergő Kis and Gergely Gyurta in the 1500-meter. His time of 14:48.92 qualified him for the Olympics and, at the time, was the year's second-fastest 1500-meter swim, breaking the championship record. He is trained by Stefano Morini. At 2012 Summer Olympics, the 17-year-old Italian advanced to his first Olympic final with the 4th fastest time of 14:50.11. In the final he finished 5th in 14:51.92.

At the end of 2012 Paltrinieri finished 2nd in the 1500-meter freestyle event at the 2012 FINA World Swimming Championships (25 m), and was later awarded a gold medal after a positive doping test for Danish swimmer Mads Glæsner. However, upon appeal to the Court of Arbitration for Sport, Glæsner's 1500-meter freestyle gold medal was reinstated based on the fact that a test after that race, two days after his initial positive test following the 400-meter free, was clean. This means that Paltrinieri was returned to his silver medal position in the 1500-meter freestyle.

=== 2013 World Aquatics Championships ===
Paltrinieri competed for Italy at 2013 World Aquatics Championships. He reached his first 800-meter freestyle final at a long course world championship event finishing sixth in 7:50.29. In the 1500-meter freestyle event Paltrinieri won a bronze medal with a time of 14:45.38, establishing a new national record.

=== 2014 ===
In 2014 Paltrinieri at the Italian Swimming Championships in Riccione finished second in 800-meter freestyle event with a time of 7:43.01, behind Gabriele Detti who established a new European record in the distance. Three days later Paltrinieri established a new national record of 14:44.50 in the 1500-meter freestyle event. The day before the meet, Paltrinieri had swum an unofficial world best time of 50:56.50 in the 5 km (long course pool) at the Italian indoor distance championships in Riccione.

In August, at the 2014 European Aquatics Championships, Paltrinieri won the 800-meter and 1500-meter freestyle events establishing the new European record of 14:39.93; with this result he became only the fifth swimmer ever to swim under 14:40.00 in the 1500-meter freestyle long course. At the 2014 FINA World Swimming Championships (25 m) in Doha, Paltrinieri became World champion for the first time with the new European record of 14:16.10, which was also the second fastest time ever swum behind Grant Hackett's world record.

=== 2015: World Champion and World Record Holder ===
At the 2015 World Aquatics Championships, in Kazan, Paltrinieri won the silver medal in the 800-meter, losing to Sun Yang. Later he won the 1500-meter, setting a new European record, a race in which Sun did not take part despite having qualified for the final with the second best time after Paltrinieri.

At the end of the year Paltrineri took part at the 2015 European Short Course Swimming Championships in Netanya (Israel); here he established a new 1500-meter freestyle world record of 14:08.06 winning the gold medal ahead fellow Italian and friend Gabriele Detti. The previous record set in 2001 by Grant Hackett was beaten by 2.04 seconds. With the gold medal, Paltrinieri also became the simultaneous holder of the world and European titles, in long course and short course, in the 1500-meter freestyle event.

=== 2016: Olympic champion ===
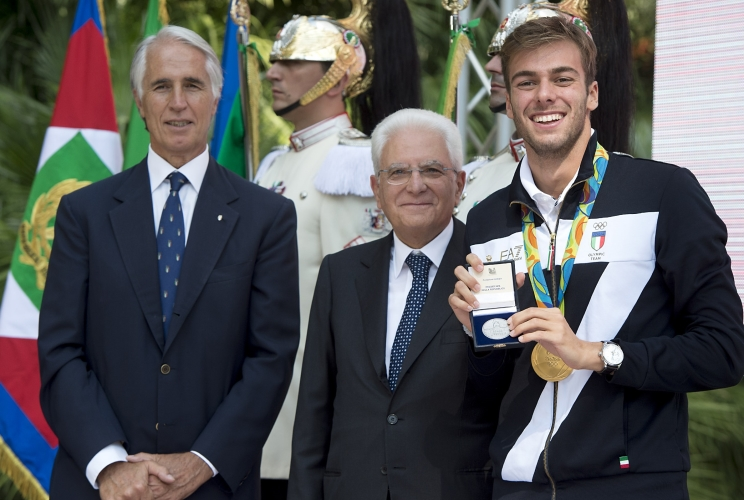
Paltrinieri (right) with the Italian CONI President Gianni Malagò and the Italian Republic President Sergio Mattarella in 2016.

At the 2016 Summer Olympics in Rio de Janeiro, Brazil, Paltrinieri won the gold medal in the 1500-meter freestyle in a time of 14:34.57, after qualifying for the final ranking first in the preliminaries with a time of 14:44.51. He shared the podium with fellow Italian Gabriele Detti, who won the bronze medal with a 14:40.86 to finish less than seven seconds behind Paltrinieri.

=== 2017–2019 ===
In 2017, Paltrinieri confirmed his World Championship gold medal in the 1500-meter freestyle at the 2017 World Aquatics Championships held in Budapest. He also won a bronze medal in the 800-meter race, won by teammate Gabriele Detti.

At the 2019 World Aquatics Championships in Gwangju, Paltrinieri won the gold medal in the 800-meter, setting the new European record in 7:39.27. Later, after two-straight world titles in the 1500-meter, Paltinieri lost the race but ended with the bronze medal. After placing 6th in the men's 10 km in what was his first World Championships open water race, Paltrinieri won the silver medal in the mixed 5 km team relay.

=== 2020 ===
In August 2020 at the 57th Settecolli Trophy, Paltrinieri swam a time of 14:33.10 in the 1500-meter freestyle. This performance registered as the second-fastest swim ever (behind only the world record swim by Sun Yang), as well as a new European Record.

=== 2021 ===
At the European Championships in Budapest 2020, held in May 2021 due to the COVID-19 pandemic, Paltrinieri won three gold medals in the three races in which he participated in the open water, the 5 and 10 km and the team race. In the same event he also won double silver medal respectively in the 800-meter freestyle and in the 1500-meter freestyle.

In mid-June, with the 2020 Summer Olympics just one month away, Paltrinieri contracted mononucleosis and reduced significantly his pool training. Despite the disrupted preparation, Paltrinieri won the silver medal in the 800-meter freestyle and the bronze medal in the 10 km open water marathon. As the reigning Olympic champion in the 1500-meter freestyle, he failed to defend his gold medal, finishing in fourth place.

Finishing off the year in December, Paltrinieri competed at the Abu Dhabi Aquatics Festival, held in relation to the 2021 World Short Course Championships, winning a gold medal with his Italy relay teammates in the open water 4×1500 metre mixed relay event. On the fifth day of the World Championships, Paltrinieri ranked fourth in the prelims heats of the 1500-meter freestyle, qualifying for the final with a time of 14:28.11. The following day he placed fourth in the final of the 1500-meter freestyle in 14:21.00. Paltrinieri also participated in a beach clean-up at Al Bahia Beach the week of World Championships competition to help protect the natural habitat of the hawksbill sea turtle.

=== 2022 ===
On the first day of competition on the first leg of the 2022 Marathon Swim World Series, held in May at Albarquel in Setúbal, Portugal, Paltrinieri won the gold medal in the 10 kilometre swim, swimming through waves and currents to finish first in 1 hour, 53 minutes, and 45 seconds. The second and final day, he helped win the silver medal in the 4×1500-meter mixed gender open water relay, anchoring the second Italy relay team across the finish line only behind the first Italy relay team.

==== 2022 World Aquatics Championships ====
2022 World Championships
Gold medal – first place	1500 m freestyle	14:32.80 (ER, CR)
Gold medal – first place	10 km open water	1:50:56.8
Silver medal – second place	5 km open water	52:52.7
Bronze medal – third place	6 km team relay	1:04:43.0

At the 2022 World Aquatics Championships, held in Budapest, Hungary, he ranked fourth in the 800-meter freestyle preliminaries on the third day of pool swimming competition at Danube Arena, advancing to the final with a time of 7:46.24. In the final the following day, he placed fourth with a time of 7:41.19. He swam a 14:54.56 in the preliminaries of the 1500-meter freestyle three days later, ranking seventh and qualifying for the final. With a European record, Italian record, and Championships record time of 14:32.80 in the final, he won the gold medal. The following day, he started open water swimming competition with the mixed 6 km team relay, helping win the bronze in a final relay time of 1:04:43.0. On the second day of open water competition, he won the silver medal in the 5 km swim, finishing less than four seconds behind the gold medalist, Florian Wellbrock of Germany, in a time of 52 minutes, 52.7 seconds. Two days later, he won the gold medal in the 10 km open water swim with a time of 1:50:56.8, which was less than two seconds ahead of silver medalist and fellow Italian Domenico Acerenza.

Ten days after he concluded his competition at the World Championships, Paltrinieri won the 10 km swim with a time of 1:51:37.85 at the second leg of the 2022 Marathon Swim World Series, held at Parc de la Villette in Paris, France. The second day of the leg, he helped achieve a time of 1:07:51.74 in the 4×1500-meter team relay and win the gold medal.

==== 2022 European Aquatics Championships ====
Day two of the 2022 European Aquatics Championships, held in Rome in August, Paltrinieri ranked third in the preliminaries of the 800-meter freestyle, qualifying for the final with a time of 7:48.91. In the final, the next day, he finished in a Championships record time of 7:40.86, sharing the podium with silver medalist Lukas Märtens of Germany and bronze medalist Lorenzo Galossi, also of Italy. On the fifth day, he swam a 15:01.74 in the preliminaries of the 1500 metre freestyle, qualifying for the final ranking third. He finished in a time of 14:39.79 in the final to win the silver medal. The tenth day of competition, he won the gold medal in the 5 km open water swim with a time of 52:13.5. In the 10 km open water swim the next day, he placed seventh with a time of 1:51:12.7. For his final event, the open water mixed team relay later in the day, he swam the third leg of the relay, challenging the third leg swimmer from Hungary, Dávid Betlehem, and contributed to a final time of 59:43.1 to win the gold medal a little over 10 seconds ahead of the team from Hungary.

==== 2022 World Series: Eilat ====
In Eilat, Israel, in November as part of the fifth and final leg of the Marathon Swim World Series for the year, Paltrinieri helped finish in a time of 1:06:37.00 in the 4×1500-meter mixed open water relay and win the bronze medal. The following day he won the 10 km open water swim with a time of 1:46:41.80, sharing the podium with Marc-Antoine Olivier of France and Dávid Betlehem, and bringing his overall World Series ranking up to first to tie Kristóf Rasovszky of Hungary for the title for the year.

==== 2022 World Short Course Championships ====
2022 World Championships (SC)
Gold medal – first place	1500 m freestyle	14:16.88
Gold medal – first place	800 m freestyle	7:29.99 (CR)

On the first day in Melbourne, Australia, for the 2022 World Short Course Championships contested at the Melbourne Sports and Aquatic Centre, Paltrinieri won the gold medal in the 1500-meter freestyle with a time of 14:16.88. In his other individual event, the first-ever male 800-meter freestyle contested at a World Short Course Championships, he won the inaugural world title and gold medal with a Championships record and personal best time of 7:29.99.

== International championships (50 m and open water) ==
Meet	400 freestyle	800 freestyle	1500 freestyle	400 medley	5 kilometre	10 kilometre	open water team relay
Junior level
EJC 2011	14th	3rd place, bronze medalist(s)	1st place, gold medalist(s)	DNS	—N/a	—N/a	—N/a
WJC 2011		3rd place, bronze medalist(s)	2nd place, silver medalist(s)		—N/a	—N/a	—N/a
Senior level
EC 2012		2nd place, silver medalist(s)	1st place, gold medalist(s)		—N/a	—N/a	—N/a
OG 2012		—N/a	5th		—N/a		—N/a
WC 2013		6th	3rd place, bronze medalist(s)				
EC 2014		1st place, gold medalist(s)	1st place, gold medalist(s)				
WC 2015		2nd place, silver medalist(s)	1st place, gold medalist(s)				
EC 2016		1st place, gold medalist(s)	1st place, gold medalist(s)				
OG 2016		—N/a	1st place, gold medalist(s)		—N/a		—N/a
WC 2017		3rd place, bronze medalist(s)	1st place, gold medalist(s)				
WUG 2017		1st place, gold medalist(s)	1st place, gold medalist(s)		—N/a	1st place, gold medalist(s)	—N/a
MG 2018	1st place, gold medalist(s)	—N/a	1st place, gold medalist(s)		—N/a		—N/a
EC 2018		2nd place, silver medalist(s)	3rd place, bronze medalist(s)				
WC 2019		1st place, gold medalist(s)	3rd place, bronze medalist(s)			6th	2nd place, silver medalist(s)
EC 2020		2nd place, silver medalist(s)	2nd place, silver medalist(s)		1st place, gold medalist(s)	1st place, gold medalist(s)	1st place, gold medalist(s)
OG 2020		2nd place, silver medalist(s)	4th		—N/a	3rd place, bronze medalist(s)	—N/a
WC 2022		4th	1st place, gold medalist(s)		2nd place, silver medalist(s)	1st place, gold medalist(s)	2nd place, silver medalist(s)
EC 2022		1st place, gold medalist(s)	2nd place, silver medalist(s)		1st place, gold medalist(s)	7th	1st place, gold medalist(s)

== International championships (25 m) ==
Meet	400 freestyle	800 freestyle	1500 freestyle
EC 2012	8th (h)	—N/a	1st place, gold medalist(s)
WC 2012		—N/a	2nd place, silver medalist(s)
EC 2013	31st	—N/a	8th
WC 2014		—N/a	1st place, gold medalist(s)
EC 2015		—N/a	1st place, gold medalist(s)
WC 2016		—N/a	2nd place, silver medalist(s)
EC 2017	15th	—N/a	2nd place, silver medalist(s)
WC 2018		—N/a	2nd place, silver medalist(s)
EC 2019			1st place, gold medalist(s)
EC 2021		1st place, gold medalist(s)	2nd place, silver medalist(s)
WC 2021		—N/a	4th
WC 2022		1st place, gold medalist(s)	1st place, gold medalist(s)

== Personal bests ==
Long course
Event	Time	Meet	Date	Note(s)
200 m freestyle	1:50.96	Italian Championships	3 April 2012	
400 m freestyle	3:46.29	XVIII Mediterranean Games	25 June 2018	
800 m freestyle	7:39.27	2019 World Aquatics Championships	24 July 2019	ER
1500 m freestyle	14:32.80	2022 World Aquatics Championships	25 June 2022	ER
5000 m freestyle	50:56.50	Italian indoor distance championships	7 April 2014	
400 m individual medley	4:23.26	Energy for Swim	9 August 2017	

Short course
Event	Time	Meet	Date	Note(s)
200 m freestyle	1:50.00	Italian Championships	26 March 2013	
400 m freestyle	3:45.17	2012 European Short Course Swimming Championships	22 November 2012	
800 m freestyle	7:29.99	2022 World Short Course Championships	17 December 2022	
1500 m freestyle	14:08.06	2015 European Short Course Swimming Championships	4 December 2015	former WR

== Swimming World Cup circuits ==
The following medals Paltrinieri has won at Swimming World Cup circuits.

Edition	Gold medals	Silver medals	Bronze medals	Total
2012	0	0	1	1
2013	3	0	1	4
2015	2	0	0	2
Total	5	0	2	7

== Marathon Swim World Series circuits ==
Paltrinieri has won the following medals at Marathon Swim World Series circuits.

Edition	Individual			Relay			Total
Edition	Gold	Silver	Bronze	Gold	Silver	Bronze	Total
2018	0	1	1	–	–	–	2
2021	0	0	1	1	0	0	2
2022	3	0	0	1	1	1	6
Total	3	1	2	2	1	1	10

== See also ==
- Italian swimmers multiple medalists at the international competitions

Records
Preceded by Grant Hackett	Men's 1500 metre freestyle World record holder (short course); 4 December 2015 – present	Succeeded by Incumbent
Preceded by Gabriele Detti	Men's 800-metre freestyle European record holder (long course); 5 August 2015 – present	Succeeded by Incumbent
Preceded by Yury Prilukov	Men's 1500 metre freestyle European record holder (long course); 20 August 2014 – present	Succeeded by Incumbent
Preceded by Vincenzo Nibali	Italian Sportsman of the Year; 2015–2016	Succeeded by Gianluigi Buffon
