= Ivan Puskovitch =

American swimmer (born 2001)

Ivan Puskovitch OLY
Personal information
- Nationality: American
- Born: February 28, 2001 (age 25) Scranton, Pennsylvania
- Height: 5 ft 11 in (180 cm)

Sport
- Country: United States
- Sport: Swimming
- Event: Open Water
- Strokes: Freestyle
- Club: TSM Aquatics; Santa Monica, CA.
- College team: U. Southern Cal. (2019-2022); West Virginia University (2024)
- Coach: Dick Shoulberg (GAAC.); Chris Lear, (GAAC, EAAC, EA.); Dave Salo (USC); Mohammad Khadembashi (TSM)
Medal record
U.S. Open Championships
Bronze medal – third place	2025 Austin	1500 m freestyle

Ivan Puskovitch (/ˈpʌskəvɪtʃ/ PUSS-kə-vitch; born February 28, 2001, in Scranton, PA) is an American swimmer and a 2024 Summer Olympics team member who competed for the United States in the 10 kilometer open water event.

== Early life ==
Puskovitch was born February 28, 2001 in Scranton, Pennsylvania, and began competitive swimming at age 5 with a team at the local YMCA in Scranton. He broke the national age group record in the 500-yard freestyle at the age of ten. He briefly swam for Germantown Academy where he was coached by Dick Shoulberg and Chris Lear. He swam at Episcopal Academy in middle school and high school where he graduated in 2019, and was coached by Chris Lear. At Episcopal Academy, he set school and pool records in the 200 Individual Medley, the 500 freestyle and relays.

== Collegiate years ==
Puskovitch swam for the U. Southern Cal. from 2019-2022 where he received a degree in Psychology with a minor in Sports Media, and was coached by Dave Salo. He swam for West Virginia University as a graduate student in the 2023-2024 season where he was coached by Vic Riggs. While enrolled at West Virginia but swimming for TSM he qualified for the 2024 Olympics. While at West Virginia, Puskovitch set a school record 1650-yard freestyle and the 1000-yard freestyle. While at West Virginia, he was a Big-12 First Team honoree.

Swimming for TSM Aquatics in Santa Monica while attending USC and WVU under Head Coach Mohammed Khadembashi, Puskovitch began to make significant improvements in his times. Around June, 2023, eight months before the Olympics, Puskovitch was hit by a car while riding a bicycle requiring reconstructive facial surgery that interrupted his training for two months.

== 2024 Paris Olympics ==
Puskovitch represented the United States at the 2024 World Championship in February 2024 in Doha, Qatar. where he placed fourteenth Men's 10K, helping him to qualify for the 2024 Olympic Games.

Puskovitch became only the fifth American male to qualify for the Olympics in open water swimming and was the first swimmer from West Virginia University men’s swim team to participate in the Olympics. He represented the United States at the 2024 Summer Olympics in Paris where he placed nineteenth overall in the 10K marathon swim.

=== Honors ===
Puskovitch received the 2025 Golden Goggle Awards. He was a 2025 Fran Crippen Open Water Athlete of the Year. He is a multiple medalist at U.S.A. Swimming Junior Nationals for pool and open water and Open Water Nationals. In 2026 at Open Water Nationals in Florida he won all three men’s races.
