= Albarquel =

Public beach in Portugal

- Beach
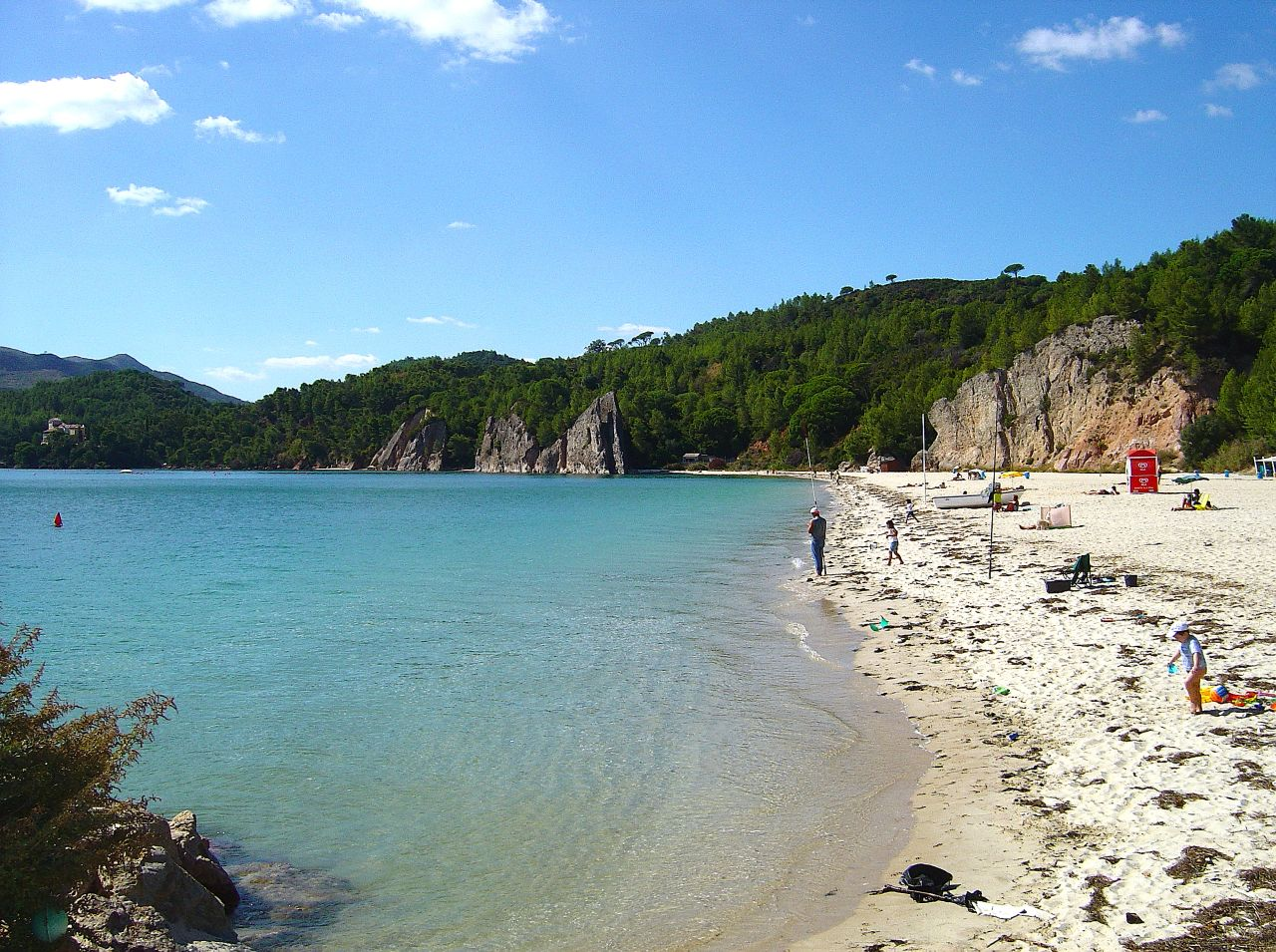
- Albarquel Beach coastline
- Interactive map of Albarquel
- Location: Setúbal, Portugal
- Water bodies: Sado River

Dimensions
  - Length: 400 metres (1,300 ft)
  - Width: 50 metres (160 ft)

Albarquel Beach (Praia de Albarquel) is a beach located in Setúbal, Portugal 30km southeast of Lisbon. The beach is on a bay overlooking the Tróia Peninsula and the city. The area is suitable for swimming, boating, windsurfing, and kitesurfing.

In 2020, the Municipality of Setúbal started a program focused on making beaches accessible to everyone. Information on beach plaques is in Portuguese, English, French, and Braille. Solar-powered audio guides are available in Portuguese, English, French, and Spanish to help disabled guests safely move around the area.

Other features expected to be introduced are accessible entrances into the water, including mats and walkways; the erection of a pergola made of recycled plastic to provide shade; accessible showers and bathrooms; and beach wheelchairs, one made for walking along the shore and one for venturing into the water. The Municipality also intends to train staff on inclusive practices and has connected with the physiotherapy, nursing, sport, speech therapy, and Portuguese sign language departments at the Polytechnic Institute of Setúbal to provide on-site assistance. In 2020, the beach was ranked the #1 most accessible beach in Portugal and received the Praia + Acessível Award which is sponsored by the National Institute of Rehabilitation, the Portuguese Environment Agency, and Turismo de Portugal. Turismo de Portugal's Valorizar Program, which promotes accessible tourism, is helping fund the €400,000 project.

In 2021, beach cameras were installed so visitors can see beach conditions ahead of time and to provide additional safety measures.

The Municipality also participates in Arrábida Sem Carros, a program prohibiting car access to beaches during peak times to prevent traffic congestion. Public transportation is promoted during these restrictions. A pedestrian walkway between the Albarquel Urban Park and the beach was started in 2019 and finished in 2021, providing another access route. A shared electric bike system was introduced in Setúbal in 2021 as well.

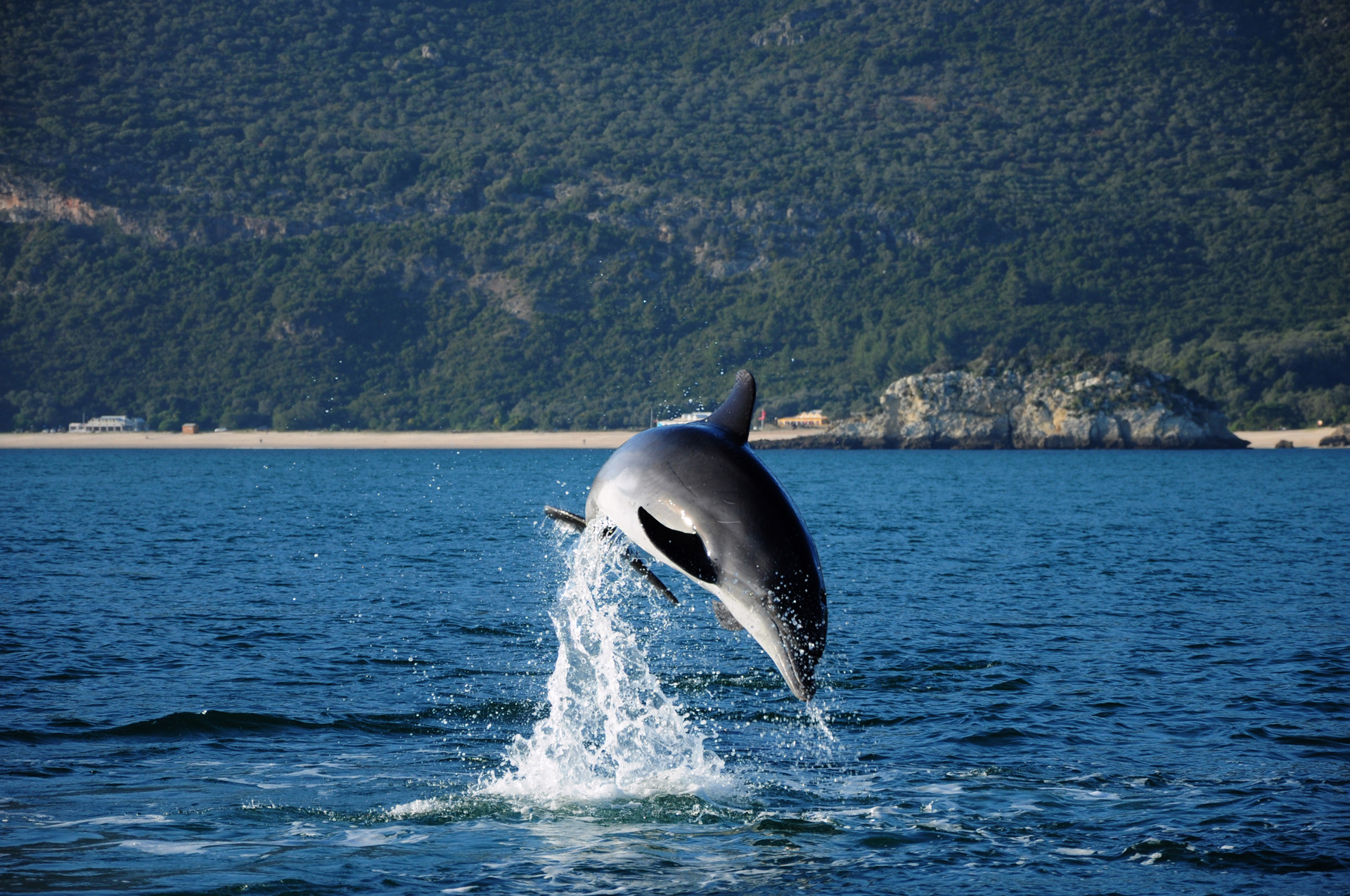
A dolphin seen from the nearby Arrábida Natural Park

Sea life along the beach and in surrounding areas includes bottlenose dolphins and occasionally sharks, including sandy dogfish, which eats molluscs and fish. Safety of the area is closely monitored by the maritime police.

Nearby points of interest include the Albarquel viewpoint (Pau da Consolação), Arrábida Natural Park, and Figueirinha Beach (Praia da Figueirinha). The 17th-century Albarquel Fort is located in the Natural Park just off the beach; €1.6 million renovations of the long-abandoned building began in 2018 and were completed in 2021. The building sits at the mouth of the Sado River and overlooks the beach. A bunker was built during World War II behind the fort and is connected by tunnels to the complex in the Natural Park.

Also nearby is the Herdade da Comenda and its 17th-century Palácio da Comenda, which overlooks the beach and previously housed people such as Vasco da Gama, Queen Dona Maria II, and Count Ernest Armand. In the late 19th and early 20th centuries, Raul Lino renovated and redesigned the mansion in the Casa Portugesa style. In the early 1960s, Jackie Kennedy lived there with her children following her husband's assassination. The estate sold in 2019 for €16 million after sitting empty for 10 years after the death of its last owner, businessman António Xavier de Lima. As the new owners began renovating the dilapidated buildings and land, the parking lot, picnic area, and cycling and walking paths were closed off to beachgoers. These areas are on private land but had been used publicly for more than a decade. The city council is currently fighting to reclaim the pseudo-public spaces. The development company plans to build an archaeological center on the 600 hectares of land.
