= Florian Wellbrock =

German swimmer (born 1997)

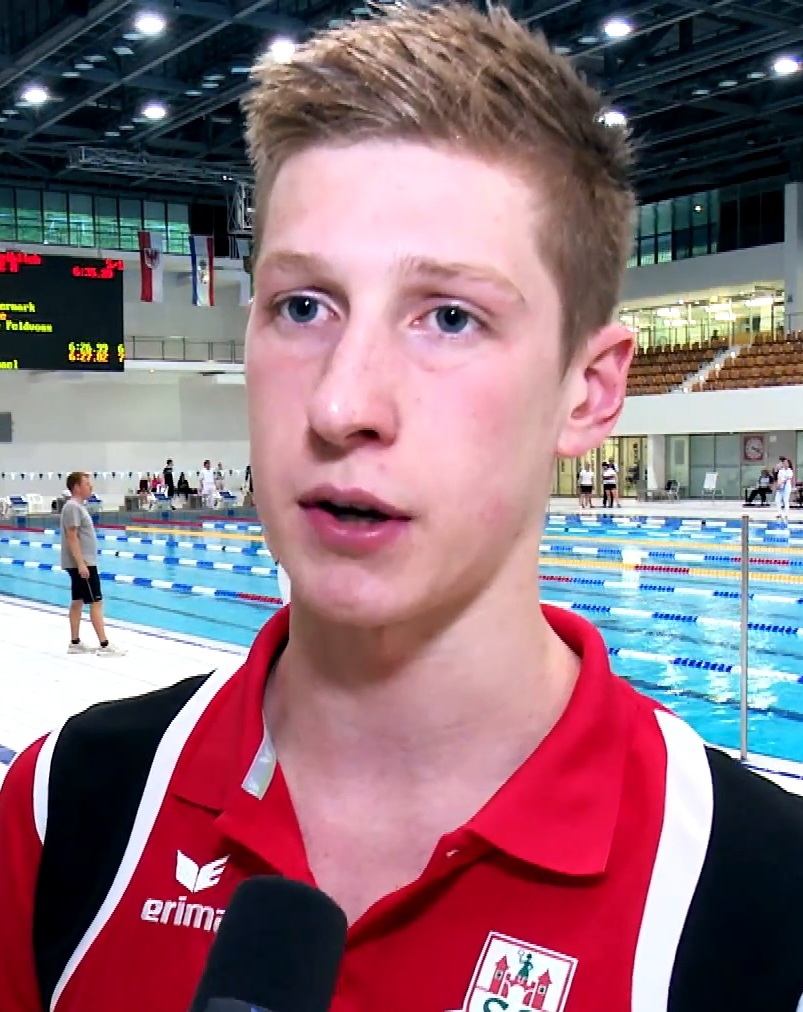
- Wellbrock in 2017

Personal information
- Nationality: German
- Born: 19 August 1997 (age 29) Bremen, Germany
- Height: 1.92 m (6 ft 4 in)
- Weight: 76 kg (168 lb)

Sport
- Sport: Swimming
- Strokes: Freestyle
- Club: SC Magdeburg
Medal record
Men's swimming
Representing Germany
Olympic Games
Gold medal – first place	2020 Tokyo	10 km open water
Bronze medal – third place	2020 Tokyo	1500 m freestyle
World Championships (LC)
Gold medal – first place	2019 Gwangju	1500 m freestyle
Gold medal – first place	2019 Gwangju	10 km open water
Gold medal – first place	2022 Budapest	5 km open water
Gold medal – first place	2022 Budapest	Mixed 4 × 1500 m relay
Gold medal – first place	2023 Fukuoka	5 km open water
Gold medal – first place	2023 Fukuoka	10 km open water
Gold medal – first place	2025 Singapore	5 km open water
Gold medal – first place	2025 Singapore	10 km open water
Gold medal – first place	2025 Singapore	3 km knockout sprint
Gold medal – first place	2025 Singapore	Mixed 4 × 1500 m relay
Silver medal – second place	2022 Budapest	800 m freestyle
Silver medal – second place	2024 Doha	1500 m freestyle
Bronze medal – third place	2022 Budapest	1500 m freestyle
Bronze medal – third place	2022 Budapest	10 km open water
World Championships (SC)
Gold medal – first place	2021 Abu Dhabi	1500 m freestyle
Silver medal – second place	2024 Budapest	800 m freestyle
Silver medal – second place	2024 Budapest	1500 m freestyle
European Championships (LC)
Gold medal – first place	2018 Glasgow	1500 m freestyle
Gold medal – first place	2026 Paris	10 km open water
Gold medal – first place	2026 Paris	5 km open water
Gold medal – first place	2026 Paris	Team open water
Silver medal – second place	2018 Glasgow	Team open water
Silver medal – second place	2020 Budapest	Team relay
Bronze medal – third place	2018 Glasgow	800 m freestyle
Bronze medal – third place	2020 Budapest	10 km open water
European Championships (SC)
Gold medal – first place	2021 Kazan	1500 m freestyle
Silver medal – second place	2021 Kazan	800 m freestyle
Bronze medal – third place	2025 Lublin	1500 m freestyle
Pan Pacific Championships
Gold medal – first place	2026 Irvine	10 km open water

Florian Wellbrock (born 19 August 1997) is a German competitive swimmer. He is the world record holder in the short course 1500 metre freestyle. He is an Olympic champion, multiple World Champion and European champion, in both long and short courses. At the 2020 Summer Olympics, he won gold in the 10 kilometre open water and bronze in the 1500 metre freestyle. In total, Wellbrock has won 28 medals at international competitions of which 20 are gold. This includes his gold medal at the Olympic games, six at the World Championships, six at the Swimming World Cup and six at the Open Water Swimming World Cup.

== Career ==
At the age of 17, Wellbrock competed in his first international competition as part of the German mixed 4×100 metre relay team at the 17th Luxembourg Euro Meet.

In 2016, Wellbrock attended the 18th Luxembourg Euro Meet, where he placed seventh in the 1500 metre freestyle with a time of 15:27.19.

=== 2016 Rio Olympics ===
In May 2016, Wellbrock returned to the German Swimming Championships (long course), where he set a new personal best of 14:55.49. This time broke the under-20 age group record, put him in the top ten 1500 metre freestyle swimmers in that year, and qualified him for the 2016 Summer Olympics. The time was just over 5 seconds off the German national record set by Jorg Hoffman in 1991, which was a world record at the time.

At the 2016 Summer Olympics, Wellbrock swam in the heats of the 1500 metres freestyle, where he finished with a time of 15:23.88 which was just under 30 seconds slower than his personal best set around 3 months earlier. This time did not qualify him for the final.

=== 2016–2020 ===
19 days after his Olympic debut, Wellbrock returned to competition at day two of the 2016 FINA World Cup in Berlin, where he again finished first in the 1500 metre freestyle with a time of 14:35.79.

At the 2019 World Aquatics Championships, he became the first swimmer to win both the 1500m freestyle and the 10 km open-water race at an international competition. Wellbrock won the 10 kilometre open water swim in 1:47:55.90 with the silver and bronze medalists finishing within two seconds of his time.

=== 2020 Summer Olympics ===
Wellbrock qualified to represent Germany at the 2020 Summer Olympics, held in Tokyo, Japan and postponed to summer of 2021 due to the COVID-19 pandemic. His first medal of the Olympic Games was in the 1500 metre freestyle, where he won the bronze medal. Wellbrock also won a gold medal in the 10 kilometre open water swim a few days later with a time of 1:48:33.7, which was over 25 seconds faster than the second-place finisher. His gold medal was the first won in the event at an Olympic Games by a swimmer representing Germany. His Olympic medals in pool swimming and open water swimming marked the second time a swimmer won medals in both disciplines at one Olympic Games and he was closely followed by the third swimmer to do so, Gregorio Paltrinieri of Italy who also won a medal in each discipline at the 2020 Summer Olympics only Gregorio Paltrinieri won his second medal, a bronze medal in the 10 kilometre open water swim, seconds after Welllbrock and thus Wellbrock became the second swimmer in history to achieve the feat and Gregorio Paltrinieri the third.

=== 2021–present ===
At the 2021 European Short Course Swimming Championships, held at the Palace of Water Sports in Kazan, Russia, Wellbrock won a gold medal in the 1500 metre freestyle on 4 November with a time of 14:09.88. On 7 November, Wellbrock won the silver medal in the 800 metre freestyle in 7:27.99, finishing five-hundredths of a second behind gold medalist in the event Gregorio Paltrinieri.

At the Abu Dhabi Aquatics Festival, held in parallel with the 2021 World Short Course Championships, in December 2021, Wellbrock won a bronze medal as part of the open water 4×1500 metre mixed relay event. In his individual event, the 10 kilometre open water swim, Wellbrock won the gold medal in a time of 1:48:09.4, finishing over two seconds ahead of silver medalist Domenico Acerenza of Italy. As part of the World Championships, Wellbrock swam a 14:25.79 in the prelims heats of the 1500 metre freestyle on 20 December, qualifying for the final the following day ranking third. In the final of the 1500 metre freestyle, Wellbrock set a new world record with a time of 14:06.88 and won the gold medal. Wellbrock also co-hosted a swimming clinic at the venue of the World Championships, Etihad Arena, with Anthony Ervin of the United States.

With Europeans swimmers permitted to compete in the open water events at the 2026 Pan Pacific Swimming Championships, Wellbrock won gold in the 10 km event.

== Awards and honours ==
- FINA, Top 10 Moments: 2020 Summer Olympics (#9 for winning the first gold medal of his Olympic career in the 10 kilometre open water swim as a 23-year-old)
- FINA, Athlete of the Year, open water swimming (male): 2021
- Swimming World, Open Water Swimmer of the Year (male): 2019, 2021
- SwimSwam, Swammy Award, Open Water Swimmer of the Year (male): 2019, 2021
- SwimSwam, Top 100 (Men's): 2021 (#18), 2022 (#11)
- LEN, Best Open Water Swimmer (Male): 2021

== Personal life ==
Wellbrock married Sarah Köhler of Germany in January 2022 after getting engaged in December 2020.

== See also ==
- List of World Aquatics Championships medalists in swimming (men)
- List of World Swimming Championships (25 m) medalists (men)
