= Marcello Guidi =

Italian swimmer (born 1997)

Personal information
- Nationality: Italian
- Born: 6 May 1997 (age 29)

Sport
- Country: Italy
- Sport: Swimming
Medal record
Men's swimming
Representing Italy
World Championships
Silver medal – second place	2025 Singapore	Team open water
European Championships
Silver medal – second place	2026 Paris	Team open water
World Beach Games
Gold medal – first place	2019 Doha	5 km open water

Marcello Guidi (born 6 May 1997) is an Italian swimmer who specializes in open water swimming.

== Career ==
Guidi competed at the 2025 World Aquatics Championships and won a silver medal in the mixed team relay event with a time of 1:09:15.4.

In August 2026, he competed at the 2026 European Aquatics Championships and won a silver medal in the mixed team relay with a time of 1:03:41.34. He also finished in fifth place in the 10 km and sixth place in the 5 km open water events.
