= Athanasios Kynigakis =

Greek swimmer (born 1998)

Personal information
- Full name: Athanasios Charalampos Kynigakis
- Nickname: Alkis
- Born: 21 August 1998 (age 28) Chania, Greece
- Height: 183 cm (6 ft 0 in)
- Weight: 80 kg (176 lb)

Sport
- Country: Greece
- Sport: Swimming
- Event: Marathon swimming

Athanasios Charalampos "Alkis" Kynigakis (Greek: Αθανάσιος Χαράλαμπος "Άλκης" Κυνηγάκης, born 21 August 1998) is a Greek marathon swimmer. He represented his country at the 2020 and 2024 Summer Olympics. At the 2020 Summer Olympics he took the fifth place at the 10 km open water event, with a time of 1:49:29.
