= Marc-Antoine Olivier =

French swimmer (born 1996)

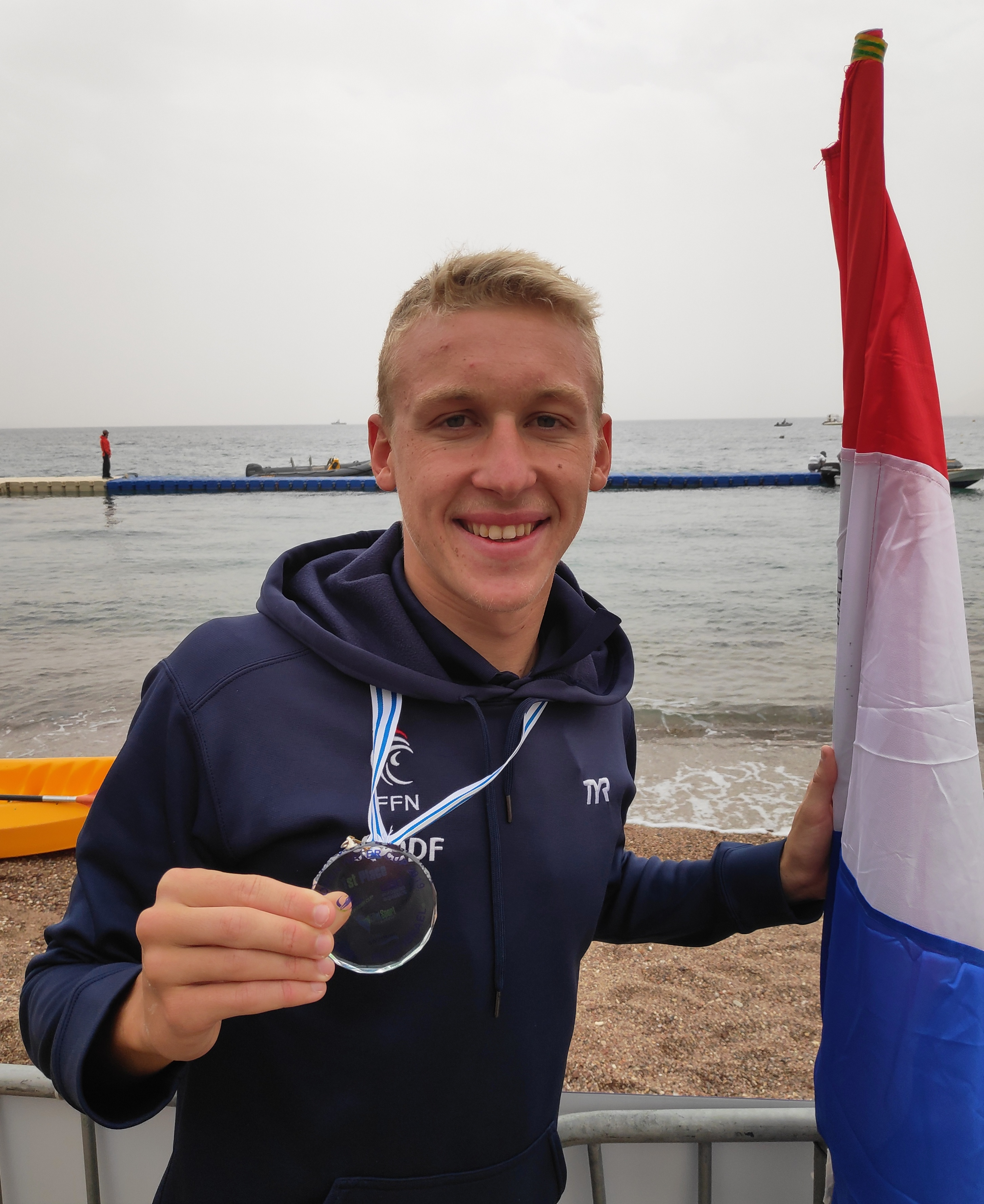
- Marc-Antoine Olivier, Eilat Israel, 31 March 2019

Personal information
- National team: France
- Born: 18 June 1996 (age 30) Denain, France
- Height: 1.83 m (6 ft 0 in)
- Weight: 64 kg (141 lb)

Sport
- Sport: Swimming
- Strokes: Freestyle
- Club: Denain Natation Porte Du Hainaut
Medal record
Men's swimming
Representing France
Olympic Games
Bronze medal – third place	2016 Rio de Janeiro	10 km open water
World Championships
Gold medal – first place	2017 Budapest	5 km open water
Gold medal – first place	2017 Budapest	Team event
Silver medal – second place	2019 Gwangju	10 km open water
Silver medal – second place	2024 Doha	5 km open water
Silver medal – second place	2024 Doha	10 km open water
Bronze medal – third place	2017 Budapest	10 km open water
Bronze medal – third place	2025 Singapore	5 km open water
Bronze medal – third place	2025 Singapore	3 km knockout sprints
European Championships
Silver medal – second place	2020 Budapest	5 km open water
Silver medal – second place	2020 Budapest	10 km open water
Silver medal – second place	2022 Rome	10 km open water
Silver medal – second place	2024 Belgrade	5 km open water
Silver medal – second place	2024 Belgrade	10 km open water
Silver medal – second place	2026 Paris	3 km knockout sprint
Bronze medal – third place	2018 Glasgow	Team open water
Bronze medal – third place	2022 Rome	5 km open water
Bronze medal – third place	2024 Belgrade	Team relay
European Open Water Championships
Bronze medal – third place	2016 Hoorn	10 km open water
Bronze medal – third place	2025 Stari Grad	10 km open water
Military World Games
Silver medal – second place	2019 Wuhan	1500 m freestyle
Bronze medal – third place	2019 Wuhan	800 m freestyle

Marc-Antoine Olivier (born 18 June 1996) is a French competitive swimmer who specialises in long-distance open water events.

== Career ==
Olivier's father and brother were both swimmers, which inspired him to take up the sport as well. He began swimming when he was seven in Denain, France, and he began open-water swimming at the age of fifteen. At the 2015 World Aquatics Championships he finished 6th in the 10 km open water, which qualified him for the Olympic marathon.

He won the bronze medal in the 10 km open water marathon at the 2016 Summer Olympics, outtouching Zu Lijun of China who was recorded in the same time.

He was qualified to represent France at the 2020 Summer Olympics where he finished 6th.
