= Kristóf Rasovszky =

Hungarian swimmer (born 1997)

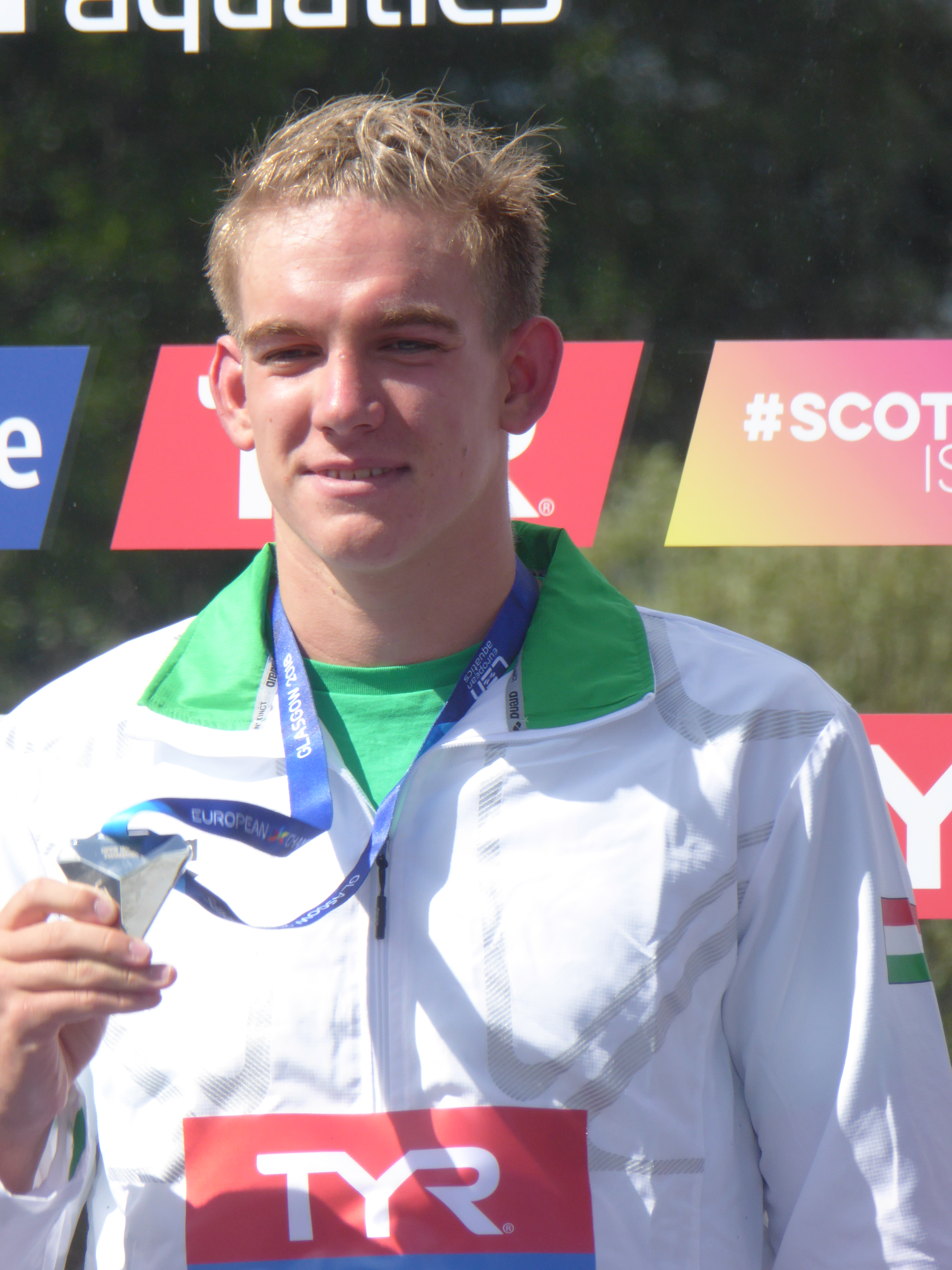
- Rasovszky at the 2018 European Aquatics Championships

Personal information
- Nationality: Hungarian
- Born: 27 March 1997 (age 29) Veszprém, Hungary
- Height: 1.90 m (6 ft 3 in)
- Weight: 84 kg (185 lb)

Sport
- Country: Hungary
- Sport: Open water swimming
- Events: 5 km, 10 km, 25 km
Medal record
Olympic Games
Gold medal – first place	2024 Paris	10 km open water
Silver medal – second place	2020 Tokyo	10 km open water
World Championships
Gold medal – first place	2019 Gwangju	5 km open water
Gold medal – first place	2024 Doha	10 km open water
Silver medal – second place	2022 Budapest	Team relay
Silver medal – second place	2023 Fukuoka	10 km open water
Silver medal – second place	2023 Fukuoka	Team relay
Bronze medal – third place	2024 Doha	Team relay
Bronze medal – third place	2025 Singapore	Team open water
European Championships
Gold medal – first place	2018 Glasgow	5 km open water
Gold medal – first place	2018 Glasgow	25 km open water
Gold medal – first place	2024 Belgrade	Team relay
Gold medal – first place	2025 Stari Grad	3 km open water
Gold medal – first place	2025 Stari Grad	10 km open water
Gold medal – first place	2025 Stari Grad	Team Relay
Silver medal – second place	2018 Glasgow	10 km open water
Silver medal – second place	2022 Rome	Team relay
Bronze medal – third place	2020 Budapest	Team relay
Bronze medal – third place	2025 Stari Grad	5 km open water
Bronze medal – third place	2026 Paris	Team open water

Kristóf Rasovszky (born 27 March 1997) is a Hungarian Olympic swimmer. He represented his country at the 2016, 2020, and 2024 Summer Olympics, winning the silver medal in the 10 kilometre open water swim in 2020 and the gold medal in the 10 kilometre open water swim in 2024.

== Career ==
Rasovszky competed at the 2016 Summer Olympics. He won the 5 kilometre and the 25 kilometre open water swim in the 2018 European Aquatics Championships. He won the 5 kilometre open water swim in the 2019 World Aquatics Championships.

In 2021, he won the bronze medal in the team relay event at the 2020 European Aquatics Championships held in Budapest, Hungary. Later in the year, at the 2020 Summer Olympics, held in 2021 due to the COVID-19 pandemic and contested in Tokyo, Japan, he won a silver medal in the 10 kilometre open water swim with a time of 1:48:59.0.

At the 2022 European Aquatics Championships, held in August in Rome, Italy, Rasovszky helped achieve a finish in 59:53.9 in the open water mixed team relay, anchoring the relay to a silver medal victory only behind the gold medal-winning team from Italy.

Following a fourth-place finish in the 10 kilometre open water swam at the third leg of the 2022 FINA Marathon Swim World Series, held later the same month as the European Championships at Lake Mégantic in Lac-Mégantic, Canada, Rasovszky ranked first based on his results from the first three legs of the World Series circuit. At the fifth and final leg of the World Series, held three months later in Eilat Israel, he placed fourth in the 10 kilometre open water swim with a time of 1:46:45.40 and tied Gregorio Paltrinieri of Italy for the overall highest-scoring male competitor spot.

At the second leg of the 2023 FINA Open Water Tour, held in May in Golfo Aranci, Italy, Rasovszky won the 10 kilometre open water swim with a time of 1:47:17.60, sharing the podium with Domenico Acerenza of Italy (silver medalist) and Oliver Klemet of Germany (bronze medalist). One leg earlier, held also in May only in Egypt, he placed fourth in the same event with a time of 1:52:55.00. Later in the month, on the second day of the tour leg in Setúbal, Portugal, he contributed to a final time of 1:24:13.10 in the 4×1500 metre mixed open water relay to help win the gold medal.
