= Monaco at the 2025 World Aquatics Championships =

- Flag of Monaco
- World Aquatics code: MON
- National federation: Fédération Monégasque de Natation
- Website: montecarlo-swimming.org

in Singapore
- Competitors: 3 in 1 sport
- Medals Ranked 27th: Gold 0 Silver 0 Bronze 1 Total 1

World Aquatics Championships appearances
- 1994; 1998; 2001; 2003; 2005; 2007; 2009; 2011; 2013; 2015; 2017; 2019; 2022; 2023; 2024; 2025

Monaco competed at the 2025 World Aquatics Championships in Singapore from 11 July to 3 August 2025.

== Medalists ==
Medal	Name	Sport	Event	Date
Bronze	Lisa Pou	Open water swimming	Women's 10 km	16 July

Medals by sport
Sport	1st place, gold medalist(s)	2nd place, silver medalist(s)	3rd place, bronze medalist(s)	Total
Open water swimming	0	0	1	1
Total	0	0	1	1

== Competitors ==
The following is the list of competitors in the Championships.

Sport	Men	Women	Total
Open water swimming	2	1	3
Total	2	1	3

== Open water swimming ==
Men

Athlete	Event	Heat		Semifinal		Final	
Athlete	Event	Time	Rank	Time	Rank	Time	Rank
Théo Druenne	3 km knockout sprints	18:16.90	24	Did not advance			
Esteban Faure	3 km knockout sprints	18:23.30	24	Did not advance			
Théo Druenne	5 km	—				1:02:51.90	50
Esteban Faure	5 km	—				1:03:47.10	54
Théo Druenne	10 km	—				DNF	
Esteban Faure	10 km	—				2:16:05.30	50

Women

Athlete	Event	Heat		Semifinal		Final	
Athlete	Event	Time	Rank	Time	Rank	Time	Rank
Lisa Pou	3 km knockout sprints	18:13.20	5 Q	12:11.70	9 Q	6:25.10	7
Lisa Pou	5 km	—				1:02:36.30	6
Lisa Pou	10 km	—				2:07:57.50	3rd place, bronze medalist(s)
