= Monaco at the 2024 World Aquatics Championships =

- Flag of Monaco
- FINA code: MON
- National federation: Fédération Monégasque de Natation
- Website: montecarlo-swimming.org

in Doha, Qatar
- Competitors: 2 in 2 sports
- Medals: Gold 0 Silver 0 Bronze 0 Total 0

World Aquatics Championships appearances
- 1994; 1998; 2001; 2003; 2005; 2007; 2009; 2011; 2013; 2015; 2017; 2019; 2022; 2023; 2024

Monaco competed at the 2024 World Aquatics Championships in Doha, Qatar from 2 to 18 February.

== Competitors ==
The following is the list of competitors in the Championships.

Sport	Men	Women	Total
Open water swimming	1	1*	2*
Swimming	0	1*	1*
Total	1	1*	2*

Lisa Pou competed in both open water swimming and pool swimming.

== Open water swimming ==
Men

Athlete	Event	Time	Rank
Théo Druenne	Men's 5 km	57:08.1	58
Théo Druenne	Men's 10 km	1:54:20.8	52

Women

Athlete	Event	Time	Rank
Lisa Pou	Women's 5 km	57:54.5	11
Lisa Pou	Women's 10 km	1:57:33.4	9

== Swimming ==
Monaco entered 1 swimmers.

Women

Athlete	Event	Heat		Semifinal		Final	
Athlete	Event	Time	Rank	Time	Rank	Time	Rank
Lisa Pou	400 metre freestyle	4:22.61	26	Did not advance			
