= Monaco at the 2017 World Aquatics Championships =

- Flag of Monaco
- FINA code: MON
- National federation: Fédération Monégasque de Natation

in Budapest, Hungary
- Competitors: 2 in 1 sport
- Medals: Gold 0 Silver 0 Bronze 0 Total 0

World Aquatics Championships appearances
- 1994; 1998; 2001; 2003; 2005; 2007; 2009; 2011; 2013; 2015; 2017; 2019; 2022; 2023; 2024

Monaco competed at the 2017 World Aquatics Championships in Budapest, Hungary from 14 July to 30 July.

== Swimming ==
Monaco has received a Universality invitation from FINA to send two swimmers (one man and one woman) to the World Championships.

Athlete	Event	Heat		Semifinal		Final	
Athlete	Event	Time	Rank	Time	Rank	Time	Rank
Theo Chiabaut	Men's 50 m freestyle	25.87	102	did not advance			
Theo Chiabaut	Men's 100 m freestyle	56.63	95	did not advance			
Claudia Verdino	Women's 200 m backstroke	2:29.27	31	did not advance			
Claudia Verdino	Women's 200 m individual medley	2:27.34	33	did not advance			
