= Open water swimming at the 2025 World Aquatics Championships – Women's 3 km knockout sprint =

Women's 3 km knockout sprints at the 2025 World Aquatics Championships
- Venue: Sentosa Island
- Location: Singapore
- Dates: 19 July
- Competitors: 57 from 35 nations
- Winning time: 6:19.9

Medalists
gold medal	Ichika Kajimoto	Japan
silver medal	Ginevra Taddeucci	Italy
bronze medal	Moesha Johnson	Australia
bronze medal	Bettina Fábián	Hungary

The women's 3 km knockout sprints competition at the 2025 World Aquatics Championships was held on 19 July 2025 off the coast of Palawan Beach, Sentosa. It was the first time this event was held at the World Championships.

Ginevra Taddeucci and Kseniia Misharina won the first and second heats, respectively, and then Moesha Johnson won the semifinal race. In the final, Johnson led for the first part of the race, before she was caught up by the rest of the pack on the final straight. Japan's Ichika Kajimoto overtook the leaders to win gold by a body-length lead. Taddeucci of Italy finished second, and then Johnson and Hungary's Bettina Fábián tied to win joint bronze. Kajimoto's win gave Japan its first ever gold medal in open water swimming at a world championship.

== Event description ==
The event featured three rounds of swimming in the open water – the heats, semifinal and final.

The heats consisted of two 1500-metre races, and the top ten finishers of each race qualified for the semifinal. The semifinal consisted of a single 1000-metre race, from which the top ten finishers qualified for the final. The final was a 500-metre sprint which determined the finishing positions. Each round consisted of a single four-corner loop, which was sized according to the distance of the round. (Note: For example, in the second round, the four-corner loop was 1000 m long.) The event took place off the coast of Palawan Beach, Sentosa.

== Background ==
Italy's Ginevra Taddeucci, Australia's Moesha Johnson and Monaco's Lisa Pou were considered the most likely to win the race because of their success in the women's 10 km race a few days earlier. Germany's Isabel Gose and Kseniia Misharina, representing the Neutral Athletes B team, were also considered likely contenders due to their pool speed. Bettina Fábián of Hungary won the event at the 2025 European Championships.

This was the first time this event was held at the World Aquatics Championships. The event was first seen at the 2024 World Junior Open Water Championships. It had also taken place at the 2025 European Open Water Championships and at two of the stops of the 2025 Open Water Swimming World Cup.

== Qualification ==
Each World Aquatics member federation could enter up to two athletes.

== Heats ==
The heats were held on 19 July at 08:00 SGT.

=== Heat 1 ===
Pou led for the start of the race before Gose and Taddeucci took the lead. Taddeucci ended up winning, Japan's Ichika Kajimoto finished second, and Gose finished third. Pou and Johnson were also among those that qualified.

Results
Rank	Swimmer	Nationality	Time	Notes
1	Ginevra Taddeucci	Italy	18:09.7	Q
2	Ichika Kajimoto	Japan	18:09.9	Q
3	Isabel Marie Gose	Germany	18:11.4	Q
4	Moesha Johnson	Australia	18:11.7	Q
5	Lisa Pou	Monaco	18:13.2	Q
6	Tayla Martin	Australia	18:13.6	Q
7	Ana Marcela Cunha	Brazil	18:14.5	Q
8	Viviane Jungblut	Brazil	18:14.7	Q
9	Margarita Ershova	Neutral Athletes B	18:15.1	Q
10	Lea Boy	Germany	18:15.2	Q
11	Julie Pleskotová	Czech Republic	18:16.3	
12	Paula Otero	Spain	18:18.7	
13	Louna Kasvio	Finland	18:18.8	
14	Mariya Fedotova	Kazakhstan	18:21.0	
15	Sharon Guerrero	Mexico	18:25.5	
16	Candela Giordanino	Argentina	18:30.3	
17	Janka Juhász	Hungary	18:56.4	
18	Nip Tsz Yin	Hong Kong	19:02.9	
19	Cheng Hanyu	China	19:14.3	
20	Lin Jia-shien	Chinese Taipei	19:14.6	
21	Hwang Ji-yeon	South Korea	19:19.8	
22	Pilar Cañedo	Uruguay	19:20.8	
23	Selinnur Sade	Turkey	19:23.5	
24	Wang Yi-chen	Chinese Taipei	19:33.1	
25	Diksha Sandip Yadav	India	20:02.0	
26	Reza Westerduin	Namibia	20:29.4	
27	Alondra Quiles	Puerto Rico	20:29.5	
28	Meenakshi Gopakumar Menon	India	20:39.4	
29	Susie Worsfold	Zimbabwe	22:42.9	
	María Fernanda Arellanos	Peru	Did not start	

=== Heat 2 ===
Hungary's Bettina Fábián held the lead until the last corner, when Kseniia Misharina, representing the Neutral Athletes B team, overtook her to win. Fábián finished second. The rest of the qualification spots were decided in a close sprint finish.

Results
Rank	Swimmer	Nationality	Time	Notes
1	Kseniia Misharina	Neutral Athletes B	18:33.3	Q
2	Bettina Fábián	Hungary	18:34.7	Q
3	Clémence Coccordano	France	18:35.5	Q
4	Ángela Martínez	Spain	18:35.6	Q
5	Caroline Jouisse	France	18:35.8	Q
6	Antonietta Cesarano	Italy	18:36.0	Q
7	Mariah Denigan	United States	18:36.4	Q
7	Callan Lotter	South Africa	18:36.4	Q
9	Klaudia Tarasiewicz	Poland	18:36.7	Q
10	Georgia Makri	Greece	18:36.8	Q
11	Tian Muran	China	18:38.9	
12	Alena Benešová	Czech Republic	18:39.2	
12	Brinkleigh Hansen	United States	18:39.2	
14	Špela Perše	Slovenia	18:39.3	
15	Chantal Liew	Singapore	18:42.0	
15	Emma Finlin	Canada	18:42.0	
17	Leonie Tenzer	Finland	18:45.6	
18	Su İnal	Turkey	19:12.2	
19	Nikita Lam	Hong Kong	19:23.4	
20	Citlali Mora	Mexico	19:25.6	
21	Amica de Jager	South Africa	19:26.4	
22	Kate Ona	Singapore	20:01.5	
23	Kim Sue-ah	South Korea	20:07.5	
24	Darya Pushko	Kazakhstan	20:08.7	
25	Madison Bergh	Namibia	20:31.5	
26	Cielo Peralta	Paraguay	20:32.0	
27	Isabella Hernández	Dominican Republic	20:33.3	
28	Sera Mawira	Kenya	26:21.0	
	Victoria Okumu	Kenya	Did not start	

== Semifinal ==
The semifinal was held at 08:30. Gose took the lead at the start, ahead of Taddeucci and Fábián. Taddeucci and Gose maintained their leads and were first and second coming out of the final turn, where Johnson was slowed by contact with other swimmers. Over the final straight, Johnson swam to the front to win, while Kajimoto finished second, Taddeucci finished third, and Gose finished fourth. Fábián and Pou also qualified along with four other swimmers.

Results
Rank	Swimmer	Nationality	Time	Notes
1	Moesha Johnson	Australia	12:09.6	Q
2	Ichika Kajimoto	Japan	12:09.7	Q
3	Ginevra Taddeucci	Italy	12:10.0	Q
3	Isabel Marie Gose	Germany	12:10.0	Q
5	Ángela Martínez	Spain	12:10.5	Q
6	Margarita Ershova	Neutral Athletes B	12:10.9	Q
7	Kseniia Misharina	Neutral Athletes B	12:11.1	Q
8	Bettina Fábián	Hungary	12:11.3	Q
9	Lisa Pou	Monaco	12:11.7	Q
9	Lea Boy	Germany	12:11.7	Q
11	Clémence Coccordano	France	12:13.1	
12	Viviane Jungblut	Brazil	12:16.3	
13	Antonietta Cesarano	Italy	12:18.1	
14	Klaudia Tarasiewicz	Poland	12:18.2	
15	Ana Marcela Cunha	Brazil	12:18.5	
16	Callan Lotter	South Africa	12:21.6	
17	Mariah Denigan	United States	12:21.9	
18	Caroline Jouisse	France	12:23.7	
19	Georgia Makri	Greece	12:23.8	
20	Tayla Martin	Australia	12:28.5	

== Final ==
"We're all just fighting for it, everyone wanted it. But that's this sport; I hope people really enjoyed watching that, because that's what this event is about. It's about the craziness and the intensity of what we actually do – condensing a 10km and a 5km into an absolute all-out sprint."

–Moesha Johnson

The final was held at 08:45. Johnson took an early lead, opening up a gap on the rest of the field. She maintained her lead until the final turn, when Gose pulled alongside her. Fábián caught up to Gose and Johnson to swim alongside them, and then Kajimoto and Pou also caught up, leaving five swimmers abreast on the final straight. Kajimoto, who had lost her swimming cap, broke away from the group to win by a body length with a time of 6:19.9. At the same time, Taddeucci moved up the field to finish second with 6:21.9, and then Johnson and Fábián tied for third with 6:23.1. Gose and fellow German Lea Boy tied for fourth with 6:23.3.

Kajimoto's win gave Japan its first ever gold medal in open water swimming at a world championship. Fábián's bronze was her first individual world championship medal.

Andy Ross from World Aquatics described the race as "chaotic" and wrote that Kajimoto flew "under the radar" to overtake and take advantage of the still water at the front. Dawn wrote that Kajimoto timed her final sprint to "perfection".

Results
Rank	Swimmer	Nationality	Time
1st place, gold medalist(s)	Ichika Kajimoto	Japan	6:19.9
2nd place, silver medalist(s)	Ginevra Taddeucci	Italy	6:21.9
3rd place, bronze medalist(s)	Moesha Johnson	Australia	6:23.1
3rd place, bronze medalist(s)	Bettina Fábián	Hungary	6:23.1
5	Isabel Marie Gose	Germany	6:23.3
5	Lea Boy	Germany	6:23.3
7	Lisa Pou	Monaco	6:25.1
8	Margarita Ershova	Neutral Athletes B	6:26.9
9	Ángela Martínez	Spain	6:28.1
10	Kseniia Misharina	Neutral Athletes B	6:30.3
