= Monaco at the 2019 World Aquatics Championships =

- Flag of Monaco
- FINA code: MON
- National federation: Fédération Monégasque de Natation

in Gwangju, South Korea
- Medals: Gold 0 Silver 0 Bronze 0 Total 0

World Aquatics Championships appearances
- 1994; 1998; 2001; 2003; 2005; 2007; 2009; 2011; 2013; 2015; 2017; 2019; 2022; 2023; 2024

Monaco competed at the 2019 World Aquatics Championships in Gwangju, South Korea from 12 to 28 July.

== Swimming ==
Monaco entered three swimmers.

Men

Athlete	Event	Heat		Semifinal		Final	
Athlete	Event	Time	Rank	Time	Rank	Time	Rank
Theo Chiabaut	50 m freestyle	24.96	93	did not advance			
Theo Chiabaut	100 m freestyle	54.99	95	did not advance			
Emilien Puyo	100 m butterfly	1:01.12	73	did not advance			
Emilien Puyo	200 m butterfly	2:15.13	47	did not advance			

Women

Athlete	Event	Heat		Semifinal		Final	
Athlete	Event	Time	Rank	Time	Rank	Time	Rank
Claudia Verdino	200 m backstroke	2:27.35	40	did not advance			
Claudia Verdino	200 m individual medley	2:30.68	35	did not advance			
