= Monaco at the 2023 World Aquatics Championships =

- Flag of Monaco
- FINA code: MON
- National federation: Fédération Monégasque de Natation
- Website: montecarlo-swimming.org

in Fukuoka, Japan
- Competitors: 1 in 2 sports
- Medals: Gold 0 Silver 0 Bronze 0 Total 0

World Aquatics Championships appearances
- 1994; 1998; 2001; 2003; 2005; 2007; 2009; 2011; 2013; 2015; 2017; 2019; 2022; 2023; 2024

Monaco is set to compete at the 2023 World Aquatics Championships in Fukuoka, Japan from 14 to 30 July.

== Open water swimming ==
Monaco entered 1 open water swimmer.

Athlete	Event	Time	Rank
Theo Druenne	Men's 5 km	1:00:14.6	47
Theo Druenne	Men's 10 km	2:00:46.8	42

== Swimming ==
Monaco entered 1 open water swimmer.

Men

Athlete	Event	Heat		Semifinal		Final	
Athlete	Event	Time	Rank	Time	Rank	Time	Rank
Theo Druenne	400 metre freestyle	4:06.58 NR	43	—		Did not advance	
