= Ecuador at the 2025 World Aquatics Championships =

- Flag of Ecuador
- World Aquatics code: ECU
- National federation: Federación Ecuatoriana de Natación
- Website: fena-ecuador.org

in Singapore
- Competitors: 6 in 2 sports
- Medals: Gold 0 Silver 0 Bronze 0 Total 0

World Aquatics Championships appearances
- 1973; 1975; 1978; 1982; 1986; 1991; 1994; 1998; 2001; 2003; 2005; 2007; 2009; 2011; 2013; 2015; 2017; 2019; 2022; 2023; 2024; 2025

Ecuador is competing at the 2025 World Aquatics Championships in Singapore from 11 July to 3 August 2025.

== Competitors ==
The following is the list of competitors in the Championships.

| Sport | Men | Women | Total |
|---|---|---|---|
| Open water swimming | 2 | 2 | 4 |
| Swimming | 1 | 1 | 2 |
| Total | 3 | 3 | 6 |

== Open water swimming ==
Men

| Athlete | Event | Final | |
| Athlete | Event | Time | Rank |
|---|---|---|---|
| Esteban Enderica Salgado | 5 km | 1:00:56.00 | 23 |
| David Farinango | 5 km | 1:01:09.20 | 32 |
| Esteban Enderica Salgado | 10 km | 2:03:06.10 | 15 |
| David Farinango | 10 km | 2:04:18.10 | 23 |

Women

| Athlete | Event | Final | |
| Athlete | Event | Time | Rank |
|---|---|---|---|
| Ana Abad | 5 km | 1:08:49.90 | 38 |
| Danna Martinez | 5 km | 1:06:35.90 | 33 |
| Ana Abad | 10 km | 2:20:57.80 | 34 |
| Danna Martinez | 10 km | DNF | |

Mixed

| Athlete | Event | Final | |
| Athlete | Event | Time | Rank |
|---|---|---|---|
| Ana Abad; Esteban Enderica Salgado; David Farinango; Danna Martinez | Team | 1:15:30.60 | 13 |

== Swimming ==
Men

| Athlete | Event | Heat | | Semifinal | | Final | |
| Athlete | Event | Time | Rank | Time | Rank | Time | Rank |
|---|---|---|---|---|---|---|---|
| William Birkett Feraud | 50 m freestyle | 23.17 | 56 | Did not advance | | | |
| William Birkett Feraud | 100 m freestyle | 51.02 | 56 | Did not advance | | | |

Women

| Athlete | Event | Heat | | Semifinal | | Final | |
| Athlete | Event | Time | Rank | Time | Rank | Time | Rank |
|---|---|---|---|---|---|---|---|
| Emma Sabando Toro | 50 m butterfly | 27.28 | 39 | Did not advance | | | |
| Emma Sabando Toro | 100 m butterfly | 1:01.60 | 37 | Did not advance | | | |
