= Swimming at the 2025 World Aquatics Championships – Men's 50 metre backstroke =

Men's 50 metre backstroke at the 2025 World Aquatics Championships
- Venue: World Aquatics Championships Arena
- Location: Singapore Sports Hub, Kallang
- Dates: 2 August (heats and semifinals); 3 August (final)
- Competitors: 60 from 50 nations
- Winning time: 23.68

Medalists
gold medal	Kliment Kolesnikov
silver medal	Pieter Coetze	South Africa
silver medal	Pavel Samusenko

The men's 50 metre backstroke event at the 2025 World Aquatics Championships was held from 2 to 3 August 2025 at the World Aquatics Championships Arena at the Singapore Sports Hub in Kallang, Singapore.

== Background ==
Russian Kliment Kolesnikov, representing the Neutral Athletes B team, entered as the favourite with the world record of 23.55 seconds and the fastest qualifying time of 23.90. His compatriot Pavel Samusenko had the second fastest qualifying time of 24.01. Other contenders included Ksawery Masiuk of Poland, who earned bronze at the 2024 World Championships and held a 24.44 national record, and Pieter Coetze of South Africa, ranked 10th globally. European challengers included Hubert Kós of Hungary, Thomas Ceccon of Italy, and Apostolos Christou of Greece. The United States fielded Shaine Casas and Quintin McCarty, and Isaac Cooper of Australia and Xu Jiayu of China were also in contention for medals.

== Qualification ==
Each National Federation was permitted to enter a maximum of two qualified athletes in each individual event, but they could do so only if both of them had attained the "A" standard qualification time. For this event, the "A" standard qualification time was 25.11 seconds. Federations could enter one athlete into the event if they met the "B" standard qualification time. For this event, the "B" standard qualification time was 25.99 seconds. Athletes could also enter the event if they had met an "A" or "B" standard in a different event and their Federation had not entered anyone else. Additional considerations applied to Federations who had few swimmers enter through the standard qualification times. Federations in this category could at least enter two men and two women to the competition, all of whom could enter into up to two events.

Top 10 fastest qualification times
Swimmer	Country	Time	Competition
Kliment Kolesnikov	Neutral Athletes B	23.90	2025 Russian Championships
Pavel Samusenko	Neutral Athletes B	24.01	2025 Russian Championships
Shaine Casas	United States	24.23	Westmont stop of the 2025 TYR Pro Swim Series
Quintin McCarty	United States	24.34	2025 United States Championships
Xu Jiayu	China	24.38	2025 Chinese Championships
Apostolos Christou	Greece	24.39	2024 European Championships
Miron Lifintsev	Neutral Athletes B	24.40	2025 Russian Championships
Michele Lamberti	Italy	24.40	2024 Sette Colli
Oliver Morgan	Great Britain	24.43	2025 British Championships
Ksawery Masiuk	Poland	24.46	2025 Polish Championships

== Records ==
Prior to the competition, the existing world and championship records were as follows.

World record	Kliment Kolesnikov (RUS)	23.55	Kazan, Russia	27 July 2023
Competition record	Liam Tancock (GBR)	24.04	Rome, Italy	2 August 2009

The following new records were set during this competition.

Date	Event	Name	Nationality	Time	Record
3 August	Final	Kliment Kolesnikov	Neutral Athletes B	23.68	CR

== Heats ==
The heats took place on 2 August at 10:31.

Rank	Heat	Lane	Swimmer	Nation	Time	Notes
1	7	4	Kliment Kolesnikov	Neutral Athletes B	24.08	Q
2	5	3	Pieter Coetze	South Africa	24.36	Q
3	5	7	Miroslav Knedla	Czech Republic	24.52	Q, NR
4	7	3	Oliver Morgan	Great Britain	24.56	Q
5	5	6	Hubert Kós	Hungary	24.62	Q, =NR
6	5	5	Apostolos Christou	Greece	24.65	Q
7	6	4	Pavel Samusenko	Neutral Athletes B	24.66	Q
8	6	2	Ulises Saravia	Argentina	24.72	Q
9	5	0	Ádám Jászó	Hungary	24.73	Q
10	7	5	Quintin McCarty	United States	24.76	Q
10	7	7	Adrián Santos	Spain	24.76	Q
10	7	8	Finn Harland	New Zealand	24.76	Q
13	5	1	Vincent Passek	Germany	24.79	Q
14	7	2	Isaac Cooper	Australia	24.80	Q
15	6	3	Ksawery Masiuk	Poland	24.89	Q
15	7	1	Christian Bacico	Italy	24.89	Q
17	7	0	Ralf Tribuntsov	Estonia	24.90	
18	5	2	Mantas Kaušpėdas	Lithuania	24.95	
19	3	8	Shane Ryan	Ireland	24.96	
20	5	4	Shaine Casas	United States	24.97	
20	6	6	Guilherme Basseto	Brazil	24.97	
22	4	3	Marcus Reyes-Gentry	Mexico	24.98	NR
23	6	1	Iván Martínez	Spain	25.03	
24	4	5	Wang Gukailai	China	25.04	
24	6	7	Evangelos Makrygiannis	Greece	25.04	
26	6	5	Xu Jiayu	China	25.08	
27	5	8	Kai van Westering	Netherlands	25.09	
27	6	0	Andrew Jeffcoat	New Zealand	25.09	
29	7	9	Riku Matsuyama	Japan	25.11	
30	4	8	Blake Tierney	Canada	25.20	
31	4	6	Robert Pedersen	Denmark	25.22	
32	3	5	Nikola Aćin	Serbia	25.24	NR
33	4	2	Jakub Krischke	Czech Republic	25.34	
33	4	4	Tomer Shuster	Israel	25.34	
33	5	9	Denis Popescu	Romania	25.34	
36	6	9	Masaki Yura	Japan	25.35	
37	3	6	Quah Zheng Wen	Singapore	25.38	
37	6	8	Jonathon Marshall	Great Britain	25.38	
39	3	7	Lamar Taylor	Bahamas	25.45	
40	4	7	Jack Harvey	Bermuda	25.55	
41	4	1	Oleksandr Zheltyakov	Ukraine	25.64	
42	4	0	Bernhard Reitshammer	Austria	25.70	
43	2	4	Markus Lie	Norway	25.76	
43	3	9	Enkhtöriin Erkhes	Mongolia	25.76	NR
45	3	3	Noe Pantskhava	Georgia	25.82	
46	4	9	Nikola Miljenić	Croatia	25.91	
47	3	1	Remi Fabiani	Luxembourg	26.02	
48	2	5	Gleb Kovalenya	Kazakhstan	26.05	
49	3	0	Patrick Groters	Aruba	26.06	
50	2	3	Tonnam Kanteemool	Thailand	26.10	
51	2	6	Charles Hockin	Paraguay	26.11	
51	3	2	I Gede Siman Sudartawa	Indonesia	26.11	
53	1	3	Ahmad Safie	Lebanon	26.20	
54	2	2	Filippos Iakovidis	Cyprus	26.79	
55	2	7	Samiul Islam Rafi	Bangladesh	27.21	
56	2	8	Luka Smit	Malawi	29.98	
57	2	1	Zakhar Pilkevich	Tajikistan	31.52	
58	2	0	Claudio Yelegou	Cameroon	32.42	
59	2	9	Jose Tati	Cape Verde	34.68	
60	1	5	Beula Sanga	Solomon Islands	36.11	
	1	4	Foday Mansaray	Sierra Leone	Did not start	
	3	4	Roman Mityukov	Switzerland	Did not start	
	7	6	Thomas Ceccon	Italy	Did not start	

== Semifinals ==
The semifinals took place on 2 August at 20:07.

Rank	Heat	Lane	Swimmer	Nation	Time	Notes
1	2	4	Kliment Kolesnikov	Neutral Athletes B	24.16	Q
2	2	6	Pavel Samusenko	Neutral Athletes B	24.31	Q
3	1	4	Pieter Coetze	South Africa	24.32	Q, AF
4	2	8	Ksawery Masiuk	Poland	24.41	Q, NR
5	1	3	Apostolos Christou	Greece	24.50	Q
5	2	3	Hubert Kós	Hungary	24.50	Q, NR
7	1	2	Quintin McCarty	United States	24.52	Q
8	1	1	Isaac Cooper	Australia	24.53	Q
9	2	5	Miroslav Knedla	Czech Republic	24.61	
10	1	5	Oliver Morgan	Great Britain	24.64	
11	1	6	Ulises Saravia	Argentina	24.68	
12	2	2	Ádám Jászó	Hungary	24.74	
13	2	7	Adrián Santos	Spain	24.80	
14	2	1	Vincent Passek	Germany	24.82	
15	1	8	Christian Bacico	Italy	24.90	
16	1	7	Finn Harland	New Zealand	25.02	

== Final ==
The final took place on 3 August at 19:02.

Rank	Lane	Name	Nationality	Time	Notes
1st place, gold medalist(s)	4	Kliment Kolesnikov	Neutral Athletes B	23.68	CR
2nd place, silver medalist(s)	3	Pieter Coetze	South Africa	24.17	AF
2nd place, silver medalist(s)	5	Pavel Samusenko	Neutral Athletes B	24.17	
4	6	Ksawery Masiuk	Poland	24.51	
5	1	Quintin McCarty	United States	24.58	
6	2	Apostolos Christou	Greece	24.59	
7	8	Isaac Cooper	Australia	24.61	
8	7	Hubert Kós	Hungary	24.62	
