= Finland at the 2025 World Aquatics Championships =

- Flag of Finland
- World Aquatics code: FIN
- National federation: Finnish Swimming Federation
- Website: uimaliitto.fi (in Finnish)

in Singapore
- Competitors: 5 in 2 sports
- Medals: Gold 0 Silver 0 Bronze 0 Total 0

World Aquatics Championships appearances
- 1973; 1975; 1978; 1982; 1986; 1991; 1994; 1998; 2001; 2003; 2005; 2007; 2009; 2011; 2013; 2015; 2017; 2019; 2022; 2023; 2024; 2025

Finland is competing at the 2025 World Aquatics Championships in Singapore from 11 July to 3 August 2025.

== Competitors ==
The following is the list of competitors in the Championships.

Sport	Men	Women	Total
Open water swimming	0	2	2
Swimming	1	2	3
Total	1	4	5

== Open water swimming ==
Women

Athlete	Event	Heat		Semifinal		Final	
Athlete	Event	Time	Rank	Time	Rank	Time	Rank
Louna Kasvio	3 km knockout sprints	18:18.80	13	Did not advance			
Leonie-Sarah Josephine Tenzer	3 km knockout sprints	18:45.60	17	Did not advance			
Louna Kasvio	5 km	—				1:06:25.30	26
Leonie-Sarah Josephine Tenzer	5 km	—				1:08:36.20	37
Louna Kasvio	10 km	—				2:15:09.80	19
Leonie-Sarah Josephine Tenzer	10 km	—				2:21:08.40	38

== Swimming ==
Men

Athlete	Event	Heat		Semifinal		Final	
Athlete	Event	Time	Rank	Time	Rank	Time	Rank
Tomas Koski	100 m freestyle	49.67	39	Did not advance			
Tomas Koski	200 m freestyle	1:47.34	20	Did not advance			

Women

Athlete	Event	Heat		Semifinal		Final	
Athlete	Event	Time	Rank	Time	Rank	Time	Rank
Fanny Teijonsalo	50 m backstroke	27.85	11 Q	28.00	16	Did not advance	
Fanny Teijonsalo	100 m backstroke	1:01.85	28	Did not advance			
Veera Kivirinta	50 m breaststroke	30.36	6 Q	30.37	8 Q	30.68	8
Veera Kivirinta	100 m breaststroke	1:08.33	30	Did not advance			
