= South Africa at the 2025 World Aquatics Championships =

- Flag of South Africa
- World Aquatics code: RSA
- National federation: Swimming South Africa
- Website: swimsa.org

in Singapore
- Competitors: 59 in 5 sports
- Medals Ranked 16th: Gold 1 Silver 2 Bronze 1 Total 4

World Aquatics Championships appearances
- 1973; 1975; 1978; 1982; 1986; 1991; 1994; 1998; 2001; 2003; 2005; 2007; 2009; 2011; 2013; 2015; 2017; 2019; 2022; 2023; 2024; 2025

South Africa competed at the 2025 World Aquatics Championships in Singapore from July 11 to August 3, 2025.

== Medalists ==
Medal	Name	Sport	Event	Date
1st place, gold medalist(s)	Pieter Coetze	Swimming	Men's 100 metre backstroke	29 July 2025
2nd place, silver medalist(s)	Pieter Coetze	Swimming	Men's 200 metre backstroke	1 August 2025
2nd place, silver medalist(s)	Pieter Coetze	Swimming	Men's 50 metre backstroke	3 August 2025
3rd place, bronze medalist(s)	Kaylene Corbett	Swimming	Women's 200 metre breaststroke	1 August 2025

== Competitors ==
The following is the list of competitors in the Championships.

Sport	Men	Women	Total
Artistic swimming	0	10	10
Diving	0	3	3
Open water swimming	4*	3*	7*
Swimming	4*	9*	13*
Water polo	14	14	28
Total	21*	38*	59*

- Matthew Caldwell and Catherine Van Rensburg competed in both open water swimming and pool swimming.

== Artistic swimming ==
Women

Athlete	Event	Preliminaries		Final	
Athlete	Event	Points	Rank	Points	Rank
Xera Vegter Maharajh	Solo technical routine	175.5766	33	Did not advance	
Xera Vegter Maharajh	Solo free routine	134.0263	25	Did not advance	
Aurelia Pretorius; Rebecca Schenk	Duet technical routine	150.4983	39	Did not advance	

Mixed

Athlete	Event	Preliminaries		Final	
Athlete	Event	Points	Rank	Points	Rank
Tori Buitendag; Chloe Dundas-Starr; Leah Howell; Aneesah Lindoor; Aurelia Pretorius; Tayla-Jade van Huyssteen; Casey Williams; Sarah Williams	Team technical routine	139.1717	25	Did not advance	
Tori Buitendag; Chloe Dundas-Starr; Leah Howell; Aneesah Lindoor; Aurelia Pretorius; Tayla-Jade van Huyssteen; Casey Williams; Sarah Williams	Team free routine	101.5804	20	Did not advance	

== Diving ==
Women

Athlete	Event	Preliminaries		Semifinals		Final	
Athlete	Event	Points	Rank	Points	Rank	Points	Rank
Grace Brammer	1 m springboard	197.70	39	—		Did not advance	
Bailey Heydra	1 m springboard	214.60	32	—		Did not advance	
Bailey Heydra	3 m springboard	242.40	29	Did not advance			
Zalika Methula	3 m springboard	153.00	50	Did not advance			
Bailey Heydra; Zalika Methula	3 m synchro springboard	214.17	14	—		Did not advance	

== Open water swimming ==
Men

Athlete	Event	Heat		Semi-final		Final	
Athlete	Event	Time	Rank	Time	Rank	Time	Rank
Ruan Breytenbach	Men's 10 km	—				2:05:07.6	24
Connor Buck	Men's 3 km knockout sprints	17:54.1	20	Did not advance			
Connor Buck	Men's 5 km	—				1:01:26.3	38
Connor Buck	Men's 10 km	—				2:09:37.1	36
Matthew Caldwell	Men's 3 km knockout sprints	17:45.4	14	Did not advance			
Matthew Caldwell	Men's 5 km	—				1:01:23.8	35

Women

Athlete	Event	Heat		Semi-final		Final	
Athlete	Event	Time	Rank	Time	Rank	Time	Rank
Amica de Jager	Women's 3 km knockout sprints	19:26.4	21	Did not advance			
Callan Lotter	Women's 3 km knockout sprints	18:36.4	8 Q	12:21.6	16	Did not advance	
Callan Lotter	Women's 5 km	—				1:04:21.6	16
Callan Lotter	Women's 10 km	—				2:14:01.3	16
Catherine Van Rensburg	Women's 5 km	—				1:06:50.4	35
Catherine Van Rensburg	Women's 10 km	—				2:19:40.2	25

Mixed

Athlete	Event	Final	
Athlete	Event	Time	Rank
Matthew Caldwell; Amica de Jager; Kellen Jones; Catherine Van Rensburg	Team relay	1:15:25.2	12

== Swimming ==
South Africa entered 13 swimmers.

Men

Athlete	Event	Heat		Semi-final		Final	
Athlete	Event	Time	Rank	Time	Rank	Time	Rank
Matthew Caldwell	400 m freestyle	4:01.45	39	—		Did not advance	
Pieter Coetze	50 m backstroke	24.36	2 Q	24.32 AF	3 Q	24.17	2nd place, silver medalist(s)
Pieter Coetze	100 m backstroke	52.80	7 Q	52.29 AF	3 Q	51.85 AF	1st place, gold medalist(s)
Pieter Coetze	200 m backstroke	1:57.11	16 Q	1:54.22 AF	1 Q	1:53.36 AF	2nd place, silver medalist(s)
Matthew Sates	200 m freestyle	1:48.45	32	Did not advance			
Matthew Sates	200 m individual medley	2:01.80	28	Did not advance			
Matthew Sates	400 m individual medley	Did not start		—		Did not advance	
Chris Smith	50 m breaststroke	26.82	6 Q	26.77	5 Q	26.75	6
Chris Smith	100 m breaststroke	1:00.85	25	Did not advance			

Women

Athlete	Event	Heat		Semi-final		Final	
Athlete	Event	Time	Rank	Time	Rank	Time	Rank
Aimee Canny	200 m freestyle	1:57.53	8 Q	1:57.72	12	Did not advance	
Aimee Canny	200 m individual medley	2:12.70	19	Did not advance			
Kaylene Corbett	50 m breaststroke	31.43	27	Did not advance			
Kaylene Corbett	200 m breaststroke	2:25.10	7 Q	2:23.81	7 Q	2:23.52	3rd place, bronze medalist(s)
Caitlin de Lange	50 m freestyle	24.95	18	Did not advance			
Erin Gallagher	100 m freestyle	55.01	27	Did not advance			
Erin Gallagher	50 m butterfly	25.77	12 Q	25.39 NR	3 Q	25.66	8
Erin Gallagher	100 m butterfly	57.48	9 Q	57.68	13	Did not advance	
Rebecca Meder	100 m breaststroke	1:07.50	27	Did not advance			
Rebecca Meder	200 m breaststroke	2:28.40	24	Did not advance			
Rebecca Meder	200 m individual medley	2:11.68	13 Q	2:11.05	10	Did not advance	
Olivia Nel	50 m backstroke	28.23	23	Did not advance			
Hannah Robertson	400 m freestyle	4:22.69	27	—		Did not advance	
Catherine van Rensburg	800 m freestyle	8:50.60	25	—		Did not advance	
Catherine van Rensburg	1500 m freestyle	16:59.73	26	—		Did not advance	
Olivia Nel; Caitlin de Lange; Georgia Nel; Hannah Robertson	4 × 100 m freestyle relay	3:45.33	12	—		Did not advance	
Aimee Canny; Georgia Nel; Hannah Robertson; Catherine van Rensburg	4 × 200 m freestyle relay	8:13.06	10	—		Did not advance	
Olivia Nel; Rebecca Meder; Erin Gallagher; Aimee Canny	4 × 100 m medley relay	3:59.47 AF	9	—		Did not advance	

Mixed

Athlete	Event	Heat		Final	
Athlete	Event	Time	Rank	Time	Rank
Matthew Sates; Matthew Caldwell; Olivia Nel; Aimee Canny	4 × 100 m freestyle relay	3:31.65	19	Did not advance	
Pieter Coetze; Kaylene Corbett; Erin Gallagher; Matthew Caldwell	4 × 100 m medley relay	3:52.03	18	Did not advance	

== Water polo ==
Summary

Team	Event	Group stage				Playoff	Quarterfinal	Semi-final	Final / BM	
Team	Event	Opposition Score	Opposition Score	Opposition Score	Rank	Opposition Score	Opposition Score	Opposition Score	Opposition Score	Rank
South Africa	Men's tournament	Serbia; L 3–27	Romania; L 5–24	Italy; L 4–28	4	—	—	Australia; L 4–2	Singapore; L 13–14	16
South Africa	Women's tournament	Spain; L 4–23	Great Britain; L 3–12	France; L 6–13	4	—	—	Croatia; L 6–16	Singapore; W 8–4	15

=== Men's tournament ===
Team roster

The following is the South African roster.

Head coach: Grant MacKenzie

- 1 Luka Rajak GK
- 2 Nathan Ward FP
- 3 Manqoba Bungane FP
- 4 Dean Sneddon FP
- 5 Calvin Kuperus FP
- 6 Carl Germishuys FP
- 7 Dylan Watt FP
- 8 Ryan Sneddon FP
- 9 Matthew Bowers FP
- 10 Kelly Geldenhuys FP
- 11 Matthew Neser FP
- 12 Tristan Grimmett FP
- 13 Matthew Smith GK
- 14 Brett Sneddon FP

Group play

Pos	Team	Pld	W	PSW	PSL	L	GF	GA	GD	Pts	Qualification
1	Italy	3	2	1	0	0	58	22	+36	8	Quarterfinals
2	Serbia	3	2	0	1	0	59	25	+34	7	Playoffs
3	Romania	3	1	0	0	2	38	41	−3	3	Playoffs
4	South Africa	3	0	0	0	3	12	79	−67	0	13–16th place semifinals

Source: Omegatiming
Rules for classification: 1) points; 2) head-to-head points; 3) head-to-head goal difference; 4) head-to-head number of goals scored; 5) Goal difference.

12 July 2025; 09:00	Report	Serbia	27–3	South Africa	OCBC Aquatic Centre, Singapore; Referees: Yasser Mehalhel (EGY), Stanko Ivanovski (MNE)
12 July 2025; 09:00	Report	Score by quarters: 8–0, 6–3, 4–0, 9–0			OCBC Aquatic Centre, Singapore; Referees: Yasser Mehalhel (EGY), Stanko Ivanovski (MNE)
12 July 2025; 09:00	Report	Mandić 6	Goals	three players 1	OCBC Aquatic Centre, Singapore; Referees: Yasser Mehalhel (EGY), Stanko Ivanovski (MNE)

14 July 2025; 10:35	Report	South Africa	5–24	Romania	OCBC Aquatic Centre, Singapore; Referees: Evan Andrews (CAN), Andrej Franulović (CRO)
14 July 2025; 10:35	Report	Score by quarters: 0–8, 1–3, 3–7, 1–6			OCBC Aquatic Centre, Singapore; Referees: Evan Andrews (CAN), Andrej Franulović (CRO)
14 July 2025; 10:35	Report	D. Sneddon 2	Goals	Georgescu, Iudean 4	OCBC Aquatic Centre, Singapore; Referees: Evan Andrews (CAN), Andrej Franulović (CRO)

16 July 2025; 13:45	Report	Italy	28–4	South Africa	OCBC Aquatic Centre, Singapore; Referees: Georgios Stavridis (GRE), Evan Andrews (CAN)
16 July 2025; 13:45	Report	Score by quarters: 6–1, 9–0, 8–1, 5–2			OCBC Aquatic Centre, Singapore; Referees: Georgios Stavridis (GRE), Evan Andrews (CAN)
16 July 2025; 13:45	Report	Cassia, Ferrero 4	Goals	four players 1	OCBC Aquatic Centre, Singapore; Referees: Georgios Stavridis (GRE), Evan Andrews (CAN)

13th–16th place semifinals

18 July 2025; 09:00	Report	South Africa	4–27	Australia	OCBC Aquatic Centre, Singapore; Referees: Yasser Mehalhel (EGY), Chisato Kurosaki (JPN)
18 July 2025; 09:00	Report	Score by quarters: 1–5, 1–10, 2–9, 0–3			OCBC Aquatic Centre, Singapore; Referees: Yasser Mehalhel (EGY), Chisato Kurosaki (JPN)
18 July 2025; 09:00	Report	four players 1	Goals	three players 4	OCBC Aquatic Centre, Singapore; Referees: Yasser Mehalhel (EGY), Chisato Kurosaki (JPN)

15th place game

20 July 2025; 09:00	Report	South Africa	13–14	Singapore	OCBC Aquatic Centre, Singapore; Referees: Maxim Gerasimov (GBR), Mihai Balanescu (ROU)
20 July 2025; 09:00	Report	Score by quarters: 2–7, 4–3, 3–3, 4–1			OCBC Aquatic Centre, Singapore; Referees: Maxim Gerasimov (GBR), Mihai Balanescu (ROU)
20 July 2025; 09:00	Report	Sneddon 3	Goals	Goh 3	OCBC Aquatic Centre, Singapore; Referees: Maxim Gerasimov (GBR), Mihai Balanescu (ROU)

=== Women's tournament ===
Team roster

The following is the South African roster.

Head coach: Dean Whyte

- 1 Lucy Davis GK
- 2 Tumi Macdonell FP
- 3 Tia Caswell FP
- 4 Boati Motau FP
- 5 Skye Murray FP
- 6 Mia Loizides FP
- 7 Shakira January FP
- 8 Esihle Zondo FP
- 9 Hannah Weppelman FP
- 10 Jo Williams FP
- 11 Chloe Meecham FP
- 12 Hannah Banks FP
- 13 Kyla Moolman GK
- 14 Georgia Eccles FP

Group play

Pos	Team	Pld	W	PSW	PSL	L	GF	GA	GD	Pts	Qualification
1	Spain	3	3	0	0	0	62	17	+45	9	Quarterfinals
2	Great Britain	3	2	0	0	1	31	28	+3	6	Playoffs
3	France	3	1	0	0	2	28	41	−13	3	Playoffs
4	South Africa	3	0	0	0	3	13	48	−35	0	13–16th place semifinals

Source: Omegatiming
Rules for classification: 1) points; 2) head-to-head points; 3) head-to-head goal difference; 4) head-to-head number of goals scored; 5) Goal difference.

11 July 2025; 09:00	Report	South Africa	4–23	Spain	OCBC Aquatic Centre, Singapore; Referees: Wu Zhekang (SGP), Michiel Zwart (NED)
11 July 2025; 09:00	Report	Score by quarters: 1–9, 0–5, 2–4, 1–5			OCBC Aquatic Centre, Singapore; Referees: Wu Zhekang (SGP), Michiel Zwart (NED)
11 July 2025; 09:00	Report	four players 1	Goals	González 5	OCBC Aquatic Centre, Singapore; Referees: Wu Zhekang (SGP), Michiel Zwart (NED)

13 July 2025; 12:10	Report	Great Britain	12–3	South Africa	OCBC Aquatic Centre, Singapore; Referees: Zhang Liang (CHN), Wu Zhekang (SGP)
13 July 2025; 12:10	Report	Score by quarters: 5–0, 2–2, 4–1, 1–0			OCBC Aquatic Centre, Singapore; Referees: Zhang Liang (CHN), Wu Zhekang (SGP)
13 July 2025; 12:10	Report	Turner 4	Goals	three players 1	OCBC Aquatic Centre, Singapore; Referees: Zhang Liang (CHN), Wu Zhekang (SGP)

15 July 2025; 12:10	Report	South Africa	6–13	France	OCBC Aquatic Centre, Singapore; Referees: Megan Perry (NZL), Mihai Balanescu (ROU)
15 July 2025; 12:10	Report	Score by quarters: 1–4, 2–3, 3–3, 0–3			OCBC Aquatic Centre, Singapore; Referees: Megan Perry (NZL), Mihai Balanescu (ROU)
15 July 2025; 12:10	Report	Banks 2	Goals	Hardy, Heurtaux 3	OCBC Aquatic Centre, Singapore; Referees: Megan Perry (NZL), Mihai Balanescu (ROU)

13–16th place semifinals

17 July 2025; 10:35	Report	Croatia	16–6	South Africa	OCBC Aquatic Centre, Singapore; Referees: Alessia Ferrari (ITA), Maxim Gerasimov (GBR)
17 July 2025; 10:35	Report	Score by quarters: 7–2, 2–3, 2–0, 5–1			OCBC Aquatic Centre, Singapore; Referees: Alessia Ferrari (ITA), Maxim Gerasimov (GBR)
17 July 2025; 10:35	Report	Janković 4	Goals	Meecham 2	OCBC Aquatic Centre, Singapore; Referees: Alessia Ferrari (ITA), Maxim Gerasimov (GBR)

15th place game

19 July 2025; 09:00	Report	Singapore	4–8	South Africa	OCBC Aquatic Centre, Singapore; Referees: Aurély Blanchard (FRA), Andrej Franulović (CRO)
19 July 2025; 09:00	Report	Score by quarters: 0–3, 3–2, 1–2, 0–1			OCBC Aquatic Centre, Singapore; Referees: Aurély Blanchard (FRA), Andrej Franulović (CRO)
19 July 2025; 09:00	Report	four players 1	Goals	Williams 2	OCBC Aquatic Centre, Singapore; Referees: Aurély Blanchard (FRA), Andrej Franulović (CRO)
