= Italy at the 2025 World Aquatics Championships =

- Flag of Italy
- World Aquatics code: ITA
- National federation: Italian Swimming Federation
- Website: federnuoto.it (in Italian)

in Singapore
- Competitors: 97 in 6 sports
- Medals Ranked 9th: Gold 2 Silver 11 Bronze 6 Total 19

World Aquatics Championships appearances (overview)
- 1973; 1975; 1978; 1982; 1986; 1991; 1994; 1998; 2001; 2003; 2005; 2007; 2009; 2011; 2013; 2015; 2017; 2019; 2022; 2023; 2024; 2025

Italy competed at the 2025 World Aquatics Championships in Singapore from July 11 to August 3, 2025.

== Medalists ==
Medal	Name	Sport	Event	Date
1st place, gold medalist(s)	Chiara Pellacani; Matteo Santoro	Diving	Mixed synchronized 3 metre springboard	30 July 2025
1st place, gold medalist(s)	Simone Cerasuolo	Swimming	Men's 50 metre breaststroke	30 July 2025
2nd place, silver medalist(s)	Gregorio Paltrinieri	Open water	Men's 10 km	16 July 2025
2nd place, silver medalist(s)	Ginevra Taddeucci	Open water	Women's 10 km	16 July 2025
2nd place, silver medalist(s)	Gregorio Paltrinieri	Open water	Men's 5 km	18 July 2025
2nd place, silver medalist(s)	Ginevra Taddeucci	Open water	Women's 5 km	18 July 2025
2nd place, silver medalist(s)	Ginevra Taddeucci	Open water	Women's 3 km knockout sprints	19 July 2025
2nd place, silver medalist(s)	Barbara Pozzobon; Ginevra Taddeucci; Marcello Guidi; Gregorio Paltrinieri	Open water	Team	20 July 2025
2nd place, silver medalist(s)	Enrica Piccoli; Lucrezia Ruggiero	Artistic swimming	Women's duet free routine	24 July 2025
2nd place, silver medalist(s)	Carlos D'Ambrosio; Thomas Ceccon; Lorenzo Zazzeri; Manuel Frigo; Leonardo Deplano	Swimming	Men's 4 × 100 metre freestyle relay	27 July 2025
2nd place, silver medalist(s)	Nicolò Martinenghi	Swimming	Men's 100 metre breaststroke	28 July 2025
2nd place, silver medalist(s)	Simona Quadarella	Swimming	Women's 1500 metre freestyle	29 July 2025
2nd place, silver medalist(s)	Thomas Ceccon	Swimming	Men's 100 metre backstroke	29 July 2025
3rd place, bronze medalist(s)	Filippo Pelati	Artistic swimming	Men's solo free routine	21 July 2025
3rd place, bronze medalist(s)	Filippo Pelati; Lucrezia Ruggiero	Artistic swimming	Mixed duet technical routine	23 July 2025
3rd place, bronze medalist(s)	Chiara Pellacani	Diving	Women's 1 metre springboard	26 July 2025
3rd place, bronze medalist(s)	Thomas Ceccon	Swimming	Men's 50 metre butterfly	28 July 2025
3rd place, bronze medalist(s)	Chiara Pellacani	Diving	Women's 3 metre springboard	2 August 2025
3rd place, bronze medalist(s)	Benedetta Pilato	Swimming	Women's 50 metre breaststroke	3 August 2025

== Competitors ==
The following is the list of competitors in the Championships.

Sport	Men	Women	Total
Artistic swimming	1	12	13
Diving	5	4	9
High diving	2	1	3
Open water swimming	4	4	8
Swimming	17	17	33
Water polo	15	15	30
Total	44	53	97

== Artistic swimming ==
Men

Athlete	Event	Preliminaries		Final	
Athlete	Event	Points	Rank	Points	Rank
Filippo Pelati	Solo technical routine	—N/a		228.0800	6
Filippo Pelati	Solo free routine	—N/a		213.9850	3rd place, bronze medalist(s)

Women

Athlete	Event	Preliminaries		Final	
Athlete	Event	Points	Rank	Points	Rank
Enrica Piccoli	Solo technical routine	237.0000	8 Q	240.2850	7
Enrica Piccoli	Solo free routine	225.7726	6 Q	232.6551	6
Enrica Piccoli; Lucrezia Ruggiero	Duet technical routine	279.0533	7 Q	285.0441	6
Enrica Piccoli; Lucrezia Ruggiero	Duet free routine	266.9571	3 Q	278.7137	2nd place, silver medalist(s)

Mixed

Athlete	Event	Preliminaries		Final	
Athlete	Event	Points	Rank	Points	Rank
Filippo Pelati; Lucrezia Ruggiero	Duet technical routine	—N/a		228.0275	3rd place, bronze medalist(s)
Filippo Pelati; Lucrezia Ruggiero	Duet free routine	—N/a		315.9598	4
Valentina Bisi; Beatrice Esegio; Marta Iacoacci; Alessia Macchi; Sofia Mastroianni; Susanna Pedotti; Sophie Tabbiani; Giulia Vernice	Team technical routine	278.0758	4 Q	282.3191	5
Valentina Bisi; Beatrice Esegio; Marta Iacoacci; Alessia Macchi; Sofia Mastroianni; Susanna Pedotti; Sophie Tabbiani; Giulia Vernice	Team free routine	304.5067	6 Q	313.4337	5
Beatrice Andina; Marta Iacoacci; Alessia Macchi; Giorgia Lucia Macino; Sofia Mastroianni; Susanna Pedotti; Sophie Tabbiani; Giulia Vernice	Team acrobatic routine	215.7280	3	217.5667	4

== Diving ==
Men

Athlete	Event	Preliminaries		Semi-finals		Final	
Athlete	Event	Points	Rank	Points	Rank	Points	Rank
Lorenzo Marsaglia	1 m springboard	381.30	3 Q	—N/a		383.70	7
Giovanni Tocci	1 m springboard	365.15	7 Q	—N/a		340.25	11
Matteo Santoro	3 m springboard	361.65	24	Did not advance			
Giovanni Tocci	3 m springboard	374.00	19	Did not advance			
Lorenzo Marsaglia; Giovanni Tocci	3 m synchronized springboard	371.58	8 Q	—N/a		375.60	5
Simone Conte	10 m platform	359.95	25	Did not advance			
Riccardo Giovannini	10 m platform	383.80	17 Q	409.15	14	Did not advance	
Simone Conte; Riccardo Giovannini	10 m synchronized platform	337.98	12	—N/a		Did not advance	

Women

Athlete	Event	Preliminaries		Semi-finals		Final	
Athlete	Event	Points	Rank	Points	Rank	Points	Rank
Elena Bertocchi	1 m springboard	228.60	20	—N/a		Did not advance	
Chiara Pellacani	1 m springboard	251.10	8 Q	—N/a		270.80	3rd place, bronze medalist(s)
Chiara Pellacani	3 m springboard	302.05	6 Q	310.80	4 Q	323.20	3rd place, bronze medalist(s)
Elisa Pizzini	3 m springboard	277.70	15 Q	283.80	9 Q	280.80	10
Chiara Pellacani; Elisa Pizzini	3 m synchronized springboard	262.56	5 Q	—N/a		279.27	5
Sarah Jodoin di Maria	10 m platform	267.85	18 Q	292.30	11 Q	317.90	9

Mixed

Athlete	Event	Final	
Athlete	Event	Points	Rank
Chiara Pellacani; Matteo Santoro	3 m synchronized springboard	308.13	1st place, gold medalist(s)
Riccardo Giovannini; Sarah Jodoin di Maria	10 m synchronized platform	280.14	7
Riccardo Giovannini; Sarah Jodoin di Maria; Chiara Pellacani; Matteo Santoro	Team	386.85	6

== High diving ==
Italy entered 3 high divers.

Athlete	Event	Points	Rank
Davide Baraldi	Men's high diving	323.80	12
Andrea Barnaba	Men's high diving	375.30	=6
Elisa Cosetti	Women's high diving	277.60	8

== Open water swimming ==
Men

Gregorio Paltrinieri was expected to contend for a medal.

Athlete	Event	Heats		Semifinal		Final	
Athlete	Event	Time	Rank	Time	Rank	Time	Rank
Matteo Diodato	Men's 3 km knockout sprints	17:00.9	1 Q	11:34.7	16	Did not advance	
Andrea Filadelli	Men's 10 km	—N/a				2:00:43.7	7
Marcello Guidi	Men's 5 km	—N/a				57:32.3	4
Gregorio Paltrinieri	Men's 3 km knockout sprints	17:03.9	3 Q	11:30.4	5 Q	5:58.9	4
Gregorio Paltrinieri	Men's 5 km	—N/a				57:29.3	2nd place, silver medalist(s)
Gregorio Paltrinieri	Men's 10 km	—N/a				1:59:59.2	2nd place, silver medalist(s)

Women

Athlete	Event	Heats		Semifinal		Final	
Athlete	Event	Time	Rank	Time	Rank	Time	Rank
Antonietta Cesarano	Women's 3 km knockout sprints	18:36.0	6 Q	12:18.1	13	Did not advance	
Giulia Gabbrielleschi	Women's 5 km	—N/a				1:03:40.0	10
Barbara Pozzobon	Women's 10 km	—N/a				2:09:30.3	10
Ginevra Taddeucci	Women's 3 km knockout sprints	18:09.7	1 Q	12:10.0	3 Q	6:21.9	2nd place, silver medalist(s)
Ginevra Taddeucci	Women's 5 km	—N/a				1:02:02.3	2nd place, silver medalist(s)
Ginevra Taddeucci	Women's 10 km	—N/a				2:07:55.7	2nd place, silver medalist(s)

Mixed

Athlete	Event	Time	Rank
Barbara Pozzobon; Ginevra Taddeucci; Marcello Guidi; Gregorio Paltrinieri	Team relay	1:09:15.4	2nd place, silver medalist(s)

== Swimming ==
Italy entered 33 swimmers, including experienced swimmers such as Thomas Ceccon, Nicolò Martinenghi and Simona Quadarella and younger swimmers such as Carlos D’Ambrosio, Sara Curtis, and 17-year-old Bianca Nannucci.

Men

Athlete	Event	Heat		Semi-final		Final	
Athlete	Event	Time	Rank	Time	Rank	Time	Rank
Christian Bacico	50 m backstroke	24.89	15 Q	24.90	15	Did not advance	
Christian Bacico	100 m backstroke	52.72	5 Q	52.72	10	Did not advance	
Christian Bacico	200 m backstroke	1:56.79	11 Q	1:56.02	10	Did not advance	
Francesco Burdisso	100 m butterfly	51.59	17	Did not advance			
Francesco Burdisso	200 m butterfly	1:56.08	13 Q	1:54.87	7 Q	1:55.27	8
Thomas Ceccon	50 m backstroke	Did not start		Did not advance			
Thomas Ceccon	100 m backstroke	53.65	13 Q	52.35	4 Q	51.90	2nd place, silver medalist(s)
Thomas Ceccon	200 m backstroke	1:57.15	17	Did not advance			
Thomas Ceccon	50 m butterfly	23.06	8 Q	22.84	6 Q	22.67 NR	3rd place, bronze medalist(s)
Thomas Ceccon	100 m butterfly	51.36	11 Q	50.42 NR	5 Q	51.12	8
Simone Cerasuolo	50 m breaststroke	26.42	1 Q	26.64	2 Q	26.54	1st place, gold medalist(s)
Carlos D'Ambrosio	100 m freestyle	48.67	26	Did not advance			
Carlos D'Ambrosio	200 m freestyle	1:46.67	16 Q	1:45.23 NR	5 Q	1:45.27	6
Luca de Tullio	800 m freestyle	7:53.04	13	—N/a		Did not advance	
Marco de Tullio	400 m freestyle	3:45.88	8 Q	—N/a		3:44.92	6
Leonardo Deplano	50 m freestyle	21.62	5 Q	21.59	5 Q	21.52	4
Manuel Frigo	100 m freestyle	48.08	12 Q	48.18	15	Did not advance	
Christian Mantegazza	200 m breaststroke	2:11.10	13 Q	2:10.58	12	Did not advance	
Nicolò Martinenghi	50 m breaststroke	26.90	9 Q	27.03	13	Did not advance	
Nicolò Martinenghi	100 m breaststroke	58.84	3 Q	58.62	2 Q	58.58	2nd place, silver medalist(s)
Nicolò Martinenghi	200 m breaststroke	Did not start		Did not advance			
Massimiliano Matteazzi	200 m individual medley	2:00.51	22	Did not advance			
Filippo Megli	200 m freestyle	1:46.39	13 Q	1:46.49	14	Did not advance	
Alberto Razzetti	200 m butterfly	1:54.54	4 Q	1:54.47	6 Q	1:54.85	6
Alberto Razzetti	200 m individual medley	1:58.14	7 Q	1:57.53	10	Did not advance	
Alberto Razzetti	400 m individual medley	4:14.52	12	—N/a		Did not advance	
Ludovico Viberti	100 m breaststroke	59.56	9 Q	58.89	3 Q	59.08	5
Lorenzo Zazzeri	50 m freestyle	21.87	14 Q	21.87	15	Did not advance	
Carlos D'Ambrosio; Thomas Ceccon; Lorenzo Zazzeri; Manuel Frigo; Leonardo Deplano (heats)	4 × 100 m freestyle relay	3:12.02	3 Q	—N/a		3:09.58 NR	2nd place, silver medalist(s)
Carlos D’Ambrosio; Filippo Megli; Marco De Tullio; Stefano Di Cola	4 × 200 m freestyle relay	7:05.17	4 Q	—N/a		7:05.54	7
Thomas Ceccon; Nicolò Martinenghi; Federico Burdisso; Carlos D'Ambrosio; Christian Bacico (heats); Ludovico Viberti (heats); Manuel Frigo (heats)	4 × 100 m medley relay	3:30.40	3 Q	—N/a		3:28.72	4

Women

Athlete	Event	Heat		Semi-final		Final	
Athlete	Event	Time	Rank	Time	Rank	Time	Rank
Lisa Angiolini	100 m breaststroke	1:06.59	9 Q	1:06.40	12	Did not advance	
Lisa Angiolini	200 m breaststroke	2:26.98	18	Did not advance			
Anita Bottazzo	50 m breaststroke	30.42	7 Q	30.31	7 Q	30.21	4
Anita Bottazzo	100 m breaststroke	1:06.83	10 Q	1:05.61	2 Q	1:06.06	6
Costanza Cocconcelli	100 m butterfly	58.31	16 Q	57.94	15	Did not advance	
Sara Curtis	50 m freestyle	24.41 NR	3 Q	24.48	9	Did not advance	
Sara Curtis	100 m freestyle	53.53	2 Q	53.39	7 Q	53.41	8
Silvia di Pietro	50 m freestyle	Did not start		Did not advance			
Silvia di Pietro	50 m butterfly	25.49 NR	3 Q	25.58	6 Q	25.64	7
Francesca Fangio	200 m breaststroke	2:27.01	19	Did not advance			
Sara Franceschi	200 m individual medley	2:12.91	21	Did not advance			
Sara Franceschi	400 m individual medley	4:50.23	17	—N/a		Did not advance	
Anita Gastaldi	100 m backstroke	1:01.20	21	Did not advance			
Anita Gastaldi	200 m individual medley	2:13.07	22	Did not advance			
Emma Virginia Menicucci	100 m freestyle	54.45	18	Did not advance			
Bianca Nannucci	200 m freestyle	1:59.24	25	Did not advance			
Benedetta Pilato	50 m breaststroke	30.46	8 Q	30.20	3 Q	30.14	3rd place, bronze medalist(s)
Simona Quadarella	800 m freestyle	8:20.47	5 Q	—N/a		8:12.81 ER	4
Simona Quadarella	1500 m freestyle	15:47.43	3 Q	—N/a		15:31.79 ER	2nd place, silver medalist(s)
Sara Curtis; Chiara Tarantino; Sofia Morini; Emma Virginia Menicucci	4 × 100 m freestyle relay	3:36.67	7 Q	—N/a		3:35.18 NR	7
Anna Chiara Mascolo; Bianca Nannucci; Matilde Biagiotti; Emma Virginia Menicucci; Sofia Morini (heats)	4 × 200 m freestyle relay	7:57.02	7 Q	—N/a		7:54.16	7
Anita Gastaldi; Lisa Angiolini; Costanza Cocconcelli; Emma Virginia Menicucci	4 × 100 m medley relay	4:00.12	10	—N/a		Did not advance	

Mixed

Athlete	Event	Heat		Final	
Athlete	Event	Time	Rank	Time	Rank
Manuel Frigo; Carlos D'Ambrosio; Sara Curtis; Emma Virginia Menicucci; Lorenzo Zazzeri (heats); Chiara Tarantino (heats)	4 × 100 m freestyle relay	3:24.84	6 Q	3:21.48 NR	4
Christian Bacico; Nicolò Martinenghi; Costanza Cocconcelli; Sara Curtis; Ludovico Viberti (heats)	4 × 100 m medley relay	3:42.19	1 Q	3:42.19	6

== Water polo ==
Summary

Team	Event	Group stage				Playoff	Quarterfinal	Semi-final	Final / BM	
Team	Event	Opposition Score	Opposition Score	Opposition Score	Rank	Opposition Score	Opposition Score	Opposition Score	Opposition Score	Rank
Italy	Men's tournament	Romania; W 17–5	Serbia; W 17–16 (PSO)	South Africa; W 28–4	1 Q	Bye	Greece; L 11–17	Montenegro; L 8–12	United States; W 9–8	7
Italy	Women's tournament	New Zealand; W 14–9	Australia; L 15–19	Singapore; W 32–5	2 P/off	China; W 13–11	Hungary; L 9–12	Netherlands; L 13–16	Japan; W 20–15	7

=== Men's tournament ===
Team roster

The following is the Italian roster.

Head coach: Sandro Campagna

- 1 Gianmarco Nicosia GK
- 2 Francesco Di Fulvio FP
- 3 Luca Damonte FP
- 4 Giacomo Cannella FP
- 5 Filippo Ferrero FP
- 6 Tommaso Gianazza FP
- 7 Mario del Basso FP
- 8 Francesco Condemi FP
- 9 Nicholas Presciutti FP
- 10 Lorenzo Bruni FP
- 11 Edoardo Di Somma FP
- 12 Alessandro Velotto FP
- 13 Tommaso Baggi Necchi GK
- 14 Francesco Lorenzo Cassia FP
- 15 Matteo Iocchi Gratta FP

Group play

Pos	Team	Pld	W	PSW	PSL	L	GF	GA	GD	Pts	Qualification
1	Italy	3	2	1	0	0	58	22	+36	8	Quarterfinals
2	Serbia	3	2	0	1	0	59	25	+34	7	Playoffs
3	Romania	3	1	0	0	2	38	41	−3	3	Playoffs
4	South Africa	3	0	0	0	3	12	79	−67	0	13–16th place semifinals

Source: Omegatiming
Rules for classification: 1) points; 2) head-to-head points; 3) head-to-head goal difference; 4) head-to-head number of goals scored; 5) Goal difference.

12 July 2025; 20:45	Report	Romania	5–17	Italy	OCBC Aquatic Centre, Singapore; Referees: Zhang Liang (CHN), Georgios Stavridis (GRE)
12 July 2025; 20:45	Report	Score by quarters: 2–1, 0–5, 2–6, 1–5			OCBC Aquatic Centre, Singapore; Referees: Zhang Liang (CHN), Georgios Stavridis (GRE)
12 July 2025; 20:45	Report	Neamtu 3	Goals	Condemi 4	OCBC Aquatic Centre, Singapore; Referees: Zhang Liang (CHN), Georgios Stavridis (GRE)

14 July 2025; 20:45	Report	Italy	17–16 (PSO)	Serbia	OCBC Aquatic Centre, Singapore; Referees: Scott Voltz (USA), Boris Margeta (SLO)
14 July 2025; 20:45	Report	Score by quarters: 3–2, 3–3, 4–4, 3–4 PSO: 4–3			OCBC Aquatic Centre, Singapore; Referees: Scott Voltz (USA), Boris Margeta (SLO)
14 July 2025; 20:45	Report	Cannella 3	Goals	Mandić 5	OCBC Aquatic Centre, Singapore; Referees: Scott Voltz (USA), Boris Margeta (SLO)

16 July 2025; 13:45	Report	Italy	28–4	South Africa	OCBC Aquatic Centre, Singapore; Referees: Georgios Stavridis (GRE), Evan Andrews (CAN)
16 July 2025; 13:45	Report	Score by quarters: 6–1, 9–0, 8–1, 5–2			OCBC Aquatic Centre, Singapore; Referees: Georgios Stavridis (GRE), Evan Andrews (CAN)
16 July 2025; 13:45	Report	Cassia, Ferrero 4	Goals	four players 1	OCBC Aquatic Centre, Singapore; Referees: Georgios Stavridis (GRE), Evan Andrews (CAN)

Quarterfinals

20 July 2025; 16:00	Report	Italy	11–17	Greece	OCBC Aquatic Centre, Singapore; Referees: Andrej Franulović (CRO), Boris Margeta (SLO)
20 July 2025; 16:00	Report	Score by quarters: 1–6, 1–3, 4–4, 5–4			OCBC Aquatic Centre, Singapore; Referees: Andrej Franulović (CRO), Boris Margeta (SLO)
20 July 2025; 16:00	Report	Bruni 3	Goals	Argyropoulos 4	OCBC Aquatic Centre, Singapore; Referees: Andrej Franulović (CRO), Boris Margeta (SLO)

5th–8th place semifinals

22 July 2025; 16:00	Report	Italy	8–12	Montenegro	OCBC Aquatic Centre, Singapore; Referees: Germán Moller (ARG), Georgios Stavridis (GRE)
22 July 2025; 16:00	Report	Score by quarters: 0–3, 3–4, 1–2, 4–3			OCBC Aquatic Centre, Singapore; Referees: Germán Moller (ARG), Georgios Stavridis (GRE)
22 July 2025; 16:00	Report	Di Fulvio, Di Somma 2	Goals	Vukotić 4	OCBC Aquatic Centre, Singapore; Referees: Germán Moller (ARG), Georgios Stavridis (GRE)

Seventh place game

24 July 2025; 16:00	Report	Italy	9–8	United States	OCBC Aquatic Centre, Singapore; Referees: Zhang Liang (CHN), Germán Moller (ARG)
24 July 2025; 16:00	Report	Score by quarters: 3–3, 2–1, 2–2, 2–2			OCBC Aquatic Centre, Singapore; Referees: Zhang Liang (CHN), Germán Moller (ARG)
24 July 2025; 16:00	Report	Di Somma, Ferrero 2	Goals	R. Dodd 3	OCBC Aquatic Centre, Singapore; Referees: Zhang Liang (CHN), Germán Moller (ARG)

=== Women's tournament ===
Team roster

The following is the Italian roster.

Head coach: Carlo Silipo

- 1 Aurora Condorelli GK
- 2 Morena Leone FP
- 3 Paola di Maria FP
- 4 Sara Cordovani FP
- 5 Veronica Gant FP
- 6 Lucrezia Cergol FP
- 7 Sofia Giustini FP
- 8 Roberta Bianconi FP
- 9 Dafne Bettini FP
- 10 Chiara Ranalli FP
- 11 Agnese Cocchiere FP
- 12 Gaia Gagliardi FP
- 13 Helga Maria Santapaola GK
- 14 Alessia Millo FP
- 15 Carlotta Meggiato FP

Group play

Pos	Team	Pld	W	PSW	PSL	L	GF	GA	GD	Pts	Qualification
1	Australia	3	3	0	0	0	68	23	+45	9	Quarterfinals
2	Italy	3	2	0	0	1	61	33	+28	6	Playoffs
3	New Zealand	3	1	0	0	2	37	36	+1	3	Playoffs
4	Singapore (H)	3	0	0	0	3	14	88	−74	0	13–16th place semifinals

Source: Omegatiming
Rules for classification: 1) points; 2) head-to-head points; 3) head-to-head goal difference; 4) head-to-head number of goals scored; 5) Goal difference.
(H) Host

11 July 2025; 17:35	Report	Italy	14–9	New Zealand	OCBC Aquatic Centre, Singapore; Referees: Aurély Blanchard (FRA), Tamás Kovács-Csatlós (HUN)
11 July 2025; 17:35	Report	Score by quarters: 1–2, 3–4, 5–2, 5–1			OCBC Aquatic Centre, Singapore; Referees: Aurély Blanchard (FRA), Tamás Kovács-Csatlós (HUN)
11 July 2025; 17:35	Report	three players 3	Goals	Weston 2	OCBC Aquatic Centre, Singapore; Referees: Aurély Blanchard (FRA), Tamás Kovács-Csatlós (HUN)

13 July 2025; 17:35	Report	Australia	19–15	Italy	OCBC Aquatic Centre, Singapore; Referees: David Gómez (ESP), Frank Ohme (GER)
13 July 2025; 17:35	Report	Score by quarters: 4–3, 4–2, 6–4, 5–6			OCBC Aquatic Centre, Singapore; Referees: David Gómez (ESP), Frank Ohme (GER)
13 July 2025; 17:35	Report	A. Andrews 5	Goals	Ranalli 6	OCBC Aquatic Centre, Singapore; Referees: David Gómez (ESP), Frank Ohme (GER)

15 July 2025; 19:10	Report	Italy	32–5	Singapore	OCBC Aquatic Centre, Singapore; Referees: Chisato Kurosaki (JPN), Maxim Gerasimov (GBR)
15 July 2025; 19:10	Report	Score by quarters: 8–0, 8–1, 6–1, 10–3			OCBC Aquatic Centre, Singapore; Referees: Chisato Kurosaki (JPN), Maxim Gerasimov (GBR)
15 July 2025; 19:10	Report	Cocchiere 6	Goals	Lee 2	OCBC Aquatic Centre, Singapore; Referees: Chisato Kurosaki (JPN), Maxim Gerasimov (GBR)

Playoffs

17 July 2025; 16:00	Report	Italy	13–11	China	OCBC Aquatic Centre, Singapore; Referees: Jennifer McCall (USA), Marta Cabanas (ESP)
17 July 2025; 16:00	Report	Score by quarters: 2–0, 4–5, 5–4, 2–2			OCBC Aquatic Centre, Singapore; Referees: Jennifer McCall (USA), Marta Cabanas (ESP)
17 July 2025; 16:00	Report	Bettini, Bianconi 3	Goals	Wang S., Yan S. 2	OCBC Aquatic Centre, Singapore; Referees: Jennifer McCall (USA), Marta Cabanas (ESP)

Quarterfinals

19 July 2025; 19:10	Report	Hungary	12–9	Italy	OCBC Aquatic Centre, Singapore; Referees: Jennifer McCall (USA), Boris Margeta (SLO)
19 July 2025; 19:10	Report	Score by quarters: 3–3, 3–2, 4–2, 2–2			OCBC Aquatic Centre, Singapore; Referees: Jennifer McCall (USA), Boris Margeta (SLO)
19 July 2025; 19:10	Report	Keszthelyi 4	Goals	Ranalli 4	OCBC Aquatic Centre, Singapore; Referees: Jennifer McCall (USA), Boris Margeta (SLO)

Semifinals

21 July 2025; 20:00	Report	Italy	13–16	Netherlands	OCBC Aquatic Centre, Singapore; Referees: Tamás Kovács-Csatlós (HUN), Marta Cabanas (ESP)
21 July 2025; 20:00	Report	Score by quarters: 2–6, 4–2, 3–5, 4–3			OCBC Aquatic Centre, Singapore; Referees: Tamás Kovács-Csatlós (HUN), Marta Cabanas (ESP)
21 July 2025; 20:00	Report	Cocchiere 3	Goals	Keuning, L. Rogge 3	OCBC Aquatic Centre, Singapore; Referees: Tamás Kovács-Csatlós (HUN), Marta Cabanas (ESP)

Final

23 July 2025; 16:00	Report	Japan	15–20	Italy	OCBC Aquatic Centre, Singapore; Referees: Aurély Blanchard (FRA), Nicholas Hodgers (AUS)
23 July 2025; 16:00	Report	Score by quarters: 5–5, 2–5, 2–6, 6–4			OCBC Aquatic Centre, Singapore; Referees: Aurély Blanchard (FRA), Nicholas Hodgers (AUS)
23 July 2025; 16:00	Report	Fukuda 3	Goals	Cergol, Gagliardi 5	OCBC Aquatic Centre, Singapore; Referees: Aurély Blanchard (FRA), Nicholas Hodgers (AUS)
