= Hungary at the 2025 World Aquatics Championships =

- Flag of Hungary
- World Aquatics code: HUN
- National federation: Hungarian Swimming Association
- Website: https://hunswim.com

in Singapore 11 July 2025 – 3 August 2025
- Competitors: 70 in 4 sports
- Medals Ranked 14th: Gold 1 Silver 3 Bronze 3 Total 7

World Aquatics Championships appearances (overview)
- 1973; 1975; 1978; 1982; 1986; 1991; 1994; 1998; 2001; 2003; 2005; 2007; 2009; 2011; 2013; 2015; 2017; 2019; 2022; 2023; 2024; 2025

Hungary is scheduled to compete at the 2025 World Aquatics Championships in Singapore from July 11 to August 3, 2025.

The Hungarian team consisted of 70 athletes (29 men and 41 women) competing in four disciplines.

== Medalists ==
Medal	Name	Sport	Event	Date
1st place, gold medalist(s)	Hubert Kós	Swimming	Men's 200 m backstroke	1 August 2025
2nd place, silver medalist(s)	Dávid Betlehem	Open water swimming	Men's 3 km knockout sprints	19 July 2025
2nd place, silver medalist(s)	Hungary women's national water polo team: Boglárka Neszmély Dorottya Szilágyi Vanda Vályi Eszter Varró Kinga Peresztegi-Nagy Nóra Sümegi Dalma Dömsödi Rita Keszthelyi (c); Dóra Leimeter Natasa Rybanska Kamilla Faragó Krisztina Garda Luca Torma Panna Tiba Kata Hajdú	Water polo	Women's tournament	23 July 2025
2nd place, silver medalist(s)	Hungary men's national water polo team: Kristóf Csoma Dániel Angyal Krisztián Manhercz (c) Erik Molnár Márton Vámos Ádám Nagy Gergő Fekete Gergely Burián; Péter Kovács Vendel Vigvári Szilárd Jansik Vince Vigvári Márton Mizsei Ákos Nagy Zsombor Vismeg	Water polo	Men's tournament	24 July 2025
3rd place, bronze medalist(s)	Bettina Fábián	Open water swimming	Women's 3 km knockout sprints	19 July 2025
3rd place, bronze medalist(s)	Bettina Fábián; Viktória Mihályvári-Farkas; Kristóf Rasovszky; Dávid Betlehem	Open water swimming	Team relay	20 July 2025
3rd place, bronze medalist(s)	Hubert Kós	Swimming	200 m individual medley	31 July 2025

== Athletes by discipline ==
The following is the list of number of competitors participating at the Championships per discipline.

Sport	Men	Women	Total
Artistic swimming	0	12	12
Diving	0	0	0
High diving	0	0	0
Open water swimming*	2	3	5
Swimming	12	11	23
Water polo	15	15	30
Total	29	41	70

*Note: Four open water swimmers also qualified for the swimming competition: Dávid Betlehem, Bettina Fábián, Viktória Mihályvári-Farkas and Kristóf Rasovszky

== Artistic swimming ==
The Hungarian Swimming Association named a team of 12 athletes (all women).

Women

Participating athletes – duet:

- Blanka Barbócz
- Blanka Taksonyi

Participating athletes – team:

- Zsófia Almádi (F) (A)
- Blanka Barbócz (F) (T) (A)
- Angelika Bastianelli (F) (T) (A r)
- Szonja Boros (A)
- Nóra Császik (F) (T)
- Léda Duhonyi (F) (T r) (A)
- Gréta Fehér (F) (T) (A)
- Titanilla Janku (F) (T) (A)
- Luca Sára Kis (F r) (T r)
- Dorka Kovács (T) (A r)
- Réka Márialigeti (F r) (T) (A)
- Blanka Taksonyi (F) (T) (A)

Note: F – Free routine; T – Technical routine; A – Arobatic routine; r – Reserve;

Athlete	Event	Preliminaries		Final	
Athlete	Event	Points	Rank	Points	Rank
Blanka Barbócz; Blanka Taksonyi	Duet technical routine	238.2042	23	Did not advance	
Blanka Barbócz; Blanka Taksonyi	Duet free routine	214.8972	18	Did not advance	

Team

Athletes	Event	Preliminaries		Final	
Athletes	Event	Points	Rank	Points	Rank
Zsófia Almádi; Blanka Barbócz; Angelika Bastianelli; Nóra Császik; Léda Duhonyi; Gréta Fehér; Titanilla Janku; Blanka Taksonyi	Team free routine	222.8117	15	Did not advance	
Blanka Barbócz; Angelika Bastianelli; Nóra Császik; Gréta Fehér; Titanilla Janku; Dorka Kovács; Réka Márialigeti; Blanka Taksonyi	Team technical routine	217.8617	21	Did not advance	
Zsófia Almádi; Blanka Barbócz; Szonja Boros; Léda Duhonyi; Gréta Fehér; Titanilla Janku; Réka Márialigeti; Blanka Taksonyi	Team acrobatic routine	150.2713	20	Did not advance	

== Open water swimming ==
The Hungarian Swimming Association entered five open water swimmers, four of whom also qualified for the pool competitions.

Men

Participating athletes:

- Dávid Betlehem
- Kristóf Rasovszky

Athlete	Event	Heat		Semi-final		Final	
Athlete	Event	Time	Rank	Time	Rank	Time	Rank
Dávid Betlehem	Men's 3 km knockout sprints	17:01.4	2 Q	11:27.8	2 Q	5:47.7	2nd place, silver medalist(s)
Kristóf Rasovszky	Men's 3 km knockout sprints	17:05.0	5 Q	11:32.6	9 Q	6:06.0	6
Dávid Betlehem	Men's 5 km	—N/a				57:37.2	6
Kristóf Rasovszky	Men's 5 km	—N/a				58:08.8	14
Dávid Betlehem	Men's 10 km	—N/a				2:01:13.8	9
Kristóf Rasovszky	Men's 10 km	—N/a				2:03:05.5	13

Women

Participating athletes:

- Janka Juhász
- Viktória Mihályvári-Farkas
- Bettina Fábián

Athlete	Event	Heat		Semi-final		Final	
Athlete	Event	Time	Rank	Time	Rank	Time	Rank
Janka Juhász	Women's 3 km knockout sprints	18:56.4	34	Did not advance			
Bettina Fábián	Women's 3 km knockout sprints	18:34.7	18 Q	12:11.3	8 Q	6:23.1	3rd place, bronze medalist(s)
Bettina Fábián	Women's 5 km	—N/a				1:03:53.5	11
Viktória Mihályvári-Farkas	Women's 5 km	—N/a				1:02:39.4	7
Janka Juhász	Women's 10 km	—N/a				2:20:44.2	31
Viktória Mihályvári-Farkas	Women's 10 km	—N/a				2:11:34.3	13

Mixed

4 × 1,500 metre relay swimming.

Athlete	Event	Time	Rank
Bettina Fábián (17:37.4 – 11th); Viktória Mihályvári-Farkas (35:38.9 – 7th); Kristóf Rasovszky (52:42.4 – 5th); Dávid Betlehem	Team relay	1:09:16.7	3rd place, bronze medalist(s)

== Swimming ==
The following new records were set during this competition.

Date	Event	Athlete(s)	Time	Record
27 July	Women's 4 × 100 metre freestyle relay (Final)	Nikolett Pádár; Panna Ugrai; Petra Senánszky; Minna Ábrahám	3:36.34	NR
27 July	Men's 400 metre freestyle (Heat)	Zalán Sárkány	3:46.82	PB
28 July	Men's 100 metre backstroke (Semi-final)	Hubert Kós	52.21	NR
29 July	Men's 100 metre backstroke (Final)	Hubert Kós	52.20	NR
31 July	Men's 200 metre individual medley (Final)	Hubert Kós	1:55.34	PB
1 August	Women's 200 metre backstroke (Heat)	Dóra Molnár	2:08.53	PB
1 August	Men's 200 metre backstroke (Final)	Hubert Kós	1:53.19	ER, NR
2 August	Men's 50 metre backstroke (Heat)	Ádám Jászó	24.73	PB
2 August	Men's 50 metre backstroke (Heat)	Hubert Kós	24.62	=NR
2 August	Men's 50 metre backstroke (Semi-final)	Hubert Kós	24.50	NR
2 August	Men's 1500 metre freestyle (Heat)	Zalán Sárkány	14:47.89	PB
3 August	Women's 4 × 100 metre medley relay (Heat)	Dóra Molnár; Henrietta Fángli; Panna Ugrai; Minna Ábrahám	4:01.22	NR

The Hungarian Swimming Association entered total of 23 swimmers.

Men

Participating athletes:

- Dávid Betlehem
- Balázs Holló
- Ádám Jászó
- Hubert Kós
- Benedek Kovács
- Richárd Márton
- Dániel Mészáros
- Nándor Németh
- Kristóf Rasovszky
- Zalán Sárkány
- Szebasztián Szabó
- Gábor Zombori

Athlete	Event	Heat		Semi-final		Final	
Athlete	Event	Time	Rank	Time	Rank	Time	Rank
Szebasztián Szabó	50 m freestyle	21.83	11 Q	21.84	14	Did not advance	
Nándor Németh	100 m freestyle	48.07	10 Q	47.72	9	Did not advance	
Balázs Holló	200 m freestyle	1:48.09	30	Did not advance			
Kristóf Rasovszky	400 m freestyle	3:48.84	21	—N/a		Did not advance	
Zalán Sárkány	400 m freestyle	3:46.82 PB	13	—N/a		Did not advance	
Dávid Betlehem	800 m freestyle	7:50.57	10	—N/a		Did not advance	
Kristóf Rasovszky	800 m freestyle	8:05.09	21	—N/a		Did not advance	
Dávid Betlehem	1500 m freestyle	14:59.09	10	—N/a		Did not advance	
Zalán Sárkány	1500 m freestyle	14:47.89 PB	7 Q	—N/a		14:55.17	7
Ádám Jászó	50 m backstroke	24.73 PB	9 Q	24.74	12	Did not advance	
Hubert Kós	50 m backstroke	24.62 =NR	5 Q	24.50 NR	=5	24.62	8
Ádám Jászó	100 m backstroke	53.78	16 Q	53.62	15	Did not advance	
Hubert Kós	100 m backstroke	52.60	3 Q	52.21 NR	1 Q	52.20 NR	4
Benedek Kovács	200 m backstroke	1:56.40	4 Q	1:56.69	14	Did not advance	
Hubert Kós	200 m backstroke	1:56.71	9 Q	1:54.64	3 Q	1:53.19 ER	1st place, gold medalist(s)
Szebasztián Szabó	50 m butterfly	23.29	17	Did not advance			
Hubert Kós	100 m butterfly	Did not start					
Richárd Márton	200 m butterfly	1:55.51	11 Q	1:55:80	14	Did not advance	
Hubert Kós	200 m individual medley	1:57.93	4 Q	1:57.22	5 Q	1:55.34 PB	3rd place, bronze medalist(s)
Gábor Zombori	200 m individual medley	1:59.51	17	Did not advance			
Balázs Holló	400 m individual medley	4:13.88	9	—N/a		Did not advance	
Gábor Zombori	400 m individual medley	4:13.59	8 Q	—N/a		4:12.51	6
Nándor Németh; Dániel Mészáros; Ádám Jászó; Szebasztián Szabó; Hubert Kós*	4 × 100 m freestyle relay	3:12.71	7 Q	—N/a		3:12.75	6

Women

Participating athletes:

- Minna Ábrahám
- Bettina Fábián
- Henrietta Fángli
- Vivien Jackl
- Lora Komoróczy
- Viktória Mihályvári-Farkas
- Dóra Molnár
- Nikolett Pádár
- Petra Senánszky
- Eszter Szabó-Feltóthy
- Panna Ugrai

Athlete	Event	Heat		Semi-final		Final	
Athlete	Event	Time	Rank	Time	Rank	Time	Rank
Petra Senánszky	50 m freestyle	24.89	16 Q	24.87	16	Did not start	
Nikolett Pádár	100 m freestyle	Did not start					
Minna Ábrahám	200 m freestyle	1:57.65	12 Q	1:56.70	10	Did not advance	
Nikolett Pádár	200 m freestyle	1:58.62	19	Did not advance			
Bettina Fábián	400 m freestyle	4:14.31	20	—N/a		Did not advance	
Vivien Jackl	800 m freestyle	8:43.29	20	—N/a		Did not advance	
Viktória Mihályvári-Farkas	800 m freestyle	8:46.46	21	—N/a		Did not advance	
Vivien Jackl	1500 m freestyle	16:29.60	17	—N/a		Did not advance	
Viktória Mihályvári-Farkas	1500 m freestyle	16:28.04	15	—N/a		Did not advance	
Lora Komoróczy	50 m backstroke	28.57	27	Did not advance			
Lora Komoróczy	100 m backstroke	1:01.80	26	Did not advance			
Dóra Molnár	200 m backstroke	2:08.53 PB	2 Q	2:09.90	8 Q	2:09.74	7
Eszter Szabó-Feltóthy	200 m backstroke	2:12.08	23	Did not advance			
Henrietta Fángli	50 m breaststroke	30.67	=13 Q	30.81	14	Did not advance	
Henrietta Fángli	100 m breaststroke	1:07.08	19	Did not advance			
Vivien Jackl	400 m individual medley	4:43.02	11	—N/a		Did not advance	
Viktória Mihályvári-Farkas	400 m individual medley	4:49.50	16	—N/a		Did not advance	
Nikolett Pádár; Panna Ugrai; Petra Senánszky; Minna Ábrahám	4 × 100 m freestyle relay	3:37.04	8 Q	—N/a		3:36.34 NR	8
Dóra Molnár; Panna Ugrai; Nikolett Pádár; Minna Ábrahám	4 × 200 m freestyle relay	7:54.69	4 Q	—N/a		7:49.66	4
Dóra Molnár; Henrietta Fángli; Panna Ugrai; Minna Ábrahám	4 × 100 m medley relay	4:01.22 NR	12	—N/a		Did not advance	

Mixed

Athletes	Event	Heat		Final	
Athletes	Event	Time	Rank	Time	Rank
Nándor Németh; Hubert Kós; Nikolett Pádár; Minna Ábrahám	4 × 100 m freestyle relay	3:24.96	9	Did not advance	
TBD	4 × 100 m medley relay	Did not start^{ǂ}			

* The athlete swam in the heat.
^{ǂ} The Hungarian 4 × 100 meter medley relay ultimately did not start, as the team's only breaststroke specialist, Henrietta Fángli, was unable to participate due to health problems.

== Water polo ==
Summary

Team	Event	Group stage				Playoff	Quarterfinal	Semifinal	Final / BM	
Team	Event	Opposition Score	Opposition Score	Opposition Score	Rank	Opposition Score	Opposition Score	Opposition Score	Opposition Score	Rank
Hungary	Men's tournament	Australia; W 18–6	Japan; W 23–18	Spain; L 9–10	2 Q	Romania; W 15–11	Croatia; W 18–12	Serbia; W 19–18	Spain; L 13–15	2nd place, silver medalist(s)
Hungary	Women's tournament	Greece; W 10–9	Japan; W 33–13	Croatia; W 22–6	1 Q	Bye	Italy; W 12–9	Spain; W 15–9	Greece; L 9–12	2nd place, silver medalist(s)

=== Men's tournament ===
Hungary's men's water polo team qualified by finishing in the top two at the 2025 FINA Men's Water Polo World Cup in Bucharest, Romania.

Team roster

The team of 15 athletes was named on July 1, 2025.

Head coach: Zsolt Varga

- 1 Kristóf Csoma GK
- 2 Dániel Angyal CB
- 3 Krisztián Manhercz (c) D
- 4 Erik Molnár CF
- 5 Márton Vámos RW
- 6 Ádám Nagy D
- 7 Gergő Fekete D
- 8 Gergely Burián RW
- 9 Péter Kovács CF
- 10 Vendel Vigvári D
- 11 Szilárd Jansik CB
- 12 Vince Vigvári D
- 13 Márton Mizsei GK
- 14 Ákos Nagy RW
- 15 Zsombor Vismeg CB

Group play

Pos	Team	Pld	W	PSW	PSL	L	GF	GA	GD	Pts	Qualification
1	Spain	3	3	0	0	0	42	32	+10	9	Quarterfinals
2	Hungary	3	2	0	0	1	50	34	+16	6	Playoffs
3	Japan	3	1	0	0	2	46	56	−10	3	Playoffs
4	Australia	3	0	0	0	3	24	40	−16	0	13–16th place semifinals

Source: Omegatiming
Rules for classification: 1) points; 2) head-to-head points; 3) head-to-head goal difference; 4) head-to-head number of goals scored; 5) Goal difference.

12 July 2025; 17:35	Report	Hungary	18–6	Australia	OCBC Aquatic Centre, Singapore; Referees: Andrej Franulović (CRO), Boris Margeta (SLO)
12 July 2025; 17:35	Report	Score by quarters: 5–1, 4–0, 3–2, 6–3			OCBC Aquatic Centre, Singapore; Referees: Andrej Franulović (CRO), Boris Margeta (SLO)
12 July 2025; 17:35	Report	Vámos 3	Goals	Grgurevic 3	OCBC Aquatic Centre, Singapore; Referees: Andrej Franulović (CRO), Boris Margeta (SLO)

14 July 2025; 13:45	Report	Japan	18–23	Hungary	OCBC Aquatic Centre, Singapore; Referees: Georgios Stavridis (GRE), Germán Moller (ARG)
14 July 2025; 13:45	Report	Score by quarters: 5–5, 3–5, 3–5, 7–8			OCBC Aquatic Centre, Singapore; Referees: Georgios Stavridis (GRE), Germán Moller (ARG)
14 July 2025; 13:45	Report	Adachi, Watanabe 4	Goals	Vismeg 4	OCBC Aquatic Centre, Singapore; Referees: Georgios Stavridis (GRE), Germán Moller (ARG)

16 July 2025; 20:45	Report	Spain	10–9	Hungary	OCBC Aquatic Centre, Singapore; Referees: Andrej Franulović (CRO), Zhang Liang (CHN)
16 July 2025; 20:45	Report	Score by quarters: 2–2, 1–3, 2–3, 5–1			OCBC Aquatic Centre, Singapore; Referees: Andrej Franulović (CRO), Zhang Liang (CHN)
16 July 2025; 20:45	Report	Granados 4	Goals	Angyal, Vigvári 2	OCBC Aquatic Centre, Singapore; Referees: Andrej Franulović (CRO), Zhang Liang (CHN)

Playoff

18 July 2025; 17:35	Report	Romania	11–15	Hungary	OCBC Aquatic Centre, Singapore; Referees: Germán Moller (ARG), Georgios Stavridis (GRE)
18 July 2025; 17:35	Report	Score by quarters: 3–6, 3–2, 3–3, 2–4			OCBC Aquatic Centre, Singapore; Referees: Germán Moller (ARG), Georgios Stavridis (GRE)
18 July 2025; 17:35	Report	Georgescu 4	Goals	Burián 3	OCBC Aquatic Centre, Singapore; Referees: Germán Moller (ARG), Georgios Stavridis (GRE)

Quarterfinal

20 July 2025; 20:45	Report	Croatia	12–18	Hungary	OCBC Aquatic Centre, Singapore; Referees: Michiel Zwart (NED), David Gómez (ESP)
20 July 2025; 20:45	Report	Score by quarters: 6–6, 1–5, 2–2, 3–5			OCBC Aquatic Centre, Singapore; Referees: Michiel Zwart (NED), David Gómez (ESP)
20 July 2025; 20:45	Report	Butić 4	Goals	Manhercz 4	OCBC Aquatic Centre, Singapore; Referees: Michiel Zwart (NED), David Gómez (ESP)

Semifinal

22 July 2025; 21:35	Report	Serbia	18–19	Hungary	OCBC Aquatic Centre, Singapore; Referees: Andrej Franulović (CRO), Boris Margeta (SLO)
22 July 2025; 21:35	Report	Score by quarters: 3–6, 5–2, 4–8, 6–3			OCBC Aquatic Centre, Singapore; Referees: Andrej Franulović (CRO), Boris Margeta (SLO)
22 July 2025; 21:35	Report	Mandić 6	Goals	Fekete, Manhercz 4	OCBC Aquatic Centre, Singapore; Referees: Andrej Franulović (CRO), Boris Margeta (SLO)

Final

24 July 2025; 21:35	Report	Spain	15–13	Hungary	OCBC Aquatic Centre, Singapore; Referees: Georgios Stavridis (GRE), Boris Margeta (SLO)
24 July 2025; 21:35	Report	Score by quarters: 5–5, 2–1, 2–4, 6–3			OCBC Aquatic Centre, Singapore; Referees: Georgios Stavridis (GRE), Boris Margeta (SLO)
24 July 2025; 21:35	Report	Sanahuja, Granados 5	Goals	Burián 3	OCBC Aquatic Centre, Singapore; Referees: Georgios Stavridis (GRE), Boris Margeta (SLO)

=== Women's tournament ===
Hungary's women's water polo team qualified by finishing in the top two at the 2025 FINA Women's Water Polo World Cup in Alexandroupolis (Greece) and Super final in Chengdu (China).

Team roster

The team of 15 athletes was named on July 1, 2025.

Head coach: Sándor Cseh

- 1 Boglárka Neszmély GK
- 2 Dorottya Szilágyi LW
- 3 Vanda Vályi RW
- 4 Eszter Varró CF
- 5 Kinga Peresztegi-Nagy CB
- 6 Nóra Sümegi CB
- 7 Dalma Dömsödi CF
- 8 Rita Keszthelyi (c) RW
- 9 Dóra Leimeter LW
- 10 Natasa Rybanska CF
- 11 Kamilla Faragó D
- 12 Krisztina Garda D
- 13 Luca Torma GK
- 14 Panna Tiba RW
- 15 Kata Hajdú RW

Group play

Pos	Team	Pld	W	PSW	PSL	L	GF	GA	GD	Pts	Qualification
1	Hungary	3	3	0	0	0	65	28	+37	9	Quarterfinals
2	Greece	3	2	0	0	1	65	32	+33	6	Playoffs
3	Japan	3	1	0	0	2	53	70	−17	3	Playoffs
4	Croatia	3	0	0	0	3	25	78	−53	0	13–16th place semifinals

Source: Omegatiming
Rules for classification: 1) points; 2) head-to-head points; 3) head-to-head goal difference; 4) head-to-head number of goals scored; 5) Goal difference.

11 July 2025; 20:45	Report	Greece	9–10	Hungary	OCBC Aquatic Centre, Singapore; Referees: Jennifer McCall (USA), Frank Ohme (GER)
11 July 2025; 20:45	Report	Score by quarters: 2–1, 3–3, 0–4, 4–2			OCBC Aquatic Centre, Singapore; Referees: Jennifer McCall (USA), Frank Ohme (GER)
11 July 2025; 20:45	Report	Tricha 6	Goals	Rybanska 3	OCBC Aquatic Centre, Singapore; Referees: Jennifer McCall (USA), Frank Ohme (GER)

13 July 2025; 10:35	Report	Hungary	33–13	Japan	OCBC Aquatic Centre, Singapore; Referees: Germán Moller (ARG), Megan Perry (NZL)
13 July 2025; 10:35	Report	Score by quarters: 8–3, 8–2, 9–3, 8–5			OCBC Aquatic Centre, Singapore; Referees: Germán Moller (ARG), Megan Perry (NZL)
13 July 2025; 10:35	Report	Rybanska, Vályi 6	Goals	Arima 4	OCBC Aquatic Centre, Singapore; Referees: Germán Moller (ARG), Megan Perry (NZL)

15 July 2025; 20:45	Report	Croatia	6–22	Hungary	OCBC Aquatic Centre, Singapore; Referees: Fiona Haigh (AUS), Frank Ohme (GER)
15 July 2025; 20:45	Report	Score by quarters: 2–9, 2–5, 1–5, 1–3			OCBC Aquatic Centre, Singapore; Referees: Fiona Haigh (AUS), Frank Ohme (GER)
15 July 2025; 20:45	Report	Rožić 4	Goals	Garda, Keszthelyi 4	OCBC Aquatic Centre, Singapore; Referees: Fiona Haigh (AUS), Frank Ohme (GER)

Quarterfinal

19 July 2025; 19:10	Report	Hungary	12–9	Italy	OCBC Aquatic Centre, Singapore; Referees: Jennifer McCall (USA), Boris Margeta (SLO)
19 July 2025; 19:10	Report	Score by quarters: 3–3, 3–2, 4–2, 2–2			OCBC Aquatic Centre, Singapore; Referees: Jennifer McCall (USA), Boris Margeta (SLO)
19 July 2025; 19:10	Report	Keszthelyi 4	Goals	Ranalli 4	OCBC Aquatic Centre, Singapore; Referees: Jennifer McCall (USA), Boris Margeta (SLO)

Semifinal

21 July 2025; 21:35	Report	Hungary	15–9	Spain	OCBC Aquatic Centre, Singapore; Referees: Alessia Ferrari (ITA), Andrej Franulović (CRO)
21 July 2025; 21:35	Report	Score by quarters: 6–2, 5–2, 3–2, 1–3			OCBC Aquatic Centre, Singapore; Referees: Alessia Ferrari (ITA), Andrej Franulović (CRO)
21 July 2025; 21:35	Report	Keszthelyi, Szilágyi 3	Goals	Ruiz 3	OCBC Aquatic Centre, Singapore; Referees: Alessia Ferrari (ITA), Andrej Franulović (CRO)

Final

23 July 2025; 21:35	Report	Greece	12–9	Hungary	OCBC Aquatic Centre, Singapore; Referees: Alessia Ferrari (ITA), Marta Cabanas (ESP)
23 July 2025; 21:35	Report	Score by quarters: 3–1, 5–3, 2–2, 2–3			OCBC Aquatic Centre, Singapore; Referees: Alessia Ferrari (ITA), Marta Cabanas (ESP)
23 July 2025; 21:35	Report	Tricha, Xenaki 3	Goals	Tiba, Hajdú 2	OCBC Aquatic Centre, Singapore; Referees: Alessia Ferrari (ITA), Marta Cabanas (ESP)
