= Germany at the 2025 World Aquatics Championships =

- Flag of Germany
- World Aquatics code: GER
- National federation: German Swimming Federation
- Website: www.dsv.de

in Singapore
- Competitors: 46 in 5 sports
- Medals Ranked 5th: Gold 6 Silver 3 Bronze 1 Total 10

World Aquatics Championships appearances
- 1991; 1994; 1998; 2001; 2003; 2005; 2007; 2009; 2011; 2013; 2015; 2017; 2019; 2022; 2023; 2024; 2025

Other related appearances
- East Germany (1973–1986); West Germany (1973–1986)

Germany are competing at the 2025 World Aquatics Championships in Singapore from July 11 to August 3, 2025.

== Athletes by discipline ==
The following is the number of competitors who will participate at the Championships per discipline.

Sport	Men	Women	Total
Artistic swimming	1	9	10
Diving	6	4	10
High diving	0	1	1
Open water swimming	2	4	6
Swimming	14	8	22
Total	21	25	46

- Isabel Gose, Oliver Klemet, and Florian Wellbrock each compete in open water swimming and swimming.

== Medalists ==
Medal	Name	Sport	Event	Date
1st place, gold medalist(s)	Florian Wellbrock	Open water swimming	Men's 10 km	16 July 2025
1st place, gold medalist(s)	Florian Wellbrock	Open water swimming	Men's 5 km	18 July 2025
1st place, gold medalist(s)	Florian Wellbrock	Open water swimming	Men's 3 km knockout sprints	19 July 2025
1st place, gold medalist(s)	Celine Rieder; Oliver Klemet; Isabel Gose; Florian Wellbrock	Open water swimming	Team relay	20 July 2025
1st place, gold medalist(s)	Lukas Märtens	Swimming	Men's 400 m freestyle	27 July 2025
1st place, gold medalist(s)	Anna Elendt	Swimming	Women's 100 metre breaststroke	29 July 2025
2nd place, silver medalist(s)	Sven Schwarz	Swimming	Men's 800 m freestyle	30 July 2025
2nd place, silver medalist(s)	Pauline Pfeif	Diving	Women's 10 m platform	31 July 2025
2nd place, silver medalist(s)	Sven Schwarz	Swimming	Men's 1500 m freestyle	3 August 2025
3rd place, bronze medalist(s)	Lukas Märtens	Swimming	Men's 800 m freestyle	30 July 2025

== Artistic swimming ==
Mixed

Athlete	Event	Preliminaries		Final	
Athlete	Event	Points	Rank	Points	Rank
Frithjof Seidel; Maria Denisov	Duet free routine	—		203.1574	9
Klara Bleyer; Amelie Blumenthal Haz; Maria Denisov; Solène Guisard; Johanna Karb; Daria Martens; Frithjof Seidel; Zsofia Szalkay; Daria Tonn; Thea Zehentner	Team acrobatic routine	142.7017	21	Did not advance	

Women

Athlete	Event	Preliminaries		Final	
Athlete	Event	Points	Rank	Points	Rank
Klara Bleyer	Solo technical routine	250.7250	5 Q	253.2892	5
Klara Bleyer	Solo free routine	229.9099	4 Q	237.5600	5
Amélie Blumenthal Haz; Klara Bleyer	Duet technical routine	261.1208	13	Did not advance	
Amélie Blumenthal Haz; Klara Bleyer	Duet free routine	242.4307	9 Q	245.1512	8

== Diving ==
Men

Athlete	Event	Preliminaries		Semi-finals		Final	
Athlete	Event	Points	Rank	Points	Rank	Points	Rank
Lou Massenberg	1 m springboard	357.80	10 Q	—		360.45	9
Moritz Wesemann	1 m springboard	350.60	12 Q	—		386.70	6
Timo Barthel	3 m springboard	323.15	46	Did not advance			
Moritz Wesemann	3 m springboard	441.25	6 Q	431.65	5 Q	467.10	6
Timo Barthel; Moritz Wesemann	3 m synchronized springboard	388.62	4 Q	—		319.89	8
Jaden Eikermann	10 m platform	391.50	15 Q	433.20	10 Q	442.30	10
Ole Rösler	10 m platform	326.95	36	Did not advance			
Luis Avila Sanchez; Jaden Eikermann	10 m synchronized platform	373.14	8 Q	—		377.37	6

Women

Athlete	Event	Preliminaries		Semi-finals		Final	
Athlete	Event	Points	Rank	Points	Rank	Points	Rank
Lena Hentschel	1 m springboard	238.65	13	—		Did not advance	
Lena Hentschel	3 m springboard	268.85	17 Q	287.05	8 Q	321.60	4
Jette Müller	3 m springboard	268.65	18 Q	279.40	13	Did not advance	
Lena Hentschel; Jette Müller	3 m synchronized springboard	258.15	7 Q	—		268.17	6
Pauline Pfeif	10 m platform	310.95	4 Q	340.75	3 Q	367.10	2nd place, silver medalist(s)
Carolina Coordes; Pauline Pfeif	10 m synchronized platform	253.68	12	—		Did not advance	

Mixed

Athlete	Event	Final	
Athlete	Event	Points	Rank
Lena Hentschel; Luis Avila Sanchez	3 m synchronized springboard	257.61	8
Lena Hentschel; Pauline Pfeif; Ole Rösler; Moritz Wesemann	Team event	360.85	8

== High diving ==
Athlete	Event	Rounds 1–4		Rounds 5–6	
Athlete	Event	Points	Rank	Points	Rank
Iris Schmidbauer	Women's high diving	222.70	15	Did not advance	

== Open water swimming ==
Men

Athlete	Event	Heats		Semifinal		Final	
Athlete	Event	Time	Rank	Time	Rank	Time	Rank
Oliver Klemet	Men's 3 km knockout sprints	17:05.7	6 Q	11:34.9	17	Did not advance	
Florian Wellbrock	Men's 3 km knockout sprints	17:00.4	1 Q	11:27.2	1 Q	5:46.0	1st place, gold medalist(s)
Oliver Klemet	Men's 5 km	—				57:42.2	9
Florian Wellbrock	Men's 5 km	—				57:26.4	1st place, gold medalist(s)
Oliver Klemet	Men's 10 km	—				2:00:10.4	4
Florian Wellbrock	Men's 10 km	—				1:59:55.5	1st place, gold medalist(s)

Women

Athlete	Event	Heats		Semifinal		Final	
Athlete	Event	Time	Rank	Time	Rank	Time	Rank
Lea Boy	Women's 3 km knockout sprints	18:15.2	10 Q	12:11.7	10 Q	6:23.3	5
Isabel Gose	Women's 3 km knockout sprints	18:11.4	3 Q	12:10.0	3 Q	6:23.3	5
Celine Rieder	Women's 5 km	—				1:02:34.1	5
Jeannette Spiwoks	Women's 5 km	—				DNS	
Lea Boy	Women's 10 km	—				DNF	
Jeannette Spiwoks	Women's 10 km	—				2:12:36.3	15

Mixed

Athlete	Event	Time	Rank
Celine Rieder; Oliver Klemet; Isabel Gose; Florian Wellbrock	Team relay	1:09:13.3	1st place, gold medalist(s)

== Swimming ==
Men

Athlete	Event	Heat		Semi-final		Final	
Athlete	Event	Time	Rank	Time	Rank	Time	Rank
Josha Salchow	100 m freestyle	48.13	13 Q	47.88	11	Did not advance	
Oliver Klemet	400 m freestyle	3:45.72	7 Q	—		3:46.86	8
Lukas Märtens	400 m freestyle	3:43.81	2 Q	—		3:42.35	1st place, gold medalist(s)
Lukas Märtens	800 m freestyle	7:45.54	7 Q	—		7:40.19	3rd place, bronze medalist(s)
Sven Schwarz	800 m freestyle	7:43.60	3 Q	—		7:39.96	2nd place, silver medalist(s)
Sven Schwarz	1500 m freestyle	14:45.31	4 Q	—		14:35.69	2nd place, silver medalist(s)
Florian Wellbrock	1500 m freestyle	14:44.81	1 Q	—		14:44.29	5
Vincent Passek	50 m backstroke	24.79	13 Q	24.82	14	Did not advance	
Lukas Märtens	200 m backstroke	1:57.31	20	Did not advance			
Melvin Imoudu	50 m breaststroke	26.74	3 Q	26.77	5 Q	26.74	5
Lucas Matzerath	50 m breaststroke	27.25	19	Did not advance			
Melvin Imoudu	100 m breaststroke	59.58	10 Q	59.43	10	Did not advance	
Lucas Matzerath	100 m breaststroke	58.75	2 Q	58.93	4 Q	59.14	6
Luca Armbruster	50 m butterfly	23.28	16 Q	22.91 NR	7 Q	22.84 NR	6
Luca Armbruster	100 m butterfly	52.05	27	Did not advance			
Josha Salchow	100 m butterfly	52.24	29	Did not advance			
Cedric Büssing	400 m individual medley	4:18.95	19	—		Did not advance	
Josha Salchow; Rafael Miroslaw; Kaii Winkler; Luca Armbruster	4 × 100 metre freestyle relay	3:12.89	10	—		Did not advance	
Lukas Märtens; Rafael Miroslaw; Jarno Bäschnitt; Timo Sorgius	4 × 200 metre freestyle relay	7:07.54	9	—		Did not advance	
Lukas Märtens; Lucas Matzerath; Luca Armbruster; Josha Salchow	4 × 100 metre medley relay	DQ		—		Did not advance	

Women

Athlete	Event	Heat		Semi-final		Final	
Athlete	Event	Time	Rank	Time	Rank	Time	Rank
Angelina Köhler	50 m freestyle	25.56	32	Did not advance			
Nina Holt	100 m freestyle	54.26	15 Q	54.31	14	Did not advance	
Maya Werner	200 m freestyle	1:59.40	26	Did not advance			
Isabel Gose	400 m freestyle	4:05.07	7 Q	—		4:02.90	5
Maya Werner	400 m freestyle	4:06.75	8 Q	—		4:09.38	8
Isabel Gose	800 m freestyle	8:20.21	4 Q	—		8:18.23	6
Maya Werner	800 m freestyle	8:35.28	15	—		Did not advance	
Isabel Gose	1500 m freestyle	16:08.41	9	—		Did not advance	
Lise Seidel	200 m backstroke	2:10.00	11 Q	2:08.75	6 Q	2:10.01	8
Anna Elendt	50 m breaststroke	30.17	4 Q	30.40	9	Did not advance	
Anna Elendt	100 m breaststroke	1:06.01	2 Q	1:06.13	7 Q	1:05.19 NR	1st place, gold medalist(s)
Anna Elendt	200 m breaststroke	2:25.43	10 Q	2:24.39	11	Did not advance	
Angelina Köhler	50 m butterfly	25.65	10 Q	25.62	8 Q	25.50 NR	4
Angelina Köhler	100 m butterfly	56.49	2 Q	56.75	5 Q	56.57	6
Nina Holt; Nina Jazy; Julianna Bocska; Lise Seidel	4 × 100 m freestyle relay	3:38.30	10	—		Did not advance	
Lise Seidel; Anna Elendt; Angelina Köhler; Nina Holt	4 × 100 m medley relay	3:56.44	3 Q	—		3:56.02	6

Mixed

Athlete	Event	Heat		Final	
Athlete	Event	Time	Rank	Time	Rank
Josha Salchow; Rafael Miroslaw; Nina Holt; Nina Jazy	4 × 100 m freestyle relay	3:24.87 NR	7 Q	3:25.39	8
Vincent Passek; Lucas Matzerath; Angelina Köhler; Nina Holt	4 × 100 m medley relay	3:44.53	11	Did not advance	
