= Open water swimming at the 2025 World Aquatics Championships – Women's 10 km =

Women's 10 km at the 2025 World Aquatics Championships
- Venue: Sentosa Island
- Location: Singapore
- Dates: 16 July
- Competitors: 68 from 44 nations
- Winning time: 2:07:51.3

Medalists
gold medal	Moesha Johnson	Australia
silver medal	Ginevra Taddeucci	Italy
bronze medal	Lisa Pou	Monaco

The women's 10 km competition at the 2025 World Aquatics Championships was held on 16 July 2025. In the lead up to the event, several athletes were considered strong contenders, including Moesha Johnson, Chelsea Gubecka, Ginevra Taddeucci and Ana Marcela Cunha. The race was postponed twice, eventually taking place on 16 July at 16:00 SGT. It consisted of six 1.67 km (1.04 mi) laps off the coast of Palawan Beach, Sentosa.

Taddeucci and Johnson were leading at the halfway point, and in the last 500 metres of the race, Taddeucci, Johnson, and Monaco's Lisa Pou broke away to form the leading group going into the finish. Johnson finished first in a time of 2:07:51.3, Taddeucci finished second with 2:07:55.7, and Pou finished third with 2:07:57.5. Johnson's win gave Australia their first ever world title in the 10 km event, while Pou's bronze was Monaco's first ever medal at the World Aquatics Championships.

== Background ==
Sharon van Rouwendaal, the 2024 Olympic champion and 2024 world champion, and Leonie Beck, the 2023 world champion, were both not competing. This prompted SwimSwam to opine that the field was perhaps "the most wide-open in over a decade".

Australia's Moesha Johnson had won two Open Water Swimming World Cup races in 2025, and her compatriot Chelsea Gubecka, the 2023 silver medallist, was also in contention. Also competing were Italy's Ginevra Taddeucci, who had consistently medalled at international competitions; Brazil's Ana Marcela Cunha, who at 33 years old had won 16 World Championships medals in her career; and American 15-year-old Brinkleigh Hansen, the 2025 US national champion. American Claire Weinstein withdrew before the event.

Each World Aquatics member federation could enter up to two athletes.

== Postponements ==
On 15 July, World Aquatics announced the event was postponed from the planned start at 08:00 SGT on 15 July to 10:15 on 16 July due to poor water quality. The amount of E. coli bacteria in test samples taken on 13 July was higher than the "acceptable thresholds". The postponement decision was made after a review involving representatives from several committees and was to ensure athlete safety in the water. The source of the contamination was unknown.

Samples were taken again in the morning of 15 July with test results showing improvements in the E. coli amount, but they were still above acceptable levels. This caused a further postponement of the race to 16:00 on 16 July.

In the early hours of 16 July, after the test results had shown more improvements and were within acceptable levels, World Aquatics confirmed the race, now scheduled for 16:00, to go ahead at the rescheduled time.

Discussing the postponements after the race, Australian swimmer Moesha Johnson said: "none of us were really expecting any postponements, let alone two. So yesterday I was quite calm but today the nerves were definitely there this morning, having to wait until the afternoon is really, really tough. Especially watching the temperature and the sun come out and get hotter and hotter."

== Results ==
The race consisted of six 1.67 km (1.04 mi) laps off the coast of Palawan Beach, Sentosa. It started at 16:00 SGT.

Australia's Chelsea Gubecka took the lead off the start, before Poland's Klaudia Tarasiewicz overtook her 150 metres into the race. Around six minutes in, the neutral athlete Margarita Ershova took the lead, and she maintained it through the rest of the first lap.

Near the end of the second lap, Italy's Ginevra Taddeucci was in first and Australia's Moesha Johnson was in second. By the halfway point, a group of seven swimmers had broken away from the rest of the pack, and Johnson had taken the lead. By the end of lap four, the chasing group had rejoined the lead group.

Johnson increased her pace as the finish approached, and she drew five other swimmers with her to form a new leading group. The order was Johnson in first, Taddeucci in second, Monaco's Lisa Pou in third, and then María de Valdés and Ángela Martínez of Spain in fourth and fifth, respectively.

During the last half kilometre, the top three broke away from the two Spanish swimmers. Johnson finished first in a time of 2:07:51.3, Taddeucci finished second with 2:07:55.7, and Pou finished third with 2:07:57.5.

Johnson's win gave Australia its first ever world title in the 10 km event, while Pou's bronze was Monaco's first ever medal at the World Aquatics Championships.

The water temperature was over 30 °C (86 °F), which means it was within a degree of the upper limit of 31 °C (88 °F) that athletes were allowed to compete under. Commenting on the heat of the water, Johnson said: "Those conditions are indescribable. Unless you're out there, it's really hard to describe what we went through." The water was described on social media as being like "human soup".

Results
Rank	Swimmer	Nationality	Time
1st place, gold medalist(s)	Moesha Johnson	Australia	2:07:51.3
2nd place, silver medalist(s)	Ginevra Taddeucci	Italy	2:07:55.7
3rd place, bronze medalist(s)	Lisa Pou	Monaco	2:07:57.5
4	María de Valdés	Spain	2:08:09.6
5	Ángela Martínez	Spain	2:08:17.3
6	Ana Marcela Cunha	Brazil	2:09:21.9
7	Mafalda Rosa	Portugal	2:09:22.7
8	Ichika Kajimoto	Japan	2:09:27.8
9	Chelsea Gubecka	Australia	2:09:28.8
10	Barbara Pozzobon	Italy	2:09:30.3
11	Ekaterina Sorokina	Neutral Athletes B	2:09:39.8
12	Inès Delacroix	France	2:09:44.7
13	Viktória Mihályvári-Farkas	Hungary	2:11:34.3
14	Mariah Denigan	United States	2:11:54.1
15	Jeannette Spiwoks	Germany	2:12:36.3
16	Callan Lotter	South Africa	2:14:01.3
17	Viviane Jungblut	Brazil	2:14:17.4
18	Klaudia Tarasiewicz	Poland	2:15:06.0
19	Louna Kasvio	Finland	2:15:09.8
20	Teng Yu-wen	Chinese Taipei	2:15:54.2
21	Georgia Makri	Greece	2:16:07.6
22	Liu Yaxin	China	2:17:26.4
23	Julie Pleskotová	Czech Republic	2:18:02.5
24	Brinkleigh Hansen	United States	2:19:10.3
25	Catherine van Rensburg	South Africa	2:19:40.2
26	Emma Finlin	Canada	2:19:47.8
27	Candela Giordanino	Argentina	2:20:15.9
28	Wang Kexin	China	2:20:28.3
29	Špela Perše	Slovenia	2:20:39.8
30	Alena Benešová	Czech Republic	2:20:39.9
31	Janka Juhász	Hungary	2:20:44.2
32	Ofek Adir	Israel	2:20:44.5
33	Nip Tsz Yin	Hong Kong	2:20:52.8
34	Ana Abad	Ecuador	2:20:57.8
35	Malak Meqdar	Morocco	2:20:59.9
36	Paulina Alanís	Mexico	2:21:03.3
37	Nikita Lam	Hong Kong	2:21:04.7
38	Leonie Tenzer	Finland	2:21:08.4
39	Sharon Guerrero	Mexico	2:22:07.5
40	Chantal Liew	Singapore	2:22:07.9
41	Hwang Ji-yeon	South Korea	2:22:18.8
42	Su İnal	Turkey	2:23:55.8
43	Lin Jia-shien	Chinese Taipei	2:26:49.1
44	Yanci Vanegas	Guatemala	2:29:07.2
45	Kate Ona	Singapore	2:29:18.0
46	Britta Schwengle	Aruba	2:29:43.0
47	Darya Pushko	Kazakhstan	2:29:50.0
48	Daniela Suárez	Venezuela	2:29:52.3
49	Kim Sue-ah	South Korea	2:29:57.5
50	Cielo Peralta	Paraguay	2:31:46.5
50	Pilar Cañedo	Uruguay	2:31:46.5
52	Alondra Quiles	Puerto Rico	2:35:11.6
53	María Fernanda Arellanos	Peru	2:36:13.8
	Diksha Sandip Yadav	India	OTL
	Lea Boy	Germany	DNF
	Margarita Ershova	Neutral Athletes B	DNF
	Mariya Fedotova	Kazakhstan	DNF
	Isabella Hernández	Dominican Republic	DNF
	Caroline Jouisse	France	DNF
	Dayana Meléndez	El Salvador	DNF
	Christina Durán	Dominican Republic	DNF
	Ruthseli Aponte	Venezuela	DNF
	Chonpasanop Chatwuti	Thailand	DNF
	María Porres	Guatemala	DNF
	Alexandra Mejía	Andorra	DNF
	Danna Martínez	Ecuador	DNF
	Micheline Bathfield	Mauritius	DNF
	Kamonchanok Kwanmuang	Thailand	DNF
	Ashmitha Chandra	India	DNS

== Further information ==
- Women's 10km Open Water Swimming Finish (Video). World Aquatics. 16 July 2025 – via YouTube. – Video of the finish
- World Aquatics Championships: 25 Swimmers Fail to Finish Open Water Race Amid Afternoon Heat (Video). CNA. 16 July 2025 – via YouTube. – Report on the hot conditions during the race, including interviews with various swimmers
