= 2025 World Aquatics Championships =

22nd FINA World Championships

22nd World Aquatics Championships
- Host city: Singapore
- Date: 11 July – 3 August 2025
- Venue: 3
- Nations: 203+2
- Athletes: 2,500+
- Events: 77 in 6 sports
- Opened by: Tharman Shanmugaratnam
- Closed by: Husain Al-Musallam

The 2025 World Aquatics Championships, the 22nd edition of the World Aquatics Championships, were held in Singapore from 11 July to 3 August 2025. It was the first city in Southeast Asia to host the World Championships.

== Host selection ==
On 21 July 2019, World Aquatics (then FINA) selected Kazan, Russia as the host of the championship; the same day as Budapest, Hungary was selected for the 2027 edition. However, on 9 February 2023, Singapore was selected to replace Kazan as host city due to the Russian invasion of Ukraine.

== Venues ==
Most of the competitions were held at the Singapore Sports Hub built for the 2015 Southeast Asian Games.

Organisers initially considered hosting the swimming events at the National Stadium or the Singapore Indoor Stadium, but eventually decided to build a temporary venue on the site of Car Park G (known as World Aquatics Championships Arena) for the swimming and artistic swimming events.

- World Aquatics Championships Arena (artistic swimming, swimming)
- OCBC Aquatic Centre (diving, water polo)
- Sentosa Island (high diving, open water swimming)
- Singtel Waterfront Theatre (opening ceremony)

== Symbols ==
=== Theme ===
The theme of the 2025 World Aquatics Championships was "Water Shapes Us".

=== Mascots ===
On 2 April 2025, the mascots were announced as Ollie, an otter, and Dewey, a dugong.

== Schedule ==
The initial competition schedule was announced on 18 June 2024. The detailed competition schedule was released on 12 December 2024.

●	Opening ceremony	●	Preliminaries	●	Finals	●	Closing ceremony	M	Men's matches	W	Women's matches

July/August	10	11	12	13	14	15	16	17	18	19	20	21	22	23	24	25	26	27	28	29	30	31	1	2	3	Total
Ceremonies	●																								●	–
Swimming																		4	4	5	5	5	5	6	8	42
Open water swimming							2		2	2	1															7
Artistic swimming									●	2	1	2	2	1	1	2										11
Diving																	2	2	2	2	1	1	1	1	1	13
High diving															●	●	1	1								2
Water polo		W	M	W	M	W	M	W	M	W	M	W	M	W	M											2
Total	0	0	0	0	0	0	2	0	2	4	2	2	2	2	2	2	3	7	6	7	6	6	6	7	9	77
Cumulative Total	0	0	0	0	0	0	2	2	4	8	10	12	14	16	18	20	23	30	36	43	49	55	61	68	77	-

== Medal table ==
* Host nation (Singapore)

Rank	Nation	Gold	Silver	Bronze	Total
1	China	15	12	10	37
2	Australia	13	7	8	28
3	United States	10	11	11	32
–	Neutral Athletes B (Note: In accordance with sanctions imposed following by the 2022 Russian invasion of Ukraine, athletes from Russia were not permitted to use the name, flag, or anthem of Russian Federation. They instead participated as "Neutral Athletes B (NAB)" and under the World Aquatics flag.)	6	8	4	18
4	Germany	6	3	1	10
5	Spain	4	3	5	12
6	France	4	1	5	10
7	Canada	4	1	4	9
8	Italy	2	11	6	19
9	Romania	2	0	1	3
10	Tunisia	2	0	0	2
11	Japan	1	4	3	8
11	Mexico	1	4	3	8
13	Hungary	1	3	3	7
14	Great Britain	1	2	2	5
15	South Africa	1	2	1	4
16	Netherlands	1	0	2	3
17	Greece	1	0	1	2
18	Austria	1	0	0	1
18	Lithuania	1	0	0	1
20	Switzerland	0	2	0	2
–	Neutral Athletes A (Note: In accordance with sanctions imposed following by the 2022 Russian invasion of Ukraine, athletes from Belarus were not permitted to use the name, flag, or anthem of Republic of Belarus. They instead participated as "Neutral Athletes A (NAA)" and under the World Aquatics flag.)	0	1	2	3
21	Belgium	0	1	1	2
21	North Korea	0	1	1	2
23	Poland	0	1	0	1
23	Ukraine	0	1	0	1
25	Kyrgyzstan	0	0	1	1
25	Monaco	0	0	1	1
25	South Korea	0	0	1	1
Totals (27 entries)		77	79	77	233

Source: Worldaquatics

== Participating federations ==
203 countries, plus the Athlete Refugee Team and two Neutral Athletes teams (representing Belarusian and Russian athletes) competed.

- World Aquatics members not competing were British Virgin Islands, Chad, Gibraltar, Liberia and Liechtenstein.
- IOC members Kiribati, Nauru, South Sudan and Tuvalu did not compete as they were not members of World Aquatics.

Participating National Federations
- Afghanistan (1)
- Anguilla (1)
- Albania (2)
- Algeria (3)
- American Samoa (1)
- Andorra (3)
- Angola (5)
- Antigua and Barbuda (4)
- Argentina (23)
- Armenia (8)
- Athlete Refugee Team (3)
- Aruba (6)
- Australia (96)
- Austria (13)
- Azerbaijan (2)
- Bahamas (4)
- Bahrain (4)
- Bangladesh (2)
- Barbados (2)
- Belgium (5)
- Belize (1)
- Benin (3)
- Bermuda (1)
- Bhutan (2)
- Bolivia (9)
- Bosnia and Herzegovina (2)
- Botswana (3)
- Brazil (51)
- Brunei (3)
- Bulgaria (7)
- Burkina Faso (1)
- Burundi (2)
- Cambodia (2)
- Cameroon (4)
- Canada (65)
- Cape Verde (4)
- Cayman Islands (2)
- Central African Republic (1)
- Chile (14)
- China (96)
- Chinese Taipei (14)
- Colombia (15)
- Comoros (2)
- Cook Islands (3)
- Costa Rica (10)
- Croatia (50)
- Cuba (11)
- Curaçao (4)
- Cyprus (3)
- Czech Republic (15)
- Democratic Republic of the Congo (2)
- Denmark (13)
- Djibouti (1)
- Dominica (1)
- Dominican Republic (11)
- Ecuador (6)
- Egypt (11)
- El Salvador (5)
- Equatorial Guinea (1)
- Eritrea (2)
- Estonia (6)
- Eswatini (2)
- Ethiopia (2)
- Faroe Islands (4)
- Federated States of Micronesia (2)
- Fiji (4)
- Finland (5)
- France (68)
- Gabon (1)
- The Gambia (2)
- Georgia (11)
- Germany (46)
- Ghana (4)
- Great Britain (71)
- Greece (62)
- Grenada (2)
- Guam (3)
- Guatemala (7)
- Guinea (5)
- Guinea-Bissau (2)
- Guyana (2)
- Haiti (2)
- Honduras (5)
- Hong Kong (32)
- Hungary (70)
- Iceland (5)
- India (19)
- Indonesia (21)
- Iran (2)
- Iraq (2)
- Ireland (13)
- Israel (28)
- Italy (96)
- Ivory Coast (2)
- Jamaica (3)
- Japan (82)
- Jordan (2)
- Kazakhstan (27)
- Kenya (12)
- Kosovo (2)
- Kuwait (4)
- Kyrgyzstan (2)
- Laos (2)
- Latvia (3)
- Lebanon (4)
- Lesotho (2)
- Libya (2)
- Lithuania (13)
- Luxembourg (4)
- Macau (11)
- Madagascar (4)
- Malawi (3)
- Malaysia (12)
- Maldives (4)
- Mali (2)
- Malta (4)
- Marshall Islands (1)
- Mauritania (1)
- Mauritius (4)
- Mexico (41)
- Moldova (3)
- Monaco (3)
- Mongolia (8)
- Montenegro (17)
- Morocco (5)
- Mozambique (4)
- Myanmar (3)
- Namibia (6)
- Nepal (4)
- Netherlands (31)
- Neutral Athletes A (16)
- Neutral Athletes B (62)
- New Zealand (30)
- Nicaragua (2)
- Niger (1)
- Nigeria (4)
- North Korea (15)
- Northern Mariana Islands (4)
- Norway (8)
- Oman (2)
- Pakistan (3)
- Palau (2)
- Palestine (3)
- Panama (4)
- Papua New Guinea (4)
- Paraguay (4)
- Peru (9)
- Philippines (3)
- Poland (26)
- Portugal (7)
- Puerto Rico (5)
- Qatar (2)
- Republic of the Congo (2)
- Romania (21)
- Rwanda (4)
- Saint Kitts and Nevis (1)
- Saint Lucia (3)
- Saint Vincent and the Grenadines (1)
- Samoa (4)
- San Marino (1)
- São Tomé and Príncipe (1)
- Saudi Arabia (4)
- Senegal (2)
- Serbia (21)
- Seychelles (3)
- Singapore (71) (host)
- Sint Maarten (2)
- Slovakia (21)
- Slovenia (3)
- Solomon Islands (2)
- Somalia (1)
- South Africa (59)
- South Korea (35)
- Spain (67)
- Sri Lanka (6)
- Sudan (4)
- Suriname (2)
- Sweden (16)
- Switzerland (12)
- Syria (2)
- Tajikistan (2)
- Tanzania (2)
- Thailand (24)
- Timor-Leste (2)
- Togo (2)
- Tonga (2)
- Trinidad and Tobago (5)
- Tunisia (4)
- Turkey (9)
- Turkmenistan (4)
- Turks and Caicos Islands (2)
- Uganda (6)
- Ukraine (26)
- United Arab Emirates (2)
- United States (119)
- Uruguay (7)
- Uzbekistan (8)
- Vanuatu (2)
- Venezuela (12)
- Vietnam (4)
- Virgin Islands (2)
- Yemen (1)
- Zambia (2)
- Zimbabwe (7)

== Broadcasting ==
The Championships were broadcast on the World Aquatics website which can be accessed worldwide. The competition was broadcast through the rights-holding broadcasters in various countries and regions:

Rights-holding broadcasters
Region	Broadcaster(s)	Countries/Territories
Africa	SuperSport	Angola, Benin, Botswana, Burkina Faso, Burundi, Cameroon, Cape Verde, Central African Republic, Chad, Comoros Islands, Congo, Democratic Republic of Congo, Djibouti, Equatorial Guinea, Eritrea, Eswatini, Ethiopia, Gabon, Gambia, Ghana, Guinea, Guinea Bissau, Ivory Coast, Kenya, Lesotho, Liberia, Madagascar, Malawi, Mali, Mauritania, Mauritius, Mayotte, Mozambique, Namibia, Niger, Nigeria, Réunion, Rwanda, Sao Tome and Principe, Senegal, Seychelles, Sierra Leone, Socotra, Somalia (including Somaliland), South Africa, Saint Helena & Ascension, Sudan, South Sudan, Tanzania, Togo, Uganda, Zambia, Zimbabwe
Americas	NBC Sports / Peacock	United States, Guam, Puerto Rico, U.S. Virgin Islands
Americas	CBC	Canada
Americas	Grupo Globo	Brazil
Americas	DirecTV	Argentina, Bolivia, Chile, Colombia, Ecuador, Paraguay, Peru, Uruguay, Venezuela
Asia	TV Asahi	Japan
Asia	CMG / CCTV-5	China, Macau
Asia	ELTA	Chinese Taipei
Asia	Sky Sports	Republic of Korea
Asia	Mediacorp	Singapore (host country)
Asia	i-Cable (swimming only)	Hong Kong
Europe	Eurovision	Pan-Europe (excluding Belarus & Russia)
Europe	ORF	Austria
Europe	BHRT	Bosnia and Herzegovina
Europe	BNT	Bulgaria
Europe	HRT	Croatia
Europe	CYBC	Cyprus
Europe	CT	Czechia
Europe	Yle	Finland
Europe	France Télévisions	France
Europe	ARD / ZDF	Germany
Europe	ERT	Greece
Europe	MTVA	Hungary
Europe	RÚV	Iceland
Europe	The Sports Channel	Israel
Europe	Sky Italia / RAI	Italy
Europe	LRT	Lithuania
Europe	RTCG	Montenegro
Europe	NOS	Netherlands
Europe	RTV	North Macedonia
Europe	RTP	Portugal
Europe	TVR	Romania
Europe	RTS	Serbia
Europe	RTVS	Slovakia
Europe	RTVSLO	Slovenia
Europe	RTVE	Spain
Europe	SVT	Sweden
Europe	SRG SSR	Switzerland
Europe	TRT	Turkey
Europe	PBC	Ukraine
Europe	Aquatics GB	United Kingdom
Europe	Match TV	Russia, Belarus
Oceania	Nine Network	Australia

== See also ==
2025 World Para Swimming Championships - also hosted by Singapore
