= Open water swimming at the 2025 World Aquatics Championships =

- Host city: Singapore
- Date: 16–20 July
- Venue: Sentosa Island
- Events: 7

Open water swimming at the 2025 World Aquatics Championships was held from 16 to 20 July 2025 at Sentosa Island in Singapore. The programme consisted of seven events, including three for men, three for women, and one mixed event. The 3 km knockout sprint events were included for the first time at the world championships. The water temperatures were unusually high for the world championships, and several swimmers needed medical treatment after swimming. Water quality issues also caused the first two events in the programme – the men's and women's 10 km races – to be postponed.

Germany's Florian Wellbrock won all four gold medals available to him in the open water events. It was the first time this had ever been achieved at the World Aquatics Championships. Australia's Moesha Johnson also won a medal in all the individual events available to her, including winning gold in the women's 10 km and 5 km.

== Events ==
The programme consisted of a 10 km race, 5 km race, and 3 km knockout sprint, all of which had separate male and female races. The only mixed-gender event was the 4 × 1500 m relay. All events were contested in the waters near Sentosa Island in Singapore.

== Achievements ==
Germany's Florian Wellbrock won four gold medals, meaning he won every gold available to him in the open water events (the 10 km, 5 km, 3 km knockout sprint, and the mixed 4 × 1500 m relay). It was the first time this had ever been achieved at the World Aquatics Championships. Australia's Moesha Johnson won gold in the women's 10 km and 5 km events and bronze in the knockout sprint.

== Conditions ==
=== Heat ===
The water temperature reached over 30.8 °C (87.4 °F), which means it was within 0.2 degrees of the upper limit of 31 °C (88 °F) that athletes were allowed to compete under. The World Open Water Swimming Association wrote that the conditions were "among the most extreme ever faced at a world championships". Several swimmers needed medical treatment and three were hospitalized.

=== Postponements due to water quality ===
Both of the 10 km races, the first two events of the programme, were delayed due to high e. coli levels in the water. The women's 10 km was delayed from 08:00 SGT on 15 July to 10:15 on 16 July, and then it was rescheduled again to 16:00 on the same day. The men's 10 km was postponed from 07:30 to 13:00 on 16 July. The source of the contamination was unknown.

== Schedule ==
Seven events were held from 16 to 20 July 2025. After previously being contested at other international open water swimming events, the 3 km knockout sprint events were included in the World Championships for the first time.

Schedule
Event	Date	Time (Note: All times are local (Singapore Time).)
Men's 10 km	16 July 2025	13:00 (Note: Rescheduled time)
Women's 10 km	16 July 2025	16:00
Women's 5 km	18 July 2025	07:30
Men's 5 km	18 July 2025	10:00
Women's 3 km knockout sprint	19 July 2025	08:00
Men's 3 km knockout sprint	19 July 2025	10:00
Mixed 4 × 1500 m relay	20 July 2025	08:00

== Qualification ==
For the individual events, each World Aquatics member federation could enter up to two athletes per event. For the team event, each federation could enter one team consisting of two athletes of each gender.

== Medal summary ==
=== Medal table ===
Overall medal table
Rank	Nation	Gold	Silver	Bronze	Total
1	Germany	4	0	0	4
2	Australia	2	0	2	4
3	Japan	1	0	1	2
4	Italy	0	6	0	6
5	Hungary	0	1	2	3
6	France	0	0	2	2
7	Monaco	0	0	1	1
Totals (7 entries)		7	7	8	22

=== Men ===
Men
Event	Gold		Silver		Bronze	
3 km knockout sprint	Florian Wellbrock; Germany	5:46.0	Dávid Betlehem; Hungary	5:47.7	Marc-Antoine Olivier; France	5:51.1
5 km	Florian Wellbrock; Germany	57:26.4	Gregorio Paltrinieri; Italy	57:29.3	Marc-Antoine Olivier; France	57:30.4
10 km	Florian Wellbrock; Germany	1:59:55.5	Gregorio Paltrinieri; Italy	1:59:59.2	Kyle Lee; Australia	2:00:10.3

=== Women ===
Women
Event	Gold		Silver		Bronze	
3 km knockout sprint	Ichika Kajimoto; Japan	6:19.9	Ginevra Taddeucci; Italy	6:21.9	Moesha Johnson; Australia Bettina Fábián; Hungary	6:23.1
5 km	Moesha Johnson; Australia	1:02:01.3	Ginevra Taddeucci; Italy	1:02:02.3	Ichika Kajimoto; Japan	1:02:28.9
10 km	Moesha Johnson; Australia	2:07:51.3	Ginevra Taddeucci; Italy	2:07:55.7	Lisa Pou; Monaco	2:07:57.5

=== Mixed ===
Mixed
Event	Gold		Silver		Bronze	
Mixed 4 × 1500 metre relay	Germany; Celine Rieder; Oliver Klemet; Isabel Marie Gose; Florian Wellbrock	1:09:13.3	Italy; Barbara Pozzobon; Ginevra Taddeucci; Marcello Guidi; Gregorio Paltrinieri	1:09:15.4	Hungary; Bettina Fábián; Viktória Mihályvári-Farkas; Kristóf Rasovszky; Dávid Betlehem	1:09:16.7
