= Lisa Pou =

Monegasque swimmer (born 1999)

Personal information
- Full name: Lisa Lydie Madeleine Pou
- Nationality: French, Monegasque
- Born: 28 May 1999 (age 27) Fréjus, France

Sport
- Sport: Swimming
- Strokes: Open water swimming
Medal record
Women's swimming
Representing Monaco
World Championships
Bronze medal – third place	2025 Singapore	10 km open water
Games of the Small States of Europe
Gold medal – first place	2025 Andorra la Vella	1500 m freestyle
Gold medal – first place	2025 Andorra la Vella	400 m medley
Silver medal – second place	2025 Andorra la Vella	800 m freestyle
Bronze medal – third place	2025 Andorra la Vella	400 m freestyle
Bronze medal – third place	2025 Andorra la Vella	4×100 m freestyle
Bronze medal – third place	2025 Andorra la Vella	4×200 m freestyle
Representing France
European Championships
Bronze medal – third place	2018 Glasgow	Team event

Lisa Lydie Madeleine Pou (born 28 May 1999) is a Monegasque swimmer.

Representing France, Pou competed in the Team event at the 2018 European Aquatics Championships, winning the bronze medal.

In 2023, Pou switched her sporting nationality to Monaco. She became the first Monegasque swimmer to qualify for the Olympic Games, doing so in 2024.
