= Théo Druenne =

Monegasque swimmer (born 2005)

Personal information
- Nationality: Monegasque
- Born: 19 July 2005 (age 21) Monaco

Sport
- Country: Monaco
- Sport: Swimming

Théo Druenne (born 19 July 2005) is a Monegasque swimmer. He competed in the 2020 Summer Olympics. He took the 28th place for the men's 1500 m freestyle.

== Life ==
Théo Druenne was born on 19 July 2005 in Monaco.

== 2020 Summer Olympics ==
Théo Druenne was selected to represent Monaco at the Olympic Games 2020 in Tokyo engaged in 1500 m, freestyle. Druenne was the youngest member of the Monegasque delegation.

Druenne swam his 1500m freestyle heat in 16'17 ”20. He beat his personal best result by 20 seconds, achieved at the European Junior Championships in Budapest in May 2020 (16'37 ”80). With this result, Druenne took the 28th place at the Olympic Games.
