= Claudia Verdino =

Monegasque swimmer (born 2001)

Personal information
- Born: 28 November 2001 (age 24)

Sport
- Sport: Swimming

Claudia Verdino (born 28 November 2001) is a Monegasque swimmer. She competed in the women's 200 metre backstroke event at the 2017 World Aquatics Championships. In 2018, she competed in swimming at the 2018 Summer Youth Olympics held in Buenos Aires, Argentina.
