= Flag of Monaco =

Principality of Monaco
- Use: National flag
- Proportion: 4:5
- Adopted: 4 April 1881; 145 years ago
- Design: A horizontal bicolour of red and white
- Use: State and war flag, state and naval ensign
- Design: A white field with the coat of arms charged at the center
- Use: National flag and civil ensign
- Design: A white field with red lozenges

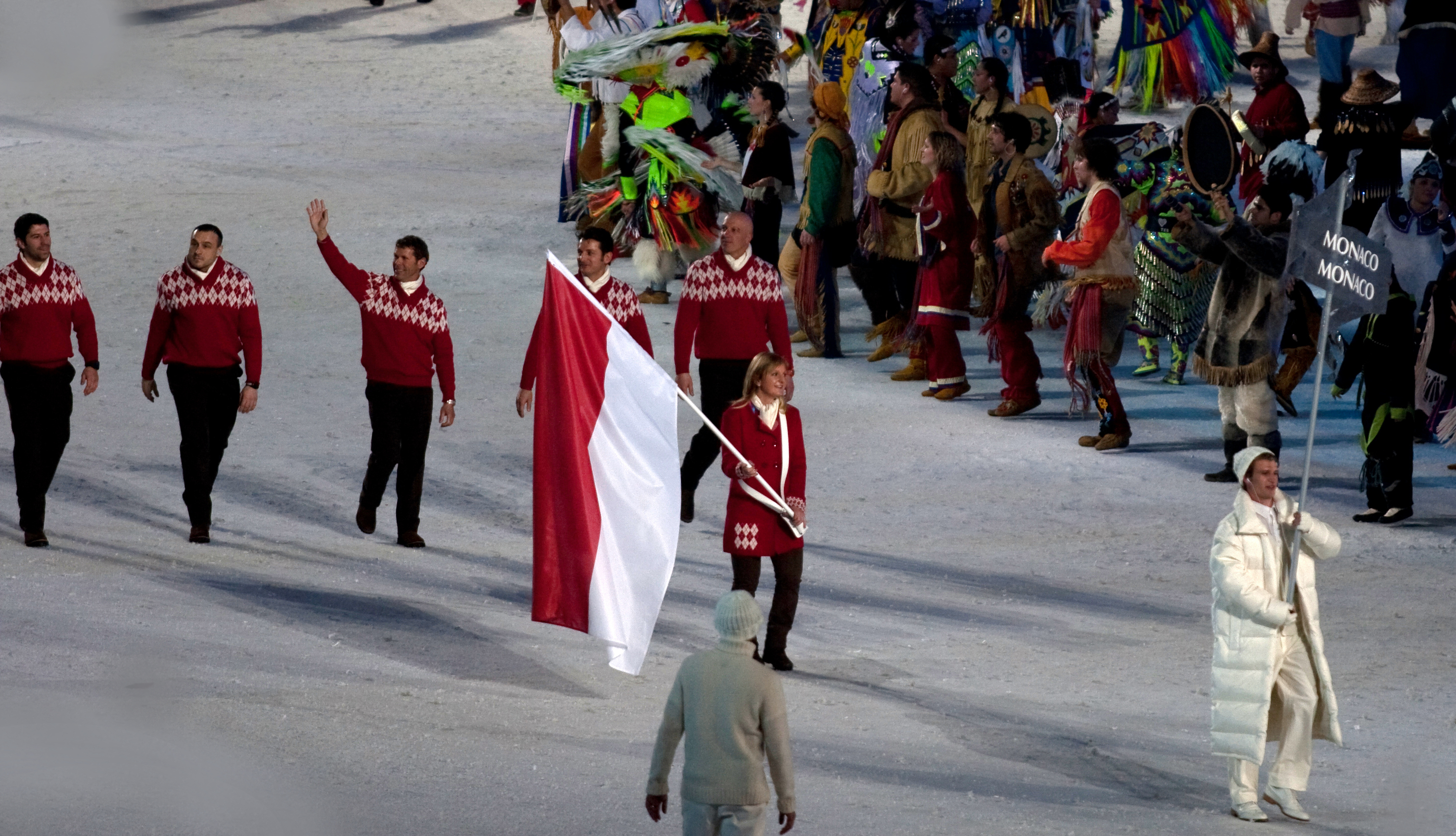
Monaco team with flag at the 2010 Winter Olympics opening ceremony

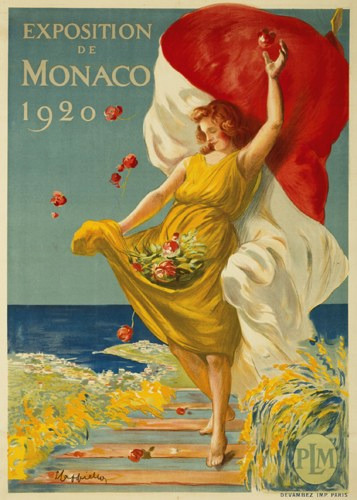
Poster for the Exposition De Monaco (1920)

The national flag of Monaco (French: drapeau national de Monaco) has two equal horizontal bands, of red (top) and white (bottom), both of which have been the heraldic colours of the House of Grimaldi since at least 1339. The present bicolour design was adopted on 4 April 1881, under Charles III.

== Overview ==
Monaco's original flag, which was similar to its current flag princely flag but bore an older version of its coat of arms, was in use from the principality's early days (except during its annexation to the French First Republic from 1793 to 1814) until the present, simpler design was adopted in 1881.

Another design as the banner of the state arms (lozenges in the Grimaldi family colours, in heraldic terms "lozengy argent and gules"), was used at various times, particularly in the 17th century, as an unofficial flag and still appears in some royal photographs. However, it has no designated use and does not represent any Monegasque official in particular.

The flag of Monaco is graphically similar to the flag of Indonesia, with differences in their shades of red and dimension ratios (Monaco's at 4:5 and Indonesia's at 2:3). The flag of Poland is also similar to that of Monaco, but with the colours reversed – white on top and red on the bottom. The flag of Singapore also has a similar design and colour, with the exception being a crescent with five stars at the upper left side.

== Unicode ==
The flag of Monaco is represented as the Unicode emoji sequence U+1F1F2 🇲 REGIONAL INDICATOR SYMBOL LETTER M and U+1F1E8 🇨 REGIONAL INDICATOR SYMBOL LETTER C: 🇲🇨.

== Princely flag ==
Monaco's princely flag (or government flag) consists of the full achievement of the coat of arms on a white background. It is flown at the Prince's palace, government offices, in the presence of government officials, and as an ensign on the Prince's yacht.

== Personal standard of Albert II ==
The personal standard of Prince Albert II consists of the Crown of Monaco over two opposing letters A, on a white background. It is only used in his immediate presence, particularly on cars in which he travels. It is often seen with a gold fringe on the top, bottom and right, which is one-ninth the height of the white field.

Personal standard of Albert II

== See also ==
- List of Monégasque flags

== Notes ==
1. Sources disagree as to the flag's usage. According to Flags of the World, it is; according to the World Flag Database, it is; and according to Whitney Smith's Flags Through the Ages and Across the World (1975), it is.
