= Monaco at the 2011 World Aquatics Championships =

Sporting event delegation

Flag of Monaco

Monaco competed at the 2011 World Aquatics Championships in Shanghai, China between July 16 and 31, 2011.

== Swimming ==
Monaco qualified 2 swimmers.

Women

Athlete	Event	Heats		Semifinals		Final	
Athlete	Event	Time	Rank	Time	Rank	Time	Rank
Amelie Trinquier	Women's 50m Freestyle	29.94	60	did not advance			
Amelie Trinquier	Women's 100m Freestyle	1:04.08	62	did not advance			
Angelique Trinquier	Women's 50m Backstroke	33.19	52	did not advance			
Angelique Trinquier	Women's 100m Backstroke	1:11.38	53	did not advance			
