= Marathon swimming at the 2024 Summer Olympics – Qualification =

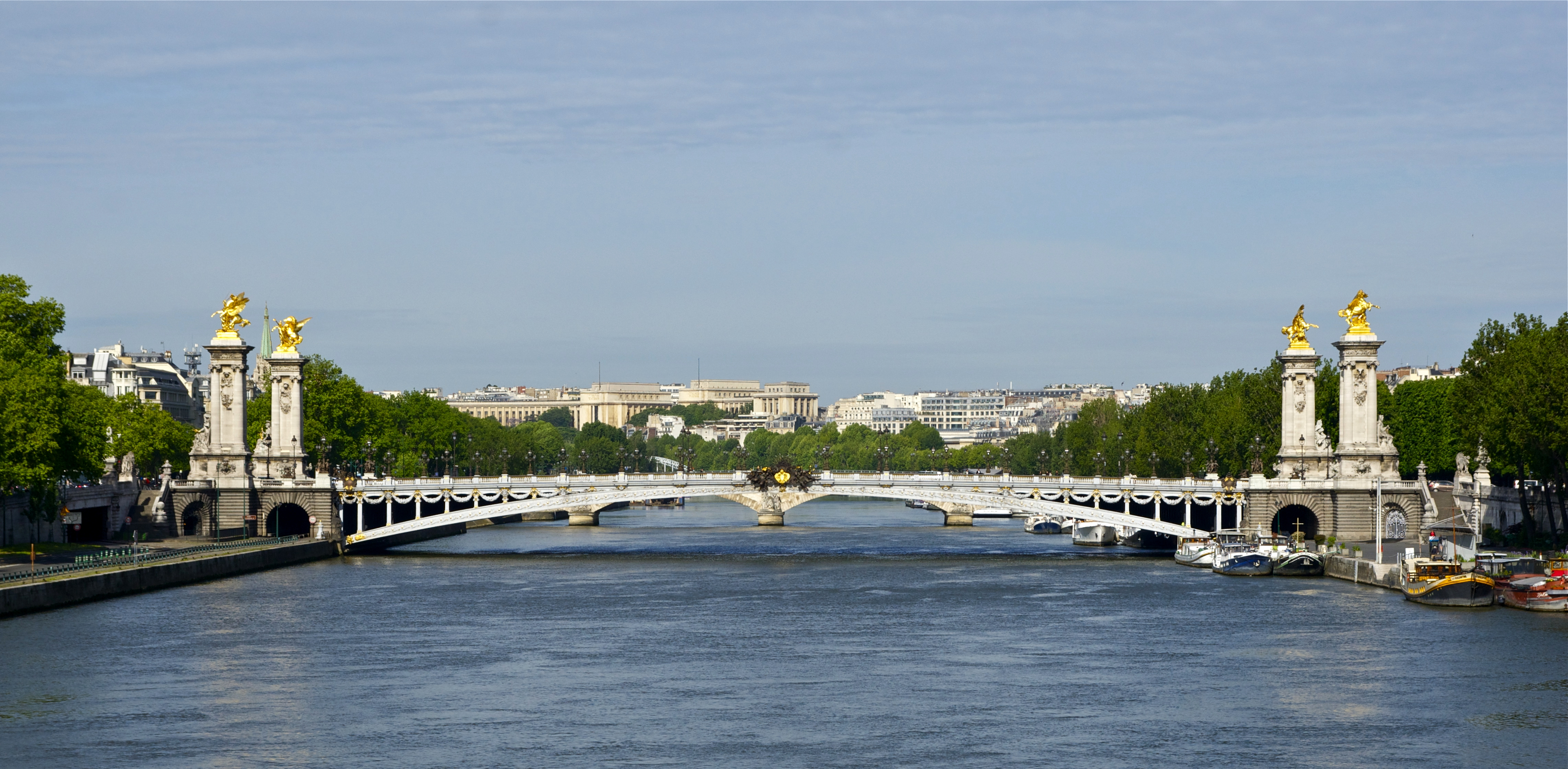
The Pont Alexandre III after which was used for the marathon swimming events

The qualifying phase for marathon swimming at the 2024 Summer Olympics occurred between 1 March 2023 and 23 June 2024. 57 athletes qualified for the 10-kilometre open water marathon swims.

The individual qualifiers for the marathon swimming events qualified through their performances at the 2023 or 2024 World Championships.

== Qualification process ==
Each National Olympic Committee (NOC) was permitted to enter a maximum of two qualified athletes per event. World Aquatics provided a qualification pathway to fulfil their quota of at least 22 competing athletes. Athletes were selected in the following order:

- The three medalists in the 10 km races at the 2023 World Aquatics Championships
- The top thirteen swimmers in the 10 km races at the 2024 World Aquatics Championships
- One representative from each World Aquatics continent (Africa, the Americas, Asia, Europe, and Oceania) (Note: If a continental place was not used, the slot was reallocated to the fastest unqualified swimmer at the 2024 World Aquatics Championships.)
- One representative from the host nation (France) if not qualified by other means (Note: If a French swimmer already qualified, their slot was reallocated to the fastest unqualified swimmer at the 2024 World Aquatics Championships.)

In addition to the athletes invited to fulfil the quota, any athletes who achieved the Olympic Qualification Time in either the 800 or 1500 metres freestyle were invited to compete.

Qualifying competitions
Event	Date	Venue
2023 World Aquatics Championships	15–20 July 2023	(Japan) Fukuoka
2024 World Aquatics Championships	3–8 February 2024	(Qatar) Doha

== Qualified athletes ==
In total, 54 athletes qualified for the open water events. They are listed below, ordered from fastest qualifying time to slowest.

=== Men's 10 km open water ===
Qualifiers for the men's 10 km open water
Qualification event	No. of athletes	NOC	Qualified swimmers
2023 World Championships	2	Germany	Oliver Klemet; Florian Wellbrock
2023 World Championships	1	Hungary	Kristóf Rasovszky
2024 World Championships	2	France	Logan Fontaine; Marc-Antoine Olivier
2024 World Championships	2	Great Britain	Hector Pardoe; Toby Robinson
2024 World Championships	2	Australia	Kyle Lee; Nicholas Sloman
2024 World Championships	2	Italy	Domenico Acerenza; Gregorio Paltrinieri
2024 World Championships	1	Hungary	Dávid Betlehem
2024 World Championships	1	Israel	Matan Roditi
2024 World Championships	1	Ecuador	David Farinango
2024 World Championships	1	Greece	Athanasios Kynigakis
2024 World Championships	1	United States	Ivan Puskovitch
2024 World Championships	1	Austria	Jan Hercog (Note: Unused continental quota place)
2024 World Championships	1	Poland	Piotr Woźniak (Note: Unused host quota place)
2024 World Championships – Africa	1	Namibia	Phillip Seidler
2024 World Championships – Americas	1	Mexico	Paulo Strehlke
2024 World Championships – Asia	1	Japan	Taishin Minamide
2024 World Championships – Europe	1	Czech Republic	Martin Straka
800/1500m OQT	2	Turkey	Emir Batur Albayrak; Kuzey Tunçelli
800/1500m OQT	1	Austria	Felix Auböck
800/1500m OQT	1	Brazil	Guilherme Costa
800/1500m OQT	1	Ireland	Daniel Wiffen
800/1500m OQT	1	United States	David Johnston
800/1500m OQT	1	Spain	Carlos Garach Benito
800/1500m OQT	1	South Korea	Kim Woo-min
800/1500m OQT	1	Norway	Henrik Christiansen
800/1500m OQT	1	Sweden	Victor Johansson
800/1500m OQT	1	Tunisia	Ahmed Jaouadi
Total	33		

=== Women's 10 km open water ===
Qualifiers for the women's 10 km open water
Qualification event	No. of athletes	NOC	Qualified swimmers
2023 World Championships	1	Germany	Leonie Beck
2023 World Championships	1	Australia	Chelsea Gubecka
2023 World Championships	1	United States	Katie Grimes
2024 World Championships	2	Spain	María de Valdés; Angela Martínez
2024 World Championships	2	Brazil	Ana Marcela Cunha; Viviane Jungblut
2024 World Championships	2	France	Océane Cassignol; Caroline Jouisse
2024 World Championships	1	Netherlands	Sharon van Rouwendaal
2024 World Championships	1	Portugal	Angélica André
2024 World Championships	1	Australia	Moesha Johnson
2024 World Championships	1	United States	Mariah Denigan
2024 World Championships	1	Italy	Giulia Gabbrielleschi
2024 World Championships	1	Monaco	Lisa Pou
2024 World Championships	1	Japan	Airi Ebina
2024 World Championships	1	Hungary	Bettina Fábián
2024 World Championships	1	Canada	Emma Finlin
2024 World Championships	1	Peru	María Bramont-Arias
2024 World Championships – Americas	1	Mexico	Martha Sandoval
2024 World Championships – Asia	1	China	Xin Xin
2024 World Championships – Europe	1	Great Britain	Leah Crisp
800/1500m OQT	1	Germany	Leonie Martens
800/1500m OQT	1	Italy	Ginevra Taddeucci
Total	24		
