= Open water swimming at the 2025 World Aquatics Championships – Women's 5 km =

Women's 5 km at the 2025 World Aquatics Championships
- Venue: Sentosa Island
- Location: Singapore
- Dates: 18 July
- Competitors: 77 from 50 nations
- Winning time: 1:02:01.3

Medalists
| gold medal | Moesha Johnson | Australia |
| silver medal | Ginevra Taddeucci | Italy |
| bronze medal | Ichika Kajimoto | Japan |

The women's 5 km competition at the 2025 World Aquatics Championships was held on 18 July 2025. The race consisted of three laps of a course off the coast of Palawan Beach, Sentosa.

Australia's Moesha Johnson was leading the race by the first turn, and she extended her lead so that by the end of the first lap she was three seconds ahead of Italian Ginevra Taddeucci in second. At the start of the final lap, Johnson and Taddeucci had a large lead on the chasing pack. Over the final straight, Taddeucci challenged Johnson for the lead, but Johnson sped up to win with a time of 1:02:01.3. Taddeucci finished second with 1:02:02.3, and Japan's Ichika Kajimoto beat out the rest of the chasing pack to win bronze with 1:02:28.9.

Johnson's victory earned her a second gold of the Championships, as she also won the 10 km event earlier in the programme. Kajimoto's bronze made her the first Japanese medallist in an open water event at a world championship.

== Background ==
Australia's Moesha Johnson, Italy's Ginevra Taddeucci and Monaco's Lisa Pou were returning to the open water after medalling in the 10 km event earlier in the Championships. The gold and silver medallists from the previous two editions of this event were not competing, while Ana Marcela Cunha, the bronze medallist from 2023 and 2024, was competing. European Aquatics wrote that most of the swimmers in this race "will be looking to either avenge their earlier performance or build on their success" from the 10 km.

== Qualification ==
Each World Aquatics member federation could enter up to two athletes.

== Race ==
The race consisted of three laps of a course off the coast of Palawan Beach, Sentosa. It was held on 18 July at 07:30 SGT. Unlike in most 5 km open water races, athletes were allowed to feed during the race to stay hydrated in the warm water.

After Neutral Athlete Ekaterina Sorokina led for the early part of the race, Moesha Johnson took the lead at the first turn. Johnson extended her lead, and by the end of the first lap she was three seconds ahead of Ginevra Taddeucci in second. Taddeucci was in turn three seconds ahead of Hungary's Viktória Mihályvári-Farkas and Spain's María de Valdés, who had also built up a lead on the chasing pack, led by Lisa Pou. Over the second lap this chasing pack caught up with Mihályvári-Farkas and De Valdés.

Entering the third lap, Johnson and Taddeucci had a large lead on the chasing pack. SwimSwam wrote that there was "a race for gold and a race for bronze". Mihályvári-Farkas was in third place, leading the chasing pack. Over the third lap, Taddeucci closed the gap on Johnson and swam close behind her, meanwhile Japan's Ichika Kajimoto pulled to the front of the chasing pack.

Over the final straight, Taddeucci challenged Johnson for the lead, but Johnson sped up to win with a time of 1:02:01.3. Taddeucci finished second with 1:02:02.3, and Kajimoto finished third with 1:02:28.9. ABC News and The Straits Times both called it a "thrilling" end to the race. Describing it, Johnson said: "At the end, there's not always a lot of skill. When you're tired, it comes down to just pure fight. And I wanted that win. I wanted that back-to-back (gold) today."

Johnson's victory earned her a second gold of the Championships, since she won the 10 km event earlier in the programme, and it was Taddeucci's second silver, as she placed second in the 10 km. Kajimoto's bronze made her the first Japanese medallist in an open water event at a world championship. It was also the first time this event did not feature Ana Marcela Cunha on the podium since 2015. It was Johnson's third world championship gold medal.

The water was warm—reported to be 30.2 °C (86.4 °F)—and the air was warm and humid. After the race, Johnson said: "They were saying this is the hottest World Aquatics Championships ever. That wasn't easy at all. It wasn't just hot." CNA reported that the conditions were better than in the 10 km race.

Results
| Rank | Swimmer | Nationality | Time |
|---|---|---|---|
| 1st place, gold medalist(s) | Moesha Johnson | Australia | 1:02:01.3 |
| 2nd place, silver medalist(s) | Ginevra Taddeucci | Italy | 1:02:02.3 |
| 3rd place, bronze medalist(s) | Ichika Kajimoto | Japan | 1:02:28.9 |
| 4 | María de Valdés | Spain | 1:02:33.1 |
| 5 | Celine Rieder | Germany | 1:02:34.1 |
| 6 | Lisa Pou | Monaco | 1:02:36.3 |
| 7 | Viktória Mihályvári-Farkas | Hungary | 1:02:39.4 |
| 8 | Ana Marcela Cunha | Brazil | 1:03:10.2 |
| 9 | Inès Delacroix | France | 1:03:10.5 |
| 10 | Giulia Gabbrielleschi | Italy | 1:03:40.0 |
| 11 | Bettina Fábián | Hungary | 1:03:53.5 |
| 12 | Caroline Jouisse | France | 1:04:06.5 |
| 13 | Mariah Denigan | United States | 1:04:08.6 |
| 14 | Ekaterina Sorokina | Neutral Athletes B | 1:04:09.7 |
| 15 | Tian Muran | China | 1:04:10.9 |
| 16 | Callan Lotter | South Africa | 1:04:21.6 |
| 17 | Paula Otero | Spain | 1:04:28.7 |
| 18 | Julie Pleskotová | Czech Republic | 1:04:35.3 |
| 19 | Emma Finlin | Canada | 1:04:37.2 |
| 20 | Tayla Martin | Australia | 1:04:37.4 |
| 21 | Viviane Jungblut | Brazil | 1:04:56.7 |
| 22 | Brinkleigh Hansen | United States | 1:05:00.6 |
| 23 | Mafalda Rosa | Portugal | 1:05:00.6 |
| 24 | Polina Koziakina | Neutral Athletes B | 1:05:24.0 |
| 25 | Klaudia Tarasiewicz | Poland | 1:06:05.4 |
| 26 | Louna Kasvio | Finland | 1:06:25.3 |
| 27 | Su İnal | Turkey | 1:06:26.0 |
| 28 | Georgia Makri | Greece | 1:06:28.9 |
| 29 | Alena Benešová | Czech Republic | 1:06:31.0 |
| 30 | Candela Giordanino | Argentina | 1:06:32.3 |
| 31 | Lin Jia-shien | Chinese Taipei | 1:06:34.2 |
| 32 | Cheng Hanyu | China | 1:06:34.3 |
| 33 | Danna Martínez | Ecuador | 1:06:35.9 |
| 34 | Malak Meqdar | Morocco | 1:06:49.3 |
| 35 | Catherine Van Rensburg | South Africa | 1:06:50.4 |
| 36 | Špela Perše | Slovenia | 1:08:34.9 |
| 37 | Leonie Tenzer | Finland | 1:08:36.2 |
| 38 | Ana Abad | Ecuador | 1:08:49.9 |
| 39 | Klara Bošnjak | Croatia | 1:08:55.6 |
| 40 | Nip Tsz Yin | Hong Kong | 1:08:58.0 |
| 41 | Paulina Alanís | Mexico | 1:09:50.5 |
| 42 | Wang Yi-chen | Chinese Taipei | 1:09:53.0 |
| 43 | Kate Ona | Singapore | 1:09:53.9 |
| 44 | Nathalie Medina | Venezuela | 1:09:54.4 |
| 45 | Yanci Vanegas | Guatemala | 1:09:55.6 |
| 46 | Pilar Cañedo | Uruguay | 1:09:57.8 |
| 47 | Kim Sue-ah | South Korea | 1:11:15.8 |
| 48 | Hwang Ji-yeon | South Korea | 1:11:42.7 |
| 49 | Chonpasanop Chatwuti | Thailand | 1:11:42.7 |
| 50 | Daniela Suárez | Venezuela | 1:11:42.8 |
| 51 | Saida Yelemes | Kazakhstan | 1:11:47.1 |
| 52 | Izzy Dwifaiva Hefrisyanthi | Indonesia | 1:11:50.4 |
| 53 | Nikita Lam | Hong Kong | 1:12:10.4 |
| 54 | María Porres | Guatemala | 1:12:27.4 |
| 55 | Alondra Quiles | Puerto Rico | 1:12:31.5 |
| 56 | Isabella Hernández | Dominican Republic | 1:12:35.6 |
| 57 | Sara Martínez | Mexico | 1:13:23.1 |
| 58 | Alexandra Mejía | Andorra | 1:13:36.6 |
| 59 | María Fernanda Arellanos | Peru | 1:13:46.0 |
| 60 | Muse Goh | Singapore | 1:13:57.4 |
| 61 | Minagi Rupesinghe | Sri Lanka | 1:14:03.2 |
| 62 | Cielo Peralta | Paraguay | 1:15:09.6 |
| 63 | Christina Durán | Dominican Republic | 1:15:31.4 |
| 64 | Dayana Meléndez | El Salvador | 1:15:31.5 |
| 65 | Reza Westerduin | Namibia | 1:15:42.6 |
| 66 | Ayazhan Ainabekova | Kazakhstan | 1:16:07.8 |
| 67 | Meenakshi Gopakumar Menon | India | 1:16:42.4 |
| 68 | Madison Bergh | Namibia | 1:16:56.2 |
| — | Selinnur Sade | Turkey | OTL |
| — | Desak Nyo Pradnyaswari Dewi | Indonesia | OTL |
| — | Micheline Bathfield | Mauritius | OTL |
| — | Purva Sandip Gawade | India | OTL |
| — | Loreley Daleney | Bolivia | DNF |
| — | Victoria Okumu | Kenya | DNF |
| — | Maria Bianchi | Kenya | DNF |
| — | Ana Domingues | Mozambique | DNF |
| — | Swagiah Mubiru | Uganda | DNF |
| — | Jeannette Spiwoks | Germany | DNS |

== Further information ==
- "World Aquatics Championships: Conditions in 5 km Race Much Better Compared to Jul 16's 10 km Starts" (Video). CNA. 18 July 2025 – via YouTube. – Report on the conditions during the race and an interview with Singapore's Kate Ona
- Ross, Andy (18 July 2025). "Moesha Johnson Holds off Taddeucci Once More in the 5 km". World Aquatics. Archived from the original on 19 July 2025. – Quotes from the medallists
- "Germany's Wellbrock Completes Open Water Golden Double at Singapore Worlds". english.news.cn. Xinhuanet. 18 July 2025. Archived from the original on 12 October 2025. – Gallery containing images of the race
