= Open water swimming at the 2024 European Aquatics Championships – Women's 10 km =

Women's 10 km at the 2024 European Aquatics Championships
- Venue: Ada Ciganlija
- Dates: 12 June
- Competitors: 26 from 15 nations
- Winning time: 2:00:54.8

Medalists
| gold medal | Leonie Beck | Germany |
| silver medal | Barbara Pozzobon | Italy |
| bronze medal | Giulia Gabbrielleschi | Italy |

The Women's 10 km competition at the 2024 European Aquatics Championships was held on 12 June.

== Results ==
The race was started at 09:00.

| Rank | Swimmer | Nationality | Time |
|---|---|---|---|
| 1st place, gold medalist(s) | Leonie Beck | Germany | 2:00:54.8 |
| 2nd place, silver medalist(s) | Barbara Pozzobon | Italy | 2:00:54.9 |
| 3rd place, bronze medalist(s) | Giulia Gabbrielleschi | Italy | 2:00:58.5 |
| 4 | Ángela Martínez | Spain | 2:01:01.4 |
| 5 | Bettina Fábián | Hungary | 2:01:03.9 |
| 6 | Lisa Pou | Monaco | 2:01:06.0 |
| 7 | Mira Szimcsák | Hungary | 2:01:14.0 |
| 8 | María de Valdés | Spain | 2:01:22.2 |
| 9 | Caroline Jouisse | France | 2:01:24.2 |
| 10 | Lea Boy | Germany | 2:01:24.5 |
| 11 | Jeannette Spiwoks | Germany | 2:01:24.9 |
| 12 | Mafalda Rosa | Portugal | 2:01:29.9 |
| 13 | Leah Crisp | Great Britain | 2:01:39.1 |
| 14 | Eva Fabian | Israel | 2:01:40.5 |
| 15 | Špela Perše | Slovenia | 2:01:50.8 |
| 16 | Veronica Santoni | Italy | 2:01:58.8 |
| 17 | Klaudia Tarasiewicz | Poland | 2:02:22.1 |
| 18 | Anna Olasz | Hungary | 2:03:31.2 |
| 19 | Candela Sánchez | Spain | 2:04:59.1 |
| 20 | Louna Kasvio | Finland | 2:05:14.7 |
| 21 | Leonie-Sarah Tenzer | Finland | 2:06:19.1 |
| 22 | Julie Pleskotová | Czech Republic | 2:07:34.5 |
| 23 | Ofek Adir | Israel | 2:10:44.1 |
| 24 | Eden Girloanta | Israel | 2:10:44.2 |
| 25 | Maša Cvetković | Serbia | 2:16:46.2 |
| 26 | Hana Krasnohorská | Slovakia | 2:25:18.3 |
