= Open water swimming at the 2024 European Aquatics Championships – Women's 5 km =

Women's 5 km at the 2024 European Aquatics Championships
- Venue: Ada Ciganlija
- Dates: 13 June
- Competitors: 19 from 13 nations
- Winning time: 58:25.3

Medalists
gold medal	Leonie Beck	Germany
silver medal	Ginevra Taddeucci	Italy
bronze medal	Bettina Fábián	Hungary

The Women's 5 km competition at the 2024 European Aquatics Championships was held on 13 June.

== Results ==
The race was started at 12:00.

Rank	Swimmer	Nationality	Time
1st place, gold medalist(s)	Leonie Beck	Germany	58:25.3
2nd place, silver medalist(s)	Ginevra Taddeucci	Italy	58:26.5
3rd place, bronze medalist(s)	Bettina Fábián	Hungary	58:28.7
4	María de Valdés	Spain	58:29.0
5	Lisa Pou	Monaco	58:31.3
6	Ángela Martínez	Spain	58:34.7
7	Celine Rieder	Germany	58:38.6
8	Mira Szimcsák	Hungary	58:39.9
9	Caroline Jouisse	France	58:40.2
10	Eva Fabian	Israel	58:42.2
11	Rachele Bruni	Italy	58:55.0
12	Jeannette Spiwoks	Germany	58:56.5
13	Špela Perše	Slovenia	58:58.5
14	Klaudia Tarasiewicz	Poland	59:29.3
15	Julie Pleskotová	Czech Republic	59:33.9
16	Mafalda Rosa	Portugal	1:00:32.8
17	Océane Cassignol	France	1:01:04.5
18	Maša Cvetković	Serbia	1:06:06.3
19	Natália Špániková	Slovakia	1:06:17.8
	Anna Olasz	Hungary	DNS
