= Open water swimming at the 2026 European Aquatics Championships – Women's 3 km knockout sprint =

Women's 3 km knockout sprint at the 2026 European Aquatics Championships
- Venue: River Seine
- Dates: 7 August
- Competitors: 31 from 17 nations
- Winning time: 6:41.09

Medalists
gold medal	Isabel Gose	Germany
silver medal	Bettina Fábián	Hungary
bronze medal	Ginevra Taddeucci	Italy

The Women's 3 km knockout sprint competition at the 2026 European Aquatics Championships was held on 7 August 2026.

== Results ==
=== Round 1 ===
The first round was started at 09:00.

Heat 1

Rank	Swimmer	Nationality	Time	Notes
1	Linda Caponi	Italy	17:14.64	Q
2	Inès Delacroix	France	17:16.13	Q
3	Klaudia Tarasiewicz	Poland	17:17.23	Q
4	Bettina Fábián	Hungary	17:18.30	Q
5	Paula Otero	Spain	17:18.32	Q
6	Polina Koziakina	Neutral Athletes B	17:18.38	Q
7	Clara Martínez	Spain	17:19.36	Q
8	Caroline Jouisse	France	17:20.06	Q
9	Ofek Adir	Israel	17:20.23	Q
10	Julie Pleskotová	Czechia	17:20.68	Q
11	Aleksandra Khailova	Neutral Athletes B	17:20.79	
12	Špela Perše	Slovenia	17:26.69	
13	Kirke Mõtsnik	Estonia	17:51.08	
14	Rebeka Androvic	Israel	18:11.54	
15	Gökçe Öztürk	Turkey	18:24.40	
16	Lucia Slámová	Slovakia	18:48.39	

Heat 2

Rank	Swimmer	Nationality	Time	Notes
1	Isabel Gose	Germany	16:51.51	Q
2	Ginevra Taddeucci	Italy	16:54.66	Q
3	Lou-Ann Gaudaire	France	16:55.07	Q
4	Ekaterina Sorokina	Neutral Athletes B	16:55.40	Q
5	Candela Sánchez	Spain	16:55.96	Q
6	Louna Kasvio	Finland	16:56.57	Q
7	Lisa Pou	Monaco	16:57.60	Q
8	Rebecca Rimoldi	Italy	16:58.81	Q
9	Georgia Makri	Greece	17:21.08	Q
10	Su İnal	Turkey	17:21.61	Q
11	Tuna Erdoğan	Turkey	17:25.06	
12	Hedwig Bolt	Netherlands	17:28.60	
13	Emily Golos	Israel	17:36.42	
14	Alena Benešová	Czechia	17:39.99	
15	Evalotta Aabrams	Estonia	18:58.75	
	Mafalda Rosa	Portugal	Did not start	

=== Round 2 ===
The second round was started at 09:50.

Semifinal 1

Rank	Swimmer	Nationality	Time	Notes
1	Inès Delacroix	France	11:58.48	Q
1	Bettina Fábián	Hungary	11:58.48	Q
3	Klaudia Tarasiewicz	Poland	11:58.58	Q
4	Caroline Jouisse	France	11:58.63	Q
5	Paula Otero	Spain	11:59.68	Q
6	Polina Koziakina	Neutral Athletes B	12:00.01	
7	Linda Caponi	Italy	12:00.77	
8	Clara Martínez	Spain	12:07.75	
9	Julie Pleskotová	Czechia	12:14.79	
10	Ofek Adir	Israel	12:14.99	

Semifinal 2

Rank	Swimmer	Nationality	Time	Notes
1	Isabel Gose	Germany	11:46.30	Q
2	Ginevra Taddeucci	Italy	11:47.37	Q
3	Lou-Ann Gaudaire	France	11:47.99	Q
4	Ekaterina Sorokina	Neutral Athletes B	11:49.32	Q
5	Candela Sánchez	Spain	11:49.87	Q
6	Lisa Pou	Monaco	11:49.88	
7	Louna Kasvio	Finland	11:53.20	
8	Rebecca Rimoldi	Italy	11:53.78	
9	Su İnal	Turkey	12:23.88	
10	Georgia Makri	Greece	12:25.94	

=== Round 3 ===
The third round was started at 10:22.

Rank	Swimmer	Nationality	Time
1st place, gold medalist(s)	Isabel Gose	Germany	6:41.09
2nd place, silver medalist(s)	Bettina Fábián	Hungary	6:44.19
3rd place, bronze medalist(s)	Ginevra Taddeucci	Italy	6:44.86
4	Inès Delacroix	France	6:48.21
5	Ekaterina Sorokina	Neutral Athletes B	6:52.22
6	Lou-Ann Gaudaire	France	6:53.80
7	Paula Otero	Spain	6:55.91
8	Klaudia Tarasiewicz	Poland	6:55.96
9	Candela Sánchez	Spain	7:01.42
10	Caroline Jouisse	France	7:05.99
