= Slovenia at the 2025 World Aquatics Championships =

- Flag of Slovenia
- World Aquatics code: SLO
- National federation: Slovenian Swimming Association

in Singapore
- Competitors: 3 in 2 sports
- Medals: Gold 0 Silver 0 Bronze 0 Total 0

World Aquatics Championships appearances
- 1994; 1998; 2001; 2003; 2005; 2007; 2009; 2011; 2013; 2015; 2017; 2019; 2022; 2023; 2024; 2025

Other related appearances
- Yugoslavia (1973–1991)

Slovenia competed at the 2025 World Aquatics Championships in Singapore from 11 July to 3 August 2025.

== Competitors ==
The following is the list of competitors in the Championships.

Sport	Men	Women	Total
Open Water	0	1	1
Swimming	1	1	2
Total	1	2	3

== Open water ==
Women

Athlete	Event	Heat		Semi-final		Final	
Athlete	Event	Time	Rank	Time	Rank	Time	Rank
Špela Perše	Women's 3 km knockout sprints	18:39.3	14	Did not advance			
Špela Perše	Women's 5 km	—				1:08:34.9	36
Špela Perše	Women's 10 km	—				2:09:27.8	29

== Swimming ==
Men

Athlete	Event	Heat		Semi-final		Final	
Athlete	Event	Time	Rank	Time	Rank	Time	Rank
Sašo Boškan	200 m freestyle	1:49.47	38	Did not advance			
Sašo Boškan	400 m freestyle	3:49.86	26	—		Did not advance	

Women

Athlete	Event	Heat		Semi-final		Final	
Athlete	Event	Time	Rank	Time	Rank	Time	Rank
Janja Šegel	100 m freestyle	55.71	33	Did not advance			
Janja Šegel	200 m freestyle	2:01.18	32	Did not advance			
Janja Šegel	100 m backstroke	1:04.10	38				
