= Open water swimming at the 2024 World Aquatics Championships – Mixed 4 × 1500 metre relay =

Mixed 4 × 1500 metre open water relay at the 2024 World Aquatics Championships
- Venue: Doha Port
- Location: Doha, Qatar
- Dates: 8 February
- Competitors: 84 from 21 nations
- Teams: 21
- Winning time: 1:03:28.0

Medalists
gold medal	Moesha Johnson; Chelsea Gubecka; Nicholas Sloman; Kyle Lee	Australia
silver medal	Giulia Gabbrielleschi; Arianna Bridi; Gregorio Paltrinieri; Domenico Acerenza	Italy
bronze medal	Bettina Fábián; Mira Szimcsák; Dávid Betlehem; Kristóf Rasovszky	Hungary

The mixed 4 × 1500 metre relay event at the 2024 World Aquatics Championships was held on 8 February 2024 at Doha Port in Doha, Qatar.

The teams that led with male swimmers led for the early portions of the race. At the final changeover, Italy was leading followed by Australia. Over the final leg, Australia's Kyle Lee and Italy's Domenico Acerenza raced each other for the win. Acerenza was in the lead going into the final straight, but Lee caught up and drew level near the finish.

Australia won with a time of 1:03:28.0, 0.2 seconds ahead of Italy who finished second with 1:03:28.2. Kristóf Rasovszky finished third for Hungary with a time of 1:04:06.8. It was the first time since 2011 that the open water team event at the Championships had been won by a non-European team, and it was the first time Australia had claimed the title.

== Event description ==
Each athlete swam 1500 m. The teams consisted of two men and two women, meaning each team completed 6 km in total. The men and women could swim in any order through the relay.

== Qualification ==
Each World Aquatics member federation could enter one team.

== Race ==
The race took place at 10:30 AST on 8 February at Doha Port in Doha, Qatar.

The teams that led with male swimmers – including China, South Korea, and Turkey – formed the leading group during the early stages of the race. Over the third leg, Italy and Australia created a gap between themselves and the rest of the field. Australia's Nicholas Sloman was leading halfway through the third leg, before Italy's Gregorio Paltrinieri overtook him to make Italy the first team to reach the final changeover. Australia's Kyle Lee and Italy's Domenico Acerenza raced each other over the final leg; Liz Byrnes from Swimming World wrote that they were having their own "private battle" for the gold. Acerenza was in the lead going into the final straight, but Lee caught up and drew level near the finish. Australia won with a time of 1:03:28.0, 0.2 seconds ahead of Italy, who finished second with 1:03:28.2. Hungary's Kristóf Rasovszky overtook Germany and the United States on the final leg to win bronze for his team with a time of 1:04:06.8. Germany finished fourth with 1:04:11.6.

The Guardian called Australia's win "nail-biting" and wrote that Lee's race with Acerenza over the last leg was a "remarkable duel". After the race, Lee said "I just tried to stay calm and it is so hectic in that finishing chute ... I guess I got lucky on the touch." It was the first time since 2011 that the open water team event at the Championships had been won by a non-European team, and it was the first time Australia had claimed the title.

Results
Rank	Nation	Swimmers (Note: Ordered according to the order they swam in)	Time
1st place, gold medalist(s)	Australia	Moesha Johnson; Chelsea Gubecka; Nicholas Sloman; Kyle Lee	1:03:28.0
2nd place, silver medalist(s)	Italy	Giulia Gabbrielleschi; Arianna Bridi; Gregorio Paltrinieri; Domenico Acerenza	1:03:28.2
3rd place, bronze medalist(s)	Hungary	Bettina Fábián; Mira Szimcsák; Dávid Betlehem; Kristóf Rasovszky	1:04:06.8
4	Germany	Leonie Beck; Celine Rieder; Oliver Klemet; Arne Schubert	1:04:11.6
5	United States	Mariah Denigan; Katie Grimes; Charlie Clark; Michael Brinegar	1:04:16.1
6	France	Océane Cassignol; Caroline Jouisse; Marc-Antoine Olivier; Logan Fontaine	1:05:05.5
7	Portugal	Mafalda Rosa; Angélica André; Diogo Cardoso; Tiago Campos	1:05:05.7
8	Brazil	Ana Marcela Cunha; Viviane Jungblut; Pedro Farias; Henrique Figueirinha	1:05:36.2
9	Argentina	Cecilia Biagioli; Candela Giordanino; Lucas Alba; Franco Cassini	1:07:03.2
10	Canada	Emma Finlin; Laila Oravsky; Eric Hedlin; Hau-Li Fan	1:07:03.4
11	China	Liu Peixin; Zhang Jinhou; Mao Yihan; Xin Xin	1:07:17.2
12	Mexico	Martha Sandoval; Santiago Gutiérrez; Paulina Alanís; Paulo Strehlke	1:07:29.5
13	South Korea	Oh Se-beom; Park Jae-hun; Lee Hae-rim; Park Jung-ju	1:07:55.3
14	Czech Republic	Alena Benešová; Lenka Pavlacká; Martin Straka; Matěj Kozubek	1:08:07.1
15	South Africa	Ruan Breytenbach; Callan Lotter; Amica de Jager; Rossouw Venter	1:08:42.0
16	Turkey	Emir Batur Albayrak; Burhanettin Hacı Sağır; Sezen Akanda Boz; Tuna Erdoğan	1:08:42.9
17	Chinese Taipei	Cho Cheng-chi; Teng Yu-wen; Cho Pei-chi; Wang Yi-chen	1:09:37.3
18	Hong Kong	Keith Sin; Nip Tsz Yin; Nikita Lam; William Yan Thorley	1:10:10.3
19	Kazakhstan	Galymzhan Balabek; Diana Taszhanova; Mariya Fedotova; Lev Cherepanov	1:10:44.2
20	Venezuela	Paola Pérez; Ruthseli Aponte; Johndry Segovia; Ronaldo Zambrano	1:10:45.5
21	Slovakia	Tomáš Peciar; Karolína Valko; Lucia Slámová; Richard Urban	1:11:56.6
	Puerto Rico	Christian Bayo; Jamarr Bruno; Alondra Quiles; Mariela Guadamuro	Did not start

== Further information ==
- "Mixed 4x1500m Relays | Open Water | World Aquatics Championships - Doha 2024". World Aquatics. 8 February 2024. Archived from the original on 2 November 2025. – Photo gallery from the event

== Further information on national performances ==
- Arcobelli, Stefano (8 February 2024). "Mondiali, Fondo: Argento Per l'Italia Della Staffetta, Beffata Al Fotofinish". La Gazzetta dello Sport. ISSN 1120-5067. Archived from the original on 8 February 2024. – Further detail on the Italian race and team
- "Rasovszky Kristóf Szenzációs Hajrájával Világbajnoki Bronzérmes Lett A Magyar Ssapat". Origo (in Hungarian). 8 February 2024. OCLC 806226699. Archived from the original on 10 February 2024. – Further detail on the Hungarian race and team
- Radeck, Jule (8 February 2024). "Deutschlands Freiwasser-Team Bleibt Ohne WM-Medaille | Staffel-Quartett Schwimmt Auf Platz Vier". swim.de (in German). Archived from the original on 17 April 2025. – Further detail on the German race and team
- "游泳世锦赛|公开水域——4X1500米混合接力决赛: 中国队获得第11名-新华网". Xinhuanet. 8 February 2024. Archived from the original on 14 June 2025. – Photos of the Chinese team during the race
