= Open water swimming at the 2026 European Aquatics Championships – Women's 10 km =

Women's 10 km at the 2026 European Aquatics Championships
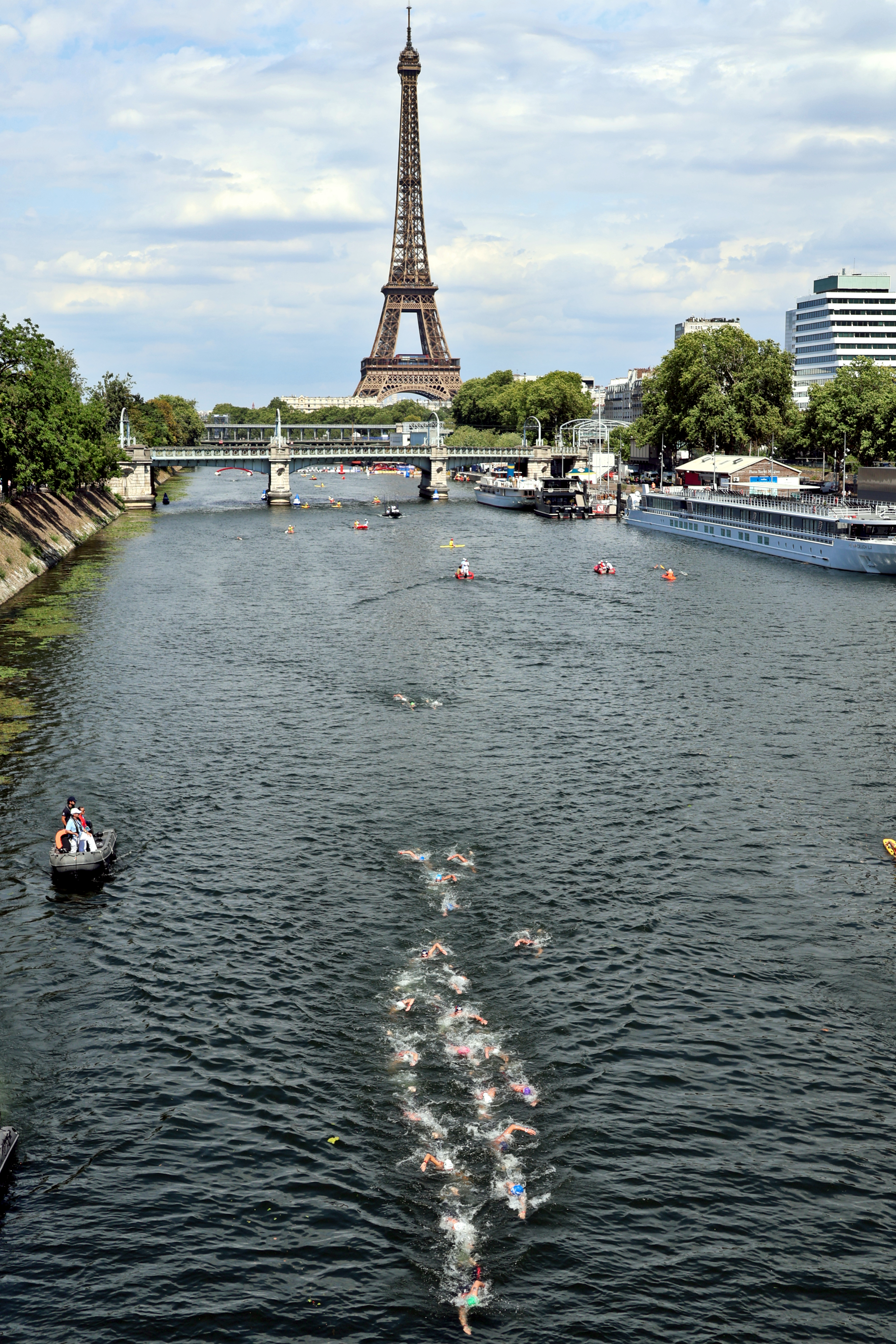
- Venue: River Seine
- Dates: 4 August
- Competitors: 32 from 17 nations
- Winning time: 2:07:49.90

Medalists
gold medal	Ginevra Taddeucci	Italy
silver medal	Viktória Mihályvári-Farkas	Hungary
bronze medal	Linda Caponi	Italy

The Women's 10 km competition at the 2026 European Aquatics Championships was held on 4 August 2026.

== Results ==
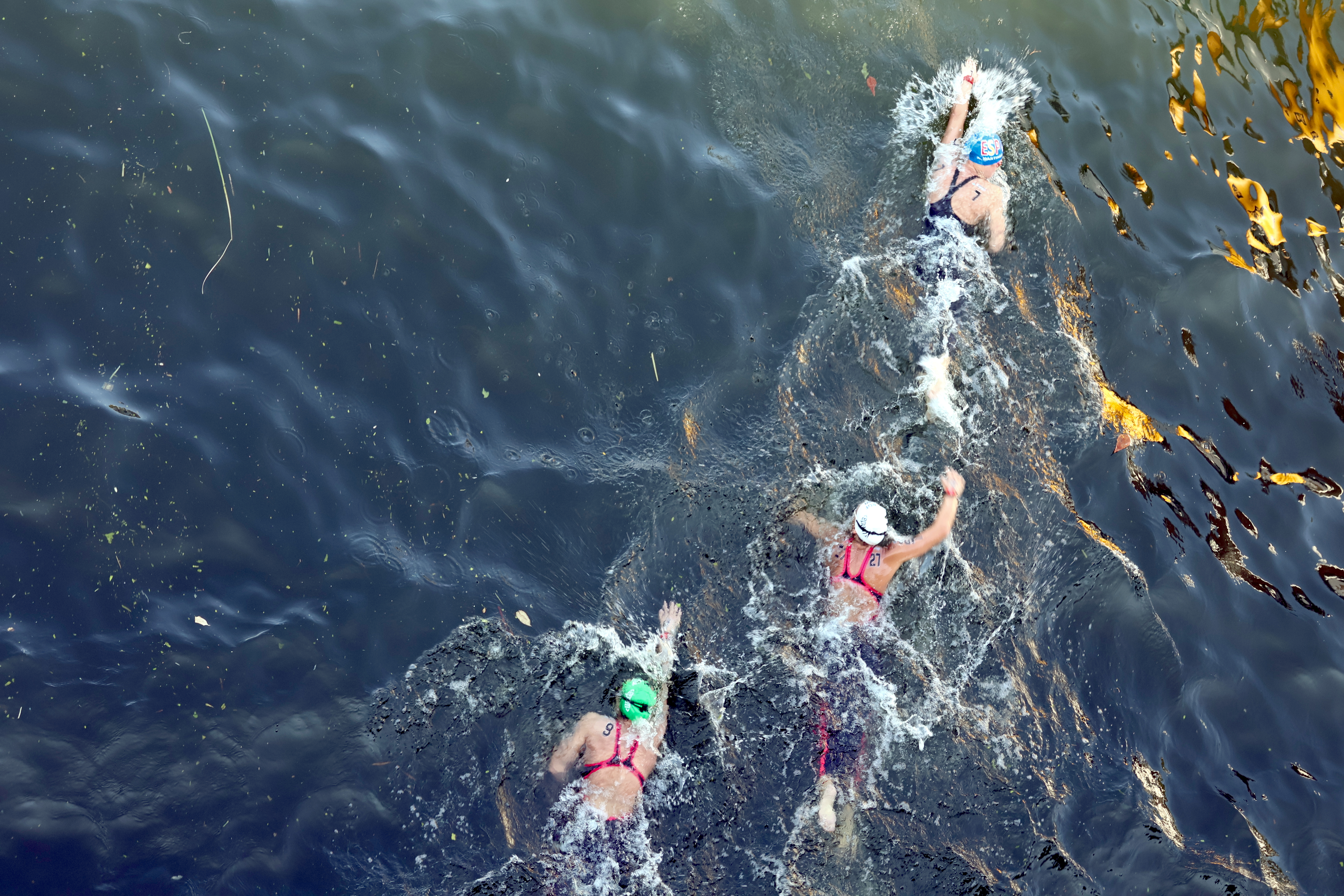
Ángela Martínez (7), Ginevra Taddeucci (27) and Viktória Mihályvári-Farkas (9).

The race was started at 14:30.

Rank	Swimmer	Nationality	Time
1st place, gold medalist(s)	Ginevra Taddeucci	Italy	2:07:49.90
2nd place, silver medalist(s)	Viktória Mihályvári-Farkas	Hungary	2:07:59.61
3rd place, bronze medalist(s)	Linda Caponi	Italy	2:08:03.48
4	Klaudia Tarasiewicz	Poland	2:08:06.93
5	Ángela Martínez	Spain	2:08:11.45
6	Ekaterina Sorokina	Neutral Athletes B	2:08:15.63
6	Lisa Pou	Monaco	2:08:15.63
8	Louna Kasvio	Finland	2:08:15.69
9	Iana Kurtseva	Neutral Athletes B	2:08:16.76
10	Polina Koziakina	Neutral Athletes B	2:08:39.49
11	Angélica André	Portugal	2:08:41.77
12	Špela Perše	Slovenia	2:08:46.30
13	Caroline Jouisse	France	2:08:49.36
14	Mafalda Rosa	Portugal	2:08:50.54
15	Inès Delacroix	France	2:08:52.23
16	Giulia Berton	Italy	2:08:59.79
17	Clémence Coccordano	France	2:09:47.81
18	Clara Martínez	Spain	2:12:26.97
19	Candela Sánchez	Spain	2:12:34.07
20	Georgia Makri	Greece	2:12:58.12
21	Julie Pleskotová	Czechia	2:14:54.65
22	Ofek Adir	Israel	2:15:15.51
23	Su İnal	Turkey	2:16:41.63
24	Amelie Blocksidge	Great Britain	2:18:35.61
25	Hedwig Bolt	Netherlands	2:18:35.75
26	Emily Golos	Israel	2:19:11.26
27	Leonie Tenzer	Finland	2:19:16.28
28	Tuna Erdoğan	Turkey	2:23:14.25
	Rebeka Androvic	Israel	OTL
	Hana Krasnohorská	Slovakia	Did not finish
	Gökçe Öztürk	Turkey	Did not finish
	Alena Benešová	Czechia	Did not finish
