= Open water swimming at the 2026 European Aquatics Championships – Women's 5 km =

Women's 5 km at the 2026 European Aquatics Championships
- Venue: River Seine
- Dates: 5 August
- Competitors: 26 from 16 nations
- Winning time: 1:02:31.29

Medalists
gold medal	Ginevra Taddeucci	Italy
silver medal	Viktória Mihályvári-Farkas	Hungary
bronze medal	Barbara Pozzobon	Italy

The Women's 5 km competition at the 2026 European Aquatics Championships was held on 5 August 2026.

== Results ==
The race was started at 14:30.

Rank	Swimmer	Nationality	Time
1st place, gold medalist(s)	Ginevra Taddeucci	Italy	1:02:31.29
2nd place, silver medalist(s)	Viktória Mihályvári-Farkas	Hungary	1:02:33.43
3rd place, bronze medalist(s)	Barbara Pozzobon	Italy	1:02:35.19
4	Klaudia Tarasiewicz	Poland	1:02:36.79
5	Inès Delacroix	France	1:02:39.01
6	Lisa Pou	Monaco	1:03:01.12
7	Ekaterina Sorokina	Neutral Athletes B	1:03:02.93
8	Noemi Cesarano	Italy	1:03:04.22
9	Anastasiia Saratova	Neutral Athletes B	1:03:04.85
10	Louna Kasvio	Finland	1:03:08.51
11	Paula Otero	Spain	1:03:10.34
12	Julia Ackermann	Germany	1:03:17.62
13	Candela Sánchez	Spain	1:03:17.79
14	Polina Koziakina	Neutral Athletes B	1:03:18.06
15	Caroline Jouisse	France	1:03:20.41
16	Julie Pleskotová	Czechia	1:03:40.95
17	Lou-Ann Gaudaire	France	1:03:41.25
18	Georgia Makri	Greece	1:03:43.82
19	Ofek Adir	Israel	1:03:44.96
20	Hedwig Bolt	Netherlands	1:06:38.46
21	Su İnal	Turkey	1:06:38.62
22	Alena Benešová	Czechia	1:08:30.88
23	Tuna Erdoğan	Turkey	1:10:02.41
24	Evalotta Aabrams	Estonia	1:11:30.23
25	Lucia Slámová	Slovakia	1:11:32.95
	Gökçe Öztürk	Turkey	OTL
	Fabienne Wenske	Germany	Did not start
	Bettina Fábián	Hungary	Did not start
	Clara Martínez	Spain	Did not start
