= Open water swimming at the 2020 European Aquatics Championships – Women's 25 km =

Women's 25 km at the 2020 European Aquatics Championships
- Venue: Lupa Lake
- Dates: 16 May 2021
- Competitors: 15 from 7 nations
- Winning time: 4:53:57.0

Medalists
gold medal	Lea Boy	Germany
silver medal	Lara Grangeon	France
bronze medal	Barbara Pozzobon	Italy

The Women's 25 km competition of the 2020 European Aquatics Championships was held on 16 May 2021.

== Results ==
The race was held at 9:30.

Rank	Swimmer	Nationality	Time
1st place, gold medalist(s)	Lea Boy	Germany	4:53:57.0
2nd place, silver medalist(s)	Lara Grangeon	France	4:54:58.4
3rd place, bronze medalist(s)	Barbara Pozzobon	Italy	4:54:58.7
4	Kata Sömenek Onon	Hungary	4:55:01.8
5	Ekaterina Sorokina	Russia	4:57:05.7
6	Elea Linka	Germany	4:57:07.6
7	Sofia Kolesnikova	Russia	4:57:16.5
8	Luca Vas	Hungary	4:59:59.5
9	Veronica Santoni	Italy	5:00:27.4
10	Johanna Enkner	Austria	5:01:13.1
11	Mariia Novikova	Russia	5:02:39.6
	Océane Cassignol	France	Did not finish
	Anna Olasz	Hungary	Did not finish
	Jeannette Spiwoks	Germany	Did not finish
	Lenka Štěrbová	Czech Republic	Did not finish
