= Open water swimming at the 2020 European Aquatics Championships – Women's 5 km =

Women's 5 km at the 2020 European Aquatics Championships
- Venue: Lupa Lake
- Dates: 12 May 2021
- Competitors: 20 from 11 nations
- Winning time: 58:45.2

Medalists
| gold medal | Sharon van Rouwendaal | Netherlands |
| silver medal | Giulia Gabbrielleschi | Italy |
| bronze medal | Océane Cassignol | France |

The Women's 5 km competition of the 2020 European Aquatics Championships was held on 12 May 2021.

== Results ==
The race was held at 11:00.

| Rank | Swimmer | Nationality | Time |
|---|---|---|---|
| 1st place, gold medalist(s) | Sharon van Rouwendaal | Netherlands | 58:45.2 |
| 2nd place, silver medalist(s) | Giulia Gabbrielleschi | Italy | 58:49.3 |
| 3rd place, bronze medalist(s) | Océane Cassignol | France | 58:51.4 |
| 4 | Lara Grangeon | France | 58:56.4 |
| 5 | Leonie Beck | Germany | 58:57.2 |
| 6 | Ginevra Taddeucci | Italy | 58:57.8 |
| 7 | Jeannette Spiwoks | Germany | 58:59.4 |
| 8 | Angélica André | Portugal | 59:00.3 |
| 9 | Barbara Pozzobon | Italy | 59:00.4 |
| 10 | Johanna Enkner | Austria | 1:00:44.8 |
| 11 | Alena Benešová | Czech Republic | 1:00:46.1 |
| 12 | Valeriia Ermakova | Russia | 1:00:46.4 |
| 13 | Ekaterina Sorokina | Russia | 1:00:47.3 |
| 14 | Mira Szimcsák | Hungary | 1:00:47.9 |
| 15 | Luca Vas | Hungary | 1:00:48.0 |
| 16 | Lenka Štěrbová | Czech Republic | 1:00:51.5 |
| 17 | Sofia Kolesnikova | Russia | 1:00:51.8 |
| 18 | Julie Pleskotová | Czech Republic | 1:02:05.9 |
| 19 | Nefeli Giannopoulou | Greece | 1:02:13.1 |
| 20 | Lærke Toft Ruby | Denmark | 1:06:59.3 |
