= Slovenia at the 2022 World Aquatics Championships =

- Flag of Slovenia
- World Aquatics code: SLO
- National federation: Slovenian Swimming Association
- Website: plavalna-zveza.si (in Slovene)

in Budapest, Hungary
- Competitors: 6 in 2 sports
- Medals: Gold 0 Silver 0 Bronze 0 Total 0

World Aquatics Championships appearances
- 1994; 1998; 2001; 2003; 2005; 2007; 2009; 2011; 2013; 2015; 2017; 2019; 2022; 2023; 2024; 2025

Other related appearances
- Yugoslavia (1973–1991)

Slovenia competed at the 2022 World Aquatics Championships in Budapest, Hungary from 17 June to 3 July.

== Open water swimming ==
Slovenia qualified one female open water swimmers.

Women

Athlete	Event	Time	Rank
Špela Perše	Women's 5 km	1:00:59.1	23
Špela Perše	Women's 10 km	2:02:43.4	11

== Swimming ==
Slovenia entered five swimmers.

Men

Athlete	Event	Heat		Semifinal		Final	
Athlete	Event	Time	Rank	Time	Rank	Time	Rank
Peter John Stevens	50 m breaststroke	27.64	=15 Q	27.71	15	did not advance	

Women

Athlete	Event	Heat		Semifinal		Final	
Athlete	Event	Time	Rank	Time	Rank	Time	Rank
Katja Fain	200 m freestyle	1:58.84	16 Q	1:58.00	13	did not advance	
Katja Fain	400 m freestyle	4:12.05	15	—N/a		did not advance	
Neža Klančar	50 m freestyle	25.47	19	did not advance			
Neža Klančar	50 m butterfly	26.56	17	did not advance			
Janja Šegel	100 m freestyle	54.56	16 Q	54.36	14	did not advance	
Janja Šegel	200 m freestyle	1:57.71	7 Q	1:58.10	14	did not advance	
Tara Vovk	50 m breaststroke	31.61	23	did not advance			
