= Open water swimming at the 2022 European Aquatics Championships – Women's 5 km =

Women's 5 km at the 2022 European Aquatics Championships
- Venue: Ostia
- Dates: 20 August
- Competitors: 20 from 11 nations
- Winning time: 56:58.7

Medalists
gold medal	Sharon van Rouwendaal	Netherlands
silver medal	María de Valdés	Spain
bronze medal	Giulia Gabbrielleschi	Italy

The Women's 5 km competition of the 2022 European Aquatics Championships will be held on 20 August.

== Results ==
The race was started at 10:00.

Rank	Swimmer	Nationality	Time
1st place, gold medalist(s)	Sharon van Rouwendaal	Netherlands	56:58.7
2nd place, silver medalist(s)	María de Valdés	Spain	57:00.2
3rd place, bronze medalist(s)	Giulia Gabbrielleschi	Italy	57:00.3
4	Angélica André	Portugal	57:00.4
5	Leonie Beck	Germany	57:01.1
6	Aurélie Muller	France	57:03.3
7	Lea Boy	Germany	57:06.2
8	Madelon Catteau	France	57:22.6
9	Mafalda Rosa	Portugal	57:29.0
10	Martina De Memme	Italy	57:36.9
11	Sofie Callo von Platen	Italy	57:54.3
12	Jeannette Spiwoks	Germany	57:58.6
13	Alena Benešová	Czech Republic	58:19.8
14	Eva Fabian	Israel	58:21.3
15	Katja Fain	Slovenia	59:39.9
16	Ángela Martínez	Spain	59:43.0
17	Fleur Lewis	Great Britain	59:58.3
18	Arianna Valloni	San Marino	1:00:00.8
19	Kennedy Denby	Great Britain	1:00:32.3
20	Gablan Orian	Israel	1:02:26.7
