= Slovenia at the 2023 World Aquatics Championships =

- Flag of Slovenia
- World Aquatics code: SLO
- National federation: Slovenian Swimming Association

in Fukuoka, Japan
- Competitors: 8 in 3 sports
- Medals: Gold 0 Silver 0 Bronze 0 Total 0

World Aquatics Championships appearances
- 1994; 1998; 2001; 2003; 2005; 2007; 2009; 2011; 2013; 2015; 2017; 2019; 2022; 2023; 2024; 2025

Other related appearances
- Yugoslavia (1973–1991)

Slovenia competed at the 2023 World Aquatics Championships in Fukuoka, Japan from 14 to 30 July.

== Artistic swimming ==
Slovenia entered 2 artistic swimmers.

Women

Athlete	Event	Preliminaries		Final	
Athlete	Event	Points	Rank	Points	Rank
Nika Seljak	Solo technical routine	155.9468	27	did not advance	
Nika Seljak	Solo free routine	128.8188	19	did not advance	
Karin Pesrl; Nika Seljak	Duet free routine	117.5188	31	did not advance	

== Open water swimming ==
Slovenia entered 1 open water swimmer.

Women

Athlete	Event	Time	Rank
Špela Perše	Women's 5 km	1:01:25.6	23
Špela Perše	Women's 10 km	2:03:48.2	21

== Swimming ==
Slovenia entered 5 swimmers.

Men

Athlete	Event	Heat		Semifinal		Final	
Athlete	Event	Time	Rank	Time	Rank	Time	Rank
Peter Stevens	50 metre breaststroke	27.20	11 Q	27.04	7 Q	27.08	8
Peter Stevens	100 metre breaststroke	1:01.59	31	Did not advance			

Women

Athlete	Event	Heat		Semifinal		Final	
Athlete	Event	Time	Rank	Time	Rank	Time	Rank
Katja Fain	200 metre freestyle	2:01.31	35	Did not advance			
Katja Fain	400 metre freestyle	4:18.05	31	—		Did not advance	
Neza Klancar	50 metre freestyle	24.80 NR	11 Q	24.84	15	Did not advance	
Neza Klancar	50 metre butterfly	25.81 NR	7 Q	25.83	10	Did not advance	
Janja Šegel	100 metre freestyle	55.17	22	Did not advance			
Janja Šegel	200 metre freestyle	1:58.02	13 Q	1:58.18	16	Did not advance	
Janja Šegel	200 metre backstroke	2:17.20	28	Did not advance			
Tara Vovk	50 metre breaststroke	31.97	31	Did not advance			
Tara Vovk	100 metre breaststroke	1:09.68	35	Did not advance			
