= Marathon swimming at the 2024 Summer Olympics – Women's 10 kilometre =

Women's marathon swimming at the Games of the XXXIII Olympiad
- Venue: River Seine
- Dates: 8 August 2024
- Competitors: 24
- Winning time: 2:03:34.2

Medalists
1st place, gold medalist(s)		Sharon van Rouwendaal	Netherlands
2nd place, silver medalist(s)		Moesha Johnson	Australia
3rd place, bronze medalist(s)		Ginevra Taddeucci	Italy

The women's marathon swimming 10 kilometre event at the 2024 Summer Olympics was held on 8 August 2024 in the River Seine, Paris. It was the fifth appearance of the event since its debut in 2008. France spent €1.4–1.6 billion to clean up the Seine in preparation for the Olympic events, but heavy rainfall caused bacteria levels to increase and one of the pre-event training sessions was cancelled. Nonetheless, another training session went ahead and the race started as scheduled.

The race consisted of six 1.67-kilometre loops between Pont Alexandre III and Pont de l'Alma. When travelling from Pont Alexandre III to Pont de l'Alma, the athletes were swimming downstream, but on the way back they were swimming upstream.

Australia's Moesha Johnson, Sharon van Rouwendaal of the Netherlands, and Italians Ginevra Taddeucci and Giulia Gabbrielleschi led for most of the race. During the second half of the fourth lap, van Rouwendaal, Johnson and Taddeucci swam ahead of the rest of the leading group, and they maintained their lead for the rest of the race. During the final lap, Johnson led, followed by van Rouwendaal and then Taddeucci. Near the end, van Rouwendaal overtook Johnson and she maintained her position to win with a time of 2:03:34.2. Johnson finished second with 2:03:39.7 and Taddeucci won third with 2:03:42.8. The win gave van Rouwendaal her second Olympic gold in the event.

== Qualification ==
Each National Olympic Committee (NOC) was permitted to enter a maximum of two qualified athletes in the event. World Aquatics provided a qualification pathway to fulfil their quota of at least 22 competing athletes. Athletes were selected in the following order:

- The three medalists in the 10 km races at the 2023 World Aquatics Championships
- The top thirteen swimmers in the 10 km races at the 2024 World Aquatics Championships
- One representative from each World Aquatics continent (Africa, the Americas, Asia, Europe, and Oceania) (Note: If a continental place was not used, the slot was reallocated to the fastest unqualified swimmer at the 2024 World Aquatics Championships.)
- One representative from the host nation (France) if not qualified by other means (Note: If a French swimmer already qualified, their slot was reallocated to the fastest unqualified swimmer at the 2024 World Aquatics Championships.)

In addition to the athletes invited to fulfil the quota, any athletes who achieved the Olympic Qualification Time in either the 800 or 1500 metres freestyle were invited to compete, provided their respective NOC had not already entered two athletes.

== Background ==
Ana Marcela Cunha of Brazil won the event at the previous Olympics, and she had won 16 open water swimming medals, including seven gold medals, at the World Championships. Sharon van Rouwendaal of the Netherlands won silver in the event at the previous Olympics, and she won the event at the 2016 Olympics. Van Rouwendaal also won this event at the 2022 and 2024 World Championships. Germany's Leonie Beck won silver at the 2022 World Championships and gold at the 2023 World Championships, while the US' Katie Grimes won bronze at the 2023 World Championships and was a two time World Junior open water champion.

== Water quality issues ==
France spent €1.4–1.6 billion to clean up the Seine for the Olympic triathlons and marathon swimming events, (Note: Sources give conflicting figures between 1.4 and 1.6 billion euros.) but heavy rain in the lead-up to the Olympics caused bacteria levels to increase. Earlier in the Olympics, two consecutive training sessions for the triathlons were cancelled, and after the triathlon events took place a few of the competitors reported infections caused by E. coli – a bacterium that was being monitored in the Seine. The Paris 2024 organisers later released a statement that said, "Paris 2024 wishes to remind everyone that the health and wellbeing of athletes is our top priority".

A session in the river was scheduled to take place on 6 August, when the athletes would practice and acclimatize to the river's conditions. However, it was cancelled hours beforehand due to high enterococci levels. A day after, on 7 August, the acclimatization session went ahead, and on 8 August the race took place.

== Race ==
The race was held at 07:30 on 8 August and consisted of six 1.67-kilometre loops between Pont Alexandre III and Pont de l'Alma. When travelling from Pont Alexandre III to Pont de l'Alma, the athletes were swimming downstream, but on the way back they were swimming upstream. After the men's race, Daniel Wiffen stated that he had to swim at a pace faster than approximately 1:12 per 100 metres to be able to swim forward against the current.

Australia's Moesha Johnson led for the downstream part of the first lap, from Pont Alexandre III to Pont de l'Alma, while the Italians Ginevra Taddeucci and Giulia Gabbrielleschi led upstream on the way back. Van Rouwendaal led for the entirety of lap two and maintained her position in the leading group that had formed over the third lap. Over the downstream portion of the fourth lap, Johnson, van Rouwendaal, Taddeucci, Cunha and Australia's Chelsea Gubecka swam away from the lead group, and during the upstream portion, van Rouwendaal, Johnson and Taddeucci swam ahead of that group. The three leaders maintained their lead over the others for the rest of the race.

Going into the final upstream section on the sixth lap, Johnson led, followed by van Rouwendaal and then Taddeucci. Van Rouwendaal overtook Johnson at the final buoy, and maintained her lead to the finish to win with a time of 2:03:34.2. Johnson finished in second with 2:03:39.7, Taddeucci finished third with 2:03:42.8 and Cunha finished fourth with 2:04:15.7. The win gave van Rouwendaal her second Olympic gold in the event, and she dedicated the win to her pet dog. In a report after the race, the Associated Press called van Rouwendaal the greatest female open water swimmer ever. Van Rouwendaal expressed a lack of concern for the water quality issues; she had drunk some of it as she was thirsty and said that it was "cold" and "nice".

Results
Rank	Swimmer	Nation	Time
1st place, gold medalist(s)	Sharon van Rouwendaal	Netherlands	2:03:34.2
2nd place, silver medalist(s)	Moesha Johnson	Australia	2:03:39.7
3rd place, bronze medalist(s)	Ginevra Taddeucci	Italy	2:03:42.8
4	Ana Marcela Cunha	Brazil	2:04:15.7
5	Bettina Fabian	Hungary	2:04:16.9
6	Giulia Gabbrielleschi	Italy	2:04:17.9
7	Océane Cassignol	France	2:06:06.9
8	Caroline Laure Jouisse	France	2:06:11.0
9	Leonie Beck	Germany	2:06:13.4
10	Ángela Martínez	Spain	2:06:15.3
11	Viviane Jungblut	Brazil	2:06:15.8
12	Angélica André	Portugal	2:06:17.0
13	Airi Ebina	Japan	2:06:17.7
14	Chelsea Gubecka	Australia	2:06:17.8
15	Katie Grimes	United States	2:06:29.6
16	Mariah Denigan	United States	2:06:42.9
17	María de Valdés	Spain	2:07:02.4
18	Lisa Pou	Monaco	2:07:05.4
19	Martha Sandoval	Mexico	2:07:24.9
20	Leah Phoebe Crisp	Great Britain	2:07:46.7
21	María Bramont-Arias	Peru	2:12:44.7
22	Leonie Märtens	Germany	2:15:57.3
23	Emma Finlin	Canada	2:22:06.5
24	Xin Xin	China	2:27:02.9
