= Slovenia at the 2017 World Aquatics Championships =

- Flag of Slovenia
- World Aquatics code: SLO
- National federation: Plavalna Zveza Slovenije
- Website: www.plavalna-zveza.si

in Budapest, Hungary
- Competitors: 7 in 2 sports
- Medals: Gold 0 Silver 0 Bronze 0 Total 0

World Aquatics Championships appearances
- 1994; 1998; 2001; 2003; 2005; 2007; 2009; 2011; 2013; 2015; 2017; 2019; 2022; 2023; 2024; 2025

Other related appearances
- Yugoslavia (1973–1991)

Slovenia is scheduled to compete at the 2017 World Aquatics Championships in Budapest, Hungary from 14 July to 30 July.

== Open water swimming ==
Slovenia has entered one open water swimmer

Athlete	Event	Time	Rank
Špela Perše	Women's 5 km	1:01:12.3	18
Špela Perše	Women's 10 km	2:04:12.7	24

== Swimming ==
Slovenian swimmers have achieved qualifying standards in the following events (up to a maximum of 2 swimmers in each event at the A-standard entry time, and 1 at the B-standard):

Men

Athlete	Event	Heat		Semifinal		Final	
Athlete	Event	Time	Rank	Time	Rank	Time	Rank
Martin Bau	400 m freestyle	3:50.75	19	—N/a		did not advance	
Martin Bau	800 m freestyle	8:00.32	19	—N/a		did not advance	
Peter John Stevens	50 m breaststroke	27.39	=16 Q*	27.20	13	did not advance	
Peter John Stevens	100 m breaststroke	1:03.03	47	did not advance			

* Stevens won the swim-off race against two others to compete in the semifinals.

Women

Athlete	Event	Heat		Semifinal		Final	
Athlete	Event	Time	Rank	Time	Rank	Time	Rank
Nastja Govejšek	50 m butterfly	26.65	=22	did not advance			
Nastja Govejšek	100 m butterfly	1:00.25	25	did not advance			
Anja Klinar	400 m freestyle	4:07.75	9	—N/a		did not advance	
Anja Klinar	200 m butterfly	2:09.21	16 Q	2:09.31	14	did not advance	
Gaja Natlačen	200 m freestyle	2:04.22	34	did not advance			
Gaja Natlačen	800 m freestyle	8:41.49	19	—N/a		did not advance	
Gaja Natlačen	1500 m freestyle	16:32.45	13	—N/a		did not advance	
Tjaša Oder	800 m freestyle	8:38.84	15	—N/a		did not advance	
Tjaša Oder	1500 m freestyle	16:34.86	15	—N/a		did not advance	
