= Slovenia at the 2019 World Aquatics Championships =

- Flag of Slovenia
- World Aquatics code: SLO
- National federation: Slovenian Swimming Association
- Website: plavalna-zveza.si (in Slovene)

in Gwangju, South Korea
- Medals: Gold 0 Silver 0 Bronze 0 Total 0

World Aquatics Championships appearances
- 1994; 1998; 2001; 2003; 2005; 2007; 2009; 2011; 2013; 2015; 2017; 2019; 2022; 2023; 2024; 2025

Other related appearances
- Yugoslavia (1973–1991)

Slovenia competed at the 2019 World Aquatics Championships in Gwangju, South Korea from 12 to 28 July.

== Open water swimming ==
Slovenia qualified one female open water swimmers.

Women

| Athlete | Event | Time | Rank |
|---|---|---|---|
| Špela Perše | Women's 5 km | 58:12.1 | 16 |
| Špela Perše | Women's 10 km | 1:55:44.4 | 27 |

== Swimming ==
Slovenia entered four swimmers.

Men

| Athlete | Event | Heat | | Semifinal | | Final | |
| Athlete | Event | Time | Rank | Time | Rank | Time | Rank |
|---|---|---|---|---|---|---|---|
| Peter John Stevens | 50 m breaststroke | 27.50 | 22 | did not advance | | | |
| Peter John Stevens | 100 m breaststroke | 1:01.90 | 39 | did not advance | | | |

Women

| Athlete | Event | Heat | | Semifinal | | Final | |
| Athlete | Event | Time | Rank | Time | Rank | Time | Rank |
|---|---|---|---|---|---|---|---|
| Katja Fain | 200 m freestyle | 2:00.38 | 22 | did not advance | | | |
| Katja Fain | 400 m freestyle | 4:17.57 | 26 | —N/a | | did not advance | |
| Katja Fain | 400 m individual medley | 4:48.24 | 20 | —N/a | | did not advance | |
| Neža Klančar | 50 m freestyle | 25.12 | 18 | did not advance | | | |
| Neža Klančar | 100 m freestyle | 54.88 | 25 | did not advance | | | |
| Neža Klančar | 200 m individual medley | 2:16.53 | 24 | did not advance | | | |
| Tjaša Oder | 800 m freestyle | 8:30.97 | 9 | —N/a | | did not advance | |
| Tjaša Oder | 1500 m freestyle | 16:10.14 | 9 | —N/a | | did not advance | |
