= Swimming at the 2022 European Aquatics Championships – Women's 1500 metre freestyle =

Women's 1500 metre freestyle at the 2022 European Aquatics Championships
- Venue: Foro Italico
- Dates: 14 August (heats); 15 August (final)
- Competitors: 22 from 14 nations
- Winning time: 15:54.15

Medalists
gold medal	Simona Quadarella	Italy
silver medal	Viktória Mihályvári-Farkas	Hungary
bronze medal	Martina Caramignoli	Italy

The Women's 1500 metre freestyle competition of the 2022 European Aquatics Championships was held on 14 and 15 August 2022.

== Records ==
Before the competition, the existing world, European and championship records were as follows.

	Name	Nationality	Time	Location	Date
World record	Katie Ledecky	United States	15:20.48	Indianapolis	16 May 2018
European record	Lotte Friis	Denmark	15:38.88	Barcelona	30 July 2013
Championship record	Boglárka Kapás	Hungary	15:50.22	London	21 May 2016

== Results ==
=== Heats ===
The heats were started on 14 August at 10:18.

Rank	Heat	Lane	Name	Nationality	Time	Notes
1	3	4	Simona Quadarella	Italy	16:05.61	Q
2	3	5	Viktória Mihályvári-Farkas	Hungary	16:09.87	Q
3	3	3	Tamila Holub	Portugal	16:24.03	Q
4	2	5	Martina Caramignoli	Italy	16:24.84	Q
5	2	6	Ángela Martínez	Spain	16:25.19	Q
6	2	7	Alisée Pisane	Belgium	16:26.20	Q, NR
7	3	2	Diana Durães	Portugal	16:29.03	Q
8	3	6	Paula Otero	Spain	16:30.78	Q
9	3	1	Paulina Piechota	Poland	16:31.59	
10	2	2	Bettina Fábián	Hungary	16:39.39	
11	2	8	Imani de Jong	Netherlands	16:40.11	
12	2	4	Ajna Késely	Hungary	16:44.16	
13	3	8	Lucie Hanquet	France	16:48.42	
14	2	3	Celine Rieder	Germany	16:48.97	
15	3	7	Fabienne Wenske	Germany	16:50.26	
16	3	0	Lara Seifert	Germany	16:53.51	
17	2	0	Klara Tarasiewicz	Poland	16:53.87	
18	2	1	Duru Tanriverdi	Romania	16:55.85	
19	1	3	Noemi Freimann	Switzerland	17:03.51	
20	1	5	Thilda Häll	Sweden	17:06.81	
21	3	9	Arianna Valloni	San Marino	17:07.87	
22	1	4	Grace Hodgins	Ireland	17:25.04	

=== Final ===
The final was held on 15 August at 19:29.

Rank	Lane	Name	Nationality	Time	Notes
1st place, gold medalist(s)	4	Simona Quadarella	Italy	15:54.15	
2nd place, silver medalist(s)	5	Viktória Mihályvári-Farkas	Hungary	16:02.15	
3rd place, bronze medalist(s)	6	Martina Caramignoli	Italy	16:12.39	
4	8	Paula Otero	Spain	16:18.27	
5	3	Tamila Holub	Portugal	16:18.64	
6	2	Ángela Martínez	Spain	16:22.37	
7	1	Diana Durães	Portugal	16:26.53	
8	7	Alisée Pisane	Belgium	16:37.34	
