= Swimming at the 2020 European Aquatics Championships – Women's 1500 metre freestyle =

Women's 1500 metre freestyle at the 2020 European Aquatics Championships
- Venue: Danube Arena
- Dates: 20 May 2021 (heats); 21 May 2021 (final)
- Competitors: 23 from 13 nations
- Winning time: 15:53.59

Medalists
gold medal	Simona Quadarella	Italy
silver medal	Anastasiya Kirpichnikova	Russia
bronze medal	Martina Caramignoli	Italy

The Women's 1500 metre freestyle competition of the 2020 European Aquatics Championships was held on 20 and 21 May 2021.

== Records ==
Before the competition, the existing world, European and championship records were as follows.

	Name	Nationality	Time	Location	Date
World record	Katie Ledecky	United States	15:20.48	Indianapolis	16 May 2018
European record	Lotte Friis	Denmark	15:38.88	Barcelona	30 July 2013
Championship record	Boglárka Kapás	Hungary	15:50.22	London	21 May 2016

== Results ==
=== Heats ===
The heats were started on 20 May at 11:29.

Rank	Heat	Lane	Name	Nationality	Time	Notes
1	3	4	Simona Quadarella	Italy	16:05.60	Q
2	3	7	Viktória Mihályvári-Farkas	Hungary	16:14.12	Q
3	3	2	Tamila Holub	Portugal	16:15.50	Q
4	3	6	María de Valdés	Spain	16:16.21	Q
5	2	4	Anastasiya Kirpichnikova	Russia	16:19.06	Q
6	3	5	Ajna Késely	Hungary	16:20.25	Q
7	2	5	Martina Caramignoli	Italy	16:20.31	Q
8	3	3	Jimena Pérez	Spain	16:22.37	Q
9	2	6	Julia Hassler	Liechtenstein	16:24.50	
10	2	2	Katja Fain	Slovenia	16:28.66	
11	2	3	Diana Durães	Portugal	16:31.97	
12	1	4	Lia Csulák	Hungary	16:44.64	
13	2	7	Marlene Kahler	Austria	16:44.69	
14	2	0	Marina Heller Hansen	Denmark	16:46.96	
15	3	8	Anna Olasz	Hungary	16:48.87	
16	2	1	Paulina Piechota	Poland	16:49.86	
17	3	0	Daša Tušek	Slovenia	16:52.66	
18	2	9	Matea Sumajstorčić	Croatia	16:54.19	
19	1	5	Klara Bošnjak	Croatia	16:54.20	
20	3	9	Arianna Valloni	San Marino	16:55.60	
21	1	6	Johanna Enkner	Austria	17:03.31	
22	1	3	Sasha Gatt	Malta	17:10.43	
23	1	2	Nika Špehar	Croatia	17:18.67	
	2	8	Malene Rypestøl	Norway	Did not start	
	3	1	Helena Rosendahl Bach	Denmark	Did not start	

=== Final ===
The final was held on 21 May at 18:00.

Rank	Lane	Name	Nationality	Time	Notes
1st place, gold medalist(s)	4	Simona Quadarella	Italy	15:53.59	
2nd place, silver medalist(s)	2	Anastasiya Kirpichnikova	Russia	16:01.06	
3rd place, bronze medalist(s)	1	Martina Caramignoli	Italy	16:05.81	
4	7	Ajna Késely	Hungary	16:10.50	
5	6	María de Valdés	Spain	16:14.77	
6	5	Viktória Mihályvári-Farkas	Hungary	16:17.27	
7	8	Jimena Pérez	Spain	16:19.11	
8	3	Tamila Holub	Portugal	16:32.20	
