= Swimming at the 2020 European Aquatics Championships – Women's 400 metre individual medley =

Women's 400 metre individual medley at the 2020 European Aquatics Championships
- Venue: Danube Arena
- Dates: 17 May 2021
- Competitors: 15 from 7 nations
- Winning time: 4:34.76

Medalists
gold medal	Katinka Hosszú	Hungary
silver medal	Viktória Mihályvári-Farkas	Hungary
silver medal	Aimee Willmott	Great Britain

The Women's 400 metre individual medley competition of the 2020 European Aquatics Championships was held on 17 May 2021.

== Records ==
Before the competition, the existing world, European and championship records were as follows.

	Name	Nationality	Time	Location	Date
World record European record	Katinka Hosszú	Hungary	4:26.36	Rio de Janeiro	6 August 2016
Championship record	Katinka Hosszú	Hungary	4:30.90	London	16 May 2016

== Results ==
=== Heats ===
The heats were started at 10:00.

Rank	Heat	Lane	Name	Nationality	Time	Notes
1	2	4	Katinka Hosszú	Hungary	4:37.42	Q
2	2	2	Viktória Mihályvári-Farkas	Hungary	4:38.07	Q
3	1	6	Boglárka Kapás	Hungary	4:40.03	
4	1	4	Aimee Willmott	Great Britain	4:40.19	Q
5	2	6	Zsuzsanna Jakabos	Hungary	4:40.50	
6	1	5	Ilaria Cusinato	Italy	4:40.82	Q
7	2	3	Anja Crevar	Serbia	4:41.14	Q
8	2	7	Catalina Corró	Spain	4:43.49	Q
9	1	1	Zoe Vogelmann	Germany	4:43.51	Q
10	2	5	Sara Franceschi	Italy	4:44.65	Q
11	1	3	Alba Vázquez	Spain	4:45.26	
12	1	2	Kim Herkle	Germany	4:46.86	
13	2	1	Katie Shanahan	Great Britain	4:47.28	
14	1	7	Giulia Goerigk	Germany	4:48.36	
15	2	8	Iman Avdić	Bosnia and Herzegovina	5:06.88	

=== Final ===
The final was held at 18:00.

Rank	Lane	Name	Nationality	Time	Notes
1st place, gold medalist(s)	4	Katinka Hosszú	Hungary	4:34.76	
2nd place, silver medalist(s)	5	Viktória Mihályvári-Farkas	Hungary	4:36.81	
2nd place, silver medalist(s)	3	Aimee Willmott	Great Britain	4:36.81	
4	6	Ilaria Cusinato	Italy	4:38.08	
5	8	Sara Franceschi	Italy	4:40.74	
6	2	Anja Crevar	Serbia	4:40.84	
7	1	Zoe Vogelmann	Germany	4:45.61	
8	7	Catalina Corró	Spain	4:46.03	
