= Barbara Pozzobon =

Italian swimmer (born 1993)

Personal information
- Nationality: Italian
- Born: 17 September 1993 (age 32) Maserada sul Piave

Sport
- Sport: Swimming
- Strokes: Open water swimming
Medal record
Women's swimming
Representing Italy
World Championships
Gold medal – first place	2023 Fukuoka	Team event
Silver medal – second place	2025 Singapore	Team open water
European Championships
Gold medal – first place	2024 Belgrade	25 km open water
Silver medal – second place	2022 Rome	25 km open water
Silver medal – second place	2024 Belgrade	10 km open water
Silver medal – second place	2026 Paris	Team open water
Bronze medal – third place	2020 Budapest	25 km open water
Bronze medal – third place	2026 Paris	5 km open water

Barbara Pozzobon (born 17 September 1993) is an Italian swimmer competing in open water competitions. She won the gold medal in the women's 25 km event at the 2024 European Aquatics Championships held in Belgrade, Serbia.

Pozzobon represented Italy at the 2019 World Aquatics Championships in Gwangju, South Korea. She competed in the women's 25 km event and she finished in 13th place.

== Career ==
In 2016, Pozzobon competed in the women's 25 km event at the European Open Water Championships held in Hoorn, Netherlands. The following year, she competed in the women's 10 kilometre marathon event at the 2017 Summer Universiade held in Taipei, Taiwan. Pozzobon competed in the women's 25 km event at the 2019 World Aquatics Championships held in Gwangju, South Korea.

In 2021, Pozzobon won the bronze medal in the women's 25 km event at the 2020 European Aquatics Championships held in Budapest, Hungary. She also finished in 9th place in the women's 5 km event. She represented Italy at the 2022 World Aquatics Championships held in Budapest, Hungary. She finished in 4th place in the women's 25 km event. In 2023, Pozzobon won the gold medal in the team event at the World Aquatics Championships held in Fukuoka, Japan. She also finished in 5th place in the women's 5 km event.

Pozzobon competed in the women's 5 km event at the 2024 World Aquatics Championships held in Doha, Qatar. A few months later, she won two medals at the 2024 European Aquatics Championships: she won the gold medal in the women's 25 km event and the silver medal in the women's 10 km event.
