= Swimming at the 2017 Summer Universiade – Women's 10 kilometre marathon =

Women's 10 kilometre marathon at the 2017 Summer Universiade
- Venue: New Taipei City Breeze Canal
- Location: Taipei, Taiwan
- Dates: 27 August
- Competitors: 17 from 11 nations
- Winning time: 2:04:12.2

Medalists
gold medal	Anna Olasz	Hungary
silver medal	Giulia Gabrielleschi	Italy
bronze medal	Adeline Furst	France

The Women's 10 kilometre marathon competition at the 2017 Summer Universiade was held on 27 August 2017.

== Results ==
The race was started at 6:15.

Rank	Name	Nationality	Time
1st place, gold medalist(s)	Anna Olasz	Hungary	2:04:12.2
2nd place, silver medalist(s)	Giulia Gabrielleschi	Italy	2:04:17.9
3rd place, bronze medalist(s)	Adeline Furst	France	2:04:23.1
4	Viviane Jungblut	Brazil	2:04:39.3
5	Onon Sömenek	Hungary	2:04:40.8
6	Barbara Pozzobon	Italy	2:04:42.8
7	Yukimi Moriyama	Japan	2:04:49.5
8	Maria Novikova	Russia	2:05:05.0
9	Svenja Zihsler	Germany	2:05:12.6
10	Joanna Zachoszcz	Poland	2:05:32.7
11	Olga Kozydub	Russia	2:06:49.0
12	Minami Niikura	Japan	2:06:49.1
13	Lenka Štěrbová	Czech Republic	2:14:51.2
14	Betina Lorscheitte	Brazil	2:14:52.4
15	Xeniya Romanchuk	Kazakhstan	2:15:45.2
	Samantha Winward	New Zealand	DNF
	Justyna Burska	Poland	DNF
	Kareena Lee	Australia	DNS
	Jade Dusablon	Canada	DNS
	Lauren Teghtsoonian	Canada	DNS
	Martina Elhenická	Czech Republic	DNS
	Alice Dearing	Great Britain	DNS
	Sasha-Lee Nordengen-Corris	South Africa	DNS
