= Swimming at the 2018 Mediterranean Games – Women's 200 metre freestyle =

Women's 200 metre freestyle at the 2018 Mediterranean Games
- Venue: Campclar Aquatic Center
- Location: Tarragona, Spain
- Dates: 24 June
- Competitors: 18 from 11 nations
- Winning time: 1:59.12

Medalists
| gold medal | Marie Wattel | France |
| silver medal | Melani Costa | Spain |
| bronze medal | Linda Caponi | Italy |

The women's 200 metre freestyle competition at the 2018 Mediterranean Games was held on 24 June 2018 at the Campclar Aquatic Center.

== Records ==
Prior to this competition, the existing world and Mediterranean Games records were as follows:

| World record | Federica Pellegrini (ITA) | 1:52.98 | Rome, Italy | 29 July 2009 |
| Mediterranean Games record | Patricia Castro (ESP) | 1:58.91 | Pescara, Italy | 30 June 2009 |

== Results ==
=== Heats ===
The heats were held at 09:53.

| Rank | Heat | Lane | Name | Nationality | Time | Notes |
|---|---|---|---|---|---|---|
| 1 | 2 | 4 | Melani Costa | Spain | 2:01.18 | Q |
| 2 | 2 | 5 | Lidón Muñoz | Spain | 2:01.63 | Q |
| 3 | 3 | 4 | Marie Wattel | France | 2:02.28 | Q |
| 4 | 3 | 3 | Neža Klančar | Slovenia | 2:02.44 | Q |
| 5 | 2 | 3 | Diana Durães | Portugal | 2:02.71 | Q |
| 6 | 2 | 6 | Vasiliki Baka | Greece | 2:02.89 | Q |
| 7 | 3 | 5 | Linda Caponi | Italy | 2:02.97 | Q |
| 8 | 3 | 6 | Rita Frischknecht | Portugal | 2:03.11 | Q |
| 9 | 2 | 1 | Katja Fain | Slovenia | 2:03.19 | |
| 10 | 1 | 4 | Stefania Pirozzi | Italy | 2:03.32 | |
| 11 | 1 | 5 | Alizée Morel | France | 2:04.13 | |
| 12 | 3 | 2 | Rim Ouenniche | Tunisia | 2:04.93 | |
| 13 | 1 | 6 | Beril Böcekler | Turkey | 2:06.56 | |
| 14 | 2 | 2 | Afroditi Katsiara | Greece | 2:07.44 | |
| 15 | 3 | 7 | Gabriella Doueihy | Lebanon | 2:09.29 | |
| 16 | 1 | 7 | Elisa Bernardi | San Marino | 2:09.69 | |
| 17 | 2 | 7 | Sara Lettoli | San Marino | 2:09.80 | |
| 18 | 1 | 2 | Nàdia Tudó | Andorra | 2:11.72 | |
| | 1 | 3 | Selen Özbilen | Turkey | DNS | |
| | 3 | 1 | Nikol Merizaj | Albania | DNS | |

=== Final ===
The final was held at 17:45.

| Rank | Lane | Name | Nationality | Time | Notes |
|---|---|---|---|---|---|
| 1st place, gold medalist(s) | 3 | Marie Wattel | France | 1:59.12 | |
| 2nd place, silver medalist(s) | 4 | Melani Costa | Spain | 1:59.75 | |
| 3rd place, bronze medalist(s) | 1 | Linda Caponi | Italy | 2:00.02 | |
| 4 | 5 | Lidón Muñoz | Spain | 2:00.25 | |
| 5 | 2 | Diana Durães | Portugal | 2:02.00 | |
| 6 | 6 | Neža Klančar | Slovenia | 2:02.33 | |
| 7 | 8 | Rita Frischknecht | Portugal | 2:04.07 | |
| 8 | 7 | Vasiliki Baka | Greece | 2:04.36 | |
