= 2025 European Open Water Swimming Championships =

Water sport competitions

- Location: Stari Grad, Croatia
- Dates: 28–31 May
- Nations: 19

The 2025 European Open Water Swimming Championships were held in Stari Grad, Croatia, from 28 to 31 May 2025.

== Medal table ==
| Rank | Nation | Gold | Silver | Bronze | Total |
|---|---|---|---|---|---|
| 1 | Hungary | 5 | 2 | 2 | 9 |
| 2 | Italy | 2 | 2 | 0 | 4 |
| 3 | France | 0 | 2 | 2 | 4 |
| 4 | Spain | 0 | 1 | 1 | 2 |
| 5 | Germany | 0 | 0 | 2 | 2 |
| Totals (5 entries) | | 7 | 7 | 7 | 21 |

== Results ==
=== Men ===
| Event | Gold | | Silver | | Bronze | |
|---|---|---|---|---|---|---|
| 3 km knockout sprint | Kristóf Rasovszky; Hungary | 5:04.04 | Logan Fontaine; France | 5:04.66 | Dávid Betlehem; Hungary | 5:05.20 |
| 5 km | Gregorio Paltrinieri; Italy | 52:05.79 | Dávid Betlehem; Hungary | 52:08.07 | Kristóf Rasovszky; Hungary | 52:13.57 |
| 10 km | Kristóf Rasovszky; Hungary | 1:47:23.68 | Logan Fontaine; France | 1:47:26.05 | Marc-Antoine Olivier; France | 1:47:26.18 |

=== Women ===
| Event | Gold | | Silver | | Bronze | |
|---|---|---|---|---|---|---|
| 3 km knockout sprint | Bettina Fábián; Hungary | 5:19.83 | Paula Otero; Spain | 5:23.83 | Lea Boy; Germany | 5:25.22 |
| 5 km | Ginevra Taddeucci; Italy | 59:51.95 | Viktória Mihályvári-Farkas; Hungary | 59:53.94 | María de Valdés; Spain | 59:55.03 |
| 10 km | Viktória Mihályvári-Farkas; Hungary | 1:57:27.54 | Ginevra Taddeucci; Italy | 1:57:30.35 | Lea Boy; Germany | 1:57:34.38 |

=== Mixed event ===
| Event | Gold | | Silver | | Bronze | |
|---|---|---|---|---|---|---|
| Team event | Hungary; Viktória Mihályvári-Farkas; Bettina Fábián; Dávid Betlehem; Kristóf Rasovszky | 1:03:39.45 | Italy; Giulia Gabbrielleschi; Ginevra Taddeucci; Marcello Guidi; Gregorio Paltrinieri | 1:03:41.39 | France; Clémence Coccordano; Inès Delacroix; Sacha Velly; Logan Fontaine | 1:03:41.72 |

== Championships Trophy ==
| Rank | Country | M | W | Mx | Total |
|---|---|---|---|---|---|
| 1st place, gold medalist(s) | Hungary | 92 | 64 | 36 | 192 |
| 2 | Italy | 70 | 81 | 32 | 183 |
| 3 | France | 99 | 17 | 28 | 144 |
| 4 | Germany | 11 | 47 | 24 | 82 |
| 5 | Spain | 4 | 62 | | 66 |
| 6 | Turkey | 5 | 5 | 20 | 30 |
| 7 | Poland | 5 | 20 | | 25 |
| 8 | Slovakia | 2 | 1 | 16 | 19 |
| 9 | Israel | 13 | 4 | | 17 |
| 10 | Faroe Islands | 2 | 1 | 12 | 15 |
| 11 | Portugal | 4 | 6 | | 10 |
| 12 | Greece | 5 | 1 | | 6 |
| 13 | Croatia | 4 | 1 | | 5 |
| 14 | Switzerland | 4 | | | 4 |
| 14 | Czech Republic | 2 | 2 | | 4 |
| 16 | Finland | | 3 | | 3 |
| 16 | Slovenia | | 3 | | 3 |
| 18 | Austria | 2 | | | 2 |
| 18 | Great Britain | 1 | 1 | | 2 |
