= Slovenia at the 2024 World Aquatics Championships =

- Flag of Slovenia
- FINA code: SLO
- National federation: Slovenian Swimming Association

in Doha, Qatar
- Competitors: 11 in 2 sports
- Medals: Gold 0 Silver 0 Bronze 0 Total 0

World Aquatics Championships appearances
- 1994; 1998; 2001; 2003; 2005; 2007; 2009; 2011; 2013; 2015; 2017; 2019; 2022; 2023; 2024

Other related appearances
- Yugoslavia (1973–1991)

Slovenia competed at the 2024 World Aquatics Championships in Doha, Qatar from 2 to 18 February.

== Competitors ==
The following is the list of competitors in the Championships.

Sport	Men	Women	Total
Open water swimming	1	2*	3*
Swimming	4	5*	9*
Total	5	6*	11*

Katja Fain competed in both open water swimming and pool swimming.

== Open water swimming ==
Men

Athlete	Event	Time	Rank
Nik Peterlin	Men's 5 km	54:14.8	34
Nik Peterlin	Men's 10 km	1:54:34.9	57

Women

Athlete	Event	Time	Rank
Katja Fain	Women's 5 km	1:01:20.4	40
Katja Fain	Women's 10 km	2:11:00.3	52
Špela Perše	Women's 5 km	59:10.4	28
Špela Perše	Women's 10 km	2:07:38.7	48

== Swimming ==
Slovenia entered 11 swimmers.

Men

Athlete	Event	Heat		Semifinal		Final	
Athlete	Event	Time	Rank	Time	Rank	Time	Rank
Anže Ferš Eržen	200 metre individual medley	2:01.71	17	Did not advance			
Anže Ferš Eržen	400 metre individual medley	4:23.64	15	—		Did not advance	
Sašo Boškan	200 metre freestyle	1:49.66	33	Did not advance			
Sašo Boškan	400 metre freestyle	3:56.38	37	—		Did not advance	
Primož Šenica	200 metre backstroke	2:04.11	25	Did not advance			
Peter John Stevens	50 metre breaststroke	26.79	5 Q	27.04	7 Q	27.07	8
Peter John Stevens	100 metre breaststroke	1:00.87	24	Did not advance			

Women

Athlete	Event	Heat		Semifinal		Final	
Athlete	Event	Time	Rank	Time	Rank	Time	Rank
Neža Klančar	50 metre freestyle	25.05	13 Q	24.87	13	Did not advance	
Neža Klančar	50 metre butterfly	26.07	11 Q	26.08	12	Did not advance	
Janja Šegel	200 metre freestyle	1:59.37	15 Q	1:59.95	15	Did not advance	
Janja Šegel	200 metre backstroke	2:17.31	23	Did not advance			
Tara Vovk	50 metre breaststroke	31.65	22	Did not advance			
Tara Vovk	100 metre breaststroke	1:11.81	36	Did not advance			
Neža Klančar; Janja Šegel; Katja Fain; Hana Sekuti	4 × 100 m freestyle relay	3:42.11	8 Q	—		3:41.72	8
Janja Šegel; Katja Fain; Neža Klančar; Hana Sekuti	4 × 200 m freestyle relay	8:09.32	16	—		Did not advance	
Janja Šegel; Tara Vovk; Hana Sekuti; Neža Klančar	4 × 100 m medley relay	4:07.47 NR	15	—		Did not advance	
