= Airi Ebina =

Japanese swimmer (born 2001)

Personal information
- Nationality: Japanese
- Born: 25 November 2001 (age 24) Obihiro, Japan

Sport
- Sport: Swimming
Medal record
Women's swimming
Representing Japan
Asian Games
Silver medal – second place	2022 Hangzhou	10 km marathon
Pan Pacific Championships
Silver medal – second place	2026 Long Beach	10 km open water

Airi Ebina (蝦名愛梨, Ebina Airi; born 25 November 2001) is a Japanese swimmer who specializes in open water swimming. She represented Japan at the 2024 Summer Olympics.

== Career ==
Ebina competed at the 2022 Asian Games, which were postponed until October 2023, and won a silver medal in the 10 kilometre marathon event with a time of 2:03:44.9. In August 2024, she represented Japan at the 2024 Summer Olympics and finished in 13th place in the 10 km open water marathon with a time of 2:06:17.7.

In August 2026, she competed at 2026 Pan Pacific Swimming Championships and won a silver medal in the 10 kilometre open water marathon with a time of 1:55:59.
