= Slovenia at the 2015 World Aquatics Championships =

- Flag of Slovenia
- FINA code: SLO
- National federation: Plavalna Zveza Slovenije
- Website: www.plavalna-zveza.si

in Kazan, Russia
- Competitors: 11 in 2 sports
- Medals: Gold 0 Silver 0 Bronze 0 Total 0

World Aquatics Championships appearances
- 1994; 1998; 2001; 2003; 2005; 2007; 2009; 2011; 2013; 2015; 2017; 2019; 2022; 2023; 2024

Other related appearances
- Yugoslavia (1973–1991)

Slovenia competed at the 2015 World Aquatics Championships in Kazan, Russia from 24 July to 9 August 2015.

== Open water swimming ==
Slovenia has qualified one swimmer to compete in the open water marathon.

Athlete	Event	Time	Rank
Špela Perše	Women's 5 km	59:59.7	16
Špela Perše	Women's 10 km	1:59:38.3	23

== Swimming ==
Slovenian swimmers have achieved qualifying standards in the following events (up to a maximum of 2 swimmers in each event at the A-standard entry time, and 1 at the B-standard):

Men

Athlete	Event	Heat		Semifinal		Final	
Athlete	Event	Time	Rank	Time	Rank	Time	Rank
Martin Bau	400 m freestyle	3:51.44	28	—		did not advance	
Martin Bau	800 m freestyle	8:04.11	27	—		did not advance	
Martin Bau	1500 m freestyle	15:22.80	24	—		did not advance	
Damir Dugonjič	50 m breaststroke	26.70	3 Q	26.92	5 Q	27.23	=5
Damir Dugonjič	100 m breaststroke	1:00.36	17	did not advance			
Peter John Stevens	50 m breaststroke	27.46	12 Q	27.50	=12	did not advance	
Robert Žbogar	100 m butterfly	53.10	32	did not advance			
Robert Žbogar	200 m butterfly	1:58.55	23	did not advance			
Robert Žbogar	400 m individual medley	4:25.10	32	—		did not advance	

Women

Athlete	Event	Heat		Semifinal		Final	
Athlete	Event	Time	Rank	Time	Rank	Time	Rank
Nastja Govejšek	100 m freestyle	56.19	36	did not advance			
Nastja Govejšek	50 m butterfly	26.54	18	did not advance			
Nastja Govejšek	100 m butterfly	1:01.15	39	did not advance			
Anja Klinar	400 m freestyle	4:08.57	10	—		did not advance	
Anja Klinar	200 m butterfly	2:09.70	15 Q	2:08.52	10	did not advance	
Anja Klinar	400 m individual medley	4:38.39	9	—		did not advance	
Gaja Natlačen	200 m freestyle	2:02.32	39	did not advance			
Gaja Natlačen	1500 m freestyle	16:24.83	11	—		did not advance	
Tjaša Oder	800 m freestyle	8:38.85	17	—		did not advance	
Tjaša Oder	1500 m freestyle	16:31.22	15	—		did not advance	
Tanja Šmid	200 m breaststroke	2:28.64	24	did not advance			
Tjaša Vozel	50 m breaststroke	32.00	32	did not advance			
Tjaša Vozel	100 m breaststroke	1:09.27	31	did not advance			
