= Open water swimming at the 2024 European Aquatics Championships – Women's 25 km =

Women's 25 km at the 2024 European Aquatics Championships
- Venue: Ada Ciganlija
- Dates: 14 June
- Competitors: 6 from 5 nations
- Winning time: 5:25:37.7

Medalists
gold medal	Barbara Pozzobon	Italy
silver medal	Lea Boy	Germany
bronze medal	Candela Sánchez	Spain

The Women's 25 km competition at the 2024 European Aquatics Championships was held on 14 June.

== Results ==
The race was started at 09:05.

Rank	Swimmer	Nationality	Time
1st place, gold medalist(s)	Barbara Pozzobon	Italy	5:25:37.7
2nd place, silver medalist(s)	Lea Boy	Germany	5:28:39.6
3rd place, bronze medalist(s)	Candela Sánchez	Spain	5:29:15.2
4	Vivien Balogh	Hungary	5:31:46.5
	Veronica Santoni	Italy	DNF
	Inès Delacroix	France	DNF
