= Martina Caramignoli =

Italian swimmer (born 1991)

Personal information
- Born: 25 May 1991 (age 35) Rieti, Italy
- Height: 1.68 m (5 ft 6 in)
- Weight: 53 kg (117 lb)

Sport
- Sport: Swimming
- Club: G.S. Fiamme Oro
Medal record
Women's swimming
Representing Italy
European championships (LC)
Bronze medal – third place	2014 Berlin	1500 m freestyle
Bronze medal – third place	2020 Budapest	1500 m freestyle
Bronze medal – third place	2022 Rome	1500 m freestyle
European Championships (SC)
Bronze medal – third place	2019 Glasgow	800 m freestyle
Mediterranean Games
Bronze medal – third place	2022 Oran	800 m freestyle
Summer Universiade
Gold medal – first place	2015 Gwangju	1500 m freestyle
Silver medal – second place	2015 Gwangju	800 m freestyle
Bronze medal – third place	2013 Kazan	1500 m freestyle

Martina (Rita) Caramignoli (born 25 May 1991) is an Italian freestyle swimmer. She competed at the 2020 Summer Olympics, in 800 m freestyle and 1500 m freestyle.

She won a bronze medal in the 1500 m at the 2014 European Aquatics Championships.

Martina Caramignoli is an athlete of the Gruppo Sportivo Fiamme Oro.

At the 2022 European Aquatics Championships, contested in Rome in August, Caramignoli won the bronze medal in the 1500 metre freestyle, finishing in a time of 16:12.39, which was less than 20 seconds behind gold medalist and fellow Italian Simona Quadarella.

== Education ==
She currently studies Agriculture at the University of Pisa.
