= 2026 Pan Pacific Swimming Championships – Women's 10 kilometre open water =

Women's 10 kilometre open water at the 2026 Pan Pacific Swimming Championships
- Venue: Long Beach, California
- Dates: 10 August
- Competitors: 22 from 8 nations
- Winning time: 1:55:33

Medalists
gold medal	Moesha Johnson	Australia
silver medal	Airi Ebina	Japan
bronze medal	Ichika Kajimoto	Japan

Official Video

The women's 10 kilometre open water competition of the 2026 Pan Pacific Swimming Championships was held on 10 August at Long Beach, California.

At a meeting of the charter nations of the Pan Pacific Swimming Association on 23 August 2024, it was agreed that the 10 kilometre open water events at the 2026 Pan Pacific Swimming Championships would be open all members of European Aquatics should they wish to attend, with a cap of two entries per event. Four European swimmers contested the events – Germany's Jeanette Spiwoks in the women's event and in the men's Florian Wellbrock for Germany and both Dario Verani and Pasquale Giordano who represented Italy.

== Results ==
Final results
Rank	Swimmer	Nation	Time	Notes
1st place, gold medalist(s)	Moesha Johnson	Australia	1:55:33	
2nd place, silver medalist(s)	Airi Ebina	Japan	1:55:59	
3rd place, bronze medalist(s)	Ichika Kajimoto	Japan	1:56:07	
4	Rebecca Mann	United States	1:56:15	
5	Jacqueline Davison-McGovern	Australia	1:56:17	
6	Mariah Denigan	United States	1:58:44	
7	Ashley Twichell	United States	1:58:51	
8	Katie Grimes	United States	1:59:04	
9	Brinkleigh Hansen	United States	1:59:04	
10	Callan Lotter	South Africa	1:59:12	
11	Tiana Kritzinger	Australia	1:59:21	
12	Chelsea Douyere	Australia	2:00:23	
13	Emma Finlin	Canada	2:03:23	
14	Cibelle Jungblut	Brazil	2:05:50	
15	Jeannette Spiwoks	Germany	2:06:56	
16	Yuritzi Salgado	Mexico	2:06:58	
17	Dalia Moreno	Mexico	2:07:02	
18	Viviane Jungblut	Brazil	2:08:37	
19	Paulina Alanis	Mexico	2:08:39	
20	Carli Antonopoulos	South Africa	2:08:45	
21	Sasha-Lee Hemmens	South Africa	2:09:35	
22	Kiara Banks	South Africa	2:12:03	
