= Marathon swimming at the 2022 Asian Games – Women's 10 kilometre =

Women's 10 kilometre at the 2022 Asian Games
- Venue: Qiandao Lake
- Date: 6 October 2023
- Competitors: 13 from 8 nations

Medalists
gold medal	Wu Shutong	China
silver medal	Airi Ebina	Japan
bronze medal	Sun Jiake	China

The women's marathon swimming event at the 2022 Asian Games was held in Chun'an Jieshou Sports Centre Swimming Course, Qiandao Lake, Hangzhou on 6 October 2023.

== Schedule ==
All times are China Standard Time (UTC+08:00)

Date	Time	Event
Friday, 6 October 2023	08:30	Final

== Results ==
Rank	Athlete	Time
1st place, gold medalist(s)	Wu Shutong (CHN)	2:03:36.4
2nd place, silver medalist(s)	Airi Ebina (JPN)	2:03:44.9
3rd place, bronze medalist(s)	Sun Jiake (CHN)	2:03:57.9
4	Teng Yu-wen (TPE)	2:08:05.5
5	Chantal Liew (SGP)	2:08:12.3
6	Nip Tsz Yin (HKG)	2:08:13.1
7	Lee Hae-rim (KOR)	2:09:09.3
8	Lee Jeong-min (KOR)	2:09:53.7
9	Nikita Lam (HKG)	2:10:21.1
10	Diana Taszhanova (KAZ)	2:11:18.1
11	Mariya Fedotova (KAZ)	2:16:43.2
12	Pimpun Choopong (THA)	2:16:43.3
13	Thitirat Charoensup (THA)	2:19:40.6
