= Open water swimming at the 2022 European Aquatics Championships – Women's 25 km =

Women's 25 km at the 2022 European Aquatics Championships
- Venue: Ostia
- Dates: 20 August

Medalists
gold medal	Caroline Jouisse	France
silver medal	Barbara Pozzobon	Italy
bronze medal	Veronica Santoni	Italy

The Women's 25 km competition of the 2022 European Aquatics Championships were held on 20 August.

Swimmers were halted partway through the competition due to extreme weather and the event canceled. In November of the same year, LEN awarded medals and final rankings.

== Results ==
The race was started at 13:00.

Rank	Swimmer	Nationality	Time
1st place, gold medalist(s)	Caroline Jouisse	France	
2nd place, silver medalist(s)	Barbara Pozzobon	Italy	
3rd place, bronze medalist(s)	Veronica Santoni	Italy	
4	Lara Grangeon	France	
5	Lisa Pou	France	
6	Vivien Balogh	Hungary	
7	Silvia Ciccarella	Italy	
8	Elea Linka	Germany	
9	Luca Vas	Hungary	
