= Minami Niikura =

Japanese swimmer

Personal information
- Born: 2 March 1998 (age 28)

Sport
- Sport: Swimming

Minami Niikura (born 2 March 1998) is a Japanese swimmer. She represented Japan at the 2017 World Aquatics Championships in Budapest, Hungary and at the 2019 World Aquatics Championships in Gwangju, South Korea. In 2019, she competed in the women's 10 km event and she finished in 30th place.

She also competed in the women's 10 kilometre marathon at the 2017 Summer Universiade held in Taipei, Taiwan.
