= Slovenia at the 2013 World Aquatics Championships =

- Flag of Slovenia
- World Aquatics code: SLO
- National federation: Plavalna Zveza Slovenije
- Website: www.plavalna-zveza.si

in Barcelona, Spain
- Competitors: 2 in 1 sports
- Medals: Gold 0 Silver 0 Bronze 0 Total 0

World Aquatics Championships appearances
- 1994; 1998; 2001; 2003; 2005; 2007; 2009; 2011; 2013; 2015; 2017; 2019; 2022; 2023; 2024; 2025

Other related appearances
- Yugoslavia (1973–1991)

Slovenia is competing at the 2013 World Aquatics Championships in Barcelona, Spain between 19 July to 4 August 2013.

== Swimming ==
Slovenian swimmers earned qualifying standards in the following events (up to a maximum of 2 swimmers in each event at the A-standard entry time, and 1 at the B-standard):

Men

| Athlete | Event | Heat | | Semifinal | | Final | |
| Athlete | Event | Time | Rank | Time | Rank | Time | Rank |
|---|---|---|---|---|---|---|---|
| Damir Dugonjič | 50 m breaststroke | 27.48 | =11 Q | 26.83 =EU | 2 Q | 27.05 | 4 |
| Damir Dugonjič | 100 m breaststroke | 1:00.36 | 15 Q | 59.80 | 4 Q | 59.68 | 4 |

Women

| Athlete | Event | Heat | | Final | |
| Athlete | Event | Time | Rank | Time | Rank |
|---|---|---|---|---|---|
| Tjaša Oder | 400 m freestyle | 4:20.82 | 28 | did not advance | |
| Tjaša Oder | 800 m freestyle | 8:42.96 | 23 | did not advance | |
| Tjaša Oder | 1500 m freestyle | 16:35.96 | 17 | did not advance | |
