= Viktória Mihályvári-Farkas =

Hungarian swimmer (born 2003)

Personal information
- Nationality: Hungarian
- Born: 26 November 2003 (age 22) Budapest, Hungary

Sport
- Sport: Swimming
Medal record
Women's swimming
Representing Hungary
World Championships (LC)
Bronze medal – third place	2025 Singapore	Team open water
European Championships
Gold medal – first place	2022 Rome	400 m medley
Gold medal – first place	2025 Stari Grad	10 km open water
Gold medal – first place	2025 Stari Grad	Team open water
Silver medal – second place	2020 Budapest	400 m medley
Silver medal – second place	2022 Rome	1500 m freestyle
Silver medal – second place	2025 Stari Grad	5 km open water
Silver medal – second place	2026 Paris	10 km open water
Silver medal – second place	2026 Paris	5 km open water
Bronze medal – third place	2026 Paris	Team open water
European Junior Championships
Silver medal – second place	2019 Kazan	400 m medley
Bronze medal – third place	2019 Kazan	1500 m freestyle

Viktória Mihályvári-Farkas (born 26 November 2003) is a Hungarian swimmer who competes in both open water and long-distance pool events. She won a shared silver medal in the women's 400 metre individual medley event at the 2020 European Aquatics Championships, in Budapest, Hungary. She also competed in the women's 1500 metre freestyle event.
