= Moesha Johnson =

Australian swimmer (born 1997)

Personal information
- Nationality: Australian
- Born: 19 September 1997 (age 29) Tweed Heads, New South Wales

Sport
- Sport: Swimming
- Club: SC Magdeburg
- Coached by: Bernd Berkhahn
Medal record
Women's swimming
Representing Australia
Olympic Games
Silver medal – second place	2024 Paris	10 km open water
World Championships
Gold medal – first place	2024 Doha	4×1500 m mixed relay
Gold medal – first place	2025 Singapore	5 km open water
Gold medal – first place	2025 Singapore	10 km open water
Bronze medal – third place	2023 Fukuoka	4×1500 m mixed relay
Bronze medal – third place	2025 Singapore	3 km knockout sprint
Pan Pacific Championships
Gold medal – first place	2026 Irvine	10 km open water
Bronze medal – third place	2026 Irvine	1500 m freestyle

Moesha Johnson (born 19 September 1997) is an Australian swimmer. She won a silver medal in the 10km open swim at the 2024 Summer Olympics. She is the 2025 world champion in the 5km and 10km open water, and won the mixed 4×1500 metre relay at the 2024 World Championships.

== Early life ==
Johnson was born and raised in the Gold Coast-Tweed region and attended Palm Beach Currumbin State High School throughout her teenage years. For her undergraduate degree she completed the Bachelor of Biomedical Science degree at Southern Cross University at the Gold Coast campus. She began swimming at Coopers Aquatic Club in Burleigh Heads. She trains at Griffith University's Gold Coast campus under world renowned coach Michael Bohl.

== Career ==
Johnson competed at the 2022 World Championships in Budapest. She finished 4th in the 1500 metre freestyle and 9th in the 10km open water.

At the 2023 World Championships, Johnson won a bronze medal in the open water team event. She also competed at the 1500 metre freestyle, finishing 9th.

She was a gold medalist at the 2024 World Championships in the mixed 4×1500 metre relay. Australia finished ahead of the silver medalists Italy by 0.20 seconds. She also finished 4th in the 10km, thereby qualifying for the 2024 Summer Olympics.

At the 2024 Summer Olympics, Johnson competed in the 10km marathon. She led for the majority of the event, but could not hold off a late challenge from Sharon van Rouwendaal of the Netherlands. Johnson finished with the silver medal. Johnson also competed in the 1500 metre freestyle, where she finished 6th.

At the 2025 World Aquatics Championships in Singapore, Johnson won the gold medal in the 5km and 10km events. She competed in the inaugural 3 km knockout sprint event, winning the bronze medal.

At the 2026 Pan Pacific Swimming Championships in Long Beach, California, Johnson won the gold medal in the 10 km event.

== Awards and honours ==
- Swimming Australia Open Water Program Swimmer of the Year: 2024 & 2025
- World Aquatics Open Water Swimming Female Athlete of the Year: 2025
