= Linda Caponi =

Italian swimmer (born 1998)

Personal information
- Nationality: Italian
- Born: 22 December 1998 (age 27)

Sport
- Country: Italy
- Sport: Swimming
- Strokes: Freestyle
Medal record
Women's swimming
Representing Italy
European Championships
Bronze medal – third place	2022 Rome	4×200 m mixed freestyle
Bronze medal – third place	2026 Paris	10 km open water
World University Games
Silver medal – second place	2021 Chengdu	4×100 m mixed freestyle
Mediterranean Games
Gold medal – first place	2018 Tarragona	4×200 m freestyle
Bronze medal – third place	2018 Tarragona	200 m freestyle

Linda Caponi (born 22 December 1998) is an Italian swimmer.

== Career ==
Caponi competed at the 2018 Mediterranean Games and won a gold medal in the 4 × 200 metre freestyle relay and a bronze medal in the 200 metre freestyle.

In June 2026, she competed at the Italian Open Water Championships and finished in second place with a time 1:58:17.6 and qualified to represent Italy at the 2026 European Aquatics Championships. During the European Championships she won a bronze medal in the 10 km open water event with a time of 2:08:03.4.
