= Ginevra Taddeucci =

Italian swimmer (born 1997)

Personal information
- National team: Italy
- Born: 3 May 1997 (age 29) Florence, Italy

Sport
- Sport: Swimming
Medal record
Women's swimming
Representing Italy
Olympic Games
Bronze medal – third place	2024 Paris	10 km open water
World Championships
Gold medal – first place	2023 Fukuoka	Team open water
Silver medal – second place	2025 Singapore	5 km open water
Silver medal – second place	2025 Singapore	10 km open water
Silver medal – second place	2025 Singapore	3 km knockout sprints
Silver medal – second place	2025 Singapore	Team open water
Bronze medal – third place	2022 Budapest	Team open water
European Championships
Gold medal – first place	2022 Rome	Team open water
Gold medal – first place	2026 Paris	10 km open water
Gold medal – first place	2026 Paris	5 km open water
Silver medal – second place	2022 Rome	10 km open water
Silver medal – second place	2024 Belgrade	5 km open water
Silver medal – second place	2024 Belgrade	Team open water
Silver medal – second place	2026 Paris	Team open water
Bronze medal – third place	2026 Paris	3 km knockout sprints
European Open Water Championships
Gold medal – first place	2025 Stari Grad	5 km open water
Silver medal – second place	2025 Stari Grad	10 km open water
Silver medal – second place	2025 Stari Grad	Team relay

Ginevra Taddeucci (born 3 May 1997) is an Italian swimmer. She won a bronze medal in the 10 km open swim at the 2024 Paris Olympics.

== Career ==
She was a silver medalist at the 2024 European Aquatics Championships in the Women's 5 km open swim. She was also a silver medalist in the team event at the Championships, held in Serbia.

She competed at the 2024 Summer Olympics in Paris.

== Personal life ==
She was born in Florence, Italy, and lives in Lastra a Signa and used to train in Empoli.
