= Giulia Gabbrielleschi =

Italian swimmer (born 1996)

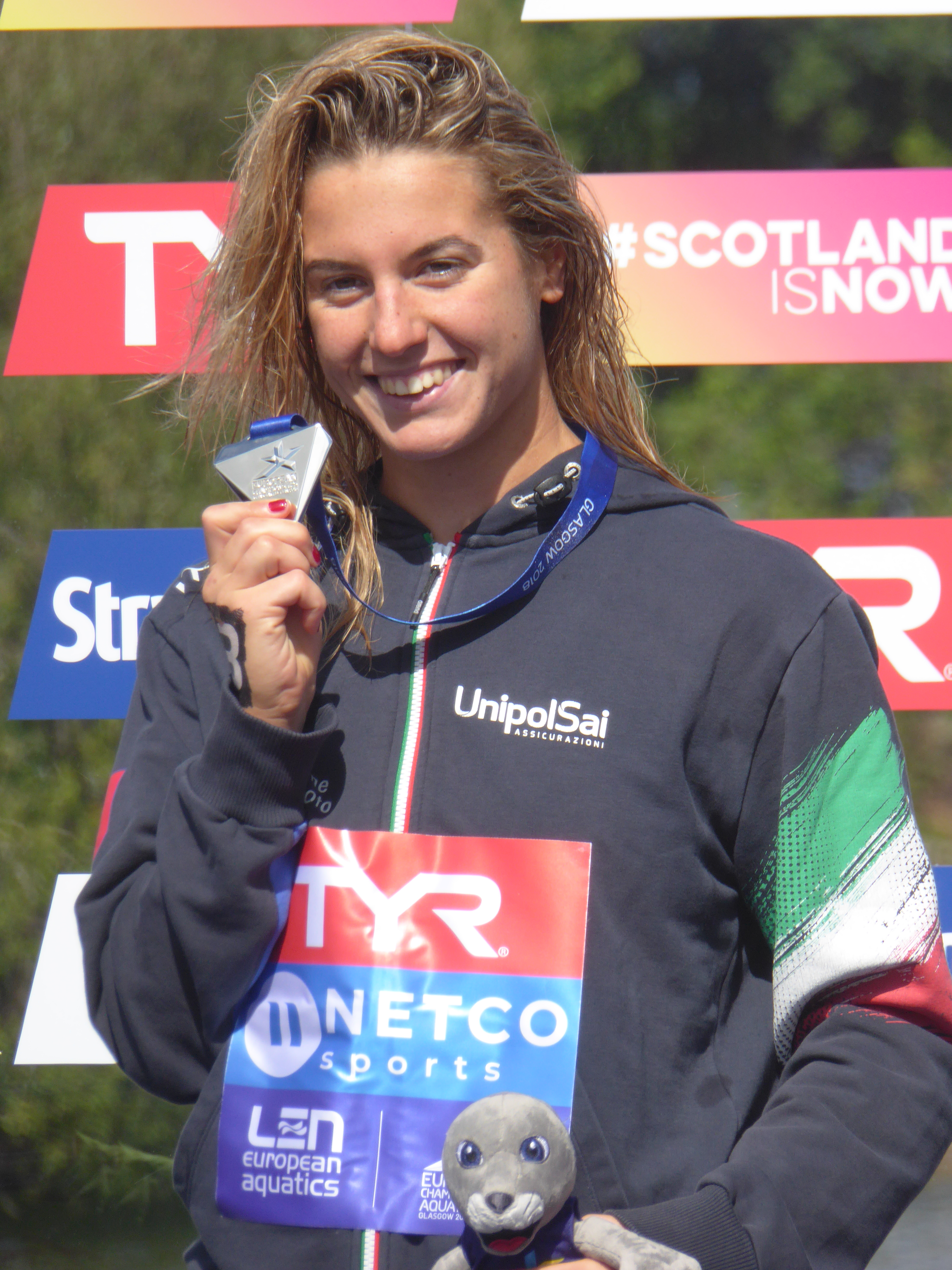
- Gabbrielleschi at the 2018 European Open Water Swimming Championships

Personal information
- National team: Italy
- Born: 25 July 1996 (age 29) Pistoia, Italy

Sport
- Sport: Swimming
- Strokes: Long-distance swimming
Medal record
Women's swimming
Representing Italy
World Championships
Silver medal – second place	2017 Budapest	Team event
Silver medal – second place	2019 Gwangju	Team event
Silver medal – second place	2024 Doha	Team event
Bronze medal – third place	2022 Budapest	5 km open water
Bronze medal – third place	2022 Budapest	Team event
European Championships
Gold medal – first place	2020 Budapest	Team relay
Silver medal – second place	2018 Glasgow	10 km open water
Silver medal – second place	2020 Budapest	5 km open water
Silver medal – second place	2024 Belgrade	Team relay
Silver medal – second place	2025 Stari Grad	Team Relay
Bronze medal – third place	2022 Rome	5 km open water
Bronze medal – third place	2024 Belgrade	10 km open water
Summer Universiade
Silver medal – second place	2017 Taipei	10 km open water

Giulia Gabbrielleschi (born 24 July 1996) is an Italian open water swimmer. She is a two-time individual silver medallist at the European Aquatics Championships, having placed second in the 10 km event in 2018 and second in the 5 km event in the 2020 championships, held in 2021.

== Career ==
Gabbrielleschi is an athlete of the Gruppo Sportivo Fiamme Oro.

Gabbrielleschi won a silver medal at the 2017 Summer Universiade, finishing behind Anna Olasz in the 10 km open water event.

Gabbrielleschi won a silver medal at the 2018 European Aquatics Championships, finishing seven seconds behind winner Sharon van Rouwendaal of the Netherlands in the 10 km open water competition.

In 2019, she represented Italy at the 2019 World Aquatics Championships held in Gwangju, South Korea. She competed in the women's 800 metre freestyle and women's 1500 metre freestyle events. In both events she did not advance to the final. Two years later, at the 2020 European Aquatics Championships held in 2021 due to the COVID-19 pandemic, she won the silver medal in the 5 kilometre open water swim with a time of 58 minutes and 49.3 seconds, which was less than five seconds slower than gold medalist Sharon van Rouwendaal.

At the 2022 World Aquatics Championships, in Budapest, Hungary, Gabbrielleschi won a bronze medal as part of the 6 kilometre team event. She also won a bronze medal in the 5 kilometre open water swim with a time of 57 minutes and 54.9 seconds, finishing only behind Ana Marcela Cunha of Brazil and Aurélie Muller of France. Two months later, at the 2022 European Aquatics Championships in Rome, she won the bronze medal in the 5 kilometre open water swim with a time of 57:00.3, finishing 1.6 seconds behind gold medalist Sharon van Rouwendaal and 0.1 seconds behind silver medalist María de Valdés of Spain.
