= Lea Boy =

German open water swimmer (born 2000)

Personal information
- Nationality: German
- Born: 24 January 2000 (age 26)

Sport
- Country: Germany
- Sport: Open water swimming
- Event: 5 km
- Club: SV Würzburg 05
Medal record
Women's swimming
Representing Germany
World Championships
| Gold medal – first place | 2019 Gwangju | Team event |
| Gold medal – first place | 2022 Budapest | Team event |
| Silver medal – second place | 2022 Budapest | 25 km open water |
European Championships
| Gold medal – first place | 2020 Budapest | 25 km open water |
| Silver medal – second place | 2020 Budapest | Team relay |
| Silver medal – second place | 2024 Belgrade | 25 km open water |
| Bronze medal – third place | 2025 Stari Grad | 3 km open water |
| Bronze medal – third place | 2025 Stari Grad | 10 km open water |

Lea Boy (born 24 January 2000) is a German open water swimmer.

In 2018, she finished in 12th place in the women's 5 km at the 2018 European Aquatics Championships.

She participated at the 2019 World Aquatics Championships, winning a medal.

In 2019, she represented the Germany at the 2019 World Aquatics Championships in Gwangju, South Korea. She competed in the women's 25 km event and she finished in 12th place.
