= Océane Cassignol =

French open water swimmer

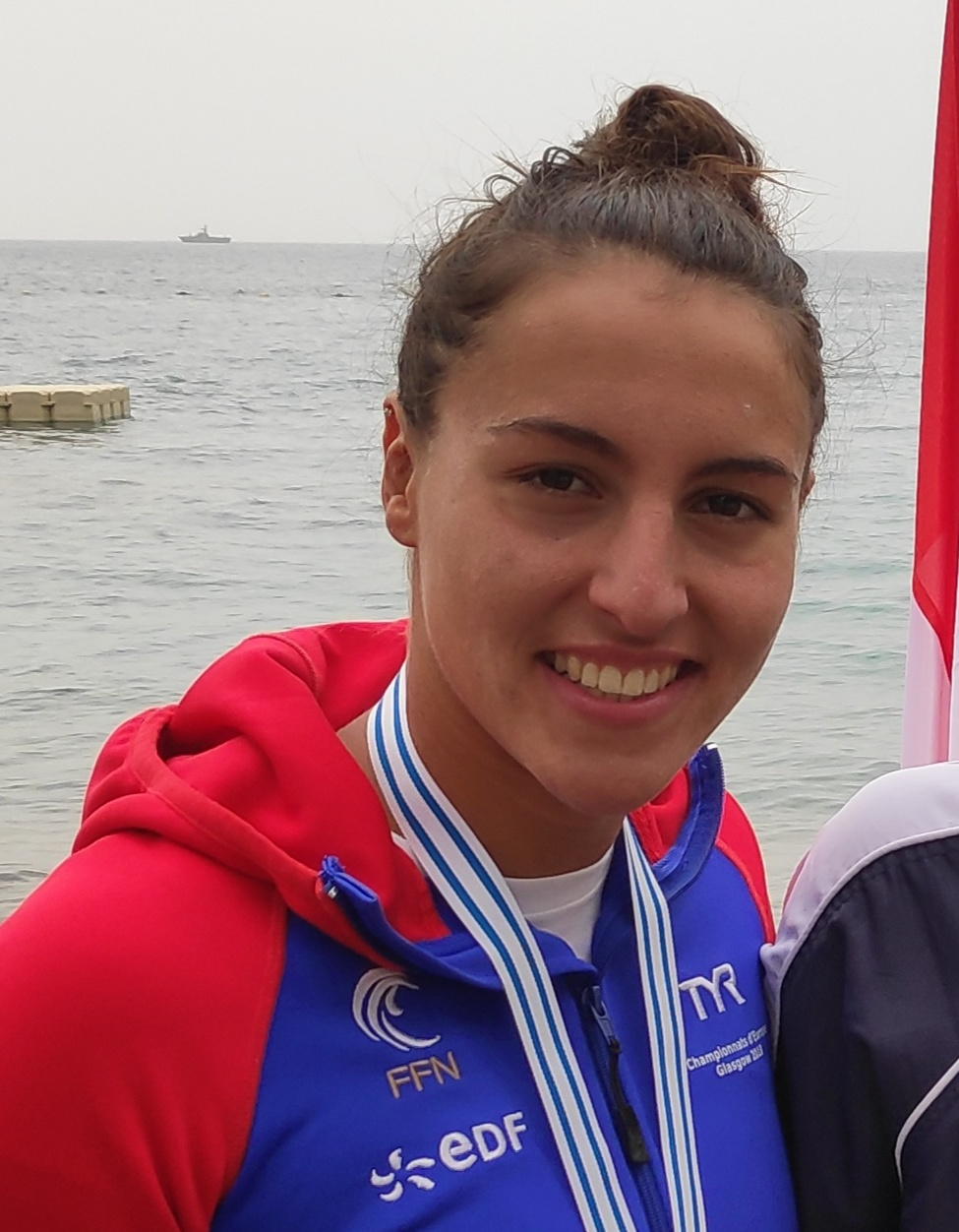

Personal information
- Nationality: French
- Born: 26 May 2000 (age 26) Beziers, France

Sport
- Country: France
- Sport: Open water swimming
- Club: Dunkerque Natation
Medal record
Women's swimming
Representing France
World Championships
Gold medal – first place	2017 Budapest	Team relay
European Championships
Bronze medal – third place	2020 Budapest	5 km open water
Bronze medal – third place	2024 Belgrade	Team relay

Océane Cassignol (born 26 May 2000) is a French open water swimmer. She represented France at the 2024 Summer Olympics.

== Career ==
Cassignol made her debut at the 2017 World Aquatics Championships in Budapest, and won a gold medal in the team relay.

At the 2020 European Aquatics Championships held in 2021 due to the COVID-19 pandemic, she won a bronze medal in the 5 km open water event with a time of 58:51.4.

In February 2024 she competed at the 2024 World Aquatics Championships in Doha, and finished in fifth place in the 5 km open water event and 16th place in the 10 km open water event. With her results at the World Championships, she qualified to represent France at the 2024 Summer Olympics. She competed in the 10 km open water marathon and finished in seventh place with a time of 2:06:06.9.
