= Bettina Fábián =

Hungarian swimmer (born 2004)

Personal information
- Nickname: Betty
- National team: Hungary
- Born: 13 December 2004 (age 21) Szeged, Hungary
- Home town: Budapest, Hungary

Sport
- Sport: Swimming
- Club: Szeged Úszó Egylet Club; Ferencvárosi Torna Club
Medal record
Women's swimming
Representing Hungary
World Championships
Silver medal – second place	2023 Fukuoka	Team relay
Bronze medal – third place	2024 Doha	Team relay
Bronze medal – third place	2025 Singapore	3 km knockout sprints
Bronze medal – third place	2025 Singapore	Team open water
European Championships
Gold medal – first place	2024 Belgrade	Team relay
Gold medal – first place	2025 Stari Grad	3 km open water
Gold medal – first place	2025 Stari Grad	Team relay
Silver medal – second place	2026 Paris	3 km knockout sprints
Bronze medal – third place	2024 Belgrade	5 km open water
Bronze medal – third place	2026 Paris	Team open water
European Junior Championships
Gold medal – first place	2021 Rome	4×200 m freestyle
Silver medal – second place	2021 Rome	400 m freestyle

Bettina Fábián (born 13 December 2004) is a Hungarian swimmer who specializes in open water swimming. She represented Hungary at the 2024 Summer Olympics.

== Early life ==
Fábián was born and raised in Szeged, where she competed and trained with the local Szeged Úszó Egylet Club. She moved to Budapest, Hungary in 2021 to train with the Ferencvárosi Torna Club. She briefly swam for North Carolina State University in the fall of 2024, where she was managed and trained by head coach Braden Holloway. When the university was unable to train her and Hungarian teammate David Betlehem with a greater focus on distance swimming, she and Betlehem left the university in the fall of 2024 to pursue training more focused on long-distance events, though she had planned to return to the university in January 2025.

== Career ==
At the 2021 European Junior Swimming Championships in Rome, in July 2021, Fábián won a gold medal in the 4×200 metre freestyle relay, and a silver medal in the 400 metre freestyle, with a time of 4:10.16.

In September, at the 2022 World Junior Open Water Swimming Championships in Seychelles, she won the gold medal in the 10 kilometre open water swim with a time of 2:03:11.4.

In January 2023, she committed to swim at NC State. In July 2023, she competed at the 2023 World Aquatics Championships in Fukuoka, and won a silver medal in the team relay with a time of 1:10:35.3.

In February 2024, she competed at the 2024 World Aquatics Championships in Doha, and won a bronze medal in the team relay with a time of 1:04:06.8. She then competed at the 2024 European Aquatics Championships in Belgrade in June 2024, and won a gold medal in the team relay and a bronze medal in the 5 km open water event. In August 2024, she represented Hungary at the 2024 Summer Olympics in Paris and finished in fifth place in the 10 km open water marathon with a time of 2:04.16.9.

In July 2025, she competed at the 2025 World Aquatics Championships in Singapore and won bronze medals in the 3 km knockout sprints and team open water events.

In August 2026, she competed at 2026 European Aquatics Championships in Paris and won a silver medal in the 3 km knockout sprint and a bronze medal in the mixed team relay.

== Personal life ==
Her sister, Fanni Fábián, is also a swimmer.
