= María de Valdés =

Spanish swimmer (born 1998)

Personal information
- Full name: María de Valdés Álvarez
- Nationality: Spanish
- Born: 19 October 1998 (age 27) Fuengirola, Spain

Sport
- Sport: Swimming
- Strokes: Freestyle
Medal record
Women's swimming
Representing Spain
World Championships
| Silver medal – second place | 2024 Doha | 10 km open water |
European Championships (LC)
| Silver medal – second place | 2022 Rome | 5 km open water |
| Bronze medal – third place | 2025 Stari Grad | 5 km open water |

María de Valdés Álvarez (Note: In this Spanish name, the first or paternal surname is de Valdés and the second or maternal family name is Álvarez.) (born 19 October 1998) is a Spanish swimmer. She competed in the women's 1500 metre freestyle event at the 2020 European Aquatics Championships, in Budapest, Hungary. She took second place for women's 5 kilometers open water swimming at 2022 European Aquatics Championships in Rome, Italy.
