= Caroline Jouisse =

French swimmer (born 1994)

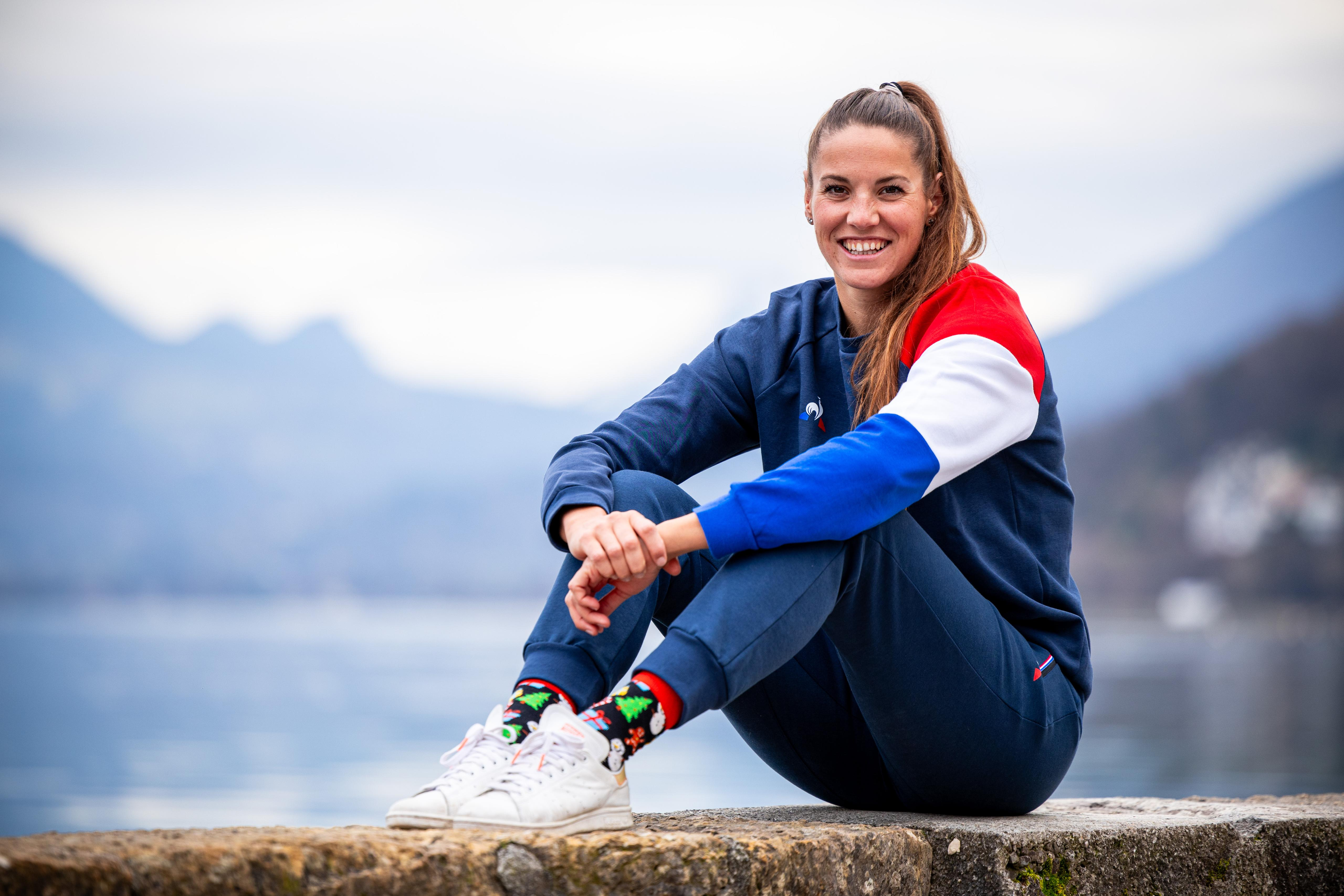

Personal information
- Born: 26 May 1994 (age 32)

Sport
- Country: France
- Sport: Swimming
Medal record
Women's swimming
Representing France
European Aquatics Championships
Gold medal – first place	2022 Rome	25 km open water
Bronze medal – third place	2024 Belgrade	Team relay
European Open Water Championships
Bronze medal – third place	2016 Hoorn	25 km open water

Caroline Jouisse (born 26 May 1994) is a French swimmer. She swam collegiately at Delta State University. She participated at the 2016 European Open Water Championships, being awarded the bronze medal in the women's 25 kilometer event. Jouisse participated at the 2022 World Aquatics Championships in the open water swimming competition, winning no medal. In August of 2022, she won the European title and gold medal in the 25 kilometre open water swim at the 2022 European Aquatics Championships in Rome, Italy.
