= Špela Perše =

Slovenian swimmer (born 1996)

Personal information
- Born: 4 August 1996 (age 30) Bled, Slovenia
- Height: 158 cm (5 ft 2 in)
- Weight: 50 kg (110 lb)

Sport
- Sport: Swimming

Špela Perše (born 4 August 1996) is a Slovenian swimmer. She competed in the women's marathon 10 kilometre event at the 2016 Summer Olympics.

In 2019, she competed in the women's 5 km and women's 10 km events at the World Aquatics Championships held in Gwangju, South Korea. In the 5 km event she finished in 16th place and in the 10 km event she finished in 27th place.
