= 2018 FINA Marathon Swim World Series =

International swimming competition

The 2018 FINA Marathon Swim World Series, also known as the FINA/HOSA Marathon Swim World Series for sponsorship reasons, took place from 17 March to 9 November 2018. It was the 12th edition of the FINA-sanctioned series, and included eight events.

== Calendar ==
The calendar for the 2018 series, announced by FINA.

Date	Location
March 17	(Qatar) Doha
May 20	Beau Vallon Beach, Seychelles
June 9	(Portugal) Setúbal
June 16	(Hungary) Balatonfüred
July 26	(Canada) Lac Saint-Jean, Quebec
August 11	(Canada) Lac Mégantic, Quebec
September 16	(China) Qiandao Lake, Chun'an
November 9	(United Arab Emirates) Abu Dhabi

== Medal summary ==
=== Men ===
Event	Gold	Silver	Bronze
Doha	Ferry Weertman (NED)	David Aubry (FRA)	Simone Ruffini (ITA)
Seychelles	Simone Ruffini (ITA)	Jack Burnell (GBR)	Rob Muffels (GER)
Setúbal	Kristóf Rasovszky (HUN)	Mario Sanzullo (ITA)	Jack Burnell (GBR)
Balatonfüred	Florian Wellbrock (GER)	Ferry Weertman (NED)	Axel Reymond (FRA)
Lac Saint-Jean	Marcel Schouten (NED)	Fernando Ponte (BRA)	Diogo Villarinho (BRA)
Lac Mégantic	Christian Reichert (GER)	Dario Verani (ITA)	Fernando Ponte (BRA)
Chun'an	Jack Burnell (GBR)	Rob Muffels (GER)	Gregorio Paltrinieri (ITA)
Abu Dhabi	Florian Wellbrock (GER)	Gregorio Paltrinieri (ITA)	Kristóf Rasovszky (HUN)

=== Women ===
Event	Gold	Silver	Bronze
Doha	Sharon van Rouwendaal (NED)	Leonie Beck (GER)	Finnia Wunram (GER)
Seychelles	Arianna Bridi (ITA)	Ana Marcela Cunha (BRA)	Martina De Memme (ITA)
Setúbal	Haley Anderson (USA)	Sharon van Rouwendaal (NED)	Kareena Lee (AUS)
Balatonfüred	Ana Marcela Cunha (BRA)	Haley Anderson (USA)	Rachele Bruni (ITA)
Lac Saint-Jean	Ana Marcela Cunha (BRA)	Viviane Jungblut (BRA)	Samantha Arévalo (ECU)
Lac Mégantic	Xin Xin (CHN)	Rachele Bruni (ITA)	Samantha Arévalo (ECU)
Chun'an	Xin Xin (CHN)	Leonie Beck (GER)	Ana Marcela Cunha (BRA)
Abu Dhabi	Arianna Bridi (ITA)	Rachele Bruni (ITA)	Ana Marcela Cunha (BRA)

=== Medal table ===
Rank	Nation	Gold	Silver	Bronze	Total
1	Italy (ITA)	3	5	4	12
2	Germany (GER)	3	3	2	8
3	Netherlands (NED)	3	2	0	5
4	Brazil (BRA)	2	3	4	9
5	China (CHN)	2	0	0	2
6	Great Britain (GBR)	1	1	1	3
7	United States (USA)	1	1	0	2
8	Hungary (HUN)	1	0	1	2
9	France (FRA)	0	1	1	2
10	Ecuador (ECU)	0	0	2	2
11	Australia (AUS)	0	0	1	1
Totals (11 entries)		16	16	16	48

== Results ==
The top ten finishers in each event.

=== Doha ===
Men

Rank	Name	Time
1st place, gold medalist(s)	Ferry Weertman (NED)	1:52:41.6
2nd place, silver medalist(s)	David Aubry (FRA)	1:52:42.5
3rd place, bronze medalist(s)	Simone Ruffini (ITA)	1:52:42.7
4	Axel Reymond (FRA)	1:52:43.0
5	Gregorio Paltrinieri (ITA)	1:52:43.1
6	Matteo Furlan (ITA)	1:52:44.0
7	Andreas Waschburger (GER)	1:52:46.8
8	Rob Muffels (GER)	1:52:47.0
9	Logan Fontaine (FRA)	1:52:48.9
10	Yasunari Hirai (JPN)	1:53:07.6

Women

Rank	Name	Time
1st place, gold medalist(s)	Sharon van Rouwendaal (NED)	2:02:24.4
2nd place, silver medalist(s)	Leonie Beck (GER)	2:02:25.2
3rd place, bronze medalist(s)	Finnia Wunram (GER)	2:02:26.7
4	Ana Marcela Cunha (BRA)	2:02:26.8
5	Martina De Memme (ITA)	2:02:26.9
6	Chelsea Gubecka (AUS)	2:02:28.0
7	Arianna Bridi (ITA)	2:02:28.3
8	Océane Cassignol (FRA)	2:02:30.8
9	Rachele Bruni (ITA)	2:02:31.4
10	Giulia Gabbrielleschi (ITA)	2:02:32.0

=== Seychelles ===
Men

Rank	Name	Time
1st place, gold medalist(s)	Simone Ruffini (ITA)	1:49:41.9
2nd place, silver medalist(s)	Jack Burnell (GBR)	1:49:44.0
3rd place, bronze medalist(s)	Rob Muffels (GER)	1:49:46.3
4	Andrea Manzi (ITA)	1:49:46.4
4	Ferry Weertman (NED)	1:49:46.4
6	Matteo Furlan (ITA)	1:49:47.0
7	Mario Sanzullo (ITA)	1:49:47.1
8	Andreas Waschburger (GER)	1:49:48.3
9	Christian Reichert (GER)	1:49:49.0
10	Marcel Schouten (NED)	1:49:50.5

Women

Rank	Name	Time
1st place, gold medalist(s)	Arianna Bridi (ITA)	1:58:32.3
2nd place, silver medalist(s)	Ana Marcela Cunha (BRA)	1:58:32.6
3rd place, bronze medalist(s)	Martina De Memme (ITA)	1:58:33.4
4	Leonie Beck (GER)	1:58:35.5
5	Rachele Bruni (ITA)	1:58:35.6
6	Sharon van Rouwendaal (NED)	1:58:36.5
7	Viviane Jungblut (BRA)	1:58:37.0
8	Xin Xin (CHN)	1:58:37.6
9	Giulia Gabbrielleschi (ITA)	1:58:38.0
10	Alice Dearing (GBR)	1:58:38.9

=== Setúbal ===
Men

Rank	Name	Time
1st place, gold medalist(s)	Kristóf Rasovszky (HUN)	1:55:57.53
2nd place, silver medalist(s)	Mario Sanzullo (ITA)	1:56:22.33
3rd place, bronze medalist(s)	Jack Burnell (GBR)	1:56:23.22
4	Ferry Weertman (NED)	1:56:29.02
5	Matteo Furlan (ITA)	1:56:38.01
6	Marcel Schouten (NED)	1:56:39.96
7	Pepijn Smits (NED)	1:56:41.46
8	Simone Ruffini (ITA)	1:56:42.00
9	Alberto Martínez Murcia (ESP)	1:56:42.10
10	Nicholas Sloman (AUS)	1:56:42.38

Women

Rank	Name	Time
1st place, gold medalist(s)	Haley Anderson (USA)	2:05:18.89
2nd place, silver medalist(s)	Sharon van Rouwendaal (NED)	2:05:20.26
3rd place, bronze medalist(s)	Kareena Lee (AUS)	2:05:22.25
4	Finnia Wunram (GER)	2:05:27.87
5	Rachele Bruni (ITA)	2:05:50.23
6	Leonie Beck (GER)	2:05:50.75
7	Ana Marcela Cunha (BRA)	2:05:55.19
8	Angela Maurer (GER)	2:06:04.70
9	Giulia Gabbrielleschi (ITA)	2:06:21.45
10	Chase Travis (USA)	2:06:57.08

=== Balatonfüred ===
Men

Rank	Name	Time
1st place, gold medalist(s)	Florian Wellbrock (GER)	1:55:40.2
2nd place, silver medalist(s)	Ferry Weertman (NED)	1:55:57.0
3rd place, bronze medalist(s)	Axel Reymond (FRA)	1:55:59.1
4	Tobias Robinson (GBR)	1:56:01.8
5	Matteo Furlan (ITA)	1:56:02.0
6	Nicholas Sloman (AUS)	1:56:02.5
7	Matan Roditi (ISR)	1:56:03.9
8	Jack Burnell (GBR)	1:56:08.0
9	Esteban Enderica (ECU)	1:56:19.2
10	Simone Ruffini (ITA)	1:56:20.4

Women

Rank	Name	Time
1st place, gold medalist(s)	Ana Marcela Cunha (BRA)	2:05:53.1
2nd place, silver medalist(s)	Haley Anderson (USA)	2:05:53.4
3rd place, bronze medalist(s)	Rachele Bruni (ITA)	2:05:54.7
4	Giulia Gabbrielleschi (ITA)	2:05:56.8
5	Kareena Lee (AUS)	2:05:57.0
6	Angélica Maria (POR)	2:06:05.0
7	Finnia Wunram (GER)	2:06:07.3
8	Martina De Memme (ITA)	2:06:08.6
9	Sharon van Rouwendaal (NED)	2:06:15.5
10	Samantha Arévalo (ECU)	2:06:16.4
