= Dario Verani =

Italian swimmer (born 1995)

Personal information
- National team: Italy
- Born: 1 January 1995 (age 31) Cecina, Italy
- Height: 181 cm (5 ft 11 in)
- Weight: 80 kg (176 lb)

Sport
- Sport: Open water swimming
- Events: 5 km, 10 km, 25 km
- Club: Centro Sportivo Esercito
Medal record
Men's open water swimming
Representing Italy
Event	1st	2nd	3rd
World Championships	1	0	0
European Championships	1	1	1
Pan Pacific Championships	0	0	1
Mediterranean Beach Games	2	0	0
Total	4	1	2
World Championships
Gold medal – first place	2022 Budapest	25 km open water
European Championships
Gold medal – first place	2024 Belgrade	25 km open water
Silver medal – second place	2022 Rome	25 km open water
Bronze medal – third place	2020 Budapest	5 km open water
Pan Pacific Championships
Bronze medal – third place	2026 Long Beach	10 km open water
Mediterranean Beach Games
Gold medal – first place	2015 Pescara	5 km open water
Gold medal – first place	2015 Pescara	team relay

Dario Verani (born 1 January 1995) is an Italian competitive open water swimmer. At the 2022 World Aquatics Championships, he won the world title and gold medal in the 25 kilometre open water swim. He won the silver medal in the 25 kilometre open water swim at the 2022 European Aquatics Championships and the bronze medal in the 5 kilometre open water swim at the 2020 European Aquatics Championships. He was champion in the 5 kilometre open water swim at the inaugural Mediterranean Beach Games in 2015.

== Career ==
=== 2015 Mediterranean Beach Games ===
At the 2015 Mediterranean Beach Games, held in Pescara in the summer, Verani won his first gold medal in the 5 kilometer open water swim with a time of 56 minutes and 8.2 seconds. He won his second gold medal in the open water mixed 5 kilometre team relay event, helping finish ahead of the silver medal team, also from Italy, and the bronze medal team from Croatia.

=== 2018–2021 ===
For the 2018 FINA Marathon Swim World Series leg held at Lake Mégantic in Canada in August, Verani won the silver medal in the 10 kilometre swim with a time of 1:56:52.90, finishing just 0.40 seconds behind gold medalist Christian Reichert of Germany. The following year, he won the bronze medal in the 10 kilometre swim at the 2019 FINA Marathon Swim World Series leg number five, held at Lac Saint-Jean in Canada in July, finishing in a time of 1:53:44.59. Later in the World Series, at leg number six held at Lake Mégantic in Canada in August, he finished behind Kristóf Rasovszky of Hungary in the 10 kilometre swim with a time of 2:06:48.10 to win the silver medal.

In 2021, at the 2020 European Aquatics Championships, held in Budapest, Hungary and postponed one year due to the COVID-19 pandemic, Verani won the bronze medal in the 5 kilometer open water swim with a time of 55 minutes and 46.6 seconds, which was 3.3 seconds slower than gold medalist Gregorio Paltrinieri of Italy and 1.5 seconds slower than silver medalist Marc-Antoine Olivier of France.

=== 2022 World Aquatics Championships ===
2022 World Aquatics Championships
Gold medal – first place	25 km open water	5:02:21.5

Leading up to the 2022 World Aquatics Championships, Verani gained competition experience at the first leg of the 2022 FINA Marathon Swim World Series, held in Setúbal, Portugal at Albarquel in May, placing fifth in the 10 kilometre swim with a time of 1 hour, 53 minutes, and 59.20 seconds. On the final day of open water swimming competition at the World Championships the following month, he won the gold medal in the 25 kilometre open water swim with a time of 5 hours, 2 minutes, and 21.5 seconds. He finished 1.2 seconds ahead of 2017 and 2019 World champion in the event, Axel Reymond of France, pulling ahead of the Frenchman in the last 100 metres of the race. Following the completion of the World Championships, FINA removed the 25 kilometre open water swim from the 2023 World Aquatics Championships. The discontinuation of the event was expanded by World Aquatics beyond the 2023 World Championships in April 2023 to other future editions of the World Aquatics Championships.

Verani returned to competition post-world title win nine days later at the second leg of the 2022 Marathon Swim World Series, held in Paris, France at Parc de la Villette, placing eleventh in the 10 kilometre swim with a time of 1:51:50.30. The following day, he won a gold medal as part of the 4×1500 metre team relay, helping finish in a time of 1:07:51.74.

=== 2022 European Aquatics Championships ===
At the 2022 European Aquatics Championships, in the 25 kilometre open water swim, Verani and the other athletes had their results delayed due to critical race conditions, including waves that caused judges to interrupt the athletes during competition, which impacted the ease of processing results for the event because of unanticipated stopping and potential starting (delayed continuation) of athletes during racing. Ultimately, the event was canceled and the decision to award no medals was made by the judges due to the stop of the competitors around the 19 to 20 kilometre mark, the judges not being able to determine an order of arrival and deciding to not let the swimmers start again where they left off to continue on and finish the race. Following external review of the race ending approximately three months later, in November, LEN decided to award medals and rankings, which included Verani winning the silver medal and helping to achieve a sweep of all medals in the event by Italian swimmers with Mario Sanzullo winning the gold medal and Matteo Furlan winning the bronze medal.

=== 2022 World Series conclusion ===
Seven days later, Verani swam the 10 kilometre open water swim in a time of 1:51:15.33 at the third leg of the 2022 Marathon Swim World Series, held in Lac-Mégantic, Canada, placing seventh. In November, he won a bronze medal in the 4×1500 metre mixed open water relay at the fifth and final leg of the World Series, held in Eilat, Israel, helping achieve a finish in 1:06:37.00. The second of two days, he finished with a time of 1:46:49.70 in the 10 kilometre open water swim, placing seventh. Based on his results in his individual events for the whole World Series, Verani earned a total of 1500 points, tying Nicholas Sloman of Australia for sixth in terms of overall highest-scoring male competitors.

=== 2023 ===
On day one of the 2023 Italian National Championships in Riccione, and conducted in long course metres, Verani ranked seventeenth in the 400 metre freestyle preliminaries with a personal best time of 3:56.37. He competed in the evening b-final of the event as well, placing seventh within the final with a personal best time of 3:56.16. For the 800 metre freestyle on the third day, he completed the race in a time of 8:07.88 and was not classified as he competed in series 3. Concluding the Championships with the 1500 metre freestyle on the fifth and final day, he placed eleventh with a personal best time of 15:25.88.

=== 2026 ===
With Europeans swimmers permitted to compete in the open water events at the 2026 Pan Pacific Swimming Championships, Verani won bronze in the 10 km event.

== International championships ==
Meet	5 kilometre	25 kilometre	open water team relay
MBG 2015	1st place, gold medalist(s)	—N/a	1st place, gold medalist(s)
EC 2020	3rd place, bronze medalist(s)		
WC 2022		1st place, gold medalist(s)	
EC 2022		2nd place, silver medalist(s)	

== Marathon Swim World Series circuits ==
Verani has won the following medals at Marathon Swim World Series circuits.

Edition	Individual			Relay			Total
Edition	Gold	Silver	Bronze	Gold	Silver	Bronze	Total
2018	0	1	0	–	–	–	1
2019	0	1	1	–	–	–	2
2022	0	0	0	1	0	1	2
Total	0	2	1	1	0	1	5

== Personal best times ==
=== Long course metres (50 m pool) ===
Event	Time		Meet	Location	Date	Ref
400 m freesyle	3:56.16	b	2023 Italian National Championships	Riccione	13 April 2023	
800 m freesyle	8:06.82		2021 Italian National Summer Championships	Rome	7 August 2021	
1500 m freesyle	15:25.88		2023 Italian National Spring Championships	Riccione	17 April 2023	

Legend: b – b-final

== Awards and honours ==
- Veterans of Sport & Cecina, Athlete of the Year: 2022 (awarded November 2022)
