= 2019 FINA Marathon Swim World Series =

International swimming competition

The 2019 FINA Marathon Swim World Series took place from 16 February to 29 September 2019. It was the 13th edition of the FINA-sanctioned series, and included nine events.

== Calendar ==
The calendar for the 2019 series, announced by FINA.

| Date | Location |
|---|---|
| February 16 | (Qatar) Doha |
| May 12 | Beau Vallon Beach, Seychelles |
| June 8 | (Portugal) Setúbal |
| June 15 | (Hungary) Balatonfüred |
| July 21 | (Canada) Lac Saint-Jean, Quebec |
| August 3 | (Canada) Lac Mégantic, Quebec |
| August 28 | (North Macedonia) Ohrid |
| September 7 | Chinese Taipei |
| September 29 | (China) Chun'an |

== Medal summary ==
=== Men ===
| Event | Gold | Silver | Bronze |
|---|---|---|---|
| Doha | Florian Wellbrock (GER) | Kristóf Rasovszky (HUN) | Jordan Wilimovsky (USA) |
| Seychelles | Marc-Antoine Olivier (FRA) | Nicholas Sloman (AUS) | Kristóf Rasovszky (HUN) |
| Setúbal | Yohsuke Miyamoto (JPN) | Andreas Waschburger (GER) | Alejandro Moreno (ARG) |
| Balatonfüred | Kristóf Rasovszky (HUN) | Ferry Weertman (NED) | Sören Meißner (GER) |
| Lac Saint-Jean | Kristóf Rasovszky (HUN) | Fares Zitouni (FRA) | Dario Verani (ITA) |
| Lac Mégantic | Kristóf Rasovszky (HUN) | Dario Verani (ITA) | Fan Hau-Li (CAN) |
| Ohrid | Kirill Abrosimov (RUS) | Axel Reymond (FRA) | Matteo Furlan (ITA) |
| Chinese Taipei | Nicholas Sloman (AUS) | Hayden Cotter (AUS) | Matteo Furlan (ITA) |
| Chun'an | Ferry Weertman (NED) | Matteo Furlan (ITA) | Kirill Abrosimov (RUS) |

=== Women ===
| Event | Gold | Silver | Bronze |
|---|---|---|---|
| Doha | Ana Marcela Cunha (BRA) | Kareena Lee (AUS) | Rachele Bruni (ITA) |
| Seychelles | Arianna Bridi (ITA) | Ana Marcela Cunha (BRA) | Lara Grangeon (FRA) |
| Setúbal | Ana Marcela Cunha (BRA) | Rachele Bruni (ITA) | Samantha Arévalo (ECU) |
| Balatonfüred | Ana Marcela Cunha (BRA) | Arianna Bridi (ITA) | Leonie Beck (GER) |
| Lac Saint-Jean | Rachele Bruni (ITA) | Anna Olasz (HUN) | Caroline Jouisse (FRA) |
| Lac Mégantic | Arianna Bridi (ITA) | Rachele Bruni (ITA) | Anna Olasz (HUN) |
| Ohrid | Ana Marcela Cunha (BRA) | Rachele Bruni (ITA) | Arianna Bridi (ITA) |
| Chinese Taipei | Ana Marcela Cunha (BRA) | Arianna Bridi (ITA) | Rachele Bruni (ITA) |
| Chun'an | Arianna Bridi (ITA) | Ana Marcela Cunha (BRA) | Xin Xin (CHN) |

=== Medal table ===
| Rank | Nation | Gold | Silver | Bronze | Total |
|---|---|---|---|---|---|
| 1 | Brazil (BRA) | 5 | 2 | 0 | 7 |
| 2 | Italy (ITA) | 4 | 7 | 6 | 17 |
| 3 | Hungary (HUN) | 3 | 2 | 2 | 7 |
| 4 | Australia (AUS) | 1 | 3 | 0 | 4 |
| 5 | France (FRA) | 1 | 2 | 2 | 5 |
| 6 | Germany (GER) | 1 | 1 | 2 | 4 |
| 7 | Netherlands (NED) | 1 | 1 | 0 | 2 |
| 8 | Russia (RUS) | 1 | 0 | 1 | 2 |
| 9 | Japan (JPN) | 1 | 0 | 0 | 1 |
| 10 | Argentina (ARG) | 0 | 0 | 1 | 1 |
| 10 | Canada (CAN) | 0 | 0 | 1 | 1 |
| 10 | China (CHN) | 0 | 0 | 1 | 1 |
| 10 | Ecuador (ECU) | 0 | 0 | 1 | 1 |
| 10 | United States (USA) | 0 | 0 | 1 | 1 |
| Totals (14 entries) | | 18 | 18 | 18 | 54 |
