= Open water swimming at the 2020 European Aquatics Championships – Men's 10 km =

Men's 10 km at the 2020 European Aquatics Championships
- Venue: Lupa Lake
- Dates: 13 May 2021
- Competitors: 33 from 18 nations
- Winning time: 1:51:30.6

Medalists
gold medal	Gregorio Paltrinieri	Italy
silver medal	Marc-Antoine Olivier	France
bronze medal	Florian Wellbrock	Germany

The Men's 10 km competition of the 2020 European Aquatics Championships was held on 13 May 2021.

== Results ==
The race was held at 14:00.

Rank	Swimmer	Nationality	Time
1st place, gold medalist(s)	Gregorio Paltrinieri	Italy	1:51:30.6
2nd place, silver medalist(s)	Marc-Antoine Olivier	France	1:51:41.7
3rd place, bronze medalist(s)	Florian Wellbrock	Germany	1:51:42.0
4	Ferry Weertman	Netherlands	1:51:43.0
5	Kristóf Rasovszky	Hungary	1:51:45.0
6	Mario Sanzullo	Italy	1:51:46.4
7	Axel Reymond	France	1:51:49.6
8	Hector Pardoe	Great Britain	1:51:55.4
9	Domenico Acerenza	Italy	1:51:55.9
10	Alberto Martínez	Spain	1:51:56.0
11	Daniel Székelyi	Hungary	1:52:04.7
12	Oliver Klemet	Germany	1:52:05.7
13	Rob Muffels	Germany	1:52:06.3
14	Athanasios Kynigakis	Greece	1:52:06.8
15	Kirill Abrosimov	Russia	1:52:07.9
16	Logan Vanhuys	Belgium	1:52:18.4
17	Péter Gálicz	Hungary	1:52:23.3
18	Matan Roditi	Israel	1:52:34.4
19	Tobias Robinson	Great Britain	1:52:46.6
20	Evgeny Drattsev	Russia	1:53:05.3
21	Ruslan Sadykov	Russia	1:53:05.5
22	Lars Bottelier	Netherlands	1:53:05.7
23	Matěj Kozubek	Czech Republic	1:53:37.9
24	Ido Gal	Israel	1:54:02.8
25	Jan Hercog	Austria	1:54:03.2
26	Martin Straka	Czech Republic	1:54:07.1
27	Evgenij Pop Acev	North Macedonia	1:54:08.9
28	Ihor Chervynskyy	Ukraine	1:54:10.2
29	Vít Ingeduld	Czech Republic	1:55:47.2
30	Arti Krasniqi	Kosovo	1:55:52.4
31	Yonatan Ahdut	Israel	1:56:30.4
32	Tamás Farkas	Serbia	2:00:00.2
	Bogdan Petre	Romania	DNF
	Logan Fontaine	France	DNS
	Tomáš Peciar	Slovakia	DNS
