= 2026 Pan Pacific Swimming Championships – Men's 10 kilometre open water =

Men's 10 kilometre open water at the 2026 Pan Pacific Swimming Championships
- Venue: Long Beach, California
- Dates: 10 August
- Competitors: 25 from 10 nations
- Winning time: 1:49:51

Medalists
gold medal	Florian Wellbrock	Germany
silver medal	Paulo Strehlke	Mexico
bronze medal	Dario Verani	Italy

Official Video

The men's 10 kilometre open water competition of the 2026 Pan Pacific Swimming Championships was held on 10 August at Long Beach, California.

At a meeting of the charter nations of the Pan Pacific Swimming Association on 23 August 2024, it was agreed that the 10 kilometre open water events at the 2026 Pan Pacific Swimming Championships would be open all members of European Aquatics should they wish to attend, with a cap of two entries per event. Four European swimmers contested the events – Wellbrock, Verani and Pasquale Giordano of Italy in the men's event and Germany's Jeanette Spiwoks in the women's.

== Results ==
Final results
Rank	Swimmer	Nation	Time	Notes
1st place, gold medalist(s)	Florian Wellbrock	Germany	1:49:51	
2nd place, silver medalist(s)	Paulo Strehlke	Mexico	1:49:58	
3rd place, bronze medalist(s)	Dario Verani	Italy	1:50:01	
4	Joshua Brown	United States	1:50:05	
5	Ivan Puskovitch	United States	1:50:06	
6	Joey Tepper	United States	1:50:07	
7	Víctor Moreno	Brazil	1:50:08	
8	Dylan Gravley	United States	1:50:09	
9	Nicholas Sloman	Australia	1:50:10	
10	Kaito Tsujimori	Japan	1:50:10	
11	Matheus Melecchi	Brazil	1:50:11	
12	Pasquale Giordano	Italy	1:51:33	
13	Kaito Tabuchi	Japan	1:52:33	
14	Euan Liney	Australia	1:52:36	
15	Riku Ezawa	Japan	1:53:06	
16	Taishin Minamide	Japan	1:54:38	
17	Diego Obele Cisneros	Mexico	1:55:05	
18	Connor Albertyn	South Africa	1:55:28	
19	Henre Louw	South Africa	1:56:18	
20	Roberto Valdés Ochoa	Mexico	1:56:19	
21	Byron Kimber	South Africa	1:56:48	
22	Sven van der Linde	South Africa	1:59:09	
23	Colt Chaires	Canada	2:07:51	
24	Percy Escobar	Bolivia	2:08:40	
	Sebastian Paulins	Canada	DNF	
