= Ohrid Swimming Marathon =

The Ohrid Swimming Marathon (Macedonian: Охридски Пливачки Маратон, Ohridski Plivački Maraton) is an international Open water swimming competition, established in always taking place in the waters of the Ohrid Lake, Republic of North Macedonia. The swimmers are supposed to swim 30 km from Sveti Naum to the Ohrid harbor.

The first marathon race was organized in 1952 and was swum on the relation "Gorica – Ohrid" which is 2,5 km long. Second and third marathons were organized in 1956 and 1957. In 1962 the marathon was held on the relation "Pestani Village – Struga – Ohrid" with length of 36 km. It was then held from 1964 to 1966; in 1963 it was cancelled due to the big earthquake which destroyed Skopje. From 1992 it is organized on the 30 km long swimming path "Klime Savin" which starts at the Monastery of St. Naum and finishes at the city port of Ohrid.

== The 2008 Marathon ==
The 2008 competition was the 22nd edition of the Ohrid Swimming Marathon. Prior to the event the Swimming Federation o of Macedonia announced that in 2008 there will be about 25 competitors, of which six are from the Republic of Macedonia itself and several other swimmers from other countries including Argentina, Bulgaria or Slovenia. The winner of the marathon was Bulgarian swimmer Petar Stoychev.

== Past winners ==
Course record

Date	Winner-Men	Nationality	Time (h:m:s)	Winner-Women	Nationality	Time (h:m:s)
1992	Pavel Ramdisek	Slovakia		Teodora Raptis	North Macedonia	
1993	Zoltan Kade	Hungary		Rita Kovács	Hungary	
1994	Julio Fernandez	Argentina	5:10:04	Natasa Tomanovic	Croatia	5:38:56
1995	Julio Fernandez	Argentina	6:14:00	Natasa Tomanovic	Croatia	6:46:18
1996	David Meca Medina	Spain	5:43:24	Rita Kovács	Hungary	6:14:59
1997	David Meca Medina	Spain	5:31:43	Anne Chagnaud	France	5:53:14
1998	David Meca Medina	Spain	5:57:25	Peggy Büchse	Germany	6:28:04
1999	Aleksey Akatyev	Russia	6:08:28	Peggy Büchse	Germany	6:11:23
2000	Igor Majcen	Slovenia	5:19:49	Edith van Dijk	Netherlands	5:27:39
2001	Petar Stoychev	Bulgaria	6:00:17	Edith van Dijk	Netherlands	6:02:09
2002	Petar Stoychev	Bulgaria	5:56:23	Edith van Dijk	Netherlands	6:06:04
2003	Petar Stoychev	Bulgaria	5:36:19	Angela Maurer	Germany	5:57:43
2004	Petar Stoychev	Bulgaria	5:31:11	Angela Maurer	Germany	5:43:23
2005	Gilles Rondy	France	5:23:58	Edith van Dijk	Netherlands	5:26:06
2006	Petar Stoychev	Bulgaria	5:36:19	Darja Pop	Montenegro	6:52:44
2007	Petar Stoychev	Bulgaria	5:52:00	Esther Nuñez Morera	Spain	6:26:15
2008	Petar Stoychev	Bulgaria	6:14:51	Stefanie Biller	Germany	6:15:58
2009	Petar Stoychev	Bulgaria	5:25:37	Camilla Frediani	Italy	5:50:37
2010	Petar Stoychev	Bulgaria	5:37:39	Karla Šitić	Croatia	5:47:18
2011	Petar Stoychev	Bulgaria	5:35:13	Karla Šitić	Croatia	5:52:55
2012	Petar Stoychev	Bulgaria	5:19:30	Olga Koziul	Russia	5:33:41
2013	Axel Reymond	France	5:09:54	Martina Grimaldi	Italy	5:24:07
2014	Brian Ryckeman	Belgium	5:41:47	Silvie Rybářová	Czech Republic	6:09:34
2015	Evgeniy Pop Atsev	North Macedonia	5:39:42	Alice Franco	Italy	5:44:03
2016	Tomi Stefanovski	North Macedonia	5:55:18	Olga Kozydub	Russia	5:55:25
2017	Alexander Studzinski	Germany	5:15:14	Barbara Pozzobon	Italy	5:15:51
2018	Francesco Ghettini	Italy	5:13:59	Barbara Pozzobon	Italy	5:22:59
