= Beach soccer at the 2019 Mediterranean Beach Games =

Tournament details
- Host country: Greece
- Dates: 28–31 August
- Teams: 8 (from 3 confederations)
- Venue(s): Patras

Final positions
- Champions: Italy (2nd title)
- Runners-up: Portugal
- Third place: France
- Fourth place: Morocco

Tournament statistics
- Matches played: 16
- Goals scored: 185 (11.56 per match)
- Top scorer(s): (Italy) Fabio Sciacca (Italy) Emmanuele Zurlo (9 goals)

The beach soccer tournament at the 2019 Mediterranean Beach Games was held from 28 to 31 August at the South Park, Patras.

== Medalists ==
| Event | Gold | Silver | Bronze |
|---|---|---|---|
| Men | Italy; Alessio Battini; Andrea Carpita; Alfio Luca Chiavaro; Alessio Frainetti; Josep Junior Gentilin; Simone Marinai; Pietro Angelo Palazzolo; Dario Ramacciotti; Fabio Sciacca; Emmanuele Zurlo; Marco Giordani; Marcello Percia Montani | Portugal; Léo Martins; Belchior; Tiago Petrony; Jordan Santos; Bruno Torres; Rui Coimbra; João Gonçalves; Elinton Andrade; Madjer; Rúben Brilhante; Ricardinho; Tiago Batalha | France; Victor Angeletti; Anthony Barbotti; Stéphane Belhomme; Jérémy Bru; Lucas Drouillet; Anthony Fayos; Quentin Gosselin; Maxime Legal; Mathieu Prouvost; German Salazar; Dionizio Santos; Julien Soares |

== Group stage ==
All times are local (UTC+3).

=== Group A ===
| Pos | Team | Pld | W | W+ | WP | L | GF | GA | GD | Pts | Qualification |
|---|---|---|---|---|---|---|---|---|---|---|---|
| 1 | Portugal | 3 | 2 | 0 | 1 | 0 | 18 | 9 | +9 | 7 | Gold medal match |
| 2 | Morocco | 3 | 2 | 0 | 0 | 1 | 18 | 9 | +9 | 6 | Bronze medal match |
| 3 | Greece (H) | 3 | 1 | 0 | 0 | 2 | 13 | 13 | 0 | 3 | Fifth place match |
| 4 | Syria | 3 | 0 | 0 | 0 | 3 | 5 | 23 | −18 | 0 | Seventh place match |

Source: Patras 2019
(H) Host
28 August 2019
17:30

| Portugal | 4–4 (a.e.t.) | Morocco |
|---|---|---|
| | Report |
Penalties
| | 5–4 |

Artemis C2
Referee: Özcan Sultanoğlu (Turkey)
28 August 2019
19:00

| Greece | 6–2 | Syria |
|---|---|---|
| | Report |

Artemis C2
Referee: Moussa Bounaanaa (France)

29 August 2019
19:00

| Syria | 1–9 | Morocco |
|---|---|---|
| | Report |

Artemis CC
Referee: Hassan Abed Rabbo (Lebanon)
29 August 2019
20:30

| Greece | 3–6 | Portugal |
|---|---|---|
| | Report |

Artemis CC
Referee: Murat Ergin Gözütok (Turkey)

30 August 2019
19:00

| Syria | 2–8 | Portugal |
|---|---|---|
| | Report |

Artemis CC
Referee: Murat Ergin Gözütok (Turkey)
30 August 2019
20:30

| Greece | 4–5 | Morocco |
|---|---|---|
| | Report |

Artemis CC
Referee: Özcan Sultanoğlu (Turkey)

=== Group B ===
| Pos | Team | Pld | W | W+ | WP | L | GF | GA | GD | Pts | Qualification |
|---|---|---|---|---|---|---|---|---|---|---|---|
| 1 | Italy | 3 | 3 | 0 | 0 | 0 | 33 | 6 | +27 | 9 | Gold medal match |
| 2 | France | 3 | 2 | 0 | 0 | 1 | 28 | 12 | +16 | 6 | Bronze medal match |
| 3 | Libya | 3 | 1 | 0 | 0 | 2 | 21 | 21 | 0 | 3 | Fifth place match |
| 4 | Albania | 3 | 0 | 0 | 0 | 3 | 4 | 47 | −43 | 0 | Seventh place match |

Source: Patras 2019
28 August 2019
14:30

| France | 19–1 | Albania |
|---|---|---|
| | Report |

Artemis C2
Referee: Francisco de Oses (Spain)
28 August 2019
16:00

| Italy | 12–3 | Libya |
|---|---|---|
| | Report |

Artemis C2
Referee: Antonio Pereira Almeida (Portugal)

29 August 2019
16:00

| Libya | 13–3 | Albania |
|---|---|---|
| | Report |

Artemis CC
Referee: Murat Ergin Gözütok (Turkey)
29 August 2019
17:30

| Italy | 6–3 | France |
|---|---|---|
| | Report |

Artemis CC
Referee: Antonio Pereira Almeida (Portugal)

30 August 2019
16:00

| Libya | 5–6 | France |
|---|---|---|
| | Report |

Artemis CC
Referee: Francisco de Oses (Spain)
30 August 2019
17:30

| Italy | 15–0 | Albania |
|---|---|---|
| | Report |

Artemis CC
Referee: Antonio Pereira Almeida (Portugal)

== Final round ==
=== Seventh place match ===
31 August 2019
10:15

| Syria | 10–4 | Albania |
|---|---|---|
| | Report |

Artemis C2
Referee: Jonathan Mallia (Malta)

=== Fifth place match ===
31 August 2019
10:15

| Greece | 8–5 | Libya |
|---|---|---|
| | Report |

Artemis CC
Referee: Moussa Bounaanaa (France)

=== Bronze medal match ===
31 August 2019
11:45

| Morocco | 1–5 | France |
|---|---|---|
| | Report |

Artemis CC
Referee: Antonio Pereira Almeida (Portugal)

=== Gold medal match ===
31 August 2019
13:15

| Portugal | 5–7 | Italy |
|---|---|---|
| | Report |

Artemis CC
Referee: Özcan Sultanoğlu (Turkey)

== Final standings ==
| Rank | Team |
|---|---|
| 1st place, gold medalist(s) | Italy |
| 2nd place, silver medalist(s) | Portugal |
| 3rd place, bronze medalist(s) | France |
| 4 | Morocco |
| 5 | Greece |
| 6 | Libya |
| 7 | Syria |
| 8 | Albania |
