= Open water swimming at the 2022 European Aquatics Championships – Men's 25 km =

Men's 25 km at the 2022 European Aquatics Championships
- Venue: Ostia
- Dates: 20 August

Medalists
gold medal	Mario Sanzullo	Italy
silver medal	Dario Verani	Italy
bronze medal	Matteo Furlan	Italy

The Men's 25 km competition of the 2022 European Aquatics Championships were held on 20 August.

Swimmers were halted partway through the competition due to extreme weather and the event canceled. Approximately three months later, LEN awarded the medals and final rankings.

== Results ==
The race was started at 13:00.

Rank	Swimmer	Nationality	Time
1st place, gold medalist(s)	Mario Sanzullo	Italy	
2nd place, silver medalist(s)	Dario Verani	Italy	
3rd place, bronze medalist(s)	Matteo Furlan	Italy	
4	Axel Reymond	France	
5	Marcel Schouten	Netherlands	
6	Matěj Kozubek	Czech Republic	
7	Lars Bottelier	Netherlands	
8	Zalán Sárkány	Hungary	
9	Andreas Waschburger	Germany	
10	Ben Langner	Germany	
11	Martin Straka	Czech Republic	
12	Matthieu Magne	France	
13	Alexandre Verplaetse	France	
DNF	Péter Gálicz	Hungary	
