= Open water swimming at the 2014 European Aquatics Championships – Men's 25 km =

Men's 25 km at the Open water swimming at the 2014 European Aquatics Championships
- Dates: 17 August
- Competitors: 18 from 11 nations
- Winning time: 4:59:18.8

Medalists
gold medal	Axel Reymond	France
silver medal	Evgeny Drattsev	Russia
bronze medal	Edoardo Stochino	Italy

The Men's 25 km competition of the 2014 European Aquatics Championships was held on 17 August.

== Results ==
The race was started at 09:00.

Rank	Swimmer	Nationality	Time
1st place, gold medalist(s)	Axel Reymond	France	4:59:18.8
2nd place, silver medalist(s)	Evgeny Drattsev	Russia	4:59:31.2
3rd place, bronze medalist(s)	Edoardo Stochino	Italy	5:08:51.0
4	Andreas Waschburger	Germany	5:08:52.6
5	Mario Sanzullo	Italy	5:09:02.8
6	Alexander Studzinski	Germany	5:09:42.6
7	Yuval Safra	Israel	5:10:09.6
8	Marcel Schouten	Netherlands	5:10:48.4
9	Christopher Bryan	Ireland	5:12:40.1
10	Valerio Cleri	Italy	5:12:53.5
11	Shahar Resman	Israel	5:14:14.7
12	Jan Pošmourný	Czech Republic	5:22:36.2
13	Vit Ingeduld	Czech Republic	5:24:57.3
14	Georgios Arniakos	Greece	5:25:45.9
—	Marin Milan	Croatia	DNF
—	Karel Baloun	Czech Republic	DNF
—	Daniel Székelyi	Hungary	DNF
—	Christian Reichert	Germany	DSQ
