= 2019 World Series (disambiguation) =

The 2019 World Series was the championship series of Major League Baseball's 2019 season.

2019 World Series may also refer to:

== Baseball ==
- 2019 Little League World Series
- 2019 Intermediate League World Series
- 2019 Junior League World Series
- 2019 Senior League World Series
- 2019 College World Series

== Other ==
- 2019 Red Bull Cliff Diving World Series
- 2019 World Series of Darts
- 2019 FINA Diving World Series
- 2019 World Series of Poker
- 2019 World Series of Poker Europe
- 2019 FINA Marathon Swim World Series
- 2019–20 America's Cup World Series
