= Open water swimming at the 2024 European Aquatics Championships – Men's 25 km =

Men's 25 km at the 2024 European Aquatics Championships
- Venue: Ada Ciganlija
- Dates: 14 June
- Competitors: 8 from 5 nations
- Winning time: 5:08:50.9

Medalists
gold medal	Dario Verani	Italy
silver medal	Matteo Furlan	Italy
bronze medal	Axel Reymond	France

The Men's 25 km competition at the 2024 European Aquatics Championships was held on 14 June.

== Results ==
The race was started at 09:00.

Rank	Swimmer	Nationality	Time
1st place, gold medalist(s)	Dario Verani	Italy	5:08:50.9
2nd place, silver medalist(s)	Matteo Furlan	Italy	5:08:56.6
3rd place, bronze medalist(s)	Axel Reymond	France	5:09:00.5
4	Péter Gálicz	Hungary	5:09:13.4
5	Moritz Bockes	Germany	5:09:59.3
6	Yael Balz	Germany	5:13:24.2
7	Matěj Kozubek	Czech Republic	5:25:25.5
	Mario Sanzullo	Italy	DNF
