= Beach soccer at the 2015 Mediterranean Beach Games =

Tournament details
- Host country: Italy
- Dates: 2–6 September
- Teams: 12 (from 3 confederations)
- Venue: 1

Final positions
- Champions: Italy
- Runners-up: Egypt
- Third place: Libya
- Fourth place: Morocco

Tournament statistics
- Matches played: 30
- Goals scored: 195 (6.5 per match)

Beach soccer at the 2015 Mediterranean Beach Games in Pescara took place from 2 to 6 September 2015 at the Arena del Mare. One event took place, the men's tournament.

The event was organised in cooperation with Beach Soccer Worldwide (BSWW).

Hosts Italy won the gold medal.

== Medalists ==
Event	Gold	Silver	Bronze
Men	Italy; Francesco Corosiniti; Simone Del Mestre; Michele Di Palma; Gabriele Gori; Simone Marinai; Matteo Marrucci; Raffaele Ortolini; Pietro Palazzolo; Paolo Palmacci; Dario Ramacciotti; Stefano Spada; Emanuele Zurlo	Egypt; Moustafa Abdelmoneim; Ahmed Ahmed; Mohamed Attia; Aly Elbarbary; Ahmed Fayed; Mohamed Hassan; Hassane Hussein; Mohamed Issa; Eslam Salama; Moustafa Shaaban; Eslam Taha	Libya; Abdulkader Aledresi; Abdulmohaimen Almaddukh; Adel Alshareef; Abdulrouf Bdiri; Sand Masaud; Munir Masoud; Abdissalam Msallem; Hany Mushata; Tariq Qutayt; Emadeddin Shawesh; Esam Shrif

== Participating teams ==
Twelve teams took part in the first edition of beach soccer at the Mediterranean Beach Games.

The draw to split the twelve teams into three groups of four took place on 18 July.

- Albania
- Algeria
- Egypt
- France
- Greece
- Italy
- Lebanon
- Malta
- Morocco
- Libya
- Tunisia
- Turkey

== Group stage ==
Key

Advanced to the knockout stage (group winners and best runners-up)
Placement matches

All times are local, CEST (UTC+2).

=== Group A ===
Pos	Team	Pld	W	W+	WP	L	GF	GA	GD	Pts
1	Italy	3	3	0	0	0	32	8	+24	9
2	Lebanon	3	2	0	0	1	14	11	+3	6
3	Tunisia	3	1	0	0	2	10	15	–5	3
4	Algeria	3	0	0	0	3	11	33	–8	0

2 September 2015, at 11:30; Arena del Mare #2, Pescara	Lebanon	10–4	Algeria	Report
2 September 2015, at 15:15; Arena del Mare #2, Pescara	Tunisia	1–11	Italy	Report
3 September 2015, at 17:30; Arena del Mare #1, Pescara	Lebanon	3–2	Tunisia	Report
3 September 2015, at 21:15; Arena del Mare #1, Pescara	Italy	16–6	Algeria	Report
4 September 2015, at 17:30; Arena del Mare #1, Pescara	Algeria	1–7	Tunisia	Report
4 September 2015, at 21:15; Arena del Mare #1, Pescara	Italy	5–1	Lebanon	Report

=== Group B ===
Pos	Team	Pld	W	W+	WP	L	GF	GA	GD	Pts
1	Egypt^{1}	3	3	0	0	0	18	6	+12	7
2	Morocco	3	2	0	0	1	12	8	+4	6
3	Turkey	3	1	0	0	2	18	6	+12	3
4	Malta	3	0	0	0	3	4	32	–28	0

1. Egypt were found to have breached BSWW regulations in their match against Turkey, and were therefore deducted 2 points

2 September 2015, at 10:15; Arena del Mare #2, Pescara	Egypt	3–2	Turkey	Report
2 September 2015, at 14:00; Arena del Mare #2, Pescara	Malta	2–7	Morocco	Report
3 September 2015, at 16:15; Arena del Mare #1, Pescara	Egypt	11–2	Malta	Report
3 September 2015, at 20:00; Arena del Mare #1, Pescara	Morocco	3–2	Turkey	Report
4 September 2015, at 16:15; Arena del Mare #1, Pescara	Turkey	14–0	Malta	Report
4 September 2015, at 20:00; Arena del Mare #1, Pescara	Morocco	2–4	Egypt	Report

=== Group C ===
Pos	Team	Pld	W	W+	WP	L	GF	GA	GD	Pts
1	Libya	3	2	0	0	1	19	6	+13	6
2	France	3	1	0	1	1	10	7	+3	4
3	Albania	3	1	0	0	2	12	25	–13	3
4	Greece	3	0	1	0	2	9	12	–3	2

2 September 2015, at 9:00; Arena del Mare #2, Pescara	Greece	1–3	Libya	Report
2 September 2015, at 12:45; Arena del Mare #2, Pescara	Albania	2–6	France	Report
3 September 2015, at 15:00; Arena del Mare #1, Pescara	Greece	5–7	Albania	Report
3 September 2015, at 18:45; Arena del Mare #1, Pescara	France	2–2 (a.e.t.); 2–0 (p)	Libya	Report
4 September 2015, at 15:00; Arena del Mare #1, Pescara	Libya	14–3	Albania	Report
4 September 2015, at 18:45; Arena del Mare #1, Pescara	France	2–3 (a.e.t.)	Greece	Report

== Placement matches ==
=== 9th–12th place play-offs ===
All fourth placed teams plus the worst ranked third place team contested 9th through 12th place.

Semifinals
Albania	5
Malta	2
Algeria	1
Greece	9

9th place match
Albania	3 (1)
Greece (p)	3 (3)
11th place match
Malta	7
Algeria	6

==== Semi-finals ====
5 September 2015, at 14:30; Arena del Mare #1, Pescara	Albania	5–2	Malta	Report
5 September 2015, at 15:45; Arena del Mare #1, Pescara	Greece	9–1	Algeria	Report

==== 11th place match ====
6 September 2015, at 10:00; Arena del Mare #1, Pescara	Malta	7–6	Algeria	Report

==== 9th place match ====
6 September 2015, at 11:15; Arena del Mare #1, Pescara	Albania	3–3 (a.e.t.); 1–3 (p)	Greece	Report

=== 5th–8th place play-offs ===
Worst and second best runners-up plus the best and second best third place teams contested 5th through 8th place.

Semifinals
Lebanon (a.e.t.)	5
Tunisia	4
Turkey	2
France	5

5th place match
Lebanon	2
France	3
7th place match
Tunisia	3
Turkey	4

==== Semi-finals ====
5 September 2015, at 19:45; Arena del Mare #1, Pescara	Lebanon	5–4 (a.e.t.)	Tunisia	Report
5 September 2015, at 21:00; Arena del Mare #1, Pescara	France	5–2	Turkey	Report

==== 7th place match ====
6 September 2015, at 12:30; Arena del Mare #1, Pescara	Tunisia	3–4	Turkey	Report

==== 5th place match ====
6 September 2015, at 13:45; Arena del Mare #1, Pescara	Lebanon	2–3	France	Report

== Knockout stage ==
Semifinals
Egypt	6
Libya	5
Morocco	0
Italy	5

Gold medal match
Egypt	1
Italy	5
Bronze medal match
Libya	4
Morocco	3

=== Semi-finals ===
5 September 2015, at 17:15; Arena del Mare #1, Pescara	Egypt	6–5	Libya	Report
5 September 2015, at 18:30; Arena del Mare #1, Pescara	Italy	5–0	Morocco	Report

=== Bronze medal match ===
6 September 2015, at 15:00; Arena del Mare #1, Pescara	Libya	4–3	Morocco	Report

=== Final – Gold medal match ===
6 September 2015, at 16:50; Arena del Mare #1, Pescara	Egypt	1–5	Italy	Report

Mediterranean Beach Games
beach soccer gold medallists

Italy
First title

== Final standings ==
Pos	Team
1st place, gold medalist(s)	Italy
2nd place, silver medalist(s)	Egypt
3rd place, bronze medalist(s)	Libya
4	Morocco
5	France
6	Lebanon
7	Turkey
8	Tunisia
9	Greece
10	Albania
11	Malta
12	Algeria
