= Tomi Stefanovski =

Macedonian long distance swimmer

Personal information
- Born: January 1, 1971 (age 55)

Sport
- Sport: Swimming

Tomi Stefanovski is a Macedonian long distance swimmer. He competed on the FINA Open Water Circuit between 1997 and 2016. He has been inducted into the International Marathon Swimming Hall of Fame.

== Career ==
Early in his career Stafanovski played water polo. After retiring from this sport he began competing in long distance open water swimming. He competed in his first FINA Open Water Swimming Grand Prix race in 1997.

In 2009 Stefanovski swam across the English channel.

In 2013 Stefanovski won the race across Lac St Jean.

In 2014 Stefanovski participated in both long and short distance swims, and in both cold and warm waters. He won the Lac St Jean marathon (32 km) in Canada, came third in the Parana marathon (88 km) in Argentina, and also completed the Santa Fe (56 km) and Rosario (20 km) marathons in Argentina, the Capri-Napoli marathon (36 km) in Italy, the Ohrid marathon (30 km) in Macedonia, the Magog marathon in Canada, and the Cancun marathon (15 km) in Mexico. His Grand Prix Final Ranking that year was second place.

In 2015 Stefanovski swam in third place in the Ohrid Marathon; in 2016 he won that race. After placing third in the Lac St. Jean race and seventh in Italy, he was tied for first place in the 2016 FINA Open Water Swimming Grand Prix circuit with Edoardo Stochino of Italy
