= Open water swimming at the 2020 European Aquatics Championships – Men's 25 km =

Men's 25 km at the 2020 European Aquatics Championships
- Venue: Lupa Lake
- Dates: 16 May 2021
- Competitors: 15 from 8 nations
- Winning time: 4:35:59.8

Medalists
gold medal	Axel Reymond	France
silver medal	Matteo Furlan	Italy
bronze medal	Kirill Abrosimov	Russia

The Men's 25 km competition of the 2020 European Aquatics Championships was held on 16 May 2021.

== Results ==
The race was held at 9:30.

Rank	Swimmer	Nationality	Time
1st place, gold medalist(s)	Axel Reymond	France	4:35:59.8
2nd place, silver medalist(s)	Matteo Furlan	Italy	4:36:05.1
3rd place, bronze medalist(s)	Kirill Abrosimov	Russia	4:36:06.2
4	Alessio Occhipinti	Italy	4:36:12.0
5	Lars Bottelier	Netherlands	4:36:17.9
6	Simone Ruffini	Italy	4:36:18.1
7	Ruslan Sadykov	Russia	4:37:13.4
8	Péter Gálicz	Hungary	4:37:32.7
9	Evgenij Pop Acev	North Macedonia	4:37:34.0
10	Dávid Huszti	Hungary	4:38:37.0
11	Martin Straka	Czech Republic	4:39:56.0
12	Matěj Kozubek	Czech Republic	4:40:44.9
13	Niklas Frach	Germany	4:46:43.6
—	Evgeny Drattsev	Russia	Did not finish
—	Jules Wallart	France	Did not finish
