= 2015 Mediterranean Beach Games =

I Mediterranean Beach Games
- Nations: 24
- Athletes: 900
- Events: 58 in 11 sports
- Opening: 28 August 2015
- Closing: 6 September 2015
- Opened by: Massimo Cassano; Undersecretary at the Ministry of Social Policies
- Ceremony venue: Marina of Pescara
- Website: pescara2015.it

The 2015 Mediterranean Beach Games was the first edition of the Mediterranean Beach Games. It was held from 28 August to 6 September 2015 in Pescara, Italy.

== Sports ==
- Aquathlon (2)
- Beach handball (2)
- Beach soccer (1)
- Beach tennis (3)
- Beach volleyball (2)
- Beach wrestling (7)
- Canoe ocean racing (2)
- Finswimming (18+5) (Pool+Open Water)
- Open water swimming (3)
- Rowing beach sprint (7)
- Water skiing (6)

== Participating nations ==
All 24 member nations of the International Committee for the Mediterranean Games competed in this edition of Mediterranean Beach Games.

- Albania (8)
- Algeria (21)
- Andorra (1)
- Bosnia and Herzegovina (9)
- Croatia (61)
- Cyprus (31)
- Egypt (111)
- France (121)
- Greece (87)
- Italy (199) (host country)
- Lebanon (21)
- Libya (17)
- North Macedonia (10)
- Malta (20)
- Monaco (42)
- Montenegro (33)
- Morocco (29)
- San Marino (10)
- Serbia (122)
- Slovenia (128)
- Spain (181)
- Syria (9)
- Tunisia (81)
- Turkey (162)

== Medal table ==
Final medal standings are shown below, information from official website of 2015 Mediterranean Beach Games for 58 events while one bronze sharing in beach wrestling.

* Host nation (Italy)

Rank	Nation	Gold	Silver	Bronze	Total
1	Italy*	33	23	14	70
2	France	13	5	9	27
3	Greece	5	7	9	21
4	Algeria	2	4	4	10
5	Egypt	1	6	4	11
6	Tunisia	1	4	7	12
7	Turkey	1	2	2	5
8	Serbia	1	1	0	2
9	Syria	1	0	0	1
10	Spain	0	4	1	5
11	Slovenia	0	1	3	4
12	Cyprus	0	1	0	1
13	Croatia	0	0	2	2
13	San Marino	0	0	2	2
15	Albania	0	0	1	1
15	Libya	0	0	1	1
Totals (16 entries)		58	58	59	175

== Results ==
https://web.archive.org/web/20190824190922/https://www.mbgpatras2019.gr/pescara2015

=== Aquathlon ===
Event	Gold	Silver	Bronze
Men	Gianluca Pozzati; Italy	Riccardo De Palma; Italy	Dylan Magnien; France
Women	Sara Papais; Italy	Anna Godoy Contreras; Spain	Elisa Marcon; Italy

=== Beach handball ===
Event	Gold	Silver	Bronze
Men	Tunisia; Mohamed Khalil Ben Mida; Achraf Elabed; Hassine Hamza Lakhdar; Mohamed Maaouia; Omar Saied; Ahmed Sfar; Marouane Soussi; Aimen Touzi	Cyprus; Christos Argyrou; Julios Argyrou; Theodotos Christou; Christos Hadjiefrem; Xenios Kyprianou; Andreas Miltos Markides; Yiannos Nikiforou; Kyriacos Sophocleous; Georgios Stylianou; Themistoklis Tsivikos	Turkey; Çetin Çelik; Ozan Erdoğan; Musa Günerler; Cemal Kütahya; Ramazan Mutlu; Müjdat Özcan; Gökhan Şanlı; Yakup Yasar Simsar; Ekrem Tüfekçidere; Burak Turan
Women	Italy; Angela Cappellaro; Eleonora Costa; Irene Fanton; Cristina Gheorghe; Valentina Landri; Francesca Luchin; Anika Niederwieser; Monika Prünster; Laura Celeste Rotondo; Gaia Maria Zuin	Greece; Ntafina Dimitri; Sofia Dimitriou; Anna Polyxeni Kaloidi; Elisavet Mastaka; Eleni Mournou; Anastasia Papavasileiou; Eleni Poimenidou; Niki Ratsika; Vasiliki Skara; Athina Vasileiadou	Turkey; Esma Adnar; Neslihan Çalışkan; Merve Durdu; Serpil İskenderoğlu; Sibel Karameke; Reyhan Kaya; Buket Keskin; İrem Köseler; Fetane Uzunlar; Yeliz Yılmaz

=== Beach tennis ===
Event	Gold	Silver	Bronze
Men's doubles	Italy; Teo Casadei; Gian Maria Pazzaglia	Italy; Diego Bollettinari; Dennis Valmori	San Marino; Nicoló Bombini; Alvise Galli
Women's doubles	Italy; Veronica Casadei; Greta Giusti	Italy; Nicole Nobile; Ninny Jannika Valentini	San Marino; Alice Grandi; Camilla Zafferani
Mixed doubles	Italy; Nicole Nobile; Diego Bollettinari	Italy; Veronica Casadei; Teo Casadei	Slovenia; Marcela Cuderman; Urban Cevka

=== Beach volleyball ===
Event	Gold	Silver	Bronze
Men	Turkey; Murat Giginoğlu; Volkan Gogtepe	Italy; Marco Caminati; Enrico Rossi	Croatia; Filip Silić; Ivan Zeljković
Women	Serbia; Milena Matić; Marija Milošević	Italy; Laura Giombini; Giulia Toti	France; Melinda Adelin; Zoé Cazalet

=== Beach wrestling ===
Event	Gold	Silver	Bronze
Men's 70 kg	Apostolos Taskoudis; Greece	Mehdi Ait Amrane; Algeria	Christos Navrozidis; Greece
Men's 80 kg	Billel Hadri; Algeria	Vincenzo Chiara; Italy	Georgios Koulouchidis; Greece
Men's 80 kg	Billel Hadri; Algeria	Vincenzo Chiara; Italy	Osman Hajdari; Albania
Men's 90 kg	Salvatore Purpura; Italy	Timofei Xenidis; Greece	Aly Moustafa; Egypt
Men's +90 kg	Raja Alkrad; Syria	Micheil Tsikovani; Greece	Juan Francisco Espino; Spain
Women's 60 kg	Emilie Dufour; France	Rabia Lamalsa; Algeria	Amina Benabderrahmane; Algeria
Women's 70 kg	Agoro Papavasileiou; Greece	Aurora Fajardo; Spain	Mariana Kolic; France
Women's +70 kg	Samar Amer; Egypt	Aikaterini Eirini Pitsiava; Greece	Tassadit Amer; Algeria

=== Canoe ocean racing ===
Event	Gold	Silver	Bronze
Men's 10 km	Maximilian Benassi; Italy	Esteban Medina; Spain	Mattia Colombi; Italy
Women's 10 km	Stefania Cicali; Italy	Anna Alberti; Italy	Abir Ben Ismaïl; Tunisia

=== Finswimming ===
Men

Event	Gold	Silver	Bronze
50 m apnea	Alexandre Noir; France	Cesare Fumarola; Italy	Loukas Karetzopoulos; Greece
50 m bi-fins	Andrea Pegoraro; Italy	Michele Russo; Italy	Mohamed Elmozayen; Egypt
100 m bi-fins	Andrea Pegoraro; Italy	Mohamed Elmozayen; Egypt	Michele Russo; Italy
200 m bi-fins	Andrea Pegoraro; Italy	Mohamed Elmozayen; Egypt	Mohamed Benyahia Nedjar; Algeria
100 m surface	Alexandre Noir; France	Cesare Fumarola; Italy	Loukas Karetzopoulos; Greece
200 m surface	Christos Christoforidis; Greece	Davide De Ceglie; Italy	Stefano Figini; Italy
400 m surface	Christos Christoforidis; Greece	Stefano Figini; Italy	Davide De Ceglie; Italy
4 × 50 m bi-fins	Italy; Davide De Ceglie; Giona Cristofari; Michele Russo; Andrea Pegoraro	Turkey; Berker Çakar; Can Şerifoğlu; Hamit Taha Tayfur; Ozcan Esen	France; Nicola Crisante; Hugo Pellet; Stanys Caron; Alexandre Noir
4 × 100 m surface	Italy; Giona Cristofari; Stefano Figini; Davide De Ceglie; Cesare Fumarola	Spain; Jesus Caravaca; Javier Lopez; David Asin; José Antonio Perez	France; Alexandre Noir; Stanys Caron; Nicola Crisante; Hugo Pellet
Open water 2 km bi-fins	Mohamed Benyahia Nedjar; Algeria	Malek Zagrani; Tunisia	Mohamed Saadani; Tunisia
Open water 4 km surface	Davide De Ceglie; Italy	Andrej Matic; Serbia	Moustafa Nail; Egypt

Women

Event	Gold	Silver	Bronze
50 m apnea	Sofia Ktena; Greece	Camille Heitz; France	Erica Barbon; Italy
50 m bi-fins	Elisa Mammi; Italy	Silvia Baroncini; Italy	Khouloud Saadani; Tunisia
100 m bi-fins	Giorgia Di Credico; Italy	Isabella Brambilla; Italy	Khouloud Saadani; Tunisia
200 m bi-fins	Giorgia Di Credico; Italy	Isabella Brambilla; Italy	Najla Mansour; Tunisia
100 m surface	Camille Heitz; France	Sofia Ktena; Greece	Erica Barbon; Italy
200 m surface	Camille Heitz; France	Erica Barbon; Italy	Alexandra Nisioti; Greece
400 m surface	Erica Barbon; Italy	Alexandra Nisioti; Greece	Serena Monduzzi; Italy
4 × 50 m bi-fins	Italy; Elisa Mammi; Silvia Baroncini; Giorgia Di Credico; Erica Barbon	France; Colette Gelas; Pauline Rivens; Camille Heitz; Nolwenn Patrie	Tunisia; Najla Mansour; Amira Trabelsi; Meriem Ben Haj; Khouloud Saadani
4 × 100 m surface	Italy; Erica Barbon; Isabella Brambilla; Giorgia Di Credico; Silvia Baroncini	Turkey; Zühre İşici; Zeynep Ak; Ecem Tekin; Beste Tuğçem Akgün	France; Oceane Hubaut; Nolwenn Patrie; Loren Baron; Camille Heitz
Open water 2 km bi-fins	Elisa Mammi; Italy	Najla Mansour; Tunisia	Isabella Brambilla; Italy
Open water 4 km surface	Serena Monduzzi; Italy	Yassmin Amin; Egypt	Alaa Mohamed; Egypt

Mixed

Event	Gold	Silver	Bronze
Open water 4 × 2 km	Italy; Stefano Figini; Silvia Baroncini; Serena Monduzzi; Davide De Ceglie	Egypt; Abanob Meshrky; Alaa Mohamed; Yassmin Amin; Moustafa Nail	France; Antoine Fauveau; Pauline Rivens; Julien Guilbaut; Loren Baron

=== Open water swimming ===
Event	Gold	Silver	Bronze
Men's 5 km	Dario Verani; Italy	Andrea Manzi; Italy	Georgios Arniakos; Greece
Women's 5 km	Arianna Bridi; Italy	Giulia Gabbrielleschi; Italy	Špela Perše; Slovenia
Mixed 5 km team	Italy; Andrea Bianchi; Arianna Bridi; Dario Verani	Italy; Giulia Gabbrielleschi; Andrea Manzi; Barbara Pozzobon	Croatia; Matija Luka Rafaj; Ivan Šitić; Karla Šitić

=== Rowing beach sprint ===
Event	Gold	Silver	Bronze
Men's C1X	Simone Ranieri; Italy	Mohamed Ben Sidhom; Tunisia	Matej Grobelnik; Slovenia
Men's C2X	France; Benoit Bride; Julien Gazaix	Slovenia; Gasper Ostanek; Vid Pugelj	Italy; Tiziano Evangelisti; Dino Pari
Men's C4X+1	France; Vincent Alligier; Benjamin Bajard; Guillaume Bec; Olivier Duffet; Remi Rouviere	Algeria; Kamel Ait Daoud; Mohamed Abderraouf Djouimai; Chaouki Dries; Mohamed Ryad Garidi; Adlane Larbi	Italy; Simone Ferrarese; Stefano Gioia; Jacopo Mancini; Simone Martini; Nicolò Pagani
Women's C1X	Carmela Pappalardo; Italy	Jessica Berra; France	Nawel Chiali; Algeria
Women's C2X	Italy; Veronica Paccagnella; Benedetta Bellio	Algeria; Nawel Chiali; Narimane Harzallah	Tunisia; Malek Ounis; Ibtissem Trimèche
Women's C4X+1	France; Justine Billet; Anne Jouy; Charlène Malaboeuf; Agathe Pichon; Marie Tavernier	Greece; Paraskevi Giannou; Panagiota Gkeka; Dimitra Kouklotidou; Styliani Koumpli; Maria Pergouli	Italy; Ludovica Lucidi; Fabiana Romito; Elena Waiglein; Serena Cicerchia; Ludovica Serafini
Relay	France; Benoit Bride; Julien Gazaix; Jessica Berra; Lionel Picard; Justine Billet; Charlène Malaboeuf	Tunisia; Abdallah Adouani; Skander Cherni; Sarra Boulares; Mohamed Ben Sidhom; Malek Ounis; Ibtissem Trimèche	Italy; Tiziano Evangelisti; Dino Pari; Carmela Pappalardo; Simone Ranieri; Benedetta Bellio; Veronica Paccagnella

=== Water ski ===
Event	Gold	Silver	Bronze
Men's slalom	Thibaut Daillant; France	Davide Napolitano; Italy	Lorenzo D'Alberto; Italy
Men's trick	Thibaut Daillant; France	Pierre Ballon; France	Nikolas Plytas; Greece
Women's slalom	Clementine Lucine; France	Beatrice Ianni; Italy	Claire Lise Welter; France
Women's trick	Clementine Lucine; France	Marialuisa Pajni; Italy	Natalia Paschou; Greece
Men's wakeboard	Nicolò Caimi; Italy	Yann Calvez; France	Lucas Langlois; France
Women's wakeboard	Giorgia Gregorio; Italy	Sina Luxor; Egypt	Marie Vympranietsova; Greece
