= 2018 Pan Pacific Swimming Championships – Men's 10 kilometre open water =

Men's 10 kilometre open water at the 2018 Pan Pacific Swimming Championships
- Venue: Hojyo Beach
- Dates: 14 August
- Competitors: 14 from 7 nations
- Winning time: 1:58:50.5

Medalists
gold medal	Jordan Wilimovsky	United States
silver medal	Eric Hedlin	Canada
bronze medal	Nicholas Sloman	Australia

The men's 10 kilometre open water competition of the 2018 Pan Pacific Swimming Championships was held on 14 August at the Hojyo Beach.

== Results ==
The race was started at 07:00.

Unlimited number of swimmers are permitted per country, but only the top two swimmers from each country was classified.

Rank	Name	Nationality	Time
1st place, gold medalist(s)	Jordan Wilimovsky	United States	1:58:50.5
2nd place, silver medalist(s)	Eric Hedlin	Canada	1:58:56.7
3rd place, bronze medalist(s)	Nicholas Sloman	Australia	1:59:20.8
4	Esteban Enderica	Ecuador	1:59:22.7
5	Allan do Carmo	Brazil	1:59:23.8
6	David Heron	United States	1:59:25.2
7	Hau-Li Fan	Canada	1:59:26.5
8	Victor Colonese	Brazil	1:59:27.2
–	Taylor Abbott	United States	1:59:42.6
9	Taiki Nonaka	Japan	2:00:16.9
10	Takeshi Toyoda	Japan	2:01:37.9
–	James Brinegar	United States	2:02:11.2
11	Matthew Scott	New Zealand	2:02:23.1
–	Zane Grothe	United States	2:03:52.4
