= Sibel Karameke =

Turkish handball player (born 1995)

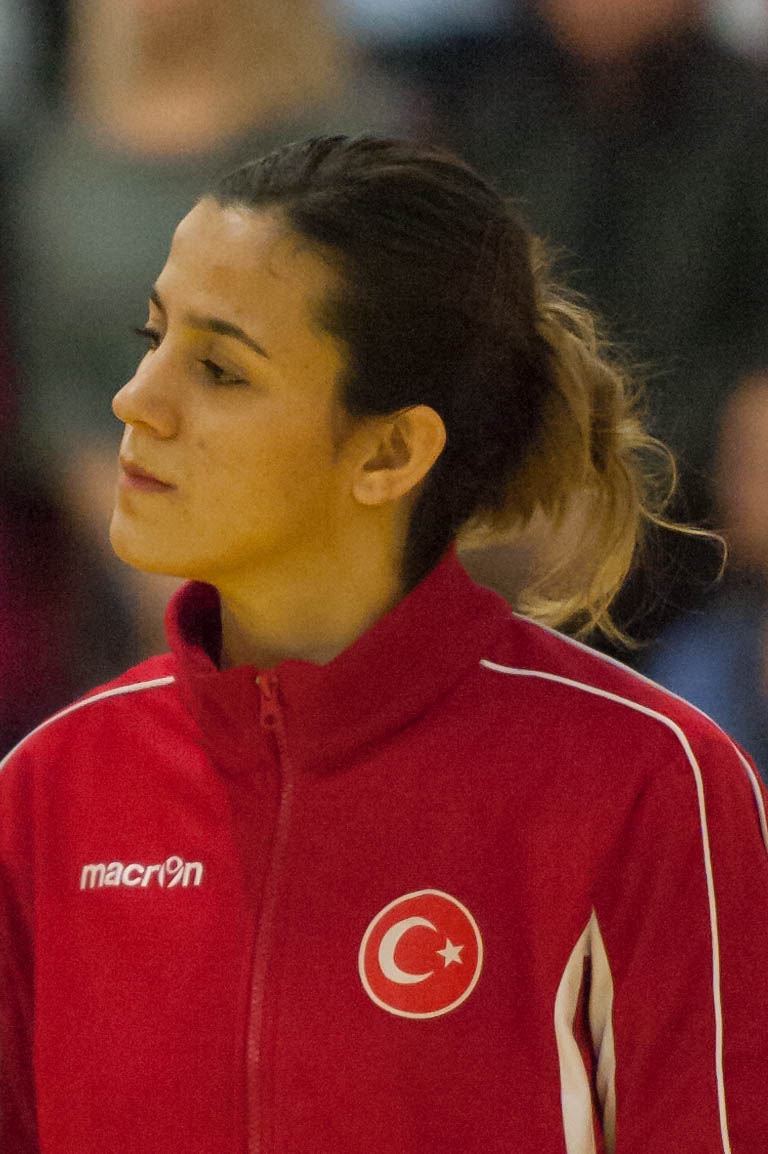
- Sibel Karameke at the 2015 World Women's Handball Championship Qualification.

Personal information
- Born: 7 February 1995 (age 31) Turgutlu, Manisa Province, Turkey

Sport
- Sport: Handball
- Position: Left back
- Current club: İzmir BSB
National team
- Years: Team
- –: Turkey U-19
- –: Turkey
- –: Turkey U-19 beach
- –: Turkey beach

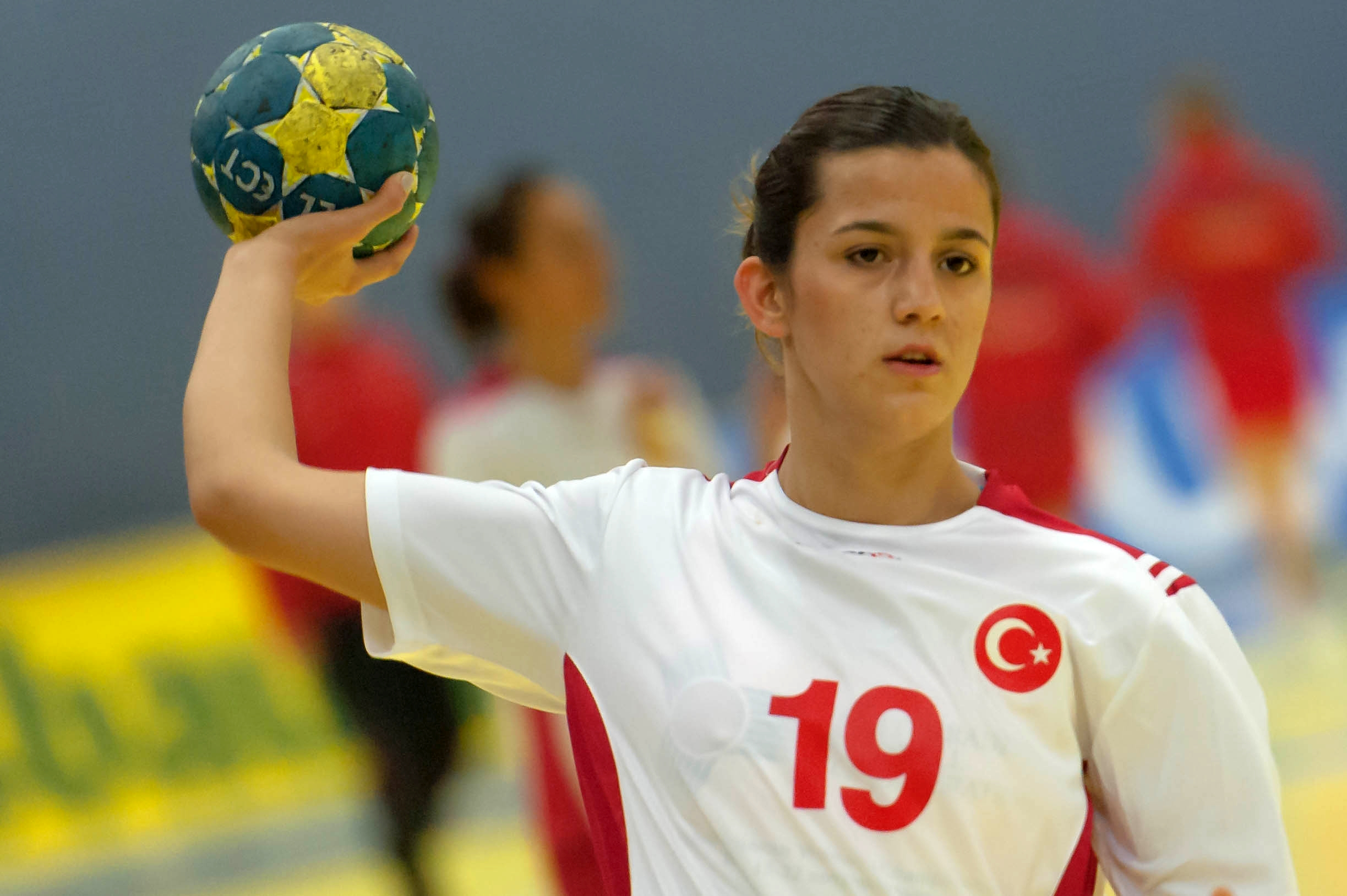
Sibel karameke of Turkey national team at the warm-up for the 2015 World Women's Handball Championship Qualification.

Sibel Karameke (born 7 February 1995) is a Turkish handballer, who plays in the Turkish Women's Handball Super League for İzmir BSB, the Turkey national handball team, and the Turkey national beach handball team. She plays in the left back position.

== Club career ==
Karameke played for İzmir Büyükşehir Belediyesi GSK. By December 2014, she was awarded the "Young Star" title by the peridical "Magazin". She was part of the team at the 2015–16 Women's EHF Challenge Cup.

== International career ==
=== Handball ===
Karameke was part of the Turkey women's national under-19 handball team at the 2013 Women's Under-19 European Handball Championship Qualification. She played for the Turkey women's national handball team at the qualification round of the 2016 European Women's Handball Championship qualification - Group 6 matches. She took part at the qualification round of the 2017 World Women's Handball Championship. She participated at the Group 6 of the 2018 European Women's Handball Championship qualification in France, and the 2018 Mediterranean Games held in Tarragona, Spain with the Turkey national team. At the Group 6 matches of the 2020 European Women's Handball Championship qualification, she captained the national team.

=== Beach handball ===
She played for the Turkey women's national under-19 beach handball team at the 2013 YAC European Beach Handball Championships. She scored 17 goals in the match against Russia, and enjoyed her team's bronze medal title.

She played at the 2015 Mediterranean Beach Games in Pescara, Italy for the Turkey women's national beach handball team, which became bronze medalist.
