= Christos Navrozidis =

Greek freestyle wrestler

- Native name: Χρήστος Ναβροζίδης
- Other names: El Greco
- Nationality: Greek
- Height: 170 cm (5 ft 7 in)
- Weight: 76 kg (168 lb; 12 st 0 lb)
- Style: Freestyle wrestling
- Team: A.O. Efpyridai Ano Liosion, Getto Fight Club

Christos Navrozidis (Greek: Χρήστος Ναβροζίδης, born 1993), known as El Greco, is a Greek freestyle wrestler and bare-knuckle fighter. He has competed in competitions of freestyle wrestling, beach wrestling, bare-knuckle MMA and organized fights by "King of the Streets" (K.O.T.S.).

== Background ==
Navrozidis was born into a Pontic Greek family that fled from Pontus to Georgia during the Greek Genocide. Then from the Kazakh SSR of the Soviet Union they repatriated to Greece. He has always had a very close connection to his family, growing up in Acharnes, north of the Athens urban area.

== Combat sports career ==
At age six, Navrozidis started practicing taekwondo before quickly transitioning to freestyle wrestling. He has won multiple tournaments in Greece in freestyle wrestling and also reached third place in beach wrestling at the 2015 Mediterranean Beach Games.

Navrozidis gained popularity in the European fight scene after making his debut for "King of the Streets" in March 2022 under the name El Greco against professional MMA-fighter Brian Hooi. Despite losing the fight via ground strikes, he impressed with a rarely seen Judo throw and the fact that he travelled over 2000 km by himself without any coaches. The video has over 3 million views on YouTube.

In October 2022 he took on Miłosz Wąsik at the first K.O.T.S. event inside a hockey arena. Navrozidis won the fight by TKO after dominating with his takedowns and ground punches.

In July 2023 he faced Mamuka Gvanidze in a bare-knuckle MMA fight in Athens, Greece, winning by guillotine choke in the first round.

After a year he returned to K.O.T.S. with a win over Polish fighter "Venom" by submission to a standing guillotine choke. During the fight, Navrozidis delivered an overhead slam onto the concrete ground to his opponent.

Navrozidis was scheduled to fight Turkish kickboxer Firat Yokuş in a bare-knuckle fight on February 8, 2025 at Gladiator's Night II. However, due to unprofessional behavior from the Turkish team, the bout was cancelled and Georgian fighter Goga Gogashvili stepped in as a replacement. In the fight, Navrozidis quickly brought his opponent to the ground and secured the victory by technical knockout with punches.

== Bare-knuckle fighting record ==
Res.	Record	Opponent	Method	Event	Date	Round	Time	Location	Notes
Win	5–1	(Spain) Adrian Cerezo	TKO (ground punches)	King of the Streets: Nosebleed	June 29, 2025		8:20		
Win	4–1	(Georgia (country)) Goga Gogashvili	TKO (ground punches)	Gladiator's Night II	February 8, 2025		1:19		
Win	3–1	(Poland) Franciszek "Venom"	Submission (guillotine choke)	King of the Streets: Pursued	October 30, 2023		2:52		
Win	2–1	(Georgia (country)) Mamuka Gvanidze	Submission (guillotine choke)	Ring of War 1	July 9, 2023		1:12		
Win	1–1	(Poland) Miłosz "Wąsu" Wąsik	TKO (ground punches)	King of the Streets: Hockey Fights	October 30, 2022		4:55		
Loss	0–1	(Curaçao) Brian Hooi	TKO (ground punches)	King of the Streets: Blood Money	March 4, 2022		1:51		

== Personal life ==
Navrozidis has a daughter and works as a transportation driver. He enjoys driving long distances for work because of the tranquility. From age 15 he has been a supporter of football club AEK Athens.

Navrozidis is a devout Orthodox Christian, describing the New Testament as a message of love.

His main inspiration for starting with wrestling was his grandfather, who had been a regional champion twice in the Soviet Union.

The nickname El Greco in King of the Streets is based on the Greek painter, sculptor and architect of the Spanish Renaissance, Doménikos Theotokópoulos.
