= Albania national beach soccer team =

National sports team

Albania
- Nickname(s): Kuq e Zinjtë (The Red and Blacks); Shqiponjat (The Eagles)
- Association: Federata Shqiptare e Futbollit
- Confederation: UEFA (Europe)
- Head coach: Ergys Kadiu
- Captain: Blendi Gockaj
- FIFA code: ALB
- BSWW ranking: NR (2 June 2025)
First colours
Second colours

First international
- Albania 3–3 Kosovo (Velipojë, Albania; 1 June 2012) unofficial

Biggest win
- Albania 5–2 Malta (Pescara, Italy; 5 September 2015)

Biggest defeat
- Libya 14–3 Albania (Pescara, Italy; 4 September 2015)

The Albania national beach soccer team represents Albania in international beach soccer competitions and is controlled by the Shoqata Sportive Minifutbolli Shqiptar] (Albanian MiniFootball Association), The Albania national team made their debut in a friendly match in 2012 against an unofficial Kosovan team whom, at the time, were not yet sanctioned by FIFA to take part in official international matches. A rarity in beach soccer, but more commonly found in friendlies, the match was ended as a draw. Albania followed this up with their competitive debut in 2015 at the Mediterranean Beach Games. The squad contains many of the same players who also play for the Albania national futsal team.

== Current squad ==
As of September 2015

Note: Flags indicate national team as defined under FIFA eligibility rules; some limited exceptions apply. Players may hold more than one non-FIFA nationality.

No.	Pos.	Nation	Player
1	GK	ALB	Klodian Rrapi
3	FW	ALB	Enea Kadiu
4	DF	ALB	Arjan Bllumbi (captain)
5	DF	ALB	Marvin Turtulli
6	MF	ALB	Rigest Karaj
7	FW	ALB	Elion Spahiu

No.	Pos.	Nation	Player
8	DF	ALB	Erion Hoxha
9	FW	ALB	Endrit Kaca
10	DF	ALB	Olsi Bajollari
11	MF	ALB	Admir Mehja
12	GK	ALB	Klajdi Metani
14	FW	ALB	Blendi Gockaj

Coach: Ergys Kadiu
Delegation: Klodian Kadiu, Engert Bakalli,

Team Manager: Nderim Kaceli

== Achievements ==
- Mediterranean Beach Games Best: 9th place
  - 2015

== Competitive record ==
=== Mediterranean Beach Games ===
Year	Result	Pld	W	W+	L	GF	GA	GD
Italy 2015	9th place	5	2	1	2	20	30	–10
Total	1/1	5	2	1	2	20	30	–10

== Sources ==
- Squad
- Results
