= Vasiliki Skara =

Greek handball player (born 1973)

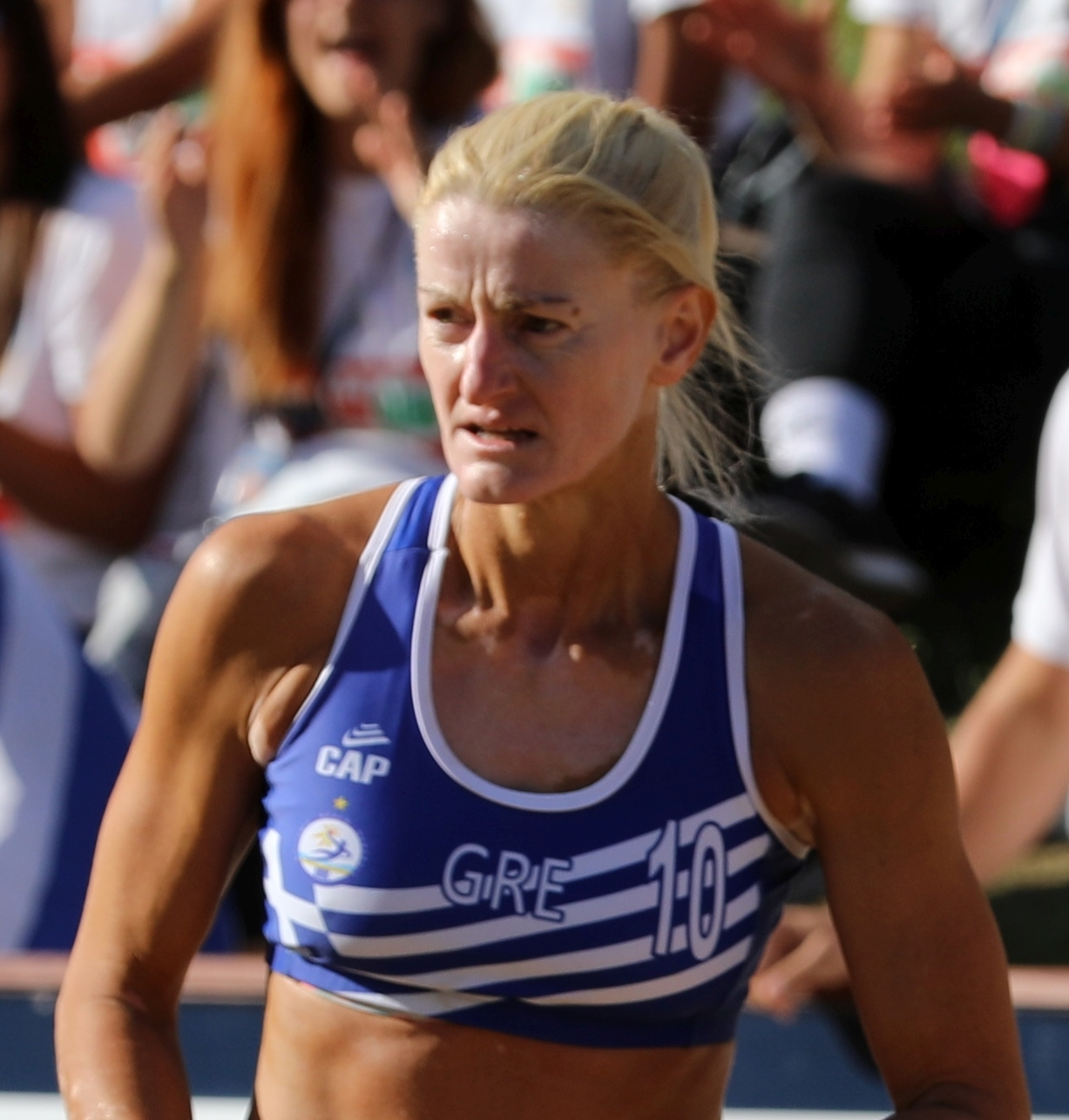
Skara at the European Beach handball Championships 2019

Vasiliki Skara (born 4 May 1973) is a Greek handball player who competed in the 2004 Summer Olympics.
