= Nicholas Sloman =

Australian swimmer (born 1997)

Personal information
- Nationality: Australian
- Born: 30 October 1997 (age 28) Queensland, Australia

Sport
- Country: Australia
- Sport: Open water swimming
- Event(s): 5 km, 10 km, open water team relay
- Club: Noosa
Medal record
Men's open water swimming
Representing Australia
Event	1st	2nd	3rd
World Championships	1	0	1
Pan Pacific Championships	0	0	1
Total	1	0	2
World Championships
Gold medal – first place	2024 Doha	Team open water
Bronze medal – third place	2023 Fukuoka	Team open water
Pan Pacific Championships
Bronze medal – third place	2018 Tokyo	10 km open water

Nicholas Sloman (born 30 October 1997) is an Australian open water swimmer. He is a six-time medalist at FINA Marathon Swim World Series, winning a gold medal and a silver medal at the 2019 edition and three silver medals and one bronze medal at the 2022 edition. At the 2018 Pan Pacific Championships, he won the bronze medal in the 10 kilometre open water swim.

== Career ==
=== 2018–2019 ===
For the 2018 Pan Pacific Swimming Championships, held in August in Tokyo, Japan, Sloman was named to the Swimming Australia roster. He competed in the 10 kilometre open water swim on 14 August, where he won the bronze medal with a time of 1:59:20.8, which was 30.3 seconds behind gold medalist Jordan Wilimovsky of the United States and 24.1 seconds behind silver medalist Eric Hedlin of Canada.

At the 2019 Surf Life Saving Australia Championships in March in Burleigh Heads, Sloman won the national title in the 2 kilometre ocean swim along with Lani Pallister, who won the women's title, marking his third-consecutive title in the event. He followed up with a silver medal in the 10 kilometre open water swim at the leg of the 2019 FINA Marathon Swim World Series held in May in Seychelles with a time of 1:56:04.10. Two months later, at the 2019 World Aquatics Championships held in July in Gwangju, South Korea, he placed twenty-first in the 10 kilometre open water swim on 16 July, finishing in a time of 1:49:22.7. Two days later, he placed fifth in the 5 kilometre (4×1250 metre) open water team relay with a final relay time of 54:36.8. In September, at the leg of the Marathon Swim World Series Nantou, Taiwan, he won the gold medal in the 10 kilometre open water swim with a time of 1:56:31.20.

=== 2022 ===
==== 2022 World Aquatics Championships ====
In March, Sloman was one of six swimmers named to Team Australia in open water swimming for the 2022 World Aquatics Championships in Budapest, Hungary. On 26 June, he helped achieve a sixth-place finish in the mixed gender 4×1500 metre open water relay with a time of 1:05:30.8. In his second event, the 5 kilometre open water swim the next day, he tied Brennan Gravley of the United States for tenth-place with a time of 54:28.4. For his third and final event, the 10 kilometre open water swim held on 29 June, he finished in a time of 1:51:58.1 and placed eighth, which was 1 minute and 1.3 seconds behind gold medalist Gregorio Paltrinieri of Italy.

==== 2022 Marathon Swim World Series ====
At the second leg of the 2022 FINA Marathon Swim World Series, held in July at Parc de la Villette in Paris, France, Sloman won a silver medal in the 4×1500 metre open water relay in a time of 1:08:03.75. He also finished in a time of 1:51:41.95 in the 10 kilometre swim and won the bronze medal. The following leg, conducted in August at Lake Mégantic in Canada, he won the silver medal in the 10 kilometre open water swim with a time of 1:50:51.68, sharing the podium with gold medalist Domenico Acerenza of Italy and bronze medalist Dávid Betlehem of Hungary. He won a second silver medal in the 4×1500 metre open water relay at the final leg, with competition held in November in Eilat, Israel, helping achieve a final time of 1:06:36.60. For the 10 kilometre swim he placed eleventh with a time of 1:46:56.60. Across all of the legs of the World Circuit for the year, he earned 1600 points, tying for rank of sixth overall with Dario Verani of Italy amongst all male competitors.

=== 2023 ===
In January 2023, at the year's Australian Open Water Championships, Sloman finished in a time of 55:20.96 in the 5 kilometre open water swim to place second less than one-tenth of a second behind Kyle Lee. Two months later, he was named to the 2023 World Aquatics Championships roster for Swimming Australia in the 10 kilometre open water swim. In April, at the 2023 Australian Swimming Championships in Gold Coast, Queensland, he won the bronze medal in the 1500 metre freestyle with a 15:18.20 and placed ninth in the 400 metre freestyle with a 3:55.98.

== International championships ==
Meet	5 kilometre	10 kilometre	open water team relay
PAC 2018 (age: 20)	—N/a	(bronze) (1:59:20.8)	—N/a
WC 2019 (age: 21)		21st (1:49:22.7)	5th (4×1250 m – 54:36.8)
WC 2022 (age: 24)	10th (54:28.4)	8th (1:51:58.1)	6th (4 × 1500 m – 1:05:30.8)

== Marathon Swim World Series circuits ==
The following medals Sloman has won at Marathon Swim World Series circuits.

Edition	Individual			Relay			Total
Edition	Gold	Silver	Bronze	Gold	Silver	Bronze	Total
2019	1	1	0	–	–	–	2
2022	0	1	1	0	2	0	4
Total	1	2	1	0	2	0	6
