= Eric Hedlin =

Canadian long-distance swimmer

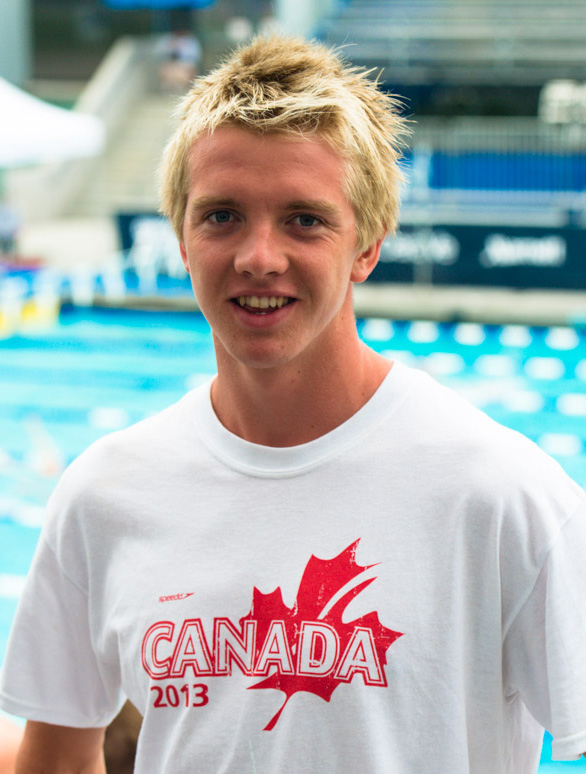
- Hedlin in Irvine, California, at the US Open in August 2013

Personal information
- Born: April 18, 1993 (age 33) Calgary, Alberta, Canada
- Height: 6 ft 1 in (185 cm)
- Weight: 178 lb (81 kg)

Sport
- Sport: Swimming
- Strokes: Freestyle
- Club: Victoria Academy of Swimming
Medal record
World Championships
Silver medal – second place	2013 Barcelona	5 km open water
Bronze medal – third place	2019 Gwangju	5 km open water
Pan Pacific Championships
Silver medal – second place	2018 Tokyo	10 km open water
Universiade
Bronze medal – third place	2013 Kazan	800 m freestyle

Eric Hedlin (born April 18, 1993) is a Canadian long-distance swimmer. Hedlin won a silver medal in the men's open water 5 km swim at the 2013 World Aquatics Championships.

== Career ==
Hedlin began his notable international career competing in Randy Bennett's Victoria Swim Academy that also includes major Canadian World and Olympic medallist Ryan Cochrane who is also a long distance swimmer. As a member of the Canadian swim team he won a bronze medal at the 2013 Summer Universiade in the men's 800 m freestyle.

Hedlin qualified for the 2013 World Aquatics Championships by finishing 16th at the FINA World Cup event in Cancun Mexico in April of that year. This put him into the 5 km race where he was in a dogfight with former World Champion Thomas Lurz and Olympic champion Oussama Mellouli. Hedlin said of the race that " "I am really happy, because I didn't expect [to beat Lurz]. It felt pretty good. I was trying to hold a top position and stay in everyone's draft. In the final sprint, Oussama was so much quicker than me, and I couldn't do anything to beat him." Hedlin was honoured with Swimming Canada's 2013 People's Choice Race of the Year award for his performance in this race.

He continued to swim for the University of Victoria (UVic) Vikes Varsity Swim Team through 2017, winning gold at the U SPORTS championships, and setting a new collegiate record in the 1500-metre freestyle. In April that same year, Hedlin was named to Canada's 2017 World Aquatics Championships team in Budapest, Hungary. He also was selected to represent Canada at the 2017 FISU Universiade in Taipei.

At the 2018 Pan Pacific Championships, Eric Hedlin captured silver in the 10-km open water race, and also finished eighth in the 1500-m freestyle. Hedlin later won gold in the 10-km race at the 2018 UANA Open Water Swimming Championships in the Cayman Islands, and won Swimming Canada’s Male Open Water Swimmer of the Year.

In 2019, Hedlin won bronze in 5-km at the FINA world aquatics championships in Gwangju, South Korea, and won Athlete of the Year at UVic.

Prior to the outbreak of the COVID-19 pandemic in 2020, Hedlin was awarded the President's Cup from UVic, for his combination of academic and athletic success that season. He continued to train through the pandemic, despite Olympic Trials being postponed until the following year.

In 2021, Hedlin was named as one of 4 athletes to compete on behalf of Canada at Olympic Trials for the 10-km open water race. Unfortunately, Hedlin was unable to finish the race due to medical issues and did not qualify for the team.

== Personal life ==
Although Hedlin was born in Calgary, Alberta, Canada, he lived in San Diego, California from the age of a few months until he graduated from La Jolla High School. At that time he returned to Canada to train in swimming and to attend the University of Victoria. His older sister, Dr. Margot Hedlin, is a physician training at NYU Medicine, and his younger brother, Paul Hedlin, graduated from the University of British Columbia in 2020 with a degree in International Economics.

In the spring of 2019, Hedlin graduated from UVic with a bachelor's degree in computer science. Later that year in June, he proposed to his long-time girlfriend and fellow Vikes teammate, Taylor Snowden-Richardson. After their original wedding date in 2020 had to be postponed due to COVID-19, they married in April 2021.

Hedlin successfully defended his master's thesis in September 2021, and will be continuing his education by studying for a Ph.D.
