= Kirill Abrosimov =

Russian swimmer (born 1991)

Personal information
- Native name: Кирилл Владимирович Абросимов
- Born: 22 November 1991 (age 34) Soviet Union

Sport
- Country: Russia
- Sport: Swimming
Medal record
European Championships
Gold medal – first place	2012 Piombino	10 km open water
Gold medal – first place	2012 Piombino	5 km open water
Gold medal – first place	2016 Hoorn	5 km open water
Bronze medal – third place	2020 Budapest	25 km open water
Summer Universiade
Silver medal – second place	2011 Shenzhen	10 km open water

Kirill Vladimirovich Abrosimov (Russian: Кирилл Владимирович Абросимов; born 22 November 1991) is a Russian swimmer. He won the men's 5 km event at the European Open Water Championships in 2012 and in 2016. He also won the men's 10 km event in 2012.

In 2011, he won the silver medal in the men's 10 km event at the 2011 Summer Universiade held in Shenzhen, China.

In 2016, he won the men's 5 km event at the 2016 European Open Water Championships held in Hoorn, Netherlands.

In 2021, he won the bronze medal in the men's 25 km event at the 2020 European Aquatics Championships held in Budapest, Hungary. He also competed in the men's 5 km, men's 10 km and team events. Subsequently, he competed in the men's 10 km event at the 2020 Summer Olympics.
