= Xin Xin =

Chinese swimmer (born 1996)

Personal information
- Nationality: China
- Born: 6 November 1996 (age 29) Jinan, Shandong, China
- Height: 1.76 m (5 ft 9 in)
- Weight: 58 kg (128 lb)

Sport
- Sport: Swimming
- Strokes: Freestyle
Medal record
World Championships
Gold medal – first place	2019 Gwangju	10 km open water

Xin Xin (Chinese: 辛鑫; pinyin: Xīn Xīn; born 6 November 1996) is a Chinese swimmer. She competed for China at the 2012, 2016, 2020 and 2024 Summer Olympics. In all except 2012 she competed in the 10km open water marathon event. In 2012 she raced in the 800m freestyle, coming 24th.

At the 2016 Olympics in Rio de Janeiro, she achieved her best finish of 4th in the 10 km marathon.

== See also ==
- China at the 2012 Summer Olympics – Swimming
- China at the 2016 Summer Olympics – Swimming
- China at the 2020 Summer Olympics – Swimming
- China at the 2024 Summer Olympics – Swimming
