= Edoardo Stochino =

Italian swimmer (born 1987)

Personal information
- Born: 5 November 1987 (age 38) Chiavari, Italy
- Height: 1.84 m (6 ft 0 in)
- Weight: 70 kg (150 lb)

Sport
- Sport: Swimming
- Club: Fiamme Oro
Medal record
Representing Italy
European championships
Bronze medal – third place	2014 Berlin	25 km
Bronze medal – third place	2016 Hoorn	25 km open water

Edoardo Stochino (born 5 November 1987) is an Italian marathon swimmer who won a bronze medal in the 25 km race at the 2014 European Aquatics Championships.
