= Matteo Furlan =

Italian swimmer (born 1989)

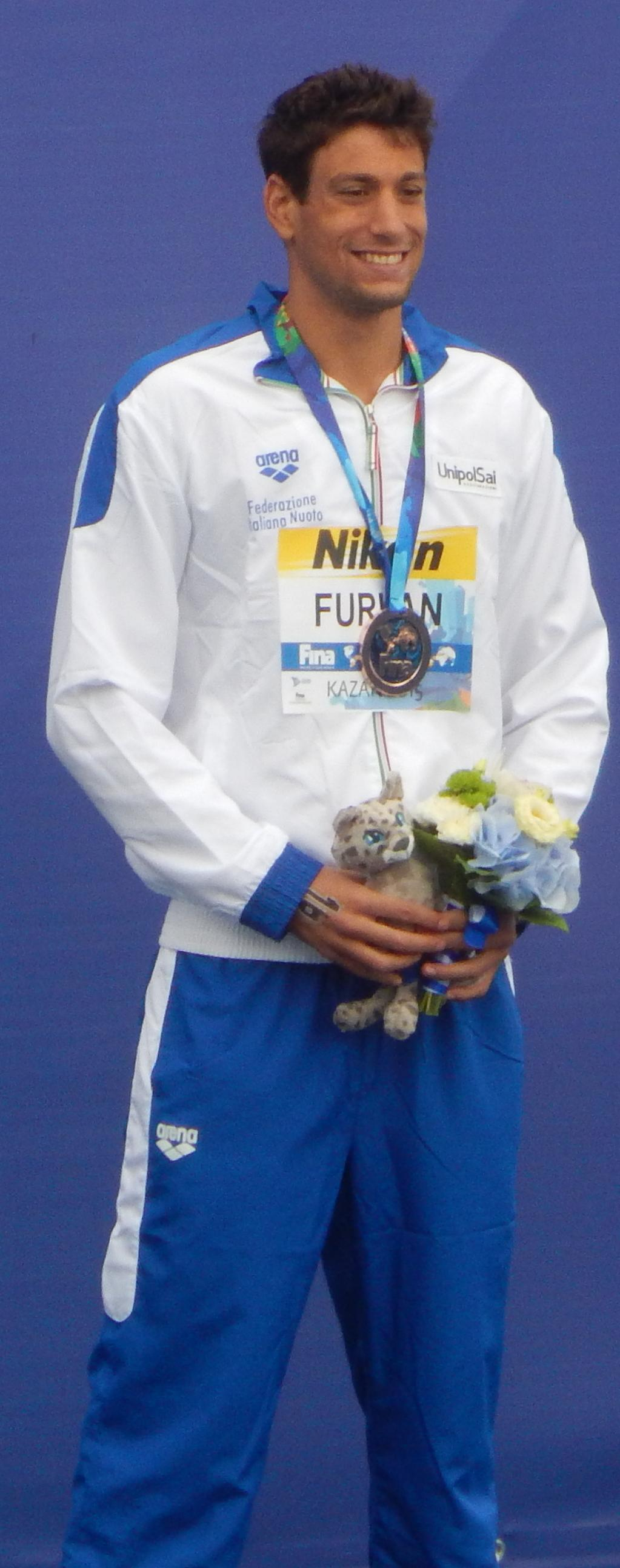

Personal information
- National team: Italy
- Born: 29 May 1989 (age 37)
- Height: 194 cm (6 ft 4 in)
- Weight: 80 kg (176 lb)

Sport
- Sport: Swimming
- Strokes: Open water swimming
- Club: G.S. Marina Militare
Medal record
Men's swimming
Representing Italy
World Championships
Silver medal – second place	2017 Budapest	25 km open water
Bronze medal – third place	2015 Kazan	25 km open water
Bronze medal – third place	2015 Kazan	5 km marathon
European Championships
Silver medal – second place	2016 Hoorn	25 km open water
Silver medal – second place	2020 Budapest	25 km open water
Silver medal – second place	2024 Belgrade	25 km open water
Bronze medal – third place	2018 Glasgow	25 km open water
Bronze medal – third place	2022 Rome	25 km open water
Universiade
Gold medal – first place	2013 Kazan	10 km open water
Silver medal – second place	2015 Gwangju	10 km open water
Mediterranean Games
Bronze medal – third place	2013 Mersin	1500 m freestyle

Matteo Furlan (born 29 May 1989) is an Italian swimmer.

Furlan is an athlete of the Gruppo Sportivo della Marina Militare.

He competed in the 25 km open water event at the 2018 European Aquatics Championships, winning the bronze medal.
