= Axel Reymond =

French swimmer (born 1994)

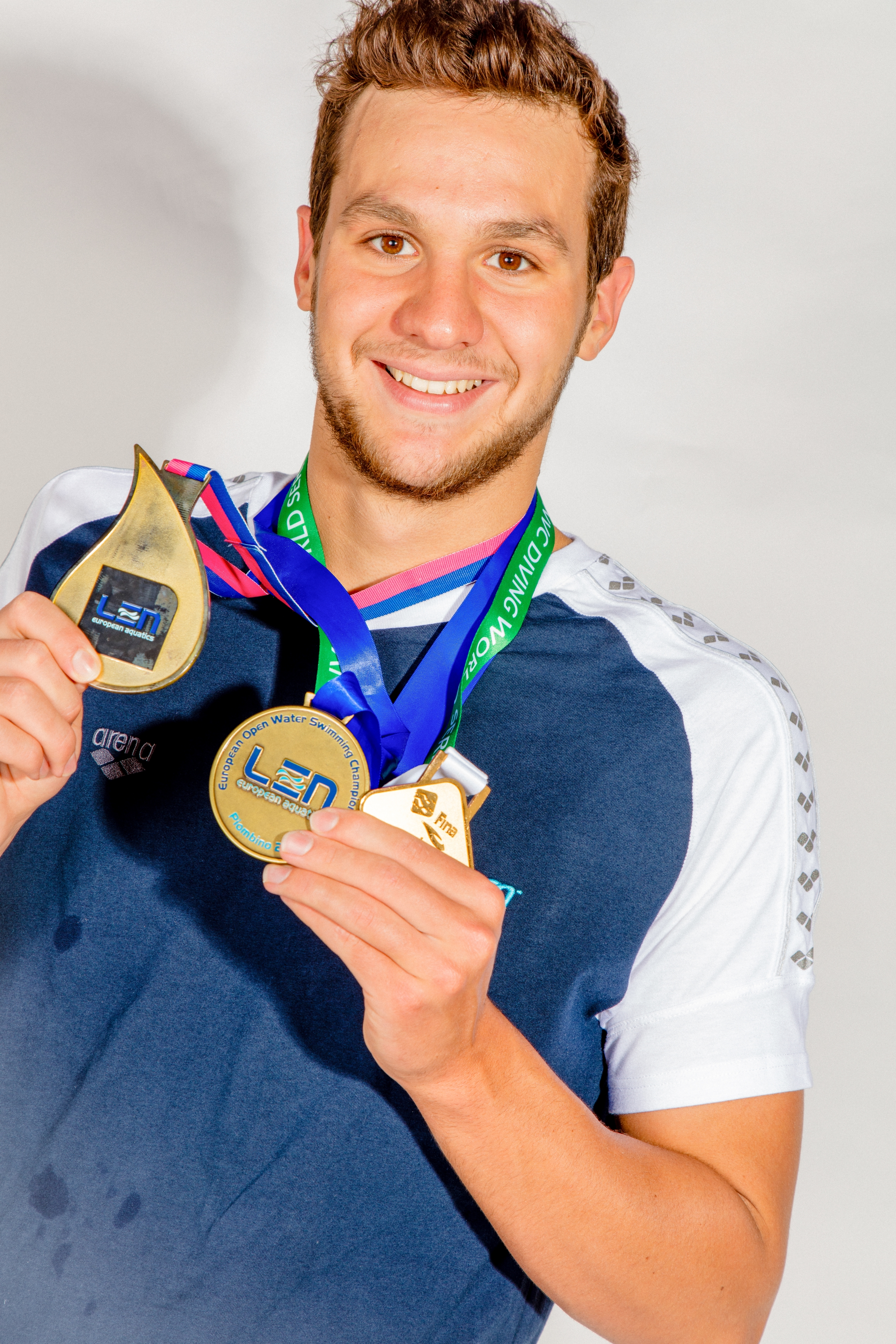
- Reymond during Open Doors of CNFA, 10 January 2016

Personal information
- Nationality: French
- Born: 13 February 1994 (age 32) Paris, France
- Height: 1.91 m (6 ft 3 in)
- Weight: 82 kg (181 lb)

Sport
- Sport: Swimming
- Strokes: Freestyle, open water
- Club: A.A.S. Sarcelles Natation 95
- Coach: Magali Mérino
Medal record
Men's swimming
Representing France
Event	1st	2nd	3rd
World Championships	2	1	0
European Championships	3	1	3
Total	5	2	3
World Championships
Gold medal – first place	2017 Budapest	25 km open water
Gold medal – first place	2019 Gwangju	25 km open water
Silver medal – second place	2022 Budapest	25 km open water
European Championships
Gold medal – first place	2014 Berlin	25 km open water
Gold medal – first place	2016 Hoorn	25 km open water
Gold medal – first place	2020 Budapest	25 km open water
Silver medal – second place	2018 Glasgow	5 km open water
Bronze medal – third place	2012 Piombino	25 km open water
Bronze medal – third place	2022 Rome	Team relay
Bronze medal – third place	2024 Belgrade	25 km open water

Axel Reymond (born 13 February 1994) is a French Marathon swimmer in open water swimming events (5 km (3.1 mi), 10 km (6.2 mi) and 25 km (16 mi)). Lives near Fontainebleau (Seine-et-Marne), he was training at AS Plessis-Savigny Natation by Magali Mérino. In May 2014, he joined her at the Cercle des Nageurs of Fontainebleau-Avon, where he remains committed to his training while becoming licensed in CSM Clamart Natation in 2016. After several victories in Open Water Swimming French Cup since 2009 on different distances, after several Champion titles of France on 25 km (16 mi), after a bronze medal during the 2012 Open Water Swimming European Championships at Piombino (in Italy), he landed, 17 August 2014, the gold medal of the 25 km (16 mi) during the 2014 European Swimming Championships in Berlin. He is a member of the France Swimming A Team since 2012. 15 November 2015, he beats the hour record of France by browsing 5859.25m during the 2015 National Autumn Meeting National at Compiègne (in France). 14 July 2016, the French National Day, he again won the 25 km from the European Championships at Hoorn (Netherlands). In Budapest (World Championships in 2017), on 21 July 2017, Axel won the 25 km of the World Championships in 2017 and became the first French Men's World Champion in that distance. In August 2017, he joined the club of A.A.S. Sarcelles Natation 95.

== Career ==
Axel Reymond, who resided in Nandy, began swimming at age 6 in "Association Sportive Le Plessis Savigny" (ASPS) in the pool of Savigny-le-Temple where he will be driven by Magali Mérino who is always his current coach. He discovered Open Water in 2008 with a first title of Vice-Champion of France on 10 km (6.2 mi).

In 2009, Axel Reymond becomes number 1 French Under 16 years old, winning six stages of the Open Water French Cup. The year after, he will be both number 1 French Cadets and All Categories, with 9 victories in the Cup of France, as well as bronze medal in the Open Water Championships in France. Also in 2010, he will participate in an international event outside France for the first time at Oeiras in Portugal, finishing 8th in All Categories, of this "COnfederación MEditerránea de Natación Cup"'s stage (COMEN).

In 2011, during a step of COMEN in Limassol (Cyprus), he won his first international medal, it will be in bronze.

Will follow in 2012, his integration into the France Swimming A Team, his first participation in the World Championships in Welland (Canada, where he will end 7th 7.5 km (4.7 mi)) and his first participation of European Championships at Piombino (Italy) where he obtained his first European Medal in Bronze. This same year, he will be Champion of France on 25 km (16 mi), as he was then kept it in 2013, 2014 and 2015.

Then in 2013, in Ohrid (Macedonia), he won his first medal of the Open Water Marathon World Cup, on 30 km (19 mi). And at Canet-en-Roussillon, he won the Open Water Championship of France on 10 km (6.2 mi), in addition to the 25 km (16 mi).

In May 2014, Axel Reymond joined Magali Mérino his coach at Swimmers's Circle of Fontainebleau-Avon.

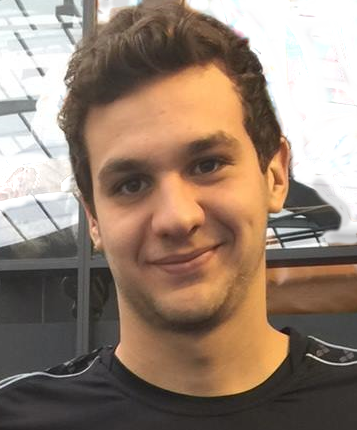

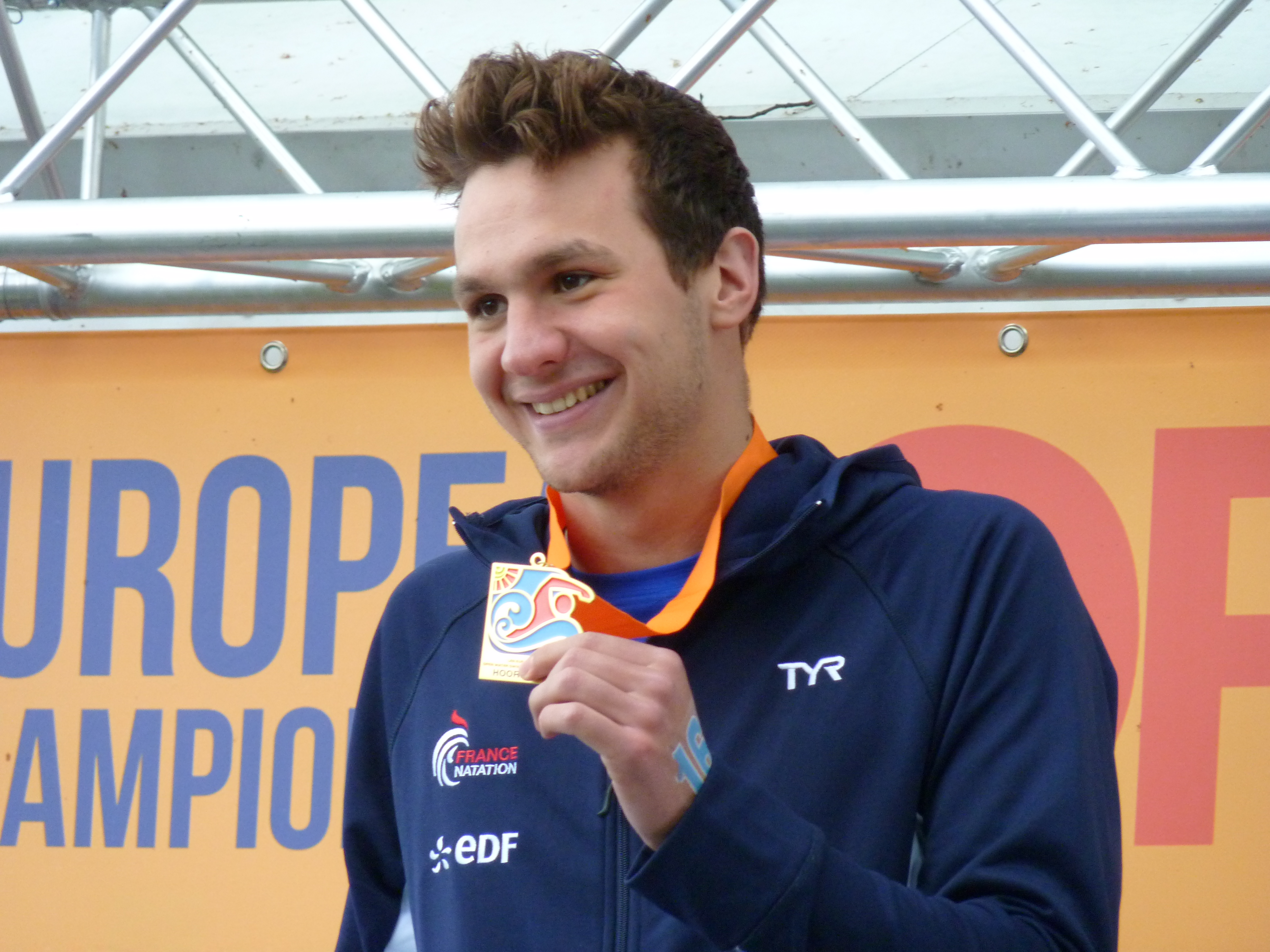
Axel Reymond 2016 European Champion of 25 km – Medal ceremony in Hoorn in the Netherlands

Axel Reymond follow the French Swimmers Team to the European Championship in Berlin (Germany) in 2014. On 17 August 2014, he won the European Gold Medal on 25 km (16 mi) with a time : 4 h 59 min 18 s 8, beating Evgeny Drattsev (Russia) (4 h 59 min 31 s 2) and Edoardo Stochino (Italy) (5 h 08 min 51 s 0). The same year, he will be Champion of France on 25 km (16 mi) at Sète, on indoor 5 km (3.1 mi) at Sarcelles and win a silver medal in Open Water Swimming European Cup in Eilat (Israel) on 10 km (6.2 mi).

He will begin in 2015 with 2 medals : in Gold at the Marathon Swimming World Cup Marathon in Abu Dhabi (United Arab Emirates), and in Bronze in Nouméa (France). He will also conduct a tripled at French Championships in Gravelines, becoming the France Champion on 5 km (3.1 mi), 10 km (6.2 mi) and 25 km (16 mi).

On 7 July 2015, Axel Reymond signed a 2-year contract with French Land Army, to be an element of the French Champions Swimming Military Force. He also participated in the World Military Games Summer 2015 at Mungyeong, in South Korea.

He was highly disappointed about his 4th place position on the 25 km (16 mi) race at the World Championships in Kazan (Russia), and especially to its 12th place in the 10 km (6.2 mi), which, this last one, earned him a non-selection of the French Swimming Federation, to go to represent France at the Rio Olympic Games (Brazil) in 2016. But his year has been full of medals, he ended the 2015 season : at the first place of the French Open Water Cup National Ranking (with 8 stages wins in 11 appearances) and at the 1st place of the French Open Water Swimmers National Ranking. He even gets a number of points in the French Cup, never obtained at least 2005, and the national ranking of open water swimmers, a number of points ever obtained at least 2012.

Finally in 2015, he broke the French National Hour Time Record during the National Meeting in 25-meter pool in Compiègne (France) with 5,859 m (3.641 mi), and he won a bronze medal for the 1,500 m (0.93 mi) of French 2015 Swimming Championships in 25-meter pool in Angers (France).

In early 2016, he joined the CSM Clamart Natation, while staying at Fontainebleau for his exercises in the CitéSport of the National Centre of Defence Sports (CNSD).

He began the 1st stage of the Marathon (10 km (6.2 mi)) World Cup 2016 in Viedma, Argentina, finishing 5th, allowing him his requirement to pre-qualify at the European Championships 2016. He eventually ended as 5th in the 2nd stage of the World Cup Marathon in 2016 in Abu Dhabi in the UAE.

Subsequently, in April 2016, he became champion of the France 2016 Military Swimming 400m freestyle, and 200m medley 4 in Saint-Dizier, beating the record of France of these two events.

On 29 May 2016, at Lake of Cepoy in Montargis (France), he won his fifth title of France Championships on 25 km, after finishing 2nd of the 5 km and 3rd of the 10 km, the Championships of France in 2016.

At the French National Day in Hoorn (Netherlands), on 14 July 2016, he won gold again on 25 km during the 2016 European Championships.

On 28 January 2017, Axel Reymond finished 3rd in the French Open Water Indoor Championships 2017 for 5 km.

At the 2017 French Championships, he finished 3rd French in the 10 km, 1st French in relay 4 x 1,250 m mixed, and French Champion 2017 of the 25 km for the 6th consecutive year.

In Budapest (World Championships in 2017), on 21 July 2017, Axel won the 25 km of the World Championships in 2017 and became the first French Men's World Champion in that distance.

In August 2017, he joined the club of A.A.S. Sarcelles Natation 95.

Between 31 May and 3 June 2018, during the French Open Water Indoor Championships, he became French Champion of the 25 km in open-water for the seventh time, and French Vice-Champion of the 5 km and of the mixed relay 4 x 1,250 m mixed (with his team : A.A.S. Sarcelles Natation 95) at Gravelines.

On 16 June 2018, he participated in the 4th stage of the 2018 Marathon World Cup in open water, and won a bronze medal in 1h55:59.1, Hungary.

Present at the 2018 European Swimming Championships in Glasgow, where he won the silver medal on 5 km, and thus becomes vice-champion of Europe on this distance, and finished 4th of the 25 km.

In Gwangju, 19 July 2019 Axel retains its title of world champion on the 25 km at the 2019 World Swimming Championships.

In Ohrid, the 24th of August 2019, Axel wins the 2019 UltraMarathon World Cup 25 km Open Water Race, and on the 28th of August 2019, the Marathon 10 km World Cup Silver Medal Open Water Race.

Between October 23, 2019, and October 25, 2019, in Wuhan, China, Axel became the 2019 Military World Champion of 10 km, 5 km and relay mixed (5 km) in open water.

On February 28, 2020, in Samoëns, France, Axel became French champion in the 1,000m in icy water by breaking the French record, with 11 minutes 56 seconds 60 (at 1:20 of the world record).

From September 25 to 28, 2020, during the French Championships, he became French Champion in the 25 km in open water for the eighth time, and 3rd in the 5 km and Vice champion of France in the mixed 4 × 1250 m relay (with his team of the A.A.S. Sarcelles Natation 95) in Jablines.

In Budapest (Hungary), on May 16, 2021, where he became world champion, Axel won the 25 km of the 2020-21 European Championships for the 3rd time over this distance.

== Results ==
=== World Championships ===
==== Open water ====
Axel Reymond's Results during the World Open Water Swimming Championships
Edition	Event			
Edition	5 km (3.1 mi)	10 km (6.2 mi)	7.5 km (4.7 mi)	25 km (16 mi)
Canada – Welland 2012	–	–	7th 1 h 26:10.50	–
Spain – Barcelona 2013	–	40th 1 h 50:33.00	–	20th 4 h 53:47.20
Russia – Kazan 2015	22nd 55:31.80	12th 1 h 50:28.40	–	4th 4 h 55:55.80
Hungary Budapest 2017	–	–	–	Gold; 5 h 02:46.40
South Korea Gwangju 2019	–	–	–	Gold; 4 h 51:06.02

=== European Championships ===
==== Open water ====
Axel Reymond's Results during the European Open Water Swimming Championships
Edition	Event		
Edition	5 km (3.1 mi)	10 km (6.2 mi)	25 km (16 mi)
Italy – Piombino 2012	–	15th 1 h 59:57.80	Bronze; 5 h 4:06.30
Germany – Berlin 2014	–	9th 1 h 50:07.60	Gold; 4 h 59:18.80
Netherlands – Hoorn 2016	–	–	Gold; 5 h 02:22.00
Scotland – Glasgow 2018	Silver; 52:41.70	–	4th 4 h 58:03.4
Hungary – Budapest 2020-21	-	7th 1 h 51:49.06	Gold; 4 h 35:59.08

=== French Championships ===
==== Open water ====
Axel Reymond's Results during the Open Water Swimming French Championships
Edition	Event			
Edition	5 km (3.1 mi) Time trial	5 km (3.1 mi)	10 km (6.2 mi)	25 km (16 mi)
France – Chalain 2008	25th 1 h 05:34.50	–	26th 2 h 14:02.79	–
France – Roquebrune – Toulouse – Annecy 2009	24th 1 h 02:12.00	5th 58:32.00	16th 2 h 09:51.60	–
France – Mimizan 2010	8th 56:34.97	5th 59:59.60	5th 2 h 06:02.67	Bronze; 5 h 44:21.58
France – Pierrelatte 2011	16th 56:26.58	7th 59:05.30	14th 1 h 59:17.40	–
France – Pierrelatte 2012	5th 55:39.74	–	Silver; 1 h 55:00.62	Gold; 5 h 06:28.58
France – Canet-en-Roussillon 2013	–	–	Gold; 1 h 42:14.00	Gold; 5 h 28:29.56
France – Sète 2014	Bronze; 1 h 02:41.30	5th 55:43.90	4th 1 h 43:50.40	Gold; 4 h 58:47.30
France – Gravelines 2015	–	Gold; 54:43.80	Gold; 1 h 50:29.50	Gold; 4 h 57:28.50
France – Montargis 2016	–	Silver; 53:51.70	Bronze; 1 h 52:15.30	Gold; 4 h 56:07
France – Gravelines 2017	–	–	Bronze 1 h 52:08.06	Gold; 5 h 02:26.90
France – Gravelines 2018	–	Silver; 52:43.53	4th 1 h 44:28.99	Gold; 5 h 04:20.00
France – Brive-la-Gaillarde 2019	–	4th 53:44.88	–	–
France – Jablines 2020	–	Bronze; 52:51.68	5th 1 h 54:08.90	Gold; 4 h 58:46.69

==== Open water – Indoor ====
Axel Reymond's Results during the Open Water Indoor Swimming French Championships
Edition	Event
Edition	5 km (3.1 mi)
France – Dunkerque 2009	17th 57:53.95
France – Troyes 2010	12th 56:4.96
France – Agen 2011	11th 55:36.30
France – Dunkerque 2012	Silver; 54:14.90
France – Sarcelles 2014	Gold; 53:58.60
France – Sarcelles 2015	5th 55:13.39
France – Sarcelles 2017	Bronze; 54:24.10
France – Sarcelles 2018	6th 54:25.26
France – Sarcelles 2019	Bronze; 54:30.48
France – Sarcelles 2020	11th 55:01.14

==== Frozen water ====
Axel Reymond's Results during the Frozen Water Swimming French Championships
Edition	Event
Edition	1,000 m (0.62 mi)
France – Samoëns 2020	Gold; 11:56.60

==== Long course (50-meter pool) ====
Axel Reymond's Results during the Swimming French Championships (LC)
Edition	Event	
Edition	800 m freestyle	1500 m freestyle
France – Chartres 2014	Bronze; 7 min 58 s 45	Bronze; 15 min 18 s 13

==== Short course meters (25-meter pool) ====
Axel Reymond's Results during the Swimming French Championships (SC)
Edition	Event
Edition	1500 m freestyle
France – Angers 2012	Bronze; 15 min 0 s 40
France – Dijon 2013	Silver; 14 min 48 s 09
France – Angers 2015	Bronze; 14 min 55 s 24

=== World Cup ===
==== Open water ====
Axel Reymond's Results during the Marathon Swimming World Cup
Edition	Event	
Edition	10 km (6.2 mi)	25 km (16 mi)
France – Annecy 2009	36th 2 h 09:51.60	–
North Macedonia – Ohrid 2013	–	Gold; 5 h 09:54.95
Argentina – Videma 2014	13th 1 h 51:44.56	–
United Arab Emirates – Abu Dhabi 2015	Gold; 1 h 57:52.10	–
France – Nouméa 2015	Bronze; 1 h 57:24.40	–
Argentina – Videma 2016	5th 1 h 55:50.15	–
United Arab Emirates – Abu Dhabi 2016	5th 1 h 47:48.20	–
United Arab Emirates – Abu Dhabi 2017	22nd 1 h 46:11.10	–
Qatar – Doha 2018	4th 1 h 52:43.00	–
Hungary – Balatonfured 2018	Bronze; 1 h 55:59.10	–
United Arab Emirates – Abu Dhabi 2018	9th 1 h 53:27.8	–
North Macedonia – Ohrid 2019	Silver; 2 h 00:21.90	Gold; 5 h 20:55.30
Qatar – Doha 2020	18th 1 h 50:07.09	–
Qatar – Doha 2021	5th 1 h 52:14.05	–

=== European Cup ===
==== Open water ====
Axel Reymond's Results during the Open Water Swimming European Cup
Edition	Event		
Edition	5 km (3.1 mi)	10 km (6.2 mi)	25 km (16 mi)
Israel – Eilat 2014	–	Silver; 1 h 49:00.15	–
France – Gravelines 2018	–	4th 1 h 44:28.99	–
Spain – Barcelona 2018	–	1 h 51:06.10	–
Israel – Eilat 2019	–	9th 1 h 53:24.80	–

=== COMEN Cup ===
==== Open water ====
Axel Reymond's Results during the COnfederación MEditerránea de Natación Cup
Edition	Event		
Edition	5 km (3.1 mi)	10 km (6.2 mi)	25 km (16 mi)
Portugal – Oeiras 2010	8th 57:43.34	–	–
Cyprus – Limassol 2011	Bronze; 54:42.32	–	–

=== Open Water Swimming French Cup and National ranking ===
==== Open water ====
Axel Reymond's Results during the Open Water Swimming French Cup
Edition	Open Water Swimming French Cup's National Ranking					French Open Water Swimmer's National Ranking
Edition	15 years old and under	16 and 17 years old	All Categories	Appearance	Number of Victories	French Open Water Swimmer's National Ranking
France – 2008	15th 318 pts	–	73rd 318 pts	1 étape	0	–
France – 2009	Gold; 3 600 pts	–	4th 3 600 pts	14 stages	6 x Gold; 1 x Bronze	–
France – 2010	–	Gold; 5 130 pts	Gold; 5 130 pts	15 stages	9 x Gold; 2 x Silver; 1 x Bronze	–
France – 2011	–	Silver; 4 140 pts	Bronze; 4 140 pts	17 stages	3 x Gold; 6 x Silver; 4 x Bronze	–
France – 2012	–	–	Gold; 4 140 pts	9 stages	3 x Gold; 2 x Silver; 2 x Bronze	Gold; 30 540 pts
France – 2013	–	–	6th 2 590 pts	4 stages	2 x Gold; 2 x Silver	4th 13 840 pts
France – 2014	–	–	Silver; 4 160 pts	7 stages	6 x Gold; 1 x Silver	Gold; 44 660 pts
France – 2015	–	–	Gold; 7 120 pts	9 stages	7 x Gold; 1 x Silver; 1 x Bronze	Gold; 51 020 pts (point record since 2012)
France – 2016	–	–	Gold; 7 270 pts (point record since 2005)	10 stages	9 x Gold; 1 x Bronze	Silver; 33 670 pts
France – 2017	–	–	4th 5 390 pts	9 stages	8 x Gold; 1 x Bronze	Bronze; 39 140 pts
France – 2018	–	–	6th 5 490 pts	6 stages	4 x Gold; 1 x Silver	Gold; 40 140 pts
France – 2019	–	–	18th 42 500 pts	7 stages	4 x Gold; 2 x Silver	Gold; 23 450 pts
France – 2020	–	–	Silver; 41 200 pts	5 stages	2 x Gold; 1 x Silver; 1 x Bronze	Gold; 17 550 pts

== Records ==
=== French records ===
This table details the record of France beaten by Axel Reymond during his career.

Individual French Records beaten by Axel Reymond
Event	Time	Competition	Place	Date
France record of 1000m freestyle in frozen water	11:56.60	France Frozen Water Swimming Championships 2020	Samoëns, France	28 February 2020
France record of military Swimming 400m freestyle	3:55.53	France Military Swimming Championships 2016	Saint-Dizier, France	6 April 2016
France record of military Swimming 200m medley 4	2:07.00	France Military Swimming Championships 2016	Saint-Dizier, France	6 April 2016
French Men's Swimming Hour Records of France	1 h 5,859.25 m (3.64077 mi)	2015 Autumn National Meeting	Compiègne, France	15 November 2015
French Men's 5 km indoor Records of France – Category 18-year-old	54:14.90	French 2012 Indoor Championships of Open Water	Dunkerque, France	1 May 2012 defeated in 2016 by Anis Cheniti

== Awards ==
- Winner of the 2011 "Hope" Trophy in Savigny-le-Temple
- Winner of the 2012 "Hope" Trophy in Savigny-le-Temple
- 2016 Honor Citizen of Fontainebleau City
