= Mario Sanzullo =

Italian swimmer (born 1993)

Personal information
- National team: Italy
- Born: 5 June 1993 (age 33) Massa di Somma, Italy
- Height: 1.80 m (5 ft 11 in)
- Weight: 75 kg (165 lb)

Sport
- Sport: Swimming
- Strokes: Freestyle
- Club: Fiamme Oro
Medal record
Men's swimming
Representing Italy
World Championships
Silver medal – second place	2017 Budapest	5 km open water
Bronze medal – third place	2017 Budapest	Team event
European Championships
Gold medal – first place	2022 Rome	25 km open water
Summer Universiade
Bronze medal – third place	2015 Gwangju	10 km open water

Mario Sanzullo (born 5 June 1993) is an Italian open water swimmer who won two medals at the World Championships. He competed at the 2020 Summer Olympics, in 10 km open water.

== Biography ==
On 15 July 2019 Sanzullo had obtained, together with Gregorio Paltrinieri, the qualification for the marathon 10 km of Tokyo 2020, the Olympic Games postponed to 2021 due to the Coronavirus.

== Achievements ==
Year	Competition	Venue	Position	Event	Time
2015	Universiade	(South Korea) Gwangju	3rd	10 km	1:55:11.0
2017	World Championships	(Hungary) Budapest	2nd	5 km	54:32.1
2017	World Championships	(Hungary) Budapest	3rd	Team	54:31.0
2022	European Championships	Italy	1st	25 km	

== See also ==
- Italy at the 2020 Summer Olympics
