= Diving at the 2022 World Aquatics Championships – Men's 10 metre platform =

Men's 10 metre platform at the 2022 World Aquatics Championships
- Venue: Danube Arena
- Location: Budapest, Hungary
- Dates: 2 July (preliminary and semifinal); 3 July (final)
- Competitors: 39 from 25 nations
- Winning points: 515.55

Medalists
gold medal	Yang Jian	China
silver medal	Rikuto Tamai	Japan
bronze medal	Yang Hao	China

The Men's 10 metre platform competition at the 2022 World Aquatics Championships was held on 2 and 3 July 2022.

== Results ==
The preliminary round was started on 2 July at 10:00. The semifinal was held on 2 July at 16:00. The final was held on 3 July at 17:00.

Green denotes finalists

Blue denotes semifinalists

Rank	Diver	Nationality	Preliminary		Semifinal		Final	
Rank	Diver	Nationality	Points	Rank	Points	Rank	Points	Rank
1st place, gold medalist(s)	Yang Jian	China	495.65	1	503.85	2	515.55	1
2nd place, silver medalist(s)	Rikuto Tamai	Japan	455.50	3	471.95	3	488.00	2
3rd place, bronze medalist(s)	Yang Hao	China	468.20	2	520.30	1	485.45	3
4	Cassiel Rousseau	Australia	424.85	6	442.90	6	481.15	4
5	Noah Williams	Great Britain	405.00	9	430.05	7	479.05	5
6	Oleksiy Sereda	Ukraine	437.55	4	458.80	4	477.45	6
7	Nathan Zsombor-Murray	Canada	400.25	10	421.50	8	446.55	7
8	Matty Lee	Great Britain	410.30	8	448.40	5	426.15	8
9	Rylan Wiens	Canada	415.15	7	419.25	9	416.20	9
10	Samuel Fricker	Australia	373.45	13	418.25	10	391.15	10
11	Josh Hedberg	United States	429.15	5	388.60	11	375.10	11
12	Shu Ohkubo	Japan	381.10	12	373.75	12	370.25	12
13	Zachary Cooper	United States	382.45	11	373.05	13	Did not advance	
14	Timo Barthel	Germany	365.30	17	366.20	14	Did not advance	
15	Isaac Souza	Brazil	356.30	18	365.20	15	Did not advance	
16	Carlos Ramos	Cuba	372.20	15	359.30	16	Did not advance	
17	Luis Cañabate	Cuba	372.45	14	353.95	17	Did not advance	
18	Andreas Larsen	Italy	369.70	16	296.05	18	Did not advance	
19	Jellson Jabillin	Malaysia	353.10	19	Did not advance			
20	Kawan Pereira	Brazil	350.50	20	Did not advance			
21	Constantin Popovici	Romania	345.10	21	Did not advance			
22	Leonardo García	Colombia	336.60	22	Did not advance			
23	Athanasios Tsirikos	Greece	333.70	23	Did not advance			
24	Robert Łukaszewicz	Poland	332.10	24	Did not advance			
25	Emanuel Vázquez	Puerto Rico	329.05	25	Did not advance			
26	Yevhen Naumenko	Ukraine	326.25	26	Did not advance			
27	Jaden Eikermann	Germany	325.20	27	Did not advance			
28	Hanis Jaya Surya	Malaysia	317.80	28	Did not advance			
29	Jesús González	Venezuela	310.00	29	Did not advance			
30	Mohamed Farouk	Egypt	307.55	30	Did not advance			
31	Luke Sipkes	New Zealand	303.00	31	Did not advance			
32	Anton Knoll	Austria	301.10	32	Did not advance			
33	Vladimir Harutyunyan	Armenia	288.55	33	Did not advance			
34	Tonantzin Fernández	Mexico	288.45	34	Did not advance			
35	Nathan Brown	New Zealand	282.60	35	Did not advance			
36	Siddharth Bajrang	India	281.95	36	Did not advance			
37	Eduard Timbretti	Italy	279.85	37	Did not advance			
38	Ahmad Qali	Kuwait	276.70	38	Did not advance			
39	Ramez Sobhy	Egypt	255.05	39	Did not advance			
