= Diving at the 2022 World Aquatics Championships – Women's 3 metre springboard =

Women's 3 metre springboard at the 2022 World Aquatics Championships
- Venue: Danube Arena
- Location: Budapest, Hungary
- Dates: 1 July (preliminary and semifinal); 2 July (final)
- Competitors: 38 from 25 nations
- Winning points: 366.90

Medalists
gold medal	Chen Yiwen	China
silver medal	Mia Vallée	Canada
bronze medal	Chang Yani	China

The Women's 3 metre springboard competition at the 2022 World Aquatics Championships was held on 1 and 2 July 2022.

== Results ==
The preliminary round was started on 1 July at 10:00. The semifinal was held on 1 July at 16:00.

Green denotes finalists

Blue denotes semifinalists

Rank	Diver	Nationality	Preliminary		Semifinal		Final	
Rank	Diver	Nationality	Points	Rank	Points	Rank	Points	Rank
1st place, gold medalist(s)	Chen Yiwen	China	357.95	1	356.45	1	366.90	1
2nd place, silver medalist(s)	Mia Vallée	Canada	304.95	4	300.45	4	329.00	2
3rd place, bronze medalist(s)	Chang Yani	China	341.25	2	345.80	2	325.85	3
4	Tina Punzel	Germany	294.30	7	285.00	8	315.60	4
5	Sarah Bacon	United States	324.60	3	294.60	7	314.25	5
6	Michelle Heimberg	Switzerland	292.85	8	277.80	11	301.95	6
7	Sayaka Mikami	Japan	209.65	6	297.00	6	294.20	7
8	Grace Reid	Great Britain	254.00	18	272.00	12	292.90	8
9	Chiara Pellacani	Italy	268.80	15	303.75	3	291.60	9
10	Haruka Enomoto	Japan	273.45	14	280.90	10	281.05	10
11	Emilia Nilsson	Sweden	292.80	9	283.55	9	265.20	11
12	Lena Hentschel	Germany	276.60	12	297.60	5	262.55	12
13	Kristen Hayden	United States	302.00	5	270.30	13	did not advance	
14	Luana Lira	Brazil	281.20	11	270.15	14	did not advance	
15	Emma Gullstrand	Sweden	267.30	16	266.30	15	did not advance	
16	Kim Su-ji	South Korea	273.75	13	257.05	16	did not advance	
17	Arantxa Chávez	Mexico	282.60	10	255.35	17	did not advance	
18	Maha Eissa	Egypt	255.30	17	230.20	18	did not advance	
19	Madeline Coquoz	Switzerland	252.55	19	did not advance			
20	Lauren Hallaselkä	Finland	250.80	20	did not advance			
21	Estilla Mosena	Hungary	244.80	21	did not advance			
22	Georgia Sheehan	Australia	241.70	22	did not advance			
23	Clare Cryan	Ireland	238.75	23	did not advance			
24	Viviana Uribe	Colombia	238.70	24	did not advance			
25	Yasmin Harper	Great Britain	236.90	25	did not advance			
26	Helle Tuxen	Norway	234.75	26	did not advance			
27	Brittany O'Brien	Australia	233.70	27	did not advance			
28	Daniela Zapata	Colombia	230.60	28	did not advance			
29	Margo Erlam	Canada	224.00	29	did not advance			
30	Anna Lucia Rodrigues	Brazil	219.70	30	did not advance			
31	Gabriela Gutiérrez	Mexico	217.20	31	did not advance			
32	Ana Ricci	Peru	215.65	32	did not advance			
33	Aleksandra Błażowska	Poland	199.50	33	did not advance			
34	Maggie Squire	New Zealand	197.80	34	did not advance			
35	Elizabeth Miclau	Puerto Rico	187.15	35	did not advance			
36	Ong Ker Ying	Malaysia	186.00	36	did not advance			
37	Emma Veisz	Hungary	179.95	37	did not advance			
38	Gladies Haga	Indonesia	165.45	38	did not advance			
