= Diving at the 2022 World Aquatics Championships – Team event =

Team event at the 2022 World Aquatics Championships
- Venue: Danube Arena
- Location: Budapest, Hungary
- Dates: 29 June
- Competitors: 26 from 13 nations
- Teams: 13
- Winning points: 391.40

Medalists
gold medal	Quan Hongchan; Bai Yuming	China
silver medal	Jade Gillet; Alexis Jandard	France
bronze medal	James Heatly; Andrea Spendolini-Sirieix	Great Britain

The Team event competition at the 2022 World Aquatics Championships was held on 29 June 2022.

== Results ==
The event was started at 14:30.

Rank	Nation	Divers	Points
1st place, gold medalist(s)	China	Quan Hongchan; Bai Yuming	391.40
2nd place, silver medalist(s)	France	Jade Gillet; Alexis Jandard	358.50
3rd place, bronze medalist(s)	Great Britain	Andrea Spendolini-Sirieix; James Heatly	357.60
4	Germany	Elena Wassen; Timo Barthel	354.35
5	Malaysia	Ooi Tze Liang; Pandelela Rinong	350.25
6	Brazil	Rafael Fogaça; Ingrid Oliveira	348.45
7	South Korea	Cho Eun-bi; Yi Jaeg-yeong	332.85
8	United States	Daryn Wright; Maxwell Flory	319.60
9	Australia	Samuel Fricker; Charli Petrov	318.45
10	Mexico	Viviana Del Ángel; Kevin Muñoz	289.35
11	Colombia	Leonardo García; Viviana Uribe	270.85
12	Cuba	Anisley García; Luis Cañabate	237.55
13	New Zealand	Liam Stone; Mikali Dawson	227.90
