= Diving at the 2022 World Aquatics Championships – Women's 1 metre springboard =

Women's 1 metre springboard at the 2022 World Aquatics Championships
- Venue: Danube Arena
- Location: Budapest, Hungary
- Dates: 29 June (preliminary and final)
- Competitors: 46 from 29 nations
- Winning points: 300.85

Medalists
gold medal	Li Yajie	China
silver medal	Sarah Bacon	United States
bronze medal	Mia Vallée	Canada

The Women's 1 metre springboard competition at the 2022 World Aquatics Championships was held on 29 June 2022.

== Results ==
The preliminary round was started at 10:00. The final was held at 17:00.

Green denotes finalists

Rank	Diver	Nationality	Preliminary		Final	
Rank	Diver	Nationality	Points	Rank	Points	Rank
1st place, gold medalist(s)	Li Yajie	China	278.95	1	300.85	1
2nd place, silver medalist(s)	Sarah Bacon	United States	257.15	3	276.65	2
3rd place, bronze medalist(s)	Mia Vallée	Canada	249.60	9	276.60	3
4	Chiara Pellacani	Italy	251.05	7	269.25	4
5	Georgia Sheehan	Australia	252.90	6	260.95	5
6	Grace Reid	Great Britain	254.85	4	257.50	6
7	Jette Müller	Germany	249.45	10	256.15	7
8	Michelle Heimberg	Switzerland	253.10	5	255.60	8
9	Margo Erlam	Canada	250.75	8	246.10	9
10	Brooke Schultz	United States	246.45	11	244.20	10
11	Emilia Nilsson	Sweden	262.95	2	241.05	11
12	Emma Gullstrand	Sweden	246.10	12	225.55	12
13	Elena Bertocchi	Italy	246.05	13	did not advance	
14	Esther Qin	Australia	243.20	14	did not advance	
15	Yasmin Harper	Great Britain	241.50	15	did not advance	
16	Daphne Wils	Netherlands	236.90	16	did not advance	
17	Saskia Oettinghaus	Germany	236.55	17	did not advance	
18	Kim Su-ji	South Korea	234.95	18	did not advance	
19	Arantxa Chávez	Mexico	231.60	19	did not advance	
20	Kaja Skrzek	Poland	228.20	20	did not advance	
21	Diana Pineda	Colombia	226.25	21	did not advance	
22	Daniela Zapata	Colombia	222.50	22	did not advance	
23	Lauren Hallaselkä	Finland	222.30	23	did not advance	
24	Maha Gouda	Egypt	221.30	24	did not advance	
25	Anna Lucia Rodrigues	Brazil	220.25	25	did not advance	
26	Maha Eissa	Egypt	217.40	26	did not advance	
27	Aleksandra Błażowska	Poland	216.15	27	did not advance	
28	Ong Ker Ying	Malaysia	214.60	28	did not advance	
29	Gladies Haga	Indonesia	214.00	29	did not advance	
30	Nais Gilles	France	213.40	30	did not advance	
31	Džeja Patrika	Latvia	213.35	31	did not advance	
32	Madeline Coquoz	Switzerland	206.35	32	did not advance	
33	Clare Cryan	Ireland	203.60	33	did not advance	
34	Bailey Heydra	South Africa	200.45	34	did not advance	
35	Luana Lira	Brazil	198.20	35	did not advance	
36	Natalia Mayorga	Mexico	195.55	36	did not advance	
37	Estilla Mosena	Hungary	194.15	37	did not advance	
38	Helle Tuxen	Norway	189.55	38	did not advance	
39	Cho Eun-bi	South Korea	187.75	39	did not advance	
40	Emma Veisz	Hungary	187.50	40	did not advance	
41	Maggie Squire	New Zealand	185.50	41	did not advance	
42	Zalika Methula	South Africa	184.20	42	did not advance	
43	Ana Ricci	Peru	178.05	43	did not advance	
44	Caroline Kupka	Norway	161.80	44	did not advance	
45	Lai Yu-yen	Chinese Taipei	145.70	45	did not advance	
–	Alisa Zakaryan	Armenia	Withdrawn			
