= Diving at the 2022 World Aquatics Championships – Women's 10 metre platform =

Women's 10 metre platform at the 2022 World Aquatics Championships
- Venue: Danube Arena
- Location: Budapest, Hungary
- Dates: 26 June (preliminary and semifinal); 27 June (final)
- Competitors: 33 from 23 nations
- Winning points: 417.25

Medalists
gold medal	Chen Yuxi	China
silver medal	Quan Hongchan	China
bronze medal	Pandelela Rinong	Malaysia

The Women's 10 metre platform competition at the 2022 World Aquatics Championships was held on 26 and 27 June 2022.

== Results ==
The preliminary round was started on 26 June at 12:00. The semifinal was held on 26 June at 19:00. The final was started on 27 June at 19:00.

Green denotes finalists

Blue denotes semifinalists

Rank	Diver	Nationality	Preliminary		Semifinal		Final	
Rank	Diver	Nationality	Points	Rank	Points	Rank	Points	Rank
1st place, gold medalist(s)	Chen Yuxi	China	413.95	1	427.00	1	417.25	1
2nd place, silver medalist(s)	Quan Hongchan	China	410.85	2	413.70	2	416.95	2
3rd place, bronze medalist(s)	Pandelela Rinong	Malaysia	332.10	4	313.15	7	338.85	3
4	Ingrid Oliveira	Brazil	340.70	3	334.30	4	327.10	4
5	Caeli McKay	Canada	320.35	6	336.30	3	318.45	5
6	Matsuri Arai	Japan	270.60	17	316.70	5	307.00	6
7	Sarah Jodoin Di Maria	Italy	275.25	15	302.05	9	295.65	7
8	Emily Boyd	Australia	280.60	14	284.70	12	294.10	8
9	Daryn Wright	United States	303.45	7	302.00	10	277.10	9
10	Nikita Hains	Australia	270.40	18	314.80	6	270.60	10
11	Guurtje Praasterink	Netherlands	287.80	11	289.80	11	268.55	11
12	Christina Wassen	Germany	272.05	16	303.55	8	253.80	12
13	Maycey Vieta	Puerto Rico	288.10	10	280.90	13	did not advance	
14	Sofiya Lyskun	Ukraine	323.65	5	279.40	14	did not advance	
15	Maggie Merriman	United States	291.90	9	269.30	15	did not advance	
16	Pauline Pfeif	Germany	282.00	12	260.10	16	did not advance	
17	Viviana Del Ángel	Mexico	295.15	8	227.25	17	did not advance	
18	Anisley García	Cuba	281.10	13	225.90	18	did not advance	
19	Andrea Spendolini-Sirieix	Great Britain	268.20	19	did not advance			
20	Viviana Uribe	Colombia	259.15	20	did not advance			
21	Minami Itahashi	Japan	239.75	21	did not advance			
22	Nicoleta-Angelica Muscalu	Romania	236.15	22	did not advance			
23	Maia Biginelli	Italy	235.90	23	did not advance			
24	Cho Eun-bi	South Korea	232.80	24	did not advance			
25	Jade Gillet	France	231.15	25	did not advance			
26	Eden Cheng	Great Britain	231.00	26	did not advance			
27	Ciara McGing	Ireland	230.60	27	did not advance			
28	Maha Gouda	Egypt	228.15	28	did not advance			
29	Helle Tuxen	Norway	214.75	29	did not advance			
30	Samantha Jiménez	Mexico	177.65	30	did not advance			
31	Farida Moussa	Egypt	174.70	31	did not advance			
32	Mikali Dawson	New Zealand	174.25	32	did not advance			
33	Mariana Osorio	Colombia	158.05	33	did not advance			
