= Diving at the 2022 World Aquatics Championships – Men's 1 metre springboard =

Men's 1 metre springboard at the 2022 World Aquatics Championships
- Venue: Danube Arena
- Location: Budapest, Hungary
- Dates: 30 June (preliminary and final)
- Competitors: 48 from 31 nations
- Winning points: 493.30

Medalists
gold medal	Wang Zongyuan	China
silver medal	Jack Laugher	Great Britain
bronze medal	Li Shixin	Australia

The Men's 1 metre springboard competition at the 2022 World Aquatics Championships was held on 30 June 2022.

== Results ==
The preliminary round was started at 12:00. The final was held at 19:00.

Green denotes finalists

Rank	Diver	Nationality	Preliminary		Final	
Rank	Diver	Nationality	Points	Rank	Points	Rank
1st place, gold medalist(s)	Wang Zongyuan	China	380.95	2	493.30	1
2nd place, silver medalist(s)	Jack Laugher	Great Britain	363.70	9	426.95	2
3rd place, bronze medalist(s)	Li Shixin	Australia	364.95	7	395.40	3
4	Jules Bouyer	France	364.50	8	381.30	4
5	Sebastián Morales	Colombia	358.10	12	374.90	5
6	Jordan Rzepka	United States	365.80	6	372.05	6
7	Yona Knight-Wisdom	Jamaica	359.10	11	370.90	7
8	Zheng Jiuyuan	China	375.75	3	365.55	8
9	Jonathan Ruvalcaba	Dominican Republic	359.35	10	346.15	9
10	Giovanni Tocci	Italy	396.15	1	326.75	10
11	Rikuto Tamai	Japan	366.70	5	326.60	11
12	Tyler Downs	United States	367.40	4	293.10	12
13	Jonathan Suckow	Switzerland	355.35	13	did not advance	
14	Alexis Jandard	France	352.05	14	did not advance	
15	Lorenzo Marsaglia	Italy	350.60	15	did not advance	
16	Guillaume Dutoit	Switzerland	342.00	16	did not advance	
17	Kevin Muñoz	Mexico	341.40	17	did not advance	
18	Jordan Houlden	Great Britain	340.95	18	did not advance	
19	Yi Jaeg-yeong	South Korea	333.30	19	did not advance	
20	Timo Barthel	Germany	329.15	20	did not advance	
21	Lars Rüdiger	Germany	327.85	21	did not advance	
22	Liam Stone	New Zealand	326.35	22	did not advance	
23	David Ekdahl	Sweden	323.60	23	did not advance	
24	Andrzej Rzeszutek	Poland	322.90	24	did not advance	
25	Frandiel Gómez	Dominican Republic	322.10	25	did not advance	
26	Carlos Escalona	Cuba	319.90	26	did not advance	
27	Yolotl Martínez	Mexico	315.85	27	did not advance	
28	Dariush Lotfi	Austria	315.40	28	did not advance	
29	Mohamed Farouk	Egypt	314.95	29	did not advance	
30	Stanislav Oliferchyk	Ukraine	312.80	30	did not advance	
31	Alberto Arévalo	Spain	311.35	31	did not advance	
32	Theofilos Afthinos	Greece	308.45	32	did not advance	
33	Johan Morell	Cuba	300.70	33	did not advance	
34	Alejandro Arias	Colombia	296.10	34	did not advance	
35	Rafael Fogaça	Brazil	288.65	35	did not advance	
36	Donato Neglia	Chile	280.45	36	did not advance	
37	Oleh Kolodiy	Ukraine	277.65	37	did not advance	
38	Adrián Abadía	Spain	277.50	38	did not advance	
39	Juho Junttila	Finland	273.90	39	did not advance	
40	Tornike Onikashvili	Georgia	259.90	40	did not advance	
41	Sebastian Konecki	Lithuania	257.50	41	did not advance	
42	Abdulrahman Abbas	Kuwait	254.50	42	did not advance	
43	Nikolaj Schaller	Austria	253.00	43	did not advance	
44	Hasan Qali	Kuwait	249.05	44	did not advance	
45	Athanasios Tsirikos	Greece	247.05	45	did not advance	
46	Gabriel Daim	Malaysia	232.55	46	did not advance	
47	Irakli Sakandelidze	Georgia	230.20	47	did not advance	
48	Chawanwat Juntaphadawon	Thailand	228.50	48	did not advance	
