= Diving at the 2022 World Aquatics Championships – Men's 3 metre springboard =

Men's 3 metre springboard at the 2022 World Aquatics Championships
- Venue: Danube Arena
- Location: Budapest, Hungary
- Dates: 27 June (preliminary and semifinal); 28 June (final)
- Competitors: 55 from 33 nations
- Winning points: 561.95

Medalists
gold medal	Wang Zongyuan	China
silver medal	Cao Yuan	China
bronze medal	Jack Laugher	Great Britain

The Men's 3 metre springboard competition at the 2022 World Aquatics Championships was held on 27 and 28 June 2022.

== Results ==
The preliminary round was started on 27 June at 09:00. The semifinal was started on 27 June at 16:00. The final was held on 28 June at 16:00.

Green denotes finalists

Blue denotes semifinalists

Rank	Diver	Nationality	Preliminary		Semifinal		Final	
Rank	Diver	Nationality	Points	Rank	Points	Rank	Points	Rank
1st place, gold medalist(s)	Wang Zongyuan	China	492.00	1	547.95	1	561.95	1
2nd place, silver medalist(s)	Cao Yuan	China	418.55	3	482.50	2	492.85	2
3rd place, bronze medalist(s)	Jack Laugher	Great Britain	457.80	2	469.65	3	473.30	3
4	Luis Uribe	Colombia	402.55	4	411.70	4	457.15	4
5	Alexis Jandard	France	401.60	6	394.40	8	427.50	5
6	Sho Sakai	Japan	401.95	5	360.95	12	424.00	6
7	Jules Bouyer	France	384.75	12	406.90	6	421.70	7
8	Guillaume Dutoit	Switzerland	370.55	15	361.20	11	394.10	8
9	Jordan Houlden	Great Britain	385.35	11	397.15	7	390.60	9
10	Rafael Fogaça	Brazil	397.30	7	383.35	10	365.40	10
11	Alberto Arévalo	Spain	378.40	13	356.95	13	360.50	11
12	Haruki Suyama	Japan	364.45	18	392.75	9	344.90	12
13	Moritz Wesemann	Germany	390.35	9	408.15	5	Withdrawn	
14	Lorenzo Marsaglia	Italy	369.10	16	355.50	14	Did not advance	
15	Yona Knight-Wisdom	Jamaica	391.65	8	354.65	15	Did not advance	
16	Carlos Escalona	Cuba	366.70	17	327.05	16	Did not advance	
17	Alex Hart	Austria	371.90	14	325.40	17	Did not advance	
18	Sebastián Morales	Colombia	389.30	10	315.30	18	Did not advance	
19	Jonathan Suckow	Switzerland	364.40	19	Did not advance			
20	Tyler Downs	United States	362.55	20	Did not advance			
21	Nicolás García	Spain	360.35	21	Did not advance			
22	Bryden Hattie	Canada	360.00	22	Did not advance			
23	Emmanuel Vázquez	Puerto Rico	358.60	23	Did not advance			
24	Jonathan Ruvalcaba	Dominican Republic	358.45	24	Did not advance			
25	Lou Massenberg	Germany	353.80	25	Did not advance			
26	Frandiel Gómez	Dominican Republic	351.75	26	Did not advance			
27	Yolotl Martínez	Mexico	350.15	27	Did not advance			
28	Samuel Fricker	Australia	347.30	28	Did not advance			
28	Yi Jaeg-yeong	South Korea	347.30	28	Did not advance			
30	Donato Neglia	Chile	347.15	30	Did not advance			
31	Carson Tyler	United States	346.75	31	Did not advance			
32	Li Shixin	Australia	344.90	32	Did not advance			
33	Chawanwat Juntaphadawon	Thailand	333.70	33	Did not advance			
34	Mohab Ishak	Egypt	329.25	34	Did not advance			
35	Muhammad Syafiq Puteh	Malaysia	327.35	35	Did not advance			
36	Giovanni Tocci	Italy	327.00	36	Did not advance			
37	Athanasios Tsirikos	Greece	322.85	37	Did not advance			
38	Andrzej Rzeszutek	Poland	315.35	38	Did not advance			
39	Theofilos Afthinos	Greece	312.20	39	Did not advance			
40	Diego Carquin	Chile	312.15	40	Did not advance			
41	Sandro Melikidze	Georgia	302.05	41	Did not advance			
42	Liam Stone	New Zealand	296.60	42	Did not advance			
43	Tornike Onikashvili	Georgia	284.25	43	Did not advance			
44	Jesús González	Venezuela	283.90	44	Did not advance			
45	Johan Morell	Cuba	281.30	45	Did not advance			
46	Frazer Tavener	New Zealand	276.10	46	Did not advance			
47	Dariush Lotfi	Austria	274.20	47	Did not advance			
48	Abdulrahman Abbas	Kuwait	269.05	48	Did not advance			
49	Kevin Muñoz	Mexico	265.95	49	Did not advance			
50	Danylo Konovalov	Ukraine	260.65	50	Did not advance			
51	Chew Yiwei	Malaysia	255.65	51	Did not advance			
52	David Ekdahl	Sweden	250.10	52	Did not advance			
53	Mostafa Reyad	Egypt	238.70	53	Did not advance			
54	Rafael Borges	Brazil	236.30	54	Did not advance			
55	Kamronbek Khodjimov	Uzbekistan	106.65	55	Did not advance			
