= Swimming at the 2022 World Aquatics Championships – Men's 100 metre butterfly =

Men's 100 metre butterfly at the 2022 World Aquatics Championships
- Venue: Danube Arena
- Location: Budapest, Hungary
- Dates: 23 June (heats and semifinals); 24 June (final)
- Competitors: 66 from 57 nations
- Winning time: 50.14

Medalists
gold medal	Kristóf Milák	Hungary
silver medal	Naoki Mizunuma	Japan
bronze medal	Joshua Liendo	Canada

The Men's 100 metre butterfly competition at the 2022 World Aquatics Championships was held on 23 and 24 June 2022.

== Records ==
Prior to the competition, the existing world and championship records were as follows.

World record	Caeleb Dressel (USA)	49.45	Tokyo, Japan	31 July 2021
Competition record	Caeleb Dressel (USA)	49.50	Gwangju, South Korea	26 July 2019

== Results ==
=== Heats ===
The heats were started on 23 June at 09:00.

Rank	Heat	Lane	Name	Nationality	Time	Notes
1	6	4	Kristóf Milák	Hungary	50.68	Q
2	7	3	Joshua Liendo	Canada	50.97	Q
3	7	5	Noè Ponti	Switzerland	51.17	Q
4	6	1	Simon Bucher	Austria	51.18	Q, NR
5	5	5	Naoki Mizunuma	Japan	51.46	Q
6	6	3	Jakub Majerski	Poland	51.50	Q
7	6	5	Michael Andrew	United States	51.57	Q
8	5	3	James Guy	Great Britain	51.68	Q
9	6	7	Piero Codia	Italy	51.69	Q
10	5	2	Jacob Peters	Great Britain	51.75	Q
11	7	6	Katsuhiro Matsumoto	Japan	51.78	Q
12	5	4	Matthew Temple	Australia	51.86	Q
13	6	6	Federico Burdisso	Italy	51.92	Q
14	6	0	Gal Cohen Groumi	Israel	51.96	Q
15	7	2	Nyls Korstanje	Netherlands	51.97	Q
16	5	1	Tomer Frankel	Israel	52.12	Q
17	7	7	Wang Changhao	China	52.15	
18	6	2	Matheus Gonche	Brazil	52.27	
19	4	4	Jan Eric Friese	Germany	52.39	
20	7	1	Youssef Ramadan	Egypt	52.42	
21	3	4	Rasmus Nickelsen	Denmark	52.54	
22	5	7	Kyle Chalmers	Australia	52.70	
23	4	3	Clément Secchi	France	52.76	
24	3	6	Konstantinos Stamou	Greece	52.77	
25	4	0	Jorge Eliezer Otaiza Hernandez	Venezuela	52.78	
25	7	8	Vinicius Lanza	Brazil	52.78	
27	4	5	Wang Kuan-hung	Chinese Taipei	52.80	
28	4	1	Alex Ahtiainen	Estonia	52.86	
29	7	9	Chen Juner	China	52.91	
30	4	6	Alberto Lozano	Spain	52.98	
31	5	8	Finlay Knox	Canada	53.05	
32	4	2	Adilbek Mussin	Kazakhstan	53.09	
33	3	5	Navaphat Wongcharoen	Thailand	53.20	
34	4	7	José Ángel Martínez	Mexico	53.22	
35	5	0	Antani Ivanov	Bulgaria	53.36	
36	6	9	Louis Croenen	Belgium	53.38	
37	4	8	Deividas Margevičius	Lithuania	53.44	
38	3	8	Oskar Hoff	Sweden	53.58	
38	4	9	Moon Seung-woo	South Korea	53.58	
40	3	9	Adam Halas	Slovakia	54.02	
41	6	8	Matthew Sates	South Africa	54.17	
42	3	2	Sajan Prakash	India	54.39	
43	2	4	Steven Aimable	Senegal	54.65	
44	3	7	Abeku Jackson	Ghana	54.67	
45	3	1	Nicholas Lim	Hong Kong	54.77	
46	2	6	Tomas Lomero Arenas	Andorra	55.04	NR
47	3	0	Mehrshad Afghari	Iran	55.12	
48	2	3	Felipe Baffico	Chile	55.32	
49	2	7	Yousuf Al-Matrooshi	United Arab Emirates	55.37	
50	2	2	Esteban Nuñez Del Prado	Bolivia	55.61	
51	3	3	Glenn Sutanto	Indonesia	55.94	
52	1	1	Mathieu Bachmann	Egypt	56.85	
53	1	0	Gerald Hernández	Nicaragua	57.75	
54	2	1	Collins Saliboko	Tanzania	57.90	
55	1	3	Mahmoud Abu Gharbieh	Palestine	58.36	
56	2	0	Raphael Emmanuel Grand'Pierre	Haiti	59.08	
57	1	6	Jenebi Benoit	Grenada	59.63	
58	1	2	Mohamad Masoud	FINA Refugee Team	59.78	
59	2	8	Finau Ohuafi	Tonga	59.83	
60	1	9	Abdulhai Abdulmenem Sh Ashour	Libya	1:00.68	
61	2	9	Isihaka Irankunda	Rwanda	1:02.25	
62	1	8	Israel Poppe	Guam	1:02.72	
63	1	7	Nasser Saif Al Kindi	Kuwait	1:03.73	
64	1	5	Kinley Lhendup	Bhutan	1:04.07	
65	1	4	Simanga Dlamini	Eswatini	1:04.46	
	2	5	Salvador Gordo	Angola	Did not start	
	5	6	Szebasztián Szabó	Hungary	Did not start	
	7	0	Chad Le Clos	South Africa	Did not start	
	7	4	Caeleb Dressel	United States	Did not start	
	5	9	Teong Tzen Wei	Singapore	Disqualified	

=== Semifinals ===
The semifinals were started on 23 June at 18:10.

Rank	Heat	Lane	Name	Nationality	Time	Notes
1	2	4	Kristóf Milák	Hungary	50.14	Q
2	2	3	Naoki Mizunuma	Japan	50.81	Q, NR
3	1	4	Joshua Liendo	Canada	51.14	Q
4	2	5	Noè Ponti	Switzerland	51.18	Q
5	1	5	Simon Bucher	Austria	51.22	Q
6	1	3	Jakub Majerski	Poland	51.24	Q
6	1	7	Matthew Temple	Australia	51.24	Q
8	2	6	Michael Andrew	United States	51.28	Q
9	2	8	Nyls Korstanje	Netherlands	51.41	NR
10	2	1	Federico Burdisso	Italy	51.45	
11	1	2	Jacob Peters	Great Britain	51.50	
11	1	6	James Guy	Great Britain	51.50	
13	2	7	Katsuhiro Matsumoto	Japan	51.57	
14	2	2	Piero Codia	Italy	51.73	
15	1	1	Gal Cohen Groumi	Israel	51.79	NR
16	1	8	Tomer Frankel	Israel	51.83	

=== Final ===
The Final was held on 24 June at 18:44.

Rank	Lane	Name	Nationality	Time	Notes
1st place, gold medalist(s)	4	Kristóf Milák	Hungary	50.14	
2nd place, silver medalist(s)	5	Naoki Mizunuma	Japan	50.94	
3rd place, bronze medalist(s)	3	Joshua Liendo	Canada	50.97	
4	8	Michael Andrew	United States	51.11	
5	1	Matthew Temple	Australia	51.15	
6	2	Simon Bucher	Austria	51.28	
7	7	Jakub Majerski	Poland	51.35	
8	6	Noè Ponti	Switzerland	51.51	
