= Greece at the 2022 World Aquatics Championships =

- Flag of Greece
- World Aquatics code: GRE
- National federation: Hellenic Swimming Federation

in Budapest, Hungary
- Competitors: 59 in 5 sports
- Medals Ranked 20th: Gold 0 Silver 0 Bronze 3 Total 3

World Aquatics Championships appearances
- 1973; 1975; 1978; 1982; 1986; 1991; 1994; 1998; 2001; 2003; 2005; 2007; 2009; 2011; 2013; 2015; 2017; 2019; 2022; 2023; 2024; 2025

Greece competed at the 2022 World Aquatics Championships in Budapest, Hungary from 18 June to 3 July.

== Medalists ==
Medal	Name	Sport	Event	Date
Bronze	Evangelia Platanioti	Artistic swimming	Solo technical routine	18 June
Bronze	Evangelia Platanioti	Artistic swimming	Solo free routine	22 June
Bronze	Greece men's national water polo team: Emmanouil Zerdevas; Konstantinos Genidounias; Dimitrios Skoumpakis; Efstathios Kalogeropoulos; Ioannis Fountoulis; Alexandros Papanastasiou; Georgios Dervisis; Stylianos Argyropoulos; Konstantinos Gouvis; Konstantinos Kakaris; Dimitrios Nikolaidis; Angelos Vlachopoulos; Panagiotis Tzortzatos	Water polo	Men's tournament	3 July

== Artistic swimming ==
Greece entered 12 artistic swimmers.

Women

Athlete	Event	Preliminaries		Final	
Athlete	Event	Points	Rank	Points	Rank
Evangelia Platanioti	Solo technical routine	88.6163	3 Q	89.5110	3rd place, bronze medalist(s)
Evangelia Platanioti	Solo free routine	90.4000	3 Q	91.7667	3rd place, bronze medalist(s)
Sofia Malkogeorgou; Evangelia Platanioti	Duet free routine	89.3667	6 Q	89.7000	6
Maria Alzigkouzi Kominea; Eleni Fragkaki; Krystalenia Gialama; Zoi Karangelou; Danai Kariori; Ifigeneia Krommydaki; Sofia Malkogeorgou; Andriana Misikevych	Team technical routine	86.2755	5 Q	87.2261	5
Maria Alzigkouzi Kominea; Eleni Fragkaki; Krystalenia Gialama; Zoi Karangelou; Danai Kariori; Ifigeneia Krommydaki; Sofia Malkogeorgou; Andriana Misikevych	Team free routine	88.4000	7 Q	88.1667	8
Zoi Agrafioti; Maria Alzigkouzi Kominea; Eleni Fragkaki; Krystalenia Gialama; Zoi Karangelou; Maria Karapanagiotou; Danai Kariori; Ifigeneia Krommydaki; Sofia Malkogeorgou; Andriana Misikevych	Free routine combination	86.9333	4 Q	88.2000	4
Zoi Agrafioti; Maria Alzigkouzi Kominea; Eleni Fragkaki; Krystalenia Gialama; Maria Karapanagiotou; Danai Kariori; Ifigeneia Krommydaki; Sofia Malkogeorgou; Andriana Misikevych; Lydia Papanastasiou	Highlight routine	87.6000	5 Q	87.2333	6

== Diving ==
Greece entered 2 divers.

Men

Athlete	Event	Preliminaries		Semifinals		Final	
Athlete	Event	Points	Rank	Points	Rank	Points	Rank
Theofilos Afthinos	1 m springboard	308.45	32	—N/a		did not advance	
Theofilos Afthinos	3 m springboard	312.20	39	did not advance			
Athanasios Tsirikos	1 m springboard	247.05	45	—N/a		did not advance	
Athanasios Tsirikos	3 m springboard	322.85	37	did not advance			
Athanasios Tsirikos	10 m platform	333.70	23	did not advance			

== Open water swimming ==
Greece entered 5 open water swimmers (3 male and 2 female)

Men

Athlete	Event	Time	Rank
Asterios Daldogiannis	10 km	did not finish	
Asterios Daldogiannis	25 km	5:09:26.3	15
Athanasios Kynigakis	5 km	54:32.8	12
Athanasios Kynigakis	10 km	did not start	
Dimitrios Markos	5 km	56:30.8	26

Mixed

Athlete	Event	Time	Rank
Dimitrios Markos; Ilektra Lebl; Afroditi Katsiara; Athanasios Kynigakis	Team	Disqualified	

== Swimming ==
Greece entered 15 swimmers.

Men

Athlete	Event	Heat		Semifinal		Final	
Athlete	Event	Time	Rank	Time	Rank	Time	Rank
Arkadios Aspougalis	50 m breaststroke	27.88	19	did not advance			
Stergios Bilas	50 m butterfly	23.72	28	did not advance			
Apostolos Christou	50 m backstroke	24.88	9 Q	24.39 NR	3 Q	24.57	5
Apostolos Christou	100 m backstroke	53.21	3 Q	52.09 CR, NR	1 Q	52.57	5
Kristian Gkolomeev	50 m freestyle	21.90	7 Q	21.80	5 Q	21.89	8
Evangelos Makrygiannis	200 m backstroke	1:59.25	14 Q	1:59.72	15	did not advance	
Dimitrios Markos	200 m freestyle	1:48.72	29	did not advance			
Dimitrios Markos	400 m freestyle	3:49.93	17	—N/a		did not advance	
Dimitrios Markos	800 m freestyle	8:00.08	16	—N/a		did not advance	
Odysseus Meladinis	100 m freestyle	49.50	33	did not advance			
Konstantinos Meretsolias	100 m breaststroke	1:01.46	25	did not advance			
Apostolos Papastamos	200 m individual medley	2:06.14	33	did not advance			
Apostolos Papastamos	400 m individual medley	4:26.06	24	—N/a		did not advance	
Konstantinos Stamou	100 m butterfly	52.77	24	did not advance			
Savvas Thomoglou	200 m breaststroke	2:14.20	26	did not advance			
Odysseus Meladinis; Stergios Bilas; Evangelos Makrygiannis; Dimitrios Markos	4 × 100 m freestyle relay	3:17.83	13	—N/a		did not advance	
Evangelos Makrygiannis; Konstantinos Meretsolias; Konstantinos Stamou; Dimitrios Markos	4 × 100 m medley relay	3:36.36	14	—N/a		did not advance	

Women

Athlete	Event	Heat		Semifinal		Final	
Athlete	Event	Time	Rank	Time	Rank	Time	Rank
Georgia Damasioti	200 m butterfly	2:13.12	19	did not advance			
Theodora Drakou	50 m freestyle	did not start		did not advance			
Theodora Drakou	50 m backstroke	28.12	12 Q	27.99	12	did not advance	
Theodora Drakou	100 m backstroke	1:01.59	20	did not advance			
Maria Drasidou	50 m breaststroke	31.83	26	did not advance			
Maria Drasidou	100 m breaststroke	1:11.00	35	did not advance			
Anna Ntountounaki	50 m butterfly	26.20	11 Q	25.89	10	did not advance	
Anna Ntountounaki	100 m butterfly	59.13	14 Q	57.93	9	did not advance	

Mixed

Athlete	Event	Heat		Final	
Athlete	Event	Time	Rank	Time	Rank
Stergios Bilas; Odysseus Meladinis; Maria Drasidou; Anna Ntountounaki	4 × 100 m freestyle relay	3:34.41	14	did not advance	
Evangelos Makrygiannis; Konstantinos Meretsolias; Anna Ntountounaki; Theodora Drakou	4 × 100 m medley relay	3:49.13	12	did not advance	

== Water polo ==
Summary

Team	Event	Group stage				Playoff	Quarterfinal	Semifinal	Final / BM	
Team	Event	Opposition Score	Opposition Score	Opposition Score	Rank	Opposition Score	Opposition Score	Opposition Score	Opposition Score	Rank
Greece	Men's tournament	Croatia; D 8–8	Japan; W 18–7	Germany; W 16–8	1 QF	—N/a	United States; W 16–11	Italy; L 10–11	Croatia; W 9–7	3rd place, bronze medalist(s)
Greece	Women's tournament	Thailand; W 28–1	Spain; D 10–10	France; W 14–4	1 QF	—N/a	Netherlands; L 7–12	Australia; L 14–16	France; W 16–7	7

=== Men's tournament ===
Team roster

The following is Greek roster in the Water polo at the 2022 World Aquatics Championships – Men's tournament.

Head coach: Thodoris Vlachos

- 1 Emmanouil Zerdevas GK
- 2 Konstantinos Genidounias FP
- 3 Dimitrios Skoumpakis FP
- 4 Efstathios Kalogeropoulos FP
- 5 Ioannis Fountoulis FP
- 6 Alexandros Papanastasiou FP
- 7 Georgios Dervisis FP
- 8 Stylianos Argyropoulos FP
- 9 Konstantinos Gouvis FP
- 10 Konstantinos Kakaris CF
- 11 Dimitrios Nikolaidis CF
- 12 Angelos Vlachopoulos FP
- 13 Panagiotis Tzortzatos GK

Group play

Pos	Team	Pld	W	D	L	GF	GA	GD	Pts	Qualification
1	Greece	3	2	1	0	42	23	+19	5 (Note: Greece 8–8 Croatia)	Quarterfinals
2	Croatia	3	2	1	0	42	30	+12	5	Playoffs
3	Japan	3	1	0	2	32	50	−18	2	Playoffs
4	Germany	3	0	0	3	28	41	−13	0	

Source: Sportresult
Rules for classification: 1) points; 2) head-to-head points; 3) head-to-head goal difference; 4) head-to-head number of goals scored; 5) Goal difference.
Notes:

21 June 2022; 19:30	Report	Greece	8–8	Croatia	Debrecen Swimming Pool Complex, Debrecen; Referees: Boris Margeta (SLO), David Gómez (ESP)
21 June 2022; 19:30	Report	Score by quarters: 4–1, 1–4, 2–1, 1–2			Debrecen Swimming Pool Complex, Debrecen; Referees: Boris Margeta (SLO), David Gómez (ESP)
21 June 2022; 19:30	Report	Vlachopoulos 4	Goals	Kharkov 3	Debrecen Swimming Pool Complex, Debrecen; Referees: Boris Margeta (SLO), David Gómez (ESP)

23 June 2022; 19:30	Report	Japan	7–18	Greece	Debrecen Swimming Pool Complex, Debrecen; Referees: Adil Aimbetov (KAZ), Michael Goldenberg (USA)
23 June 2022; 19:30	Report	Score by quarters: 1–3, 2–4, 2–5, 2–6			Debrecen Swimming Pool Complex, Debrecen; Referees: Adil Aimbetov (KAZ), Michael Goldenberg (USA)
23 June 2022; 19:30	Report	three players 2	Goals	Argyropoulos 6	Debrecen Swimming Pool Complex, Debrecen; Referees: Adil Aimbetov (KAZ), Michael Goldenberg (USA)

25 June 2022; 19:30	Report	Greece	16–8	Germany	Debrecen Swimming Pool Complex, Debrecen; Referees: Harvey Hinds (CUR), Ivan Raković (SRB)
25 June 2022; 19:30	Report	Score by quarters: 4–1, 5–1, 4–2, 3–4			Debrecen Swimming Pool Complex, Debrecen; Referees: Harvey Hinds (CUR), Ivan Raković (SRB)
25 June 2022; 19:30	Report	Genidounias 5	Goals	Božić 2	Debrecen Swimming Pool Complex, Debrecen; Referees: Harvey Hinds (CUR), Ivan Raković (SRB)

Quarterfinal

29 June 2022; 13:00	Report	Greece	16–11	United States	Alfréd Hajós National Swimming Stadium, Budapest; Referees: Michiel Zwart (NED), Frank Ohme (GER)
29 June 2022; 13:00	Report	Score by quarters: 3–1, 4–6, 3–0, 6–4			Alfréd Hajós National Swimming Stadium, Budapest; Referees: Michiel Zwart (NED), Frank Ohme (GER)
29 June 2022; 13:00	Report	Argyropoulos 5	Goals	three players 3	Alfréd Hajós National Swimming Stadium, Budapest; Referees: Michiel Zwart (NED), Frank Ohme (GER)

Semifinal

1 July 2022; 16:00	Report	Italy	11–10	Greece	Alfréd Hajós National Swimming Stadium, Budapest; Referees: Michael Goldenberg (USA), Michiel Zwart (NED)
1 July 2022; 16:00	Report	Score by quarters: 4–2, 2–3, 1–1, 4–4			Alfréd Hajós National Swimming Stadium, Budapest; Referees: Michael Goldenberg (USA), Michiel Zwart (NED)
1 July 2022; 16:00	Report	Dolce 3	Goals	Vlachopoulos 3	Alfréd Hajós National Swimming Stadium, Budapest; Referees: Michael Goldenberg (USA), Michiel Zwart (NED)

Third place game

3 July 2022; 14:30	Report	Greece	9–7	Croatia	Alfréd Hajós National Swimming Stadium, Budapest; Referees: Frank Ohme (GER), Michiel Zwart (NED)
3 July 2022; 14:30	Report	Score by quarters: 1–0, 4–3, 3–2, 1–2			Alfréd Hajós National Swimming Stadium, Budapest; Referees: Frank Ohme (GER), Michiel Zwart (NED)
3 July 2022; 14:30	Report	Kakaris 3	Goals	Bukić 2	Alfréd Hajós National Swimming Stadium, Budapest; Referees: Frank Ohme (GER), Michiel Zwart (NED)

=== Women's tournament ===
Team roster

The following is Greek roster in the Water polo at the 2022 World Aquatics Championships – Women's tournament.

Head coach: Alexia Kammenou

- 1 Ioanna Stamatopoulou GK
- 2 Eleftheria Plevritou FP
- 3 Ioanna Chydirioti FP
- 4 Eleni Elliniadi FP
- 5 Margarita Plevritou FP
- 6 Eleni Xenaki CF
- 7 Eirini Ninou FP
- 8 Maria Patra FP
- 9 Christina Siouti FP
- 10 Vasiliki Plevritou FP
- 11 Athina Dimitra Giannopoulou FP
- 12 Maria Myriokefalitaki CF
- 13 Eleni Sotireli GK

Group play

Pos	Team	Pld	W	D	L	GF	GA	GD	Pts	Qualification
1	Greece	3	2	1	0	53	15	+38	5 (Note: Spain 10–10 Greece)	Quarterfinals
2	Spain	3	2	1	0	58	20	+38	5	Playoffs
3	France	3	1	0	2	36	41	−5	2	Playoffs
4	Thailand	3	0	0	3	11	82	−71	0	

Source: Sportresult
Rules for classification: 1) points; 2) head-to-head points; 3) head-to-head goal difference; 4) head-to-head number of goals scored; 5) Goal difference.
Notes:

20 June 2022; 18:00	Report	Greece	28–1	Thailand	Szeged Tiszavirag Pool, Szeged; Referees: Helene Painchaud (CAN), Fabio Toffoli (BRA)
20 June 2022; 18:00	Report	Score by quarters: 7–0, 9–0, 5–0, 7–1			Szeged Tiszavirag Pool, Szeged; Referees: Helene Painchaud (CAN), Fabio Toffoli (BRA)
20 June 2022; 18:00	Report	Xenaki 5	Goals	Puangtong 1	Szeged Tiszavirag Pool, Szeged; Referees: Helene Painchaud (CAN), Fabio Toffoli (BRA)

22 June 2022; 18:00	Report	Spain	10–10	Greece	Szeged Tiszavirag Pool, Szeged; Referees: Levan Berishvili (GEO), Veselin Mišković (MNE)
22 June 2022; 18:00	Report	Score by quarters: 2–3, 4–3, 2–2, 2–2			Szeged Tiszavirag Pool, Szeged; Referees: Levan Berishvili (GEO), Veselin Mišković (MNE)
22 June 2022; 18:00	Report	Ruiz 4	Goals	E. Plevritou, V. Plevritou 3	Szeged Tiszavirag Pool, Szeged; Referees: Levan Berishvili (GEO), Veselin Mišković (MNE)

24 June 2022; 19:30	Report	France	4–15	Greece	Szeged Tiszavirag Pool, Szeged; Referees: Hélène Painchaud (CAN), Raffaele Colombo (ITA)
24 June 2022; 19:30	Report	Score by quarters: 1–4, 1–4, 1–3, 1–4			Szeged Tiszavirag Pool, Szeged; Referees: Hélène Painchaud (CAN), Raffaele Colombo (ITA)
24 June 2022; 19:30	Report	Bouloukbachi 2	Goals	three players 3	Szeged Tiszavirag Pool, Szeged; Referees: Hélène Painchaud (CAN), Raffaele Colombo (ITA)

Quarterfinals

28 June 2022; 19:30	Report	Greece	7–12	Netherlands	Alfréd Hajós National Swimming Stadium, Budapest; Referees: David Gómez (ESP), Boris Margeta (SLO)
28 June 2022; 19:30	Report	Score by quarters: 1–3, 2–3, 3–3, 1–3			Alfréd Hajós National Swimming Stadium, Budapest; Referees: David Gómez (ESP), Boris Margeta (SLO)
28 June 2022; 19:30	Report	Patra, E. Plevritou 2	Goals	Moolhuijzen 4	Alfréd Hajós National Swimming Stadium, Budapest; Referees: David Gómez (ESP), Boris Margeta (SLO)

5th–8tth place semifinal

30 June 2022; 19:30	Report	Australia	16–14 (PSO)	Greece	Alfréd Hajós National Swimming Stadium, Budapest; Referees: Raffaele Colombo (ITA), György Kun (HUN)
30 June 2022; 19:30	Report	Score by quarters: 2–2, 4–2, 4–4, 2–4 PSO: 4–2			Alfréd Hajós National Swimming Stadium, Budapest; Referees: Raffaele Colombo (ITA), György Kun (HUN)
30 June 2022; 19:30	Report	Leeson-Smith, Ridge 3	Goals	Xenaki 4	Alfréd Hajós National Swimming Stadium, Budapest; Referees: Raffaele Colombo (ITA), György Kun (HUN)

Seventh place game

2 July 2022; 13:00	Report	France	7–16	Greece	Alfréd Hajós National Swimming Stadium, Budapest; Referees: Veselin Mišković (MNE), Dion Willis (RSA)
2 July 2022; 13:00	Report	Score by quarters: 2–5, 1–3, 2–5, 2–3			Alfréd Hajós National Swimming Stadium, Budapest; Referees: Veselin Mišković (MNE), Dion Willis (RSA)
2 July 2022; 13:00	Report	Millot 3	Goals	Myriokefalitaki 5	Alfréd Hajós National Swimming Stadium, Budapest; Referees: Veselin Mišković (MNE), Dion Willis (RSA)
