= Swimming at the 2022 World Aquatics Championships – Men's 200 metre individual medley =

Men's 200 metre individual medley at the 2022 World Aquatics Championships
- Venue: Danube Arena
- Location: Budapest, Hungary
- Dates: 21 June (heats and semifinals); 22 June (final)
- Competitors: 45 from 38 nations
- Winning time: 1:55.22

Medalists
gold medal	Léon Marchand	France
silver medal	Carson Foster	United States
bronze medal	Daiya Seto	Japan

The Men's 200 metre individual medley competition at the 2022 World Aquatics Championships was held on 21 and 22 June 2022.

== Records ==
Prior to the competition, the existing world and championship records were as follows.

World record	Ryan Lochte (USA)	1:54.00	Shanghai, China	28 July 2011
Competition record	Ryan Lochte (USA)	1:54.00	Shanghai, China	28 July 2011

== Results ==
=== Heats ===
The heats were started on 21 June at 09:40.

Rank	Heat	Lane	Name	Nationality	Time	Notes
1	3	5	Carson Foster	United States	1:57.94	Q
2	3	4	Chase Kalisz	United States	1:58.25	Q
3	4	4	Jérémy Desplanches	Switzerland	1:58.29	Q
3	5	5	Daiya Seto	Japan	1:58.29	Q
5	3	7	Ron Polonsky	Israel	1:58.31	Q
6	4	3	Hubert Kós	Hungary	1:58.47	Q
7	5	2	Matthew Sates	South Africa	1:58.61	Q
8	3	3	Alberto Razzetti	Italy	1:58.70	Q
8	5	3	Léon Marchand	France	1:58.70	Q
10	4	6	Lewis Clareburt	New Zealand	1:58.76	Q
11	4	1	Gal Cohen Groumi	Israel	1:59.34	Q
12	3	1	Se-Bom Lee	Australia	1:59.37	Q
13	5	1	Dominik Török	Hungary	1:59.41	Q
14	5	6	Tom Dean	Great Britain	1:59.44	Q
15	5	4	Wang Shun	China	1:59.51	Q
16	4	5	Hugo González	Spain	1:59.53	Q
17	3	6	Finlay Knox	Canada	1:59.60	
18	5	7	Qin Haiyang	China	1:59.68	
19	3	8	Enzo Tesic	France	1:59.71	
20	3	0	Kim Min-suk	South Korea	2:00.88	
21	3	9	Kaloyan Bratanov	Bulgaria	2:01.22	
22	3	2	Brendon Smith	Australia	2:01.32	
23	4	7	Vinicius Lanza	Brazil	2:01.84	
24	5	9	Vadym Naumenko	Ukraine	2:02.00	
25	4	8	Wang Hsing-hao	Chinese Taipei	2:02.27	
26	2	3	Maximillian Ang	Singapore	2:02.94	
27	4	9	Trần Hưng Nguyên	Vietnam	2:03.62	
28	2	4	Patrick Groters	Aruba	2:04.58	
29	2	7	Munzer Kabbara	Lebanon	2:04.66	
30	2	1	Matheo Mateos	Paraguay	2:04.73	
31	2	8	František Jablčník	Slovakia	2:05.06	
32	2	9	Santiago Corredor	Colombia	2:05.87	
33	4	0	Apostolos Papastamos	Greece	2:06.14	
34	2	6	Tyler Christianson	Panama	2:06.47	
35	2	0	Aflah Fadlan Prawira	Indonesia	2:07.23	
36	2	5	Keanan Dols	Jamaica	2:08.24	
37	1	5	Brandon Schuster	Samoa	2:08.95	
38	1	3	Simon Bachmann	Seychelles	2:09.75	
39	1	1	Omar Abouelela	Qatar	2:11.07	
40	2	2	Dulyawat Kaewsriyong	Thailand	2:13.78	
41	1	2	Adnan Al-Abdallat	Jordan	2:14.31	
42	1	7	Nasir Hussain	Nepal	2:20.43	
43	1	6	Kinley Lhendup	Bhutan	2:29.72	
	1	4	Esteban Núñez del Prado	Bolivia	Disqualified	
	4	2	Caio Pumputis	Brazil	Disqualified	
	5	0	José Martínez Gómez	Mexico	Did not start	
	5	8	Bernhard Reitshammer	Austria	Did not start	

=== Semifinals ===
The semifinals were started on 21 June at 19:39.

Rank	Heat	Lane	Name	Nationality	Time	Notes
1	2	2	Léon Marchand	France	1:55.75	Q, NR
2	2	4	Carson Foster	United States	1:56.44	Q
3	1	5	Daiya Seto	Japan	1:56.74	Q
4	1	4	Chase Kalisz	United States	1:56.76	Q
5	1	3	Hubert Kós	Hungary	1:57.23	Q
6	1	1	Tom Dean	Great Britain	1:57.38	Q
7	1	2	Lewis Clareburt	New Zealand	1:57.63	Q
8	2	6	Matthew Sates	South Africa	1:57.74	Q
9	2	3	Ron Polonsky	Israel	1:57.99	NR
10	1	6	Alberto Razzetti	Italy	1:58.02	
11	2	5	Jérémy Desplanches	Switzerland	1:58.31	
12	1	8	Hugo González	Spain	1:58.41	
13	2	7	Gal Cohen Groumi	Israel	1:59.67	
14	1	7	Se-Bom Lee	Australia	2:00.11	
15	2	1	Dominik Török	Hungary	2:00.71	
16	2	8	Wang Shun	China	2:01.35	

=== Final ===
The final was held on 22 June at 19:06.

Rank	Lane	Name	Nationality	Time	Notes
1st place, gold medalist(s)	4	Léon Marchand	France	1:55.22	NR
2nd place, silver medalist(s)	5	Carson Foster	United States	1:55.71	
3rd place, bronze medalist(s)	3	Daiya Seto	Japan	1:56.22	
4	6	Chase Kalisz	United States	1:56.43	
5	7	Tom Dean	Great Britain	1:56.77	
6	2	Hubert Kós	Hungary	1:57.26	
7	1	Lewis Clareburt	New Zealand	1:58.11	
8	8	Matthew Sates	South Africa	1:58.27	
