= Colombia at the 2022 World Aquatics Championships =

- Flag of Colombia
- World Aquatics code: COL
- National federation: Federación Colombiana de Natación
- Website: fecna.com.co

in Budapest, Hungary
- Competitors: 31 in 5 sports
- Medals: Gold 0 Silver 0 Bronze 0 Total 0

World Aquatics Championships appearances
- 1973; 1975; 1978; 1982; 1986; 1991; 1994; 1998; 2001; 2003; 2005; 2007; 2009; 2011; 2013; 2015; 2017; 2019; 2022; 2023; 2024; 2025

Colombia competed at the 2022 World Aquatics Championships in Budapest, Hungary from 18 June to 3 July.

== Artistic swimming ==
Colombia entered 4 artistic swimmers.

Women

Athlete	Event	Preliminaries		Final	
Athlete	Event	Points	Rank	Points	Rank
Melisa Ceballos; Estefanía Roa	Duet technical routine	74.3560	21	did not advance	
Melisa Ceballos; Estefanía Roa	Duet free routine	75.5333	22	did not advance	

Mixed

Athlete	Event	Preliminaries		Final	
Athlete	Event	Points	Rank	Points	Rank
Jennifer Cerquera; Gustavo Sánchez	Duet technical routine	78.5003	6	81.2272	6
Jennifer Cerquera; Gustavo Sánchez	Duet free routine	81.4667	6	83.0667	6

== Diving ==
Colombia entered 8 divers.

Men

Athlete	Event	Preliminaries		Semifinals		Final	
Athlete	Event	Points	Rank	Points	Rank	Points	Rank
Alejandro Arias	1 m springboard	296.10	34	—N/a		did not advance	
Leonardo García	10 m platform	336.60	22	did not advance			
Sebastián Morales	1 m springboard	358.10	23	—N/a		374.90	5
Sebastián Morales	3 m springboard	389.30	10	315.30	18	did not advance	
Luis Uribe	3 m springboard	402.55	4	411.70	4	457.15	4
Sebastián Morales; Luis Uribe	Synchronized 3 m springboard	386.37	4	—N/a		364.62	7

Women

Athlete	Event	Preliminaries		Semifinals		Final	
Athlete	Event	Points	Rank	Points	Rank	Points	Rank
Mariana Osorio	10 m platform	158.05	33	did not advance			
Diana Pineda	1 m springboard	226.25	21	—N/a		did not advance	
Viviana Uribe	3 m springboard	238.70	24	did not advance			
Viviana Uribe	10 m platform	259.15	20	did not advance			
Daniela Zapata	1 m springboard	222.50	22	—N/a		did not advance	
Daniela Zapata	3 m springboard	230.60	28	did not advance			
Diana Pineda; Daniela Zapata	Synchronized 3 m springboard	249.84	8	—N/a		229.80	11

Mixed

Athlete	Event	Preliminaries		Final	
Athlete	Event	Points	Rank	Points	Rank
Leonardo García; Viviana Uribe	Team event	—N/a		270.85	11

== Open water swimming ==
Colombia entered 1 open water swimmer

Men

Athlete	Event	Time	Rank
Juan Morales	5 km	56:21.2	14

== Swimming ==
Colombia entered 6 swimmers.

Men

Athlete	Event	Heat		Semifinal		Final	
Athlete	Event	Time	Rank	Time	Rank	Time	Rank
Santiago Corredor	200 m freestyle	1:50.44	38	did not advance			
Santiago Corredor	200 m individual medley	2:05.87	32	did not advance			
Juan Morales	400 m freestyle	3:51.50	22	—N/a		did not advance	
Juan Morales	800 m freestyle	8:05.61	20	—N/a		did not advance	
Omar Pinzón	100 m backstroke	55.95	31	did not advance			
Omar Pinzón	200 m backstroke	2:00.62	19	did not advance			

Women

Athlete	Event	Heat		Semifinal		Final	
Athlete	Event	Time	Rank	Time	Rank	Time	Rank
Karen Durango	200 m freestyle	2:01.61	24	did not advance			
Karen Durango	200 m butterfly	2:14.20	20	did not advance			
Jimena Leguizamón	100 m backstroke	1:03.16	26	did not advance			
Jimena Leguizamón	200 m backstroke	2:16.38	16	2:15.11	16	did not advance	
Karina Vivas	50 m breaststroke	32.07	30	did not advance			
Karina Vivas	100 m breaststroke	1:10.60	33	did not advance			

== Water polo ==
Summary

Team	Event	Group stage				Playoff	Quarterfinal	Semifinal	Final / BM	
Team	Event	Opposition Score	Opposition Score	Opposition Score	Rank	Opposition Score	Opposition Score	Opposition Score	Opposition Score	Rank
Colombia	Women's tournament	Hungary; L 4–35	Canada; L 2–22	Italy; L 5–31	4	—N/a	—N/a	South Africa; L 11–14	Thailand; L 6–10	16

=== Women's tournament ===
Team roster

The following is Colombian roster in the Water polo at the 2022 World Aquatics Championships – Women's tournament.

Head coach: Bladimir Lopez Molina

- 1 Sara Agudelo GK
- 2 Angela Rivera CF
- 3 Valentina Restrepo CF
- 4 Carolina Ortega Fuentes FP
- 5 Antonia Caicedo Granada CF
- 6 Juliana Atehortua Gil FP
- 7 Daniela Marin Correa FP
- 8 Carolina Lastre Palomeque FP
- 9 Maria Jose Serna Quiroz FP
- 10 Sara Vanegas Morales FP
- 11 Susana Atehortua Gil FP
- 12 Ana Maria Correa Vanegas FP
- 13 Isabella Chamorro Vergara GK

Group play

Pos	Team	Pld	W	D	L	GF	GA	GD	Pts	Qualification
1	Italy	3	2	1	0	48	21	+27	5	Quarterfinals
2	Hungary (H)	3	2	0	1	55	21	+34	4	Playoffs
3	Canada	3	1	1	1	36	20	+16	3	Playoffs
4	Colombia	3	0	0	3	11	88	−77	0	

Source: Sportresult
Rules for classification: 1) points; 2) head-to-head points; 3) head-to-head goal difference; 4) head-to-head number of goals scored; 5) Goal difference.
(H) Hosts

20 June 2022; 21:00	Report	Hungary	35–4	Colombia	Alfréd Hajós National Swimming Stadium, Budapest; Referees: Pascal Bouchez (FRA), Maro Savinović (CRO)
20 June 2022; 21:00	Report	Score by quarters: 8–2, 12–0, 7–0, 8–2			Alfréd Hajós National Swimming Stadium, Budapest; Referees: Pascal Bouchez (FRA), Maro Savinović (CRO)
20 June 2022; 21:00	Report	Rybanská 6	Goals	Vanegas 2	Alfréd Hajós National Swimming Stadium, Budapest; Referees: Pascal Bouchez (FRA), Maro Savinović (CRO)

22 June 2022; 19:30	Report	Colombia	2–22	Canada	Alfréd Hajós National Swimming Stadium, Budapest; Referees: Anbar Anbar (KUW), Dion Willis (RSA)
22 June 2022; 19:30	Report	Score by quarters: 1–3, 1–5, 0–7, 0–7			Alfréd Hajós National Swimming Stadium, Budapest; Referees: Anbar Anbar (KUW), Dion Willis (RSA)
22 June 2022; 19:30	Report	Ortega, Restrepo 1	Goals	McKelvey 5	Alfréd Hajós National Swimming Stadium, Budapest; Referees: Anbar Anbar (KUW), Dion Willis (RSA)

24 June 2022; 19:30	Report	Italy	31–5	Colombia	Alfréd Hajós National Swimming Stadium, Budapest; Referees: Anbar Anbar (KUW), Dion Willis (RSA)
24 June 2022; 19:30	Report	Score by quarters: 5–2, 7–0, 6–2, 13–1			Alfréd Hajós National Swimming Stadium, Budapest; Referees: Anbar Anbar (KUW), Dion Willis (RSA)
24 June 2022; 19:30	Report	Avegno 6	Goals	Restrepo 2	Alfréd Hajós National Swimming Stadium, Budapest; Referees: Anbar Anbar (KUW), Dion Willis (RSA)

13–16th place semifinals

26 June 2022; 17:00	Report	Colombia	11–14	South Africa	Szeged Tiszavirag Pool, Szeged; Referees: Asumi Tsuzaki (JPN), Pascal Bouchez (FRA)
26 June 2022; 17:00	Report	Score by quarters: 3–4, 3–5, 3–3, 2–2			Szeged Tiszavirag Pool, Szeged; Referees: Asumi Tsuzaki (JPN), Pascal Bouchez (FRA)
26 June 2022; 17:00	Report	Marín, Vanegas 3	Goals	MacLeod 4	Szeged Tiszavirag Pool, Szeged; Referees: Asumi Tsuzaki (JPN), Pascal Bouchez (FRA)

15th place game

28 June 2022; 14:00	Report	Colombia	6–10	Thailand	Szeged Tiszavirag Pool, Szeged; Referees: Asumi Tsuzaki (JPN), Agustin Pinski (ARG)
28 June 2022; 14:00	Report	Score by quarters: 2–2, 2–1, 2–2, 0–5			Szeged Tiszavirag Pool, Szeged; Referees: Asumi Tsuzaki (JPN), Agustin Pinski (ARG)
28 June 2022; 14:00	Report	Restrepo 5	Goals	Puengpongsakul 3	Szeged Tiszavirag Pool, Szeged; Referees: Asumi Tsuzaki (JPN), Agustin Pinski (ARG)
