= Mexico at the 2022 World Aquatics Championships =

- Flag of Mexico
- FINA code: MEX
- National federation: Mexican Swimming Federation

in Budapest, Hungary
- Competitors: 36 in 4 sports
- Medals: Gold 0 Silver 0 Bronze 0 Total 0

World Aquatics Championships appearances
- 1973; 1975; 1978; 1982; 1986; 1991; 1994; 1998; 2001; 2003; 2005; 2007; 2009; 2011; 2013; 2015; 2017; 2019; 2022; 2023; 2024

Mexico competed at the 2022 World Aquatics Championships in Budapest, Hungary from 18 June to 3 July.

== Artistic swimming ==
Mexico entered 14 artistic swimmers.

Women

Athlete	Event	Preliminaries		Final	
Athlete	Event	Points	Rank	Points	Rank
Joana Jiménez	Solo technical routine	83.1988	9 Q	83.8394	8
Nuria Diosdado; Joana Jiménez	Duet technical routine	85.6160	6 Q	87.1936	6
Nuria Diosdado; Joana Jiménez	Duet free routine	87.5333	7 Q	88.0333	7
Regina Alférez; Marla Arellano; Nuria Diosdado; Glenda Inzunza; Joana Jiménez; Luisa Rodríguez; Jessica Sobrino; Pamela Toscano	Team free routine	87.5333	9 Q	88.9667	7
Regina Alférez; Marla Arellano; Miranda Barrera; Daniela Estrada; Itzamary Gonzalez; Glenda Inzunza; Ana Martínez; Luisa Rodríguez; Jessica Sobrino; Pamela Toscano	Highlight routine	88.5333	4 Q	89.3667	4

Mixed

Athlete	Event	Preliminaries		Final	
Athlete	Event	Points	Rank	Points	Rank
Joel Benavides; Trinidad Meza	Duet technical routine	76.4581	8 Q	77.5890	8

== Diving ==
Mexico entered 10 divers.

Men

Athlete	Event	Preliminaries		Semifinals		Final	
Athlete	Event	Points	Rank	Points	Rank	Points	Rank
Tonantzin Fernández	10 m platform	288.45	34	did not advance			
Yolotl Martínez	1 m springboard	315.85	27	—		did not advance	
Yolotl Martínez	3 m springboard	350.15	27	did not advance			
Kevin Muñoz	1 m springboard	341.40	17	—		did not advance	
Kevin Muñoz	3 m springboard	265.95	49	did not advance			
Diego García; Yolotl Martínez	Synchronized 3 m springboard	358.26	7 Q	—		363.21	8

Women

Athlete	Event	Preliminaries		Semifinals		Final	
Athlete	Event	Points	Rank	Points	Rank	Points	Rank
Arantxa Chávez	1 m springboard	231.60	19	—		did not advance	
Arantxa Chávez	3 m springboard	282.60	10 Q	255.35	17	did not advance	
Viviana Del Ángel	10 m platform	295.15	8 Q	227.25	17	did not advance	
Gabriela Gutiérrez	3 m springboard	217.20	31	did not advance			
Samantha Jiménez	10 m platform	177.65	30	did not advance			
Natalia Mayorga	1 m springboard	195.55	36	—		did not advance	
Arantxa Chávez; Abril Navarro	Synchronized 3 m springboard	237.96	11 Q	—		266.16	8
Viviana Del Ángel; Samantha Jiménez	Synchronized 10 m platform	271.62	5 Q	—		269.10	8

Mixed

Athlete	Event	Preliminaries		Final	
Athlete	Event	Points	Rank	Points	Rank
Viviana Del Ángel; Kevin Muñoz	Team event	—		289.35	10
Kevin Muñoz; Arantxa Chávez	Synchronized 3 m springboard	—		282.42	4

== Open water swimming ==
Mexico entered 6 open water swimmers (3 male and 3 female)

Men

Athlete	Event	Time	Rank
Daniel Delgadillo	10 km	1:59:28.0	30
Daniel Delgadillo	25 km	did not start	
Arturo Pérez Vertti	5 km	59:43.5	40
Paulo Strehlke	5 km	did not start	
Paulo Strehlke	10 km	2:04:04.3	47

Women

Athlete	Event	Time	Rank
Paulina Alanis	10 km	2:10:43.0	41
Citlalli Mora	5 km	1:05:22.8	41
Martha Sandoval	5 km	1:03:13.5	34
Martha Sandoval	10 km	2:06:54.4	29

Mixed

Athlete	Event	Time	Rank
Martha Sandoval; Paulo Strehlke; Paulina Alanís; Arturo Pérez Vertti	Team	1:09:02.4	13

== Swimming ==
Mexico entered 6 swimmers.

Men

Athlete	Event	Heat		Semifinal		Final	
Athlete	Event	Time	Rank	Time	Rank	Time	Rank
Gabriel Castaño	50 m freestyle	22.64	37	did not advance			
Jorge Iga	100 m freestyle	49.70	36	did not advance			
Jorge Iga	200 m freestyle	1:48.96	31	did not advance			
Jorge Iga	50 m butterfly	24.13	38	did not advance			
José Ángel Martínez	100 m butterfly	53.22	34	did not advance			
José Ángel Martínez	200 m individual medley	did not start		did not advance			
Héctor Ruvalcaba	200 m butterfly	1:56.96	17	did not advance			
Héctor Ruvalcaba	400 m individual medley	4:19.99	18	—		did not advance	

Women

Athlete	Event	Heat		Semifinal		Final	
Athlete	Event	Time	Rank	Time	Rank	Time	Rank
María José Mata	100 m butterfly	59.58	17	did not advance			
María José Mata	200 m butterfly	2:09.32 NR	9 Q	2:09.78	11	did not advance	
Melissa Rodríguez	50 m breaststroke	31.71	24	did not advance			
Melissa Rodríguez	100 m breaststroke	1:08.95	25	did not advance			
Melissa Rodríguez	200 m breaststroke	2:28.19	18	did not advance			
Melissa Rodríguez	200 m individual medley	2:19.55	31	did not advance			
