= Germany at the 2022 World Aquatics Championships =

- Flag of Germany
- World Aquatics code: GER
- National federation: Deutscher Schwimmverband
- Website: www.dsv.de

in Budapest, Hungary
- Competitors: 45 in 5 sports
- Medals Ranked 9th: Gold 2 Silver 5 Bronze 3 Total 10

World Aquatics Championships appearances
- 1991; 1994; 1998; 2001; 2003; 2005; 2007; 2009; 2011; 2013; 2015; 2017; 2019; 2022; 2023; 2024; 2025

Other related appearances
- East Germany (1973–1986); West Germany (1973–1986)

Germany competed at the 2022 World Aquatics Championships in Budapest, Hungary from 18 June to 3 July.

== Medalists ==
Medal	Name	Sport	Event	Date
Gold	Leonie Beck; Lea Boy; Oliver Klemet; Florian Wellbrock	Open water swimming	Team	26 June
Gold	Florian Wellbrock	Open water swimming	Men's 5 km	27 June
Silver	Lukas Märtens	Swimming	Men's 400 metre freestyle	18 June
Silver	Anna Elendt	Swimming	Women's 100 metre breaststroke	20 June
Silver	Florian Wellbrock	Swimming	Men's 800 metre freestyle	21 June
Silver	Leonie Beck	Open water swimming	Women's 10 km	29 June
Silver	Lea Boy	Open water swimming	Women's 25 km	30 June
Bronze	Florian Wellbrock	Swimming	Men's 1500 metre freestyle	25 June
Bronze	Timo Barthel; Lars Rüdiger	Diving	Men's synchronized 3 metre springboard	26 June
Bronze	Florian Wellbrock	Open water swimming	Men's 10 km	29 June

== Artistic swimming ==
Women

Athlete	Event	Preliminaries		Final	
Athlete	Event	Points	Rank	Points	Rank
Marlene Bojer	Solo technical routine	80.8648	11 Q	81.4450	11
Marlene Bojer	Solo free routine	82.8667	10 Q	84.2000	10
Marlene Bojer; Michelle Zimmer	Duet technical routine	82.7121	11 Q	82.7570	11
Marlene Bojer; Michelle Zimmer	Duet free routine	82.8000	12 Q	82.9333	12

== Diving ==
Men

Athlete	Event	Preliminaries		Semifinals		Final	
Athlete	Event	Points	Rank	Points	Rank	Points	Rank
Timo Barthel	1 m springboard	329.15	20	—N/a		did not advance	
Timo Barthel	10 m platform	365.30	17 Q	366.20	14	did not advance	
Jaden Eikermann	10 m platform	325.20	27	did not advance			
Lou Massenberg	3 m springboard	353.80	25	did not advance			
Lars Rüdiger	1 m springboard	327.85	21	—N/a		did not advance	
Moritz Wesemann	3 m springboard	390.35	9 Q	408.15	5 Q	WD	
Timo Barthel; Lars Rüdiger	3 m synchronized springboard	383.07	5 Q	—N/a		406.44	3rd place, bronze medalist(s)
Timo Barthel; Jaden Eikermann	10 m synchronized platform	340.47	8 Q	—N/a		377.37	5

Women

Athlete	Event	Preliminaries		Semifinals		Final	
Athlete	Event	Points	Rank	Points	Rank	Points	Rank
Lena Hentschel	3 m springboard	276.60	12 Q	297.60	5 Q	262.55	12
Jette Müller	1 m springboard	249.45	10 Q	—N/a		256.15	7
Saskia Oettinghaus	1 m springboard	236.55	17	—N/a		did not advance	
Pauline Pfeif	10 m platform	282.00	12 Q	260.10	16	did not advance	
Tina Punzel	3 m springboard	294.30	7 Q	285.00	8 Q	315.60	4
Christina Wassen	10 m platform	272.05	16 Q	303.55	8 Q	253.80	12
Lena Hentschel; Tina Punzel	3 m synchronized springboard	282.87	3 Q	—N/a		282.99	4
Christina Wassen; Elena Wassen	10 m synchronized platform	281.88	3	—N/a		284.16	5

Mixed

Athlete	Event	Final	
Athlete	Event	Points	Rank
Tina Punzel; Lou Massenberg	3 m synchronized springboard	277.62	5
Elena Wassen; Lou Massenberg	10 m synchronized platform	286.38	4
Timo Barthel; Elena Wassen	Team	354.35	4

== Open water swimming ==
Men

Athlete	Event	Time	Rank
Niklas Frach	Men's 5 km	55:25.5	13
Niklas Frach	Men's 10 km	1:51:45.8	7
Ben Langner	Men's 25 km	5:06:19.1	13
Andreas Waschburger	Men's 25 km	5:04:47.8	11
Florian Wellbrock	Men's 5 km	52:48.8	1st place, gold medalist(s)
Florian Wellbrock	Men's 10 km	1:51:11.2	3rd place, bronze medalist(s)

Women

Athlete	Event	Time	Rank
Leonie Beck	Women's 5 km	57:56.2	4
Leonie Beck	Women's 10 km	2:02:29.7	2nd place, silver medalist(s)
Lea Boy	Women's 10 km	2:02:40.5	8
Lea Boy	Women's 25 km	5:24:15.2	2nd place, silver medalist(s)
Elea Linka	Women's 25 km	5:25:36.7	6
Jeannette Spiwoks	Women's 5 km	58:06.2	9

Mixed

Athlete	Event	Time	Rank
Leonie Beck; Lea Boy; Oliver Klemet; Florian Wellbrock	Team	1:04:40.5	1st place, gold medalist(s)

== Swimming ==
Men

Athlete	Event	Heat		Semifinal		Final	
Athlete	Event	Time	Rank	Time	Rank	Time	Rank
Ole Braunschweig	50 m backstroke	24.58 NR	2 Q	24.61	8 Q	24.66	6
Ole Braunschweig	100 m backstroke	54.22	16 Q	54.18	16	did not advance	
Jan Eric Friese	100 m butterfly	52.39	19	did not advance			
Lukas Märtens	200 m freestyle	1:46.45	7 Q	1:45.94	7 Q	1:45.73	7
Lukas Märtens	400 m freestyle	3:45.04	4 Q	—N/a		3:42.85	2nd place, silver medalist(s)
Lukas Märtens	800 m freestyle	7:55.21	15	—N/a		did not advance	
Lukas Märtens	1500 m freestyle	14:53.59	6 Q	—N/a		14:40.89	4
Lucas Matzerath	50 m breaststroke	27.01	5 Q	26.99	4 Q	27.10	6
Lucas Matzerath	100 m breaststroke	59.94	9 Q	59.35	6 Q	59.50	6
Rafael Miroslaw	100 m freestyle	48.65	19	did not advance			
Rafael Miroslaw	200 m freestyle	1:48.28	26	did not advance			
Henning Mühlleitner	400 m freestyle	3:47.17	11	—N/a		did not advance	
Florian Wellbrock	800 m freestyle	7:44.80	2 Q	—N/a		7:39.63 NR	2nd place, silver medalist(s)
Florian Wellbrock	1500 m freestyle	14:50.12	1 Q	—N/a		14:36.94	3rd place, bronze medalist(s)
Ole Braunschweig; Lucas Matzerath; Jan Eric Friese; Rafael Miroslaw	4 × 100 m medley relay	3:33.98	7 Q	—N/a		3:32.63	6

Women

Athlete	Event	Heat		Semifinal		Final	
Athlete	Event	Time	Rank	Time	Rank	Time	Rank
Anna Elendt	50 m breaststroke	30.12	4 Q	30.30	7 Q	30.22	5
Anna Elendt	100 m breaststroke	1:06.54	5 Q	1:05.62	1 Q	1:05.98	2nd place, silver medalist(s)
Anna Elendt	200 m breaststroke	2:30.08	23	did not advance			
Isabel Gose	200 m freestyle	1:57.94	9 Q	1:56.82	7 Q	1:57.38	8
Isabel Gose	400 m freestyle	4:06.44	8 Q	—N/a		4:03.47	5
Isabel Gose	800 m freestyle	8:27.69	5 Q	—N/a		8:23.78	6
Angelina Köhler	100 m butterfly	58.44	11 Q	58.46	14	did not advance	

Mixed

Athlete	Event	Heat		Final	
Athlete	Event	Time	Rank	Time	Rank
Ole Braunschweig; Anna Elendt; Jan Eric Friese (*); Angelina Köhler; Rafael Miroslaw	4 × 100 metre medley relay	3:46.54	8 Q	3:46.64	8

Legend: (*) = Swimmers who participated in the heat only.

== Water polo ==
Summary

Team	Event	Group stage				Playoff	Quarterfinal	Semifinal	Final / BM	
Team	Event	Opposition Score	Opposition Score	Opposition Score	Rank	Opposition Score	Opposition Score	Opposition Score	Opposition Score	Rank
Germany	Men's tournament	Japan; L 11–12	Croatia; L 9–13	Greece; L 8–16	4	—N/a	—N/a	Brazil; W 10–9	Kazakhstan; W 16–7	13

=== Men's tournament ===
Team roster

The following is German roster in the Water polo at the 2022 World Aquatics Championships – Men's tournament.

Head coach: (Montenegro) Petar Porobić

- 1 Moritz Schenkel GK
- 2 Zoran Božić CB
- 3 Ferdinand Korbel CF
- 4 Jan Rotermund CB
- 5 Fynn Schütze FP
- 6 Maurice Jüngling CB
- 7 Dennis Strelezkij D
- 8 Lukas Küppers FP
- 9 Philipp Dolff CB
- 10 Phillip Kubisch FP
- 11 Niclas Schipper CF
- 12 Mark Gansen D
- 13 Kevin Götz GK

Group play

Pos	Team	Pld	W	D	L	GF	GA	GD	Pts	Qualification
1	Greece	3	2	1	0	42	23	+19	5 (Note: Greece 8–8 Croatia)	Quarterfinals
2	Croatia	3	2	1	0	42	30	+12	5	Playoffs
3	Japan	3	1	0	2	32	50	−18	2	Playoffs
4	Germany	3	0	0	3	28	41	−13	0	

Source: Sportresult
Rules for classification: 1) points; 2) head-to-head points; 3) head-to-head goal difference; 4) head-to-head number of goals scored; 5) Goal difference.
Notes:

21 June 2022; 18:00	Report	Germany	11–12	Japan	Debrecen Swimming Pool Complex, Debrecen; Referees: Ivan Raković (SRB), Adil Aimbetov (KAZ)
21 June 2022; 18:00	Report	Score by quarters: 2–5, 2–3, 2–3, 5–1			Debrecen Swimming Pool Complex, Debrecen; Referees: Ivan Raković (SRB), Adil Aimbetov (KAZ)
21 June 2022; 18:00	Report	Schütze 3	Goals	Inaba 5	Debrecen Swimming Pool Complex, Debrecen; Referees: Ivan Raković (SRB), Adil Aimbetov (KAZ)

23 June 2022; 18:00	Report	Croatia	13–9	Germany	Debrecen Swimming Pool Complex, Debrecen; Referees: Michiel Zwart (NED), Ivan Raković (SRB)
23 June 2022; 18:00	Report	Score by quarters: 4–1, 4–1, 2–2, 3–5			Debrecen Swimming Pool Complex, Debrecen; Referees: Michiel Zwart (NED), Ivan Raković (SRB)
23 June 2022; 18:00	Report	Bašić, Krapić 3	Goals	Küppers 3	Debrecen Swimming Pool Complex, Debrecen; Referees: Michiel Zwart (NED), Ivan Raković (SRB)

25 June 2022; 19:30	Report	Greece	16–8	Germany	Debrecen Swimming Pool Complex, Debrecen; Referees: Harvey Hinds (CUR), Ivan Raković (SRB)
25 June 2022; 19:30	Report	Score by quarters: 4–1, 5–1, 4–2, 3–4			Debrecen Swimming Pool Complex, Debrecen; Referees: Harvey Hinds (CUR), Ivan Raković (SRB)
25 June 2022; 19:30	Report	Genidounias 5	Goals	Božić 2	Debrecen Swimming Pool Complex, Debrecen; Referees: Harvey Hinds (CUR), Ivan Raković (SRB)

13–15th place semifinals

27 June 2022; 17:00	Report	Brazil	9–10	Germany	Szeged Tiszavirág Pool, Szeged; Referees: Radu Matache (ROU), Levan Bertishvili (GEO)
27 June 2022; 17:00	Report	Score by quarters: 2–2, 3–2, 3–3, 1–3			Szeged Tiszavirág Pool, Szeged; Referees: Radu Matache (ROU), Levan Bertishvili (GEO)
27 June 2022; 17:00	Report	Coutinho 3	Goals	Küppers, Strelezkij 3	Szeged Tiszavirág Pool, Szeged; Referees: Radu Matache (ROU), Levan Bertishvili (GEO)

13th place game

29 June 2022; 15:30	Report	Germany	16–7	Kazakhstan	Szeged Tiszavirág Pool, Szeged; Referees: Levan Berishvili (GEO), Agustin Pinski (ARG)
29 June 2022; 15:30	Report	Score by quarters: 4–2, 4–2, 3–1, 5–2			Szeged Tiszavirág Pool, Szeged; Referees: Levan Berishvili (GEO), Agustin Pinski (ARG)
29 June 2022; 15:30	Report	Küppers 4	Goals	Shakenov 3	Szeged Tiszavirág Pool, Szeged; Referees: Levan Berishvili (GEO), Agustin Pinski (ARG)
