= New Zealand at the 2022 World Aquatics Championships =

- Flag of New Zealand
- FINA code: NZL
- National federation: Swimming New Zealand

in Budapest, Hungary
- Competitors: 42 in 5 sports
- Medals: Gold 0 Silver 0 Bronze 0 Total 0

World Aquatics Championships appearances
- 1973; 1975; 1978; 1982; 1986; 1991; 1994; 1998; 2001; 2003; 2005; 2007; 2009; 2011; 2013; 2015; 2017; 2019; 2022; 2023; 2024

New Zealand competed at the 2022 World Aquatics Championships in Budapest, Hungary from 18 June to 3 July.

== Artistic swimming ==
New Zealand entered 10 artistic swimmers.

Women

Athlete	Event	Preliminaries		Final	
Athlete	Event	Points	Rank	Points	Rank
Eva Morris; Eden Worsley	Duet free routine	Did not start		did not advance	
Vanessa Burmeister; Ariel Chen; Avalee Donovan-Trewhella; Eva Morris; Xiara Patino; Hannah Shatford; Karlina Steiner; Eden Worsley	Team free routine	67.6000	20	did not advance	

== Diving ==
New Zealand entered 7 divers.

Men

Athlete	Event	Preliminaries		Semifinals		Final	
Athlete	Event	Points	Rank	Points	Rank	Points	Rank
Nathan Brown	10 m platform	282.60	35	did not advance			
Luke Sipkes	10 m platform	303.00	31	did not advance			
Liam Stone	1 m springboard	326.35	22	—		did not advance	
Liam Stone	3 m springboard	296.60	42	did not advance			
Frazer Tavener	3 m springboard	276.10	46	did not advance			
Liam Stone; Frazer Tavener	Synchronized 3 m springboard	337.86	10 Q	—		322.11	12
Arno Lee; Luke Sipkes	Synchronized 10 m platform	257.82	13	—		did not advance	

Women

Athlete	Event	Preliminaries		Semifinals		Final	
Athlete	Event	Points	Rank	Points	Rank	Points	Rank
Mikali Dawson	10 m platform	174.25	32	did not advance			
Maggie Squire	1 m springboard	185.50	41	did not advance			
Maggie Squire	3 m springboard	197.80	34	did not advance			

Mixed

Athlete	Event	Final	
Athlete	Event	Points	Rank
Liam Stone; Mikali Dawson	Team	227.90	13
Frazer Tavener; Maggie Squire	Synchronized 3 m springboard	223.86	13

== Open water swimming ==
New Zealand entered 1 open water female swimmers

Women

Athlete	Event	Time	Rank
Ruby Heath	5 km	1:05:15.7	39
Ruby Heath	10 km	2:13:44.6	44
Ruby Heath	25 km	did not finish	

== Swimming ==
New Zealand entered 12 swimmers.

Men

Athlete	Event	Heat		Semifinal		Final	
Athlete	Event	Time	Rank	Time	Rank	Time	Rank
Lewis Clareburt	200 m individual medley	1:58.76	10 Q	1:57.63	7 Q	1:58.11	7
Lewis Clareburt	400 m individual medley	4:12.39	7 Q	—		4:10.98	4
Cameron Gray	200 m freestyle	1:50.64	39	did not advance			
Cameron Gray	50 m butterfly	24.01	35	did not advance			
Andrew Jeffcoat	50 m backstroke	25.06	11 Q	24.91	13	did not advance	
Andrew Jeffcoat	100 m backstroke	54.35	18	did not advance			
Michael Pickett	50 m freestyle	22.59	34	did not advance			
Carter Swift	100 m freestyle	48.79 NR	21	did not advance			

Women

Athlete	Event	Heat		Semifinal		Final	
Athlete	Event	Time	Rank	Time	Rank	Time	Rank
Caitlin Deans	1500 m freestyle	16:30.47	13	—		did not advance	
Chelsey Edwards	50 m freestyle	25.91	23	did not advance			
Erika Fairweather	200 m freestyle	1:58.26	11 Q	1:57.43	11	did not advance	
Erika Fairweather	400 m freestyle	4:06.00	6 Q	—		4:04.73	6
Helena Gasson	50 m breaststroke	32.08	31	did not advance			
Helena Gasson	50 m butterfly	26.67	20	did not advance			
Helena Gasson	200 m butterfly	did not start		did not advance			
Helena Gasson	200 m individual medley	2:15.95	22	did not advance			
Laura Littlejohn	100 m freestyle	did not start		did not advance			
Mya Rasmussen	400 m individual medley	4:41.98	10	—		did not advance	
Eve Thomas	400 m freestyle	4:09.49	13	—		did not advance	
Eve Thomas	800 m freestyle	8:27.82	6 Q	—		8:30.37	7
Erika Fairweather; Eve Thomas; Caitlin Deans; Laura Littlejohn	4 × 200 m freestyle relay	8:04.87	9 Q	—		7:59.08	7

Mixed

Athlete	Event	Heat		Final	
Athlete	Event	Time	Rank	Time	Rank
Lewis Clareburt; Carter Swift; Chelsey Edwards; Laura Littlejohn	4 × 100 m freestyle relay	3:27.91 NR	9	did not advance	

== Water polo ==
Summary

Team	Event	Group stage				Playoff	Quarterfinal	Semifinal	Final / BM	
Team	Event	Opposition Score	Opposition Score	Opposition Score	Rank	Opposition Score	Opposition Score	Opposition Score	Opposition Score	Rank
New Zealand	Women's tournament	Brazil; W 12–8	Australia; L 2–11	Kazakhstan; W 15–11	2 P/off	France; L 13–14	—	Argentina; W 13–7	Canada; L 11–20	10

=== Women's tournament ===
Team roster

The following is New Zealand roster in the Water polo at the 2022 World Aquatics Championships – Women's tournament.

Head coach: (United Kingdom) Angela Winstanley-Smith

- 1 Jessica Milicich GK
- 2 Emily Nicholson CF
- 3 Bernadette Doyle FP
- 4 Elizabeth Gault FP
- 5 Gabrielle Milicich FP
- 6 Morgan McDowall CF
- 7 Emmerson Houghton CB
- 8 Katie McKenty CB
- 9 Sophie Shorter-Robinson CF
- 10 Gabriella MacDonald FP
- 11 Malia Josephson FP
- 12 Millie Quin FP
- 13 Bridget Layburn GK

Group play

Pos	Team	Pld	W	D	L	GF	GA	GD	Pts	Qualification
1	Australia	3	3	0	0	47	13	+34	6	Quarterfinals
2	New Zealand	3	2	0	1	29	30	−1	4	Playoffs
3	Kazakhstan	3	1	0	2	27	40	−13	2	Playoffs
4	Brazil	3	0	0	3	19	39	−20	0	

Source: Sportresult
Rules for classification: 1) points; 2) head-to-head points; 3) head-to-head goal difference; 4) head-to-head number of goals scored; 5) Goal difference.

20 June 2022; 18:00	Report	New Zealand	12–8	Brazil	Sopron Lőver Pool, Sopron; Referees: Radu Matache (ROU), Agustin Pinski (ARG)
20 June 2022; 18:00	Report	Score by quarters: 3–3, 5–2, 3–3, 1–0			Sopron Lőver Pool, Sopron; Referees: Radu Matache (ROU), Agustin Pinski (ARG)
20 June 2022; 18:00	Report	McDowall 4	Goals	Leão 3	Sopron Lőver Pool, Sopron; Referees: Radu Matache (ROU), Agustin Pinski (ARG)

22 June 2022; 18:00	Report	Australia	11–2	New Zealand	Sopron Lőver Pool, Sopron; Referees: Asumi Tsuzaki (JPN), Agustin Pinski (ARG)
22 June 2022; 18:00	Report	Score by quarters: 3–1, 4–1, 3–0, 1–0			Sopron Lőver Pool, Sopron; Referees: Asumi Tsuzaki (JPN), Agustin Pinski (ARG)
22 June 2022; 18:00	Report	Halligan 3	Goals	McDowall, Nicholson 1	Sopron Lőver Pool, Sopron; Referees: Asumi Tsuzaki (JPN), Agustin Pinski (ARG)

24 June 2022; 19:30	Report	Kazakhstan	11–15	New Zealand	Sopron Lőver Pool, Sopron; Referees: Maro Savinović (CRO), Agustin Pinski (ARG)
24 June 2022; 19:30	Report	Score by quarters: 3–4, 5–2, 2–5, 1–4			Sopron Lőver Pool, Sopron; Referees: Maro Savinović (CRO), Agustin Pinski (ARG)
24 June 2022; 19:30	Report	Muravyeva 3	Goals	Josephson 4	Sopron Lőver Pool, Sopron; Referees: Maro Savinović (CRO), Agustin Pinski (ARG)

Playoffs

26 June 2022; 15:30	Report	New Zealand	13–14	France	Alfréd Hajós National Swimming Stadium, Budapest; Referees: Georgios Stavridis (GRE), Adil Aimbetov (KAZ)
26 June 2022; 15:30	Report	Score by quarters: 2–1, 3–3, 2–3, 2–2 PSO: 4–5			Alfréd Hajós National Swimming Stadium, Budapest; Referees: Georgios Stavridis (GRE), Adil Aimbetov (KAZ)
26 June 2022; 15:30	Report	McDowall 5	Goals	Dhalluin 4	Alfréd Hajós National Swimming Stadium, Budapest; Referees: Georgios Stavridis (GRE), Adil Aimbetov (KAZ)

9–12th place semifinals

28 June 2022; 17:00	Report	Argentina	7–13	New Zealand	Szeged Tiszavirag Pool, Szeged; Referees: Levan Berishvili (GEO), Radu Matache (ROU)
28 June 2022; 17:00	Report	Score by quarters: 3–3, 2–4, 1–4, 1–2			Szeged Tiszavirag Pool, Szeged; Referees: Levan Berishvili (GEO), Radu Matache (ROU)
28 June 2022; 17:00	Report	Ruiz 3	Goals	five players 2	Szeged Tiszavirag Pool, Szeged; Referees: Levan Berishvili (GEO), Radu Matache (ROU)

Ninth place game

30 June 2022; 18:30	Report	New Zealand	11–20	Canada	Szeged Tiszavirag Pool, Szeged; Referees: Pascal Bouchez (FRA), Veselin Mišković (MNE)
30 June 2022; 18:30	Report	Score by quarters: 1–4, 1–5, 5–6, 4–5			Szeged Tiszavirag Pool, Szeged; Referees: Pascal Bouchez (FRA), Veselin Mišković (MNE)
30 June 2022; 18:30	Report	Houghton 6	Goals	Lekness 4	Szeged Tiszavirag Pool, Szeged; Referees: Pascal Bouchez (FRA), Veselin Mišković (MNE)
