= Swimming at the 2022 World Aquatics Championships – Women's 100 metre breaststroke =

Women's 100 metre breaststroke at the 2022 World Aquatics Championships
- Venue: Danube Arena
- Location: Budapest, Hungary
- Dates: 19 June (heats and semifinals); 20 June (final)
- Competitors: 52 from 46 nations
- Winning time: 1:05.93

Medalists
gold medal	Benedetta Pilato	Italy
silver medal	Anna Elendt	Germany
bronze medal	Rūta Meilutytė	Lithuania

The Women's 100 metre breaststroke competition at the 2022 World Aquatics Championships was held on 19 and 20 June 2022.

== Records ==
Prior to the competition, the existing world and championship records were as follows.

World record	Lilly King (USA)	1:04.13	Budapest, Hungary	25 July 2017
Competition record	Lilly King (USA)	1:04.13	Budapest, Hungary	25 July 2017

== Results ==
=== Heats ===
The heats were started on 19 June at 09:32.

Rank	Heat	Lane	Name	Nationality	Time	Notes
1	6	6	Tang Qianting	China	1:05.99	Q
2	6	2	Jenna Strauch	Australia	1:06.16	Q
3	4	4	Annie Lazor	United States	1:06.33	Q
4	5	3	Arianna Castiglioni	Italy	1:06.49	Q
5	6	5	Anna Elendt	Germany	1:06.54	Q
6	4	5	Sophie Hansson	Sweden	1:06.61	Q
7	6	4	Lilly King	United States	1:06.65	Q
8	4	3	Benedetta Pilato	Italy	1:06.68	Q
9	4	1	Rūta Meilutytė	Lithuania	1:06.71	Q
10	6	3	Lara van Niekerk	South Africa	1:06.75	Q
11	5	6	Molly Renshaw	Great Britain	1:06.83	Q
12	4	6	Kotryna Teterevkova	Lithuania	1:06.97	Q
13	5	2	Eneli Jefimova	Estonia	1:07.09	Q
14	6	1	Tes Schouten	Netherlands	1:07.18	Q
15	5	5	Yu Jingyao	China	1:07.19	Q
16	5	4	Reona Aoki	Japan	1:07.35	Q
17	6	8	Jhennifer Conceição	Brazil	1:07.40	
18	5	7	Anastasia Gorbenko	Israel	1:07.88	
19	4	7	Abbey Harkin	Australia	1:08.12	
20	5	1	Jessica Vall	Spain	1:08.38	
21	3	6	Moon Su-a	South Korea	1:08.50	
22	6	0	Letitia Sim	Singapore	1:08.59	
23	4	9	Macarena Ceballos	Argentina	1:08.63	
24	5	8	Sophie Angus	Canada	1:08.76	
25	4	0	Melissa Rodríguez	Mexico	1:08.95	
26	4	8	Florine Gaspard	Belgium	1:09.22	
27	3	4	Veera Kivirinta	Finland	1:09.26	
28	3	5	Kristýna Horská	Czech Republic	1:09.39	
29	3	8	Kamila Isaieva	Ukraine	1:09.66	
30	3	3	Adèle Blanchetière	France	1:09.68	
31	6	7	Emelie Fast	Sweden	1:09.81	
32	2	4	Nicole Frank	Uruguay	1:10.48	
33	3	0	Karina Vivas	Colombia	1:10.60	
34	6	9	Diana Petkova	Bulgaria	1:10.81	
35	3	1	Maria Drasidou	Greece	1:11.00	
36	5	0	Petra Halmai	Hungary	1:11.09	
37	3	2	Lena Kreundl	Austria	1:11.24	
38	2	3	Emily Santos	Panama	1:12.11	
39	2	6	Adelaida Pchelintseva	Kazakhstan	1:12.40	
40	3	7	Lin Pei-wun	Chinese Taipei	1:13.09	
41	3	9	Lillian Hoggs	Bahamas	1:13.13	
42	2	5	Phiangkhwan Pawapotako	Thailand	1:13.23	
43	2	1	Tessa Ip Hen Cheung	Mauritius	1:14.83	
44	2	2	Kirsten Fisher-Marsters	Cook Islands	1:15.57	
45	2	7	Marina Abu Shamaleh	Palestine	1:15.80	
46	2	0	Polyxeni Toumazou	Cyprus	1:16.14	
47	1	3	Duana Lama	Nepal	1:17.58	NR
48	2	8	Jayla Pina	Cape Verde	1:18.02	
49	2	9	Maria Freitas	Angola	1:18.55	
50	1	4	Lara Dashti	Kuwait	1:21.00	
51	1	6	Makelyta Singsombath	Laos	1:22.75	
52	1	5	Maria Battalones	Northern Mariana Islands	1:26.01	
–	4	2	Lisa Mamié	Switzerland	Did not start	
–	5	9	Phee Jinq En	Malaysia	Did not start	

=== Semifinals ===
The semifinals were started on 18 June at 18:29.

Rank	Heat	Lane	Name	Nationality	Time	Notes
1	2	3	Anna Elendt	Germany	1:05.62	Q
2	1	6	Benedetta Pilato	Italy	1:05.88	Q
3	2	4	Tang Qianting	China	1:05.97	Q
4	2	2	Rūta Meilutytė	Lithuania	1:06.04	Q
5	1	8	Reona Aoki	Japan	1:06.07	Q
6	1	3	Sophie Hansson	Sweden	1:06.30	Q
7	2	7	Molly Renshaw	Great Britain	1:06.39	Q
8	2	6	Lilly King	United States	1:06.40	Q
9	2	1	Eneli Jefimova	Estonia	1:06.48	
10	1	4	Jenna Strauch	Australia	1:06.49	
11	1	5	Arianna Castiglioni	Italy	1:06.59	
12	1	7	Kotryna Teterevkova	Lithuania	1:06.74	
13	1	2	Lara van Niekerk	South Africa	1:06.75	
14	2	8	Yu Jingyao	China	1:06.78	
15	1	1	Tes Schouten	Netherlands	1:07.20	
	2	5	Annie Lazor	United States	Disqualified	

=== Final ===
The finals was started on 20 June at 19:48.

Rank	Lane	Name	Nationality	Time	Notes
1st place, gold medalist(s)	5	Benedetta Pilato	Italy	1:05.93	
2nd place, silver medalist(s)	4	Anna Elendt	Germany	1:05.98	
3rd place, bronze medalist(s)	6	Rūta Meilutytė	Lithuania	1:06.02	
4	8	Lilly King	United States	1:06.07	
5	2	Reona Aoki	Japan	1:06.38	
6	7	Sophie Hansson	Sweden	1:06.39	
7	3	Tang Qianting	China	1:06.41	
8	1	Molly Renshaw	Great Britain	1:06.60	
