= Spain at the 2022 World Aquatics Championships =

- Flag of Spain
- World Aquatics code: ESP
- National federation: Royal Spanish Swimming Federation

in Budapest, Hungary
- Competitors: 50 in 5 sports
- Medals Ranked 16th: Gold 1 Silver 0 Bronze 1 Total 2

World Aquatics Championships appearances
- 1973; 1975; 1978; 1982; 1986; 1991; 1994; 1998; 2001; 2003; 2005; 2007; 2009; 2011; 2013; 2015; 2017; 2019; 2022; 2023; 2024; 2025

Spain competed at the 2022 World Aquatics Championships in Budapest, Hungary from 18 June to 3 July.

== Medalists ==
Medal	Name	Sport	Event	Date
Gold	Spain men's national water polo team: Unai Aguirre; Alberto Munárriz; Álvaro Granados; Bernat Sanahuja; Miguel de Toro; Marc Larumbe; Martin Famera; Sergi Cabanas; Roger Tahull; Felipe Perrone; Blai Mallarach; Alejandro Bustos; Eduardo Lorrio	Water polo	Men's tournament	3 July
Bronze	Cristina Arámbula; Abril Conesa; Berta Ferreras; Emma García; Mireia Hernández; Meritxell Mas; Alisa Ozhogina; Paula Ramírez; Iris Tió; Blanca Toledano	Artistic swimming	Highlight routine	25 June

== Artistic swimming ==
Spain entered 12 artistic swimmers.

Women

Athlete	Event	Preliminaries		Final	
Athlete	Event	Points	Rank	Points	Rank
Iris Tió	Solo free routine	89.0333	6 Q	89.7000	6
Alisa Ozhogina; Iris Tió	Duet free routine	89.9667	5 Q	90.6667	5
Cristina Arámbula; Abril Conesa; Berta Ferreras; Meritxell Mas; Alisa Ozhogina; Paula Ramírez; Iris Tió; Blanca Toledano	Team free routine	91.4333	4 Q	92.0000	4
Cristina Arámbula; Abril Conesa; Berta Ferreras; Emma García; Mireia Hernández; Meritxell Mas; Alisa Ozhogina; Paula Ramírez; Iris Tió; Blanca Toledano	Highlight routine	91.3667	3 Q	91.9333	3rd place, bronze medalist(s)

Mixed

Athlete	Event	Preliminaries		Final	
Athlete	Event	Points	Rank	Points	Rank
Emma García; Pau Ribes	Duet technical routine	84.3709	4 Q	84.4829	4
Emma García; Pau Ribes	Duet free routine	86.1667	4 Q	87.1333	4

== Diving ==
Spain entered 3 divers.

Men

Athlete	Event	Preliminaries		Semifinals		Final	
Athlete	Event	Points	Rank	Points	Rank	Points	Rank
Adrián Abadía	1 m springboard	277.50	38	—N/a		did not advance	
Alberto Arévalo	1 m springboard	311.35	31	—N/a		did not advance	
Alberto Arévalo	3 m springboard	378.40	13 Q	356.95	13 Q	360.50	11
Nicolás García	3 m springboard	360.35	21	did not advance			
Adrián Abadía; Nicolás García	Synchronized 3 m springboard	331.02	12 Q	—N/a		354.60	10

== Open water swimming ==
Spain entered 4 open water swimmers (2 male and 2 female)

Men

Athlete	Event	Time	Rank
Alberto Martínez	10 km	1:54:25.0	14
Alberto Martínez	25 km	5:04:22.5	10

Women

Athlete	Event	Time	Rank
María de Valdés	5 km	57:59.0	5
María de Valdés	10 km	2:02:42.8	10
Ángela Martínez	5 km	1:00:49.5	14
Ángela Martínez	10 km	2:06:50.9	25

Mixed

Athlete	Event	Time	Rank
María de Valdés; Ángela Martínez; Alberto Martínez; Carlos Garach	Team	Disqualified	

== Swimming ==
Spain entered 8 swimmers.

Men

Athlete	Event	Heat		Semifinal		Final	
Athlete	Event	Time	Rank	Time	Rank	Time	Rank
Carles Coll	100 m breaststroke	1:02.52	34	did not advance			
Carles Coll	200 m breaststroke	Disqualified		did not advance			
Sergio de Celis	100 m freestyle	49.46	32	did not advance			
Sergio de Celis	200 m freestyle	1:50.03	36	did not advance			
Carlos Garach	800 m freestyle	8:05.52	19	—N/a		did not advance	
Carlos Garach	1500 m freestyle	15:30.62	18	—N/a		did not advance	
Hugo González	50 m backstroke	25.26	19	did not advance			
Hugo González	100 m backstroke	53.74	10 Q	53.50	11	did not advance	
Hugo González	200 m backstroke	1:59.61	15 Q	1:59.05	13	did not advance	
Hugo González	200 m individual medley	1:59.53	16 Q	1:58.41	12	did not advance	
Alberto Lozano	50 m butterfly	23.72	28	did not advance			
Alberto Lozano	100 m butterfly	52.98	30	did not advance			
Hugo González; Carles Coll; Alberto Lozano; Sergio de Celis	4 × 100 m medley relay	3:36.10	12	—N/a		did not advance	

Women

Athlete	Event	Heat		Semifinal		Final	
Athlete	Event	Time	Rank	Time	Rank	Time	Rank
Ángela Martínez	800 m freestyle	8:45.12	16	—N/a		did not advance	
Ángela Martínez	1500 m freestyle	16:38.39	15	—N/a		did not advance	
Paula Otero	400 m freestyle	4:18.90	24	did not advance			
Paula Otero	800 m freestyle	did not start		—N/a		did not advance	
Paula Otero	1500 m freestyle	16:57.76	20	—N/a		did not advance	
Jessica Vall	50 m breaststroke	31.92	27	did not advance			
Jessica Vall	100 m breaststroke	1:08.38	20	did not advance			
Jessica Vall	200 m breaststroke	2:28.08	17	did not advance			

== Water polo ==
Summary

Team	Event	Group stage				Playoff	Quarterfinal	Semifinal	Final / BM	
Team	Event	Opposition Score	Opposition Score	Opposition Score	Rank	Opposition Score	Opposition Score	Opposition Score	Opposition Score	Rank
Spain	Men's tournament	Canada annulled	South Africa; W 28–2	Italy; W 14–12	1 QF	—N/a	Montenegro; W 7–6	Croatia; W 10–5	Italy; W 15–14	1st place, gold medalist(s)
Spain	Women's tournament	France; W 18–8	Greece; D 10–10	Thailand; W 30–2	2 P/off	Kazakhstan; W 14–1	United States; L 8–13	France; W 18–5	Australia; W 8–5	5

=== Men's tournament ===
Team roster

The following is Spanish roster in the Water polo at the 2022 World Aquatics Championships – Men's tournament.

Head coach: David Martín

- 1 Unai Aguirre GK
- 2 Alberto Munárriz FP
- 3 Álvaro Granados FP
- 4 Bernat Sanahuja FP
- 5 Miguel de Toro CF
- 6 Marc Larumbe FP
- 7 Martin Famera FP
- 8 Sergi Cabanas FP
- 9 Roger Tahull CF
- 10 Felipe Perrone FP
- 11 Blai Mallarach FP
- 12 Alejandro Bustos FP
- 13 Eduardo Lorrio GK

Group play

Pos	Team	Pld	W	D	L	GF	GA	GD	Pts	Qualification
1	Spain	2	2	0	0	42	14	+28	4	Quarterfinals
2	Italy	2	1	0	1	34	18	+16	2	Playoffs
3	South Africa	2	0	0	2	6	50	−44	0	Playoffs
4	Canada (Note: On 24 June, the Canadian team withdrew from the tournament after multiple positive COVID-19 cases amongst the team.)	0	0	0	0	0	0	0	0	Withdrew

Source: Sportresult
Rules for classification: 1) points; 2) head-to-head points; 3) head-to-head goal difference; 4) head-to-head number of goals scored; 5) Goal difference.
Notes:

21 June 2022 (Annulled) (Note: The Canadian national team later withdrew, so the result of the match was canceled and annulled afterward.); 19:30	Report	Canada	2–19	Spain	Sopron Lover Pool, Sopron; Referees: György Kun (HUN), Agustin Pinski (ARG)
21 June 2022 (Annulled); 19:30	Report	Score by quarters: 0–2, 2–7, 0–6, 0–4			Sopron Lover Pool, Sopron; Referees: György Kun (HUN), Agustin Pinski (ARG)
21 June 2022 (Annulled); 19:30	Report	Constantin-Bicari, D'Souza 1	Goals	Perrone 5	Sopron Lover Pool, Sopron; Referees: György Kun (HUN), Agustin Pinski (ARG)

23 June 2022; 18:00	Report	Spain	28–2	South Africa	Sopron Lőver Pool, Sopron; Referees: Wallop Jirathornwattana (THA), Agustin Pinski (ARG)
23 June 2022; 18:00	Report	Score by quarters: 7–1, 7–0, 6–1, 8–0			Sopron Lőver Pool, Sopron; Referees: Wallop Jirathornwattana (THA), Agustin Pinski (ARG)
23 June 2022; 18:00	Report	Granados 6	Goals	Cronje, Howard 1	Sopron Lőver Pool, Sopron; Referees: Wallop Jirathornwattana (THA), Agustin Pinski (ARG)

25 June 2022; 18:00	Report	Italy	12–14	Spain	Sopron Lőver Pool, Sopron; Referees: Boris Margeta (SLO), Michiel Zwart (NED)
25 June 2022; 18:00	Report	Score by quarters: 4–5, 6–3, 2–2, 0–4			Sopron Lőver Pool, Sopron; Referees: Boris Margeta (SLO), Michiel Zwart (NED)
25 June 2022; 18:00	Report	Di Somma 3	Goals	Granados 3	Sopron Lőver Pool, Sopron; Referees: Boris Margeta (SLO), Michiel Zwart (NED)

Quarterfinal

29 June 2022; 19:30	Report	Spain	7–6	Montenegro	Alfréd Hajós National Swimming Stadium, Budapest; Referees: Michael Goldenberg (USA), Raffaele Colombo (ITA)
29 June 2022; 19:30	Report	Score by quarters: 2–1, 3–2, 1–2, 1–1			Alfréd Hajós National Swimming Stadium, Budapest; Referees: Michael Goldenberg (USA), Raffaele Colombo (ITA)
29 June 2022; 19:30	Report	Mallarach 2	Goals	Đurđić 2	Alfréd Hajós National Swimming Stadium, Budapest; Referees: Michael Goldenberg (USA), Raffaele Colombo (ITA)

Semifinal

1 July 2022; 19:30	Report	Spain	10–5	Croatia	Alfréd Hajós National Swimming Stadium, Budapest; Referees: Boris Margeta (SLO), Frank Ohme (GER)
1 July 2022; 19:30	Report	Score by quarters: 3–3, 4–2, 0–0, 3–0			Alfréd Hajós National Swimming Stadium, Budapest; Referees: Boris Margeta (SLO), Frank Ohme (GER)
1 July 2022; 19:30	Report	Granados 4	Goals	Bukić 2	Alfréd Hajós National Swimming Stadium, Budapest; Referees: Boris Margeta (SLO), Frank Ohme (GER)

Final

3 July 2022; 20:00	Report	Italy	14–15 (PSO)	Spain	Alfréd Hajós National Swimming Stadium, Budapest; Referees: Boris Margeta (SLO), Georgios Stavridis (GRE)
3 July 2022; 20:00	Report	Score by quarters: 3–3, 0–3, 3–2, 3–1 PSO: 5–6			Alfréd Hajós National Swimming Stadium, Budapest; Referees: Boris Margeta (SLO), Georgios Stavridis (GRE)
3 July 2022; 20:00	Report	Cannella 2	Goals	Granados 4	Alfréd Hajós National Swimming Stadium, Budapest; Referees: Boris Margeta (SLO), Georgios Stavridis (GRE)

=== Women's tournament ===
Team roster

The following is Spanish roster in the Water polo at the 2022 World Aquatics Championships – Women's tournament.

Head coach: Miki Oca

- 1 Laura Ester GK
- 2 Cristina Nogue Frigola FP
- 3 Anni Espar FP
- 4 Beatriz Ortiz FP
- 5 Nona Perez Vivas FP
- 6 Irene González FP
- 7 Elena Ruiz FP
- 8 Pili Peña FP
- 9 Judith Forca FP
- 10 Paula Camus FP
- 11 Maica García Godoy CF
- 12 Paula Leitón CF
- 13 Martina Terre GK

Group play

Pos	Team	Pld	W	D	L	GF	GA	GD	Pts	Qualification
1	Greece	3	2	1	0	53	15	+38	5 (Note: Spain 10–10 Greece)	Quarterfinals
2	Spain	3	2	1	0	58	20	+38	5	Playoffs
3	France	3	1	0	2	36	41	−5	2	Playoffs
4	Thailand	3	0	0	3	11	82	−71	0	

Source: Sportresult
Rules for classification: 1) points; 2) head-to-head points; 3) head-to-head goal difference; 4) head-to-head number of goals scored; 5) Goal difference.
Notes:

20 June 2022; 19:30	Report	France	8–18	Spain	Szeged Tiszavirag Pool, Szeged; Referees: Levan Berishvili (GEO), Raffaele Colombo (ITA)
20 June 2022; 19:30	Report	Score by quarters: 1–4, 3–3, 2–5, 2–6			Szeged Tiszavirag Pool, Szeged; Referees: Levan Berishvili (GEO), Raffaele Colombo (ITA)
20 June 2022; 19:30	Report	Vernoux 4	Goals	Forca 5	Szeged Tiszavirag Pool, Szeged; Referees: Levan Berishvili (GEO), Raffaele Colombo (ITA)

22 June 2022; 18:00	Report	Spain	10–10	Greece	Szeged Tiszavirag Pool, Szeged; Referees: Levan Berishvili (GEO), Veselin Mišković (MNE)
22 June 2022; 18:00	Report	Score by quarters: 2–3, 4–3, 2–2, 2–2			Szeged Tiszavirag Pool, Szeged; Referees: Levan Berishvili (GEO), Veselin Mišković (MNE)
22 June 2022; 18:00	Report	Ruiz 4	Goals	E. Plevritou, V. Plevritou 3	Szeged Tiszavirag Pool, Szeged; Referees: Levan Berishvili (GEO), Veselin Mišković (MNE)

24 June 2022; 18:00	Report	Thailand	2–30	Spain	Szeged Tiszavirag Pool, Szeged; Referees: Fabio Toffoli (BRA), Veselin Mišković (MNE)
24 June 2022; 18:00	Report	Score by quarters: 0–5, 0–7, 2–11, 0–7			Szeged Tiszavirag Pool, Szeged; Referees: Fabio Toffoli (BRA), Veselin Mišković (MNE)
24 June 2022; 18:00	Report	Puangtong 2	Goals	Forca 7	Szeged Tiszavirag Pool, Szeged; Referees: Fabio Toffoli (BRA), Veselin Mišković (MNE)

Playoffs

26 June 2022; 17:00	Report	Kazakhstan	1–14	Spain	Alfréd Hajós National Swimming Stadium, Budapest; Referees: Helene Painchaud (CAN), Harvey Hinds (CUR)
26 June 2022; 17:00	Report	Score by quarters: 0–4, 1–2, 0–7, 0–1			Alfréd Hajós National Swimming Stadium, Budapest; Referees: Helene Painchaud (CAN), Harvey Hinds (CUR)
26 June 2022; 17:00	Report	Turova 1	Goals	Ortiz 4	Alfréd Hajós National Swimming Stadium, Budapest; Referees: Helene Painchaud (CAN), Harvey Hinds (CUR)

Quarterfinals

28 June 2022; 16:00	Report	United States	13–8	Spain	Alfréd Hajós National Swimming Stadium, Budapest; Referees: Georgios Stavridis (GRE), Frank Ohme (GER)
28 June 2022; 16:00	Report	Score by quarters: 3–3, 3–2, 5–3, 2–0			Alfréd Hajós National Swimming Stadium, Budapest; Referees: Georgios Stavridis (GRE), Frank Ohme (GER)
28 June 2022; 16:00	Report	Haralabidis 6	Goals	Forca, García Godoy 2	Alfréd Hajós National Swimming Stadium, Budapest; Referees: Georgios Stavridis (GRE), Frank Ohme (GER)

5th–8tth place semifinal

30 June 2022; 14:30	Report	France	5–18	Spain	Alfréd Hajós National Swimming Stadium, Budapest; Referees: Adil Aimbetov (KAZ), Dion Willis (RSA)
30 June 2022; 14:30	Report	Score by quarters: 1–3, 2–3, 1–5, 1–7			Alfréd Hajós National Swimming Stadium, Budapest; Referees: Adil Aimbetov (KAZ), Dion Willis (RSA)
30 June 2022; 14:30	Report	five players 1	Goals	four players 3	Alfréd Hajós National Swimming Stadium, Budapest; Referees: Adil Aimbetov (KAZ), Dion Willis (RSA)

Fifth place game

2 July 2022; 17:00	Report	Spain	8–5	Australia	Alfréd Hajós National Swimming Stadium, Budapest; Referees: Helene Painchaud (CAN), Ivan Raković (SRB)
2 July 2022; 17:00	Report	Score by quarters: 2–0, 1–1, 3–1, 2–3			Alfréd Hajós National Swimming Stadium, Budapest; Referees: Helene Painchaud (CAN), Ivan Raković (SRB)
2 July 2022; 17:00	Report	three players 2	Goals	five players 1	Alfréd Hajós National Swimming Stadium, Budapest; Referees: Helene Painchaud (CAN), Ivan Raković (SRB)
