= Swimming at the 2022 World Aquatics Championships – Women's 50 metre breaststroke =

Women's 50 metre breaststroke at the 2022 World Aquatics Championships
- Venue: Danube Arena
- Location: Budapest, Hungary
- Dates: 24 June (heats and semifinals); 25 June (final)
- Competitors: 56 from 50 nations
- Winning time: 29.70

Medalists
gold medal	Rūta Meilutytė	Lithuania
silver medal	Benedetta Pilato	Italy
bronze medal	Lara van Niekerk	South Africa

The Women's 50 metre breaststroke competition at the 2022 World Aquatics Championships was held on 24 and 25 June 2022.

== Records ==
Prior to the competition, the existing world and championship records were as follows.

World record	Benedetta Pilato (ITA)	29.30	Budapest, Hungary	22 May 2021
Competition record	Lilly King (USA)	29.40	Budapest, Hungary	30 July 2017

== Results ==
=== Heats ===
The heats were started on 24 June at 09:38.

Rank	Heat	Lane	Name	Nationality	Time	Notes
1	5	4	Lara van Niekerk	South Africa	29.77	Q
2	6	4	Benedetta Pilato	Italy	29.80	Q
3	6	2	Eneli Jefimova	Estonia	30.08	Q, NR
4	5	1	Anna Elendt	Germany	30.12	Q
5	6	7	Tang Qianting	China	30.36	Q
6	5	3	Jhennifer Conceição	Brazil	30.53	Q
7	6	3	Sophie Hansson	Sweden	30.64	Q
8	5	2	Veera Kivirinta	Finland	30.66	Q
9	4	4	Lilly King	United States	30.70	Q
9	6	8	Fleur Vermeiren	Belgium	30.70	Q
11	5	6	Rosey Metz	Netherlands	30.71	Q
12	4	5	Reona Aoki	Japan	30.80	Q
13	4	3	Anastasia Gorbenko	Israel	30.82	Q
14	5	7	Jenna Strauch	Australia	30.93	Q
15	4	2	Annie Lazor	United States	30.99	Q
16	5	5	Rūta Meilutytė	Lithuania	31.02	Q
17	6	6	Florine Gaspard	Belgium	31.10	
18	4	0	Rachel Nicol	Canada	31.24	
19	4	1	Anna Sztankovics	Hungary	31.31	
20	5	8	Macarena Ceballos	Argentina	31.35	
21	6	0	Anne Palmans	Netherlands	31.37	
22	4	7	Kotryna Teterevkova	Lithuania	31.40	
23	4	8	Tara Vovk	Slovenia	31.61	
24	3	3	Byanca Rodríguez	Mexico	31.71	
25	3	5	Adelaida Pchelintseva	Kazakhstan	31.75	
26	6	1	Maria Drasidou	Greece	31.83	
27	5	0	Jessica Vall	Spain	31.92	
27	6	9	Letitia Sim	Singapore	31.92	
29	4	6	Emelie Fast	Sweden	31.94	
30	3	8	Karina Vivas	Colombia	32.07	
31	3	6	Helena Gasson	New Zealand	32.08	
32	3	2	Lena Kreundl	Austria	32.17	
33	3	4	Diana Petkova	Bulgaria	32.32	
34	4	9	Meri Mataja	Croatia	32.34	
35	5	9	Jenjira Srisa-Ard	Thailand	32.58	
36	3	7	Lin Pei-wun	Chinese Taipei	32.80	
37	3	1	Lillian Higgs	Bahamas	32.98	
38	2	3	Imane El Barodi	Morocco	32.99	
39	2	7	Polyxeni Toumazou	Cyprus	33.31	
40	2	4	Tilka Paljk	Zambia	33.64	
41	2	0	Vorleak Sok	Cambodia	33.84	
42	2	5	Kirsten Fisher-Marsters	Cook Islands	34.17	
43	2	6	Micaela Sierra	Uruguay	34.25	
44	2	2	Claudia Verdino	Monaco	34.49	
45	2	1	Jayla Pina	Cape Verde	34.97	
46	2	8	Tessa Ip Hen Cheung	Mauritius	35.04	
47	3	9	Kirabo Namutebi	Uganda	35.12	
48	2	9	Maria Freitas	Angola	35.80	
49	1	0	Duana Lima	Nepal	36.30	
50	1	4	Lara Dashti	Kuwait	37.77	
50	1	6	Maria Batallones	Northern Mariana Islands	37.77	
52	1	9	Kestra Kihleng	Federated States of Micronesia	38.97	
53	1	3	Eunike Fugo	Tanzania	42.26	
54	1	5	Brhane Amare	Ethiopia	44.30	
	1	7	Rita Ekomba	Equatorial Guinea	Disqualified	
	6	5	Arianna Castiglioni	Italy	Disqualified	
	1	1	Iman Kouraogo	Burkina Faso	Did not start	
	1	2	Sainabou Sam	Gambia	Did not start	
	1	8	Stefan Sangala	Republic of the Congo	Did not start	
	3	0	Phee Jinq En	Malaysia	Did not start	

=== Semifinals ===
The semifinals were started on 24 June at 18:27.

Rank	Heat	Lane	Name	Nationality	Time	Notes
1	1	4	Benedetta Pilato	Italy	29.83	Q
2	1	8	Rūta Meilutytė	Lithuania	29.97	Q
3	2	4	Lara van Niekerk	South Africa	29.99	Q
4	2	3	Tang Qianting	China	30.10	Q
5	2	5	Eneli Jefimova	Estonia	30.24	Q
6	1	3	Jhennifer Conceição	Brazil	30.28	Q, SA
7	1	5	Anna Elendt	Germany	30.30	Q
8	2	2	Lilly King	United States	30.35	Q
9	2	1	Anastasia Gorbenko	Israel	30.54	
10	2	6	Sophie Hansson	Sweden	30.56	
11	1	7	Reona Aoki	Japan	30.71	
12	1	6	Veera Kivirinta	Finland	30.76	
13	2	8	Annie Lazor	United States	30.89	
14	2	7	Rosey Metz	Netherlands	30.94	
15	1	2	Fleur Vermeiren	Belgium	30.98	
16	1	1	Jenna Strauch	Australia	30.99	

=== Final ===
The final was held on 25 June at 18:09.

Rank	Lane	Name	Nationality	Time	Notes
1st place, gold medalist(s)	5	Rūta Meilutytė	Lithuania	29.70	
2nd place, silver medalist(s)	4	Benedetta Pilato	Italy	29.80	
3rd place, bronze medalist(s)	3	Lara van Niekerk	South Africa	29.90	
4	6	Tang Qianting	China	30.21	
5	1	Anna Elendt	Germany	30.22	
6	2	Eneli Jefimova	Estonia	30.25	
7	8	Lilly King	United States	30.40	
8	7	Jhennifer Conceição	Brazil	30.45	
