= Swimming at the 2022 World Aquatics Championships – Men's 200 metre freestyle =

Men's 200 metre freestyle at the 2022 World Aquatics Championships
- Venue: Danube Arena
- Location: Budapest, Hungary
- Dates: 19 June (heats and semifinals); 20 June (final)
- Competitors: 61 from 53 nations
- Winning time: 1:43.21

Medalists
gold medal	David Popovici	Romania
silver medal	Hwang Sun-woo	South Korea
bronze medal	Tom Dean	Great Britain

The Men's 200 metre freestyle competition at the 2022 World Aquatics Championships was held on 19 and 20 June 2022.

== Records ==
Prior to the competition, the existing world and championship records were as follows.

World record	Paul Biedermann (GER)	1:42.00	Rome, Italy	28 July 2009
Competition record	Paul Biedermann (GER)	1:42.00	Rome, Italy	28 July 2009

== Results ==
=== Heats ===
The heats were started on 19 June at 09:51.

Rank	Heat	Lane	Name	Nationality	Time	Notes
1	7	5	David Popovici	Romania	1:45.18	
2	7	2	Hwang Sun-woo	South Korea	1:45.79	
3	7	6	Felix Auböck	Austria	1:45.84	
4	7	4	Tom Dean	Great Britain	1:45.99	
5	7	3	Drew Kibler	United States	1:46.13	
6	5	3	Elijah Winnington	Australia	1:46.19	
7	6	3	Lukas Märtens	Germany	1:46.45	
8	5	5	Danas Rapšys	Lithuania	1:46.70	
9	5	4	Fernando Scheffer	Brazil	1:46.71	
10	6	4	Katsuhiro Matsumoto	Japan	1:46.72	
11	6	5	Kieran Smith	United States	1:46.73	
12	6	6	Antonio Djakovic	Switzerland	1:47.00	
13	7	1	Marco De Tullio	Italy	1:47.27	
14	7	7	Matthew Sates	South Africa	1:47.28	
15	5	0	Roman Mityukov	Switzerland	1:47.44	
16	7	0	Jordan Pothain	France	1:47.51	
17	5	1	Robin Hanson	Sweden	1:47.54	
18	7	8	Denis Loktev	Israel	1:47.63	
19	6	0	Hadrien Salvan	France	1:47.71	
19	6	1	Ji Xinjie	China	1:47.71	
19	6	7	Nándor Németh	Hungary	1:47.71	
22	5	8	Breno Correia	Brazil	1:47.79	
23	5	7	Velimir Stjepanović	Serbia	1:47.94	
24	6	8	Stefano Di Cola	Italy	1:48.09	
25	6	9	Ruslan Gaziev	Canada	1:48.10	
26	5	2	Rafael Miroslaw	Germany	1:48.28	
27	4	4	Khiew Hoe Yean	Malaysia	1:48.37	
28	4	5	Marwan Elkamash	Egypt	1:48.48	
29	4	3	Dimitrios Markos	Greece	1:48.72	
30	5	6	Matt Richards	Great Britain	1:48.74	
31	7	9	Jorge Iga	Mexico	1:48.96	
32	6	2	Zac Incerti	Australia	1:49.12	
33	3	4	Mikel Schreuders	Aruba	1:49.39	
34	3	3	Aleksey Tarasenko	Uzbekistan	1:49.87	
35	4	1	Glen Jun Wei Lim	Singapore	1:49.94	
36	4	7	Sergio de Celis	Spain	1:50.03	
37	4	6	Wesley Roberts	Cook Islands	1:50.24	
38	4	9	Santiago Corredor	Colombia	1:50.44	
39	4	2	Cameron Gray	New Zealand	1:50.64	
40	3	5	Max Mannes	Luxembourg	1:51.06	
41	3	2	František Jablčník	Slovakia	1:51.25	
42	5	9	Cheuk Ming Ho	Hong Kong	1:51.60	
43	3	7	Pavel Alovatki	Moldova	1:51.64	
44	4	8	Hoàng Quý Phước	Vietnam	1:52.47	
45	4	0	Yordan Yanchev	Bulgaria	1:52.62	
46	3	1	Omar Abbass	Syria	1:52.78	
47	3	6	Luka Kukhalashvili	Georgia	1:53.08	
48	3	8	Noah Mascoll-Gomes	Antigua and Barbuda	1:53.30	
49	3	0	Pedro Chiancone	Uruguay	1:54.08	
50	3	9	José Campo	El Salvador	1:55.74	
51	2	6	Ramazan Omarov	Kyrgyzstan	1:56.22	
52	2	1	Salem Sabt	United Arab Emirates	1:56.40	
53	2	3	Bartal Eidesgaard	Faroe Islands	1:57.08	
54	2	4	Ado Gargović	Montenegro	1:57.74	
55	2	5	Henrique Mascarenhas	Angola	1:58.03	
56	1	4	Adnan Al-Abdallat	Jordan	1:59.70	
57	1	3	Nasir Hussain	Nepal	2:00.99	
58	2	2	Haziq Samil	Brunei	2:04.14	
59	2	8	Israel Poppe	Guam	2:05.00	
60	1	5	Eminguly Ballykov	Turkmenistan	2:05.06	
61	2	7	Sangay Tenzin	Bhutan	2:08.36	

=== Semifinals ===
The semifinals were started on 19 June at 19:14.

Rank	Heat	Lane	Name	Nationality	Time	Notes
1	2	4	David Popovici	Romania	1:44.40	WJ, NR
2	2	5	Felix Auböck	Austria	1:45.17	NR
3	1	4	Hwang Sun-woo	South Korea	1:45.46	
4	1	5	Tom Dean	Great Britain	1:45.48	
5	1	3	Elijah Winnington	Australia	1:45.53	
6	2	3	Drew Kibler	United States	1:45.54	
7	2	6	Lukas Märtens	Germany	1:45.94	
8	2	7	Kieran Smith	United States	1:46.06	
9	2	2	Fernando Scheffer	Brazil	1:46.11	
10	2	1	Marco De Tullio	Italy	1:46.29	
11	1	7	Antonio Djakovic	Switzerland	1:46.61	
12	1	1	Matthew Sates	South Africa	1:46.63	
12	1	2	Katsuhiro Matsumoto	Japan	1:46.63	
14	1	6	Danas Rapšys	Lithuania	1:46.82	
15	1	8	Jordan Pothain	France	1:47.66	
16	2	8	Roman Mityukov	Switzerland	1:47.78	

=== Final ===
The final was held on 20 June at 18:02.

Rank	Lane	Name	Nationality	Time	Notes
1st place, gold medalist(s)	4	David Popovici	Romania	1:43.21	WJ, NR
2nd place, silver medalist(s)	3	Hwang Sun-woo	South Korea	1:44.47	NR
3rd place, bronze medalist(s)	6	Tom Dean	Great Britain	1:44.98	
4	7	Drew Kibler	United States	1:45.01	
5	5	Felix Auböck	Austria	1:45.11	NR
6	8	Kieran Smith	United States	1:45.16	
7	1	Lukas Märtens	Germany	1:45.73	
8	2	Elijah Winnington	Australia	1:45.82	
