= Great Britain at the 2022 World Aquatics Championships =

- Flag of Great Britain
- World Aquatics code: GBR
- National federation: British Swimming

in Budapest, Hungary
- Competitors: 45 in 4 sports
- Medals Ranked 14th: Gold 1 Silver 4 Bronze 6 Total 11

World Aquatics Championships appearances
- 1973; 1975; 1978; 1982; 1986; 1991; 1994; 1998; 2001; 2003; 2005; 2007; 2009; 2011; 2013; 2015; 2017; 2019; 2022; 2023; 2024; 2025

Great Britain competed at the 2022 World Aquatics Championships in Budapest, Hungary from 18 June to 3 July.

== Medalists ==
Medal	Name	Sport	Event	Date
Gold	Ben Proud	Swimming	Men's 50 metre freestyle	24 June
Silver	Luke Greenbank	Swimming	Men's 200 metre backstroke	23 June
Silver	Anthony Harding; Jack Laugher	Diving	Men's synchronized 3 metre springboard	26 June
Silver	Matty Lee; Noah Williams	Diving	Men's synchronized 10 metre platform	28 June
Silver	Jack Laugher	Diving	Men's 1 metre springboard	30 June
Bronze	Tom Dean	Swimming	Men's 200 metre freestyle	20 June
Bronze	James Guy; Jacob Whittle; Joe Litchfield; Tom Dean; Matthew Richards	Swimming	Men's 4 × 200 metre freestyle relay	23 June
Bronze	Luke Greenbank; James Wilby; James Guy; Tom Dean; Jacob Peters; Lewis Burras	Swimming	Men's 4 × 100 metre medley relay	25 June
Bronze	Jack Laugher	Diving	Men's 3 metre springboard	28 June
Bronze	Andrea Spendolini-Sirieix; James Heatly	Diving	Team event	29 June
Bronze	James Heatly; Grace Reid	Diving	Mixed synchronized 3 metre springboard	29 June

== Artistic swimming ==
Great Britain entered 10 artistic swimmers.

Women

Athlete	Event	Preliminaries		Final	
Athlete	Event	Points	Rank	Points	Rank
Kate Shortman	Solo technical routine	83.8324	7 Q	85.1632	7
Kate Shortman; Isabelle Thorpe	Duet technical routine	84.8081	9 Q	84.9751	9
Kate Shortman; Isabelle Thorpe	Duet free routine	84.9000	11 Q	84.8667	11
Isobel Blinkhorn; Millicent Costello; Isobel Davies; Daniella Lloyd; Kate Shortman; Robyn Swatman; Isabelle Thorpe; Laura Turberville	Team technical routine	82.1773	9 Q	82.5264	9
Isobel Blinkhorn; Millicent Costello; Isobel Davies; Daisy Gunn; Cerys Hughes; Daniella Lloyd; Robyn Swatman; Laura Turberville	Team free routine	82.3667	12 Q	82.8000	12
Isobel Blinkhorn; Millicent Costello; Isobel Davies; Daisy Gunn; Cerys Hughes; Daniella Lloyd; Kate Shortman; Robyn Swatman; Isabelle Thorpe; Laura Turberville	Free routine combination	83.5333	6 Q	84.6333	6

== Diving ==
Great Britain entered 14 divers.

Men

Athlete	Event	Preliminaries		Semifinals		Final	
Athlete	Event	Points	Rank	Points	Rank	Points	Rank
Jordan Houlden	1 m springboard	340.95	18	—N/a		did not advance	
Jordan Houlden	3 m springboard	385.35	11 Q	397.15	7 Q	390.60	9
Jack Laugher	1 m springboard	363.70	9 Q	—N/a		426.95	2nd place, silver medalist(s)
Jack Laugher	3 m springboard	457.80	2 Q	469.65	3 Q	473.30	3rd place, bronze medalist(s)
Matty Lee	10 m platform	410.30	8 Q	448.40	5 Q	426.15	8
Noah Williams	10 m platform	405.00	9 Q	430.05	7 Q	479.05	5
Anthony Harding; Jack Laugher	Synchronized 3 m springboard	413.13	2 Q	—N/a		451.71	2nd place, silver medalist(s)
Matty Lee; Noah Williams	Synchronized 10 metre platform	379.26	3 Q	—N/a		427.71	2nd place, silver medalist(s)

Women

Athlete	Event	Preliminaries		Semifinals		Final	
Athlete	Event	Points	Rank	Points	Rank	Points	Rank
Eden Cheng	10 m platform	231.00	26	did not advance			
Yasmin Harper	1 m springboard	241.50	15	—N/a		did not advance	
Yasmin Harper	3 m springboard	236.90	25	did not advance			
Grace Reid	1 m springboard	254.85	4 Q	—N/a		257.50	6
Grace Reid	3 m springboard	254.00	18 Q	272.00	12 Q	292.90	8
Andrea Spendolini-Sirieix	10 m platform	268.20	19	did not advance			
Desharne Bent-Ashmeil; Amy Rollinson	Synchronized 3 m springboard	247.80	10 Q	—N/a		248.40	9
Robyn Birch; Emily Martin	Synchronized 10 m platform	269.58	7 Q	—N/a		259.20	9

Mixed

Athlete	Event	Preliminaries		Final	
Athlete	Event	Points	Rank	Points	Rank
Andrea Spendolini-Sirieix; James Heatly	Team event	—N/a		357.60	3rd place, bronze medalist(s)
James Heatly; Grace Reid	Synchronized 3 m springboard	—N/a		287.61	3rd place, bronze medalist(s)

== Open water swimming ==
Great Britain entered 2 open water male swimmers

Men

Athlete	Event	Time	Rank
Hector Pardoe	10 km	1:53:41.7	11
Toby Robinson	10 km	1:55:39.2	21

== Swimming ==
Great Britain entered 21 swimmers.

Men

Athlete	Event	Heat		Semifinal		Final	
Athlete	Event	Time	Rank	Time	Rank	Time	Rank
Lewis Burras	50 m freestyle	21.89	6 Q	21.78	4 Q	21.83	7
Lewis Burras	100 m freestyle	48.49	14 Q	47.63 NR	4 Q	48.23	7
Tom Dean	200 m freestyle	1:45.99	4 Q	1:45.48	4 Q	1:44.98	3rd place, bronze medalist(s)
Tom Dean	200 m individual medley	1:59.44	14 Q	1:57.38	6 Q	1:56.77	5
Luke Greenbank	100 m backstroke	53.97	15 Q	53.99	14	did not advance	
Luke Greenbank	200 m backstroke	1:57.33	6 Q	1:56.42	3 Q	1:55.16	2nd place, silver medalist(s)
James Guy	100 m butterfly	51.68	8 Q	51.50	11	did not advance	
James Guy	200 m butterfly	1:56.63	14 Q	1:54.91	8 Q	1:55.54	8
Daniel Jervis	400 m freestyle	3:48.66	14	—N/a		did not advance	
Daniel Jervis	800 m freestyle	7:50.55	10	—N/a		did not advance	
Daniel Jervis	1500 m freestyle	14:56.89	8 Q	—N/a		14:48.86	7
Joe Litchfield	100 m backstroke	55.52	26	did not advance			
Jacob Peters	50 m butterfly	23.62	21	did not advance			
Jacob Peters	100 m butterfly	51.75	10 Q	51.50	11	did not advance	
Ben Proud	50 m freestyle	21.76	4 Q	21.42	1 Q	21.32	1st place, gold medalist(s)
Ben Proud	50 m butterfly	23.08	7 Q	22.76	1 Q	23.08	7
Matt Richards	200 m freestyle	1:48.74	30	did not advance			
Jacob Whittle	100 m freestyle	48.23	7 Q	48.19	12	did not advance	
James Wilby	100 m breaststroke	1:00.14	11 Q	59.23	4 Q	58.93	4
James Wilby	200 m breaststroke	2:11.29	13 Q	2:09.85	10	did not advance	
Brodie Williams	200 m backstroke	1:57.09	4 Q	1:56.17	2 Q	1:56.16	4
Brodie Williams	400 m individual medley	4:13.89	10	—N/a		did not advance	
Lewis Burras; Jacob Whittle); Matt Richards; Tom Dean; James Guy*	4 × 100 m freestyle relay	3:12.55	4 Q	—N/a		3:11.14 NR	4
James Guy; Jacob Whittle; Joe Litchfield; Tom Dean; Matthew Richards*	4 × 200 m freestyle relay	7:09.76	6 Q	—N/a		7:04.00	3rd place, bronze medalist(s)
Luke Greenbank; James Wilby; James Guy; Tom Dean; Jacob Peters*; Lewis Burras*	4 × 100 m medley relay	3:33.56	5 Q	—N/a		3:31.31	3rd place, bronze medalist(s)

Women

Athlete	Event	Heat		Semifinal		Final	
Athlete	Event	Time	Rank	Time	Rank	Time	Rank
Freya Anderson	100 m freestyle	54.40	14 Q	54.19	12	did not advance	
Freya Anderson	200 m freestyle	1:57.53	6 Q	1:56.05	1 Q	1:56.68	4
Freya Anderson	400 m freestyle	4:11.82	14	—N/a		did not advance	
Freya Colbert	200 m freestyle	1:59.48	19	did not advance			
Freya Colbert	400 m freestyle	4:12.82	18	—N/a		did not advance	
Freya Colbert	400 m individual medley	4:45.55	12	—N/a		did not advance	
Medi Harris	50 m backstroke	27.83	6 Q	27.72; 27.56	8 QSO; Q	27.72	7
Medi Harris	100 m backstroke	1:00.03	8 Q	59.61	5 Q	1:00.01	7
Anna Hopkin	50 m freestyle	24.82	6 Q	24.60	5 Q	24.71	7
Anna Hopkin	100 m freestyle	54.08	6 Q	53.92	9	did not advance	
Molly Renshaw	100 m breaststroke	1:06.83	11 Q	1:06.39	7 Q	1:06.60	8
Molly Renshaw	200 m breaststroke	2:25.54	4 Q	2:24.06	6 Q	2:23.92	6
Laura Stephens	100 m butterfly	59.46	16 Q	58.71	15	did not advance	
Laura Stephens	200 m butterfly	2:10.07	10 Q	2:08.47	10	did not advance	
Abbie Wood	200 m breaststroke	2:25.95	9 Q	2:24.46	7 Q	2:26.19	8
Abbie Wood	200 m individual medley	2:10.89	6 Q	2:11.31	12	did not advance	
Anna Hopkin; Abbie Wood; Lucy Hope; Freya Anderson; Medi Harris*	4 × 100 m freestyle relay	3:36.24	4 Q	—N/a		3:35.43	5
Freya Anderson; Medi Harris; Freya Colbert; Lucy Hope	4 × 200 m freestyle relay	7:59.87	8 Q	—N/a		Withdrew	
Medi Harris; Molly Renshaw; Laura Stephens; Lucy Hope	4 × 100 m medley relay	Disqualified		—N/a		did not advance	

Mixed

Athlete	Event	Heat		Final	
Athlete	Event	Time	Rank	Time	Rank
Tom Dean; Lewis Burras; Anna Hopkin; Freya Anderson; Jacob Whittle * Matt Richards * Lucy Hope*	4 × 100 m freestyle relay	3:26.10	6 Q	3:22.44	4
Medi Harris; James Wilby; James Guy; Freya Anderson; Jacob Peters*; Anna Hopkin *	4 × 100 m medley relay	3:43.64	3 Q	3:41.65	4

Legend: (*) = Swimmers who participated in the heat only.
