= Malaysia at the 2022 World Aquatics Championships =

- Flag of Malaysia
- FINA code: MAS
- National federation: Malaysia Swimming Federation
- Website: malaysiaswimming.org

in Budapest, Hungary
- Competitors: 13 in 2 sports
- Medals Ranked 21st: Gold 0 Silver 0 Bronze 2 Total 2

World Aquatics Championships appearances
- 1973; 1975; 1978; 1982; 1986; 1991; 1994; 1998; 2001; 2003; 2005; 2007; 2009; 2011; 2013; 2015; 2017; 2019; 2022; 2023; 2024

Malaysia competed at the 2022 World Aquatics Championships in Budapest, Hungary from 18 June to 3 July.

== Medalists ==
Medal	Name	Sport	Event	Date
Bronze	Pandelela Rinong	Diving	Women's 10 m platform	June 27
Bronze	Nur Dhabitah Sabri; Pandelela Rinong	Diving	Women's 10 m synchronized platform	June 30

== Diving ==
Men

Athlete	Event	Preliminaries		Semifinals		Final	
Athlete	Event	Points	Rank	Points	Rank	Points	Rank
Gabriel Gilbert Daim	1 m springboard	232.55	46	—		Did not advance	
Chew Yiwei	3 m springboard	255.65	51	Did not advance			
Muhammad Syafiq Puteh	3 m springboard	327.35	35	Did not advance			
Jellson Jabillin	10 m platform	353.10	19	Did not advance			
Hanis Nazirul Jaya Surya	10 m platform	317.80	28	Did not advance			
Chew Yiwei; Ooi Tze Liang	Synchronized 3 m springboard	337.23	11 Q	—		337.83	11
Hanis Nazirul Jaya Surya; Jellson Jabillin	Synchronized 10 m platform	311.85	12 Q	—		322.35	11

Women

Athlete	Event	Preliminaries		Semifinals		Final	
Athlete	Event	Points	Rank	Points	Rank	Points	Rank
Ong Ker Ying	1 m springboard	214.60	28	—		Did not advance	
Ong Ker Ying	3 m springboard	186.00	36	Did not advance			
Pandelela Rinong	10 m platform	332.10	4 Q	313.15	7 Q	338.85	3rd place, bronze medalist(s)
Nur Dhabitah Sabri; Ng Yan Yee	Synchronized 3 m springboard	272.97	6 Q	—		282.45	6
Nur Dhabitah Sabri; Pandelela Rinong	Synchronized 10 m platform	270.90	6 Q	—		298.68	3rd place, bronze medalist(s)

Mixed

Athlete	Event	Final	
Athlete	Event	Points	Rank
Muhammad Syafiq Puteh; Ng Yan Yee	Synchronized 3 m springboard	275.46	7
Pandelela Rinong; Ooi Tze Liang	Team event	350.25	5

== Swimming ==
Men

Athlete	Event	Heat		Semifinal		Final	
Athlete	Event	Time	Rank	Time	Rank	Time	Rank
Khiew Hoe Yean	200 m freestyle	1:48:37	27	Did not advance			
Khiew Hoe Yean	400 m freestyle	3:48:72 NR	15	—		Did not advance	
Khiew Hoe Yean	200 m backstroke	2:03:12	24	Did not advance			

Women

Athlete	Event	Heat		Semifinal		Final	
Athlete	Event	Time	Rank	Time	Rank	Time	Rank
Goh Chia Tong	1500 m freestyle	17:33:03	25	—		Did not advance	
Phee Jinq En	50 m breaststroke	DNS		Did not advance			
Phee Jinq En	100 m breaststroke	DNS		Did not advance			
