= Diving at the 2022 World Aquatics Championships =

2022 diving competition

- Host city: Budapest, Hungary
- Date(s): 26 June – 3 July
- Venue(s): Danube Arena
- Events: 13

Diving at the 2022 World Aquatics Championships was held from 26 June to 3 July 2022.

== Events ==
Individual events consisted of preliminaries, semifinals and finals. The order of divers in the preliminary round was determined by computerized random selection, during the technical meeting. The 18 divers with the highest scores in the preliminaries proceeded to the semifinals.

The semifinal consisted of the top 18 ranked divers from the preliminary competition and the final of the top 12 ranked divers from the semifinal.

== Schedule ==
13 events were held.

All time are local (UTC+2).

Date	Time	Event
26 June 2022	09:00	Men's Synchronized 3 metre springboard preliminaries
26 June 2022	12:00	Women's 10 metre platform preliminaries
26 June 2022	16:00	Men's Synchronized 3 metre springboard final
26 June 2022	18:30	Women's 10 metre platform semifinal
27 June 2022	09:00	Men's 3 metre springboard preliminaries
27 June 2022	16:00	Men's 3 metre springboard semifinal
27 June 2022	19:00	Women's 10 metre platform final
28 June 2022	10:00	Men's Synchronized 10 metre platform preliminaries
28 June 2022	16:00	Men's 3 metre springboard final
28 June 2022	19:00	Men's Synchronized 10 metre platform final
29 June 2022	10:00	Women's 1 metre springboard preliminaries
29 June 2022	14:30	Team event
29 June 2022	17:00	Women's 1 metre springboard final
29 June 2022	19:00	Mixed Synchronized 3 metre springboard final
30 June 2022	09:00	Women's Synchronized 10 metre platform preliminaries
30 June 2022	12:00	Men's 1 metre springboard preliminaries
30 June 2022	17:00	Women's Synchronized 10 metre platform final
30 June 2022	19:00	Men's 1 metre springboard final
1 July 2022	10:00	Women's 3 metre springboard preliminaries
1 July 2022	16:00	Women's 3 metre springboard semifinal
1 July 2022	19:00	Mixed Synchronized 10 metre platform final
2 July 2022	10:00	Men's 10 metre platform preliminaries
2 July 2022	16:00	Men's 10 metre platform semifinal
2 July 2022	19:00	Women's 3 metre springboard final
3 July 2022	11:00	Women's Synchronized 3 metre springboard preliminaries
3 July 2022	15:00	Women's Synchronized 3 metre springboard final
3 July 2022	17:00	Men's 10 metre platform final

== Medal summary ==
=== Medal table ===
* Host nation (Hungary)

Rank	Nation	Gold	Silver	Bronze	Total
1	China	13	2	2	17
2	Great Britain	0	3	3	6
3	United States	0	2	1	3
4	Japan	0	2	0	2
5	Canada	0	1	2	3
6	France	0	1	0	1
6	Italy	0	1	0	1
6	Ukraine	0	1	0	1
9	Australia	0	0	2	2
9	Malaysia	0	0	2	2
11	Germany	0	0	1	1
Totals (11 entries)		13	13	13	39

=== Men ===
Event	Gold		Silver		Bronze	
1 metre springboard	Wang Zongyuan; China	493.30	Jack Laugher; Great Britain	426.95	Li Shixin; Australia	395.40
3 metre springboard	Wang Zongyuan; China	561.95	Cao Yuan; China	492.85	Jack Laugher; Great Britain	473.30
10 metre platform	Yang Jian; China	515.55	Rikuto Tamai; Japan	488.00	Yang Hao; China	485.45
Synchronized; 3 metre springboard	China; Cao Yuan; Wang Zongyuan	459.18	Great Britain; Anthony Harding; Jack Laugher	451.71	Germany; Timo Barthel; Lars Rüdiger	406.44
Synchronized; 10 metre platform	China; Yang Hao; Lian Junjie	467.79	Great Britain; Matty Lee; Noah Williams	427.71	Canada; Rylan Wiens; Nathan Zsombor-Murray	417.12

=== Women ===
Event	Gold		Silver		Bronze	
1 metre springboard	Li Yajie; China	300.85	Sarah Bacon; United States	276.65	Mia Vallée; Canada	276.60
3 metre springboard	Chen Yiwen; China	366.90	Mia Vallée; Canada	329.00	Chang Yani; China	325.85
10 metre platform	Chen Yuxi; China	417.25	Quan Hongchan; China	416.95	Pandelela Rinong; Malaysia	338.58
Synchronized; 3 metre springboard	China; Chang Yani; Chen Yiwen	343.14	Japan; Rin Kaneto; Sayaka Mikami	303.00	Australia; Maddison Keeney; Anabelle Smith	294.12
Synchronized; 10 metre platform	China; Chen Yuxi; Quan Hongchan	368.40	United States; Delaney Schnell; Katrina Young	299.40	Malaysia; Nur Dhabitah Sabri; Pandelela Rinong	298.68

=== Mixed ===
Event	Gold		Silver		Bronze	
3 metre springboard	China; Zhu Zifeng; Lin Shan	324.15	Italy; Matteo Santoro; Chiara Pellacani	293.55	Great Britain; James Heatly; Grace Reid	287.61
10 metre platform	China; Duan Yu; Ren Qian	341.16	Ukraine; Sofiya Lyskun; Oleksii Sereda	317.01	United States; Delaney Schnell; Carson Tyler	315.90
Team	China; Quan Hongchan; Bai Yuming	391.40	France; Jade Gillet; Alexis Jandard	358.50	Great Britain; Andrea Spendolini-Sirieix; James Heatly	357.60
