= Brazil at the 2022 World Aquatics Championships =

- Flag of Brazil
- World Aquatics code: BRA
- National federation: Brazilian Confederation of Water Sports
- Website: cbda.org.br (in Portuguese)

in Budapest, Hungary
- Competitors: 71 in 6 sports
- Medals Ranked 12th: Gold 2 Silver 1 Bronze 2 Total 5

World Aquatics Championships appearances (overview)
- 1973; 1975; 1978; 1982; 1986; 1991; 1994; 1998; 2001; 2003; 2005; 2007; 2009; 2011; 2013; 2015; 2017; 2019; 2022; 2023; 2024; 2025

Brazil competed at the 2022 World Aquatics Championships in Budapest, Hungary from 17 June to 3 July 2022.

== Medalists ==
Medal	Name	Sport	Event	Date
Gold	Ana Marcela Cunha	Open water swimming	Women's 5 km	June 27
Gold	Ana Marcela Cunha	Open water swimming	Women's 25 km	June 30
Silver	Nicholas Santos	Swimming	Men's 50 metre butterfly	June 23
Bronze	Guilherme Costa	Swimming	Men's 400 metre freestyle	June 18
Bronze	Ana Marcela Cunha	Open water swimming	Women's 10 km	June 29

== Artistic swimming ==
Women

Athlete	Event	Preliminaries		Final	
Athlete	Event	Points	Rank	Points	Rank
Jullia Catharino; Laura Miccuci	Duet technical routine	78.4679	15	Did not advance	
Laura Miccuci; Anna Veloso	Duet free routine	78.8667	18	Did not advance	
Vitoria Casale; Jullia Catharino; Rafaela Garcia; Luiza Lopes; Laura Miccuci; Celina Rangel; Gabriela Regly; Anna Veloso	Team technical routine	78.4964	12 Q	79.2419	12
Vitoria Casale; Jullia Catharino; Rafaela Garcia; Luiza Lopes; Laura Miccuci; Celina Rangel; Gabriela Regly; Anna Veloso	Team free routine	78.8333	14	Did not advance	
Vitoria Casale; Jullia Catharino; Rafaela Garcia; Luiza Lopes; Laura Miccuci; Ana Beatriz Nunes; Celina Rangel; Gabriela Regly; Luiza Rodrigues; Anna Veloso	Free routine combination	78.7333	8 Q	80.3333	9
Vitoria Casale; Jullia Catharino; Rafaela Garcia; Luiza Lopes; Laura Miccuci; Ana Beatriz Nunes; Celina Rangel; Gabriela Regly; Luiza Rodrigues; Anna Veloso	Highlight routine	81.2000	9 Q	81.6667	9

Mixed

Athlete	Event	Preliminaries		Final	
Athlete	Event	Points	Rank	Points	Rank
Fabiano Ferreira; Gabriela Regly	Duet technical routine	73.2235	9 Q	74.8994	9
Fabiano Ferreira; Gabriela Regly	Duet free routine	77.2333	8 Q	78.7667	8

== Diving ==
Men

Athlete	Event	Preliminaries		Semifinals		Final	
Athlete	Event	Points	Rank	Points	Rank	Points	Rank
Rafael Fogaça	1 m springboard	288.65	35	—N/a		Did not advance	
Rafael Fogaça	3 m springboard	397.30	7 Q	383.35	10 Q	365.40	10
Kawan Pereira	10 m platform	350.50	20	Did not advance			
Isaac Souza	10 m platform	356.30	18 Q	365.20	15	Did not advance	
Kawan Pereira; Isaac Souza	10 m synchronized platform	354.45	7 Q	—N/a		329.79	9

Women

Athlete	Event	Preliminaries		Semifinals		Final	
Athlete	Event	Points	Rank	Points	Rank	Points	Rank
Luana Lira	1 m springboard	198.20	35	—N/a		Did not advance	
Luana Lira	3 m springboard	281.20	11 Q	270.15	14	Did not advance	
Ingrid Oliveira	10 m platform	340.70	3 Q	334.30	4 Q	327.10	4
Anna dos Santos	1 m springboard	220.25	25	—N/a		Did not advance	
Anna dos Santos	3 m springboard	219.70	30	Did not advance			
Luana Lira; Anna dos Santos	3 m synchronized springboard	248.40	9 Q	—N/a		245.94	10

Mixed

Athlete	Event	Points	Rank
Rafael Fogaça; Anna dos Santos	3 m synchronized springboard	234.60	12
Rafael Fogaça; Ingrid Oliveira	Team	348.45	6

== Open water swimming ==
Men

Athlete	Event	Time	Rank
Bruce Almeida	Men's 5 km	56:27.7	21
Bruce Almeida	Men's 10 km	1:56:09.0	25
Bruce Almeida	Men's 25 km	DNF	
Gabriel Azevedo	Men's 5 km	56:28.4	22
Guilherme Costa	Men's 10 km	DNF	

Women

Athlete	Event	Time	Rank
Ana Marcela Cunha	Women's 5 km	57:52.9	1st place, gold medalist(s)
Ana Marcela Cunha	Women's 10 km	2:02:30.7	3rd place, bronze medalist(s)
Ana Marcela Cunha	Women's 25 km	5:24:15.0	1st place, gold medalist(s)
Cibelle Jungblut	Women's 25 km	5:52:41.6	13
Viviane Jungblut	Women's 5 km	58:00.5	7
Viviane Jungblut	Women's 10 km	2:03:04.9	16

Mixed

Athlete	Event	Time	Rank
Cibelle Jungblut; Viviane Jungblut; Bruce Almeida; Guilherme Costa	Team	1:05:29.1	5

== Swimming ==
Men

Athlete	Event	Heat		Semifinal		Final	
Athlete	Event	Time	Rank	Time	Rank	Time	Rank
Bruno Fratus	50 m freestyle	21.71	1 Q	21.83; SO: 21.62	9	Did not advance	
Luiz Gustavo Borges	50 m freestyle	22.26	20	Did not advance			
Marcelo Chierighini	100 m freestyle	48.97	26	Did not advance			
Gabriel Santos	100 m freestyle	48.89	25	Did not advance			
Breno Correia	200 m freestyle	1:47.79	22	Did not advance			
Fernando Scheffer	200 m freestyle	1:46.71	9	1:46.11	9	Did not advance	
Guilherme Costa	400 m freestyle	3:44.52	3 Q	—N/a		3:43.31 SA	3rd place, bronze medalist(s)
Guilherme Costa	800 m freestyle	7:46.90	7 Q	—N/a		7:45.48 SA	5
Guilherme Costa	1500 m freestyle	14:53.03	4 Q	—N/a		14:48.53 SA	6
Guilherme Basseto	50 m backstroke	25.15	15 Q	24.85	10	Did not advance	
Guilherme Basseto	100 m backstroke	54.26	17	Did not advance			
João Gomes Júnior	50 m breaststroke	26.75	3 Q	DSQ		Did not advance	
Felipe França Silva	50 m breaststroke	27.22	9 Q	27.20	8 Q	27.42	8
Felipe França Silva	100 m breaststroke	1:01.41	24	Did not advance			
Caio Pumputis	200 m breaststroke	2:12.72	19	Did not advance			
Caio Pumputis	200 m individual medley	DSQ		Did not advance			
Nicholas Santos	50 m butterfly	23.46	13 Q	23.04	8 Q	22.78	2nd place, silver medalist(s)
Vinicius Lanza	50 m butterfly	24.26	41	Did not advance			
Vinicius Lanza	100 m butterfly	52.78	=25	Did not advance			
Vinicius Lanza	200 m individual medley	2:01.84	23	Did not advance			
Matheus Gonche	100 m butterfly	52.27	18	Did not advance			
Matheus Gonche	200 m butterfly	2:01.65	33	Did not advance			
Leonardo de Deus	200 m butterfly	1:56.35	10 Q	1:56.18	14	Did not advance	
Stephan Steverink	400 m individual medley	4:19.09	16	—N/a		Did not advance	
Gabriel Santos; Marcelo Chierighini; Felipe Souza; Vinicius Assunção	4 × 100 m freestyle relay	3:13.76	7 Q	—N/a		3:12.21	7
Fernando Scheffer; Vinicius Assunção; Murilo Sartori; Breno Correia	4 × 200 m freestyle relay	7:06.98	2 Q	—N/a		7:04.69 SA	4
Guilherme Basseto; João Gomes Júnior; Matheus Gonche; Luiz Gustavo Borges	4 × 100 m medley relay	3:34.66	10	—N/a		Did not advance	

Women

Athlete	Event	Heat		Semifinal		Final	
Athlete	Event	Time	Rank	Time	Rank	Time	Rank
Lorrane Ferreira	50 m freestyle	25.36	17 Q	25.24	15	Did not advance	
Stephanie Balduccini	100 m freestyle	54.48	15 Q	54.10	10	Did not advance	
Stephanie Balduccini	200 m freestyle	1:57.81	8 Q	1:57.54	12	Did not advance	
Stephanie Balduccini	200 m individual medley	2:14.61	19	Did not advance			
Gabrielle Roncatto	400 m freestyle	4:12.09	16	—N/a		Did not advance	
Gabrielle Roncatto	800 m freestyle	8:38.65	13	—N/a		Did not advance	
Gabrielle Roncatto	400 m individual medley	4:52.61	14	—N/a		Did not advance	
Viviane Jungblut	800 m freestyle	8:32.26	9 Q	—N/a		8:37.04	8
Viviane Jungblut	1500 m freestyle	16:09.27	7 Q	—N/a		16:13.89	7
Beatriz Dizotti	1500 m freestyle	16:08.35	6 Q	—N/a		16:05.25 NR	6
Jhennifer Conceição	50 m breaststroke	30.53	6 Q	30.28 SA	6 Q	30.45	8
Jhennifer Conceição	100 m breaststroke	1:07.40	17 Q	Did not advance			
Giovanna Diamante	50 m butterfly	26.75	22	Did not advance			
Giovanna Diamante	100 m butterfly	57.87	8 Q	57.94	10	Did not advance	
Giovanna Diamante	200 m butterfly	2:12.39	18	Did not advance			
Ana Carolina Vieira; Stephanie Balduccini; Giovanna Diamante; Giovana Medeiros	4 × 100 m freestyle relay	3:38.04	7 Q	—N/a		3:38.10	6
Stephanie Balduccini; Giovanna Diamante; Aline Rodrigues; Maria Paula Heitmann	4 × 200 m freestyle relay	7:57.93	6 Q	—N/a		7:58.38	6
Stephanie Balduccini; Jhennifer Conceição; Giovanna Diamante; Ana Carolina Vieira	4 × 100 m medley relay	4:04.59	10	—N/a		Did not advance	

Mixed

Athlete	Event	Heat		Final	
Athlete	Event	Time	Rank	Time	Rank
Vinicius Assunção; Gabriel Santos; Stephanie Balduccini; Giovanna Diamante	4 × 100 m freestyle relay	3:26.31	7 Q	3:24.78 SA	6
Guilherme Basseto; João Gomes Júnior; Giovanna Diamante; Stephanie Balduccini	4 × 100 m medley relay	3:48.07	9	Did not advance	

== Water polo ==
Summary

Team	Event	Group stage				Playoff	Quarterfinal	Semifinal	Final / BM	
Team	Event	Opposition Score	Opposition Score	Opposition Score	Rank	Opposition Score	Opposition Score	Opposition Score	Opposition Score	Rank
Brazil	Men's tournament	Georgia; L 10–14	Hungary; L 6–20	Montenegro; L 5–20	4	—N/a	—N/a	Germany; L 9–10	—N/a	15
Brazil	Women's tournament	New Zealand; L 8–12	Kazakhstan; L 6–10	Australia; L 5–17	4	—N/a	—N/a	Thailand; W 12–9	South Africa; L 7–8	14

=== Men's tournament ===
Team roster

The following is Brazilian roster in the Water polo at the 2022 World Aquatics Championships – Men's tournament.

Head coach: (Cuba) Bárbaro Díaz

- 1 Guilherme Barrella GK
- 2 Logan Cabral CB
- 3 Filipe Lacerda CB
- 4 Gustavo Coutinho D
- 5 Roberto Freitas D
- 6 Marcos Paulo Pedroso CF
- 7 Rafael Real D
- 8 Eduardo De Paula D
- 9 Bruno Chiappini CB
- 10 Italo Vizacre D
- 11 Gustavo Guimarães D
- 12 Luis Ricardo Silva CF
- 13 Alexandre Mendes GK

Group play

Pos	Team	Pld	W	D	L	GF	GA	GD	Pts	Qualification
1	Hungary (H)	3	3	0	0	50	28	+22	6	Quarterfinals
2	Montenegro	3	2	0	1	38	26	+12	4	Playoffs
3	Georgia	3	1	0	2	37	38	−1	2	Playoffs
4	Brazil	3	0	0	3	21	54	−33	0	

Source: Sportresult
Rules for classification: 1) points; 2) head-to-head points; 3) head-to-head goal difference; 4) head-to-head number of goals scored; 5) Goal difference.
(H) Hosts

21 June 2022; 19:30	Report	Brazil	10–14	Georgia	Alfréd Hajós National Swimming Stadium, Budapest; Referees: Maro Savinović (CRO), Dion Willis (RSA)
21 June 2022; 19:30	Report	Score by quarters: 2–2, 3–3, 3–6, 2–3			Alfréd Hajós National Swimming Stadium, Budapest; Referees: Maro Savinović (CRO), Dion Willis (RSA)
21 June 2022; 19:30	Report	Freitas 4	Goals	Sarić, Vapenski 4	Alfréd Hajós National Swimming Stadium, Budapest; Referees: Maro Savinović (CRO), Dion Willis (RSA)

23 June 2022; 21:00	Report	Hungary	20–6	Brazil	Alfréd Hajós National Swimming Stadium, Budapest; Referees: Andrew Carney (AUS), Frank Ohme (GER)
23 June 2022; 21:00	Report	Score by quarters: 7–1, 4–2, 3–1, 6–2			Alfréd Hajós National Swimming Stadium, Budapest; Referees: Andrew Carney (AUS), Frank Ohme (GER)
23 June 2022; 21:00	Report	three players 3	Goals	Real 2	Alfréd Hajós National Swimming Stadium, Budapest; Referees: Andrew Carney (AUS), Frank Ohme (GER)

25 June 2022; 19:30	Report	Brazil	5–20	Montenegro	Alfréd Hajós National Swimming Stadium, Budapest; Referees: Andrew Carney (AUS), Frank Ohme (GER)
25 June 2022; 19:30	Report	Score by quarters: 0–4, 2–6, 0–7, 3–3			Alfréd Hajós National Swimming Stadium, Budapest; Referees: Andrew Carney (AUS), Frank Ohme (GER)
25 June 2022; 19:30	Report	five players 1	Goals	three players 3	Alfréd Hajós National Swimming Stadium, Budapest; Referees: Andrew Carney (AUS), Frank Ohme (GER)

13–15th place semifinal

27 June 2022; 17:00	Report	Brazil	9–10	Germany	Szeged Tiszavirág Pool, Szeged; Referees: Radu Matache (ROU), Levan Bertishvili (GEO)
27 June 2022; 17:00	Report	Score by quarters: 2–2, 3–2, 3–3, 1–3			Szeged Tiszavirág Pool, Szeged; Referees: Radu Matache (ROU), Levan Bertishvili (GEO)
27 June 2022; 17:00	Report	Coutinho 3	Goals	Küppers, Strelezkij 3	Szeged Tiszavirág Pool, Szeged; Referees: Radu Matache (ROU), Levan Bertishvili (GEO)

=== Women's tournament ===
Team roster

The following is Brazilian roster in the Water polo at the 2022 World Aquatics Championships – Women's tournament.

Head coach: Frank Diaz

- 1 Thatiana Pregolini GK
- 2 Alissa Pinciroli D
- 3 Mariane Cosmo CF
- 4 Kemily Leão D
- 5 Jennifer Cavalcante CF
- 6 Marcela Marrani D
- 7 Samantha Ferreira D
- 8 Luana Quinn CB
- 9 Letícia Belorio D
- 10 Rebecca Moreir CB
- 11 Mirella Coutinho D
- 12 Ana Julia Amaral D
- 13 Isabela Mendes GK

Group play

Pos	Team	Pld	W	D	L	GF	GA	GD	Pts	Qualification
1	Australia	3	3	0	0	47	13	+34	6	Quarterfinals
2	New Zealand	3	2	0	1	29	30	−1	4	Playoffs
3	Kazakhstan	3	1	0	2	27	40	−13	2	Playoffs
4	Brazil	3	0	0	3	19	39	−20	0	

Source: Sportresult
Rules for classification: 1) points; 2) head-to-head points; 3) head-to-head goal difference; 4) head-to-head number of goals scored; 5) Goal difference.

20 June 2022; 18:00	Report	New Zealand	12–8	Brazil	Sopron Lőver Pool, Sopron; Referees: Radu Matache (ROU), Agustin Pinski (ARG)
20 June 2022; 18:00	Report	Score by quarters: 3–3, 5–2, 3–3, 1–0			Sopron Lőver Pool, Sopron; Referees: Radu Matache (ROU), Agustin Pinski (ARG)
20 June 2022; 18:00	Report	McDowall 4	Goals	Leão 3	Sopron Lőver Pool, Sopron; Referees: Radu Matache (ROU), Agustin Pinski (ARG)

22 June 2022; 19:30	Report	Brazil	6–10	Kazakhstan	Sopron Lőver Pool, Sopron; Referees: Radu Matache (ROU), Georgios Stavridis (GRE)
22 June 2022; 19:30	Report	Score by quarters: 2–3, 2–2, 1–1, 1–4			Sopron Lőver Pool, Sopron; Referees: Radu Matache (ROU), Georgios Stavridis (GRE)
22 June 2022; 19:30	Report	Coutinho 2	Goals	Turova, Yeremina 3	Sopron Lőver Pool, Sopron; Referees: Radu Matache (ROU), Georgios Stavridis (GRE)

24 June 2022; 18:00	Report	Brazil	5–17	Australia	Sopron Lőver Pool, Sopron; Referees: György Kun (HUN), Asumi Tsuzaki (JPN)
24 June 2022; 18:00	Report	Score by quarters: 1–5, 0–4, 1–5, 3–3			Sopron Lőver Pool, Sopron; Referees: György Kun (HUN), Asumi Tsuzaki (JPN)
24 June 2022; 18:00	Report	Belorio 2	Goals	Halligan 5	Sopron Lőver Pool, Sopron; Referees: György Kun (HUN), Asumi Tsuzaki (JPN)

13–16th place semifinal

26 June 2022; 18:30	Report	Brazil	12–9	Thailand	Szeged Tiszavirag Pool, Szeged; Referees: Megan Perry (NZL), Anbar Anbar (KUW)
26 June 2022; 18:30	Report	Score by quarters: 4–1, 4–1, 3–3, 1–4			Szeged Tiszavirag Pool, Szeged; Referees: Megan Perry (NZL), Anbar Anbar (KUW)
26 June 2022; 18:30	Report	Ferreira 6	Goals	Puangton, Turon 4	Szeged Tiszavirag Pool, Szeged; Referees: Megan Perry (NZL), Anbar Anbar (KUW)

13th place game

28 June 2022; 15:30	Report	South Africa	8–7	Brazil	Szeged Tiszavirag Pool, Szeged; Referees: Megan Perry (NZL), Veselin Mišković (MNE)
28 June 2022; 15:30	Report	Score by quarters: 2–2, 3–3, 0–1, 3–1			Szeged Tiszavirag Pool, Szeged; Referees: Megan Perry (NZL), Veselin Mišković (MNE)
28 June 2022; 15:30	Report	January 2	Goals	Coutinho 3	Szeged Tiszavirag Pool, Szeged; Referees: Megan Perry (NZL), Veselin Mišković (MNE)
