= Brazil at the 2023 World Aquatics Championships =

- Flag of Brazil
- World Aquatics code: BRA
- National federation: Brazilian Confederation of Aquatic Sports
- Website: cbda.org.br (in Portuguese)

in Fukuoka, Japan
- Competitors: 41 in 5 sports
- Medals Ranked 26th: Gold 0 Silver 0 Bronze 1 Total 1

World Aquatics Championships appearances (overview)
- 1973; 1975; 1978; 1982; 1986; 1991; 1994; 1998; 2001; 2003; 2005; 2007; 2009; 2011; 2013; 2015; 2017; 2019; 2022; 2023; 2024; 2025

Brazil competed at the 2023 World Aquatics Championships in Fukuoka, Japan from 14 to 30 July.

== Medalists ==
Medal	Name	Sport	Event	Date
Bronze	Ana Marcela Cunha	Open water swimming	Women's 5 km	July 18

== Athletes by discipline ==
The following is the list of number of competitors participating at the Championships per discipline.

Sport	Men	Women	Total
Artistic swimming	0	2	2
Diving	4	3	7
High diving	0	1	1
Open water swimming	4	2*	6*
Swimming	13	13*	26*
Total	21	20	41

- Viviane Jungblut was compete in both open water swimming and indoor swimming.

== Artistic swimming ==
Brazil entered 2 artistic swimmers.

Women

Athlete	Event	Preliminaries		Final	
Athlete	Event	Points	Rank	Points	Rank
Laura Miccuci; Gabriela Regly	Duet technical routine	203.9234	15	did not advance	
Laura Miccuci; Gabriela Regly	Duet free routine	165.2500	16	did not advance	

== Diving ==
Brazil entered 7 divers.

Men

Athlete	Event	Preliminaries		Semifinals		Final	
Athlete	Event	Points	Rank	Points	Rank	Points	Rank
Rafael Fogaça	1 m springboard	311.35	27	—		Did not advance	
Rafael Fogaça	3 m springboard	365.55	25	Did not advance			
Rafael Max	1 m springboard	285.65	40	—		Did not advance	
Rafael Max	3 m springboard	346.70	37	Did not advance			
Diogo Silva	10 m platform	420.15	27	Did not advance			
Isaac Souza	10 m platform	420.15	7 Q	418.95	11 Q	447.50	9
Rafael Fogaça; Rafael Max	3 m synchro springboard	301.68	22	—		Did not advance	
Diogo Silva; Isaac Souza	10 m synchro platform	345.30	14	—		Did not advance	

Women

Athlete	Event	Preliminaries		Semifinals		Final	
Athlete	Event	Points	Rank	Points	Rank	Points	Rank
Luana Lira	1 m springboard	224.35	26	—		Did not advance	
Luana Lira	3 m springboard	Did not finish					
Ingrid Oliveira	10 m platform	298.50	11 Q	313.90	8 Q	272.00	12
Anna Santos	1 m springboard	226.45	23	—		Did not advance	
Anna Santos	3 m springboard	251.60	30	Did not advance			
Luana Lira; Anna Santos	3 m synchro springboard	240.00	13	—		Did not advance	

Mixed

Athlete	Event	Final	
Athlete	Event	Points	Rank
Anna Santos; Rafael Max	3 m synchro springboard	239.40	14
Luana Lira; Ingrid Oliveira; Isaac Souza; Rafael Fogaça	Team event	298.70	11

== High diving ==
Brazil entered 1 high diver.

Athlete	Event	Points	Rank
Patrícia Valente	Women's high diving	264.20	8

== Open water swimming ==
Brazil entered 6 open water swimmers.

Men

Athlete	Event	Time	Rank
Bruce Almeida	Men's 5 km	57:48.2	32
Alexandre Finco	Men's 10 km	1:55:32.5	33
Thiago Ruffini	Men's 5 km	57:47.3	31
Diogo Villarinho	Men's 10 km	1:54:12.2	27

Women

Athlete	Event	Time	Rank
Ana Marcela Cunha	Women's 5 km	59:33.9	3rd place, bronze medalist(s)
Ana Marcela Cunha	Women's 10 km	2:02:42.5	5
Viviane Jungblut	Women's 5 km	59:38.2	6
Viviane Jungblut	Women's 10 km	2:05:05.8	26

Mixed

Athlete	Event	Time	Rank
Ana Marcela Cunha; Alexandre Finco; Viviane Jungblut; Diogo Villarinho	Team relay	1:13:07.4	6

== Swimming ==
Brazil entered 26 swimmers.

Men

Athlete	Event	Heat		Semifinal		Final	
Athlete	Event	Time	Rank	Time	Rank	Time	Rank
Guilherme Caribé Santos	50 m freestyle	Disqualified		Did not advance			
Guilherme Caribé Santos	100 m freestyle	48.34	16 Q	48.18	12	Did not advance	
Marcelo Chierighini	50 m freestyle	22.26	28	Did not advance			
Marcelo Chierighini	100 m freestyle	Did not start					
Fernando Scheffer	200 m freestyle	1:46.45	9 Q	1:47.35	16	Did not advance	
Guilherme Costa	400 m freestyle	3:44.17	3 Q	—		3:43.58	4
Guilherme Costa	800 m freestyle	7:45.80	8 Q	—		7:47.26	7
Guilherme Basseto	50 m backstroke	25.22	21	Did not advance			
Guilherme Basseto	100 m backstroke	54.45	23	Did not advance			
João Gomes Júnior	50 m breaststroke	26.81	5 Q	26.90	5 Q	26.97	7
João Gomes Júnior	100 m breaststroke	1:00.12	14 Q	1:00.04	15	Did not advance	
Kayky Mota	50 m butterfly	23.85	39	Did not advance			
Kayky Mota	100 m butterfly	51.47	8 Q	51.43	10	Did not advance	
Leonardo de Deus	200 m butterfly	1:56.79	17 Q	1:57.94	16	Did not advance	
Stephan Steverink	400 m medley	4:21.22	16	—		Did not advance	
Marcelo Chierighini; Guilherme Caribé Santos; Felipe Ribeiro; Victor Alcará	4 × 100 m freestyle relay	3:13.82	7 Q	—		3:12.71	6
Murilo Sartori; Guilherme Costa; Fernando Scheffer; Luiz Altamir Melo	4 × 200 m freestyle relay	7:07.74	8 Q	—		7:06.43	8
Guilherme Basseto; João Gomes Júnior; Kayky Mota; Marcelo Chierighini	4 × 100 m medley relay	Disqualified		—		Did not advance	

Women

Athlete	Event	Heat		Semifinal		Final	
Athlete	Event	Time	Rank	Time	Rank	Time	Rank
Stephanie Balduccini	50 m freestyle	25.40	25	Did not advance			
Stephanie Balduccini	100 m freestyle	54.15	9 Q	54.69	13	Did not advance	
Stephanie Balduccini	200 m freestyle	1:59.55	26	Did not advance			
Maria Fernanda Costa	200 m freestyle	1:58.67	20	Did not advance			
Maria Fernanda Costa	400 m freestyle	4:08.67	12	—		Did not advance	
Maria Fernanda Costa	200 m butterfly	2:13.30	24	Did not advance			
Gabrielle Roncatto	400 m freestyle	4:07.99	11	—		Did not advance	
Gabrielle Roncatto	800 m freestyle	8:48.36	27	—		Did not advance	
Gabrielle Roncatto	400 m medley	4:49.73	27	—		Did not advance	
Beatriz Dizotti	800 m freestyle	8:32.42	13	—		Did not advance	
Beatriz Dizotti	1500 m freestyle	16:01.95 NR	8 Q	—		16:03.70	7
Viviane Jungblut	1500 m freestyle	16:30.99	21	—		Did not advance	
Julia Góes	50 m backstroke	29.09	34	Did not advance			
Julia Góes	100 m backstroke	1:02.87	36	Did not advance			
Jhennifer Conceição	50 m breaststroke	31.04	23	Did not advance			
Jhennifer Conceição	100 m breaststroke	1:08.79	31	Did not advance			
Gabrielle Assis	200 m breaststroke	2:25.18 NR	7 Q	2:25.56	12	Did not advance	
Celine Souza Bispo	50 m butterfly	23.55	22	Did not advance			
Giovanna Diamante	100 m butterfly	59.39	23	Did not advance			
Bruna Monteiro Leme	200 m medley	2:15.65	25	Did not advance			
Ana Carolina Vieira; Stephanie Balduccini; Celine Souza Bispo; Giovanna Diamante	4 × 100 m freestyle relay	3:38.99	11	—		Did not advance	
Stephanie Balduccini; Maria Fernanda Costa; Gabrielle Roncatto; Nathália Almeida	4 × 200 m freestyle relay	7:56.14	8 Q	—		7:59.10	8
Julia Góes; Jhennifer Conceição; Giovanna Diamante; Stephanie Balduccini	4 × 100 m medley relay	4:05.86	21	—		Did not advance	

Mixed

Athlete	Event	Heat		Final	
Athlete	Event	Time	Rank	Time	Rank
Guilherme Caribé Santos; Felipe Ribeiro; Ana Carolina Vieira; Stephanie Balduccini	4 × 100 m freestyle relay	3:26.48	7 Q	3:25.21	6
Guilherme Basseto; Jhennifer Conceição; Kayky Mota; Stephanie Balduccini	4 × 100 m medley relay	3:48.00	16	Did not advance	
