= Swimming at the 2023 Pan American Games =

- Swimming pictograms
- Venue: Aquatic Center; Laguna Los Morros
- Start date: October 21, 2023
- End date: October 29, 2023
- No. of events: 36 (17 men, 17 women, 2 mixed)

Swimming competitions at the 2023 Pan American Games in Santiago, Chile were held between October 21 and 29, 2023 at the Aquatic Center (pool events) in Santiago, Chile, while the open water events took place at the Laguna Los Morros in San Bernado.

== Events ==
Similar to the program's format in 2019, swimming featured a total of 36 events (17 each for men and women and 2 mixed), including two 10 km open-water marathons. The following events were contested (all pool events are long course, and distances are in metres):

- Freestyle: 50, 100, 200, 400, 800, and 1,500;
- Backstroke: 100 and 200;
- Breaststroke: 100 and 200;
- Butterfly: 100 and 200;
- Individual medley: 200 and 400;
- Relays: 4 × 100 free (including mixed), 4 × 200 free, 4 × 100 medley (including mixed)
- Marathon: 10 kilometres

== Qualification ==
A total of up to 374 swimmers will qualify in the pool and a total of up to 40 open water swimmers will qualify. As Host Country, Chile automatically will qualify 18 male and 18 female competitors in the pool and two open water swimmers in each event.

== Medal summary ==
=== Medal table ===
* Host nation (Chile)

Rank	Nation	Gold	Silver	Bronze	Total
1	United States	21	17	10	48
2	Canada	11	6	8	25
3	Brazil	7	8	12	27
4	Mexico	0	2	4	6
5	Argentina	0	2	1	3
5	Venezuela	0	2	1	3
7	Chile*	0	1	0	1
8	Bahamas	0	0	1	1
Totals (8 entries)		39	38	37	114

=== Medalists ===
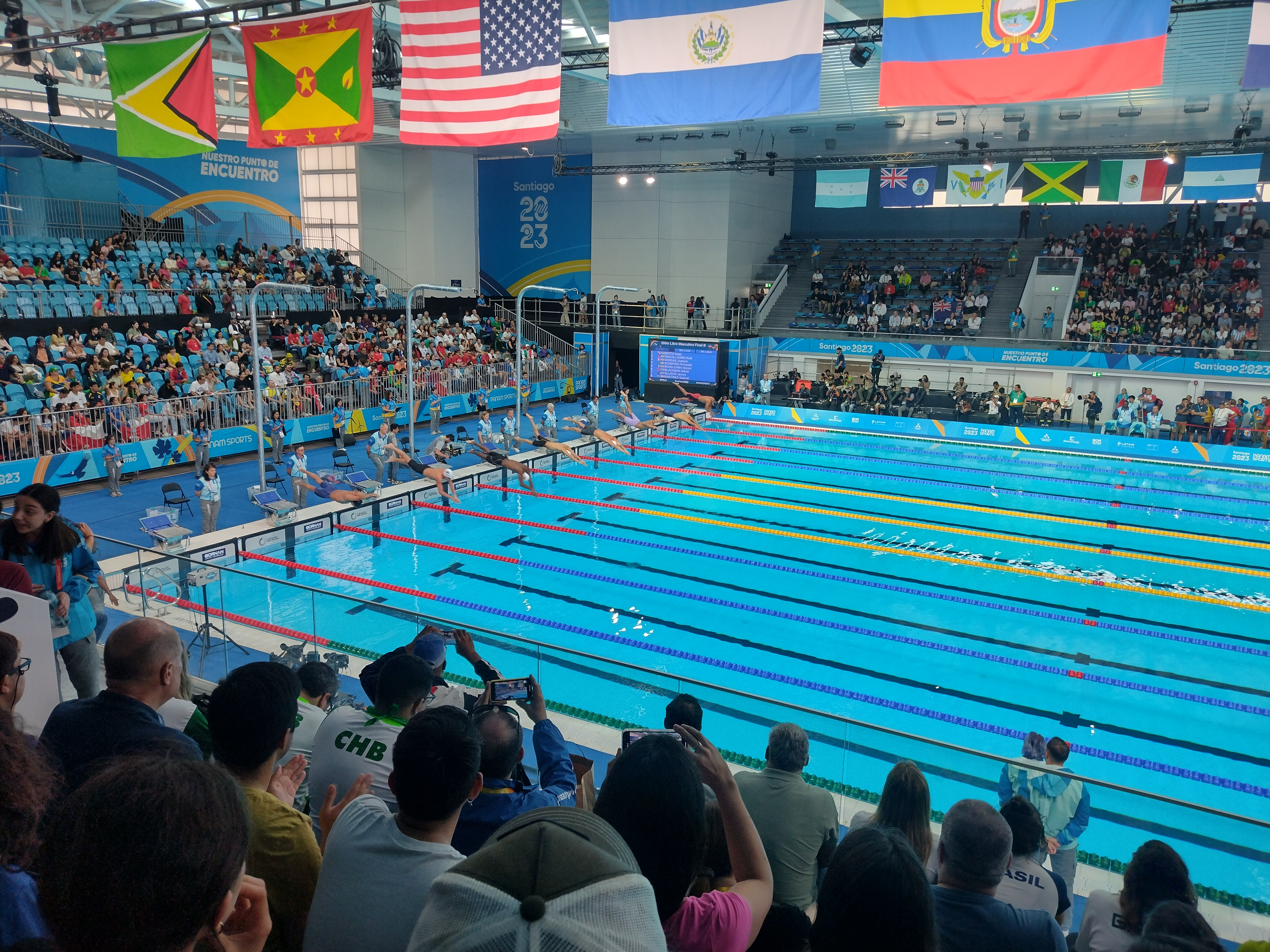
The swimming venue during the competition

==== Men's events ====
Event	Gold		Silver		Bronze	
50 m freestyle	David Curtiss; United States	21.85	Jonny Kulow; United States	21.90	Lamar Taylor; Bahamas	22.13
100 m freestyle	Guilherme Caribé; Brazil	48.06	Brooks Curry; United States	48.38	Not awarded	
100 m freestyle	Guilherme Caribé; Brazil	48.06	Jonny Kulow; United States	48.38	Not awarded	
200 m freestyle	Coby Carrozza; United States	1:47.37	Jorge Iga; Mexico	1:47.56	Murilo Sartori; Brazil	1:47.95
400 m freestyle	Guilherme Costa; Brazil	3:46.79 GR	Alfonso Mestre; Venezuela	3:47.62	James Plage; United States	3:50.74
800 m freestyle	Guilherme Costa; Brazil	7:53.01 GR	Alfonso Mestre; Venezuela	7:54.46	Will Gallant; United States	7:58.96
1500 m freestyle	Guilherme Costa; Brazil	15:09.29	Will Gallant; United States	15:12.94	Alfonso Mestre; Venezuela	15:19.60
100 m backstroke	Adam Chaney; United States	54.20	Ulises Saravia; Argentina	54.23	Blake Tierney; Canada	54.25
200 m backstroke	Jack Aikins; United States	1:56.58 GR	Ian Grum; United States	1:57.19	Hugh McNeill; Canada	1:59.96
100 m breaststroke	Jacob Foster; United States	59.99	Noah Nichols; United States	1:00.43	Miguel de Lara; Mexico	1:00.90
200 m breaststroke	Jacob Foster; United States	2:10.71	Brayden Taivassalo; Canada	2:10.89	Andrés Puente; Mexico	2:11.99
100 m butterfly	Lukas Miller; United States	51.98	Vinicius Lanza; Brazil	52.52	Arsenio Bustos; United States	52.60
200 m butterfly	Mason Laur; United States	1:56.44	Leonardo de Deus; Brazil	1:57.25	Jack Dahlgren; United States	1:57.53
200 m individual medley	Finlay Knox; Canada	1:57.84	Arsenio Bustos; United States	1:59.89	Leonardo Coelho; Brazil	2:00.58
400 m individual medley	Jay Litherland; United States	4:15.44	Collyn Gagne; Canada	4:17.05	Brandonn Almeida; Brazil	4:18.74
4 × 100 m freestyle relay	Brazil; Guilherme Caribé (48.41); Marcelo Chierighini (48.00); Victor Alcará (48.34); Felipe Ribeiro de Souza (48.76); Breno Correia^{[a]}	3:13.51	United States; Jonny Kulow (48.45); Adam Chaney (48.17); Jack Aikins (48.45); Brooks Curry (49.00); Coby Carrozza^{[a]} Lukas Miller^{[a]}	3:14.22	Canada; Javier Acevedo (48.75); Édouard Fullum-Huot (49.31); Stephen Calkins (49.29); Finlay Knox (48.48); Jeremy Bagshaw^{[a]} Blake Tierney^{[a]}	3:15.83
4 × 200 m freestyle relay	Brazil; Murilo Sartori (1:47.52); Breno Correia (1:47.60); Fernando Scheffer (1:45.90); Guilherme Costa (1:46.51); Luiz Altamir Melo^{[a]} Leonardo Coelho^{[a]} Felipe Ribeiro de Souza^{[a]}	7:07.53 GR	United States; Zane Grothe (1:47.98); Coby Carrozza (1:47.63); Brooks Curry (1:46.78); Jack Dahlgren (1:45.67); James Plage^{[a]} Mason Laur^{[a]} Lukas Miller^{[a]} Christopher O'Connor^{[a]}	7:08.06	Canada; Jeremy Bagshaw (1:49.89); Finlay Knox (1:47.72); Alex Axon (1:48.90); Javier Acevedo (1:48.25); Yu Tong Wu^{[a]} Blake Tierney^{[a]} Raben Dommann^{[a]}	7:14.76
4 × 100 m medley relay	United States; Jack Aikins (54.00); Jacob Foster (1:00.61); Lukas Miller (51.36); Jonny Kulow (47.32); Christopher O'Connor^{[a]} Noah Nichols^{[a]} Jack Dahlgren^{[a]} Coby Carrozza^{[a]}	3:33.29	Brazil; Guilherme Basseto (54.70); João Gomes Júnior (1:00.45); Vinicius Lanza (53.03); Guilherme Caribé (46.94); Gabriel Fantoni^{[a]} Raphael Windmuller^{[a]} Victor Baganha^{[a]} Victor Alcará^{[a]}	3:35.12	Canada; Blake Tierney (54.57); Gabe Mastromatteo (1:00.20); Finlay Knox (52.96); Javier Acevedo (47.99); Raben Dommann^{[a]} Brayden Taivassalo^{[a]} Keir Ogilvie^{[b]} Édouard Fullum-Huot^{[b]}	3:35.72
10 km open water	Brennan Gravley; United States	1:50:23.4	Franco Cassini; Argentina	1:50:23.6	Paulo Strehlke; Mexico	1:50:23.8
AM Americas record | WJR World Junior record | WR World record NR National record (Any world record is necessarily also an Americas and national record. Area records (for continental regions) are also national records.)

^{a} Swimmers who participated in the heats only and received medals.

==== Women's events ====
Event	Gold		Silver		Bronze	
50 m freestyle	Maggie Mac Neil; Canada	24.84	Not awarded		Catie DeLoof; United States	24.88
50 m freestyle	Gabriela Albiero; United States	24.84	Not awarded		Catie DeLoof; United States	24.88
100 m freestyle	Maggie Mac Neil; Canada	53.64 GR	Stephanie Balduccini; Brazil	54.13	Catie DeLoof; United States	54.50
200 m freestyle	Mary-Sophie Harvey; Canada	1:58.08	Maria Fernanda Costa; Brazil	1:58.12	Camille Spink; United States	1:58.61
400 m freestyle	Paige Madden; United States	4:06.45 GR	Maria Fernanda Costa; Brazil	4:06.68	Gabrielle Roncatto; Brazil	4:06.88
800 m freestyle	Paige Madden; United States	8:27.99	Rachel Stege; United States	8:28.50	Viviane Jungblut; Brazil	8:33.55
1500 m freestyle	Rachel Stege; United States	16:13.59 GR	Kristel Köbrich; Chile	16:14.59	Viviane Jungblut; Brazil	16:19.89
100 m backstroke	Josephine Fuller; United States	59.67	Kennedy Noble; United States	59.84	Danielle Hanus; Canada	1:01.49
200 m backstroke	Kennedy Noble; United States	2:08.03 GR	Reilly Tiltmann; United States	2:12.79	Alexia Assunção; Brazil	2:13.31
100 m breaststroke	Rachel Nicol; Canada	1:07.28	Sophie Angus; Canada	1:07.55	Macarena Ceballos; Argentina	1:07.68
200 m breaststroke	Sydney Pickrem; Canada	2:23.39	Kelsey Wog; Canada	2:23.49	Gabrielle Assis; Brazil	2:25.52
100 m butterfly	Maggie Mac Neil; Canada	56.94 GR	Kelly Pash; United States	57.85	Olivia Bray; United States	58.36
200 m butterfly	Dakota Luther; United States	2:09.97	María José Mata; Mexico	2:10.25	Kelly Pash; United States	2:10.30
200 m individual medley	Sydney Pickrem; Canada	2:09.04 GR	Mary-Sophie Harvey; Canada	2:11.92	Kennedy Noble; United States	2:14.19
400 m individual medley	Julie Brousseau; Canada	4:43.76	Lucerne Bell; United States	4:44.27	Gabrielle Roncatto; Brazil	4:44.92
4 × 100 m freestyle relay	Canada; Mary-Sophie Harvey (54.69); Brooklyn Douthwright (54.99); Maggie Mac Neil (53.14); Katerine Savard (54.93); Julie Brousseau^{[b]} Emma O'Croinin^{[b]}	3:37.75	United States; Gabriela Albiero (55.02); Catie DeLoof (54.19); Kayla Wilson (54.85); Amy Fulmer (54.36); Camille Spink^{[b]} Olivia Bray^{[b]} Reilly Tiltmann^{[b]}	3:38.42	Brazil; Ana Carolina Vieira (54.67); Stephanie Balduccini (54.08); Giovanna Diamante (55.39); Celine Bispo (55.80); Cristina Versiani^{[b]}	3:39.94
4 × 200 m freestyle relay	United States; Camille Spink (1:59.38); Kayla Wilson (1:58.76); Kelly Pash (1:58.62); Paige Madden (1:58.50); Amy Fulmer^{[b]} Rachel Stege^{[b]} Olivia Bray^{[b]}	7:55.26	Brazil; Maria Fernanda Costa (1:58.39); Nathalia Almeida (1:59.65); Stephanie Balduccini (1:58.40); Gabrielle Roncatto (1:59.41); Maria Paula Heitmann^{[b]} Giovanna Diamante^{[b]} Celine Bispo^{[b]} Maria Luíza Pessanha^{[b]}	7:55.85	Canada; Mary-Sophie Harvey (1:59.40); Julie Brousseau (1:58.54); Brooklyn Doutwright (1:59.16); Katerine Savard (1:59.88); Emma O'Croinin^{[b]} Sydney Pickrem^{[b]}	7:56.98
4 × 100 m medley relay	Canada; Danielle Hanus (1:00.97); Rachel Nicol (1:07.14); Maggie Mac Neil (56.83); Mary-Sophie Harvey (53.82); Madelyn Gatrall^{[b]} Sophie Angus^{[b]} Katerine Savard^{[b]} Brooklyn Doutwright^{[b]}	3:58.76	United States; Josephine Fuller (1:00.47); Emma Weber (1:07.39); Kelly Pash (57.62); Catie DeLoof (53.91); Reilly Tiltmann^{[b]} Anna Keating^{[b]} Olivia Bray^{[b]} Gabriela Albiero^{[b]}	3:59.39	Mexico; Miranda Grana (1:01.86); Melissa Rodríguez (67.44); María José Mata (59.40); Sofia Revilak (56.03); Andrea Sansores^{[b]} María Fernanda Jiménez^{[b]} Miriam Guevara^{[b]} Athena Meneses^{[b]}	4:04.73
10 km open water	Ashley Twichell; United States	1:56:16.4	Ana Marcela Cunha; Brazil	1:57:29.4	Viviane Jungblut; Brazil	1:57:51.1
AM Americas record | WJR World Junior record | WR World record NR National record (Any world record is necessarily also an Americas and national record. Area records (for continental regions) are also national records.)

^{b} Swimmers who participated in the heats only and received medals.

==== Mixed events ====
Event	Gold		Silver		Bronze	
4 × 100 m freestyle relay	Brazil; Guilherme Caribé (48.26); Marcelo Chierighini (47.59); Ana Carolina Vieira (54.50); Stephanie Balduccini (53.43); Felipe Ribeiro de Souza^{[c]} Victor Alcará^{[c]} Lorrane Ferreira^{[c]} Nathalia Almeida^{[c]}	3:23.78 GR	United States; Brooks Curry (48.43); Jonny Kulow (47.44); Catie DeLoof (54.01); Amy Fulmer (54.33); Jack Dahlgren^{[c]} Gabi Albiero^{[c]} Paige Madden^{[c]}	3:24.21	Canada; Finlay Knox (49.80); Javier Acevedo (48.02); Maggie Mac Neil (53.47); Mary-Sophie Harvey (53.94); Stephen Calkins^{[c]} Édouard Fullum-Huot^{[c]} Brooklyn Doutwright^{[c]} Katerine Savard^{[c]}	3:25.23
4 × 100 m medley relay	United States; Kennedy Noble (59.72); Jacob Foster (60.09); Kelly Pash (57.51); Jonny Kulow (47.39); Jack Aikins^{[c]} Arsenio Bustos^{[c]} Olivia Bray^{[c]} Kayla Wilson^{[c]}	3:44.71 GR	Canada; Javier Acevedo (54.45); Gabe Mastromatteo (60.78); Maggie Mac Neil (56.67); Mary-Sophie Harvey (54.30); Blake Tierney^{[c]} James Dergousoff^{[c]} Katerine Savard^{[c]} Brooklyn Doutwright^{[c]}	3:46.20	Brazil; Guilherme Basseto (55.67); João Gomes Júnior (60.47); Clarissa Rodrigues; Stephanie Balduccini; Gabriel Fantoni^{[c]} Jhennifer Conceição^{[c]} Victor Baganha^{[c]} Giovanna Diamante^{[c]}	3:49.24
AM Americas record | WJR World Junior record | WR World record NR National record (Any world record is necessarily also an Americas and national record. Area records (for continental regions) are also national records.)

^{c} Swimmers who participated in the heats only and received medals.

== See also ==
- Swimming at the 2023 Parapan American Games
- Swimming at the 2024 Summer Olympics
