= Swimming at the 2023 Pan American Games – Women's 400 metre freestyle =

Women's 400 metre freestyle at the 2023 Pan American Games
- Venue: Aquatic Center
- Date: October 21, 2023
- Competitors: 17 from 11 nations

Medalists
Gold medal	Paige Madden	United States
Silver medal	Maria Fernanda Costa	Brazil
Bronze medal	Gabrielle Roncatto	Brazil

The women's 400 metre freestyle competition of the swimming events at the 2023 Pan American Games was held on October 21, 2023, at the Aquatic Center in Santiago, Chile.

== Records ==
Prior to this competition, the existing world and Pan American Games records were as follows:

World record	Ariarne Titmus (AUS)	3:55.38	Fukuoka, Japan	July 23, 2023
Pan American Games record	Emily Overholt (CAN)	4:08.42	Toronto, Canada	July 17, 2015

The following record was established during the competition:

Date	Event	Swimmer	Nation	Time	Record
October 21	Final	Paige Madden	United States	4:06.45	GR

== Results ==
KEY:	QA	Qualified for A final	QB	Qualified for B final	GR	Games record	NR	National record	PB	Personal best	SB	Seasonal best	WD	Withdrew

=== Heats ===
The first round was held on October 21.

Rank	Heat	Lane	Name	Nationality	Time	Notes
1	3	5	Maria Fernanda Costa	Brazil	4:13.85	QA
2	2	4	Gabrielle Roncatto	Brazil	4:14.37	QA
3	3	4	Paige Madden	United States	4:14.42	QA
4	3	3	Rachel Stege	United States	4:14.60	QA
5	2	5	Agostina Hein	Argentina	4:15.39	QA
6	2	3	Julie Brosseau	Canada	4:15.54	QA
7	2	2	Delfina Dini	Argentina	4:16.26	QA
8	3	6	Maria Paula Heitmann	Brazil	4:16.61	QA
9	3	2	Maria Yegres	Venezuela	4:23.47	QB
10	2	6	Emma O'Croinin	Canada	4:23.88	WD
11	2	1	Lucero Mejia	Independent Athletes Team	4:30.63	QB
12	3	7	Kyra Rabess	Cayman Islands	4:32.60	QB
13	1	3	Harper Barrowman	Cayman Islands	4:32.65	QB
14	3	1	Karen Rodriguez	Mexico	4:32.89	QB
15	2	7	Michell Ramirez	Honduras	4:33.45	QB
16	1	4	Natalia Kuipers	Virgin Islands	4:35.84	QB
17	1	5	Ariana Valle	El Salvador	4:37.36	QB

=== Final B ===
The B final was also held on October 21.

Rank	Lane	Name	Nationality	Time	Notes
9	4	Maria Paula Heitmann	Brazil	4:16.81	
10	6	Harper Barrowman	Cayman Islands	4:28.38	
11	3	Kyra Rabess	Cayman Islands	4:28.49	
12	5	Lucero Mejia	Independent Athletes Team	4:28.67	
13	2	Karen Rodriguez	Mexico	4:31.00	
14	8	Ariana Valle	El Salvador	4:31.69	
15	7	Michell Ramirez	Honduras	4:32.70	
16	1	Natalia Kuipers	Virgin Islands	4:37.29	

=== Final A ===
The A final was also held on October 21.

Rank	Lane	Name	Nationality	Time	Notes
1st place, gold medalist(s)	3	Paige Madden	United States	4:06.45	GR
2nd place, silver medalist(s)	4	Maria Fernanda Costa	Brazil	4:06.68	
3rd place, bronze medalist(s)	5	Gabrielle Roncatto	Brazil	4:06.88	
4	6	Rachel Stege	United States	4:06.94	
5	7	Julie Brosseau	Canada	4:11.32	
6	2	Agostina Hein	Argentina	4:15.26	
7	1	Delfina Dini	Argentina	4:17.55	
8	8	Maria Yegres	Venezuela	4:22.47	
