= Swimming at the 2023 Pan American Games – Women's 400 metre individual medley =

Women's 400 metre individual medley at the 2023 Pan American Games
- Venue: Aquatic Centre
- Date: October 24
- Competitors: 19 from 14 nations

Medalists
Gold medal	Julie Brousseau	Canada
Silver medal	Lucerne Bell	United States
Bronze medal	Gabrielle Roncatto	Brazil

The women's 400 metre individual medley competition of the swimming events at the 2023 Pan American Games were held on October 24, 2023, at the Aquatic Center in Santiago, Chile.

== Records ==
Prior to this competition, the existing world and Pan American Games records were as follows:

World record	Summer McIntosh (CAN)	4:25.87	Toronto, Canada	January 4, 2023
Pan American Games record	Caitlin Leverenz (USA)	4:35.46	Toronto, Canada	July 16, 2015

== Results ==
KEY:	QA	Qualified for A final	QB	Qualified for B final	GR	Games record	NR	National record	PB	Personal best	SB	Seasonal best

=== Heats ===
The highest eight scores advance to the final.

Rank	Heat	Lane	Name	Nationality	Time	Notes
1	2	4	Lucerne Bell	United States	4:49.68	QA
2	3	4	Julie Brousseau	Canada	4:49.78	QA
3	2	5	Nathalia Almeida	Brazil	4:51.33	QA
4	2	3	Gabrielle Roncatto	Brazil	4:51.43	QA
5	3	5	Kristen Romano	Puerto Rico	4:52.48	QA
6	3	6	María Alborzén	Argentina	4:56.18	QA
7	3	3	Florencia Perotti	Argentina	4:58.83	QA
8	3	1	Alondra Ortiz	Costa Rica	4:59.46	QA
9	3	7	Samantha Baños	Colombia	5:01.27	QB
10	2	6	Magdalena Portela	Argentina	5:02.32	QB
11	3	8	Mariana Cote	Venezuela	5:06.11	QB
12	3	7	Karen Rodríguez	Mexico	5:06.49	QB
13	2	1	Lucero Mejia	Independent Athletes Team	5:08.30	QB
14	2	2	María Fé Muñoz	Peru	5:09.37	QB
15	3	2	Isabella Chavez	Mexico	5:09.84	QB
16	2	8	Daine Pedré	Cuba	5:11.96	QB
17	1	3	Sierrah Broadbelt	Cayman Islands	5:15.81	
18	1	5	Giuliana Alberti	Chile	5:20.29	
19	1	4	Florencia Orpis	Chile	5:23.02	

=== Final B ===
The B final was held on October 24.

Rank	Lane	Name	Nationality	Time	Notes
9	5	Magdalena Portela	Argentina	4:55.61	
10	4	Samantha Baños	Colombia	4:59.60	
11	3	Mariana Cote	Venezuela	5:04.65	
12	6	Karen Rodríguez	Mexico	5:04.75	
13	7	Isabella Chavez	Mexico	5:08.72	
14	2	Lucero Mejia	Independent Athletes Team	5:10.94	
15	1	Sierrah Broadbelt	Cayman Islands	5:17.56	
16	8	Giuliana Alberti	Chile	5:25.16	

=== Final A ===
The A final was held on October 24.

Rank	Lane	Name	Nationality	Time	Notes
1st place, gold medalist(s)	5	Julie Brousseau	Canada	4:43.76	
2nd place, silver medalist(s)	4	Lucerne Bell	United States	4:44.27	
3rd place, bronze medalist(s)	6	Gabrielle Roncatto	Brazil	4:47.92	
4	2	Kristen Romano	Puerto Rico	4:48.73	
5	3	Nathalia Almeida	Brazil	4:52.15	
6	7	María Alborzén	Argentina	4:54.67	
7	8	Alondra Ortiz	Costa Rica	4:59.34	
8	1	Florencia Perotti	Argentina	5:01.01	
