= Swimming at the 2023 Pan American Games – Mixed 4 × 100 metre freestyle relay =

Mixed 4 × 100 metre freestyle relay at the 2023 Pan American Games
- Venue: Aquatic Center
- Date: October 22, 2023
- Competitors: TBD from 14 nations
- Winning time: 3:23.78

Medalists
Gold medal	Guilherme Caribé; Marcelo Chierighini; Ana Carolina Vieira; Stephanie Balduccini; Felipe Ribeiro de Souza; Victor Alcará; Lorrane Ferreira; Nathalia Almeida	Brazil
Silver medal	Brooks Curry; Jonny Kulow; Catie DeLoof; Amy Fulmer; Jack Dahlgren; Gabi Albiero; Paige Madden	United States
Bronze medal	Finlay Knox; Javier Acevedo; Maggie Mac Neil; Mary-Sophie Harvey; Stephen Calkins; Édouard Fullum-Huot; Brooklyn Doutwright; Katerine Savard	Canada

The mixed 4 × 100 metre freestyle relay competition of the swimming events at the 2023 Pan American Games was held on October 22, 2023, at

the Aquatic Center in Santiago, Chile.

== Records ==
Prior to this competition, the existing world and Pan American Games records were as follows:

World record	Australia (AUS); Jack Cartwright (48.14); Kyle Chalmers (47.25); Shayna Jack (51.73); Mollie O'Callaghan (51.71)	3:18.83	Fukuoka, Japan	July 29, 2023
Pan American Games record	United States (USA); Michael Chadwick (49.09); Nathan Adrian (47.56); Claire Rasmus (55.10); Margo Geer (53.09)	3:24.84	Lima, Peru	August 7, 2023

The following games record was established during the competition:

Date	Event	Swimmer	Time	Record
October 22	Final	Brazil (BRA); Guilherme Caribé (48.26); Marcelo Chierighini (47.59); Ana Carolina Vieira (54.50); Stephanie Balduccini (53.43)	3:23.78	GR

== Results ==
KEY:	Q	Qualified for final	GR	Games record	NR	National record	PB	Personal best	SB	Seasonal best

=== Heats ===
The first round was held on October 22.

Rank	Heat	Lane	Nation	Swimmers	Time	Notes
1	1	4	United States	Jack Dahlgren (49.00); Brooks Curry (48.30); Gabi Albiero (54.88); Paige Madden (56.78)	3:28.96	Q
2	2	4	Canada	Stephens Calkins (49.68); Edouard Fullum-Huot (49.24); Brooklyn Douthwright (55.49); Katerine Savard (55.64)	3:30.05	Q
3	2	5	Brazil	Felipe Ribeiro de Souza (50.88); Victor Alcará (48.59); Lorrane Ferreira (56.40); Nathalia Almeida (56.15)	3:32.02	Q
4	2	6	Colombia	Sebastián Camacho (51.36); Juan García (51.24); Isabella Bedoya (57.77); Sirena Rowe (55.91)	3:36.28	Q
5	2	3	Venezuela	Jesus Lopez (51.16); Diego Mas Fraiz (50.96); Mercedes Toledo (57.50); Fabiana Pesce (58.86)	3:38.48	Q
6	1	3	Argentina	Florencia Perotti (58.22); Magdalena Portela (58.48); Joaquin Piñero (52.12); Matias Santiso (49.78)	3:38.60	Q
7	1	5	Mexico	Gabriel Castaño (50.50); Maximiliano Vega Cuevas (52.16); Susana Hernandez Barradas (58.84); Maria Mata Cocco (57.50)	3:39.00	Q
8	1	6	Uruguay	Leo Nolles (51.49); Diego Aranda (51.38); Maria Solari (59.42); Luna Chabat (58.04)	3:40.33	Q
9	2	1	Peru	Rafael Ponce (51.56); Ricardo Espinosa (52.59); Rafaela Fernandini (58.31); Sophia Ribeiro (59.44)	3:41.90	
10	2	2	Independent Athletes Team	Maria Morales (59.74); Christopher Grossmann (53.02); Maria Santis Mejia (59.69); Miguel Vásquez (51.36)	3:43.81	
11	1	7	Bahamas	Lamar Taylor (50.28); Zaylie Thompson (59.31); Katelyn Cabral (1:01.48); Luke Thompson (53.87)	3:44.94	
12	1	1	Panama	Isaac Beitia (51.75); Jeancarlo Calderón (52.30); Maria Castillo Cedeño (59.17); Emily Santos (1:01.88)	3:45.10	
13	1	2	Jamaica	Sidrell Williams (53.62); Kito Campbell (55.68); Sabrina Lyn (59.71); Emily Macdonald (58.46)	3:47.47	
14	2	7	Chile	Manuel Osorio (52.63); Vicente Villanueva (54.90); Florencia Orpis (1:03.03); Arantza Salazar (1:02.76)	3:53.32	

=== Final ===
The final round was also held on October 22.

Rank	Lane	Nation	Swimmers	Time	Notes
1st place, gold medalist(s)	3	Brazil	Guilherme Caribé (48.26); Marcelo Chierighini (47.59); Ana Carolina Vieira (54.50); Stephanie Balduccini (53.43)	3:23.78	GR
2nd place, silver medalist(s)	4	United States	Brooks Curry (48.43); Jonny Kulow (47.44); Catie DeLoof (54.01); Amy Fulmer (54.33)	3:24.21	
3rd place, bronze medalist(s)	5	Canada	Finlay Knox (49.80); Javier Acevedo (48.02); Maggie Mac Neil (53.47); Mary-Sophie Harvey (53.94)	3:25.23	
4	1	Mexico	Andres Dupont (48.86); Jorge Iga (48.61); Sofia Revilak (55.72); Athena Meneses (55.68)	3:28.87	
5	7	Argentina	Guido Buscaglia (49.81); Matias Santiso (49.08); Guillermina Ruggiero (56.12); Lucia Gauna (56.23)	3:31.24	
6	6	Colombia	Santiago Corredor (50.87); Sebastián Camacho (51.27); Sirena Rowe (56.00); Isabella Arcila (56.04)	3:34.18	
7	2	Venezuela	Emil Perez (51.28); Diego Mas Fraiz (50.84); Maria Yegres (57.65); Carla Gonzalez (56.11)	3:35.88	
8	8	Uruguay	Leo Nolles (51.14); Diego Aranda (51.87); Maria Solari (59.76); Luna Chabat (58.21)	3:40.98	
