= Swimming at the 2018 South American Games =

- Venue: G.A.M.C. Aquatics Center
- Dates: 27 May – 1 June
- Nations: 12

The swimming competitions at the 2018 South American Games in Cochabamba took place from 27 to 30 May at the G.A.M.C. Aquatics Center at Mariscal Santa Cruz Park. Open water swimming events were held on 1 June at La Angostura Lake.

== Medal summary ==
=== Men ===
Event	Gold		Silver		Bronze	
50m freestyle	Renzo Tjon-A-Joe; Suriname	22.65	Cristian Quintero; Venezuela	22.71	André Calvelo; Brazil	22.80
100m freestyle	Breno Correia; Brazil	49.40	Cristian Quintero; Venezuela	49.86	Renzo Tjon-A-Joe; Suriname	50.12
200m freestyle	Fernando Scheffer; Brazil	1:50.75	Cristian Quintero; Venezuela	1:50.89	Benjamin Hockin; Paraguay	1:52.03
400m freestyle	Guilherme Costa; Brazil	3:57.31	Rafael Davila; Venezuela	3:58.92	Esteban Enderica; Ecuador	4:01.62
1500m freestyle	Esteban Enderica; Ecuador	15:38.16	Guilherme Costa; Brazil	15:46.60	Rafael Davila; Venezuela	16:08.12
100m backstroke	Gabriel Fantoni; Brazil	55.89	Omar Pinzón; Colombia	56.31	Charles Hockin; Paraguay	56.65
200m backstroke	Gabriel Fantoni; Brazil	2:04.41	Matías López; Paraguay	2:04.62	Omar Pinzón; Colombia	2:05.37
100m breaststroke	Jorge Murillo; Colombia	1:01.14; GR	Renato Prono; Paraguay	1:02.10	Carlos Mahecha; Colombia	1:03.13
200m breaststroke	Jorge Murillo; Colombia	2:14.43; GR	Carlos Mahecha; Colombia	2:18.49	Juan Sequera; Venezuela	2:20.95
100m butterfly	Kaue Carvalho; Brazil	53.90	Esnaider Reales; Colombia	53.92	Matheus Gonche; Brazil	54.41
200m butterfly	Kaue Carvalho; Brazil	2:02.37	David Arias; Colombia	2:03.37	Miguel Armijos; Ecuador	2:05.17
200m individual medley	Omar Pinzón; Colombia	2:06.37	Juan Sequera; Venezuela	2:06.58	Matías López; Paraguay	2:06.96
400m individual medley	Matías López; Paraguay	4:38.76	Andy Arteta; Venezuela	4:46.15	Gustavo Gutiérrez; Peru	4:49.26
4×100m freestyle relay	Venezuela; Jesus López (50.96); Bryan Chavez (49.70); Alberto Mestre Jr. (49.73); Cristian Quintero (49.13)	3:19.52	Brazil; Marco Ferreira Júnior (50.90); Breno Correia (48.99); André Luiz de Souza (50.20); Fernando Scheffer (50.04)	3:20.13	Colombia; Cardenio Fernández (52.25); Esnaider Reales (51.82); Carlos Mahecha (51.78); David Arias (51.67)	3:27.52
4×200m freestyle relay	Brazil; Breno Correia (1:48.30) GR; André Luiz de Souza (1:53.92); Kaue Carvalho (1:53.67); Fernando Scheffer (1:55.80)	7:31.69	Venezuela; Bryan Chavez (1:54.00); Andy Arteta (1:56.37); Rafael Davila (1:56.53); Cristian Quintero (1:52.89)	7:39.79	Colombia; Juan Morales (1:55.01); Omar Pinzón (2:03.30); David Arias (1:57.16); Esnaider Reales (1:54,64)	7:50.11
4×100m medley relay	Colombia; Omar Pinzón (56.24); Jorge Murillo (1:00.78); Esnaider Reales (54.12); Cardenio Fernández (51.69)	3:42.83	Brazil; Gabriel Fanton (55.54); Yuri Vieira (1:04.34); Kaue Carvalho (53.93); Marco Ferreira Júnior (49.34)	3:43.15	Venezuela; Robinson Molina (57.81); Juan Sequera (1:03.08); Bryan Chavez (54.92); Cristian Quintero (49.18)	3:44.99
10 km open water	Esteban Enderica; Ecuador	1:52:01.52	Diego Vera; Venezuela	1:52:19.89	Wilder Carreño; Venezuela	1:54:50.94

=== Women ===
Event	Gold		Silver		Bronze	
50m freestyle	Isabella Arcila; Colombia	25.25; GR	Karen Torrez; Bolivia	25.60	Jeserik Pinto; Venezuela	25.96
100m freestyle	Isabella Arcila; Colombia	55.81	Karen Torrez; Bolivia	56.41	Jeserik Pinto; Venezuela	56.66
200m freestyle	Gabrielle Roncatto; Brazil	2:04.61	Rafaela Raurich; Brazil	2:04.80	María Álvarez; Colombia	2:04.90
400m freestyle	Kristel Köbrich; Chile	4:19.58	Gabrielle Roncatto; Brazil	4:25.70	María Álvarez; Colombia	4:25.88
800m freestyle	Kristel Köbrich; Chile	8:47.82	Samantha Arévalo; Ecuador	9:00.95	Beatriz Dizotti; Brazil	9:02.76
100m backstroke	Isabella Arcila; Colombia	1:01.82	Fernanda de Goeij; Brazil	1:02.94	McKenna DeBever; Peru	1:04.88
200m backstroke	Andrea Hurtado; Peru	2:19.13	Fernanda de Goeij; Brazil	2:19.55	Laura Melo; Colombia	2:22.94
100m breaststroke	Ana Carolina Vieira; Brazil	1:11.59	Mercedes Toledo; Venezuela	1:11.83	Bruna Monteiro Leme; Brazil	1:11.84
200m breaststroke	Bruna Monteiro Leme; Brazil	2:35.67	Beatriz Brandão Lysy; Brazil	2:35.79	Mercedes Toledo; Venezuela	2:37.16
100m butterfly	Jeserik Pinto; Venezuela	1:00.70	Karen Torrez; Bolivia	1:00.96	Clarissa Rodrigues; Brazil	1:02.40
200m butterfly	Beatriz Dizotti; Brazil	2:18.59	Azra Avdic; Peru	2:20.37	María Román; Colombia	2:21.98
200m individual medley	Gabrielle Roncatto; Brazil	2:20.11	Bruna Monteiro Leme; Brazil	2:20.88	McKenna DeBever; Peru	2:21.25
400m individual medley	Gabrielle Roncatto; Brazil	5:04.91	Azra Avdic; Peru	5:05.02	María Román; Colombia	5:12.72
4×100m freestyle relay	Brazil; Ana Carolina Vieira (57.63); Camila Mello (56.70); Clarissa Rodrigues (58.00); Rafaela Raurich (57.88)	3:50.21	Colombia; Valentina Becerra (59.94); Karen Durango (1:00.14); María Álvarez (58.24); Isabella Arcila (56.19)	3:54.21	Venezuela; Fabiana Pesce (1:00.35); Andrea Garrido (59.60); Mariangela Cincotti (1:00.35); Jeserik Pinto (56.11)	3:56.41
4×200m freestyle relay	Brazil; Ana Carolina Vieira (2:05.86); Camila Mello (2:04.54); Rafaela Raurich; Gabrielle Roncatto	8:31.93	Colombia; Karen Durango (2:09.89); María Román (2:09.68); Isabella Arcila (2:07.67); María Álvarez (2:05.60)	8:32.84	Peru; Jessica Cattaneo (2:08.05); Azra Avdic (2:06.93); Andrea Hurtado (2:10.32); María Bramont-Arias (2:10.99)	8:36.29
4×100m medley relay	Brazil; Fernanda de Goeij (1:03.61); Ana Carolina Vieira (1:11.40); Clarissa Rodrigues (1:02.06); Rafaela Raurich (56.61)	4:13.68	Colombia; Isabella Arcila (1:02.57); Karina Vivas (1:11.53); Valentina Becerra (1:02.55); María Álvarez (57.68)	4:14.33	Peru; Andrea Hurtado (1:06.76); McKenna DeBever (1:16.30); Azra Avdic (1:04.81); Jessica Cattaneo (58.63)	4:26.50
10 km open water	Samantha Arévalo; Ecuador	2:05:49	Romina Imwinkelried; Argentina	2:06:47	Nataly Caldas; Ecuador	2:10:25
