= Swimming at the 2022 South American Games =

Swimming competitions at the 2022 South American Games

- Venue: Centro Acuático Nacional
- Dates: October 2−5
- Nations: 14

Swimming competitions at the 2022 South American Games in Asunción, Paraguay were held between October 2 and 5, 2022 at the Centro Acuático Nacional

== Schedule ==
The competition schedule is as follows:

H	Heats	½	Semi-finals	F	Final

Men
Date Event	Sun 2		Mon 3		Tue 4		Wed 5	
Session →	M	E	M	E	M	E	M	E
50 m freestyle							H	F
100 m freestyle	H	F						
200 m freestyle			H	F				
400 m freestyle							H	F
800 m freestyle	H	F						
1500 m freestyle					H	F		
50 m backstroke	H	F						
100 m backstroke			H	F				
200 m backstroke					H	F		
50 m breaststroke					H	F		
100 m breaststroke	H	F						
200 m breaststroke			H	F				
50 m butterfly			H	F				
100 m butterfly					H	F		
200 m butterfly							H	F
200 m individual medley	H	F						
400 m individual medley			H	F				
4×100 m freestyle relay						F		
4×200 m freestyle relay		F						
4×100 m medley relay				F				

Mixed
Date Event	Sun 2		Mon 3		Tue 4		Wed 5	
Session →	M	E	M	E	M	E	M	E
4×100 m freestyle relay								F
4×100 m medley relay							H	F

Women
Date Event	Sun 2		Mon 3		Tue 4		Wed 5	
Session →	M	E	M	E	M	E	M	E
50 m freestyle							H	F
100 m freestyle	H	F						
200 m freestyle			H	F				
400 m freestyle							H	F
800 m freestyle		F						
1500 m freestyle					H	F		
50 m backstroke	H	F						
100 m backstroke			H	F				
200 m backstroke					H	F		
50 m breaststroke					H	F		
100 m breaststroke	H	F						
200 m breaststroke			H	F				
50 m butterfly			H	F				
100 m butterfly					H	F		
200 m butterfly							H	F
200 m individual medley	H	F						
400 m individual medley			H	F				
4×100 m freestyle relay						F		
4×200 m freestyle relay		F						
4×100 m medley relay				F				

== Medal summary ==
=== Medal table ===
* Host nation (Paraguay)

Rank	Nation	Gold	Silver	Bronze	Total
1	Brazil	34	16	8	58
2	Argentina	5	7	9	21
3	Venezuela	1	3	7	11
4	Aruba	1	2	0	3
4	Chile	1	2	0	3
6	Colombia	0	11	13	24
7	Paraguay*	0	1	2	3
8	Peru	0	0	4	4
Totals (8 entries)		42	42	43	127

=== Medalists ===
==== Men ====
Event	Gold		Silver		Bronze	
50 metre freestyle	Luiz Borges; Brazil	22.06 GR	Mikel Schreuders; Aruba	22.37 NR	Alberto Mestre; Venezuela	22.56
100 metre freestyle	Mikel Schreuders; Aruba	49.28	Felipe Ribeiro; Brazil	49.51	Gabriel Santos; Brazil	49.78
200 metre freestyle	Alfonso Mestre; Venezuela	1:48.61	Vinicius Assunção; Brazil	1:48.68	Breno Correia; Brazil	1:48.77
400 metre freestyle	Guilherme Costa; Brazil	3:47.56 GR	Alfonso Mestre; Venezuela	3:47.71	Juan Morales; Colombia	3:51.51
800 metre freestyle	Guilherme Costa; Brazil	7:51.56 GR	Alfonso Mestre; Venezuela	7:54.30	Juan Morales; Colombia	7:54.44 NR
1500 metre freestyle	Guilherme Costa; Brazil	15:13.51 GR	Juan Morales; Colombia	15:15.59 NR	Alfonso Mestre; Venezuela	15:22.52
50 metre backstroke	Guilherme Basseto; Brazil	25.06 GR	Charles Hockin; Paraguay	25.60	Omar Pinzón; Colombia	26.02
100 metre backstroke	Leonardo de Deus; Brazil	55.05	Guilherme Basseto; Brazil	55.08	Omar Pinzón; Colombia	55.31
200 metre backstroke	Leonardo de Deus; Brazil	1:59.02 GR	Omar Pinzón; Colombia	2:01.43	Matías López; Paraguay	2:02.54
50 metre breaststroke	Felipe França Silva; Brazil	27.74 GR	Mikel Schreuders; Aruba	27.80	Jorge Murillo; Colombia	27.81
100 metre breaststroke	Evandro Vinicius Silva; Brazil	1:01.02 GR	Jorge Murillo; Colombia	1:01.19	Felipe França; Brazil	1:01.50
200 metre breaststroke	Evandro Vinicius Silva; Brazil	2:13.22 GR	Caio Pumputis; Brazil	2:13.96	Gabriel Morelli; Argentina	2:14.71
50 metre butterfly	Gabriel Santos; Brazil	24.00 GR	Roberto Strelkov; Argentina	24.19	Camilo Marrugo; Colombia Emil Pérez; Venezuela	24.29
100 metre butterfly	Matheus Gonche; Brazil	52.37	David Arias; Colombia	53.39	Emil Pérez; Venezuela	53.42
200 metre butterfly	Leonardo de Deus; Brazil	1:57.17 GR	Matheus Gonche; Brazil	1:57.28	David Arias; Colombia	2:01.23
200 metre individual medley	Caio Pumputis; Brazil	2:01.08	Leonardo Coelho Santos; Brazil	2:01.83	Omar Pinzón; Colombia	2:02.21
400 metre individual medley	Brandonn Almeida; Brazil	4:19.25 GR	Santiago Corredor; Colombia	4:24.30	Matheo Mateos; Paraguay	4:24.64 NR
4 × 100 metre freestyle relay	Luiz Borges; Gabriel Santos; Felipe Ribeiro; Vinicius Assunção; Brazil	3:16.34 GR	Alberto Mestre; Alfonso Mestre; Emil Pérez; Jesús López; Venezuela	3:21.43	Camilo Marrugo; Cardenio Fernández; Juan Morales; Santiago Corredor; Colombia	3:22.21 NR
4 × 200 metre freestyle relay	Breno Correia; Guilherme Costa; Leonardo Coelho Santos; Vinicius Assunção; Brazil	7:20.18 GR	Cardenio Fernández; Juan Morales; Omar Pinzón; Santiago Corredor; Colombia	7:27.60 NR	Alberto Mestre; Alfonso Mestre; Emil Pérez; Jorge Otaiza; Venezuela	7:29.20
4 × 100 metre medley relay	Guilherme Basseto; Evandro Vinicius Silva; Matheus Gonche; Felipe Ribeiro; Brazil	3:39.50	Omar Pinzón; Jorge Murillo; Esnaider Reales; Camilo Marrugo; Colombia	3:41.05	Gastón Hernández; Gabriel Morelli; Roberto Strelkov; Guido Buscaglia; Argentina	3:42.75

==== Women ====
Event	Gold		Silver		Bronze	
50 metre freestyle	Lorrane Ferreira; Brazil	25.42	Andrea Berrino; Argentina	25.70	Stephanie Balduccini; Brazil	25.78
100 metre freestyle	Stephanie Balduccini; Brazil	54.99 GR	Giovanna Diamante; Brazil	55.40	Lucía Gauna; Argentina	56.88
200 metre freestyle	Stephanie Balduccini; Brazil	2:00.54	Giovanna Diamante; Brazil	2:01.86	María Yegres; Venezuela	2:02.53
400 metre freestyle	Maria Paula Heitmann; Brazil	4:14.48	Kristel Köbrich; Chile	4:16.28	Aline Rodrigues; Brazil	4:16.88
800 metre freestyle	Gabrielle Roncatto; Brazil	8:36.07	Kristel Köbrich; Chile	8:37.14	Malena Santillán; Argentina	8:43.72
1500 metre freestyle	Kristel Köbrich; Chile	16:15.43 GR	Beatriz Dizotti; Brazil	16:29.06	Gabrielle Roncatto; Brazil	16:50.72
50 metre backstroke	Andrea Berrino; Argentina	28.67 GR	Maria Luiza Pessanha; Brazil	29.50	Alexia Sotomayor; Peru	29.56
100 metre backstroke	Andrea Berrino; Argentina	1:01.59 GR	Maria Luiza Pessanha; Brazil	1:02.90	Alexia Sotomayor; Peru	1:03.07
200 metre backstroke	Malena Santillán; Argentina	2:13.32 GR	Alexia Assunção; Brazil	2:13.65	Alexia Sotomayor; Peru	2:13.80 NR
50 metre breaststroke	Jhennifer Conceição; Brazil	31.15 GR	Ana Carolina Vieira; Brazil	31.16	Macarena Ceballos; Argentina	31.26
100 metre breaststroke	Macarena Ceballos; Argentina	1:08.17 GR	Ana Carolina Vieira; Brazil	1:08.48	Jhennifer Conceição; Brazil	1:08.71
200 metre breaststroke	Gabrielle Assis; Brazil	2:28.34 GR	Macarena Ceballos; Argentina	2:29.48	Martina Barbeito; Argentina	2:31.64
50 metre butterfly	Giovanna Diamante; Brazil	26.88 GR	Sirena Rowe; Colombia	27.10	Valentina Becerra; Colombia	27.20
100 metre butterfly	Giovanna Diamante; Brazil	59.28 GR	Valentina Becerra; Colombia	1:00.12	Macarena Ceballos; Argentina	1:00.27 NR
200 metre butterfly	Giovanna Diamante; Brazil	2:12.45	Karen Durango; Colombia	2:13.27	Samantha Baños; Colombia	2:15.55
200 metre individual medley	Gabrielle Roncatto; Brazil	2:13.92 GR	Nathalia Almeida; Brazil	2:14.06	Florencia Perotti; Argentina	2:15.45
400 metre individual medley	Florencia Perotti; Argentina	4:46.49 GR	Gabrielle Roncatto; Brazil	4:49.56	Nathalia Almeida; Brazil	4:50.23
4 × 100 metre freestyle relay	Aline Rodrigues; Ana Carolina Vieira; Giovanna Diamante; Stephanie Balduccini; Brazil	3:43.07 GR	Andrea Berrino; Lucía Gauna; Macarena Ceballos; María Ruggiero; Argentina	3:47.72 NR	Alexia Sotomayor; Jessica Cattaneo; McKenna DeBever; Rafaela Erazo; Peru	3:49.08 NR
4 × 200 metre freestyle relay	Aline Rodrigues; Giovanna Diamante; Maria Paula Heitmann; Stephanie Balduccini; Brazil	8:09.77 GR	Agostina Hein; Delfina Dini; Lucía Gauna; Malena Santillán; Argentina	8:19.19	Daniela Gutiérrez; Karen Durango; Stefanía Gómez; Valentina Becerra; Colombia	8:20.14
4 × 100 metre medley relay	Maria Luiza Pessanha; Jhennifer Conceição; Giovanna Diamante; Stephanie Balduccini; Brazil	4:07.96 GR	Andrea Berrino; Martina Barbeito; Macarena Ceballos; María Ruggiero; Argentina	4:09.05	Jimena Leguizamón; Stefanía Gómez; Valentina Becerra; Karen Durango; Colombia	4:12.08

==== Mixed ====
Event	Gold		Silver		Bronze	
4 × 100 metres freestyle relay	Gabriel Santos; Giovanna Diamante; Stephanie Balduccini; Vinicius Assunção; Brazil	3:30.22 GR	Guido Buscaglia; Lucía Gauna; María Ruggiero; Roberto Strelkov; Argentina	3:33.01	Alberto Mestre; Alfonso Mestre; María Yegres; Mercedes Toledo; Venezuela	3:35.27
4 × 100 metres medley relay	Evandro Vinicius Silva; Giovanna Diamante; Guilherme Basseto; Stephanie Balduccini; Brazil	3:49.56 GR	Jorge Murillo; Karen Durango; Omar Pinzón; Valentina Becerra; Colombia	3:53.81	Andrea Berrino; Guido Buscaglia; Juan Carrocia; Macarena Ceballos; Argentina	3:54.09

== Participation ==
Fourteen nations participated in swimming events of the 2022 South American Games.

- Argentina
- Aruba
- Bolivia
- Brazil
- Chile
- Colombia
- Curaçao
- Ecuador
- Panama
- Paraguay
- Peru
- Suriname
- Uruguay
- Venezuela
