= 2018 Pan Pacific Swimming Championships – Men's 100 metre breaststroke =

Men's 100 metre breaststroke at the 2018 Pan Pacific Swimming Championships
- Venue: Tokyo Tatsumi International Swimming Center
- Dates: 9 August (heats & finals)
- Competitors: 16 from 8 nations
- Winning time: 59.08

Medalists
gold medal	Yasuhiro Koseki	Japan
silver medal	Jake Packard	Australia
bronze medal	João Gomes Júnior	Brazil

The men's 100 metre breaststroke competition at the 2018 Pan Pacific Swimming Championships took place on August 9 at the Tokyo Tatsumi International Swimming Center. The defending champion was Yasuhiro Koseki of Japan.

== Records ==
Prior to this competition, the existing world and Pan Pacific records were as follows:

World record	Adam Peaty (GBR)	57.10	Glasgow, United Kingdom	4 August 2018
Pan Pacific Championships record	Kosuke Kitajima (JPN)	59.04	Irvine, United States	19 August 2010

== Results ==
All times are in minutes and seconds.

KEY:	QA	Qualified A Final	QB	Qualified B Final	CR	Championships record	NR	National record	PB	Personal best	SB	Seasonal best

=== Heats ===
The first round was held on 9 August from 10:00.

Only two swimmers from each country may advance to the A or B final. If a country not qualify any swimmer to the A final, that same country may qualify up to three swimmers to the B final.

Rank	Name	Nationality	Time	Notes
1	Andrew Wilson	United States	59.42	QA
2	Wang Lizhuo	China	59.50	QA
3	Michael Andrew	United States	59.55	QA
4	Yasuhiro Koseki	Japan	59.67	QA
5	João Gomes Júnior	Brazil	59.74	QA
6	Jake Packard	Australia	59.81	QA
7	Matthew Wilson	Australia	59.90	QA
8	Josh Prenot	United States	1:00.22	QB
9	Zac Stubblety-Cook	Australia	1:00.32	QB
10	Richard Funk	Canada	1:00.33	QA
11	Ippei Watanabe	Japan	1:00.35	QB
12	Eli Wall	Canada	1:01.65	QB
13	Song Jiale	China	1:02.13	QB
14	Liu Yunsong	China	1:02.69	QB
15	Timothy Yen	Philippines	1:07.05	QB
16	Lennosuke Suzuki	Northern Mariana Islands	1:17.36	QB

=== B Final ===
The B final was held on 9 August from 17:30.

Rank	Name	Nationality	Time	Notes
9	Zac Stubblety-Cook	Australia	1:00.20	
10	Ippei Watanabe	Japan	1:00.49	
11	Josh Prenot	United States	1:00.63	
12	Song Jiale	China	1:01.52	
13	Liu Yunsong	China	1:01.97	
14	Eli Wall	Canada	1:02.03	
15	Timothy Yen	Philippines	1:08.55	
16	Lennosuke Suzuki	Northern Mariana Islands	1:16.51	

=== A Final ===
The A final was held on 9 August from 17:30.

Rank	Name	Nationality	Time	Notes
1st place, gold medalist(s)	Yasuhiro Koseki	Japan	59.08	
2nd place, silver medalist(s)	Jake Packard	Australia	59.20	
3rd place, bronze medalist(s)	João Gomes Júnior	Brazil	59.60	
4	Andrew Wilson	United States	59.70	
5	Wang Lizhuo	China	59.76	
6	Matthew Wilson	Australia	59.83	
7	Michael Andrew	United States	1:00.04	
8	Richard Funk	Canada	1:00.62	
