= Alberto Mestre (swimmer, born 1999) =

Venezuelan swimmer

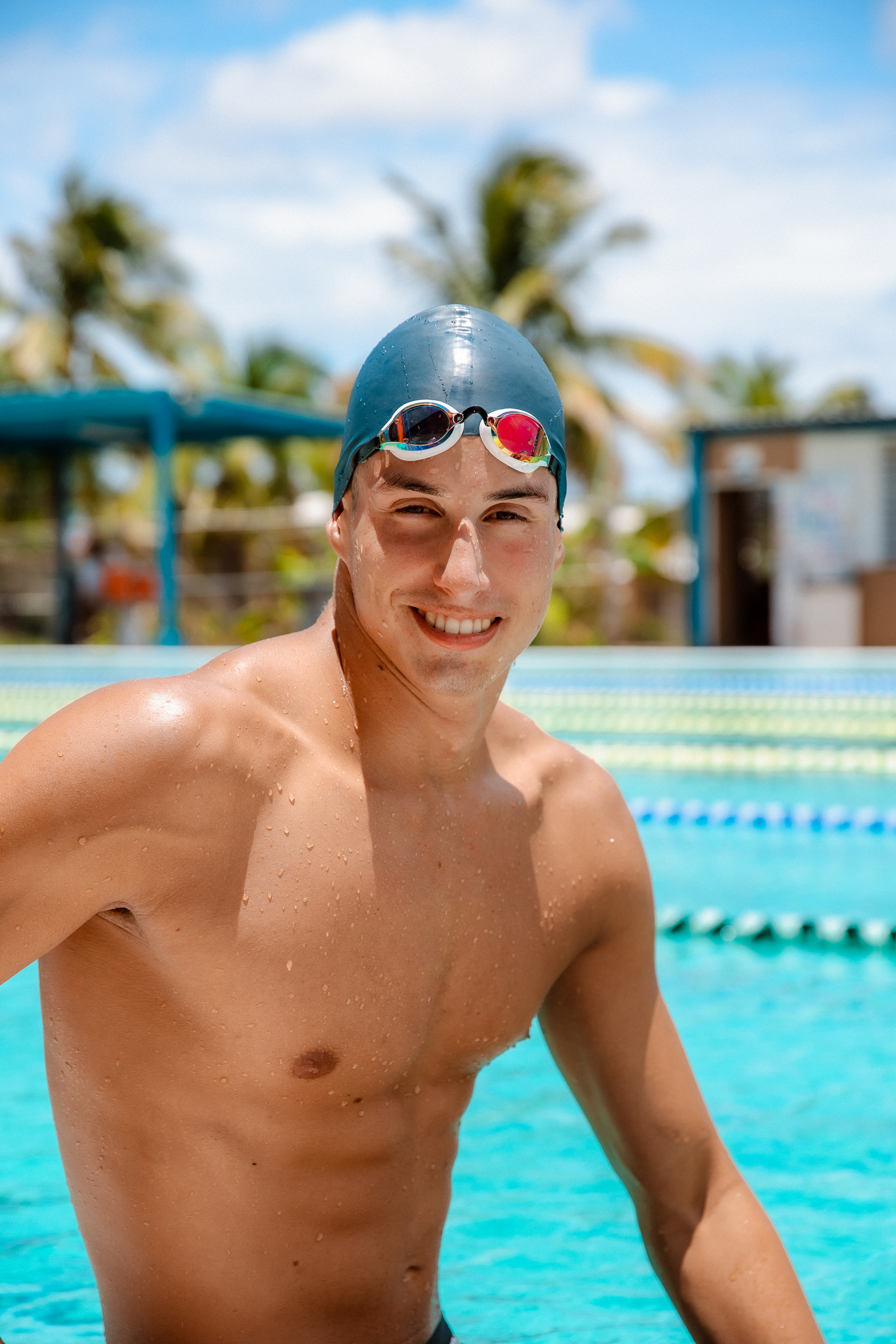
- Mestre in 2021

Personal information
- Born: 10 February 1999 (age 27) Caracas, Venezuela
- Height: 2.05 m (6 ft 9 in)

Sport
- Sport: Swimming
Medal record
Representing Venezuela
South American Games
Gold medal – first place	2018 Cochabamba	4x100m freestyle relay
Silver medal – second place	2022 Asuncion	4x100m freestyle relay
Bronze medal – third place	2022 Asuncion	50m freestyle
Bronze medal – third place	2022 Asuncion	4x200m freestyle relay

Alberto Abel Mestre Vivas (born 10 February 1999) is a Venezuelan swimmer. He competed in the men's 100 metre freestyle at the 2020 Summer Olympics.
