= Swimming at the 2022 World Aquatics Championships – 4 × 100 metre mixed medley relay =

4 × 100 metre mixed medley relay at the 2022 World Aquatics Championships
- Venue: Danube Arena
- Location: Budapest, Hungary
- Dates: 21 June (heats and final)
- Competitors: 140 from 31 nations
- Teams: 31
- Winning time: 3:38.79

Medalists
gold medal	Hunter Armstrong; Nic Fink; Torri Huske; Claire Curzan; Ryan Murphy; Lilly King; Michael Andrew; Erika Brown	United States
silver medal	Kaylee McKeown; Zac Stubblety-Cook; Matthew Temple; Shayna Jack; Isaac Cooper; Matthew Wilson; Brianna Throssell; Meg Harris	Australia
bronze medal	Kira Toussaint; Arno Kamminga; Nyls Korstanje; Marrit Steenbergen	Netherlands

The 4 × 100 metre mixed medley relay competition at the 2022 World Aquatics Championships was held on 21 June 2022.

== Records ==
Prior to the competition, the existing world and championship records were as follows.

World record	Great Britain	3:37.58	Tokyo, Japan	31 July 2021
Competition record	United States	3:38.56	Budapest, Hungary	26 July 2017

== Results ==
=== Heats ===
The heats were started at 10:13.

Rank	Heat	Lane	Nation	Swimmers	Time	Notes
1	4	3	United States	Ryan Murphy (52.40); Lilly King (1:06.79); Michael Andrew (50.69); Erika Brown (53.28)	3:43.16	Q
2	3	3	Netherlands	Kira Toussaint (1:00.45); Arno Kamminga (58.70); Nyls Korstanje (51.12); Marrit Steenbergen (53.21)	3:43.48	Q
3	4	4	Great Britain	Medi Harris (1:00.09); James Wilby (58.94); Jacob Peters (51.49); Anna Hopkin (53.12)	3:43.64	Q
4	4	5	Australia	Isaac Cooper (53.77); Matthew Wilson (1:00.27); Brianna Throssell (57.51); Meg Harris (53.03)	3:44.58	Q
5	3	4	China	Xu Jiayu (53.33); Yu Jingyao (1:06.73); Wang Changhao (51.23); Cheng Yujie (53.63)	3:44.92	Q
6	3	6	Japan	Ryosuke Irie (53.05); Reona Aoki (1:06.49); Naoki Mizunuma (50.92); Rika Omoto (54.62)	3:45.08	Q
7	3	5	Italy	Michele Lamberti (54.40); Arianna Castiglioni (1:05.82); Elena Di Liddo (57.83); Manuel Frigo (48.39)	3:46.44	Q
8	4	2	Germany	Ole Braunschweig (53.90); Anna Elendt (1:05.59); Angelina Köhler (58.06); Jan Eric Friese (48.99)	3:46.54	Q
9	4	7	Brazil	Guilherme Basseto (54.69); João Gomes Júnior (1:00.15); Giovanna Diamante (58.31); Stephanie Balduccini (54.92)	3:48.07	
10	4	6	Israel	Anastasia Gorbenko (1:00.08); Kristian Pitshugin (1:01.55); Tomer Frankel (51.71); Daria Golovaty (55.05)	3:48.39	
11	3	7	Canada	Javier Acevedo (54.80); Rachel Nicol (1:07.28); Katerine Savard (58.57); Yuri Kisil (48.28)	3:48.93	
12	3	2	Greece	Evangelos Makrygiannis (54.38); Konstantinos Meretsolias (1:00.35); Anna Ntountounaki (58.88); Theodora Drakou (55.52)	3:49.13	
13	1	5	Hong Kong	Stephanie Au (1:01.38); Adam Chillingworth (1:02.16); Nicholas Lim (54.27); Camille Cheng (56.47)	3:54.28	
14	2	0	Singapore	Quah Zheng Wen (55.26); Nicholas Mahabir (1:00.30); Letitia Sim (1:01.88); Amanda Lim (56.99)	3:54.43	
15	4	0	Latvia	Ģirts Feldbergs (55.65); Daniils Bobrovs (1:02.69); Ieva Maļuka (1:02.29); Gabriela Ņikitina (57.14)	3:57.77	NR
16	2	2	Chinese Taipei	Chuang Mu-lun (55.51); Wang Hsing-hao (1:03.33); Hsu An (1:02.65); Huang Mei-chien (56.64)	3:58.13	NR
17	4	8	Slovakia	Tamara Potocká (1:04.91); Nikoleta Trníková (1:10.14); Ádám Halás (54.02); Matej Duša (49.60)	3:58.67	
18	3	8	South Africa	Olivia Nel (1:03.35); Brenden Crawford (1:01.33); Clayton Jimmie (56.05); Stephanie Houtman (59.92)	4:00.65	
19	1	4	Vietnam	Nguyễn Quang Thuấn (59.87); Phạm Thanh Bảo (1:02.69); Lê Thị Mỹ Thảo (1:03.76); Võ Thị Mỹ Tiên (1:01.21)	4:07.53	
20	2	1	Thailand	Jinjutha Pholjamjumrus (1:08.22); Dulyawat Kaewsriyong (1:05.69); Navaphat Wongcharoen (54.08); Yarinda Sunthornrangsri (1:01.29)	4:09.28	
21	2	5	Morocco	Lina Khiyara (1:09.19); Imane El Baroudi (1:14.80); Samy Boutouil (54.53); Souhail Hamouchane (52.39)	4:10.91	
22	3	0	Bahamas	Lamar Taylor (58.58); Izaak Bastian (1:04.72); Zaylie Thompson (1:10.74); Lillian Higgs (1:01.15)	4:15.19	
23	2	7	Mongolia	Enkh-Amgalangiin Ariuntamir (1:08.56); Zandanbal Gunsennorov (1:08.74); Batbayaryn Enkhkhüslen (1:04.98); Batbayaryn Enkhtamir (53.04)	4:15.32	
24	2	4	Seychelles	Therese Soukup (1:11.96); Simon Bachmann (1:07.51); Mathieu Bachmann (57.36); Khema Elizabeth (1:02.38)	4:19.21	
25	4	9	Angola	Salvador Gordo (1:01.39); Maria Freitas (1:19.67); Lia Lima (1:06.72); Henrique Mascarenhas (52.99)	4:20.77	
26	1	3	Northern Mariana Islands	Juhn Tenorio (1:01.77); Maria Batallones (1:24.00); Taiyo Akimaru (1:02.22); Jinie Thompson (1:09.92)	4:37.91	
27	2	9	Guam	Benjamin Ko (1:03.63); Keana Santos (1:35.53); Mia Lee (1:12.81); Israel Poppe (55.13)	4:47.10	
28	1	6	Maldives	Aishath Sausan (1:18.58); Mubal Azzam Ibrahim (1:19.87); Mohamed Aan Hussain (1:07.09); Hamna Ahmed (1:12.52)	4:58.06	
	2	8	South Korea	Lee Ju-ho (54.40); Choi Dong-yeol (1:00.13); Kim Seo-yeong; Jeong So-eun	Disqualified	
	3	1	Lithuania	Erikas Grigaitis (55.27); Kotryna Teterevkova (1:08.16); Deividas Margevičius; Rūta Meilutytė	Disqualified	
	4	1	Estonia	Armin Evert Lelle (55.84); Eneli Jefimova; Alex Ahtiainen; Aleksa Gold	Disqualified	
	2	3	Uganda		Did not start	
	2	6	Tanzania		Did not start	
	3	9	Peru		Did not start	

=== Final ===
The final was held at 19:52.

Rank	Lane	Nation	Swimmers	Time	Notes
1st place, gold medalist(s)	4	United States	Hunter Armstrong (52.14); Nic Fink (57.86); Torri Huske (56.17); Claire Curzan (52.62)	3:38.79	
2nd place, silver medalist(s)	6	Australia	Kaylee McKeown (58.66); Zac Stubblety-Cook (58.92); Matthew Temple (50.84); Shayna Jack (52.92)	3:41.34	
3rd place, bronze medalist(s)	5	Netherlands	Kira Toussaint (59.72); Arno Kamminga (58.28); Nyls Korstanje (50.99); Marrit Steenbergen (52.55)	3:41.54	
4	3	Great Britain	Medi Harris (59.51); James Wilby (58.49); James Guy (50.95); Freya Anderson (52.70)	3:41.65	
5	1	Italy	Thomas Ceccon (52.26); Nicolò Martinenghi (57.93); Elena Di Liddo (57.72); Silvia Di Pietro (53.76)	3:41.67	
6	2	China	Xu Jiayu (52.90); Yan Zibei (59.25); Zhang Yufei (57.74); Cheng Yujie (53.66)	3:43.55	
7	7	Japan	Ryosuke Irie (52.97); Reona Aoki (1:07.10); Naoki Mizunuma (50.89); Rika Omoto (54.32)	3:45.28	
8	8	Germany	Ole Braunschweig (54.08); Anna Elendt (1:05.83); Angelina Köhler (58.39); Rafael Miroslaw (48.34)	3:46.64	
