= Swimming at the 2023 Pan American Games – Men's 200 metre butterfly =

Men's 200 metre butterfly at the 2023 Pan American Games
- Venue: Aquatic Centre
- Date: October 21, 2023
- Competitors: 17 from 10 nations

Medalists
Gold medal	Mason Laur	United States
Silver medal	Leonardo de Deus	Brazil
Bronze medal	Jack Dahlgren	United States

The men's 200 metre butterfly competition of the swimming events at the 2023 Pan American Games were held on October 21, 2023, at the Aquatic Center in Santiago, Chile.

== Records ==
Prior to this competition, the existing world and Pan American Games records were as follows:

World record	Kristof Milak (HUN)	1:50.34	Budapest, Hungary	June 21, 2022
Pan American Games record	Leonardo de Deus (BRA)	1:55.01	Toronto, Canada	July 14, 2015

== Results ==
KEY:	QA	Qualified for A final	QB	Qualified for B final	GR	Games record	NR	National record	PB	Personal best	SB	Seasonal best

=== Heats ===
The first round was held on October 21.

Rank	Heat	Lane	Name	Nationality	Time	Notes
1	3	4	Mason Laur	United States	1:57.58	QA
2	2	4	Jack Dahlgren	United States	1:58.51	QA
3	1	4	Leonardo de Deus	Brazil	1:59.09	QA
4	2	5	Héctor Ruvalcaba	Mexico	1:59.44	QA
5	1	6	Kevin Zhang	Canada	2:00.22	QA
6	1	5	Luiz Altamir Melo	Brazil	2:00.51	QA
7	1	3	Joaquín Piñero	Argentina	2:00.53	QA
8	3	3	Erick Gordillo	Independent Athletes Team	2:00.60	QA
9	2	2	David Arias	Colombia	2:01.14	QB
10	3	2	Roberto Bonilla	Independent Athletes Team	2:01.59	QB
11	3	5	Matheus Gonche	Brazil	2:01.77	QB
12	3	6	Federico Ludueña	Argentina	2:01.90	QB
13	2	3	Jorge Otaiza	Venezuela	2:03.31	QB
14	2	6	Ascanio Fernández	Mexico	2:03.64	QB
15	2	7	Xavier Ventura	El Salvador	2:06.84	QB
16	1	2	Carlos Vasquez	Honduras	2:06.86	QB
17	3	7	Gabriel Araya	Chile	2:08.55	

=== Final B ===
The B final was held on October 21.

Rank	Lane	Name	Nationality	Time	Notes
9	4	David Arias	Colombia	2:01.22	
10	5	Matheus Gonche	Brazil	2:01.28	
11	6	Ascanio Fernández	Mexico	2:02.16	
12	3	Federico Ludueña	Argentina	2:03.81	
13	7	Carlos Vasquez	Honduras	2:05.28	
14	2	Xavier Ventura	El Salvador	2:07.64	
		Gabriel Araya	Chile	DNS	

=== Final A ===
The A final was held on October 21.

Rank	Lane	Name	Nationality	Time	Notes
1st place, gold medalist(s)	4	Mason Laur	United States	1:56.44	
2nd place, silver medalist(s)	3	Leonardo de Deus	Brazil	1:57.25	
3rd place, bronze medalist(s)	5	Jack Dahlgren	United States	1:57.53	
4	6	Héctor Ruvalcaba	Mexico	1:58.63	
5	2	Kevin Zhang	Canada	1:59.30	
6	8	Erick Gordillo	Independent Athletes Team	1:59.52	
7	1	Joaquín Piñero	Argentina	2:00.00	
8	7	Luiz Altamir Melo	Brazil	2:01.27	
