= Matheus Gonche =

Brazilian swimmer (born 1999)

Personal information
- Full name: Matheus Ferreira de Moraes Gonche
- Nationality: Brazil
- Born: 5 January 1999 (age 27) Resende, Brazil
- Height: 1.82 m (6 ft 0 in)
- Weight: 83 kg (183 lb)

Sport
- Sport: Swimming
- Strokes: Butterfly
Medal record
Representing Brazil
South American Games
Gold medal – first place	2022 Asunción	100 m butterfly
Gold medal – first place	2022 Asunción	4x100 m medley
Silver medal – second place	2022 Asunción	200 m butterfly
Bronze medal – third place	2018 Cochabamba	100 m butterfly
World University Games
Bronze medal – third place	2021 Chengdu	4×200 m freestyle

Matheus Ferreira de Moraes Gonche (born 5 January 1999) is a Brazilian swimmer.

== Career ==
At the 2018 South American Games, Gonche won a bronze medal in the 100m butterfly.

He competed in the 2020 Summer Olympics, where he finished 43rd in the Men's 100 metre butterfly.

At the 2021 Summer World University Games, he won a bronze medal in the 4x200m freestyle relay.

At the Maria Lenk Trophy held in April 2022, he achieved the marks of 51.60 in the 100 m butterfly and 1:56.30 in the 200 m butterfly. With this, he was not only Brazilian champion in both events, but was ranked 7th in the world rankings in both events at that time.

He was at the 2022 World Aquatics Championships held in Budapest, Hungary, where he finished 10th in the Men's 4 × 100 metre medley relay, along with João Gomes Júnior, Guilherme Basseto and Luiz Gustavo Borges., 18th in the Men's 100 metre butterfly and 33rd in the Men's 200 metre butterfly.

Gonche won three medals at the 2022 South American Games: gold in the 100m butterfly and the 4x100m medley, and silver in the 200m butterfly.

At the 2023 Pan American Games, he finished 10th in the 200m butterfly.

At the 2024 World Aquatics Championships, Gonche reached a World Championship semifinal for the first time. He finished 13th in the 100 metre butterfly, with a mark of 52.12. He also finished 20th in the 200 metre butterfly.
