= Nathalia Almeida =

Brazilian swimmer (born 1996)

Nathalia Almeida OLY
Personal information
- Born: 14 December 1996 (age 29) Rio de Janeiro, Rio de Janeiro, Brazil

Sport
- Sport: Swimming
Medal record
Women's swimming
Representing Brazil
Pan American Games
Gold medal – first place	2023 Santiago	4×100 m mixed free
Silver medal – second place	2023 Santiago	4×200 m freestyle
South American Games
Silver medal – second place	2022 Asunción	200 m medley
Bronze medal – third place	2022 Asunción	400 m medley
South American Championships
Bronze medal – third place	2018 Trujillo	200 m butterfly

Nathalia Siqueira Almeida (born 14 December 1996) is a Brazilian swimmer. She competed in the women's 4 × 200 metre freestyle relay at the 2020 Summer Olympics.

In 2013, Almeida competed in the Junior Swimming World Championship and was fifth in the 4 × 100 m Freestyle and 4 × 200 m Freestyle. The following year, she won the gold medal in the South American Championship in Argentina in the 4 × 200 m Freestyle event and the bronze in the 200m Butterfly. In the pre-Olympic championship that defined the Brazilian team for the Rio 2016 Games, Nathalia came close to getting a place in the Olympics that year in the 200m medley. She won a gold medal at the 2018 World Military Championship in Russia. In the same season, she secured third place in the 200m Butterfly at the South American Championship in Peru (2018).

She competed in the 2020 Summer Olympics, where she finished 10th in the Women's 4 × 200 metre freestyle relay, along with Larissa Oliveira, Aline Rodrigues and Gabrielle Roncatto.

At the 2021 FINA World Swimming Championships (25 m) in Abu Dhabi, she finished 7th in the Women's 4 × 200 metre freestyle relay, along with Giovanna Diamante, Viviane Jungblut and Gabrielle Roncatto; 12th in the Women's 400 metre freestyle; 14th in the Women's 400 metre individual medley 19th in the Women's 200 metre individual medley, and 23rd in the Women's 100 metre individual medley.;

At the 2022 South American Games held in Asunción, Paraguay, she won a silver medal in the Women's 200 metre individual medley and a bronze medal in the Women's 400 metre individual medley.

At the 2023 Pan American Games held in Santiago, Chile, she won a gold medal in the Brazil's 4 × 100 m mixed freestyle relay, for swimming in the qualifying round of the event, and a silver medal in the Women's 4 × 200 m freestyle, where Brazil almost equaled the South American record.
