= Stephanie Balduccini =

Brazilian swimmer (born 2004)

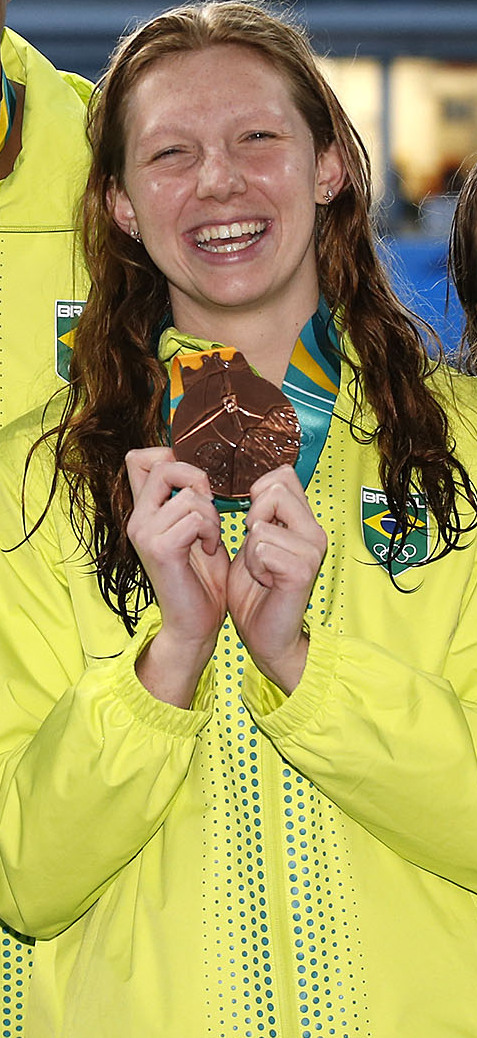
- Balduccini in 2023

Personal information
- Full name: Stephanie Balduccini
- National team: Brazil
- Born: 20 September 2004 (age 22) São Paulo, Brazil
- Height: 1.71 m (5 ft 7 in)
- Weight: 61 kg (134 lb)

Sport
- Sport: Swimming
- Strokes: freestyle
- College team: Michigan Wolverines
Medal record
Women's swimming
Representing Brazil
Pan American Games
Gold medal – first place	2023 Santiago	4×100 m mixed free
Silver medal – second place	2023 Santiago	100 m freestyle
Silver medal – second place	2023 Santiago	4×200 m freestyle
Bronze medal – third place	2023 Santiago	4×100 m freestyle
Bronze medal – third place	2023 Santiago	4×100 m mixed medley
South American Games
Gold medal – first place	2022 Asunción	100 m freestyle
Gold medal – first place	2022 Asunción	200 m freestyle
Gold medal – first place	2022 Asunción	4x100 m freestyle
Gold medal – first place	2022 Asunción	4x200 m freestyle
Gold medal – first place	2022 Asunción	4x100 m medley
Gold medal – first place	2022 Asunción	4x100 mixed free
Gold medal – first place	2022 Asunción	4x100 mixed medley
Bronze medal – third place	2022 Asunción	50 m freestyle
Junior Pan American Games
Gold medal – first place	2021 Cali/Valle	50 m freestyle
Gold medal – first place	2021 Cali/Valle	100 m freestyle
Gold medal – first place	2021 Cali/Valle	4 × 100 m freestyle relay
Gold medal – first place	2021 Cali/Valle	4 × 200 m freestyle relay
Gold medal – first place	2021 Cali/Valle	4 × 100 m medley relay
Gold medal – first place	2021 Cali/Valle	4 × 100 m mixed freestyle relay
Gold medal – first place	2021 Cali/Valle	4 × 100 m mixed medley relay
Gold medal – first place	2025 Asunción	4 × 100 metre freestyle relay
Gold medal – first place	2025 Asunción	200 meter freestyle
Gold medal – first place	2025 Asunción	4 × 100 metre mixed freestyle relay
Gold medal – first place	2025 Asunción	50 m freestyle
Gold medal – first place	2025 Asunción	100 m freestyle
Gold medal – first place	2025 Asunción	4 × 200 m freestyle relay
Gold medal – first place	2025 Asunción	4 × 100 m medley relay
Gold medal – first place	2025 Asunción	4 × 100 m mixed medley relay

Stephanie Balduccini (born 20 September 2004) is a Brazilian swimmer. She competed in the 2020 Summer Olympics at age 16. In the 100m freestyle, she finished 6th at the 2024 World Championships in Doha, and obtained a silver at the 2023 Pan American Games.

She is the daughter of Natalie, a British descendant who was born in Brazil, and Bruno. They both enrolled her in an English language school as a child, so the first language she learned was English, not Portuguese, which she later mastered. She began her career at Paineiras do Morumby club as a child. Her first international experience came in 2019, with the South American Youth Championship. She stood out by winning the 50-metre freestyle event in Chile. In the 2020 Brasil Swimming Trophy, she won the 50m freestyle event in the skins format.

== International career ==
=== 2020 Summer Olympics ===
Balduccini qualified for Tokyo 2020 as the youngest Olympic swimmer in Brazil in 41 years (Ricardo Prado competed in Moscow in 1980 at the age of 15). The Paineiras club swimmer was responsible for the last partial, in Brazil's time-taking, at the Olympic selective in April at Parque Maria Lenk in Rio de Janeiro. She helped the team finish fourth in the world repechage, with a time of 3:38.59, and stamp their passport to Tokyo.

At the 2020 Brazilian Olympic selective, she swam the 100 metre freestyle with a time of 55.03, a time that would be enough for a silver medal in the 2021 European Junior Championships.

At the 2020 Summer Olympics in Tokyo, Balduccini closed the Brazilian Women's 4 × 100 metre freestyle relay at heats, with a partial of 54.06 (the best in the team).

=== 2021–24 ===
In April 2022, she clocked a personal best of 1:57.77 to win the women’s 200 free at the Brazil Trophy, close to the South American record (1:57.28 obtained by Manuella Lyrio). She also clocked 54.64 in the 100m freestyle, a time close to Larissa Oliveira's South American record of 54.03.

At the age of 17, she was at the 2022 World Aquatics Championships held in Budapest, Hungary. Participating in the Brazilian 4 × 100 m freestyle relay, formed by Ana Carolina Vieira, Giovanna Diamante, Balduccini and Giovana Reis, she finished in 6th place with a time of 3:38.10. This was the first time Brazil had qualified a women's relay for a World Aquatics Championships final since 2009, and the best placement of the country in this race in Worlds at all times. She became the first Brazilian to go sub-54 in the women’s 4x100 freestyle relay. In the 200m freestyle, she qualified for the semifinals in 8th place, with a time of 1:57.81. In the semifinals, she finished in 12th place, with a time of 1:57.54, her best personal time, 0.26 s from the South American record, and the best placement in the history of Brazil in this competition at World Championships. In the 100m freestyle, she qualified for the semifinals in 15th place, with a time of 54.48. In the semifinals, she finished in 10th place, with a time of 54.10, her best personal time, 0.07 s from the South American record and the best placement in the history of Brazil in this competition at World Championships. In the Brazilian 4x200m freestyle relay, formed by Balduccini, Giovanna Diamante, Aline Rodrigues and Maria Paula Heitmann, she finished in 6th place with a time of 7:58.38. This was the best placement of Brazil in this race in Worlds at all times. In the 4 × 100 metre mixed freestyle relay, she finished 6th in the final, along with Gabriel Santos, Vinicius Assunção and Giovanna Diamante, breaking the South American record and equaling the best mark in Brazil obtained in 2015. In the 4 × 100 metre mixed medley relay, she finished 9th along with Guilherme Basseto, João Gomes Júnior and Giovanna Diamante. She also finished 19th in the Women's 200 metre individual medley.

At the 2022 FINA World Swimming Championships (25 m), in Melbourne, Australia, in the Women's 4 × 200 metre freestyle relay, she broke the South American record with a time of 7:48.42, along with Giovanna Diamante, Gabrielle Roncatto and Aline Rodrigues. Brazil's relay finished 7th in the final. She also finished 8h in the Mixed 4 × 50 metre freestyle relay final, 9th in the Women's 4 × 100 metre freestyle relay, 16th in the Women's 100 metre freestyle and in the Women's 200 metre freestyle, 20th in the Women's 100 metre individual medley, 25th in the Women's 200 metre individual medley and 28th in the Women's 50 metre freestyle.

At the 2023 World Aquatics Championships held in Fukuoka, Japan, she had a lower-than-expected participation, but reached the semifinals of the Women's 100 metre freestyle, finishing in 13th place. She also reached the final of the Women's 4 × 200 metre freestyle relay, finishing in 8th place and the final of the Mixed 4 × 100 metre freestyle relay, finishing in 6th place. She also finished 25th in the Women's 50 metre freestyle, 26th in the Women's 200 metre freestyle, 11th in the Women's 4 × 100 metre freestyle relay, 21st in the Women's 4 × 100 metre medley relay and 16th in the Mixed 4 × 100 metre medley relay. She left Brazil after the Fukuoka World Championships to begin studying and training at the University of Michigan.

The 2023 Pan American Games held in Santiago, Chile, once again motivated the youngest swimmer on the Brazilian swimming team. There were five medals won, including a silver in the 100m freestyle, where she was defeated only by Olympic medalist Maggie Mac Neil, and a gold in the Mixed 4 × 100 m freestyle relay where she was directly responsible for the victory, closing the relay with a split of 53.43, taking almost 1 second difference to the US relay. She also won silver in the 4 × 200 m freestyle relay where Brazil almost broke the South American record, narrowly losing to the USA, and bronze in the 4 × 100 m freestyle and 4 × 100 m mixed medley relays.

At the 2024 World Aquatics Championships, Balduccini managed to enter a World Championship final for the first time, in the 100 metre freestyle event. She qualified with a time of 54.07, her personal best, almost breaking the South American record. It was the first time that a Brazilian woman qualified for the final of this event at the World Championships. In the 100m freestyle final, Balduccini again broke her personal record, now with 54.05, finishing in a historic 6th place. In the 4 × 200 metre freestyle relay, the team composed of Balduccini, Maria Fernanda Costa, Aline Rodrigues and Gabrielle Roncatto obtained a historic result, reaching 4th place, Brazil's best placement in this event at the World Championships, destroying the South American record with the mark of 7:52.71. The quartet formed by Balduccini, Costa, Rodrigues and Ana Carolina Vieira also finished 6th in the 4x100m freestyle, equaling Brazil's best result in world championships in this event.

=== 2024 Olympic Games ===
At the 2024 Olympic Games in Paris, participating in the women's 4 × 200 m freestyle relay, she qualified for the final, finishing in 7th place.

=== 2024-28 ===
At the José Finkel Trophy, held in short course, in August 2024, she broke the South American record in short course (25m) in the 100m medley (1:00.15).

At the Maria Lenk Trophy in April 2025, she broke the South American record for the 100m freestyle with a time of 53.87. She also won the 200m freestyle with a time of 1:56.43, significantly lowering her personal best and coming close to the South American record of Maria Fernanda Costa.

During the 2025 Junior Pan American Games, Bulduccini won the gold medal at the 4 × 100 metre freestyle relay, competing alongside Fernanda Celidonio,Beatriz Bezerra and Julia Ariosa. In the Women’s 200 meter freestyle final, Balduccini won the gold medal and also set a new Junior Pan American record, completing the race in 1:58.83.

At the 2025 World Aquatics Championships, she finished 14th in the Women's 200 metre freestyle.

At the 2026 Pan Pacific Swimming Championships, she finished 8th in the 200m fresstyle and 11th in the 100m freestyle.

== Personal bests ==
As of April 23, 2025

Long course
Event	Time	Meet	Date	Note(s)
50 m freestyle	25.25	2023 Pan American Games	24 October 2023	
100 m freestyle	53.87	2025 Maria Lenk Trophy	23 April 2025	SA
200 m freestyle	1:56.43	2025 Maria Lenk Trophy	22 April 2025	
