= Giovanna Diamante =

Brazilian swimmer (born 1997)

Personal information
- Full name: Giovanna Tomanik Diamante
- Nationality: Brazil
- Born: June 26, 1997 (age 29) São Paulo, São Paulo, Brazil
- Height: 1.72 m (5 ft 8 in)
- Weight: 68 kg (150 lb)

Sport
- Sport: Swimming
- Strokes: Butterfly
- Club: Esporte Clube Pinheiros
Medal record
Women's swimming
Representing Brazil
Pan American Games
Gold medal – first place	2019 Lima	4×100 m mixed medley
Silver medal – second place	2023 Santiago	4×200 m freestyle
Bronze medal – third place	2019 Lima	4×100 m medley
Bronze medal – third place	2023 Santiago	4×100 m freestyle
Bronze medal – third place	2023 Santiago	4×100 m mixed medley
South American Games
Gold medal – first place	2022 Asunción	50 m butterfly
Gold medal – first place	2022 Asunción	100 m butterfly
Gold medal – first place	2022 Asunción	200 m butterfly
Gold medal – first place	2022 Asunción	4x100 m freestyle
Gold medal – first place	2022 Asunción	4x200 m freestyle
Gold medal – first place	2022 Asunción	4x100 m medley
Gold medal – first place	2022 Asunción	4x100 mixed free
Gold medal – first place	2022 Asunción	4x100 mixed medley
Silver medal – second place	2022 Asunción	100 m freestyle
Silver medal – second place	2022 Asunción	200 m freestyle
South American Championships
Gold medal – first place	2018 Trujillo	100 m butterfly
Gold medal – first place	2018 Trujillo	4×100 m medley
Silver medal – second place	2018 Trujillo	50 m butterfly
Silver medal – second place	2018 Trujillo	200 m butterfly
Silver medal – second place	2018 Trujillo	4×200 m freestyle
Military World Games
Silver medal – second place	2019 Wuhan	4x100m mixed medley
Bronze medal – third place	2019 Wuhan	4x200m free
Youth Olympic Games
Silver medal – second place	2014 Nanjing	4×100 m mixed freestyle

Giovanna Tomanik Diamante (born June 26, 1997 in São Paulo) is a Brazilian swimmer.

At the 2014 Summer Youth Olympics in Nanjing, she won a silver medal in the Mixed 4 × 100m freestyle relay. She also finished 4th in the Mixed 4 × 100 metre medley relay; 5th in the Girls' 4 × 100 metre freestyle relay; 8th in the Girls' 50 metre butterfly; 10th in the Girls' 100 metre butterfly; 15th in the Girls' 200 metre butterfly; and 20th in the Girls' 200 metre freestyle.

At the 2019 Pan American Games held in Lima, Peru, she won a gold medal in the Mixed 4 × 100 metre medley relay, and a bronze medal in the Women's 4 × 100 metre medley relay. She also finished 4th in the Women's 100 metre butterfly and 11th in the Women's 200 metre butterfly.

She has qualified to represent Brazil at the 2020 Summer Olympics.

At the 2020 Summer Olympics in Tokyo, she finished 14th in the Mixed 4 × 100 metre medley relay, along with Guilherme Basseto, Felipe Lima and Stephanie Balduccini.

On 25 April 2021, while swimming the 4x100m mixed medley relay at the Brazilian Olympic Selection Trials, she broke the South American record with a time of 3:45.51, along with Felipe Lima, Guilherme Basseto and Larissa Oliveira.

At the 2021 FINA World Swimming Championships (25 m) in Abu Dhabi, she finished 7th in the Women's 4 × 200 metre freestyle relay, along with Nathalia Almeida, Viviane Jungblut and Gabrielle Roncatto; 12th in the Women's 100 metre butterfly; 11th in the Women's 200 metre butterfly. and 18th in the Women's 50 metre butterfly.

She was at the 2022 World Aquatics Championships held in Budapest, Hungary. Participating in the Brazilian 4x100m freestyle relay, formed by Ana Carolina Vieira, Stephanie Balduccini, Diamante and Giovana Reis, she finished in 6th place with a time of 3:38.10. This was the first time Brazil had qualified a women's relay for a World Aquatics Championships final since 2009, and the best placement of the country in this race in Worlds at all times. In the Brazilian 4x200m freestyle relay, formed by Diamante, Stephanie Balduccini, Aline Rodrigues and Maria Paula Heitmann, she finished in 6th place with a time of 7:58.38. This was the best placement of Brazil in this race in Worlds at all times. In the 4 × 100 metre mixed freestyle relay, she finished 6th in the final, along with Gabriel Santos, Vinicius Assunção and Stephanie Balduccini, breaking the South American record and equaling the best mark in Brazil obtained in 2015. In the 4 × 100 metre mixed medley relay, she finished 9th along with Guilherme Basseto, João Gomes Júnior and Stephanie Balduccini. She also finished 10th in the Women's 100 metre butterfly, 10th in the Women's 4 × 100 metre medley relay, 18th in the Women's 200 metre butterfly and 22nd in the Women's 50 metre butterfly.

At the 2022 FINA World Swimming Championships (25 m), in Melbourne, Australia, in the Women's 4 × 200 metre freestyle relay, she broke the South American record with a time of 7:48.42, along with Stephanie Balduccini, Gabrielle Roncatto and Aline Rodrigues. Brazil's relay finished 7th in the final. She also finished 8h in the Mixed 4 × 50 metre freestyle relay final, 9th in the Women's 4 × 100 metre freestyle relay, 12th in the Women's 100 metre butterfly, 16th in the Women's 200 metre butterfly, 18th in the Women's 200 metre freestyle, and 26th in the Women's 50 metre butterfly.
