= Maria Paula Heitmann =

Brazilian swimmer (born 1999)

Personal information
- Full name: Maria Paula Mangabeira Heitmann
- Nickname: MP
- Nationality: Brazil
- Born: 31 January 1999 (age 27) Belo Horizonte, Minas Gerais, Brazil
- Height: 1.63 m (5 ft 4 in)

Sport
- Sport: Swimming
- Strokes: Freestyle
- Club: Unisanta
- College team: Indiana University Bloomington
Medal record
Women's swimming
Representing Brazil
Pan American Games
Silver medal – second place	2023 Santiago	4×200 m freestyle
South American Games
Gold medal – first place	2022 Asunción	400 m freestyle
Gold medal – first place	2022 Asunción	4x200 m freestyle

Maria Paula Mangabeira Heitmann (born 31 January 1999 in Belo Horizonte) is a Brazilian swimmer.

She was at the 2017 Summer Universiade in Taipei, Taiwan.

At the 2018 José Finkel Trophy, she broke the South American record in 4×200m freestyle relay with a time of 7:50.57 along with Ana Carolina Vieira, Camila Mello and Andressa Cholodovskis.

She was at the 2022 World Aquatics Championships held in Budapest, Hungary. In the Brazilian 4x200m freestyle relay, formed by Heitmann, Giovanna Diamante, Aline Rodrigues and Stephanie Balduccini, she finished in 6th place with a time of 7:58.38. This was the best placement of Brazil in this race in Worlds at all times.

On 13 September 2022, at the José Finkel Trophy in Recife, she broke the short course South American record in the 400-metre freestyle, with a time of 4:03.45.
