= Gabrielle Roncatto =

Brazilian swimmer (born 1998)

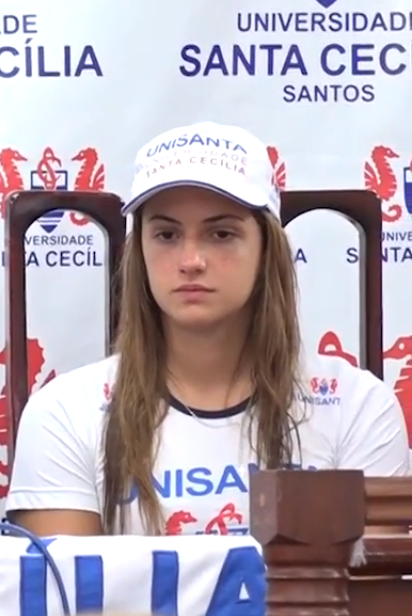
- Roncatto in 2016

Personal information
- Full name: Gabrielle Gonçalves Roncatto
- Nationality: Brazil
- Born: 19 July 1998 (age 28) São Paulo, São Paulo, Brazil
- Height: 1.65 m (5 ft 5 in)
- Weight: 60 kg (132 lb)

Sport
- Sport: Swimming
- Strokes: Freestyle, Medley
Medal record
Women's swimming
Representing Brazil
Pan American Games
Silver medal – second place	2015 Toronto	4×200 m freestyle
Silver medal – second place	2023 Santiago	4×200 m freestyle
Bronze medal – third place	2019 Lima	4×200 m freestyle
Bronze medal – third place	2023 Santiago	400 m freestyle
Bronze medal – third place	2023 Santiago	400 m medley
South American Games
Gold medal – first place	2018 Cochabamba	200 m freestyle
Gold medal – first place	2018 Cochabamba	200 m medley
Gold medal – first place	2018 Cochabamba	400 m medley
Gold medal – first place	2018 Cochabamba	4x200 m freestyle
Gold medal – first place	2022 Asunción	800 m freestyle
Gold medal – first place	2022 Asunción	200 m medley
Silver medal – second place	2018 Cochabamba	400 m freestyle
Silver medal – second place	2022 Asunción	400 m medley
Bronze medal – third place	2022 Asunción	1500 m freestyle

Gabrielle Gonçalves Roncatto (born 19 July 1998 in São Paulo) is a Brazilian swimmer. She finished 5th in the 400m freestyle at the 2024 Doha World Championships.

== International career ==
=== 2014–16 ===
On 3 September 2014, participating in the José Finkel Trophy (short course competition) in Guaratinguetá, she broke the South American record in the 4x200-metre freestyle with a time of 7:58.54, along with Larissa Oliveira, Aline Rodrigues and Daniele de Jesus.

In April 2015, participating in the Maria Lenk Trophy in Rio de Janeiro, she broke the South American record in the 4 × 200 metre freestyle relay with a time of 8:03.22, along with Manuella Lyrio, Larissa Oliveira and Joanna Maranhão.

At the 2015 South American Swimming Youth Championships, held in Lima, Peru, Roncatto won a gold medal in the 100-metre freestyle.

Approaching her 17th birthday, Roncatto participated in the 2015 Pan American Games in Toronto, Ontario, Canada, where she won a silver medal in the 4 × 200 metre freestyle relay, by participating at the heats. She also finished 10th in the 400 metre individual medley and 7th in the 200 metre individual medley.

=== 2016 Summer Olympics ===
At the 2016 Summer Olympics, in the 4 × 200 metre freestyle relay, she broke the South American record with a time of 7:55.68, along with Manuella Lyrio, Jéssica Cavalheiro and Larissa Oliveira, finishing 11th.

=== 2016–20 ===
At the 2019 Pan American Games held in Lima, Peru, Roncatto won a bronze medal in the 4 × 200 metre freestyle relay. She also finished 13th in the 200 metre individual medley.

=== 2020-2024 ===
In May 2022, she broke the Brazilian record in the 400-metre freestyle with a time of 4:08.91.

At the 2022 FINA World Swimming Championships (25 m), in Melbourne, Australia, in the Women's 4 × 200 metre freestyle relay, she broke the South American record with a time of 7:48.42, along with Giovanna Diamante, Stephanie Balduccini and Aline Rodrigues. Brazil's relay finished 7th in the final. She also finished 8th in the Women's 800 metre freestyle, 9th in the Women's 4 × 100 metre freestyle relay, 12th in the Women's 1500 metre freestyle. and 13th in the Women's 400 metre freestyle.

On 30 May 2023, she broke the Brazilian record in the 400m freestyle, with a time of 4:06.25.

At the 2023 World Aquatics Championships, she finished 8th in the 4 × 200 metre freestyle relay, 11th in the 400 metre freestyle, 27th in the 800 metre freestyle and 27th in the 400 metre individual medley.

At the 2023 Pan American Games, she won a silver medal in the Women's 4 × 200 metre freestyle relay, a bronze medal in the 400 metre freestyle and in the 400 metre individual medley and finished 7th in the 200 metre individual medley and 800 metre freestyle.

At the 2024 World Aquatics Championships, she qualified for the 400m freestyle final with the 6th best time (4:06.13). It was the first time that a Brazilian reached the final of the 400m freestyle at the World Championships - Roncatto reached the final together with her compatriot Maria Fernanda Costa, who qualified with the 4th best time, breaking the South American record. In the final, Roncatto again excelled, taking 5th place with a time of 4:04.18. In the 4 × 200 metre freestyle relay, the team composed of Roncatto, Maria Fernanda Costa, Stephanie Balduccini, and Aline Rodrigues obtained a historic result, reaching 4th place, Brazil's best placement in this event at the World Championships, destroying the South American record with the mark of 7:52.71.

On May 7, 2024, competing in the Brazilian Olympic Swimming Trials, ran her personal best in the 200m freestyle, 1:58.57.

== Personal bests ==
As of May 7, 2024

Long course
Event	Time	Meet	Date	Note(s)
200 m freestyle	1:58.57	2024 Brazilian Olympic Swimming Trials	May 7, 2024	
400 m freestyle	4:04.18	2024 World Championships	February 11, 2024	
