= João Gomes Júnior =

Brazilian swimmer (born 1986)

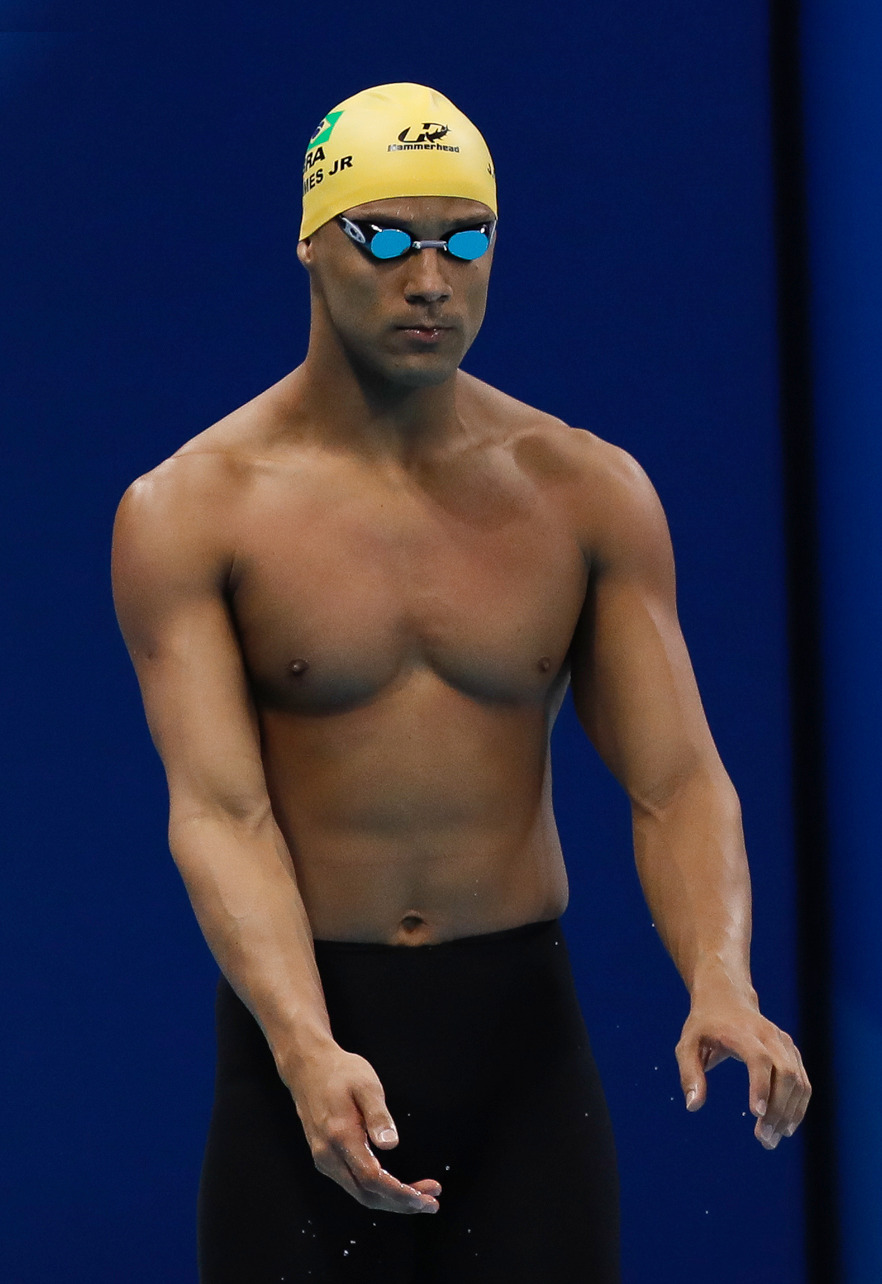
- Gomes at the 2016 Olympics

Personal information
- Full name: João Luiz Gomes Júnior
- Born: 21 January 1986 (age 40) Vitória, Espírito Santo, Brazil
- Height: 1.90 m (6 ft 3 in)
- Weight: 89 kg (196 lb)

Sport
- Sport: Swimming
- Strokes: Breaststroke
- Club: Pinheiros
- Coach: Mirco Cevales
Medal record
Representing Brazil
World Championships (LC)
Silver medal – second place	2017 Budapest	50 m breaststroke
Bronze medal – third place	2019 Gwangju	50 m breaststroke
World Championships (SC)
Bronze medal – third place	2021 Abu Dhabi	50 m breaststroke
Pan Pacific Championships
Bronze medal – third place	2018 Tokyo	100 m breaststroke
Pan American Games
Gold medal – first place	2019 Lima	100 m breaststroke
Gold medal – first place	2019 Lima	4×100 m mixed medley
Silver medal – second place	2019 Lima	4×100 m medley
Silver medal – second place	2023 Santiago	4×100 m medley
Bronze medal – third place	2023 Santiago	4×100 m mixed medley
Universiade
Silver medal – second place	2011 Shenzhen	50 m breaststroke
Bronze medal – third place	2011 Shenzhen	100 m breaststroke
South American Games
Silver medal – second place	2010 Medellín	50 m breaststroke
Bronze medal – third place	2010 Medellín	100 m breaststroke
Military World Games
Gold medal – first place	2019 Wuhan	50 m breaststroke

João Luiz Gomes Júnior (born 21 January 1986) is a Brazilian breaststroke swimmer.

== International career ==
=== 2009–12 ===
He was in the Brazilian national delegation who attended the 2009 World Aquatics Championships in Rome, where he competed in the 50-metre and 100-metre breaststroke. He went to the 50-metre breaststroke final, finishing in 7th place. He also finished 30th in the 100-metre breaststroke.

Gomes got the gold medal at the 2009 Paris Open, in the 50-metre breaststroke.

At the 2010 South American Games, he won the silver medal in the 50-metre breaststroke, and bronze in the 100-metre breaststroke.

He was at the 2010 Pan Pacific Swimming Championships in Irvine, where he finished 7th in the 50-metre breaststroke, and 13th in the 100-metre breaststroke.

At the 2010 FINA World Swimming Championships (25 m) in Dubai, João finished 11th in the 50-metre breaststroke.

Participating in the 2011 Summer Universiade, João was silver medal in the 50-metre breaststroke, and bronze in the 100-metre breaststroke.

At the 2012 FINA World Swimming Championships (25 m), in Istanbul, João was very close to getting a historic medal. He finished in 4th place in the 50-metre breaststroke and 11th in the 100-metre breaststroke, and helped Brazil's 4×100-metre medley to go to the final where the relay finished in 4th place.

=== 2013–16 ===
At the 2013 World Aquatics Championships in Barcelona, João finished 14th in the 100-metre breaststroke. In the 50-metre breaststroke, he qualified in third place for the final, with a time of 27.05 seconds. In the final, finished 5th, with a time of 27.20 seconds.

At the 2014 Pan Pacific Swimming Championships in Gold Coast, Queensland, Australia, he finished 10th in the 100-metre breaststroke.

At the 2014 FINA World Swimming Championships (25 m) in Doha, Qatar, João won three gold medals in three Brazilian relays, by participating at heats, in the men's 4 × 50 metre medley relay, in the men's 4 × 100 metre medley relay, and in the 4 × 50 metre mixed medley relay. João also finished 8th in the men's 50 metre breaststroke and 23rd in the men's 100 metre breaststroke. On 4 December 2014, João was tested positive for hydrochlorothiazide, a so-called "specified substance" which may be used to mask performance-enhancing drugs. All his results achieved on or after 4 December 2014 shall be annulled. The results of the Brazilian relays obtained were not cancelled.

At the 2016 Maria Lenk Trophy, he classified to the 2016 Summer Olympics in Rio de Janeiro, with a time of 59.06 in the 100-meter breaststroke, second best time in the world in the year, almost breaking the Henrique Barbosa's South American record of 59.03, obtained in 2009 with technological supersuits.

=== 2016 Summer Olympics ===
At the 2016 Summer Olympics, he finished 5th in the men's 100 metre breaststroke final. He also finished 6th in the men's 4 × 100 metre medley relay.

=== 2017–2020 ===
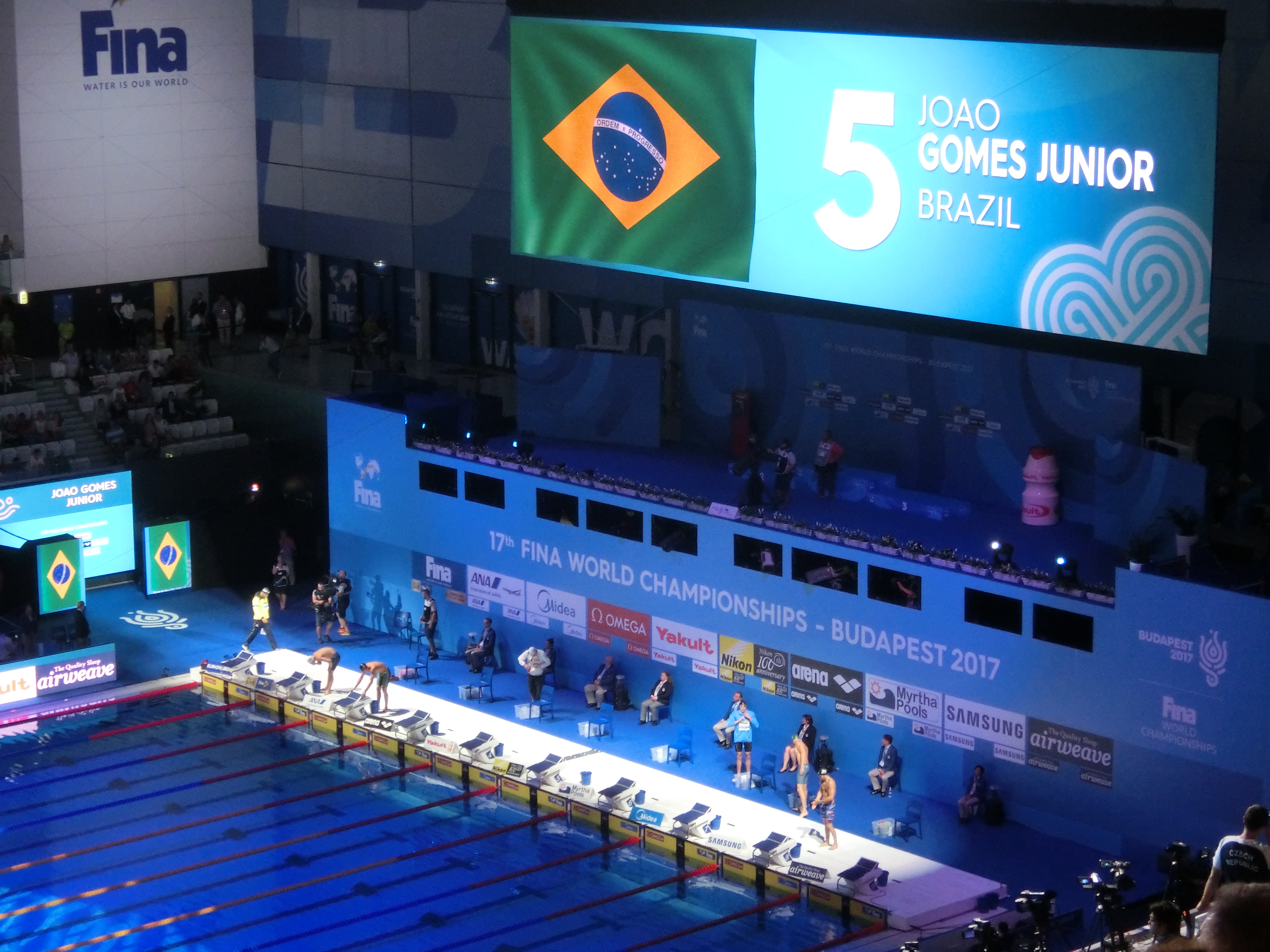
João Gomes in the 50 metre breaststroke at the 2017 World Aquatics Championships, where he won the silver medal

At the 2017 World Aquatics Championships in Budapest, in the Men's 50 metre breaststroke, he broke two times the Americas record, with 26.67 at heats and 26.52 in the final, to obtain the silver medal. He also finished 11th in the Men's 100 metre breaststroke, and 5th In the Men's 4 × 100 metre medley relay, along with Henrique Martins, Guilherme Guido and Marcelo Chierighini.

At the 2018 Pan Pacific Swimming Championships in Japan, he won a bronze medal in the 100-metre breaststroke, with a time of 59.60.

At the 2018 FINA World Swimming Championships (25 m) in Hangzhou, China, he finished 6th in the Men's 50 metre breaststroke, 9th in the Mixed 4 × 50 metre medley relay, and 11th in the Men's 100 metre breaststroke.

At the 2019 Maria Lenk Trophy, he broke the Americas record in the 50 metre breaststroke, with a time of 26.42.

At the 2019 World Aquatics Championships in Gwangju, South Korea, he won the bronze medal in the Men's 50 metre breaststroke. It was the first time that Brazil got two medals in the same event, in a World Championship: Felipe Lima got the silver. In the Men's 4 × 100 metre medley relay, he finished 6th, helping Brazil qualify for the Tokyo 2020 Olympics. He also finished 11th in the Men's 100 metre breaststroke.

At the 2019 Pan American Games held in Lima, Peru, João Gomes Jr. debuts in Pan American Games late but efficiently, earning gold in the Men's 100 metre breaststroke by defeating Olympic medalist Cody Miller, and the 2017 World's runner-up Kevin Cordes, with a time of 59.51. He also won a gold medal in the Mixed 4 × 100 metre medley relay, and a silver medal in the Men's 4 × 100 metre medley relay.

=== 2021–24 ===
At the 2021 FINA World Swimming Championships (25 m) in Abu Dhabi, United Arab Emirates, in the Men's 50 metre breaststroke, close to his 36 year old birthday, he won a bronze medal, with a time of 25.80. He also finished 4th in the Men's 4 × 50 metre medley relay.

At the 2022 World Aquatics Championships held in Budapest, Hungary, he qualified 3rd at heats, but was disqualified in the semifinals of the Men's 50 metre breaststroke. He also finished 9th in the 4 × 100 metre mixed medley relay, along with Guilherme Basseto, Giovanna Diamante and Stephanie Balduccini and 10th in the Men's 4 × 100 metre medley relay, along with Guilherme Basseto, Matheus Gonche and Luiz Gustavo Borges.

At the 2022 FINA World Swimming Championships (25 m), in Melbourne, Australia, he suffered a disqualification in the heats of the Men's 50 metre breaststroke.

At the 2023 World Aquatics Championships, in Fukuoka, Japan, at the age of 37, he finished 7th in the Men's 50 metre breaststroke.
