= Guilherme Basseto =

Brazilian swimmer (born 1997)

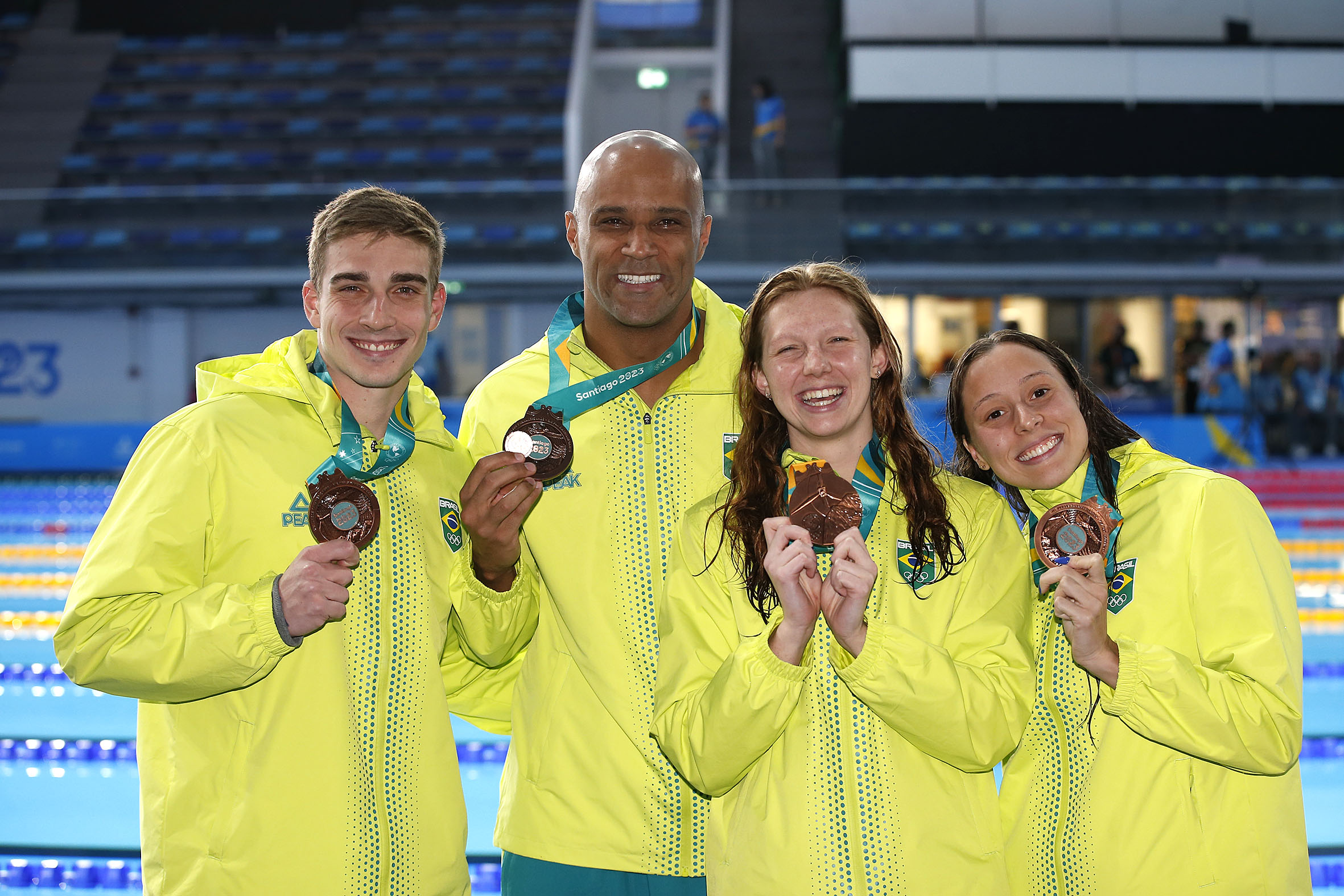
- Basseto (left)

Personal information
- Born: 12 March 1997 (age 29) Ribeirão Preto, São Paulo, Brazil
- Height: 1.83 m (6 ft 0 in)
- Weight: 80 kg (176 lb)

Sport
- Sport: Swimming
- Strokes: Backstroke
Medal record
Men's swimming
Representing Brazil
Pan American Games
Silver medal – second place	2023 Santiago	4×100 m medley
Bronze medal – third place	2023 Santiago	4×100 m mixed medley
South American Games
Gold medal – first place	2022 Asunción	50 m backstroke
Gold medal – first place	2022 Asunción	4×100 m medley
Gold medal – first place	2022 Asunción	4×100 m mixed medley
Silver medal – second place	2022 Asunción	100 m backstroke
Military World Games
Gold medal – first place	2019 Wuhan	50 m backstroke
Silver medal – second place	2019 Wuhan	100 m backstroke
Silver medal – second place	2019 Wuhan	4×100m mixed medley
Universiade
Bronze medal – third place	2019 Naples	4×100m medley

Guilherme Dias Massê Basseto (born 12 March 1997) is a Brazilian swimmer.

He was at the 2017 Summer Universiade in Taipei, Taiwan.

He competed in the men's 50 metre backstroke and in the men's 100 metre backstroke events at the 2018 FINA World Swimming Championships (25 m), in Hangzhou, China, reaching the semifinals of both (finished 13th in both).

On 25 April 2021, while swimming the 4 × 100 m mixed medley relay at the Brazilian Olympic Selection Trials, he broke the South American record with a time of 3:45.51, along with Felipe Lima, Giovanna Diamante and Larissa Oliveira.

In June 2021, he qualified to represent Brazil at the 2020 Summer Olympics.

At the 2020 Summer Olympics in Tokyo, he finished 14th in the Mixed 4 × 100 metre medley relay, along with Giovanna Diamante, Felipe Lima and Stephanie Balduccini and 20th in the Men's 100 metre backstroke.

He was at the 2022 World Aquatics Championships held in Budapest, Hungary. In the 4 × 100 metre mixed medley relay, he finished 9th along with Giovanna Diamante, João Gomes Júnior and Stephanie Balduccini. She also finished 10th in the Men's 50 metre backstroke and 10th in the Men's 4 × 100 metre medley relay, along with João Gomes Júnior, Matheus Gonche and Luiz Gustavo Borges.
