= Ana Carolina Vieira (swimmer) =

Brazilian swimmer (born 2001)

Personal information
- Full name: Ana Carolina Vieira
- Nationality: Brazil
- Born: October 24, 2001 (age 24) São Paulo, São Paulo, Brazil
- Height: 1.70 m (5 ft 7 in)
- Weight: 63 kg (139 lb)

Sport
- Sport: Swimming
- Strokes: Breaststroke, freestyle
- Club: Minas TC
Medal record
Representing Brazil
Pan American Games
Gold medal – first place	2023 Santiago	4×100 m mixed free
Bronze medal – third place	2023 Santiago	4×100 m freestyle
South American Games
Gold medal – first place	2018 Cochabamba	100 m breaststroke
Gold medal – first place	2018 Cochabamba	4×100 m freestyle
Gold medal – first place	2018 Cochabamba	4×200 m freestyle
Gold medal – first place	2018 Cochabamba	4×100 m medley
Gold medal – first place	2022 Asunción	4x100 m freestyle
Silver medal – second place	2022 Asunción	50 m breaststroke
Silver medal – second place	2022 Asunción	100 m breaststroke
Youth Olympic Games
Silver medal – second place	2018 Buenos Aires	4×100 m freestyle
Silver medal – second place	2018 Buenos Aires	4×100 m mixed freestyle

Ana Carolina Vieira (born October 24, 2001 in São Paulo) is a Brazilian swimmer. She represented Brazil at the 2020 Summer Olympics.

== Career ==
At the 2018 José Finkel Trophy, she broke the South American record in 4 × 200 m freestyle relay with a time of 7:50.57 along with Camila Mello, Maria Paula Heitmann and Andressa Cholodovskis.

At the 2018 Summer Youth Olympics held in Buenos Aires, she won a silver medal in the Girls' 4 × 100 metre freestyle relay. It was the first time that a Brazil's women's relay won a swimming medal on a world level. She also won another silver medal in the Mixed 4 × 100 metre freestyle relay, finished 4th in the Girls' 4 × 100 metre medley relay, 18th in the Girls' 100 metre freestyle, 28th in the Girls' 200 metre freestyle and 32nd in the Girls' 100 metre breaststroke.

Vieira represented Brazil at the 2020 Summer Olympics in the women's 4 × 100 metre freestyle relay event, finishing 12th.

She was at the 2022 World Aquatics Championships held in Budapest, Hungary. Participating in the Brazilian 4 × 100 m freestyle relay, formed by Giovanna Diamante, Stephanie Balduccini, Vieira and Giovana Reis, she finished in 6th place with a time of 3:38.10. This was the first time Brazil had qualified a women's relay for a World Aquatics Championships final since 2009, and the best placement of the country in this race in Worlds at all times. She also finished 10th in the Women's 4 × 100 metre medley relay, along with Stephanie Balduccini, Jhennifer Conceição and Giovanna Diamante.

At the 2024 World Aquatics Championships, The quartet formed by Vieira, Maria Fernanda Costa, Stephanie Balduccini and Aline Rodrigues finished 6th in the 4 × 100 m freestyle, equaling Brazil's best result in world championships in this event.

At the 2024 Summer Olympics, Viera was sent home from Paris by the Brazilian Olympic Committee for challenging a relay lineup-related decision in a disrespectful and aggressive manner. This is not the first time that Viera has gotten into trouble at a swim meet, as in 2023, she had a dispute with her countrymate Jhennifer Conceicao at the Trofeu Brasil competition.
