= Venezuela at the 2022 World Aquatics Championships =

- Flag of Venezuela
- FINA code: VEN
- National federation: Venezuelan Water Sports Federation
- Website: feveda.org.ve (in Spanish)

in Budapest, Hungary 18 June 2022 – 3 July 2022
- Competitors: 4 in 2 sports
- Medals Ranked 0th: Gold 0 Silver 0 Bronze 0 Total 0

World Aquatics Championships appearances
- 1973; 1975; 1978; 1982; 1986; 1991; 1994; 1998; 2001; 2003; 2005; 2007; 2009; 2011; 2013; 2015; 2017; 2019; 2022; 2023; 2024

Venezuela competed at the 2022 World Aquatics Championships in Budapest, Hungary from 18 June to 3 July.

== Athletes by discipline ==
The following is the list of number of competitors participating at the Championships per discipline.

Sport	Men	Women	Total
Artistic swimming	0	0	0
Diving	1	0	0
Open water swimming	0	0	0
Swimming	2	1	2
Water polo	0	0	0
Total	3	1	4

== Diving ==
Men

Athlete	Event	Preliminaries		Semifinals		Final	
Athlete	Event	Points	Rank	Points	Rank	Points	Rank
Jesús González	3 m springboard	283.90	44	did not advance			
Jesús González	10 m platform	310.00	29	did not advance			

== Swimming ==
Men

Athlete	Event	Heat		Semifinal		Final	
Athlete	Event	Time	Rank	Time	Rank	Time	Rank
Alberto Mestre	50 m freestyle	22.12	16 Q	22.13	16	did not advance	
Alberto Mestre	100 m freestyle	49.59	35	did not advance			
Jorge Otaiza	100 m butterfly	52.78	=25	did not advance			
Jorge Otaiza	200 m butterfly	1:58.54	23	did not advance			

Women

Athlete	Event	Heat		Semifinal		Final	
Athlete	Event	Time	Rank	Time	Rank	Time	Rank
Lismar Lyon	50 m butterfly	26.93	25	did not advance			
