= Open water swimming at the 2022 World Aquatics Championships – Men's 25 km =

2022 swimming competition

Men's 25 km at the 2022 World Aquatics Championships
- Venue: Lake Lupa
- Location: Hungary
- Dates: 30 June
- Competitors: 25 from 17 nations
- Winning time: 5:02:21.5

Medalists
gold medal	Dario Verani	Italy
silver medal	Axel Reymond	France
bronze medal	Péter Gálicz	Hungary

The Men's 25 km competition at the 2022 World Aquatics Championships was held on 30 June 2022.

== Results ==
The race was started at 07:00.

Rank	Swimmer	Nationality	Time
1st place, gold medalist(s)	Dario Verani	Italy	5:02:21.5
2nd place, silver medalist(s)	Axel Reymond	France	5:02:22.7
3rd place, bronze medalist(s)	Péter Gálicz	Hungary	5:02:35.4
4	Marcel Schouten	Netherlands	5:02:46.7
5	Kyle Lee	Australia	5:02:48.5
6	Lars Bottelier	Netherlands	5:02:51.6
7	Matteo Furlan	Italy	5:02:53.8
8	Ákos Kalmár	Hungary	5:03:52.1
9	Cho Cheng-chi	Chinese Taipei	5:04:18.7
10	Alberto Martínez	Spain	5:04:22.5
11	Andreas Waschburger	Germany	5:04:47.8
12	Simon Lamar	United States	5:06:15.3
13	Ben Langner	Germany	5:06:19.1
14	Taishin Minamide	Japan	5:09:26.1
15	Asterios Daldogiannis	Greece	5:09:26.3
16	Bailey Armstrong	Australia	5:09:40.3
17	Evgenij Pop Acev	North Macedonia	5:13:52.8
18	Zhang Jinhou	China	5:14:04.7
19	Sacha Velly	France	5:20:42.3
20	Vitaliy Khudyakov	Kazakhstan	5:23:10.4
–	Franco Cassini	Argentina	Did not finish
–	Elliot Sodemann	Sweden	Did not finish
–	Joey Tepper	United States	Did not finish
–	Bruce Almeida	Brazil	Did not finish
–	Maximiliano Paccot	Uruguay	Did not finish
–	Daniel Delgadillo	Mexico	Did not start
