= Open water swimming at the 2022 World Aquatics Championships – Women's 25 km =

Women's 25 km at the 2022 World Aquatics Championships
- Venue: Lake Lupa
- Location: Hungary
- Dates: 30 June
- Competitors: 15 from 11 nations
- Winning time: 5:24:15.0

Medalists
gold medal	Ana Marcela Cunha	Brazil
silver medal	Lea Boy	Germany
bronze medal	Sharon van Rouwendaal	Netherlands

The Women's 25 km competition at the 2022 World Aquatics Championships was held in June 2022.

== Results ==
The race was started at 07:00.

Rank	Swimmer	Nationality	Time
1st place, gold medalist(s)	Ana Marcela Cunha	Brazil	5:24:15.0
2nd place, silver medalist(s)	Lea Boy	Germany	5:24:15.2
3rd place, bronze medalist(s)	Sharon van Rouwendaal	Netherlands	5:24:15.3
4	Barbara Pozzobon	Italy	5:24:16.3
5	Caroline Jouisse	France	5:25:32.1
6	Elea Linka	Germany	5:25:36.7
7	Anna Auld	United States	5:26:25.6
8	Réka Rohács	Hungary	5:26:28.6
9	Hanano Kato	Japan	5:26:30.9
10	Kensey McMahon	United States	5:30:19.1
11	Cheng Hanyu	China	5:49:25.9
12	Wang Kexin	China	5:49:59.2
13	Cibelle Jungblut	Brazil	5:52:41.6
–	Ruby Heath	New Zealand	Did not finish
–	Romina Imwinkelried	Argentina	Did not finish
–	Lisa Pou	France	Did not start
