= Swimming at the 2022 World Aquatics Championships – Men's 1500 metre freestyle =

Men's 1500 metre freestyle at the 2022 World Aquatics Championships
- Venue: Danube Arena
- Location: Budapest, Hungary
- Dates: 24 June (heats); 25 June (final)
- Competitors: 23 from 21 nations
- Winning time: 14:32.80

Medalists
gold medal	Gregorio Paltrinieri	Italy
silver medal	Bobby Finke	United States
bronze medal	Florian Wellbrock	Germany

The Men's 1500 metre freestyle competition at the 2022 World Aquatics Championships was held on 24 and 25 June 2022.

== Records ==
Prior to the competition, the existing world and championship records were as follows.

World record	Sun Yang (CHN)	14:31.02	London, England	4 August 2012
Competition record	Sun Yang (CHN)	14:34.14	Shanghai, China	31 July 2011

The following record was established during the competition:

Date	Event	Name	Nationality	Time	Record
25 June	Final	Gregorio Paltrinieri	Italy	14:32.80	CR

== Results ==
=== Heats ===
The heats were started on 24 June at 10:11.

Rank	Heat	Lane	Name	Nationality	Time	Notes
1	2	4	Florian Wellbrock	Germany	14:50.12	Q
2	2	5	Mykhailo Romanchuk	Ukraine	14:50.68	Q
3	3	5	Bobby Finke	United States	14:50.71	Q
4	2	2	Guilherme Costa	Brazil	14:53.03	Q, SA
5	2	6	Damien Joly	France	14:53.47	Q
6	3	3	Lukas Märtens	Germany	14:53.59	Q
7	3	4	Gregorio Paltrinieri	Italy	14:54.56	Q
8	2	3	Daniel Jervis	Great Britain	14:56.89	Q
9	3	1	Daniel Wiffen	Ireland	14:57.66	NR
10	3	6	Charlie Clark	United States	15:00.33	
11	3	0	Krzysztof Chmielewski	Poland	15:07.70	
12	2	0	Kim Woo-min	South Korea	15:08.50	
13	3	8	Henrik Christiansen	Norway	15:09.53	
14	3	2	Samuel Short	Australia	15:10.14	
15	3	9	Marwan Elkamash	Egypt	15:10.80	
16	3	7	Nguyễn Huy Hoàng	Vietnam	15:15.06	
17	2	1	Ákos Kalmár	Hungary	15:21.44	
18	2	7	Carlos Garach	Spain	15:30.62	
19	1	6	Rafael Ponce	Peru	15:54.72	
20	1	4	Rodolfo Falcón	Cuba	16:02.43	
21	2	9	Tonnam Kanteemool	Thailand	16:09.28	
22	1	5	Abib Khalil	Lebanon	16:12.11	
23	1	3	Jahir López	Ecuador	16:57.92	
	2	8	Cheng Long	China	Did not start	

=== Final ===
The final was held on 25 June at 18:17.

Rank	Lane	Name	Nationality	Time	Notes
1st place, gold medalist(s)	1	Gregorio Paltrinieri	Italy	14:32.80	CR, ER
2nd place, silver medalist(s)	3	Bobby Finke	United States	14:36.70	AM
3rd place, bronze medalist(s)	4	Florian Wellbrock	Germany	14:36.94	
4	7	Lukas Märtens	Germany	14:40.89	
5	5	Mykhailo Romanchuk	Ukraine	14:40.98	
6	6	Guilherme Costa	Brazil	14:48.53	SA
7	8	Daniel Jervis	Great Britain	14:48.86	
8	2	Damien Joly	France	15:09.15	
