= Swimming at the 2022 World Aquatics Championships – Men's 800 metre freestyle =

Men's 800 metre freestyle at the 2022 World Aquatics Championships
- Venue: Danube Arena
- Location: Budapest, Hungary
- Dates: 20 June (heats); 21 June (final)
- Competitors: 30 from 27 nations
- Winning time: 7:39.36

Medalists
gold medal	Bobby Finke	United States
silver medal	Florian Wellbrock	Germany
bronze medal	Mykhailo Romanchuk	Ukraine

The Men's 800 metre freestyle competition at the 2022 World Aquatics Championships was held on 20 and 21 June 2022.

== Records ==
Prior to the competition, the existing world and championship records were as follows.

World record	Zhang Lin (CHN)	7:32.12	Rome, Italy	26 July 2009
Competition record	Zhang Lin (CHN)	7:32.12	Rome, Italy	26 July 2009

== Results ==
=== Heats ===
The heats were started on 20 June at 09:57.

Rank	Heat	Lane	Name	Nationality	Time	Notes
1	3	4	Mykhailo Romanchuk	Ukraine	7:44.75	Q
2	3	5	Florian Wellbrock	Germany	7:44.80	Q
3	3	6	Gabriele Detti	Italy	7:46.08	Q
4	4	4	Gregorio Paltrinieri	Italy	7:46.24	Q
5	3	1	Daniel Wiffen	Ireland	7:46.32	Q, NR
6	4	3	Bobby Finke	United States	7:46.36	Q
7	4	2	Guilherme Costa	Brazil	7:46.90	Q
8	4	8	Damien Joly	France	7:47.46	Q
9	4	7	Samuel Short	Australia	7:48.28	
10	4	1	Daniel Jervis	Great Britain	7:50.55	
11	3	2	Henrik Christiansen	Norway	7:50.98	
12	3	7	Charlie Clark	United States	7:51.59	
13	4	0	Marwan Elkamash	Egypt	7:52.08	
14	2	3	Kim Woo-min	South Korea	7:53.27	
15	4	5	Lukas Märtens	Germany	7:55.21	
16	4	9	Dimitrios Markos	Greece	8:00.08	
17	3	9	Bar Soloveychik	Israel	8:04.14	
18	3	8	Zhang Ziyang	China	8:04.18	
19	2	5	Carlos Garach	Spain	8:05.52	
20	2	6	Juan Morales	Colombia	8:05.61	
21	2	4	Ákos Kalmár	Hungary	8:06.67	
22	3	0	José Paulo Lopes	Portugal	8:14.40	
23	2	2	Kushagra Rawat	India	8:15.96	
24	1	5	Rafael Ponce	Peru	8:17.49	
25	2	1	Nguyễn Hữu Kim Sơn	Vietnam	8:24.02	
26	2	0	Rodolfo Falcón	Cuba	8:24.45	
27	1	4	Loris Bianchi	San Marino	8:27.93	
28	2	7	Cheuk Ming Ho	Hong Kong	8:32.67	
29	2	8	Ratthawit Thammananthachote	Thailand	8:35.86	
30	1	3	Muhammad Siddiqui	Pakistan	8:57.59	NR
	3	3	Elijah Winnington	Australia	Did not start	
	4	6	Felix Auböck	Austria	Did not start	

=== Final ===
The final was held on 21 June at 18:02.

Rank	Lane	Name	Nationality	Time	Notes
1st place, gold medalist(s)	7	Bobby Finke	United States	7:39.36	AM
2nd place, silver medalist(s)	5	Florian Wellbrock	Germany	7:39.63	NR
3rd place, bronze medalist(s)	4	Mykhailo Romanchuk	Ukraine	7:40.05	NR
4	6	Gregorio Paltrinieri	Italy	7:41.19	
5	1	Guilherme Costa	Brazil	7:45.48	SA
6	3	Gabriele Detti	Italy	7:47.75	
7	8	Damien Joly	France	7:48.10	
8	2	Daniel Wiffen	Ireland	7:50.63	
