= Kyle Lee =

Australian swimmer (born 2002)

Personal information
- Nationality: Australian
- Born: 23 February 2002 (age 24) Zimbabwe

Sport
- Country: Australia
- Sport: Open water swimming
- Events: 5 km, 10 km, 25 km, open water team relay
- Club: North Coast Swimming Club
- Coached by: Ian Mills
Medal record
World Championships
Gold medal – first place	2024 Doha	Team open water
Bronze medal – third place	2023 Fukuoka	Team open water
Bronze medal – third place	2025 Singapore	10 km open water

Kyle Lee (born 23 February 2002) is an Australian open water swimmer. At the 2022 World Aquatics Championships, he placed fifth in the 25 kilometre open water swim and eighth in the 5 kilometre open water swim. As part of the 2022 Marathon Swim World Series, he won two silver medals in the 4×1500 metre open water team relay. He is the 2022 Rottnest Channel Swim winner.

== Background ==
Lee emigrated with his parents and sister from Zimbabwe to Australind, Western Australia when he was six years old, at which time he started club swimming as a way to integrate into the new community. After completing his pre-university education, he moved to Perth to attend university and train with North Coast Swimming Club under the guidance of coach Ian Mills. He currently attends the University of Western Australia where he is pursuing a Bachelor's degree in commerce. As part of his weekly training routine volume, he completes approximately 60 to 70 kilometers in the water.

== Career ==
=== 2020–2022 ===
In February 2020, Lee competed in the 19.7 kilometre Rottnest Channel Swim at 17 years of age, placing third with a final time of 4 hours, 25 minutes and 30 seconds. In January 2022, he won the 3.6 kilometre Busselton Jetty Swim, placed second in the 5 kilometre open water swim and third in the 10 kilometre open water swim at the Australian Open Water Championships for the year. The following month, on 26 February, he achieved his first title-win in the Rottnest Channel Swim, finishing over 10 seconds ahead of the second-place finisher with a time of 4 hours, 5 minutes and 19 seconds.

==== 2022 World Aquatics Championships ====
Following his performances in January and February 2022, Lee was named to the 2022 World Aquatics Championships open water team for Australia in the 5 kilometre open water swim. The second day of open water swimming competition at the Championships, 27 June in Budapest, Hungary, he finished in eighth-place in the 5 kilometre open water swim with a time of 54:28.2, which was 6.2 seconds behind seventh-place finisher Dávid Betlehem of Hungary. Three days later, he placed fifth in the 25 kilometre open water swim with a time of 5:02:48.5, finishing 27.0 seconds after gold medalist Dario Verani of Italy.

==== 2022 Marathon Swim World Series ====
At the second stop of the 2022 FINA Marathon Swim World Series, held at Parc de la Villette in Paris, France, Lee started off with a twenty-eighth-place finish in the 10 kilometre open water swim with a time of 1:52:49.37 on 9 July. The following and final day, he won a silver medal as part of the 4×1500 metre open water relay, helping finish second behind the relay team from Italy in a time of 1:08:03.35. The medal marked his first achieved at a world-level senior competition. On 10 August, Lee was named to the open water roster for the 2022 Duel in the Pool, held against the United States in late August in Sydney. At the competition, with open water swimming conducted at Bondi Beach, he anchored the 4×800 metre open water relay to a first-place finish. Finishing the World Series in November at the final stop, held in Eilat, Israel, he won another silver medal in the 4×1500 metre open water relay, swimming the third leg of the relay in 16:13.80 to contribute to the final time of 1:06:36.60. The second of two days, he improved upon his twenty-eighth place in the 10 kilometre open water swim from Paris, this time finishing in a time of 1:46:59.80 to place fifteenth.

=== 2023 ===
At the 2023 Australian Open Water Championships in January, Lee won the 5 kilometre open water swim, finishing 0.06 seconds ahead of second-place finisher Nicholas Sloman with a time of 55:20.90. In mid-February, he defended his title at the 28th Busselton Jetty Swim, this time winning in 38:48.6, which set a new event record. On 24 March, he was named to the Swimming Australia roster for the 2023 World Aquatics Championships in the 5 kilometre open water swim. At the 2023 Australian Swimming Trials in June, he placed fifth in the 800 metre freestyle with a time of 8:00.32.

== International championships ==
Meet	5 kilometre	25 kilometre
WC 2022 (age: 20)	8th (54:28.2)	5th (5:02:48.5)

== Marathon Swim World Series circuits ==
The following medals Lee has won at Marathon Swim World Series circuits.

Edition	Individual			Relay			Total
Edition	Gold	Silver	Bronze	Gold	Silver	Bronze	Total
2022	0	0	0	0	2	0	2
Total	0	0	0	0	2	0	2

== Awards and honours ==
- Western Australia (WA) Open Water Swimmer of the Year, Shelley Taylor-Smith medal: 2021
