= Hungary at the 2022 World Aquatics Championships =

- Flag of Hungary
- FINA code: HUN
- National federation: Hungarian Swimming Federation
- Website: www.musz.hu (in Hungarian)

in Budapest, Hungary 18 June 2022 – 3 July 2022
- Competitors: 76 in 5 sports
- Medals Ranked 10th: Gold 2 Silver 2 Bronze 1 Total 5

World Aquatics Championships appearances (overview)
- 1973; 1975; 1978; 1982; 1986; 1991; 1994; 1998; 2001; 2003; 2005; 2007; 2009; 2011; 2013; 2015; 2017; 2019; 2022; 2023; 2024

Hungary competed at the 2022 World Aquatics Championships in Budapest, Hungary from 18 June to 3 July.

== Athletes by discipline ==
The following is the list of number of competitors participating at the Championships per discipline.

Sport	Men	Women	Total
Artistic swimming	0	11	11
Diving	0	2	2
Open water swimming	3*	3	6
Swimming	14	17	31
Water polo	13	13	26
Total	30	46	76

- 1 male athlete will compete in both open water swimming and in indoor swimming, and included within the swimming numbers.

== Medalists ==
Medal	Name	Sport	Event	Date
Gold	Kristóf Milák	Swimming	Men's 200 m butterfly	June 21
Gold	Kristóf Milák	Swimming	Men's 100 m butterfly	June 24
Silver	Réka Rohács; Dávid Betlehem; Anna Olasz; Kristóf Rasovszky	Open water swimming	Team	June 26
Silver	Hungary women's national water polo team: Kamilla Faragó; Edina Gangl; Krisztina Garda; Gréta Gurisatti; Rita Keszthelyi; Dóra Leimeter; Alda Magyari; Geraldine Mahieu; Zsuzsanna Máté; Rebecca Parkes; Natasa Rybanska; Dorottya Szilágyi; Vanda Vályi	Water polo	Women's tournament	July 2
Bronze	Péter Gálicz	Open water swimming	Men's 25 km	June 30

== Artistic swimming ==
Women

Athlete	Event	Preliminaries		Final	
Athlete	Event	Points	Rank	Points	Rank
Boglárka Gács; Linda Farkas	Duet technical routine	75.4002	19	Did not advance	
Anna Apáthy; Niké Barta; Linda Farkas; Boglárka Gács; Lilien Götz; Hanna Hatala; Szabina Hungler; Panna Szakáll	Team technical routine	75.6519	14	Did not advance	
Anna Apáthy; Niké Barta; Linda Farkas; Boglárka Gács; Lilien Götz; Hanna Hatala; Szabina Hungler; Adelin Regényi; Panna Szakáll; Blanka Taksonyi	Free routine combination	78.7333	=8	80.4667	8
Anna Apáthy; Niké Barta; Linda Farkas; Boglárka Gács; Lilien Götz; Hanna Hatala; Szabina Hungler; Adelin Regényi; Léna Szórát; Blanka Taksonyi	Highlight routine	78.5000	11	79.0667	11

== Diving ==
Women

Athlete	Event	Preliminaries		Semifinals		Final	
Athlete	Event	Points	Rank	Points	Rank	Points	Rank
Estilla Mosena	1 m springboard	194.15	37	—		Did not advance	
Estilla Mosena	3 m springboard	244.80	21	Did not advance			
Emma Veisz	1 m springboard	187.50	40	—		Did not advance	
Emma Veisz	3 m springboard	179.95	37	Did not advance			

== Open water swimming ==
Men

Athlete	Event	Time	Rank
Dávid Betlehem	5 km	54:22.0	7
Dávid Betlehem	10 km	1:53:07.9	9
Kristóf Rasovszky	5 km	54:28.3	9
Kristóf Rasovszky	10 km	DNF	
Péter Gálicz	25 km	5:02:35.4	3rd place, bronze medalist(s)
Ákos Kalmár	25 km	5:03:52.1	8

Women

Athlete	Event	Time	Rank
Anna Olasz	10 km	2:02:39.1	6
Réka Rohács	5 km	1:00:51.5	15
Réka Rohács	25 km	5:26:28.6	8
Vivien Balogh	5 km	1:00:59.2	24
Vivien Balogh	10 km	2:03:07.8	17

Mixed

Athlete	Event	Time	Rank
Réka Rohács; Dávid Betlehem; Anna Olasz; Kristóf Rasovszky	Team	1:04.43	2nd place, silver medalist(s)

== Swimming ==
Men

Athlete	Event	Heat		Semifinal		Final	
Athlete	Event	Time	Rank	Time	Rank	Time	Rank
Richárd Bohus	50 m backstroke	25.47	21	Did not advance			
Olivér Gál	50 m breaststroke	28.26	28	Did not advance			
Balázs Holló	400 m individual medley	4:10.87	5 Q	—		4:15.17	8
Ákos Kalmár	800 m freestyle	8:06.67	21	—		Did not advance	
Ákos Kalmár	1500 m freestyle	15:21.44	17	—		Did not advance	
Tamás Kenderesi	200 m butterfly	1:56.09	8 Q	1:54.79	6 Q	1:55.20	6
Hubert Kós	200 m individual medley	1:58.47	6 Q	1:57.23	5 Q	1:57.26	6
Hubert Kós	400 m individual medley	4:15.44	12	—		Did not advance	
Benedek Kovács	100 m backstroke	54.47	19	Did not advance			
Benedek Kovács	200 m backstroke	1:57.88	8 Q	1:57.12	8 Q	1:58.52	8
Kristóf Milák	100 m butterfly	50.68	1 Q	50.14	1 Q	50.14	1st place, gold medalist(s)
Kristóf Milák	200 m butterfly	1:54.10	1 Q	1:52.39	1 Q	1:50.34 WR	1st place, gold medalist(s)
Nándor Németh	100 m freestyle	48.33	9 Q	47.96; SO: 47.69	=8; 8 Q	48.13	6
Nándor Németh	200 m freestyle	1:47.71	19	Did not advance			
Szebasztián Szabó	50 m freestyle	21.99	12 Q	21.81	7 Q	21.60	4
Szebasztián Szabó	100 m freestyle	48.47	13 Q	48.19	12	Did not advance	
Szebasztián Szabó	50 m butterfly	23.11	8 Q	22.91	5 Q	23.01	6
Szebasztián Szabó	100 m butterfly	DNS		Did not advance			
Bence Szentes	50 m backstroke	25.62	24	Did not advance			
Tamás Takács	100 m breaststroke	1:01.86	28	Did not advance			
Ádám Telegdy	200 m backstroke	1:57.82	7 Q	1:56.80	5 Q	1:56.91	6
Dominik Márk Török	200 m individual medley	1:59.41	13 Q	2:00.71	15	Did not advance	
Szebasztián Szabó; Kristóf Milák; Richárd Bohus; Nándor Németh	4×100 m freestyle relay	3:12.38	3 Q	—		3:11.24	5
Richárd Márton; Nándor Németh; Balázs Holló; Kristóf Milák	4×200 m freestyle relay	7:07.46	3 Q	—		7:06.27	5

Women

Athlete	Event	Heat		Semifinal		Final	
Athlete	Event	Time	Rank	Time	Rank	Time	Rank
Eszter Békési	200 m breaststroke	2:27.95	16 Q	2:28.17	16	Did not advance	
Katalin Burián	100 m backstroke	1:01.26	19	Did not advance			
Katalin Burián	200 m backstroke	2:11.47	9 Q	2:10.07	8 Q	2:10.37	8
Viktória Mihályvári-Farkas	1500 m freestyle	16:26.41	12	—		Did not advance	
Viktória Mihályvári-Farkas	400 m individual medley	4:41.16	9	—		Did not advance	
Bettina Fábián	400 m freestyle	4:14.06	22	—		Did not advance	
Fanni Gyurinovics	100 m freestyle	54.97	19	Did not advance			
Petra Halmai	100 m breaststroke	1:11.09	36	Did not advance			
Katinka Hosszú	200 m butterfly	2:11.22	14 Q	2:10.64	13	Did not advance	
Katinka Hosszú	200 m individual medley	2:11.77	11 Q	2:10.72	8 Q	2:11.37	7
Katinka Hosszú	400 m individual medley	4:39.15	5 Q	—		4:37.89	4
Boglárka Kapás	200 m butterfly	2:09.24	7 Q	2:07.89	8 Q	2:08.12	7
Ajna Késely	400 m freestyle	4:09.09	12	—		Did not advance	
Ajna Késely	800 m freestyle	8:38.64	12	—		Did not advance	
Lora Komoróczy	50 m backstroke	28.49	17	Did not advance			
Dóra Molnár	200 m backstroke	2:10.88	7 Q	2:09.94	7 Q	2:10.08	7
Nikolett Pádár	200 m freestyle	1:58.90	18	Did not advance			
Dalma Sebestyén	100 m butterfly	DNS		Did not advance			
Dalma Sebestyén	200 m individual medley	2:13.13	15 Q	2:13.09	14	Did not advance	
Petra Senánszky	50 m freestyle	25.24	14 Q	24.95	11	Did not advance	
Anna Sztankovics	50 m breaststroke	31.31	19	Did not advance			
Dominika Varga	50 m butterfly	26.91	24	Did not advance			
Nikolett Pádár; Petra Senánszky; Dóra Molnár; Fanni Gyurinovics	4×100 m freestyle relay	3:39.04	8 Q	—		3:38.20	8
Nikolett Pádár; Boglárka Kapás; Zsuzsanna Jakabos; Ajna Késely; Dóra Molnár	4×200 m freestyle relay	7:56.52	5 Q	—		7:57.90	5.

== Water polo ==
Summary

Key:
- FT – After full time.
- P – Match decided by penalty-shootout.

Team	Event	Group stage				Playoff	Quarterfinal	Semifinals	Final	
Team	Event	Opposition Score	Opposition Score	Opposition Score	Rank	Opposition Score	Opposition Score	Opposition Score	Opposition Score	Rank
Hungary men's	Men's tournament	Montenegro; W 12–8	Brazil; W 20–6	Georgia; W 18–14	1	—	Italy; L 10–11	5–8th place semifinals United States; L 15–16 (P)	Seventh place game Montenegro; W 8–6	7
Hungary women's	Women's tournament	Colombia; W 25–4	Italy; L 9–10	Canada; W 11–7	2	Argentina; W 23–6	Australia; W 7–6	Netherlands; W 13–12	United States; L 7–9	2nd place, silver medalist(s)

=== Men's tournament ===
Team roster

The following is Hungarian roster in the Water polo at the 2022 World Aquatics Championships – Men's tournament.

Head coach: Tamás Märcz

- 1 Márton Lévai GK
- 2 Dániel Angyal CB
- 3 Krisztián Manhercz FP
- 4 Zoltán Pohl CB
- 5 Márton Vámos D
- 6 Tamás Mezei CF
- 7 Gergő Zalánki D
- 8 Gergely Burián D
- 9 Ádám Nagy CB
- 10 Dénes Varga FP
- 11 Szilárd Jansik D
- 12 Balázs Hárai CF
- 13 Soma Vogel GK

Group play

Pos	Team	Pld	W	D	L	GF	GA	GD	Pts	Qualification
1	Hungary (H)	3	3	0	0	50	28	+22	6	Quarterfinals
2	Montenegro	3	2	0	1	38	26	+12	4	Playoffs
3	Georgia	3	1	0	2	37	38	−1	2	Playoffs
4	Brazil	3	0	0	3	21	54	−33	0	

Source: Sportresult
Rules for classification: 1) points; 2) head-to-head points; 3) head-to-head goal difference; 4) head-to-head number of goals scored; 5) Goal difference.
(H) Hosts

21 June 2022; 21:00	Report	Montenegro	8–12	Hungary	Alfréd Hajós National Swimming Stadium, Budapest; Referees: Michael Goldenberg (USA), Frank Ohme (GER)
21 June 2022; 21:00	Report	Score by quarters: 3–3, 1–3, 2–3, 2–3			Alfréd Hajós National Swimming Stadium, Budapest; Referees: Michael Goldenberg (USA), Frank Ohme (GER)
21 June 2022; 21:00	Report	Petković 4	Goals	Zalánki 4	Alfréd Hajós National Swimming Stadium, Budapest; Referees: Michael Goldenberg (USA), Frank Ohme (GER)

23 June 2022; 21:00	Report	Hungary	20–6	Brazil	Alfréd Hajós National Swimming Stadium, Budapest; Referees: Andrew Carney (AUS), Frank Ohme (GER)
23 June 2022; 21:00	Report	Score by quarters: 7–1, 4–2, 3–1, 6–2			Alfréd Hajós National Swimming Stadium, Budapest; Referees: Andrew Carney (AUS), Frank Ohme (GER)
23 June 2022; 21:00	Report	three players 3	Goals	Real 2	Alfréd Hajós National Swimming Stadium, Budapest; Referees: Andrew Carney (AUS), Frank Ohme (GER)

25 June 2022; 21:00	Report	Hungary	18–14	Georgia	Alfréd Hajós National Swimming Stadium, Budapest; Referees: Dion Willis (RSA), Pascal Bouchez (FRA)
25 June 2022; 21:00	Report	Score by quarters: 3–3, 7–3, 4–5, 4–3			Alfréd Hajós National Swimming Stadium, Budapest; Referees: Dion Willis (RSA), Pascal Bouchez (FRA)
25 June 2022; 21:00	Report	Manhercz, Zalánki 4	Goals	Shushiashvili, Vapenski 3	Alfréd Hajós National Swimming Stadium, Budapest; Referees: Dion Willis (RSA), Pascal Bouchez (FRA)

Quarterfinal

29 June 2022; 21:00	Report	Hungary	10–11	Italy	Alfréd Hajós National Swimming Stadium, Budapest; Referees: Boris Margeta (SLO), David Gómez (ESP)
29 June 2022; 21:00	Report	Score by quarters: 3–2, 2–4, 1–2, 4–3			Alfréd Hajós National Swimming Stadium, Budapest; Referees: Boris Margeta (SLO), David Gómez (ESP)
29 June 2022; 21:00	Report	Vámos 3	Goals	Di Fulvio 4	Alfréd Hajós National Swimming Stadium, Budapest; Referees: Boris Margeta (SLO), David Gómez (ESP)

5–8th place semifinals

1 July 2022; 21:00	Report	Hungary	15–16	United States	Alfréd Hajós National Swimming Stadium, Budapest; Referees: Maro Savinović (CRO), Raffaele Colombo (ITA)
1 July 2022; 21:00	Report	Score by quarters: 4–3, 2–2, 2–3, 3–3 PSO: 4–5			Alfréd Hajós National Swimming Stadium, Budapest; Referees: Maro Savinović (CRO), Raffaele Colombo (ITA)
1 July 2022; 21:00	Report	Manhercz, Nagy 3	Goals	Daube 3	Alfréd Hajós National Swimming Stadium, Budapest; Referees: Maro Savinović (CRO), Raffaele Colombo (ITA)

Seventh place game

3 July 2022; 13:00	Report	Hungary	8–6	Montenegro	Alfréd Hajós National Swimming Stadium, Budapest; Referees: Levan Bertishvili (GEO), David Gómez (ESP)
3 July 2022; 13:00	Report	Score by quarters: 1–0, 4–2, 2–1, 1–3			Alfréd Hajós National Swimming Stadium, Budapest; Referees: Levan Bertishvili (GEO), David Gómez (ESP)
3 July 2022; 13:00	Report	Nagy, Zalánki 2	Goals	three players 2	Alfréd Hajós National Swimming Stadium, Budapest; Referees: Levan Bertishvili (GEO), David Gómez (ESP)

=== Women's tournament ===
Team roster

The following is Hungarian roster in the Water polo at the 2022 World Aquatics Championships – Women's tournament.

Head coach: Attila Bíró

- 1 Edina Gangl GK
- 2 Dorottya Szilágyi FP
- 3 Vanda Vályi FP
- 4 Gréta Gurisatti FP
- 5 Zsuzsanna Máté FP
- 6 Rebecca Parkes CB
- 7 Géraldine Mahieu CF
- 8 Rita Keszthelyi FP
- 9 Dóra Leimeter FP
- 10 Natasa Rybanska FP
- 11 Kamilla Faragó FP
- 12 Krisztina Garda FP
- 13 Alda Magyari GK

Group A

Pos	Team	Pld	W	D	L	GF	GA	GD	Pts	Qualification
1	Italy	3	2	1	0	48	21	+27	5	Quarterfinals
2	Hungary (H)	3	2	0	1	55	21	+34	4	Playoffs
3	Canada	3	1	1	1	36	20	+16	3	Playoffs
4	Colombia	3	0	0	3	11	88	−77	0	

Source: Sportresult
Rules for classification: 1) points; 2) head-to-head points; 3) head-to-head goal difference; 4) head-to-head number of goals scored; 5) Goal difference.
(H) Hosts

20 June 2022; 21:00	Report	Hungary	35–4	Colombia	Alfréd Hajós National Swimming Stadium, Budapest; Referees: Pascal Bouchez (FRA), Maro Savinović (CRO)
20 June 2022; 21:00	Report	Score by quarters: 8–2, 12–0, 7–0, 8–2			Alfréd Hajós National Swimming Stadium, Budapest; Referees: Pascal Bouchez (FRA), Maro Savinović (CRO)
20 June 2022; 21:00	Report	Rybanská 6	Goals	Vanegas 2	Alfréd Hajós National Swimming Stadium, Budapest; Referees: Pascal Bouchez (FRA), Maro Savinović (CRO)

22 June 2022; 21:00	Report	Italy	10–9	Hungary	Alfréd Hajós National Swimming Stadium, Budapest; Referees: Boris Margeta (SLO), Andrew Carney (AUS)
22 June 2022; 21:00	Report	Score by quarters: 3–4, 2–2, 3–1, 2–2			Alfréd Hajós National Swimming Stadium, Budapest; Referees: Boris Margeta (SLO), Andrew Carney (AUS)
22 June 2022; 21:00	Report	Avegno, Marletta 2	Goals	Parkes 3	Alfréd Hajós National Swimming Stadium, Budapest; Referees: Boris Margeta (SLO), Andrew Carney (AUS)

24 June 2022; 21:00	Report	Hungary	11–7	Canada	Alfréd Hajós National Swimming Stadium, Budapest; Referees: Michiel Zwart (NED), Frank Ohme (GER)
24 June 2022; 21:00	Report	Score by quarters: 2–1, 3–3, 4–0, 2–3			Alfréd Hajós National Swimming Stadium, Budapest; Referees: Michiel Zwart (NED), Frank Ohme (GER)
24 June 2022; 21:00	Report	Keszthelyi 3	Goals	McKelvey 3	Alfréd Hajós National Swimming Stadium, Budapest; Referees: Michiel Zwart (NED), Frank Ohme (GER)

Playoffs

26 June 2022; 18:30	Report	Hungary	23–6	Argentina	Alfréd Hajós National Swimming Stadium, Budapest; Referees: Dion Willis (RSA), Maro Savinović (CRO)
26 June 2022; 18:30	Report	Score by quarters: 4–0, 7–2, 6–3, 6–1			Alfréd Hajós National Swimming Stadium, Budapest; Referees: Dion Willis (RSA), Maro Savinović (CRO)
26 June 2022; 18:30	Report	Gurisatti 5	Goals	Leonard 3	Alfréd Hajós National Swimming Stadium, Budapest; Referees: Dion Willis (RSA), Maro Savinović (CRO)

Quarterfinals

28 June 2022; 21:00	Report	Australia	6–7	Hungary	Alfréd Hajós National Swimming Stadium, Budapest; Referees: Michael Goldenberg (USA), Raffaele Colombo (ITA)
28 June 2022; 21:00	Report	Score by quarters: 3–2, 0–1, 0–2, 3–2			Alfréd Hajós National Swimming Stadium, Budapest; Referees: Michael Goldenberg (USA), Raffaele Colombo (ITA)
28 June 2022; 21:00	Report	Halligan 3	Goals	Keszthelyi 3	Alfréd Hajós National Swimming Stadium, Budapest; Referees: Michael Goldenberg (USA), Raffaele Colombo (ITA)

Semifinals

30 June 2022; 21:00	Report	Hungary	13–12	Netherlands	Alfréd Hajós National Swimming Stadium, Budapest; Referees: Maro Savinović (CRO), Frank Ohme (GER)
30 June 2022; 21:00	Report	Score by quarters: 2–3, 4–3, 5–4, 2–2			Alfréd Hajós National Swimming Stadium, Budapest; Referees: Maro Savinović (CRO), Frank Ohme (GER)
30 June 2022; 21:00	Report	Leimeter 4	Goals	Van de Kraats 5	Alfréd Hajós National Swimming Stadium, Budapest; Referees: Maro Savinović (CRO), Frank Ohme (GER)

Final

2 July 2022; 20:00	Report	United States	9–7	Hungary	Alfréd Hajós National Swimming Stadium, Budapest; Referees: Boris Margeta (SLO), Frank Ohme (GER)
2 July 2022; 20:00	Report	Score by quarters: 2–1, 2–2, 3–1, 2–3			Alfréd Hajós National Swimming Stadium, Budapest; Referees: Boris Margeta (SLO), Frank Ohme (GER)
2 July 2022; 20:00	Report	Musselman 5	Goals	Gurisatti 3	Alfréd Hajós National Swimming Stadium, Budapest; Referees: Boris Margeta (SLO), Frank Ohme (GER)
