= Swimming at the 2022 World Aquatics Championships – Women's 200 metre backstroke =

Women's 200 metre backstroke at the 2022 World Aquatics Championships
- Venue: Danube Arena
- Location: Budapest, Hungary
- Dates: 23 June (heats and semifinals); 24 June (final)
- Competitors: 25 from 23 nations
- Winning time: 2:05.08

Medalists
gold medal	Kaylee McKeown	Australia
silver medal	Phoebe Bacon	United States
bronze medal	Rhyan White	United States

The Women's 200 metre backstroke competition at the 2022 World Aquatics Championships was held on 23 and 24 June 2022.

== Records ==
Prior to the competition, the existing world and championship records were as follows.

World record	Regan Smith (USA)	2:03.35	Gwangju, South Korea	26 July 2019
Competition record	Regan Smith (USA)	2:03.35	Gwangju, South Korea	26 July 2019

== Results ==
=== Heats ===
The heats were started on 23 June at 09:19.

Rank	Heat	Lane	Name	Nationality	Time	Notes
1	2	4	Phoebe Bacon	United States	2:07.89	Q
2	2	3	Peng Xuwei	China	2:08.53	Q
3	2	5	Margherita Panziera	Italy	2:08.64	Q
4	1	4	Rhyan White	United States	2:09.12	Q
5	3	4	Kaylee McKeown	Australia	2:09.26	Q
6	3	5	Kylie Masse	Canada	2:09.37	Q
7	3	6	Dóra Molnár	Hungary	2:10.88	Q
8	3	7	Emma Terebo	France	2:11.17	Q
9	1	5	Katalin Burian	Hungary	2:11.47	Q
10	2	6	Laura Bernat	Poland	2:11.48	Q
11	2	2	Aviv Barzelay	Israel	2:11.62	Q
12	1	7	Gabriela Georgieva	Bulgaria	2:12.69	Q
13	1	6	Lee Eun-ji	South Korea	2:13.30	Q
14	3	2	Tatiana Salcuțan	Moldova	2:13.45	Q
15	2	7	Aleksa Gold	Estonia	2:14.02	Q
16	2	1	Jimena Leguizamón	Colombia	2:16.38	Q
17	1	1	Alexia Sotomayor	Peru	2:16.65	
18	3	8	Xenia Ignatova	Kazakhstan	2:17.04	
19	1	8	Carolina Cermelli	Panama	2:20.93	
20	3	0	Danielle Titus	Barbados	2:21.34	
21	3	9	Samantha van Vuure	Curaçao	2:29.87	
22	2	0	Ridima Veerendrakumar	India	2:35.78	
23	2	9	Aishath Sausan	Maldives	2:53.55	NR
	2	8	Andrea Becali	Cuba	Disqualified	
	3	1	Kristen Romano	Puerto Rico	Disqualified	
	1	0	Yarinda Sunthornrangsri	Thailand	Did not start	
	1	2	Anastasia Gorbenko	Israel	Did not start	
	1	3	Liu Yaxin	China	Did not start	
	3	3	Taylor Ruck	Canada	Did not start	

=== Semifinals ===
The semifinals were started on 23 June at 18:21.

Rank	Heat	Lane	Name	Nationality	Time	Notes
1	2	4	Phoebe Bacon	United States	2:05.93	Q
2	2	3	Kaylee McKeown	Australia	2:06.41	Q
3	1	5	Rhyan White	United States	2:07.04	Q
4	2	5	Margherita Panziera	Italy	2:08.28	Q
5	1	4	Peng Xuwei	China	2:09.19	Q
6	1	3	Kylie Masse	Canada	2:09.23	Q
7	2	6	Dóra Molnár	Hungary	2:09.94	Q
8	2	2	Katalin Burian	Hungary	2:10.07	Q
9	2	7	Aviv Barzelay	Israel	2:10.42	NR
10	2	1	Lee Eun-ji	South Korea	2:10.48	
11	1	2	Laura Bernat	Poland	2:10.87	
12	1	6	Emma Terebo	France	2:11.77	
13	1	7	Gabriela Georgieva	Bulgaria	2:13.15	
14	1	1	Tatiana Salcuțan	Moldova	2:14.10	
15	2	8	Aleksa Gold	Estonia	2:14.14	
16	1	8	Jimena Leguizamón	Colombia	2:15.11	

=== Final ===
The final was held on 24 June at 18:53.

Rank	Lane	Name	Nationality	Time	Notes
1st place, gold medalist(s)	5	Kaylee McKeown	Australia	2:05.08	
2nd place, silver medalist(s)	4	Phoebe Bacon	United States	2:05.12	
3rd place, bronze medalist(s)	3	Rhyan White	United States	2:06.96	
4	6	Margherita Panziera	Italy	2:07.27	
5	7	Kylie Masse	Canada	2:08.00	
6	2	Peng Xuwei	China	2:09.13	
7	1	Dóra Molnár	Hungary	2:10.08	
8	8	Katalin Burian	Hungary	2:10.37	
