= Swimming at the 2022 World Aquatics Championships – Men's 50 metre freestyle =

Men's 50 metre freestyle at the 2022 World Aquatics Championships
- Venue: Danube Arena
- Location: Budapest, Hungary
- Dates: 23 June (heats and semifinals); 24 June (final)
- Competitors: 91 from 81 nations
- Winning time: 21.32

Medalists
gold medal	Ben Proud	Great Britain
silver medal	Michael Andrew	United States
bronze medal	Maxime Grousset	France

The Men's 50 metre freestyle competition at the 2022 World Aquatics Championships was held on 23 and 24 June 2022.

== Records ==
Prior to the competition, the existing world and championship records were as follows.

World record	César Cielo (BRA)	20.91	São Paulo, Brazil	18 December 2009
Competition record	Caeleb Dressel (USA)	21.04	Gwangju, South Korea	27 July 2019

== Results ==
=== Heats ===
The heats were held on 23 June at 09:30.

Rank	Heat	Lane	Name	Nationality	Time	Notes
1	10	5	Bruno Fratus	Brazil	21.71	Q
2	9	3	Joshua Liendo	Canada	21.72	Q
3	8	4	Michael Andrew	United States	21.74	Q
4	9	4	Ben Proud	Great Britain	21.76	Q
5	10	6	Vladyslav Bukhov	Ukraine	21.87	Q
6	10	2	Lewis Burras	Great Britain	21.89	Q
7	10	3	Kristian Gkolomeev	Greece	21.90	Q
8	8	5	Thom de Boer	Netherlands	21.91	Q
9	8	6	Lorenzo Zazzeri	Italy	21.95	Q
10	8	3	Paweł Juraszek	Poland	21.97	Q
10	9	6	Maxime Grousset	France	21.97	Q
12	9	1	Szebasztián Szabó	Hungary	21.99	Q
13	9	5	Florent Manaudou	France	22.04	Q
14	8	7	Meiron Cheruti	Israel	22.07	Q
15	9	2	Jesse Puts	Netherlands	22.09	Q
16	9	7	Alberto Mestre	Venezuela	22.12	Q
17	6	2	Dylan Carter	Trinidad and Tobago	22.19	
17	6	6	Ji Yu-chan	South Korea	22.19	
19	5	5	Jordan Crooks	Cayman Islands	22.20	NR
20	8	0	Nicholas Lia	Norway	22.26	
20	10	8	Luiz Gustavo Borges	Brazil	22.26	
22	7	4	Andrej Barna	Serbia	22.30	
23	10	1	Ian Ho	Hong Kong	22.32	
24	6	3	Mikel Schreuders	Aruba	22.44	
25	6	4	Daniel Zaitsev	Estonia	22.45	
25	8	2	Thomas Nowakowski	Australia	22.45	
27	7	1	Isak Eliasson	Sweden	22.47	
28	8	1	Konrad Czerniak	Poland	22.48	
28	8	8	Heiko Gigler	Austria	22.48	
30	9	9	Jonathan Tan	Singapore	22.51	
31	7	3	Calum Bain	Ireland	22.53	
32	6	5	Guido Buscaglia	Argentina	22.55	
33	6	1	Oussama Sahnoune	Algeria	22.56	
34	7	8	Michael Pickett	New Zealand	22.59	
34	7	9	Matej Duša	Slovakia	22.59	
36	10	7	Luca Dotto	Italy	22.60	
37	9	8	Gabriel Castaño	Mexico	22.64	
38	7	7	Kaloyan Bratanov	Bulgaria	22.68	
38	10	0	Wang Changhao	China	22.68	
40	9	0	Grayson Bell	Australia	22.69	
41	7	5	Yuri Kisil	Canada	22.71	
41	7	6	Andriy Govorov	Ukraine	22.71	
43	6	8	Clayton Jimmie	South Africa	22.74	
44	7	2	Zhang Zhoujian	China	22.75	
45	5	4	Nikolas Antoniou	Cyprus	22.77	
46	10	9	Alexander Varakin	Kazakhstan	22.79	
47	6	7	Rémi Fabiani	Luxembourg	22.80	
48	6	0	Lamar Taylor	Bahamas	22.86	
49	5	2	Tomas Navikonis	Lithuania	22.92	
50	8	9	Abdelrahman Sameh	Egypt	22.95	
51	7	0	Wu Chun-feng	Chinese Taipei	23.17	
52	5	9	Khurshidjon Tursunov	Uzbekistan	23.20	
53	5	8	Bernat Lomero	Andorra	23.29	
54	5	0	Nikola Bjelajac	Bosnia and Herzegovina	23.42	
55	5	3	Artur Barseghyan	Armenia	23.46	
55	6	9	Souhail Hamouchane	Morocco	23.46	
57	5	7	Stefano Mitchell	Antigua and Barbuda	23.52	
58	5	6	Matin Sohran	Iran	23.74	
59	1	2	Irvin Hoost	Suriname	23.96	
60	4	1	Belly-Cresus Ganira	Burundi	24.03	
61	4	2	Musa Zhalayev	Turkmenistan	24.15	
62	4	7	Swaleh Talib	Suspended Member Federation	24.23	
63	4	4	Gregory Anodin	Mauritius	24.38	
64	2	2	Batbayaryn Enkhtamir	Mongolia	24.42	
65	1	6	Christian Nikles	Brunei	24.44	
66	4	8	Shane Cadogan	Saint Vincent and the Grenadines	24.57	
67	4	5	Tendo Mukalazi	Uganda	24.58	
68	4	6	Alassane Seydou	Niger	24.63	
69	4	3	Raphael Grand'Pierre	Haiti	24.94	
70	4	0	Leon Seaton	Guyana	25.07	
71	4	9	Marc Dansou	Benin	25.13	
72	3	4	Eloi Maniraguha	Rwanda	25.26	
73	2	7	Dennis Mhini	Tanzania	25.44	
74	3	5	Martin Muja	Kosovo	25.45	
75	3	6	Rohan Shearer	Turks and Caicos Islands	25.50	
76	1	8	Taiyo Akimaru	Northern Mariana Islands	26.02	
77	1	3	Fakhriddin Madkamov	Tajikistan	26.11	
78	2	6	Slava Sihanouvong	Laos	26.25	
79	3	3	Troy Pina	Cape Verde	26.45	
80	1	5	Travis Sakurai	Palau	26.57	
81	2	4	Houmed Houssein Barkat	Djibouti	27.05	
82	3	2	Edgar Iro	Solomon Islands	27.39	
83	1	1	Aseel Khousrof	Yemen	27.51	
84	3	0	Phillip Kinono	Marshall Islands	27.54	
85	2	0	Kyler Kihleng	Micronesia	27.56	
86	3	1	Elhadj Diallo	Guinea	27.72	
87	3	8	Adam Mpali	Gabon	27.93	
88	3	9	Asher Banda	Malawi	28.30	
89	1	4	Higinio Ndong Obama	Equatorial Guinea	29.48	
90	2	9	Ali Barouf	Comoros	32.52	
	2	8	Tilahun Mayede	Ethiopia	Disqualified	
	1	7	Loic Leenaerts	Togo	Did not start	
	2	1	Freddy Mayala	Republic of the Congo	Did not start	
	2	3	Terence Tengue	Central African Republic	Did not start	
	2	5	Yves Munyu	DR Congo	Did not start	
	3	7	Souleymane Napare	Burkina Faso	Did not start	
	5	1	Alaa Maso	FINA Refugee Team	Did not start	
	10	4	Caeleb Dressel	United States	Did not start	

=== Semifinals ===
The semifinals started on 23 June at 18:42.

Rank	Heat	Lane	Name	Nationality	Time	Notes
1	1	5	Ben Proud	Great Britain	21.42	Q
2	2	2	Lorenzo Zazzeri	Italy	21.70	Q
3	1	4	Joshua Liendo	Canada	21.73	Q
4	1	3	Lewis Burras	Great Britain	21.78	Q
5	2	5	Michael Andrew	United States	21.80	Q
5	2	6	Kristian Gkolomeev	Greece	21.80	Q
7	1	7	Szebasztián Szabó	Hungary	21.81	Q
8	2	4	Bruno Fratus	Brazil	21.83	QSO
8	2	7	Maxime Grousset	France	21.83	QSO
10	2	3	Vladyslav Bukhov	Ukraine	21.87	
11	2	1	Florent Manaudou	France	21.95	
12	1	6	Thom de Boer	Netherlands	21.99	
13	1	1	Meiron Cheruti	Israel	22.00	
14	1	2	Paweł Juraszek	Poland	22.01	
15	2	8	Jesse Puts	Netherlands	22.02	
16	1	8	Alberto Mestre	Venezuela	22.13	

==== Swim-off ====
The swim-off started on 23 June at 20:13.

Rank	Lane	Name	Nationality	Time	Notes
1	5	Maxime Grousset	France	21.59	Q
2	4	Bruno Fratus	Brazil	21.62	

=== Final ===
The final was held on 24 June at 18:09.

Rank	Lane	Name	Nationality	Time	Notes
1st place, gold medalist(s)	4	Ben Proud	Great Britain	21.32	
2nd place, silver medalist(s)	2	Michael Andrew	United States	21.41	
3rd place, bronze medalist(s)	8	Maxime Grousset	France	21.57	
4	1	Szebasztián Szabó	Hungary	21.60	
5	3	Joshua Liendo	Canada	21.61	NR
6	5	Lorenzo Zazzeri	Italy	21.81	
7	6	Lewis Burras	Great Britain	21.83	
8	7	Kristian Gkolomeev	Greece	21.89	
