= Italy at the 2022 World Aquatics Championships =

- Flag of Italy
- World Aquatics code: ITA
- National federation: Italian Swimming Federation
- Website: federnuoto.it (in Italian)

in Budapest, Hungary
- Medals Ranked 3rd: Gold 9 Silver 7 Bronze 6 Total 22

World Aquatics Championships appearances (overview)
- 1973; 1975; 1978; 1982; 1986; 1991; 1994; 1998; 2001; 2003; 2005; 2007; 2009; 2011; 2013; 2015; 2017; 2019; 2022; 2023; 2024; 2025

Italy competed at the 2022 World Aquatics Championships in Budapest, Hungary from 18 June to 3 July. Having clinched the final in men's water polo, for the first time it has won at least one medal in every discipline.

== Medalists ==
Medal	Name	Sport	Event	Date
Bronze	Manuel Frigo; Alessandro Miressi; Lorenzo Zazzeri; Thomas Ceccon	Swimming	Men's 4×100 metre freestyle relay	June 18
Gold	Nicolò Martinenghi	Swimming	Men's 100 metre breaststroke	June 19
Gold	Lucrezia Ruggiero; Giorgio Minisini	Artistic swimming	Mixed duet technical routine	June 20
Bronze	Domiziana Cavanna; Linda Cerruti; Costanza Di Camillo; Costanza Ferro; Gemma Galli; Marta Iacoacci; Marta Murru; Enrica Piccoli; Federica Sala; Francesca Zunino	Artistic swimming	Free routine combination	June 20
Gold	Thomas Ceccon	Swimming	Men's 100 metre backstroke	June 20
Gold	Benedetta Pilato	Swimming	Women's 100 metre breaststroke	June 20
Bronze	Domiziana Cavanna; Linda Cerruti; Costanza Di Camillo; Costanza Ferro; Gemma Galli; Marta Iacoacci; Marta Murru; Enrica Piccoli	Artistic swimming	Team technical routine	June 21
Silver	Nicolò Martinenghi	Swimming	Men's 50 metre breaststroke	June 21
Bronze	Simona Quadarella	Swimming	Women's 800 metre freestyle	June 24
Gold	Lucrezia Ruggiero; Giorgio Minisini	Artistic swimming	Mixed Duet free routine	June 25
Silver	Domiziana Cavanna; Linda Cerruti; Costanza Di Camillo; Costanza Ferro; Gemma Galli; Marta Iacoacci; Marta Murru; Enrica Piccoli; Federica Sala; Francesca Zunino	Artistic swimming	Highlight routine	June 25
Silver	Benedetta Pilato	Swimming	Women's 50 metre breaststroke	June 25
Gold	Gregorio Paltrinieri	Swimming	Men's 1500 metre freestyle	June 25
Gold	Nicolò Martinenghi; Thomas Ceccon; Federico Burdisso; Alessandro Miressi	Swimming	Men's 4×100 metre medley relay	June 25
Bronze	Domenico Acerenza; Giulia Gabbrielleschi; Gregorio Paltrinieri; Ginevra Tadeucci	Open water swimming	Team	June 26
Silver	Gregorio Paltrinieri	Open water swimming	Men's 5 km	June 27
Bronze	Giulia Gabbrielleschi	Open water swimming	Women's 5 km	June 27
Gold	Gregorio Paltrinieri	Open water swimming	Men's 10 km	June 29
Silver	Domenico Acerenza	Open water swimming	Men's 10 km	June 29
Silver	Matteo Santoro; Chiara Pellacani	Diving	Mixed 3 m synchronized springboard	June 29
Gold	Dario Verani	Open water swimming	Men's 25 km	June 30
Silver	Italy men's national water polo team: Lorenzo Bruni; Giacomo Cannella; Luca Damonte; Marco Del Lungo; Francesco Di Fulvio; Edoardo Di Somma; Vincenzo Dolce; Gonzalo Echenique; Andrea Fondelli; Matteo Iocchi Gratta; Luca Marziali; Gianmarco Nicosia; Nicholas Presciutti	Water polo	Men's tournament	July 3

== Artistic swimming ==
Italy entered 14 artistic swimmers.

Women

Athlete	Event	Preliminaries		Final	
Athlete	Event	Points	Rank	Points	Rank
Linda Cerruti	Solo technical routine	88.6075	4 Q	89.0142	4
Linda Cerruti	Solo free routine	90.2667	4 Q	90.9667	4
Linda Cerruti; Costanza Ferro	Duet technical routine	89.4116	5 Q	89.8733	5
Linda Cerruti; Costanza Ferro	Duet free routine	90.5333	4 Q	91.3333	4
Domiziana Cavanna; Linda Cerruti; Costanza Di Camillo; Costanza Ferro; Gemma Galli; Marta Iacoacci; Marta Murru; Enrica Piccoli	Team technical routine	89.5775	3 Q	91.0191	3rd place, bronze medalist(s)
Domiziana Cavanna; Linda Cerruti; Costanza Di Camillo; Costanza Ferro; Gemma Galli; Marta Iacoacci; Enrica Piccoli; Francesca Zunino	Team free routine	91.2667	5 Q	91.9000	5
Domiziana Cavanna; Linda Cerruti; Costanza Di Camillo; Costanza Ferro; Gemma Galli; Marta Iacoacci; Marta Murru; Enrica Piccoli; Federica Sala; Francesca Zunino	Free routine combination	90.9667	3 Q	92.0333	3rd place, bronze medalist(s)
Domiziana Cavanna; Linda Cerruti; Costanza Di Camillo; Costanza Ferro; Gemma Galli; Marta Iacoacci; Marta Murru; Enrica Piccoli; Federica Sala; Francesca Zunino	Highlight routine	91.6667	2 Q	92.2667	2nd place, silver medalist(s)

Mixed

Athlete	Event	Preliminaries		Final	
Athlete	Event	Points	Rank	Points	Rank
Giorgio Minisini; Lucrezia Ruggiero	Duet technical routine	88.5734	1 Q	89.2685	1st place, gold medalist(s)
Giorgio Minisini; Lucrezia Ruggiero	Duet free routine	90.5000	1 Q	90.9667	1st place, gold medalist(s)

== Diving ==
Men

Athlete	Event	Preliminaries		Semifinals		Final	
Athlete	Event	Points	Rank	Points	Rank	Points	Rank
Giovanni Tocci	1 m springboard	396.15	1 Q	—N/a		326.75	10
Giovanni Tocci	3 m springboard	327.00	36	Did not advance			
Lorenzo Marsaglia	1 m springboard	350.60	15	—N/a		Did not advance	
Lorenzo Marsaglia	3 m springboard	369.10	16 Q	355.50	14	Did not advance	
Andreas Larsen	10 m platform	369.70	16 Q	296.05	18	Did not advance	
Eduard Timbretti	10 m platform	279.85	37	Did not advance			
Lorenzo Marsaglia; Giovanni Tocci	3 m synchronized springboard	361.65	6 Q	—N/a		372.33	6
Andreas Larsen; Eduard Timbretti	10 m synchronized platform	357.00	6 Q	—N/a		328.95	10

Women

Athlete	Event	Preliminaries		Semifinals		Final	
Athlete	Event	Points	Rank	Points	Rank	Points	Rank
Chiara Pellacani	1 m springboard	251.05	7 Q	—N/a		269.25	4
Chiara Pellacani	3 m springboard	268.80	15 Q	303.75	3 Q	291.60	9
Elena Bertocchi	1 m springboard	243.20	14	—N/a		Did not advance	
Elena Bertocchi	3 m springboard	Did not start					
Sarah Jodoin Di Maria	10 m platform	275.25	15 Q	302.05	9 Q	295.65	7
Maia Biginelli	10 m platform	235.90	23	Did not advance			
Chiara Pellacani; Elena Bertocchi	3 m synchronized springboard	Did not start					

Mixed

Athlete	Event	Final	
Athlete	Event	Points	Rank
Matteo Santoro; Chiara Pellacani	3 m synchronized springboard	293.55	2nd place, silver medalist(s)
Eduard Timbretti; Sarah Jodoin Di Maria	10 m synchronized platform	269.34	5

== Open water swimming ==
Men

Athlete	Event	Time	Rank
Gregorio Paltrinieri	Men's 5 km	52:52.7	2nd place, silver medalist(s)
Gregorio Paltrinieri	Men's 10 km	1:50:56.8	1st place, gold medalist(s)
Domenico Acerenza	Men's 5 km	53:22.6	4
Domenico Acerenza	Men's 10 km	1:50:58.2	2nd place, silver medalist(s)
Dario Verani	Men's 25 km	5:02:21.5	1st place, gold medalist(s)
Matteo Furlan	Men's 25 km	5:02:53.8	7

Women

Athlete	Event	Time	Rank
Ginevra Taddeucci	Women's 5 km	58:00.4	6
Giulia Gabbrielleschi	Women's 5 km	57:54.9	3rd place, bronze medalist(s)
Giulia Gabbrielleschi	Women's 10 km	2:02:52.2	14
Rachele Bruni	Women's 10 km	2:03:17.3	18
Barbara Pozzobon	Women's 25 km	5:24:16.3	4

Mixed

Athlete	Event	Time	Rank
Ginevra Taddeucci; Giulia Gabbrielleschi; Domenico Acerenza; Gregorio Paltrinieri	Team	1:04:43.0	3rd place, bronze medalist(s)

== Swimming ==
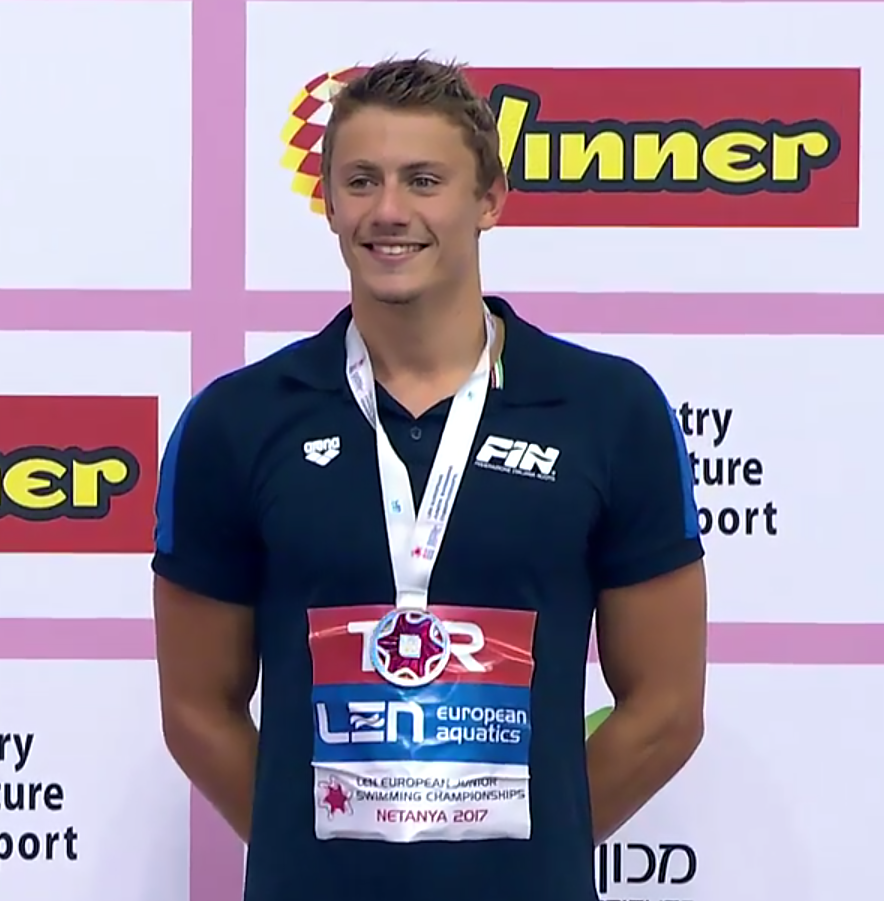
Nicolò Martinenghi two gold and one silver medals won at this edition of the championships.

Italy ranked third in the medal table of swimming behind the USA and China, with 9 gold, 6 silver and 6 bronze medals won.

Italy entered 29 swimmers.

Men

Athlete	Event	Heat		Semifinal		Final	
Athlete	Event	Time	Rank	Time	Rank	Time	Rank
Federico Burdisso	100 m butterfly	51.92	13 Q	51.45	10	Did not advance	
Giacomo Carini	200 m butterfly	1:56.38	11 Q	1:55.74	12	Did not advance	
Thomas Ceccon	50 m backstroke	24.62 NR	3 Q	24.46 NR	4 Q	24.51	4
Thomas Ceccon	100 m backstroke	53.70	9 Q	52.12 NR	2 Q	51.60 WR	1st place, gold medalist(s)
Thomas Ceccon	50 m butterfly	22.88 'NR	2 Q	22.79 NR	2 Q	22.86	5
Simone Cerasuolo	50 m breaststroke	27.17	8 Q	27.01	5 Q	26.98	5
Piero Codia	50 m butterfly	23.53; 23.40	16 QSD; 2	Did not advance			
Piero Codia	100 m butterfly	51.69	9 Q	51.73	14	Did not advance	
Marco De Tullio	200 m freestyle	1:47.27	13 Q	1:46.29	10	Did not advance	
Marco De Tullio	400 m freestyle	3:46.47	8 Q	—N/a		3:44.14	5
Gabriele Detti	800 m freestyle	7:46.08	3 Q	—N/a		7:47.75	6
Stefano Di Cola	200 m freestyle	1:48.09	24	Did not advance			
Luca Dotto	50 m freestyle	22.60	36	Did not advance			
Lorenzo Galossi	400 m freestyle	3:47.19	12	—N/a		Did not advance	
Michele Lamberti	50 m backstroke	25.16	16 Q	24.86	11	Did not advance	
Michele Lamberti	200 m backstroke	2:00.92	21	Did not advance			
Nicolò Martinenghi	50 m breaststroke	26.68	1 Q	26.56	1 Q	26.48	2nd place, silver medalist(s)
Nicolò Martinenghi	100 m breaststroke	59.06	4 Q	58.46	1 Q	58.26 NR	1st place, gold medalist(s)
Alessandro Miressi	100 m freestyle	48.51	16 Q	47.89	6 Q	48.31	8
Gregorio Paltrinieri	800 m freestyle	7:46.24	4 Q	—N/a		7:41.19	4
Gregorio Paltrinieri	1500 m freestyle	14:54.56	7 Q	—N/a		14:32.80 CR, ER	1st place, gold medalist(s)
Alberto Razzetti	200 m butterfly	1:55.71	5 Q	1:54.87	7 Q	1:55.52	7
Alberto Razzetti	200 m individual medley	1:58.70	8 Q	1:58.02	10	Did not advance	
Alberto Razzetti	400 m individual medley	4:13.72	9	—N/a		Did not advance	
Lorenzo Zazzeri	50 m freestyle	21.95	9 Q	21.70	2 Q	21.81	6
Lorenzo Zazzeri	100 m freestyle	48.29	8 Q	47.96; 48.04	8 QSO; 2	Did not advance	
Alessandro Miressi; Thomas Ceccon; Lorenzo Zazzeri; Manuel Frigo	4 × 100 m freestyle relay	3:13.13	6 Q	—N/a		3:10.95	3rd place, bronze medalist(s)
Stefano Ballo; Matteo Ciampi; Gabriele Detti; Stefano Di Cola	4 × 200 m freestyle relay	7:10.16	9	—N/a		Did not advance	
Thomas Ceccon; Nicolò Martinenghi; Federico Burdisso; Alessandro Miressi; Piero Codia*; Lorenzo Zazzeri*	4 × 100 m medley relay	3:33.02	3 Q	—N/a		3:27.51 =ER	1st place, gold medalist(s)

Women

Athlete	Event	Heat		Semifinal		Final	
Athlete	Event	Time	Rank	Time	Rank	Time	Rank
Arianna Castiglioni	50 m breaststroke	Disqualified		Did not advance			
Arianna Castiglioni	100 m breaststroke	1:06.49	4 Q	1:06.59	11	Did not advance	
Elena Di Liddo	50 m butterfly	26.47	15 Q	26.59	16	Did not advance	
Elena Di Liddo	100 m butterfly	57.97	9 Q	58.44	13	Did not advance	
Silvia Di Pietro	50 m freestyle	25.33	15 Q	Disqualified		Did not advance	
Silvia Di Pietro	50 m butterfly	26.08	9 Q	26.08	12	Did not advance	
Francesca Fangio	200 m breaststroke	2:25.70	7 Q	2:25.09	8 Q	2:25.08	7
Margherita Panziera	100 m backstroke	1:00.40	9 Q	1:00.26	10	Did not advance	
Margherita Panziera	200 m backstroke	2:08.64	3 Q	2:08.28	4 Q	2:07.27	4
Benedetta Pilato	50 m breaststroke	29.80	2 Q	29.83	1 Q	29.80	2nd place, silver medalist(s)
Benedetta Pilato	100 m breaststroke	1:06.68	8 Q	1:05.88	2 Q	1:05.93	1st place, gold medalist(s)
Simona Quadarella	800 m freestyle	8:27.96	7 Q	—N/a		8:19.00	3rd place, bronze medalist(s)
Simona Quadarella	1500 m freestyle	15:56.19	2 Q	—N/a		16:03.84	5
Silvia Scalia	50 m backstroke	27.86	7 Q	27.72; 27.65 NR	8 QSO; 2	Did not advance	
Silvia Scalia	100 m backstroke	1:00.77	11 Q	1:00.58	11	Did not advance	
Chiara Tarantino	100 m freestyle	55.30	21	Did not advance			
Margherita Panziera; Benedetta Pilato; Elena Di Liddo; Silvia Di Pietro; Silvia Scalia*; Arianna Castiglioni*	4 × 100 m medley relay	3:59.40	5 Q	—N/a		3:58.86	7

Mixed

Athlete	Event	Heat		Final	
Athlete	Event	Time	Rank	Time	Rank
Lorenzo Zazzeri; Alessandro Miressi; Silvia Di Pietro; Chiara Tarantino	4 × 100 m freestyle relay	3:26.00	5 Q	3:25.83	7
Thomas Ceccon; Nicolò Martinenghi; Elena Di Liddo; Silvia Di Pietro; Michele Lamberti*; Arianna Castiglioni*; Manuel Frigo*	4 × 100 m medley relay	3:46.44	7 Q	3:41.67	5

Legend: (*) = Swimmers who participated in the heat only.

== Water polo ==
Summary

Key:
- FT – After full time.
- P – Match decided by penalty-shootout.

Team	Event	Group stage				Playoff	Quarterfinal	Semifinals	Final	
Team	Event	Opposition Score	Opposition Score	Opposition Score	Rank	Opposition Score	Opposition Score	Opposition Score	Opposition Score	Rank
Italy	Men's tournament	South Africa; W 22–4	Spain; L 12–14	Canada cancelled	2	Australia; W 17–6	Hungary; W 11–10	Greece; W 11–10	Spain; L 14–15 (P)	2nd place, silver medalist(s)
Italy	Women's tournament	Canada; D 7–7	Hungary; W 10–9	Colombia; W 31–5	1	—N/a	France; W 17–7	United States; L 6–14	Netherlands; L 4–7	4

=== Men's tournament ===
Team roster

The following is Italian roster in the Water polo at the 2022 World Aquatics Championships – Men's tournament.

Head coach: Alessandro Campagna

- 1 Marco Del Lungo GK
- 2 Francesco Di Fulvio D
- 3 Luca Damonte D
- 4 Matteo Iocchi Gratta CB
- 5 Andrea Fondelli D
- 6 Giacomo Cannella D
- 7 Luca Marziali CF
- 8 Gonzalo Echenique D
- 9 Nicholas Presciutti CB
- 10 Lorenzo Bruni CF
- 11 Edoardo Di Somma CB
- 12 Vincenzo Dolce CB
- 13 Gianmarco Nicosia GK

Group play

Pos	Team	Pld	W	D	L	GF	GA	GD	Pts	Qualification
1	Spain	2	2	0	0	42	14	+28	4	Quarterfinals
2	Italy	2	1	0	1	34	18	+16	2	Playoffs
3	South Africa	2	0	0	2	6	50	−44	0	Playoffs
4	Canada (Note: On 24 June, the Canadian team withdrew from the tournament after multiple positive COVID-19 cases amongst the team.)	0	0	0	0	0	0	0	0	Withdrew

Source: Sportresult
Rules for classification: 1) points; 2) head-to-head points; 3) head-to-head goal difference; 4) head-to-head number of goals scored; 5) Goal difference.
Notes:

21 June 2022; 18:00	Report	South Africa	4–22	Italy	Sopron Lőver Pool, Sopron; Referees: Radu Matache (ROU), Wallop Jirathornwattana (THA)
21 June 2022; 18:00	Report	Score by quarters: 1–3, 1–1, 0–7, 2–11			Sopron Lőver Pool, Sopron; Referees: Radu Matache (ROU), Wallop Jirathornwattana (THA)
21 June 2022; 18:00	Report	four players 1	Goals	Fondelli 4	Sopron Lőver Pool, Sopron; Referees: Radu Matache (ROU), Wallop Jirathornwattana (THA)

Cancelled (Note: The match, originally scheduled for 23 June 2022, was postponed due to health concerns.)	Italy	–	Canada

25 June 2022; 18:00	Report	Italy	12–14	Spain	Sopron Lőver Pool, Sopron; Referees: Boris Margeta (SLO), Michiel Zwart (NED)
25 June 2022; 18:00	Report	Score by quarters: 4–5, 6–3, 2–2, 0–4			Sopron Lőver Pool, Sopron; Referees: Boris Margeta (SLO), Michiel Zwart (NED)
25 June 2022; 18:00	Report	Di Somma 3	Goals	Granados 3	Sopron Lőver Pool, Sopron; Referees: Boris Margeta (SLO), Michiel Zwart (NED)

Playoffs

27 June 2022; 17:00	Report	Italy	17–6	Australia	Alfréd Hajós National Swimming Stadium, Budapest; Referees: Frank Ohme (GER), Georgios Stavridis (GRE)
27 June 2022; 17:00	Report	Score by quarters: 4–0, 3–3, 4–1, 6–2			Alfréd Hajós National Swimming Stadium, Budapest; Referees: Frank Ohme (GER), Georgios Stavridis (GRE)
27 June 2022; 17:00	Report	Cannella, Del Lungo 3	Goals	Edwards 3	Alfréd Hajós National Swimming Stadium, Budapest; Referees: Frank Ohme (GER), Georgios Stavridis (GRE)

Quarterfinal

29 June 2022; 21:00	Report	Hungary	10–11	Italy	Alfréd Hajós National Swimming Stadium, Budapest; Referees: Boris Margeta (SLO), David Gómez (ESP)
29 June 2022; 21:00	Report	Score by quarters: 3–2, 2–4, 1–2, 4–3			Alfréd Hajós National Swimming Stadium, Budapest; Referees: Boris Margeta (SLO), David Gómez (ESP)
29 June 2022; 21:00	Report	Vámos 3	Goals	Di Fulvio 4	Alfréd Hajós National Swimming Stadium, Budapest; Referees: Boris Margeta (SLO), David Gómez (ESP)

Semifinals

1 July 2022; 16:00	Report	Italy	11–10	Greece	Alfréd Hajós National Swimming Stadium, Budapest; Referees: Michael Goldenberg (USA), Michiel Zwart (NED)
1 July 2022; 16:00	Report	Score by quarters: 4–2, 2–3, 1–1, 4–4			Alfréd Hajós National Swimming Stadium, Budapest; Referees: Michael Goldenberg (USA), Michiel Zwart (NED)
1 July 2022; 16:00	Report	Dolce 3	Goals	Vlachopoulos 3	Alfréd Hajós National Swimming Stadium, Budapest; Referees: Michael Goldenberg (USA), Michiel Zwart (NED)

Final

3 July 2022; 20:00	Report	Italy	14–15 (PSO)	Spain	Alfréd Hajós National Swimming Stadium, Budapest; Referees: Boris Margeta (SLO), Georgios Stavridis (GRE)
3 July 2022; 20:00	Report	Score by quarters: 3–3, 0–3, 3–2, 3–1 PSO: 5–6			Alfréd Hajós National Swimming Stadium, Budapest; Referees: Boris Margeta (SLO), Georgios Stavridis (GRE)
3 July 2022; 20:00	Report	Cannella 2	Goals	Granados 4	Alfréd Hajós National Swimming Stadium, Budapest; Referees: Boris Margeta (SLO), Georgios Stavridis (GRE)

=== Women's tournament ===
Team roster

The following is Italian roster in the Water polo at the 2022 World Aquatics Championships – Women's tournament.

Head coach: Carlo Silipo

- 1 Laura Teani GK
- 2 Chiara Tabani CB
- 3 Claudia Roberta Marletta D
- 4 Silvia Avegno D
- 5 Elisa Queirolo D
- 6 Sofia Giustini D
- 7 Domitilla Picozzi D
- 8 Roberta Bianconi D
- 9 Giulia Emmolo D
- 10 Valeria Palmieri CF
- 11 Giuditta Galardi CF
- 12 Giulia Viacava CB
- 13 Caterina Banchelli GK

Group A

Pos	Team	Pld	W	D	L	GF	GA	GD	Pts	Qualification
1	Italy	3	2	1	0	48	21	+27	5	Quarterfinals
2	Hungary (H)	3	2	0	1	55	21	+34	4	Playoffs
3	Canada	3	1	1	1	36	20	+16	3	Playoffs
4	Colombia	3	0	0	3	11	88	−77	0	

Source: Sportresult
Rules for classification: 1) points; 2) head-to-head points; 3) head-to-head goal difference; 4) head-to-head number of goals scored; 5) Goal difference.
(H) Hosts

20 June 2022; 19:30	Report	Canada	7–7	Italy	Alfréd Hajós National Swimming Stadium, Budapest; Referees: Georgios Stavridis (GRE), Andrew Carney (AUS)
20 June 2022; 19:30	Report	Score by quarters: 2–4, 3–2, 1–1, 1–0			Alfréd Hajós National Swimming Stadium, Budapest; Referees: Georgios Stavridis (GRE), Andrew Carney (AUS)
20 June 2022; 19:30	Report	McKelvey, Wright 2	Goals	Giustini 2	Alfréd Hajós National Swimming Stadium, Budapest; Referees: Georgios Stavridis (GRE), Andrew Carney (AUS)

22 June 2022; 21:00	Report	Italy	10–9	Hungary	Alfréd Hajós National Swimming Stadium, Budapest; Referees: Boris Margeta (SLO), Andrew Carney (AUS)
22 June 2022; 21:00	Report	Score by quarters: 3–4, 2–2, 3–1, 2–2			Alfréd Hajós National Swimming Stadium, Budapest; Referees: Boris Margeta (SLO), Andrew Carney (AUS)
22 June 2022; 21:00	Report	Avegno, Marletta 2	Goals	Parkes 3	Alfréd Hajós National Swimming Stadium, Budapest; Referees: Boris Margeta (SLO), Andrew Carney (AUS)

24 June 2022; 19:30	Report	Italy	31–5	Colombia	Alfréd Hajós National Swimming Stadium, Budapest; Referees: Anbar Anbar (KUW), Dion Willis (RSA)
24 June 2022; 19:30	Report	Score by quarters: 5–2, 7–0, 6–2, 13–1			Alfréd Hajós National Swimming Stadium, Budapest; Referees: Anbar Anbar (KUW), Dion Willis (RSA)
24 June 2022; 19:30	Report	Avegno 6	Goals	Restrepo 2	Alfréd Hajós National Swimming Stadium, Budapest; Referees: Anbar Anbar (KUW), Dion Willis (RSA)

Quarterfinals

28 June 2022; 13:00	Report	Italy	17–7	France	Alfréd Hajós National Swimming Stadium, Budapest; Referees: Helene Painchaud (CAN), Maro Savinović (CRO)
28 June 2022; 13:00	Report	Score by quarters: 3–2, 4–1, 6–1, 4–3			Alfréd Hajós National Swimming Stadium, Budapest; Referees: Helene Painchaud (CAN), Maro Savinović (CRO)
28 June 2022; 13:00	Report	Giustini 6	Goals	Guillet 4	Alfréd Hajós National Swimming Stadium, Budapest; Referees: Helene Painchaud (CAN), Maro Savinović (CRO)

Semifinals

30 June 2022; 16:00	Report	Italy	6–14	United States	Alfréd Hajós National Swimming Stadium, Budapest; Referees: Georgios Stavridis (GRE), David Gómez (ESP)
30 June 2022; 16:00	Report	Score by quarters: 0–3, 2–3, 1–4, 3–4			Alfréd Hajós National Swimming Stadium, Budapest; Referees: Georgios Stavridis (GRE), David Gómez (ESP)
30 June 2022; 16:00	Report	Avegno, Bianconi 2	Goals	five players 2	Alfréd Hajós National Swimming Stadium, Budapest; Referees: Georgios Stavridis (GRE), David Gómez (ESP)

Third place game

2 July 2022; 14:30	Report	Italy	5–7	Netherlands	Alfréd Hajós National Swimming Stadium, Budapest; Referees: Maro Savinović (CRO), Georgios Stavridis (GRE)
2 July 2022; 14:30	Report	Score by quarters: 2–1, 2–1, 0–2, 1–3			Alfréd Hajós National Swimming Stadium, Budapest; Referees: Maro Savinović (CRO), Georgios Stavridis (GRE)
2 July 2022; 14:30	Report	Giustini, Marletta 2	Goals	seven players 1	Alfréd Hajós National Swimming Stadium, Budapest; Referees: Maro Savinović (CRO), Georgios Stavridis (GRE)

== See also ==
- Italy national swimming team
- Italy men's national water polo team
- Italy women's national water polo team
