= Swimming at the 2022 World Aquatics Championships – Women's 50 metre freestyle =

Women's 50 metre freestyle at the 2022 World Aquatics Championships
- Venue: Danube Arena
- Location: Budapest, Hungary
- Dates: 24 June (heats and semifinals); 25 June (final)
- Competitors: 82 from 80 nations
- Winning time: 23.98

Medalists
| gold medal | Sarah Sjöström | Sweden |
| silver medal | Katarzyna Wasick | Poland |
| bronze medal | Erika Brown | United States |
| bronze medal | Meg Harris | Australia |

The Women's 50 metre freestyle competition at the 2022 World Aquatics Championships was held on 24 and 25 June 2022.

== Records ==
Prior to the competition, the existing world and championship records were as follows.

| World record | Sarah Sjöström (SWE) | 23.67 | Budapest, Hungary | 29 July 2017 |
| Competition record | Sarah Sjöström (SWE) | 23.67 | Budapest, Hungary | 29 July 2017 |

== Results ==
=== Heats ===
The heats were started on 24 June at 09:00.

| Rank | Heat | Lane | Name | Nationality | Time | Notes |
|---|---|---|---|---|---|---|
| 1 | 10 | 4 | Sarah Sjöström | Sweden | 24.40 | Q |
| 2 | 8 | 4 | Katarzyna Wasick | Poland | 24.45 | Q |
| 3 | 9 | 3 | Meg Harris | Australia | 24.68 | Q |
| 4 | 10 | 3 | Erika Brown | United States | 24.71 | Q |
| 5 | 10 | 5 | Zhang Yufei | China | 24.81 | Q |
| 6 | 8 | 3 | Anna Hopkin | Great Britain | 24.82 | Q |
| 7 | 8 | 6 | Emma Chelius | South Africa | 24.87 | Q |
| 8 | 8 | 5 | Torri Huske | United States | 24.91 | Q |
| 9 | 9 | 2 | Julie Kepp Jensen | Denmark | 25.04 | Q |
| 9 | 9 | 6 | Valerie van Roon | Netherlands | 25.04 | Q |
| 11 | 10 | 7 | Kim Busch | Netherlands | 25.06 | Q |
| 12 | 10 | 0 | Kalia Antoniou | Cyprus | 25.14 | Q, NR |
| 13 | 10 | 2 | Kayla Sanchez | Canada | 25.15 | Q, WD |
| 14 | 9 | 1 | Petra Senánszky | Hungary | 25.24 | Q |
| 15 | 8 | 7 | Silvia Di Pietro | Italy | 25.33 | Q |
| 16 | 10 | 6 | Marie Wattel | France | 25.34 | Q |
| 17 | 9 | 7 | Lorrane Ferreira | Brazil | 25.36 | Q |
| 18 | 8 | 2 | Rika Omoto | Japan | 25.38 | |
| 19 | 10 | 1 | Neža Klančar | Slovenia | 25.47 | |
| 20 | 8 | 1 | Jeong So-eun | South Korea | 25.53 | |
| 21 | 7 | 5 | Sasha Touretski | Switzerland | 25.68 | |
| 22 | 9 | 9 | Amanda Lim | Singapore | 25.85 | |
| 23 | 8 | 9 | Chelsey Edwards | New Zealand | 25.91 | |
| 24 | 7 | 0 | Daria Golovaty | Israel | 25.97 | |
| 24 | 7 | 4 | Diana Petkova | Bulgaria | 25.97 | |
| 26 | 7 | 6 | Cherelle Thompson | Trinidad and Tobago | 26.01 | |
| 27 | 7 | 1 | Maddy Moore | Bermuda | 26.04 | |
| 28 | 8 | 0 | Amel Melih | Algeria | 26.07 | |
| 29 | 7 | 3 | Huang Mei-chien | Chinese Taipei | 26.12 | |
| 30 | 9 | 8 | Jenjira Srisaard | Thailand | 26.13 | |
| 31 | 10 | 9 | Anicka Delgado | Ecuador | 26.18 | |
| 32 | 7 | 2 | Jasmine Alkhaldi | Philippines | 26.20 | |
| 32 | 7 | 7 | Camille Cheng | Hong Kong | 26.20 | |
| 34 | 7 | 9 | Gabriela Ņikitina | Latvia | 26.25 | |
| 34 | 8 | 8 | Rūta Meilutytė | Lithuania | 26.25 | |
| 36 | 6 | 3 | Kirabo Namutebi | Uganda | 26.26 | |
| 37 | 6 | 4 | Rafaela Fernandini | Peru | 26.31 | |
| 38 | 6 | 5 | Nikol Merizaj | Albania | 26.44 | |
| 39 | 7 | 8 | Karen Torrez | Bolivia | 26.46 | |
| 40 | 6 | 7 | Kenisha Gupta | India | 26.72 | |
| 41 | 6 | 1 | Jillian Crooks | Cayman Islands | 26.75 | |
| 42 | 6 | 6 | Chloe Farro | Aruba | 26.98 | |
| 43 | 6 | 2 | Norah Milanesi | Cameroon | 26.99 | |
| 44 | 5 | 6 | Varsenik Manucharyan | Armenia | 27.08 | |
| 45 | 6 | 0 | Mikaili Charlemagne | Saint Lucia | 27.16 | |
| 46 | 6 | 8 | Maria Schutzmeier | Nicaragua | 27.20 | |
| 47 | 5 | 4 | Maxine Egner | Botswana | 27.37 | |
| 48 | 6 | 9 | Marie Khoury | Lebanon | 27.40 | |
| 49 | 2 | 3 | Olivia Fuller | Antigua and Barbuda | 27.81 | |
| 50 | 5 | 5 | Cheyenne Rova | Fiji | 27.82 | |
| 51 | 5 | 3 | Lina Khiyara | Morocco | 27.83 | |
| 52 | 1 | 3 | Lucia Ruchti | Suspended Member Federation | 27.92 | |
| 53 | 2 | 4 | Hana Beiqi | Kosovo | 28.03 | |
| 54 | 4 | 4 | Nomvula Mjimba | Zimbabwe | 28.13 | |
| 55 | 5 | 8 | Dorcas Oka | Nigeria | 28.14 | |
| 56 | 5 | 1 | Khema Elizabeth | Seychelles | 28.18 | |
| 57 | 5 | 0 | Jovana Kuljača | Montenegro | 28.37 | |
| 58 | 5 | 9 | Georgia-Leigh Vele | Papua New Guinea | 28.46 | |
| 59 | 4 | 5 | Antsa Rabejaona | Madagascar | 28.51 | |
| 60 | 1 | 4 | Marina Abu Shamaleh | Palestine | 28.52 | |
| 61 | 5 | 7 | Bisma Khan | Pakistan | 28.57 | |
| 62 | 4 | 3 | Vorleak Sok | Cambodia | 28.62 | |
| 63 | 4 | 2 | Ariel Rodrigues | Guyana | 28.71 | |
| 64 | 3 | 7 | Ayah Binrajab | Brunei | 28.81 | |
| 65 | 5 | 2 | Yusra Mardini | FINA Refugee Team | 28.95 | |
| 66 | 2 | 8 | Ekaterina Bordachyova | Tajikistan | 29.10 | |
| 67 | 3 | 9 | Kaya Forson | Ghana | 29.25 | |
| 68 | 4 | 6 | Nafissath Radji | Benin | 29.38 | |
| 69 | 4 | 8 | Taffi Illis | Sint Maarten | 30.00 | |
| 70 | 1 | 5 | Sonia Aktar | Bangladesh | 30.05 | |
| 71 | 2 | 5 | Hamna Ahmed | Maldives | 30.61 | |
| 72 | 4 | 1 | Tayamika Chang'anamuno | Malawi | 30.81 | |
| 73 | 3 | 1 | Eunike Fugo | Tanzania | 31.06 | |
| 74 | 3 | 0 | Jinie Thompson | Northern Mariana Islands | 31.36 | |
| 75 | 3 | 5 | Jennifer Lynn Harding-Marlin | Saint Kitts and Nevis | 31.80 | |
| 76 | 4 | 0 | Alyse Maniriho | Burundi | 31.82 | |
| 77 | 2 | 0 | Yuri Hosei | Palau | 32.05 | |
| 78 | 2 | 2 | Kayla Hepler | Marshall Islands | 33.05 | |
| 79 | 3 | 4 | Roukaya Mahamane | Niger | 33.31 | NR |
| 80 | 3 | 3 | Brhane Demeke Amare | Ethiopia | 34.92 | |
| 81 | 2 | 9 | Maesha Saadi | Comoros | 35.26 | |
| 82 | 3 | 6 | Rita Ekomba Ocomo | Equatorial Guinea | 43.27 | |
| | 2 | 1 | Sainabou Sam | Gambia | Did not start | |
| | 2 | 6 | Lucie Kouadio | Ivory Coast | Did not start | |
| | 2 | 7 | Marie Amenou | Togo | Did not start | |
| | 3 | 2 | Mashael Al-Ayed | Saudi Arabia | Did not start | |
| | 3 | 8 | Vanessa Bobimbo Loufouimpou | Republic of the Congo | Did not start | |
| | 4 | 7 | Iman Kouraogo | Burkina Faso | Did not start | |
| | 4 | 9 | Chloe Sauvourel | Central African Republic | Did not start | |
| | 9 | 0 | Theodora Drakou | Greece | Did not start | |
| | 9 | 4 | Shayna Jack | Australia | Did not start | |
| | 9 | 5 | Cheng Yujie | China | Did not start | |
| | 10 | 8 | Farida Osman | Egypt | Did not start | |

=== Semifinals ===
The semifinals were started on 24 June at 18:17.

| Rank | Heat | Lane | Name | Nationality | Time | Notes |
|---|---|---|---|---|---|---|
| 1 | 1 | 4 | Katarzyna Wasick | Poland | 24.11 | Q, NR |
| 2 | 2 | 4 | Sarah Sjöström | Sweden | 24.15 | Q |
| 3 | 2 | 5 | Meg Harris | Australia | 24.39 | Q |
| 4 | 1 | 5 | Erika Brown | United States | 24.59 | Q |
| 5 | 1 | 3 | Anna Hopkin | Great Britain | 24.60 | Q |
| 5 | 2 | 3 | Zhang Yufei | China | 24.60 | Q |
| 7 | 1 | 6 | Torri Huske | United States | 24.63 | Q |
| 8 | 2 | 2 | Julie Kepp Jensen | Denmark | 24.86 | Q |
| 9 | 2 | 6 | Emma Chelius | South Africa | 24.87 | |
| 10 | 1 | 7 | Kalia Antoniou | Cyprus | 24.94 | NR |
| 11 | 2 | 1 | Petra Senánszky | Hungary | 24.95 | |
| 12 | 2 | 8 | Marie Wattel | France | 25.04 | |
| 13 | 1 | 2 | Valerie van Roon | Netherlands | 25.19 | |
| 13 | 2 | 7 | Kim Busch | Netherlands | 25.19 | |
| 15 | 1 | 8 | Lorrane Ferreira | Brazil | 25.24 | |
| – | 1 | 1 | Silvia Di Pietro | Italy | Disqualified | |

=== Final ===
The final was held on 25 June at 18:47.

| Rank | Lane | Name | Nationality | Time | Notes |
|---|---|---|---|---|---|
| 1st place, gold medalist(s) | 5 | Sarah Sjöström | Sweden | 23.98 | |
| 2nd place, silver medalist(s) | 4 | Katarzyna Wasick | Poland | 24.18 | |
| 3rd place, bronze medalist(s) | 3 | Meg Harris | Australia | 24.38 | |
| 3rd place, bronze medalist(s) | 6 | Erika Brown | United States | 24.38 | |
| 5 | 7 | Zhang Yufei | China | 24.57 | |
| 6 | 1 | Torri Huske | United States | 24.64 | |
| 7 | 2 | Anna Hopkin | Great Britain | 24.71 | |
| 8 | 8 | Julie Kepp Jensen | Denmark | 24.96 | |
