= Swimming at the 2022 World Aquatics Championships – Men's 400 metre freestyle =

Men's World Aquatic Championships 2022

Men's 400 metre freestyle at the 2022 World Aquatics Championships
- Venue: Danube Arena
- Location: Budapest, Hungary
- Dates: 18 June (heats and final)
- Competitors: 42 from 37 nations
- Winning time: 3:41.22

Medalists
gold medal	Elijah Winnington	Australia
silver medal	Lukas Märtens	Germany
bronze medal	Guilherme Costa	Brazil

The Men's 400 metre freestyle competition at the 2022 World Aquatics Championships was held on 18 June 2022.

== Records ==
Prior to the competition, the existing world and championship records were as follows.

World record	Paul Biedermann (GER)	3:40.07	Rome, Italy	26 July 2009
Competition record	Paul Biedermann (GER)	3:40.07	Rome, Italy	26 July 2009

== Results ==
=== Heats ===
The heats were started at 09:16.

Rank	Heat	Lane	Name	Nationality	Time	Notes
1	4	5	Felix Auböck	Austria	3:43.83	Q, NR
2	4	4	Elijah Winnington	Australia	3:44.42	Q
3	4	2	Guilherme Costa	Brazil	3:44.52	Q, SA
4	5	4	Lukas Märtens	Germany	3:45.04	Q
5	4	3	Kieran Smith	United States	3:45.70	Q
6	3	4	Kim Woo-min	South Korea	3:45.87	Q
7	4	1	Trey Freeman	United States	3:46.12	Q
8	5	6	Marco De Tullio	Italy	3:46.47	Q
9	5	3	Mack Horton	Australia	3:46.57	
10	5	2	Antonio Djakovic	Switzerland	3:46.90	
11	5	5	Henning Mühlleitner	Germany	3:47.17	
12	5	7	Lorenzo Galossi	Italy	3:47.19	
13	5	8	Marwan Elkamash	Egypt	3:47.21	
14	4	7	Daniel Jervis	Great Britain	3:48.66	
15	3	2	Khiew Hoe Yean	Malaysia	3:48.72	NR
16	3	9	Bar Soloveychik	Israel	3:49.87	
17	3	5	Dimitrios Markos	Greece	3:49.93	
18	4	6	Danas Rapšys	Lithuania	3:50.03	
19	5	1	Henrik Christiansen	Norway	3:50.18	
20	5	0	Kregor Zirk	Estonia	3:50.62	
21	3	6	Jeremy Bagshaw	Canada	3:50.77	
22	3	8	Juan Morales	Colombia	3:51.50	
23	4	8	Ji Xinjie	China	3:51.84	
24	4	9	Mykhailo Romanchuk	Ukraine	3:52.92	
25	5	9	Zhang Ziyang	China	3:53.55	
26	4	0	Nguyễn Huy Hoàng	Vietnam	3:54.05	
27	2	5	Glen Lim Jun Wei	Singapore	3:54.63	
28	2	1	Pavel Alovatki	Moldova	3:55.64	
29	3	0	Yordan Yanchev	Bulgaria	3:56.52	
30	3	1	José Paulo Lopes	Portugal	3:56.59	
31	2	2	Tonnam Kanteemool	Thailand	3:56.96	
32	3	7	Cheuk Ming Ho	Hong Kong	3:58.38	
33	2	3	Kushagra Rawat	India	3:59.69	
34	2	4	Wesley Roberts	Cook Islands	4:00.67	
35	2	6	Irakli Revishvili	Georgia	4:02.01	
36	2	7	Adib Khalil	Lebanon	4:02.64	
37	2	8	Noah Mascoll-Gomes	Antigua and Barbuda	4:02.93	
38	2	0	Loris Bianchi	San Marino	4:04.57	
39	2	9	Ramazan Omarov	Kyrgyzstan	4:16.22	
40	1	3	Muhammad Siddiqui	Pakistan	4:18.03	
41	1	4	Haziq Samil	Brunei	4:23.59	
42	1	5	Charles Bennici	Cambodia	4:26.82	
—	3	3	Matthew Sates	South Africa	DNS	

=== Final ===
The final was held at 18:02.

Rank	Lane	Name	Nationality	Time	Notes
1st place, gold medalist(s)	5	Elijah Winnington	Australia	3:41.22	
2nd place, silver medalist(s)	6	Lukas Märtens	Germany	3:42.85	
3rd place, bronze medalist(s)	3	Guilherme Costa	Brazil	3:43.31	SA
4	4	Felix Auböck	Austria	3:43.58	NR
5	8	Marco De Tullio	Italy	3:44.14	
6	7	Kim Woo-min	South Korea	3:45.64	
7	2	Kieran Smith	United States	3:46.43	
8	1	Trey Freeman	United States	3:46.53	
