= China at the 2022 World Aquatics Championships =

- Flag of China
- FINA code: CHN
- National federation: Chinese Swimming Association
- Website: swimming.org.cn

in Budapest, Hungary
- Competitors: 51 in 5 sports
- Medals Ranked 2nd: Gold 18 Silver 2 Bronze 8 Total 28

World Aquatics Championships appearances
- 1973; 1975; 1978; 1982; 1986; 1991; 1994; 1998; 2001; 2003; 2005; 2007; 2009; 2011; 2013; 2015; 2017; 2019; 2022; 2023; 2024

China competed at the 2022 World Aquatics Championships in Budapest, Hungary from 18 June to 3 July.

== Medalists ==
Medal	Name	Sport	Event	Date
Gold	Wang Liuyi; Wang Qianyi	Artistic swimming	Duet technical routine	June 19
Gold	Chang Hao; Feng Yu; Wang Ciyue; Wang Liuyi; Wang Qianyi; Xiang Binxuan; Xiao Yanning; Zhang Yayi	Artistic swimming	Team technical routine	June 21
Gold	Yang Junxuan	Swimming	Women's 200 metre freestyle	June 21
Gold	Wang Liuyi; Wang Qianyi	Artistic swimming	Duet free routine	June 23
Gold	Chang Hao; Feng Yu; Wang Ciyue; Wang Liuyi; Wang Qianyi; Xiang Binxuan; Xiao Yanning; Zhang Yayi	Artistic swimming	Team free routine	June 21
Gold	Cao Yuan; Wang Zongyuan	Diving	Men's synchronized 3 metre springboard	June 26
Gold	Chen Yuxi	Diving	Women's 10 metre platform	June 27
Gold	Wang Zongyuan	Diving	Men's 3 metre springboard	June 28
Gold	Lian Junjie; Yang Hao	Diving	Men's synchronized 10 metre platform	June 28
Gold	Quan Hongchan; Bai Yuming	Diving	Team event	June 29
Gold	Li Yajie	Diving	Women's 1 metre springboard	June 29
Gold	Zhu Zifeng; Lin Shan	Diving	Mixed synchronized 3 metre springboard	June 29
Gold	Quan Hongchan; Chen Yuxi	Diving	Women's synchronized 10 metre platform	June 30
Gold	Wang Zongyuan	Diving	Men's 1 metre springboard	June 30
Gold	Ren Qian; Duan Yu	Diving	Mixed synchronized 10 metre platform	July 1
Gold	Chen Yiwen	Diving	Women's 3 metre springboard	July 2
Gold	Chen Yiwen; Chang Yani	Diving	Women's synchronized 3 metre springboard	July 3
Gold	Yang Jian	Diving	Men's 10 metre platform	July 3
Silver	Quan Hongchan	Diving	Women's 10 metre platform	June 27
Silver	Cao Yuan	Diving	Men's 3 metre springboard	June 28
Bronze	Zhang Yufei	Swimming	Women's 100 metre butterfly	June 19
Bronze	Shi Haoyu; Zhang Yiyao	Artistic swimming	Mixed duet technical routine	June 20
Bronze	Tang Muhan	Swimming	Women's 200 metre freestyle	June 21
Bronze	Zhang Yufei	Swimming	Women's 200 metre butterfly	June 22
Bronze	Zhang Yufei	Swimming	Women's 50 metre butterfly	June 22
Bronze	Shi Haoyu; Zhang Yiyao	Artistic swimming	Mixed duet free routine	June 25
Bronze	Chang Yani	Diving	Women's 3 metre springboard	July 2
Bronze	Yang Hao	Diving	Men's 10 metre platform	July 3

== Artistic swimming ==
Women

Athlete	Event	Preliminaries		Final	
Athlete	Event	Points	Rank	Points	Rank
Wang Liuyi; Wang Qianyi	Duet technical routine	92.6378	1Q	93.7536	1st place, gold medalist(s)
Wang Liuyi; Wang Qianyi	Duet free routine	94.5667	1Q	95.5667	1st place, gold medalist(s)
Chang Hao; Feng Yu; Wang Ciyue; Wang Liuyi; Wang Qianyi; Xiang Binxuan; Xiao Yanning; Zhang Yayi	Team technical routine	94.0039	1Q	94.7202	1st place, gold medalist(s)
Chang Hao; Feng Yu; Wang Ciyue; Wang Liuyi; Wang Qianyi; Xiang Binxuan; Xiao Yanning; Zhang Yayi	Team free routine	95.8000	1Q	96.7000	1st place, gold medalist(s)

Mixed

Athlete	Event	Preliminary		Final	
Athlete	Event	Points	Rank	Points	Rank
Shi Haoyu; Zhang Yiyao	Mixed duet technical routine	84.8232	3Q	86.4425	3rd place, bronze medalist(s)
Shi Haoyu; Zhang Yiyao	Mixed duet free routine	87.8333	3Q	88.4000	3rd place, bronze medalist(s)

== Diving ==
Men

Athlete	Event	Preliminaries		Semifinals		Final	
Athlete	Event	Points	Rank	Points	Rank	Points	Rank
Wang Zongyuan	Men's 1 metre springboard	380.95	2Q	—		493.30	1st place, gold medalist(s)
Zheng Jiuyuan	Men's 1 metre springboard	375.75	3Q	—		365.55	8
Cao Yuan	Men's 3 metre springboard	418.55	3Q	482.50	2Q	492.85	2nd place, silver medalist(s)
Wang Zongyuan	Men's 3 metre springboard	492.00	1Q	547.95	1Q	561.95	1st place, gold medalist(s)
Yang Jian	Men's 10 metre platform	495.65	1Q	503.85	2Q	515.55	1st place, gold medalist(s)
Yang Hao	Men's 10 metre platform	468.20	2Q	520.30	1Q	485.45	3rd place, bronze medalist(s)
Wang Zongyuan; Cao Yuan	Men's synchronized 3 metre springboard	446.07	1Q	—		459.18	1st place, gold medalist(s)
Lian Junjie; Yang Hao	Men's synchronized 10 metre platform	452.25	1Q	—		467.79	1st place, gold medalist(s)

Women

Athlete	Event	Preliminaries		Semifinals		Final	
Athlete	Event	Points	Rank	Points	Rank	Points	Rank
Li Yajie	Women's 1 metre springboard	278.95	1Q	—		300.85	1st place, gold medalist(s)
Lin Shan	Women's 1 metre springboard	Withdrew					
Chang Yani	Women's 3 metre springboard	341.25	2Q	345.80	2Q	325.85	3rd place, bronze medalist(s)
Chen Yiwen	Women's 3 metre springboard	357.95	1Q	356.45	1Q	366.90	1st place, gold medalist(s)
Chen Yuxi	Women's 10 metre platform	413.95	1Q	427.00	1Q	417.25	1st place, gold medalist(s)
Quan Hongchan	Women's 10 metre platform	410.85	2Q	413.70	2Q	416.95	2nd place, silver medalist(s)
Chen Yiwen; Chang Yani	Women's synchronized 3 metre springboard	317.73	1Q	—		343.14	1st place, gold medalist(s)
Quan Hongchan; Chen Yuxi	Women's synchronized 10 metre platform	352.08	1Q	—		368.40	1st place, gold medalist(s)

Mixed

Athlete	Event	Final	
Athlete	Event	Points	Rank
Lin Shan; Zhu Jifeng	Mixed synchronized 3 metre springboard	324.15	1st place, gold medalist(s)
Ren Qian; Duan Yu	Mixed synchronized 10 metre platform	341.16	1st place, gold medalist(s)
~~Zhang Jiaqi~~; Quan Hongchan; Bai Yuming	Team event	391.40	1st place, gold medalist(s)

== Open water swimming ==
Men

Athlete	Event	Time	Rank
Meng Rui	Men's 5 km	56:24.20	17
Zhao Yubohang	Men's 5 km	56:26.50	19
Tao Haoyang	Men's 10 km	2:01:20.40	35
Zhang Ziyang	Men's 10 km	2:00:54.70	33
Lu Mingyi	Men's 25 km	Withdrew	
Zhang Jinhou	Men's 25 km	5:14:04.70	18

Women

Athlete	Event	Time	Rank
Ma Xiaoming	Women's 5 km	1:00:59.00	22
Tian Muran	Women's 5 km	Withdrew	
Sun Jiake	Women's 10 km	2:05:23.60	20
Xin Xin	Women's 10 km	2:06:48.00	24
Cheng Hanyu	Women's 25 km	5:49:25.90	11
Wang Kexin	Women's 25 km	5:49:59.20	12

Mixed

Athlete	Event	Time	Rank
Zhang Ziyang; Tang Haoyang; Sun Jiake; Xin Xin	Team	1:06:21.80	8

== Swimming ==
China entered 34 swimmers.

Men

Athlete	Event	Heat		Semifinal		Final	
Athlete	Event	Time	Rank	Time	Rank	Time	Rank
Chen Juner	100 m butterfly	52.91	29	did not advance			
Chen Juner	200 m butterfly	1:58.31	21	did not advance			
Cheng Long	1500 m freestyle	did not start		—		did not advance	
Ji Xinjie	200 m freestyle	1:47.71	19	did not advance			
Ji Xinjie	400 m freestyle	3:51.84	23	—		did not advance	
Liu Zongyu	400 m individual medley	4:20.53	19	—		did not advance	
Niu Guangsheng	200 m butterfly	1:56.48	13 Q	1:55.27	10		
Pan Zhanle	100 m freestyle	48.19	6Q	47.65 =NR	5 Q	47.79	4
Qin Haiyang	200 m breaststroke	2:13.35	22	did not advance			
Qin Haiyang	200 m individual medley	1:59.68	18	did not advance			
Sun Jiajun	50 m butterfly	23.83	32	did not advance			
Wang Changhao	50 m freestyle	22.68	38	did not advance			
Wang Changhao	100 m butterfly	52.15	17	did not advance			
Wang Shun	200 m individual medley	1:59.51	15 Q	2:00.71	15	did not advance	
Wang Shun	400 m individual medley	4:17.85	14	—		did not advance	
Xu Jiayu	50 m backstroke	25.12	14 Q	24.90	12	did not advance	
Xu Jiayu	100 m backstroke	53.45	7 Q	53.49	10	did not advance	
Yan Zibei	50 m breaststroke	27.15	7 Q	27.07	6 Q	27.18	7
Yan Zibei	100 m breaststroke	59.83	5 Q	59.34	5 Q	59.22	5
Zhang Zhoujian	50 m freestyle	22.75	44	did not advance			
Zhang Ziyang	400 m freestyle	3:53.55	25	—		did not advance	
Zhang Ziyang	800 m freestyle	8:04.18	18	—		did not advance	
Yang Jintong; Hou Yujie; Hong Jinquan; Pan Zhanle	4 × 100 m freestyle relay	3:15.39	10	—		did not advance	
Hong Jinquan; Zhang Ziyang; Chen Juner; Pan Zhanle	4 × 200 m freestyle relay	7:09.53	5 Q	—		7:10.93	8
Wang Shun; Qin Haiyang; Wang Changhao; Pan Zhanle; Xu Jiayu*	4 × 100 m medley relay	3:33.61	6 Q	—		3:34.62	8

Women

Athlete	Event	Heat		Semifinal		Final	
Athlete	Event	Time	Rank	Time	Rank	Time	Rank
Chen Jie	50 m backstroke	27.95	9 Q	27.83	11	did not advance	
Cheng Yujie	50 m freestyle	did not start		did not advance			
Cheng Yujie	100 m freestyle	54.28	11 Q	53.36	5 Q	53.58	5
Ge Chutong	200 m individual medley	2:12.98	14 Q	2:14.06	16	did not advance	
Ge Chutong	400 m individual medley	4:38.95	4 Q	—		4:38.37	6
Li Bingjie	400 m freestyle	4:08.25	10	—		did not advance	
Li Bingjie	800 m freestyle	8:27.19	4 Q	—		8:23.15	5
Li Bingjie	1500 m freestyle	16:13.92	9	—		did not advance	
Liu Yaxin	200 m backstroke	did not start		did not advance			
Peng Xuwei	100 m backstroke	59.93	7 Q	59.96	7 Q	1:00.01	7
Peng Xuwei	200 m backstroke	2:08.53	2 Q	2:09.19	5 Q	2:09.13	6
Tang Muhan	200 m freestyle	1:58.28	12 Q	1:56.87	8 Q	1:56.25	3rd place, bronze medalist(s)
Tang Muhan	400 m freestyle	4:06.29	7 Q	—		4:10.70	8
Tang Muhan	800 m freestyle	8:39.46	14	—		did not advance	
Tang Qianting	50 m breaststroke	30.36	5 Q	30.10	4 Q	30.21	4
Tang Qianting	100 m breaststroke	1:05.99	1 Q	1:05.97	3 Q	1:06.41	7
Tang Qianting	200 m breaststroke	2:29.35	21	did not advance			
Wan Letian	100 m backstroke	59.67	4 Q	59.63	6 Q	59.77	4
Yang Junxuan	100 m freestyle	54.18	8 WD	did not advance			
Yang Junxuan	200 m freestyle	1:56.58	1 Q	1:56.75	5 Q	1:54.92	1st place, gold medalist(s)
Yu Jingyao	100 m breaststroke	1:07.19	15 Q	1:06.78	14	did not advance	
Yu Jingyao	200 m breaststroke	2:26.07	10 Q	2:26.10	11	did not advance	
Zhang Ke	1500 m freestyle	16:42.92	16	—		did not advance	
Zhang Yufei	50 m freestyle	24.81	5 Q	24.60	5 Q	24.57	5
Zhang Yufei	50 m butterfly	25.39	1 Q	25.54	5 Q	25.32	3rd place, bronze medalist(s)
Zhang Yufei	100 m butterfly	57.37	3 Q	57.03	6 Q	56.41	3rd place, bronze medalist(s)
Zhang Yufei	200 m butterfly	2:09.21	6 Q	2:07.76	5 Q	2:06.32	3rd place, bronze medalist(s)
Zhu Jiaming	200 m butterfly	2:11.20	13 Q	2:11.19	14	did not advance	
Zhang Yufei; Zhu Menghui; Yang Junxuan; Cheng Yujie; Ai Yanhan*; Lao Lihui*	4 × 100 m freestyle relay	3:36.66	5 Q	—		3:35.25	4
Tang Muhan; Li Bingjie; Ai Yanhan; Yang Junxuan; Lao Lihui*; Ge Chutong*	4 × 200 m freestyle relay	7:49.08	2 Q	—		7:45.72	4
Peng Xuwei; Tang Qianting; Zhang Yufei; Yang Junxuan; Peng Xuwei * Yu Jingyao*	4 × 100 m medley relay	3:59.55	6 Q	—		3:57.73	6

Mixed

Athlete	Event	Heat		Final	
Athlete	Event	Time	Rank	Time	Rank
Hong Jinquan; Wang Changhao; Lao Lihui; Ai Yanhan	4 × 100 m freestyle relay	3:27.20	8 Q	3:26.92	8
Xu Jiayu; Yan Zibei; Zhang Yufei; Cheng Yujie; Xu Jiayu*; Yu Jingyao*; Wang Changhao*	4 × 100 m medley relay	3:44.92	5 Q	3:43.55	6

Legend: (*) = Swimmers who participated in the heat only.

== Water polo ==
=== Women's tournament ===
Summary

Key:
- FT – After full time.
- P – Match decided by penalty-shootout.

Team	Event	Group stage					Quarterfinals	Semifinal / Cl	Final / BM / Pl	
Team	Event	Opposition Score	Opposition Score	Opposition Score	Opposition Score	Rank	Opposition Score	Opposition Score	Opposition Score	Rank
China women's	Women's tournament	Withdrew								
