= Swimming at the 2022 World Aquatics Championships – Women's 800 metre freestyle =

Women's 800 metre freestyle at the 2022 World Aquatics Championships
- Venue: Danube Arena
- Location: Budapest, Hungary
- Dates: 23 June (heats); 24 June (final)
- Competitors: 21 from 17 nations
- Winning time: 8:08.04

Medalists
gold medal	Katie Ledecky	United States
silver medal	Kiah Melverton	Australia
bronze medal	Simona Quadarella	Italy

The Women's 800 metre freestyle competition at the 2022 World Aquatics Championships was held on 23 and 24 June 2022.

== Records ==
Prior to the competition, the existing world and championship records were as follows.

World record	Katie Ledecky (USA)	8:04.79	Rio de Janeiro, Brazil	12 August 2016
Competition record	Katie Ledecky (USA)	8:07.39	Kazan, Russia	8 August 2015

== Results ==
=== Heats ===
The heats were started on 23 June at 10:31.

Rank	Heat	Lane	Name	Nationality	Time	Notes
1	3	4	Katie Ledecky	United States	8:17.51	Q
2	3	3	Lani Pallister	Australia	8:24.66	
3	2	5	Leah Smith	United States	8:25.19	Q
4	3	5	Li Bingjie	China	8:27.19	Q
5	3	6	Isabel Marie Gose	Germany	8:27.69	Q
6	3	7	Eve Thomas	New Zealand	8:27.82	Q
7	2	4	Simona Quadarella	Italy	8:27.96	Q
8	2	3	Kiah Melverton	Australia	8:30.68	Q
9	2	7	Viviane Jungblut	Brazil	8:32.26	Q
10	2	2	Miyu Namba	Japan	8:32.91	
11	3	1	Kristel Köbrich	Chile	8:37.02	
12	3	2	Ajna Késely	Hungary	8:38.64	
13	3	8	Gabrielle Roncatto	Brazil	8:38.65	
14	2	6	Tang Muhan	China	8:39.46	
15	2	0	Diana Durães	Portugal	8:41.37	
16	2	8	Ángela Martínez	Spain	8:45.12	
17	3	0	Katrina Bellio	Canada	8:45.67	
18	3	9	Han Da-kyung	South Korea	8:49.18	
19	1	4	Arianna Valloni	San Marino	8:59.95	
20	1	5	Võ Thị Mỹ Thiện	Vietnam	9:12.87	
21	1	3	Vár Erlingsdóttir Eidesgaard	Faroe Islands	9:16.94	
	1	2	Talita Te Flan	Ivory Coast	did not start	
	1	6	Arianna Lont	Sint Maarten	did not start	
	2	1	Paula Otero	Spain	did not start	
	2	9	Gan Ching Hwee	Singapore	did not start	

=== Final ===
The final was held on 24 June at 19:26.

Rank	Lane	Name	Nationality	Time	Notes
1st place, gold medalist(s)	4	Katie Ledecky	United States	8:08.04	
2nd place, silver medalist(s)	1	Kiah Melverton	Australia	8:18.77	
3rd place, bronze medalist(s)	7	Simona Quadarella	Italy	8:19.00	
4	5	Leah Smith	United States	8:20.04	
5	3	Li Bingjie	China	8:23.15	
6	6	Isabel Marie Gose	Germany	8:23.78	
7	2	Eve Thomas	New Zealand	8:30.37	
8	8	Viviane Jungblut	Brazil	8:37.04	
