= Swimming at the 2022 World Aquatics Championships – Men's 100 metre freestyle =

Men's 100 metre freestyle at the 2022 World Aquatics Championships
- Venue: Danube Arena
- Location: Budapest, Hungary
- Dates: 21 June (heats and semifinals); 22 June (final)
- Competitors: 99 from 90 nations
- Winning time: 47.58

Medalists
gold medal	David Popovici	Romania
silver medal	Maxime Grousset	France
bronze medal	Joshua Liendo	Canada

The Men's 100 metre freestyle competition at the 2022 World Aquatics Championships was held on 21 and 22 June 2022.

== Records ==
Prior to the competition, the existing world and championship records were as follows.

World record	César Cielo (BRA)	46.91	Rome, Italy	30 July 2009
Competition record	César Cielo (BRA)	46.91	Rome, Italy	30 July 2009

== Results ==
=== Heats ===
The heats were started on 21 June at 09:09.

Rank	Heat	Lane	Name	Nationality	Time	Notes
1	10	4	David Popovici	Romania	47.60	Q
2	11	4	Caeleb Dressel	United States	47.95	Q, WD
3	10	3	Andrej Barna	Serbia	48.15	Q
4	10	6	Joshua Liendo	Canada	48.16	Q
5	11	5	Maxime Grousset	France	48.17	Q
6	11	0	Pan Zhanle	China	48.19	Q
7	11	6	Jacob Whittle	Great Britain	48.23	Q
8	10	7	Lorenzo Zazzeri	Italy	48.29	Q
9	10	5	Nándor Németh	Hungary	48.33	Q
10	9	3	Brooks Curry	United States	48.38	Q
11	8	3	Mikel Schreuders	Aruba	48.40	Q, NR
11	10	0	Dylan Carter	Trinidad and Tobago	48.40	Q, NR
13	11	1	Szebasztián Szabó	Hungary	48.47	Q
14	9	5	Lewis Burras	Great Britain	48.49	Q
14	10	2	Ruslan Gaziev	Canada	48.49	Q
16	9	4	Alessandro Miressi	Italy	48.51	Q
17	9	2	Hwang Sun-woo	South Korea	48.61	Q
17	10	1	Zac Incerti	Australia	48.61	
19	11	3	Rafael Miroslaw	Germany	48.65	
20	9	6	Roman Mityukov	Switzerland	48.77	
21	6	5	Jordan Crooks	Cayman Islands	48.79	
21	8	9	Carter Swift	New Zealand	48.79	NR
23	11	2	Katsuhiro Matsumoto	Japan	48.83	
24	9	8	William Yang	Australia	48.87	
25	9	7	Gabriel Santos	Brazil	48.89	
26	9	0	Marcelo Chierighini	Brazil	48.97	
27	9	1	Hadrien Salvan	France	49.01	
28	11	8	Stan Pijnenburg	Netherlands	49.11	
29	11	9	Heiko Gigler	Austria	49.29	
30	8	2	Tomer Frankel	Israel	49.34	
31	7	4	Aleksey Tarasenko	Uzbekistan	49.35	NR
32	8	4	Sergio de Celis	Spain	49.46	
33	8	6	Odysseus Meladinis	Greece	49.50	
34	8	0	Daniel Zaitsev	Estonia	49.56	
35	8	1	Alberto Mestre	Venezuela	49.59	
36	8	5	Jorge Iga	Mexico	49.70	
37	7	6	Nicholas Lia	Norway	49.83	
38	10	8	Yang Jintong	China	49.92	
39	7	7	Tomas Navikonis	Lithuania	49.93	
40	7	8	Nikolas Antoniou	Cyprus	49.97	NR
41	7	5	Ralph Daleiden	Luxembourg	50.01	
41	9	9	Jonathan Tan	Singapore	50.01	
43	10	9	Robin Hanson	Sweden	50.06	
44	7	2	Guido Buscaglia	Argentina	50.19	
45	11	7	Sergii Shevtsov	Ukraine	50.28	
46	6	6	Deniel Nankov	Bulgaria	50.30	
47	6	2	Lamar Taylor	Bahamas	50.36	NR
47	7	1	Matej Duša	Slovakia	50.36	
49	7	9	Samy Boutouil	Morocco	50.38	
50	6	3	Hoàng Quý Phước	Vietnam	50.43	
50	6	4	Wesley Roberts	Cook Islands	50.43	
50	7	3	Artur Barseghyan	Armenia	50.43	
53	7	0	Ben Hockin	Paraguay	50.48	
54	6	9	Waleed Abdulrazzaq	Kuwait	50.67	
55	6	1	Clayton Jimmie	South Africa	50.68	
56	6	8	Dulyawat Kaewsriyong	Thailand	51.29	
57	5	6	Luka Kukhalashvili	Georgia	51.49	
58	4	5	Colins Ebingha	Nigeria	51.53	
59	5	3	Yousuf Al-Matrooshi	United Arab Emirates	51.58	
60	5	8	Pedro Chiancone	Uruguay	51.61	
61	5	1	Jayhan Odlum-Smith	Saint Lucia	51.87	
62	4	4	Jesse Washington	Bermuda	51.94	
63	5	9	Omar Abbass	Syria	51.99	
64	6	0	Stefano Mitchell	Antigua and Barbuda	52.02	
65	4	3	Tomás Lomero	Andorra	52.16	
66	5	4	Alaa Masoo	FINA Refugee Team	52.45	
67	5	5	Matin Sohran	Iran	52.52	
68	4	6	Bartal Eidesgaard	Faroe Islands	52.58	
69	5	0	Steven Aimable	Senegal	52.80	
70	1	2	Batbayaryn Enkhtamir	Mongolia	52.95	
71	4	0	Henrique Mascarenhas	Angola	53.28	
72	3	5	Yazan Al-Bawwab	Palestine	53.46	
73	5	2	Gregory Anodin	Mauritius	53.68	
74	4	2	Ado Gargović	Montenegro	53.82	
75	4	1	Belly-Cresus Ganira	Burundi	53.85	
76	4	8	Collins Saliboko	Tanzania	53.90	
77	2	9	Irvin Hoost	Suriname	53.95	
78	4	9	Swaleh Talib	Suspended Member Federation	54.02	
79	1	3	Mathieu Bachmann	Seychelles	54.08	
80	6	7	Alexander Varakin	Kazakhstan	54.19	
81	1	6	Christian Nikles	Brunei	54.71	
82	4	7	Alassane Seydou	Niger	54.73	NR
83	3	2	Marc Dansou	Benin	54.87	
84	3	6	Finau Ohuafi	Tonga	54.95	
85	3	4	Leon Seaton	Guyana	55.09	
86	3	3	Shane Cadogan	Saint Vincent and the Grenadines	55.10	
87	2	3	Eminguly Ballykov	Turkmenistan	55.99	
88	3	7	Martin Muja	Kosovo	56.57	
89	1	5	Jenebi Benoit	Grenada	57.03	
90	3	8	Eloi Maniraguha	Rwanda	57.17	
91	3	0	Sangay Tenzin	Bhutan	57.69	
92	2	1	Benjamin Ko	Guam	57.70	
93	2	8	Travis Sakurai	Palau	59.63	
94	2	0	Kyler Kihleng	Micronesia	1:00.72	
95	3	9	Edgar Iro	Solomon Islands	1:00.73	
96	2	4	Asher Banda	Malawi	1:03.72	
96	2	6	Phillip Kinono	Marshall Islands	1:03.72	
98	2	7	Diosdado Miko Eyanga	Equatorial Guinea	1:10.26	
99	2	5	Asdad Fenelus	Haiti	1:17.87	
	1	4	Freddy Mayala	Republic of the Congo	Did not start	
	2	2	Ahmed Al-Hasani	Iraq	Did not start	
	3	1	Adnan Kabuye	Uganda	Did not start	
	5	7	Kledi Kadiu	Albania	Did not start	
	8	7	Mohamed El-Sayed	Egypt	Did not start	
	8	8	Ian Ho	Hong Kong	Did not start	

=== Semifinals ===
The semifinals were started on 21 June at 18:26.

Rank	Heat	Lane	Name	Nationality	Time	Notes
1	2	4	David Popovici	Romania	47.13	Q, WJ, NR
2	1	5	Maxime Grousset	France	47.54	Q
3	2	5	Joshua Liendo	Canada	47.55	Q
4	2	1	Lewis Burras	Great Britain	47.63	Q, NR
5	2	3	Pan Zhanle	China	47.65	Q, =NR
6	2	8	Alessandro Miressi	Italy	47.89	Q
7	2	2	Brooks Curry	United States	47.90	Q
8	1	6	Nándor Németh	Hungary	47.96	QSO
8	2	6	Lorenzo Zazzeri	Italy	47.96	QSO
10	1	4	Andrej Barna	Serbia	47.97	
11	1	8	Hwang Sun-woo	South Korea	48.08	
12	1	7	Szebasztián Szabó	Hungary	48.19	
12	1	3	Jacob Whittle	Great Britain	48.19	
14	2	7	Dylan Carter	Trinidad and Tobago	48.30	NR
15	1	2	Mikel Schreuders	Aruba	48.73	
16	1	1	Ruslan Gaziev	Canada	49.00	

==== Swim-off ====
The swim-off was held on 21 June at 20:20.

Rank	Lane	Name	Nationality	Time	Notes
1	4	Nándor Németh	Hungary	47.69	Q
2	5	Lorenzo Zazzeri	Italy	48.04	

=== Final ===
The final was held on 22 June at 18:22.

Rank	Lane	Name	Nationality	Time	Notes
1st place, gold medalist(s)	4	David Popovici	Romania	47.58	
2nd place, silver medalist(s)	5	Maxime Grousset	France	47.64	
3rd place, bronze medalist(s)	3	Joshua Liendo	Canada	47.71	
4	2	Pan Zhanle	China	47.79	
5	1	Brooks Curry	United States	48.00	
6	8	Nándor Németh	Hungary	48.13	
7	6	Lewis Burras	Great Britain	48.23	
8	7	Alessandro Miressi	Italy	48.31	
