= Swimming at the 2022 World Aquatics Championships – Women's 50 metre butterfly =

Women's 50 metre butterfly at the 2022 World Aquatics Championships
- Venue: Danube Arena
- Location: Budapest, Hungary
- Dates: 23 June (heats and semifinals); 24 June (final)
- Competitors: 60 from 54 nations
- Winning time: 24.95

Medalists
gold medal	Sarah Sjöström	Sweden
silver medal	Mélanie Henique	France
bronze medal	Zhang Yufei	China

The Women's 50 metre butterfly competition at the 2022 World Aquatics Championships was held on 23 and 24 June 2022.

== Records ==
Prior to the competition, the existing world and championship records were as follows.

World record	Sarah Sjöström (SWE)	24.43	Borås, Sweden	5 July 2014
Competition record	Sarah Sjöström (SWE)	24.60	Budapest, Hungary	29 July 2017

== Results ==
=== Heats ===
The heats were started on 23 June at 09:56.

Rank	Heat	Lane	Name	Nationality	Time	Notes
1	6	3	Zhang Yufei	China	25.39	Q
2	7	4	Sarah Sjöström	Sweden	25.43	Q
3	6	4	Mélanie Henique	France	25.61	Q
4	7	6	Maaike de Waard	Netherlands	25.92	Q
5	5	4	Claire Curzan	United States	25.93	Q
6	6	6	Sara Junevik	Sweden	25.94	Q
7	5	3	Farida Osman	Egypt	25.95	Q
8	6	5	Marie Wattel	France	26.01	Q
9	7	2	Silvia Di Pietro	Italy	26.08	Q
10	7	3	Torri Huske	United States	26.10	Q
11	5	5	Anna Ntountounaki	Greece	26.20	Q
12	7	7	Brianna Throssell	Australia	26.26	Q
13	5	7	Jeong So-eun	South Korea	26.40	Q
14	6	2	Julie Kepp Jensen	Denmark	26.45	Q
15	5	2	Elena Di Liddo	Italy	26.47	Q
15	7	0	Katerine Savard	Canada	26.47	Q
17	7	1	Neža Klančar	Slovenia	26.56	
18	4	4	Maria Ugolkova	Switzerland	26.58	
19	5	6	Tessa Giele	Netherlands	26.63	
20	7	9	Helena Gasson	New Zealand	26.67	
21	7	5	Emilie Beckmann	Denmark	26.69	
22	5	1	Giovanna Diamante	Brazil	26.75	
23	4	5	Tamara Potocká	Slovakia	26.82	
24	6	0	Dominika Varga	Hungary	26.91	
25	4	3	Lismar Lyon	Venezuela	26.93	
26	6	9	Quah Jing Wen	Singapore	26.95	
27	7	8	Mimosa Jallow	Finland	26.99	
28	5	8	Anicka Delgado	Ecuador	27.12	
29	6	7	Lana Pudar	Bosnia and Herzegovina	27.14	
30	5	0	Huang Mei-chien	Chinese Taipei	27.20	
31	6	1	Jenjira Srisaard	Thailand	27.21	
32	5	9	Miranda Renner	Philippines	27.22	
33	4	6	Mariam Sheikhalizadeh	Azerbaijan	27.29	
34	6	8	Gabriela Ņikitina	Latvia	27.41	
35	4	8	Olivia Borg	Samoa	27.43	
36	4	2	Maddy Moore	Bermuda	27.48	
37	4	0	Amel Melih	Algeria	27.59	
38	4	9	Nikol Merizaj	Albania	27.83	
39	4	1	Oumy Diop	Senegal	27.89	
40	3	4	Imane El Barodi	Morocco	27.96	NR
41	3	6	María Schutzmeier	Nicaragua	28.33	
42	3	5	Norah Milanesi	Cameroon	28.66	
43	1	4	Varsenik Manucharyan	Armenia	28.80	
44	2	5	Mikaili Charlemagne	Saint Lucia	29.00	
45	2	8	Batbayaryn Enkhkhüslen	Mongolia	29.08	
46	3	7	Cherelle Thompson	Trinidad and Tobago	29.29	
47	3	3	Lia Lima	Angola	29.31	
48	3	1	Aniqah Gaffoor	Sri Lanka	29.79	
49	3	2	Antsa Rabejaona	Madagascar	29.87	
50	3	0	Yusra Mardini	FINA Refugee Team	30.08	
51	1	5	Anastasiya Morginshtern	Turkmenistan	30.59	
52	2	1	Ayah Binrajab	Bahrain	30.69	NR
53	3	8	Hayley Hoy	Eswatini	30.99	
54	3	9	Denise Donelli	Mozambique	31.01	
55	2	7	Taffi Illis	Sint Maarten	31.25	
56	2	4	Tilka Paljk	Zambia	31.48	
57	2	0	Kestra Kihleng	Micronesia	31.76	
58	1	3	Sonia Aktar	Bangladesh	32.26	
59	2	6	Daniella Nafal	Palestine	33.25	
60	2	2	Kayla Hepler	Marshall Islands	34.94	
	2	2	Lucie Kouadio	Ivory Coast	Did not start	
	3	2	Luana Alonso	Paraguay	Did not start	

=== Semifinals ===
The semifinals were started on 23 June at 19:11.

Rank	Heat	Lane	Name	Nationality	Time	Notes
1	1	4	Sarah Sjöström	Sweden	25.13	Q
2	1	2	Torri Huske	United States	25.38	Q, AM
3	2	5	Mélanie Henique	France	25.41	Q
4	2	6	Farida Osman	Egypt	25.46	Q
5	2	4	Zhang Yufei	China	25.54	Q
6	1	6	Marie Wattel	France	25.56	Q
7	2	3	Claire Curzan	United States	25.67	Q
8	1	5	Maaike de Waard	Netherlands	25.75	Q
9	1	3	Sara Junevik	Sweden	25.80	
10	2	7	Anna Ntountounaki	Greece	25.89	
11	1	7	Brianna Throssell	Australia	26.05	
12	2	2	Silvia Di Pietro	Italy	26.08	
13	1	8	Katerine Savard	Canada	26.14	
14	1	1	Julie Kepp Jensen	Denmark	26.32	
14	2	1	Jeong So-eun	South Korea	26.32	
16	2	8	Elena Di Liddo	Italy	26.59	

=== Final ===
The final was held on 24 June at 18:02.

Rank	Lane	Name	Nationality	Time	Notes
1st place, gold medalist(s)	4	Sarah Sjöström	Sweden	24.95	
2nd place, silver medalist(s)	3	Mélanie Henique	France	25.31	
3rd place, bronze medalist(s)	2	Zhang Yufei	China	25.32	
4	6	Farida Osman	Egypt	25.38	AF
5	1	Claire Curzan	United States	25.43	
6	5	Torri Huske	United States	25.45	
7	7	Marie Wattel	France	25.79	
8	8	Maaike de Waard	Netherlands	25.85	
