= Swimming at the 2022 World Aquatics Championships =

- Host city: Budapest, Hungary
- Date: 18–25 June
- Venue: Danube Arena
- Events: 42

Swimming at the 2022 World Aquatics Championships took place from 18 to 25 June 2022. The United States won the most gold medals (17) and overall medal count (45) in this discipline. Katie Ledecky of the United States and Léon Marchand of France earned FINA Swimmer of the Meet honors based on a scoring system that awards points for top-four finishes. The United States won the best team award for winning 45 medals.

== Schedule ==
42 events were held.

All times were local (UTC+2).

H	Heats	½	Semi finals	F	Final

M = Morning session (starting at 09:00), E = Evening session (starting at 18:00)

Men
Date →	Sat 18		Sun 19		Mon 20		Tue 21		Wed 22		Thu 23		Fri 24		Sat 25	
Event ↓	M	E	M	E	M	E	M	E	M	E	M	E	M	E	M	E
50 m freestyle											H	½		F		
100 m freestyle							H	½		F						
200 m freestyle			H	½		F										
400 m freestyle	H	F														
800 m freestyle					H			F								
1500 m freestyle													H			F
50 m backstroke													H	½		F
100 m backstroke			H	½		F										
200 m backstroke									H	½		F				
50 m breaststroke					H	½		F								
100 m breaststroke	H	½		F												
200 m breaststroke									H	½		F				
50 m butterfly	H	½		F												
100 m butterfly											H	½		F		
200 m butterfly					H	½		F								
200 m individual medley							H	½		F						
400 m individual medley	H	F														
4 × 100 m freestyle relay	H	F														
4 × 200 m freestyle relay											H	F				
4 × 100 m medley relay															H	F

Women
Date →	Sat 18		Sun 19		Mon 20		Tue 21		Wed 22		Thu 23		Fri 24		Sat 25	
Event ↓	M	E	M	E	M	E	M	E	M	E	M	E	M	E	M	E
50 m freestyle													H	½		F
100 m freestyle									H	½		F				
200 m freestyle					H	½		F								
400 m freestyle	H	F														
800 m freestyle											H			F		
1500 m freestyle			H			F										
50 m backstroke							H	½		F						
100 m backstroke			H	½		F										
200 m backstroke											H	½		F		
50 m breaststroke													H	½		F
100 m breaststroke			H	½		F										
200 m breaststroke									H	½		F				
50 m butterfly											H	½		F		
100 m butterfly	H	½		F												
200 m butterfly							H	½		F						
200 m individual medley	H	½		F												
400 m individual medley															H	F
4 × 100 m freestyle relay	H	F														
4 × 200 m freestyle relay									H	F						
4 × 100 m medley relay															H	F

Mixed
Date →	Sat 18		Sun 19		Mon 20		Tue 21		Wed 22		Thu 23		Fri 24		Sat 25	
Event ↓	M	E	M	E	M	E	M	E	M	E	M	E	M	E	M	E
4 × 100 m freestyle relay													H	F		
4 × 100 m medley relay							H	F								

== Medal summary ==
=== Medal table ===
* Host nation (Hungary)

Rank	Nation	Gold	Silver	Bronze	Total
1	United States	17	12	16	45
2	Australia	6	9	2	17
3	Italy	5	2	2	9
4	Canada	3	4	4	11
5	France	2	4	2	8
6	Sweden	2	2	0	4
7	Hungary*	2	0	0	2
7	Romania	2	0	0	2
9	Great Britain	1	1	3	5
10	China	1	0	4	5
11	Lithuania	1	0	1	2
12	Germany	0	3	1	4
13	Japan	0	2	2	4
14	Brazil	0	1	1	2
14	Netherlands	0	1	1	2
14	Poland	0	1	1	2
17	South Korea	0	1	0	1
18	South Africa	0	0	1	1
18	Ukraine	0	0	1	1
Totals (19 entries)		42	43	42	127

=== Men ===
Event	Gold		Silver		Bronze	
50 m freestyle	Ben Proud; Great Britain	21.32	Michael Andrew; United States	21.41	Maxime Grousset; France	21.57
100 m freestyle	David Popovici; Romania	47.58	Maxime Grousset; France	47.64	Joshua Liendo; Canada	47.71
200 m freestyle	David Popovici; Romania	1:43.21; WJ, NR	Hwang Sun-woo; South Korea	1:44.47; NR	Tom Dean; Great Britain	1:44.98
400 m freestyle	Elijah Winnington; Australia	3:41.22	Lukas Märtens; Germany	3:42.85	Guilherme Costa; Brazil	3:43.31; SA
800 m freestyle	Bobby Finke; United States	7:39.36; AM	Florian Wellbrock; Germany	7:39.63; NR	Mykhailo Romanchuk; Ukraine	7:40.05; NR
1500 m freestyle	Gregorio Paltrinieri; Italy	14:32.80; CR, ER	Bobby Finke; United States	14:36.70; AM	Florian Wellbrock; Germany	14:36.94
50 m backstroke	Justin Ress; United States	24.12	Hunter Armstrong; United States	24.14	Ksawery Masiuk; Poland	24.49
100 m backstroke	Thomas Ceccon; Italy	51.60; WR	Ryan Murphy; United States	51.97	Hunter Armstrong; United States	51.98
200 m backstroke	Ryan Murphy; United States	1:54.52	Luke Greenbank; Great Britain	1:55.16	Shaine Casas; United States	1:55.35
50 m breaststroke	Nic Fink; United States	26.45; NR	Nicolò Martinenghi; Italy	26.48	Michael Andrew; United States	26.72
100 m breaststroke	Nicolò Martinenghi; Italy	58.26; NR	Arno Kamminga; Netherlands	58.62	Nic Fink; United States	58.65
200 m breaststroke	Zac Stubblety-Cook; Australia	2:07.07	Yu Hanaguruma; Japan Erik Persson; Sweden	2:08.38	None awarded	
50 m butterfly	Caeleb Dressel; United States	22.57	Nicholas Santos; Brazil	22.78	Michael Andrew; United States	22.79
100 m butterfly	Kristóf Milák; Hungary	50.14	Naoki Mizunuma; Japan	50.94	Joshua Liendo; Canada	50.97
200 m butterfly	Kristóf Milák; Hungary	1:50.34; WR	Léon Marchand; France	1:53.37; NR	Tomoru Honda; Japan	1:53.61
200 m individual medley	Léon Marchand; France	1:55.22; NR	Carson Foster; United States	1:55.71	Daiya Seto; Japan	1:56.22
400 m individual medley	Léon Marchand; France	4:04.28; CR, ER	Carson Foster; United States	4:06.56	Chase Kalisz; United States	4:07.47
4 × 100 m freestyle relay	United States; Caeleb Dressel (47.67); Ryan Held (46.99); Justin Ress (47.48); Brooks Curry (47.20); Hunter Armstrong^{[a]}	3:09.34	Australia; William Yang (48.41); Matthew Temple (48.17); Jack Cartwright (47.62); Kyle Chalmers (46.60)	3:10.80	Italy; Alessandro Miressi (48.38); Thomas Ceccon (47.57); Lorenzo Zazzeri (47.35); Manuel Frigo (47.65)	3:10.95
4 × 200 m freestyle relay	United States; Drew Kibler (1:45.54); Carson Foster (1:45.04); Trenton Julian (1:45.31); Kieran Smith (1:44.35); Trey Freeman^{[a]} Coby Carrozza^{[a]}	7:00.24	Australia; Elijah Winnington (1:45.83); Zac Incerti (1:45.51); Samuel Short (1:46.44); Mack Horton (1:45.72); Brendon Smith^{[a]}	7:03.50	Great Britain; James Guy (1:46.31); Jacob Whittle (1:46.80); Joe Litchfield (1:47.36); Tom Dean (1:43.53); Matthew Richards^{[a]}	7:04.00
4 × 100 m medley relay	Italy; Thomas Ceccon (51.93); Nicolò Martinenghi (57.47); Federico Burdisso (50.63); Alessandro Miressi (47.48); Piero Codia^{[a]} Lorenzo Zazzeri^{[a]}	3:27.51 =ER	United States; Ryan Murphy (52.51); Nic Fink (57.86); Michael Andrew (50.06); Ryan Held (47.36); Hunter Armstrong^{[a]} Trenton Julian^{[a]} Brooks Curry^{[a]}	3:27.79	Great Britain; Luke Greenbank (53.81); James Wilby (58.82); James Guy (51.23); Tom Dean (47.45); Jacob Peters^{[a]} Lewis Burras^{[a]}	3:31.31
AF African record | AM Americas record | AS Asian record | CR Championship record | ER European record | OC Oceania record | WR World record | NR National record

^{a} Swimmers who participated in the heats only and received medals.

=== Women ===
Event	Gold		Silver		Bronze	
50 m freestyle	Sarah Sjöström; Sweden	23.98	Katarzyna Wasick; Poland	24.18	Meg Harris; Australia Erika Brown; United States	24.38
100 m freestyle	Mollie O'Callaghan; Australia	52.67	Sarah Sjöström; Sweden	52.80	Torri Huske; United States	52.92
200 m freestyle	Yang Junxuan; China	1:54.92	Mollie O'Callaghan; Australia	1:55.22	Tang Muhan; China	1:56.25
400 m freestyle	Katie Ledecky; United States	3:58.15; CR	Summer McIntosh; Canada	3:59.39; NR	Leah Smith; United States	4:02.08
800 m freestyle	Katie Ledecky; United States	8:08.04	Kiah Melverton; Australia	8:18.77	Simona Quadarella; Italy	8:19.00
1500 m freestyle	Katie Ledecky; United States	15:30.15	Katie Grimes; United States	15:44.89	Lani Pallister; Australia	15:48.96
50 m backstroke	Kylie Masse; Canada	27.31	Katharine Berkoff; United States	27.39	Analia Pigrée; France	27.40
100 m backstroke	Regan Smith; United States	58.22	Kylie Masse; Canada	58.40	Claire Curzan; United States	58.67
200 m backstroke	Kaylee McKeown; Australia	2:05.08	Phoebe Bacon; United States	2:05.12	Rhyan White; United States	2:06.96
50 m breaststroke	Rūta Meilutytė; Lithuania	29.70	Benedetta Pilato; Italy	29.80	Lara van Niekerk; South Africa	29.90
100 m breaststroke	Benedetta Pilato; Italy	1:05.93	Anna Elendt; Germany	1:05.98	Rūta Meilutytė; Lithuania	1:06.02
200 m breaststroke	Lilly King; United States	2:22.41	Jenna Strauch; Australia	2:23.04	Kate Douglass; United States	2:23.20
50 m butterfly	Sarah Sjöström; Sweden	24.95	Mélanie Henique; France	25.31	Zhang Yufei; China	25.32
100 m butterfly	Torri Huske; United States	55.64; NR	Marie Wattel; France	56.14; NR	Zhang Yufei; China	56.41
200 m butterfly	Summer McIntosh; Canada	2:05.20; WJ, NR	Hali Flickinger; United States	2:06.08	Zhang Yufei; China	2:06.32
200 m individual medley	Alexandra Walsh; United States	2:07.13	Kaylee McKeown; Australia	2:08.57	Leah Hayes; United States	2:08.91; WJ
400 m individual medley	Summer McIntosh; Canada	4:32.04; WJ	Katie Grimes; United States	4:32.67	Emma Weyant; United States	4:36.00
4 × 100 m freestyle relay	Australia; Mollie O'Callaghan (52.70); Madison Wilson (52.60); Meg Harris (53.00); Shayna Jack (52.65); Leah Neale^{[b]} Brianna Throssell^{[b]}	3:30.95	Canada; Kayla Sanchez (53.45); Taylor Ruck (52.92); Maggie Mac Neil (53.27); Penny Oleksiak (52.51); Rebecca Smith^{[b]} Katerine Savard^{[b]}	3:32.15	United States; Torri Huske (52.96); Erika Brown (53.30); Kate Douglass (53.61); Claire Curzan (52.71); Mallory Comerford^{[b]} Natalie Hinds^{[b]}	3:32.58
4 × 200 m freestyle relay	United States; Claire Weinstein (1:56.71); Leah Smith (1:56.47); Katie Ledecky (1:53.67); Bella Sims (1:54.60); Alexandra Walsh^{[b]} Hali Flickinger^{[b]}	7:41.45; CR	Australia; Madison Wilson (1:56.74); Leah Neale (1:55.27); Kiah Melverton (1:55.91); Mollie O'Callaghan (1:55.94); Lani Pallister^{[b]} Brianna Throssell^{[b]}	7:43.86	Canada; Summer McIntosh (1:54.79) WJ; Kayla Sanchez (1:57.39); Taylor Ruck (1:56.75); Penny Oleksiak (1:55.83); Mary-Sophie Harvey^{[b]} Katerine Savard^{[b]} Rebecca Smith^{[b]}	7:44.76
4 × 100 m medley relay	United States; Regan Smith (58.40); Lilly King (1:05.89); Torri Huske (56.67); Claire Curzan (52.82); Rhyan White^{[b]} Alexandra Walsh^{[b]} Natalie Hinds^{[b]} Erika Brown^{[b]}	3:53.78	Australia; Kaylee McKeown (58.77); Jenna Strauch (1:05.99); Brianna Throssell (57.19); Mollie O'Callaghan (52.30); Madison Wilson^{[b]}	3:54.25	Canada; Kylie Masse (58.39); Rachel Nicol (1:07.17); Maggie Mac Neil (56.80); Penny Oleksiak (52.65); Ingrid Wilm^{[b]} Kelsey Wog^{[b]} Kayla Sanchez^{[b]}	3:55.01
AF African record | AM Americas record | AS Asian record | CR Championship record | ER European record | OC Oceania record | WR World record | NR National record

^{b} Swimmers who participated in the heats only and received medals.

=== Mixed ===
Event	Gold		Silver		Bronze	
4 × 100 m freestyle relay	Australia; Jack Cartwright (48.12); Kyle Chalmers (46.98); Madison Wilson (52.25); Mollie O'Callaghan (52.03); Zac Incerti^{[c]} William Yang^{[c]} Meg Harris^{[c]} Leah Neale^{[c]}	3:19.38; WR	Canada; Joshua Liendo (48.02); Javier Acevedo (47.96); Kayla Sanchez (52.52); Penny Oleksiak (52.11); Ruslan Gaziev^{[c]} Taylor Ruck^{[c]} Maggie Mac Neil^{[c]}	3:20.61; NR	United States; Ryan Held (47.93); Brooks Curry (47.72); Torri Huske (52.70); Claire Curzan (52.84); Drew Kibler^{[c]} Erika Brown^{[c]} Kate Douglass^{[c]}	3:21.09
4 × 100 m medley relay	United States; Hunter Armstrong (52.14); Nic Fink (57.86); Torri Huske (56.17); Claire Curzan (52.62); Ryan Murphy^{[c]} Lilly King^{[c]} Michael Andrew^{[c]} Erika Brown^{[c]}	3:38.79	Australia; Kaylee McKeown (58.66); Zac Stubblety-Cook (58.92); Matthew Temple (50.84); Shayna Jack (52.92); Isaac Cooper^{[c]} Matthew Wilson^{[c]} Brianna Throssell^{[c]} Meg Harris^{[c]}	3:41.34	Netherlands; Kira Toussaint (59.72); Arno Kamminga (58.28); Nyls Korstanje (50.99); Marrit Steenbergen (52.55)	3:41.54
AF African record | AM Americas record | AS Asian record | CR Championship record | ER European record | OC Oceania record | WR World record | NR National record

^{c} Swimmers who participated in the heats only and received medals.

== Records ==
The following world and championship records were broken during the competition.

=== World records ===
Date	Event	Time	Name	Nation
June 20	Men's 100 m backstroke final	51.60	Thomas Ceccon	Italy
June 21	Men's 200 m butterfly final	1:50.34	Kristóf Milák	Hungary
June 24	4 × 100 m mixed freestyle relay final	3:19.38	Jack Cartwright (48.12); Kyle Chalmers (46.98); Madison Wilson (52.25); Mollie O'Callaghan (52.03)	Australia

=== Championship records ===
Date	Event	Time	Name	Nation
June 18	Women's 400 m freestyle final	3:58.15	Katie Ledecky	United States
June 22	Women's 4 × 200 m freestyle relay final	7:41.45	Claire Weinstein (1:56.71); Leah Smith (1:56.47); Katie Ledecky (1:53.67); Bella Sims (1:54.60)	United States
