= Ákos Kalmár =

Hungarian swimmer (born 2000)

Personal information
- National team: Hungary
- Born: 11 January 2000 (age 26) Baja, Hungary

Sport
- Sport: Swimming
- Strokes: Freestyle
Medal record
Men's swimming
Representing Hungary
World Junior Championships
Gold medal – first place	2017 Indianapolis	4×200 m freestyle
European Junior Championships
Gold medal – first place	2017 Netanya	400 m freestyle
Gold medal – first place	2018 Helsinki	800 m freestyle
Gold medal – first place	2018 Helsinki	1500 m freestyle
Silver medal – second place	2017 Netanya	800 m freestyle
Silver medal – second place	2017 Netanya	1500 m freestyle

Ákos Kalmár (born 11 January 2000) is a Hungarian swimmer.

In 2018, he represented Hungary at the 2018 Summer Youth Olympics held in Buenos Aires, Argentina.

In 2019, he represented Hungary at the 2019 World Aquatics Championships held in Gwangju, South Korea. He competed in the men's 800 metre freestyle and men's 1500 metre freestyle events. He also competed in the men's 4 × 200 metre freestyle relay event.
