= Open water swimming at the 2022 World Aquatics Championships =

- Host city: Budapest, Hungary
- Date(s): 26–30 June
- Venue(s): Lupa Beach
- Events: 7

Open water swimming at the 2022 World Aquatics Championships was held from 26 to 30 June 2022.

== Schedule ==
Seven events were held.

All times are local (UTC+2).

Date	Time	Event
26 June 2022	13:00	6 km team
27 June 2022	09:00	Men's 5 km
27 June 2022	12:00	Women's 5 km
29 June 2022	08:00	Women's 10 km
29 June 2022	12:00	Men's 10 km
30 June 2022	07:00	Men's 25 km
30 June 2022	07:00	Women's 25 km

== Medal summary ==
=== Medal table ===
* Host nation (Hungary)

Rank	Nation	Gold	Silver	Bronze	Total
1	Italy	2	2	2	6
2	Germany	2	2	1	5
3	Brazil	2	0	1	3
4	Netherlands	1	0	1	2
5	France	0	2	0	2
6	Hungary*	0	1	1	2
7	Ukraine	0	0	1	1
Totals (7 entries)		7	7	7	21

=== Men ===
Event	Gold		Silver		Bronze	
5 km	Florian Wellbrock; Germany	52:48.8	Gregorio Paltrinieri; Italy	52:52.7	Mykhailo Romanchuk; Ukraine	53:13.9
10 km	Gregorio Paltrinieri; Italy	1:50:56.8	Domenico Acerenza; Italy	1:50:58.2	Florian Wellbrock; Germany	1:51:11.2
25 km	Dario Verani; Italy	5:02:21.5	Axel Reymond; France	5:02:22.7	Péter Gálicz; Hungary	5:02:35.4

=== Women ===
Event	Gold		Silver		Bronze	
5 km	Ana Marcela Cunha; Brazil	57:52.9	Aurélie Muller; France	57:53.8	Giulia Gabbrielleschi; Italy	57:54.9
10 km	Sharon van Rouwendaal; Netherlands	2:02:29.2	Leonie Beck; Germany	2:02:29.7	Ana Marcela Cunha; Brazil	2:02:30.7
25 km	Ana Marcela Cunha; Brazil	5:24:15.0	Lea Boy; Germany	5:24:15.2	Sharon van Rouwendaal; Netherlands	5:24:15.3

=== Team ===
Event	Gold		Silver		Bronze	
Team	Germany; Lea Boy; Oliver Klemet; Leonie Beck; Florian Wellbrock	1:04:40.5	Hungary; Réka Rohács; Anna Olasz; Dávid Betlehem; Kristóf Rasovszky	1:04:43.0	Italy; Ginevra Taddeucci; Giulia Gabbrielleschi; Domenico Acerenza; Gregorio Paltrinieri	1:04:43.0
