= Diving at the 2022 Commonwealth Games =

- Venue: Sandwell Aquatics Centre
- Dates: 4–8 August 2022
- Competitors: 75 from 10 nations

Diving at the 2022 Commonwealth Games was the 22nd appearance of Diving at the Commonwealth Games. The diving events at the 2022 Commonwealth Games, were held in Birmingham, England. The sport has been staged in all twenty-one previous editions of the Games thus far, and will be contested in England for the third time.

The competition is scheduled to take place between 4 and 8 August 2022, spread across twelve events, two more than in Gold Coast as mixed-sex 3 metre and 10 metre synchronised events are held for the first time. All individual events shall have preliminaries and finals, while synchronised events will be a straight final.

== Schedule ==
The competition schedule is as follows:

P	Preliminary round	F	Final

Date Event	Thu 4		Fri 5		Sat 6		Sun 7		Mon 8
Session →	A	E	M	E	M	E	M	E	M
Men's 1 m springboard	P	F							
Men's 3 m springboard					P	F			
Men's 10 m platform							P	F	
Men's synchronised 3 m springboard			F						
Men's synchronised 10 m platform				F					
Women's 1 m springboard			P	F					
Women's 3 m springboard							P	F	
Women's 10 m platform	P	F							
Women's synchronised 3 m springboard					F				
Women's synchronised 10 m platform						F			
Mixed synchronised 3 m springboard									F
Mixed synchronised 10 m platform									F

== Venue ==
The diving competition will be held at the Sandwell Aquatics Centre, the only new-build permanent venue constructed for the Games. The swimming competition will also take place there.

== Medal summary ==
=== Medal table ===
* Host nation (England)

Rank	CGA	Gold	Silver	Bronze	Total
1	England*	6	4	5	15
2	Australia	4	3	3	10
3	Canada	1	2	3	6
4	Scotland	1	0	0	1
5	Malaysia	0	3	1	4
Totals (5 entries)		12	12	12	36

=== Men ===
Event	Gold		Silver		Bronze	
1 m springboard	Jack Laugher; England	447.05	Li Shixin; Australia	437.05	Jordan Houlden; England	429.30
3 m springboard	Daniel Goodfellow; England	484.45	Jordan Houlden; England	465.15	Jack Laugher; England	462.30
10 m platform	Cassiel Rousseau; Australia	501.30	Rylan Wiens; Canada	492.80	Matty Lee; England	477.00
Synchronised 3 m springboard	England; Jack Laugher; Anthony Harding	438.33	Malaysia; Muhammad Syafiq Puteh; Gabriel Gilbert Daim	376.77	Australia; Li Shixin; Sam Fricker	374.52
Synchronised 10 m platform	England; Matty Lee; Noah Williams	429.78	Canada; Rylan Wiens; Nathan Zsombor-Murray	413.85	Australia; Domonic Bedggood; Cassiel Rousseau	412.56

=== Women ===
Event	Gold		Silver		Bronze	
1 m springboard	Mia Vallée; Canada	291.85	Brittany O'Brien; Australia	279.60	Amy Rollinson; England	272.00
3 m springboard	Maddison Keeney; Australia	348.95	Nur Dhabitah Sabri; Malaysia	330.90	Mia Vallée; Canada	329.25
10 m platform	Andrea Spendolini-Sirieix; England	357.50	Lois Toulson; England	337.30	Caeli McKay; Canada	317.50
Synchronised 3 m springboard	Australia; Maddison Keeney; Anabelle Smith	316.53	Malaysia; Ng Yan Yee; Nur Dhabitah Sabri	299.85	Canada; Margo Erlam; Mia Vallée	297.00
Synchronised 10 m platform	Australia; Charli Petrov; Melissa Wu	306.00	England; Eden Cheng; Andrea Spendolini-Sirieix	298.86	England; Robyn Birch; Emily Martin	287.88

=== Mixed ===
Event	Gold		Silver		Bronze	
Synchronised 3 m springboard	Scotland; James Heatly; Grace Reid	306.00	Australia; Li Shixin; Maddison Keeney	304.02	Malaysia; Muhammad Syafiq Puteh; Nur Dhabitah Sabri	299.04
Synchronised 10 m platform	England; Noah Williams; Andrea Spendolini-Sirieix	333.06	England; Kyle Kothari; Lois Toulson	318.54	Australia; Cassiel Rousseau; Emily Boyd	309.60

== Participating nations ==
There were ten participating Commonwealth Games Associations (CGAs) in diving with a total of 75 athletes (38 men and 37 women). The number of athletes a nation entered is in parentheses beside the name of the country.

- Australia (14)
- Canada (10)
- England (18)
- Jamaica (1)
- Malaysia (12)
- Northern Ireland (1)
- New Zealand (7)
- Scotland (8)
- Sri Lanka (1)
- Wales (3)
