= Diving at the 2022 Commonwealth Games – Mixed synchronised 3 metre springboard =

Mixed synchronised 3 metre springboard at the 2022 Commonwealth Games
- Venue: Sandwell Aquatics Centre
- Date: 8 August
- Competitors: 20 from 6 nations
- Winning Score: 306.00

Medalists
gold medal	James Heatly; Grace Reid	Scotland
silver medal	Li Shixin; Maddison Keeney	Australia
bronze medal	Muhammad Syafiq Puteh; Nur Dhabitah Sabri	Malaysia

The mixed synchronised 3 metre springboard is part of the 2022 Commonwealth Games diving program. The competition will be held on 8 August 2022 at Sandwell Aquatics Centre in Birmingham, England.

This is the inaugural edition of the event. Nations can send more than one team to a synchronised event. Australia, Malaysia, Scotland and hosts England have entered two teams in this event.

== Schedule ==
All times are BST (UTC+1)

Date	Time	Round
8 August 2022	10.05	Finals

== Format ==
A single round will be held, with each team making five dives. Eleven judges score each dive: three for each diver, and five for synchronisation. Only the middle score counts for each diver, with the middle three counting for synchronisation. These five scores are averaged, multiplied by 3, and multiplied by the dive's degree of difficulty to give a total dive score. The scores for each of the five dives are then aggregated to give a final score.

== Field ==
The initial field for the event was published on 22 July 2022:

Rank	Nation	Dives					Total
Rank	Nation	1	2	3	4	5	Total
1st place, gold medalist(s)	Scotland; James Heatly; Grace Reid	49.80	50.40	62.10	69.30	74.40	306.00
2nd place, silver medalist(s)	Australia; Li Shixin; Maddison Keeney	50.40	49.80	67.50	68.82	67.50	304.02
3rd place, bronze medalist(s)	Malaysia; Muhammad Syafiq Puteh; Nur Dhabitah Sabri	48.60	48.60	68.40	63.24	70.20	299.04
4	England; Ben Cutmore; Desharne Bent-Ashmeil	49.80	45.00	67.50	72.00	63.00	297.30
5	Australia; Domonic Bedggood; Anabelle Smith	48.60	44.40	68.40	66.96	65.70	294.06
6	Canada; Bryden Hattie; Margo Erlam	48.00	44.40	63.00	69.30	63.90	288.60
7	Malaysia; Gabriel Gilbert Daim; Yan Yee Ng	42.60	33.00	67.50	66.96	63.00	273.06
8	England; Jordan Houlden; Yasmin Harper	46.20	45.00	55.80	63.00	58.59	268.59
9	New Zealand; Frazer Tavener; Maggie Squire	45.60	40.80	54.90	47.70	55.89	244.89
10	Scotland; Danny Mabbott; Ciara Kerr	42.60	36.00	42.00	53.46	38.64	212.70
