= Diving at the 2022 Asian Games – Men's 3 metre springboard =

Diving competition

Men's 3 metre springboard at the 2022 Asian Games
- Venue: Hangzhou Olympic Expo Aquatics Center
- Date: 3 October 2023
- Competitors: 18 from 11 nations

Medalists
gold medal	Wang Zongyuan	China
silver medal	Zheng Jiuyuan	China
bronze medal	Yi Jae-gyeong	South Korea

The men's 3 metre springboard competition at the 2022 Asian Games took place on 3 October 2023 at Hangzhou Olympic Expo Center.

== Schedule ==
All times are China Standard Time (UTC+08:00)

Date	Time	Event
Tuesday, 3 October 2023	13:00	Preliminary
Tuesday, 3 October 2023	19:30	Final

== Results ==
Legend

- DNS — Did not start

=== Preliminary ===
Rank	Athlete	Dive						Total
Rank	Athlete	1	2	3	4	5	6	Total
1	Wang Zongyuan (CHN)	81.60	91.00	91.65	80.50	82.80	66.50	494.05
2	Yi Jae-gyeong (KOR)	74.40	71.40	73.50	77.00	70.50	58.50	425.30
3	Zheng Jiuyuan (CHN)	80.50	58.50	64.75	66.30	57.00	93.60	420.65
4	Woo Ha-ram (KOR)	76.50	56.10	62.70	77.00	67.50	66.30	406.10
5	Vyacheslav Kachanov (UZB)	61.50	71.40	57.00	52.70	73.50	57.00	373.10
6	Syafiq Puteh (MAS)	64.50	71.30	57.80	66.00	47.25	59.50	366.35
7	Chawanwat Juntaphadawon (THA)	66.00	52.70	66.30	73.10	49.50	48.00	355.60
8	Ooi Tze Liang (MAS)	52.70	74.80	74.25	33.25	44.20	45.00	324.20
9	Yuto Araki (JPN)	67.50	48.05	40.25	52.70	45.90	68.25	322.65
10	Igor Myalin (UZB)	27.00	63.00	40.80	66.00	39.00	57.35	293.15
11	Yuen Pak Yin (HKG)	58.50	45.00	44.95	40.50	51.00	47.85	287.80
12	Avvir Tham (SGP)	63.00	63.55	39.00	30.60	26.25	64.60	287.00
13	Nazar Kozhanov (KAZ)	51.00	49.60	54.00	33.00	54.00	40.80	282.40
14	Mohammad Moghaddasi (IRI)	55.50	37.50	36.00	38.75	49.50	45.60	262.85
15	Thitiwut Phoemphun (THA)	48.00	39.60	48.05	36.00	36.00	40.50	248.15
16	Siddharth Pardeshi (IND)	32.55	33.00	30.00	44.80	49.50	46.50	236.35
17	London Singh Hemam (IND)	39.00	54.25	8.75	45.00	36.00	24.00	207.00
—	Haruki Suyama (JPN)							DNS

=== Final ===
Rank	Athlete	Dive						Total
Rank	Athlete	1	2	3	4	5	6	Total
1st place, gold medalist(s)	Wang Zongyuan (CHN)	85.00	94.50	99.45	85.75	86.40	91.20	542.30
2nd place, silver medalist(s)	Zheng Jiuyuan (CHN)	82.25	69.00	84.00	86.70	96.90	89.70	508.55
3rd place, bronze medalist(s)	Yi Jae-gyeong (KOR)	69.75	78.20	68.25	73.50	67.50	69.00	426.20
4	Woo Ha-ram (KOR)	78.20	71.40	68.40	78.75	67.50	46.80	411.05
5	Syafiq Puteh (MAS)	67.50	71.30	71.40	67.50	45.50	56.00	379.20
6	Vyacheslav Kachanov (UZB)	58.50	68.00	60.00	63.55	57.75	62.70	370.50
7	Yuto Araki (JPN)	58.50	68.20	66.50	62.90	56.10	57.75	369.95
8	Chawanwat Juntaphadawon (THA)	63.00	62.00	61.20	51.00	40.50	63.00	340.70
9	Avvir Tham (SGP)	67.50	65.10	52.50	42.50	28.00	74.80	330.40
10	Ooi Tze Liang (MAS)	74.40	64.35	40.25	44.20	32.40	45.90	301.50
11	Igor Myalin (UZB)	64.50	63.00	35.70	58.50	31.50	48.05	301.25
12	Yuen Pak Yin (HKG)	55.50	43.50	46.50	42.00	4.50	44.95	236.95
