= Diving at the 2022 World Aquatics Championships – Women's synchronized 3 metre springboard =

Women's synchronized 3 metre springboard at the 2022 World Aquatics Championships
- Venue: Danube Arena
- Location: Budapest, Hungary
- Dates: 3 July (preliminary and final)
- Competitors: 26 from 13 nations
- Teams: 13
- Winning points: 343.14

Medalists
| gold medal | Chang Yani; Chen Yiwen | China |
| silver medal | Rin Kaneto; Sayaka Mikami | Japan |
| bronze medal | Maddison Keeney; Anabelle Smith | Australia |

The Women's synchronized 3 metre springboard competition at the 2022 World Aquatics Championships was held on 3 July 2022.

== Results ==
The preliminary round was started at 11:00. The final was held at 15:00.

Green denotes finalists

| Rank | Nation | Divers | Preliminary | | Final | |
| Rank | Nation | Divers | Points | Rank | Points | Rank |
|---|---|---|---|---|---|---|
| 1st place, gold medalist(s) | China | Chang Yani; Chen Yiwen | 317.73 | 1 | 343.14 | 1 |
| 2nd place, silver medalist(s) | Japan | Rin Kaneto; Sayaka Mikami | 275.10 | 5 | 303.00 | 2 |
| 3rd place, bronze medalist(s) | Australia | Maddison Keeney; Anabelle Smith | 287.04 | 2 | 294.12 | 3 |
| 4 | Germany | Lena Hentschel; Tina Punzel | 282.87 | 3 | 282.99 | 4 |
| 5 | Canada | Margo Erlam; Mia Vallée | 282.60 | 4 | 282.90 | 5 |
| 6 | Malaysia | Ng Yan Yee; Nur Dhabitah Sabri | 272.97 | 6 | 282.45 | 6 |
| 7 | United States | Brooke Schultz; Kristen Hayden | 257.40 | 7 | 273.90 | 7 |
| 8 | Mexico | Arantxa Chávez; Abril Navarro | 237.96 | 11 | 266.16 | 8 |
| 9 | Great Britain | Desharne Bent-Ashmeil; Amy Rollinson | 247.80 | 10 | 248.40 | 9 |
| 10 | Brazil | Luana Lira; Anna Lucia Rodrigues | 248.40 | 9 | 245.94 | 10 |
| 11 | Colombia | Diana Pineda; Daniela Zapata | 249.84 | 8 | 229.80 | 11 |
| 12 | France | Jade Gillet; Naïs Gillet | 198.30 | 12 | 228.45 | 12 |
| 13 | South Africa | Grace Brammer; Kerry-Leigh Morrison | 190.20 | 13 | did not advance | |
