= Diving at the 2026 Asian Games – Men's 3 metre springboard =

Diving competition

Men's 3 metre springboard at the 2026 Asian Games
- Venue: Tokyo Aquatics Centre
- Date: 29 September 2026
- Competitors: 17 from 11 nations

Medalists
gold medal	Wang Zongyuan	China
silver medal	Zheng Jiuyuan	China
bronze medal	Sho Sakai	Japan

The men's 3 metre springboard competition at the 2026 Asian Games took place on 29 September 2026 at Tokyo Aquatics Centre.

== Schedule ==
All times are Japan Standard Time (UTC+09:00)

Date	Time	Event
Tuesday, 29 September 2026	12:00	Preliminary
Tuesday, 29 September 2026	17:30	Final

== Results ==
=== Preliminary ===
Rank	Athlete	Dive						Total
Rank	Athlete	1	2	3	4	5	6	Total
1	Wang Zongyuan (CHN)	81.60	89.25	83.85	84.00	66.60	93.10	498.40
2	Zheng Jiuyuan (CHN)	61.20	84.00	78.75	41.40	77.90	93.60	436.85
3	Kim Yeong-taek (KOR)	54.00	65.10	66.30	64.50	64.75	66.50	381.15
4	Shin Jung-whi (KOR)	63.00	63.55	66.30	61.25	61.25	58.50	373.85
5	Vyacheslav Kachanov (UZB)	66.30	62.90	55.80	60.45	57.75	62.70	365.90
6	Sho Sakai (JPN)	63.00	51.00	64.60	58.50	60.45	56.00	353.55
7	Max Lee (SGP)	67.50	65.10	52.70	58.50	61.50	45.90	351.20
8	Senri Ikuma (JPN)	63.00	61.20	40.25	55.10	70.00	54.00	343.55
9	Sam Vajir (IRI)	62.90	58.50	51.00	57.75	60.45	52.70	343.30
10	Syafiq Puteh (MAS)	64.50	51.15	66.30	61.50	42.00	40.50	325.95
11	Yong Rui Jie (MAS)	62.00	51.15	49.50	58.50	28.00	45.90	295.05
12	Nazar Kozhanov (KAZ)	40.50	40.80	40.25	57.80	49.60	39.90	268.85
13	Thitipoom Marksin (THA)	49.50	46.50	56.10	36.75	54.25	21.60	264.70
14	Yuen Pak Yin (HKG)	42.00	46.50	42.00	43.50	27.00	52.50	253.50
15	Dulanjan Fernando (SRI)	45.00	46.50	49.50	43.50	40.50	15.30	240.30
16	Mohammad Moghaddasi (IRI)	49.50	41.85	36.00	40.50	36.00	35.00	238.85
17	Kirill Novikov (KAZ)	40.80	40.50	36.00	42.00	33.00	46.50	238.80

=== Final ===
Rank	Athlete	Dive						Total
Rank	Athlete	1	2	3	4	5	6	Total
1st place, gold medalist(s)	Wang Zongyuan (CHN)	86.70	89.25	85.80	78.75	68.40	85.50	494.40
2nd place, silver medalist(s)	Zheng Jiuyuan (CHN)	39.10	84.00	85.75	43.20	74.10	93.60	419.75
3rd place, bronze medalist(s)	Sho Sakai (JPN)	61.50	63.00	59.50	64.50	66.65	61.25	376.40
4	Kim Yeong-taek (KOR)	63.00	60.45	64.60	54.00	57.75	73.50	373.30
5	Senri Ikuma (JPN)	63.00	64.60	45.50	89.30	68.25	30.60	361.25
6	Syafiq Puteh (MAS)	63.00	60.45	64.60	43.50	61.25	64.50	357.30
7	Shin Jung-whi (KOR)	63.00	62.00	51.00	75.25	70.00	36.00	357.25
8	Max Lee (SGP)	67.50	62.00	61.20	39.00	61.50	64.60	355.80
9	Nazar Kozhanov (KAZ)	54.00	61.20	77.00	71.40	60.45	28.50	352.55
10	Sam Vajir (IRI)	52.70	64.50	60.00	47.25	65.10	56.10	345.65
11	Vyacheslav Kachanov (UZB)	71.40	68.00	27.00	46.80	73.50	55.10	341.80
12	Yong Rui Jie (MAS)	49.60	69.30	60.00	64.50	31.50	62.90	337.80
