= Canada at the 2022 World Aquatics Championships =

- Flag of Canada
- World Aquatics code: CAN
- National federation: Aquatic Federation of Canada
- Website: aquaticscanadaaquatiques.com

in Budapest, Hungary 18 June 2022 – 3 July 2022
- Competitors: 76 (30 men and 46 women)
- Medals Ranked 5th: Gold 3 Silver 5 Bronze 6 Total 14

World Aquatics Championships appearances
- 1973; 1975; 1978; 1982; 1986; 1991; 1994; 1998; 2001; 2003; 2005; 2007; 2009; 2011; 2013; 2015; 2017; 2019; 2022; 2023; 2024; 2025

Canada competed at the 2022 World Aquatics Championships in Budapest, Hungary from June 18 to July 3, 2022. Canadian athletes competed in all five disciplines held at the championships. Canada's team consisted of 76 athletes.

The Canadian team won 14 medals a record high for one edition of the event, including 11 in swimming, also a new record.

== Athletes by discipline ==
The following is the list of number of competitors participating at the Championships per discipline.

Sport	Men	Women	Total
Artistic swimming	0	12	12
Diving	3	3	6
Open water swimming	4	1*	5
Swimming	10	17	27
Water polo	13	13	26
Total	30	46	76

- 2 female athletes will compete in both open water swimming and in indoor swimming, they are included within the swimming numbers.

== Artistic swimming ==
Canada's 12 member artistic swimming team (all women) was named on June 14, 2022.

Women

Athlete	Event	Preliminaries		Final	
Athlete	Event	Points	Rank	Points	Rank
Audrey Lamothe	Solo technical routine	83.1821	10 Q	83.0909	10
Audrey Lamothe	Solo free routine	84.5333	9 Q	85.4000	9
Sydney Carroll; Scarlett Finn; Laurianne Imbeau; Audrey Lamothe; Kenzie Priddell; Kiara Quieti; Alicia Rehel*; Claire Scheffel; Raphaelle Plante	Team technical routine	84.7752	7 Q	84.4817	8
Rosalie Boissonneault; Scarlett Finn; Laurianne Imbeau; Audrey Lamothe; Raphaelle Plante; Kenzie Priddell; Kiara Quieti; Alicia Rehel	Team free routine	Did not start			
Rosalie Boissonneault; Sydney Carroll; Scarlett Finn; Laurianne Imbeau; Raphaelle Plante; Kenzie Priddell; Kiara Quieti; Claire Scheffel; Kiana Sweet; Maude Turcotte	Highlight routine	85.1000	7 Q	85.2000	7

- Competed in preliminary only

== Diving ==
Canada's diving team consisted of six athletes (three men and three women).

Men

Athlete	Event	Preliminaries		Semifinals		Final	
Athlete	Event	Points	Rank	Points	Rank	Points	Rank
Bryden Hattie	3 m springboard	360.00	22	Did not advance			
Rylan Wiens	10 m platform	415.15	7 Q	419.25	9 Q	416.20	9
Nathan Zsombor-Murray	10 m platform	400.25	10 Q	421.50	8 Q	446.55	7
Rylan Wiens; Nathan Zsombor-Murray	Synchronized 10 m platform	377.88	4 Q	—N/a		417.12	3rd place, bronze medalist(s)

Women

Athlete	Event	Preliminaries		Semifinals		Final	
Athlete	Event	Points	Rank	Points	Rank	Points	Rank
Margo Erlam	1 m springboard	250.75	8 Q	—N/a		246.10	9
Margo Erlam	3 m springboard	224.00	29	Did not advance			
Mia Vallée	1 m springboard	249.60	9 Q	—N/a		276.60	3rd place, bronze medalist(s)
Mia Vallée	3 m springboard	304.95	4 Q	300.45	4 Q	329.00	2nd place, silver medalist(s)
Caeli McKay	10 m platform	320.35	6 Q	336.30	3 Q	318.45	5
Margo Erlam; Mia Vallée	Synchronized 3 m springboard	282.60	4 Q	—N/a		282.90	5

== Open water swimming ==
Canada entered seven open water swimmers (four men and three women). Katrina Bellio and Abby Dunford also competed in the pool competitions. Eric Hedlin was named to the team but did not compete in any event.

Men

Athlete	Event	Time	Rank
Alexander Axon	5 km	58:21.5	33
Eric Brown	10 km	1:56:15.0	36
Hau-Li Fan	10 km	1:54:29.6	17

Women

Athlete	Event	Time	Rank
Abby Dunford	5 km	1:01:08.9	31
Emma Finlin	5 km	1:01:01.3	28
Katrina Bellio	10 km	2:09:13.2	34
Abby Dunford	10 km	2:10:21.2	38

Mixed

Athlete	Event	Time	Rank
Katrina Bellio; Alexander Axon; Emma Finlin; Eric Brown	Team relay	1:07:34.7	11

== Swimming ==
Canada's swimming team consisted of 27 swimmers (10 men and 17 women). The team was selected at the conclusion of the Canadian Swim Trials that were held in Victoria, British Columbia.

Men

Athlete	Event	Heat		Semifinal		Final	
Athlete	Event	Time	Rank	Time	Rank	Time	Rank
Yuri Kisil	50 m freestyle	22.71	41	Did not advance			
Joshua Liendo	50 m freestyle	21.72	2 Q	21.73	3 Q	21.61 NR	5
Ruslan Gaziev	100 m freestyle	48.49	=14 Q	49.00	16	Did not advance	
Joshua Liendo	100 m freestyle	48.16	4 Q	47.55	3 Q	47.71	3rd place, bronze medalist(s)
Ruslan Gaziev	200 m freestyle	1:48.10	25	Did not advance			
Jeremy Bagshaw	400 m freestyle	3:50.77	21	—N/a		Did not advance	
Javier Acevedo	50 m backstroke	25.18	18	Did not advance			
Javier Acevedo	100 m backstroke	54.97	22	Did not advance			
Richie Stokes	200 m backstroke	1:59.86	17	Did not advance			
James Dergousoff	50 m breaststroke	DQ		Did not advance			
James Dergousoff	100 m breaststroke	DQ		Did not advance			
James Dergousoff	200 m breaststroke	2:13.89	23	Did not advance			
Finlay Knox	100 m butterfly	53.05	31	Did not advance			
Joshua Liendo	100 m butterfly	50.97	2 Q	51.14	3 Q	50.97	3rd place, bronze medalist(s)
Patrick Hussey	200 m butterfly	2:00.24	29	Did not advance			
Finlay Knox	200 m individual medley	1:59.60	17	Did not advance			
Collyn Gagne	400 m individual medley	4:17.85	14	—N/a		Did not advance	
Javier Acevedo; Ruslan Gaziev; Yuri Kisil; Joshua Liendo	4 × 100 m freestyle relay	3:13.08	5 Q	—N/a		3:11.99	6
Jeremey Bagshaw; Ruslan Gaziev; Finlay Knox; Patrick Hussey	4 × 200 m freestyle relay	7:18.34	11	—N/a		Did not advance	
Javier Acevedo; James Dergousoff; Ruslan Gaziev; Joshua Liendo	4 × 100 m medley relay	3:35.62	11	—N/a		Did not advance	

Women

Athlete	Event	Heat		Semifinal		Final	
Athlete	Event	Time	Rank	Time	Rank	Time	Rank
Kayla Sanchez	50 m freestyle	25.15	13 Q	WD		Did not advance	
Penny Oleksiak	100 m freestyle	53.70	2 Q	53.18	4 Q	52.98	4
Kayla Sanchez	100 m freestyle	54.06	5 Q	53.61	6 Q	53.59	6
Penny Oleksiak	200 m freestyle	1:57.22	=3	DQ		Did not advance	
Taylor Ruck	200 m freestyle	1:58.41	14	1:56.80	6 Q	1:57.24	=6
Summer McIntosh	400 m freestyle	4:03.19	2 Q	—N/a		3:59.39 NR	2nd place, silver medalist(s)
Katrina Bellio	800 m freestyle	8:45.67	17	—N/a		Did not advance	
Katrina Bellio	1500 m freestyle	16:54.55	19	—N/a		Did not advance	
Abby Dunford	1500 m freestyle	16:46.01	17	—N/a		Did not advance	
Kylie Masse	50 m backstroke	27.26	1 Q	27.22	1 Q	27.31	1st place, gold medalist(s)
Ingrid Wilm	50 m backstroke	27.55	3 Q	27.39	4 Q	27.43	4
Kylie Masse	100 m backstroke	58.89	2 Q	58.57	2 Q	58.40	2nd place, silver medalist(s)
Taylor Ruck	100 m backstroke	1:01.14	17	Did not advance			
Kylie Masse	200 m backstroke	2:09.37	6 Q	2:09.23	6 Q	2:08.00	5
Taylor Ruck	200 m backstroke	DNS		Did not advance			
Rachel Nicol	50 m breaststroke	31.24	18	Did not advance			
Sophie Angus	100 m breaststroke	1:08.76	24	Did not advance			
Kelsey Wog	200 m breaststroke	2:24.37	1 Q	2:23.82	5 Q	2:23.86	4
Katerine Savard	50 m butterfly	26.47	=15 Q	26.14	13	Did not advance	
Katerine Savard	100 m butterfly	58.22	10 Q	57.98	11	Did not advance	
Rebecca Smith	100 m butterfly	58.65	12 Q	58.15	12	Did not advance	
Summer McIntosh	200 m butterfly	2:07.26	1 Q	2:05.79 WJR, NR	1 Q	2:05.20 WJR, NR	1st place, gold medalist(s)
Mary-Sophie Harvey	200 m individual medley	2:10.38	4 Q	2:10.22 Q	4	2:12.77	8
Sydney Pickrem	200 m individual medley	2:11.60	10 Q	2:11.28	11	Did not advance	
Tessa Cieplucha	400 m individual medley	4:44.53	11	—N/a		Did not advance	
Summer McIntosh	400 m individual medley	4:36.15	1 Q	—N/a		4:32.04 WJR	1st place, gold medalist(s)
Maggie Mac Neil; Penny Oleksiak; Kayla Sanchez; Taylor Ruck; Katerine Savard*; Rebecca Smith*	4 × 100 m freestyle relay	3:35.34	3 Q	—N/a		3:32.15	2nd place, silver medalist(s)
Summer McIntosh; Penny Oleksiak; Kayla Sanchez; Taylor Ruck; Katerine Savard*; Rebecca Smith*; Mary-Sophie Harvey*	4 × 200 m freestyle relay	7:53.59	4 Q	—N/a		7:44.76	3rd place, bronze medalist(s)
Kylie Masse; Rachel Nicol; Maggie Mac Neil; Penny Oleksiak; Kayla Sanchez*; Kelsey Wog*; Ingrid Wilm*	4 × 100 m medley relay	3:58.38	4 Q	—N/a		3:55.01	3rd place, bronze medalist(s)

- Raced in heat only and received medals.

Mixed

Athlete	Event	Heat		Final	
Athlete	Event	Time	Rank	Time	Rank
Javier Acevedo; Joshua Liendo; Kayla Sanchez; Penny Oleksiak; Ruslan Gaziev*; Taylor Ruck*; Maggie Mac Neil*	4 × 100 m freestyle relay	3:25.30	2 Q	3:20.61	2nd place, silver medalist(s)
Javier Acevedo; Rachel Nicol; Katerine Savard; Yuri Kisil	4 × 100 m medley relay	3:35.34	11	Did not advance	

== Water polo ==
Canada qualified both a men's and women's team. The men's team qualified for the first time since 2017. On June 24, the Canadian men's team withdrew from the tournament after multiple positive COVID-19 cases amongst the team.

Summary

Key:
- FT – After full time.
- P – Match decided by penalty-shootout.

Team	Event	Group stage				Playoff	Quarterfinal	Semifinals	Final	
Team	Event	Opposition Score	Opposition Score	Opposition Score	Rank	Opposition Score	Opposition Score	Opposition Score	Opposition Score	Rank
Canada men's	Men's tournament	Spain; L 2–19	Italy cancelled	South Africa cancelled	4	withdrew				16
Canada women's	Women's tournament	Italy; D 7–7	Colombia; W 22–2	Hungary; L 7–11	Netherlands; L 7–10	—N/a		Classification 9–12; Kazakhstan; W 19–11	9th place match New Zealand; W 20–11	9

=== Men's tournament ===
Roster

Canada's roster consisted of 13 athletes.

- Milan Radenovic
- Brody McKnight
- Nicolas Constantin Bicari
- Jérémie Blanchard
- Jeremie Cote
- Reuel D'Souza
- Bogdan Djerkovic
- Aleksa Gardijan
- Matthew Halajian
- Gaelan Patterson
- Maxime Schapowal
- Aria Soleimanipak
- Sean Spooner

Group C

Pos	Team	Pld	W	D	L	GF	GA	GD	Pts	Qualification
1	Spain	2	2	0	0	42	14	+28	4	Quarterfinals
2	Italy	2	1	0	1	34	18	+16	2	Playoffs
3	South Africa	2	0	0	2	6	50	−44	0	Playoffs
4	Canada (Note: On 24 June, the Canadian team withdrew from the tournament after multiple positive COVID-19 cases amongst the team.)	0	0	0	0	0	0	0	0	Withdrew

Source: Sportresult
Rules for classification: 1) points; 2) head-to-head points; 3) head-to-head goal difference; 4) head-to-head number of goals scored; 5) Goal difference.
Notes:

21 June 2022 (Annulled) (Note: The Canadian national team later withdrew, so the result of the match was canceled and annulled afterward.); 19:30	Report	Canada	2–19	Spain	Sopron Lover Pool, Sopron; Referees: György Kun (HUN), Agustin Pinski (ARG)
21 June 2022 (Annulled); 19:30	Report	Score by quarters: 0–2, 2–7, 0–6, 0–4			Sopron Lover Pool, Sopron; Referees: György Kun (HUN), Agustin Pinski (ARG)
21 June 2022 (Annulled); 19:30	Report	Constantin-Bicari, D'Souza 1	Goals	Perrone 5	Sopron Lover Pool, Sopron; Referees: György Kun (HUN), Agustin Pinski (ARG)

Cancelled (Note: The match, originally scheduled for 23 June 2022, was postponed due to health concerns.)	Italy	–	Canada

Cancelled	Canada	–	South Africa

=== Women's tournament ===
Roster

Canada's roster consisted of 13 athletes.

- Amanada Amorosa
- Verica Bakoc
- Kyra Christmas
- Axelle Crevier
- Jessica Gaudreault
- Shae La Roche
- Rae Lekness
- Kelly McKee
- Hayley McKelvey
- Kindred Paul
- Gurpreet Sohi
- Clara Vulpisi
- Emma Wright

Group A

Pos	Team	Pld	W	D	L	GF	GA	GD	Pts	Qualification
1	Italy	3	2	1	0	48	21	+27	5	Quarterfinals
2	Hungary (H)	3	2	0	1	55	21	+34	4	Playoffs
3	Canada	3	1	1	1	36	20	+16	3	Playoffs
4	Colombia	3	0	0	3	11	88	−77	0	

Source: Sportresult
Rules for classification: 1) points; 2) head-to-head points; 3) head-to-head goal difference; 4) head-to-head number of goals scored; 5) Goal difference.
(H) Hosts

20 June 2022; 19:30	Report	Canada	7–7	Italy	Alfréd Hajós National Swimming Stadium, Budapest; Referees: Georgios Stavridis (GRE), Andrew Carney (AUS)
20 June 2022; 19:30	Report	Score by quarters: 2–4, 3–2, 1–1, 1–0			Alfréd Hajós National Swimming Stadium, Budapest; Referees: Georgios Stavridis (GRE), Andrew Carney (AUS)
20 June 2022; 19:30	Report	McKelvey, Wright 2	Goals	Giustini 2	Alfréd Hajós National Swimming Stadium, Budapest; Referees: Georgios Stavridis (GRE), Andrew Carney (AUS)

22 June 2022; 19:30	Report	Colombia	2–22	Canada	Alfréd Hajós National Swimming Stadium, Budapest; Referees: Anbar Anbar (KUW), Dion Willis (RSA)
22 June 2022; 19:30	Report	Score by quarters: 1–3, 1–5, 0–7, 0–7			Alfréd Hajós National Swimming Stadium, Budapest; Referees: Anbar Anbar (KUW), Dion Willis (RSA)
22 June 2022; 19:30	Report	Ortega, Restrepo 1	Goals	McKelvey 5	Alfréd Hajós National Swimming Stadium, Budapest; Referees: Anbar Anbar (KUW), Dion Willis (RSA)

24 June 2022; 21:00	Report	Hungary	11–7	Canada	Alfréd Hajós National Swimming Stadium, Budapest; Referees: Michiel Zwart (NED), Frank Ohme (GER)
24 June 2022; 21:00	Report	Score by quarters: 2–1, 3–3, 4–0, 2–3			Alfréd Hajós National Swimming Stadium, Budapest; Referees: Michiel Zwart (NED), Frank Ohme (GER)
24 June 2022; 21:00	Report	Keszthelyi 3	Goals	McKelvey 3	Alfréd Hajós National Swimming Stadium, Budapest; Referees: Michiel Zwart (NED), Frank Ohme (GER)

Playoffs

26 June 2022; 14:00	Report	Canada	7–10	Netherlands	Alfréd Hajós National Swimming Stadium, Budapest; Referees: Raffaele Colombo (ITA), David Gómez (ESP)
26 June 2022; 14:00	Report	Score by quarters: 2–1, 1–2, 2–6, 2–1			Alfréd Hajós National Swimming Stadium, Budapest; Referees: Raffaele Colombo (ITA), David Gómez (ESP)
26 June 2022; 14:00	Report	seven players 1	Goals	three players 2	Alfréd Hajós National Swimming Stadium, Budapest; Referees: Raffaele Colombo (ITA), David Gómez (ESP)

9–12th place semifinals

28 June 2022; 18:30	Report	Canada	19–11	Kazakhstan	Szeged Tiszavirag Pool, Szeged; Referees: Ivan Raković (SRB), Fabio Toffoli (BRA)
28 June 2022; 18:30	Report	Score by quarters: 3–2, 6–3, 5–3, 5–3			Szeged Tiszavirag Pool, Szeged; Referees: Ivan Raković (SRB), Fabio Toffoli (BRA)
28 June 2022; 18:30	Report	three players 4	Goals	Yeremina 3	Szeged Tiszavirag Pool, Szeged; Referees: Ivan Raković (SRB), Fabio Toffoli (BRA)

9th place match

30 June 2022; 18:30	Report	New Zealand	11–20	Canada	Szeged Tiszavirag Pool, Szeged; Referees: Pascal Bouchez (FRA), Veselin Mišković (MNE)
30 June 2022; 18:30	Report	Score by quarters: 1–4, 1–5, 5–6, 4–5			Szeged Tiszavirag Pool, Szeged; Referees: Pascal Bouchez (FRA), Veselin Mišković (MNE)
30 June 2022; 18:30	Report	Houghton 6	Goals	Lekness 4	Szeged Tiszavirag Pool, Szeged; Referees: Pascal Bouchez (FRA), Veselin Mišković (MNE)

== See also ==
- Canada at the 2022 World Athletics Championships
- Canada at the 2022 Commonwealth Games
