= 2023 European Diving Championships – Women's synchronized 3 metre springboard =

Women's synchronized 3 metre springboard at the 2023 European Diving Championships
- Venue: Rzeszów Diving Arena
- Date: 26 June
- Competitors: 16 from 8 nations
- Teams: 8
- Winning points: 279.90

Medalists
gold medal	Desharne Bent-Ashmeil; Amy Rollinson	Great Britain
silver medal	Lena Hentschel; Jana Rother	Germany
bronze medal	Elena Bertocchi; Chiara Pellacani	Italy

The women's synchronized 3 metre springboard event at the 2023 European Diving Championships was held on 26 June 2023.

== Results ==
The final was held at 16:00.

Rank	Nation	Divers	D1	D2	D3	D4	D5	Total
1st place, gold medalist(s)	Great Britain	Desharne Bent-Ashmeil; Amy Rollinson	36.00	43.20	65.70	67.50	67.50	279.90
2nd place, silver medalist(s)	Germany	Lena Hentschel; Jana Rother	44.40	40.80	59.40	65.70	66.03	276.33
3rd place, bronze medalist(s)	Italy	Elena Bertocchi; Chiara Pellacani	46.20	47.40	63.00	58.59	58.50	273.69
4	Netherlands	Inge Jansen; Celine van Duijn	43.20	42.60	63.90	61.20	61.20	272.10
5	Sweden	Emilia Nilsson Garip; Elna Widerström	46.20	47.40	56.70	54.00	55.89	260.19
6	Norway	Caroline Kupka; Helle Tuxen	40.20	42.60	57.12	43.20	53.46	236.58
7	Hungary	Eszter Kovács; Estilla Mosena	40.80	39.60	47.52	39.69	50.40	218.01
8	Lithuania	Vita Šlajūtė; Urtė Valeišaitė	38.40	40.80	46.80	44.55	43.92	214.47
