= Esther Qin =

Australian diver (born 1991)

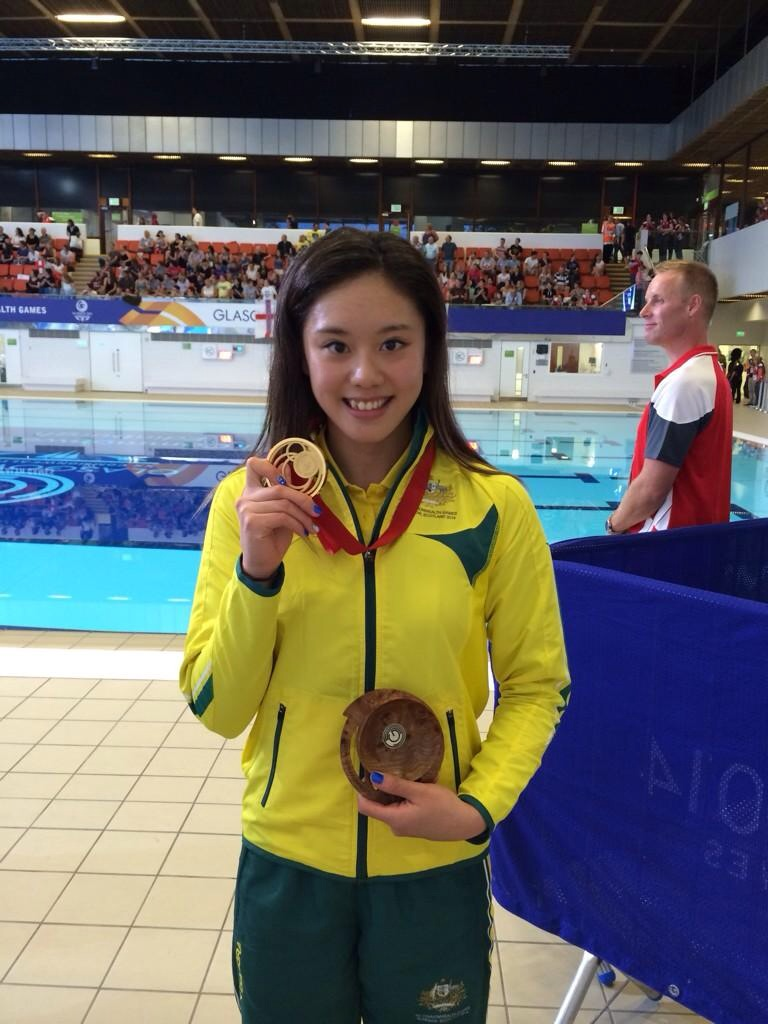
- Esther Qin won the gold medal in the Women's 3m springboard, 2014 Commonwealth Games.

Personal information
- Native name: 覃帆 (Qín Fān)
- Full name: Fan Esther Qin (or Esther Qin = 艾丝特·覃)
- Born: 18 November 1991 (age 34) Liuzhou, Guangxi, China
- Height: 167 cm (5 ft 6 in)
- Weight: 58 kg (128 lb)

Sport
- Country: Australia
- Team: Diving Australia
Medal record
Women's Diving
Representing Australia
World Championships
Bronze medal – third place	2015 Kazan	3m synchronized
Commonwealth Games
Gold medal – first place	2014 Glasgow	3m springboard
Gold medal – first place	2018 Gold Coast	3m synchronized springboard
Bronze medal – third place	2014 Glasgow	1m springboard
Bronze medal – third place	2018 Gold Coast	1m springboard
Universiade
Silver medal – second place	2013 Kazan	3m synchronized

Esther Qin (Chinese: 覃帆; pinyin: Qín Fān; lit. 'Qin Sail'; born 18 November 1991) is a Chinese-born Australian retired diver.

== Personal life ==
Qin was born in Liuzhou, Guangxi, China to a Zhuang family. Her family moved to Australia in 2009, as her father had found a position as a chef.

== Diving career ==
=== In China ===
Qin started diving at the age of eleven in China and competed in several national competitions.

=== For Australia ===
Qin competed at the 2013 Summer Universiade in Kazan, Russia, won a silver medal in the 3m synchronised with Samantha Mills. She also competed in the 1 m and 3 m springboard.
At the 2014 Commonwealth Games in Glasgow, Scotland, she won the gold medal in the women's 3m springboard, a bronze medal in women's 1m springboard and came 4th in the women's synchronised 3 metre springboard alongside Anna Gelai. She was coached by Chava Sobrino at the New South Wales Institute of Sport.

At the 2015 World Aquatics Championships, Kazan, Russia, she won a bronze medal in the 3m synchronized with Samantha Mills.

She competed at the 2016 Olympics where she finished 6th in the women's 3 metre springboard event.

Qin partnered with Georgia Sheehan in the 2018 Commonwealth Games to achieve first place and received a gold medal in the 3m synchronised springboard event. Qin also won a bronze medal in the women's 1m springboard event and came 5th in the women's 3 metre springboard event.

Qin qualified for the Tokyo 2020 Olympics where she came 12th in the women's 3-metre springboard event.

She competed at the 2022 Commonwealth Games where she came 5th in the women's synchronised 3 metre springboard event alongside Brittany O'Brien and 6th in the women's 1 metre springboard event.

Qin announced her retirement from international diving on December 5, 2022.
