= Diving at the 2022 Commonwealth Games – Women's 3 metre springboard =

Women's 3 metre springboard at the 2022 Commonwealth Games
- Venue: Sandwell Aquatics Centre
- Date: 7 August
- Competitors: 13 from 6 nations
- Winning score: 348.95

Medalists
gold medal	Maddison Keeney	Australia
silver medal	Nur Dhabitah Sabri	Malaysia
bronze medal	Mia Vallée	Canada

The women's 3 metre springboard is part of the Diving at the 2022 Commonwealth Games program. The competition will be held on 7 August 2022 at Sandwell Aquatics Centre in Birmingham.

== Format ==
The competition will be held in two rounds:

- Preliminary round: All divers perform five dives; the top 12 divers advance to the final.
- Final: The 12 divers perform five dives; the preliminary round scores are erased and the top three divers win the gold, silver and bronze medals accordingly.

== Schedule ==
All times are British Summer Time (UTC+1).

Date	Start	Round
Sunday 7 August 2022	11:44	Preliminary
Sunday 7 August 2022	19:10	Finals

== Results ==
Green denotes finalists

Rank	Diver	Preliminary		Final					
Rank	Diver	Points	Rank	Dive 1	Dive 2	Dive 3	Dive 4	Dive 5	Points
1st place, gold medalist(s)	Maddison Keeney (AUS)	327.90	1	64.50	64.50	72.00	75.95	72.00	348.95
2nd place, silver medalist(s)	Nur Dhabitah Sabri (MAS)	276.25	6	67.50	74.40	66.00	55.50	67.50	330.90
3rd place, bronze medalist(s)	Mia Vallée (CAN)	302.10	2	57.00	69.75	64.50	66.00	72.00	329.25
4	Desharne Bent-Ashmeil (ENG)	294.30	3	63.00	60.45	69.00	58.50	64.50	315.45
5	Margo Erlam (CAN)	270.00	9	54.00	63.00	66.65	61.50	64.50	309.65
6	Yasmin Harper (ENG)	278.45	5	63.00	63.00	58.90	60.00	61.50	306.40
7	Georgia Sheehan (AUS)	271.50	7	60.00	63.00	51.00	63.00	69.00	306.00
8	Grace Reid (SCO)	285.55	4	61.50	55.50	51.00	67.50	65.10	300.60
9	Brittany O'Brien (AUS)	271.50	7	63.00	58.80	49.50	63.00	58.50	292.80
10	Evie Smith (ENG)	228.15	12	56.70	51.80	54.60	58.80	54.00	275.90
11	Clara Kerr (SCO)	235.10	11	50.40	58.80	54.60	54.00	46.20	264.00
12	Ong Ker Ying (MAS)	257.70	10	45.60	55.50	49.50	34.50	46.50	231.60
13	Maggie Squire (NZL)	190.00	13	Did not advance					
