= Emily Martin =

Emily Martin may refer to:

- Emily Martin (1884–1962), a.k.a. Emily Dutton, South Australian musician and socialite
- Emily Martin (anthropologist) (born 1944), sinologist, anthropologist, and feminist
- Emily Martin (rower) (born 1979), Australian rower
- Emily Martin (diver), British diver
- Emily Winfield Martin, American artist and author-illustrator of children's books
