= Diving at the 2024 European Aquatics Championships – Women's 3 m springboard =

Women's 3 m springboard at the 2024 European Aquatics Championships
- Venue: Serbian Institute for Sports and Sports Medicine
- Dates: 21 June
- Competitors: 21 from 15 nations
- Winning points: 305.15

Medalists
gold medal	Desharne Bent-Ashmeil	Great Britain
silver medal	Helle Tuxen	Norway
bronze medal	Clare Cryan	Ireland

The Women's 3 m springboard competition of the 2024 European Aquatics Championships was held on 21 June 2024.

== Results ==
The preliminary round was started at 10:00. The final was held at 17:05.

Green denotes finalists

Rank	Diver	Nationality	Preliminary		Final	
Rank	Diver	Nationality	Points	Rank	Points	Rank
1st place, gold medalist(s)	Desharne Bent-Ashmeil	Great Britain	256.45	3	305.15	1
2nd place, silver medalist(s)	Helle Tuxen	Norway	232.70	10	243.20	2
3rd place, bronze medalist(s)	Clare Cryan	Ireland	239.75	6	240.55	3
4	Jana Lisa Rother	Germany	235.20	9	235.55	4
5	Elna Widerström	Sweden	225.10	12	232.50	5
6	Caroline Kupka	Norway	236.35	8	229.00	6
7	Matilde Borello	Italy	226.00	11	228.15	7
8	Lauren Hallaselkä	Finland	241.60	5	224.60	8
9	Amy Rollinson	Great Britain	238.35	7	221.30	9
10	Naïs Gillet	France	265.80	1	219.65	10
11	Elettra Neroni	Italy	242.40	4	193.45	11
12	Emilia Nilsson Garip	Sweden	261.10	2	Withdrew	12
13	Sude Köprülü	Turkey	224.10	13	Did not advance	
14	Luisa Arco	Portugal	223.50	14	Did not advance	
15	Tereza Jelínková	Czech Republic	219.15	15	Did not advance	
16	Aleksandra Błażowska	Poland	216.50	16	Did not advance	
17	Viktoriya Kesar	Ukraine	176.75	17	Did not advance	
18	Juliette Landi	France	209.60	18	Did not advance	
19	Estilla Mosena	Hungary	164.55	19	Did not advance	
20	Tekle Sharia	Serbia	150.55	20	Did not advance	
	Lotti Hubert	Germany	Withdrew			
