= Qin / Tan (surname) =

Chinese family name

覃 is a Chinese surname that can be pronounced in Mandarin as Tán or Qín, with the latter being common among Zhuang people. A 2013 study found it to be the 96th most common surname, shared by 2,400,000 people or 0.180% of the population, with the province-level unit with the most being the Guangxi Zhuang Autonomous Region.

Tangya Tusi City, located in Xianfeng County, Hubei, is the historic capital of Qin clan Tusi (Chinese: 覃氏土司) of Tangya. The Qin clan were the rulers of the Tangya Tusi and hereditarily governed a territory of 600 square kilometres (230 sq mi) for four centuries in the modern-day Xianfeng County. As the capital, the site was built in 1355 during the late Yuan dynasty and was abandoned in 1755 during the Qing dynasty.

== Notable people ==
=== Qin ===
- Esther Qin (覃帆; born 1991), Chinese-born Australian retired diver
- Qin Haiyang (覃海洋; born 1999), Chinese swimmer, Olympic gold medalist
- Qin Qian (覃茜; born 1964), Chinese musician specializes in the erhu
- Qin Weizhong (覃伟中; born 1971), Chinese politician, current mayor of Shenzhen
- Qin Yingji (覃应机; 1915–1992), People's Republic of China politician
- Qin Zhen (覃振; 1885–1947), Chinese politician

=== Tan ===
- Thum Ping Tjin (覃炳鑫) (born 1979), Singaporean former swimmer, historian, journalist

== See also ==
- Wéi
