= Swimming at the 2022 World Aquatics Championships – Women's 1500 metre freestyle =

Women's 1500 metre freestyle at the 2022 World Aquatics Championships
- Venue: Danube Arena
- Location: Budapest, Hungary
- Dates: 19 June (heats); 20 June (final)
- Competitors: 26 from 20 nations
- Winning time: 15:30.15

Medalists
gold medal	Katie Ledecky	United States
silver medal	Katie Grimes	United States
bronze medal	Lani Pallister	Australia

The Women's 1500 metre freestyle competition at the 2022 World Aquatics Championships was held on 19 and 20 June 2022.

== Records ==
Prior to the competition, the existing world and championship records were as follows.

World record	Katie Ledecky (USA)	15:20.48	Indianapolis, United States	16 May 2018
Competition record	Katie Ledecky (USA)	15:25.48	Kazan, Russia	4 August 2015

== Results ==
=== Heats ===
The heats were started on 19 June at 10:17.

Rank	Heat	Lane	Name	Nationality	Time	Notes
1	3	4	Katie Ledecky	United States	15:47.02	Q
2	2	4	Simona Quadarella	Italy	15:56.19	Q
3	3	5	Katie Grimes	United States	15:57.05	Q
4	2	5	Lani Pallister	Australia	15:57.61	Q
5	2	3	Moesha Johnson	Australia	15:57.77	Q
6	2	8	Beatriz Dizotti	Brazil	16:08.35	Q, NR
7	3	7	Viviane Jungblut	Brazil	16:09.27	Q
8	2	6	Kristel Köbrich	Chile	16:13.52	Q
9	3	3	Li Bingjie	China	16:13.92	
10	3	2	Miyu Namba	Japan	16:20.45	
11	2	0	Diana Durães	Portugal	16:25.23	
12	3	6	Viktória Mihályvári-Farkas	Hungary	16:26.41	
13	3	9	Caitlin Deans	New Zealand	16:30.47	
14	1	4	Gan Ching Hwee	Singapore	16:32.43	NR
15	3	8	Ángela Martínez	Spain	16:38.39	
16	2	2	Zhang Ke	China	16:42.92	
17	2	1	Abby Dunford	Canada	16:46.01	
18	2	9	Han Da-kyung	South Korea	16:47.45	
19	3	0	Katrina Bellio	Canada	16:54.55	
20	2	7	Paula Otero	Spain	16:57.76	
21	1	5	Stephanie Houtman	South Africa	17:08.12	
22	1	3	Võ Thị Mỹ Thiện	Vietnam	17:14.54	
23	1	7	Nip Tsz Yin	Hong Kong	17:15.64	
24	1	6	Yarinda Sunthornrangsri	Thailand	17:26.95	
25	1	2	Goh Chia Tong	Malaysia	17:33.03	
26	1	1	Vár Erlingsdóttir Eidesgaard	Faroe Islands	17:36.49	
	3	1	Marlene Kahler	Austria		DNS

=== Final ===
The final was held on 20 June at 18:11.

Rank	Lane	Name	Nationality	Time	Notes
1st place, gold medalist(s)	4	Katie Ledecky	United States	15:30.15	
2nd place, silver medalist(s)	3	Katie Grimes	United States	15:44.89	
3rd place, bronze medalist(s)	6	Lani Pallister	Australia	15:48.96	
4	2	Moesha Johnson	Australia	15:55.75	
5	5	Simona Quadarella	Italy	16:03.84	
6	7	Beatriz Dizotti	Brazil	16:05.25	NR
7	1	Viviane Jungblut	Brazil	16:13.89	
8	8	Kristel Köbrich	Chile	16:20.24	
