= Diving at the 2022 Commonwealth Games – Women's synchronised 3 metre springboard =

Women's synchronised 3 metre springboard at the 2022 Commonwealth Games
- Venue: Sandwell Aquatics Centre
- Date: 6 August
- Competitors: 10 from 4 nations
- Winning score: 316.53

Medalists
| gold medal | Maddison Keeney; Anabelle Smith | Australia |
| silver medal | Ng Yan Yee; Nur Dhabitah Sabri | Malaysia |
| bronze medal | Margo Erlam; Mia Vallée | Canada |

The women's synchronised 3 metre springboard was part of the 2022 Commonwealth Games diving program. The competition was held on 6 August 2022 at Sandwell Aquatics Centre in Birmingham, England.

Reigning champion Esther Qin of Australia returns to defend her title with a new partner Brittany O'Brien. As in previous Games, nations can send more than one team to a synchronised event. Australia have entered two teams in this event.

== Schedule ==
All times are BST (UTC+1)

| Date | Time | Round |
|---|---|---|
| 6 August 2022 | 11:51 | Finals |

== Format ==
A single round will be held, with each team making five dives. Eleven judges score each dive: three for each diver, and five for synchronisation. Only the middle score counts for each diver, with the middle three counting for synchronisation. These five scores are averaged, multiplied by 3, and multiplied by the dive's degree of difficulty to give a total dive score. The scores for each of the five dives are then aggregated to give a final score.

== Field ==
The initial field for the event was published on 22 July 2022:

| Rank | Nation | Dives | | | | | Total |
| Rank | Nation | Dive 1 | Dive 2 | Dive 3 | Dive 4 | Dive 5 | Total |
|---|---|---|---|---|---|---|---|
| 1st place, gold medalist(s) | Australia 1 Maddison Keeney; Anabelle Smith | 49.80 | 49.20 | 71.10 | 75.33 | 71.10 | 316.53 |
| 2nd place, silver medalist(s) | Malaysia; Ng Yan Yee; Nur Dhabitah Sabri | 46.20 | 48.00 | 68.40 | 69.75 | 67.50 | 299.85 |
| 3rd place, bronze medalist(s) | Canada; Margo Erlam; Mia Vallée | 48.00 | 45.60 | 66.60 | 68.40 | 68.40 | 297.00 |
| 4 | England; Amy Rollinson; Desharne Bent-Ashmeil | 45.00 | 46.80 | 61.20 | 61.20 | 63.90 | 278.10 |
| 5 | Australia 2 Esther Qin; Brittany O'Brien | 46.80 | 45.60 | 64.80 | 46.80 | 64.80 | 268.80 |
