= Georgia Sheehan =

Australian diver (born 1999)

Personal information
- Full name: Georgia Rae Leslie Sheehan
- Nationality: Australian
- Born: 10 July 1999 (age 26) Everton Park, Queensland
- Height: 1.73 m (5 ft 8 in)

Sport
- Sport: Diving
Medal record
Women's diving
Representing Australia
Commonwealth Games
Gold medal – first place	2018 Gold Coast	3 m synchro

Georgia Rae Leslie Sheehan (born 10 July 1999) is an Australian diver.

Sheehan competed in the women's 1 metre springboard event at the 2019 World Aquatics Championships.

She competed at the Commonwealth Games in 2018 where she won a gold medal in the women's synchronised 3 metre springboard event alongside Esther Qin and in 2022 where she came 5th in the women's 1 metre springboard event and 7th in the women's 3 metre springboard event.

Sheehan graduated from the Queensland University of Technology with a Bachelor of Creative Industries with distinction in 2023.
