= Hailey Hernandez =

American diver (born 2003)

Personal information
- Full name: Hailey Rosanne Hernandez
- Born: March 23, 2003 (age 23)
- Home town: Southlake, Texas
- Height: 5 ft 1 in (155 cm)

Sport
- Country: United States
- Event: 3m
- College team: University of Texas
- Club: GC Divers
- Coached by: Jeff Bro, Matt Scoggin
Medal record
Women's diving
Representing United States
Pan American Games
Bronze medal – third place	2023 Santiago	1 m springboard
Bronze medal – third place	2023 Santiago	3 m synchro

Hailey Rosanne Hernandez (born March 23, 2003) is an American diver.

== Personal life ==
Hernandez graduated from Southlake Carroll High School in 2021 and currently attends the University of Texas, where she is majoring in exercise science.

== Career ==
Hernandez started diving at age seven. She is a four-time Texas 6A high school state champion and a two-time world junior medalist.

She qualified for the 2020 Olympics in the women's 3-meter springboard, placing second behind Krysta Palmer. Her dives had the lowest degree of difficulty among the Olympic contenders, although she made up for it by being the most consistent performing diver in the meet.

== International Competition Results ==
Competition	Event	2017	2018	2019	2020	2021	2022	2023	2024
International representing USA
Olympic Games	3m Springboard					9th			-
FINA World Aquatics Championships	1m Springboard							7th	6th
FINA World Aquatics Championships	3m Springboard							6th	
FINA Diving World Cup	3m Springboard		9th					15th	
FINA Diving World Cup (Super Final)	3m Springboard							6th	
FINA Diving World Cup (Super Final)	Team Event							4th	
Pan American Games	1m Springboard							3rd place, bronze medalist(s)	
Pan American Games	3m Springboard							4th	
Pan American Games	3m Springboard Synchro							3rd place, bronze medalist(s)	
International representing USA (Junior)
FINA World Junior Diving Championships	1m Springboard		2nd place, silver medalist(s)						
FINA World Junior Diving Championships	3m Springboard		2nd place, silver medalist(s)						
Junior Pan American Championships	1m Springboard			2nd place, silver medalist(s)					
Junior Pan American Championships	3m Springboard			2nd place, silver medalist(s)					
Junior Pan American Championships	3m Springboard Synchro	1st place, gold medalist(s)		1st place, gold medalist(s)					
Junior Pan American Championships	Platform	2nd place, silver medalist(s)							

== Domestic Competition Results ==
Competition	Event	2013	2014	2015	2016	2017	2018	2019	2020	2021	2022	2023	2024
National (Senior)
USA Diving National Championships (Spring / Winter)	1m Springboard	-				5th / 4th	2nd place, silver medalist(s)	6th / (gold)		3rd place, bronze medalist(s)	2nd place, silver medalist(s)	1st place, gold medalist(s)	
USA Diving National Championships (Spring / Winter)	3m Springboard	-			1st place, gold medalist(s)	(bronze) / 4th	1st place, gold medalist(s)	5th		1st place, gold medalist(s)	2nd place, silver medalist(s)	2nd place, silver medalist(s)	
USA Diving National Championships (Spring / Winter)	3m Springboard Synchro	-				5th		4th		1st place, gold medalist(s)			
USA Diving Trials	1m Springboard	-					4th						
USA Diving Trials	3m Springboard	-				8th	4th			2nd place, silver medalist(s)			
USA Diving Trials	3m Springboard Synchro	-								4th			
College (representing University of Texas)
NCAA Diving Championships	1m Springboard	-									4th	4th	
NCAA Diving Championships	3m Springboard	-									8th	9th	
Big 12 Championship	1m Springboard	-									1st place, gold medalist(s)	1st place, gold medalist(s)	
Big 12 Championship	3m Springboard	-									1st place, gold medalist(s)	2nd place, silver medalist(s)	
National (Junior)
USA Diving Junior National Championships	1m Springboard	21st	6th	4th	3rd place, bronze medalist(s)		1st place, gold medalist(s)	1st place, gold medalist(s)	-				
USA Diving Junior National Championships	3m Springboard	7th	2nd place, silver medalist(s)	7th	1st place, gold medalist(s)		1st place, gold medalist(s)	1st place, gold medalist(s)	-				
USA Diving Junior National Championships	1m Springboard Synchro			3rd place, bronze medalist(s)	2nd place, silver medalist(s)				-				
USA Diving Junior National Championships	3m Springboard Synchro			2nd place, silver medalist(s)	2nd place, silver medalist(s)			1st place, gold medalist(s)	-				
USA Diving Junior National Championships	Platform	5th	1st place, gold medalist(s)	3rd place, bronze medalist(s)	1st place, gold medalist(s)		2nd place, silver medalist(s)		-				
USA Diving Junior Trials	1m Springboard						1st place, gold medalist(s)	-					
USA Diving Junior Trials	3m Springboard						1st place, gold medalist(s)	-					
USA Diving Junior Trials	3m Springboard Synchro						2nd place, silver medalist(s)	-					
USA Diving Junior Trials	Platform						1st place, gold medalist(s)	-					

== Awards ==
- 2x Big 12 Diver of the Year (2021-2022, 2022-2023)
- 2x Big 12 Championship Diver of the Meet (2022, 2023)
- 3x All American
- 1x Honorable-Mention All American
- Academic All-Big 12 Rookie Team (2021-2022)
- Academic All-Big 12 First Team (2022-2023)
