= Diving at the 2018 Commonwealth Games – Women's synchronised 3 metre springboard =

Women's synchronised 3 metre springboard at the 2018 Commonwealth Games
- Venue: Gold Coast Aquatic Centre
- Date: April 11
- Competitors: 14 from 6 nations
- Winning score: 284.10

Medalists
gold medal	Esther Qin; Georgia Sheehan	Australia
silver medal	Alicia Blagg; Katherine Torrance	England
bronze medal	Leong Mun Yee; Nur Dhabitah Sabri	Malaysia

The women's synchronised 3 metre springboard was part of the Diving at the 2018 Commonwealth Games program. The competition was held on 11 April 2018 at Gold Coast Aquatic Centre in Gold Coast.

== Format ==
A single round was held, with each team making five dives. Eleven judges scored each dive: three for each diver, and five for synchronisation. Only the middle score counted for each diver, with the middle three counting for synchronization. These five scores were averaged, multiplied by 3, and multiplied by the dive's degree of difficulty to give a total dive score. The scores for each of the five dives were summed to give a final score.

== Schedule ==
All times are Australian Eastern Standard Time (UTC+10).

Date	Start	Round
April 11	11:55	Finals

== Results ==
Results:

Rank	Nation	Dives					Total
Rank	Nation	1	2	3	4	5	Total
1st place, gold medalist(s)	Australia; Esther Qin; Georgia Sheehan	47.40	46.80	57.60	61.20	71.10	284.10
2nd place, silver medalist(s)	England; Alicia Blagg; Katherine Torrance	50.40	49.20	64.80	52.20	60.30	276.90
3rd place, bronze medalist(s)	Malaysia; Leong Mun Yee; Nur Dhabitah Sabri	46.80	48.00	69.30	58.50	42.30	264.90
4	New Zealand; Elizabeth Cui; Goh Yu Qian	42.00	43.20	63.00	48.60	54.90	251.70
5	Canada; Jennifer Abel; Mélissa Citrini-Beaulieu	48.60	48.60	71.10	33.48	45.00	246.78
6	South Africa; Micaela Bouter; Nicole Gillis	38.40	40.20	54.00	49.50	56.70	238.80
7	Australia; Maddison Keeney; Anabelle Smith	49.80	42.00	70.20	62.31	0.00	224.31
