= Diving at the 2022 Commonwealth Games – Women's synchronised 10 metre platform =

Women's synchronised 10 metre platform at the 2022 Commonwealth Games
- Venue: Sandwell Aquatics Centre
- Date: 6 August
- Competitors: 12 from 4 nations
- Winning score: 306.00

Medalists
gold medal	Melissa Wu; Charli Petrov	Australia
silver medal	Eden Cheng; Andrea Spendolini-Sirieix	England
bronze medal	Emily Martin; Robyn Birch	England

The women's synchronised 10 metre platform is part of the 2022 Commonwealth Games diving program. The competition will be held on 6 August 2022 at Sandwell Aquatics Centre in Birmingham, England.

== Schedule ==
All times are BST (UTC+1)

Date	Time	Round
16 August 2022	21:00	Finals

== Format ==
A single round will be held, with each team making five dives. Eleven judges score each dive: three for each diver, and five for synchronisation. Only the middle score counts for each diver, with the middle three counting for synchronisation. These five scores are averaged, multiplied by 3, and multiplied by the dive's degree of difficulty to give a total dive score. The scores for each of the five dives are then aggregated to give a final score.

== Results ==
The initial field for the event was published on 22 July 2022:

Rank	Nation	Dives					Total
Rank	Nation	1	2	3	4	5	Total
1st place, gold medalist(s)	Australia; Melissa Wu; Charli Petrov	49.80	51.60	70.20	65.28	69.12	306.00
2nd place, silver medalist(s)	England; Eden Cheng; Andrea Spendolini-Sirieix	49.80	47.40	56.70	68.16	76.80	298.86
3rd place, bronze medalist(s)	England; Emily Martin; Robyn Birch	48.60	49.20	57.60	70.08	62.40	287.88
4	Malaysia; Nur Dhabitah Sabri; Pandelela Rinong	48.60	51.00	70.20	41.28	75.84	286.92
5	Canada; Caeli McKay; Celina Toth	49.20	46.20	63.00	73.92	53.76	286.08
6	Australia; Emily Boyd; Nikita Hains	41.40	49.20	70.08	54.90	59.52	275.10
