= Diving at the 2023 Pan American Games – Women's 1 metre springboard =

Women's 1 metre springboard at the 2023 Pan American Games
- Venue: Aquatics Centre
- Dates: October 22
- Competitors: 15 from 9 nations

Medalists
Gold medal	Pamela Ware	Canada
Silver medal	Mia Vallée	Canada
Bronze medal	Hailey Hernandez	United States

The women's 1 metre springboard competition of the diving events at the 2023 Pan American Games was held on October 22 at the Aquatics Centre in Santiago, Chile. A total of 15 divers from nine countries took part.

== Qualification ==
A total of up to 80 divers (40 per gender) across all events qualified to compete. A nation may enter a maximum of 10 divers (if entering teams in synchronized diving) or 6 athletes (if not entering teams in synchronized diving), with the exception of the winners of the 2021 Junior Pan American Games, provided that these athletes participate only in the event in which they qualified in Cali. The host nation (Chile) automatically qualified a full team of 10 athletes (five per gender). The top 18 men and women in individual events in the 2022 and 2023 FINA World Championships will secure spots for their NOCs. In addition, at each of the CONSANAT Championships (Zone 1) and the PAQ Qualifying Diving Championships (Zone 2), divers from federations competing in such events may earn a quota position for their NOCs provided that the total number of divers from such Zones do not exceed 24 divers on all boards (including those who are ranked in FINA from such competing federations but excluding any divers from CHI). Zone 3 and 4 divers do not have separate qualifiers within their zones. National championships or trials events in Zones 3 and 4 may be used to name divers to already qualified positions.

== Schedule ==
Date	Time	Round
October 22, 2023	10:00	Preliminary
October 22, 2023	19:55	Final

== Results ==
Green denotes finalists

Rank	Diver	Nationality	Preliminary		Final	
Rank	Diver	Nationality	Points	Rank	Points	Rank
1st place, gold medalist(s)	Pamela Ware	Canada	259.95	3	280.25	1
2nd place, silver medalist(s)	Mia Vallée	Canada	274.90	1	272.30	2
3rd place, bronze medalist(s)	Hailey Hernandez	United States	248.35	5	261.75	3
4	Arantxa Chávez	Mexico	267.10	2	258.85	4
5	Joslyn Oakley	United States	213.25	11	240.95	5
6	Daniela Zapata	Colombia	230.85	6	238.50	6
7	Anisley García	Cuba	216.00	9	238.25	7
8	Carolina Mendoza	Mexico	226.35	8	236.50	8
9	Elizabeth Perez Noguera	Venezuela	228.40	7	232.65	9
10	Prisis Ruiz Randich	Cuba	258.90	4	231.95	10
11	Ana Ricci	Peru	216.00	9	216.65	11
12	Rebeca Santana	Brazil	203.45	12	177.45	12
13	Luana Lira	Brazil	203.35	13	Did not advance	
14	Victoria Garza	Dominican Republic	201.60	14	Did not advance	
15	Mayte Salinas	Peru	156.60	15	Did not advance	
