= Zheng Jiuyuan =

Chinese diver (born 2004)

Personal information
- Nationality: Chinese
- Born: 13 April 2004 (age 22)

Sport
- Country: China
- Sport: Diving
Medal record
Men's diving
Representing China
World Championships
Gold medal – first place	2023 Fukuoka	Team
Gold medal – first place	2025 Singapore	1 m springboard
Gold medal – first place	2025 Singapore	3 m synchro
Bronze medal – third place	2023 Fukuoka	1 m springboard
Asian Games
Gold medal – first place	2026 Aichi–Nagoya	3 m synchro
Silver medal – second place	2022 Hangzhou	3 m springboard
Silver medal – second place	2026 Aichi–Nagoya	3 m springboard

Zheng Jiuyuan (born 13 April 2004) is a Chinese diver.

== Career ==
Zheng made his World Aquatics Championships debut in 2022 World Aquatics Championships and finished in eighth place in the 1 metre springboard event with a score of 365.55. He again competed at the World Championships in 2023 and won a gold medal in the team event with a score of 489.65. He also won a bronze medal in the 1 metre springboard event with a score of 418.30. In October 2023, he competed at the 2022 Asian Games and won a silver medal in the 3 metre springboard event with a score of 508.55.

Zheng competed at the 2025 World Aquatics Championships and won a gold medal in the 1 metre springboard with a score of 443.70, finishing 14.10 points ahead of silver medalist Osmar Olvera. He also won a gold medal in the 3 metre synchro with Wang Zongyuan.
