= Diving at the 2014 Commonwealth Games – Women's synchronised 3 metre springboard =

Women's synchronised 3 metre springboard at the 2014 Commonwealth Games
- Venue: Royal Commonwealth Pool
- Date: July 30
- Competitors: 12 from 4 nations
- Winning score: 300.24

Medalists
gold medal	Alicia Blagg; Rebecca Gallantree	England
silver medal	Jennifer Abel; Pamela Ware	Canada
bronze medal	Maddison Keeney; Anabelle Smith	Australia

The women's synchronised 3 metre springboard was part of the Diving at the 2014 Commonwealth Games program. The competition was held on 30 July 2014 at Royal Commonwealth Pool in Edinburgh.

== Format ==
A single round was held, with each team making five dives. Eleven judges scored each dive: three for each diver, and five for synchronisation. Only the middle score counted for each diver, with the middle three counting for synchronization. These five scores were averaged, multiplied by 3, and multiplied by the dive's degree of difficulty to give a total dive score. The scores for each of the five dives were summed to give a final score.

== Schedule ==
All times are British Summer Time (UTC+1).

Date	Start	Round
July 30	19:31	Finals

== Results ==
Results:

Rank	Nation	Dives					Total
Rank	Nation	1	2	3	4	5	Total
1st place, gold medalist(s)	England; Alicia Blagg; Rebecca Gallantree	49.20	49.80	65.70	63.00	72.54	300.24
2nd place, silver medalist(s)	Canada; Jennifer Abel; Pamela Ware	51.00	47.40	68.40	60.45	68.40	295.65
3rd place, bronze medalist(s)	Australia; Maddison Keeney; Anabelle Smith	49.20	46.20	63.90	68.82	66.60	294.72
4	Australia; Anna Gelai; Esther Qin	49.80	50.40	60.30	65.70	63.90	290.10
5	Malaysia; Cheong Jun Hoong; Loh Zhiayi	50.40	50.40	66.60	51.24	64.80	283.44
6	Malaysia; Nur Dhabitah Sabri; Ng Yan Yee	44.40	47.40	69.30	58.59	63.00	282.69
