= Diving at the 2026 Asian Games – Men's synchronized 3 metre springboard =

Diving competition

Men's synchronized 3 metre springboard at the 2026 Asian Games
- Venue: Tokyo Aquatics Centre
- Date: 26 September 2026
- Competitors: 18 from 9 nations

Medalists
gold medal	Wang Zongyuan; Zheng Jiuyuan	China
silver medal	Senri Ikuma; Haruki Suyama	Japan
bronze medal	Yong Rui Jie; Nurqayyum Nazmi Nazim	Malaysia

The men's synchronized 3 metre springboard competition at the 2026 Asian Games took place on 26 September 2026 at Tokyo Aquatics Centre.

== Schedule ==
All times are Japan Standard Time (UTC+09:00)

Date	Time	Event
Saturday, 26 September 2026	13:00	Final

== Results ==
Rank	Team	Dive						Total
Rank	Team	1	2	3	4	5	6	Total
1st place, gold medalist(s)	China (CHN); Wang Zongyuan; Zheng Jiuyuan	54.00	50.40	90.30	89.76	86.64	94.77	465.87
2nd place, silver medalist(s)	Japan (JPN); Senri Ikuma; Haruki Suyama	46.80	46.20	66.96	71.40	67.50	56.70	355.56
3rd place, bronze medalist(s)	Malaysia (MAS); Yong Rui Jie; Nurqayyum Nazmi Nazim	40.80	46.20	69.30	62.10	64.17	63.24	345.81
4	South Korea (KOR); Kim Ji-wook; Shin Jung-whi	49.20	47.40	66.96	47.94	57.75	73.50	342.75
5	Uzbekistan (UZB); Vyacheslav Kachanov; Igor Myalin	43.80	40.20	61.20	63.24	58.50	58.59	325.53
6	Thailand (THA); Thitipoom Marksin; Chawanwat Juntaphadawon	45.00	36.00	55.65	63.90	57.66	53.04	311.25
7	Kazakhstan (KAZ); Nazar Kozhanov; Kirill Novikov	39.00	34.20	60.30	61.20	51.30	56.73	302.73
8	Iran (IRI); Sam Vajir; Mohammad Moghaddasi	44.40	40.20	62.10	50.40	43.20	51.15	291.45
9	Hong Kong (HKG); Yuen Pak Kwan; Yuen Pak Yin	39.60	37.20	33.00	41.76	45.36	42.84	239.76
