= Sam Fricker =

Australian diver

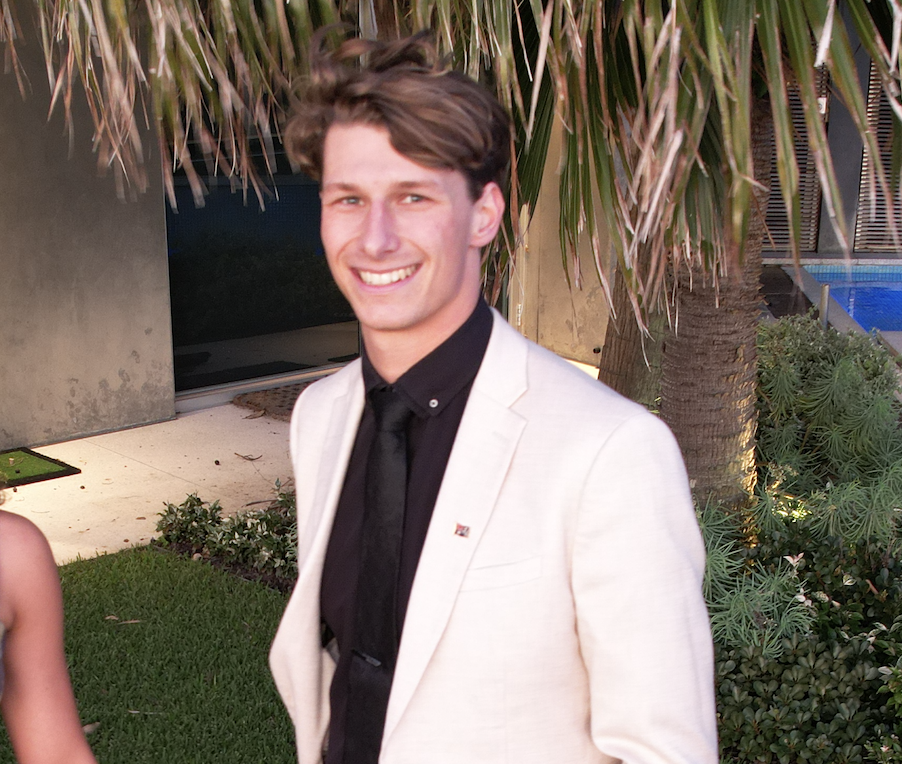

Personal information
- Born: 4 May 2002 (age 24) Newcastle, New South Wales, Australia
- Height: 188 cm (6 ft 2 in)

Sport
- Sport: Diving
- Event: 10 metre platform
Medal record
Men's diving
Representing Australia
Commonwealth Games
Bronze medal – third place	2022 Birmingham	3 m synchro

Samuel Fricker (born 4 May 2002) is an Australian diver. He competed in the 2020 Summer Olympics. Fricker grew up in Newcastle and now lives at Cronulla in Sydney. Fricker has used his social media following to produce content and support various charities.

== Biography ==
Fricker enrolled in his first diving competition at age 10. Prior to that he had competed in gymnastics and athletics. At the age of 12, Fricker won the 1m springboard, the 5m platform and the 3m synchronised springboard dives at the 2015 National Age Diving Championships. He became Diver of the Year in the 12–13 years category.

Fricker went to Trinity Grammar School in Sydney where he captained the diving team and was trained at the NSW Institute of Sport under coaches such as Thomas Rickards and Chava Sobrino. Since competing in the Tokyo 2020 Olympics, Fricker has amassed a large following on social media. He has over 1.2 million followers on TikTok and more than 5 million subscribers on YouTube. He also hosts the Diving Deep podcast, where he interviews athletes and entrepreneurs.

He currently runs a company that makes bio–degradable wheat straws. Fricker founded the business at age 16 to provide eco-friendly alternatives to plastic straws and promote sustainability. On 19 August 2021, Fricker became the second guest to join sports journalism brand and business Featuring Faulks. Fricker competed at the 2022 Commonwealth Games where he won a bronze medal in the men's synchronised 3m springboard event alongside Li Shixin and placed 10th in both the 10m platform and 3m springboard events. On 29 November 2022, Fricker was awarded the Australian Sports Medal by the Governor of New South Wales. In 2024, he was named an official ambassador for XPENG Australia and TrueEV, promoting electric vehicles and climate-conscious innovation.

== Charity work ==
Fricker has supported a range of environmental and youth-focused organizations. He has actively participated in Clean Up Australia Day, joining fellow athletes in community clean-up events in 2020 and 2021. He also serves as a Youth Patron for CollaborOceans, contributing to ocean conservation initiatives such as the Youth Ocean Carnival and World Ocean Day.

== International competitions ==
Year	Competition	Venue	Event	Position	Score
Representing Australia
2020	Olympic Games	Tokyo, Japan	10m platform	28th	
2022	Commonwealth Games	Birmingham, England	Synchronised 3m springboard	3rd	374.52
2022	Commonwealth Games	Birmingham, England	10m platform	10th	390.35
