= Charli Petrov =

Australian diver

Personal information
- Born: 18 October 2007 (age 18) Melbourne, Australia

Sport
- Country: Australia
- Sport: Diving
- Event(s): 10 m platform, 10 m synchro
Medal record
Representing Australia
Olympic Games
Commonwealth Games
Gold medal – first place	2022 Birmingham	10 m synchro platform

Charli Petrov (born 18 October 2007) is an Australian diver. She won a gold medal at the 2022 Commonwealth Games, in Synchronised 10 m platform.
