= Li Shixin =

Chinese/Australian diver

Personal information
- Native name: 李世鑫
- Nationality: Australian
- Born: 12 February 1988 (age 38) Maoming, Guangdong, China

Sport
- Country: Australia
- Sport: Diving
- Event(s): 1 m, 1 m synchro
Medal record
Men's diving
Representing Australia
World Championships
Silver medal – second place	2024 Doha	1 m springboard
Bronze medal – third place	2022 Budapest	1 m springboard
Bronze medal – third place	2024 Doha	Team event
Commonwealth Games
Silver medal – second place	2022 Birmingham	1 m springboard
Silver medal – second place	2022 Birmingham	3 m mixed synchro
Bronze medal – third place	2022 Birmingham	3 m synchro
Representing China
World Championships
Gold medal – first place	2011 Shanghai	1 m springboard
Gold medal – first place	2013 Barcelona	1 m springboard

Li Shixin (Chinese: 李世鑫; pinyin: Lǐ Shìxīn; born 12 February 1988) is a Chinese-born Australian diver who specialises in the 1 metre springboard event. Li won gold medals in the 1 metre springboard event in the 2011 and 2013 World Aquatics Championships.

== Career ==
In 2019, he chose to represent Australia in international competitions.

Li qualified for the Tokyo 2020 Olympics and competed in the Men's 3m Springboard. He came 27th.

At the 2022 World Aquatics Championships, he won a bronze medal in the 1 metre springboard event.

At the 2022 Commonwealth Games, with diving competition held in August, Shixin ranked first in the preliminaries of the 1 metre springboard with a score of 388.70 points and qualified for the final. He won the silver medal in the final with a score of 437.05 points, which was 10.00 points behind gold medalist Jack Laugher of England. With partner Sam Fricker in the 3 metre synchronised springboard the following day, the duo won the bronze medal with a score of 374.52 points. In the morning on day three of diving competition, he scored 456.65 points in the preliminaries of the 3 metre springboard, qualifying for the final ranking first. He placed fifth in the final with a score of 448.50 points, less than 12 points behind fourth-place finisher James Heatly of Scotland. The final day, he won a silver medal in the mixed 3 metre synchronised springboard with partner Maddison Keeney, scoring 304.02 points.
