= Diving at the 2023 SEA Games – Results =

The men's diving competitions at the 2023 SEA Games in Cambodia took place at the Olympic Stadium Pool in Phnom Penh from 8 to 11 May 2023. The 2023 Games comprises 4 medal events.

== Results ==
=== Men's 3 m springboard ===
Rank	Diver	Final						
Rank	Diver	Dive 1	Dive 2	Dive 3	Dive 4	Dive 5	Dive 6	Points
1st place, gold medalist(s)	Muhammad Syafiq Puteh (MAS)	67.50	69.75	56.10	63.00	69.00	52.50	377.85
2nd place, silver medalist(s)	Gabriel Gilbert Daim (MAS)	55.50	54.00	69.75	54.00	60.00	72.00	365.25
3rd place, bronze medalist(s)	Avvir Pac Lun Tham (SGP)	63.00	54.00	65.10	49.50	54.00	74.80	360.40
4	Chawanwat Juntaphadawon (THA)	48.00	60.00	63.00	62.00	59.50	66.30	358.80
5	Nguyen Tung Duong (VIE)	63.00	62.00	61.20	50.75	55.50	24.00	316.45
6	Dinh Anh Tuan (VIE)	58.50	58.90	54.40	48.00	39.00	43.50	302.30
7	Thitiwut Phoemphun (THA)	40.50	39.60	35.65	42.00	33.60	40.50	231.85

=== Men's 10 m platform ===
Rank	Diver	Final						
Rank	Diver	Dive 1	Dive 2	Dive 3	Dive 4	Dive 5	Dive 6	Points
1st place, gold medalist(s)	Enrique Maccartney Harold (MAS)	78.00	86.40	76.80	71.40	77.55	52.80	442.95
2nd place, silver medalist(s)	Bertrand Rhodict Lises (MAS)	73.50	76.80	54.45	61.05	51.00	67.20	384.00
3rd place, bronze medalist(s)	Shen Oon Max Lee (SGP)	63.00	54.40	59.40	61.20	49.60	75.20	362.80
4	Joseph Mendoza Reynado (PHI)	55.50	54.40	65.60	66.70	31.50	36.45	310.15
5	Hoang Tu Dang (VIE)	34.65	57.35	57.00	46.25	39.00	55.50	289.75
6	Adithep Khopuechklang (THA)	39.20	37.80	42.00	44.40	43.50	50.70	257.60
7	Dinh Anh Tuan (VIE)	47.50	54.25	33.00	18.60	42.90	45.00	241.25
8	Trinapas Santibut (THA)	26.60	32.00	52.50	48.00	39.60	40.50	239.20

=== Women's 3 m springboard ===
Rank	Diver	Final					
Rank	Diver	Dive 1	Dive 2	Dive 3	Dive 4	Dive 5	Points
1st place, gold medalist(s)	Kimberly Bong (MAS)	51.30	54.00	64.40	49.00	57.60	276.30
2nd place, silver medalist(s)	Gladies Lariesa Garina Haga (INA)	60.00	49.60	46.50	54.00	63.00	273.10
3rd place, bronze medalist(s)	Ong Ker Ying (MAS)	49.20	51.00	49.50	40.50	58.50	248.70
4	Lilli Prateep (THA)	44.40	47.25	37.50	50.40	55.35	234.90
5	Ngô Phương Mai (VIE)	43.20	45.90	45.60	53.20	44.80	232.70
6	Alycia Charlotte Lim (SGP)	34.80	48.60	47.60	46.20	35.70	212.90
7	Ariana Hannah Talingting Drake (PHI)	43.20	37.80	43.40	39.20	30.00	193.60
8	Lu-Si Tan Minnich (CAM)	36.00	39.60	37.20	40.25	37.80	190.85
8	Yanisa Promcharoen (THA)	25.60	23.75	30.40	26.40	1.00	107.15

=== Women's 10 m platform ===
Rank	Diver	Final					
Rank	Diver	Dive 1	Dive 2	Dive 3	Dive 4	Dive 5	Points
1st place, gold medalist(s)	Lee Yiat Qing (MAS)	43.20	48.45	37.95	64.40	59.80	253.80
2nd place, silver medalist(s)	Thi Hong Giang Bui (VIE)	37.80	49.50	49.30	53.80	46.80	242.20
3rd place, bronze medalist(s)	Gladies Lariesa Garina Haga (INA)	51.00	51.00	34.80	50.40	40.00	228.00
4	Nur Elisha Rania (MAS)	58.80	48.00	50.75	26.60	42.90	227.05
5	Lilli Prateep (THA)	49.00	36.00	52.80	45.00	42.90	225.70
6	Ong Rei En (SGP)	46.80	40.50	41.40	50.40	9.00	188.10
7	Lu-Si Tan Minnich (CAM)	31.45	29.60	31.20	15.30	23.25	130.80
