= Chile at the 2022 World Aquatics Championships =

- Flag of Chile
- FINA code: CHI
- National federation: Chilean Federation of Aquatics Sport

in Budapest, Hungary
- Competitors: 5 in 2 sports
- Medals: Gold 0 Silver 0 Bronze 0 Total 0

World Aquatics Championships appearances
- 1973; 1975; 1978; 1982; 1986; 1991; 1994; 1998; 2001; 2003; 2005; 2007; 2009; 2011; 2013; 2015; 2017; 2019; 2022; 2023; 2024

Chile competed at the 2022 World Aquatics Championships in Budapest, Hungary from 18 June to 3 July.

== Diving ==
Athlete	Event	Preliminaries		Semifinals		Final	
Athlete	Event	Points	Rank	Points	Rank	Points	Rank
Diego Carquin	Men's 3 m springboard	312.15	40	did not advance			
Donato Neglia	Men's 1 m springboard	280.45	36	—		did not advance	
Donato Neglia	Men's 3 m springboard	347.15	30	did not advance			

== Swimming ==
Athlete	Event	Heat		Semifinal		Final	
Athlete	Event	Time	Rank	Time	Rank	Time	Rank
Elias Ardiles	Men's 50 m backstroke	26.71	35	did not advance			
Elias Ardiles	Men's 200 m backstroke	2:07.92	30	did not advance			
Felipe Baffico	Men's 100 m butterfly	55.32	48	did not advance			
Felipe Baffico	Men's 200 m butterfly	2:01.99	34	did not advance			
Kristel Köbrich	Women's 800 m freestyle	8:37.02	11	—		did not advance	
Kristel Köbrich	Women's 1500 m freestyle	16:13.52	8 Q	—		16:20.24	8
