= Diving at the 2022 Commonwealth Games – Women's 1 metre springboard =

Women's 1 metre springboard at the 2022 Commonwealth Games
- Venue: Sandwell Aquatics Centre
- Date: 5 August
- Competitors: 12 from 6 nations
- Winning score: 291.85

Medalists
gold medal	Mia Vallée	Canada
silver medal	Brittany O'Brien	Australia
bronze medal	Amy Rollinson	England

The women's 1 metre springboard is part of the Diving at the 2022 Commonwealth Games program. The competition will be held on 5 August 2022 at Sandwell Aquatics Centre in Birmingham.

== Format ==
The competition will be held in two rounds:

- Preliminary round: All divers perform five dives; the top 12 divers advance to the final.
- Final: The 12 divers perform five dives; the preliminary round scores are erased and the top three divers win the gold, silver and bronze medals accordingly.

== Schedule ==
All times are British Summer Time (UTC+1).

Date	Start	Round
5 August	10:05	Preliminary
5 August	18:05	Finals

== Results ==
As twelve divers entered the competition at the preliminary stage, there were no eliminations, with all divers qualifying for the final. Results in the preliminaries were, however, used to seed the final and decide the final diving order.

Green denotes finalists

Rank	Diver	Preliminary		Final					
Rank	Diver	Points	Rank	Dive 1	Dive 2	Dive 3	Dive 4	Dive 5	Points
1st place, gold medalist(s)	Mia Vallée (CAN)	292.20	1	57.20	65.10	57.00	54.05	58.50	291.85
2nd place, silver medalist(s)	Brittany O'Brien (AUS)	223.70	8	54.00	54.60	51.75	63.00	56.25	279.60
3rd place, bronze medalist(s)	Amy Rollinson (ENG)	237.50	6	57.60	50.70	43.70	61.50	58.50	272.00
4	Grace Reid (SCO)	259.10	5	49.45	51.60	54.60	54.00	58.50	268.15
5	Georgia Sheehan (AUS)	266.00	4	49.45	52.80	55.90	54.60	55.20	267.95
6	Qin Fan (AUS)	266.95	3	55.20	54.60	48.30	57.60	49.40	265.10
7	Yasmin Harper (ENG)	274.60	2	52.80	34.50	52.80	59.50	54.60	254.50
8	Clara Kerr (SCO)	206.65	11	50.40	51.75	39.60	50.70	47.50	239.95
9	Margo Erlam (CAN)	229.75	7	50.40	44.20	50.40	44.85	49.40	239.25
10	Maggie Squire (NZL)	208.65	9	49.20	41.40	43.20	49.40	49.40	232.60
11	Kimberly Bong (MAS)	204.75	12	50.40	50.70	33.35	46.80	43.75	225.00
12	Ong Ker Ying (MAS)	207.50	10	46.80	46.80	41.40	43.20	28.60	206.80
