= Diving at the 2022 Commonwealth Games – Men's synchronised 3 metre springboard =

Men's synchronised 3 metre springboard at the 2022 Commonwealth Games
- Venue: Sandwell Aquatics Centre
- Date: 5 August
- Competitors: 10 from 4 nations
- Winning score: 438.33

Medalists
gold medal	Jack Laugher; Anthony Harding	England
silver medal	Muhammad Syafiq Puteh; Gabriel Gilbert Daim	Malaysia
bronze medal	Li Shixin; Sam Fricker	Australia

The men's synchronised 3 metre springboard is part of the Diving at the 2022 Commonwealth Games program. The competition will be held on 5 August 2022 at Sandwell Aquatics Centre in Birmingham, England.

Jack Laugher returns as two-time defending champion, but with a new partner, Anthony Harding, following the retirement of fellow double-Commonwealth and Olympic gold medalist Chris Mears, and the move to a new partnership of his 2020 Olympic partner Daniel Goodfellow, who joins Jordan Houlden. As in previous Games, nations can send more than one team to a synchronised event. Malaysia also field two teams.

== Schedule ==
All times are BST (UTC+1)

Date	Time	Round
5 August 2022	11:22	Finals

== Format ==
A single round will be held, with each team making six dives. Eleven judges score each dive: three for each diver, and five for synchronisation. Only the middle score counts for each diver, with the middle three counting for synchronisation. These five scores ware averaged, multiplied by 3, and multiplied by the dive's degree of difficulty to give a total dive score. The scores for each of the six dives are then aggregated to give a final score.

== Results ==
The initial field for the event was published on 22 July 2022:

Rank	Nation	Dives						Total
Rank	Nation	1	2	3	4	5	6	Total
1st place, gold medalist(s)	England; Jack Laugher; Anthony Harding	49.80	51.60	87.82	79.56	88.92	80.73	438.33
2nd place, silver medalist(s)	Malaysia; Muhammad Syafiq Puteh; Gabriel Gilbert Daim	47.40	48.00	73.80	73.47	67.50	66.60	376.77
3rd place, bronze medalist(s)	Australia; Li Shixin; Sam Fricker	47.40	45.00	66.60	72.54	67.50	75.48	374.52
4	Scotland; Ross Beattie; James Heatly	46.20	49.80	67.50	70.20	64.17	71.40	369.27
5	Malaysia; Chew Yiwei; Ooi Tze Liang	49.80	49.80	71.10	76.26	40.59	78.54	366.09
