= Gabriel Gilbert Daim =

Malaysian diver (born 2001)

Personal information
- Nationality: Malaysian
- Born: Gabriel Gilbert Daim; 9 October 2001 (age 24) Sabah, Malaysia
- Height: 150 cm (4 ft 11 in)

Sport
- Country: Malaysia
- Sport: Diving
Medal record
Diving
Representing Malaysia
Commonwealth Games
Silver medal – second place	2022 Birmingham	3 m synchro platform
Southeast Asian Games
Gold medal – first place	2017 Kuala Lumpur	Team event
Silver medal – second place	2023 Phnom Penh	3 m springboard
Silver medal – second place	2021 Hanoi	3 m springboard

Gabriel Gilbert Daim (born 9 October 2001) is a Malaysian diver. He competes in 1m springboard, 3m springboard, mixed synchronized diving 3m and synchronized diving 3m.

== Career ==
2017

Daim teamed up with Nur Dhabitah Sabri to bagged a silver in 3m mixed synchronized diving platform in Kuala Lumpur, Malaysia. It was his first medal in the Fina Diving Grand Prix. After that, he and Nur Dhabitah Sabri managed to advance to the final again and won his second silver medal in 3m mixed synchronized diving platform in Gold Coast. Australia. Not only that, he also won his first gold medal at 2017 Southeast Asian Games in team event.

2018

Daim made his first debut in Commonwealth Games . He finished 7th in the Men's synchronised 3 metre springboard with Muhammad Syafiq Puteh. In the same year, Daim competed in the World Diving Championships but had to accept the defeat after placing 6th in the Men's Synchronized diving 3m with his partner Muhammad Syafiq Puteh.

2019

He won his first title in Fina Diving Grand Prix after collecting 363.30 points in the Men's Synchronized diving 3m event with his partner Muhammad Syafiq Puteh.

2021

Daim brought a silver medal for Malaysia in the Men's 3m spring board at the 2021 Southeast Asian Games.

2022

Daim and Muhammad Syafiq Puteh have surprised the nation after winning a silver medal in the 3m synchronized springboard event at the 2022 Commonwealth Games.
