= Diving at the 2024 European Aquatics Championships – Women's 3 m synchro springboard =

Women's 3 m synchro springboard at the 2024 European Aquatics Championships
- Venue: Serbian Institute For Sports And Sports Medicine
- Dates: 20 June
- Competitors: 16 from 8 nations
- Winning points: 269.10

Medalists
gold medal	Desharne Bent-Ashmeil; Amy Rollinson	Great Britain
silver medal	Nina Janmyr; Elna Widerström	Sweden
bronze medal	Naïs Gillet; Juliette Landi	France

The Women's 3 m synchro springboard competition of the 2024 European Aquatics Championships was held on 20 June 2024.

== Results ==
The final was started at 15:30.

Rank	Nation	Divers	Points					
Rank	Nation	Divers	T1	T2	T3	T4	T5	Total
1st place, gold medalist(s)	Great Britain	Desharne Bent-Ashmeil; Amy Rollinson	43.20	43.20	58.50	59.40	64.80	269.10
2nd place, silver medalist(s)	Sweden	Nina Janmyr; Elna Widerström	42.60	42.00	58.59	62.10	53.46	258.75
3rd place, bronze medalist(s)	France	Naïs Gillet; Juliette Landi	42.00	41.40	46.20	54.60	59.13	243.33
4	Germany	Lotti Hubert; Jana Lisa Rother	45.60	36.60	53.10	56.70	50.40	242.40
5	Ukraine	Viktoriya Kesar; Anna Pysmenska	44.40	37.80	56.70	43.71	50.40	233.01
6	Italy	Matilde Borello; Elettra Neroni	45.60	42.00	59.52	43.20	32.40	222.72
7	Hungary	Estilla Mosena; Eszter Kovács	34.80	36.60	43.92	50.22	46.20	211.74
8	Georgia	Mariami Shanidze; Tekle Sharia	39.00	34.80	46.17	45.36	41.16	206.49
