= Brittany O'Brien =

Australian diver (born 1998)

Personal information
- Full name: Brittany Mae O'Brien
- Nickname: Britt
- Born: 27 May 1998 (age 28) Sydney, New South Wales, Australia
- Education: Pymble Ladies College/Macquarie University
- Height: 168 cm (5 ft 6 in) (2016)
- Weight: 55 kg (121 lb) (2016)

Sport
- Sport: Diving
- Event: Women's 10m Platform Diver
- Team: NSWIS
Medal record
Women's diving
Representing Australia
Commonwealth Games
Silver medal – second place	2022 Birmingham	1 m springboard
Universiade
Silver medal – second place	2017 Taipei	10 m synchro

Brittany Mae O'Brien (born 27 May 1998) is an Australian diver. She competed at the 2016 Rio Summer Olympics. She attended Pymble Ladies' College and graduated in 2016. She also owns a Jewellery Brand called Draco Jewellery which she launched in 2020.

== Career ==
O'Brien is a 10m platform diver. She currently trains at Sydney Olympic Aquatic Centre. Brittany was unable to qualify for the 2016 Rio Summer Olympics after placing third in the 10m platform event at the Australian Diving Championships. Brittany unexpectedly received a late call up on 30 July 2016 to compete in the 2016 Summer Olympics after Brittany Broben was forced to pull out of the event due to a shoulder injury. The result for the Rio 2016 Olympic Games had Brittany qualify for the semi-finals of the women's 10m platform and come overall 15th in the event.

She competed at the Commonwealth Games in 2018 where she came 7th in the women's 10 metre platform event and in 2022 where she won a silver medal in the women's 1 metre springboard, came 5th in the women's synchronised 3 metre springboard event alongside Esther Qin and came 9th in the women's 3 metre springboard event.

== See also ==
- Diving at the 2016 Summer Olympics – Women's 10 metre platform
- Australia at the 2016 Summer Olympics
