= Maddison Keeney =

Australian diver (born 1996)

Personal information
- Nationality: Australian
- Born: 23 May 1996 (age 30) Auckland, New Zealand
- Height: 1.65 m (5 ft 5 in)

Sport
- Country: Australia
- Sport: Diving
- Events: 1 m, 3 m, 3 m synchro
- Club: Queensland Academy of Sport
Medal record
Women's diving
Representing Australia
Olympic Games
Silver medal – second place	2024 Paris	3 m springboard
Bronze medal – third place	2016 Rio de Janeiro	3 m synchro
World Championships
Gold medal – first place	2017 Budapest	1 m springboard
Gold medal – first place	2019 Gwangju	3 m mixed synchro
Gold medal – first place	2024 Doha	3 m mixed synchro
Gold medal – first place	2025 Singapore	1 m springboard
Silver medal – second place	2023 Fukuoka	3 m mixed synchro
Silver medal – second place	2024 Doha	3 m synchro
Silver medal – second place	2025 Singapore	3 m mixed synchro
Bronze medal – third place	2019 Gwangju	3 m springboard
Bronze medal – third place	2022 Budapest	3 m synchro
Bronze medal – third place	2024 Doha	Team event
Commonwealth Games
Gold medal – first place	2022 Birmingham	3 m synchro
Gold medal – first place	2022 Birmingham	3 m springboard
Silver medal – second place	2014 Glasgow	1 m springboard
Silver medal – second place	2018 Gold Coast	3 m springboard
Silver medal – second place	2022 Birmingham	3 m mixed synchro
Bronze medal – third place	2014 Glasgow	3 m synchro
World Cup
Bronze medal – third place	2014 Shanghai	3 m synchro

Maddison Keeney (born 23 May 1996) is an Australian diver. She is a dual Olympic medallist, winning a bronze medal at the 2016 Summer Olympics in Rio de Janeiro and silver medal at the 2024 Summer Olympics in Paris. She has also won gold medals at the 2017, 2019, 2025, and 2025 World Aquatics Championships, as well as 2022 Commonwealth Games, and silver medals at the 2014, 2018 and 2022 Commonwealth Games.

== Background ==
Keeney was born in Takapuna, a suburb of Auckland, New Zealand. She grew up in Perth, Western Australia, where she attended Churchlands Senior High School. She attended the University of Queensland, graduating with a bachelor's degree in physics and computer science.

Keeney is also an avid fan of professional League of Legends esports, which was first noticed by former player and caster Marc "Caedrel" Lamont on one of his live streams on Twitch when Keeney posted a video on Caedrel's Discord server from the Olympic Village in Paris during the 2024 Summer Olympics.

== Career ==
Keeney rose to prominence in the Australian aquatic scene, when she competed at the 2014 Commonwealth Games in Glasgow, Scotland. There, she won the silver medal in the 1 m springboard event, a bronze in the 3 m synchronised springboard event with her partner Anabelle Smith and came 4th in the women's 3 metre springboard event.

At the 2015 World Aquatics Championships in Kazan, Russia, Keeney finished seventh in the 3 m springboard, fourth in mixed synchronised 3 m springboard, and twelfth in the 1 m springboard.

Keeney performed for the synchronised springboard diving, alongside Anabelle Smith, at the 2016 Summer Olympics in Rio de Janeiro. There, the pair opened with a back dive pike, scoring a score of 48.00 to share fifth place with Germany. On the third dive, they scored 72.20, slipping them to sixth place, within striking distance from bronze. They moved up one spot in the standings to fifth on 228.09 in the penultimate round, before snatching bronze in their final dive.

At the 2017 World Aquatics Championships in Budapest, Hungary, Keeney won gold in the 1m springboard.

She competed at the 2018 Commonwealth Games where she won a silver medal in the women's 3 metre springboard event and came 7th in the women's synchronised 3 metre springboard event.

Keeney was training to compete for the 2020 Summer Olympics in Tokyo, Japan. However, he games were rescheduled to 2021 as a result of the COVID-19 pandemic, and she pulled out due to an injury.

For the 2022 Commonwealth Games, contested in Birmingham, England, Keeney won a gold medal in the 3 metre synchronised springboard, scoring less than 20 points ahead of silver medallists Nur Dhabitah Sabri and Ng Yan Yee of Malaysia with a final mark of 316.53 points achieved with her partner Anabelle Smith. The following day, she won the gold medal in the 3 metre springboard, scoring 348.95 points in the final round of competition. One day later, she scored 304.02 points with partner Li Shixin in the mixed 3 metre synchronised springboard to win the silver medal.

She competed at the 2024 Summer Olympics where she came 5th in the 3 metre synchronised springboard event alongside Anabelle Smith. She later won a silver medal in the women's 3 metre springboard event, placing second behind Chen Yiwen of China.
