= Helle Tuxen =

Norwegian diver (born 2001)

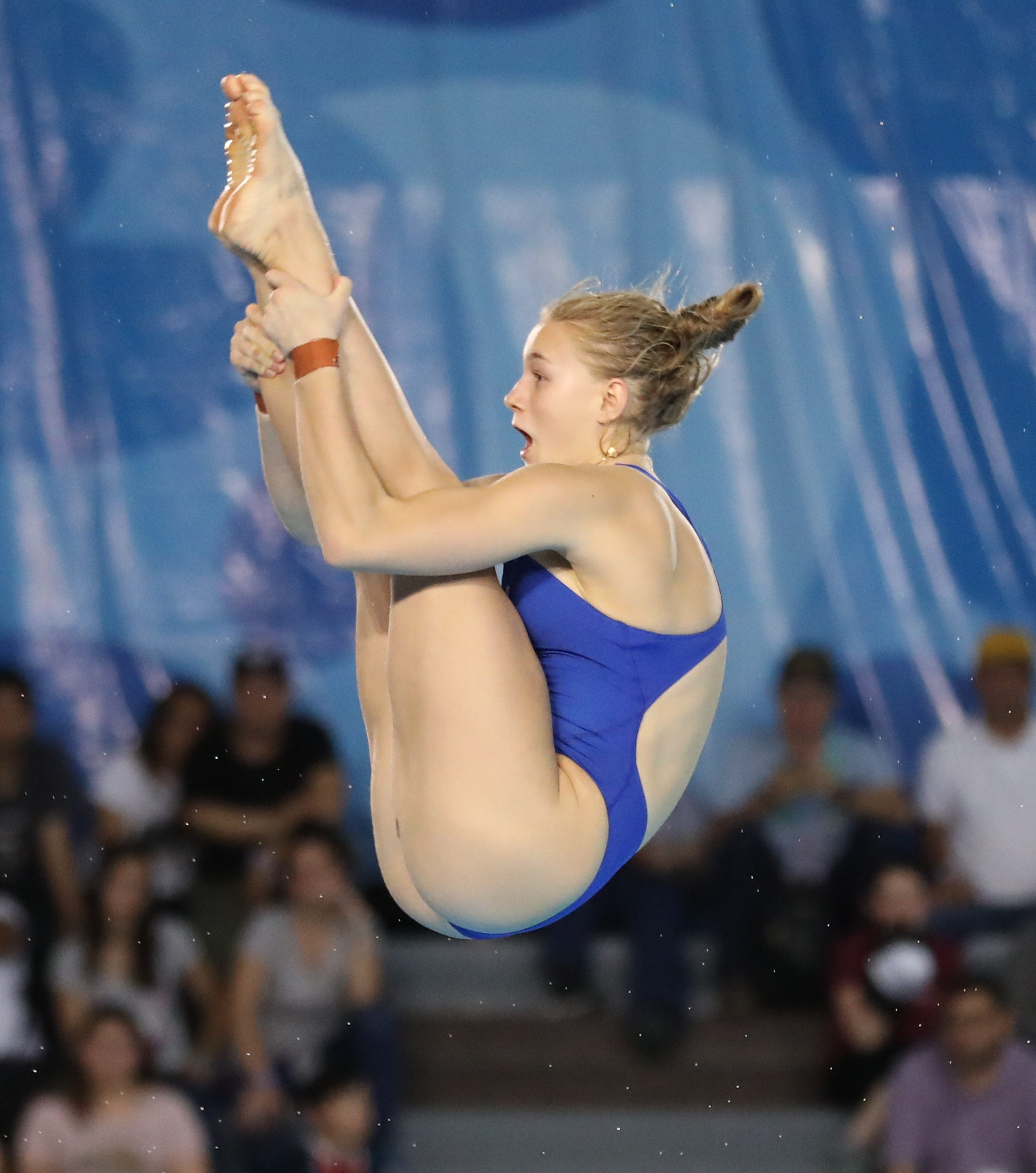
- Tuxen at 2018 Summer Youth Olympics

Personal information
- Nationality: Norway
- Born: 4 September 2001 (age 24) Tananger, Norway
- Years active: 2010-

Sport
- Country: Norway
- Sport: Diving
- Event: 3m synchronized diving
- Partner: Anne Vilde Tuxen

Achievements and titles
- Regional finals: Silver at the 2016 FINA Diving Grand Prix
Medal record
Representing Norway
European Championships
Silver medal – second place	2024 Belgrade	3 m springboard

Helle Tuxen (born 4 September 2001) is a Norwegian diver. Together with her sister Anne Vilde Tuxen, she competes in the 3m synchronized diving event, and took silver in the FINA 2016 Diving Grand Prix in Madrid.
