= Katrina Bellio =

Canadian swimmer (born 2004)

Personal information
- National team: Canada
- Born: August 1, 2004 (age 22) Mississauga, Ontario
- Height: 170 cm (5 ft 7 in)
- Weight: 54 kg (119 lb)

Sport
- Sport: Swimming
- Strokes: Freestyle
Medal record
Women's swimming
Representing Canada
World Junior Championships
Bronze medal – third place	2019 Budapest	4×200 m freestyle

Katrina Bellio (born August 1, 2004) is a Canadian competitive swimmer who specializes in the freestyle.

== Career ==
In 2019, Bellio won a bronze medal at the 2019 FINA World Junior Swimming Championships in Budapest, as part of the 4x200 women's freestyle relay.

As part of the 2021 Canadian Olympic swimming trials in Toronto, Bellio won the 1500 metre freestyle race. This qualified her for the 2020 Summer Olympics in Tokyo.

At the 2020 Olympics, Bellio participated in the first ever Olympic heat for the women's 1500 metre freestyle, and won the heat in a time of 16:24.37, which the arena announcer, and some media, reported would be recorded as the first-ever Olympic record in the event. However, the sport's governing body FINA subsequently clarified that the initial record would only be established after all five heats (with the fastest heat time ultimately being recorded by Katie Ledecky). Despite winning her heat, Bellio placed 21st overall in the heats and did not advance to the final.

In 2022, Bellio was named to Canada's World Championship and Commonwealth Games teams for the first time. On the first day of the Commonwealth Games in Birmingham, she qualified to her first senior championship final, finishing seventh in the 200 m freestyle.
