= Senri Ikuma =

Japanese diver

Personal information
- Nationality: Japanese
- Born: May 10, 2004 (age 22) Japan
- Education: Nippon Sport Science University

Sport
- Sport: Diving
Medal record
Men's diving
Representing Japan
World Aquatics Diving Grand Prix
Gold medal – first place	2025 Morgantown	Men's synchronised 3 m springboard
Asian Games
Silver medal – second place	2026 Aichi–Nagoya	Men's synchronised 3 m springboard

Senri Ikuma (Japanese: 伊熊 扇李, romanized: Ikuma Senri; born 10 May 2004) is a Japanese diver who competes in springboard events. He represents Japan in international diving competitions and is affiliated with Nippon Sport Science University.

== Career ==
Ikuma competed at the 2022 FINA World Junior Diving Championships in Montreal, Canada, where he participated in the boys' 1 metre and 3 metre springboard events. He subsequently represented Japan in senior international competitions and became a regular competitor in the men's springboard events.

In June 2025, Ikuma won the gold medal in the men's synchronised 3 metre springboard at the World Aquatics Diving Grand Prix in Morgantown, West Virginia, United States. The result was his first gold medal recorded by World Aquatics in an international senior competition.

In March 2026, Ikuma competed at the Tsubasa Japan Diving Cup in Tokyo, where he won the men's 3 metre springboard event. He also won the men's synchronised 3 metre springboard competition with Haruki Suyama.

At the 2026 Asian Games in Aichi and Nagoya, Japan, Ikuma competed in the men's 3 metre springboard and synchronised 3 metre springboard events. He finished fifth in the individual springboard event. In the synchronised event, he partnered Haruki Suyama and won the silver medal with a total of 355.56 points. The Japanese pair finished behind China's Wang Zongyuan and Zheng Jiuyuan, who scored 465.87 points. Japan Aquatics reported that the pair secured second place after scoring highly in the middle rounds of the final.
