= Margo Erlam =

Canadian diver (born 2002)

Margo Erlam OLY
Personal information
- Full name: Margo Claire Erlam
- Born: June 18, 2002 (age 24) Calgary, Alberta, Canada
Medal record
Women's diving
Representing Canada
Commonwealth Games
Bronze medal – third place	2022 Birmingham	3 m synchro springboard

Margo Claire Erlam OLY (born June 18, 2002) is a Canadian diver in the springboard (1 and 3 metre) events. Erlam is currently based out of and trains at the Saskatoon Diving Club.

== Career ==
Erlam made her national team debut at the 2017 FINA Grand Prix held in Puerto Rico. At the 2022 FINA Grand Prix stop in Calgary, Erlam and partner Mia Vallée won the gold medal in the 3 metres synchro event, in their second competition together. Erlam's strong performances in 2022 led her to be named to 2022 World Aquatics Championships team. After not winning any medals in her first two events at the Championships, Erlam finished the event with a fifth place finish in the synchro 3 m event with partner Mia Vallée.

In June 2022, Erlam was named to Canada's 2022 Commonwealth Games team. She won a bronze medal in the women's synchronised 3 metre springboard event alongside Mia Vallée, came 5th in the women's 3 metre springboard event, came 6th in the mixed synchronised 3 metre springboard event alongside Bryden Hattie and came 9th in the women's 1 metre springboard event.
