= Mia Vallée =

Canadian diver (born 2001)

Personal information
- Full name: Mia Jolie Doucet Vallée
- Born: March 22, 2001 (age 25) Beaconsfield, Quebec, Canada
Medal record
Women's diving
Representing Canada
World Championships
Silver medal – second place	2022 Budapest	3 m springboard
Bronze medal – third place	2022 Budapest	1 m springboard
Pan American Games
Silver medal – second place	2023 Santiago	1 m springboard
Silver medal – second place	2023 Santiago	3 m synchro
Commonwealth Games
Gold medal – first place	2022 Birmingham	1 m springboard
Bronze medal – third place	2022 Birmingham	3 m springboard
Bronze medal – third place	2022 Birmingham	3 m synchro

Mia Jolie Doucet Vallée (born March 22, 2001) is a Canadian diver in the springboard (1 and 3 metre) events.

== Career ==
Vallée made her national team debut at the 2016 FINA Grand Prix. At the 2022 FINA Grand Prix stop in Calgary, Vallée and partner Margo Erlam won the gold medal in the 3 metres synchro event, in their second competition together. Vallée's strong performances in 2022 led her to be named to 2022 World Aquatics Championships team. At the World Championships, Vallée won bronze in the one metre individual springboard event. Later, Vallée followed the bronze medal with a silver medal finish in the three metre individual springboard event. Vallée finished the event with a fifth place finish in the synchro 3 m event with partner Margo Erlam.

In June 2022, Vallée was named to Canada's 2022 Commonwealth Games team. She won a gold medal in the 1 metre springboard event and bronze medals in the women's 3 metre springboard event and women's synchronised 3 metre springboard event alongside Margo Erlam. Vallée competes for the Miami Hurricanes on their swim and dive team. As a junior she was the 2022 NCAA national champion on the 1m springboard.
