= Haruki Suyama =

Japanese diver

Personal information
- Nationality: Japanese
- Born: March 9, 1998 (age 28) Shimane Prefecture, Japan
- Education: Shimane University
- Height: 175 cm (5 ft 9 in)

Sport
- Sport: Diving
Medal record
Men's diving
Representing Japan
World Aquatics Diving World Cup
Bronze medal – third place	2023 Montreal	Men's synchronised 3 m springboard
Asian Games
Silver medal – second place	2026 Aichi–Nagoya	Men's synchronised 3 m springboard

Haruki Suyama (Japanese: 須山 晴貴; born 9 March 1998) is a Japanese diver who specialises in springboard diving. He has represented Japan at the World Aquatics Championships, the World Aquatics Diving World Cup and the Asian Games.

== Career ==
Suyama studied at Shimane University and has been affiliated with the Japan Swimming Promotion Association's Utsunomiya organisation.

In 2017, Suyama competed at the Summer Universiade in Taipei, participating in the men's 1 metre and 3 metre springboard events. He later represented Japan at the 2019 Summer Universiade in Naples, Italy, and the 2022 World Aquatics Championships in Budapest, Hungary.

Suyama competed at the 2022 Asian Games in Hangzhou, China, where he finished fourth in the men's synchronised 3 metre springboard event.

In May 2023, Suyama won the bronze medal in men's synchronised 3 metre springboard at the World Aquatics Diving World Cup in Montreal, Canada, with a score of 410.07 points. Later that year, he competed at the World Aquatics Championships in Fukuoka, Japan, finishing seventh in the same event.

Suyama participated in the 2024 World Aquatics Championships in Doha, Qatar, where he finished 19th in the men's 3 metre springboard event. In 2025, he competed at the World Aquatics Championships in Singapore and the Tsubasa Japan Diving Cup, where he won the men's synchronised 3 metre springboard event with Senri Ikuma.

At the 2026 Asian Games in Aichi and Nagoya, Japan, Suyama partnered Senri Ikuma in the men's synchronised 3 metre springboard event. The Japanese pair scored 355.56 points to win the silver medal behind China's Wang Zongyuan and Zheng Jiuyuan, who scored 465.87 points. Japan Aquatics reported that the pair secured second place after scoring highly in the middle rounds of the final.
