= Rosalie Boissonneault =

Canadian synchronized swimmer

Personal information
- Born: 4 July 2003 (age 23) Drummondville, Quebec, Canada

Sport
- Country: Canada
- Sport: Artistic swimming
- Club: Montréal Synchro

Rosalie Boissonneault (born 4 July 2003) is a Canadian artistic swimmer. In 2020, Boissonneault joined the national senior team in 2020.

== Career ==
In May 2021, Boissonneault finished in eighth place at in the solo event at a virtual World Cup stop. In June 2021, Boissonneault was named to the Canadian Olympic team. At the age of 17, she was the youngest person named to the team.
