= Qin Qian (erhu player) =

Chinese musician (born 1964)

- 覃茜
- Born: 1964 (age 60–61); China
- Occupation: Musician
- Website: www.qinqianerhu.com

Qin Qian (覃茜). (born 1964) is a Chinese musician who performs on the erhu.

Qin was born in Guangxi, China. She completed her studies at the Guangxi Arts College and has performed as soloist with the Guangxi Symphony Orchestra in the city of Nanning. Her students have won prominent competitions, and Qin was awarded with the Outstanding Teacher Award at the Princeton International Chinese Music Competition in 2012 and 2014.

She now lives in Philadelphia, Pennsylvania, and performs and teaches music there.

In 2024, Qian was providing weekly lessons at Jin Se Nian Hua Adult Day Care Center in Chinatown.

== Publications ==
"A Romantic Musical Journey" (CD Recording)

"My Dreams Soar With Music" (Book published in Chinese)

"A Musical Journey in America" (Book published in Chinese)
