= Abby Dunford =

Canadian-American swimmer

Personal information
- Nickname: Abalabadingdong
- Nationality: Canada
- Born: January 2, 2006 (age 20) Zachary, Louisiana, United States
- Height: 5 ft 6 in (168 cm)

Sport
- Sport: Swimming
- Strokes: freestyle
- Club: Sandpipers of Nevada; Cascade Swimming (former); Tiger Aquatics (former); Louisiana Swimming (former); Crawfish Aquatics (former)
- Coach: Ron Aitken; Jayme Cramer (former)

Abby Dunford (born January 2, 2006) is a Canadian–American swimmer, currently swimming for Las Vegas-based swim team Sandpipers of Nevada. She swam in the 2022 World Aquatics Championships in the women's 1,500m preliminary heats, finishing 17th, not qualifying for the final. She would also swim the open water 5km and 10km events, finishing 31st and 38th respectively. She is also scheduled to swim at the 2022 Commonwealth Games.

== Career ==
=== Early career ===
In December 2017, while Dunford was 11 years old and swimming for Tiger Aquatics, she would break the 11–12 girls Louisiana state record, which had stood for 41 years, for the 500m freestyle by more than a second with a time of 5:06.24. She would go on to say "I was really shocked. I really wanted the record. It was great. I was so happy."

=== 2021 ===
In 2021, Dunford aimed to compete for Canada at the 2020 Summer Olympics in the women's 1,500m freestyle, but came up short of the Olympics qualifying time, finishing six seconds behind. According to Dunford, COVID-19 protocols during the pandemic affected her training when she returned to Canada.

=== 2022: World Aquatics Championships ===
At the Canadian Swimming Trials 2022, the Canadian qualifying event for 2022 World Aquatics Championships, she would win the gold medal in the event, earning a time of 16:20.26, knocking her personal best time by 18 seconds.

== Personal life ==
Dunford, asides from swimming, also does track and field. She is currently living with her mother, Lianne Crawford.
