= Emily Martin (diver) =

British diver

Personal information
- Born: March 4, 2001 (age 25) Southampton, England
Medal record
Women's diving
Representing England
Commonwealth Games
Bronze medal – third place	2022 Birmingham	10 metre platform

Emily Martin (born 4 March 2001) is a British diver in the springboard 10 metre platform event.

== Career ==
Emily Martin made her national team debut at the 2016 FINA Grand Prix at the age of 16. In June 2022, Vallée was named to England's 2022 Commonwealth Games team. She won a bronze medal in the 10 m platform event.
