= Amy Rollinson =

British diver (born 2004)

Personal information
- Full name: Amy Elisabeth Rollinson
- Born: 18 June 2004 (age 22) Luton, England
- Height: 1.63 m (5 ft 4 in)
- Weight: 61 kg (134 lb)
Medal record
Women's diving
Representing Great Britain
European Games
Gold medal – first place	2023 Kraków-Małopolska	3 m synchro
European Championships
Gold medal – first place	2024 Belgrade	3 m synchro
European Diving Championships
Gold medal – first place	2023 Rzeszów	3 m synchro
Bronze medal – third place	2025 Antalya	3 m synchro
Representing England
Commonwealth Games
Bronze medal – third place	2022 Birmingham	1 m springboard

Amy Elisabeth Rollinson (born 18 June 2004) is a British diver in the springboard (1 and 3 metre) events.

== Career ==
Amy Rollinson made her national team debut at the 2021 FINA Grand Prix at the age of 16. In June 2022, Rollinson was named to England's 2022 Commonwealth Games team. She won a bronze medal in the one metre springboard event and came 4th in the women's synchronised three metre springboard alongside Desharne Bent-Ashmeil.
