= Anabelle Smith =

Australian diver (born 1993)

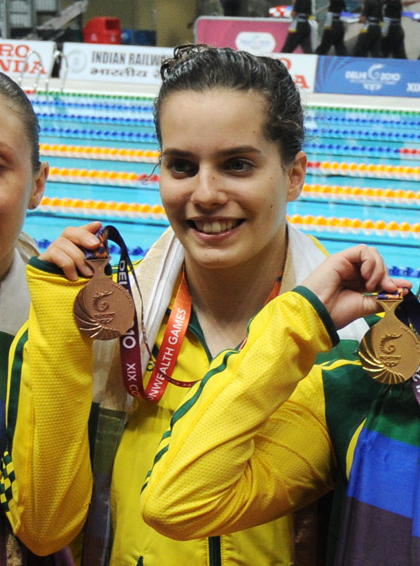
- Smith at the 2010 Commonwealth Games

Personal information
- Full name: Anabelle Luce Smith
- Born: 3 February 1993 (age 33) Malvern, Victoria, Australia
- Height: 159 cm (5 ft 3 in)
- Weight: 55 kg (121 lb)

Sport
- Country: Australia
- Sport: Diving
- Club: Gannets Diving Club; Victorian Institute of Sport
- Coached by: Hui Tong
Medal record
Representing Australia
Olympic Games
Bronze medal – third place	2016 Rio de Janeiro	3 m synchro
World Championships
Silver medal – second place	2024 Doha	3 m synchro
Bronze medal – third place	2011 Shanghai	3 m synchro
Bronze medal – third place	2022 Budapest	3 m synchro
Commonwealth Games
Gold medal – first place	2022 Birmingham	3 m synchro
Bronze medal – third place	2010 Delhi	10 m synchro
Bronze medal – third place	2014 Glasgow	3 m synchro
World Cup
Bronze medal – third place	2014 Shanghai	3 m synchro

Anabelle Luce Smith (born 3 February 1993) is an Australian diver. She is the 2022 Commonwealth Games champion in the 3 metre synchronized springboard. She competed in the 3 m springboard synchronized event at the 2012, 2016 and 2020 Summer Olympics. She won a bronze medal in 2016, and was placed fifth in 2012.

== Diving ==
Smith competes in the 3 m springboard and 10 m platform synchro events. She has a diving scholarship with the Australian Institute of Sport and is a member of Gannets Diving Club. She trains at the Brisbane Aquatic Centre. She competes with Sharleen Stratton, following the retirement of her former partner Briony Cole.

Smith represented Australia at the 2010 Commonwealth Games, where she earned a bronze medal in the 10 m synchro platform with Cole. Competing with Stratton she won a bronze medal in the 3 m synchro springboard at the 2011 World Aquatics Championships with a score of 306.90. At the 2012 FINA Diving Grand Prix in Madrid she and Stratton finished second in the 3 m springboard synchro, scoring 293.58.

Before the 2014 Commonwealth Games, Smith severely injured the middle finger on her right hand, when it was squashed by metal plates of a weight training machine. She returned to diving after three months and wore a hand brace for another five months. She did not fully recover the mobility in that finger.

Smith qualified for the Tokyo 2020 Olympics and competed in the Women's 3-metre springboard. She managed to get to the semi-finals.

At the 2022 Commonwealth Games, held in Birmingham, England, Smith and her partner Maddison Keeney won the gold medal in the 3 metre synchronized springboard with a score of 316.53 points, which was less than 20 points ahead of silver medalists Ng Yan Yee and Nur Dhabitah Sabri of Malaysia.

She competed at the 2024 Summer Olympics where she came 5th in the 3 metre springboard event alongside Maddison Keeney.

== Personal life ==
Smith is of maternal Mauritian ancestry. She originally aspired to become a paediatrician, but abandoned the career path after realising she did not have the emotional control to work with sick children.
