= Syafiq Puteh =

Malaysian diver (born 1995)

Muhammad Syafiq Puteh
Personal information
- Nationality: Malaysian
- Born: 20 October 1995 (age 30) Perak, Malaysia
- Height: 170 cm (5 ft 7 in)

Sport
- Country: Malaysia
- Sport: Diving
Medal record
Men's diving
Representing Malaysia
Asian Games
Bronze medal – third place	2022 Hangzhou	3 m synchro
Commonwealth Games
Silver medal – second place	2022 Birmingham	3 m synchro
Bronze medal – third place	2022 Birmingham	3 m mixed synchro
Asian Championships
Silver medal – second place	2025 Ahmedabad	1 m springboard
Silver medal – second place	2025 Ahmedabad	3 m synchro
Southeast Asian Games
Gold medal – first place	2021 Hanoi	3 m springboard
Gold medal – first place	2023 Phnom Penh	3 m springboard

Muhammad Syafiq bin Puteh (born 20 October 1995) is a Malaysian diver. He competes in 1m springboard, 3m springboard, mixed synchronized diving 3m, and synchronized diving 3m.
