= Desharne Bent-Ashmeil =

British diver (born 2004)

Personal information
- Full name: Desharne Bent-Ashmeil
- Born: 2 September 2004 (age 21) Croydon, England
Medal record
Women's diving
Representing Great Britain
European Games
Gold medal – first place	2023 Kraków-Małopolska	3 m synchro
European Championships
Gold medal – first place	2024 Belgrade	3 m springboard
Gold medal – first place	2024 Belgrade	3 m synchro
Gold medal – first place	2024 Belgrade	3 m mixed synchro
Bronze medal – third place	2026 Paris	1 m springboard
European Diving Championships
Gold medal – first place	2023 Rzeszów	3 m synchro
Bronze medal – third place	2025 Antalya	3 m synchro
Bronze medal – third place	2025 Antalya	3 m mixed synchro

Desharne Bent-Ashmeil (born 2 September 2004) is a British athlete who competes in diving. She won a silver medal in the 2022 FINA World Junior Diving Championships. She won a gold medal in the 3m synchro springboard event at the 2023 European Games. She won three gold medals at the 2024 European Aquatics Championships across all three 3 m springboard events.

== International awards ==
European Games
Year	Place	Medal	Event	Ref.
2023	Rzeszów (Poland)	Gold	3m synchro springboard	
European Championship
Year	Place	Medal	Event	Ref.
2024	Belgrade (Serbia)	Gold	3m springboard	
2024	Belgrade (Serbia)	Gold	3m synchronized springboard	
2024	Belgrade (Serbia)	Gold	3m mixed synchro springboard	
