= Maldives at the 2025 World Aquatics Championships =

- Flag of Maldives
- World Aquatics code: MDV
- National federation: Swimming Association of Maldives
- Website: swimming.org.mv

in Singapore
- Competitors: 4 in 1 sport
- Medals: Gold 0 Silver 0 Bronze 0 Total 0

World Aquatics Championships appearances
- 1973; 1975; 1978; 1982; 1986; 1991; 1994; 1998; 2001; 2003; 2005; 2007; 2009; 2011; 2013; 2015; 2017; 2019; 2022; 2023; 2024; 2025

Maldives is competing at the 2025 World Aquatics Championships in Singapore from 11 July to 3 August 2025.

== Competitors ==
The following is the list of competitors in the Championships.

Sport	Men	Women	Total
Swimming	2	2	4
Total	2	2	4

== Swimming ==
Men

Athlete	Event	Heat		Semifinal		Final	
Athlete	Event	Time	Rank	Time	Rank	Time	Rank
Mohamed Aan Hussain	50 m freestyle	23.81 NR	67	Did not advance			
Mohamed Aan Hussain	100 m freestyle	53.80 NR	78	Did not advance			
Mohamed Rihan Shiham	200 m butterfly	2:25.20 NR	36	Did not advance			
Mohamed Rihan Shiham	400 m medley	5:15.03	32	Did not advance			

Women

Athlete	Event	Heat		Semifinal		Final	
Athlete	Event	Time	Rank	Time	Rank	Time	Rank
Meral Ayn Latheef	100 m butterfly	1:16.73	58	Did not advance			
Meral Ayn Latheef	200 m medley	2:44.34 NR	37	Did not advance			
Amna Thazkiyah Mirsaad	100 m freestyle	1:04.04	72	Did not advance			
Amna Thazkiyah Mirsaad	100 m backstroke	1:13.49 NR	56	Did not advance			

Mixed

Athlete	Event	Heat		Final	
Athlete	Event	Time	Rank	Time	Rank
Mohamed Aan Hussain; Meral Ayn Latheef; Amna Thazkiyah Mirsaad; Mohamed Rihan Shiham	4 × 100 m freestyle relay	4:04.21	31	Did not advance	
Mohamed Aan Hussain; Meral Ayn Latheef; Amna Thazkiyah Mirsaad; Mohamed Rihan Shiham	4 × 100 m medley relay	4:40.23	35	Did not advance	
