= Swimming at the 2025 World Aquatics Championships – Men's 200 metre butterfly =

Men's 200 metre butterfly at the 2025 World Aquatics Championships
- Venue: World Aquatics Championships Arena
- Location: Singapore Sports Hub, Kallang, Singapore
- Dates: 29 July (heats and semifinals); 30 July (final)
- Competitors: 37 from 32 nations
- Winning time: 1:51.87

Medalists
gold medal	Luca Urlando	United States
silver medal	Krzysztof Chmielewski	Poland
bronze medal	Harrison Turner	Australia

The men's 200 metre butterfly event at the 2025 World Aquatics Championships was held from 29 to 30 July 2025 at the World Aquatics Championships Arena at the Singapore Sports Hub in Kallang, Singapore.

== Background ==
France’s Léon Marchand, the 2024 Olympic champion, and Hungary's Kristóf Milák, the world record holder, both withdrew from the event in the lead-up to the championships. The United States’ Luca Urlando, who had the fastest qualifying time among entrants, was in contention for gold after finishing 17th at the Olympics. Canada’s Ilya Kharun, the Olympic bronze medalist, was seeded second out of the competing qualifiers. Other podium threats included Poland’s Krzysztof Chmielewski, fourth at the Olympics with 1:53.90, and Japan’s Genki Terakado, ranked sixth worldwide in 2025 with 1:54.73.

== Qualification ==
Each National Federation was permitted to enter a maximum of two qualified athletes in each individual event, but they could do so only if both of them had attained the "A" standard qualification time. For this event, the "A" standard qualification time was 1:56.51. Federations could enter one athlete into the event if they met the "B" standard qualification time. For this event, the "B" standard qualification time was 2:00.59. Athletes could also enter the event if they had met an "A" or "B" standard in a different event and their Federation had not entered anyone else. Additional considerations applied to Federations who had few swimmers enter through the standard qualification times. Federations in this category could at least enter two men and two women to the competition, all of whom could enter into up to two events.

Top 10 fastest qualification times (Note: Only including swimmers who were on the start list for this event)
Swimmer	Country	Time	Competition
Luca Urlando	United States	1:52.37	2025 TYR Pro Swim Series (Sacramento)
Ilya Kharun	Canada	1:52.80	2024 Summer Olympics
Carson Foster	United States	1:53.70	2025 United States Championships
Krzysztof Chmielewski	Poland	1:53.90	2024 Summer Olympics
Genki Terakado	Japan	1:54.07	2024 Japanese Championships
Martin Espernberger	Austria	1:54.17	2024 Summer Olympics
Alberto Razzetti	Italy	1:54.51	2024 Summer Olympics
Michal Chmielewski	Poland	1:54.64	2024 Summer Olympics
Federico Burdisso	Italy	1:54.76	2025 Sette Colli Trophy
Harrison Turner	Australia	1:54.90	2025 Australian Trials

== Records ==
Prior to the competition, the existing world and championship records were as follows.

World record	Kristóf Milák (HUN)	1:50.34	Budapest, Hungary	21 June 2022
Competition record	Kristóf Milák (HUN)	1:50.34	Budapest, Hungary	21 June 2022

== Heats ==
The heats took place on 29 July at 10:47.

Rank	Heat	Lane	Swimmer	Nation	Time	Notes
1	4	4	Luca Urlando	United States	1:52.71	Q
2	4	5	Krzysztof Chmielewski	Poland	1:52.89	Q, NR
3	3	4	Ilya Kharun	Canada	1:53.74	Q
4	4	2	Chen Juner	China	1:54.54	Q
4	4	3	Alberto Razzetti	Italy	1:54.54	Q
6	3	5	Genki Terakado	Japan	1:54.64	Q
7	3	3	Michał Chmielewski	Poland	1:54.68	Q
8	4	6	Harrison Turner	Australia	1:54.74	Q
9	3	2	So Ogata	Japan	1:55.37	Q
10	2	5	Martin Espernberger	Austria	1:55.45	Q
11	4	7	Richárd Márton	Hungary	1:55.51	Q
12	2	4	Carson Foster	United States	1:55.68	Q
13	2	3	Federico Burdisso	Italy	1:56.08	Q
14	3	7	Edward Mildred	Great Britain	1:56.17	Q
15	3	6	Kim Min-seop	South Korea	1:56.34	Q
16	2	1	Lewis Clareburt	New Zealand	1:56.35	Q
17	2	2	Arbidel González	Spain	1:56.48	
18	3	1	Denys Kesil	Ukraine	1:56.51	
19	2	6	Xu Fang	China	1:56.99	
20	3	8	Jack Cassin	Ireland	1:57.08	
21	4	0	Casper Puggaard	Denmark	1:58.58	
22	3	0	Marius Toscan	Switzerland	1:58.60	
23	3	9	Erick Gordillo	Guatemala	1:59.23	
24	4	9	Sajan Prakash	India	1:59.33	
25	2	7	Petar Mitsin	Bulgaria	1:59.37	
26	4	8	Samuel Kostal	Slovakia	1:59.42	
27	1	5	Raekwon Jibril Noel	Guyana	1:59.89	NR
28	2	8	Héctor Ruvalcaba	Mexico	2:01.66	
29	2	0	Ramil Valizada	Azerbaijan	2:02.14	
30	1	6	Xavier Ventura	El Salvador	2:02.86	
31	1	4	Belhassen Ben Miled	Tunisia	2:03.17	
32	1	3	Isak Brisenfeldt	Faroe Islands	2:04.17	
33	1	1	Victor Ah Yong	Mauritius	2:07.95	
34	2	9	Navaphat Wongcharoen	Thailand	2:08.24	
35	1	2	Mohammad Al-Otaibi	Kuwait	2:11.76	
36	1	7	Mohamed Rihan Shiham	Maldives	2:25.20	NR
	4	1	Apostolos Siskos	Greece	Disqualified	

== Semifinals ==
The semifinals took place on 29 July at 20:30.

Rank	Heat	Lane	Swimmer	Nation	Time	Notes
1	2	4	Luca Urlando	United States	1:52.84	Q
2	1	4	Krzysztof Chmielewski	Poland	1:53.61	Q
3	1	5	Chen Juner	China	1:54.02	Q, NR
4	1	7	Carson Foster	United States	1:54.30	Q
5	2	5	Ilya Kharun	Canada	1:54.43	Q
6	2	3	Alberto Razzetti	Italy	1:54.47	Q
7	2	1	Federico Burdisso	Italy	1:54.87	Q
8	1	6	Harrison Turner	Australia	1:54.94	Q
9	1	2	Martin Espernberger	Austria	1:55.18	
10	1	8	Lewis Clareburt	New Zealand	1:55.24	
11	1	3	Genki Terakado	Japan	1:55.30	
11	2	6	Michał Chmielewski	Poland	1:55.30	
12	2	2	So Ogata	Japan	1:55.42	
14	2	7	Richárd Márton	Hungary	1:55.80	
15	1	1	Edward Mildred	Great Britain	1:56.13	
16	2	8	Kim Min-seop	South Korea	1:57.35	

== Final ==
The final took place on 30 July at 19:54.

Rank	Lane	Name	Nationality	Time	Notes
1st place, gold medalist(s)	4	Luca Urlando	United States	1:51.87	
2nd place, silver medalist(s)	5	Krzysztof Chmielewski	Poland	1:52.64	NR
3rd place, bronze medalist(s)	8	Harrison Turner	Australia	1:54.17	NR
4	2	Ilya Kharun	Canada	1:54.34	
5	6	Carson Foster	United States	1:54.62	
6	7	Alberto Razzetti	Italy	1:54.85	
7	3	Chen Juner	China	1:55.25	
8	1	Federico Burdisso	Italy	1:55.27	
