= Maldives at the 2022 World Aquatics Championships =

- Flag of Maldives
- FINA code: MDV
- National federation: Swimming Association of Maldives
- Website: www.swimmaldives.org.mv

in Budapest, Hungary
- Competitors: 4 in 1 sport
- Medals: Gold 0 Silver 0 Bronze 0 Total 0

World Aquatics Championships appearances
- 1973; 1975; 1978; 1982; 1986; 1991; 1994; 1998; 2001; 2003; 2005; 2007; 2009; 2011; 2013; 2015; 2017; 2019; 2022; 2023; 2024

The Maldives competed at the 2022 World Aquatics Championships in Budapest, Hungary from 17 June to 3 July.

== Swimming ==
The Maldives entered four swimmers.

Men

Athlete	Event	Heat		Semifinal		Final	
Athlete	Event	Time	Rank	Time	Rank	Time	Rank
Mohamed Aan Hussain	50 m backstroke	29.57	47	did not advance			
Mohamed Aan Hussain	100 m backstroke	1:05.77	47	did not advance			
Mubal Azzam Ibrahim	200 m butterfly	2:36.74	41	did not advance			
Mubal Azzam Ibrahim	400 m medley	5:14.91	30	—		did not advance	

Women

Athlete	Event	Heat		Semifinal		Final	
Athlete	Event	Time	Rank	Time	Rank	Time	Rank
Hamna Ahmed	50 m freestyle	30.61	71	did not advance			
Hamna Ahmed	50 m backstroke	34.53	38	did not advance			
Aishath Sausan	100 m backstroke	1:18.76	43	did not advance			
Aishath Sausan	200 m backstroke	2:53.55	23	did not advance			

Mixed

Athlete	Event	Heat		Final	
Athlete	Event	Time	Rank	Time	Rank
Hamna Ahmed; Mohamed Aan Hussain; Mubal Azzam Ibrahim; Aishath Sausan	4×100 m freestyle relay	4:18.44	26	did not advance	
Hamna Ahmed; Mohamed Aan Hussain; Mubal Azzam Ibrahim; Aishath Sausan	4×100 m medley relay	4:58.06	28	did not advance	
