= Swimming at the 2024 World Aquatics Championships – Men's 200 metre butterfly =

International aquatic sporting competition

Men's 200 metre butterfly at the Swimming at the 2024 World Aquatics Championships
- Venue: Aspire Dome
- Location: Doha, Qatar
- Dates: 13 February (heats and semifinals); 14 February (final)
- Competitors: 39 from 36 nations
- Winning time: 1:53.88

Medalists
gold medal	Tomoru Honda	Japan
silver medal	Alberto Razzetti	Italy
bronze medal	Martin Espernberger	Austria

The Men's 200 metre butterfly competition at the 2024 World Aquatics Championships was held on 13 and 14 February 2024.

== Qualification ==
Each National Federation was permitted to enter a maximum of two qualified athletes in each individual event, but only if both of them had attained the "A" standard qualification time at approved qualifying events. For this event, the "A" standard qualification time was 1:56.71 . Federations could enter one athlete into the event if they met the "B" standard qualification time. For this event, the "B" standard qualification time was 2:00.79. Athletes could also enter the event if they had met an "A" or "B" standard in a different event and their Federation had not entered anyone else. Additional considerations applied to Federations who had few swimmers enter through the standard qualification times. Federations in this category could at least enter two men and two women into the competition, all of whom could enter into up to two events.

== Records ==
Prior to the competition, the existing world and championship records were as follows.

World record	Kristóf Milák (HUN)	1:50.34	Budapest, Hungary	21 June 2022
Competition record	Kristóf Milák (HUN)	1:50.34	Budapest, Hungary	21 June 2022

== Results ==
=== Heats ===
The heats were started on 13 February at 10:04.

Rank	Heat	Lane	Name	Nationality	Time	Notes
1	5	7	Kregor Zirk	Estonia	1:55.58	Q, NR
2	3	2	Lewis Clareburt	New Zealand	1:56.10	Q
3	3	3	Zach Harting	United States	1:56.12	Q
4	5	5	Martin Espernberger	Austria	1:56.26	Q
5	4	4	Krzysztof Chmielewski	Poland	1:56.37	Q
6	5	6	Matthew Sates	South Africa	1:56.40	Q
7	3	5	Alberto Razzetti	Italy	1:56.53	Q
8	3	4	Richárd Márton	Hungary	1:56.54	Q
9	5	4	Tomoru Honda	Japan	1:56.56	Q
10	4	5	Michał Chmielewski	Poland	1:56.83	Q
11	5	3	Arbidel González	Spain	1:57.20	Q
12	4	6	Denys Kesil	Ukraine	1:57.42	Q
13	3	7	Ondřej Gemov	Czech Republic	1:57.45	Q
14	2	0	Max Litchfield	Great Britain	1:57.48	Q
14	4	3	Federico Burdisso	Italy	1:57.48	Q
16	3	6	Nao Horomura	Japan	1:57.52	SO
16	4	7	Petar Mitsin	Bulgaria	1:57.52	SO
18	4	9	Abdalla Nasr	Egypt	1:57.85	NR
19	5	1	Park Jung-hun	South Korea	1:58.29	
20	3	1	Matheus Gonche	Brazil	1:58.79	
21	3	0	Marius Toscan	Switzerland	1:58.99	
22	4	1	Héctor Ruvalcaba	Mexico	1:59.08	
23	4	2	Wang Xizhe	China	1:59.32	
24	4	0	Raben Dommann	Canada	1:59.45	
25	5	9	Navaphat Wongcharoen	Thailand	1:59.78	
26	4	8	Samuel Kostal	Slovakia	1:59.90	
27	2	5	Apostolos Papastamos	Greece	2:00.56	
28	5	8	Erick Gordillo	Guatemala	2:01.75	
29	2	4	Diego Balbi	Peru	2:01.91	
30	3	9	David Arias	Colombia	2:02.32	
31	2	6	Simon Bachmann	Seychelles	2:03.31	NR
32	2	2	Nika Tchitchiashvili	Georgia	2:03.41	
33	2	3	Xavier Ventura	El Salvador	2:03.87	
34	1	1	Maxim Skazobtsov	Kazakhstan	2:05.49	
35	5	0	Ramil Valizade	Azerbaijan	2:05.58	
36	2	7	Isaiah Aleksenko	Northern Mariana Islands	2:10.17	
37	2	8	Clinton Opute	Nigeria	2:13.83	
38	1	3	Ahmed Theibich	Bahrain	2:18.46	
39	1	2	Siraj Ai Sharif	Libya	2:21.88	
–	2	1	Gerald Hernández	Nicaragua	Did not start	
–	3	8	Yeziel Morales	Puerto Rico	Did not start	
–	5	2	Chad le Clos	South Africa	Did not start	

==== Swim-off ====
The swim-off were started on 13 February at 11:11.

Rank	Lane	Name	Nationality	Time	Notes
1	5	Petar Mitsin	Bulgaria	1:56.91	Q
2	4	Nao Horomura	Japan	1:57.46	

=== Semifinals ===
The semifinals were held on 13 February at 20:33.

Rank	Heat	Lane	Name	Nationality	Time	Notes
1	2	6	Alberto Razzetti	Italy	1:55.09	Q
2	2	2	Tomoru Honda	Japan	1:55.20	Q
3	1	2	Michał Chmielewski	Poland	1:55.38	Q
4	1	5	Martin Espernberger	Austria	1:55.40	Q
5	2	4	Kregor Zirk	Estonia	1:55.64	Q
6	1	4	Lewis Clareburt	New Zealand	1:55.82	Q
7	1	3	Matthew Sates	South Africa	1:55.88	Q
8	1	6	Richárd Márton	Hungary	1:56.04	Q
9	2	8	Federico Burdisso	Italy	1:56.68	
10	2	7	Arbidel González	Spain	1:56.77	
11	2	5	Zach Harting	United States	1:56.81	
12	1	1	Max Litchfield	Great Britain	1:56.93	
13	1	7	Denys Kesil	Ukraine	1:57.67	
14	1	8	Petar Mitsin	Bulgaria	1:57.77	
15	2	1	Ondřej Gemov	Czech Republic	1:58.34	
	2	3	Krzysztof Chmielewski	Poland	Disqualified	

=== Final ===
The final was started on 14 February at 19:53.

Rank	Lane	Name	Nationality	Time	Notes
1st place, gold medalist(s)	5	Tomoru Honda	Japan	1:53.88	
2nd place, silver medalist(s)	4	Alberto Razzetti	Italy	1:54.65	
3rd place, bronze medalist(s)	6	Martin Espernberger	Austria	1:55.16	
4	3	Michał Chmielewski	Poland	1:55.36	
5	2	Kregor Zirk	Estonia	1:55.48	NR
6	8	Richárd Márton	Hungary	1:55.76	
7	7	Lewis Clareburt	New Zealand	1:55.86	
8	1	Matthew Sates	South Africa	1:57.23	

== Sources ==
- "Competition Regulations" (PDF). World Aquatics. Archived (PDF) from the original on 15 February 2026.
