= Swimming at the 2024 European Aquatics Championships – Men's 200 metre butterfly =

Men's 200 metre butterfly at the 2024 European Aquatics Championships
- Venue: Sports Centre Milan Gale Muškatirović
- Dates: 21 June (heats and semifinals); 22 June (final)
- Competitors: 25 from 18 nations
- Winning time: 1:54.43

Medalists
gold medal	Kristóf Milák	Hungary
silver medal	Krzysztof Chmielewski	Poland
bronze medal	Michał Chmielewski	Poland

The Men's 200 metre butterfly competition of the 2024 European Aquatics Championships was held on 21 and 22 June 2024.

== Records ==
Prior to the competition, the existing world, European and championship records were as follows.

	Name	Nationality	Time	Location	Date
World record European record	Kristóf Milák	Hungary	1:50.34	Budapest	21 June 2022
Championship record	Kristóf Milák	Hungary	1:51.10	Budapest	19 May 2021

== Results ==
=== Heats ===
The heats were started on 21 June at 09:59.
Qualification Rules: The 16 fastest from the heats qualify to the semifinals.

Rank	Heat	Lane	Name	Nationality	Time	Notes
1	2	4	Krzysztof Chmielewski	Poland	1:55.65	Q
2	3	4	Kristóf Milák	Hungary	1:55.71	Q
3	1	4	Richárd Márton	Hungary	1:56.44	Q
4	3	5	Michał Chmielewski	Poland	1:56.51	Q
5	3	3	Polat Uzer Turnalı	Turkey	1:56.76	Q
6	1	3	Balázs Holló	Hungary	1:57.02	
7	2	3	Ondřej Gemov	Czech Republic	1:57.75	Q
8	2	5	Kregor Zirk	Estonia	1:58.17	Q
9	2	6	Damian Chrzanowski	Poland	1:58.46	
10	3	2	Apostolos Siskos	Greece	1:58.49	Q
11	3	7	Marius Toscan	Switzerland	1:58.57	Q
12	1	2	Joshua Gammon	Great Britain	1:58.85	Q
13	3	6	Adrian Jaśkiewicz	Poland	1:59.02	
14	1	7	Jack Cassin	Ireland	1:59.05	Q
15	2	7	Ramil Valizade	Azerbaijan	1:59.20	Q
16	1	5	David Thomasberger	Germany	1:59.25	Q
17	3	1	Heorhii Lukashev	Ukraine	1:59.65	Q
18	1	6	Sebastian Lunak	Czech Republic	2:00.65	Q
19	1	1	Edward Mildred	Great Britain	2:01.82	Q
20	2	2	Vili Sivec	Croatia	2:02.02	
21	3	8	Inbar Ono Danziger	Israel	2:02.36	
22	3	0	Kenan Dracic	Bosnia and Herzegovina	2:03.78	
23	2	1	Richard Nagy	Slovakia	2:04.19	
24	1	8	Jaka Pušnik	Slovenia	2:04.74	
25	1	8	Ognjen Pilipović	Serbia	2:05.49	

=== Semifinals ===
The semifinals were started on 21 June at 19:27.
Qualification Rules: The first 2 competitors of each semifinal and the remaining fastest (up to a total of 8 qualified competitors) from the semifinals advance to the final.

Rank	Heat	Lane	Name	Nationality	Time	Notes
1	1	4	Kristóf Milák	Hungary	1:54.64	Q
2	2	4	Krzysztof Chmielewski	Poland	1:55.12	Q
3	1	5	Michał Chmielewski	Poland	1:55.76	Q
4	2	5	Richárd Márton	Hungary	1:56.05	Q
5	1	6	Apostolos Siskos	Greece	1:56.42	Q
6	2	3	Polat Uzer Turnalı	Turkey	1:56.94	Q
7	1	3	Ondřej Gemov	Czech Republic	1:57.13	Q
8	2	6	Kregor Zirk	Estonia	1:57.15	Q
9	2	1	David Thomasberger	Germany	1:57.80	
10	1	2	Joshua Gammon	Great Britain	1:58.12	
11	2	2	Marius Toscan	Switzerland	1:58.47	
12	1	7	Ramil Valizade	Azerbaijan	1:58.86	
13	2	7	Jack Cassin	Ireland	1:58.89	
14	2	8	Sebastian Lunak	Czech Republic	1:58.98	
15	1	1	Heorhii Lukashev	Ukraine	1:59.06	
	1	8	Edward Mildred	Great Britain	DSQ	

=== Final ===
The final was held on 22 June at 18:30.

Rank	Lane	Name	Nationality	Time	Notes
1st place, gold medalist(s)	4	Kristóf Milák	Hungary	1:54.43	
2nd place, silver medalist(s)	5	Krzysztof Chmielewski	Poland	1:54.78	
3rd place, bronze medalist(s)	3	Michał Chmielewski	Poland	1:55.51	
4	6	Richárd Márton	Hungary	1:56.07	
5	2	Apostolos Siskos	Greece	1:56.44	
6	7	Polat Uzer Turnalı	Turkey	1:56.55	
6	1	Ondřej Gemov	Czech Republic	1:57.26	
8	8	Kregor Zirk	Estonia	1:58.24	
