= Maldives at the 2024 World Aquatics Championships =

- Flag of the Maldives
- FINA code: MDV
- National federation: Swimming Association of Maldives
- Website: swimming.org.mv

in Doha, Qatar
- Competitors: 4 in 1 sport
- Medals: Gold 0 Silver 0 Bronze 0 Total 0

World Aquatics Championships appearances
- 1973; 1975; 1978; 1982; 1986; 1991; 1994; 1998; 2001; 2003; 2005; 2007; 2009; 2011; 2013; 2015; 2017; 2019; 2022; 2023; 2024

Maldives competed at the 2024 World Aquatics Championships in Doha, Qatar from 2 to 18 February.

== Competitors ==
The following is the list of competitors in the Championships.

| Sport | Men | Women | Total |
|---|---|---|---|
| Swimming | 2 | 2 | 4 |
| Total | 2 | 2 | 4 |

== Swimming ==
Maldives entered 4 swimmers.

Men

| Athlete | Event | Heat | | Semifinal | | Final | |
| Athlete | Event | Time | Rank | Time | Rank | Time | Rank |
|---|---|---|---|---|---|---|---|
| Mubal Azzam Ibrahim | 50 metre breaststroke | 33.24 NR | 52 | Did not advance | | | |
| Mubal Azzam Ibrahim | 100 metre breaststroke | 1:14.58 NR | 72 | Did not advance | | | |
| Mohamed Shiham | 200 metre freestyle | 2:06.32 | 66 | Did not advance | | | |
| Mohamed Shiham | 400 metre freestyle | 4:31.96 | 56 | — | | Did not advance | |

Women

| Athlete | Event | Heat | | Semifinal | | Final | |
| Athlete | Event | Time | Rank | Time | Rank | Time | Rank |
|---|---|---|---|---|---|---|---|
| Hamna Ahmed | 100 metre backstroke | 1:18.71 | 56 | Did not advance | | | |
| Hamna Ahmed | 200 metre individual medley | 2:54.15 | 25 | Did not advance | | | |
| Aishath Shaig | 50 metre freestyle | 29.47 | 81 | Did not advance | | | |
| Aishath Shaig | 100 metre freestyle | 1:06.27 | 74 | Did not advance | | | |

Mixed

| Athlete | Event | Heat | | Semifinal | | Final | |
| Athlete | Event | Time | Rank | Time | Rank | Time | Rank |
|---|---|---|---|---|---|---|---|
| Hamna Ahmed; Mubal Azzam Ibrahim; Aishath Shaig; Mohamed Shiham | 4 × 100 m freestyle relay | 4:14.17 | 20 | — | | Did not advance | |
| Hamna Ahmed; Mubal Azzam Ibrahim; Aishath Shaig; Mohamed Shiham | 4 × 100 m medley relay | 4:41.83 | 32 | — | | Did not advance | |
