= Guyana at the 2017 World Aquatics Championships =

Guyana at the 2015 World Aquatics Championships
- Flag of Guyana
- FINA code: GUY
- National federation: Guyana Amateur Swimming Association

in Budapest, Hungary
- Competitors: 3 in 1 sport
- Medals: Gold 0 Silver 0 Bronze 0 Total 0

World Aquatics Championships appearances
- 1973; 1975; 1978; 1982; 1986; 1991; 1994; 1998; 2001; 2003; 2005; 2007; 2009; 2011; 2013; 2015; 2017; 2019; 2022; 2023; 2024

Guyana competed at the 2017 World Aquatics Championships in Budapest, Hungary from 14 July to 30 July.

== Swimming ==
Guyana has received a Universality invitation from FINA to send three swimmers (two men and one woman) to the World Championships.

Athlete	Event	Heat		Semifinal		Final	
Athlete	Event	Time	Rank	Time	Rank	Time	Rank
Joseph Denobrega	Men's 50 m freestyle	26.57	106	did not advance			
Joseph Denobrega	Men's 50 m butterfly	27.50	71	did not advance			
Hannibal Gaskin	Men's 100 m freestyle	55.53	87	did not advance			
Hannibal Gaskin	Men's 100 m butterfly	58.69	67	did not advance			
Jamila Sanmoogan	Women's 50 m freestyle	28.45	62	did not advance			
Jamila Sanmoogan	Women's 50 m butterfly	30.02 NR	45	did not advance			
