= Maldives at the 2019 World Aquatics Championships =

- Flag of Maldives
- FINA code: MDV
- National federation: Swimming Association of Maldives
- Website: www.swimmaldives.org.mv

in Gwangju, South Korea
- Competitors: 4 in 1 sport
- Medals: Gold 0 Silver 0 Bronze 0 Total 0

World Aquatics Championships appearances
- 1973; 1975; 1978; 1982; 1986; 1991; 1994; 1998; 2001; 2003; 2005; 2007; 2009; 2011; 2013; 2015; 2017; 2019; 2022; 2023; 2024

The Maldives competed at the 2019 World Aquatics Championships in Gwangju, South Korea from 12 to 28 July.

== Swimming ==
The Maldives entered four swimmers.

Men

Athlete	Event	Heat		Semifinal		Final	
Athlete	Event	Time	Rank	Time	Rank	Time	Rank
Mubal Azzam Ibrahim	100 m freestyle	58.24	108	did not advance			
Mubal Azzam Ibrahim	200 m freestyle	2:09.06	65	did not advance			
Ali Imaan	50 m freestyle	27.21	115	did not advance			
Ali Imaan	200 m backstroke	2:33.23	42	did not advance			

Women

Athlete	Event	Heat		Semifinal		Final	
Athlete	Event	Time	Rank	Time	Rank	Time	Rank
Aishath Sajina	100 m breaststroke	1:27.10	55	did not advance			
Aishath Sajina	200 m breaststroke	3:04.53	33	did not advance			
Aishath Sausan	50 m backstroke	35.41	44	did not advance			
Aishath Sausan	100 m backstroke	1:19.82	62	did not advance			

Mixed

Athlete	Event	Heat		Final	
Athlete	Event	Time	Rank	Time	Rank
Ali Imaan; Aishath Sausan; Sajina Aishath; Mubal Azzam Ibrahim	4 × 100 m freestyle relay	4:25.91	35	did not advance	
Aishath Sausan; Sajina Aishath; Mubal Azzam Ibrahim; Imaan Ali	4 × 100 m medley relay	4:56.79	36	did not advance	
