= 2024 World Aquatics Swimming Championships (25 m) – Men's 200 metre butterfly =

Swimming competition

Men's 200 metre butterfly at the 2024 World Aquatics Swimming Championships (25 m)
- Venue: Duna Arena
- Location: Budapest, Hungary
- Dates: 12 December
- Competitors: 45 from 41 nations
- Winning time: 1:48.24 =CR AM

Medalists
gold medal	Ilya Kharun	Canada
silver medal	Alberto Razzetti	Italy
bronze medal	Krzysztof Chmielewski	Poland

The men's 200 metre butterfly event at the 2024 World Aquatics Swimming Championships (25 m) was held on 12 December 2024 at the Duna Arena in Budapest, Hungary.

== Records ==
Prior to the competition, the existing world and championship records were as follows.

World record	Tomoru Honda (JPN)	1:46.85	Tokyo, Japan	22 October 2022
Competition record	Daiya Seto (JPN)	1:48.24	Hangzhou, China	11 December 2018

The following new records were set during this competition:

Date	Event	Name	Nationality	Time	Record
12 December	Final	Ilya Kharun	Canada	1:48.24	=CR

== Background ==
South Africa's Chad Le Clos was the defending champion and former world record holder in the event. He had won four titles since 2010 and entered as the second seed after a season-best 1:50.42 at the final World Cup stop. The top seed was Italy’s Alberto Razzetti, who swam 1:50.10 to win silver at the 2023 European Championships. Canada's Ilya Kharun, the reigning Olympic bronze medallist, held both the Canadian short-course (25 m) and long-course (50 m) records and aimed to improve on his 8th-place finish at the previous World Short Course Championships. The USA’s Trenton Julian, who placed 7th at the previous Worlds, entered with a season best of 1:51.00. Estonia’s Kregor Zirk and Razzetti both featured consistently during the World Cup series, while Poland’s Krzysztof Chmielewski, a 2024 Olympic finalist, had competed primarily in yards so far in the season. Japan’s Daiya Seto, a former champion, was absent from the event due to injury.

SwimSwam predicted Kharun would win, Le Clos would come second, and Julian would come third.

== Results ==
=== Heats ===
The heats were started at 9:48.

Rank	Heat	Lane	Name	Nationality	Time	Notes
1	5	4	Alberto Razzetti	Italy	1:49.44	Q
2	3	6	Ilya Kharun	Canada	1:50.11	Q, NR
3	3	2	Krzysztof Chmielewski	Poland	1:50.39	Q
3	4	6	Kregor Zirk	Estonia	1:50.39	Q, NR
5	3	4	Trenton Julian	United States	1:50.58	Q
6	2	7	Andrey Minakov	Neutral Athletes B	1:50.62	Q
7	3	3	Nicolas Albiero	Brazil	1:50.83	Q
8	3	5	Richárd Márton	Hungary	1:51.79	Q
9	3	7	Michał Chmielewski	Poland	1:51.83	R
10	4	4	Chad le Clos	South Africa	1:51.89	R
11	4	5	Arbidel González	Spain	1:51.92	NR
12	5	5	Miguel Martínez	Spain	1:52.63	
13	4	3	Clément Secchi	France	1:52.72	
14	4	1	Dare Rose	United States	1:52.78	
15	5	3	Huang Zhiwei	China	1:52.88	
16	5	1	Jack Cassin	Ireland	1:53.19	=NR
17	5	6	Harrison Turner	Australia	1:53.38	
18	5	9	Abdalla Youssef Nasr	Egypt	1:53.42	NR
19	4	7	Wang Kuan-hung	Chinese Taipei	1:53.63	
20	5	0	Joshua Gammon	Great Britain	1:53.88	
21	5	8	Apostolos Siskos	Greece	1:53.90	
22	4	2	Alessandro Ragaini	Italy	1:55.23	
23	3	9	Yeziel Morales	Puerto Rico	1:55.40	NR
23	5	7	Andreas Rizek	Austria	1:55.40	
25	3	0	Samuel Košťál	Slovakia	1:55.63	
26	4	8	Marius Toscan	Switzerland	1:56.04	
27	2	5	Erick Gordillo	Guatemala	1:56.15	NR
28	3	1	Polat Uzer Turnalı	Turkey	1:56.42	
29	1	4	Maro Miknić	Croatia	1:57.13	
30	2	1	Maxim Skazobtsov	Kazakhstan	1:57.27	
31	3	8	Surasit Thongdeang	Thailand	1:57.61	
32	2	6	Matin Balsini	ART	1:58.51	
33	4	9	Heorhii Lukashev	Ukraine	1:58.61	
34	4	0	Ardi Azman	Singapore	1:59.24	
35	2	4	Elijah Daley	Bermuda	2:00.08	
36	1	7	Steven Aimable	Senegal	2:01.15	NR
37	1	8	Hashim Haba	Iraq	2:01.91	
38	2	9	Ethan Stubbs-Green	Netherlands Antilles	2:02.37	
39	2	0	Christian Jerome	Haiti	2:03.77	
40	1	2	Mohammed Al-Zaki	Saudi Arabia	2:04.17	
41	1	5	Soud Al-Enezi	Kuwait	2:08.23	
42	1	1	Salem Sabt	United Arab Emirates	2:08.89	
43	1	6	Mohamed Rihan Shiham	Maldives	2:17.93	NR
44	1	3	Jaden Francis	Guam	2:22.47	
	2	8	Gerald Hernández	Nicaragua	Disqualified	
	2	2	Diego Balbi	Peru	Did not start	
	2	3	Isak Brisenfeldt	Faroe Islands	Did not start	

=== Final ===
The final was held at 18:06.

Rank	Lane	Name	Nationality	Time	Notes
1st place, gold medalist(s)	5	Ilya Kharun	Canada	1:48.24	=CR, AM
2nd place, silver medalist(s)	4	Alberto Razzetti	Italy	1:48.64	ER
3rd place, bronze medalist(s)	3	Krzysztof Chmielewski	Poland	1:49.26	NR
4	7	Andrey Minakov	Neutral Athletes B	1:50.39	
5	2	Trenton Julian	United States	1:50.51	
6	6	Kregor Zirk	Estonia	1:50.72	
7	1	Nicolas Albiero	Brazil	1:50.97	
8	8	Richárd Márton	Hungary	1:51.48	
