= Guyana at the 2011 World Aquatics Championships =

- Flag of Guyana
- FINA code: GUY
- National federation: Guyana Amateur Swimming Association

in Shanghai, China
- Competitors: 3 in 1 sports
- Medals: Gold 0 Silver 0 Bronze 0 Total 0

World Aquatics Championships appearances
- 1973; 1975; 1978; 1982; 1986; 1991; 1994; 1998; 2001; 2003; 2005; 2007; 2009; 2011; 2013; 2015; 2017; 2019; 2022; 2023; 2024

Guyana competed at the 2011 World Aquatics Championships in Shanghai, China between July 16 and 31, 2011.

== Swimming ==
Guyana qualified 3 swimmers.

Men

Athlete	Event	Heats		Semifinals		Final	
Athlete	Event	Time	Rank	Time	Rank	Time	Rank
Niall Roberts	Men's 50m Freestyle	24.80	62	did not advance			
Niall Roberts	Men's 100m Freestyle	54.99	74	did not advance			

Women

Athlete	Event	Heats		Semifinals		Final	
Athlete	Event	Time	Rank	Time	Rank	Time	Rank
Britany van Lange	Women's 100m Freestyle	1:01.39	55	did not advance			
Britany van Lange	Women's 200m Freestyle	2:16.40	46	did not advance			
Jessica Stephenson	Women's 100m Breaststroke	1:16.54	40	did not advance			
Jessica Stephenson	Women's 200m Breaststroke	2:46.28	36	did not advance			
