= Maldives at the 2017 World Aquatics Championships =

- Flag of Maldives
- FINA code: MDV
- National federation: Swimming Association of Maldives
- Website: www.swimmaldives.org.mv

in Budapest, Hungary
- Competitors: 4 in 1 sport
- Medals: Gold 0 Silver 0 Bronze 0 Total 0

World Aquatics Championships appearances
- 1973; 1975; 1978; 1982; 1986; 1991; 1994; 1998; 2001; 2003; 2005; 2007; 2009; 2011; 2013; 2015; 2017; 2019; 2022; 2023; 2024

The Maldives competed at the 2017 World Aquatics Championships in Budapest, Hungary from 14 July to 30 July.

== Swimming ==
Maldives has received a Universality invitation from FINA to send a maximum of four swimmers (two men and two women) to the World Championships.

Athlete	Event	Heat		Semifinal		Final	
Athlete	Event	Time	Rank	Time	Rank	Time	Rank
Mubal Ibrahim	Men's 400 m freestyle	4:51.57	52	—		did not advance	
Mubal Ibrahim	Men's 400 m individual medley	5:48.11	37	—		did not advance	
Adnan Ismail	Men's 50 m freestyle	27.72	113	did not advance			
Adnan Ismail	Men's 100 m freestyle	1:01.68	109	did not advance			
Sajina Aishath	Women's 50 m breaststroke	39.74	47	did not advance			
Sajina Aishath	Women's 100 m breaststroke	1:28.92	53	did not advance			
Aminath Shajan	Women's 50 m freestyle	30.50	72	did not advance			
Aminath Shajan	Women's 100 m freestyle	1:10.17	74	did not advance			
Mubal Ibrahim; Adnan Ismail; Sajina Aishath; Aminath Shajan	Mixed 4×100 m freestyle relay	4:31.24	21	—		did not advance	
Mubal Ibrahim; Adnan Ismail; Sajina Aishath; Aminath Shajan	Mixed 4×100 m medley relay	5:07.35	22	—		did not advance	
