= Guyana at the 2023 World Aquatics Championships =

- Flag of Guyana
- FINA code: GUY
- National federation: Guyana Amateur Swimming Association

in Fukuoka, Japan
- Competitors: 3 in 1 sport
- Medals: Gold 0 Silver 0 Bronze 0 Total 0

World Aquatics Championships appearances
- 1973; 1975; 1978; 1982; 1986; 1991; 1994; 1998; 2001; 2003; 2005; 2007; 2009; 2011; 2013; 2015; 2017; 2019; 2022; 2023; 2024

Guyana is set to compete at the 2023 World Aquatics Championships in Fukuoka, Japan from 14 to 30 July.

== Swimming ==
Guyana entered 3 swimmers.

Men

Athlete	Event	Heat		Semifinal		Final	
Athlete	Event	Time	Rank	Time	Rank	Time	Rank
Raekwon Noel	400 metre freestyle	4:05.70	42	—		Did not advance	
Raekwon Noel	200 metre butterfly	2:05.65	33	Did not advance			
Leon Seaton	50 metre freestyle	24.82	83	Did not advance			
Leon Seaton	100 metre freestyle	53.75	86	Did not advance			

Women

Athlete	Event	Heat		Semifinal		Final	
Athlete	Event	Time	Rank	Time	Rank	Time	Rank
Aleka Persaud	50 metre freestyle	27.98	63	Did not advance			
Aleka Persaud	100 metre freestyle	1:00.67	49	Did not advance			
