= Guyana at the 2024 World Aquatics Championships =

- Flag of Guyana
- FINA code: GUY
- National federation: Guyana Amateur Swimming Association

in Doha, Qatar
- Competitors: 2 in 1 sport
- Medals: Gold 0 Silver 0 Bronze 0 Total 0

World Aquatics Championships appearances
- 1973; 1975; 1978; 1982; 1986; 1991; 1994; 1998; 2001; 2003; 2005; 2007; 2009; 2011; 2013; 2015; 2017; 2019; 2022; 2023; 2024

Guyana competed at the 2024 World Aquatics Championships in Doha, Qatar from 2 to 18 February.

== Competitors ==
The following is the list of competitors in the Championships.

Sport	Men	Women	Total
Swimming	1	1	2
Total	1	1	2

== Swimming ==
Guyana entered 2 swimmers.

Men

Athlete	Event	Heat		Semifinal		Final	
Athlete	Event	Time	Rank	Time	Rank	Time	Rank
Raekwon Noel	100 metre freestyle	52.59	70	Did not advance			
Raekwon Noel	100 metre butterfly	56.24	47	Did not advance			

Women

Athlete	Event	Heat		Semifinal		Final	
Athlete	Event	Time	Rank	Time	Rank	Time	Rank
Aleka Persaud	50 metre freestyle	28.62	71	Did not advance			
Aleka Persaud	100 metre freestyle	1:02.20	59	Did not advance			
