= List of Maldivian records in swimming =

The Maldivian records in swimming are the fastest ever performances of swimmers from the Maldives, which are recognized and ratified by the Swimming Association of Maldives.

== Long Course (50 m) ==
=== Men ===
| Event | Time | | Name | Club | Date | Meet | Location | Ref |
|---|---|---|---|---|---|---|---|---|
| 50 m freestyle | 23.81 | h | Mohamed Aan Hussain | Maldives | 1 August 2025 | World Championships | Singapore, Singapore | |
| 100 m freestyle | 53.80 | h | Mohamed Aan Hussain | Maldives | 30 July 2025 | World Championships | Singapore, Singapore | |
| 200 m freestyle | 2:04.75 | | Mohamed Rihan Shiham | Maldives | 10 April 2024 | Thailand Age Group Championships | Samut Prakan, Thailand | |
| 400 m freestyle | 4:28.34 | | Mohamed Rihan Shiham | Maldives | 26 April 2024 | Malaysia Invitational Age Group Championships | Kuala Lumpur, Malaysia | |
| 800 m freestyle | 9:26.67 | | Mohamed Rihan Shiham | Maldives | 9 April 2024 | Thailand Age Group Championships | Samut Prakan, Thailand | |
| 1500 m freestyle | 18:03.57 | | Mohamed Rihan Shiham | Maldives | 23 May 2024 | Malaysia Open Championships | Kuala Lumpur, Malaysia | |
| 50 m backstroke | 29.18 | h | Mohamed Aan Hussain | Maldives | 24 July 2026 | Commonwealth Games | Glasgow, United Kingdom | |
| 100 m backstroke | 1:04.51 | rh | Ali Imaan | Maldives | 26 September 2023 | Asian Games | Hangzhou, China | |
| 200 m backstroke | 2:22.88 | h | Ali Imaan | Maldives | 29 September 2023 | Asian Games | Hangzhou, China | |
| 50 m breaststroke | 30.98 | h | Looth Mohamed Hussain | Maldives | 25 September 2026 | Asian Games | Tokyo, Japan | |
| 100 m breaststroke | 1:10.95 | h | Looth Mohamed Hussain | Maldives | 19 August 2025 | World Junior Championships | Otopeni, Romania | |
| 200 m breaststroke | 2:41.02 | h | Looth Mohamed Hussain | Maldives | 28 October 2025 | Asian Youth Games | Isa Town, Bahrain | |
| 50 m butterfly | 26.77 | | Mohamed Shiham | Aqua Development | 11 April 2025 | Hungarian Championships | Kaposvár, Hungary | |
| 100 m butterfly | 1:00.14 | | Mohamed Shiham | Maldives | 25 May 2024 | Malaysia Open Championships | Kuala Lumpur, Malaysia | |
| 200 m butterfly | 2:23.94 | h | Mohamed Shiham | Maldives | 27 July 2026 | Commonwealth Games | Glasgow, United Kingdom | |
| 200m individual medley | 2:22.07 | | Mohamed Shiham | Maldives | 26 May 2024 | Malaysia Open Championships | Kuala Lumpur, Malaysia | |
| 400m individual medley | 5:06.92 | h | Mohamed Shiham | Maldives | 22 September 2026 | Asian Games | Tokyo, Japan | |
| 4×100m freestyle relay | 3:49.94 | | Mohamed Yaman Yassin; Mubal Azzam Ibrahim; Ali Imaan; Mohamed Aan Hussain | Maldives | February 2024 | Asian Age Group Championships | New Clark City, Philippines | |
| 4×200m freestyle relay | 8:48.87 | | Mubal Azzam Ibrahim (2:09.68); Mohamed Aan Hussain (2:09.29); Ali Imaan (2:13.11); Mohamed Rihan Shiham (2:16.79) | Maldives | 29 August 2023 | Indian Ocean Island Games | Antananarivo, Madagascar | |
| 4×100m medley relay | 4:25.69 | | Imaan Ali (1:04.51); Mubal Azzam Ibrahim (1:15.49); Mohamed Rihan Shiham (1:03.52); Ahmed Neeq Niyaz (1:02.17) | - | | - | | |
| 4×100m medley relay | 4:24.25 | h, # | Ali Imaan (1:06.04); Looth Mohamed Hussain (1:12.52); Mohamed Rihan Shiham (1:04.38); Mohamed Aydin Niyaz (1:01.31) | Maldives | 11 November 2025 | Islamic Solidarity Games | Riyadh, Saudi Arabia | |

Legend: # – Record awaiting ratification by Swimming Association of Maldives; WR – World record; AS – Asian record;
Records not set in finals: h – heat; sf – semifinal; r – relay 1st leg; rh – relay heat 1st leg; b – B final; † – en route to final mark; so – swim-off; tt – time trial

=== Women ===
| Event | Time | | Name | Club | Date | Meet | Location | Ref |
|---|---|---|---|---|---|---|---|---|
| 50 m freestyle | 27.99 | h | Amna Thazkiyah Mirsaad | Maldives | 28 July 2026 | Commonwealth Games | Glasgow, United Kingdom | |
| 100 m freestyle | 1:02.74 | h | Amna Thazkiyah Mirsaad | Maldives | 26 July 2026 | Commonwealth Games | Glasgow, United Kingdom | |
| 200 m freestyle | 2:25.08 | h | Meral Ayn Latheef | Maldives | 25 July 2026 | Commonwealth Games | Glasgow, United Kingdom | |
| 400 m freestyle | 5:10.57 | | Aminath Shajan | Maldives | | 59th Milo/Pram Malaysia Open | Malaysia | |
| 800 m freestyle | 10:41.41 | | Aminath Shajan | Maldives | 8 February 2016 | South Asian Games | Guwahati, India | |
| 1500 m freestyle | 22:32.83 | | Een Abbas Shareef | - | 2022 | Singaporean Championships | | |
| 50 m backstroke | 31.55 | h | Amna Thazkiyah Mirsaad | Maldives | 27 July 2026 | Commonwealth Games | Glasgow, United Kingdom | |
| 100 m backstroke | 1:11.26 | rh | Amna Thazkiyah Mirsaad | Maldives | 28 July 2026 | Commonwealth Games | Glasgow, United Kingdom | |
| 200 m backstroke | 2:45.97 | h | Amna Thazkiyah Mirsaad | Maldives | 27 October 2025 | Asian Youth Games | Isa Town, Bahrain | |
| 50 m breaststroke | 37.17 | | Sajina Aishath | Maldives | | 59th Milo/Pram Malaysia Open | Malaysia | |
| 100 m breaststroke | 1:23.38 | h | Hamna Ahmed | Stipendium Hungaricum | 9 April 2025 | Hungarian Championships | Kaposvár, Hungary | |
| 200 m breaststroke | 3:03.69 | h | Hamna Ahmed | Stipendium Hungaricum | 11 April 2025 | Hungarian Championships | Kaposvár, Hungary | |
| 50 m butterfly | 31.24 | | Amna Thazkiyah Mirsaad | Maldives | 31 January 2026 | AOSI Championships | Samutprakan, Thailand | |
| 100 m butterfly | 1:12.28 | | Amna Thazkiyah Mirsaad | Maldives | 30 January 2026 | AOSI Championships | Samutprakan, Thailand | |
| 200 m butterfly | 3:04.45 | h | Meral Ayn Latheef | Maldives | 24 September 2022 | Asian Games | Hangzhou, China | |
| 200 m individual medley | 2:39.86 | | Amna Thazkiyah Mirsaad | Maldives | 30 January 2026 | AOSI Championships | Samutprakan, Thailand | |
| 400 m individual medley | 5:57.86 | h | Meral Ayn Latheef | Maldives | 22 August 2025 | World Junior Championships | Otopeni, Romania | |
| 4×100 m freestyle relay | 4:28.16 | h | Amna Thazkiyah Mirsaad (1:04.68); Meral Ayn Latheef (1:04.73); Sarah Mohamed (1:08.68); Aishath Aleena Shahid (1:10.07) | Maldives | 24 August 2025 | World Junior Championships | Otopeni, Romania | |
| 4×200 m freestyle relay | 10:09.97 | h | Amna Thazkiyah Mirsaad (2:28.49); Lyba Hassan Manik (2:26.89); Ayaana Areef (2:43.13); Meral Ayn Latheef (2:31.46) | Maldives | 19 August 2025 | World Junior Championships | Otopeni, Romania | |
| 4×100 m medley relay | 5:04.04 | h | Malaika Linda Imran (1:19.19); Sarah Mohamed (1:25.26); Meral Ayn Latheef (1:15.02); Amna Thazkiyah Mirsaad (1:04.57) | Maldives | 25 August 2025 | World Junior Championships | Otopeni, Romania | |

Legend: # – Record awaiting ratification by Swimming Association of Maldives; WR – World record; AS – Asian record;
Records not set in finals: h – heat; sf – semifinal; r – relay 1st leg; rh – relay heat 1st leg; b – B final; † – en route to final mark; so – swim-off; tt – time trial

=== Mixed relay ===
| Event | Time | | Name | Club | Date | Meet | Location | Ref |
|---|---|---|---|---|---|---|---|---|
| 4×100 m freestyle relay | 4:00.64 | h | Mohamed Aan Hussain (55.67); Mohamed Rihan Shiham (57.34); Amna Thazkiyah Mirsaad (1:02.96); Meral Ayn Latheef (1:04.67) | Maldives | 25 July 2026 | Commonwealth Games | Glasgow, United Kingdom | |
| 4×100 m medley relay | 4:31.16 | h | Amna Thazkiyah Mirsaad (1:11.26); Looth Mohamed Hussain (1:12.49); Mohamed Rihan Shiham (1:02.39); Meral Ayn Latheef (1:05.02) | Maldives | 28 July 2026 | Commonwealth Games | Glasgow, United Kingdom | |

Legend: # – Record awaiting ratification by Swimming Association of Maldives; WR – World record; AS – Asian record;
Records not set in finals: h – heat; so – swim-off

== Short Course (25 m) ==
=== Men ===
| Event | Time | | Name | Club | Date | Meet | Location | Ref |
|---|---|---|---|---|---|---|---|---|
| 50 m freestyle | 23.35 | h | Mohamed Aan Hussain | Maldives | 14 December 2024 | World Championships | Budapest, Hungary | |
| 100 m freestyle | 52.29 | h | Mohamed Aan Hussain | Maldives | 11 December 2024 | World Championships | Budapest, Hungary | |
| 200 m freestyle | 2:01.08 | h | Mohamed Aan Hussain | Aqua Development | 8 November 2024 | Hungarian Championships | Debrecen, Hungary | |
| 400 m freestyle | 4:24.45 | h | Ali Imaan | Maldives | 16 December 2021 | World Championships | Abu Dhabi, United Arab Emirates | |
| 800 m freestyle | | | | | | | | |
| 1500 m freestyle | | | | | | | | |
| 50m backstroke | 28.22 | h | Mohamed Aan Hussain | Aqua Development | 6 November 2024 | Hungarian Championships | Debrecen, Hungary | |
| 100m backstroke | 1:02.81 | | Mohamed Rihan Shiham | Shihams | 18 August 2024 | AOSI Championships | Bangkok, Thailand | |
| 200m backstroke | 2:24.26 | | Ali Imaan | Maldives | 6 December 2019 | South Asian Games | Kathmandu, Nepal | |
| 50m breaststroke | 31.95 | | Looth Mohamed Hussain | New Lagoon | 6 September 2025 | AOSI Championships | Bangkok, Thailand | |
| 100m breaststroke | 1:09.44 | | Looth Mohamed Hussain | New Lagoon | 7 September 2025 | AOSI Championships | Bangkok, Thailand | |
| 200m breaststroke | 2:31.45 | | Izyan Nazim | New Lagoon | 6 September 2025 | AOSI Championships | Bangkok, Thailand | |
| 50m butterfly | 26.67 | h | Mohamed Aan Hussain | Aqua Development | 8 November 2024 | Hungarian Championships | Debrecen, Hungary | |
| 100m butterfly | 59.69 | | Mohamed Rihan Shiham | Shihams | 18 August 2024 | AOSI Championships | Bangkok, Thailand | |
| 200m butterfly | 2:17.93 | h | Mohamed Rihan Shiham | Maldives | 12 December 2024 | World Championships | Budapest, Hungary | |
| 100m individual medley | 1:04.19 | h | Mohamed Aan Hussain | Aqua Development | 9 November 2024 | Hungarian Championships | Debrecen, Hungary | |
| 200m individual medley | 2:19.77 | h | Mubal Azzam Ibrahim | Maldives | 13 December 2022 | World Championships | Melbourne, Australia | |
| 400m individual medley | 5:00.64 | h | Mubal Azzam Ibrahim | Maldives | 17 December 2022 | World Championships | Melbourne, Australia | |
| 4×50m freestyle relay | | | | | | | | |
| 4×100m freestyle relay | 3:59.02 | | Imaan Ali; Mohamed Hussain; Mubah Hussain; Mubal Ibrahim | Maldives | 5 December 2019 | South Asian Games | Kathmandu, Nepal | |
| 4×200m freestyle relay | 9:06.74 | | | Maldives | 8 December 2019 | South Asian Games | Kathmandu, Nepal | |
| 4×50m medley relay | | | | | | | | |
| 4×100m medley relay | 4:32.54 | | Imaan Ali; Ashraf Hassan; Haish Hussain; Mubah Hussain | Maldives | 9 December 2019 | South Asian Games | Kathmandu, Nepal | |

Legend: # – Record awaiting ratification by Swimming Association of Maldives; WR – World record; AS – Asian record;
Records not set in finals: h – heat; sf – semifinal; r – relay 1st leg; rh – relay heat 1st leg; b – B final; † – en route to final mark; so – swim-off; tt – time trial

=== Women ===
| Event | Time | | Name | Club | Date | Meet | Location | Ref |
|---|---|---|---|---|---|---|---|---|
| 50 m freestyle | 28.41 | | Aishath Shaig | Maldives | 2 August 2025 | Western Australian Championships | Perth, Australia | |
| 100 m freestyle | 1:03.68 | | Amna Thazkiyah Mirsaad | New Lagoon | 17 August 2024 | AOSI Championships | Bangkok, Thailand | |
| 200 m freestyle | 2:20.65 | | Amna Thazkiyah Mirsaad | New Lagoon | 17 August 2024 | AOSI Championships | Bangkok, Thailand | |
| 400 m freestyle | 5:13.78 | | Sarah Mohamed | Hamilton Aquatics Dubai | 23 November 2025 | Hamilton Aquatics Winter Wonder | Dubai, United Arab Emirates | |
| 800 m freestyle | 11:17.32 | | Een Abbas Shareef | - | 2022 | Thailand Championships | | |
| 1500 m freestyle | | | | | | | | |
| 50 m backstroke | 32.78 | h | Hamna Ahmed | Maldives | 19 December 2021 | World Championships | Abu Dhabi, United Arab Emirates | |
| 100 m backstroke | 1:13.63 | | Meral Ayn Latheef | - | 2025 | City of Plymouth Annual Swim Meet | Plymouth, Great Britain | |
| 200 m backstroke | 2:43.61 | h | Aishath Sausan | Maldives | 18 December 2021 | World Championships | Abu Dhabi, United Arab Emirates | |
| 50 m breaststroke | 36.55 | h | Hamna Ahmed | Maldives | 14 December 2024 | World Championships | Budapest, Hungary | |
| 100 m breaststroke | 1:20.69 | h | Hamna Ahmed | Maldives | 11 December 2024 | World Championships | Budapest, Hungary | |
| 200 m breaststroke | 2:56.77 | | Sarah Mohamed | Hamilton Aquatics Dubai | 23 November 2025 | Hamilton Aquatics Winter Wonder | Dubai, United Arab Emirates | |
| 50 m butterfly | 31.14 | h | Meral Ayn Latheef | - | 2025 | AP Race: Plymouth Summer Open | Plymouth, Great Britain | |
| 100 m butterfly | 1:11.52 | | Meral Ayn Latheef | New Lagoon | 17 August 2024 | AOSI Championships | Bangkok, Thailand | |
| 200 m butterfly | 2:54.06 | | Meral Ayn Latheef | New Lagoon | 17 August 2024 | AOSI Championships | Bangkok, Thailand | |
| 100 m individual medley | 1:14.07 | | Meral Ayn Latheef | New Lagoon | 17 August 2024 | AOSI Championships | Bangkok, Thailand | |
| 200 m individual medley | 2:37.66 | | Meral Ayn Latheef | - | 2025 | AP Race: Plymouth Summer Open | Plymouth, Great Britain | |
| 400 m individual medley | 5:40.64 | | Meral Ayn Latheef | - | 2025 | City of Plymouth Annual Swim Meet | Plymouth, Great Britain | |
| 4×50 m freestyle relay | | | | | | | | |
| 4×100 m freestyle relay | 4:43.57 | | Hamna Ahmed; Aishath Shaig; Sajina Aishath; Aishath Sausan | Maldives | 5 December 2019 | South Asian Games | Kathmandu, Nepal | |
| 4×200 m freestyle relay | | | | | | | | |
| 4×50 m medley relay | | | | | | | | |
| 4×100 m medley relay | 5:22.99 | | Aishath Sausan; Sajina Aishath; Aishath Shaig; Hamna Ahmed | Maldives | 9 December 2019 | South Asian Games | Kathmandu, Nepal | |

Legend: # – Record awaiting ratification by Swimming Association of Maldives; WR – World record; AS – Asian record;
Records not set in finals: h – heat; sf – semifinal; r – relay 1st leg; rh – relay heat 1st leg; b – B final; † – en route to final mark; so – swim-off; tt – time trial

=== Mixed relay ===
| Event | Time | | Name | Club | Date | Meet | Location | Ref |
|---|---|---|---|---|---|---|---|---|
| 4×50 m freestyle relay | 1:50.76 | h | Mohamed Aan Hussain (25.07); Aishath Sausan (29.80); Hamna Ahmed (30.28); Ali Imaan (25.61) | Maldives | 17 December 2021 | World Championships | Abu Dhabi, United Arab Emirates | |
| 4×50 m medley relay | 2:05.53 | h | Aishath Sausan (33.74); Hamna Ahmed (38.12); Mohamed Shiham (27.95); Mubal Azzam Ibrahim (25.72) | Maldives | 14 December 2022 | World Championships | Melbourne, Australia | |

Legend: # – Record awaiting ratification by Swimming Association of Maldives;
Records not set in finals: h – heat; so – swim-off
