= List of Guyanese records in swimming =

The Guyanese records in swimming are the fastest ever performances of swimmers from Guyana, which are recognised and ratified by the Guyana Amateur Swimming Association.

All records were set in finals unless noted otherwise.

== Long Course (50 m) ==
=== Men ===
| Event | Time | | Name | Club | Date | Meet | Location | Ref |
|---|---|---|---|---|---|---|---|---|
| 50 m freestyle | 23.90 | c, † | Raekwon Noel | Indiana University | 20 June 2026 | TYR Pro Swim Series | Indianapolis, United States | |
| 100 m freestyle | 49.79 | c | Raekwon Noel | Indiana University | 20 June 2026 | TYR Pro Swim Series | Indianapolis, United States | |
| 200 m freestyle | 1:47.08 | | Raekwon Noel | Guyana | 1 August 2026 | CAC Games | Santo Domingo, Dominican Republic | |
| 400 m freestyle | 4:00.66 | | Raekwon Noel | Guyana | 16 May 2025 | Pan American Championships | Medellín, Colombia | |
| 800 m freestyle | 8:25.63 | | Raekwon Noel | Dorado Speed Swim Club | 15 December 2023 | ASATT Invitational Championships | Couva, Trinidad and Tobago | |
| 1500 m freestyle | 16:17.92 | | Raekwon Noel | Guyana | 6 April 2023 | CARIFTA Championships | Willemstad, Curaçao | |
| 50 m backstroke | 27.23 | † | Raekwon Noel | Guyana | 12 August 2025 | Junior Pan American Games | Asunción, Paraguay | |
| 100 m backstroke | 55.72 | | Raekwon Noel | Guyana | 12 August 2025 | Junior Pan American Games | Asunción, Paraguay | |
| 200 m backstroke | 2:04.22 | b | Raekwon Noel | Indiana | 28 June 2025 | Indy Summer Cup | Indianapolis, United States | |
| 50 m breaststroke | 30.29 | | Chase Thompson | Guyana | 2 May 2021 | UANA Tokyo Qualifier | Clermont, United States | |
| 100 m breaststroke | 1:06.73 | c | Chase Thompson | Guyana | 29 April 2021 | UANA Tokyo Qualifier | Clermont, United States | |
| 200 m breaststroke | 2:40.20 | | Onan Orlando Thom | - | 2003 | | | |
| 50 m butterfly | 24.85 | h, † | Raekwon Noel | Guyana | 30 July 2026 | CAC Games | Santo Domingo, Dominican Republic | |
| 100 m butterfly | 53.28 | h | Raekwon Noel | Guyana | 30 July 2026 | CAC Games | Santo Domingo, Dominican Republic | |
| 200 m butterfly | 1:56.62 | | Raekwon Noel | Indiana University | 19 June 2026 | TYR Pro Swim Series | Indianapolis, United States | |
| 200m individual medley | 1:59.35 | | Raekwon Noel | Guyana | 28 July 2026 | CAC Games | Santo Domingo, Dominican Republic | |
| 400m individual medley | 4:42.51 | | Raekwon Noel | Guyana | 7 April 2023 | CARIFTA Championships | Willemstad, Curaçao | |
| 4×100m freestyle relay | 3:55.87 | | | - | 2007 | | | |
| 4×200m freestyle relay | | | | | | | | |
| 4×100m medley relay | 4:34.67 | | | - | 2007 | | | |

Legend: # – Record awaiting ratification by Guyana Amateur Swimming Association; WR – World record; AM – Americas record;
Records not set in finals: h – heat; sf – semifinal; r – relay 1st leg; rh – relay heat 1st leg; b – B final; † – en route to final mark; so – swim-off; tt – time trial

=== Women ===
| Event | Time | | Name | Club | Date | Meet | Location | Ref |
|---|---|---|---|---|---|---|---|---|
| 50 m freestyle | 26.69 | b | Shareefah Lewis | Guyana | 28 July 2026 | CAC Games | Santo Domingo, Dominican Republic | |
| 100 m freestyle | 1:00.67 | h | Aleka Persaud | Guyana | 27 July 2023 | World Championships | Fukuoka, Japan | |
| 200 m freestyle | 2:15.88 | | Britany van Lange | - | 2011 | | | |
| 400 m freestyle | 4:50.41 | | Britany van Lange | - | 2011 | | | |
| 800 m freestyle | 10:03.69 | | Britany van Lange | - | 2011 | | | |
| 1500 m freestyle | | | | | | | | |
| 50m backstroke | 33.90 | | Onika George | - | 2014 | | | |
| 100m backstroke | 1:13.71 | | Soroya Simmons | - | 2014 | | | |
| 200m backstroke | 2:39.03 | | Soroya Simmons | - | 2014 | | | |
| 50m breaststroke | 34.45 | | Jessica Stephenson | - | 2011 | | | |
| 100m breaststroke | 1:14.65 | | Jessica Stephenson | Guyana | 2012 | | | |
| 200m breaststroke | 2:42.20 | | Jessica Stephenson | - | 2012 | | | |
| 50m butterfly | 29.97 | h | Jamila Sanmoogan | Guyana | 7 April 2018 | Commonwealth Games | Gold Coast, Australia | |
| 100m butterfly | 1:07.24 | h | Aleka Persaud | Guyana | 29 July 2022 | Commonwealth Games | Birmingham, United Kingdom | |
| 200m butterfly | 2:47.88 | | Jessica Stephenson | - | 2008 | | | |
| 200m individual medley | | | | | | | | |
| 400m individual medley | | | | | | | | |
| 4×100m freestyle relay | | | | | | | | |
| 4×200m freestyle relay | | | | | | | | |
| 4×100m medley relay | | | | | | | | |

Legend: # – Record awaiting ratification by Guyana Amateur Swimming Association; WR – World record; AM – Americas record;
Records not set in finals: h – heat; sf – semifinal; r – relay 1st leg; rh – relay heat 1st leg; b – B final; † – en route to final mark; so – swim-off; tt – time trial

== Short Course (25 m) ==
=== Men ===
| Event | Time | | Name | Club | Date | Meet | Location | Ref |
|---|---|---|---|---|---|---|---|---|
| 50m freestyle | 22.69 | | Raekwon Noel | Dorado | 8 June 2025 | Dorado Hosted Developmental In | Georgetown, Guyana | |
| 100m freestyle | 50.06 | | Raekwon Noel | Dorado | 8 June 2025 | Dorado Hosted Developmental In | Georgetown, Guyana | |
| 200m freestyle | 1:57.23 | h | Leon Seaton | Guyana | 5 November 2022 | World Cup | Indianapolis, United States | |
| 400 m freestyle | | | | | | | | |
| 800 m freestyle | | | | | | | | |
| 1500 m freestyle | | | | | | | | |
| 50 m backstroke | 25.13 | | Raekwon Noel | Dorado | 8 June 2025 | Dorado Hosted Developmental In | Georgetown, Guyana | |
| 100 m backstroke | | | | | | | | |
| 200 m backstroke | | | | | | | | |
| 50m breaststroke | 28.40 | | Raekwon Noel | Dorado | 8 June 2025 | Dorado Hosted Developmental In | Georgetown, Guyana | |
| 100m breaststroke | 1:10.02 | h | Ronaldo Rodrigues | Guyana | 15 December 2010 | World Championships | Dubai, United Arab Emirates | |
| 200m breaststroke | 2:40.83 | h | Ronaldo Rodrigues | Guyana | 17 December 2010 | World Championships | Dubai, United Arab Emirates | |
| 50m butterfly | 24.36 | | Raekwon Noel | Dorado | 8 June 2025 | Dorado Hosted Developmental In | Georgetown, Guyana | |
| 100m butterfly | 54.02 | | Raekwon Noel | Dorado | 8 June 2025 | Dorado Hosted Developmental In | Georgetown, Guyana | |
| 200 m butterfly | | | | | | | | |
| 100m individual medley | 1:07.76 | h | Ronaldo Rodrigues | Guyana | 18 December 2010 | World Championships | Dubai, United Arab Emirates | |
| 200 m individual medley | | | | | | | | |
| 400 m individual medley | | | | | | | | |
| 4×50 m freestyle relay | | | | | | | | |
| 4×100 m freestyle relay | | | | | | | | |
| 4×200 m freestyle relay | | | | | | | | |
| 4×50 m medley relay | | | | | | | | |
| 4×100 m medley relay | | | | | | | | |

Legend: # – Record awaiting ratification by Guyana Amateur Swimming Association; WR – World record; AM – Americas record;
Records not set in finals: h – heat; sf – semifinal; r – relay 1st leg; rh – relay heat 1st leg; b – B final; † – en route to final mark; so – swim-off; tt – time trial

=== Women ===
| Event | Time | | Name | Club | Date | Meet | Location | Ref |
|---|---|---|---|---|---|---|---|---|
| 50 m freestyle | 26.86 | h | Aleka Persaud | Guyana | 20 December 2021 | World Championships | Abu Dhabi, United Arab Emirates | |
| 100 m freestyle | 59.70 | h | Aleka Persaud | Guyana | 17 December 2021 | World Championships | Abu Dhabi, United Arab Emirates | |
| 200 m freestyle | 2:15.77 | h | Britany van Lange | Guyana | 19 December 2010 | World Championships | Dubai, United Arab Emirates | |
| 400 m freestyle | 4:53.20 | h | Britany van Lange | Guyana | 17 December 2010 | World Championships | Dubai, United Arab Emirates | |
| 800 m freestyle | | | | | | | | |
| 1500 m freestyle | | | | | | | | |
| 50m backstroke | 32.91 | h | Patrice Mahaica | Guyana | 19 December 2021 | World Championships | Abu Dhabi, United Arab Emirates | |
| 100 m backstroke | | | | | | | | |
| 200 m backstroke | | | | | | | | |
| 50m breaststroke | 38.78 | h | Athena Gaskin | Guyana | 12 December 2012 | World Championships | Istanbul, Turkey | |
| 100m breaststroke | 1:24.94 | h | Athena Gaskin | Guyana | 14 December 2012 | World Championships | Istanbul, Turkey | |
| 200 m breaststroke | | | | | | | | |
| 50m butterfly | 29.69 | h | Jamila Sanmoogan | Guyana | 13 December 2018 | World Championships | Hangzhou, China | |
| 100 m butterfly | | | | | | | | |
| 200 m butterfly | | | | | | | | |
| 100m individual medley | 1:16.70 | h | Athena Gaskin | Guyana | 13 December 2012 | World Championships | Istanbul, Turkey | |
| 200 m individual medley | | | | | | | | |
| 400 m individual medley | | | | | | | | |
| 4×50 m freestyle relay | | | | | | | | |
| 4×100 m freestyle relay | | | | | | | | |
| 4×200 m freestyle relay | | | | | | | | |
| 4×50 m medley relay | | | | | | | | |
| 4×100 m medley relay | | | | | | | | |

Legend: # – Record awaiting ratification by Guyana Amateur Swimming Association; WR – World record; AM – Americas record;
Records not set in finals: h – heat; sf – semifinal; r – relay 1st leg; rh – relay heat 1st leg; b – B final; † – en route to final mark; so – swim-off; tt – time trial
