= List of Guyanese flags =

Flags of Guyana

The following is a list of flags used in Guyana.

== National flag ==
Flag	Date	Use	Description
	1966–present	Flag of Guyana	A green field with a black-edged red isosceles triangle based on the hoist side superimposed on the larger white-edged golden triangle, also based on the hoist side, pointed toward the fly side. This flag is designed by Whitney Smith.
	1966–present	Flag of Guyana (vertical)	

== Presidential flags ==
Flag	Date	Use	Description
	1970–1980	Presidential standard of Arthur Chung	
	1980–1985	Presidential standard of Forbes Burnham	
	1985–1992	Presidential standard of Hugh Desmond Hoyte	
	1992–1997	Presidential standard of Cheddi B. Jagan	
	1997–1999	Presidential standard of Janet Jagan	
	1999–2011	Presidential standard of Bharrat Jagdeo	
	2011–2015	Presidential standard of Donald Ramotar	
	2015–2020	Presidential standard of David A. Granger	
	2020–present	Presidential standard of Irfaan Ali	

== Military flags ==
Flag	Date	Use	Description
	1965–present	Naval ensign of Guyana	
	1965–present	GDF Coast Guard flag	
	1965–present	Air ensign of Guyana	
	1965–present	GDF Air Corps flag	
	1965–present	Guyana Defence Force flag	
	1965–present	GDF Force colour	
	1965–present	Guyana Police Force flag	
	1965–present	Guyana Prison Service flag	
	1965–present	Guyana Fire Service flag	
	1965–present	GDF 1st Infantry Battalion Group flag	
	1965–present	GDF 2nd Infantry Battalion Group flag	
	1965–present	GDF Agri Corps flag	
	1965–present	GDF Band Corps flag	
	1965–present	GDF Defence Headquarters flag	
	1965–present	GDF Engineer Corps flag	
	1965–present	GDF G2 Branch flag	
	1965–present	GDF Medical Corps flag	
	1965–present	GDF Ordnance Corps flag	
	1965–present	GDF Signal Corps flag	
	1965–present	GDF Training Corps flag	
	1965–present	Presidential colour of the Guyana Defence Force	

== Subdivision flags ==
Flag	Date	Use	Description
	?	Flag of Barima-Waini	
	?	Flag of Cuyuni-Mazaruni	
	?	Flag of Demerara-Mahaica	
	?	Flag of East Berbice-Corentyne	
	?	Flag of Essequibo Islands-West Demerara	
	?	Flag of Mahaica-Berbice	
	?	Flag of Pomeroon-Supenaam	
	?	Flag of Potaro-Siparuni	
	?	Flag of Upper Demerara-Berbice	
	?	Flag of Upper Takutu-Upper Essequibo	

== Proposed flag ==
Flag	Date	Use	Description
	1962	Smith's proposed flag	A red field with a green isosceles triangle based on the hoist side superimposed on a larger golden triangle, also based on the hoist side, pointed toward the fly side.

== Historical flags ==
=== Spanish Rule ===
Flag	Date	Use	Description
	1530–1785	Flag of the Spanish Empire	A red saltire resembling two crossed, roughly-pruned (knotted) branches, on a white field.
	1785–1819	Flag of the Spanish Empire	A horizontal triband flag of red, yellow (double width), and red; charged with the Spanish coat of arms off-centred toward the hoist.

=== Dutch rule ===
Flag	Date	Use	Description
	1611–1781; 1784–1795	The Prince's Flag	A horizontal tricolor of orange, white, and blue.
	1652–1781; 1784–1795	States Flag	A horizontal tricolor of red, white, and blue.

=== French rule ===
Flag	Date	Use	Description
Pre-Napoleonic Era
	1782–1784	Flag of the Kingdom of France	A white field with several fleurs-de-lis and the royal coat of arms in the center.
	1802–1803	Flag of the French First Republic	A vertical tricolor of blue, white, and red.
Napoleonic Era
	1808–1813	Flag of the First French Empire	A vertical tricolor of blue, white, and red.
Under Client States
	1808–1813	Flag of Napoleonic Spain	A white field with the coat of arms off-centred toward the hoist.
	1802–1803	Flag of the Batavian Republic	A horizontal triband of red, white, and blue with the Republic's emblem in the canton.

=== Under Great Colombia ===
Flag	Date	Use	Description
	1819–1820	Flag of Great Colombia	Horizontal tricolor of yellow, blue, and red with the coat of arms in the canton, showing an indigenous woman, an Orinoco crocodile and the Caribbean Sea.
	1820–1821	Flag of Great Colombia	Horizontal tricolor of yellow, blue, and red with the coat of arms in the canton, showing an Andean condor holding a sword and a pomegranate plant in its feet, ten six-pointed stars, a flame, and a pearl.
	1821–1830	Flag of Great Colombia	A horizontal tricolour of yellow, blue, and red with the emblem of Gran Colombia in the center of the flag with olive branches surrounding the emblem.
	1822 (proposed)	Flag of Great Colombia	A horizontal tricolour of yellow, blue and red with the coat of arms in the center of the flag.

=== Under Venezuela ===
Flag	Date	Use	Description
Pre-Great Colombia
	1813–1814	Flag of the Second Venezuelan Republic	Red field with a white rhombus encasing a black rectangle.
	1817	Flag of the Third Venezuelan Republic	Horizontal tricolor of yellow, blue, and red with seven blue stars on the yellow band.
	1817–1819	Flag of the Third Republic of Venezuela	Horizontal tricolor of yellow, blue, and red with eight blue stars on the yellow band.
Post-Great Colombia
	1830–1836	Provisional flag of the State of Venezuela	Horizontal tricolor of yellow, blue, and red, with the coat of arms of the State of Venezuela in the center.
	1836–1859	Flag of the State of Venezuela	Horizontal tricolor of yellow, blue, and red, with the coat of arms of the State of Venezuela on the hoist side of the yellow band.
	1859	First flag of the Federation	Horizontal tricolor of yellow, blue, and red, with seven blue stars on the yellow band.
	1859–1863	Second flag of the Federation	Horizontal tricolor of yellow, blue, and red, with the coat of arms of the State of Venezuela in the center.
	1863–1897	Flag of the United States of Venezuela	Horizontal tricolor of yellow, blue, and red, with seven white stars arranged in a hexagon in the center of the blue band.
	1863–1897	State flag of the United States of Venezuela	Horizontal tricolor of yellow, blue, and red, with the hexagon of seven white stars in the center of the blue band and the country's coat of arms on the hoist side of the yellow band.

=== British rule ===
Flag	Date	Use	Description
	1781–1782; 1795–1801	Flag of the Kingdom of Great Britain	A superimposition of the flags of England and Scotland
	1781–1782; 1795–1801	State ensign of the British Empire	The famous Blue Ensign used by the colonies of Great Britain. A blue field with the flag of Great Britain in the canton.
	1781–1782; 1795–1801	Civil ensign of the British Empire in British America	Variant of the Red Ensign with a square canton. A red field with the flag of Great Britain in the canton.
	1801–1875	Flag of the United Kingdom	A superimposition of the flags of England and Scotland with the Saint Patrick's Saltire (representing Ireland).
	1801–1875	State ensign of the British Empire	The Blue Ensign, with the flag of Great Britain replaced with the flag of the United Kingdom.
	1801–1906	Civil ensign of the British Empire	The Red Ensign, with the flag of Great Britain replaced with the flag of the United Kingdom.
	1875–1906	Flag of British Guiana	A Blue Ensign defaced with the emblem of Guiana.
	1906–1919	Flag of British Guiana	A Blue Ensign defaced with the emblem of Guiana.
	1906–1919	Civil ensign of British Guiana	A Red Ensign defaced with the emblem of Guiana.
	1919–1955	Flag of British Guiana	A Blue Ensign defaced with the emblem of Guiana.
	1919–1955	Civil ensign of British Guiana	A Red Ensign defaced with the emblem of Guiana.
	1955–1966	Flag of British Guiana	A Blue Ensign defaced with the emblem of Guiana.
	1955–1966	Civil ensign of British Guiana	A Red Ensign defaced with the emblem of Guiana.
Governor's Flags
	1875–1906	British Guiana Governor's flag	A Union Jack defaced with the emblem of Guiana.
	1906–1955	British Guiana Governor's flag	A Union Jack defaced with the emblem of Guiana.
	1955–1966	British Guiana Governor's flag	A Union Jack defaced with the emblem of Guiana.

== See also ==
- Flag of Guyana
- Coat of arms of Guyana
