= Maldives at the 2013 World Aquatics Championships =

- Flag of Maldives
- FINA code: MDV
- National federation: Swimming Association of Maldives
- Website: www.swimmaldives.org.mv

in Barcelona, Spain
- Competitors: 3 in 1 sports
- Medals: Gold 0 Silver 0 Bronze 0 Total 0

World Aquatics Championships appearances
- 1973; 1975; 1978; 1982; 1986; 1991; 1994; 1998; 2001; 2003; 2005; 2007; 2009; 2011; 2013; 2015; 2017; 2019; 2022; 2023; 2024

Maldives competed at the 2013 World Aquatics Championships in Barcelona, Spain between 19 July and 4 August 2013.

== Swimming ==
Maldivian swimmers achieved qualifying standards in the following events (up to a maximum of 2 swimmers in each event at the A-standard entry time, and 1 at the B-standard):

Men

Athlete	Event	Heat		Semifinal		Final	
Athlete	Event	Time	Rank	Time	Rank	Time	Rank
Ashraf Hassan	50 m breaststroke	34.58	73	did not advance			
Ashraf Hassan	200 m breaststroke	2:55.19	43	did not advance			
Adnan Mohamed Muthasim	50 m freestyle	27.53	89	did not advance			
Adnan Mohamed Muthasim	50 m butterfly	29.56	74	did not advance			

Women

Athlete	Event	Heat		Semifinal		Final	
Athlete	Event	Time	Rank	Time	Rank	Time	Rank
Aminath Shajan	50 m freestyle	31.52	73	did not advance			
Aminath Shajan	200 m freestyle	2:32.05	44	did not advance			
