= Guyana at the 2019 World Aquatics Championships =

- Flag of Guyana
- FINA code: GUY
- National federation: Guyana Amateur Swimming Association

in Gwangju, South Korea
- Competitors: 3 in 1 sport
- Medals: Gold 0 Silver 0 Bronze 0 Total 0

World Aquatics Championships appearances
- 1973; 1975; 1978; 1982; 1986; 1991; 1994; 1998; 2001; 2003; 2005; 2007; 2009; 2011; 2013; 2015; 2017; 2019; 2022; 2023; 2024

Guyana competed at the 2019 World Aquatics Championships in Gwangju, South Korea from 12 to 28 July.

== Swimming ==
Guyana entered three swimmers.

Men

Athlete	Event	Heat		Semifinal		Final	
Athlete	Event	Time	Rank	Time	Rank	Time	Rank
Andrew Fowler	50 m freestyle	25.26	97	did not advance			
Andrew Fowler	100 m freestyle	54.72	93	did not advance			
Leon Seaton	50 m backstroke	29.92	65	did not advance			
Leon Seaton	50 m butterfly	28.54	77	did not advance			

Women

Athlete	Event	Heat		Semifinal		Final	
Athlete	Event	Time	Rank	Time	Rank	Time	Rank
Jamila Sanmoogan	50 m freestyle	28.72	68	did not advance			
Jamila Sanmoogan	50 m butterfly	30.21	47	did not advance			
