= Swimming at the 2024 Summer Olympics – Men's 200-metre butterfly =

Men's 200 metre butterfly at the Games of the XXXIII Olympiad
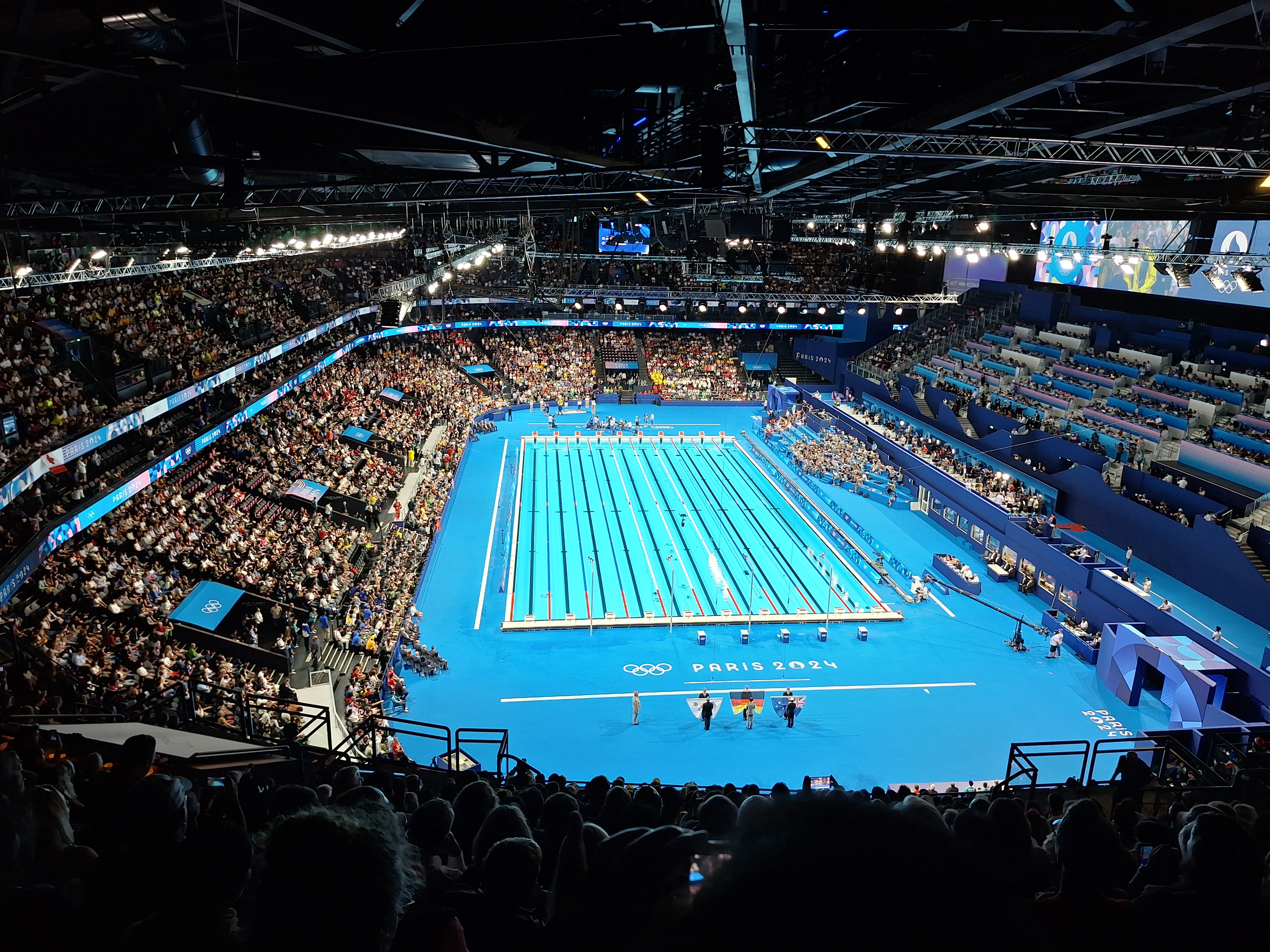
- Paris La Défense Arena after it was converted to a swimming pool for the swimming events
- Venue: Paris La Défense Arena
- Dates: 30 July 2024 (Heats and Semis); 31 July 2024 (Final)
- Competitors: 28 from 23 nations
- Winning time: 1:51.21 OR

Medalists
1st place, gold medalist(s)		Léon Marchand	France
2nd place, silver medalist(s)		Kristóf Milák	Hungary
3rd place, bronze medalist(s)		Ilya Kharun	Canada

The men's 200 metre butterfly event at the 2024 Summer Olympics was held from 30 to 31 July 2024 at Paris La Défense Arena, which was converted to a swimming pool for the swimming events.

Going into the event, defending Olympic champion Kristóf Milák was considered the most likely to win by SwimSwam and Swimming World, but he had taken a break from swimming in 2023, and the Hungarian national head coach had reported that Milák had been training inconsistently. Second in contention was France's Léon Marchand. In the heats (preliminary rounds), Japan's Tomoru Honda, the silver medalist at the previous Olympics, was eliminated. In the semifinals, Kregor Zirk broke the Estonian national record, and Noè Ponti broke the Swiss national record.

In the finals, Milák and Marchand led the race, remaining in the first two places from 15 metres to the end of the race. Marchand was faster on every turn and underwater, while Milák was faster during the butterfly parts up until the last length. At 150 metres, Milák was leading by 0.72 seconds, but over the last length Marchand took the lead and finished in first with an Olympic and national record of 1:51.21, while Milák won silver and Ilya Kharun won bronze. Kharun broke Canada's record and Martin Espernberger broke Austria's national record.

== Background ==
Going into the event, Hungarian Kristóf Milák was the defending Olympic champion. Milák also won the event at the 2019 and 2022 World Aquatics Championships, but in 2023 he said he "hit rock bottom" and took a break from swimming. Milák returned to training in 2024, but the Hungarian national head coach Csaba Sós reported that Milák had been training inconsistently in the lead up to the 2024 Olympics. France's Léon Marchand won the 2023 Championships in Milák's absence, and Marchand lowered his personal best by three seconds over the previous three years, making him the third fastest performer of all time after Milák and Michael Phelps. Japan's Tomoru Honda was also returning after winning silver in the previous Olympics. Both SwimSwam and Swimming World predicted that Milák would win gold and Marchand silver.

The event was held at Paris La Défense Arena, which was converted to a swimming pool for the swimming events.

== Qualification ==
Each National Olympic Committee (NOC) was permitted to enter a maximum of two qualified athletes in each individual event, but only if both of them had attained the Olympic Qualifying Time (OQT). For this event, the OQT was 1:55.78. World Aquatics then considered athletes qualifying through universality; NOCs were given one event entry for each gender, which could be used by any athlete regardless of qualification time, providing the spaces had not already been taken by athletes from that nation who had achieved the OQT. Finally, the rest of the spaces were filled by athletes who had met the Olympic Consideration Time (OCT), which was 1:56.36 for this event. In total, 23 athletes qualified through achieving the OQT, three athletes qualified through universality places and two athletes qualified through achieving the OCT.

Top 10 fastest qualification times
Swimmer	Country	Time	Competition
Léon Marchand	France	01:52.43	2023 World Aquatics Championships
Kristóf Milák	Hungary	01:52.58	2023 Hungarian National Championships
Tomoru Honda	Japan	01:53.15	2022 Asian Games
Krzysztof Chmielewski	Poland	01:53.62	2023 World Aquatics Championships
Ilya Kharun	Canada	01:53.82	2023 World Aquatics Championships
Thomas Heilman	United States	01:53.82	2023 World Aquatics Championships
Genki Terakado	Japan	01:54.07	2024 Japanese Olympic Trials
Giacomo Carini	Italy	01:54.34	2024 Sette Colli Trophy
Wang Kuan-hung	Chinese Taipei	01:54.53	2022 Asian Games
Richárd Márton	Hungary	01:54.54	2023 World Aquatics Championships

== Heats ==
Three heats (preliminary rounds) took place on 30 July 2024, starting at 11:00. (Note: All times are Central European Summer Time (UTC+2)) The swimmers with the best 16 times in the heats advanced to the semifinals. Milák qualified with the fastest time of 1:53.92, while Canada's Ilya Karun and Noè Ponti from Switzerland qualified second and third respectively. Tomoru Honda, the silver medalist at the previous Olympics, slowed in the final 50 metres and did not qualify. Honda commented after exiting the pool: "[For some reason] my mindset was to play it safe, I didn't feel lethargic or anything."

Results
Rank	Heat	Lane	Swimmer	Nation	Time	Notes
1	3	4	Kristóf Milák	Hungary	1:53.92	Q
2	2	5	Ilya Kharun	Canada	1:54.06	Q
3	3	6	Noè Ponti	Switzerland	1:54.77	Q
4	4	2	Alberto Razzetti	Italy	1:54.78	Q
5	3	2	Martin Espernberger	Austria	1:55.19	Q
6	4	4	Léon Marchand	France	1:55.26	Q
7	2	2	Michał Chmielewski	Poland	1:55.28	Q
8	2	3	Wang Kuan-hung	Chinese Taipei	1:55.32	Q
9	4	5	Krzysztof Chmielewski	Poland	1:55.42	Q
10	2	1	Kregor Zirk	Estonia	1:55.52	Q
11	3	5	Thomas Heilman	United States	1:55.74	Q
12	3	3	Giacomo Carini	Italy	1:55.81	Q
13	4	3	Genki Terakado	Japan	1:55.82	Q
14	3	7	Arbidel González	Spain	1:55.86	Q
15	4	7	Kim Min-seop	South Korea	1:56.02	Q
16	4	6	Richárd Márton	Hungary	1:56.03	Q
17	2	6	Luca Urlando	United States	1:56.18	
18	4	8	Nicolas Albiero	Brazil	1:56.49	
19	1	4	Petar Petrov Mitsin	Bulgaria	1:57.03	
20	2	7	Matthew Sates	South Africa	1:57.04	
21	2	8	Lewis Clareburt	New Zealand	1:57.12	
22	2	4	Tomoru Honda	Japan	1:57.30	
23	3	1	Matthew Temple	Australia	1:57.39	
24	3	8	Denys Kesil	Ukraine	1:57.72	
25	1	5	Ramil Valizade	Azerbaijan	1:59.77	
26	1	3	Matin Balsini	Refugee Olympic Team	2:00.77	
27	1	6	Gerald Hernández	Nicaragua	2:06.80	
	4	1	Niu Guangsheng	China	DNS	

== Semifinals ==
Two semifinals took place on 30 July, starting at 20:44. The swimmers with the best eight times in the semifinals advanced to the final. Milák qualified with the fastest time, swimming 1:52.72, and Marchand second with 1:53.50. Ilya Kharun, Noè Ponti, Estonian Kregor Zirk, Poland's Krzysztof Chmielewski, Italy's Alberto Razzetti and Austria's Martin Espernberger also qualified. Zirk broke his own Estonian record by 1.26 seconds, with a 1:54.22, and Ponti broke his Swiss record by 0.06 seconds, setting the mark at 1:54.14.

Results
Rank	Heat	Lane	Swimmer	Nation	Time	Notes
1	2	4	Kristóf Milák	Hungary	1:52.72	Q
2	1	3	Léon Marchand	France	1:53.50	Q
3	1	4	Ilya Kharun	Canada	1:54.01	Q
4	2	5	Noè Ponti	Switzerland	1:54.14	Q, NR
5	1	2	Kregor Zirk	Estonia	1:54.22	Q, NR
6	2	2	Krzysztof Chmielewski	Poland	1:54.28	Q
7	1	5	Alberto Razzetti	Italy	1:54.51	Q
8	2	3	Martin Espernberger	Austria	1:54.62	Q
9	2	6	Michał Chmielewski	Poland	1:54.64	
10	2	7	Thomas Heilman	United States	1:54.87	
11	1	6	Wang Kuan-hung	Chinese Taipei	1:55.07	
12	1	7	Giacomo Carini	Italy	1:55.20	
13	2	8	Kim Min-seop	South Korea	1:55.22	
14	1	8	Richárd Márton	Hungary	1:55.93	
15	2	1	Genki Terakado	Japan	1:56.21	
16	1	1	Arbidel González	Spain	1:56.26	

== Final ==
The final took place at 20:37 on 31 July. Hungarian Kristóf Milák had the fastest start. He reached 15 metres in 5.39 seconds, 0.26 seconds faster than France's Léon Marchand in second place. Over the rest of the first length (15–50 metres), Milák extended his lead over Marchand to 0.64 seconds. Through the turn and underwater, Marchand cut 0.12 off Milák's lead, but by 100 metres (halfway) Milák had extended his lead again to 0.60. Canada's Ilya Kharun was in third. Through the next turn and underwater, Marchand again cut some time off Milák's lead, but Milák extended his lead again through the rest of the length; Milák touched for the final turn (150 m) with a 0.72 lead on Marchand. Through the final turn and underwater, Marchand cut 0.31 from Milák's lead, and he continued to catch Milák over the final length. Marchand won gold with an Olympic and national record of 1:51.21, while Milák won silver with 1:51.75 and Kharun won bronze with 1:52.80.

Marchand swam 58.1 metres underwater throughout the race, compared to Milák's 51.6 and Kharun's 54.4. This led SwimSwam to speculate that this gave Marchand an advantage.

Marchand's win won him his second gold medal of the games, and he went on to win the 200 metres breaststroke event on the same evening (as the Olympic swimming schedule for this evening had been changed earlier in the year to give Marchand a better chance to perform well in both these events), which made him the first to win both these events ever at the Olympics. His 1:51.21 made him the second fastest of all time, ahead of the US' Michael Phelps and trailing Milák's world record. He was also the first Frenchman to win this Olympic event. Austria's Martin Espernberger set a new national record of 1:54.17, and Kharun set Canada's record at 1:52.80, beating his previous national record of 1:53.82.

Results
Rank	Lane	Swimmer	Nation	Time	Notes
1st place, gold medalist(s)	5	Léon Marchand	France	1:51.21	OR, NR
2nd place, silver medalist(s)	4	Kristóf Milák	Hungary	1:51.75	
3rd place, bronze medalist(s)	3	Ilya Kharun	Canada	1:52.80	NR
4	7	Krzysztof Chmielewski	Poland	1:53.90	
5	6	Noè Ponti	Switzerland	1:54.14	NR
6	8	Martin Espernberger	Austria	1:54.17	NR
7	2	Kregor Zirk	Estonia	1:54.55	
8	1	Alberto Razzetti	Italy	1:54.85	

Statistics
Name	50 metre split	100 metre split	150 metre split	Time	Stroke rate (strokes/min)
Léon Marchand	24.96	53.46	1:22.24	1:51.21	51.1
Kristóf Milák	24.32	52.86	1:21.52	1:51.75	47.0
Ilya Kharun	25.06	53.67	1:23.04	1:52.80	51.6
Krzysztof Chmielewski	25.29	54.40	1:23.89	1:53.90	54.3
Noè Ponti	25.23	54.26	1:23.81	1:54.14	47.9
Martin Espernberger	25.79	54.63	1:24.54	1:54.17	51.1
Kregor Zirk	25.39	54.02	1:23.76	1:54.55	49.2
Alberto Razzetti	25.23	53.90	1:23.59	1:54.85	47.7
