= Maldives at the 2023 World Aquatics Championships =

- Flag of Maldives
- FINA code: MDV
- National federation: Swimming Association of Maldives
- Website: swimming.org.mv

in Fukuoka, Japan
- Competitors: 4 in 1 sport
- Medals: Gold 0 Silver 0 Bronze 0 Total 0

World Aquatics Championships appearances
- 1973; 1975; 1978; 1982; 1986; 1991; 1994; 1998; 2001; 2003; 2005; 2007; 2009; 2011; 2013; 2015; 2017; 2019; 2022; 2023; 2024

Maldives is set to compete at the 2023 World Aquatics Championships in Fukuoka, Japan from 14 to 30 July.

== Swimming ==
Maldives entered 4 swimmers.

Men

Athlete	Event	Heat		Semifinal		Final	
Athlete	Event	Time	Rank	Time	Rank	Time	Rank
Ali Imaan	100 metre backstroke	1:04.98	60	Did not advance			
Ali Imaan	200 metre backstroke	2:23.46	39	Did not advance			
Mohamed Rihan Shiham	50 metre backstroke	31.44	62	Did not advance			
Mohamed Rihan Shiham	200 metre butterfly	2:32.93	38	Did not advance			

Women

Athlete	Event	Heat		Semifinal		Final	
Athlete	Event	Time	Rank	Time	Rank	Time	Rank
Hamna Ahmed	50 metre backstroke	35.11	57	Did not advance			
Hamna Ahmed	100 metre backstroke	1:18.17	60	Did not advance			
Meral Latheef	200 metre butterfly	3:05.69	30	Did not advance			
Meral Latheef	400 metre individual medley	6:23.04	35	—		Did not advance	

Mixed

Athlete	Event	Heat		Final	
Athlete	Event	Time	Rank	Time	Rank
Hamna Ahmed; Ali Imaan; Mohamed Rihan Shiham; Meral Ayn Latheef	4 × 100 m freestyle relay	4:17.74	42	Did not advance	
Ali Imaan; Hamna Ahmed; Mohamed Rihan Shiham; Meral Latheef	4 × 100 m medley relay	4:50.64	42	Did not advance	
