= Maldives at the 2015 World Aquatics Championships =

- Flag of Maldives
- FINA code: MDV
- National federation: Swimming Association of Maldives
- Website: www.swimmaldives.org.mv

in Kazan, Russia
- Competitors: 4 in 1 sport
- Medals: Gold 0 Silver 0 Bronze 0 Total 0

World Aquatics Championships appearances
- 1973; 1975; 1978; 1982; 1986; 1991; 1994; 1998; 2001; 2003; 2005; 2007; 2009; 2011; 2013; 2015; 2017; 2019; 2022; 2023; 2024

Maldives competed at the 2015 World Aquatics Championships in Kazan, Russia from 24 July to 9 August 2015.

== Swimming ==
Maldivian swimmers have achieved qualifying standards in the following events (up to a maximum of 2 swimmers in each event at the A-standard entry time, and 1 at the B-standard):

Men

Athlete	Event	Heat		Semifinal		Final	
Athlete	Event	Time	Rank	Time	Rank	Time	Rank
Mohamed Adnan	50 m freestyle	27.17	93	did not advance			
Mohamed Adnan	100 m freestyle	1:00.71	110	did not advance			
Ibrahim Nishwan	50 m freestyle	26.76	89	did not advance			
Ibrahim Nishwan	50 m butterfly	27.42	58	did not advance			

Women

Athlete	Event	Heat		Semifinal		Final	
Athlete	Event	Time	Rank	Time	Rank	Time	Rank
Sajina Aishath	100 m breaststroke	1:32.10	69	did not advance			
Sajina Aishath	200 m breaststroke	3:16.50	50	did not advance			
Aminath Shajan	100 m freestyle	1:07.51	88	did not advance			
Aminath Shajan	200 m freestyle	2:28.75	62	did not advance			
