= Harrison Turner =

Australian swimmer

Personal information
- Born: 4 February 2004 (age 22) Brisbane, Queensland, Australia

Sport
- Sport: Swimming
- Strokes: Butterfly, freestyle
- Club: Nudgee College
- Coach: Shaun Crowe
Medal record
Men's swimming
Representing Australia
World Championships (LC)
Bronze medal – third place	2025 Singapore	200 m butterfly
World Championships (SC)
Silver medal – second place	2024 Budapest	4×200 m freestyle
Pan Pacific Championships
Silver medal – second place	2026 Irvine	4×100 m freestyle
Silver medal – second place	2026 Irvine	4×100 m medley
Bronze medal – third place	2026 Irvine	200 m butterfly
Commonwealth Games
Gold medal – first place	2026 Glasgow	4×100 m freestyle
Gold medal – first place	2026 Glasgow	4×200 m freestyle
Gold medal – first place	2026 Glasgow	4×100 m mixed freestyle
Gold medal – first place	2026 Glasgow	4×100 m mixed medley
Silver medal – second place	2026 Glasgow	200 m butterfly

Harrison Turner (born 4 February 2004) is an Australian competitive swimmer. He is the Australian record holder in the long course 200 metre butterfly with a time of 1:54.17, which he achieved en route to a bronze medal performance at the 2025 World Aquatics Championships.

== Career ==
Turner made his Australian team debut at the 2024 Short Course World Championships in Budapest. He was a late addition to the team, replacing Kaylee McKeown after she withdrew from the competition. In Budapest, Turner competed in the 4 × 200 metre freestyle relay, splitting 1:42.21 on the third leg. Australia won the silver medal in an Oceanian record time of 6:45.54. Turner also finished 17th in the 200 m butterfly with a time of 1:53.38.

At the 2025 Australian Trials in Adelaide, Turner qualified for the World Championships in the 200 m butterfly. He recorded a time of 1:54.90, which made him the second fastest Australian in the history of the event.

At the World Championships in Singapore, Turner swam in the 200 m butterfly final from lane 8. He won the bronze medal in a time of 1:54.17. This was a new Australian record, surpassing Nick D'Arcy's mark of 1:54.46 from 2009.

== Awards and honours ==
- Swimming Australia AIS Discovery of the Year: 2025
