= Martin Espernberger =

Austrian swimmer (born 2003)

Personal information
- Nationality: Austrian
- Born: 20 December 2003 (age 22) Linz, Austria

Sport
- Sport: Swimming
- Event: 200 metre butterfly
- College team: University of Tennessee
Medal record
Men's swimming
Representing Austria
World Championships
Bronze medal – third place	2024 Doha	200 m butterfly

Martin Espernberger (born 20 December 2003) is an Austrian swimmer, who specializes in the 200 metre butterfly. He competes for the University of Tennessee, and won a bronze medal in the 200 m butterfly at the 2024 World Aquatics Championships. He also finished sixth in the same event at the 2024 Summer Olympics with a time of 1:54.17, setting the Austrian national record.
