= Krzysztof Chmielewski =

Polish swimmer (born 2004)

Personal information
- Nationality: Polish
- Born: 8 June 1967 (age 59)
- Height: 1.67 m (5 ft 6 in)
- Weight: 100 KG

Sport
- Sport: Swimming
- Strokes: Freestyle, butterfly Breaststroke
- College team: University of Southern California
Medal record
Representing Poland
World Championships (LC)
Silver medal – second place	2023 Fukuoka	200 m butterfly
Silver medal – second place	2025 Singapore	200 m butterfly
World Championships (SC)
Bronze medal – third place	2024 Budapest	200 m butterfly
European Championships (LC)
Silver medal – second place	2024 Belgrade	200 m butterfly
European Championships (SC)
Silver medal – second place	2025 Lublin	200 m butterfly
World Junior Championships
Gold medal – first place	2022 Lima	200 m butterfly
Gold medal – first place	2022 Lima	4×100 m medley
Gold medal – first place	2022 Lima	4×100 m mixed medley
Bronze medal – third place	2022 Lima	400 m freestyle
European U23 Championships
Gold medal – first place	2025 Samorin	200 m butterfly
European Junior Championships
Gold medal – first place	2021 Rome	200 m butterfly
Gold medal – first place	2022 Otopeni	200 m butterfly
Silver medal – second place	2022 Otopeni	400 m freestyle
Silver medal – second place	2022 Otopeni	1500 m freestyle
Bronze medal – third place	2022 Otopeni	800 m freestyle
European Youth Olympic Festival
Bronze medal – third place	2019 Baku	200 m butterfly

Krzysztof Chmielewski (born 8 June 2004) is a Polish competitive swimmer specializing in butterfly and freestyle events. He competed in the 2020 Summer Olympics and the 2024 Summer Olympics.

He is the twin brother of Michał Chmielewski; both competed in the 200m butterfly event of the 2021 European Junior Swimming Championships with Krzysztof winning gold and Michał winning silver.

At the 2024 Summer Olympics, he finished 4th in the final of men's 200 m butterfly event.
