= 2025 Hungarian Swimming Championships =

- Host city: Kaposvár, Hungary
- Date(s): 9–12 April 2025
- Venue(s): Csik Ferenc Sportuszoda
- Athletes participating: 431
- Events: 42

The 2025 Hungarian Swimming Championships were the 127th edition of the Hungarian Swimming National Championships (Hungarian: Szerencsejáték Zrt. – CXXVII Országos Bajnokság), which took place on 9–12 April 2025 at the Csik Ferenc Sportuszoda in Kaposvár.

== Events ==
Similar to the program's format, swimming features a total of 42 events (20 each for men and women), including two 2 mixed events. The following events will be contested (all pool events are long course, and distances are in metres unless stated):

- Freestyle: 50, 100, 200, 400, 800 (women), and 1,500 (men);
- Backstroke: 50, 100 and 200;
- Breaststroke: 50, 100 and 200;
- Butterfly: 50, 100 and 200;
- Individual medley: 200 and 400;
- Relays: 4×100 free, 4×200 free; 4×100 medley
- Mixed: 4×100 free; 4×100 medley

=== Schedule ===
Legend
Key	H	½	F	TF
Value	Heats	Semifinals	Final	Timed final

Men's Schedule
Date	9 Apr		10 Apr		11 Apr		12 Apr	
50m freestyle			H	F				
100m freestyle	H	F						
200m freestyle					H	F		
400m freestyle			H	F				
800m freestyle							H	F
1500m freestyle	H	F						
50m backstroke	H	F						
100m backstroke			H	F				
200m backstroke							H	F
50m breaststroke							H	F
100m breaststroke	H	F						
200m breaststroke					H	F		
50m butterfly					H	F		
100m butterfly							H	F
200m butterfly			H	F				
200m individual medley	H	F						
400m individual medley					H	F		
4×100m freestyle relay					H	F		
4×200m freestyle relay							H	F
4×100m medley relay			H	F				

Women's Schedule
Date	9 Apr		10 Apr		11 Apr		12 Apr	
50m freestyle			H	F				
100m freestyle	H	F						
200m freestyle					H	F		
400m freestyle			H	F				
800m freestyle							H	F
1500m freestyle	H	F						
50m backstroke	H	F						
100m backstroke			H	F				
200m backstroke							H	F
50m breaststroke							H	F
100m breaststroke	H	F						
200m breaststroke					H	F		
50m butterfly					H	F		
100m butterfly							H	F
200m butterfly			H	F				
200m individual medley	H	F						
400 m individual medley					H	F		
4×100m freestyle relay					H	F		
4×200m freestyle relay							H	F
4×100m medley relay			H	F				

Mixed Schedule
Date	9 Apr		10 Apr	11 Apr	12 Apr
4×100m freestlye relay	H	F			
4×100m medley relay	H	F			

== Medal table ==
Rank	Team	Gold	Silver	Bronze	Total
1	BVSC-Zugló	16	7	11	34
2	Ferencvárosi Torna Club	6	14	7	27
3	UNI Győri Úszó SE	6	3	5	14
4	Debreceni Sportcentrum SI	5	3	2	10
5	Budapesti Honvéd SE	3	2	3	8
6	Újpesti Torna Egylet	2	3	2	7
7	Hód Úszó SE	2	1	0	3
8	Kőbánya Sport Club	1	2	2	5
9	Egri Úszó Klub SE	1	0	0	1
10	Pécsi Sport Nonprofit Zrt.	0	3	0	3
11	Kaposvári Sportközpont SI	0	2	1	3
12	Balaton ÚK Veszprém	0	1	2	3
13	Vasas Sport Club	0	1	1	2
14	Nyíregyházi Sportcentrum	0	1	0	1
15	A Jövő SC	0	0	3	3
16	Darnyi Tamás SC	0	0	1	1
17	Zalaco ZÚK	0	0	1	1
Totals (17 entries)		42	43	41	126

Source: CXXVII Országos Bajnokság – Results

== Records ==
The following new national records were set during the event.

Date	Event	Name	Time	Previous Record
10 April	400 m freestyle	Kristóf Rasovszky	3:45.32	3:45.68 Gergő Kis, Rome (Italy), 26 July 2009
9 April	50 m backstroke	Hubert Kós	24.62	24.63 Hubert Kós, Kaposvár (Hungary), 9 April 2025
10 April	100 m backstroke	Hubert Kós	52.24	52.78 Hubert Kós, Paris (France), 27 July 2024
12 April	50 m breaststroke	Henrietta Fángli	30.61	31.04 Anna Sztankovics, Budapest (Hungary), 22 May 2021
9 April	100 m breaststroke	Henrietta Fángli	1:06.87	1:07.45 Henrietta Fángli, Kaposvár (Hungary), 9 April 2025

== Results ==
=== Men's events ===
Event	Gold		Silver		Bronze	
50 m freestyle	Szebasztián Szabó; Győri Úszó SE	22.13	Nándor Németh; Ferencvárosi TC	22.23	Dániel Mészáros; BVSC-Zugló	22.66
100 m freestyle	Kristóf Milák; Budapest Honvéd	48.76	Ádám Jászó; Pécsi SN	49.11	Dániel Mészáros; BVSC-Zugló	49.43
200 m freestyle	Attila Kovács; Egri UK	1:48.47	Dávid Betlehem; Ferencvárosi TC	1:48.81	Koppány Kakuk; Kaposvári SSI	1:48.89
400 m freestyle	Kristóf Rasovszky; Ferencvárosi TC	3:45.32 NR	Zalán Sárkány; Balaton UK Veszprém	3:47.73	Dávid Betlehem; Ferencvárosi TC	3:47.86
800 m freestyle	Kristóf Rasovszky; Ferencvárosi TC	7:47.07	Dávid Betlehem; Ferencvárosi TC	7:48.02	Zalán Sárkány; Balaton UK Veszprém	7:53.34
1500 m freestyle	Dávid Betlehem; Ferencvárosi TC	14:48.73	Kristóf Rasovszky; Ferencvárosi TC	14:52.82	Zalán Sárkány; Balaton UK Veszprém	15:03.26
50 m backstroke	Hubert Kós; BVSC-Zugló	24.62 NR	Ádám Jászó; Pécsi SN	25.01	Benedek Kovács; Ferencvárosi TC	25.09
100 m backstroke	Hubert Kós; BVSC-Zugló	52.24 NR	Ádám Jászó; Pécsi SN	53.92	Benedek Kovács; Ferencvárosi TC	54.09
200 m backstroke	Benedek Kovács; Ferencvárosi TC	1:56.77	Zsombor Rácz; BVSC-Zugló	2:00.04	Alex Kováts; Győri Úszó SE	2:00.16
50 m breaststroke	Marcos Egri-Martin; BVSC-Zugló	28.70	Olivér Gál; Debreceni SSI	28.76	János Eszes; Újpesti TE	28.81
100 m breaststroke	Marcos Egri-Martin; BVSC-Zugló	1:02.71	Dávid Horváth; Kőbánya SC Balázs Holló; BVSC-Zugló	1:03.24		
200 m breaststroke	Dávid Horváth; Kőbánya SC	2:17.42	Zsombor Bujdosó; Debreceni SSI	2:18.82	Zsigmond Pittlik; Darnyi Tamás SC	2:19.14
50 m butterfly	Szebasztián Szabó; Győri Úszó SE	23.17	Kristóf Milák; Budapest Honvéd	23.43	Hubert Kós; BVSC-Zugló	23.53
100 m butterfly	Hubert Kós; BVSC-Zugló	50.55	Kristóf Milák; Budapest Honvéd	50.67	Richárd Márton; Budapest Honvéd	52.91
200 m butterfly	Kristóf Milák; Budapest Honvéd	1:56.13	Dominik Török; BVSC-Zugló	1:57.40	Richárd Márton; Budapest Honvéd	1:57.82
200 m individual medley	Hubert Kós; BVSC-Zugló	1:56.40	Gábor Zombori; Újpesti TE	1:58.82	Dominik Török; BVSC-Zugló	1:58.92
400 m individual medley	Gábor Zombori; Újpesti TE	4:13.75	Dominik Török; BVSC-Zugló	4:15.12	Balázs Holló; BVSC-Zugló	4:15.40
4 × 100 m freestyle relay	BVSC-Zugló; Hubert Kós (48.76); Dániel Mészáros (49.00); Olivér Kós (50.34); Boldizsár Magda (49.58)	3:17.68	Ferencvárosi TC; Mátyás Harsányi (50.38); Benedek Kovács (50.41); Botond Takács (51.37); Nándor Németh (47.77)	3:19.93	Győri Úszó SE; Szebasztián Szabó (49.16); Benedek Bóna (49.46); Dominik Takács (50.92); Olivér Pózvai (50.53)	3:20.07
4 × 200 m freestyle relay	BVSC-Zugló; Dominik Török (1:49.17); Balázs Holló (1:48.07); Dániel Mészáros (1:50.58); Hubert Kós (1:47.37)	7:15.19	Ferencvárosi TC; Kristóf Rasovszky (01:48.78); Dávid Betlehem (1:49.26); Mátyás Harsányi (1:50.36); Nándor Németh (1:47.52)	7:15.92	Újpesti TE; Gábor Zombori (1:49.43); Botond Kovács (1:52.81); Sebestyén Papp (1:54.72); Máté Kárpáti (1:52.87)	7:29.83
4 × 100 m medley relay	BVSC-Zugló; Hubert Kós (52.64); Marcos Egri-Martin (1:01.91); Zoltán Bagi (53.29); Dániel Mészáros (48.90)	3:36.74	Ferencvárosi TC; Benedek Kovács (54.01); Máté Kutasi (1:04.17); Botond Takács (56.50); Nándor Németh (48.81)	3:43.49	Győri Úszó SE; Alex Kováts (57.51); Péter Herman-Szabó (1:04.58); Anton Kocsu (53.16); Szebasztián Szabó (48.73)	3:43.98

=== Women's events ===
Event	Gold		Silver		Bronze	
50 m freestyle	Petra Senánszky; Debreceni SSI	25.27	Beatrix Tankó; Újpesti TE	25.58	Nikolett Pádár; BVSC-Zugló	25.59
100 m freestyle	Nikolett Pádár; BVSC-Zugló	55.06	Panna Ugrai; Hód USE	55.24	Petra Senánszky; Debreceni SSI	55.48
200 m freestyle	Panna Ugrai; Hód USE	1:58.55	Nikolett Pádár; BVSC-Zugló	1:58.98	Dóra Molnár; Ferencvárosi TC	2:00.21
400 m freestyle	Ajna Késely; BVSC-Zugló	4:08.82	Bettina Fábián; Ferencvárosi TC	4:11.50	Viktória Mihályvári-Farkas; Ferencvárosi TC	4:13.05
800 m freestyle	Ajna Késely; BVSC-Zugló	8:33.94	Viktória Mihályvári-Farkas; Ferencvárosi TC	8:35.56	Vivien Jackl; Budapest Honvéd	8:36.39
1500 m freestyle	Viktória Mihályvári-Farkas; Ferencvárosi TC	16:11.71	Ajna Késely; BVSC-Zugló	16:18.77	Napsugár Nagy; Zalaco ZUK	16:21.75
50 m backstroke	Katalin Burián; Debreceni SSI	29.03	Kiara Pózvai; Győri US	29.38	Fanni Kokas; A Jövő SC	29.45
100 m backstroke	Katalin Burián; Debreceni SSI	1:01.30	Dóra Molnár; Ferencvárosi TC	1:01.88	Fanni Kokas; A Jövő SC	1:02.54
200 m backstroke	Katalin Burián; Debreceni SSI	2:10.55	Dóra Molnár; Ferencvárosi TC	2:10.62	Eszter Szabó-Feltóthy; BVSC-Zugló	2:13.89
50 m breaststroke	Henrietta Fángli; Győri USE	30.61 NR	Sára Bozsó; Kaposvári SSI	31.38	Eszter Békési; BVSC-Zugló	31.88
100 m breaststroke	Henrietta Fángli; Győri USE	1:06.87 NR	Sára Bozsó; Kaposvári SSI	1:08.72	Eszter Békési; BVSC-Zugló	1:09.44
200 m breaststroke	Eszter Békési; BVSC-Zugló	2:29.05	Henrietta Fángli; Győri USE	2:29.70	Laura Zsebők; Vasas SC	2:30.46
50 m butterfly	Beatrix Tankó; Újpesti TE	27.04	Szonja Szokol; Vasas SC	27.25	Flóra Molnár; Debreceni SSI	27.33
100 m butterfly	Panna Ugrai; Hód USE	58.47	Beatrix Tankó; Újpesti TE	59.41	Dalma Sebestyén; Győri Úszó SE	1:00.27
200 m butterfly	Laura Ilyés; Ferencvárosi TC	2:10.59	Dóra Hatházi; Nyíregyházi SN	2:12.42	Glenda Abonyi-Tóth; A Jövő SC	2:12.96
200 m individual medley	Dalma Sebestyén; Győri Úszó SE	2:16.53	Bianka Barta; Kőbánya SC	2:19.75	Tímea Ürögi; Kőbánya SC	2:19.76
400 m individual medley	Vivien Jackl; Budapest Honvéd	4:40.70	Viktória Mihályvári-Farkas; Ferencvárosi TC	4:44.89	Eszter Szabó-Feltóthy; BVSC-Zugló	4:28.27
4 × 100 m freestyle relay	Debreceni SSI; Flóra Molnár (57.51); Dominika Varga (57.29); Petra Halmai (58.84); Petra Senánszky (54.62)	3:48.26	BVSC-Zugló; Nikolett Pádár (55.09); Ajna Késely (58.09); Eszter Békési (58.31); Kincső Szabó (56.94)	3:48.43	Ferencvárosi TC; Dóra Molnár (55.89); Bettina Fábián (57.21); Laura Ilyés (58.21); Boróka Orbán (57.71)	3:49.02
4 × 200 m freestyle relay	BVSC-Zugló; Ajna Késely (2:01.79); Eszter Szabó-Feltóthy (2:04.00); Kincső Szabó (2:03.88); Nikolett Pádár (1:59.07)	8:08.74	Ferencvárosi TC; Bettina Fábián (2:00.96); Viktória Mihályvári-Farkas (2:03.44); Boróka Orbán (2:07.16); Dóra Molnár (2:02.42)	8:13.98	Kőbánya SC; Mira Miszlai (2:04.76); Bianka Barta (2:07.13); Kamilla Nemes (2:05.89); Tímea Ürögi (2:06.65)	8:24.43
4 × 100 m medley relay	Győri Úszó SE; Mónika Ollé (1:04.14); Henrietta Fángli (1:06.07); Dalma Sebestyén (1:00.57); Dorina Lakó (56.67)	4:07.45	Debreceni SSI; Katalin Burián (1:01.84); Petra Halmai (1:09.61); Flóra Molnár (1:01.85); Petra Senánszky (54.53)	4:07.83	BVSC-Zugló; Eszter Szabó-Feltóthy (1:03.05); Eszter Békési (1:08.90); Kincső Szabó (1:02.75); Nikolett Pádár (54.13)	4:08.83

=== Mixed events ===
Event	Gold		Silver		Bronze	
4 × 100 m freestyle relay	BVSC-Zugló; Dániel Mészáros (49.60); Hubert Kós (48.61); Kincső Szabó (56.72); Nikolett Pádár (54.80)	3:29.73	Ferencvárosi TC; Nándor Németh (48.74); Mátyás Harsányi (49.61); Zsófia Szalai (57.43); Dóra Molnár (55.50)	3:31.28	Győri Úszó SE; Szebasztián Szabó (50.72); Benedek Bóna (50.01); Kiara Pózvai (57.77); Dorina Lakó (56.41)	3:34.91
4 × 100 m medley relay	BVSC-Zugló; Hubert Kós (53.57); Eszter Békési (1:09.72); Zoltán Bagi (53.36); Nikolett Pádár (54.72)	3:51.37	Győri Úszó SE; Alex Kováts (57.42); Henrietta Fángli (1:07.22); Dalma Sebestyén (1:00.44); Szebasztián Szabó (48.50)	3:53.58	Ferencvárosi TC; Benedek Kovács (54.11); Máté Kutasi (1:05.04); Laura Ilyés (1:00.78); Dóra Molnár (55.96)	3:55.89

== See also ==
- Hungarian Swimming National Championships
- Hungarian Swimming Association
