= David Thomasberger =

German swimmer

Personal information
- Nationality: German
- Born: 9 January 1996 (age 30)

Sport
- Sport: Swimming

David Thomasberger (born 9 January 1996) is a German swimmer. He competed in the men's 200 metre butterfly at the 2019 World Aquatics Championships. He qualified to represent Germany at the 2020 Summer Olympics.
