= Aishath Sausan =

Maldivian swimmer

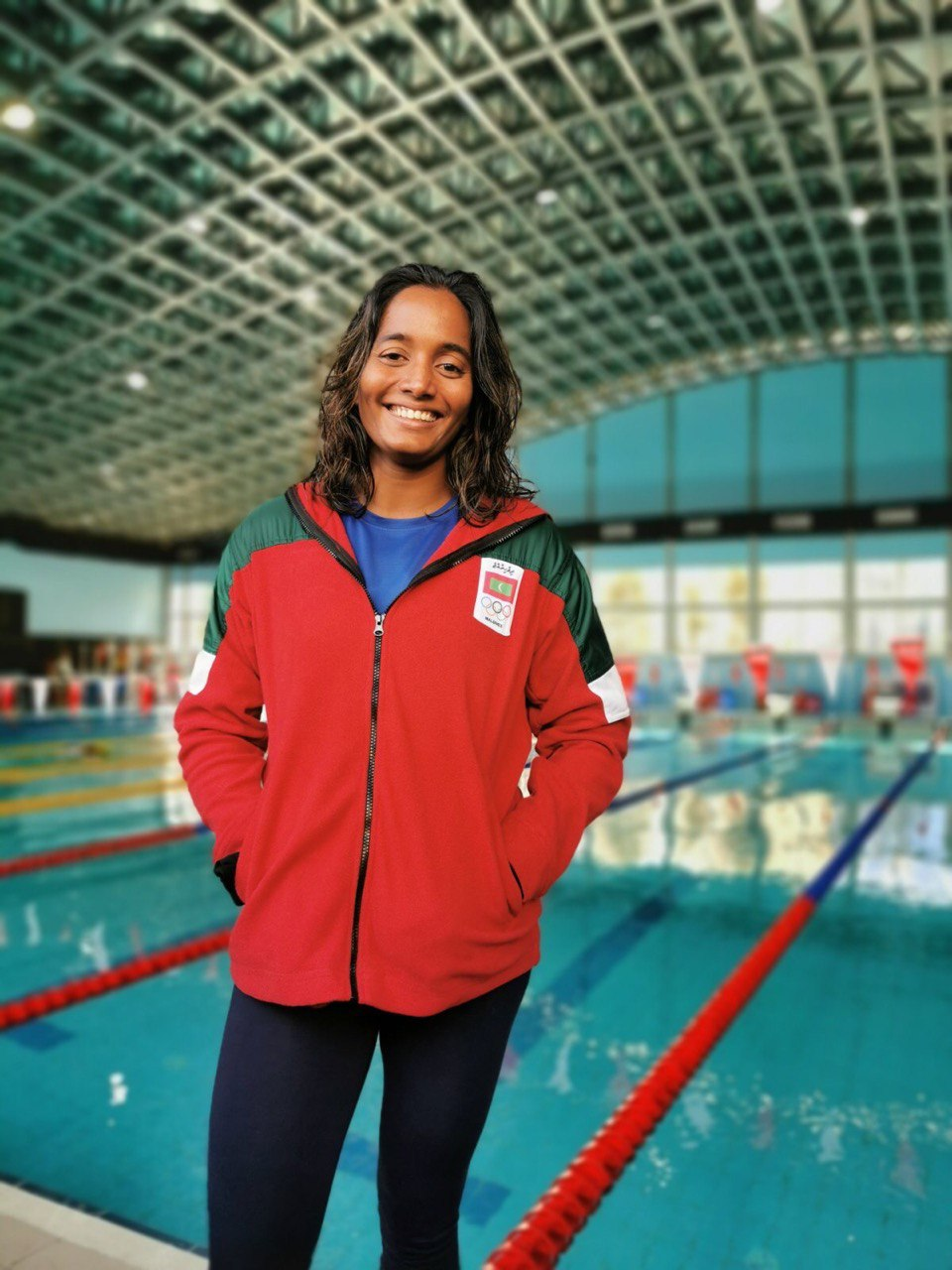

Personal information
- Full name: Aishath Sausan
- National team: Maldives
- Born: 20 June 1988 (age 38)
- Height: 1.65 m (5 ft 5 in)
- Weight: 55 kg (121 lb)

Sport
- Sport: Swimming
- Strokes: Backstroke
- Club: Bluefin Sports Club
- Coach: Adam Mohamed

Aishath Sausan (Dhivehi: އައިޝަތް ސައުސަން; born 20 June 1988) is a competitive swimmer from the Maldives.

Having found a passion for swimming at the age of 9 years while completing an activity badge for her school’s Little Maids group, she started competing at the national level in local competitions. Before making her international debut at the 2009 World Aquatics Championships held in Rome, Italy, she also represented her country at regional events such as the South Asian Games and the Indian Ocean Island Games.

Before taking a break from swimming in 2011 for the birth of her first son, she participated in the 2010 South Asian Games held in Dhaka, Bangladesh; the 2010 Asian Games held in Guangzhou, China and in the 2010 Commonwealth Games held in New Delhi, India.

She returned to swimming in 2016 during the 41st National Swimming Competition held in Maldives and has since participated in various international events such as the 2016 FINA World Swimming Championships (25 m) in Windsor, Canada as well as the 2019 World Aquatics Championships in Gwangju, South Korea.

In 2021 she was selected for the 2020 Summer Olympics held in Tokyo, Japan but was prevented from taking part in the event due to changes enforced by FINA.

She went on to compete at the 2022 World Aquatics Championships in Budapest, Hungary and most recently participated in the 2022 Commonwealth Games in Birmingham, UK and the 2022 FINA World Swimming Championships (25 m) in Melbourne, Australia.

She currently holds a number of National Records in swimming having most recently been declared the top performing female swimmer in Maldives during the 2022 Champion of Champions competition held by the Swimming Association of Maldives.

She has won the Athlete Of The Year Award in Swimming category at the Maldives Sports Awards two years in a row now, both in 2022 and 2023.
