= Swimming Association of Maldives =

Governing body of Swimming in the Maldives

- Association crest
- Founded: 1983
- FINA affiliation: 1983
- Website: swimming.org.mv
- President: Mohamed Abdul Sattar

The Swimming Association of Maldives (SAM) is the governing body of swimming in the Maldives. Founded in 1983, it was founded as the ‘Maldives Swimming and Watersports Association’ before in 2007, it was changed to the 'Swimming Association of Maldives.' The association is governed by the National Sports Council. SAM is a member of FINA, AASF, and the Maldives Olympic Committee.

== Organization ==
SAM has an executive committee of nine members under the president, in addition to a vice president, treasurer, general secretary, coach representative, technical official representative, club representative, individual member representative (male), and individual member representative (female). The committee is directly responsible of the association and if no executive committee is incumbent then a general meeting will be held, where candidates are nominated and voted upon.

=== Association staff ===
Name	Position	Ref
Mohamed Abdul Sattar	President	
Ismail Ali	Vice President	
Mohamed Sharif	General Secretary	
Ali Shameem	Treasurer	
Ahmed Firass Afeef	Coach Representative	
Hassan Siraar	Technical Official Representative	
Aleef Abdulla Naseem	Club Representative	
Mohamed Navvar Ibrahim	Individual Member Representative (Male)	
Raheema Adam	Individual Member Representative (Female)	

== Competitions ==
SAM hosts the 'Interschool Swimming Competition', where schools in the same region compete against each other. As well as Swimming festivals where kids can learn how to swim, the most recent being the 7th Inter School Swimming Festival hosted by the Bank of Maldives.
