= Mohamed Aan Hussain =

Maldivian swimmer (born 2004)

Personal information
- Nationality: Maldivian
- Born: 11 July 2004 (age 22)
- Height: 180 cm (5 ft 11 in) (2022)
- Weight: 64 kg (141 lb) (2002)

Sport
- Country: Maldives
- Sport: Swimming

Mohamed Aan Hussain (born 11 July 2004) is a Maldivian swimmer. He competed in the men's 50 metre freestyle event at the 2024 Summer Olympics, breaking a national record, however not advancing past the heats.

He was the closing ceremony flag bearer for the Maldives.
