= Jamila Sanmoogan =

Guyanese swimmer (born 1997)

Personal information
- Nationality: Guyanese
- Born: 20 March 1997 (age 29)

Sport
- Sport: Swimming

Jamila Sanmoogan (born 20 March 1997) is a Guyanese swimmer. She competed in the women's 50 metre freestyle event at the 2016 Summer Olympics, where she ranked 63rd with a time of 28.88 seconds. She did not advance to the semifinals. She also competed in three events at the 2018 Commonwealth Games.

In 2019, she represented Guyana at the 2019 World Aquatics Championships held in Gwangju, South Korea. She competed in the women's 50 metre freestyle and women's 50 metre butterfly events. In both events she did not advance to compete in the semi-finals.
