= Britany van Lange =

Guyanese swimmer

Personal information
- National team: GUY
- Born: November 17, 1996 (age 29) Georgetown, Guyana
- Height: 1.8 m (5 ft 11 in)
- Weight: 68 kg (150 lb)

Sport
- Sport: Swimming
- Strokes: Freestyle

Britany van Lange (born November 17, 1996, in Georgetown, Guyana) is a Guyanese swimmer. At the 2012 Summer Olympics, she competed in the Women's 100 metre freestyle, finishing in 42nd place overall in the heats, coming close to qualifying for the semifinals. Just prior to the Olympics she had attended the 2012 Carifta Swimming Championships in the Bahamas. Britany van Lange is also a cadet at USMA '19. She is very secretive and has used her Olympic experience to lead Company Athletics for Company D3 in swimming.
