= Aleka Persaud =

Guyanese swimmer (born 2006)

Personal information
- Full name: Aleka Kylela Persaud
- Nationality: Guyanese
- Born: 24 February 2006 (age 20)
- Height: 160 cm (5 ft 3 in) (2022)
- Weight: 50 kg (110 lb) (2022)

Sport
- Sport: Swimming

Aleka Kylela Persaud (born 24 February 2006) is a Guyanese swimmer. She competed in the women's 50 metre freestyle at the 2020 Summer Olympics.
