= Ramil Valizade =

Azerbaijani swimmer (2004)

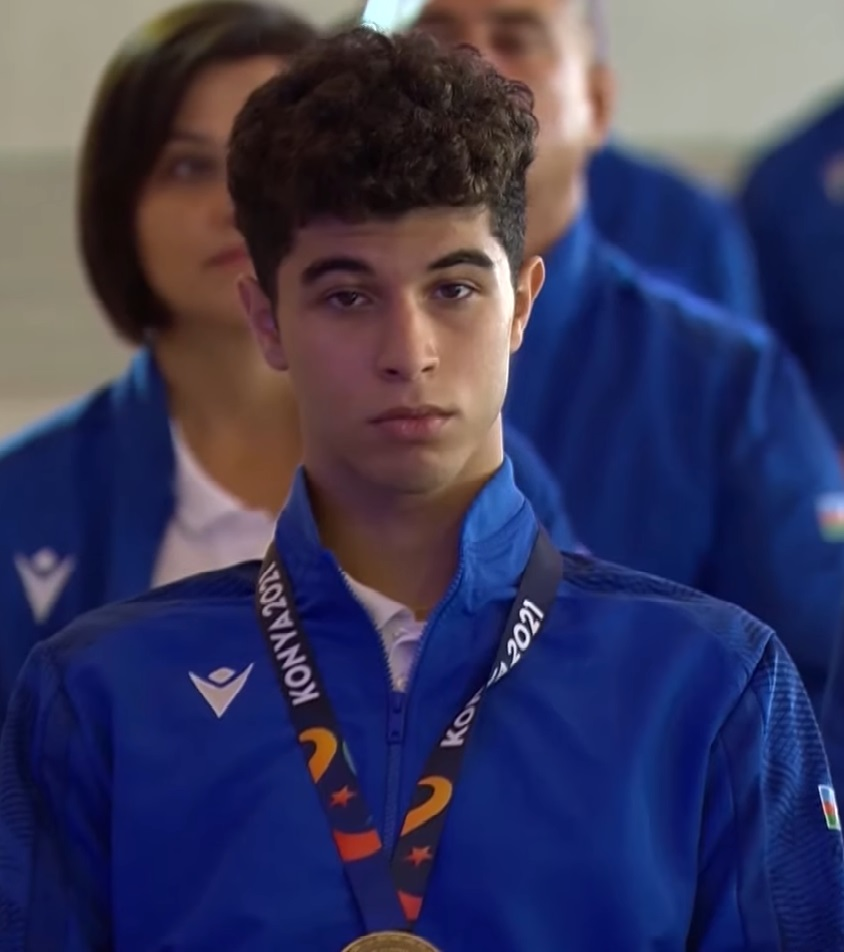
- Valizade in August 2022

Personal information
- Native name: Ramil Vəlizadə
- Born: 16 February 2004 (age 22)
- Height: 1.82 m (6 ft 0 in)

Sport
- Sport: Swimming
Medal record
Representing Azerbaijan
Islamic Solidarity Games
Gold medal – first place	2021 Konya	200 m butterfly
Silver medal – second place	2025 Riyadh	200 m butterfly

Ramil Ali oglu Valizade or Valizada (Azerbaijani: Ramil Əli oğlu Vəlizadə; born 16 February 2004) is an Azerbaijani swimmer. He is a bronze medalist at the 2022 European Junior Swimming Championships and the champion of the 2021 Islamic Solidarity Games. He competed in the 2019 European Youth Summer Olympic Festival, as well as at the World Championships (2021, 2024) and the 2024 European Aquatics Championships. Valizade represented Azerbaijan at the 2024 Summer Olympics in Paris. He was awarded the title of Master of Sport Azerbaijan in 2018.

== Biography ==
Ramil Valizade was born on 16 February 2004, in Baku, into the family of football specialist Ali Valizade. He started swimming at the age of five under the guidance of Yulia Borisovna Dubrovina. Between the ages of nine and eleven, he trained with Mahmud Shahbazov, and since the age of eleven, he has been part of the national team coached by Rashad Abdurahmanov. Until the age of 17, his technical training was overseen by Sergey Bondar and Rashad Aliyev. Currently, his technical consultant is Ivan Petrov from Hungary.

In September 2018, during the Azerbaijan Open Swimming Championship, 14-year-old Valizade met the requirements to earn the title of Master of Sport.

In July 2019, at the European Youth Summer Olympic Festival in Baku, Valizade reached the finals in the 200-meter butterfly event, finishing fifth.

In July 2022, Valizade won bronze in the 200-meter butterfly event at the European Junior Championships held in Romania. A month later, he claimed gold at the 5th Islamic Solidarity Games in Konya, Turkey.

In August 2023, Valizade won a silver medal at the University International Sports Festival in Yekaterinburg.

In February 2024, Valizade competed at the 2024 World Aquatics Championships held in Doha, Qatar. In the 200-meter butterfly event, he recorded a time of 2 minutes 5.58 seconds but did not advance to the finals.

In June 2024, at the 2024 European Aquatics Championships in Belgrade, Serbia, Valizade reached the semifinals of the 200-meter butterfly event and secured a qualification spot for the 2024 Summer Olympics in Paris.
