= Mubal Azzam Ibrahim =

Maldivian swimmer (born 2000)

Personal information
- Native name: މުބާލް އައްޒާމް އިބްރާހީމް
- Nationality: Maldives
- Born: 3 November 2000 (age 24) Malé, Maldives

Sport
- Sport: Swimming

Mubal Azzam Ibrahim (Dhivehi: މުބާލް އައްޒާމް އިބްރާހީމް; born 3 November 2000) is a Maldivian swimmer. He competed in the 2020 Summer Olympics.

Ibrahim took part in international competitions for the first time at the 2018 Summer Youth Olympic Games in Buenos Aires, where he was served as the flag bearer for the Maldives. He placed 43rd out of 54 participants in the 50 m freestyle and 45th out of 46 in the 100 m freestyle.

Three years later, Ibrahim took part in the Olympic Games in Tokyo. He was again selected as the flag bearer, this time alongside Fathimath Nabaaha Abdul Razzaq. In the 100 m freestyle event, he placed 69th out of 70 competitors.
