= Michał Chmielewski =

Polish swimmer

Personal information
- Born: June 8, 2004 (age 22) Warsaw, Poland
- Height: 1.82 m (6 ft 0 in)

Sport
- Country: Poland
- Sport: Swimming
- Strokes: butterfly
Medal record
Men's swimming
Representing Poland
European Championships (SC)
Bronze medal – third place	2025 Lublin	200 m butterfly

Michał Chmielewski (born 8 June 2004) is a Polish swimmer specializing in the butterfly stroke, and a bronze medalist at the European Aquatics Championships.

== Career ==
In February 2024, at the 2024 World Aquatics Championships in Doha, Chmielewski finished fourth in the 200 m butterfly event with a time of 1:55.36.

Four months later, at the 2024 European Aquatics Championships in Belgrade, he won a bronze medal in the same event with a time of 1:55.51.

== Personal life ==
He has a twin brother, Krzysztof, who is also a swimmer.
