= Maldives at the 2011 World Aquatics Championships =

Sporting event delegation

Flag of Maldives

Maldives competed at the 2011 World Aquatics Championships in Shanghai, China between July 16 and 31, 2011.

== Swimming ==
Maldives qualified 3 swimmers.

Men

Athlete	Event	Heats		Semifinals		Final	
Athlete	Event	Time	Rank	Time	Rank	Time	Rank
Husam Ahmed	Men's 100m Freestyle	59.98	88	did not advance			
Husam Ahmed	Men's 50m Backstroke	33.44	35	did not advance			
Inayath Hassan	Men's 100m Freestyle	1:01.74	89	did not advance			
Inayath Hassan	Men's 50m Butterfly	30.03	49	did not advance			

Women

Athlete	Event	Heats		Semifinals		Final	
Athlete	Event	Time	Rank	Time	Rank	Time	Rank
Shajan Aminath	Women's 50m Freestyle	33.43	74	did not advance			
Shajan Aminath	Women's 50m Butterfly	38.37	50	did not advance			
