= Flag of Guyana =

Co-operative Republic of Guyana
- The Golden Arrowhead
- Use: National flag
- Proportion: 3:5
- Adopted: 26 May 1966; 60 years ago
- Design: A green field with the black-edged red isosceles triangle based on the hoist-side superimposed on the larger white-edged golden triangle, also based on the hoist-side, pointed toward the fly-side.
- Designed by: Whitney Smith
- Use: National ensign
- Proportion: 1:2
- Design: An elongated version of the national flag.
- Use: Civil air ensign
- Proportion: 7:11
- Design: British civil air ensign combined with national flag of Guyana. May be flown at airports and from landed aircraft.

Construction sheet

The national flag of Guyana, known as the Golden Arrowhead, was adopted on May 1966, when the country became independent from the United Kingdom. It was designed by Whitney Smith, an American vexillologist (though originally without the black and white fimbriations, which were later additions suggested by the College of Arms in the United Kingdom). The proportions of the national flag are 3:5.

The colours are symbolic:

- red for zeal and dynamism,
- gold for mineral wealth,
- green for agriculture and forests,
- black for endurance,
- white for rivers and water.

== Gallery ==
The national ensign of Guyana is a version of the national flag with proportions of 1:2.

The civil air ensign is a version of the British civil air ensign with the Guyanese flag in the canton.

During its colonial period, Guyana's flag was a Blue Ensign with the colonial badge in the fly. An unofficial red version was used at sea. The first flag was introduced in 1875 and was changed slightly in 1906 and 1955. Like all British ensigns, the colonial flags of Guyana were all ratio 1:2.

1875–1906

Governor's flag, 1875–1906

1906–1919

Civil ensign, 1906–1919

1919–1955

Civil ensign, 1919–1955

Governor's flag, 1906–1955

1955–1966

Civil ensign, 1955–1966

Governor's flag, 1955–1966

Governor-general's flag, 1966–1970

Smith's proposed flag, 1962

== Presidential standards ==
The presidential standard of Guyana came into effect by Proclamation issued on 23 February 1970. Subsequent presidents have amended this Proclamation to replace the description of the flag contained, to reflect the presidential standard they wish to introduce for the duration of their presidency.

Presidential standard of Guyana (1970–1980) under president Arthur Chung.

Presidential standard of Guyana (1980–1985) under president Forbes Burnham

Presidential standard of Guyana (1985–1992) under president Hugh Desmond Hoyte

Presidential standard of Guyana (1992–1997) under president Cheddi B. Jagan

Presidential standard of Guyana (1997–1999) under president Janet Jagan

Presidential standard of Guyana (1999–2011) under president Bharrat Jagdeo.

Presidential standard of Guyana (2011–2015) under president Donald Ramotar.

Presidential standard of Guyana (2015–2020) under president David A. Granger

Presidential standard of Guyana (2020–present) under president Mohamed Irfaan Ali

== Judiciary ==
The judiciary flag of Guyana came into effect on 21 February, 2025.

Judiciary of Guyana

== Joint Services ==
Guyana Defence Force

Guyana Police Force

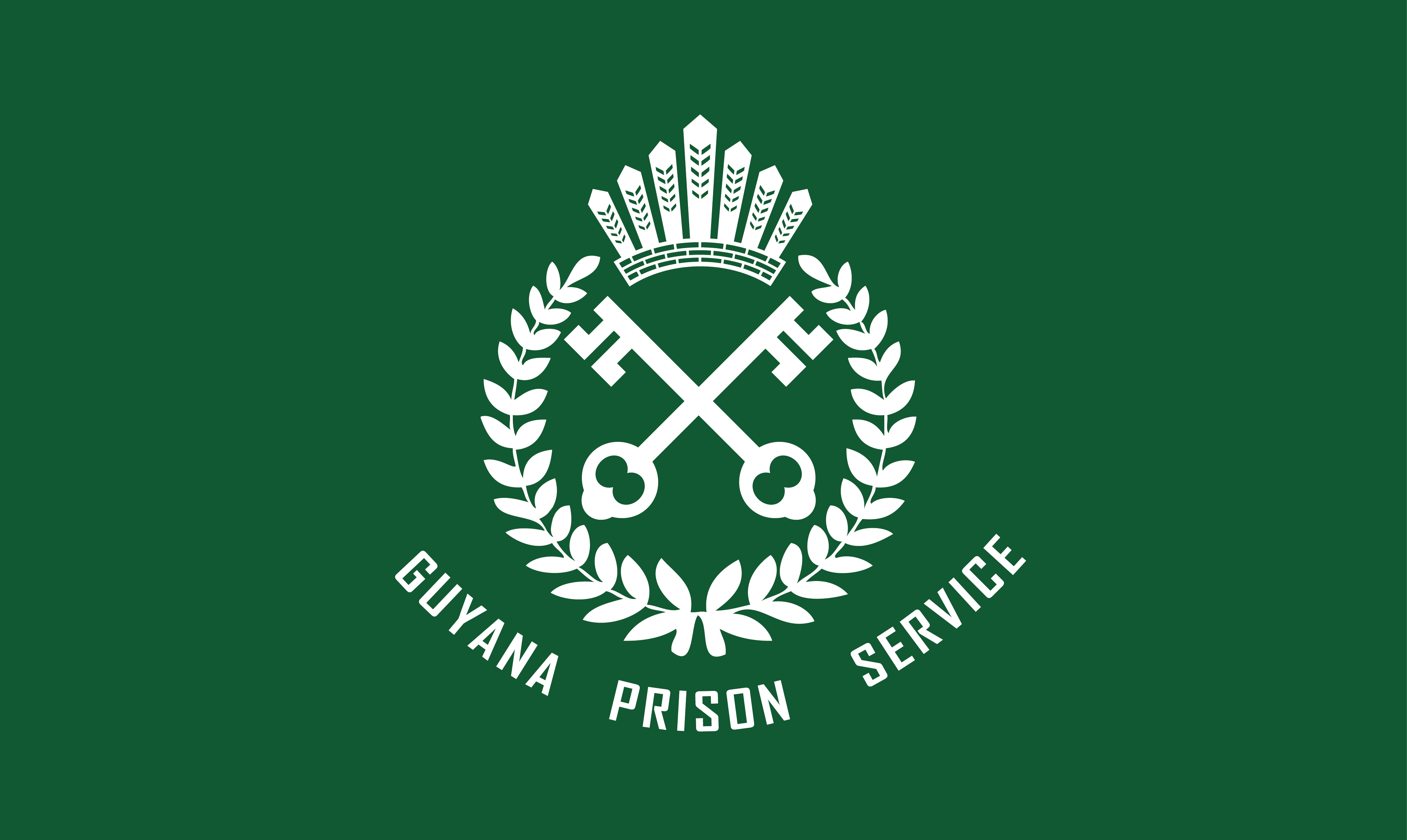
Guyana Prison Service

Guyana Fire Service

== See also ==
- Coat of arms of Guyana
- List of Guyanese flags
