= Swimming at the 2020 European Aquatics Championships – Men's 100 metre butterfly =

Men's 100 metre butterfly at the 2020 European Aquatics Championships
- Venue: Danube Arena
- Dates: 22 May 2021 (heats and semifinals); 23 May 2021 (final)
- Competitors: 63 from 34 nations
- Winning time: 50.18

Medalists
gold medal	Kristóf Milák	Hungary
silver medal	Josif Miladinov	Bulgaria
bronze medal	James Guy	Great Britain

The Men's 100 metre butterfly competition of the 2020 European Aquatics Championships was held on 22 and 23 May 2021.

== Records ==
Prior to the competition, the existing world, European and championship records were as follows.

	Name	Nationality	Time	Location	Date
World record	Caeleb Dressel	United States	49.50	Gwangju	26 July 2019
European record	Milorad Čavić	Serbia	49.95	Rome	1 August 2009
Championship record	Piero Codia	Italy	50.64	Glasgow	9 August 2018

The following new records were set during this competition.

Date	Event	Name	Nationality	Time	Record
22 May	Heats	Kristóf Milák	Hungary	50.64	=CR
22 May	Semifinals	Kristóf Milák	Hungary	50.62	CR
23 May	Final	Kristóf Milák	Hungary	50.18	CR

== Results ==
=== Heats ===
The heats were started on 22 May 2021 at 10:37.

Rank	Heat	Lane	Name	Nationality	Time	Notes
1	7	4	Kristóf Milák	Hungary	50.64	Q, =CR
2	7	5	Josif Miladinov	Bulgaria	51.42	Q
3	6	5	Noè Ponti	Switzerland	51.49	Q
4	6	3	James Guy	Great Britain	51.52	Q
5	5	5	Szebasztián Szabó	Hungary	51.66	Q
6	6	2	Piero Codia	Italy	51.82	Q
7	5	2	Federico Burdisso	Italy	51.83	Q
7	5	6	Nyls Korstanje	Netherlands	51.83	Q
9	7	1	Matteo Rivolta	Italy	51.84	
10	5	3	Jakub Majerski	Poland	51.91	Q
10	6	4	Andrey Minakov	Russia	51.91	Q
12	3	3	Antani Ivanov	Bulgaria	51.93	Q
12	7	6	Hubert Kós	Hungary	51.93	
14	6	1	Louis Croenen	Belgium	52.06	Q
15	7	7	Jan Šefl	Czech Republic	52.21	Q
15	7	3	Mikhail Vekovishchev	Russia	52.21	Q
17	4	7	Simon Bucher	Austria	52.25	Q
18	5	0	Paweł Korzeniowski	Poland	52.28	Q
19	5	4	Mehdy Metella	France	52.31	
20	6	7	Ümitcan Güreş	Turkey	52.32	
21	7	2	Yauhen Tsurkin	Belarus	52.37	
22	2	3	Nikola Miljenić	Croatia	52.38	
23	5	8	Alberto Razzetti	Italy	52.48	
24	4	5	Marcin Cieślak	Poland	52.58	
25	5	7	Tomer Frankel	Israel	52.59	
26	3	6	Alberto Lozano	Spain	52.61	
26	4	6	Edward Mildred	Great Britain	52.61	
28	7	9	Igor Troyanovskyy	Ukraine	52.63	
29	4	3	Ramon Klenz	Germany	52.65	
30	6	6	Jacob Peters	Great Britain	52.70	
31	4	2	Alex Ahtiainen	Estonia	52.73	
32	5	9	Deividas Margevičius	Lithuania	52.74	
33	4	1	Björn Kammann	Germany	52.80	
34	4	4	Alexander Kudashev	Russia	52.82	
35	5	1	Hugo González	Spain	52.87	
35	6	8	Joeri Verlinden	Netherlands	52.87	
37	3	5	Rasmus Nickelsen	Denmark	53.09	
38	1	0	Alexei Sancov	Moldova	53.26	
39	6	0	Lyubomyr Lemeshko	Ukraine	53.31	
40	3	1	Simon Sjödin	Sweden	53.45	
41	3	0	Denys Kesil	Ukraine	53.51	
42	4	0	Andreas Vazaios	Greece	53.61	
43	4	8	Richárd Márton	Hungary	53.64	
43	6	9	Tomoe Zenimoto Hvas	Norway	53.64	
45	2	6	Ádám Halás	Slovakia	53.88	
46	3	7	Niko Mäkelä	Finland	54.03	
47	3	9	Stefanos Dimitriadis	Greece	54.10	
47	4	9	Grigori Pekarski	Belarus	54.10	
49	2	9	Adam Hlobeň	Czech Republic	54.16	
50	2	4	Oskar Hoff	Sweden	54.20	
51	2	7	Nils Liess	Switzerland	54.21	
52	2	2	Ivan Lenđer	Serbia	54.52	
52	2	5	Sebastian Luňák	Czech Republic	54.52	
54	2	8	Xaver Gschwentner	Austria	54.53	
55	1	5	Ramil Valizada	Azerbaijan	55.12	
56	1	4	Andreas Hansen	Denmark	55.21	
57	2	1	Martin Espernberger	Austria	55.29	
58	2	0	Daniil Pancerevas	Lithuania	55.47	
59	1	6	Tomàs Lomero	Andorra	56.50	
60	1	7	Davor Petrovski	North Macedonia	58.08	
61	1	2	Ivan Simonovski	North Macedonia	58.23	
62	1	1	Emilien Puyo	Monaco	59.69	
63	1	8	Paolo Priska	Albania	1:00.16	
	7	0	Konrad Czerniak	Poland	Did not start	
	3	8	Armin Evert Lelle	Estonia	Did not start	
	1	3	Bernat Lomero	Andorra	Did not start	
	3	2	Danas Rapšys	Lithuania	Did not start	
	7	8	Andrey Zhilkin	Russia	Did not start	
	3	4	Kregor Zirk	Estonia	Did not start	

=== Semifinals ===
The semifinals were started on 22 May 2021 at 18:48.

==== Semifinal 1 ====
Rank	Lane	Name	Nationality	Time	Notes
1	5	James Guy	Great Britain	50.96	Q
2	4	Josif Miladinov	Bulgaria	51.10	Q
3	2	Jakub Majerski	Poland	51.18	q
4	1	Mikhail Vekovishchev	Russia	51.50	q
5	6	Federico Burdisso	Italy	51.66	q
6	8	Paweł Korzeniowski	Poland	51.72	
7	3	Piero Codia	Italy	51.86	
8	7	Louis Croenen	Belgium	52.13	

==== Semifinal 2 ====
Rank	Lane	Name	Nationality	Time	Notes
1	4	Kristóf Milák	Hungary	50.62	Q, CR
2	5	Noè Ponti	Switzerland	51.43	Q
3	3	Szebasztián Szabó	Hungary	51.45	q
4	8	Simon Bucher	Austria	51.80	NR
5	7	Antani Ivanov	Bulgaria	51.94	
6	2	Andrey Minakov	Russia	51.98	
7	6	Nyls Korstanje	Netherlands	52.25	
8	1	Jan Šefl	Czech Republic	52.36	

=== Final ===
The final was held on 23 May at 18:15.

Rank	Lane	Name	Nationality	Time	Notes
1st place, gold medalist(s)	4	Kristóf Milák	Hungary	50.18	CR, NR
2nd place, silver medalist(s)	3	Josif Miladinov	Bulgaria	50.93	NR
3rd place, bronze medalist(s)	5	James Guy	Great Britain	50.99	
4	6	Jakub Majerski	Poland	51.11	NR
5	8	Federico Burdisso	Italy	51.39	
6	1	Mikhail Vekovishchev	Russia	51.43	
7	2	Noè Ponti	Switzerland	51.45	
8	7	Szebasztián Szabó	Hungary	51.86	
