= Swimming at the 2020 European Aquatics Championships – Men's 200 metre butterfly =

Swimming competition

Men's 200 metre butterfly at the 2020 European Aquatics Championships
- Venue: Danube Arena
- Dates: 18 May 2021 (heats and semifinals); 19 May 2021 (final)
- Competitors: 36 from 21 nations
- Winning time: 1:51.10

Medalists
| gold medal | Kristóf Milák | Hungary |
| silver medal | Federico Burdisso | Italy |
| bronze medal | Tamás Kenderesi | Hungary |

The Men's 200 metre butterfly competition of the 2020 European Aquatics Championships was held on 18 and 19 May 2021.

== Records ==
Before the competition, the existing world, European and championship records were as follows.

| | Name | Nationality | Time | Location | Date |
|---|---|---|---|---|---|
| World record European record | Kristóf Milák | Hungary | 1:50.73 | Gwangju | 24 July 2019 |
| Championship record | Kristóf Milák | Hungary | 1:52.79 | Glasgow | 5 August 2018 |

The following new records were set during this competition.

| Date | Event | Name | Nationality | Time | Record |
|---|---|---|---|---|---|
| 19 May | Final | Kristóf Milák | Hungary | 1:51.10 | CR |

== Results ==
=== Heats ===
The heats were started on 18 May at 10:33.

| Rank | Heat | Lane | Name | Nationality | Time | Notes |
|---|---|---|---|---|---|---|
| 1 | 4 | 4 | Kristóf Milák | Hungary | 1:54.38 | Q |
| 2 | 3 | 3 | Antani Ivanov | Bulgaria | 1:54.72 | Q, NR |
| 3 | 2 | 3 | Krzysztof Chmielewski | Poland | 1:55.46 | Q |
| 4 | 2 | 6 | Noè Ponti | Switzerland | 1:55.67 | Q |
| 5 | 2 | 4 | Federico Burdisso | Italy | 1:55.73 | Q |
| 6 | 4 | 1 | Jakub Majerski | Poland | 1:56.27 | Q |
| 7 | 3 | 6 | Léon Marchand | France | 1:56.33 | Q |
| 8 | 4 | 7 | Giacomo Carini | Italy | 1:56.69 | Q |
| 9 | 3 | 4 | Tamás Kenderesi | Hungary | 1:57.02 | Q |
| 10 | 3 | 0 | Damian Chrzanowski | Poland | 1:57.18 | |
| 11 | 3 | 5 | Alexander Kudashev | Russia | 1:57.19 | Q |
| 12 | 4 | 6 | Louis Croenen | Belgium | 1:57.31 | Q |
| 13 | 4 | 5 | Denys Kesil | Ukraine | 1:57.32 | Q |
| 14 | 4 | 2 | Igor Troyanovskyy | Ukraine | 1:57.38 | Q |
| 15 | 3 | 1 | Kregor Zirk | Estonia | 1:57.56 | Q, NR |
| 16 | 1 | 7 | Alexei Sancov | Moldova | 1:57.78 | Q, NR |
| 17 | 3 | 2 | Ramon Klenz | Germany | 1:57.96 | Q |
| 18 | 4 | 3 | Michał Poprawa | Poland | 1:58.11 | |
| 19 | 4 | 8 | Ondřej Gemov | Czech Republic | 1:58.19 | |
| 20 | 2 | 8 | Joan Lluís Pons | Spain | 1:58.52 | |
| 21 | 3 | 8 | Adam Hlobeň | Czech Republic | 1:58.57 | |
| 22 | 2 | 5 | Bence Biczó | Hungary | 1:58.73 | |
| 23 | 4 | 0 | Dominik Márk Török | Hungary | 1:58.88 | |
| 24 | 2 | 1 | Edward Mildred | Great Britain | 1:59.04 | |
| 25 | 2 | 0 | Stefanos Dimitriadis | Greece | 1:59.32 | |
| 26 | 3 | 9 | Arbidel González | Spain | 1:59.64 | |
| 27 | 3 | 7 | Xaver Gschwentner | Austria | 1:59.66 | |
| 28 | 2 | 2 | Maksym Shemberev | Azerbaijan | 1:59.76 | |
| 29 | 2 | 7 | Sebastian Luňák | Czech Republic | 2:00.00 | |
| 30 | 1 | 4 | Marius Toscan | Switzerland | 2:01.20 | |
| 31 | 2 | 9 | Martin Espernberger | Austria | 2:01.79 | |
| 32 | 1 | 3 | Joao Soares Carneiro | Luxembourg | 2:01.92 | NR |
| 33 | 4 | 9 | Ramil Valizada | Azerbaijan | 2:04.80 | |
| 34 | 1 | 5 | Ievhen Khrypunov | Ukraine | 2:05.01 | |
| 35 | 1 | 6 | Davor Petrovski | North Macedonia | 2:05.75 | |
| 36 | 1 | 2 | Emilien Puyo | Monaco | 2:11.42 | |

=== Semifinals ===
The semifinals were held on 18 May at 18:39.

==== Semifinal 1 ====
| Rank | Lane | Name | Nationality | Time | Notes |
|---|---|---|---|---|---|
| 1 | 4 | Antani Ivanov | Bulgaria | 1:55.45 | Q |
| 2 | 5 | Noè Ponti | Switzerland | 1:55.81 | Q |
| 3 | 6 | Giacomo Carini | Italy | 1:55.87 | q |
| 4 | 2 | Alexander Kudashev | Russia | 1:56.43 | q |
| 5 | 1 | Kregor Zirk | Estonia | 1:56.63 | NR |
| 6 | 7 | Denys Kesil | Ukraine | 1:56.99 | |
| 7 | 3 | Jakub Majerski | Poland | 1:57.58 | |
| 8 | 8 | Ramon Klenz | Germany | 1:58.26 | |

==== Semifinal 2 ====
| Rank | Lane | Name | Nationality | Time | Notes |
|---|---|---|---|---|---|
| 1 | 2 | Tamás Kenderesi | Hungary | 1:54.37 | Q |
| 2 | 4 | Kristóf Milák | Hungary | 1:54.72 | Q |
| 3 | 3 | Federico Burdisso | Italy | 1:55.03 | q |
| 4 | 7 | Louis Croenen | Belgium | 1:55.96 | q |
| 5 | 5 | Krzysztof Chmielewski | Poland | 1:56.51 | |
| 6 | 1 | Igor Troyanovskyy | Ukraine | 1:56.96 | |
| 7 | 6 | Léon Marchand | France | 1:57.77 | |
| 8 | 8 | Alexei Sancov | Moldova | 1:57.85 | |

=== Final ===
The final was held on 19 May at 19:43.

| Rank | Lane | Name | Nationality | Time | Notes |
|---|---|---|---|---|---|
| 1st place, gold medalist(s) | 5 | Kristóf Milák | Hungary | 1:51.10 | CR |
| 2nd place, silver medalist(s) | 3 | Federico Burdisso | Italy | 1:54.28 | NR |
| 3rd place, bronze medalist(s) | 4 | Tamás Kenderesi | Hungary | 1:54.43 | |
| 4 | 6 | Antani Ivanov | Bulgaria | 1:54.50 | NR |
| 5 | 2 | Noè Ponti | Switzerland | 1:55.18 | |
| 6 | 1 | Louis Croenen | Belgium | 1:55.69 | |
| 7 | 8 | Alexander Kudashev | Russia | 1:56.33 | |
| 8 | 7 | Giacomo Carini | Italy | 1:56.69 | |
