= Swimming at the 2022 European Aquatics Championships – Men's 200 metre butterfly =

Men's 200 metre butterfly at the 2022 European Aquatics Championships
- Venue: Foro Italico
- Dates: 15 August (heats and semifinals); 16 August (final)
- Competitors: 26 from 15 nations
- Winning time: 1:52.01

Medalists
gold medal	Kristóf Milák	Hungary
silver medal	Richárd Márton	Hungary
bronze medal	Alberto Razzetti	Italy

The Men's 200 metre butterfly competition of the 2022 European Aquatics Championships was held on 15 and 16 August 2022.

== Records ==
Prior to the competition, the existing world, European and championship records were as follows.

	Name	Nationality	Time	Location	Date
World record European record	Kristóf Milák	Hungary	1:50.34	Budapest	21 June 2022
Championship record	Kristóf Milák	Hungary	1:51.10	Budapest	19 May 2021

== Results ==
=== Heats ===
The heats were started on 15 August at 09:36.

Rank	Heat	Lane	Name	Nationality	Time	Notes
1	3	4	Kristóf Milák	Hungary	1:54.97	Q
2	2	5	Alberto Razzetti	Italy	1:55.44	Q
3	1	3	Richárd Márton	Hungary	1:55.49	Q
4	3	3	Giacomo Carini	Italy	1:55.57	Q
5	1	4	Federico Burdisso	Italy	1:56.10	
6	1	5	Krzysztof Chmielewski	Poland	1:56.19	Q
7	1	2	Ondřej Gemov	Czech Republic	1:57.32	Q, NR
8	3	2	Antonino Faraci	Italy	1:57.54	
9	3	1	Dávid Verrasztó	Hungary	1:57.65	
10	2	3	Kregor Zirk	Estonia	1:57.91	Q
11	3	6	Denys Kesil	Ukraine	1:57.97	Q
12	2	7	Arbidel González	Spain	1:58.08	Q
13	2	4	Noè Ponti	Switzerland	1:58.09	Q
14	2	6	Michał Chmielewski	Poland	1:58.11	Q
15	1	6	Jan Zubik	Poland	1:58.32	
16	3	5	Antani Ivanov	Bulgaria	1:58.87	Q
17	1	1	Adrian Jaśkiewicz	Poland	1:58.96	
18	2	8	Marius Toscan	Switzerland	1:59.11	Q
19	1	7	Petar Mitsin	Bulgaria	1:59.40	Q
20	2	2	Mason Wilby	Great Britain	1:59.85	Q
21	3	7	Joan Lluís Pons	Spain	1:59.97	Q
22	3	8	Apostolos Siskos	Greece	2:00.85	
23	2	1	Jon Jøntvedt	Norway	2:01.67	
24	1	8	Richard Nagy	Slovakia	2:02.83	
25	3	0	Liam Custer	Ireland	2:06.66	
26	1	0	Alessandro Rebosio	San Marino	2:09.69	
	2	0	Finn McGeever	Ireland	Did not start	

=== Semifinals ===
The semifinals were started on 15 August at 18:57.

Rank	Heat	Lane	Name	Nationality	Time	Notes
1	2	4	Kristóf Milák	Hungary	1:53.97	Q
2	1	4	Alberto Razzetti	Italy	1:55.18	Q
3	1	2	Noè Ponti	Switzerland	1:55.28	Q
4	2	5	Richárd Márton	Hungary	1:55.36	Q
5	1	5	Giacomo Carini	Italy	1:55.61	q
6	2	3	Krzysztof Chmielewski	Poland	1:55.68	q
7	2	6	Kregor Zirk	Estonia	1:56.43	q
8	1	6	Denys Kesil	Ukraine	1:56.81	q
9	2	2	Arbidel González	Spain	1:57.42	
10	1	3	Ondřej Gemov	Czech Republic	1:57.67	
11	2	7	Michał Chmielewski	Poland	1:57.76	
12	1	7	Antani Ivanov	Bulgaria	1:57.90	
13	2	1	Marius Toscan	Switzerland	1:58.81	
14	1	8	Joan Lluís Pons	Spain	1:59.18	
15	1	1	Petar Mitsin	Bulgaria	1:59.39	
16	2	8	Mason Wilby	Great Britain	1:59.45	

=== Final ===
The final was held on 16 August at 18:00.

Rank	Lane	Name	Nationality	Time	Notes
1st place, gold medalist(s)	4	Kristóf Milák	Hungary	1:52.01	
2nd place, silver medalist(s)	6	Richárd Márton	Hungary	1:54.78	
3rd place, bronze medalist(s)	5	Alberto Razzetti	Italy	1:55.01	
4	2	Giacomo Carini	Italy	1:55.17	
5	3	Noè Ponti	Switzerland	1:55.26	
6	8	Denys Kesil	Ukraine	1:55.80	
6	1	Kregor Zirk	Estonia	1:55.80	
8	7	Krzysztof Chmielewski	Poland	1:56.43	
