= Swimming at the 2019 World Aquatics Championships – Men's 200 metre butterfly =

Men's 200 metre butterfly at the 2019 World Aquatics Championships
- Venue: Nambu University Municipal Aquatics Center
- Location: Gwangju, South Korea
- Dates: 23 July (heats and semifinals); 24 July (final)
- Competitors: 48 from 43 nations
- Winning time: 1:50.73 WR

Medalists
gold medal	Kristóf Milák	Hungary
silver medal	Daiya Seto	Japan
bronze medal	Chad le Clos	South Africa

The Men's 200 metre butterfly competition at the 2019 World Championships was held on 23 and 24 July 2019. The event was won by Kristóf Milák, who broke a 10-year-old record set by Michael Phelps, and set a new world-record time of 1:50.73 in the process.

== Records ==
Prior to the competition, the existing world and championship records were as follows.

World record	Michael Phelps (USA)	1:51.51	Rome, Italy	29 July 2009
Competition record	Michael Phelps (USA)	1:51.51	Rome, Italy	29 July 2009

The following new records were set during this competition.

Date	Event	Name	Nationality	Time	Record
24 July	Final	Kristóf Milák	Hungary	1:50.73	WR

== Results ==
=== Heats ===
The heats were held on 23 July at 10:45.

Rank	Heat	Lane	Name	Nationality	Time	Notes
1	5	4	Kristóf Milák	Hungary	1:54.19	Q
2	5	5	Daiya Seto	Japan	1:54.56	Q
3	5	2	Denys Kesil	Ukraine	1:55.82	Q
4	5	3	Leonardo de Deus	Brazil	1:56.05	Q
5	3	4	Chad le Clos	South Africa	1:56.17	Q
6	4	1	Antani Ivanov	Bulgaria	1:56.35	Q
6	5	1	Louis Croenen	Belgium	1:56.35	Q
8	4	3	Zach Harting	United States	1:56.42	Q
9	3	1	Matthew Temple	Australia	1:56.54	Q
10	3	5	Federico Burdisso	Italy	1:56.64	Q
11	4	4	Tamás Kenderesi	Hungary	1:56.82	Q
12	3	3	David Morgan	Australia	1:56.90	Q
13	4	6	Luiz Altamir Melo	Brazil	1:57.08	Q
14	5	8	Brendan Hyland	Ireland	1:57.09	Q, NR
15	5	7	Mackenzie Darragh	Canada	1:57.13	Q
16	3	2	Maksym Shemberev	Azerbaijan	1:57.14	Q
17	3	8	Velimir Stjepanović	Serbia	1:57.15	
18	4	5	Justin Wright	United States	1:57.18	
19	4	8	Wang Kuan-hung	Chinese Taipei	1:57.21	
20	4	2	David Thomasberger	Germany	1:57.31	
21	4	7	Jan Świtkowski	Poland	1:57.58	
22	2	4	Kregor Zirk	Estonia	1:58.04	NR
23	5	0	Joan Lluís Pons	Spain	1:58.44	
24	3	0	Sajan Prakash	India	1:58.45	
25	2	3	Adilbek Mussin	Kazakhstan	1:58.58	NR
26	3	6	Viktor Bromer	Denmark	1:58.59	
27	5	9	Quah Zheng Wen	Singapore	1:59.10	
28	2	1	Richard Nagy	Slovakia	1:59.29	NR
29	3	9	Luis Vega Torres	Cuba	1:59.94	
30	2	7	Jarod Arroyo	Puerto Rico	2:00.28	
31	2	9	Ayman Kelzi	Syria	2:00.59	NR
32	4	9	Kim Min-seop	South Korea	2:00.95	
33	2	2	Navaphat Wongcharoen	Thailand	2:01.40	
34	2	8	Nicholas Lim	Hong Kong	2:01.46	
35	1	3	Gabriel Araya	Chile	2:01.63	NR
36	1	4	Gustavo Gutiérrez	Peru	2:01.64	
37	5	6	Li Zhuhao	China	2:01.84	
38	2	5	Filip Zelić	Croatia	2:02.47	
39	2	6	Michael Gunning	Jamaica	2:02.89	
40	3	7	Wang Zhou	China	2:03.07	
41	1	6	Matthew Mays	Virgin Islands	2:03.47	NR
42	2	0	Faang der Tiaa	Malaysia	2:03.51	
43	1	5	Bryan Alvaréz	Costa Rica	2:04.71	
44	1	7	Davor Petrovski	North Macedonia	2:06.33	
45	1	2	Fernando Ponce	Guatemala	2:07.61	
46	1	8	Salvador Gordo	Angola	2:11.27	
47	1	1	Emilien Puyo	Monaco	2:15.13	
	1	0	Collins Saliboko	Tanzania	DSQ	
	4	0	Nils Liess	Switzerland	DNS	

=== Semifinals ===
The semifinals were held on 23 July at 21:35.

==== Semifinal 1 ====
Rank	Lane	Name	Nationality	Time	Notes
1	6	Zach Harting	United States	1:55.26	Q
2	4	Daiya Seto	Japan	1:55.33	Q
3	5	Leonardo de Deus	Brazil	1:55.71	Q
4	2	Federico Burdisso	Italy	1:55.92	Q
5	3	Antani Ivanov	Bulgaria	1:56.25	QSO
6	1	Brendan Hyland	Ireland	1:56.55	NR
7	8	Maksym Shemberev	Azerbaijan	1:56.78	
8	7	David Morgan	Australia	1:59.57	

==== Semifinal 2 ====
Rank	Lane	Name	Nationality	Time	Notes
1	4	Kristóf Milák	Hungary	1:52.96	Q
2	3	Chad le Clos	South Africa	1:55.88	Q
3	5	Denys Kesil	Ukraine	1:55.95	Q
4	7	Tamás Kenderesi	Hungary	1:56.25	QSO
5	2	Matthew Temple	Australia	1:56.52	
6	1	Luiz Altamir Melo	Brazil	1:57.43	
7	8	Mackenzie Darragh	Canada	1:57.89	
8	6	Louis Croenen	Belgium	1:59.12	

==== Swim-off ====
The swim-off was held on 24 July at 10:00.

Rank	Lane	Name	Nationality	Time	Notes
1	5	Tamás Kenderesi	Hungary	1:59.39	Q
2	4	Antani Ivanov	Bulgaria	1:59.52	

=== Final ===
The final was held on 24 July at 20:47.

Rank	Lane	Name	Nationality	Time	Notes
1st place, gold medalist(s)	4	Kristóf Milák	Hungary	1:50.73	WR
2nd place, silver medalist(s)	3	Daiya Seto	Japan	1:53.86	
3rd place, bronze medalist(s)	2	Chad le Clos	South Africa	1:54.15	
4	7	Federico Burdisso	Italy	1:54.39	NR
5	1	Denys Kesil	Ukraine	1:54.79	NR
6	5	Zach Harting	United States	1:55.69	
7	6	Leonardo de Deus	Brazil	1:55.96	
8	8	Tamás Kenderesi	Hungary	1:57.10	
