= Swimming at the 2020 Summer Olympics – Men's 200 metre butterfly =

Men's 200 metre butterfly at the Games of the XXXII Olympiad
- Venue: Tokyo Aquatics Centre
- Dates: 26 July 2021 (heats); 27 July 2021 (semifinals); 28 July 2021 (final)
- Competitors: 38 from 30 nations
- Winning time: 1:51.25 OR

Medalists
1st place, gold medalist(s)		Kristóf Milák	Hungary
2nd place, silver medalist(s)		Tomoru Honda	Japan
3rd place, bronze medalist(s)		Federico Burdisso	Italy

The men's 200 metre butterfly event at the 2020 Summer Olympics was held in 2021 at the Tokyo Aquatics Centre. It was the event's seventeenth consecutive appearance, having been held at every edition since 1956.

== Summary ==
After breaking Michael Phelps' decade-long world record in the event in 2019, Hungary's Kristóf Milák finally won his first individual Olympic title. Overcoming a suit malfunction minutes before the start of the race, Milák dominated the race to win gold in an Olympic record of 1:51.25. Despite overhauling the field by more than two seconds, Milák expressed disappointment in not breaking the world record due to his suit change.

Fourth at the final turn, Japan's Tomoru Honda rallied to join Milák on the podium and deliver the host nation a silver medal in 1:53.73. Meanwhile, Italy's Federico Burdisso moved from third to second at the 150 m mark, but could not hold off Honda in the final lap, settling for bronze in 1:54.45. Hungary's Tamás Kenderesi (1:54.52) eclipsed South Africa's 2012 champion Chad le Clos (1:54.93), who faded in the closing stages after commanding a brief lead, by 0.41 seconds to take fourth. Outside the 1:54 club, Brazil's Leonardo de Deus (1:55.19), the U.S.' Gunnar Bentz (1:55.46) and Poland's Krzysztof Chmielewski (1:55.88) rounded out the championship field.

Notably, it marked the first time in the 21st century where U.S. great Michael Phelps did not appear in the event as he retired in 2016.

== Records ==
Prior to this competition, the existing world and Olympic records were as follows.

World record	Kristóf Milák (HUN)	1:50.73	Gwangju, South Korea	24 July 2019
Olympic record	Michael Phelps (USA)	1:52.03	Beijing, China	13 August 2008

The following record was established during the competition:

Date	Event	Swimmer	Nation	Time	Record
July 28	Final	Kristóf Milák	Hungary	1:51.25	OR

== Qualification ==
The Olympic Qualifying Time for the event is 1:56.48. Up to two swimmers per National Olympic Committee (NOC) can automatically qualify by swimming that time at an approved qualification event. The Olympic Selection Time is 1:59.97. Up to one swimmer per NOC meeting that time is eligible for selection, allocated by world ranking until the maximum quota for all swimming events is reached. NOCs without a male swimmer qualified in any event can also use their universality place.

== Competition format ==
The competition consists of three rounds: heats, semifinals, and a final. The swimmers with the best 16 times in the heats advance to the semifinals. The swimmers with the best 8 times in the semifinals advance to the final. Swim-offs are used as necessary to break ties for advancement to the next round.

== Schedule ==
All times are Japan standard time (UTC+9)

Date	Time	Round
26 July 2021	19:17	Heats
27 July 2021	11:35	Semifinals
28 July 2021	10:49	Final

== Results ==
=== Heats ===
The swimmers with the top 16 times, regardless of heat, advance to the semifinals.

Rank	Heat	Lane	Swimmer	Nation	Time	Notes
1	5	4	Kristóf Milák	Hungary	1:53.58	Q
2	4	3	Wang Kuan-hung	Chinese Taipei	1:54.44	Q, NR
3	5	7	Leonardo de Deus	Brazil	1:54.83	Q
4	4	6	Zach Harting	United States	1:54.92	Q
5	3	6	Noè Ponti	Switzerland	1:55.05	Q, NR
6	5	3	Tomoru Honda	Japan	1:55.10	Q
7	4	5	Federico Burdisso	Italy	1:55.14	Q
8	3	4	Tamás Kenderesi	Hungary	1:55.18	Q
9	4	4	Daiya Seto	Japan	1:55.26	Q
10	3	1	Giacomo Carini	Italy	1:55.33	Q
11	3	2	Gunnar Bentz	United States	1:55.46	Q
12	4	7	Aleksandr Kudashev	ROC	1:55.54	Q
13	5	1	Krzysztof Chmielewski	Poland	1:55.77	Q
14	4	1	Louis Croenen	Belgium	1:55.78	Q
15	3	7	Léon Marchand	France	1:55.85	Q
16	5	5	Chad le Clos	South Africa	1:55.96	Q
17	5	6	David Thomasberger	Germany	1:56.04	
18	5	2	Matthew Temple	Australia	1:56.25	
19	2	1	Tomoe Zenimoto Hvas	Norway	1:56.30	NR
20	3	5	Antani Ivanov	Bulgaria	1:56.36	
21	3	3	Denys Kesyl	Ukraine	1:56.37	
22	2	6	Quah Zheng Wen	Singapore	1:56.42	
23	2	3	Brendan Hyland	Ireland	1:57.09	
24	2	4	Sajan Prakash	India	1:57.22	
25	2	2	Kregor Zirk	Estonia	1:57.26	
26	2	7	Alexei Sancov	Moldova	1:57.55	NR
27	3	8	Jakub Majerski	Poland	1:57.91	
28	4	8	Moon Seung-woo	South Korea	1:58.09	
29	2	5	Ihor Troianovskyi	Ukraine	1:58.37	
30	5	8	Ethan du Preez	South Africa	1:58.50	
31	2	8	Luis Vega Torres	Cuba	1:59.00	
32	1	6	Ayman Kelzi	Syria	1:59.57	NR
33	1	2	Matin Balsini	Iran	1:59.97	NR
34	1	3	Keanan Dols	Jamaica	2:00.25	
35	4	2	David Morgan	Australia	2:00.27	
36	1	5	Navaphat Wongcharoen	Thailand	2:01.43	
37	1	4	Richard Nagy	Slovakia	2:01.91	
38	1	7	Simon Bachmann	Seychelles	2:03.54	

=== Semifinals ===
The swimmers with the best 8 times, regardless of heat, advanced to the final.

Rank	Heat	Lane	Swimmer	Nation	Time	Notes
1	2	4	Kristóf Milák	Hungary	1:52.22	Q
2	2	5	Leonardo de Deus	Brazil	1:54.97	Q
3	1	8	Chad le Clos	South Africa	1:55.06	Q
4	2	6	Federico Burdisso	Italy	1:55.11	Q
5	1	6	Tamás Kenderesi	Hungary	1:55.17	Q
6	2	7	Gunnar Bentz	United States	1:55.28	Q
7	2	1	Krzysztof Chmielewski	Poland	1:55.29	Q
8	1	3	Tomoru Honda	Japan	1:55.31	Q
9	1	5	Zach Harting	United States	1:55.35	
10	2	3	Noè Ponti	Switzerland	1:55.37	
11	2	2	Daiya Seto	Japan	1:55.50	
12	1	7	Aleksandr Kudashev	ROC	1:55.51	
13	1	4	Wang Kuan-hung	Chinese Taipei	1:55.52	
14	2	8	Léon Marchand	France	1:55.68	
15	1	2	Giacomo Carini	Italy	1:55.95	
16	1	1	Louis Croenen	Belgium	1:56.67	

=== Final ===
Rank	Lane	Name	Nation	Time	Notes
1st place, gold medalist(s)	4	Kristóf Milák	Hungary	1:51.25	OR
2nd place, silver medalist(s)	8	Tomoru Honda	Japan	1:53.73	
3rd place, bronze medalist(s)	6	Federico Burdisso	Italy	1:54.45	
4	2	Tamás Kenderesi	Hungary	1:54.52	
5	3	Chad le Clos	South Africa	1:54.93	
6	5	Leonardo de Deus	Brazil	1:55.19	
7	7	Gunnar Bentz	United States	1:55.46	
8	1	Krzysztof Chmielewski	Poland	1:55.88	
