= Swimming at the 2018 Summer Youth Olympics – Boys' 200 metre butterfly =

Boys' 200 metre butterfly at the 2018 Summer Youth Olympics
- Venue: Natatorium
- Dates: 12 October
- Competitors: 36 from 34 nations
- Winning time: 1:54.89

Medalists
gold medal	Kristóf Milák	Hungary
silver medal	Denys Kesil	Ukraine
bronze medal	Federico Burdisso	Italy

The boys' 200 metre butterfly event at the 2018 Summer Youth Olympics took place on 12 October at the Natatorium in Buenos Aires, Argentina.

== Results ==
=== Heats ===
The heats were started at 10:32.

Rank	Heat	Lane	Name	Nationality	Time	Notes
1	3	4	Denys Kesil	Ukraine	1:57.70	Q
2	5	4	Kristóf Milák	Hungary	1:58.07	Q
3	5	5	Wang Kuan-hung	Chinese Taipei	1:58.71	Q
4	4	4	Federico Burdisso	Italy	1:59.78	Q
5	4	5	Park Jung-hun	South Korea	2:00.52	Q
6	5	2	Ferran Siré	Spain	2:01.39	Q
7	4	7	Shinnosuke Ishikawa	Japan	2:01.47	Q
8	3	3	Jake Johnson	United States	2:01.62	Q
9	5	6	Noè Ponti	Switzerland	2:01.66	
10	4	2	Ihor Troianovskyi	Ukraine	2:01.80	
11	5	3	Shen Jiahao	China	2:01.81	
12	3	6	Adam Hlobeň	Czech Republic	2:02.48	
13	5	1	Ethan du Preez	South Africa	2:02.76	
14	4	3	Ong Jung Yi	Singapore	2:02.99	
15	3	5	Maurice Ingenrieth	Germany	2:03.13	
16	5	7	Ivan Shamshurin	Belarus	2:03.19	
17	2	3	Enrique Andrade	Venezuela	2:03.56	
18	4	6	Jarod Arroyo	Puerto Rico	2:03.61	
19	2	5	Nicholas Lim	Hong Kong	2:04.08	
20	1	5	Efe Turan	Turkey	2:04.65	
21	2	8	Kael Yorke	Trinidad and Tobago	2:05.03	
22	2	4	Adrián Paseta	Peru	2:05.05	
23	4	8	Joshua Liendo	Canada	2:05.11	
24	4	1	Jakub Majerski	Poland	2:05.27	
25	3	8	Gal Kordež	Slovenia	2:05.62	
26	3	1	Mohamed Ahmed Mohamed	Egypt	2:05.79	
27	2	6	Sarith Petchakul	Thailand	2:05.83	
28	3	2	Dominik Karačić	Croatia	2:06.43	
29	5	8	Low Zheng Yong	Malaysia	2:06.87	
30	2	7	Azel Zelmi Aryalingga	Indonesia	2:06.88	
31	1	3	Benjamin Schnapp	Chile	2:07.86	
32	3	7	Tihomir Todorov	Bulgaria	2:08.22	
33	1	6	Joaquín González	Argentina	2:08.57	
34	1	4	Moncef Aymen Balamane	Algeria	2:08.73	
35	2	2	Jeerakit Soammanus	Thailand	2:12.02	
36	1	2	Emilien Puyo	Monaco	2:19.20	
	2	1	Robin Hanson	Sweden	DNS	

=== Final ===
The final was held at 18:51.

Rank	Lane	Name	Nationality	Time	Notes
1st place, gold medalist(s)	5	Kristóf Milák	Hungary	1:54.89	
2nd place, silver medalist(s)	4	Denys Kesil	Ukraine	1:55.89	
3rd place, bronze medalist(s)	6	Federico Burdisso	Italy	1:57.16	
4	3	Wang Kuan-hung	Chinese Taipei	1:57.45	
5	2	Park Jung-hun	South Korea	1:58.67	
6	1	Shinnosuke Ishikawa	Japan	1:59.42	
7	7	Ferran Siré	Spain	2:01.88	
8	8	Jake Johnson	United States	2:02.10	
