= Swimming at the 2017 World Aquatics Championships – Men's 200 metre butterfly =

Men's 200 metre butterfly at the 2017 World Aquatics Championships
- Venue: Danube Arena
- Location: Budapest, Hungary
- Dates: 25 July (heats and semifinals); 26 July (final)
- Competitors: 44 from 39 nations
- Winning time: 1:53.33

Medalists
gold medal	Chad le Clos	South Africa
silver medal	László Cseh	Hungary
bronze medal	Daiya Seto	Japan

The Men's 200 metre butterfly competition at the 2017 World Championships was held on 25 and 26 July 2017.

== Records ==
Prior to the competition, the existing world and championship records were as follows.

World record	Michael Phelps (USA)	1:51.51	Rome, Italy	29 July 2009
Competition record	Michael Phelps (USA)	1:51.51	Rome, Italy	29 July 2009

== Results ==
=== Heats ===
The heats were held on 25 July at 10:12.

Rank	Heat	Lane	Name	Nationality	Time	Notes
1	5	4	László Cseh	Hungary	1:54.08	Q
2	4	5	Daiya Seto	Japan	1:54.89	Q
3	5	6	Viktor Bromer	Denmark	1:55.13	Q
4	4	8	Antani Ivanov	Bulgaria	1:55.55	Q NR
5	5	5	Chad le Clos	South Africa	1:55.90	Q
6	4	4	Masato Sakai	Japan	1:55.94	Q
7	3	4	Tamás Kenderesi	Hungary	1:55.96	Q
8	3	5	Jack Conger	United States	1:56.00	Q
9	4	7	Daniil Pakhomov	Russia	1:56.07	Q
10	4	2	Jan Świtkowski	Poland	1:56.20	Q
11	5	3	Pace Clark	United States	1:56.23	Q
12	4	6	Giacomo Carini	Italy	1:56.52	Q
13	3	6	David Morgan	Australia	1:56.57	Q
14	3	7	Jonathan Gómez	Colombia	1:56.60	Q NR
15	5	2	Grant Irvine	Australia	1:56.61	Q
16	4	3	Leonardo de Deus	Brazil	1:56.71	Q
17	5	7	Louis Croenen	Belgium	1:56.75	
18	3	2	Quah Zheng Wen	Singapore	1:56.76	
19	4	1	Marcos Lavado	Venezuela	1:57.37	
20	3	8	Nils Liess	Switzerland	1:57.96	
21	3	3	Li Zhuhao	China	1:58.63	
22	5	8	Wang Zhou	China	1:58.88	
23	3	1	Miguel Nascimento	Portugal	1:59.02	
24	5	1	Stefanos Dimitriadis	Greece	1:59.07	
25	5	9	Patrick Stäber	Austria	1:59.10	
26	3	0	Joan Lluís Pons	Spain	1:59.41	
27	3	9	Etay Gurevich	Israel	1:59.87	
28	5	0	Brendan Hyland	Ireland	1:59.91	
29	2	2	Bradlee Ashby	New Zealand	2:00.53	
30	2	4	Sajan Prakash	India	2:00.57	
31	2	1	Deividas Margevičius	Lithuania	2:00.63	NR
32	4	0	Tomáš Havránek	Czech Republic	2:01.50	
33	4	9	Kim Moon-kee	South Korea	2:02.31	
34	2	8	Ayman Kelzi	Syria	2:01.44	
35	2	7	Chou Wei-liang	Chinese Taipei	2:01.49	
36	2	5	Michael Gunning	Jamaica	2:01.73	
37	2	3	Luis Martínez	Guatemala	2:03.10	
38	2	6	Lazaro Vergara	Cuba	2:03.19	
39	1	3	Nguyễn Ngọc Huỳnh	Vietnam	2:03.57	
40	1	4	Rami Anis	FINA Independent Athletes	2:06.02	
41	2	9	Matthew Lowe	Bahamas	2:06.29	
42	1	6	Mikhail Umnov	Malta	2:06.45	
43	2	0	Jeerakit Soammanus	Thailand	2:07.30	
44	1	5	Duran Alfonso	Honduras	2:12.21	

=== Semifinals ===
The semifinals were held on 25 July at 19:04.

==== Semifinal 1 ====
Rank	Lane	Name	Nationality	Time	Notes
1	4	Daiya Seto	Japan	1:54.03	Q
2	6	Jack Conger	United States	1:55.30	Q
3	3	Masato Sakai	Japan	1:55.57	Q
4	5	Antani Ivanov	Bulgaria	1:55.58	Q
5	2	Jan Świtkowski	Poland	1:55.84	
6	7	Giacomo Carini	Italy	1:56.59	
7	8	Leonardo de Deus	Brazil	1:56.85	
8	1	Jonathan Gómez	Colombia	1:57.60	

==== Semifinal 2 ====
Rank	Lane	Name	Nationality	Time	Notes
1	4	László Cseh	Hungary	1:54.22	Q
2	6	Tamás Kenderesi	Hungary	1:54.98	Q
3	3	Chad le Clos	South Africa	1:55.09	Q
4	5	Viktor Bromer	Denmark	1:55.39	Q
5	7	Pace Clark	United States	1:55.82	
6	2	Daniil Pakhomov	Russia	1:55.84	
7	8	Grant Irvine	Australia	1:56.33	
8	1	David Morgan	Australia	1:57.66	

=== Final ===
The final was held on 26 July at 18:01.

Rank	Lane	Name	Nationality	Time	Notes
1st place, gold medalist(s)	6	Chad le Clos	South Africa	1:53.33	
2nd place, silver medalist(s)	5	László Cseh	Hungary	1:53.72	
3rd place, bronze medalist(s)	4	Daiya Seto	Japan	1:54.21	
4	3	Tamás Kenderesi	Hungary	1:54.73	
5	2	Jack Conger	United States	1:54.88	
6	1	Masato Sakai	Japan	1:55.04	
7	7	Viktor Bromer	Denmark	1:55.30	
8	8	Antani Ivanov	Bulgaria	1:55.98	
