= Swimming at the 2022 European Aquatics Championships – Men's 100 metre butterfly =

Men's 100 metre butterfly at the 2022 European Aquatics Championships
- Venue: Foro Italico
- Dates: 13 August (heats and semifinals); 14 August (final)
- Competitors: 53 from 28 nations
- Winning time: 50.33

Medalists
gold medal	Kristóf Milák	Hungary
silver medal	Noè Ponti	Switzerland
bronze medal	Jakub Majerski	Poland

The Men's 100 metre butterfly competition of the 2022 European Aquatics Championships was held on 13 and 14 August 2022.

== Records ==
Prior to the competition, the existing world, European and championship records were as follows.

	Name	Nationality	Time	Location	Date
World record	Caeleb Dressel	United States	49.45	Tokyo	31 July 2021
European record	Kristóf Milák	Hungary	49.68	Tokyo	31 July 2021
Championship record	Kristóf Milák	Hungary	50.18	Budapest	23 May 2021

== Results ==
=== Heats ===
The heats were started on 13 August at 09:15.

Rank	Heat	Lane	Name	Nationality	Time	Notes
1	5	4	Noè Ponti	Switzerland	51.56	Q
2	6	3	Nyls Korstanje	Netherlands	51.81	Q
3	6	4	Kristóf Milák	Hungary	51.82	Q
4	5	6	Hubert Kós	Hungary	51.88	Q
5	6	6	Matteo Rivolta	Italy	51.90	Q
6	4	5	Federico Burdisso	Italy	51.95	Q
7	5	5	Simon Bucher	Austria	52.19	Q
7	4	2	Edward Mildred	Great Britain	52.19	Q
9	4	4	Jakub Majerski	Poland	52.21	Q
10	4	3	Piero Codia	Italy	52.26	
11	6	5	Josif Miladinov	Bulgaria	52.27	Q
12	6	2	Adrian Jaśkiewicz	Poland	52.30	Q
13	5	3	Jacob Peters	Great Britain	52.35	Q
14	6	7	Diogo Ribeiro	Portugal	52.38	Q
15	5	7	Clément Secchi	France	52.56	Q
16	4	6	Jan Šefl	Czech Republic	52.67	Q
17	6	9	Mario Mollà	Spain	52.68	QSO
17	4	9	Andreas Vazaios	Greece	52.68	QSO
19	5	8	Alex Ahtiainen	Estonia	52.82	
20	4	1	Lorenzo Gargani	Italy	52.84	
21	4	7	Alberto Lozano	Spain	52.86	
22	4	0	Kregor Zirk	Estonia	52.95	
23	5	2	Daniel Zaitsev	Estonia	53.06	
24	3	2	Denys Kesil	Ukraine	53.24	
25	4	8	Konstantinos Stamou	Greece	53.31	
26	3	4	Brendan Hyland	Ireland	53.36	
27	6	0	Björn Kammann	Germany	53.76	
27	5	0	Đurđe Matić	Serbia	53.76	
29	5	9	Mateusz Chowaniec	Poland	53.87	
29	2	3	Thomas Piron	France	53.87	
31	3	6	Arbidel González	Spain	53.90	
32	3	5	Oskar Hoff	Sweden	53.91	
33	3	7	Michał Chmielewski	Poland	53.96	
34	6	1	Nikola Miljenić	Croatia	54.09	
35	3	3	Armin Evert Lelle	Estonia	54.10	
36	3	0	Julius Munk	Denmark	54.23	
37	2	7	Mason Wilby	Great Britain	54.28	
38	5	1	Shane Ryan	Ireland	54.29	
39	6	8	Max McCusker	Ireland	54.36	
40	3	1	Theodoros Andreopoulos	Greece	54.43	
41	2	2	Ondřej Gemov	Czech Republic	54.54	
42	2	6	Artur Barseghyan	Armenia	54.63	
43	3	9	Ádám Halás	Slovakia	54.77	
44	3	8	Valentyn Nesterkin	Ukraine	54.84	
45	2	4	Oleksii Khnykin	Ukraine	54.92	
46	2	1	Tomàs Lomero	Andorra	55.32	
47	2	9	Símon Elías Statkevicius	Iceland	55.38	
48	2	8	Emil Hassling	Sweden	55.67	
49	2	5	Tobias Dan Hansen	Denmark	56.05	
50	1	4	Ronens Kermans	Latvia	56.44	
51	1	5	Alessandro Rebosio	San Marino	56.52	
52	2	0	Bernat Lomero	Andorra	57.01	
53	1	3	Endi Kola	Albania	1:00.42	

=== Swim-off ===
The swim-off was held on 13 August at 10:16.

Rank	Lane	Name	Nationality	Time	Notes
1	4	Mario Mollà	Spain	52.07	Q
2	5	Andreas Vazaios	Greece	52.71	

=== Semifinals ===
The semifinals were started on 13 August at 18:34.

Rank	Heat	Lane	Name	Nationality	Time	Notes
1	2	5	Kristóf Milák	Hungary	51.01	Q
2	2	4	Noè Ponti	Switzerland	51.16	Q
3	1	4	Nyls Korstanje	Netherlands	51.46	Q
4	2	2	Jakub Majerski	Poland	51.58	q
5	2	1	Diogo Ribeiro	Portugal	51.61	q, NR
5	2	3	Matteo Rivolta	Italy	51.61	q
7	1	6	Simon Bucher	Austria	51.62	Q
8	1	5	Hubert Kós	Hungary	51.69	q
9	2	6	Edward Mildred	Great Britain	51.79	
10	1	3	Federico Burdisso	Italy	51.82	
11	1	1	Clément Secchi	France	52.10	
12	1	2	Josif Miladinov	Bulgaria	52.34	
13	1	7	Jacob Peters	Great Britain	52.52	
14	2	7	Adrian Jaśkiewicz	Poland	52.68	
15	2	8	Jan Šefl	Czech Republic	52.95	
16	1	8	Mario Mollà	Spain	53.13	

=== Final ===
The final was held on 14 August at 18:00.

Rank	Lane	Name	Nationality	Time	Notes
1st place, gold medalist(s)	4	Kristóf Milák	Hungary	50.33	
2nd place, silver medalist(s)	5	Noè Ponti	Switzerland	50.87	
3rd place, bronze medalist(s)	6	Jakub Majerski	Poland	51.22	
4	8	Hubert Kós	Hungary	51.33	
5	1	Simon Bucher	Austria	51.44	
6	2	Matteo Rivolta	Italy	51.68	
7	3	Nyls Korstanje	Netherlands	51.79	
8	7	Diogo Ribeiro	Portugal	52.28	
