= Swimming at the 2018 European Aquatics Championships – Men's 200 metre butterfly =

Men's 200 metre butterfly at the 2018 European Aquatics Championships
- Venue: Tollcross International Swimming Centre
- Dates: 4 August (heats and semifinals); 5 August (final)
- Competitors: 27 from 24 nations
- Winning time: 1:52.79

Medalists
gold medal	Kristóf Milák	Hungary
silver medal	Tamás Kenderesi	Hungary
bronze medal	Federico Burdisso	Italy

The Men's 200 metre butterfly competition of the 2018 European Aquatics Championships was held on 4 and 5 August 2018.

== Records ==
Prior to the competition, the existing world and championship records were as follows.

	Name	Nation	Time	Location	Date
World record	Michael Phelps	United States	1:51.51	Rome	29 July 2009
European record	László Cseh	Hungary	1:52.70	Beijing	13 August 2008
Championship record	László Cseh	Hungary	1:52.91	London	19 May 2016

The following new records were set during this competition.

Date	Event	Name	Nationality	Time	Record
5 August	Final	Kristóf Milák	Hungary	1:52.79	CR

== Results ==
=== Heats ===
The heats were started on 4 August at 10:03.

Rank	Heat	Lane	Name	Nationality	Time	Notes
1	4	4	Kristóf Milák	Hungary	1:54.17	Q
2	2	4	Tamás Kenderesi	Hungary	1:54.91	Q
3	2	3	Bence Biczó	Hungary	1:55.86	
4	4	5	Viktor Bromer	Denmark	1:55.90	Q
5	3	4	László Cseh	Hungary	1:55.91	
6	3	3	James Guy	Great Britain	1:56.13	Q
7	3	5	Antani Ivanov	Bulgaria	1:56.33	Q
8	3	6	Louis Croenen	Belgium	1:57.11	Q
9	4	6	Federico Burdisso	Italy	1:57.39	Q
10	2	2	Brendan Hyland	Ireland	1:57.55	Q
11	4	3	Jan Świtkowski	Poland	1:57.65	Q
12	3	1	Maksym Shemberev	Azerbaijan	1:57.84	Q
13	2	5	Ramon Klenz	Germany	1:57.91	Q
14	4	8	Miguel Nascimento	Portugal	1:58.23	Q
15	3	2	Filippo Berlincioni	Italy	1:58.66	Q
16	4	7	Patrick Staber	Austria	1:58.96	Q
17	2	7	Nils Liess	Switzerland	1:59.17	Q
18	3	7	Joan Lluís Pons	Spain	1:59.33	Q
19	3	8	Xaver Gschwentner	Austria	1:59.36	
20	4	0	Noè Ponti	Switzerland	1:59.41	
21	2	1	Etay Gurevich	Israel	1:59.62	
22	2	8	Filip Zelić	Croatia	2:00.04	
23	1	4	Richard Nagy	Slovakia	2:00.22	
24	4	2	Jacob Peters	Great Britain	2:00.40	
25	3	9	Petr Novák	Czech Republic	2:00.84	
26	2	9	Kregor Zirk	Estonia	2:01.14	
26	4	9	Samet Alkan	Turkey	2:01.14	
28	3	0	Deividas Margevičius	Lithuania	2:01.62	
29	2	0	Paul Espernberger	Austria	2:03.12	
30	1	5	Yauhen Tsurkin	Belarus	2:04.84	
31	1	6	Rasim Gör	Turkey	2:06.32	
32	1	3	Joshua Gold	Estonia	2:06.45	
33	1	2	Ergecan Gezmiş	Turkey	2:06.75	
34	1	7	Cevin Siim	Estonia	2:07.19	
35	1	8	Armin Lelle	Estonia	2:09.86	
36	1	1	Sergey Kuznetsov	Finland	2:10.82	
—	4	1	Nans Roch	France	Disqualified	

=== Semifinals ===
The semifinals were held on 4 August at 17:40.

==== Semifinal 1 ====
Rank	Lane	Name	Nationality	Time	Notes
1	4	Tamás Kenderesi	Hungary	1:55.26	Q
2	5	James Guy	Great Britain	1:56.16	Q
3	2	Maksym Shemberev	Azerbaijan	1:56.21	Q, NR
4	3	Louis Croenen	Belgium	1:56.58	Q
5	6	Brendan Hyland	Ireland	1:57.38	NR
6	7	Miguel Nascimento	Portugal	1:58.26	
7	8	Joan Lluís Pons	Spain	1:58.28	
8	1	Patrick Staber	Austria	1:59.46	

==== Semifinal 2 ====
Rank	Lane	Name	Nationality	Time	Notes
1	4	Kristóf Milák	Hungary	1:55.48	Q
2	5	Viktor Bromer	Denmark	1:55.83	Q
3	3	Antani Ivanov	Bulgaria	1:56.68	Q
4	2	Jan Świtkowski	Poland	1:56.87	Q
5	6	Federico Burdisso	Italy	1:57.20	
6	7	Ramon Klenz	Germany	1:57.47	
7	8	Nils Liess	Switzerland	1:57.91	
8	1	Filippo Berlincioni	Italy	1:58.09	

=== Final ===
The final was started on 5 August at 18:45.

Rank	Lane	Name	Nationality	Time	Notes
1st place, gold medalist(s)	5	Kristóf Milák	Hungary	1:52.79	CR
2nd place, silver medalist(s)	4	Tamás Kenderesi	Hungary	1:54.36	
3rd place, bronze medalist(s)	8	Federico Burdisso	Italy	1:55.97	
4	3	Viktor Bromer	Denmark	1:56.33	
4	2	Louis Croenen	Belgium	1:56.33	
6	1	Jan Świtkowski	Poland	1:56.53	
7	6	Maksym Shemberev	Azerbaijan	1:56.73	
8	7	Antani Ivanov	Bulgaria	1:57.88	
