= Swimming at the 2018 Summer Youth Olympics – Boys' 100 metre butterfly =

Boys' 100 metre butterfly at the 2018 Summer Youth Olympics
- Venue: Natatorium
- Dates: 8 October (heats, semifinals); 9 October (final)
- Competitors: 46 from 43 nations
- Winning time: 51.12

Medalists
| gold medal | Andrei Minakov | Russia |
| silver medal | Kristóf Milák | Hungary |
| bronze medal | Federico Burdisso | Italy |

The boys' 100 metre butterfly event at the 2018 Summer Youth Olympics took place on 8 and 9 October at the Natatorium in Buenos Aires, Argentina.

== Results ==
=== Heats ===
The heats were started on 8 October at 10:30.

| Rank | Heat | Lane | Name | Nationality | Time | Notes |
|---|---|---|---|---|---|---|
| 1 | 4 | 4 | Andrei Minakov | Russia | 52.47 | Q |
| 2 | 6 | 4 | Kristóf Milák | Hungary | 53.08 | Q |
| 3 | 5 | 4 | Federico Burdisso | Italy | 53.13 | Q |
| 3 | 5 | 5 | Jakub Majerski | Poland | 53.13 | Q |
| 5 | 5 | 3 | Daniel Cristian Martin | Romania | 53.33 | Q |
| 6 | 4 | 3 | Shen Jiahao | China | 53.43 | Q |
| 7 | 6 | 5 | Shinnosuke Ishikawa | Japan | 53.57 | Q |
| 8 | 6 | 2 | Denys Kesil | Ukraine | 53.69 | Q |
| 9 | 6 | 3 | Noè Ponti | Switzerland | 53.71 | Q |
| 10 | 6 | 1 | Daniil Markov | Russia | 53.91 | Q |
| 11 | 4 | 6 | Ihor Troianovskyi | Ukraine | 53.94 | Q |
| 12 | 3 | 3 | Park Jung-hun | South Korea | 53.95 | Q |
| 13 | 4 | 1 | Wang Kuan-hung | Chinese Taipei | 53.99 | Q |
| 14 | 5 | 6 | Sergueï Comte | France | 54.11 | Q |
| 15 | 4 | 2 | Ong Jung Yi | Singapore | 54.21 | Q |
| 16 | 5 | 2 | Jake Johnson | United States | 54.25 | Q |
| 17 | 6 | 6 | Luca Nik Armbruster | Germany | 54.51 | |
| 18 | 3 | 4 | Abeiku Jackson | Ghana | 54.52 | |
| 19 | 4 | 7 | Maurice Ingenrieth | Germany | 54.56 | |
| 19 | 5 | 7 | Joshua Liendo | Canada | 54.56 | |
| 21 | 6 | 7 | Tihomir Todorov | Bulgaria | 54.67 | |
| 22 | 3 | 7 | Nicholas Lim | Hong Kong | 55.02 | |
| 23 | 3 | 5 | Alex Ahtiainen | Estonia | 55.05 | |
| 24 | 6 | 8 | Gal Cohen Groumi | Israel | 55.22 | |
| 25 | 5 | 8 | Ivan Shamshurin | Belarus | 55.23 | |
| 26 | 3 | 1 | Gal Kordež | Slovenia | 55.32 | |
| 27 | 2 | 4 | Guillermo Cruz | Mexico | 55.46 | |
| 28 | 5 | 1 | Kael Yorke | Trinidad and Tobago | 55.72 | |
| 29 | 2 | 6 | Benjamin Schnapp | Chile | 55.75 | |
| 30 | 3 | 6 | Hendrik Duvenhage | South Africa | 55.86 | |
| 31 | 2 | 3 | Vladislav Shuliko | Kyrgyzstan | 56.03 | |
| 32 | 1 | 4 | Ferran Siré | Spain | 56.37 | |
| 33 | 4 | 8 | Dominik Karačić | Croatia | 56.38 | |
| 34 | 2 | 5 | Mohamed Ahmed Mohamed | Egypt | 56.66 | |
| 35 | 3 | 8 | Samy Boutouil | Morocco | 56.95 | |
| 36 | 2 | 2 | Yael Touw Ngie Tjouw | Suriname | 56.96 | |
| 36 | 2 | 8 | Adrián Paseta | Peru | 56.96 | |
| 38 | 1 | 5 | Yacob Al-Khulaifi | Qatar | 57.09 | |
| 39 | 2 | 1 | Low Zheng Yong | Malaysia | 57.21 | |
| 40 | 2 | 7 | Jeerakit Soammanus | Thailand | 58.35 | |
| 41 | 3 | 2 | Joseph Jackson | Australia | 58.38 | |
| 42 | 1 | 6 | Lleyton Martin | Antigua and Barbuda | 59.32 | |
| 43 | 1 | 2 | Ky Odlum | Virgin Islands | 1:00.73 | |
| 44 | 1 | 7 | Emilien Puyo | Monaco | 1:03.69 | |
| 45 | 1 | 1 | Ousmane Touré | Mali | 1:04.02 | |
| | 1 | 3 | Efe Turan | Turkey | DSQ | |
| | 4 | 5 | Tomoe Zenimoto Hvas | Norway | DNS | |

=== Semifinals ===
The semifinals were started on 8 October at 18:32.

| Rank | Heat | Lane | Name | Nationality | Time | Notes |
|---|---|---|---|---|---|---|
| 1 | 2 | 4 | Andrei Minakov | Russia | 51.94 | Q |
| 2 | 2 | 5 | Federico Burdisso | Italy | 52.43 | Q |
| 3 | 1 | 4 | Kristóf Milák | Hungary | 52.56 | Q |
| 4 | 2 | 6 | Shinnosuke Ishikawa | Japan | 52.67 | Q |
| 5 | 2 | 3 | Daniel Cristian Martin | Romania | 52.70 | Q |
| 6 | 1 | 5 | Jakub Majerski | Poland | 52.79 | Q |
| 7 | 2 | 7 | Ihor Troianovskyi | Ukraine | 52.88 | Q |
| 8 | 1 | 6 | Denys Kesil | Ukraine | 53.47 | QSO |
| 8 | 2 | 2 | Noè Ponti | Switzerland | 53.47 | QSO |
| 10 | 1 | 3 | Shen Jiahao | China | 53.52 | |
| 11 | 2 | 1 | Wang Kuan-hung | Chinese Taipei | 53.93 | |
| 12 | 1 | 1 | Sergueï Comte | France | 54.02 | |
| 13 | 1 | 2 | Daniil Markov | Russia | 54.07 | |
| 14 | 1 | 7 | Park Jung-hun | South Korea | 54.21 | |
| 15 | 1 | 8 | Jake Johnson | United States | 54.34 | |
| 16 | 2 | 8 | Ong Jung Yi | Singapore | 54.70 | |

=== Swim-off ===
The swim-off was held on 9 October at 11:29.

| Rank | Lane | Name | Nationality | Time | Notes |
|---|---|---|---|---|---|
| 1 | 5 | Noè Ponti | Switzerland | 53.16 | Q |
| 2 | 4 | Denys Kesil | Ukraine | 53.42 | |

=== Final ===
The final was held on 9 October at 18:46.

| Rank | Lane | Name | Nationality | Time | Notes |
|---|---|---|---|---|---|
| 1st place, gold medalist(s) | 4 | Andrei Minakov | Russia | 51.12 | NR |
| 2nd place, silver medalist(s) | 3 | Kristóf Milák | Hungary | 51.50 | |
| 3rd place, bronze medalist(s) | 5 | Federico Burdisso | Italy | 52.42 | |
| 4 | 6 | Shinnosuke Ishikawa | Japan | 52.52 | |
| 5 | 1 | Ihor Troianovskyi | Ukraine | 52.73 | |
| 6 | 7 | Jakub Majerski | Poland | 52.95 | |
| 7 | 2 | Daniel Cristian Martin | Romania | 53.00 | |
| 8 | 8 | Noè Ponti | Switzerland | 53.56 | |
