= Kristóf Milák =

Hungarian swimmer (born 2000)

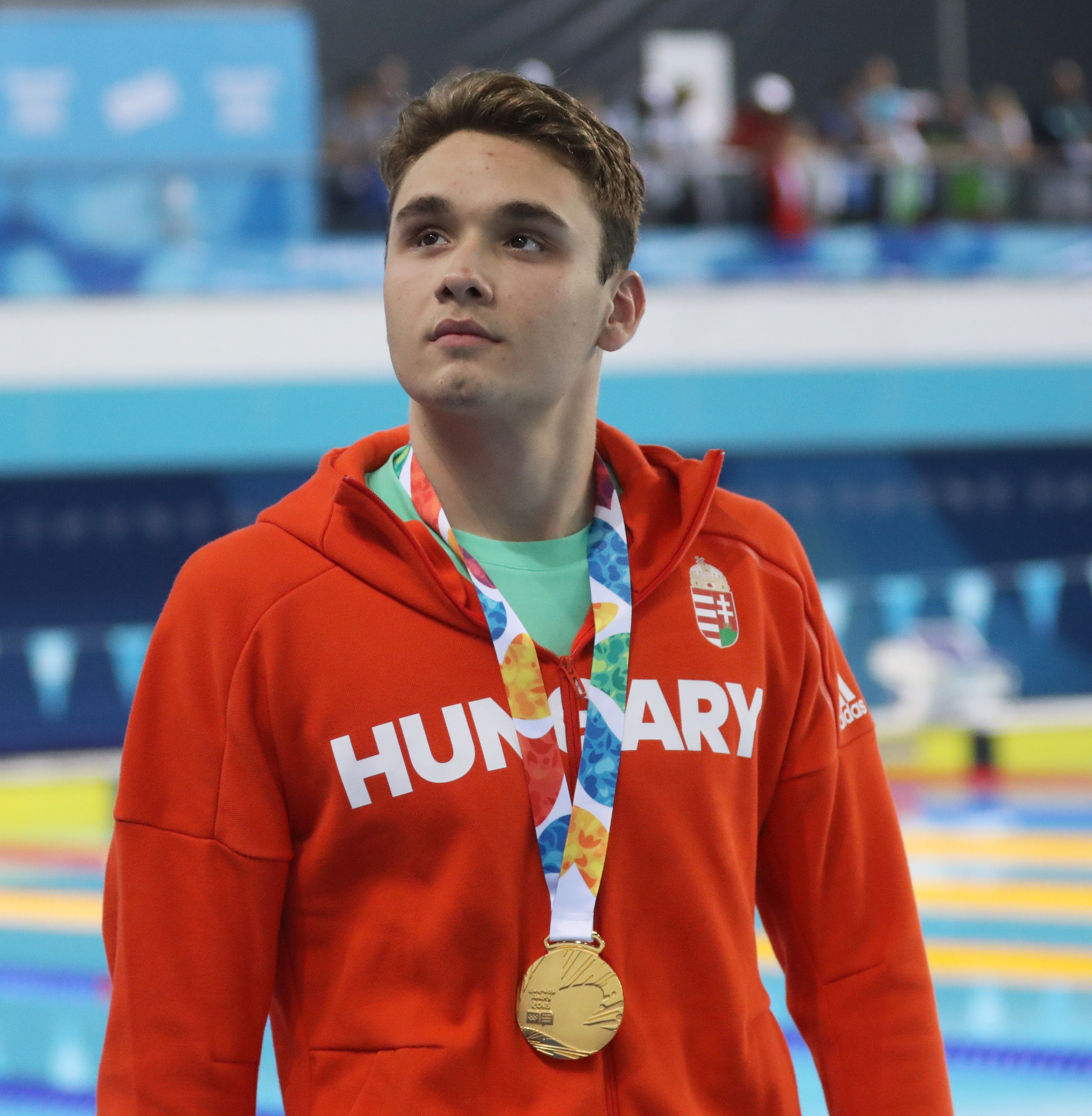
- Milák at the 2018 Summer Youth Olympics

Personal information
- Born: 20 February 2000 (age 26) Budapest, Hungary
- Height: 1.90 m (6 ft 3 in)
- Weight: 83 kg (183 lb)

Sport
- Sport: Swimming
- Strokes: butterfly, freestyle
- Club: Érdi Úszó Sport Kft. ( –2018); Bp. Honvéd (2018– )
- Coach: Szabó Álmos
Medal record
Men's swimming
Representing Hungary
Event	1st	2nd	3rd
Olympic Games	2	2	0
World Championships (LC)	3	1	0
European Championships (LC)	10	2	1
European Championships (SC)	0	1	0
World Junior Championships	4	0	1
Total	19	6	2
Olympic Games Olympic Games
Gold medal – first place	2020 Tokyo	200 m butterfly
Gold medal – first place	2024 Paris	100 m butterfly
Silver medal – second place	2020 Tokyo	100 m butterfly
Silver medal – second place	2024 Paris	200 m butterfly
World Championships (LC)
Gold medal – first place	2019 Gwangju	200 m butterfly
Gold medal – first place	2022 Budapest	100 m butterfly
Gold medal – first place	2022 Budapest	200 m butterfly
Silver medal – second place	2017 Budapest	100 m butterfly
European Championships (LC)
Gold medal – first place	2018 Glasgow	200 m butterfly
Gold medal – first place	2020 Budapest	100 m butterfly
Gold medal – first place	2020 Budapest	200 m butterfly
Gold medal – first place	2022 Rome	100 m butterfly
Gold medal – first place	2022 Rome	200 m butterfly
Gold medal – first place	2022 Rome	4×200 m freestyle
Gold medal – first place	2024 Belgrade	200 m butterfly
Gold medal – first place	2024 Belgrade	100 m butterfly
Gold medal – first place	2026 Paris	100 m butterfly
Gold medal – first place	2026 Paris	4×100 m freestyle
Silver medal – second place	2022 Rome	100 m freestyle
Silver medal – second place	2022 Rome	4×100 m freestyle
Bronze medal – third place	2026 Paris	100 m freestyle
European Championships (SC)
Silver medal – second place	2021 Kazan	200 m butterfly
World Junior Championships
Gold medal – first place	2017 Indianapolis	100 m butterfly
Gold medal – first place	2017 Indianapolis	200 m butterfly
Gold medal – first place	2017 Indianapolis	4×100 m freestyle
Gold medal – first place	2017 Indianapolis	4×200 m freestyle
Bronze medal – third place	2017 Indianapolis	50 m butterfly
European Junior Championships
Gold medal – first place	2016 Hódmezővásárhely	200 m butterfly
Gold medal – first place	2017 Netanya	200 m butterfly
Gold medal – first place	2017 Netanya	4×200 m freestyle
Gold medal – first place	2018 Helsinki	100 m butterfly
Gold medal – first place	2018 Helsinki	200 m butterfly
Gold medal – first place	2018 Helsinki	200 m freestyle
Gold medal – first place	2018 Helsinki	400 m freestyle
Silver medal – second place	2017 Netanya	50 m butterfly
Silver medal – second place	2017 Netanya	100 m butterfly
Silver medal – second place	2017 Netanya	4×100 m freestyle
Bronze medal – third place	2017 Netanya	4×100 m mixed freestyle
Bronze medal – third place	2018 Helsinki	4×100 m mixed freestyle
Youth Olympic Games
Gold medal – first place	2018 Buenos Aires	200 m butterfly
Gold medal – first place	2018 Buenos Aires	200 m freestyle
Gold medal – first place	2018 Buenos Aires	400 m freestyle
Silver medal – second place	2018 Buenos Aires	100 m butterfly

Kristóf Milák (born 20 February 2000) is a Hungarian professional swimmer. He is the current holder of the world record in the long course 200 metre butterfly and the European record in the long course 100 metre butterfly. At his first Olympic Games, the 2020 Summer Olympics, he won a gold medal in the 200 metre butterfly and a silver medal in the 100 metre butterfly. He has also won three gold medals and one silver at the World Aquatic Championships, as well as three gold medals at the European Aquatics Championships. He was the gold medalist in the 400 metre freestyle, 200 metre freestyle, and 200 metre butterfly events at the 2018 Summer Youth Olympics.

== Career ==
=== 2016 ===
When he was 16 years old, Milák competed at the 2016 European Junior Swimming Championships in Hódmezővásárhely, Hungary in July, winning the gold medal in the 200 meter butterfly with a time of 1:56.77, placing fifth in the 100 metre butterfly at 52.98 seconds, and placing seventh with a time of 24.42 seconds in the 50 metre butterfly.

=== 2017: Butterfly lift-off ===
==== 2017 European Junior Championships ====
At the 2017 European Junior Swimming Championships in Netanya, Israel, Milák swam a 1:53.79 in the 200 metre butterfly, winning the gold medal and setting a new world junior record and a new Championships record in the event.

==== 2017 World Championships ====
2017 World Championships
Silver medal – second place	100 m butterfly	50.62 (WJ, NR)

At the 2017 World Aquatics Championships in Budapest, Milák set a new world junior record and a new Hungarian national record of 50.77 seconds in the semifinals of the 100 metre butterfly. Earlier the same day, in the prelims of the same event, he broke his first world junior record of the Championships with a time of 51.23 seconds. In the final he swam a 50.62 and won the silver medal, setting a his third world junior record and second national record in the event. In addition to his national records in the 100 metre butterfly, Milák helped the Hungary 4x100 metre medley relay place seventh in the final and set a new national record of 3:32.13.

==== 2017 World Junior Championships ====
On 26 August 2017, at the 2017 FINA World Junior Swimming Championships in Indianapolis, United States, Milák helped set a new world junior record and Championships record of 7:10.95 in the final of the 4x200 metre freestyle relay.

=== 2018: A year golden in fly and free ===
==== 2018 Spring National and European Junior Championships ====
At the 2018 Hungarian Spring National Championships, Milák, who was just 18 years of age, lowered his own world junior record in the 200 metre butterfly to a 1:52.71. In July, at the 2018 European Junior Swimming Championships, Milák competed in 10 individual and relay events, reaching the semifinal or final in all 10 events, swimming in the final of 9 events, and winning medals in 5 events, of which four were gold medals and one was a bronze medal.

==== 2018 European Championships ====
2018 European Championships
Gold medal – first place	200 m butterfly	1:52.79 (CR)

At the 2018 European Aquatics Championships held in Glasgow, Scotland in August, he won the gold medal in the 200 metre butterfly event with a time of 1:52.79. In the mixed 4x200 metre freestyle relay, he led-off the relay swimming a 1:48.04 for the first leg and helping the relay place fourth with a Hungarian national record time of 7:31.19.

==== 2018 Summer Youth Olympics ====
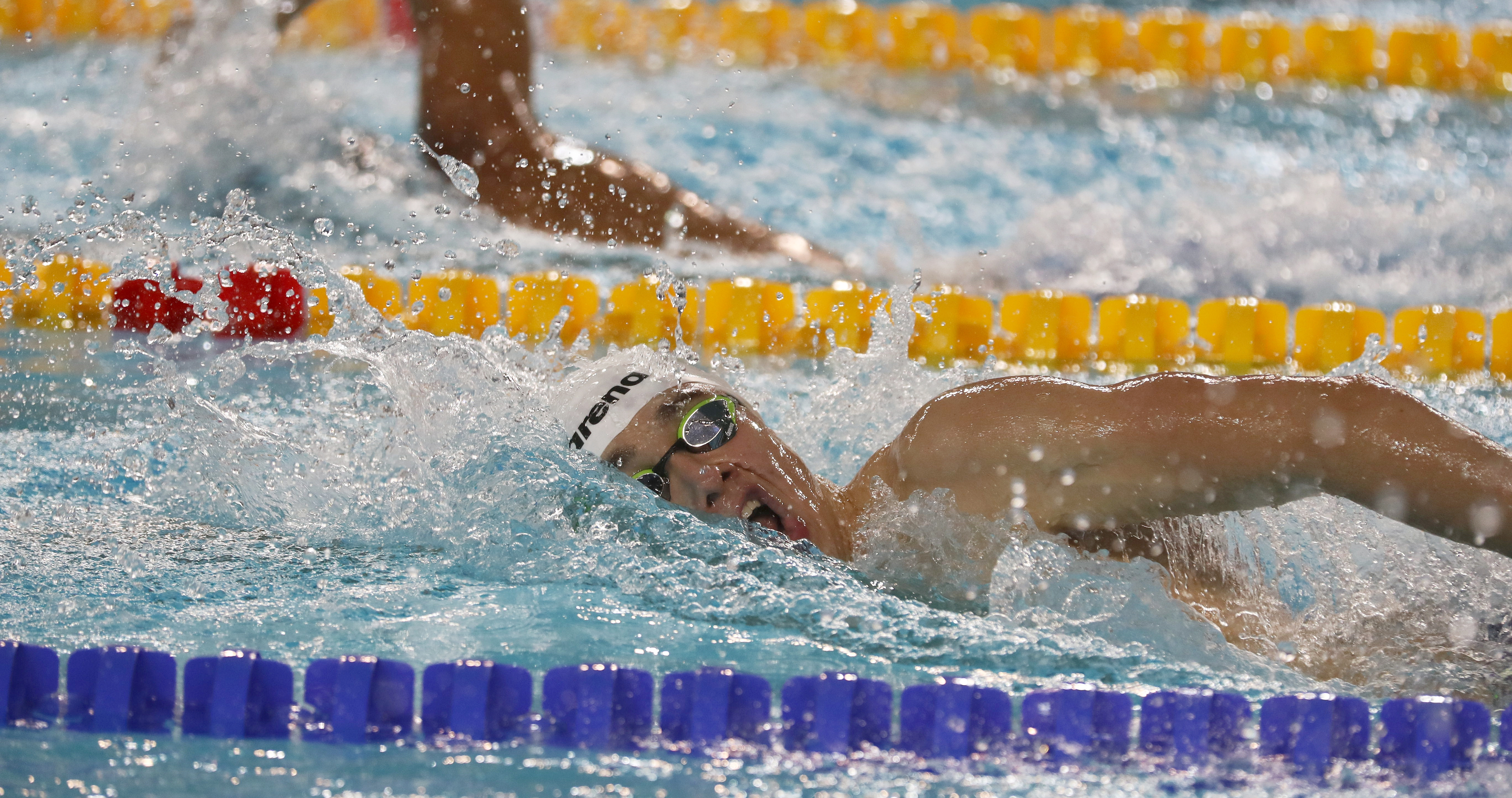
Milák during the 400 metre freestyle final at the 2018 Summer Youth Olympics.

2018 Summer Youth Olympics
Gold medal – first place	400 m freestyle	3:48.08
Gold medal – first place	200 m freestyle	1:47.73
Gold medal – first place	200 m butterfly	1:54.89
Silver medal – second place	100 m butterfly	51.50

Milák won a total of four medals at the 2018 Summer Youth Olympics in Buenos Aires, Argentina in October 2018, three of which were gold medals and one of which was a silver medal. In the 400 metre freestyle Milák won his first gold medal with a time of 3:48.08, finishing almost half a second before silver medalist Marco De Tullio of Italy and splitting under 30 seconds at every 50 meter mark of the race. His second gold medal of the Youth Olympic Games came in the 200 metre freestyle where he was the only swimmer under 1:48.00, winning in a time of 1:47.73. He won his third gold medal in a butterfly event, the 200 metre butterfly, where he finished exactly 1.00 seconds ahead of second-place finisher Denys Kesil of Ukraine with a time of 1:54.89. In the 100 metre butterfly, Milák won his only silver medal of the meet, ranking second in the final behind Andrei Minakov of Russia with a time of 51.50 seconds.

==== 2018 Winter National Championships ====
Once back to Hungary from the Summer Youth Olympics, Milák set a new national record in the short course 50 metre backstroke with a time of 23.49 seconds on 10 November 2018 at the 2018 Hungarian Winter National Championships conducted in short course metres.

=== 2019: Toppling a decade-old world record ===
==== 2019 World Championships ====
2019 World Championships
Gold medal – first place	200 m butterfly	1:50.73 (WR)

FINA official video: Milák breaks 10-year-old 200m fly world record

At the 2019 World Aquatics Championships held in Gwangju, South Korea in July 2019, Milák won the gold medal and set a new world record of 1:50.73 in the 200 metre butterfly on 24 July, breaking Michael Phelps' 10-year-old world record by 0.78 seconds. In addition to breaking the world record set by Phelps in 2009, Milák became the first person to hold the world record in the men's long course 200 metre butterfly event other than Phelps in an 18-year period. It was also the first time in almost a decade that any swimmer had a long course world record in a butterfly event at either the 100 metre or 200 metre distance other than Phelps, with the last swimmer being Milorad Čavić of Serbia in the 100 metre butterfly in 2009.

==== International Swimming League ====
In 2019, Milák was member of the 2019 International Swimming League representing Team Iron. He won the 200m butterfly in both matches he participated in. (Lewisville, Budapest)

=== 2020: COVID-19 sidelines Milák ===
==== International Swimming League ====
Due to a positive test of having COVID-19, Milák was unable to participate in the 2020 International Swimming League at full capacity, he was on the roster of Team Iron though was out of the season.

=== 2021: Milák springs back ===
==== 2021 Spring National Championships ====
At the long course 2021 Hungarian Spring National Championships in Budapest, Milák set his first national record of the Championships in the 100 metre freestyle by dropping over eight tenths of a second off his best time to set the new record at 48.00 seconds, which was eight hundredths of a second faster than the previous record. Milák also broke the 100 metre butterfly national record he set in 2017 at 50.62 seconds with a new personal best time of 50.47 seconds. He also anchored the 4x200 metre freestyle relay with a split of 1:44.86, helping the relay set a new national record of 7:07.67 in the event.

==== 2020 European Championships ====
2020 European Championships
Gold medal – first place	200 m butterfly	1:51.10 (CR)
Gold medal – first place	100 m butterfly	50.18 (CR, NR)

At the 2020 European Aquatics Championships in Budapest, Milák won his first gold medal in Championships record time in the 200 metre butterfly, which was the second gold medal for Hungary and first gold medal for a male Hungarian in any sport at the Championships. He also won the gold medal in the 100 metre butterfly with a national record and Championships record time of 50.18 seconds in the final after achieving Championships records in both the prelims and semifinals of the event.

==== 2020 Summer Olympics ====
2020 Summer Olympics
Gold medal – first place	200 m butterfly	1:51.25 (OR)
Silver medal – second place	100 m butterfly	49.68 (ER)

At the 2020 Summer Olympics in Tokyo, Japan and postponed to 2021 due to the COVID-19 pandemic, Milák won the gold medal in the 200 metre butterfly in a new Olympic record time of 1:51.25. He finished over one body length ahead of and more than two seconds before the second-place finisher and silver medalist, Japan's Tomoru Honda. In the semifinals of the 100 metre butterfly, Milák broke the Olympic record of 50.39 set by Caeleb Dressel of the United States in the prelims heats and set a new Olympic record of 50.31 seconds. He won the silver medal with a time of 49.68 in the final, less than three tenths of a second slower than the first-place finisher. His time of 49.68 seconds in the final set a new European record and Hungarian record in the event and moved him up in global rankings to second fastest swimmer in the event internationally, ahead of Michael Phelps and behind Caeleb Dressel. In addition to his butterfly individual events, Milák swam in the prelims and finals of the 4x100 meter freestyle relay, helping the relay finish fifth and set a new Hungarian record in the final.

==== International Swimming League ====
Milák was selected as one of the swimmers for Team Iron in the 2021 International Swimming League, which was the third season of the International Swimming League.

==== 2021 Swimming World Cup: Budapest ====
2021 World Cup — Budapest
Gold medal – first place	50 m backstroke	23.08 (NR)
Silver medal – second place	100 m butterfly	49.92
Silver medal – second place	4x50 m mixed freestyle	1:32.44
Bronze medal – third place	100 m freestyle	46.93
Bronze medal – third place	200 m freestyle	1:42.61

On the first day of the 2021 FINA Swimming World Cup stop in Budapest and held in short course metres, 7 October, Milák advanced to the final of the 100 metre butterfly with a time of 50.60 seconds. He also advanced to the final of the 50 metre freestyle, with a new personal best time of 21.62 seconds. Later in the day during the finals session, Milák swam a personal best time in the 100 metre butterfly at 49.92 seconds and won the silver medal in the event behind Tom Shields of the United States. In the final of the 50 metre freestyle, Milák lowered his time from the prelims by almost two tenths of a second to 21.44 seconds and ranked fifth overall.

Starting off day two of competition in the morning, Milák swam a personal best time of 23.34 in the 50 metre backstroke, breaking the Hungarian national record of 23.39 in the event, and advancing to the final ranked first overall. To conclude his morning prelims session, Milák qualified for the final of the 100 metre freestyle ranked sixth overall with his time of 47.48 seconds. He dropped over two tenths of a second in the final of the 50 metre backstroke in the evening, winning the gold medal and setting a new national record of 23.08 seconds. Transitioning to freestyle for his last two events of the day, he broke 47 seconds for the first time in the 100 metre freestyle final and won the bronze medal with a time of 46.93 seconds, finishing within two seconds of gold medalist Kyle Chalmers of Australia and silver medalist Vladimir Morozov of Russia. In his third and final event of the day two finals session, the mixed 4x50 metre freestyle relay, Milák split a 20.94, helping his relay win the silver medal in a time of 1:32.44.

The final morning of competition in Budapest, Milák advanced to the final in both of the events he raced. Up first, in the 50 metre butterfly, he qualified ranked third for the final with his prelims time of 22.91 seconds. About an hour later, in the prelims of the 200 metre freestyle, he swam within a second of his best time at 1:45.62 and advanced to the final ranked sixth. Milák just missed the podium in the final of the 50 metre butterfly, finishing fourth with a personal best time of 22.64 seconds. In the final of the 200 metre freestyle, he swam another personal best time, dropping over two full seconds from his previous best time of 1:44.91 to win the bronze medal with a time of 1:42.61. In terms of total points scored for his swims at the Budapest stop, Milák ranked fifth amongst male competitors, in terms of total points earned across all four World Cup stops, for which Milák only competed at the one Budapest stop, Milák's scores from the one stop were good enough to rank him as 35th overall highest scoring male competitor, and amongst male competitors who competed at only one stop in the World Cup circuit Milák ranked as number five in terms of total points.

==== 2021 European Short Course Championships ====
2021 European Championships (SC)
Silver medal – second place	200 m butterfly	1:51.11

To follow-up his short course performances at the World Cup, Milák entered to compete at the 2021 European Short Course Swimming Championships held at the Kazan Aquatics Palace in Russia starting on 2 November. He diversified his line-up with five events spanning three different strokes, entering to race in the 50 metre backstroke, 100 metre butterfly, 200 meter butterfly, 100 metre freestyle, and 200 metre freestyle.

On 2 November, day one of competition, Milák qualified for the semifinals of the 50 metre backstroke with his time of 23.91 seconds, which was a little over four tenths of a second behind Simone Sabbioni of Italy who competed in the same prelims heat and did not qualify for the semifinals as he was not one of the fastest two swimmers in the prelims heats from his country. Later in the same prelims session, Milák advanced to the semifinals later the same day in his second event, the 100 metre butterfly, with a time of 50.39 seconds. For the semifinals of the 50 metre backstroke, he swam a 23.50, qualifying for the final ranked eighth. His last race of day one, the semifinals of the 100 metre butterfly, Milák swam a personal best time of 49.71 seconds and advanced to the final ranking second. The following day, Milák placed eighth in the final of the 50 metre backstroke with a time of 23.34 seconds. In the final of the 100 metre butterfly, he just missed the podium, finishing in fourth place with a time of 49.88 seconds.

In the prelims of the 200 metre butterfly on the morning of day three, Milák qualified for the semifinals with a time of 1:54.32. He swam a 1:51.33 in the semifinals and qualified for the final the following day ranked first. The next day, Milák decided not to swim in the prelims heats of the 200 metre freestyle, resting for the final of the 200 metre butterfly in the evening. Later in the day, during the evening finals session, he won his first medal at a European Short Course Swimming Championships, earning the gold medal in the 200 metre butterfly with a time of 1:51.11 in the final of the event. On the fifth day, Milák swam a near-best time of 47.16 seconds in the 100 metre freestyle prelims heats and advanced to the semifinals ranking tenth amongst the swimmers who qualified for the semifinals and fourteenth overall. He followed up his morning time with a 47.08 in the evening semifinals, placing ninth and earning the designation of alternate for the final.

=== 2022 ===
==== 2022 World Championships ====
2022 World Championships
Gold medal – first place	200 m butterfly	1:50.34 (WR)
Gold medal – first place	100 m butterfly	50.14

At the 2022 World Aquatics Championships in Budapest in June and July, Milák split the second-fastest time of all finals relays swimmers in the 4×100 metre freestyle relay with a time of 46.89 seconds to help place fifth in 3:11.24. Three days later, in the final of the 200 metre butterfly, he lowered his own world record in the event to a 1:50.34 and won the gold medal, finishing 3.03 seconds ahead of the silver medalist Léon Marchand of France. Swimming the anchor leg of the 4×200 metre freestyle relay in the final two days later, he split a 1:44.68 to help achieve a time of 7:06.27 and fifth-place finish. The following day, he won a gold medal in the 100 metre butterfly with a time of 50.14 seconds, finishing eight-tenths of a second ahead of silver medalist Naoki Mizunuma of Japan.

==== 2022 European Aquatics Championships ====
2022 European Championships (LC)
Gold medal – first place	4×200 m freestyle	7:05.38 (NR)
Gold medal – first place	100 m butterfly	50.33
Gold medal – first place	200 m butterfly	1:52.01
Silver medal – second place	100 m freestyle	47.47 (NR)
Silver medal – second place	4×100 m freestyle	3:12.43

For the 2022 European Aquatics Championships, held in August in Rome, Italy, Milák entered to compete in the 100 metre freestyle, 200 metre freestyle, 100 metre butterfly, and 200 metre butterfly individual events. On the first day of competition, he won a gold medal in the 4×200 metre freestyle relay, splitting a 1:44.42 for the anchor leg of the relay to contribute to the final mark, and new Hungarian record, of 7:05.38. The next day he qualified for the semifinals of the 100 metre freestyle, ranking twelfth in the preliminaries with a time of 48.88 seconds. In the semifinals, he swam a personal best time of 47.76 seconds, qualifying for the final ranking second by two-tenths of a second ahead of third-ranked Alessandro Miressi of Italy. Day three, he started off with a 51.82 in the preliminaries of the 100 metre butterfly, qualifying for the semifinals ranking third. Starting off the evening session, he won the silver medal in the 100 metre freestyle with a Hungarian record time of 47.47 seconds. Finishing off the session, he swam a 51.01 in the semifinals of the 100 metre butterfly, qualifying for the final ranking first.

Day four, Milák ranked first in the morning prelims heats of the 200 metre freestyle, qualifying for the semifinals with a time of 1:46.26. Later in the morning session, he anchored the 4×100 metre freestyle relay with a 48.84 to help qualify the relay to the final ranking first. Starting off the evening session, he won the gold medal in the 100 metre butterfly with a time of 50.33 seconds. Approximately 15 minutes later, he placed tenth in the semifinals of the 200 metre freestyle with a time of 1:47.37. About an hour after that, he won a silver medal in the 4×100 metre freestyle relay, splitting a 47.24 for the anchor leg of the relay to help finish in 3:12.43. In the preliminaries of the 200 metre butterfly the next morning, he swam a 1:54.97 and qualified for the semifinals ranking first. He sped up to a 1:53.97 in the semifinals to qualify for the final ranking first. He won his third gold medal of the Championships the following day, finishing first in the 200 metre butterfly with a time of 1:52.01, which was 2.77 seconds ahead of silver medalist and fellow Hungarian Richárd Márton.

Later in the year, at the 2022 Hungarian National Short Course Swimming Championships in November, Milák achieved a suite of personal best times including a 1:49.86 in the 200 metre butterfly and a 49.56 in the 100 metre butterfly.

=== 2023 ===
At the 2023 Hungarian National Championships in April, Milák won the national title in the 200 metre butterfly on day two with a 2023 World Aquatics Championships and 2024 Olympic qualifying time of 1:52.58. On the fourth and final day, he achieved the duo of qualifying times in the 100 metre butterfly, winning the national title with a time of 50.80 seconds. He also won nationals titles with 2023 World Championships qualifying times in the 100 metre freestyle, with a 48.40 on day one, and the 200 metre freestyle, with a 1:46.68 on day three.

== International championships (50 m) ==
Meet	50 free	100 free	200 free	400 free	100 back	50 fly	100 fly	200 fly	4×100 free	4×200 free	4×100 medley	4×100 mixed free	4×200 mixed free	4×100 mixed medley
Junior level
EJC 2016						7th	5th	1st place, gold medalist(s)					—N/a	
EJC 2017						2nd place, silver medalist(s)	2nd place, silver medalist(s)	1st place, gold medalist(s)	2nd place, silver medalist(s)	1st place, gold medalist(s)		1st place, gold medalist(s)	—N/a	
WJC 2017						3rd place, bronze medalist(s)	1st place, gold medalist(s)	1st place, gold medalist(s)	1st place, gold medalist(s)	1st place, gold medalist(s)		DSQ	—N/a	
EJC 2018		9th	1st place, gold medalist(s)	1st place, gold medalist(s)	4th	6th	1st place, gold medalist(s)	1st place, gold medalist(s)			6th	3rd place, bronze medalist(s)	—N/a	5th
YOG 2018		7th (sf)	1st place, gold medalist(s)	1st place, gold medalist(s)		7th	2nd place, silver medalist(s)	1st place, gold medalist(s)		—N/a	4th		—N/a	
Senior level
WC 2017							2nd place, silver medalist(s)				7th		—N/a	
EC 2018						37th	4th	1st place, gold medalist(s)			5th		4th	
WC 2019							4th	1st place, gold medalist(s)	7th				—N/a	
EC 2020	DNS	13th (h)	5th	20th		21st	1st place, gold medalist(s)	1st place, gold medalist(s)	4th					
OG 2020						—N/a	2nd place, silver medalist(s)	1st place, gold medalist(s)	5th			—N/a	—N/a	
WC 2022							1st place, gold medalist(s)	1st place, gold medalist(s)	5th	5th			—N/a	
EC 2022		2nd place, silver medalist(s)	10th				1st place, gold medalist(s)	1st place, gold medalist(s)	2nd place, silver medalist(s)	1st place, gold medalist(s)				
OG 2024						—N/a	1st place, gold medalist(s)	2nd place, silver medalist(s)				—N/a	—N/a	

== International championships (25 m) ==
Meet	100 free	200 free	50 back	100 fly	200 fly
EC 2021	9th	DNS	8th	4th	2nd place, silver medalist(s)

== Personal best times ==
=== Long course metres (50 m pool) ===
Event	Time		Meet	Date	Age	Location	Notes	Ref
50 m freestyle	21.46		2026 European Aquatics Championships	16 August 2026	26	Paris		
100 m freestyle	46.87		2026 European Aquatics Championships	12 August 2026	26	Paris	NR	
200 m freestyle	1:45.74		2020 European Aquatics Championships	21 May 2021	21	Budapest		
400 m freestyle	3:48.08		2018 Summer Youth Olympics	7 October 2018	18	Buenos Aires, Argentina		
50 m backstroke	25.23		Hungarian National Championships	31 March 2018	18	Debrecen		
100 m backstroke	54.67		2018 European Junior Championships	4 July 2018	18	Helsinki, Finland		
200 m backstroke	1:59.75		Hungarian Junior Championship	1 June 2018	18	Hódmezővásárhely		
50 m butterfly	22.75	sf	2026 European Aquatics Championships	10 August 2026	26	Paris, France	NR	
100 m butterfly	49.48		2026 European Aquatics Championships	13 August 2026	26	Paris, France	ER, NR	
200 m butterfly	1:50.34		2022 World Aquatics Championships	21 June 2022	22	Budapest, Hungary	WR	

Legend: WR – World record; ER – European record; NR – Hungarian record; e – equalled existing record;
Records not set in finals: h – heat; sf – semifinal; r – relay 1st leg; rh – relay heat 1st leg; b – B final; † – en route to final mark; so – swim-off; tt – time trial

=== Short course metres (25 m pool) ===
Event	Time	Meet	Date	Age	Location	Notes	Ref
50 m freestyle	21.03	2022 Hungarian National Short Course Championships	17 November 2022	22	Kaposvár		
100 m freestyle	46.72	2022 Hungarian National Short Course Championships	16 November 2022	22	Kaposvár		
200 m freestyle	1:42.61	2021 FINA Swimming World Cup	9 October 2021	21	Budapest		
50 m backstroke	23.08	2021 FINA Swimming World Cup	8 October 2021	21	Budapest	Former NR	
50 m butterfly	22.42	2022 Hungarian National Short Course Championships	18 November 2022	22	Kaposvár		
100 m butterfly	49.56	2022 Hungarian National Short Course Championships	19 November 2022	22	Kaposvár		
200 m butterfly	1:49.86	2022 Hungarian National Short Course Championships	17 November 2022	22	Kaposvár		

Legend: NR – Hungarian record; e – equalled existing record;
Records not set in finals: h – heat; sf – semifinal; r – relay 1st leg; rh – relay heat 1st leg; b – B final; † – en route to final mark; so – swim-off; tt – time trial

== Swimming World Cup circuits ==
The following medals Milák has won at Swimming World Cup circuits.

Edition	Gold medals	Silver medals	Bronze medals	Total
2019	3	3	1	7
2021	1	2	2	5
Total	4	5	3	12

== World records ==
=== World records ===
==== Long course metres (50 m pool) ====
No.	Event	Time	Meet	Location	Date	Age	Status	Ref
1	200 m butterfly	1:50.73	2019 World Aquatics Championships	Gwangju, South Korea	24 July 2019	19	Former	
2	200 m butterfly	1:50.34	2022 World Aquatics Championships	Budapest, Hungary	21 June 2022	22	Current	

=== World junior records ===
==== Long course metres (50 m pool) ====
No.	Event	Time		Meet	Location	Date	Age	Status	Notes	Ref
1	200 m butterfly	1:53.79		2017 European Junior Swimming Championships	Netanya, Israel	30 June 2017	17	Former		
2	100 m butterfly	51.23	h	2017 World Aquatics Championships	Budapest, Hungary	28 July 2017	17	Former		
3	100 m butterfly (2)	50.77	sf	2017 World Aquatics Championships	Budapest, Hungary	28 July 2017	17	Former	Former NR	
4	100 m butterfly (3)	50.62		2017 World Aquatics Championships	Budapest, Hungary	29 July 2017	17	Current	Former NR	
5	4x200 m freestyle relay	7:10.95		2017 World Junior Championships	Indianapolis, United States	26 August 2017	17	Former		
6	200 m butterfly (2)	1:52.71		2018 Hungarian Spring National Championships	Debrecen, Hungary	28 March 2018	18	Current		

Legend: NR – Hungarian record; e – equalled existing record;
Records not set in finals: h – heat; sf – semifinal; r – relay 1st leg; rh – relay heat 1st leg; b – B final; † – en route to final mark; so – swim-off; tt – time trial

== Continental and national records ==
=== Long course metres (50 m pool) ===
No.	Event	Time		Meet	Location	Date	Age	Type	Status	Notes	Ref
1	100 m butterfly	50.77	sf	2017 World Aquatics Championships	Budapest, Hungary	28 July 2017	17	NR	Former	Former WJ	
2	100 m butterfly (2)	50.62		2017 World Aquatics Championships	Budapest, Hungary	29 July 2017	17	NR	Former	WJ	
3	4×100 m medley	3:32.13		2017 World Aquatics Championships	Budapest, Hungary	30 July 2017	17	NR	Current		
4	4×200 m mixed freestyle	7:31.19		2018 European Aquatics Championships	Glasgow, Scotland	4 August 2018	18	NR	Current		
5	200 m butterfly	1:50.73		2019 World Aquatics Championships	Gwangju, South Korea	24 July 2019	19	ER, NR	Former	Former WR	
6	4×200 m freestyle	7:07.67		2021 Hungarian National Championships	Budapest, Hungary	24 March 2021	21	NR	Former		
7	100 m freestyle	48.00		2021 Hungarian National Championships	Budapest, Hungary	26 March 2021	21	NR	Former		
8	100 m butterfly (3)	50.47		2021 Hungarian National Championships	Budapest, Hungary	27 March 2021	21	NR	Former		
9	100 m butterfly (4)	50.18		2020 European Aquatics Championships	Budapest, Hungary	23 May 2021	21	NR	Former		
10	4×100 m freestyle	3:11.06		2020 Summer Olympics	Tokyo, Japan	26 July 2021	21	NR	Current		
11	100 m butterfly (5)	49.68		2020 Summer Olympics	Tokyo, Japan	31 July 2021	21	ER, NR	Current		
12	200 m butterfly (2)	1:50.34		2022 World Aquatics Championships	Budapest, Hungary	21 June 2022	22	ER, NR	Current	WR	
13	4×200 m freestyle (2)	7:05.38		2022 European Aquatics Championships	Rome, Italy	11 August 2022	22	NR	Current		
14	100 m freestyle (2)	47.47		2022 European Aquatics Championships	Rome, Italy	13 August 2022	22	NR	Current		

Legend: WR – World record; ER – European record; NR – Hungarian record; e – equalled existing record; WJ – World Junior record;
Records not set in finals: h – heat; sf – semifinal; r – relay 1st leg; rh – relay heat 1st leg; b – B final; † – en route to final mark; so – swim-off; tt – time trial

=== Short course metres (25 m pool) ===
No.	Event	Time		Meet	Location	Date	Age	Type	Status	Ref
1	50 m backstroke	23.49		2018 Hungarian Winter National Championships	Százhalombatta, Hungary	10 November 2018	18	NR	Former	
2	50 m backstroke (2)	23.34	h	2021 FINA Swimming World Cup	Budapest, Hungary	8 October 2021	21	NR	Former	
3	50 m backstroke (3)	23.08		2021 FINA Swimming World Cup	Budapest, Hungary	8 October 2021	21	NR	Current	

Legend: NR – Hungarian record; e – equalled existing record;
Records not set in finals: h – heat; sf – semifinal; r – relay 1st leg; rh – relay heat 1st leg; b – B final; † – en route to final mark; so – swim-off; tt – time trial

== Awards ==
- SwimSwam, Top 100 (Men's): 2021 (#9), 2022 (#5)
- Swimming World, Newcomer of the Year: 2017

== See also ==
- List of Youth Olympic Games gold medalists who won Olympic gold medals
- List of junior world records in swimming
- List of European records in swimming
- List of world records in swimming
- World record progression 200 metres butterfly

Records
Preceded by (United States) Michael Phelps	Men's 200-meter butterfly world record holder (long course); July 24, 2019 –	Succeeded by Incumbent
Awards
Preceded by Shaolin Sándor Liu	Hungarian Sportsman of The Year; 2019	Succeeded by Dominik Szoboszlai
