= 2016 European Junior Swimming Championships =

Water sport competitions

The 2016 European Junior Swimming Championships were held from 6–10 July 2016 in Hódmezővásárhely, Hungary. The Championships were organized by LEN, the European Swimming League, and were held in a 50-meter pool. The Championships were for girls aged 14–17 and boys age 15–18.

== Results ==
=== Boys ===
| Games | Gold | | Silver | | Bronze | |
|---|---|---|---|---|---|---|
| 50 m freestyle | Giovanni Izzo; Italy | 22.09 | Bruno Blašković; Croatia | 22.25 | Thomas Fannon; Great Britain | 22.30 |
| 100 m freestyle | Alessandro Miressi; Italy | 49.40 | Sergii Shevtsov; Ukraine | 49.57 | Noah Paut Karlo; Croatia | 49.64 |
| 200 m freestyle | Kacper Stokowski; Poland | 1:48.51 | Alexei Sancov; Moldova | 1:48.54 | Richárd Márton; Hungary Mateusz Arndt; Poland | 1:49.37 |
| 400 m freestyle | Moritz Brandt; Germany | 3:48.57 | Victor Johansson; Sweden | 3:50.21 | Richárd Márton; Hungary | 3:52.01 |
| 800 m freestyle | Victor Johansson; Sweden | 7:56.64 | Tom Derbyshire; Great Britain | 7:59.78 | Thore Bermel; Germany | 8:00.45 |
| 1500 m freestyle | Tom Derbyshire; Great Britain | 15:08.31 | Albert Escrits; Spain | 15:11.60 | Victor Johansson; Sweden | 15:15.24 |
| 50 m backstroke | Kliment Kolesnikov; Russia | 24.94 CR, WJR | Hugo González; Spain | 25.31 | Nikolaos Sofianidis; Greece | 25.44 |
| 100 m backstroke | Kliment Kolesnikov; Russia | 53.65 CR, WJR | Conor Ferguson; Ireland | 54.49 | Nikolaos Sofianidis; Greece | 54.57 |
| 200 m backstroke | Hugo González; Spain | 1:57.00 | Jakub Skierka; Poland | 1:57.97 | Jacopo Bietti; Italy | 1:57.99 |
| 50 m breaststroke | Nikola Obrovac; Croatia | 27.66 | Nicolò Martinenghi; Italy | 27.73 | Federico Poggio; Italy | 27.86 |
| 100 m breaststroke | Nicolò Martinenghi; Italy | 1:00.30 CR | Federico Poggio; Italy | 1:01.13 | David Murphy; Great Britain | 1:02.03 |
| 200 m breaststroke | Kirill Mordashev; Russia | 2:11.18 | Nicolò Martinenghi; Italy | 2:12.95 | Christopher Rothbauer; Austria | 2:13.07 |
| 50 m butterfly | Andrii Khloptsov; Ukraine | 23.51 CR | Alberto Lozano; Spain | 23.53 | Kregor Zirk; Estonia | 24.02 |
| 100 m butterfly | Egor Kuimov; Russia | 52.39 | Roman Shevliakov; Russia | 52.70 | Alberto Lozano; Spain | 52.75 |
| 200 m butterfly | Kristóf Milák; Hungary | 1:56.77 | Antani Ivanov; Bulgaria | 1:57.11 | Damian Chrzanowski; Poland | 1:57.49 |
| 200 m individual medley | Joe Litchfield; Great Britain | 2:01.07 | Márton Barta; Hungary | 2:01.13 | Lorenzo Glessi; Italy | 2:01.30 |
| 400 m individual medley | Hugo González; Spain | 4:17.27 | Márton Barta; Hungary | 4:18.51 | Zoltán Drigán; Hungary | 4:20.84 |
| 4×100 m freestyle | Russia; Ivan Girev (50.55); Mikhail Vekovishchev (49.19); Evgenii Galchenko (49.83); Semen Shakhanov (49.72) | 3:19.29 | Italy; Alessandro Miressi (49.61); Lorenzo Glessi (50.68); Stefano di Cola (50.17); Giovanni Izzo (48.98) | 3:19.42 | Poland; Karol Ostrowski (50.79); Jakub Kraska (49.68); Bartosz Piszczorowicz (50.48); Kacper Stokowski (50.15) | 3:21.10 |
| 4×200 m freestyle | Poland; Kacper Stokowski (1:48.76); Mateusz Arndt (1:50.20); Mateusz Kasztelan (1:49.33); Antoni Kaluzynski (1:49.72) | 7:18.01 | Russia; Aleksei Rtishchev (1:50.46); Mikhail Vekovishchev (1:48.23); Emil Mukhametzianov (1:50.35); Petr Zhikharev (1:50.43) | 7:19.47 | Israel; Tomer Frankel (1:51.09); Itay Karmi (1:50.88); Denis Loktev (1:49.66); Alon Shami (1:51.40) | 7:23.03 |
| 4×100 m medley | Italy; Jacopo Bietti (55.61); Nicolò Martinenghi (59.76); Lorenzo Glessi (52.89); Alessandro Miressi (48.80) | 3:37.06 | Russia; Kliment Kolesnikov (54.21); Vitaly Sukhoruchenko (1:02.18); Roman Shevliakov (52.41); Mikhail Vekovishchev (49.31) | 3:38.11 | Poland; Jakub Skierka (55.42); Robert Kusto (1:01.20); Damian Chrzanowski (53.59); Jakub Kraska (49.72) | 3:39.93 |

=== Girls ===
| Games | Gold | | Silver | | Bronze | |
|---|---|---|---|---|---|---|
| 50 m freestyle | Mariia Kameneva; Russia | 25.02 CR | Julie Kepp Jensen; Denmark | 25.37 | Nea-Amanda Heinola; Finland | 25.64 |
| 100 m freestyle | Freya Anderson; Great Britain | 54.72 | Barbora Seemanová; Czech Republic | 54.97 | Mariia Kameneva; Russia | 55.43 |
| 200 m freestyle | Ajna Késely; Hungary | 1:57.96 CR | Barbora Seemanová; Czech Republic | 1:58.14 | Janja Šegel; Slovenia | 1:58.38 |
| 400 m freestyle | Ajna Késely; Hungary | 4:08.10 CR | Holly Hibbott; Great Britain | 4:08.40 | Anastasiia Kirpichnikova; Russia | 4:11.61 |
| 800 m freestyle | Ajna Késely; Hungary | 8:34.37 | Tamila Holub; Portugal | 8:36.57 | Lea Boy; Germany | 8:36.86 |
| 1500 m freestyle | Tamila Holub; Portugal | 16:20.80 CR | Celine Rieder; Germany | 16:25.03 | Sveva Schiazzano; Italy | 16:26.16 |
| 50 m backstroke | Polina Egorova; Russia | 28.43 | Tania Quaglieri; Italy | 28.46 | Mariia Kameneva; Russia | 28.53 |
| 100 m backstroke | Tania Quaglieri; Italy | 1:01.38 | Maryna Kolesnykova; Ukraine | 1:01.67 | Anna Maine; Great Britain | 1:02.04 |
| 200 m backstroke | Tazmin Pugh; Great Britain | 2:11.12 | Tatiana Salcutan; Moldova | 2:11.69 | Polina Egorova; Russia | 2:11.79 |
| 50 m breaststroke | Tina Čelik; Slovenia | 31.85 | Tara Vovk; Slovenia | 31.93 | Mona McSharry; Ireland | 31.98 |
| 100 m breaststroke | Giulia Verona; Italy | 1:08.32 | Mona McSharry; Ireland | 1:08.88 | Tina Čelik; Slovenia | 1:09.74 |
| 200 m breaststroke | Giulia Verona; Italy | 2:26.53 | Layla Black; Great Britain | 2:29.11 | Emma Cain; Great Britain | 2:29.94 |
| 50 m butterfly | Mariia Kameneva; Russia | 26.22 CR | Sara Junevik; Sweden | 26.98 | Polina Egorova; Russia | 27.01 |
| 100 m butterfly | Polina Egorova; Russia | 59.00 | Petra Barocsai; Hungary | 59.87 | Laura Stephens; Great Britain | 59.94 |
| 200 m butterfly | Emily Large; Great Britain | 2:08.87 | Julia Mrozinski; Germany | 2:10.16 | Laura Stephens; Great Britain | 2:10.18 |
| 200 m individual medley | Ilaria Cusinato; Italy | 2:13.03 CR | Sara Franceschi; Italy | 2:13.98 | Anja Crevar; Serbia | 2:14.41 |
| 400 m individual medley | Anja Crevar; Serbia | 4:41.54 | Anna Pirovano; Italy | 4:42.06 | Abbie Wood; Great Britain | 4:42.13 |
| 4×100 m freestyle | Denmark; Emily Gantriis (57.05); Signe Bro (55.85); Amalie Søby Mortensen (55.72); Julie Kepp Jensen (54.80) | 3:43.42 | Russia; Mariia Kameneva (55.33); Vasilissa Buinaia (55.51); Olesia Cherniatina (56.37); Katarina Milutinovich (57.14) | 3:44.35 | Great Britain; Freya Anderson (55.59); Anna Maine (56.85); Emily Large (56.89); Holly Hibbott (55.92) | 3:45.25 |
| 4×200 m freestyle | Hungary; Fanni Gyurinovics (2:01.94); Janka Juhász (2:01.97); Petra Barocsai (2:00.56); Ajna Késely (1:58.20) | 8:02.67 | Great Britain; Freya Anderson (2:00.90); Hannah Featherstone (2:01.04); Tazmin Pugh (2:01.86); Holly Hibbott (1:59.65) | 8:03.45 | Russia; Anastasiia Kirpichnikova (2:00.46); Oksana Logvinova (2:00.40); Olesia Cherniatina (2:02.51); Irina Krivonogova (2:00.28) | 8:03.65 |
| 4×100 m medley | Russia; Mariia Kameneva (1:01.68); Margarita Driamina (1:10.20); Polina Egorova (58.86); Vasilissa Buinaia (55.11) | 4:05.85 | Italy; Tania Quaglieri (1:01.81); Giulia Verona (1:08.78); Ilaria Cusinato (1:00.30); Sara Ongaro (56.05) | 4:06.94 | Great Britain; Anna Maine (1:03.01); Layla Black (1:09.76); Laura Stephens (59.37); Freya Anderson (54.89) | 4:07.03 |

=== Mixed events ===
| Games | Gold | | Silver | | Bronze | |
|---|---|---|---|---|---|---|
| 4×100 m freestyle | Russia; Mikhail Vekovishchev (50.07); Semen Shakhanov (49.32); Vasilissa Buinaia (55.01); Mariia Kameneva (55.07) | 3:29.47 | Hungary; Nándor Németh (50.59); Richárd Márton (50.01); Fanni Gyurinovics (55.54); Ajna Késely (55.48) | 3:31.62 | Italy; Giovanni Izzo (49.73); Alessandro Miressi (48.97); Sara Ongaro (56.45); Ilaria Cusinato (56.82) | 3:31.97 |
| 4×100 m medley | Italy; Tania Quaglieri (1:01.98); Nicolò Martinenghi (1:00.42); Ilaria Cusinato (1:00.04); Alessandro Miressi (48.31) | 3:50.75 | Russia; Kliment Kolesnikov (54.60); Vitaly Sukhoruchenko (1:02.16); Polina Egorova (59.29); Mariia Kameneva (55.28) | 3:51.33 | Great Britain; Elliot Clogg (56.44); David Murphy (1:02.34); Emily Large (59.39); Freya Anderson (54.72) | 3:52.89 |

== Medal table ==
* Host nation (Hungary)

| Rank | Nation | Gold | Silver | Bronze | Total |
|---|---|---|---|---|---|
| 1 | Russia | 11 | 5 | 6 | 22 |
| 2 | Italy | 9 | 8 | 5 | 22 |
| 3 | Great Britain | 5 | 4 | 10 | 19 |
| 4 | Hungary* | 5 | 4 | 3 | 12 |
| 5 | Spain | 2 | 3 | 1 | 6 |
| 6 | Poland | 2 | 1 | 4 | 7 |
| 7 | Germany | 1 | 2 | 2 | 5 |
| 8 | Sweden | 1 | 2 | 1 | 4 |
| 9 | Ukraine | 1 | 2 | 0 | 3 |
| 10 | Slovenia | 1 | 1 | 2 | 4 |
| 11 | Croatia | 1 | 1 | 1 | 3 |
| 12 | Denmark | 1 | 1 | 0 | 2 |
| 12 | Portugal | 1 | 1 | 0 | 2 |
| 14 | Serbia | 1 | 0 | 1 | 2 |
| 15 | Ireland | 0 | 2 | 1 | 3 |
| 16 | Czech Republic | 0 | 2 | 0 | 2 |
| 16 | Moldova | 0 | 2 | 0 | 2 |
| 18 | Bulgaria | 0 | 1 | 0 | 1 |
| 19 | Greece | 0 | 0 | 2 | 2 |
| 20 | Austria | 0 | 0 | 1 | 1 |
| 20 | Estonia | 0 | 0 | 1 | 1 |
| 20 | Finland | 0 | 0 | 1 | 1 |
| 20 | Israel | 0 | 0 | 1 | 1 |
| Totals (23 entries) | | 42 | 42 | 43 | 127 |
