= Ethan du Preez =

South African swimmer (born 2003)

Personal information
- Nationality: South Africa
- Born: 2003

Sport
- Sport: Swimming

Ethan du Preez (born 2003) is a South African swimmer. He competed in the 2020 Summer Olympics in the 200 metre butterfly event.
