= Josif Miladinov =

Bulgarian swimmer

Personal information
- Nationality: Bulgaria
- Born: 23 June 2003 (age 23) Plovdiv, Bulgaria
- Height: 1.89 m (6 ft 2 in)

Sport
- Sport: Swimming
Medal record
Men's swimming
Representing Bulgaria
European Championships (LC)
Silver medal – second place	2020 Budapest	100 m butterfly
World Junior Championships
Bronze medal – third place	2019 Budapest	50 m butterfly
European Junior Championships
Gold medal – first place	2021 Rome	50 m butterfly
Gold medal – first place	2021 Rome	100 m butterfly
Silver medal – second place	2019 Kazan	100 m butterfly

Josif Miladinov (born 23 June 2003) is a Bulgarian swimmer. He competed in the 2020 Summer Olympics. In 2025, he signed up to compete in the Enhanced Games.
