= Richárd Márton =

Hungarian swimmer (born 1999)

Personal information
- Nationality: Hungarian
- Born: 7 October 1999 (age 26) Budapest, Hungary
- Height: 1.85 m (6 ft 1 in)

Sport
- Sport: Swimming
Medal record
Men's swimming
Representing Hungary
European Championships (LC)
Gold medal – first place	2022 Rome	4×200 m freestyle
Gold medal – first place	2024 Belgrade	4×200 m mixed freestyle
Silver medal – second place	2022 Rome	200 m butterfly
Silver medal – second place	2024 Belgrade	4×200 m freestyle
Silver medal – second place	2026 Paris	200 m butterfly
Bronze medal – third place	2024 Belgrade	4×100 m mixed medley
World Junior Championships
Gold medal – first place	2017 Indianapolis	4×100 m freestyle
Gold medal – first place	2017 Indianapolis	4×200 m freestyle
European Junior Championships
Gold medal – first place	2017 Netanya	4×200 m freestyle
Gold medal – first place	2017 Netanya	4×100 m mixed freestyle
Silver medal – second place	2016 Hódmezővásárhely	4×100 m mixed freestyle
Silver medal – second place	2017 Netanya	4×100 m freestyle
Bronze medal – third place	2016 Hódmezővásárhely	200 m freestyle
Bronze medal – third place	2016 Hódmezővásárhely	400 m freestyle

Richárd Márton (born 7 October 1999) is a Hungarian swimmer. He competed in the men's 4 × 200 metre freestyle relay at the 2020 Summer Olympics.
