= Giacomo Carini =

Italian swimmer

Personal information
- Born: 2 July 1997 (age 28) Piacenza, Italy
- Height: 1.77 m (5 ft 10 in)
- Weight: 70 kg (154 lb)

Sport
- Sport: Swimming
- Strokes: Butterfly
Medal record
Representing Italy
| Event | 1st | 2nd | 3rd |
|---|---|---|---|
| European Games | 0 | 1 | 0 |
| Youth Olympic Games | 0 | 1 | 1 |
| Total | 0 | 2 | 1 |
European Games
| Silver medal – second place | 2015 Baku | 200 m butterfly |
Youth Olympic Games
| Silver medal – second place | 2014 Nanjing | 4×100 freestyle |
| Bronze medal – third place | 2014 Nanjing | 200 m butterfly |

Giacomo Carini (born 2 July 1997) is an Italian swimmer. He competed at the 2020 Summer Olympics, in 200 m butterfly.

== Career ==
He competed in the men's 100 metre butterfly event at the 2017 World Aquatics Championships. In 2014, he won the bronze medal in the boys' 200 metre butterfly at the 2014 Summer Youth Olympics held in Nanjing, China.
