= Ihor Troianovskyi =

Ukrainian swimmer (born 2002)

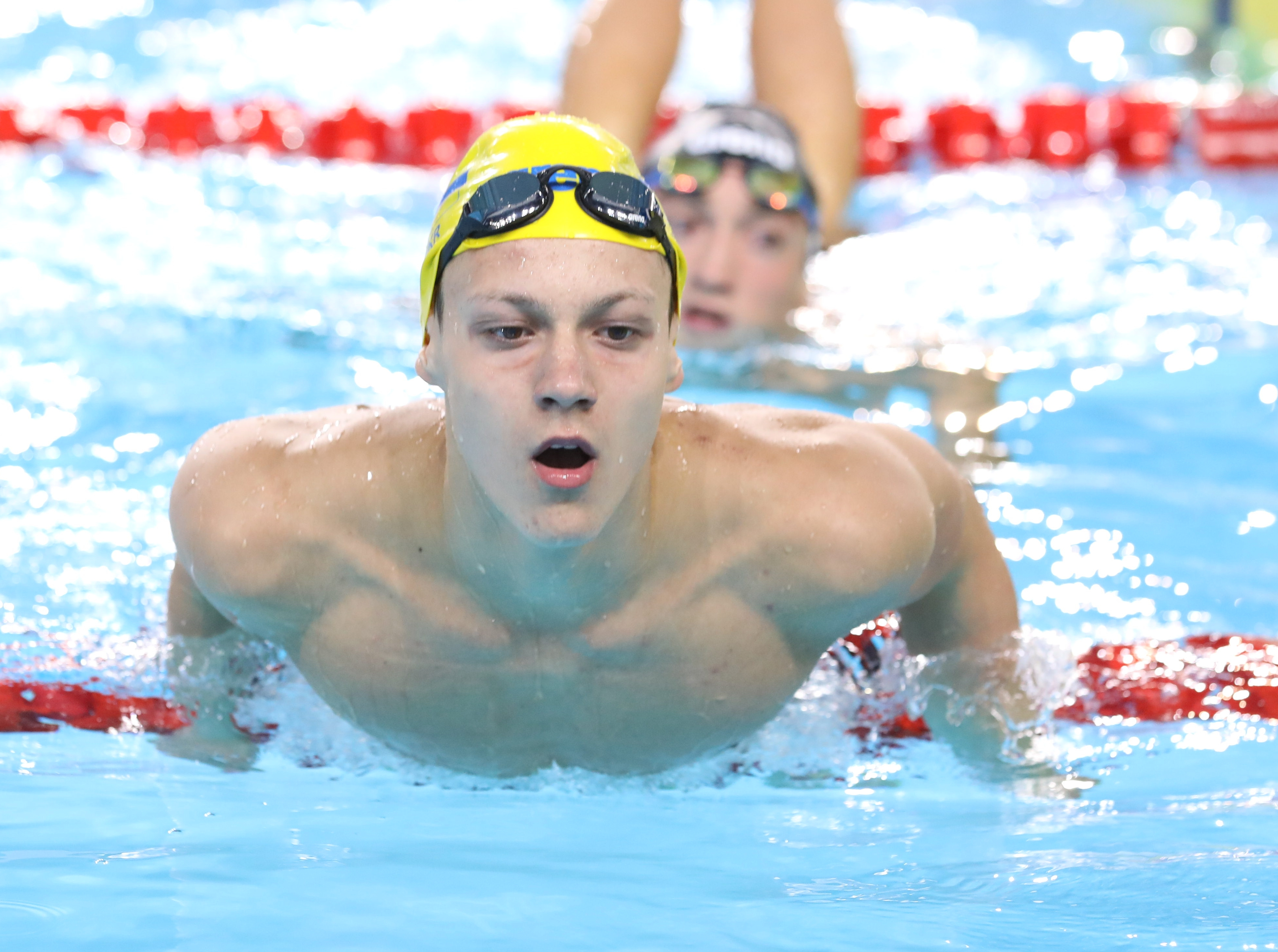
- Ihor Troianovskyi During Swimming Boys' 50m Butterfly Semifinal at 2018 Summer Youth Olympics

Personal information
- Native name: Ігор Трояновський
- Nationality: Ukraine
- Born: 9 August 2002 (age 23) Odesa, Ukraine

Sport
- Sport: Swimming
Medal record
Men's swimming
Representing Ukraine
European Junior Championships
Gold medal – first place	2019 Kazan	200 m butterfly

Ihor Troianovskyi (Ukrainian: Ігор Трояновський; born 9 August 2002) is a Ukrainian swimmer. He competed in the 2020 Summer Olympics.
