= Tamás Kenderesi =

Hungarian swimmer (born 1996)

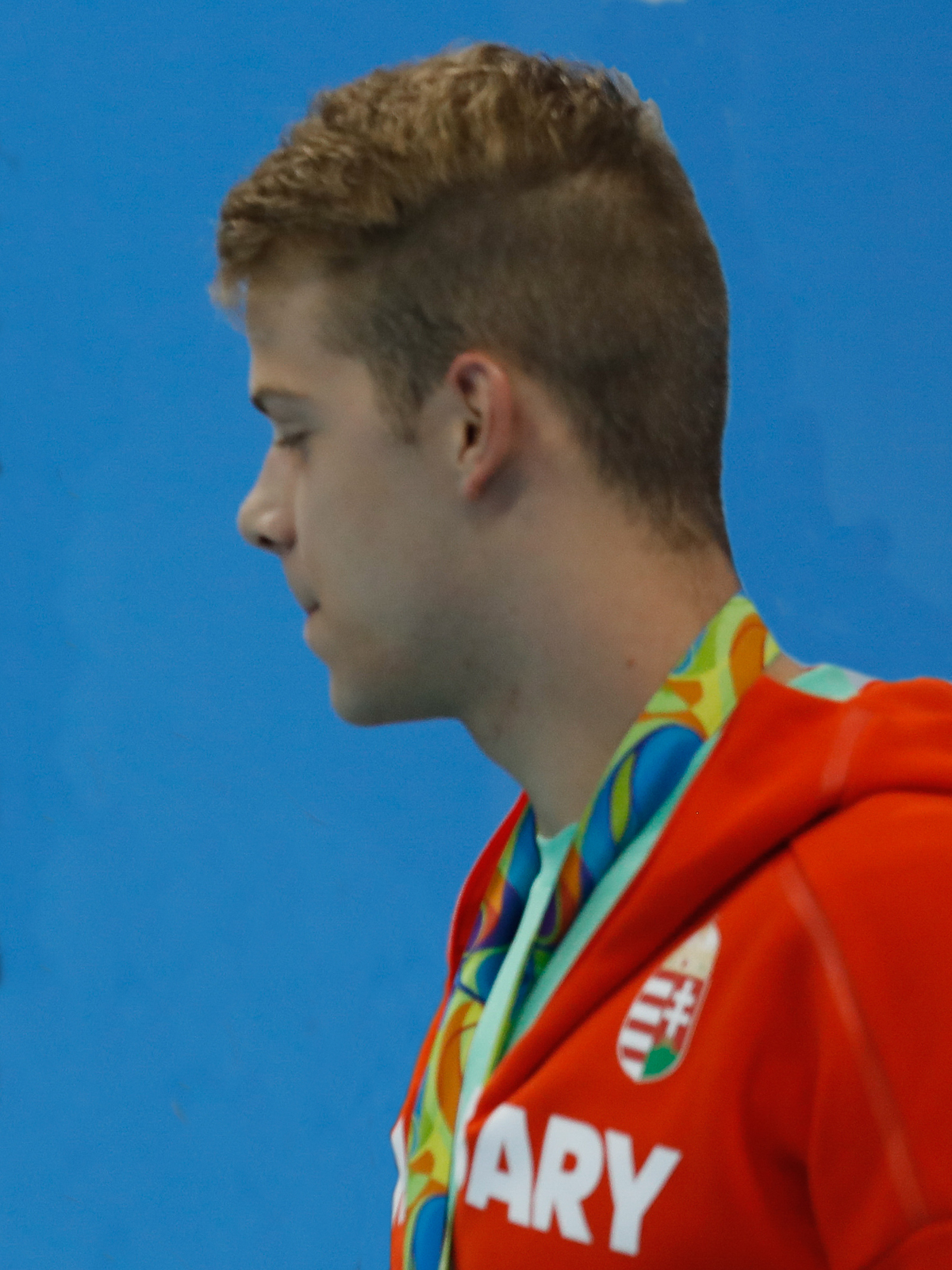

Personal information
- National team: Hungary
- Born: 13 December 1996 (age 29) Bonyhád, Hungary
- Height: 1.86 m (6 ft 1 in)
- Weight: 74 kg (163 lb)

Sport
- Sport: Swimming
- Strokes: Butterfly
- Club: Pécsi Sport Nonprofit Zrt.
- Coach: Imre Tari, András Hargitay
Medal record
Men's swimming
Representing Hungary
Olympic Games
Bronze medal – third place	2016 Rio de Janeiro	200 m butterfly
European Championships (LC)
Silver medal – second place	2018 Glasgow	200 m butterfly
Bronze medal – third place	2016 London	200 m butterfly
Bronze medal – third place	2020 Budapest	200 m butterfly
European Championships (SC)
Bronze medal – third place	2017 Copenhagen	200 m butterfly
Summer Youth Olympics
Gold medal – first place	2014 Nanjing	200 m butterfly
European Junior Championships
Gold medal – first place	2014 Dordrecht	200 m butterfly

Tamás Kenderesi (pronounced [ˈtɒmaːʃ ˈkɛndɛrɛʃi]; born 13 December 1996) is a Hungarian competitive swimmer who specializes in butterfly. He is an Olympics and European Championships bronze medalist, and Youth Olympics gold medalist swimmer.

He was born in Bonyhad, but his family is from Aparhant in Tolna county. His mother is a teacher, his father is a toolmaker/entrepreneur. Kenderesi is the oldest child with 3 younger brothers. He started swimming in Pecs under coach, Imre Tari. His current club is the Pecsi Sport Nonprofit.

Kenderesi is studying at the University of Pecs with a major in coaching. After his swimming career ends he wants to be a swimming coach and be as successful as in swimming.

== Career ==
In 2014 he won a gold medal in the 200 meter butterfly on the European Junior Swimming Championships, in Dordrecht. Later in 2014, Kenderesi swam at the Summer Youth Olympics in Nanjing, China. He placed 7th in the 100 meter butterfly and he won the 200 meter butterfly.

Kenderesi missed the 2015 World Aquatics Championships due to illness and he had to miss 3 months of practicing. Later the same year he swam at the European Short Course Championships which took place in Netanya, Israel, where he got 35th in the 100 meter butterfly and 9th in the 200 meter butterfly.

At the 2016 Summer Olympics in Rio de Janeiro, he qualified in first place for the semifinals in the 200 m butterfly, in which he qualified first for the final with a time of 1:53.96. He won the bronze medal with a time of 1:53.62.

In 2017 Kenderesi qualified for the 17th FINA World Championships, in Budapest where he placed 4th in the 200 meter butterfly. In December 2017 he won a bronze medal at the European Short Course Championships in Copenhagen, Denmark in the 200 meter butterfly.

=== 2019 sexual misconduct incident ===
Kenderesi was widely publicized in 2019 for an incident in South Korea that involved allegations of sexual misconduct. He was briefly banned from leaving South Korea at the conclusion of the 2019 World Aquatics Championships, after he was accused of committing an indecent act by compulsion in a night club. Kenderesi received a written warning from the Swimming Association and six month cancellation of benefits.

== Awards ==
- Cross of Merit of Hungary – Golden Cross (2016)
