= Federico Burdisso =

Italian swimmer (born 2001)

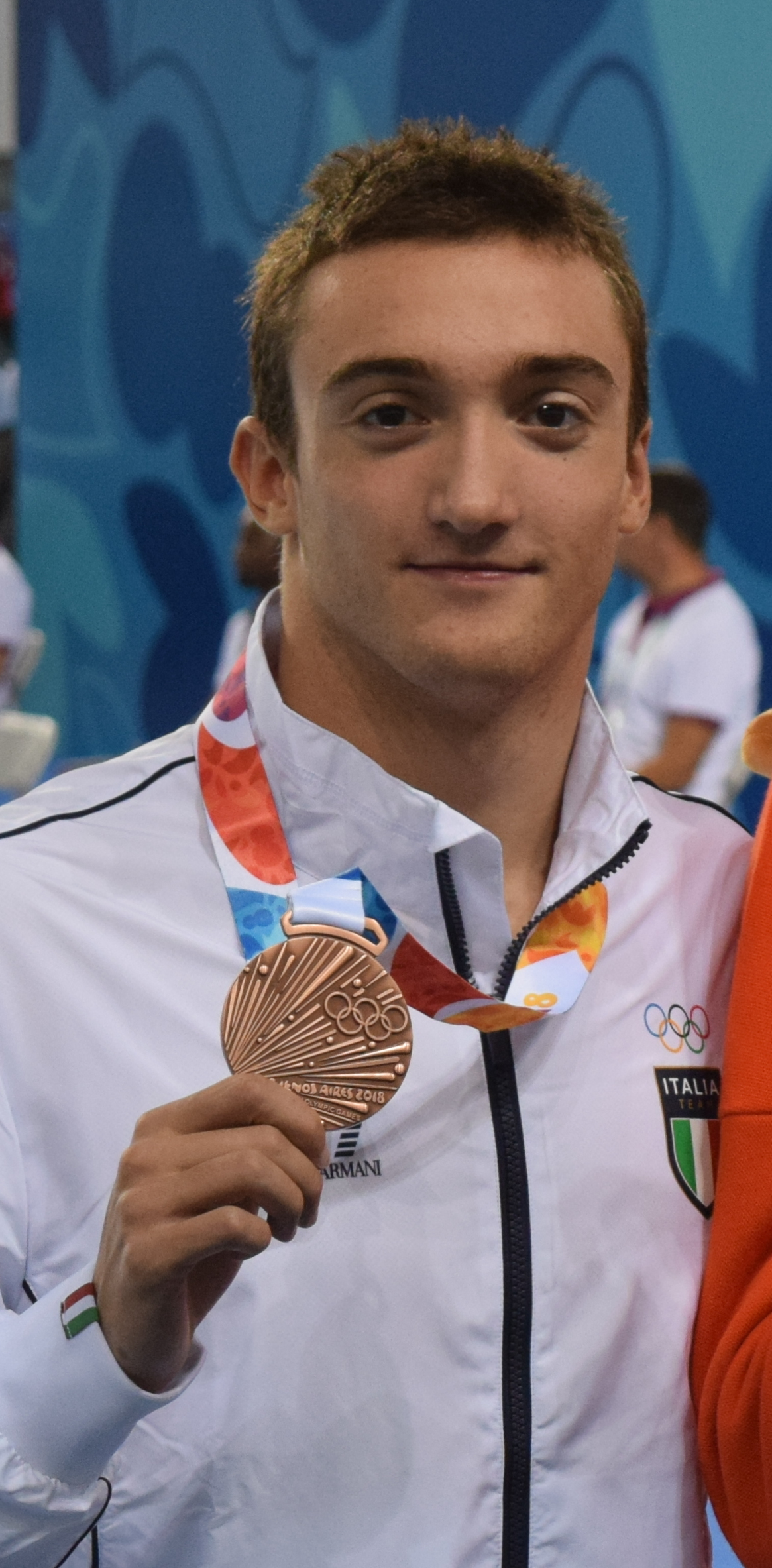
- Burdisso at 2018

Personal information
- Nationality: Italian
- Born: 20 September 2001 (age 25) Pavia, Italy
- Height: 1.80 m (5 ft 11 in)
- Weight: 73 kg (161 lb)

Sport
- Country: Italy
- Sport: Swimming
- Event: Butterfly
- University team: Northwestern University
- Club: Mount Kelly Swimming
- Coached by: Emma Collings-Barnes
Medal record
Representing Italy
Olympic Games
Bronze medal – third place	2020 Tokyo	200 m butterfly
Bronze medal – third place	2020 Tokyo	4×100 m medley
World Championships (LC)
Gold medal – first place	2022 Budapest	4×100 m medley
Bronze medal – third place	2024 Doha	4×100 m medley
European Championships (LC)
Gold medal – first place	2022 Roma	4×100 m medley
Silver medal – second place	2020 Budapest	200 m butterfly
Bronze medal – third place	2018 Glasgow	200 m butterfly
Bronze medal – third place	2020 Budapest	4×100 m medley
Summer Youth Olympics
Bronze medal – third place	2018 Buenos Aires	100 m butterfly
Bronze medal – third place	2018 Buenos Aires	200 m butterfly
Bronze medal – third place	2018 Buenos Aires	4×100 m freestyle
European Youth Olympic Festival
Gold medal – first place	2017 Győr	50 m freestyle
Gold medal – first place	2017 Győr	200 m butterfly
Silver medal – second place	2017 Győr	4×100 m freestyle
Silver medal – second place	2017 Győr	4×100 m mixed freestyle
Bronze medal – third place	2017 Győr	100 m butterfly
Bronze medal – third place	2017 Győr	4×100 m medley
World Junior Championships
Silver medal – second place	2019 Budapest	100 m butterfly
Bronze medal – third place	2019 Budapest	200 m butterfly

Federico Burdisso (born 20 September 2001) is an Italian swimmer. He won a bronze medal in Men's 200 metre butterfly, and Men's 4 × 100 metre medley relay, at the 2020 Summer Olympics.

== Career ==
He won a bronze medal at the 2018 European Championships.

He qualified to represent Italy at the 2020 Summer Olympics.

At the 2022 World Aquatics Championships, Burdisso split a 50.63 for the butterfly leg of the 4×100 metre medley relay in the final to help win the gold medal in a European record and Italian record time of 3:27.51.

== Background ==
He studied and trained at Mount Kelly School from 2017 to 2019. He currently competes collegiately for Northwestern University.
