= Jakub Majerski =

Polish swimmer (born 2000)

Personal information
- Nationality: Polish
- Born: 18 August 2000 (age 26)
- Height: 1.84 m (6 ft 0 in)

Sport
- Sport: Swimming
- Strokes: Butterfly, Freestyle
Medal record
Men's swimming
Representing Poland
World Championships (LC)
Bronze medal – third place	2024 Doha	100 m butterfly
World Championships (SC)
Bronze medal – third place	2024 Budapest	4×100 m freestyle
European Championships (LC)
Bronze medal – third place	2022 Rome	100 m butterfly
Bronze medal – third place	2024 Belgrade	100 m butterfly
European Championships (SC)
Bronze medal – third place	2021 Kazan	100 m butterfly
Bronze medal – third place	2021 Kazan	4x50 m mixed freestyle
Youth Olympic Games
Bronze medal – third place	2018 Buenos Aires	4×100 m medley
World University Games
Gold medal – first place	2021 Chengdu	100 m butterfly
Silver medal – second place	2021 Chengdu	50 m butterfly
Silver medal – second place	2021 Chengdu	4×100 m mixed medley

Jakub Majerski (born 18 August 2000) is a Polish swimmer. He competed in the mixed 4 × 100 metre medley relay at the 2020 Summer Olympics.
