= Joan Lluís Pons =

Spanish swimmer (born 1996)

Personal information
- Full name: Joan Lluís Pons Ramón
- Nickname: Joanllu
- Nationality: Spanish
- Born: 9 December 1996 (age 29) Sóller, Mallorca, Spain
- Height: 1.70 m (5 ft 7 in)
- Weight: 62 kg (137 lb)

Sport
- Country: Spain
- Sport: Swimming
- Event: 400 metre medley
- Team: CN Palma de Mallorca
- Coached by: José Antonio del Castillo

Achievements and titles
- Olympic finals: Río de Janeiro 2016 – 8th 400 m medley
Medal record
European Championships (LC)
Bronze medal – third place	2018 Glasgow	400 m medley

Joan Lluís Pons Ramón (born 9 December 1996) is a Spanish swimmer. His speciality is 400 metres medley.

He competed at the 2016 Summer Olympics in Rio de Janeiro. In 2018 he won the silver in 400 m. medley at Mediterranean Games in Tarragona.
