= Antani Ivanov =

Bulgarian swimmer (born 1999)

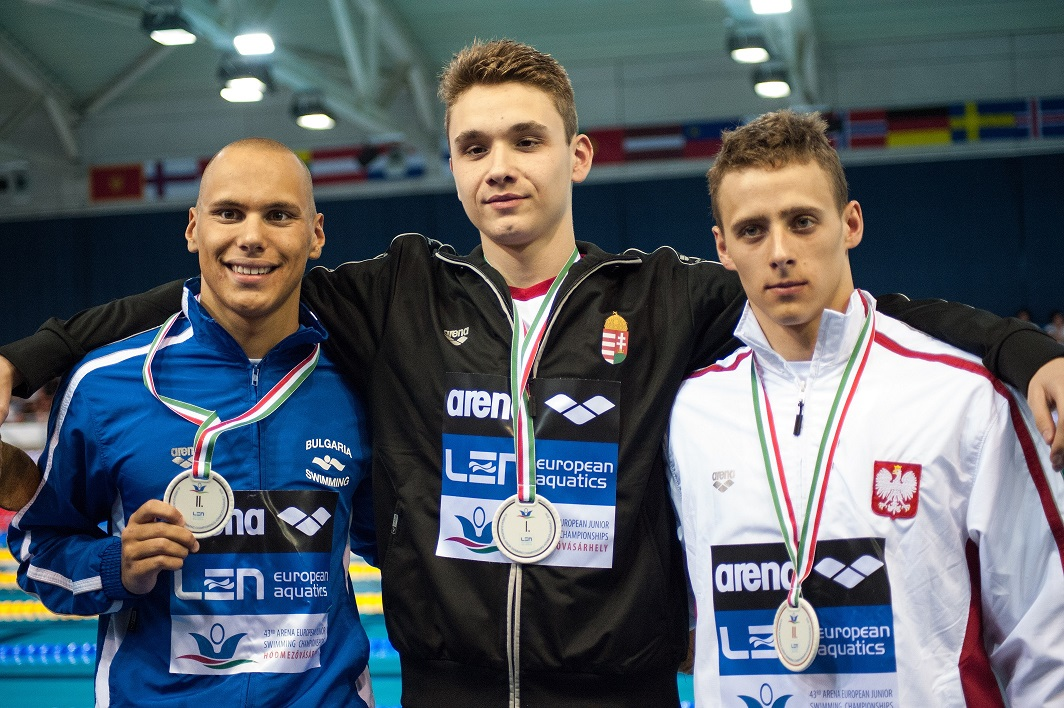
- Antani Ivanov (left) at the 2016 European Junior Swimming Championships

Personal information
- Nationality: Bulgarian
- Born: 17 July 1999 (age 26) Veliko Tarnovo, Bulgaria
- Height: 1.80 m (5 ft 11 in)
- Weight: 77 kg (170 lb)

Sport
- Sport: Swimming
- Strokes: Butterfly
- College team: Virginia Tech
Medal record
Men's swimming
Representing Bulgaria
Event	1st	2nd	3rd
World Junior Championships	0	0	1
European Junior Championships	0	1	0
Total	0	1	1
World Junior Championships
Bronze medal – third place	2017 Indianapolis	200 m butterfly
European Junior Championships
Silver medal – second place	2016 Hódmezővásárhely	200 m butterfly
Representing the Virginia Tech Hokies
Event	1st	2nd	3rd
NCAA Championships	0	0	1
Total	0	0	1
NCAA Championships
Bronze medal – third place	2021 Greensboro	200 m butterfly

Antani Ivanov (Bulgarian: Антъни Иванов, born 17 July 1999) is a Bulgarian swimmer. He competed in the men's 50 metre butterfly, men's 100 metre butterfly and men's 200 metre butterfly events at the 2017 World Aquatics Championships. He finished 38th in the 50 metre butterfly, 41st in the 100 metre butterfly and 8th in the 200 metre butterfly, setting a national record of 1:55.55 in the heats. His final in the 200 metre was the first for a Bulgarian swimmer since Mihail Alexandrov's 6th place at the 2007 World Aquatics Championships men's 100 metre breaststroke.

He has qualified to represent Bulgaria at the 2020 Summer Olympics in the men's 200 metre butterfly event.
