= Denys Kesil =

Ukrainian swimmer (born 2000)

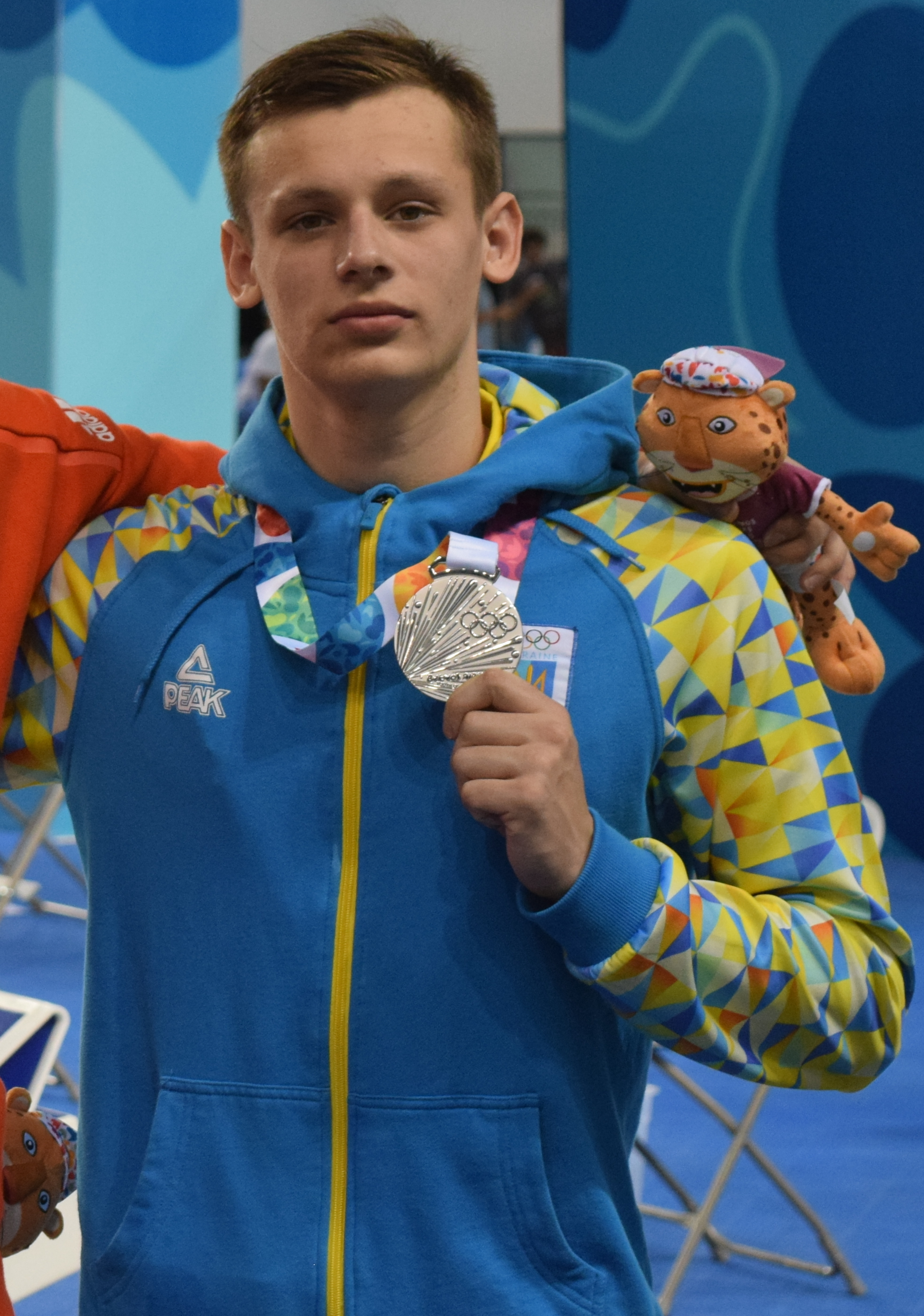
- Denys Kesil in 2018

Personal information
- Native name: Денис Сергійович Кесіль
- Full name: Denys Serhiyovych Kesil
- Born: 26 October 2000 (age 25) Kryvyi Rih, Ukraine

Sport
- Sport: Swimming
Medal record
Men's swimming
Representing Ukraine
Military World Games
Silver medal – second place	2019 Wuhan	200 m butterfly
Summer Youth Olympics
Silver medal – second place	2018 Buenos Aires	200 m butterfly
European Junior Championships
Bronze medal – third place	2017 Netanya	200 m butterfly
Bronze medal – third place	2018 Helsinki	200 m butterfly

Denys Serhiyovych Kesil (Ukrainian: Денис Сергійович Кесіль; born 26 October 2000) is a Ukrainian swimmer.

== Career ==
He represented Ukraine at the 2019 World Aquatics Championships held in Gwangju, South Korea. In the same year, he won the silver medal in the men's 200 metre butterfly event at the 2019 Military World Games held in Wuhan, China.

In 2018, he represented Ukraine at the Summer Youth Olympics in Buenos Aires, Argentina. He won the silver medal in the boys' 200 metre butterfly event. He also competed in the boys' 50 metre butterfly and boys' 100 metre butterfly events.

In 2021, he represented Ukraine at the belated 2020 Summer Olympics in Tokyo, placing twenty-first in the men's 200 meter butterfly event.

In 2024, he again represented Ukraine at the 2024 Summer Olympics in Paris, placing twenty-fourth in the men's 200 meter butterfly event.
