= Chad le Clos =

South African swimmer (born 1992)

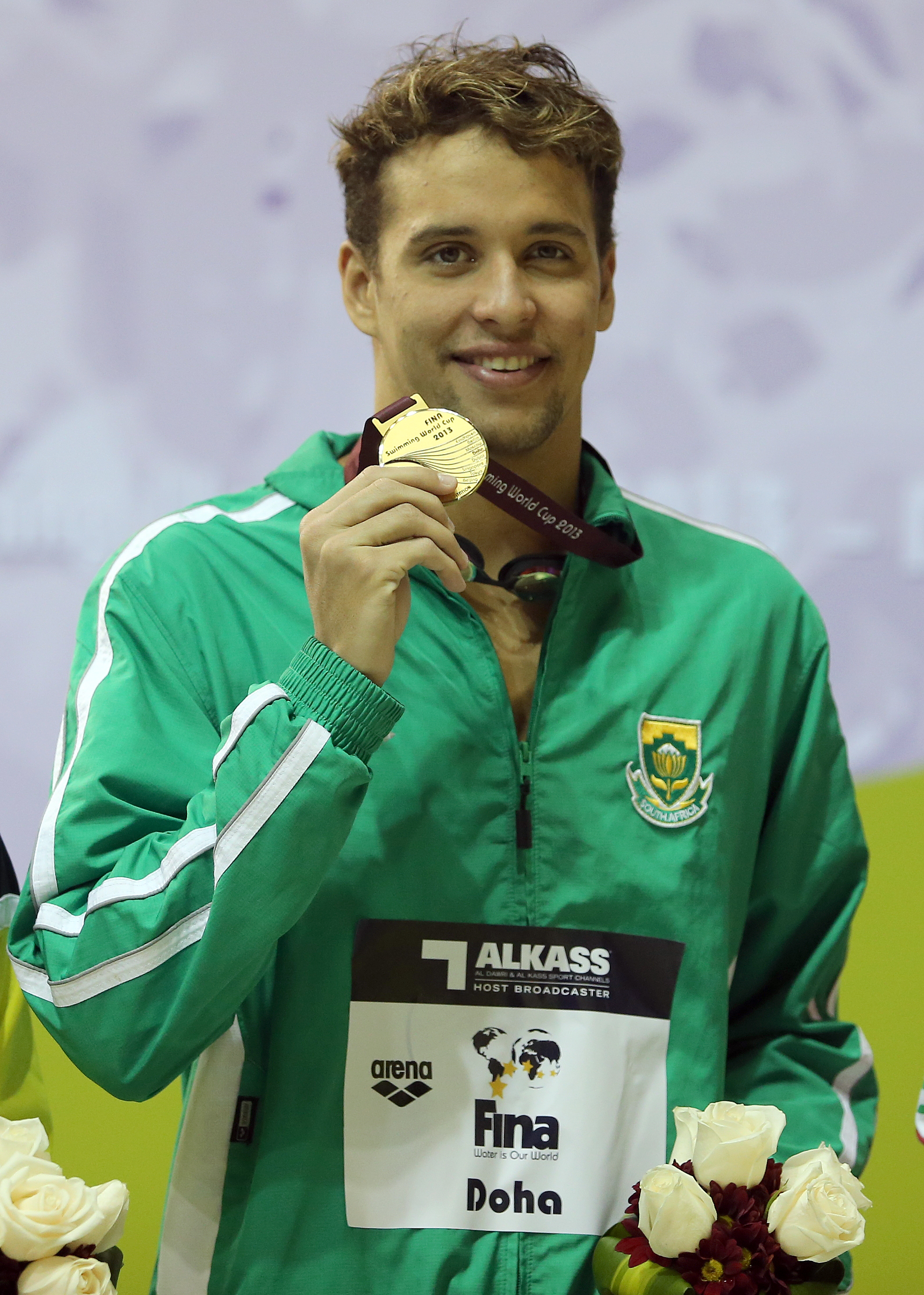
- Le Clos in 2013

Personal information
- Full name: Chad Guy Bertrand le Clos
- National team: South Africa
- Born: 12 April 1992 (age 34) Durban, Natal, South Africa
- Height: 1.88 m (6 ft 2 in)
- Weight: 84 kg (185 lb)

Sport
- Sport: Swimming
- Strokes: Butterfly, freestyle, individual medley
- Club: Energy Standard
- Coach: Dirk Lange
Medal record
Men's swimming
Representing South Africa
Event	1st	2nd	3rd
Olympic Games	1	3	0
World Championships (LC)	4	1	2
World Championships (SC)	12	5	3
Commonwealth Games	7	5	9
African Games	9	1	0
African Championships	1	1	2
Total	34	16	16
Olympic Games
Gold medal – first place	2012 London	200 m butterfly
Silver medal – second place	2012 London	100 m butterfly
Silver medal – second place	2016 Rio de Janeiro	200 m freestyle
Silver medal – second place	2016 Rio de Janeiro	100 m butterfly
World Championships (LC)
Gold medal – first place	2013 Barcelona	100 m butterfly
Gold medal – first place	2013 Barcelona	200 m butterfly
Gold medal – first place	2015 Kazan	100 m butterfly
Gold medal – first place	2017 Budapest	200 m butterfly
Silver medal – second place	2015 Kazan	200 m butterfly
Bronze medal – third place	2019 Gwangju	100 m butterfly
Bronze medal – third place	2019 Gwangju	200 m butterfly
World Championships (SC)
Gold medal – first place	2010 Dubai	200 m butterfly
Gold medal – first place	2012 Istanbul	100 m butterfly
Gold medal – first place	2014 Doha	200 m freestyle
Gold medal – first place	2014 Doha	50 m butterfly
Gold medal – first place	2014 Doha	100 m butterfly
Gold medal – first place	2014 Doha	200 m butterfly
Gold medal – first place	2016 Windsor	50 m butterfly
Gold medal – first place	2016 Windsor	100 m butterfly
Gold medal – first place	2016 Windsor	200 m butterfly
Gold medal – first place	2018 Hangzhou	100 m butterfly
Gold medal – first place	2022 Melbourne	200 m butterfly
Gold medal – first place	2022 Melbourne	100 m butterfly
Silver medal – second place	2012 Istanbul	50 m butterfly
Silver medal – second place	2016 Windsor	200 m freestyle
Silver medal – second place	2018 Hangzhou	50 m butterfly
Silver medal – second place	2018 Hangzhou	200 m butterfly
Silver medal – second place	2021 Abu Dhabi	100 m butterfly
Bronze medal – third place	2014 Doha	4×200 m freestyle
Bronze medal – third place	2018 Hangzhou	100 m freestyle
Bronze medal – third place	2021 Abu Dhabi	200 m butterfly
Commonwealth Games
Gold medal – first place	2010 Delhi	200 m butterfly
Gold medal – first place	2010 Delhi	400 m medley
Gold medal – first place	2014 Glasgow	100 m butterfly
Gold medal – first place	2014 Glasgow	200 m butterfly
Gold medal – first place	2018 Gold Coast	50 m butterfly
Gold medal – first place	2018 Gold Coast	100 m butterfly
Gold medal – first place	2018 Gold Coast	200 m butterfly
Silver medal – second place	2010 Delhi	4×100 m medley
Silver medal – second place	2014 Glasgow	4×100 m freestyle
Silver medal – second place	2018 Gold Coast	100 m freestyle
Silver medal – second place	2022 Birmingham	200 m butterfly
Silver medal – second place	2026 Glasgow	4×100 m mixed relay
Bronze medal – third place	2010 Delhi	4×100 m freestyle
Bronze medal – third place	2010 Delhi	4×200 m freestyle
Bronze medal – third place	2014 Glasgow	50 m butterfly
Bronze medal – third place	2014 Glasgow	200 m medley
Bronze medal – third place	2014 Glasgow	4×200 m freestyle
Bronze medal – third place	2014 Glasgow	4×100 m medley
Bronze medal – third place	2018 Gold Coast	4×100 m medley
Bronze medal – third place	2026 Glasgow	4×100 m freestyle
Bronze medal – third place	2026 Glasgow	4×100 m medley
African Games
Gold medal – first place	2011 Maputo	200 m butterfly
Gold medal – first place	2011 Maputo	200 m medley
Gold medal – first place	2011 Maputo	400 m medley
Gold medal – first place	2011 Maputo	4×100 m freestyle
Gold medal – first place	2011 Maputo	4×100 m medley
Gold medal – first place	2015 Brazzaville	50 m butterfly
Gold medal – first place	2015 Brazzaville	100 m butterfly
Gold medal – first place	2015 Brazzaville	4×200 m freestyle
Gold medal – first place	2015 Brazzaville	4×100 m mixed freestyle
Silver medal – second place	2011 Maputo	100 m butterfly
African Championships
Gold medal – first place	2016 Bloemfontein	100 m butterfly
Silver medal – second place	2008 Johannesburg	200 m medley
Bronze medal – third place	2008 Johannesburg	50 m breaststroke
Bronze medal – third place	2008 Johannesburg	200 m breaststroke
Youth Olympic Games
Gold medal – first place	2010 Singapore	200 m medley
Silver medal – second place	2010 Singapore	100 m butterfly
Silver medal – second place	2010 Singapore	200 m butterfly
Silver medal – second place	2010 Singapore	400 m freestyle
Bronze medal – third place	2010 Singapore	4×100 m freestyle

Chad Guy Bertrand le Clos, OIS (born 12 April 1992) is a South African competitive swimmer who is an Olympic, World and Commonwealth Games champion. He is the African record, Commonwealth record, and South African record holder in the short course and long course 200-metre butterfly and the short course 100-metre butterfly. He also holds African and South African records in the long course 200-metre freestyle and 100-metre butterfly, as well as the short course 100-metre freestyle. Formerly, he was a world record holder in the short course 100-metre butterfly and 200-metre butterfly.

At the 2012 Summer Olympics, he won a gold medal in the 200-metre butterfly and a silver medal in the 100-metre butterfly, as well as silver medals in the 200-metre freestyle and 100-metre butterfly at the 2016 Summer Olympics. He won five total medals at the 2010 Summer Youth Olympics. Le Clos has won the Swimming World Cup overall male winner title four times: 2011, 2013, 2014, and 2017. Across the 2010, 2014, 2018 and 2022 Commonwealth Games, he has won a total of 18 medals, including seven gold medals, four silver medals, and seven bronze medals. He has won a total of 19 medals, 12 gold medals, 5 silver medals, and 2 bronze medals, in individual events at Short Course World Championships.

At the 2014 Commonwealth Games, he tied the record set by Ian Thorpe for the most number of medals won at a single Commonwealth Games with seven medals. He became South Africa's most decorated Olympian when he won his fourth Olympic medal at the 2016 Summer Olympics. In 2017, he became the first male to win the overall title in the Swimming World Cup four times. Upon his completion of the 2018 Swimming World Cup, he won the Guinness World Record for "most gold medals won in the FINA Swimming World Cup by a male swimmer" for the 143 gold medals he won between 2009 and 2018, inclusive. In the same year, he became the most decorated Commonwealth Games swimmer, with 17 total medals, and the first man to win the Commonwealth Games title in the 200-metre butterfly three times in a row. At the 2026 Commonwealth Games in Glasgow, Le Clos won three relay medals: silver in the mixed 4×100 metre medley relay, bronze in the men's 4×100 metre freestyle relay and bronze in the men's 4×100 metre medley relay. The final medal raised his career total to 21, making him the most decorated athlete in Commonwealth Games history.

== Background ==
Le Clos's father Bert Le Clos is Mauritian, and moved to South Africa at the age of nine, where he met Le Clos's mother, Geraldine, who is of South African descent. He attended Westville Boys' High School in Durban, South Africa, the school named their main pool after him, matriculating in 2010. He started competing when he was ten years old, after first joining a local swim club based in Durban, named the Seagulls Swimming Club when he was eight years old. He has a younger brother, Jordan, who is also a competitive swimmer.

== 2010–2011 ==
=== 2010 Commonwealth Games ===
2010 Commonwealth Games
Gold medal – first place	200 m butterfly	1:56.48 (GR)
Gold medal – first place	400 m individual medley	4:13.25 (GR)
Silver medal – second place	4×100 m medley	3:36.12
Bronze medal – third place	4×100 m freestyle	3:15.21 (h)
Bronze medal – third place	4×200 m freestyle	7:14.18

At the 2010 Commonwealth Games in New Delhi, India in October, Le Clos collected two gold medals, one silver medal, and two bronze medals. On the first day of the swimming competition, he won the gold medal and Commonwealth title in the 200-metre butterfly with a Games record time of 1:56.48. His medal was the first medal for South Africa at the 2010 Commonwealth Games as well as his first medal at a Commonwealth Games. The same day, he contributed a split of 50.15 seconds for the third leg of the 4×100-metre freestyle relay in the preliminary heats and won a bronze medal when the finals relay placed third in 3:15.21. Two days later, as part of the 4×200-metre freestyle relay, Le Clos won his third medal, a bronze medal, helping achieve a third-place finish in the final with a 7:14.18 after helping qualify the relay to the final in the preliminary heats. The fourth day, he placed 17th in the preliminary heats of the 100-metre butterfly with a time of 56.56 seconds. Later in the day, he won his second gold medal and Commonwealth title of the Games, this time in the 400-metre individual medley, where he set a new Games record with his time of 4:13.25. On day five, he placed fifth in the final of the 200-metre individual medley with a time of 2:00.74. For his final event, the 4×100-metre medley relay, he split a 52.98 for the butterfly leg of the relay in the final to help win the silver medal in a time of 3:36.12.

=== 2010 Short Course World Championships ===
At the World Short Course Championships in Dubai, Le Clos won the gold medal in the 200-metre butterfly. He narrowly beat South African Dekota Morris by 0.05 of a second and South African Donovan Marais, the 2008 Olympic silver medalist, by 0.11 of a second.

=== 2011 Long Course World Championships ===
At the 2011 World Aquatics Championships in Shanghai, he finished fifth in the 200-metre butterfly, 13th in the 100-metre butterfly and 10th in the 4 × 100 m medley relay with his teammates.

== 2012–2013 ==
=== 2012 Summer Olympics ===
2012 Summer Olympics
Gold medal – first place	200 m butterfly	1:52.96 (AF)
Silver medal – second place	100 m butterfly	51.44

On the first day of the 2012 Summer Olympics in London, Le Clos finished fifth in the 400m individual medley. On the 4th day, Le Clos won the gold medal in the 200m butterfly in 1min 52.96 sec, edging out the two-time defending Olympic champion and world record holder, Michael Phelps, by 0.05 seconds. In personal information given to the media, Le Clos had stated before the games that his sporting hero is Michael Phelps. He later said that beating his hero was unexpected. The next day Le Clos qualified for the final of the 200m individual medley by swimming the (tied) 7th time in the semi-finals, but he withdrew to focus on the 100m butterfly. On the 7th day of the competition, Le Clos won the silver medal in the 100m butterfly, tied with Yevgeny Korotyshkin in a time of 51.44 sec, at 0.23 sec behind Phelps.

During the 2012 Games, Le Clos's father, Bert le Clos, became an instant media personality after being interviewed on British television about his son's achievement in winning a gold medal.

=== 2013 Long Course World Championships ===
After his Olympic success, Le Clos came into the World Championships as a threat. However, Le Clos shortened his program this year, only deciding to participate in the butterfly events. In his first event, the 50-metre butterfly, Le Clos came 23rd with a time of 23.76, unable to advance to the semi-finals. In his signature event, the 200-metre butterfly, after easily breezing into the final, he followed his win at the Olympics, where he won with a 1:54.32. He finished off his schedule by winning the 100-metre fly with a new national record of 51.06, ending the championships on a good note.

=== 2013 Swimming World Cup ===
At the 2013 Swimming World Cup stop in Eindhoven, Netherlands in August 2013, Le Clos broke the short course 200 metre butterfly world record of 1:49.11, set by Kaio de Almeida of Brazil in 2009, in the final 200 metre butterfly with a time of 1:49.04, which also earned him a World Cup record and the gold medal in the event. Later in the World Cup circuit, Le Clos broke the 200 metre butterfly world record a second time, this time breaking his own world record and World Cup record with a time of 1:48.56 at the stop in Singapore, Singapore in November, making him the first swimmer to finish the event in less than 1:49.00.

== 2014–2015 ==
=== 2014 Commonwealth Games ===
2014 Commonwealth Games
Gold medal – first place	200 m butterfly	1:55.07 (GR)
Gold medal – first place	100 m butterfly	51.29 (GR)
Silver medal – second place	4×100 m freestyle	3:15.17
Bronze medal – third place	50 m butterfly	23.36
Bronze medal – third place	4×200 m freestyle	7:10.36
Bronze medal – third place	200 m individual medley	1:58.85
Bronze medal – third place	4×100 m medley	3:34.47

In July 2014, at the 2014 Commonwealth Games, held at Tollcross International Swimming Centre in Glasgow, Scotland, Le Clos won seven total medals, including two gold medals, one silver medal, and four bronze medals. His seven medals tied the record for the most number of medals won in a single Commonwealth Games set by Australian Ian Thorpe in 2002. With his 12 total medals from the 2010 and 2014 Commonwealth Games, Le Clos tied Roland Schoeman for being South Africa's most decorated Commonwealth Games swimmer.

On the second day of swimming competition, in his first event of the Games, the 50-metre butterfly, Le Clos won the bronze medal in the final with a time of 23.36 seconds, finishing behind gold medalist Ben Proud of England and silver medalist and fellow South African Roland Schoeman. He won a silver medal later in the same session, leading off the 4×100-metre freestyle relay with a 48.53 to contribute to the final time of 3:15.17. The following day, he won a gold medal in the 200-metre butterfly with a new Games record time of 1:55.07, lowering the record he set in the event in 2010 by over one full second. On The fourth day, he won a bronze medal as part of the 4×200-metre freestyle relay, helping achieve a mark of 7:10.36 in the final by splitting a 1:47.13 for the second leg of the relay. In the final of the 100-metre butterfly the following day, Le Clos won the gold medal with a Games record time of 51.29 seconds, finishing 0.40 seconds ahead of silver medalist in the event Joseph Schooling of Singapore. On the sixth and final day, he won his sixth medal in his sixth event, winning the bronze medal in the 200-metre individual medley with a time of 1:58.85. In his seventh and final event, 4×100-metre medley relay, Le Clos swam the 100-metre butterfly portion of the relay in 51.05 seconds to help win the bronze medal and achieve a time of 3:34.47 in the final with relay teammates Sebastien Rousseau (backstroke), Cameron van der Burgh (breaststroke), and Leith Shankland (freestyle).

=== 2014 Short Course World Championships ===
Le Clos won four gold medals out of a possible four gold medals in his individual events at the 2014 World Short Course Swimming Championships in Doha, Qatar in December, which included winning the 50-metre butterfly, 100-metre butterfly, 200-metre butterfly, and 200-metre freestyle. His winning time of 48.44 seconds in the 100-metre butterfly set a new world record and a new Championships record.

=== 2015 Long Course World Championships ===
Le Clos finished 14th in the semifinals of the 50 meter butterfly and 6th in the 200m freestyle. He finished second in the 200m butterfly, at 0.2 seconds behind László Cseh. He successfully defended his 2013 title in the 100m butterfly by winning the gold medal in a personal best time of 50.56. Le Clos and Michael Phelps, who was swimming at the US national championships at the same time and posted slightly faster times in the 100 and 200m butterfly events, exchanged comments about each other's times, which set up a rivalry for the 2016 Olympics.

== 2016 ==
=== 2016 Summer Olympics ===
2016 Summer Olympics
Silver medal – second place	200 m freestyle	1:45.20 (AF)
Silver medal – second place	100 m butterfly	51.14

Le Clos won the silver medal in the 200 metre freestyle event, finishing behind China's Sun Yang in a time of 1:45.20 to become one of South Africa's most decorated Olympians. The medal itself was quite a surprise for many, as Le Clos, primarily known as a butterfly specialist, had to overcome placement in one of the outside lanes and the presence of far more established freestylers in the field, such as the world record holder Paul Biedermann, reigning world champion James Guy, and the eventual bronze medalist Conor Dwyer.

Le Clos finished 4th in the 200 metre butterfly in which he was the defending champion, in a race he called the worst of his career, as he was second behind Phelps for much of the race before fading in the closing meters. The event was heavily hyped as a rematch between Le Clos and Michael Phelps, the 2004 and 2008 winner whom Le Clos had narrowly beaten in 2012. The relationship between Le Clos and Phelps had been cordial in 2012–2013, but it deteriorated in 2014 when Phelps came back from retirement. In the ready room before the preliminary race, Le Clos's shadow boxing while Phelps "glowered in a corner" spawned the Internet meme with the hashtag #PhelpsFace. Le Clos's Wikipedia biography was even vandalized repeatedly.

Le Clos won a second silver medal in the 100 metre butterfly, in a three-way tie with rivals Phelps and László Cseh, behind Joseph Schooling. He said in the aftermath of the event to have been very disappointed with his overall showing in Rio but already had firm plans on continuing until the 2020 Games in Tokyo. Despite not being satisfied with his Rio showing, he still became South Africa's most decorated Olympian ever with four medals – one gold, three silver.

Since the Rio Olympics, Le Clos has repeatedly demanded that his silver medal in 200-meter freestyle swimming be upgraded to gold because of Sun Yang's previous anti-doping violation.

=== 2016 Short Course World Championships ===
At the 2016 World Short Course Championships in Windsor, Canada in December, Le Clos broke his world and Championships records in the final of the 100 metre butterfly with a 48.08 to win the gold medal. Le Clos also won gold medals in the 50 metre butterfly with a time of 21.98 seconds and the 200 metre butterfly in 1:48.76, a silver medal in the 200 metre freestyle in 1:41.65, placed sixth in the 4×50 metre freestyle relay final at 1:25.61 and came in 30th in the 100 metre freestyle with a time of 48.31 seconds.

== 2017–2018 ==
=== 2017 Long Course World Championships ===
He won another major title in the 200-metre butterfly, beating rival and home-country favourite László Cseh at the 2017 World Aquatic Swimming Championships.

=== 2017 Swimming World Cup ===
Le Clos won the overall male title in the 2017 Swimming World Cup, marking his fourth time winning the title after doing so in 2011, 2013, and 2014, and became the first male swimmer to achieve the four-time overall winner feat.

=== 2018 Commonwealth Games ===
2018 Commonwealth Games
Gold medal – first place	50 m butterfly	23.37
Gold medal – first place	200 m butterfly	1:54.00 (GR)
Gold medal – first place	100 m butterfly	50.65 (GR)
Silver medal – second place	100 m freestyle	48.15
Bronze medal – third place	4×100 m medley	3:34.79

At the 2018 Commonwealth Games in Gold Coast, Australia, Le Clos earned three gold medals in individual events, one silver medal in an individual event, and one bronze medal in a relay event. By the end of the Games, his medal count (17 total medals from 2010 through 2018) made him the most decorated Commonwealth Games swimmer, and he left just one medal shy of tying for the most decorated title across all sports, a title shared by sport shooter Phillips Adams of Australia and sport shooter Mick Gault of England.

Beginning his first finals session on the second day of swimming competition, Le Clos started a busy session by winning the gold medal in the 50-metre butterfly with a time of 23.37 seconds. For his second final of the session, he placed seventh in the 200-metre freestyle in 1:47.46, finishing less than two seconds behind gold medalist Kyle Chalmers of Australia. In his third and final event of the session, he helped the 4×100-metre freestyle relay place sixth in 3:17.27, splitting a 47.97 for the second leg of the relay. The following day, he won his third consecutive Commonwealth Games title and gold medal in the 200-metre butterfly, setting a new Games record with his winning time of 1:54.00. His win made him the first man to win three consecutive Commonwealth Games titles in the 200-metre butterfly. It also marked the second time a man won the same event three consecutive times at the Commonwealth Games.

In the 100-metre freestyle final on day four, Le Clos faced off against Scottish Olympian Duncan Scott and 2016 Olympic champion in the 100-metre freestyle, Australian Kyle Chalmers, and tied Kyle Chalmers for the silver medal, both finishing only behind Duncan Scott, with a personal best time of 48.15 seconds. On the fifth day, he won a third gold medal, this time winning the 100-metre butterfly with a new Games record time of 50.65 seconds, which was over six-tenths of a second faster than silver medalist in the event James Guy of England. On the sixth and final day of competition, he split a 50.10 for the butterfly leg of the 4×100-metre medley relay to help win the bronze medal in a time of 3:34.79.

=== 2018 Swimming World Cup ===
Following his success at the 2018 Swimming World Cup, Le Clos won the Guinness World Record for "most gold medals won in the FINA Swimming World Cup by a male swimmer" with 143 gold medals spanning his competing in Swimming World Cups starting in 2009 through the end of the 2018 Swimming World Cup.

=== 2018 Short Course World Championships ===
2018 World Short Course Championships
Gold medal – first place	100 m butterfly	48.50
Silver medal – second place	200 m butterfly	1:48.32 (AF)
Silver medal – second place	50 m butterfly	21.97
Bronze medal – third place	100 m freestyle	45.89

In the 100 metre butterfly at the 2018 World Short Course Championships in Hangzhou, China in December, Le Clos won the gold medal with a time of 48.50 seconds, finishing over two-tenths of a second ahead of silver medalist Caeleb Dressel of the United States and over seven-tenths of a second ahead of Li Zhuhao of China. Le Clos set a new African record in the 200 metre butterfly with a time of 1:48.32, which earned him the silver medal in the event. For the 50 metre butterfly, le Clos won the silver medal with a time of 21.97 seconds, finishing only behind the world record holder in the event Nicholas Santos of Brazil.

Two Russians flanked Le Clos in the final of the 100 metre freestyle, with Vladimir Morozov winning the silver medal, Le Clos winning the bronze medal, and Vladislav Grinev placing fourth, all within three-tenths of a second of each other. In the prelims heats of the 200 metre freestyle, Le Clos was 0.29 seconds off the 1:42.90 Blake Pieroni of the United States swum to achieve the eighth-fastest time and a spot in the final, instead ranking tenth with a 1:43.19 and not qualifying for the final. In the final of the 4×50 metre freestyle relay, Le Clos split a 20.31 for the second leg of the relay to help achieve a time of 1:24.14 and a fifth-place finish.

== 2019 ==
=== 2019 Long Course World Championships ===
Le Clos entered to compete in the 100 metre freestyle, 100 metre butterfly, and 200 metre butterfly, and chose not to swim in the 100 metre freestyle at the 2019 World Aquatics Championships in Gwangju, South Korea. He won the bronze medal in the 100 metre butterfly, finishing after gold medalist Caeleb Dressel of the United States and silver medalist Andrei Minakov of Russia, and the bronze medal in the 200 metre butterfly, finishing behind gold medalist Kristóf Milák of Hungary and silver medalist Daiya Seto of Japan.

=== 2019 International Swimming League ===
In the Autumn of 2019, he was a member of the inaugural International Swimming League competing for the Energy Standard Swim Club of which he was co-captain (with Sarah Sjöström). In December, the team won the overall title in Las Vegas, Nevada. Le Clos won the MVP title at the London stop on the inaugural tour amassing 44.5 points. He won the 100m / 200m Butterfly double three times over the season (Indianapolis, Naples and London), and in Indianapolis, he also won the 100m Freestyle. Over the season, he had the fourth most points (190.5) of any swimmer behind Emma Mckeon, Caeleb Dressel, and overall MVP (and teammate) Sarah Sjöström.

== 2021 ==
=== 2020 Summer Olympics ===
On 23 July 2021, Le Clos shared the honour of serving as a flag bearer for South Africa, alongside field hockey player Phumelela Mbande, at the Parade of Nations during the opening ceremony of the 2020 Summer Olympics in Tokyo, Japan. On the sixth day of the swimming competition, 29 July, he tied for 18th place in the preliminary heats of the 100-metre butterfly with a time of 51.89 seconds and did not advance to the next stage of the competition. Three days earlier, on the third day, he swam a 1:55.96 in the preliminary heats of the 200-metre butterfly, qualifying for the semifinals ranking 16th. In the semifinals the following day, day four, he qualified for the final ranking third with a time of 1:55.06. In the final of the 200-metre butterfly on day five, he placed fifth with a time of 1:54.93, finishing over three seconds behind the gold medalist in the event, Kristóf Milák of Hungary.

=== 2021 Short Course World Championships ===
2021 World Short Course Championships
Silver medal – second place	100 m butterfly	49.04
Bronze medal – third place	200 m butterfly	1:49.84

For the 2021 World Short Course Championships, held at Etihad Arena in Abu Dhabi, United Arab Emirates in December, Le Clos entered to compete in the individual events 100 metre freestyle, 200 metre freestyle, 50 metre butterfly, 100 metre butterfly, and 200 metre butterfly. When travel restrictions due to the COVID-19 pandemic prevented two of his teammates, Matthew Sates and Tatjana Schoenmaker, from attending and competing at the Championships, Le Clos was not impacted in the same way as he had already left South Africa for the 2021 International Swimming League.

On 16 December, day one of the championships, Le Clos ranked second in the prelims heats of the 200 metre butterfly with a 1:50.63, qualifying for the final later the same day. In the final of the event later the same day, Le Clos won the bronze medal with a time of 1:49.84, finishing less than eight-tenths of a second after gold medalist Alberto Razzetti of Italy and silver medalist Noè Ponti of Switzerland. For the 200 metre freestyle on day two, Le Clos decided not to swim the event. In the same prelims session, Le Clos qualified for the semifinals of the 100 metre butterfly with a 50.47 and ranked 11th overall. For the semifinals of the event, Le Clos qualified for the final ranked second, ahead of Youssef Ramadan of Egypt and behind Matteo Rivolta of Italy, with a 49.56. In the final of the 100 metre butterfly, Le Clos finished second to win the silver medal with a time of 49.04 seconds, less than two-tenths of a second behind gold medalist Matteo Rivolta and less than two-tenths of a second ahead of bronze medalist Andrei Minakov of Russia. Le Clos ranked 20th in the prelims heats of the 50 metre butterfly on day four with a time of 23.02 and did not qualify for the semifinals. On the fifth day of competition, Le Clos placed 23rd in the prelims heats of the 100 metre freestyle and did not qualify for the semifinals.

== 2022 ==
In early 2022, Le Clos announced he withdrew from the competition in the year's Midmar Mile due to missed training after contracting bronchitis. After recovering from bronchitis, Le Clos returned to competition, winning gold medals in the long course 100-metre freestyle in 49.41 seconds and the 50-metre butterfly with a time of 24.38 seconds at the 2022 Grand Prix Meet held in Durban in mid-February.

=== 2022 South Africa National Championships ===
On day one of the 2022 South Africa National Swimming Championships in Gqeberha, 6 April, he swam a 24.18 in the prelims heats of the 50-metre butterfly, qualifying for the final ranking first. He went on to win the final with a time of 23.93 seconds and helped achieve a win in the 4×100-metre mixed freestyle relay in 3:33.52. On the second day, he made a guest appearance, commentating during the live broadcast of the 400-metre individual medley, including talking about his goal for the Championships of qualifying for his fourth Commonwealth Games and his longer-term goal of becoming the most decorated Commonwealth Games competitor, a feat he would need one more medal to equal. In the 200-metre butterfly on day three, he achieved a gold medal and a 2022 Commonwealth Games and 2022 World Aquatics Championships qualifying time of 1:55.75. Later in the same session, he placed fifth in the 100-metre freestyle with a 50.86. He achieved a second qualifying time on the fourth day, winning the gold medal and national title in the 100-metre butterfly in 51.88 seconds and finishing less than two-tenths of a second ahead of silver medalist in the event, Matthew Sates. He was later also named to the 2022 World Championships team in the 50-metre butterfly. In June, he was officially named as part of the South Africa team to represent the country in swimming at the 2022 Commonwealth Games.

=== 2022 World Aquatics Championships ===
Starting on the first day of swimming competition at the 2022 World Aquatics Championships, Le Clos placed 33rd in the 50-metre butterfly preliminaries with a time of 23.86 seconds. After struggling with breathing issues towards the beginning of the Championships, he withdrew from the remaining competition.

=== 2022 Commonwealth Games ===
2022 Commonwealth Games
Silver medal – second place	200 m butterfly	1:55.89

Getting started at the 2022 Commonwealth Games, held in July and August in Birmingham, England, Le Clos achieved a spot in the semifinals of the 50-metre butterfly based on his overall eighth-rank and time of 23.80 seconds in the preliminaries of the event on day one of competition. He placed fifth in his semifinal heat and did not advance to the event's final. On day three of competition, he ranked second in the preliminaries of the 200-metre butterfly with a time of 1:56.85, which was less than one-tenth of a second behind first-ranked Lewis Clareburt of New Zealand and over half a second ahead of third-ranked Duncan Scott of Scotland, and qualified for the evening final. He won the silver medal in the final with a time of 1:55.89. The silver medal brought his total number of medals won at the Commonwealth Games to 18, including eight medals in individual butterfly events over his first four Commonwealth Games (2010 to 2022), which tied the record of 18 medals held by sport shooters Mick Gault of England and Phillips Adams of Australia for most decorated competitor at the Commonwealth Games across all sports.

The following morning, he swam a time of 52.65 seconds in the preliminaries of the 100-metre butterfly, qualifying for the semifinals ranking ninth. For the semifinals, he finished in a time of 51.64 seconds and ranked second across both semifinal heats behind Matthew Temple of Australia, qualifying for the final. He followed his semifinals performance up with a sixth-place finish in the final of the 4×200-metre freestyle relay, splitting a 1:47.47 for the second leg of the relay. In the final of the 100 metre butterfly the next day, he placed fourth with a time of 51.61 seconds. Had he won a medal in the event, he would have been the first person in history to achieve 19 medals at the Commonwealth Games over the course of their career. He followed his performance up with a time of 50.94 seconds for the butterfly portion of the 4×100-metre mixed medley relay in the final, helping drop over five full seconds from the former South African record in the event to set new African and national records and place fourth.

=== 2022 Swimming World Cup ===
On day one of the 2022 FINA Swimming World Cup stop held in Berlin, Germany, Le Clos won the gold medal in the 100-metre butterfly with a time of 48.58 seconds, which was one-tenth of a second slower than the World Cup record of 48.48 seconds set in 2009 by Yevgeny Korotyshkin of Russia. The following day, he won the gold medal in the 200-metre butterfly with a 1:49.62. On day three of three, he won the silver medal in the 50-metre butterfly with a time of 22.21 seconds, finishing 0.08 seconds behind gold medalist Dylan Carter of Trinidad and Tobago. For all of his events at the first stop of the World Cup circuit, he ranked as the fourth highest-scoring male competitor with 56.4 points. In the 100-metre butterfly at the next stop, in Toronto, Canada, he won the gold medal with a 48.88, which was 0.80 seconds ahead of silver medalist Matthew Temple and 0.87 seconds ahead of bronze medalist Trenton Julian of the United States. He finished behind Trenton Julian in the 200-metre butterfly the following day with a time of 1:49.78, winning the silver medal. On the third day, he won the silver medal in the 50-metre butterfly with a time of 22.45 seconds.

Le Clos went three-for-three in the 100-metre butterfly at the third and final stop, in Indianapolis, United States, winning the gold medal with a time of 48.85 seconds. The following day, he regained the golden crown in the 200-metre butterfly from Trenton Julian with a time of 1:49.89, winning the event 0.19 seconds faster than the American who won the gold medal ahead of him in Toronto. In his final event, the 50-metre butterfly, he won the silver medal with a time of 22.27 seconds. For his performances across the whole World Cup circuit, he ranked as the third overall highest-scoring male competitor with 166.3 points, which was 6.3 points behind male overall winner Dylan Carter.

=== 2022 Short Course World Championships ===
2022 World Championships (SC)
Gold medal – first place	200 m butterfly	1:48.27 (AF)
Gold medal – first place	100 m butterfly	48.59

Day two of six at the 2022 World Short Course Championships, 14 December in Melbourne, Australia, Le Clos placed fifth in the 50 metre butterfly with a time of 22.11 seconds. On The third day, he won the gold medal in the 200 metre butterfly with a personal best time of 1:48.27, which set new African, Commonwealth, and South African records in the event and was 0.95 seconds faster than silver medalist Daiya Seto. In the final of his third and final event, the 100 metre butterfly final on day six, he won the gold medal with a time of 48.59 seconds.

== 2023 ==
In April, at the 2023 South Africa National Championships in Gqeberha, Le Clos won the national title in the 200-metre butterfly in a 2023 World Aquatics Championships qualifying time of 1:56.05. The following day, he won the 100-metre freestyle national title with a time of 48.97 seconds, finishing 0.22 seconds ahead of silver medalist Pieter Coetze. He added a second World Championships qualifying time on day four, winning the gold medal and national title in the 100-metre butterfly with a time of 51.37 seconds in the final.

== 2026 ==
At the 2026 Commonwealth Games Le Clos became the most decorated Commonwealth male athlete ever, winning his 19th medal in the men's 4x100m freestyle relay. He went on to win his 20th and 21st medals, becoming the most decorated Commonwealth athlete ever.

== International championships (50 m) ==
Meet	100 free	200 free	50 fly	100 fly	200 fly	200 medley	400 medley	4×100 free	4×200 free	4×100 medley	4×100 mixed free	4×100 mixed medley
WC 2009					17th		16th				—N/a	—N/a
CG 2010				17th	1st place, gold medalist(s)	5th	1st place, gold medalist(s)	(bronze) ^{[a]}	3rd place, bronze medalist(s)	2nd place, silver medalist(s)	—N/a	—N/a
WC 2011				13th	5th					10th	—N/a	—N/a
AG 2011				2nd place, silver medalist(s)	1st place, gold medalist(s)	1st place, gold medalist(s)	1st place, gold medalist(s)	1st place, gold medalist(s)		1st place, gold medalist(s)	—N/a	—N/a
OG 2012			—N/a	2nd place, silver medalist(s)	1st place, gold medalist(s)	7th (sf)^{[b]}	5th		7th	13th	—N/a	—N/a
WC 2013			23rd	1st place, gold medalist(s)	1st place, gold medalist(s)			11th		11th	—N/a	—N/a
CG 2014			3rd place, bronze medalist(s)	1st place, gold medalist(s)	1st place, gold medalist(s)	3rd place, bronze medalist(s)		2nd place, silver medalist(s)	3rd place, bronze medalist(s)	3rd place, bronze medalist(s)	—N/a	—N/a
WC 2015		6th	14th	1st place, gold medalist(s)	2nd place, silver medalist(s)							
AG 2015			1st place, gold medalist(s)	1st place, gold medalist(s)					1st place, gold medalist(s)		1st place, gold medalist(s)	
OG 2016		2nd place, silver medalist(s)	—N/a	2nd place, silver medalist(s)	4th						—N/a	—N/a
WC 2017				12th	1st place, gold medalist(s)					15th		
CG 2018	2nd place, silver medalist(s)	7th	1st place, gold medalist(s)	1st place, gold medalist(s)	1st place, gold medalist(s)			6th		3rd place, bronze medalist(s)	—N/a	—N/a
WC 2019				3rd place, bronze medalist(s)	3rd place, bronze medalist(s)							
OG 2020			—N/a	18th	5th						—N/a	
WC 2022			33rd		DNS							
CG 2022			11th	4th	2nd place, silver medalist(s)				6th			4th
WC 2024	18th		16th	5th	DNS					16th		
OG 2024			—N/a	24th							—N/a	
CG 2026			11th	5th				3rd place, bronze medalist(s)		3rd place, bronze medalist(s)		2nd place, silver medalist(s)

^{a} Le Clos swam only in the prelims heats.
^{b} Le Clos withdrew after qualifying for the final.

== International championships (25 m) ==
Meet	100 free	200 free	50 fly	100 fly	200 fly	200 medley	400 medley	4×50 free	4×200 free	4×50 medley
WC 2010		16th			1st place, gold medalist(s)	12th	5th	—N/a		—N/a
WC 2012			2nd place, silver medalist(s)	1st place, gold medalist(s)				—N/a		—N/a
WC 2014		1st place, gold medalist(s)	1st place, gold medalist(s)	1st place, gold medalist(s)	1st place, gold medalist(s)				3rd place, bronze medalist(s)	8th^{[a]}
WC 2016	30th	2nd place, silver medalist(s)	1st place, gold medalist(s)	1st place, gold medalist(s)	1st place, gold medalist(s)			6th		
WC 2018	3rd place, bronze medalist(s)	10th	2nd place, silver medalist(s)	1st place, gold medalist(s)	2nd place, silver medalist(s)			5th		
WC 2021	23rd	DNS	20th	2nd place, silver medalist(s)	3rd place, bronze medalist(s)					
WC 2022			5th	1st place, gold medalist(s)	1st place, gold medalist(s)					

^{a} Le Clos swam only in the prelims heats.

== Personal best times ==
=== Long course (50-metre pool) ===
Event	Time	Meet	Location	Date	Notes	Ref
100 m freestyle	48.15	2018 Commonwealth Games	Gold Coast, Australia	8 April 2018		
200 m freestyle	1:45.20	2016 Summer Olympics	Rio de Janeiro, Brazil	8 August 2016	AF, NR	
50 m butterfly	23.23	2015 Swimming World Cup	Chartres, France	15 August 2015		
100 m butterfly	50.56	2015 World Aquatics Championships	Kazan, Russia	8 August 2015	AF, NR	
200 m butterfly	1:52.96	2012 Summer Olympics	London, England	31 July 2012	AF, CR, NR	
200 m individual medley	1:57.94	2014 South Africa National Championships	Johannesburg	7 April 2014		
400 m individual medley	4:12.24	2012 Summer Olympics	London, England	28 July 2012		

Legend: AF – African record; CR – Commonwealth record; NR – South African record; e – equalled existing record;
Records not set in finals: h – heat; sf – semifinal; r – relay 1st leg; rh – relay heat 1st leg; b – B final; † – en route to final mark; so – swim-off; tt – time trial

=== Short course (25-metre pool) ===
Event	Time	Meet	Location	Date	Notes	Ref
50 m freestyle	21.05	2016 Swimming World Cup	Moscow, Russia	4 September 2016		
100 m freestyle	45.78	2017 Swimming World Cup	Berlin, Germany	6 August 2017	AF, NR	
200 m freestyle	1:41.45	2014 Short Course World Championships	Doha, Qatar	3 December 2014		
50 m butterfly	21.95	2014 Short Course World Championships	Doha, Qatar	6 December 2014		
100 m butterfly	48.08	2016 Short Course World Championships	Windsor, Canada	8 December 2016	AF, CR, NR, Former WR	
200 m butterfly	1:48.27	2022 Short Course World Championships	Melbourne, Australia	15 December 2022	AF, CR, NR	
200 m individual medley	1:51:56	2014 Swimming World Cup	Dubai, United Arab Emirates	1 September 2014		
400 m individual medley	3:59.23	2013 Swimming World Cup	Tokyo, Japan	9 November 2013		

Legend: WR – World record; AF – African record; CR – Commonwealth record; NR – South African record; e – equalled existing record;
Records not set in finals: h – heat; sf – semifinal; r – relay 1st leg; rh – relay heat 1st leg; b – B final; † – en route to final mark; so – swim-off; tt – time trial

== Swimming World Cup circuits ==
The following medals Le Clos has won at Swimming World Cup circuits.

Edition	Gold medals	Silver medals	Bronze medals	Total
2009	3	3	3	9
2011	23	10	2	35
2012	3	2	1	6
2013	24	8	3	35
2014	27	0	0	27
2015	11	4	0	15
2016	25	8	4	37
2017	22	9	1	32
2018	5	6	0	11
2019	2	0	0	2
2021	1	1	2	4
2022	5	4	0	9
2024	1	2	1	4
Total	152	57	17	226

== Guinness world records ==
- "Most gold medals won in the FINA Swimming World Cup (male)", 2018: 143 gold medals from 2009 to 2018.

== World records ==
=== Short course (25-metre pool) ===
No.	Event	Time	Meet	Location	Date	Status	Notes	Ref
1	200 m butterfly	1:49.04	2013 Swimming World Cup	Eindhoven, Netherlands	7 August 2013	Former	Former AF, CR, NR	
2	200 m butterfly (2)	1:48.56	2013 Swimming World Cup	Singapore, Singapore	5 November 2013	Former	Former AF, CR, NR	
3	100 m butterfly	48.44	2014 World Short Course Championships	Doha, Qatar	4 December 2014	Former	Former AF, CR, NR	
4	100 m butterfly (2)	48.08	2016 World Short Course Championships	Windsor, Canada	8 December 2016	Former	AF, CR, NR	

Legend: AF – African record; CR – Commonwealth record; NR – South African record

== Awards and honours ==
- FINA, Top 10 Moments: 2021 Swimming World Cup (#3)
- FINA, Athlete of the Year, Swimming (male): 2014, 2018
- SwimSwam Swammy Award, Male Swimmer of the Year: 2013, 2014, 2018
- He was conferred the silver Order of Ikhamanga on 27 April 2013. In a statement by the Chairperson of the National Orders Advisory Council, Dr. Cassius Lubisi, le Clos was conferred the honour "For his excellent achievements on the international swimming stage, especially at the London Olympics in 2012, thus placing South Africa in high standing globally in the field of Aquatic sports."
- He was also announced as the KZN Newsmaker of the Year 2013 at the Durban City Hall on 9 October 2013. The event was hosted by the Durban University of Technology, the City of Durban, and the DUT Journalism Advisory Board. Radio personality Alan Khan was the programme director. Le Clos was not present to receive his award as he was swimming in Moscow. His father, Bert le Clos, received the honour on le Clos's behalf.
- Le Clos won the Daily News SPAR Sports Person of the Year in 2010, in which the top school sportsmen were nominated.

== See also ==
- World record progression 100 metres butterfly
- World record progression 200 metres butterfly
- List of Commonwealth Games medallists in swimming (men)
- List of Olympic medalists in swimming (men)
- List of Youth Olympic Games gold medalists who won Olympic gold medals
- List of World Swimming Championships (25 m) medalists (men)
- List of Commonwealth Games records in swimming
- List of African records in swimming

Records
Preceded by (Russia) Yevgeny Korotyshkin	Men's 100-metre butterfly world record-holder (short course); 4 December 2014 – 21 November 2020	Succeeded by (United States) Caeleb Dressel
Preceded by (Brazil) Kaio de Almeida	Men's 200-metre butterfly world record-holder (short course); 7 August 2013 – 11 December 2018	Succeeded by (Japan) Daiya Seto
Sporting positions
Preceded by Thiago Pereira; Kenneth To; Vladimir Morozov	Male World Cup Overall Winner; 2011; 2013, 2014; 2017	Succeeded by Kenneth To; Cameron van der Burgh; Vladimir Morozov
Awards
Preceded by Cameron van der Burgh	African Swimmer of the Year; 2012–2019	Succeeded by Ahmed Hafnaoui
Preceded by Ryan Lochte; Caeleb Dressel	FINA Swimmer of the Year; 2014; 2018	Succeeded by Mitch Larkin; Caeleb Dressel
Olympic Games
Preceded by Connor Wilson	Flagbearer for South Africa; Tokyo 2020 with Phumelela Mbande	Succeeded by Caitlin Rooskrantz; Akani Simbine
