= 2021 FINA World Swimming Championships (25 m) – Men's 200 metre butterfly =

Swimming competition

Men's 200 metre butterfly at the 2021 FINA World Swimming Championships (25 m)
- Venue: Etihad Arena
- Location: Abu Dhabi, United Arab Emirates
- Dates: 16 December (heats and final)
- Competitors: 42 from 40 nations
- Winning time: 1:49.06

Medalists
gold medal	Alberto Razzetti	Italy
silver medal	Noè Ponti	Switzerland
bronze medal	Chad le Clos	South Africa

The Men's 200 metre butterfly competition of the 2021 FINA World Swimming Championships (25 m) was held on 16 December 2021.

== Records ==
Prior to the competition, the existing world and championship records were as follows.

World record	Daiya Seto (JPN)	1:48.24	Hangzhou, China	11 December 2018
Competition record	Daiya Seto (JPN)	1:48.24	Hangzhou, China	11 December 2018

== Results ==
=== Heats ===
The heats were started at 10:24.

Rank	Heat	Lane	Name	Nationality	Time	Notes
1	3	7	Trenton Julian	United States	1:50.32	Q
2	5	4	Chad le Clos	South Africa	1:50.63	Q
3	3	2	Noè Ponti	Switzerland	1:50.82	Q, NR
4	5	6	Kregor Zirk	Estonia	1:50.92	Q, NR
5	4	4	Alberto Razzetti	Italy	1:51.33	Q
6	3	6	Antani Ivanov	Bulgaria	1:51.49	Q, NR
7	3	3	José Martínez	Mexico	1:51.58	Q
8	3	4	Tomoe Hvas	Norway	1:51.83	Q
9	4	6	Krzysztof Chmielewski	Poland	1:51.84	
10	3	1	Sajan Prakash	India	1:52.10	NR
11	4	5	Zach Harting	United States	1:52.40	
12	3	5	Aleksandr Kharlanov	Russian Swimming Federation	1:52.67	
13	5	2	Louis Croenen	Belgium	1:52.84	NR
14	5	3	Aleksandr Kudashev	Russian Swimming Federation	1:52.86	
15	4	2	Sebastian Luňák	Czech Republic	1:53.28	
16	5	5	Ramon Klenz	Germany	1:53.61	
17	4	3	Leonardo de Deus	Brazil	1:53.94	
18	4	8	Adilbek Mussin	Kazakhstan	1:54.40	NR
19	4	7	Edward Mildred	Great Britain	1:55.51	
20	5	7	Denys Kesil	Ukraine	1:55.70	
21	4	1	Moon Seung-woo	South Korea	1:55.77	
22	3	8	Navaphat Wongcharoen	Thailand	1:56.55	NR
23	5	0	Richard Nagy	Slovakia	1:56.93	NR
24	4	0	Luis Vega Torres	Cuba	1:57.89	
25	2	5	Jorge Otaiza	Venezuela	1:58.02	NR
26	2	6	Carlos Vásquez	Honduras	1:58.41	NR
27	5	1	Efe Turan	Turkey	1:58.62	
28	2	4	Hồ Nguyễn Duy Khoa	Vietnam	1:58.82	
29	4	9	Matin Balsini	Iran	1:58.83	NR
30	3	0	Ramil Valizade	Azerbaijan	1:59.74	
31	3	9	Keanan Dols	Jamaica	2:00.52	
32	1	5	Mathew Bennici	Cambodia	2:00.95	NR
33	2	3	Ho Tin Long	Hong Kong	2:01.43	
34	2	7	Salvador Gordo	Angola	2:03.30	
35	2	2	Simon Bachmann	Seychelles	2:04.29	
36	2	1	Davor Petrovski	North Macedonia	2:04.55	
37	1	2	Ghalib Sabt	United Arab Emirates	2:06.57	
38	1	3	Johnpaul Balloqui	Gibraltar	2:08.07	NR
39	2	8	Alush Telaku	Kosovo	2:09.62	
40	2	9	Gerald Hernández	Nicaragua	2:10.29	
41	1	4	Mashari Al-Samhan	Kuwait	2:11.87	
42	1	6	Siraj Al Sharif	Libya	2:21.43	
	2	0	Philip Adejumo	Nigeria	DNS	
	5	8	Ong Jung Yi	Singapore	DNS	
	5	9	Jaouad Syoud	Algeria	DNS	

=== Final ===
The final was held at 18:42.

Rank	Lane	Name	Nationality	Time	Notes
1st place, gold medalist(s)	2	Alberto Razzetti	Italy	1:49.06	NR
2nd place, silver medalist(s)	3	Noè Ponti	Switzerland	1:49.81	NR
3rd place, bronze medalist(s)	5	Chad le Clos	South Africa	1:49.84	
4	4	Trenton Julian	United States	1:50.01	
5	6	Kregor Zirk	Estonia	1:50.68	NR
6	7	Antani Ivanov	Bulgaria	1:51.62	
7	1	José Martínez	Mexico	1:52.00	
8	8	Tomoe Hvas	Norway	1:53.06	
