= Swimming at the 2014 South American Games – Men's 200 metre backstroke =

Men's 200 metre backstroke at the 2014 South American Games
- Venue: Estadio Nacional
- Dates: March 7, 2014 (heats & finals)
- Competitors: 10 from 8 nations
- Winning time: 2:00.28

Medalists
gold medal	Leonardo de Deus	Brazil
silver medal	Matías López Chaparro	Paraguay
bronze medal	David Céspedes	Colombia

The men's 200 metre backstroke competition at the 2014 South American Games took place on March 7 at the Estadio Nacional. The last champion was Leonardo de Deus of Brazil.

This race consisted of four lengths of the pool, all in backstroke.

== Records ==
Prior to this competition, the existing world and Pan Pacific records were as follows:

World record	Aaron Peirsol (USA)	1:51.92	Rome, Italy	July 31, 2009
South American Games record	Leonardo de Deus (BRA)	2:02.00	Medellín, Colombia	March 26, 2010

== Results ==
All times are in minutes and seconds.

KEY:	q	Fastest non-qualifiers	Q	Qualified	CR	Championships record	NR	National record	PB	Personal best	SB	Seasonal best

=== Heats ===
The first round was held on March 7, at 11:56.

Rank	Heat	Lane	Name	Nationality	Time	Notes
1	2	4	Leonardo de Deus	Brazil	2:05.75	Q
2	1	5	David Céspedes	Colombia	2:07.20	Q
3	1	4	Matías López Chaparro	Paraguay	2:07.70	Q
3	2	3	Agustín Hernandez	Argentina	2:07.70	Q
5	2	5	Benjamin Hockin	Paraguay	2:08.33	Q
6	1	6	Eduardo Opazo Rojas	Chile	2:10.90	Q
7	2	2	Benjamin Quintanilla Arias	Chile	2:11.13	Q
8	2	6	Carlos Polit Carvajal	Ecuador	2:11.40	Q
9	1	3	Jesus Daniel Lopez	Venezuela	2:11.55	
10	1	2	Jose Alberto Moreno	Bolivia	2:18.92	

=== Final ===
The final was held on March 7, at 20:34.

Rank	Lane	Name	Nationality	Time	Notes
1st place, gold medalist(s)	4	Leonardo de Deus	Brazil	2:00.28	CR
2nd place, silver medalist(s)	6	Matías López Chaparro	Paraguay	2:02.43	NR
3rd place, bronze medalist(s)	5	David Céspedes	Colombia	2:04.12	
4	3	Agustín Hernandez	Argentina	2:05.48	
5	2	Benjamin Hockin	Paraguay	2:06.22	
6	7	Eduardo Opazo Rojas	Chile	2:10.10	
7	1	Benjamin Quintanilla Arias	Chile	2:11.02	
8	8	Carlos Polit Carvajal	Ecuador	2:12.00	
