= 2016 FINA World Swimming Championships (25 m) – Men's 200 metre butterfly =

Men's 200 metre butterfly at the 2016 FINA World Swimming Championships (25 m)
- Venue: WFCU Centre
- Dates: 6 December (heats and final)
- Competitors: 50 from 39 nations
- Winning time: 1:48.76

Medalists
gold medal	Chad le Clos	South Africa
silver medal	Tom Shields	United States
bronze medal	Daiya Seto	Japan

The Men's 200 metre butterfly competition of the 2016 FINA World Swimming Championships (25 m) was held on 6 December 2016.

== Records ==
Prior to the competition, the existing world and championship records were as follows.

	Name	Nation	Time	Location	Date
World record	Chad le Clos	South Africa	1:48.56	Singapore	5 November 2013
Championship record	Chad le Clos	South Africa	1:48.61	Doha	7 December 2014

== Results ==
=== Heats ===
The heats were held at 10:49.

Rank	Heat	Lane	Name	Nationality	Time	Notes
1	6	5	Aleksandr Kharlanov	Russia	1:51.03	Q
2	5	4	Chad le Clos	South Africa	1:51.23	Q
3	5	6	Pace Clark	United States	1:51.68	Q
4	5	5	Viktor Bromer	Denmark	1:51.87	Q
5	4	4	Daiya Seto	Japan	1:52.44	Q
6	5	3	Leonardo de Deus	Brazil	1:52.89	Q
7	4	3	Nao Horomura	Japan	1:53.05	Q
8	6	4	Tom Shields	United States	1:53.09	Q
9	4	2	Tamás Kenderesi	Hungary	1:53.32	
10	6	7	Dávid Verrasztó	Hungary	1:53.42	
11	4	5	David Morgan	Australia	1:53.54	
12	6	3	Nikolay Skvortsov	Russia	1:53.67	
13	6	2	Giacomo Carini	Italy	1:53.92	
14	5	2	Jonathan Gómez	Colombia	1:54.09	NR
15	4	6	Antani Ivanov	Bulgaria	1:54.80	NR
16	6	6	Louis Croenen	Belgium	1:54.84	
17	5	0	Marius Kusch	Germany	1:55.24	
18	6	0	Mackenzie Darragh	Canada	1:55.45	
19	5	7	Pavel Janeček	Czech Republic	1:55.50	
20	4	7	Tomáš Havránek	Czech Republic	1:55.57	
21	5	1	Joan Lluís Pons	Spain	1:56.08	
22	6	1	Jesper Björk	Sweden	1:56.19	
23	6	8	Miguel Nascimento	Portugal	1:56.28	
24	5	8	Yu Yingbiao	China	1:56.68	
25	5	9	Sajan Prakash	India	1:56.73	NR
26	4	8	Deividas Margevičius	Lithuania	1:57.31	
27	3	3	Chou Wei-Liang	Chinese Taipei	1:57.53	
28	4	1	Wu Yuhang	China	1:57.68	
29	4	0	Eben Vorster	South Africa	1:58.62	
30	3	7	Tsai Yi-Lin	Chinese Taipei	1:59.28	
31	4	9	Nicolaas Dekker	Canada	1:59.67	
32	3	5	Lazaro Vergara Martin	Cuba	2:00.43	NR
33	2	1	Said Saber	Morocco	2:01.25	
34	3	8	Akaki Vashakidze	Georgia	2:01.72	
35	3	6	Jean Pierre Monteagudo	Peru	2:01.83	
36	6	9	Navaphat Wongcharoen	Thailand	2:01.87	NR
37	3	2	Pedro Pinotes	Angola	2:01.91	NR
38	3	0	Bryan Alvarez	Costa Rica	2:02.74	NR
39	2	7	Russell Brown	Costa Rica	2:04.68	
40	2	2	Brandon Vives	Dominican Republic	2:05.13	
41	3	9	Joaquin Sepulveda Parra	Chile	2:05.71	
42	2	3	Amir Amrollahi Biuoki	Iran	2:06.30	NR
43	2	4	Dylan Koo	Singapore	2:06.38	
44	1	4	Jeremy Lim	Philippines	2:06.83	
45	3	4	Lâm Quang Nhật	Vietnam	2:08.45	
46	2	5	Nuno Rola	Angola	2:09.64	
47	2	8	Matt Savitz	Gibraltar	2:09.65	NR
48	2	6	Mathieu Marquet	Mauritius	2:10.58	
49	1	5	Carlos Vasquez	Honduras	2:14.46	
50	1	3	Abdulmajid Kadernani	Kenya	2:19.17	
	3	1	Ayman Kelzi	Syria		DNS

=== Final ===
The final was held at 19:10.

Rank	Lane	Name	Nationality	Time	Notes
1st place, gold medalist(s)	5	Chad le Clos	South Africa	1:48.76	
2nd place, silver medalist(s)	8	Tom Shields	United States	1:49.50	
3rd place, bronze medalist(s)	2	Daiya Seto	Japan	1:49.97	
4	4	Aleksandr Kharlanov	Russia	1:51.41	
5	7	Leonardo de Deus	Brazil	1:52.65	
6	6	Viktor Bromer	Denmark	1:52.68	
7	3	Pace Clark	United States	1:53.15	
8	1	Nao Horomura	Japan	1:53.64	
