= 2014 FINA World Swimming Championships (25 m) – Men's 200 metre butterfly =

Men's 200 metre butterfly at the 2014 FINA World Swimming Championships (25 m)
- Dates: 7 December
- Competitors: 52 from 39 nations
- Winning time: 1:48.61

Medalists
gold medal	Chad le Clos	South Africa
silver medal	Daiya Seto	Japan
bronze medal	Paweł Korzeniowski	Poland

The Men's 200 metre butterfly competition of the 2014 FINA World Swimming Championships (25 m) was held on 7 December.

== Records ==
Prior to the competition, the existing world and championship records were as follows.

	Name	Nation	Time	Location	Date
World record	Chad le Clos	South Africa	1:48.56	Singapore	5 November 2013
Championship record	Kazuya Kaneda	Japan	1:51.01	Istanbul	16 December 2012

The following records were established during the competition:

Date	Event	Name	Nation	Time	Record
7 December	Heats	Daiya Seto	Japan	1:50.82	CR
7 December	Final	Chad le Clos	South Africa	1:48.61	CR

== Results ==
=== Heats ===
The heats were held at 10:26.

Rank	Heat	Lane	Name	Nationality	Time	Notes
1	6	4	Daiya Seto	Japan	1:50.82	Q, CR
2	6	5	Paweł Korzeniowski	Poland	1:51.24	Q
3	5	4	Chad le Clos	South Africa	1:51.37	Q
4	5	3	Viktor Bromer	Denmark	1:51.81	Q
5	6	6	Grant Irvine	Australia	1:52.12	Q
6	4	4	Tom Shields	United States	1:52.64	Q
7	6	3	Aleksandr Kudashev	Russia	1:52.66	Q
8	4	5	Nikolay Skvortsov	Russia	1:52.67	Q
9	4	7	Sebastien Rousseau	South Africa	1:52.97	
10	5	2	Lucas Salatta	Brazil	1:53.08	
11	4	8	Louis Croenen	Belgium	1:53.13	
12	4	6	Bence Biczó	Hungary	1:53.17	
13	6	2	Tyler Clary	United States	1:53.39	
14	4	2	Markus Gierke	Germany	1:53.72	
15	5	6	Michał Poprawa	Poland	1:53.89	
16	5	8	Diogo Carvalho	Portugal	1:54.43	
17	6	0	Jan Šefl	Czech Republic	1:54.45	
18	5	7	Dávid Verrasztó	Hungary	1:54.55	
18	5	0	Robert Žbogar	Slovenia	1:54.55	
20	4	0	Andreas Vazaios	Greece	1:54.58	
21	5	5	Velimir Stjepanović	Serbia	1:54.63	
22	4	1	David Morgan	Australia	1:54.72	
23	5	1	Alexander Kunert	Germany	1:54.92	
24	6	7	Wang Pudong	China	1:54.99	
25	3	3	Alexandru Coci	Romania	1:55.41	
26	6	1	Matteo Pelizzari	Italy	1:55.97	
27	5	9	Andres Montoya	Colombia	1:56.12	
28	4	9	Pavel Janeček	Czech Republic	1:56.27	
29	6	9	Sindri Jakobsson	Norway	1:56.82	
30	6	8	Gal Nevo	Israel	1:57.11	
31	1	6	Guy Barnea	Israel	1:58.06	
32	3	9	Gabriel Ogawa	Brazil	1:58.57	
33	3	4	Xiao Lei	China	1:58.77	
34	3	6	Teimuraz Kobakhidze	Georgia	1:59.46	
35	3	5	Max Abreu	Paraguay	1:59.65	
36	3	8	Jessie Lacuna	Philippines	1:59.89	
37	2	0	Ngọc Huỳnh Nguyễn	Vietnam	2:00.46	
38	3	7	Marko Blaževski	Macedonia	2:00.61	
39	2	5	Ensar Hajder	Bosnia and Herzegovina	2:01.42	
40	3	2	Joaquin Sepulveda	Chile	2:02.10	
41	3	0	Daniel Pálsson	Iceland	2:02.94	
42	3	1	Jean Monteagudo	Peru	2:03.48	
43	2	7	Aldo Castillo	Bolivia	2:05.47	
44	2	2	Matthew Courtis	Barbados	2:05.91	
45	2	6	Jeremy Lim	Philippines	2:06.87	
46	2	4	Ali Ashkanani	Kuwait	2:08.23	
47	2	1	Arian Oliaei	Iran	2:08.75	
48	2	3	Said Saber	Morocco	2:08.79	
49	2	8	Franci Aleksi	Albania	2:12.90	
50	1	3	Miguel Mena	Nicaragua	2:17.81	
51	1	5	Binald Mahmuti	Albania	2:18.41	
52	2	9	Yacop Al-Khulaifi	Qatar	2:19.22	
—	1	4	Noah Mascoll-Gomes	Antigua and Barbuda		DNS
—	4	3	Masato Sakai	Japan		DSQ

=== Final ===
The final was held at 18:28.

Rank	Lane	Name	Nationality	Time	Notes
1st place, gold medalist(s)	3	Chad le Clos	South Africa	1:48.61	CR
2nd place, silver medalist(s)	4	Daiya Seto	Japan	1:48.92	AS
3rd place, bronze medalist(s)	5	Paweł Korzeniowski	Poland	1:50.21	
4	7	Tom Shields	United States	1:50.68	
5	6	Viktor Bromer	Denmark	1:52.13	
6	1	Aleksandr Kudashev	Russia	1:52.17	
7	8	Nikolay Skvortsov	Russia	1:52.52	
8	2	Grant Irvine	Australia	1:52.69	
