= Swimming at the 2010 Commonwealth Games – Men's 400 metre individual medley =

The Men's 400 metre individual medley event at the 2010 Commonwealth Games took place on 7 October 2010, at the SPM Swimming Pool Complex.

Two heats were held. The heat in which a swimmer competed did not formally matter for advancement, as the swimmers with the top eight times from the entire field qualified for the finals.

== Heats ==
=== Heat 1 ===
Rank	Lane	Name	Nationality	Time	Notes
1	4	Riaan Schoeman	South Africa	4:18.46	Q
2	5	Joseph Roebuck	England	4:18.56	Q
2	6	Lewis Smith	Scotland	4:18.56	Q
4	3	Thomas Haffield	Wales	4:20.12	Q
5	2	Robert Ford	Canada	4:23.87	
6	7	Thomas Hollingsworth	Guernsey	4:39.63	
–	1	Colin Bensadon	Gibraltar		DSQ

=== Heat 2 ===
Rank	Lane	Name	Nationality	Time	Notes
1	6	Chad le Clos	South Africa	4:21.87	Q
2	4	Roberto Pavoni	England	4:22.06	Q
3	3	Thomas Fraser-Holmes	Australia	4:22.39	Q
4	5	Brian Johns	Canada	4:23.64	Q
5	2	Jayden Hadler	Australia	4:27.73	
6	7	Ian Black	Jersey	4:34.29	
7	1	Rehan Poncha	India	4:44.95	
8	1	Merwyn Chen	India	4:51.33	

== Final ==
Rank	Lane	Name	Nationality	Time	Notes
1st place, gold medalist(s)	2	Chad le Clos	South Africa	4:13.25	CGR
2nd place, silver medalist(s)	5	Joseph Roebuck	England	4:15.84	
3rd place, bronze medalist(s)	4	Riaan Schoeman	South Africa	4:16.86	
4	6	Thomas Haffield	Wales	4:17.47	
5	1	Thomas Fraser-Holmes	Australia	4:17.99	
6	8	Brian Johns	Canada	4:19.77	
7	7	Roberto Pavoni	England	4:19.81	
8	3	Lewis Smith	Scotland	4:21.64	
