= 2014 FINA World Swimming Championships (25 m) – Men's 200 metre freestyle =

Men's 200 metre freestyle at the 2014 FINA World Swimming Championships (25 m)
- Dates: 3 December
- Competitors: 100 from 75 nations
- Winning time: 1:41.45

Medalists
gold medal	Chad le Clos	South Africa
silver medal	Danila Izotov	Russia
bronze medal	Ryan Lochte	United States

The men's 200 metre freestyle competition of the 2014 FINA World Swimming Championships (25 m) was held on 3 December.

== Records ==
Prior to the competition, the existing world and championship records were as follows.

	Name	Nation	Time	Location	Date
World record	Paul Biedermann	Germany	1:39.37	Berlin	15 November 2009
Championship record	Ryan Lochte	United States	1:41.08	Dubai	15 December 2010

== Results ==
=== Heats ===
The heats were held at 09:30.

Rank	Heat	Lane	Name	Nationality	Time	Notes
1	10	3	Dominik Kozma	Hungary	1:42.35	Q
2	6	5	Cristian Quintero	Venezuela	1:42.40	Q
3	10	4	Danila Izotov	Russia	1:42.45	Q
4	10	5	Velimir Stjepanović	Serbia	1:42.66	Q
5	10	6	Daniel Smith	Australia	1:42.67	Q
6	9	2	Chad le Clos	South Africa	1:42.84	Q
7	8	2	Péter Bernek	Hungary	1:42.85	Q
8	7	5	Ryan Lochte	United States	1:42.97	Q
9	9	3	Filippo Magnini	Italy	1:43.01	
10	10	8	James Guy	Great Britain	1:43.28	
11	8	1	Andrea Mitchell D'Arrigo	Italy	1:43.31	
12	9	9	Pieter Timmers	Belgium	1:43.35	
13	9	5	Cameron McEvoy	Australia	1:43.37	
14	9	4	Conor Dwyer	United States	1:43.38	
15	9	6	Mikhail Polischuk	Russia	1:43.48	
16	8	3	Adam Barrett	Great Britain	1:43.51	
17	8	6	Myles Brown	South Africa	1:43.65	
18	10	2	Clément Mignon	France	1:43.79	
19	8	5	João de Lucca	Brazil	1:44.00	
20	9	7	Clemens Rapp	Germany	1:44.22	
21	8	4	Oussama Mellouli	Tunisia	1:44.24	
22	10	7	Ben Hockin	Paraguay	1:44.36	
23	10	1	Glenn Surgeloose	Belgium	1:44.41	
24	8	8	Anders Lie	Denmark	1:44.79	
25	8	7	Yuki Kobori	Japan	1:45.08	
26	7	6	Reo Sakata	Japan	1:45.14	
27	10	0	Alexandre Haldemann	Switzerland	1:45.55	
28	10	9	David Brandl	Austria	1:45.76	
29	9	8	Gustavo Godoy	Brazil	1:46.05	
30	7	9	Felix Auböck	Austria	1:46.29	
31	7	7	Henrik Christiansen	Norway	1:46.58	
32	9	1	Lin Yongqing	China	1:46.59	
33	8	9	Frederik Siem Pedersen	Denmark	1:46.64	
34	6	0	Jérémy Desplanches	Switzerland	1:47.03	
35	9	0	Federico Grabich	Argentina	1:47.23	
36	7	8	Pavel Janeček	Czech Republic	1:47.24	
37	7	2	David Kunčar	Czech Republic	1:47.47	
37	7	1	Martin Bau	Slovenia	1:47.47	
39	7	3	Povilas Strazdas	Lithuania	1:47.63	
40	8	0	Ahmed Mathlouthi	Tunisia	1:48.25	
41	7	4	Filip Zaborowski	Poland	1:48.33	
42	7	0	Nezır Karap	Turkey	1:48.37	
43	6	4	Irakli Revishvili	Georgia	1:49.20	
44	5	5	Khurshidjon Tursunov	Uzbekistan	1:49.40	
45	6	3	Andrés Olvera	Mexico	1:49.57	
46	5	8	Pedro Pinotes	Angola	1:49.60	
47	4	1	Nico Campbell	Jamaica	1:49.63	
48	4	2	Marko Blaževski	Macedonia	1:49.80	
49	1	9	Alpkan Örnek	Turkey	1:49.82	
50	6	1	Wang Yu-lian	Chinese Taipei	1:49.86	
51	6	2	Marcelo Acosta	El Salvador	1:49.93	
52	6	7	Julien Henx	Luxembourg	1:49.97	
53	6	6	Kristofer Sigurðsson	Iceland	1:50.04	
54	5	1	Henri Reinsalu	Estonia	1:50.36	
55	4	5	Esteban Enderica	Ecuador	1:50.46	
56	5	2	Matías Pinto	Chile	1:50.47	
57	6	8	Jessie Lacuna	Philippines	1:50.64	
58	6	9	Badis Djendouci	Algeria	1:50.65	
59	5	6	Sven Saemundsson	Croatia	1:50.94	
60	4	3	Oli Mortensen	Faroe Islands	1:51.65	
61	5	4	Khader Baqlah	Jordan	1:51.78	
62	5	3	Stanislav Karnaukhov	Kyrgyzstan	1:51.80	
63	4	4	Mikel Schreuders	Aruba	1:51.96	
64	5	9	Mathieu Marquet	Mauritius	1:52.93	
65	3	4	Patrick Groters	Aruba	1:53.00	
66	4	0	Isaac Beitia	Panama	1:53.16	
67	4	6	Jethro Chua	Philippines	1:53.19	
68	5	7	Sooud Al-Tayyar	Kuwait	1:53.37	
69	3	5	Jevon Atkinson	Jamaica	1:53.60	
70	3	8	Winter Heaven	Samoa	1:53.71	
71	4	8	Mark Burnley	Curaçao	1:54.07	
72	4	7	Jesús Monge	Peru	1:54.16	
73	3	7	Noah Mascoll-Gomes	Antigua and Barbuda	1:54.93	
74	3	3	Geoffrey Butler	Cayman Islands	1:55.57	
75	2	3	Aldo Castillo	Bolivia	1:55.72	
76	2	4	Mahmoud Daaboul	Lebanon	1:56.27	
77	4	9	Alex Sobers	Barbados	1:56.55	
78	3	6	Klavio Meça	Albania	1:57.18	
79	3	0	Miguel Mena	Nicaragua	1:59.45	
80	5	0	Abdalla Al-Bader	Kuwait	1:59.65	
81	3	2	Farhan Saleh	Bahrain	2:00.01	
82	2	5	Brandon Schuster	Samoa	2:00.09	
83	2	0	González Leonardo	Honduras	2:00.24	
84	2	7	Zandanbal Gunsennorov	Mongolia	2:00.38	
85	3	9	Franci Aleksi	Albania	2:01.15	
86	2	6	Karl Pardo	Gibraltar	2:02.09	
87	3	1	Guillermo López	Nicaragua	2:03.19	
88	2	2	Yacop Al-Khulaifi	Qatar	2:04.29	
89	1	3	Kitso Matija	Botswana	2:04.96	
90	2	9	Dean Hoffman	Seychelles	2:05.09	
91	1	5	Syed Javaid	Pakistan	2:05.22	
92	1	7	Sirish Gurung	Nepal	2:06.35	
93	2	1	Tommy Imazu	Guam	2:07.35	
94	1	1	Bobby Akunaii	Papua New Guinea	2:07.46	
95	1	6	Tanner Poppe	Guam	2:09.55	
96	1	8	Livingston Aika	Papua New Guinea	2:09.76	
97	2	8	Tongli Panuve	Tonga	2:10.68	
98	1	4	Omar Adams	Guyana	2:12.56	
99	1	0	Shawn Dingilius	Palau	2:12.62	
100	1	2	Mamadou Soumaré	Mali	2:13.26	

=== Final ===
The final was held at 18:00.

Rank	Lane	Name	Nationality	Time	Notes
1st place, gold medalist(s)	7	Chad le Clos	South Africa	1:41.45	
2nd place, silver medalist(s)	3	Danila Izotov	Russia	1:41.67	
3rd place, bronze medalist(s)	8	Ryan Lochte	United States	1:42.09	
4	4	Dominik Kozma	Hungary	1:42.25	
5	1	Péter Bernek	Hungary	1:42.44	
6	6	Velimir Stjepanović	Serbia	1:42.48	NR
7	2	Daniel Smith	Australia	1:42.81	
8	5	Cristian Quintero	Venezuela	1:43.45	
