= 2014 FINA Swimming World Cup =

International swimming competition

The 2014 FINA Swimming World Cup was a series of seven, two-day, short course meets in seven cities between August and November 2014. Mastbank was again the title sponsor for the series, with Omega serving as official timer.

== Meets ==
The 2014 World Cup consisted of the following seven meets:

| Meet | Dates | Location | Venue |
|---|---|---|---|
| 1 | 27–28 August | Doha, Qatar | Hamad Aquatic Centre |
| 2 | 31 August – 1 September | Dubai, United Arab Emirates | Dubai Sports Complex |
| 3 | 29–30 September | Hong Kong | Victoria Park Swimming Pool |
| 4 | 4–5 October | Moscow, Russia | Olimpiysky Sports Complex |
| 5 | 24–25 October | Beijing, China | Ying Tung Natatorium |
| 6 | 28–29 October | Tokyo, Japan | Tokyo Tatsumi International Swimming Center |
| 7 | 1–2 November | Singapore | OCBC Aquatic Centre |

== World Cup standings ==
- Composition of points:
  - Best performances (by meets): 1st place: 24 points, 2nd place: 18 points and 3rd place: 12 points;
  - Points for medals (in individual events): Gold medal: 12 points, Silver medal: 9 points and Bronze medal: 6 points;
  - Bonus for World Record (WR): 20 points.

=== Men ===
Official Top-20 Overall Scoring:

| Rank | Name | Nationality | Points awarded (Bonus) | | | | | | | Total |
| Rank | Name | Nationality | QAT | UAE | HKG | RUS | CHN | JPN | SIN | Total |
|---|---|---|---|---|---|---|---|---|---|---|
| 1 | Chad le Clos | South Africa | 54 | 66 | 72 | 90 | 72 | 60 | 60 | 474 |
| 2 | Dániel Gyurta | Hungary | 48 | 68 | 27 | 57 | 48 | 45 | 51 | 344 |
| 3 | Thomas Shields | United States | 39 | 48 | 81 | 57 | - | - | - | 225 |
| 4 | Thomas Fraser-Holmes | Australia | 48 | 45 | 48 | 45 | - | 21 | - | 207 |
| 5 | Marco Koch | Germany | 36 | 33 | 51 | 42 | - | - | - | 162 |
| 6 | Christian Diener | Germany | 30 | 33 | 24 | 36 | - | 12 | 15 | 150 |
| 7 | Steffen Deibler | Germany | 6 | 15 | - | 33 | 36 | 21 | 33 | 144 |
| 8 | Daiya Seto | Japan | - | - | - | - | 33 | 48 | 45 | 126 |
| 9 | Eugene Godsoe | United States | 21 | 21 | - | - | 12 | 21 | 30 | 105 |
| 9 | Roland Schoeman | South Africa | 18 | 21 | - | - | 18 | 21 | 27 | 105 |
| 11 | Gergely Gyurta | Hungary | - | - | 18 | 15 | 21 | 18 | 30 | 102 |
| 12 | Velimir Stjepanović | Serbia | 27 | 18 | 15 | 24 | - | - | 6 | 90 |
| 13 | George Bovell | Trinidad and Tobago | 21 | 21 | - | - | 18 | 9 | 18 | 87 |
| 14 | Devon Myles Brown | South Africa | - | - | - | - | 30 | 21 | 27 | 78 |
| 15 | Sergey Fesikov | Russia | - | - | - | - | 21 | 18 | 33 | 72 |
| 16 | Dávid Verrasztó | Hungary | 9 | 18 | 18 | 15 | - | - | - | 60 |
| 17 | Robert Hurley | Australia | 15 | 6 | - | 15 | - | - | 15 | 51 |
| 18 | Mitch Larkin | Australia | - | - | - | - | 30 | 18 | - | 48 |
| 19 | Hiromasa Fujimori | Japan | - | - | 24 | 6 | - | 15 | - | 45 |
| 20 | Ashley Delaney | Australia | - | 6 | 33 | - | | | | 39 |

=== Women ===
Official Top-20 Overall Scoring:

| Rank | Name | Nationality | Points awarded (Bonus) | | | | | | | Total |
| Rank | Name | Nationality | QAT | UAE | HKG | RUS | CHN | JPN | SIN | Total |
|---|---|---|---|---|---|---|---|---|---|---|
| 1 | Katinka Hosszú | Hungary | 189 | 166 | 162 | 126 | 114 | 132 | 105 | 994 |
| 2 | Inge Dekker | Netherlands | 60 | 66 | 60 | 66 | 45 | 33 | 42 | 372 |
| 3 | Alia Atkinson | Jamaica | 42 | 45 | 72 | - | 48 | 48 | 66 | 321 |
| 3 | Mireia Belmonte | Spain | 45 | 39 | 45 | 51 | 33 | 42 | 66 | 321 |
| 5 | Daryna Zevina | Ukraine | 30 | 27 | 27 | 39 | - | - | - | 123 |
| 6 | Marieke D'Cruz | Australia | 33 | 36 | - | - | - | 12 | 12 | 93 |
| 7 | Evelyn Verrasztó | Hungary | 9 | 12 | 36 | 30 | - | - | - | 87 |
| 8 | Caitlin Leverenz | United States | 21 | 21 | - | - | 9 | 15 | 6 | 72 |
| 8 | Rie Kaneto | Japan | - | - | 30 | 30 | - | 12 | - | 72 |
| 10 | Francesca Halsall | United Kingdom | - | - | - | - | - | 45 | 21 | 66 |
| 11 | Breeja Larson | United States | 30 | 30 | - | - | - | - | - | 60 |
| 12 | Emma McKeon | Australia | - | - | - | - | - | 30 | 18 | 48 |
| 13 | Rūta Meilutytė | Lithuania | - | - | - | - | - | 21 | 24 | 45 |
| 13 | Veronika Popova | Russia | - | - | 30 | 15 | - | - | - | 45 |
| 15 | Sally Hunter | Australia | - | - | - | - | 30 | 9 | - | 39 |
| 15 | Felicia Lee | United States | - | - | - | - | - | 15 | 24 | 39 |
| 15 | Aleksandra Urbanczyk | Poland | 27 | 12 | - | - | - | - | - | 39 |
| 15 | Madison Wilson | Australia | - | - | - | - | 24 | 15 | - | 39 |
| 19 | Franziska Hentke | Germany | 6 | 15 | - | - | - | 6 | 9 | 36 |
| 19 | Julia Hassler | Liechtenstein | 18 | 18 | - | - | - | - | - | 36 |
| 19 | Siobhan-Marie O'Connor | United Kingdom | - | - | - | - | - | 12 | 24 | 36 |
| 19 | Lisa Zaiser | Austria | 6 | 30 | - | - | - | - | - | 36 |

== Event winners ==
=== 50 m freestyle ===
| Meet | Men | | | Women | | |
| Meet | Winner | Nationality | Time | Winner | Nationality | Time |
|---|---|---|---|---|---|---|
| Doha | Josh Schneider | United States | 21.07 | Inge Dekker | Netherlands | 24.04 |
| Dubai | Josh Schneider | United States | 21.11 | Inge Dekker | Netherlands | 23.95 |
| Hong Kong | Chad le Clos | South Africa | 21.17 | Inge Dekker | Netherlands | 24.02 |
| Moscow | Chad le Clos | South Africa | 21.33 | Inge Dekker | Netherlands | 24.05 |
| Beijing | Chad le Clos | South Africa | 21.28 | Inge Dekker | Netherlands | 23.97 |
| Tokyo | Shinri Shioura | Japan | 21.38 | Francesca Halsall | United Kingdom | 23.80 |
| Singapore | George Bovell | Trinidad and Tobago | 21.37 | Francesca Halsall | United Kingdom | 23.80 |

=== 100 m freestyle ===
| Meet | Men | | | Women | | |
| Meet | Winner | Nationality | Time | Winner | Nationality | Time |
|---|---|---|---|---|---|---|
| Doha | Chad le Clos | South Africa | 46.29 | Inge Dekker | Netherlands | 52.61 |
| Dubai | Chad le Clos | South Africa | 46.24 | Inge Dekker | Netherlands | 52.01 |
| Hong Kong | Chad le Clos | South Africa | 46.35 | Inge Dekker | Netherlands | 52.83 |
| Moscow | Chad le Clos | South Africa | 46.60 | Inge Dekker | Netherlands | 52.83 |
| Beijing | Chad le Clos | South Africa | 46.81 | Inge Dekker | Netherlands | 52.72 |
| Tokyo | Katsumi Nakamura | Japan | 47.30 | Francesca Halsall | United Kingdom | 51.96 |
| Singapore | Sergei Fesikov | Russia | 47.02 | Emma McKeon | Australia | 52.45 |

=== 200 m freestyle ===
| Meet | Men | | | Women | | |
| Meet | Winner | Nationality | Time | Winner | Nationality | Time |
|---|---|---|---|---|---|---|
| Doha | Thomas Fraser-Holmes | Australia | 1:41.92 | Katinka Hosszú | Hungary | 1:51.41 WC |
| Dubai | Thomas Fraser-Holmes | Australia | 1:42.54 | Katinka Hosszú | Hungary | 1:52.25 |
| Hong Kong | Thomas Fraser-Holmes | Australia | 1:43.59 | Katinka Hosszú | Hungary | 1:51.44 |
| Moscow | Thomas Fraser-Holmes | Australia | 1:42.98 | Katinka Hosszú | Hungary | 1:53.18 |
| Beijing | Devon Myles Brown | South Africa | 1:44.12 | Katinka Hosszú | Hungary | 1:54.04 |
| Tokyo | Kosuke Hagino | Japan | 1:42.62 | Katinka Hosszú | Hungary | 1:52.45 |
| Singapore | Devon Myles Brown | South Africa | 1:43.39 | Katinka Hosszú | Hungary | 1:53.63 |

=== 400 m freestyle ===
| Meet | Men | | | Women | | |
| Meet | Winner | Nationality | Time | Winner | Nationality | Time |
|---|---|---|---|---|---|---|
| Doha | Thomas Fraser-Holmes | Australia | 3:39.30 | Mireia Belmonte | Spain | 4:00.91 |
| Dubai | Thomas Fraser-Holmes | Australia | 3:38.22 | Mireia Belmonte | Spain | 4:02.05 |
| Hong Kong | Thomas Fraser-Holmes | Australia | 3:41.01 | Katinka Hosszú | Hungary | 4:01.02 |
| Moscow | Thomas Fraser-Holmes | Australia | 3:40.59 | Mireia Belmonte | Spain | 4:01.54 |
| Beijing | Sun Yang | China | 3:37.10 | Cao Yue | China | 4:00.72 |
| Tokyo | Devon Myles Brown | South Africa | 3:37.96 | Mireia Belmonte | Spain | 4:00.87 |
| Singapore | David McKeon | Australia | 3:38.54 | Mireia Belmonte | Spain | 3:59.88 |

=== 1500 m (men)/800 m (women) freestyle ===
| Meet | Men | | | Women | | |
| Meet | Winner | Nationality | Time | Winner | Nationality | Time |
|---|---|---|---|---|---|---|
| Doha | Gergő Kis | Hungary | 14:50.24 | Mireia Belmonte | Spain | 8:14.99 |
| Dubai | Gergő Kis | Hungary | 14:53.06 | Mireia Belmonte | Spain | 8:04.88 |
| Hong Kong | Gergely Gyurta | Hungary | 14:38.72 | Katinka Hosszú | Hungary | 8:09.36 |
| Moscow | Sergiy Frolov | Ukraine | 14:38.21 | Mireia Belmonte | Spain | 8:12.12 |
| Beijing | Gergely Gyurta | Hungary | 14:38.27 | Katinka Hosszú | Hungary | 8:08.41 |
| Tokyo | Gergely Gyurta | Hungary | 14:36.38 | Mireia Belmonte | Spain | 8:08.57 |
| Singapore | Gergely Gyurta | Hungary | 14:28.35 | Mireia Belmonte | Spain | 8:10.61 |

=== 50 m backstroke ===
| Meet | Men | | | Women | | |
| Meet | Winner | Nationality | Time | Winner | Nationality | Time |
|---|---|---|---|---|---|---|
| Doha | Eugene Godsoe | United States | 23.22 | Katinka Hosszú | Hungary | 26.18 |
| Dubai | Eugene Godsoe | United States | 23.00 | Katinka Hosszú | Hungary | 26.10 |
| Hong Kong | Ashley Delaney | Australia | 23.73 | Katinka Hosszú | Hungary | 26.24 |
| Moscow | Christian Diener | Germany | 23.44 | Daryna Zevina | Ukraine | 26.33 |
| Beijing | Xu Jiayu | China | 23.29 | Fu Yuanhui | China | 26.43 |
| Tokyo | Miguel Ortiz-Cañavate | Spain | 23.30 | Francesca Halsall | United Kingdom | 26.42 |
| Singapore | Eugene Godsoe | United States | 23.21 | Felicia Lee | United States | 26.48 |

=== 100 m backstroke ===
| Meet | Men | | | Women | | |
| Meet | Winner | Nationality | Time | Winner | Nationality | Time |
|---|---|---|---|---|---|---|
| Doha | Christian Diener | Germany | 50.49 | Katinka Hosszú | Hungary | 56.02 |
| Dubai | Christian Diener | Germany | 50.10 | Katinka Hosszú | Hungary | 55.77 |
| Hong Kong | Ashley Delaney | Australia | 51.48 | Katinka Hosszú | Hungary | 55.34 |
| Moscow | Christian Diener | Germany | 50.31 | Katinka Hosszú | Hungary | 56.63 |
| Beijing | Xu Jiayu | China | 50.14 | Katinka Hosszú | Hungary | 56.73 |
| Tokyo | Eugene Godsoe | United States | 50.49 | Katinka Hosszú | Hungary | 56.07 |
| Singapore | Eugene Godsoe | United States | 50.59 | Katinka Hosszú | Hungary | 56.94 |

=== 200 m backstroke ===
| Meet | Men | | | Women | | |
| Meet | Winner | Nationality | Time | Winner | Nationality | Time |
|---|---|---|---|---|---|---|
| Doha | Christian Diener | Germany | 1:50.20 | Katinka Hosszú | Hungary | 2:01.60 |
| Dubai | Christian Diener | Germany | 1:49.14 | Katinka Hosszú | Hungary | 2:01.17 |
| Hong Kong | Thomas Shields | United States | 1:51.88 | Katinka Hosszú | Hungary | 2:03.01 |
| Moscow | Christian Diener | Germany | 1:50.96 | Katinka Hosszú | Hungary | 2:02.05 |
| Beijing | Mitch Larkin | Australia | 1:48.69 | Katinka Hosszú | Hungary | 2:02.71 |
| Tokyo | Yuki Shirai | Japan | 1:49.95 | Katinka Hosszú | Hungary | 2:01.97 |
| Singapore | Masaki Kaneko | Japan | 1:50.24 | Katinka Hosszú | Hungary | 2:03.07 |

=== 50 m breaststroke ===
| Meet | Men | | | Women | | |
| Meet | Winner | Nationality | Time | Winner | Nationality | Time |
|---|---|---|---|---|---|---|
| Doha | Roland Schoeman | South Africa | 26.35 | Alia Atkinson | Jamaica | 29.12 |
| Dubai | Roland Schoeman | South Africa | 26.16 | Alia Atkinson | Jamaica | 29.12 |
| Hong Kong | Marco Koch | Germany | 26.69 | Alia Atkinson | Jamaica | 29.35 |
| Moscow | Marco Koch | Germany | 26.52 | Jenna Laukkanen | Finland | 30.83 |
| Beijing | Roland Schoeman | South Africa | 26.87 | Alia Atkinson | Jamaica | 29.15 |
| Tokyo | Roland Schoeman | South Africa | 26.02 | Rūta Meilutytė | Lithuania | 29.36 |
| Singapore | Roland Schoeman | South Africa | 25.86 | Alia Atkinson | Jamaica | 29.00 |

=== 100 m breaststroke ===
| Meet | Men | | | Women | | |
| Meet | Winner | Nationality | Time | Winner | Nationality | Time |
|---|---|---|---|---|---|---|
| Doha | Dániel Gyurta | Hungary | 57.04 | Alia Atkinson | Jamaica | 1:03.79 |
| Dubai | Dániel Gyurta | Hungary | 57.11 | Alia Atkinson | Jamaica | 1:03.26 |
| Hong Kong | Dániel Gyurta | Hungary | 57.35 | Alia Atkinson | Jamaica | 1:03.23 |
| Moscow | Dániel Gyurta | Hungary | 57.20 | Rie Kaneto | Japan | 1:05.66 |
| Beijing | Dániel Gyurta | Hungary | 57.25 | Alia Atkinson | Jamaica | 1:04.11 |
| Tokyo | Dániel Gyurta | Hungary | 57.23 | Alia Atkinson | Jamaica | 1:02.86 |
| Singapore | Dániel Gyurta | Hungary | 56.87 | Alia Atkinson | Jamaica | 1:02.54 |

=== 200 m breaststroke ===
| Meet | Men | | | Women | | |
| Meet | Winner | Nationality | Time | Winner | Nationality | Time |
|---|---|---|---|---|---|---|
| Doha | Dániel Gyurta | Hungary | 2:01.06 (WC) | Breeja Larson | United States | 2:20.71 |
| Dubai | Dániel Gyurta | Hungary | 2:00.48 WR | Breeja Larson | United States | 2:20.02 |
| Hong Kong | Marco Koch | Germany | 2:02.50 | Rie Kaneto | Japan | 2:19.55 |
| Moscow | Dániel Gyurta | Hungary | 2:01.88 | Rie Kaneto | Japan | 2:19.29 |
| Beijing | Dániel Gyurta | Hungary | 2:03.40 | Sally Hunter | Australia | 2:19.26 |
| Tokyo | Dániel Gyurta | Hungary | 2:02.12 | Rie Kaneto | Japan | 2:19.18 |
| Singapore | Dániel Gyurta | Hungary | 2:02.30 | Alia Atkinson | Jamaica | 2:17.84 |

=== 50 m butterfly ===
| Meet | Men | | | Women | | |
| Meet | Winner | Nationality | Time | Winner | Nationality | Time |
|---|---|---|---|---|---|---|
| Doha | Chad le Clos | South Africa | 22.17 | Inge Dekker | Netherlands | 25.27 |
| Dubai | Chad le Clos | South Africa | 22.02 | Inge Dekker | Netherlands | 24.59 |
| Hong Kong | Chad le Clos | South Africa | 22.35 | Inge Dekker | Netherlands | 25.24 |
| Moscow | Chad le Clos | South Africa | 22.08 | Inge Dekker | Netherlands | 25.31 |
| Beijing | Chad le Clos | South Africa | 22.03 | Inge Dekker | Netherlands | 24.97 |
| Tokyo | Chad le Clos | South Africa | 22.20 | Inge Dekker | Netherlands | 25.18 |
| Singapore | Chad le Clos | South Africa | 21.98 | Inge Dekker | Netherlands | 25.13 |

=== 100 m butterfly ===
| Meet | Men | | | Women | | |
| Meet | Winner | Nationality | Time | Winner | Nationality | Time |
|---|---|---|---|---|---|---|
| Doha | Chad le Clos | South Africa | 48.70 | Inge Dekker | Netherlands | 56.05 |
| Dubai | Chad le Clos | South Africa | 48.59 | Inge Dekker | Netherlands | 56.03 |
| Hong Kong | Chad le Clos | South Africa | 48.56 | Inge Dekker | Netherlands | 56.03 |
| Moscow | Chad le Clos | South Africa | 48.99 | Inge Dekker | Netherlands | 56.08 |
| Beijing | Steffen Deibler | Germany | 49.96 | Lu Ying | China | 55.95 |
| Tokyo | Chad le Clos | South Africa | 48.95 | Inge Dekker | Netherlands | 56.11 |
| Singapore | Chad le Clos | South Africa | 48.74 | Inge Dekker | Netherlands | 56.08 |

=== 200 m butterfly ===
| Meet | Men | | | Women | | |
| Meet | Winner | Nationality | Time | Winner | Nationality | Time |
|---|---|---|---|---|---|---|
| Doha | Thomas Shields | United States | 1:50.08 | Mireia Belmonte | Spain | 2:03.39 |
| Dubai | Thomas Shields | United States | 1:50.19 | Katinka Hosszú | Hungary | 2:04.68 |
| Hong Kong | Thomas Shields | United States | 1:50.56 | Katinka Hosszú | Hungary | 2:05.12 |
| Moscow | Chad le Clos | South Africa | 1:49.73 | Katinka Hosszú | Hungary | 2:02.99 |
| Beijing | Chad le Clos | South Africa | 1:49.73 | Li Shuang | China | 2:04.34 |
| Tokyo | Chad le Clos | South Africa | 1:49.20 | Katinka Hosszú | Hungary | 2:03.14 |
| Singapore | Chad le Clos | South Africa | 1:48.88 | Mireia Belmonte | Spain | 2:04.57 |

=== 100 m individual medley ===
| Meet | Men | | | Women | | |
| Meet | Winner | Nationality | Time | Winner | Nationality | Time |
|---|---|---|---|---|---|---|
| Doha | George Bovell | Trinidad and Tobago | 52.80 | Katinka Hosszú | Hungary | 57.34* |
| Dubai | George Bovell | Trinidad and Tobago | 51.79 | Katinka Hosszú | Hungary | 57.75* |
| Hong Kong | Thomas Shields | United States | 52.51 | Katinka Hosszú | Hungary | 58.12 |
| Moscow | Thomas Shields | United States | 53.53 | Katinka Hosszú | Hungary | 58.93 |
| Beijing | Sergei Fesikov | Russia | 52.30 | Katinka Hosszú | Hungary | 58.11 |
| Tokyo | Kosuke Hagino | Japan | 52.03 | Katinka Hosszú | Hungary | 57.74 |
| Singapore | Sergey Fesikov | Russia | 52.09 | Katinka Hosszú | Hungary | 58.40 |

* Katinka Hosszú set a new world record of 57.25 seconds in the heats of this event in Doha, and another world record of 56.86 s in the heats in Dubai.

=== 200 m individual medley ===
| Meet | Men | | | Women | | |
| Meet | Winner | Nationality | Time | Winner | Nationality | Time |
|---|---|---|---|---|---|---|
| Doha | Thomas Fraser-Holmes | Australia | 1:53.92 | Katinka Hosszú | Hungary | 2:02.61 (WR) |
| Dubai | Chad le Clos | South Africa | 1:51.56 | Katinka Hosszú | Hungary | 2:02.13 WR |
| Hong Kong | Thomas Fraser-Holmes | Australia | 1:53.58 | Katinka Hosszú | Hungary | 2:03.60 |
| Moscow | Chad le Clos | South Africa | 1:52.72 | Katinka Hosszú | Hungary | 2:05.81 |
| Beijing | Daiya Seto | Japan | 1:54.21 | Katinka Hosszú | Hungary | 2:06.22 |
| Tokyo | Kosuke Hagino | Japan | 1:51.27 WC | Katinka Hosszú | Hungary | 2:05.18 |
| Singapore | Daiya Seto | Japan | 1:54.14 | Katinka Hosszú | Hungary | 2:06.01 |

=== 400 m individual medley ===
| Meet | Men | | | Women | | |
| Meet | Winner | Nationality | Time | Winner | Nationality | Time |
|---|---|---|---|---|---|---|
| Doha | Thomas Fraser-Holmes | Australia | 4:00.39 | Katinka Hosszú | Hungary | 4:20.83 WR |
| Dubai | Thomas Fraser-Holmes | Australia | 3:58.69 WC | Katinka Hosszú | Hungary | 4:22.06 |
| Hong Kong | Thomas Fraser-Holmes | Australia | 4:03.02 | Katinka Hosszú | Hungary | 4:26.42 |
| Moscow | Thomas Fraser-Holmes | Australia | 4:02.31 | Katinka Hosszú | Hungary | 4:25.33 |
| Beijing | Daiya Seto | Japan | 4:04.84 | Katinka Hosszú | Hungary | 4:25.66 |
| Tokyo | Daiya Seto | Japan | 3:59.91 | Katinka Hosszú | Hungary | 4:23.67 |
| Singapore | Daiya Seto | Japan | 4:04.07 | Mireia Belmonte | Spain | 4:22.68 |

Legend: WR – World record; (WR) – World record when swum (earning bonus World Cup points); WC – World Cup record; (WC) – World Cup record when swum

=== Mixed 4x50m freestyle relay ===
| Meet | Winner | |
| Meet | Team | Time |
|---|---|---|
| Doha | Austria (Martin Spitzer, Lena Kreundl, Gottfried Eisenberger, Lisa Zaiser) | 1:34.47 |
| Dubai | South Africa (Roland Schoeman, Leith Shankland, Lehesta Kemp, Taneal Baptiste) | 1:34.22 |
| Hong Kong | Hong Kong (Siobhan Bernadette Haughey, Ho Lun Raymond Mak, Geoffrey Cheah, Hang Yu Sze) | 1:33.65 |
| Moscow | Russia (Oleg Tikhobaev, Viacheslav Prudnikov, Elizaveta Bazarova, Veronika Popova) | 1:32.75 |
| Beijing | China (Yu Hexin, Tang Yi, Qiu Yuhan, Ning Zetao) | 1:31.69 |
| Tokyo | Japan (Hiromasa Fujimori, Kenta Ito, Shiho Sakai, Yayoi Matsumoto) | 1:33.28 |
| Singapore | Russia (Sergey Fesikov, Aleksandr Krashykh, Elizaveta Bazarova, Maria Astashkina) | 1:33.88 |

=== Mixed 4x50m medley relay ===
| Meet | Winner | |
| Meet | Team | Time |
|---|---|---|
| Doha | Finland (Anni Alitalo, Jenna Laukkanen, Riku Poytakivi, Ari-Pekka Liukkonen) | 1:42.26 |
| Dubai | Austria (Bernhard Reitshammer, Lisa Zaiser, Sascha Subarsky, Lena Kreudl) | 1:46.03 |
| Hong Kong | Hong Kong (Stephanie Hoi Shun Au, Chun Yan Wong, Hang Yu Sze, Geoffrey Cheah) | 1:43.28 |
| Moscow | Russia (Maria Kameneva, Andrei Nikolaev, Evgeny Korotyshkin, Elizaveta Bazarova) | 1:41.26 |
| Beijing | China (Xu Jiayu, Suo Ran, Lu Ying, Ning Zetao) | 1:40.10 |
| Tokyo | Japan (Shiho Sakai, Yasuhiro Koseki, Kenta Ito, Yayoi Matsumoto) | 1:40.51 |
| Singapore | Russia (Sergey Fesikov, Maria Astashkina, Aleksandr Krasnykh, Elizaveta Bazarova) | 1:43.26 |

NOTE: The mixed relay is not included in the overall scoring of the World Cup.
