= 2022 FINA World Swimming Championships (25 m) – Men's 200 metre butterfly =

Swimming competition

Men's 200 metre butterfly at the 2022 FINA World Swimming Championships (25 m)
- Venue: Melbourne Sports and Aquatic Centre
- Location: Melbourne, Australia
- Dates: 15 December (heats and final)
- Competitors: 27 from 25 nations
- Winning time: 1:48.27

Medalists
gold medal	Chad le Clos	South Africa
silver medal	Daiya Seto	Japan
bronze medal	Noè Ponti	Switzerland

The Men's 200 metre butterfly competition of the 2022 FINA World Swimming Championships (25 m) was held on 15 December 2022.

== Records ==
Prior to the competition, the existing world and championship records were as follows.

World record	Tomoru Honda (JPN)	1:46.85	Tokyo, Japan	22 October 2022
Competition record	Daiya Seto (JPN)	1:48.24	Hangzhou, China	11 December 2018

== Results ==
=== Heats ===
The heats were started at 11:46.

Rank	Heat	Lane	Name	Nationality	Time	Notes
1	3	5	Trenton Julian	United States	1:49.93	Q
2	4	5	Chad le Clos	South Africa	1:49.98	Q
3	3	4	Daiya Seto	Japan	1:49.99	Q
4	4	3	Teppei Morimoto	Japan	1:50.26	Q
5	2	5	Noè Ponti	Switzerland	1:50.69	Q
6	3	3	Kregor Zirk	Estonia	1:50.85	Q
7	4	2	Ilya Kharun	Canada	1:50.86	Q, NR
8	4	4	Alberto Razzetti	Italy	1:50.89	Q
9	2	4	Chen Juner	China	1:51.24	
10	2	3	Wang Kuan-hung	Chinese Taipei	1:51.26	
11	3	2	Zach Harting	United States	1:51.86	
12	4	6	Andreas Vazaios	Greece	1:52.28	
13	3	6	Antani Ivanov	Bulgaria	1:52.38	
14	3	7	Jakub Majerski	Poland	1:52.45	
15	4	7	Ondřej Gemov	Czech Republic	1:52.92	
16	2	6	José Ángel Martínez	Mexico	1:53.16	
17	2	1	Richard Nagy	Slovakia	1:54.92	NR
18	2	7	Adilbek Mussin	Kazakhstan	1:55.61	
19	4	1	Yeziel Morales	Puerto Rico	1:56.23	
20	3	1	Navaphat Wongcharoen	Thailand	1:56.37	NR
21	3	8	Erick Gordillo	Guatemala	1:56.93	NR
22	4	8	Carlos Vásquez	Honduras	1:58.63	
23	2	8	Xavier Ventura	El Salvador	2:02.63	
24	1	3	Isaiah Aleksenko	Northern Mariana Islands	2:02.96	
25	1	4	Jake Chee-A-Tow	Barbados	2:07.92	
26	1	6	James Hendrix	Guam	2:08.63	
27	1	5	Mohamed Rihan Shiham	Maldives	2:27.12	
	2	2	Xu Fang	China	Did not start	

=== Final ===
The final was held at 20:23.

Rank	Lane	Name	Nationality	Time	Notes
1st place, gold medalist(s)	5	Chad le Clos	South Africa	1:48.27	AF
2nd place, silver medalist(s)	3	Daiya Seto	Japan	1:49.22	
3rd place, bronze medalist(s)	2	Noè Ponti	Switzerland	1:49.42	NR
4	8	Alberto Razzetti	Italy	1:50.12	
5	7	Kregor Zirk	Estonia	1:50.51	NR
6	6	Teppei Morimoto	Japan	1:50.70	
7	4	Trenton Julian	United States	1:50.94	
8	1	Ilya Kharun	Canada	1:52.21	
