= 2022 FINA World Swimming Championships (25 m) – Men's 50 metre butterfly =

Swimming competition

Men's 50 metre butterfly at the 2022 FINA World Swimming Championships (25 m)
- Venue: Melbourne Sports and Aquatic Centre
- Location: Melbourne, Australia
- Dates: 13 December (heats and semifinals); 14 December (final)
- Competitors: 67 from 59 nations
- Winning time: 21.78 CR

Medalists
gold medal	Nicholas Santos	Brazil
silver medal	Noè Ponti	Switzerland
bronze medal	Szebasztián Szabó	Hungary

The Men's 50 metre butterfly competition of the 2022 FINA World Swimming Championships (25 m) was held on 13 and 14 December 2022.

== Records ==
Prior to the competition, the existing world and championship records were as follows.

World record	Nicholas Santos (BRA) Szebasztián Szabó (HUN)	21.75	Budapest, Hungary Kazan, Russia	6 October 2018 6 November 2021
Competition record	Nicholas Santos (BRA)	21.81	Hangzhou, China	15 December 2018

The following new records were set during this competition:

Date	Event	Name	Nationality	Time	Record
14 December	Final	Nicholas Santos	Brazil	21.78	CR

== Results ==
=== Heats ===
The heats were started on 13 December at 12:12.

Rank	Heat	Lane	Name	Nationality	Time	Notes
1	9	2	Noè Ponti	Switzerland	22.01	Q, NR
1	10	3	Teong Tzen Wei	Singapore	22.01	Q, AS
3	10	4	Szebasztián Szabó	Hungary	22.07	Q
4	8	4	Dylan Carter	Trinidad and Tobago	22.11	Q
5	10	6	Marius Kusch	Germany	22.19	Q
6	10	1	Matthew Temple	Australia	22.30	Q
7	8	5	Chad le Clos	South Africa	22.31	Q
8	8	6	Ilya Kharun	Canada	22.32	Q, WJ, NR
8	10	5	Matteo Rivolta	Italy	22.32	Q
10	7	4	Michael Andrew	United States	22.34	Q
11	8	3	Takeshi Kawamoto	Japan	22.38	Q
12	10	2	Daniel Zaitsev	Estonia	22.41	Q
13	9	1	Simon Bucher	Austria	22.44	Q, NR
14	9	4	Nicholas Santos	Brazil	22.46	Q
15	9	7	Youssef Ramadan	Egypt	22.50	Q, NR
16	8	7	Florent Manaudou	France	22.53	QSO
16	9	3	Nyls Korstanje	Netherlands	22.53	QSO
18	8	2	Yuya Tanaka	Japan	22.54	
19	9	5	Thomas Ceccon	Italy	22.57	
20	5	6	Karol Ostrowski	Poland	22.71	
21	9	6	Ümitcan Güreş	Turkey	22.75	
22	9	8	Jakub Majerski	Poland	22.80	
23	5	4	Mario Mollà	Spain	22.83	
24	6	8	Jan Šefl	Czech Republic	22.84	
25	6	3	Gabriel Santos	Brazil	22.89	
26	5	7	Meiron Cheruti	Israel	22.90	
26	6	5	Nikola Miljenić	Croatia	22.90	
26	7	6	Cameron Gray	New Zealand	22.90	
29	7	8	Andrii Govorov	Ukraine	22.92	
30	10	7	Nicholas Lia	Norway	23.00	
31	7	3	Oskar Hoff	Sweden	23.01	
32	6	7	Adilbek Mussin	Kazakhstan	23.09	NR
33	8	8	Abdelrahman Sameh	Egypt	23.11	
34	6	4	Josif Miladinov	Bulgaria	23.17	
35	5	3	Lewis Burras	United Kingdom	23.18	
36	7	1	Ng Cheuk Yin	Hong Kong	23.19	
37	7	2	Ádám Halás	Slovakia	23.29	
38	5	1	Julien Henx	Luxembourg	23.30	
38	7	7	Kristian Gkolomeev	Greece	23.30	
40	6	1	Ben Hockin	Paraguay	23.32	
40	10	8	José Martínez	Mexico	23.32	
42	6	6	Daniel Gracík	Czech Republic	23.36	
43	5	5	Clayton Jimmie	South Africa	23.41	
44	7	5	Alberto Lozano	Spain	23.43	
45	5	8	Eldor Usmonov	Uzbekistan	23.50	
46	6	2	Artur Barseghyan	Armenia	23.65	
47	5	2	Wang Kuan-hung	Chinese Taipei	23.68	
48	4	5	Jesse Ssengonzi	Uganda	23.79	NR
49	2	6	Andrei Anghel	Romania	23.85	
50	4	4	Abeku Jackson	Ghana	23.87	
51	4	6	Bernat Lomero	Andorra	24.29	
52	4	2	Ayman Kelzi	Syria	24.34	NR
53	4	8	Kokoro Frost	Samoa	25.03	
54	3	3	Epeli Herbert Jordan Rabua	Fiji	25.60	
55	3	5	Filipe Gomes	Malawi	25.90	
56	1	4	Aryen Muravvej	Suspended Member Federation	26.59	
57	3	6	Alassane Seydou Lancina	Niger	26.63	
58	3	2	Nathaniel Noka	Papua New Guinea	26.85	
59	3	7	Troy Pina	Cape Verde	26.90	
60	1	5	Shahbaz Khan	Pakistan	27.41	
61	2	2	Travis Dui Sakurai	Palau	28.20	
62	3	1	Fahim Anwari	Afghanistan	28.48	
63	3	8	Simanga Dlamini	Eswatini	28.70	
64	1	3	Pap Jonga	Gambia	29.20	
65	2	3	Ezuldeen Qatat	Libya	29.48	
66	2	5	Magnim Jordano Daou	Togo	34.76	
	3	4	Aidan Carroll	Gibraltar	Disqualified	
	2	4	Ibrahim Mohamed	Comoros	Did not start	
	2	7	Sheku Bangura	Sierra Leone	Did not start	
	4	1	Matthew Lawrence	Mozambique	Did not start	
	4	3	Lamar Taylor	Bahamas	Did not start	
	4	7	Akalanka Peiris	Sri Lanka	Did not start	
	8	1	Chen Juner	China	Did not start	

==== Swim-off ====
The swim-off was held on 13 December at 13:33.

Rank	Lane	Name	Nationality	Time	Notes
1	4	Florent Manaudou	France	22.31	Q
2	5	Nyls Korstanje	Czech Republic	22.35	

=== Semifinals ===
The semifinals were started on 13 December at 19:55.

Rank	Heat	Lane	Name	Nationality	Time	Notes
1	2	5	Szebasztián Szabó	Hungary	21.90	Q
2	1	5	Dylan Carter	Trinidad and Tobago	22.02	Q
3	2	4	Noè Ponti	Switzerland	22.04	Q
4	1	1	Nicholas Santos	Brazil	22.08	Q
5	2	6	Chad le Clos	South Africa	22.09	Q
6	2	3	Marius Kusch	Germany	22.14	Q
7	1	4	Teong Tzen Wei	Singapore	22.18	Q
8	1	6	Ilya Kharun	Canada	22.28	QSO, WJ, NR
8	1	7	Daniel Zaitsev	Estonia	22.28	QSO, NR
10	2	8	Youssef Ramadan	Egypt	22.32	NR
11	2	1	Simon Bucher	Austria	22.35	NR
12	1	3	Matthew Temple	Australia	22.37	
12	1	8	Florent Manaudou	France	22.37	
14	1	2	Michael Andrew	United States	22.47	
15	2	7	Takeshi Kawamoto	Japan	22.50	
	2	2	Matteo Rivolta	Italy	Disqualified	

==== Swim-off ====
The swim-off was held on 14 December at 10:55.

Rank	Lane	Name	Nationality	Time	Notes
1	5	Daniel Zaitsev	Estonia	22.15	Q, NR
2	4	Ilya Kharun	Canada	22.28	=WJ, =NR

=== Final ===
The final was held on 14 December at 21:20.

Rank	Lane	Name	Nationality	Time	Notes
1st place, gold medalist(s)	6	Nicholas Santos	Brazil	21.78	CR
2nd place, silver medalist(s)	3	Noè Ponti	Switzerland	21.96	NR
3rd place, bronze medalist(s)	4	Szebasztián Szabó	Hungary	21.98	
4	1	Teong Tzen Wei	Singapore	22.01	=AS
5	2	Chad le Clos	South Africa	22.11	
6	5	Dylan Carter	Trinidad and Tobago	22.14	
7	7	Marius Kusch	Germany	22.17	
8	8	Daniel Zaitsev	Estonia	22.38	
