= Swimming at the 2014 South American Games – Men's 200 metre butterfly =

Men's 200 metre butterfly at the 2014 South American Games
- Venue: Estadio Nacional
- Dates: March 8, 2014 (heats & finals)
- Competitors: 11 from 8 nations
- Winning time: 1:57.84

Medalists
gold medal	Leonardo de Deus	Brazil
silver medal	Mauricio Fiol	Peru
bronze medal	Andres Montoya	Colombia

The men's 200 metre butterfly competition at the 2014 South American Games took place on March 8 at the Estadio Nacional. The last champion was Leonardo de Deus of Brazil.

This race consisted of four lengths of the pool, all lengths being in butterfly stroke.

== Records ==
Prior to this competition, the existing world and Pan Pacific records were as follows:

World record	Michael Phelps (USA)	1:51.51	Rome, Italy	July 29, 2009
South American Games record	Leonardo de Deus (BRA)	2:01.20	Medellín, Colombia	March 27, 2010

== Results ==
All times are in minutes and seconds.

KEY:	q	Fastest non-qualifiers	Q	Qualified	CR	Championships record	NR	National record	PB	Personal best	SB	Seasonal best

=== Heats ===
The first round was held on March 8, at 10:40.

Rank	Heat	Lane	Name	Nationality	Time	Notes
1	1	5	Andres Montoya	Colombia	2:04.28	Q
2	1	4	Mauricio Fiol	Peru	2:04.32	Q
3	2	4	Leonardo de Deus	Brazil	2:05.51	Q
4	1	3	Maximiliano Abreu	Paraguay	2:05.66	Q, NR
5	2	5	Marcos Lavado	Venezuela	2:06.00	Q
6	2	3	Julio Galofre	Colombia	2:06.21	Q
7	1	2	Javier Vazquez Gonzalez	Chile	2:07.75	Q
8	2	6	Byron Franco Zambrano	Ecuador	2:08.19	Q
9	1	6	Joaquin Sepulveda Parra	Chile	2:08.75	
10	2	2	Carlos Orihuela Gianotti	Paraguay	2:08.88	
11	2	7	Aldo Castillo Sulca	Bolivia	2:12.71	

=== Final ===
The final was held on March 8, at 20:34.

Rank	Lane	Name	Nationality	Time	Notes
1st place, gold medalist(s)	3	Leonardo de Deus	Brazil	1:57.84	CR
2nd place, silver medalist(s)	5	Mauricio Fiol	Peru	1:58.81	
3rd place, bronze medalist(s)	4	Andres Montoya	Colombia	1:58.99	
4	2	Marcos Lavado	Venezuela	2:01.30	
5	7	Julio Galofre	Colombia	2:03.63	
6	6	Maximiliano Abreu	Paraguay	2:04.18	NR
7	1	Javier Vazquez Gonzalez	Chile	2:06.56	
8	8	Byron Franco Zambrano	Ecuador	2:07.99	
