= Noè Ponti =

Swiss swimmer (born 2001)

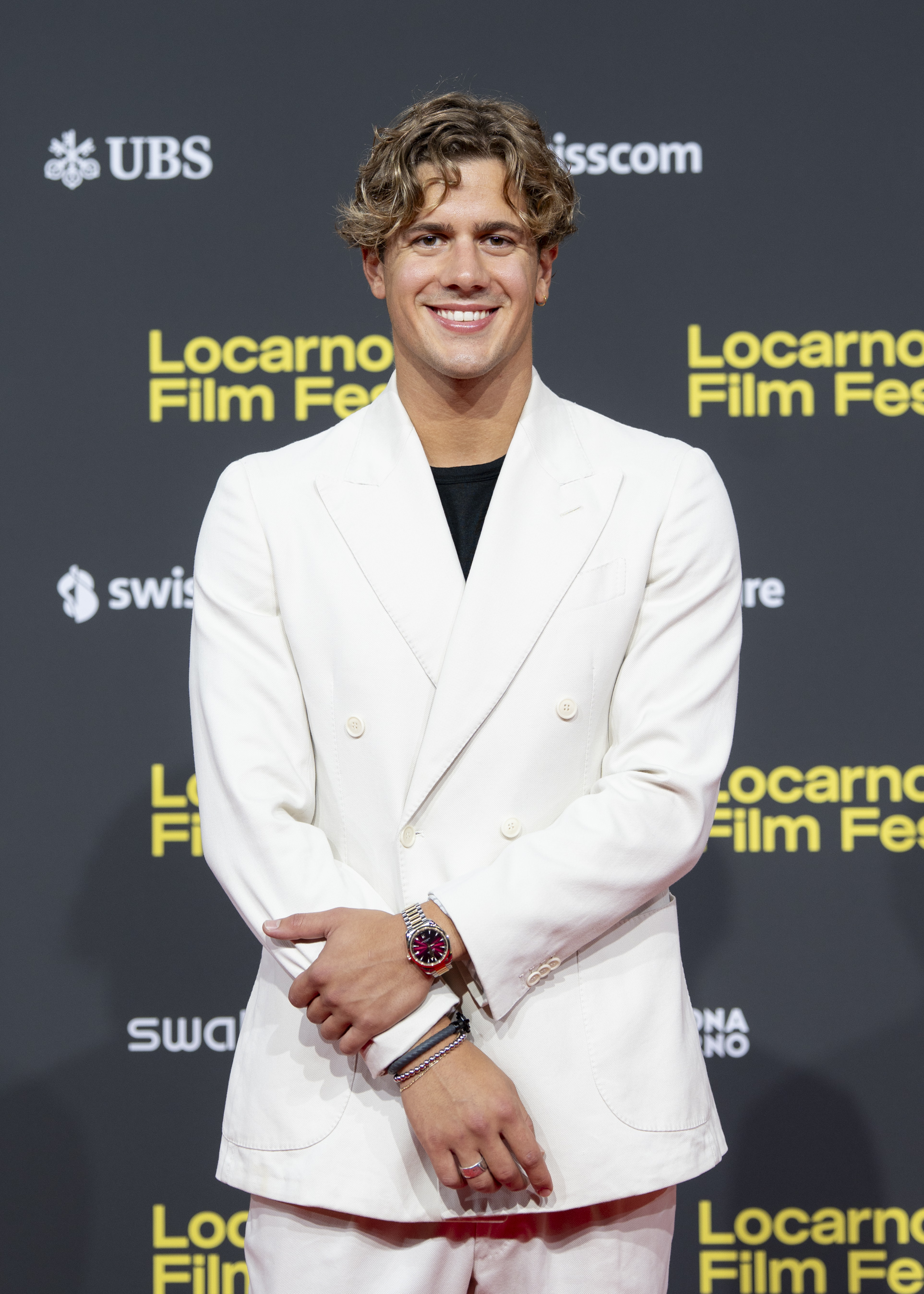
- Ponti in 2025

Personal information
- Born: 1 June 2001 (age 25) Locarno, Switzerland
- Height: 1.92 m (6 ft 4 in)

Sport
- Sport: Swimming
- Strokes: Butterfly, Individual Medley
- College team: NC State Wolfpack
- Coach: Braden Holloway (NCSU); Massimo Meloni (professional)
Medal record
Men's swimming
Representing Switzerland
Olympic Games
Bronze medal – third place	2020 Tokyo	100 m butterfly
World Championships (LC)
Silver medal – second place	2025 Singapore	50 m butterfly
Silver medal – second place	2025 Singapore	100 m butterfly
World Championships (SC)
Gold medal – first place	2024 Budapest	50 m butterfly
Gold medal – first place	2024 Budapest	100 m butterfly
Gold medal – first place	2024 Budapest	100 m medley
Silver medal – second place	2021 Abu Dhabi	200 m butterfly
Silver medal – second place	2022 Melbourne	50 m butterfly
Bronze medal – third place	2022 Melbourne	200 m butterfly
European Championships (LC)
Silver medal – second place	2022 Rome	100 m butterfly
Bronze medal – third place	2026 Paris	100 m butterfly
European Championships (SC)
Gold medal – first place	2023 Otopeni	50 m butterfly
Gold medal – first place	2023 Otopeni	100 m butterfly
Gold medal – first place	2023 Otopeni	200 m butterfly
Gold medal – first place	2025 Lublin	50 m butterfly
Gold medal – first place	2025 Lublin	200 m butterfly
Gold medal – first place	2025 Lublin	100 m medley
Silver medal – second place	2023 Otopeni	100 m medley
Silver medal – second place	2025 Lublin	100 m butterfly
European Junior Championships
Gold medal – first place	2019 Kazan	50 m butterfly
European Youth Olympic Festival
Silver medal – second place	2017 Győr	100 m butterfly
Silver medal – second place	2017 Győr	200 m medley
Bronze medal – third place	2017 Győr	200 m butterfly

Noè Ponti (born 1 June 2001) is a Swiss swimmer and short course world record holder in the 50 m butterfly. Representing Switzerland, he won a bronze medal in the 100 m butterfly at the 2020 Summer Olympics in Tokyo and competed again in the 2024 Paris Olympics in the 100 and 200 meter butterfly placing fourth and fifth.

== 2020 Tokyo Olympics ==
He represented Switzerland in the men's 4 × 100 metre freestyle relay at the 2020 Summer Olympics, where his team placed 14th with a time of 3:14.65. In the men's 4 × 200 metre freestyle relay, his relay team recorded a combined time of 7:06.12, a new Swiss record, placing sixth. Ponti swam a 1:46.63 for his relay leg.

Ponti placed third in the 100-meter butterfly swim, winning a bronze with at time of 50.74 with Caeleb Dressel of the USA taking the gold with a time of 49.45. He swam a 1:55.37 in the 200-meter butterfly, placing tenth, not qualifying for the finals.

== 2024 Paris Olympics ==
On 3 August 2024, he swam a fourth place 50.55 in the finals of the 100-meter butterfly at the Paris Olympics, and swam a 1:54.14 in the finals of the 200-meter butterfly to take fifth place on 31 July 2024.

=== North Carolina State University ===
Following the olympics, Ponti enrolled at North Carolina State University and joined the NC State Wolfpack swimming & diving team under Head Coach Braden Holloway. He left university and returned to Switzerland to continue his professional training after one month in the United States.

=== International competition ===
In August 2022, he won a silver medal in the 100-meter butterfly during the European Swimming Championships in Rome.

Ponti set a new world record for the 50-meter butterfly in October 2024 at the World Aquatics Swimming World Cup in Shanghai. On 11 December 2024, he swam a new world record for the same event during the 2024 Short Course World Championships in Budapest. At the 2024 short course World Aquatics Ponti won three gold medals and set world records in the 50- and 100-meter butterfly events.
