= Leonardo de Deus =

Brazilian swimmer (born 1991)

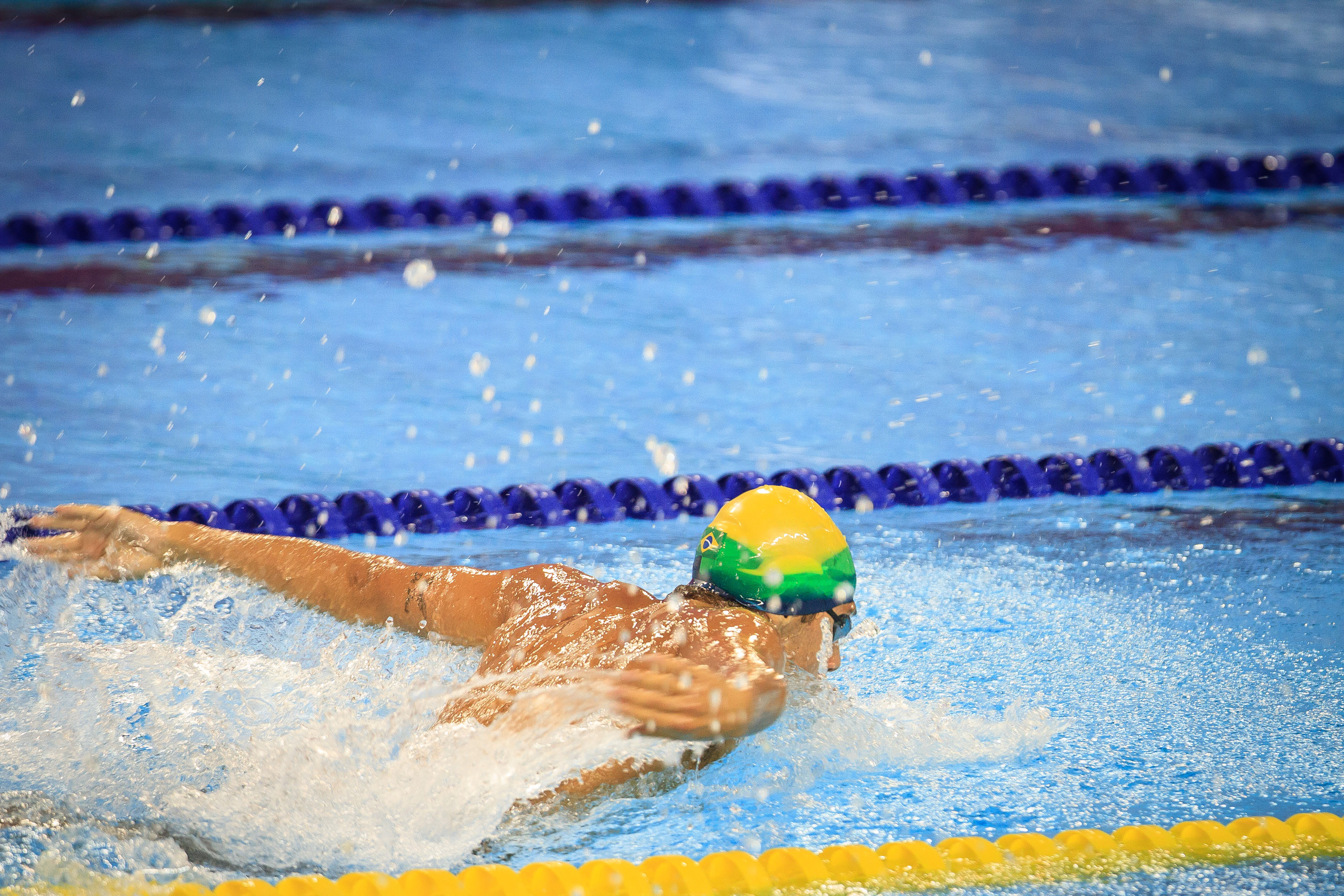
- Leo de Deus in 2015

Personal information
- Full name: Leonardo Gomes de Deus
- Nationality: Brazil
- Born: 18 January 1991 (age 35) Campo Grande, Mato Grosso do Sul, Brazil
- Height: 1.73 m (5 ft 8 in)
- Weight: 69 kg (152 lb)

Sport
- Sport: Swimming
- Strokes: Backstroke, butterfly, freestyle
Medal record
Men's swimming
Representing Brazil
World Championships (SC)
Gold medal – first place	2018 Hangzhou	4×200 m freestyle
Pan Pacific Championships
Silver medal – second place	2014 Gold Coast	200 m butterfly
Silver medal – second place	2018 Tokyo	200 m butterfly
Pan American Games
Gold medal – first place	2011 Guadalajara	200 m butterfly
Gold medal – first place	2015 Toronto	200 m butterfly
Gold medal – first place	2019 Lima	200 m butterfly
Gold medal – first place	2019 Lima	4×100 m mixed medley
Silver medal – second place	2011 Guadalajara	4×200 m freestyle
Silver medal – second place	2019 Lima	4×100 m medley
Silver medal – second place	2023 Santiago	200 m butterfly
Bronze medal – third place	2015 Toronto	200 m backstroke
Bronze medal – third place	2015 Toronto	400 m freestyle
Bronze medal – third place	2019 Lima	200 m backstroke
South American Games
Gold medal – first place	2010 Medellín	200 m butterfly
Gold medal – first place	2010 Medellín	200 m backstroke
Gold medal – first place	2014 Santiago	200 m butterfly
Gold medal – first place	2014 Santiago	200 m backstroke
Gold medal – first place	2022 Asunción	100 m backstroke
Gold medal – first place	2022 Asunción	200 m backstroke
Gold medal – first place	2022 Asunción	200 m butterfly
Silver medal – second place	2010 Medellín	4×200 m freestyle
South American Championships
Silver medal – second place	2012 Belém	200 m butterfly
Bronze medal – third place	2012 Belém	200 m backstroke
Military World Games
Gold medal – first place	2019 Wuhan	200 m butterfly
Gold medal – first place	2019 Wuhan	4×100 m freestyle
Silver medal – second place	2019 Wuhan	4×200 m freestyle

Leonardo Gomes de Deus (born 18 January 1991) is a Brazilian swimmer. In the 200 metre butterfly, he was 6th place at the 2020 Tokyo Games; twice a finalist in World Championships; twice Pan-Pacific runner-up, and three-time Pan American Games champion. He is currently an athlete at Unisanta (Universidade Santa Cecília), sponsored by Mormaii, LD Sports, and CDE. He is also one of the representatives of the Aqua Centurions team in the International Swimming League.

== International career ==
=== 2010–12 ===
In 2010, Deus joined the Brazilian national delegation and participated in the 2010 South American Games in Medellín. He won two gold medals, in the 200-metre backstroke and in the 200-metre butterfly, and a silver in the 4x200 freestyle relay.

He competed in the 2010 Pan Pacific Swimming Championships in Irvine, where he finished 9th in the 200-metre butterfly, and 11th in the 200-metre backstroke.

He also participated in the 2010 FINA World Swimming Championships (25 m), in Dubai, where he finished 28th in the 100-metre backstroke and 15th in the 200-metre butterfly.

He qualified for the semifinals of the 200-metre butterfly with the second fastest time (1:55.55) at the 2011 World Aquatics Championships in Shanghai, finishing 13th in the semifinal. He also qualified for semifinals of the 200-metre backstroke, finishing 15th.

Deus was at the 2011 Pan American Games in Guadalajara, where he was crowned champion of the 200-metre butterfly after a controversy involving alleged irregular sponsorship in the cap used in the final. Leonardo was disqualified after the game, but after protests from fans and the athletes themselves, the gold medal was returned to him. He also won silver in the 4×200-metre freestyle.

=== 2012 Summer Olympics ===
At the 2012 Summer Olympics, he qualified for the semifinal of the Men's 200-metre backstroke, finishing in 16th place overall in the heats, and seventh in his semifinal, failing to qualify for the final. He finished 13th in the 200-metre backstroke. He also came in 21st place in the 200-metre butterfly.

=== 2013–16 ===
At the 2013 World Aquatics Championships in Barcelona, Deus finished in 7th place of his first classification to a World Championship final, the 200-metre butterfly final, with a time of 1:56.06. He participated in the 200-metre backstroke, finishing 12th. He also participated in the 4×100-metre medley, finishing 12th, along with Marcelo Chierighini, Felipe Lima and Nicholas Santos.

At the 2014 South American Games in Santiago, Chile, he won two gold medals in the 200-metre butterfly and 200-metre backstroke, breaking the competition record in both races.

At the 2014 Maria Lenk Trophy in São Paulo, Deus broke the Brazilian record in 400-metre freestyle with a time of 3:50.90, improving Armando Negreiros's time from 1997 by twenty-eight hundredths of a second. In May 2014, at the Brazilian Junior and Senior Swimming Championships, he broke the Brazilian record again with a time of 3:50.71.

At the 2014 Pan Pacific Swimming Championships in Gold Coast, Australia, he won a silver medal in the 200-metre butterfly with a time of 1:55.28. He also finished 6th in the 200-metre backstroke and 12th in the 400-metre freestyle heats.

At the Brazilian Open, in Rio de Janeiro, he broke, for the third time, the Brazilian record in the 400-metre freestyle, with a time of 3:50.37.

In April 2015, at the Maria Lenk Trophy, in Rio de Janeiro, he broke the South American record in the 400-metre freestyle with a time of 3:49.62, and swam lifetime best in the 200-metre butterfly, with a time of 1:55.19, earning the best time of the year in the event.

At the 2015 Pan American Games in Toronto, Canada, de Deus won three medals: a gold in the Men's 200 metre butterfly, with a time of 1:55.01, new Pan Am Games record and a lifetime best; and two bronze medals in the Men's 200 metre backstroke and in the Men's 400 metre freestyle.

At the 2015 World Aquatics Championships in Kazan, de Deus didn't swim well in the Men's 200 metre butterfly. In the semifinal, he finished with a time of 1:56.02, far from his best mark, 1:55.01, achieved in Pan American Games a few days ago, and finished in 9th place, losing a spot in the final by 0.28 seconds. He also finished 13th in the Men's 200 metre backstroke.

=== 2016 Summer Olympics ===
At the 2016 Summer Olympics, he broke the Brazilian record in the Men's 200-metre backstroke, with a time of 1:57.00, at heats. He finished 13th place overall in the semifinals. In the Men's 200 metre butterfly, he didn't swim well: although he had earlier times that could qualify him for the Olympic final, didn't come close to these times, and with the 1:56.77 mark, he finished 13th place in the semifinals.

=== 2016–20 ===
At the 2016 FINA World Swimming Championships (25 m) in Windsor, Ontario, Canada, he went to the Men's 200 metre butterfly final, finishing 5th. He also finished 11th in the Men's 200 metre backstroke

At the 2017 World Aquatics Championships in Budapest, he finished 12th in the Men's 200 metre backstroke and 14th in the Men's 200 metre butterfly.

At the 2018 Pan Pacific Swimming Championships in Japan, he won a silver medal in the 200-metre butterfly, with a time of 1:54.89, his personal record.

At the 2018 FINA World Swimming Championships (25 m) in Hangzhou, China, the Brazilian team composed by Luiz Altamir Melo, Fernando Scheffer, Leonardo Coelho Santos and Breno Correia won the gold medal in the 4 × 200 freestyle relay, breaking the world record, with a time of 6:46.81. Leonardo de Deus won the gold medal by participating in Heats. He also finished 18th in the Men's 200 metre butterfly and 23rd in the Men's 100 metre butterfly He chose not to swim the Men's 200 metre backstroke.

At the 2019 World Aquatics Championships in Gwangju, South Korea, he reached his second World Championships final in the Men's 200 metre butterfly, finishing 7th. He also finished 22nd in the Men's 200 metre backstroke.

At the 2019 Pan American Games held in Lima, Peru, he became the first three-time champion in the Men's 200 metre butterfly in Pan's history. He won another bronze medal in the Men's 200 metre backstroke, repeating Toronto's results. He also won gold in the Mixed 4 × 100 metre medley relay and silver in the Men's 4 × 100 metre medley relay (both, by participating at heats).

=== 2020 Summer Olympics ===
At the 2020 Summer Olympics in Tokyo, Leonardo de Deus qualified for the semifinals of the Men's 200 metre butterfly in third place, with a time of 1:54.83. At 30 years of age, he broke his personal record in the race. In the semifinals he swam again below 1:55, qualifying in 2nd place for the final, this being Leonardo de Deus' first Olympic final, in his main event. In the final, he finished in 6th place.

=== 2021–24 ===
At the 2021 FINA World Swimming Championships (25 m) in Abu Dhabi, he finished 17th in the 200m butterfly with a time of 1:53.94.

At the 2022 World Aquatics Championships held in Budapest, Hungary, he did not have a good run in the 200m butterfly, finishing in 14th place with a time of 1:56.18.
