= Swimming at the 2010 South American Games – Men's 200 metre backstroke =

The Men's 200m backstroke event at the 2010 South American Games was held on March 26, with the heats at 10:37 and the Final at 18:23.

== Medalists ==
Gold	Silver	Bronze
Leonardo de Deus; Brazil	Thiago Pereira; Brazil	Juan López Nieto; Colombia

== Records ==
Standing records prior to the 2010 South American Games
World record	Aaron Peirsol (USA)	1:51.92	Rome, Italy	31 July 2009
Competition Record	Joaquin Belza (ARG)	2:05.00	Buenos Aires, Argentina	15 November 2006
South American record	Omar Pinzón (COL)	1:56.40	Rome, Italy	30 July 2009

== Results ==
=== Heats ===
Rank	Heat	Lane	Athlete	Result	Notes
1	2	4	Leonardo de Deus (BRA)	2:05.95	Q
2	1	5	Juan López Nieto (COL)	2:06.81	Q
3	2	5	Luis Rojas Martinez (VEN)	2:06.94	Q
4	3	4	Thiago Pereira (BRA)	2:07.33	Q
5	3	5	Juan David Pérez (COL)	2:09.13	Q
6	3	6	Charles Hockin (PAR)	2:10.06	Q
7	1	4	Gustavo Adolfo Taricco (ARG)	2:10.57	Q
8	3	3	Carlos Enrique Carvajal (ECU)	2:12.65	Q
9	1	3	Mauricio Fiol (PER)	2:17.15	
10	1	6	Alan Abarca Cortez (CHI)	2:18.36	
11	2	3	Ivan Marcelo Zavala (ECU)	2:18.88	
12	2	6	Victor Mauricio Garcia (PER)	2:20.31	
13	3	2	Ricardo Javier Ramirez (PAR)	2:21.68	
14	1	2	Marcelino Richaards (SUR)	2:25.52	
15	3	7	Armando Esteban Claure (BOL)	2:26.28	
	2	2	Jair Boerenveen (SUR)	DNS	
	2	7	Albert Subirats (VEN)	DNS	

=== Final ===
Rank	Lane	Athlete	Result	Notes
1st place, gold medalist(s)	4	Leonardo de Deus (BRA)	2:02.00	CR
2nd place, silver medalist(s)	6	Thiago Pereira (BRA)	2:02.13	
3rd place, bronze medalist(s)	5	Juan López Nieto (COL)	2:06.36	
4	2	Juan David Pérez (COL)	2:06.62	
5	3	Luis Rojas Martinez (VEN)	2:07.73	
6	7	Charles Hockin (PAR)	2:09.64	
7	1	Gustavo Adolfo Taricco (ARG)	2:10.95	
8	8	Carlos Enrique Carvajal (ECU)	2:11.46	
