= Azerbaijan at the 2025 World Aquatics Championships =

- Flag of Azerbaijan
- World Aquatics code: AZE
- National federation: Azerbaijan Swimming Federation

in Singapore
- Competitors: 2 in 1 sport
- Medals: Gold 0 Silver 0 Bronze 0 Total 0

World Aquatics Championships appearances
- 1994; 1998; 2001; 2003; 2005; 2007; 2009; 2011; 2013; 2015; 2017; 2019; 2022; 2023; 2024; 2025

Other related appearances
- Soviet Union (1973–1991)

Azerbaijan is competing at the 2025 World Aquatics Championships in Singapore from 11 July to 3 August 2025.

== Competitors ==
The following is the list of competitors in the Championships.

| Sport | Men | Women | Total |
|---|---|---|---|
| Swimming | 2 | 0 | 2 |
| Total | 2 | 0 | 2 |

== Swimming ==
Men

| Athlete | Event | Heat | | Semifinal | | Final | |
| Athlete | Event | Time | Rank | Time | Rank | Time | Rank |
|---|---|---|---|---|---|---|---|
| Suleyman Ismayilzada | 400 m freestyle | 4:01.33 | 38 | — | | Did not advance | |
| Suleyman Ismayilzada | 1500 m freestyle | 15:45.63 | 18 | — | | Did not advance | |
| Ramil Valizada | 100 m butterfly | 55.53 | 54 | Did not advance | | | |
| Ramil Valizada | 200 m butterfly | 2:02.14 | 29 | Did not advance | | | |
