= Coat of arms of Baku =

- Armiger: Baku
- Adopted: 14 April 1967
- Crest: Shield

The coat of arms of Baku is the official heraldic symbol of the city of Baku, the capital of Azerbaijan. The first emblem of the city was approved in 1840, changed in 1890, 1967, and 2001. The dimensions of the emblem are: width – 100 mm, height – 140 mm.

== Description and symbolism ==
The field of the emblem of Baku is blue. The field is charged with three golden flames and three wavy horizontal stripes that symbolize the waters of the Caspian Sea. The flames refer to the country's nickname, The Land of Fire. The field is surrounded by a thin golden contour. In the bottom part of the emblem, the black-colored area indicates the presence of petroleum.

== History ==
Coat of arms of Baku Governorate, Russian Empire

In 1841, General Golovin, commander-in-chief of the Caucasus, and Senator Gan, chairman of the Commission for Establishing Governance of the Transcaucasian region appointed by Russian Tsar, Nikolai II, notified the capital that the Caspian region (including Baku), and the other Caucasian districts did not have any coat of arms. On 21 May 1843, the Tsar approved a coat of arms for the Georgian-Imeretian governorate and the Caspian region (which included Baku). The first coat of arms of Baku city was in the form of a shield, divided in two. The upper half contained a golden background and the lower part had a blue background. The figures used in the emblem included a camel carrying saffron, a tiger, burning gas that bursting from the ground, and an anchor. The 1843 Baku coat of arms did not directly represent the city. On 16 March 1883, a new coat of arms for Baku city, designed and received imperial approval. The coat of arms designed in1883 resembled a black shield with three golden flames on it. On the top emblem, there was a golden crown with two turrets, and it was flanked by two golden spikes. The coat of arms of Baku also included a black shield with three golden flames, which signified the natural resources such as oil and gas of the Absheron peninsula. After the Soviets came to power, all the symbols were changed in the Azerbaijani heraldic coat of arms, as in other Soviet republics. In addition, the city and region's emblems were redesigned. The emblem which previously designed in 1883, was adopted on April 14, 1967, with some modifications, and finally, in 1975, some additions were made. In 1967, three golden flames on the emblem were not changed but stylized. In addition, five sea waves were added to the lower part of the emblem.

== Gallery ==
Black Version

Flag of Baku

== See also ==
- National emblem of Azerbaijan
- Emblem of the Azerbaijan SSR
