= National symbols of Azerbaijan =

The national symbols of Azerbaijan are official and unofficial flags, icons or cultural expressions that are emblematic, representative or otherwise characteristic of Azerbaijan and of its culture.

== Official symbols ==
Image	Name	Description	Date
The flag of Azerbaijan	National Flag	The flag consists of three equally sized horizontal pales (blue, red and green colors). There is a white crescent and an eight-pointed star in the center of the flag. The blue pale symbolizes Turkic heritage, the red pale symbolizes the progress to establish a modern state and the development of democracy and the green pale symbolizes the nation's relation to the Islamic civilization. The crescent symbolizes Islam and the eight-pointed star symbolizes eight branches of Turkic nation. Proportions of the flag are 1:2.	Adopted November 9, 1918.
Emblem of Azerbaijan	National Emblem	Tongues of flame symbolizing "The land of Fire" are depicted in the centre of the emblem. The symbol of flame is also interpreted as Arabic word "Allah". Colors used in the emblem are colors of the national flag of Azerbaijan. An eight-pointed star symbolizes eight branches of Turkic nation. At the bottom of the emblem is a stalk of wheat and branch of oak. The stalk of wheat symbolizes richness and fertility. The branch of oak symbolizes antiquity of the country. A shield in the emblem means defense.	Adopted January 19, 1993.
	March of Azerbaijan	The national anthem of Azerbaijan is considered one of national symbols of Azerbaijan. Melody of the anthem was composed in 1919, by Azerbaijani composer Uzeyir Hajibeyov and words were written by poet Ahmad Javad.	Adopted May 27, 1992.
Declaration of independence of Azerbaijan	Declaration of Independence	On this day whole Azerbaijan celebrates a historical event – the day of declaration of independence of the Republic of Azerbaijan in 1918. May 28 is the national holiday.	Adopted May 28, 1992.
Qizil Ulduz Medal	Qizil Ulduz Medal	Is a medal of the National Hero of Azerbaijan and the high-level decoration of the Republic of Azerbaijan. The medal is conferred for courage and bravery shown in defense of sovereignty and territorial integrity of the Republic of Azerbaijan, safeguarding of peace and security of the population.	Adopted March 25, 1992.
	Heydar Aliyev Order	Is the highest decoration of the Republic of Azerbaijan. Citizens of Azerbaijani Republic are conferred this order for exceptional merits favoring progress, development and glory of Azerbaijan; bravery and valor in defense of the motherland, protection of state interests of Azerbaijani Republic.	Adopted April 22, 2005.
	Shah Ismail Order	Is the highest military award of Azerbaijan. The order is conferred for particular merits in organizing and strengthening of the Azerbaijani Armed Forces; for particular merits in provision of territorial integrity and security of Azerbaijani Republic; for distinguished courage in the military; for special contributions in eliminating emergency situations in the country.	Adopted December 6, 1993.

== Unofficial symbols ==
Image	Name	Description
Ateshgah	The Land of Fire	Motto of Azerbaijan. Azerbaijani land is famed as "The land of fire" due to its natural burning gas resource from ancient times (because of existence of oil fields). Religious notions of fire worshippers were connected to this phenomenon. Ateshgah ("A place of fire") – temple of Zoroastrian worshippers is located in the outskirts of Surakhani village where burning gas goes out form ancient times. Nowadays, the symbol of fire is broadly used in the country. The fire is considered the symbol of Azerbaijan.
Maiden Tower	Maiden Tower	Maiden Tower is an ancient serfdom construction at a coastal side of "Old City" – Icheri Sheher in Baku. The tower is considered one of the most essential parts of maritime façade of the capital. There are many legends about the origin of the Maiden Tower, many of which are connected to the meaning of the word "maiden". The tower was built in two stages: the first is dated to the pre-Islamic era, but an inscription with an indication of the architect's name belongs to the 12th century. The tower can be seen in pictures by eminent artists. A poem, film and ballet are dedicated to the tower. In 1964, the Maiden Tower became a museum, and in 2000 it was included in a UNESCO List of World Heritage Sites in Azerbaijan.
Rock paintings of Gobustan	Gobustan	Is an architectural reserve to the south from Baku. It is famed for cultural landscape of rock paintings. The paintings were found out in three parts of the rocky plateau and once inhabited caves, traces of settlements and burial vaults indicates a dense occupation of this territory in a period between upper paleolith and the Middle Ages. In 1966, Gobustan was declared a reserve, and in 2007, the cultural landscape of rock paintings of Gobustan was included into the list of the world cultural heritage of UNESCO.
	Pomegranate	The pomegranate is considered one of the symbols of Azerbaijan. Annually in October, a cultural festival is held in Goychay, Azerbaijan known as the Goychay Pomegranate Festival. The festival features Azerbaijani fruit-cuisine mainly the pomegranates from Goychay, which is famous for its pomegranate growing industry.
	Mugham	Is a traditional music genre characterized by a great level of improvisations. Mugham in Azerbaijan is generally performed to the accompaniment of saz players which include: tar, kemancha and daf players. Frequently the daf player is a singer (khanende). Themes of mughams are often taken from lyrics – love and philosophic poetry. As a rule, ghazels of classics such as Nizami, Fuzûlî, Khaqani, Vidadi, Nasimi, Molla Panah Vagif and others are the texts of mughams. In 2008, mugham was included into a list of masterpieces of oral and non-material cultural heritage of UNESCO.
Karabakh stallion	Karabakh horse	Is a mountain-steppe racing and riding horse developed in Karabakh. They were developed under the influence of Iranian, Turkoman and then Arabian horses. It has influenced upon riding-horse breeding of southern Russia and several countries of Southern Europe (Poland and France). They were used for improvement of local horses of the South Caucasus Breeding work for improvement of Karabakh horses was conducted once in Aghdam horse breeding plant of the Azerbaijan SSR. At present, there are 2 horse breeding plants in Azerbaijan for popularization of Karabakh race – in Lambaran village of Barda Rayon and in Agstafa Rayon. Besides that, a number of private enterprises also function in the republic alongside the latter ones.
Tar	Tar	Tar is a plucked string instrument with a long neck. Performance on tar and also the arts of its production is developed throughout whole territory of Azerbaijan. Skills connected to this tradition are of great importance in formation of cultural identity of Azerbaijanis. Tar is considered the musical symbol of Azerbaijan. In 2012, Azerbaijani arts of performance on tar and mastery of its production was included into the list of masterpieces of oral and non-material cultural heritage of UNESCO.
Azerbaijani carpet of Shirvan group	Azerbaijani carpet	Carpet weaving is the most broadly spread classic type of handicraft in Azerbaijan. Guba, Shirvan, Ganja, Qazakh, Garabakh and Baku are the main centers of carpet weaving in Azerbaijan. Azerbaijani carpets are distinguished for their bright colors, with harmonizing intensive tints. Carpet weaving – is a part of family tradition which is passed both orally and in the course of practical lessons. In 2010, traditional carpet weaving arts of Azerbaijan was included into the list of masterpieces of oral and non-material cultural heritage of UNESCO. Carpets are also considered the symbol of Azerbaijani nation.
Buta	Buta	Buta ornament famed in Eastern countries in a broad territory is a typical detail of Azerbaijani national ornament. Buta motif is often used by Azerbaijani master. There are a lot of types of buta and some of them have their own symbolic meaning. Today, this ornament is widely used in Azerbaijan: on carpets, textiles and decoration of buildings. Buta is considered the symbol of Azerbaijan.
Oil wells in Neft Daşları	Petroleum and Oil rigs	Oil industry is a leading branch of Azerbaijani economy. Rich oil deposits in Azerbaijan were famed for a long time. The first oil well was drilled in Baku in 1848. Azerbaijani oilmen produced 80% of fuel of whole country during World War II. The world's oldest offshore oil platform is also located in Azerbaijan (Oil Rocks). Oil became the symbol of Azerbaijan.
