= Azerbaijan at the 2011 World Aquatics Championships =

Sporting event delegation

- Flag of Azerbaijan
- World Aquatics code: AZE
- National federation: Azerbaijan Swimming Federation

in Shanghai, China
- Competitors: 8 in 3 sports
- Medals: Gold 0 Silver 0 Bronze 0 Total 0

World Aquatics Championships appearances
- 1994; 1998; 2001; 2003; 2005; 2007; 2009; 2011; 2013; 2015; 2017; 2019; 2022; 2023; 2024; 2025

Other related appearances
- Soviet Union (1973–1991)

Azerbaijan competed at the 2011 World Aquatics Championships in Shanghai, China between July 16 and 31, 2011.

== Diving ==
Azerbaijan has qualified 2 athletes in diving.

Men

Athlete	Event	Preliminary		Semifinals		Final	
Athlete	Event	Points	Rank	Points	Rank	Points	Rank
Farid Gurbanov	Men's 3m Springboard	231.50	52	did not advance			
Dmitriy Sorokin	Men's 3m Springboard	272.10	49	did not advance			
Farid Gurbanov; Dmitriy Sorokin	Men's 3m Synchro Springboard	220.71	20			did not advance	

== Open water swimming ==
Men

Athlete	Event	Final	
Athlete	Event	Time	Position
Sergiy Fesenko	Men's 5km	DNS	
Sergiy Fesenko	Men's 10km	1:54:45.2	14

Women

Athlete	Event	Final	
Athlete	Event	Time	Position
Inha Kotsur	Women's 5km	1:01:15.4	22
Inha Kotsur	Women's 10km	2:06:00.1	32
Anastasiya Zhidkova	Women's 10km	DNF	

== Swimming ==
Azerbaijan qualified 3 swimmers.

Men

Athlete	Event	Heats		Semifinals		Final	
Athlete	Event	Time	Rank	Time	Rank	Time	Rank
Boris Kirillov	Men's 50m Backstroke	27.25	29	did not advance			
Boris Kirillov	Men's 100m Backstroke	1:01.03	49	did not advance			
Yeugeniy Lazuka	Men's 50m Butterfly	24.14	22	did not advance			
Yeugeniy Lazuka	Men's 100m Butterfly	54.70	42	did not advance			

Women

Athlete	Event	Heats		Semifinals		Final	
Athlete	Event	Time	Rank	Time	Rank	Time	Rank
Oksana Hatamkhanova	Women's 50m Breaststroke	37.94	28	did not advance			
Oksana Hatamkhanova	Women's 100m Breaststroke	1:22.66	42	did not advance			
