= Emblem of the Nakhichevan Autonomous Soviet Socialist Republic =

- Armiger: Nakhichevan Autonomous Soviet Socialist Republic
- Adopted: 14 March 1937; Current version on 21 April 1978
- Crest: Red star
- Supporters: Wheat and Cotton
- Motto: Бүтүн өлкəлəрин пролетарлары, бирлəшин! (Azeri); Пролетарии всех стран, соединяйтесь! (Russian) "Workers of the world, unite!"
- Earlier version(s): 1921, 1927, and 1931

The emblem of the Nakhichevan Autonomous Soviet Socialist Republic was adopted in 1937 by the government of the Nakhichevan Autonomous Soviet Socialist Republic. The emblem almost is identical to the emblem of the Azerbaijan Soviet Socialist Republic.

== History ==
The emblem was described in the Article 111 of the Constitution of the Nakhichevan Autonomous Soviet Socialist Republic. It was adopted on September 18, 1937 by the Extraordinary X Congress of Soviets of the Nakhichevan Autonomous Soviet Socialist Republic (approved on April 7, 1941 by the Fourth Session of the Supreme Council of the Azerbaijan SSR). The article contained the following description:

The State Emblem of the Nakhichevan Autonomous Soviet Socialist Republic is the State Emblem Azerbaijan SSR, which is an image of a sickle and a hammer, an oil rig against the backdrop of the rising sun, framed with a wreath of cotton and ears, with the inscription in the Azerbaijani and Armenian languages: "The Azerbaijan Soviet Socialist Republic", "Proletarians of all countries, unite!" and "Nakhichevan ASSR." At the top of the emblem is a five-pointed star.

— Constitution of the Nakhichevan ASSR (1937), Article 111

=== First revision ===
On August 25, 1938 (according to other sources - July 28, 1939) in this description, the words "and Armenian" were replaced by the words "and Russian" and the emblem of the Nakhichevan ASSR began to differ from the emblem of the Azerbaijan SSR by the name of the Autonomous Republic in Azerbaijani and Russian languages on lower tape interceptions.

=== Second revision ===
In accordance with the Law of the Azerbaijan SSR "On the Transfer of Azerbaijani Writing from the Latin to the Russian Alphabet" adopted on July 11, 1939, the writing of the Azerbaijani language from January 1, 1940 was translated from the Latin alphabet into the alphabet on the basis of the Russian alphabet, in which the inscriptions in the emblem of Nakhichevan was changed

=== Third revision ===
In connection with the change in the Azerbaijani language of the word "autonomous" since 1945, the abbreviation "MSSR" instead of the abbreviation "ASSR" was depicted instead of the abbreviation "MSSR".

This version of the emblem has not changed after the adoption in 1978 of the new Constitution of the Nakhichevan ASSR.

== Gallery ==
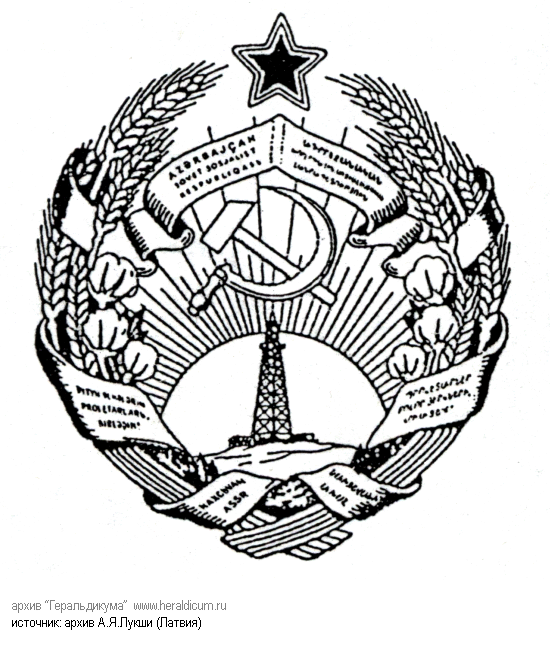
1937–1938/1939

1938/1939–1940

1940–1945

1945–1978

1978–1990

== See also ==
- Flag of the Nakhichevan Autonomous Soviet Socialist Republic
- Emblem of the Azerbaijan Soviet Socialist Republic
