= 1927 Constitution of the Azerbaijan Socialist Soviet Republic =

1927 Constitution of the Azerbaijan SSR
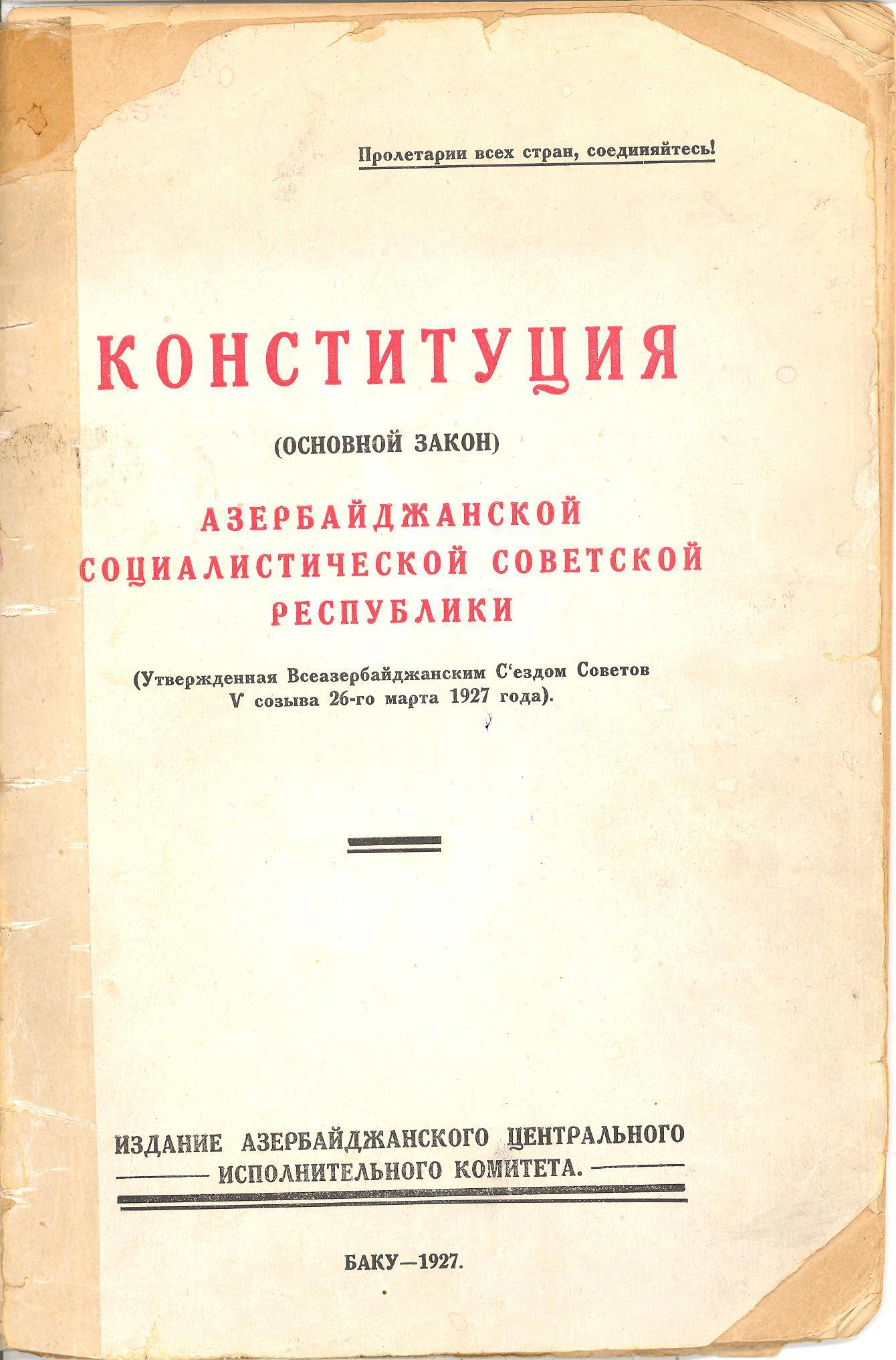

Overview
- Original title: Конституция Азербайджанской Социалистической Советской Республики
- Jurisdiction: Azerbaijan Soviet Socialist Republic
- Created: 1925
- Presented: 1926
- Ratified: 26 March 1927
- Date effective: 26 March 1927
- Last amended: 14 March 1925
- Location: Baku
- Author(s): CEC of Azerbaijan
- Supersedes: 1921 Constitution of the Azerbaijan Socialist Soviet Republic

The 1927 Constitution of the Azerbaijan Socialist Soviet Republic (Russian: Конституция Азербайджанской Социалистической Советской Республики, Konstitutsiya Azerbaydzhanskoy Sotsialisticheskoy Sovetskoy Respubliki; Azerbaijani: Azərbaycan İctimai Şuralar Cümhuriyyətinin Qonstitusiyasi) was the communist state constitution adopted by the Central Executive Committee of the Azerbaijan SSR at the 5th All-Azerbaijani Congress of Soviets on March 26, 1927.

The constitution was based on the 1925 Constitution of the Russian SFSR and the Constitution of the Transcaucasian SFSR.

== Background ==
Shortly after the adoption of the first constitution of the Azerbaijan SSR, on March 12, 1922, the Transcaucasian Socialist Federative Soviet Republic was formed, and on December 30 on the same year, the USSR was formed. These union formations emphasizes the status of Azerbaijan SSR as a union republic, rather than a separate soviet republic. The first constitution was amended after these changes on 1925.

In later years, the entry of the Nakhichevan ASSR under Azerbaijan SSR, further changes of the state apparatus, political, and socio-economical life, prompted the government to change the constitution as a whole. This led to the adoption of the 1927 Constitution of Azerbaijan SSR at the 5th All-Azerbaijan Soviet Congress on 26 March 1927.

== Structure ==
The Constitution is divided into 5 sections and 9 chapters. The constitution consisted of 101 verses.

=== Section One: General Provisions ===
1. General Provisions

=== Section Two ===
2. About the affairs of the Azerbaijani Soviet Congress and the Soviet of the Central Executive Committee of the Azerbaijan SSR

=== Section Three: Apparatus of the Soviet Power ===
3. Central Government

1. About the Azerbaijan Congress of Soviets
2. About the Central Executive Committee of the Azerbaijan SSR
3. About the Presidium of the Central Executive Committee of the Azerbaijan SSR
4. About the Council of People's Commissars
5. About the People's Commissars of the Azerbaijan SSR

4. About the Supreme Court of the Azerbaijan Socialist Soviet Republic
5. About the Nakhichevan Socialist Soviet Republic and the Nagorno-Karabakh Autonomous Oblast
6. Regional Government

1. About the Soviet Congress
2. About the Executive Committees
3. About the Soviet Deputies
4. About the affairs of the local authorities

7. About the Elections of the Soviet Government

1. Active and passive suffrage
2. About the candidates of the election
3. About the validation of elections and on the dismissal of deputies

=== Section Four ===
8. About budgeting rights

=== Section Five ===
9. About the flag and the emblem of the Azerbaijan Socialist Soviet Republic

== Frame of the Constitution ==
=== Section One ===
The first section of the constitution contains the general provisions of the organization of power in the republic. In general, it is modeled on the first chapter of the 1925 Constitution of the RSFSR, with some of its articles are copied directly from the Constitution of the RSFSR, and some others copied the articles of the Constitution of RSFSR with minor changes.

The section states that Azerbaijan SSR is a sovereign state." However, the limits of the sovereignty of the Azerbaijan SSR are set to the authority of the supreme bodies of the USSR and the Transcaucasian SFSR. The same article extends this sovereignty to the right of free withdrawal from the Transcaucasian Socialist Federative Soviet Republic. This statement itself is contradictory to the Constitution of the Transcaucasian SFSR and the USSR, on which the only way of the withdrawal of the republic was by territorial and border changes, and these matters were administered by the supreme bodies of the USSR.

The section enumerates the terms for an Azerbaijani citizenship. The constitution states that an Azerbaijani citizen is also the citizen of the Transcaucasian SFSR and the USSR with the basis of each entities' constitution. However, the Transcaucasian SFSR does not have special legislation on its citizenship, while in Azerbaijan there are the law "Detailed Provision on Azerbaijani Citizenship" which was adopted by the CEC of the Azerbaijan SSR on May 14, 1927, and the USSR with the law "Provisions on Union Citizenship" which was adopted on October 29, 1924.

=== Section Two ===
The second section of this constitution contains the issues under the jurisdiction of the All-Azerbaijan Congress of Soviets and the Azerbaijan Central Executive Committee. This section is modeled with the same chapter of the 1925 Constitution of the RSFSR, but with several additional articles about territorial changes and the legislation of the Azerbaijani citizenship.

=== Section Three ===
The third section of the constitution enumerates to the structure of the Soviet government. The constitution was modeled with the same chapter of the 1925 Constitution of the RSFSR.

The Central Executive Committee of the Azerbaijan SSR was enumerated as a legislative, regulatory and supervisory body. The work of the Presidium was held in the presidiums of the committee and separate commissions. The Greater Presidium reviewed and approved legislation-specific decisions, while the lesser presidium was established in 1932 in place of the MICS Secretariat, which included the chairman, deputy chairman, secretary of the SCC, as well as the People's Commissar for Public Employees Inspection.

The government of Azerbaijan was enumerated in the constitution, consisting of the chairman of the Sovnarkom, the deputy and 11 people's commissars. The Heads of the Nakhchivan Autonomous Region and Nagorno-Karabakh Territorial Council, the Baku Soviet, the State Planning Committee, the State Political Office and the State Oil Company of Azerbaijan (Azneft) also acts as the consultative part of the government. Members of the Government, as well as the representatives of the People's Commissariat of the Transcaucasian SFSR, were included with consultative or decisive voice.

The Supreme Court of the Azerbaijan SSR was established by the constitution as a part of the system of a single People's Court. The Supreme Court of the Azerbaijan SSR controls judicial affairs in the Azerbaijan SSR.

The Nakhichevan ASSR and the Nagorno-Karabakh AO was established by the constitution as an integral part of the ASSR and under its jurisdiction.

The local governments of the Azerbaijan SSR is divided into county and district. The rate of representation for county assemblies is 1 deputy per 100 voters from city councils and 1 deputy per 1,000 district population. The Councils of Workers, Peasants, Red Army and Sailor's Deputies are formed in other cities of the Azerbaijan SSR with a significant working population. For cities with more than 10,000 people, it is estimated that 1 deputy is for every 300 citizens. In rural communities, it is estimated that 1 deputy is for 25-40 villagers. On the condition of a city that do not meet the conditions specified, the council are not formed and the authority of the appropriate district congress of the councils and the district executive committee extends to these cities. The same condition applies to rural communities with less than 250 inhabitants. The inhabitants of such communities exercise their right to participate in the elections of the village council of the neighboring village, which has the right to elect an independent council, or by joining with the neighboring villages to choose the village council common to all these settlements.

=== Section Four ===
The fourth section of the constitution enumerates the procedures of elections. The chapter was modeled after the 1925 Constitution of the RSFSR.

=== Section Five ===
The fifth section of the constitution enumerates the budgeting laws. The budget of the Azerbaijan SSR is included into the state budget of the Transcaucasian SFSR and through it into the unified state budget of the USSR in accordance with the Constitutions of the USSR and the Transcaucasian SFSR and laws issued in accordance with the all-union federal and republican legislations. The distribution of expenses, as well as incomes collected by the territory of the Azerbaijan SSR, to expenses and incomes made in the USSR, Transcaucasian SFSR, and the Azerbaijan SSR budgeting list is confirmed by the legislations of the following entities.

All local revenues and expenditures are consolidated in the local budgets in the order of all-union, federal and republican legislation. In accordance with the legislation of the USSR, the Transcaucasian SFSR and the Azerbaijan SSR, to cover the expenses allocated under these legislations to the funds bt the local government, budgets of local governments are provided with revenue sources from tax and non-tax.

=== Section Six ===
The final chapter of the Constitution is devoted to the description of the emblem and the flag. A characteristic difference between the flag and the emblem of the Azerbaijan SSR is the image of a star and crescent. The section established the seat of the government of the Azerbaijan SSR in Baku.
