= Azerbaijan at the 2022 World Aquatics Championships =

- Flag of Azerbaijan
- FINA code: AZE
- National federation: Azerbaijan Swimming Federation

in Budapest, Hungary
- Competitors: 2 in 1 sport
- Medals: Gold 0 Silver 0 Bronze 0 Total 0

World Aquatics Championships appearances
- 1994; 1998; 2001; 2003; 2005; 2007; 2009; 2011; 2013; 2015; 2017; 2019; 2022; 2023; 2024

Other related appearances
- Soviet Union (1973–1991)

Azerbaijan competed at the 2022 World Aquatics Championships in Budapest, Hungary from 17 June to 3 July.

== Swimming ==
Azerbaijan entered two swimmers.

Men

| Athlete | Event | Heat | | Semifinal | | Final | |
| Athlete | Event | Time | Rank | Time | Rank | Time | Rank |
|---|---|---|---|---|---|---|---|
| Ramil Valizade | 200 m butterfly | 2:02.41 | 36 | did not advance | | | |

Women

| Athlete | Event | Heat | | Semifinal | | Final | |
| Athlete | Event | Time | Rank | Time | Rank | Time | Rank |
|---|---|---|---|---|---|---|---|
| Mariam Sheikhalizadeh | 50 m butterfly | 27.29 | 33 | did not advance | | | |
