= Azerbaijan at the 2013 World Aquatics Championships =

- Flag of Azerbaijan
- FINA code: AZE
- National federation: Azerbaijan Swimming Federation

in Barcelona, Spain
- Competitors: 6 in 2 sports
- Medals: Gold 0 Silver 0 Bronze 0 Total 0

World Aquatics Championships appearances
- 1994; 1998; 2001; 2003; 2005; 2007; 2009; 2011; 2013; 2015; 2017; 2019; 2022; 2023; 2024

Other related appearances
- Soviet Union (1973–1991)

Azerbaijan is competing at the 2013 World Aquatics Championships in Barcelona, Spain between 19 July and 4 August 2013.

== Diving ==
Azerbaijan qualified two quotas for the following diving events.

Men

Athlete	Event	Preliminaries		Final	
Athlete	Event	Points	Rank	Points	Rank
Dmitriy Prosvirinin; Dmitriy Sorokin	3 m synchronized springboard	294.66	19	did not advance	

== Swimming ==
Azerbaijani swimmers achieved qualifying standards in the following events (up to a maximum of 2 swimmers in each event at the A-standard entry time, and 1 at the B-standard):

Men

Athlete	Event	Heat		Semifinal		Final	
Athlete	Event	Time	Rank	Time	Rank	Time	Rank
Boris Kirillov	100 m backstroke	58.17	39	did not advance			
Boris Kirillov	200 m backstroke	2:08.74	31	did not advance			
Yevgeniy Lazuka	50 m butterfly	24.14	29	did not advance			
Yevgeniy Lazuka	100 m butterfly	54.29	35	did not advance			

Women

Athlete	Event	Heat		Semifinal		Final	
Athlete	Event	Time	Rank	Time	Rank	Time	Rank
Elvira Hasanova	100 m backstroke	1:10.47	47	did not advance			
Elvira Hasanova	200 m individual medley	2:30.27	43	did not advance			
Afsana Ismayilova	50 m butterfly	32.29	55	did not advance			
Afsana Ismayilova	100 m butterfly	1:16.58	52	did not advance			

== See also ==
- Azerbaijan at the 2013 UCI Road World Championships
- Azerbaijan at the 2013 World Championships in Athletics
