= Azerbaijan at the 2015 World Aquatics Championships =

- Flag of Azerbaijan
- FINA code: AZE
- National federation: Azerbaijan Swimming Federation

in Kazan, Russia
- Competitors: 4 in 1 sport
- Medals: Gold 0 Silver 0 Bronze 0 Total 0

World Aquatics Championships appearances
- 1994; 1998; 2001; 2003; 2005; 2007; 2009; 2011; 2013; 2015; 2017; 2019; 2022; 2023; 2024

Other related appearances
- Soviet Union (1973–1991)

Azerbaijan qualified for the 2015 World Aquatics Championships in Kazan, Russia held from 24 July to 9 August 2015.

== Swimming ==
Azerbaijani swimmers have achieved qualifying standards in the following events (up to a maximum of 2 swimmers in each event at the A-standard entry time, and 1 at the B-standard):

Men

Athlete	Event	Heat		Semifinal		Final	
Athlete	Event	Time	Rank	Time	Rank	Time	Rank
Boris Kirillov	100 m backstroke	57.50	47	did not advance			
Boris Kirillov	200 m backstroke	2:06.74	34	did not advance			
Anton Zheltyakov	100 m breaststroke	1:04.45	57	did not advance			
Anton Zheltyakov	200 m breaststroke	2:20.83	47	did not advance			

Women

Athlete	Event	Heat		Semifinal		Final	
Athlete	Event	Time	Rank	Time	Rank	Time	Rank
Fatima Alkaramova	50 m freestyle	25.61	32	did not advance			
Fatima Alkaramova	100 m freestyle	1:02.01	=78	did not advance			
Alsu Bayramova	100 m butterfly	1:06.79	59	did not advance			
Alsu Bayramova	200 m butterfly	2:26.27	39	did not advance			

Mixed

Athlete	Event	Heat		Final	
Athlete	Event	Time	Rank	Time	Rank
Boris Kirillov; Anton Zheltyakov; Alsu Bayramova; Fatima Alkaramova	4×100 m medley relay	4:07.93	16	did not advance	
