= 1921 Constitution of the Azerbaijan Socialist Soviet Republic =

1921 Constitution of the Azerbaijan SSR
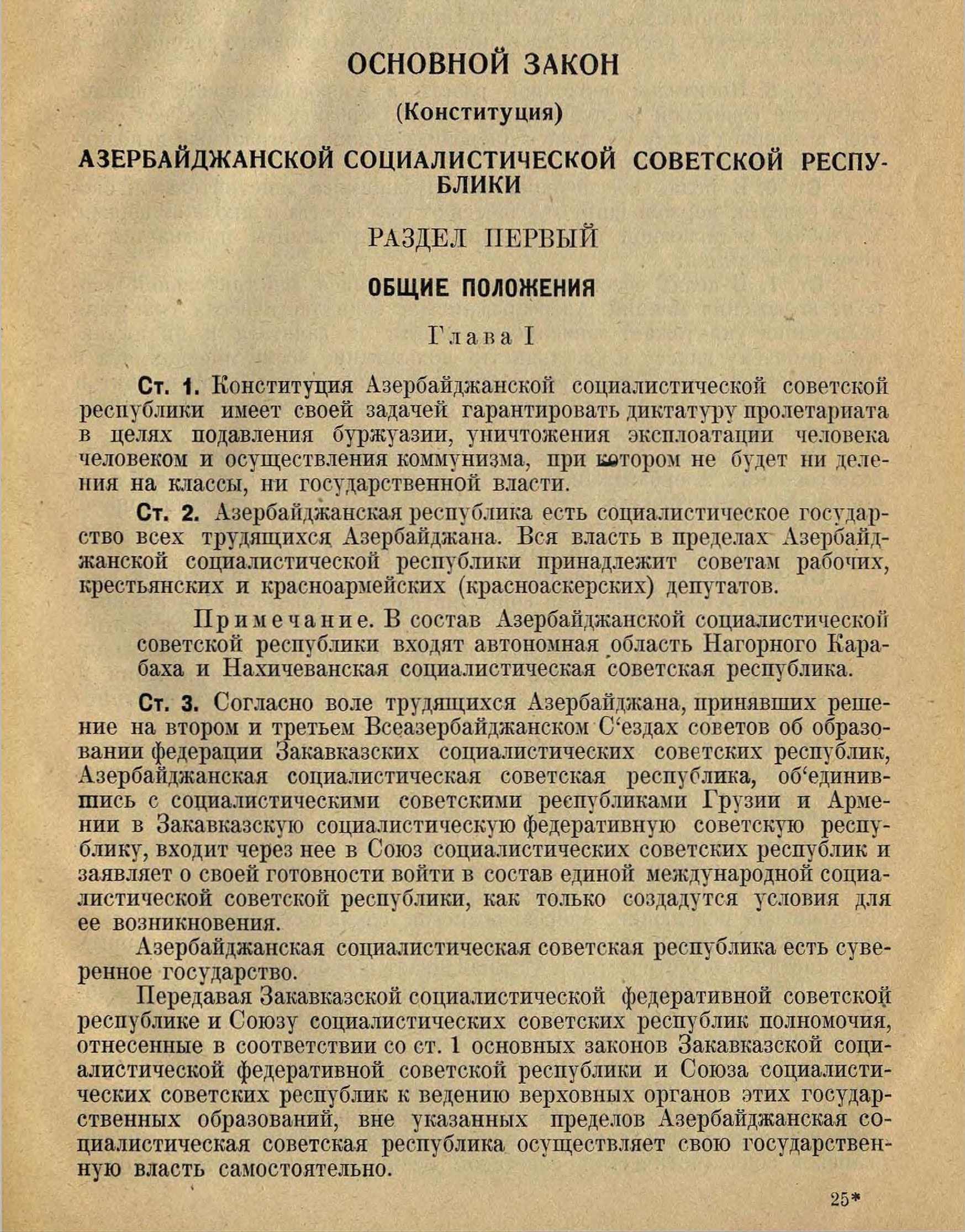
- The first page of the constitution.

Overview
- Original title: Конституция Азербайджанской Социалистической Советской Республики
- Jurisdiction: Azerbaijan Soviet Socialist Republic
- Created: 6 May 1921
- Ratified: 19 May 1921
- Date effective: 19 May 1921
- Last amended: 14 March 1925
- Location: Baku
- Author(s): CEC of Azerbaijan
- Signatories: 9 members of the Presidium of the CEC of Azerbaijan and 3 candidates

The 1921 Constitution of the Azerbaijan Socialist Soviet Republic (Russian: Конституция Азербайджанской Социалистической Советской Республики, Konstitutsiya Azerbaydzhanskoy Sotsialisticheskoy Sovetskoy Respubliki; Azerbaijani: Azərbaycan İctimai Şuralar Cümhuriyyətinin Qonstitusiyasi) was the communist state constitution adopted by the Central Executive Committee of the Azerbaijan SSR at the 1st All-Azerbaijani Congress of Soviets on 19 May 1921. The constitution abolished the Azerbaijan Democratic Republic.

The constitution bears a great resemblance to the 1918 Constitution of the Russian SFSR.

== Background ==
On 6 May 1921, the First All-Azerbaijan Congress of Soviets was convened. The most important issues included in the agenda were the adoption of the Constitution and the formation of the supreme power body. The draft of the first Azerbaijan SSR constitution was discussed during the Congress and was unanimously adopted at 19 May 1921, at the final meeting of the Congress. The Constitution has established that the Soviet system was created in Azerbaijan and that the interests and rights of the workers were protected. The constitution, which defined Azerbaijan as a Soviet Republic, was considered by the Congress as the most democratic political form.

== Structure ==
The Constitution is divided into 5 sections and 15 chapters. The constitution consisted of 104 verses.

=== Section One: General Provisions of the Constitution of the Azerbaijan SSR ===
This sections contains no chapters.

=== Section Two: The Construction of the Soviet Government ===
A. Organization of the Central Government

1. About the Azerbaijan Congress of Soviets
2. About the Central Executive Committee of the Azerbaijan SSR
3. About the Presidium of the Central Executive Committee of the Azerbaijan SSR
4. About the subjects of the Azerbaijani Soviet Congress and the Soviet of the Central Executive Committee of the Azerbaijan SSR
5. About the Council of People's Commissars

B. Organization of the Regional Government

1. About the Soviet Congress
2. About the Soviet Deputies
3. About the Executive Committees
4. About the subjects of management of the Soviet government bodies

=== Section Three: Elections of the Soviet Government ===
1. Active and passive suffrage
2. About the candidates of the election
3. About the validation of elections and on the dismissal of deputies

=== Section Four: Budget Laws ===
This sections contains no chapters.

=== Section Five: About the Flag and the Emblem of the Azerbaijan Socialist Soviet Republic ===
This sections contains no chapters.

== Amendments ==
After the promulgation of the constitution, there were some events that readjusted the status of Azerbaijan SSR. On 1922, Azerbaijan entered two state bodies, the Transcaucasian Soviet Federative Socialist Republic and the USSR. Two years later, the Nakhchivan Autonomous Soviet Socialist Republic was placed under the jurisdiction of the Azerbaijan SSR. Other events are the territorial formation of NKVD in Azerbaijan, the renewal of the structure and activities of a number of state bodies, private law enforcement agencies, the administrative-territorial division of the republic, as well as the structure of the state apparatus. Prompted by the events, the government of the Azerbaijan SSR adopted several amendments to the constitution on March 14, 1925.

== Provisions ==
=== Basic Rights ===
Freedom of speech and press, meetings, rallies, street freedoms, freedom of conscience, equality of rights regardless of national, racial or religious affiliation, right to association in public organizations, free, general and compulsory education right were included in this Constitution. Along with the granting of rights and freedoms and their enforcement, the Constitution imposed certain obligations on citizens. Employment was an important task.

=== Election ===
While the constitution defines equality, some categories of individuals have deprived the right to vote.

=== Central Executive Committee ===
The constitution defines the main principles of the organization and functioning of the state apparatus. The organization and operation of the higher authorities and governing bodies of Azerbaijan, as well as the local state authorities, were detailed. The first Constitution of Azerbaijan defines the All-Azerbaijani Congress of Soviets (Azerbaijani: Ümumazərbaycan Sovetlər Qurultayı), the Central Executive Committee of the Azerbaijan SSR (Azerbaijani: Azərbaycan Mərkəzi İcraiyyə Komitəsi) and the Presidium of the CEC of Azerbaijan SSR (Azerbaijani: Azərbaycan Mərkəzi İcraiyyə Komitəsin Rəyasət) as the supreme state power bodies of the republic. According to the Constitution, these bodies exercise full state power, ensuring its supremacy and independence. Among the Supreme Authorities, the Workers' Council of the Soviet Union occupied an important place among the working class deputies.

During the All-Azerbaijani Congress of Soviets, the authority was held by the Central Executive Committee (CEC) of the Azerbaijan SSR. The CEC must convene at least once every two months.

The composition of the Central Executive Committee of the Azerbaijan SSR commissions changed after Azerbaijan was incorporated into the Transcaucasian SFSR and the USSR and the relevant changes in the authority of the republic. External affairs, defense, and foreign trade issues were excluded from the exclusive competence of the USSR, and foreign and marine maritime commissions were abolished, and the Commission for Foreign and Domestic Trade was renamed to the Commission for Commerce Affairs.

On the sessions of the Central Executive Committee, the supreme state power body was the Presidium of the Central Executive Committee. The composition included the chairman, secretary and members of the Central Executive Committee. Later, in addition to standing members, the Central Executive Committee's Presidium included the Nakhchivan Autonomous Republic Council of Ministers and the Chairman of the Regional Executive Committee of the Nakhchivan Autonomous Republic, the chairman of the Baku Council and the Chairman of the Emergency Committee.

=== Council of People's Commissars ===
The implementation of the constitution and the management of general affairs of the Azerbaijan SSR was handed over to the Council of People's Commissars (Azerbaijani: Xalq Komissarları Sovetinə). The members of the Council of People's Commissars was elected by the Central Executive Committee. The council consisted of the chairman, deputy, and the people commissars. In the following years, the composition of the government expanded.
