= Azerbaijan at the 2017 World Aquatics Championships =

- Flag of Azerbaijan
- FINA code: AZE
- National federation: Azerbaijan Swimming Federation

in Budapest, Hungary
- Competitors: 2 in 2 sports
- Medals: Gold 0 Silver 0 Bronze 0 Total 0

World Aquatics Championships appearances
- 1994; 1998; 2001; 2003; 2005; 2007; 2009; 2011; 2013; 2015; 2017; 2019; 2022; 2023; 2024

Other related appearances
- Soviet Union (1973–1991)

Azerbaijan is scheduled to compete at the 2017 World Aquatics Championships in Budapest, Hungary from 14 July to 30 July.

== Open water swimming ==
Azerbaijan has entered one open water swimmer

Athlete	Event	Time	Rank
Anna Jaeger	Women's 5 km	OTL	

== Swimming ==
Azerbaijan has received a Universality invitation from FINA to send a male swimmer to the World Championships.

Athlete	Event	Heat		Semifinal		Final	
Athlete	Event	Time	Rank	Time	Rank	Time	Rank
Boris Kirillov	Men's 100 m backstroke	1:00.07	42	did not advance			
Boris Kirillov	Men's 200 m backstroke	2:09.22	38	did not advance			
