= Flag of the Azerbaijan Soviet Socialist Republic =

Azerbaijan Soviet Socialist Republic
- Use: Civil and state flag, civil and state ensign
- Proportion: 1:2
- Adopted: 7 October 1952; 5 May 1956 (specified details)
- Relinquished: 5 February 1991
- Design: A plain red flag with a golden hammer and sickle and a gold-bordered red star in its upper canton and a horizontal blue band on the bottom fourth.
- Designed by: K.M.A. Qasimzadə
- Reverse flag
- Use: Civil and state flag, civil and state ensign
- Azerbaijani: Azərbaycan (Азәрбајҹан)
- Flag of the Azerbaijan SSR (1991) and the Republic of Azerbaijan (1991–)
- Use: National flag and ensign
- Proportion: 1:2
- Adopted: 5 February 1991
- Relinquished: 22 October 2013
- Design: A horizontal tricolor of bright blue, red, and green, with a white crescent and an eight-pointed star centred on a red band.
- Designed by: Ali bey Huseynzade

The flag of the Azerbaijan Soviet Socialist Republic (Note: Azerbaijani: Азәрбајҹан Совет Сосиалист Республикасынын бајрағы, romanized: Azərbaycan Sovet Sosialist Respublikasının bayrağı; Russian: Флаг Азербайджанской Советской Социалистической Республики) was a plain red flag with a golden hammer and sickle and a gold-bordered red star in its upper canton and an horizontal dark blue band on the bottom fourth, representing the Caspian Sea.

The last version of the flag of the Azerbaijan SSR was firstly introduced by K.M.A. Kyazimzade, director of the Azerbaijan State Museum of Art, and was officially adopted as national flag by the decree of the Presidium of the Supreme Soviet of the Azerbaijan SSR on 7 October 1952. Definition was as follows:

The national flag of the Azerbaijan Soviet Socialist Republic is a panel consisting of two horizontal bands of color: the upper red part of three quarters of the width and the bottom is blue, nearly one quarter the width of the flag with the image on the top left corner of the red band, at the flagpole and gold hammer and sickle, and above them a red five-pointed star framed by gold fringe. The ratio of width to length is 1:2.

The text of national flag in the Constitution of the Azerbaijan SSR was updated on 18 August 1953. However, the text didn't specify the proportion of the hammer and sickle. On 5 May 1956, the Presidium of the Supreme Soviet of the Azerbaijan SSR approved the "Regulations on the State flag of the Azerbaijan Soviet Socialist Republic", which further regulated the details of the elements on the flag. On 16 March 1981, the Presidium of the Supreme Soviet of the Azerbaijan SSR further issued a decree specify that no hammer and sickle should be printed on the reverse side of the flag.

== Color scheme ==
Colors scheme	Blue	Red	Yellow
CMYK	100-68-0-39	0-100-100-19	0-15-100-0
HEX	#00309A	#CE0000	#FFD800
RGB	0-38-154	206-0-0	255-216-0

== History ==
From the second part of 1921 to 1922, the Azerbaijan SSR used a red flag with the yellow Cyrillic characters АССР (ASSR). On 12 March 1922, the Azerbaijan SSR united with the Georgian SSR and the Armenian SSR under the Transcaucasian SFSR (TSFSR), that was split again into these three republics in 1936.

1920

1920–1921

1921–1922

1922–1924

In 1937, a golden hammer and sickle was added in the top left-hand corner, with beneath the Latin characters AzSSR in a serif font in place of the Cyrillic characters. A third version was issued in 1940s, and had AzSSR substituted by its Cyrillic version АзССР.

The last version of the flag was adopted by the Azerbaijan SSR on 7 October 1952. It was the flag of the Soviet Union, with a horizontal blue band on the bottom fourth. The 1952 flag was discarded on 5 February 1991, when the flag of the Azerbaijan SSR based on the Azerbaijan Democratic Republic was re-introduced.

1924-1927

1927-1931

1931-1937

1937–1940

1940–1952

1952–1956 (early variant)

1952–1991

1991, as flag of the Republic of Azerbaijan

== Nakhichevan ASSR ==
Flag of the Nakhichevan ASSR (1978–1990)

Flag of the Nakhichevan ASSR (1956–1978)

Flag of the Nakhichevan ASSR (1945–1953)

Flag of the Nakhichevan ASSR (1940–1945)

Flag of the Nakhichevan ASSR (1939–1940)

Flag of the Nakhichevan ASSR (1937–1939)

Flag of the Nakhichevan ASSR (1921–1925)

The flag of the Nakhichevan Autonomous Soviet Socialist Republic is identical to the Azerbaijan SSR flag, but with "Нахчыван МССР" (Нахчыван Мухтар Совет Сосиалист Республикасы; Naxçıvan Muxtar Sovet Sosialist Respublikası) inscribed on it.

== See also ==
- Flag of the Soviet Union
- Flag of Azerbaijan
- Emblem of the Azerbaijan Soviet Socialist Republic
