= Azerbaijan at the 2019 World Aquatics Championships =

- Flag of Azerbaijan
- FINA code: AZE
- National federation: Azerbaijan Swimming Federation

in Gwangju, South Korea
- Medals: Gold 0 Silver 0 Bronze 0 Total 0

World Aquatics Championships appearances
- 1994; 1998; 2001; 2003; 2005; 2007; 2009; 2011; 2013; 2015; 2017; 2019; 2022; 2023; 2024

Other related appearances
- Soviet Union (1973–1991)

Azerbaijan competed at the 2019 World Aquatics Championships in Gwangju, South Korea from 12 to 28 July.

== Swimming ==
Azerbaijan entered one swimmer.

Men

Athlete	Event	Heat		Semifinal		Final	
Athlete	Event	Time	Rank	Time	Rank	Time	Rank
Maksym Shemberev	200 m butterfly	1:57.14	16 Q	1:56.78	12	did not advance	
Maksym Shemberev	400 m individual medley	4:14.62	6 Q	—		4:14.10	6
