= Nakhichevan Autonomous Soviet Socialist Republic =

Autonomous republic in the Azerbaijan SSR

Nakhichevan Autonomous Soviet Socialist Republic Нахчыван Мухтар Совет Сосиалист Республикасы (Azerbaijani) Нахичеванская Автономная Советская Социалистическая Республика (Russian)
- ASSR of the Azerbaijan SSR
- 1921–1990
- Flag (1978–1990) Emblem (1978–1990)

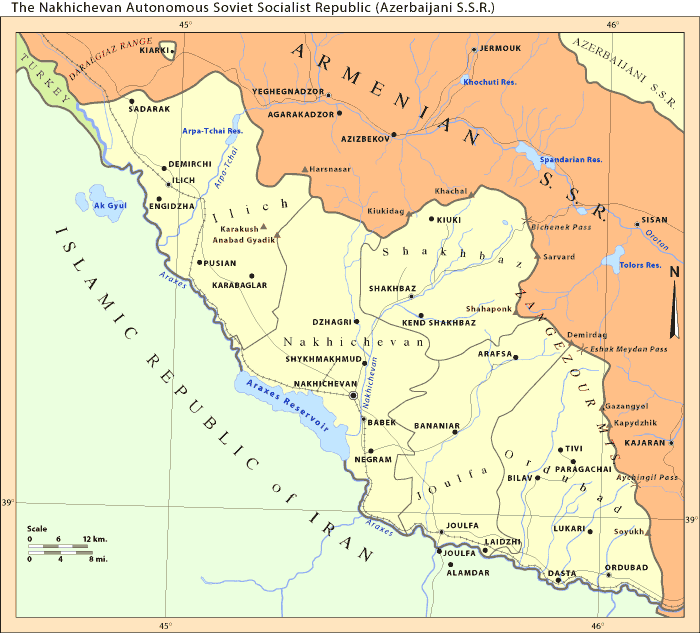
- Location of the Nakhichevan ASSR between Iran and the Armenian SSR
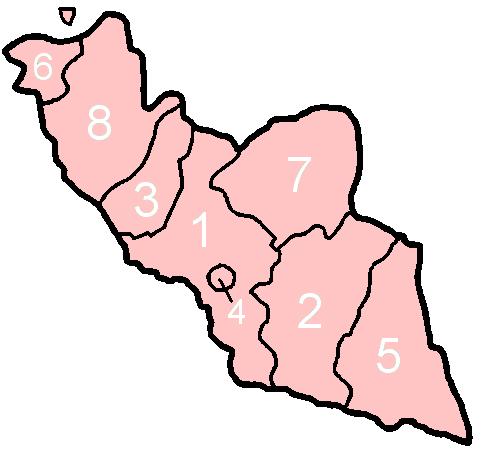
- Modern subdivisions of the Nakhchivan Autonomous Republic
- Capital: Nakhichevan
- Area
  - Coordinates: 39°12′N 45°24′E
- Government
  - Type: Autonomous Soviet Socialist Republic
  - Motto: Proletarians of all regions, unite!
- Historical era: 20th century
  - Soviet Republic of Nakhichevan established^{a}: July 1920
  - Nakhichevan ASSR established: 16 March 1921
  - Treaty of Kars: 13 October 1921
  - Transcaucasian SFSR: 1922–36
  - Transferred to the Azerbaijan SSR: 9 February 1924
  - Independence declared: 19 January 1990
  - End of Independence: 27 January 1990
  - Nakhchivan Autonomous Republic: 19 November 1990
Preceded by	Succeeded by
Azerbaijan Democratic Republic	Nakhchivan Autonomous Republic
- Today part of: Azerbaijan
- a. Whilst the 11th Soviet Red Army occupied land under de facto control of the Democratic Republic of Armenia in 1920, the territory was theoretically under British occupation (replacing Ottoman occupation). De jure, the former Nakhichevan Khanate had passed to the Russian Empire after the 1828 Treaty of Turkmenchay, while the Transcaucasian Democratic Federative Republic had been replaced by competing claims from the Democratic Republic of Armenia and the Azerbaijan Democratic Republic. In addition, the Azeri Republic of Aras had also declared Nakhichevan as its territory.

The Nakhichevan Autonomous Soviet Socialist Republic, (Note: Azerbaijani: Нахчыван Мухтар Совет Сосиалист Республикасы Naxçıvan Muxtar Sovet Sosialist Respublikası, Armenian: Նախիջևանի Ինքնավար Խորհրդային Սոցիալիստական Հանրապետություն, Russian: Нахичеванская Автономная Советская Социалистическая Республика, romanized: Nakhichevanskaya Avtonomnaya Sovetskaya Sotsialisticheskaya Respublika) abbreviated as the Nakhichevan ASSR (Note: Azerbaijani: Нахчыван МССР, Armenian: Նախիջևանի ԻԽՍՀ, Russian: Нахичеванская АССР) was an autonomous republic within the Azerbaijan SSR, itself a republic within the Soviet Union. It was formed on 16 March 1921 and became a part of the Azerbaijan SSR proper on 9 February 1924.

The first flag of the Nakhichevan ASSR was introduced in 1937 and contained both Azerbaijani and Armenian text. In the 1940s, when the Azerbaijani Latin alphabet was being replaced by Cyrillic, the previous flag was replaced by a Soviet flag with the Azerbaijani Cyrillic text "Нахчыван МССР" in gold and a dark blue bar along the fess.

In 1990, it became the Nakhichevan Autonomous Republic within the Republic of Azerbaijan.

== History ==
=== War and revolution ===
In the final years of World War I, Nakhichevan was the scene of bloodshed between Armenians and Azerbaijanis, who both laid claim to the area. By 1914, the Armenian population had decreased slightly to 40% while the Azeri population increased to roughly 60%. After the February Revolution of 1917, the region was placed under the authority of the Special Transcaucasian Committee of the Russian Provisional Government and subsequently the short-lived Transcaucasian Democratic Federative Republic (TDFR) in 1918. When the TDFR was dissolved in May 1918, Nakhichevan, Nagorno-Karabakh, Zangezur (today the Armenian province of Syunik and part of the province of Vayots Dzor), and Qazakh were heavily contested between the newly formed and short-lived states of the Democratic Republic of Armenia (DRA) and the Azerbaijan Democratic Republic (ADR). In June 1918, the region came under Ottoman occupation. The Ottomans proceeded to massacre 10,000 Armenians and razed 45 of their villages to the ground. Under the terms of the Armistice of Mudros, the Ottomans agreed to pull their troops out of the Transcaucasus to make way for the forthcoming British military presence.

Under British occupation, Sir Oliver Wardrop, British Chief Commissioner in the South Caucasus, made a border proposal to solve the conflict. According to Wardrop, Armenian claims against Azerbaijan should not go beyond the administrative borders of the former Erivan Governorate (which under prior Imperial Russian rule encompassed Nakhichevan), while Azerbaijan was to be limited to the governorates of Baku and Elisabethpol. This proposal was rejected by both Armenians (who did not wish to give up their claims to Qazakh, Zangezur and Nagorno-Karabakh) and Azeris (who found it unacceptable to give up their claims to Nakhichevan). As disputes between both countries continued, it soon became apparent that the fragile peace under British occupation would not last.

In December 1918, with the support of Azerbaijan's Musavat Party, Jafargulu Khan Nakhichevanski declared the Republic of Aras in the Nakhichevan uyezd of the former Erivan Governorate assigned to Armenia by Wardrop. The Armenian government did not recognize the new state and sent its troops into the region to take control of it. The conflict soon erupted into the violent Aras War. British journalist C.E. Bechhofer described the situation in April 1920:

You cannot persuade a party of frenzied nationalists that two blacks do not make a white; consequently, no day went by without a catalogue of complaints from both sides, Armenians and Tartars [Azeris], of unprovoked attacks, murders, village burnings and the like. Specifically, the situation was a series of vicious cycles.

By mid-June 1919, Armenia had established control over Nakhichevan and the whole territory of the self-proclaimed republic. The fall of the Aras republic triggered an invasion by the regular Azerbaijani army and by the end of July, Armenian troops were forced to leave Nakhichevan City to the Azeris. Again more violence erupted, leaving some 10,000 Armenians dead and 45 Armenian villages destroyed. Meanwhile, feeling the situation to be hopeless and unable to maintain any control over the area, the British decided to withdraw from the region in mid-1919. Still, fighting between Armenians and Azeris continued and after a series of skirmishes that took place throughout the Nakhichevan district, a ceasefire was agreed. This lasted only briefly, and by early March 1920, more fighting broke out, primarily in Karabakh between Karabakh Armenians and Azerbaijan's regular army. This triggered conflicts in other areas with mixed populations, including Nakhichevan.

=== Sovietization ===
In July 1920, the 11th Soviet Red Army invaded and occupied the region and on 28 July, declared the Nakhichevan Autonomous Soviet Socialist Republic with "close ties" to the Azerbaijan SSR. In November, on the verge of taking over Armenia, the Bolsheviks, in order to attract public support, promised they would allot Nakhichevan to Armenia, along with Karabakh and Zangezur. This was fulfilled when Nariman Narimanov, leader of Bolshevik Azerbaijan issued a declaration celebrating the "victory of Soviet power in Armenia," proclaimed that both Nakhichevan and Zangezur should be awarded to the Armenian people as a sign of the Azerbaijani people's support for Armenia's fight against the former DRA government:

As of today, the old frontiers between Armenia and Azerbaijan are declared to be non-existent. Mountainous Karabakh, Zangezur and Nakhchivan are recognised to be integral parts of the Socialist Republic of Armenia.

Vladimir Lenin, although welcoming this act of "great Soviet fraternity" where "boundaries had no meaning among the family of Soviet peoples," did not agree with the motion and instead called for the people of Nakhichevan to be consulted in a referendum. According to the formal figures of this referendum, held at the beginning of 1921, 90% of Nakhichevan's population wanted to be included in the Azerbaijan SSR "with the rights of an autonomous republic." The decision to make Nakhichevan a part of modern-day Azerbaijan was cemented 16 March 1921 in the Treaty of Moscow between Bolshevist Russia and Turkey. The agreement between Soviet Russia and Turkey also called for attachment of the former Sharur-Daralagez uyezd (which had a solid Azeri majority) to Nakhichevan, thus allowing Turkey to share a border with the Azerbaijan SSR. This deal was reaffirmed on 23 October, in the Treaty of Kars. Article V of the treaty stated the following:

The Turkish Government and the Soviet Governments of Armenia and Azerbaijan are agreed that the region of Nakhchivan, within the limits specified by Annex III to the present Treaty, constitutes an autonomous territory under the protection of Azerbaijan.

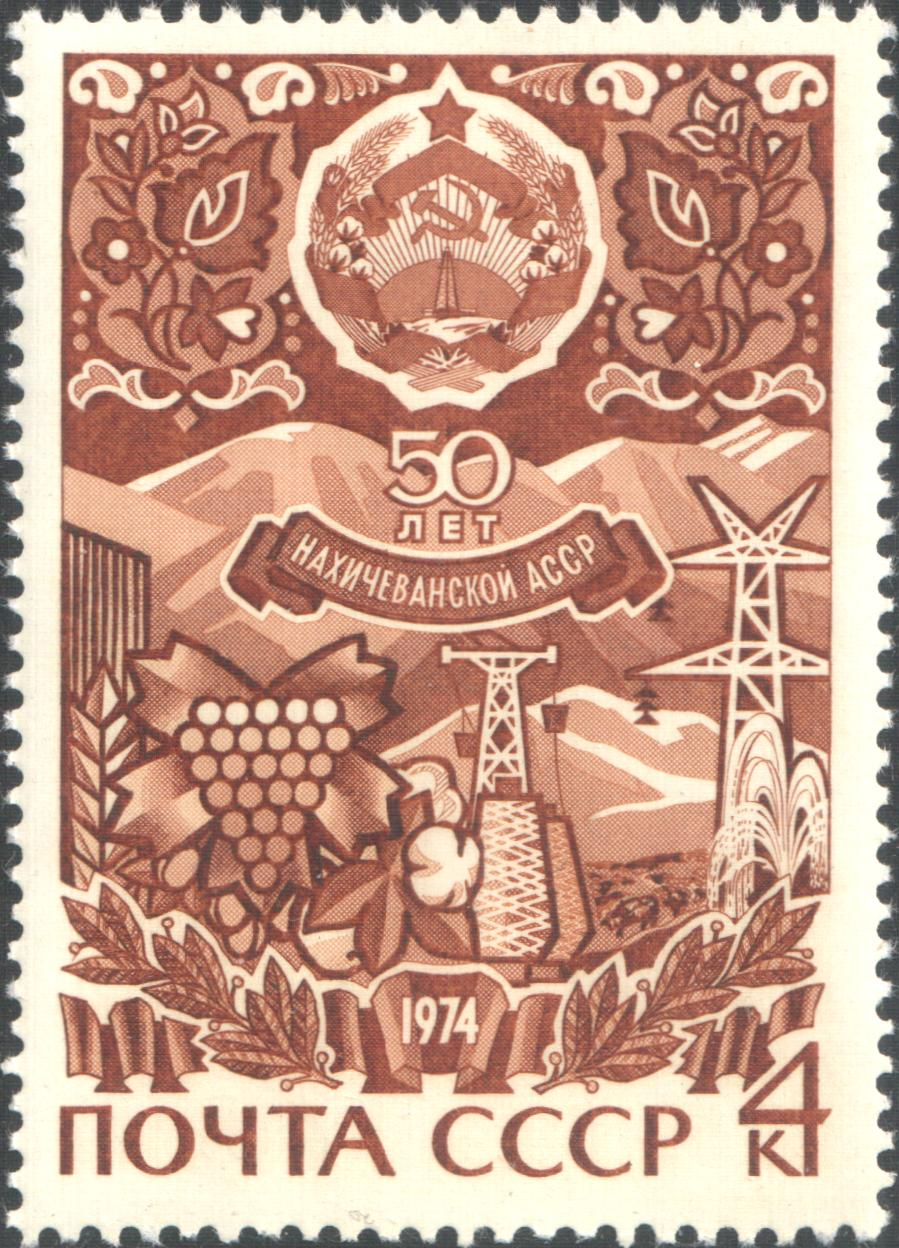
Soviet postage stamp featuring Nakhichevan, 1974

So, on 16 March 1921 the Nakhichevan ASSR was established. On 9 February 1924, the Soviet Union officially placed the Nakhichevan ASSR under the jurisdiction of the Azerbaijan SSR. Its constitution was adopted on 18 April 1926.

=== Soviet Union ===
As a constituent part of the Soviet Union, tensions lessened over the ethnic composition of Nakhichevan or any territorial claims regarding it. Instead, it became an important point of industrial production with particular emphasis on the mining of minerals such as salt. Under Soviet rule, it was once a major junction on the Moscow–Tehran railway line as well as the Baku–Yerevan railway. It also served as an important strategic area during the Cold War, sharing borders with both Turkey (a NATO member state) and Iran (a close ally of the West until the Iranian Revolution of 1979).

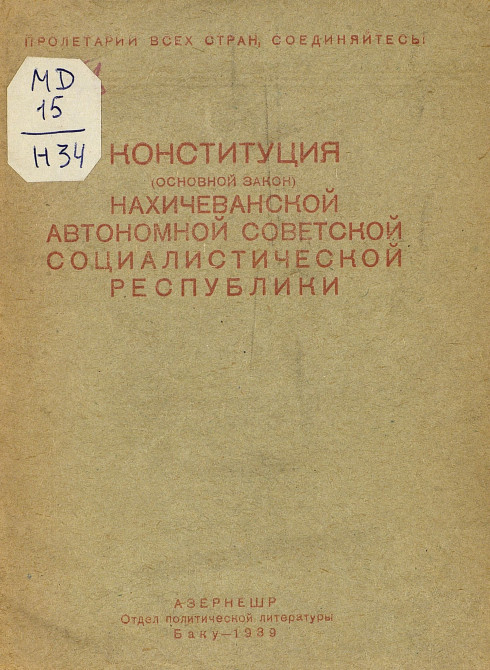
Cover of the Constitution of the Nakhichevan ASSR of 1938 in Russian.

Facilities improved during Soviet times; education and public health especially began to see some major changes. In 1913, Nakhichevan only had two hospitals with a total of 20 beds. The region was plagued by widespread diseases including trachoma and typhus. Malaria, which mostly came from the adjoining Aras River, brought serious harm to the region. At any one time, between 70% and 85% of Nakhichevan's population was infected with malaria, and in the region of Norashen (present-day Sharur) almost 100% were struck with the disease. This situation improved dramatically under Soviet rule. Malaria was sharply reduced and trachoma, typhus, and relapsing fever were eliminated.

During the Soviet era, Nakhichevan saw a significant demographic shift. Its Armenian population gradually decreased as many emigrated to the Armenian SSR. In 1926, 15% of region's population was Armenian, but by 1979, this number had shrunk to 1.4%. The Azeri population, meanwhile increased substantially with both a higher birth rate and immigration from Armenia (going from 85% in 1926 to 96% by 1979).

Armenians in Nagorno-Karabakh noted similar though slower demographic trends and feared an eventual "de-Armenianization" of the area. When tensions between Armenians and Azeris were reignited in the late-1980s by the Nagorno-Karabakh conflict, Azerbaijan's Popular Front managed to pressure the Azerbaijan SSR to instigate a partial railway and air blockade against Armenia, while another reason for the disruption of rail service to Armenia were attacks of Armenian forces on the trains entering the Armenian territory from Azerbaijan, which resulted in railroad personnel refusing to enter Armenia. This effectively crippled Armenia's economy, as 85% of the cargo and goods arrived through rail traffic. In response, Armenia closed the railway to Nakhichevan, thereby strangling the exclave's only link to the rest of the Soviet Union.

Administrative map of the Caucasus in the USSR, 1957–1991

December 1989 saw unrest in Nakhichevan as its Azeri inhabitants moved to physically dismantle the Soviet border with Iran to flee the area and meet their ethnic Azeri cousins in northern Iran. This action was angrily denounced by the Soviet leadership and the Soviet media accused the Azeris of "embracing Islamic fundamentalism". In January 1990, the Supreme Soviet of the Nakhichevan ASSR issued a declaration stating the intention for Nakhichevan to secede from the USSR to protest the Soviet Union's actions during Black January. It was the first part of the Soviet Union to declare independence, preceding Lithuania's declaration by almost 2 months.

Heydar Aliyev, the future president of Azerbaijan, returned to his birthplace of Nakhichevan in autumn 1990, after being ousted from his position in the Politburo by Mikhail Gorbachev in 1987. Soon after returning to Nakhichevan, Aliyev was elected to the local Supreme Soviet by an overwhelming majority. Aliyev subsequently resigned from the CPSU and after the failed August 1991 coup against Gorbachev, he called for complete independence for Azerbaijan and denounced Ayaz Mütallibov for supporting the coup. In late 1991, Aliyev consolidated his power base as chairman of the Nakhichevan Supreme Soviet and asserted Nakhichevan's near-total independence from Baku.

On 19 November 1990, it became the Nakhichevan Autonomous Republic within the Republic of Azerbaijan.

== Commemoration ==
In 2008, the National Bank of Azerbaijan minted a pair of gold and silver commemorative coins for the 85th anniversary of the creation of the Nakhichevan Autonomous Soviet Socialist Republic.

== See also ==
- Nakhichevan Regional Committee of the Azerbaijan Communist Party
