= The Land of Fire =

Adopted motto of Azerbaijan

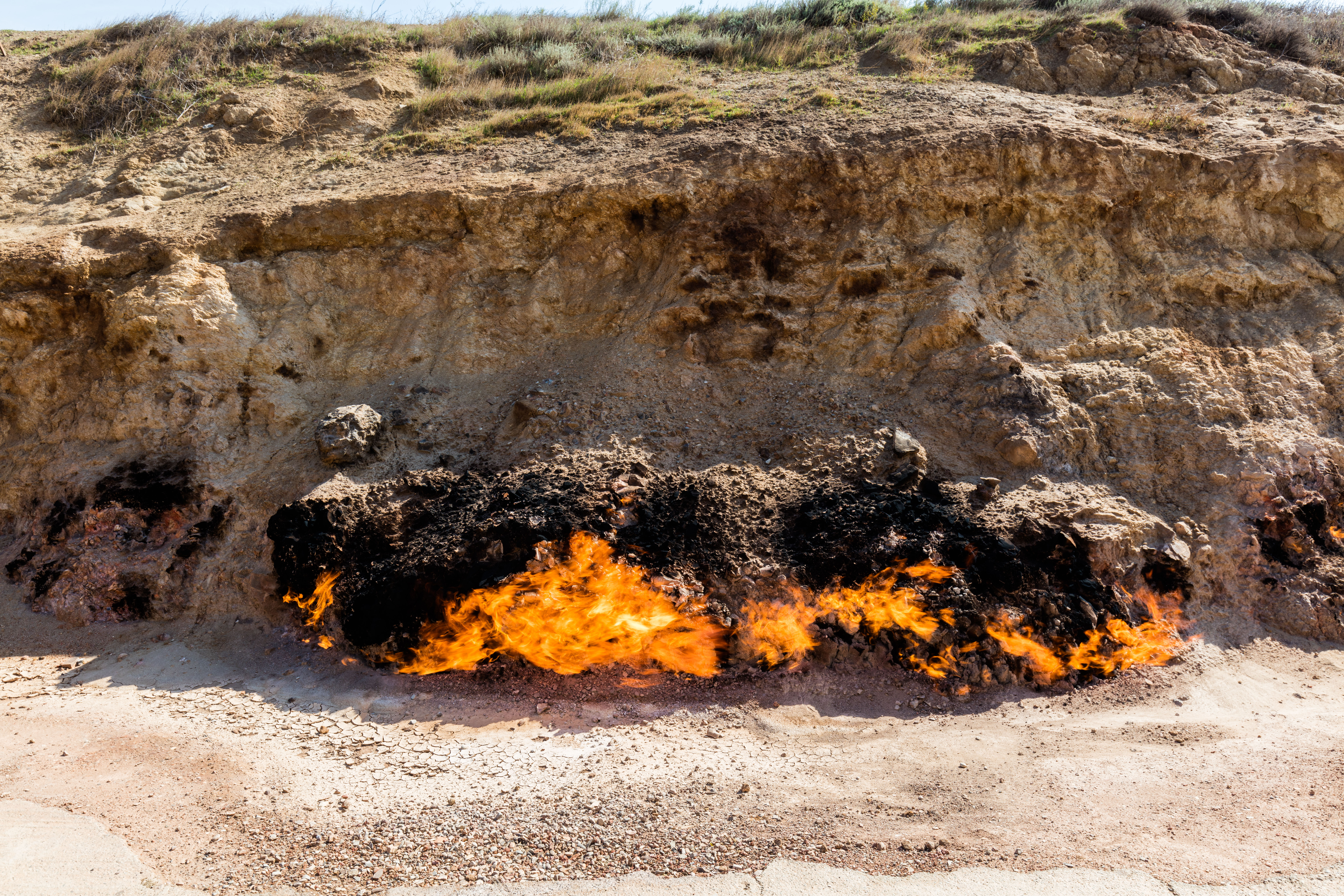
Natural gas fires in Yanar Dag, Baku, Azerbaijan

The Land of Fire (Azerbaijani: Odlar Yurdu, IPA: [odˈɫɑɾ jʊɾˈdu]) is the adopted motto of Azerbaijan.

== Historical and political development ==
The etymology of the phrase is thought to be related to Atropates, who ruled over the region of Atropatene (present Iranian Azerbaijan). The name "Atropates" itself is the Greek transliteration of an Old Iranian, probably Median, compounded name with the meaning "Protected by the (Holy) Fire" or "The Land of the (Holy) Fire". The Greek name is mentioned by Diodorus Siculus and Strabo. Over the span of millennia the name evolved to Āturpātākān then to Ādharbādhagān, Ādharbāyagān, Āzarbāydjān and present-day Azerbaijan. The word is translatable as "The Guardian" of fire or "The Land of the Fire" in Modern Persian.

Some critics have argued that the phrase is a reference either to the natural burning of surface oil deposits or to the oil-fueled fires in temples of the once-dominant Zoroastrianism.

The symbolism of the term has been widely used in most fields, such as in heraldry, the shield in National emblem of Azerbaijan contains the image of a fire in the center of an eight-point star against a background of the colors of the Azerbaijani flag.

== Promotional usage ==
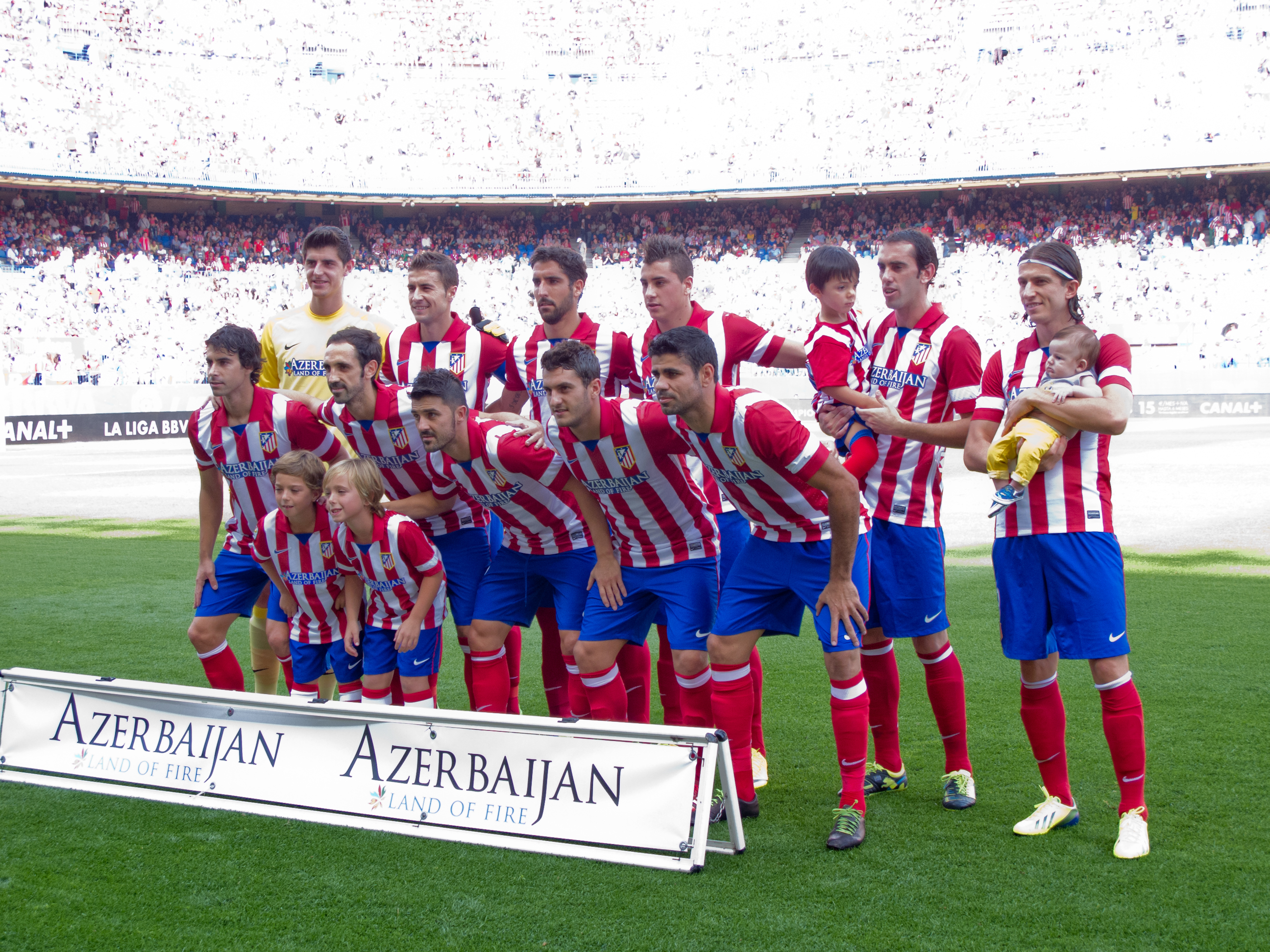
Atlético players with kits stating "Azerbaijan Land of Fire"

After Azerbaijan's independence from Soviet Union, the phrase was used as a touristic campaign to promote the country as a tourist destination and as a location for industry. The phrase appeared in many touristic promotions, the most notable on Atlético Madrid's shirts between the 2012–13 and 2013–14 seasons. In 2014, the phrase appeared on Sheffield Wednesday and Lens shirts after the clubs' promised but subsequently cancelled takeover by Azerbaijani businessman Hafiz Mammadov.

The motto "Light your fire!", used to promote the Eurovision Song Contest 2012, which was held in Baku, was based on the "Land of Fire" concept.

== Russian calques ==
The "Land of Flames" expression was used as a literary expression denoting Azerbaijan in the Russian language Strana Ogney (Страна Огней, i.e. "Country of the Fires").

== See also ==
- Tianxia
- Tierra del Fuego
