= Emblem of the Azerbaijan Soviet Socialist Republic =

- Armiger: Azerbaijan Soviet Socialist Republic
- Adopted: 14 March 1937; Current version on 21 April 1978
- Crest: Red star
- Supporters: Wheat and Cotton
- Motto: Бүтүн өлкəлəрин пролетарлары, бирлəшин! (Azeri); Пролетарии всех стран, соединяйтесь! (Russian) "Workers of the world, unite!"
- Earlier version(s): 1921, 1927, and 1931

The emblem of the Azerbaijan Soviet Socialist Republic was adopted in 1937 by the government of the Azerbaijan Soviet Socialist Republic. The style is based on the emblem of the Soviet Union.

The emblem features a drilling rig representing Baku's abundant oil reservoirs and, behind it, a sunrise, representing the future of the Azeri nation. The hammer and sickle are prominently featured above it while the red star (symbolizing "socialism on all five continents") sits at the top of the emblem, for the victory of Communism and the "world-wide socialist community of states". The outer rim features symbols of agriculture – wheat and cotton.

The slogan on the banner bears the Soviet Union state motto ("Workers of the world, unite!") in both the Russian and Azerbaijani languages. In Azerbaijani, it is "Бүтүн өлкəлəрин пролетарлары, бирлəшин!" (Bütün ölkələrin proletarları, birləşin!).

The full name of the Azerbaijan Soviet Socialist Republic is spelled out in both in the Russian and Azeri languages.

The present emblem was used from 1918 later restored in 1992 prior to independence, with some components of the previous Soviet embroidery were retained, in this case, wheat and the red colour.

== History ==
=== Early emblems of the Azerbaijan SSR ===
On the first banknotes of the Azerbaijan SSR, issued in 1920, there appeared a composition consisting of a crossed sickle and hammer, a 5-terminal star and a crescent moon, which often consisted of a wreath of ears.

The same composition was included in the Order of the Red Banner of the Azerbaijan SSR, approved in 1920, the draft of which was developed by the head of the military topographical department of the operational mobilization department of the staff of the People's Commissar for Military and Naval Affairs of the AzSSR, I.P. Vekilov, in the image and likeness of the Order of Red Banner of the RSFSR.

This composition was fixed in the Constitution of the Azerbaijan Socialist Soviet Republic adopted on 19 May 1921 by the First Congress of Soviets of Azerbaijan, which established the description of the coat of arms, copied from the description of the emblem of the RSFSR in its Constitution of 1918, article 103:

The coat of arms of the Azerbaijan Socialist Soviet Republic consists of images on a red background in the sunlight of a golden sickle and hammer, placed crosswise with handles downwards, and a crescent with a five-pointed star surrounded by a wreath of ears with the inscription:

a) "Azerbaijan Socialist Soviet Republic" and

b) "Workers of all countries, unite!".

— Constitution of the Azerbaijan Socialist Soviet Republic, article 103

Apparently, there was no consensus about the depiction on the exact image of the emblem. Various compositions were created instead. The most popular one includes a sickle, a hammer, a crescent, and a 5-pointed star, most often in a wreath of ears, and the inscriptions were written with Arabic letters.

In particular, such composition was depicted on all postage stamps of the Azerbaijan SSR, which were in circulation since 1 October 1921. The author of the drawings was the Baku satirist Beno (Benedikt) Rafailovich Telingater.

After 13 December 1922, the CEC of the Azerbaijan SSR became part of the Transcaucasian SFSR, which formed on 30 December 1922, and together with the RSFSR, the Ukrainian SSR and the Byelorussian SSR became the USSR. The usage of the composition for symbolizing the Azerbaijani SSR reduced, due to being replaced by the emblem of USSR and Transcaucasian SFSR.

=== Transition to Latin alphabet ===
On 30 December 1922, the Central Executive Committee of the Azerbaijani SSR adopted a decree on the equality of the Latin alphabet with the Arabic letters. The change was reflected in the description of the emblem in the new Constitution of the Azerbaijani SSR adopted on 8 December 1924, which was approved on 14 March 1925. On the new constitution, the words "in the new and old alphabets" were added to the description of the emblem.

=== First emblem ===
In the second revision of the new Constitution of Azerbaijan (approved by the All-Azerbaijan Congress of Soviets on 26 March 1927), the coat of arms is described as follows:

The coat of arms of the Azerbaijan Socialist Soviet Republic consists of images on a red ground in the sun's rays of a golden sickle and hammer, crisscrossed, handles down and a half-moon with a five-pointed star surrounded by a wreath of ears, with the inscription:
a) The Azerbaijan Socialist Soviet Republic.
b) Workers of all countries, unite!

— Constitution of Azerbaijan SSR, Article 99

After this revision, the official versions of the emblems had appeared.

On 1 January 1929, by the resolution of the CEC of the Azerbaijani SSR, the Latin alphabet was declared the official script of Azerbaijan SSR. This resulted in the words "and the old" were removed from the description of the emblem in the Constitution of the Azerbaijan SSR.

=== Second emblem ===
Since 1930, in the emblem of the Azerbaijan SSR, the inscriptions were written only using the Latin alphabet. This was fixed in the new version of the Constitution of the Azerbaijani SSR, which was adopted on 14 February 1931 by the VII All-Azerbaijan Congress of Soviets, which established a new description of the coat of arms of the Azerbaijan SSR. The description was as following:

The State Emblem of the Azerbaijan Socialist Soviet Republic consists of images on a light red (pale) background, bordered by a white circle, in the rays of the rising sun, in the middle of the emblem - a sickle and a hammer, placed cross-on-the-cross with handles downwards, and above them a crescent with a five-pointed star, surrounded by a wreath of ears.

Images of sickle and hammer, crescent with a star, sun with rays, and a crown of ears - golden color. In a wreath on both sides, there are four spikes of wheat. In the lower part of the emblem against the backdrop of the rising sun are depicted in three colors: black, white and gray, on the left side of the oil field - seven oil rigs and two kerosene tanks; on the right side - at the foot of the mountains with peaked peaks - the Azerbaijani village and in front of it arable land. On the link of the fishery and the village in the foreground is a tractor operated by a tractor driver. The wreath is crocheted with a ribbon of red (scarlet) color in three interceptions: the upper intercepts are connected by a ribbon passing through the middle of the emblem above the sickle and hammer, with the inscription on it written in the Latin alphabet in Turkic: "Azerbaijan Socialist Soviet Republic".

On the lower interception, common to both sides of the coat of arms, is the inscription in the same alphabet: "Proletarians of all countries, unite.

— Constitution of the Azerbaijan SSR (1931), Div. V, Chapter IX, Art. 99.

The official design of the emblem was created by theatrical artist Benedikt (Beno) Rafailovich Telingater (1876-1960), who had created the previous unofficial version of the coat of arms of the Azerbaijan SSR.

=== Third emblem ===
After the creation of the new constitution of the USSR in 1936, Azerbaijan SSR also sought to create a new constitution. The new Constitution of the Azerbaijani SSR, adopted by the Extraordinary IX All-Azerbaijan Congress of Soviets on 14 March 1937, established a description of the new state emblem of the Azerbaijan SSR:

The State Emblem of the Azerbaijan Soviet Socialist Republic is an image of a sickle and a hammer, an oil rig against the backdrop of the rising sun, framed with a wreath of cotton and ears, with an inscription in Azerbaijani and Russian languages:"Azerbaijan Soviet Socialist Republic", and "Workers of all countries, unite!". At the top of the coat of arms is a five-pointed star.

— Constitution of the Azerbaijani SSR (1937), Article 151

The official design of the emblem was created by the graphic artist Ruben Shkhiyan.

==== First revision ====
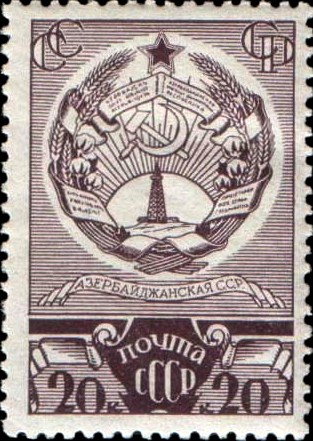
Emblem of the Azerbaijan SSR on a 1937 postage stamp

The words on the emblem were changed at the end of 1937, in order to distance the emblem from the Turkish language. On the coat of arms, the word "SYRA" (soviet) was replaced by "SOVET", and the word "ÇYMHYRIJJƏTI" (republic) was replaced by "RESPUВLIQASЬ". This shift in wording was not exclusive to the emblem, and was implemented within the Azerbaijani language itself, and the changed wording remained the standard of the language thereafter.

==== Second revision ====
In accordance with the Law of the Azerbaijan SSR "On the Shift of Azerbaijani Letters from the Latin to the Russian Alphabet" adopted on 11 July 1939, the letters of the Azerbaijani language on 1 January 1940 was shifted from the Latin alphabet into the Cyrillic alphabet (adjusted according to the Azeri language). By the decree of the Presidium of the Supreme Soviet of the Azerbaijan SSR of 20 March 1940, inscriptions on the state emblem of the Azerbaijan SSR were depicted in Cyrillic letters.

On 5 May 1956, the Decree of the Presidium of the Supreme Soviet of the Azerbaijan SSR approved the "Regulations on the State Emblem of the Azerbaijan Soviet Socialist Republic", which established a more accurate depiction, including a light red circle, against which the elements of the coat of arms were depicted (in the constitutional description, there was no mention of this background).

==== Third revision ====
On 21 April 1978, the new Constitution (Basic Law) of the Azerbaijani SSR was adopted, the description of the state emblem in which remained unchanged, but in the graphic annex to the "Regulations on the State Emblem of the Azerbaijan Soviet Socialist Republic", the sun's rays were depicted somewhat less often, and the shade of the pink circle is lighter than in the figure in the 1956 Statute.

== Gallery ==
Unofficial emblem from 1920 to 1921.

Emblem of the Azerbaijan Soviet Socialist Republic (1921-1927)

Emblem of the Azerbaijan Soviet Socialist Republic (1927-1931)

Emblem of the Azerbaijan Soviet Socialist Republic (1931-1937)

Emblem of the Azerbaijan Soviet Socialist Republic (1937-1940)

Emblem of the Azerbaijan Soviet Socialist Republic (1940-1978)

Emblem of the Azerbaijan Soviet Socialist Republic (1978-1991) and the Republic of Azerbaijan (1991-1993)

== See also ==
- Flag of the Azerbaijan Soviet Socialist Republic
- National emblem of Azerbaijan
- Emblem of the Nakhichevan Autonomous Soviet Socialist Republic
