= National emblem of Azerbaijan =

Emblem of Azerbaijan Azərbaycan gerbi
- Armiger: Republic of Azerbaijan
- Adopted: 19 January 1993
- Compartment: Wheat and Oak

The state emblem of Azerbaijan (Azerbaijani: Azərbaycan gerbi) mixes traditional and modern symbols. The focal point of the emblem is a stylized flame. The flame is a reference to Azerbaijan's eternal natural oil-gas resources, which has given it the nickname "land of eternal fire".

The emblem is supported by a crossed stalk of wheat and an oak bough. Wheat is the symbol of abundance in Azerbaijan. Also, wheat bread is the main staple food. The oak tree is the symbol of power and youth in time.

== History ==
The government of the Azerbaijan Democratic Republic declared a competition on the national emblem of Azerbaijan on 30 January 1920 and made a decision to present the emblem model on May of the same year. But due to the collapse of the Azerbaijan Democratic Republic on 28 April 1920, the emblem was not approved. However it was already adopted and used by the Azerbaijani émigré in the various publications.

The Supreme Mejlis of the Nakhichevan Autonomous Republic discussed the issue connected with the national emblem and sent a petition to the Supreme Council of the Azerbaijan SSR on the declaration of a new competition on the national emblem of Azerbaijan on 17 November 1990.

The competition was declared by the decision of the Supreme Council of the Azerbaijan Republic on 5 February 1991. Tens of projects of the emblem were presented during the competition of 1991–1992, and it was also proposed to approve one of the projects developed between 1919–1920.

By the Constitutional Law of the Supreme Council of the Azerbaijan Republic, approved on 19 January 1993, one of the projects, developed between 1919–1920 with certain alterations was confirmed the national emblem of Azerbaijan.

Coat of arms of the Azerbaijan Democratic Republic, 1920.

Emblem of the Azerbaijan Soviet Socialist Republic (1978–1991) and the post-Soviet Republic of Azerbaijan (5 February 1991–19 January 1993)

== Meaning ==
The colours used in composing the emblem are taken from the national flag. The green represents Islam; red represents the development and democracy of Azerbaijan, and blue represents that the Azerbaijanis are a Turkic people. The eight-pointed star (octagram) itself stands for the eight branches of the Turkic peoples, and between each point of the star, there is a smaller yellow circle found.

The National Emblem symbolizes the independence of Azerbaijan. It is the image of an oriental shield and a semicircle formed by the branches of an oak-tree and ears resting on it. The shield contains the word Allah written in Arabic in the shape of a fire that draws allusion to Azerbaijan's adopted motto, the "land of fire" – in the center of an eight-point star against a background of the colours of the National flag.

== Usage ==
The Azerbaijani emblem appears on:

- The residence and the private office of the President of the Azerbaijan Republic;
- The building of the Parliament of the Azerbaijan Republic, its conference hall and the private office of the chair of the parliament;
- All courts, buildings of military tribunals, halls of judicial assembly; private offices of the chairs of the Supreme Court and Constitutional Court of the Azerbaijan Republic;
- Buildings of state bodies in cases stipulated in the legislative system of the Azerbaijan Republic;
- Buildings of diplomatic and trade representations and consulates of the Azerbaijan Republic.

== See also ==
- Emblem of the Azerbaijan SSR
