= Flag of Azerbaijan =

Republic of Azerbaijan
- "Tricolour Flag"
- Use: National flag and ensign
- Proportion: 1:2
- Adopted: 9 November 1918; 108 years ago (original design); 5 February 1991; 35 years ago (restored); 22 October 2013; 13 years ago (colors standardized)
- Design: A horizontal tricolor of bright blue, red, and green, with a white crescent and an eight-pointed star centred on a red band

The national flag of Azerbaijan, often referred to as the Tricolor flag (Azerbaijani: Üçrəngli Bayraq), is a horizontal tricolor that features three equally sized bars of bright blue, red, and green; a white crescent; and a centred eight-pointed star. The flag has become the predominant and most recognizable symbol of Azerbaijan. The bright blue represents Azerbaijan's Turkic identity, the red represents progress, and the green represents Islam, which is Azerbaijan's majority religion.

The Azerbaijani Flag Day, held every year on 9 November, was established by Law No. 595 on 17 November 2009. The day commemorates the first official adoption of the tricolor as a national flag by the Azerbaijan Democratic Republic, which occurred on 9 November 1918. The flag was used by the republic until the 1920 Soviet invasion of Azerbaijan. It was reinstated, with slight variations to the colors and size, on 5 February 1991 following the country's independence from the Soviet Union.

The flag is referred to in the national constitution and mentioned twice in the national anthem, Azərbaycan marşı. On land, the flag is used as the civil, state and war flag; at sea, it is used as the civil, state, naval ensigns, and the naval jack. The Azerbaijani law regulates the flag's use and display, protecting it from desecration. The flag also has official status in Nakhchivan, an autonomous republic within Azerbaijan.

== History ==
=== Azerbaijan Democratic Republic (1918–1920) ===
Flag of Azerbaijan between 21 June and 9 November 1918

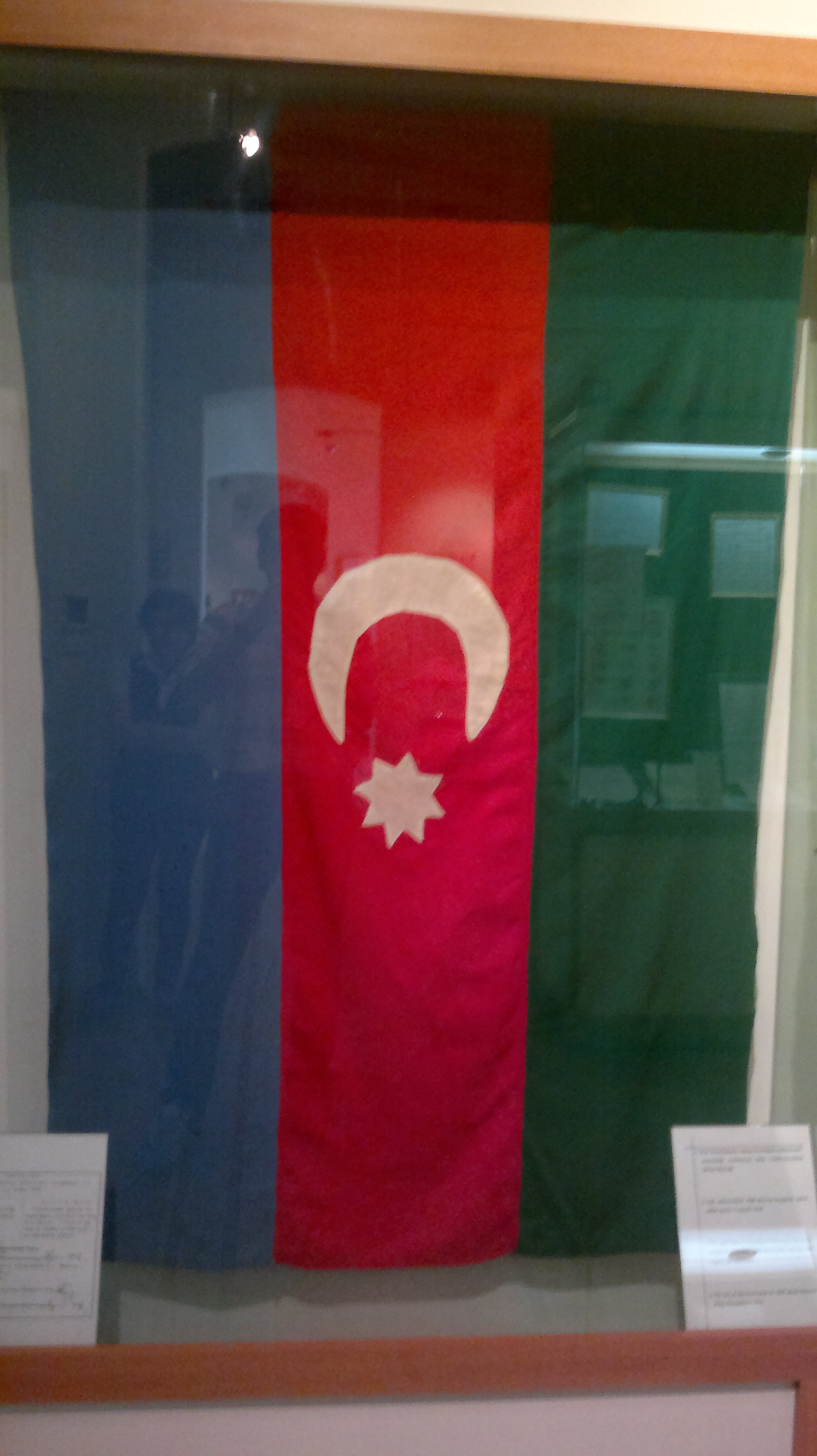
ADR flag made by Mammad Amin Rasulzade during the years of emigration

On 28 May 1918, the Azerbaijan Democratic Republic (ADR) declared independence. One of the first actions of the republic was the adoption of national symbols. Taking inspiration from the flag of the Ottoman Empire, the ADR adopted its first state flag on 21 June 1918, which depicted a white crescent and a white eight-pointed star on a red background. The new flag was almost identical to the old Ottoman Empire flag, which also featured an eight-pointed star until 1844 when it was replaced by a five-pointed star. The similarities between the flags reflected the hegemony of the Ottoman Empire at the time, as well as the ethnic kinship between the Turkic populations of ADR and the Ottoman Empire.

Within a few months, the newly adopted flag began to be questioned due to it exclusively representing Turkism. Thus, it was suggested that a new flag be created. The new flag was to reflect three ideas: Turkism, Islamism and the desire for progress. These ideas reflected the official ideology of ADR, which was "Turkicisation, Islamicization, and Modernisation". The formation of these ideas was influenced by the work of Islamic ideologist Jamal al-Din al-Afghani who, in his books "The Philosophy of National Unity and the True Essence of Religious Unification" and "Islamic Unity", wrote that the progress of Muslim peoples is possible under the condition of religious consolidation, national unity and the study of the progressive traditions of European statehood.

On 9 November 1918, a draft of an updated state flag was approved. The colors of the flag were borrowed from Ali bey Huseynzade's concept Turkify, Islamize, Europeanize. The new flag was a horizontal tricolor of blue, red and green with a white crescent and an eight-pointed star placed in the centre.

On 7 December 1918, the updated state flag was raised over Azerbaijan's parliament building. In a speech to the parliament, Mammad Amin Rasulzade, the Azerbaijani National Council chairman who had declared ADR's independence, stated: "[...] and for this reason, gentlemen, the National Council has raised this three-colored flag, which represents Azerbaijan, and this flag, the symbol of Turkic sovereignty, Islamic culture, and modern European power, will always fly above us. This flag, once raised, will never come down again".

==== Use of the Azerbaijan Democratic Republic flag after 1920 ====
Patch worn by the Azerbaijani Legion which fought for Nazi Germany during World War II

After the fall of the Azerbaijan Democratic Republic in April 1920 following the Red Army invasion, their flag was used by emigrant organizations outside the Soviet Union. During World War II, the ADR flag was used by the battalions of the Azerbaijani Legion, who were military formations of ethnic Azerbaijanis fighting on the side of Nazi Germany. Depicted on the sleeve emblems of the Azerbaijan Legion's uniforms were three horizontal equal stripes of blue, red and green; a white crescent; and a five-pointed star on a red field.

The ADR flag was used during a congress of Azerbaijanis headed by former Soviet Azerbaijani major Abdurrahman Fatalibeyli, held in Berlin, Germany on 6 November 1943. In 1922, Mammad Amin Rasulzade fled from Soviet Russia, through Finland and to Turkey. While there in 1952, he made a copy of the ADR flag, which he later gave to his friend Gulmirza Baghirov. Baghirov secretly brought the flag to Azerbaijan and hung it on his home in Maştağa in 1976. It was given to the National Museum of History of Azerbaijan in July 2003 and has since been kept in the museum.

In 1956, a protester named Jahid Hilaloghlu raised the ADR flag over Maiden Tower in Baku, showing his defiance of Soviet Azerbaijan. Hilaloghlu was sentenced to four years of imprisonment and his supporter Chingiz Abdullayev was institutionalized.

Flag of ADR in historical photographs

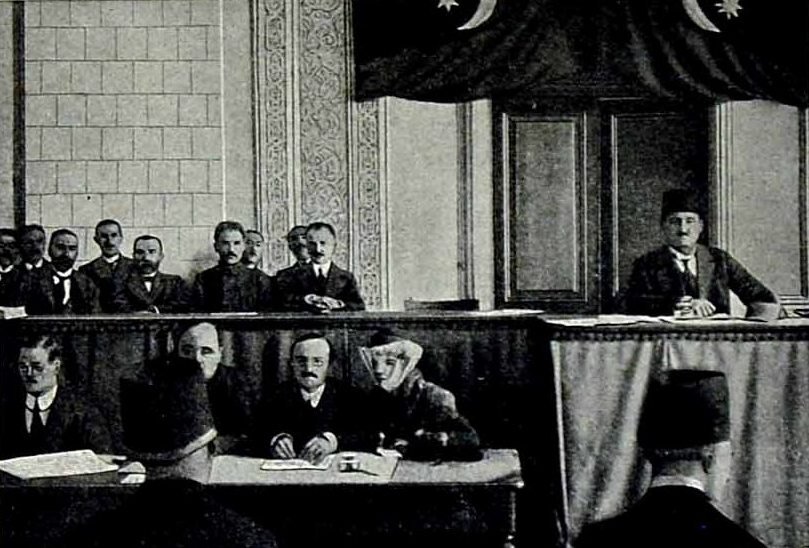
The first meeting of the Parliament of the Azerbaijan Democratic Republic, where a tricolor flag was hung. 7 December 1918.

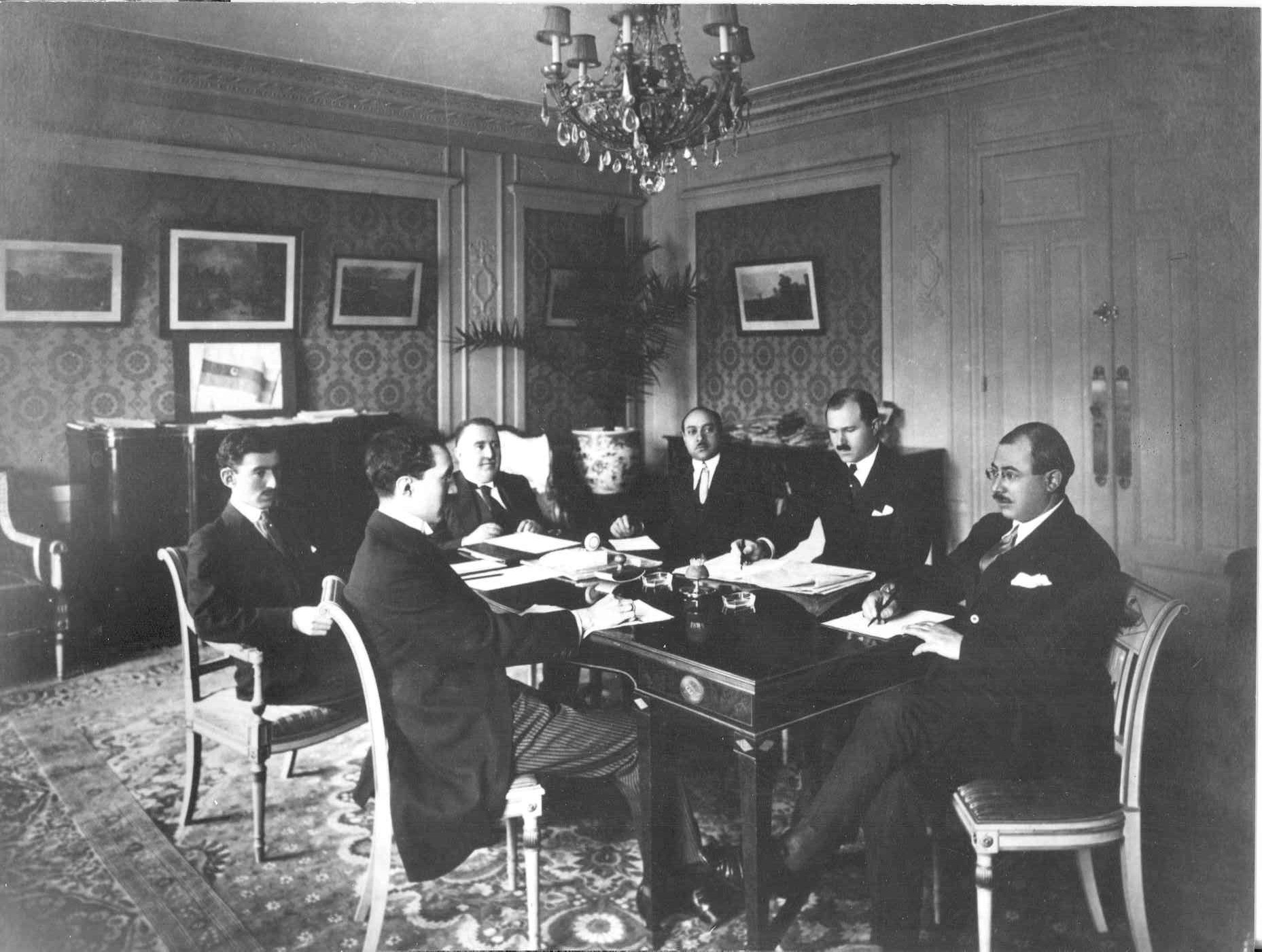
Azerbaijani delegation in Paris at the Claridge Hotel during the Paris Peace Conference, 1919. The tricolor flag of the ADR is visible in the background, on the chest of drawers.

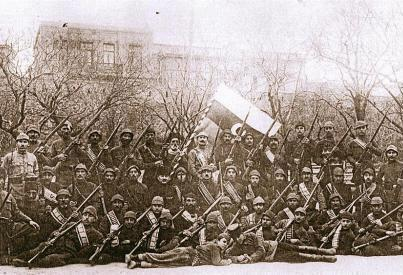
Officers and soldiers of the army of the Azerbaijan Democratic Republic against the background of the state tricolor

=== Azerbaijan SSR (1920–1991) ===
Flag of Soviet Azerbaijan between 1952 and 1990. Ratio: 1:2

On 28 April 1920, Azerbaijan became a Soviet republic, as the Azerbaijan Soviet Socialist Republic (Soviet Azerbaijan). The state flags of the Azerbaijan Democratic Republic were banned during this period. While under Soviet rule, the Soviet Azerbaijan used eight different flags. Most of the flags only variated slightly. The adaptations were the result of the chaotic early years of the Soviet Union in the Caucasus. The first unofficial Soviet Azerbaijan flag was used during the Soviet conquest of Baku on 28 April 1920.

Soviet Azerbaijan's first official flag was adopted on 19 May 1921, in its first constitution under Article 104. At the time, the state language of Soviet Azerbaijan was Azerbaijani Turkic and its alphabet was based on the Arabic script. Therefore, the words A.S.R. were written in Arabic. The eighth and final flag of Soviet Azerbaijan was issued on 7 October 1952. The design was similar to the Soviet national flag but included a horizontal blue band on the bottom, which took up a quarter of the flag's height. The flag's definition was as follows:

The national flag of Azerbaijan Soviet Socialist Republic is a panel consisting of two horizontal bands of color: the upper red part of three-quarters of the width and the bottom is blue, nearly one quarter the width of the flag with the image on the top left corner of the red band, at the flagpole and gold hammer and sickle, and above them a red five-pointed star framed by gold fringe. The ratio of width to length is 1:2.

=== Republic of Azerbaijan (1991–present) ===
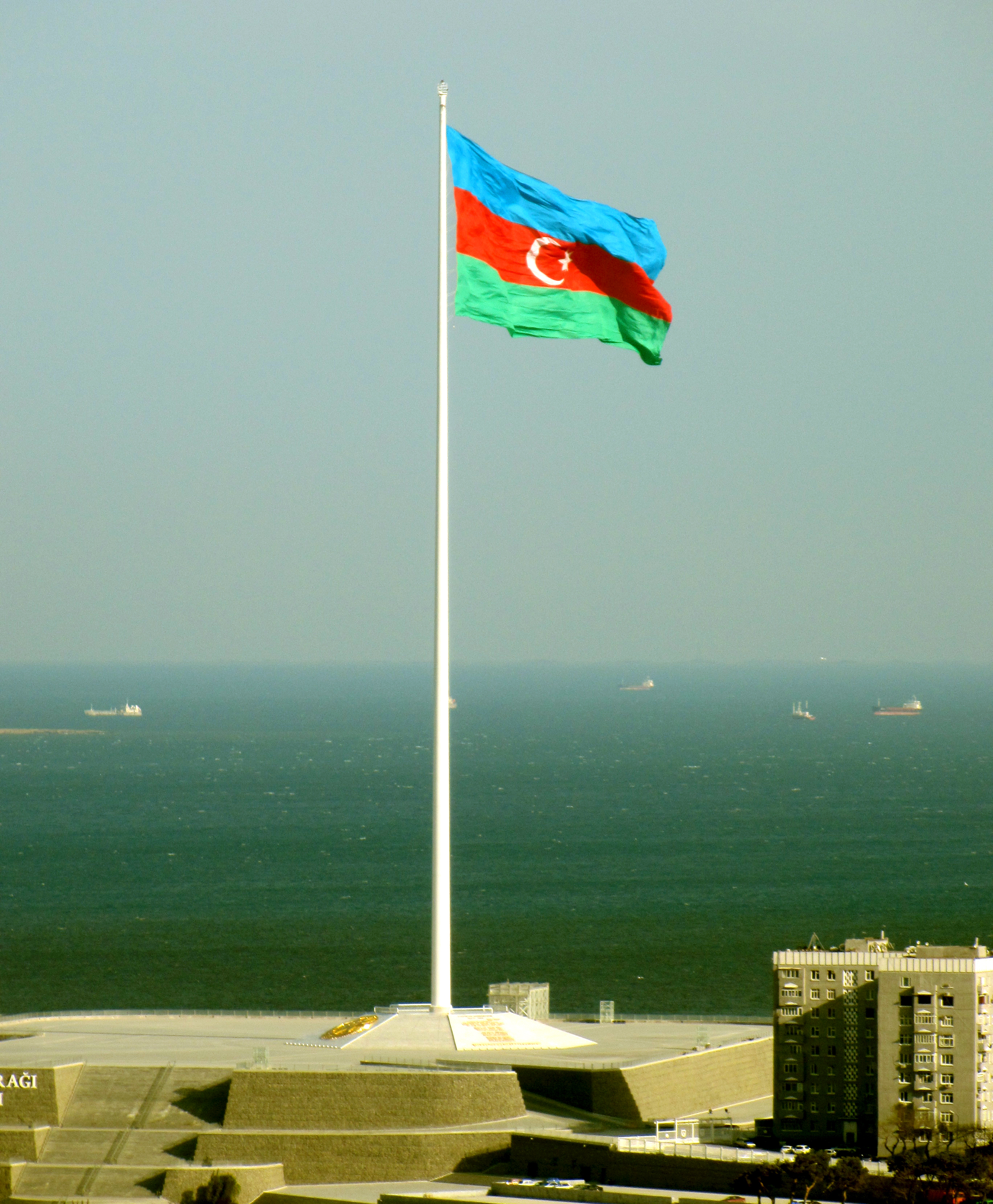
National Flag Square in Baku

In the late 1980s, during unrest in Soviet Azerbaijan, the tricolor Azerbaijan Democratic Republic flag was used in demonstrations calling for independence. On 17 November 1990, during the first session of the Supreme Assembly of the Nakhchivan Autonomous Republic, the 1918 ADR flag was adopted as the national flag of the autonomous state. This flag was later adopted with the decree, "On change the name and national flag of Azerbaijan SSR". The decree was issued on 29 November 1990 by the president of Azerbaijan SSR and ratified on 5 February 1991 by the Supreme Soviet of the Azerbaijan SSR. The first constitution since independence was adopted on 12 November 1995 after a national vote; one of the articles described the three-color flag of the republic.

On 17 November 2007, the Azerbaijani president Ilham Aliyev issued a decree "On creation of the National Flag Square" in Baku. The square had a 162 metre tall flag pole weighing 220 tons. The flag flown on the pole was 35 metres wide and 70 metres long, and weighed 350 kilograms. A museum dedicated to the national flag was also built at the flagpole. On 1 September 2010, the flag was officially raised to open the museum; subsequently becoming the world's tallest unsupported flagpole, until being overtaken by Tajikistan's 165 metre Dushanbe Flagpole in 2011. The flagpole was dismantled in 2017 due to the risks of the structure falling onto Baku Boulevard grounds.

== Timeline gallery ==
Flag of the Azerbaijan Democratic Republic (1918)

Flag of the Azerbaijan Democratic Republic (1918–1920)

Flag of the Azerbaijan Soviet Socialist Republic (1920)

Flag of the Azerbaijan Soviet Socialist Republic (1920–1921)

Flag of the Azerbaijan Soviet Socialist Republic (1921–1922)

Flag of the Azerbaijan Soviet Socialist Republic within the TSFSR (1924–1927)

Flag of the Azerbaijan Soviet Socialist Republic within the TSFSR (1927–1931)

Flag of the Azerbaijan Soviet Socialist Republic within the TSFSR (1931–1937)

Flag of the Transcaucasian SFSR (1930s–1936)

Flag of the Azerbaijan Soviet Socialist Republic (1937–1940)

Flag of the Azerbaijan Soviet Socialist Republic (1940–1952)

Flag of the Azerbaijan Soviet Socialist Republic (1952–1991)

Flag of the Republic of Azerbaijan (1991–2013)

Flag of the Republic of Azerbaijan (2013–present)

== Design ==
Construction sheet of the Azerbaijani flag

The national flag of Azerbaijan consists of three horizontal stripes of equal width, from top to bottom: light blue, red, and green. A white crescent and an eight-pointed star are in the centre. The basic description of the flag, along with its ratio, is indicated in the Constitution of Azerbaijan:

State flag of the Azerbaijan Republic consists of three horizontal stripes of the same width. The upper stripe is blue, the middle stripe is red, and the lower one is green; in the middle of the red stripe on both sides of the flag white crescent with an eight-pointed star is depicted. The width of the flag constitutes half of its length.

Further specifications of the flag were detailed in the presidential decree, "On the National Flag of the Republic of Azerbaijan", issued on 5 February 1991. The ratio was kept at 1:2, which was used during the Soviet era. Each stripe fully extends to one-third of the flag's total height. The star and crescent are placed in the centre of the red stripe. The outside diameter of both the crescent and the red inside circle intersects with the diameter of the star. The diameter of the star is one-sixth the height of the flag, while the inscribed circle within the star is one-twelfth the height of the flag.

=== Color ===
The flag is colored green, red, sky blue, and white. The exact specifications for its colors were issued in the 2004 decree "On the Rules of the National Flag of the Republic of Azerbaijan". The color scheme used before 2013 is as follows:

| Colors scheme before 2013 | Blue | Red | Green |
|---|---|---|---|
| RAL | 5015 | 3020 | 6024 |
| CMYK | 100-22-0-24 | 0-100-77-12 | 100-0-42-32 |
| HEX | #0098C3 | #E00034 | #00AE65 |
| RGB | 0-152-195 | 224-0-52 | 0-174-101 |

The colors, updated in 2013 and ratified in 2018 and specified in Pantone, are as follows:

| Colors scheme 2013–present | Blue | Red | Green |
|---|---|---|---|
| RAL | 5012 | 3018 | 6018 |
| Pantone | 306 C | Red 032 C | 362 C |
| CMYK | 100-20-0-11 | 0-79-73-6 | 49-0-70-38 |
| HEX | #00B5E2 | #EF3340 | #509E2F |
| RGB | 0-181-226 | 239-51-64 | 80-158-47 |

=== Symbolism ===
The bright blue symbolizes the Turkic heritage of Azerbaijan, the red reflects the creation of a modern state and the development of democracy, and green symbolizes Islam. In the centre of the flag, appearing on both the front and the back, there is a crescent and star, comprising a white crescent and an eight-pointed star.

While the crescent and star are typically seen as markers of Islam, some historians and researchers disagree about why the eight-pointed star is on the flag. Fatali Khan Khoyski points to the eight letters in the word "Azerbaijan" (آذربایجان) when written in Arabic. The eight points of the star are also thought to stand for the eight Turkic peoples classified in pre-Soviet times: Azerbaijanis, Ottomans (Turks), Chagatais, Tatars, Kipchaks, Seljuks, and Turkomans. It is possible the Kipchaks actually reflect two peoples, the Kazakhs and Kyrgyz, which would make eight.

== Protocol ==
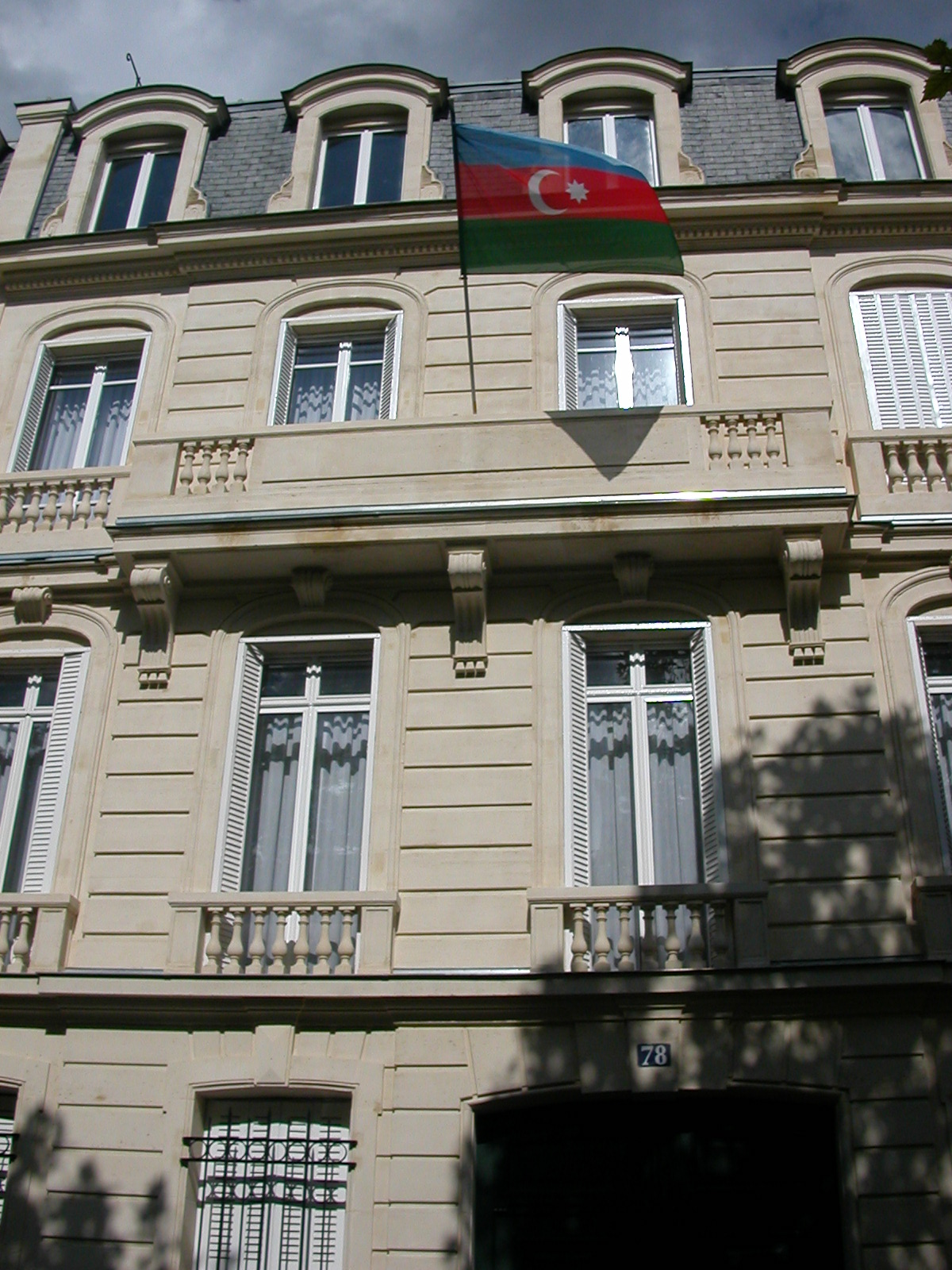
Flag of Azerbaijan over the building of the Azerbaijani embassy in Paris

According to Article 2 of Law No. 683 of the Republic of Azerbaijan, dated 8 June 2004 (as amended on 1 September 2005), the national flag must be raised by the following:

| Office | Buildings | Vehicles |
|---|---|---|
| President of Azerbaijan | check | check |
| Prime Minister of Azerbaijan | check | check |
| Speaker of the National Assembly | check | check |
| Cabinet of Ministers | check | |
| Constitutional Court of Azerbaijan | check | |
| Supreme Court of Azerbaijan | check | |
| Judicial-Legal Council of Azerbaijan | check | |
| Central Executive Authorities | check | check |
| Prosecutor of the Central Bank of Azerbaijan | check | check |
| Central Election Commission of Azerbaijan | check | |
| Chamber of the Azerbaijan | check | |
| Supreme Assembly of Nakhchivan | check | |
| Cabinet of Ministers of Nakhchivan | check | |
| Supreme Court of Nakhchivan | check | |
| Local executive authorities of Nakhchivan | check | check |
| Commissioner for Human Rights | check | |
| Deputy Speaker of the National Assembly | check | |
| Embassies in Azerbaijan | check | |
| Consulates in Azerbaijan | check | |
| Vessels registered in the Commercial Maritime Code | | check |
| Foreign vessels within Azerbaijani waters | | check |
| Border crossings of Azerbaijan | check | |

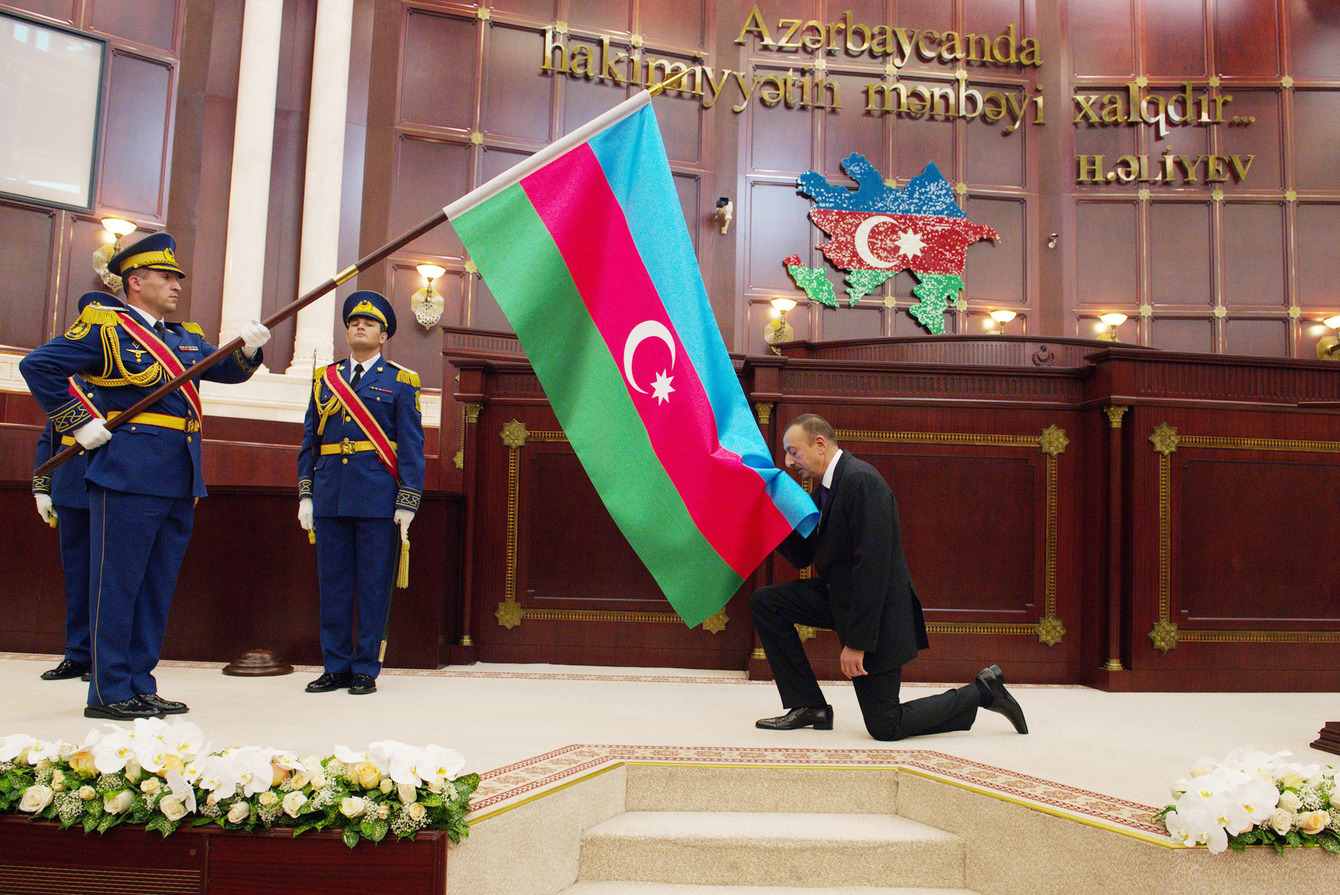
A member of the Azerbaijani National Guard holding the national flag

The national flag must also be raised over the buildings, military courts and headquarters of military units and naval vessels of the Armed Forces of the Republic of Azerbaijan in the following cases:

- During the public holidays
- During the military oath
- In the case of awarding of military units or military courts
- When a military unit or military vessel is located on the territory of another country

When hanging upright without a flagpole, the Azerbaijani flag must be placed on the wall of the building in a vertical position, so that the green side of the flag appears on the left.

=== Legal protection ===
Flag desecration in Azerbaijan is considered a crime. According to Article 324 Criminal Code of Azerbaijan "Desecration of the State Flag or the State Emblem of the Republic of Azerbaijan" is punishable by restriction of liberties for up to two years or imprisonment for up to one year. Desecration can be expressed in the commission by persons over the age of 16 of a wide variety of active public actions, indicating a disrespectful attitude towards the flag, for example, its destruction, damage, or cynical drawings or inscriptions.

== State Flag Day ==
The Day of the State Flag of Azerbaijan was established by Law No. 595, enacted 17 November 2009 by president Ilham Aliyev. It is held annually on 9 November. The date is considered a non-working day in the country. During his speech at the opening ceremony of the State Flag Square, Ilham Aliyev stated that the reason for signing the order on 17 November was that the ADR flag was reinstated as the state flag of Republic of Azerbaijan on 17 November 1990.

== Influence ==
The expression by Rasulzade (Azerbaijani: "Bir kərə yüksələn bayraq, bir daha enməz!"; "The flag once raised will never fall!") was the rallying cry of Azerbaijani independence in early 20th century. In 1919, Jafar Jabbarly wrote the poem, "To Azerbaijani flag" in dedication to the state symbols of Azerbaijan.

The national flag is also mentioned in the national anthem of Azerbaijan, "Azərbaycan marşı" (transl. March of Azerbaijan), in the fifth and fifteenth sentences. The passages have the following unofficial English translation: "With three color banner live happily!" and "To hold high your honoured flag."

== See also ==
- Coat of arms of Azerbaijan
- Azerbaijani Flag Order
- List of Azerbaijani flags

== Literature ==
- Swietochowski, Tadeusz (1995). Russia and Azerbaijan: a Borderland in Transition. New York: Columbia University Press. ISBN 978-0-231-07068-3.
- Ahmedov, Sabuhi (2010). "Государственный флаг азербайджанской Республики" [State flag of the Azerbaijan Republic] (PDF). Геральдика (in Russian). 2 (44).
- Vasilevich, Zagoruiko Mikhail (2014). "Символы флага и герба Республики Азербайджан" [Symbols of the Flag and Emblem of the Republic of Azerbaijan]. Economic Consultant (in Russian). 4 (8).
- Marshall, Tim (4 July 2017). A Flag Worth Dying For: The Power and Politics of National Symbols. Simon and Schuster. ISBN 978-1-5011-6833-8.
- Tokluoglu, Ceylan (1 July 2005). "Definitions of National Identity, Nationalism and Ethnicity in Post-Soviet Azerbaijan in the 1990s". Ethnic and Racial Studies. 28 (4): 722–758. doi:10.1080/01419870500092951. hdl:11511/64196. ISSN 0141-9870. S2CID 39891613.
- Suny, Richard (1996). Transcaucasia, Nationalism and Social Change: Essays in the History of Armenia, Azerbaijan, and Georgia. Ann Arbor: University of Michigan Press. ISBN 978-0-472-06617-9.
- Swietochowski, Tadeusz; Collins, Brian C. (1999). Historical Dictionary of Azerbaijan. Lanham, Md.: Scarecrow Press. ISBN 978-0-8108-3550-4.
- Heydarov, Tale; Bagiyev, Tale (2005). Azerbaijan: 100 Questions Answered. Azeri-Anglo Youth Society. ISBN 978-9952-8068-0-9.
- Smith, Whitney (2001). Flag Lore of All Nations (A Millbrook Press library ed.). Brookfield, Conn.: Millbrook Press. ISBN 978-0-7613-1753-1.
- Hasanli, Jamil (16 December 2015). Foreign Policy of the Republic of Azerbaijan: The Difficult Road to Western Integration, 1918–1920. London: Routledge. ISBN 978-1-317-36616-4.
- Drobyazko, Sergey; Karaschuk, Andrei (1999). Вторая мировая война 1939–1945. Восточные легионы и казачьи части в вермахте [World War II 1939–1945. Eastern legions and Cossack units in the Wehrmacht] (in Russian). Moscow: AST. ISBN 978-5-237-03026-6.
- Yaqublu, Nəsiman (2009). Əbdürrəhman Fətəlibəyli-Düdənginski [Abdurrahman Fatalibayli-Dudenginski] (in Azerbaijani). Abşeron Nəşr. p. 262. ISBN 978-9952-8020-8-5.
- Goltz, Thomas (1998). Azerbaijan Diary: A Rogue Reporter's Adventures in an Oil-rich, War-torn, Post-Soviet Republic. Armonk, N.Y.: M.E. Sharpe. ISBN 978-0-7656-0243-5.
- Bolukbasi, Suha (1 October 2013). Azerbaijan: A Political History. London: Bloomsbury Publishing. ISBN 978-0-85773-762-5.
- Altstadt, Audrey L. (23 May 2017). Frustrated Democracy in Post-Soviet Azerbaijan. Washington, D.C.: Columbia University Press. ISBN 978-0-231-80141-6.
- Pope, Hugh (2005). Sons of the Conquerors: The Rise of the Turkic World. Overlook Duckworth. ISBN 978-0-7156-3368-7.
- Hille, Charlotte Mathilde Louise (2010). State Building and Conflict Resolution in the Caucasus. Leiden: Brill. ISBN 978-90-47-44136-6.
- Özer, Utku (2019). "Early Nation-Building Policies in Post-Soviet Azerbaijan". International Journal of Turcologia. 14 (28): 6–30.
- Bordeleau, André G. (22 October 2013). Flags of the Night Sky: When Astronomy Meets National Pride. New York: Springer Science & Business Media. ISBN 978-1-4614-0929-8.
- Rookwood, Joel (3 April 2022). "From Sport-for-Development to Sports Mega-Events: Conflict, Authoritarian Modernisation and Statecraft in Azerbaijan". Sport in Society. 25 (4): 861. doi:10.1080/17430437.2021.2019710. ISSN 1743-0437. S2CID 245453904.
- Matjunin, Sergei (2000). "The New State Flags as the Iconographic Symbols of the Post-Soviet Space". GeoJournal. 52 (4): 311–313. Bibcode:2000GeoJo..52..311M. doi:10.1023/A:1014378626699. ISSN 0343-2521. JSTOR 41147569. S2CID 150560930.
- Complete Flags of the World: The Ultimate Pocket Guide. London: Dorling Kindersley Limited. 2 June 2014. ISBN 978-0-241-18022-8.
- Znamierowski, Alfred (2001). The World Encyclopedia of Flags: The Definitive Guide to International Flags, Banners, Standards and Ensigns. London: Hermes House. ISBN 978-1-84309-042-7.
- Çağla, Cengiz (30 June 2019). "Nation-Building in Southern Caucasus: The Case of Arzerbaijan (1900–1920)". Journal of Balkan and Black Sea Studies (2): 31–55. ISSN 2667-470X.
