= Finland at the 2019 World Aquatics Championships =

- Flag of Finland
- FINA code: FIN
- National federation: Suomen Uimaliitto
- Website: www.uimaliitto.fi

in Gwangju, South Korea
- Medals: Gold 0 Silver 0 Bronze 0 Total 0

World Aquatics Championships appearances
- 1973; 1975; 1978; 1982; 1986; 1991; 1994; 1998; 2001; 2003; 2005; 2007; 2009; 2011; 2013; 2015; 2017; 2019; 2022; 2023; 2024

Finland competed at the 2019 World Aquatics Championships in Gwangju, South Korea from 12 to 28 July.

== Diving ==
Finland entered three divers.

Women

Athlete	Event	Preliminaries		Semifinals		Final	
Athlete	Event	Points	Rank	Points	Rank	Points	Rank
Lauren Hallaselkä	1 m springboard	203.50	30	—		did not advance	
Roosa Kanerva	1 m springboard	199.90	34	—		did not advance	
Nea Immonen	3 m springboard	225.75	38	did not advance			

== Swimming ==
Finland has entered seven swimmers.

Men

Athlete	Event	Heat		Semifinal		Final	
Athlete	Event	Time	Rank	Time	Rank	Time	Rank
Ari-Pekka Liukkonen	50 m freestyle	22.33	=21	did not advance			
Ari-Pekka Liukkonen	100 m freestyle	49.98	=44	did not advance			
Ari-Pekka Liukkonen	50 m breaststroke	28.45	43	did not advance			
Matti Mattsson	200 m breaststroke	2:13.80	33	did not advance			
Riku Pöytäkivi	50 m butterfly	23.93	31	did not advance			
Riku Pöytäkivi	100 m butterfly	53.62	33	did not advance			

Women

Athlete	Event	Heat		Semifinal		Final	
Athlete	Event	Time	Rank	Time	Rank	Time	Rank
Ida Hulkko	50 m breaststroke	30.72	8 Q	30.91	6 Q	31.23	8
Ida Hulkko	100 m breaststroke	1:08.34	19	did not advance			
Mimosa Jallow	50 m freestyle	25.66	29	did not advance			
Mimosa Jallow	50 m backstroke	28.04	9 Q	28.10	14	did not advance	
Mimosa Jallow	100 m backstroke	1:01.39	26	did not advance			
Mimosa Jallow	50 m butterfly	26.62	20	did not advance			
Laura Lahtinen	400 m freestyle	4:16.43	25	—		did not advance	
Laura Lahtinen	800 m freestyle	8:54.94	31	—		did not advance	
Laura Lahtinen	200 m butterfly	2:10.39	14 Q	2:10.78	15	did not advance	
Jenna Laukkanen	50 m breaststroke	31.48	19	did not advance			
Jenna Laukkanen	200 m breaststroke	2:31.68	27	did not advance			
Jenna Laukkanen	200 m individual medley	2:16.28	23	did not advance			
Mimosa Jallow; Ida Hulkko; Jenna Laukkanen; Laura Lahtinen	4 × 100 m medley relay	4:05.50	18	—		did not advance	
