= Swimming at the 2022 World Aquatics Championships – Men's 100 metre breaststroke =

Men's 100 metre breaststroke at the 2022 World Aquatics Championships
- Venue: Danube Arena
- Location: Budapest, Hungary
- Dates: 18 June (heats and semifinals); 19 June (final)
- Competitors: 63 from 61 nations
- Winning time: 58.26

Medalists
gold medal	Nicolò Martinenghi	Italy
silver medal	Arno Kamminga	Netherlands
bronze medal	Nic Fink	United States

The Men's 100 metre breaststroke competition at the 2022 World Aquatics Championships was held on 18 and 19 June 2022.

== Records ==
Prior to the competition, the existing world and championship records were as follows.

World record	Adam Peaty (GBR)	56.88	Gwangju, South Korea	21 July 2019
Competition record	Adam Peaty (GBR)	56.88	Gwangju, South Korea	21 July 2019

== Results ==
=== Heats ===
The heats were started on 18 June at 10:36.

Rank	Heat	Lane	Name	Nationality	Time	Notes
1	7	4	Arno Kamminga	Netherlands	58.69	Q
2	7	5	Nic Fink	United States	58.81	Q
3	6	4	Michael Andrew	United States	58.96	Q
4	5	4	Nicolò Martinenghi	Italy	59.06	Q
5	5	5	Yan Zibei	China	59.83	Q
6	6	6	Caspar Corbeau	Netherlands	59.89	Q
7	5	3	Ryuya Mura	Japan	59.90	Q
7	6	3	Andrius Šidlauskas	Lithuania	59.90	Q
9	7	6	Lucas Matzerath	Germany	59.94	Q
10	5	6	Zac Stubblety-Cook	Australia	1:00.12	Q
11	6	5	James Wilby	Great Britain	1:00.14	Q
12	7	1	Erik Persson	Sweden	1:00.34	Q
13	6	7	Matti Mattsson	Finland	1:00.37	Q
13	7	2	Cho Sung-jae	South Korea	1:00.37	Q
15	7	7	Bernhard Reitshammer	Austria	1:00.66	Q
16	6	8	Kristian Pitshugin	Israel	1:00.70	Q
17	4	3	Dawid Wiekiera	Poland	1:00.80	
17	7	0	Anton McKee	Iceland	1:00.80	
19	7	3	Berkay Ömer Öğretir	Turkey	1:00.82	
20	6	2	Denis Petrashov	Kyrgyzstan	1:00.86	
21	7	8	Lyubomir Epitropov	Bulgaria	1:01.06	
22	5	1	Jérémy Desplanches	Switzerland	1:01.24	
23	6	9	Brenden Crawford	South Africa	1:01.25	
24	5	2	Felipe França Silva	Brazil	1:01.41	
25	6	0	Konstantinos Meretsolias	Greece	1:01.46	
26	5	8	Carl Aitkaci	France	1:01.51	
27	4	6	Maximillian Wei Ang	Singapore	1:01.76	
28	5	9	Tamás Takács	Hungary	1:01.86	
29	4	9	Amro Al-Wir	Jordan	1:01.87	NR
30	5	7	André Klippenberg Grindheim	Norway	1:01.99	
31	4	7	Youssef El-Kamash	Egypt	1:02.04	
32	4	5	Julio Horrego	Honduras	1:02.07	
33	6	1	Volodymyr Lisovets	Ukraine	1:02.33	
34	4	2	Carles Coll	Spain	1:02.52	
35	3	4	Cai Bing-rong	Chinese Taipei	1:02.75	
36	3	6	Daniils Bobrovs	Latvia	1:02.85	
37	4	1	Taichi Vakasama	Fiji	1:02.86	
38	4	0	Adam Chillingworth	Hong Kong	1:02.91	
39	4	4	Phạm Thanh Bảo	Vietnam	1:03.19	
40	3	9	Adrian Robinson	Botswana	1:03.43	
41	3	3	Aibek Kamzenov	Kazakhstan	1:03.46	
42	5	0	Izaak Bastian	Bahamas	1:03.79	
43	3	7	Jonathan Cook	Philippines	1:03.95	
44	2	6	Julio Calero	Cuba	1:04.12	
45	2	4	Abobakr Abass	Sudan	1:04.13	
46	3	8	Rashed Al-Tarmoom	Kuwait	1:04.19	
47	3	1	Andres Martijena	Dominican Republic	1:04.24	
48	2	5	Tasi Limtiaco	Micronesia	1:04.63	
49	4	8	Édgar Crespo	Panama	1:05.09	
50	2	8	Jonathan Raharvel	Madagascar	1:05.13	
51	3	0	Giacomo Casadei	San Marino	1:05.17	
52	2	3	Kito Campbell	Jamaica	1:05.27	
53	2	2	Abdulaziz Al-Obaidly	Qatar	1:05.37	
54	2	1	Jonathan Chung Yee	Mauritius	1:06.04	
55	1	6	Saud Ghali	Bahrain	1:06.46	
56	2	7	Filipe Gomes	Malawi	1:06.57	
57	3	2	Sébastien Kouma	Mali	1:07.43	
58	1	3	Zandanbal Gunsennorov	Mongolia	1:07.79	
59	2	0	Kumaren Naidu	Zambia	1:11.40	
60	1	5	Jion Hosei	Palau	1:18.51	
	2	9	Ahmed Al-Hasani	Iraq	Did not start	
	3	5	Adriel Sanes	U.S. Virgin Islands	Disqualified	
	7	9	James Dergousoff	Canada	Disqualified	
	1	4	Daoud Ali	Djibouti	Disqualified	

=== Semifinals ===
The semifinals were started on 18 June at 18:53.

Rank	Heat	Lane	Name	Nationality	Time	Notes
1	1	5	Nicolò Martinenghi	Italy	58.46	Q
2	1	4	Nic Fink	United States	58.55	Q
3	2	4	Arno Kamminga	Netherlands	58.89	Q
4	2	7	James Wilby	Great Britain	59.23	Q
5	2	3	Yan Zibei	China	59.34	Q
6	2	2	Lucas Matzerath	Germany	59.35	Q
7	1	2	Zac Stubblety-Cook	Australia	59.51	Q
8	1	6	Andrius Šidlauskas	Lithuania	59.52	Q
9	2	5	Michael Andrew	United States	59.63	
10	2	6	Ryuya Mura	Japan	59.64	
11	1	1	Cho Sung-jae	South Korea	59.75	
12	2	8	Bernhard Reitshammer	Austria	1:00.03	
13	1	3	Caspar Corbeau	Netherlands	1:00.24	
14	1	8	Kristian Pitshugin	Israel	1:00.33	NR
15	1	7	Erik Persson	Sweden	1:00.38	
16	2	1	Matti Mattsson	Finland	1:00.66	

=== Final ===
The final was held on 19 June at 18:02.

Rank	Lane	Name	Nationality	Time	Notes
1st place, gold medalist(s)	4	Nicolò Martinenghi	Italy	58.26	NR
2nd place, silver medalist(s)	3	Arno Kamminga	Netherlands	58.62	
3rd place, bronze medalist(s)	5	Nic Fink	United States	58.65	
4	6	James Wilby	Great Britain	58.93	
5	2	Yan Zibei	China	59.22	
6	7	Lucas Matzerath	Germany	59.50	
7	1	Zac Stubblety-Cook	Australia	59.65	
8	8	Andrius Šidlauskas	Lithuania	59.80	
