= Jordan at the 2017 World Aquatics Championships =

- Flag of Jordan
- FINA code: JOR
- National federation: Jordan Swimming Federation
- Website: www.jsf.com.jo/en_home.asp

in Budapest, Hungary
- Competitors: 6 in 1 sport
- Medals: Gold 0 Silver 0 Bronze 0 Total 0

World Aquatics Championships appearances
- 1973; 1975; 1978; 1982; 1986; 1991; 1994; 1998; 2001; 2003; 2005; 2007; 2009; 2011; 2013; 2015; 2017; 2019; 2022; 2023; 2024

Jordan competed at the 2017 World Aquatics Championships in Budapest, Hungary from 14 July to 30 July.

== Swimming ==
Jordanian swimmers have achieved qualifying standards in the following events (up to a maximum of 2 swimmers in each event at the A-standard entry time, and 1 at the B-standard):

Men

Athlete	Event	Heat		Semifinal		Final	
Athlete	Event	Time	Rank	Time	Rank	Time	Rank
Amro Al-Wir	100 m breaststroke	1:05.70	61	did not advance			
Amro Al-Wir	200 m breaststroke	2:23.09	36	did not advance			
Khader Baqlah	200 m freestyle	1:47.68	19	did not advance			
Khader Baqlah	400 m freestyle	3:54.13	32	—		did not advance	
Mohammed Bedour	50 m freestyle	24.15	=80	did not advance			
Mohammed Bedour	100 m freestyle	52.68	71	did not advance			

Women

Athlete	Event	Heat		Semifinal		Final	
Athlete	Event	Time	Rank	Time	Rank	Time	Rank
Lara Aklouk	100 m butterfly	1:09.37	44	did not advance			
Lara Aklouk	200 m butterfly	2:32.35	34	did not advance			
Dara Al-Bakry	50 m freestyle	27.23	49	did not advance			
Dara Al-Bakry	200 m freestyle	2:10.62	42	did not advance			
Talita Baqlah	100 m freestyle	59.33	53	did not advance			
Talita Baqlah	50 m butterfly	28.22	=39	did not advance			

Mixed

Athlete	Event	Heat		Final	
Athlete	Event	Time	Rank	Time	Rank
Khader Baqlah; Mohammed Bedour; Dara Al-Bakry; Talita Baqlah	4×100 m freestyle relay	3:40.31	15	did not advance	
