= Swimming at the 2022 World Aquatics Championships – Men's 200 metre breaststroke =

Men's 200 metre breaststroke at the 2022 World Aquatics Championships
- Venue: Danube Arena
- Location: Budapest, Hungary
- Dates: 22 June (heats and semifinals); 23 June (final)
- Competitors: 44 from 40 nations
- Winning time: 2:07.07

Medalists
gold medal	Zac Stubblety-Cook	Australia
silver medal	Yu Hanaguruma	Japan
silver medal	Erik Persson	Sweden

The Men's 200 metre breaststroke competition at the 2022 World Aquatics Championships was held on 22 and 23 June 2022.

== Records ==
Prior to the competition, the existing world and championship records were as follows.

World record	Zac Stubblety-Cook (AUS)	2:05.95	Adelaide, Australia	19 May 2022
Competition record	Anton Chupkov (RUS)	2:06.12	Gwangju, South Korea	26 July 2019

== Results ==
=== Heats ===
The heats were started on 22 June at 09:50.

Rank	Heat	Lane	Name	Nationality	Time	Notes
1	5	4	Zac Stubblety-Cook	Australia	2:09.09	Q
2	5	6	Caspar Corbeau	Netherlands	2:09.15	Q
3	3	6	Charlie Swanson	United States	2:09.36	Q
4	3	5	Erik Persson	Sweden	2:09.58	Q
5	3	7	Anton McKee	Iceland	2:09.69	Q, NR
6	4	3	Yu Hanaguruma	Japan	2:09.86	Q
7	3	4	Matti Mattsson	Finland	2:10.05	Q
8	4	5	Ryuya Mura	Japan	2:10.20	Q
9	5	5	Nic Fink	United States	2:10.27	Q
10	4	4	Arno Kamminga	Netherlands	2:10.33	Q, WD
11	4	6	Cho Sung-jae	South Korea	2:10.69	Q
12	4	7	Dawid Wiekiera	Poland	2:10.86	Q
13	5	3	James Wilby	Great Britain	2:11.29	Q
14	5	7	Lyubomir Epitropov	Bulgaria	2:11.52	Q
15	5	1	Denis Petrashov	Kyrgyzstan	2:11.88	Q
16	3	3	Matthew Wilson	Australia	2:11.89	Q
17	3	0	Amro Al-Wir	Jordan	2:11.99	Q, NR
18	3	2	Antoine Viquerat	France	2:12.27	
19	3	1	Caio Pumputis	Brazil	2:12.72	
20	4	2	Andrius Šidlauskas	Lithuania	2:13.13	
21	2	7	Maksym Ovchinnikov	Ukraine	2:13.33	
22	5	2	Qin Haiyang	China	2:13.35	
23	2	3	James Dergousoff	Canada	2:13.89	
24	2	6	Daniils Bobrovs	Latvia	2:13.96	
25	3	8	Maximillian Wei Ang	Singapore	2:14.14	
26	5	8	Savvas Thomoglou	Greece	2:14.20	
27	2	5	Cai Bing-rong	Chinese Taipei	2:15.46	
28	2	8	Constantin Malachi	Moldova	2:16.25	
29	5	0	Phạm Thanh Bảo	Vietnam	2:17.34	
30	4	9	Taichi Vakasama	Fiji	2:17.49	
31	2	4	Bernhard Tyler Christianson	Panama	2:18.77	
32	2	9	Liam Davis	Zimbabwe	2:19.62	
33	2	1	Jonathan Cook	Philippines	2:19.95	
34	3	9	Adriel Sanes	U.S. Virgin Islands	2:20.41	
35	1	5	Abdulaziz Al-Obaidly	Qatar	2:21.82	
36	1	2	Saud Ghali	Bahrain	2:23.68	
37	1	4	Jonathan Chung Yee	Mauritius	2:24.36	
38	2	0	Arnoldo Herrera	Costa Rica	2:24.46	
39	1	6	Brandon Schuster	Samoa	2:25.04	
40	1	3	Andrej Stojanovski	North Macedonia	2:26.11	
	4	0	Adam Chillingworth	Hong Kong	Disqualified	
	4	1	Christopher Rothbauer	Austria	Disqualified	
	4	8	Carles Coll	Spain	Disqualified	
	5	9	Ron Polonsky	Israel	Disqualified	
	1	7	Luis Sebastian Weekes	Barbados	Did not start	
	2	2	André Klippenberg Grindheim	Norway	Did not start	

=== Semifinals ===
The semifinals were started on 22 June at 18:45.

Rank	Heat	Lane	Name	Nationality	Time	Notes
1	2	4	Zac Stubblety-Cook	Australia	2:06.72	Q
2	2	3	Anton McKee	Iceland	2:08.74	Q, NR
3	1	3	Yu Hanaguruma	Japan	2:08.75	Q
4	1	5	Erik Persson	Sweden	2:08.84	Q
5	2	6	Matti Mattsson	Finland	2:09.04	Q
6	1	4	Caspar Corbeau	Netherlands	2:09.17	Q
7	2	2	Nic Fink	United States	2:09.23	Q
8	1	6	Ryuya Mura	Japan	2:09.69	Q
9	1	2	Cho Sung-jae	South Korea	2:09.81	
10	1	7	James Wilby	Great Britain	2:09.85	
11	2	5	Charlie Swanson	United States	2:09.89	
12	1	1	Denis Petrashov	Kyrgyzstan	2:11.00	
13	1	8	Amro Al-Wir	Jordan	2:11.05	NR
14	2	1	Lyubomir Epitropov	Bulgaria	2:11.01	
15	2	8	Matthew Wilson	Australia	2:11.44	
–	2	7	Dawid Wiekiera	Poland	Disqualified	

=== Final ===
The final was held on 23 June at 19:28.

Rank	Lane	Name	Nationality	Time	Notes
1st place, gold medalist(s)	4	Zac Stubblety-Cook	Australia	2:07.07	
2nd place, silver medalist(s)	3	Yu Hanaguruma	Japan	2:08.38	
2nd place, silver medalist(s)	6	Erik Persson	Sweden	2:08.38	
4	8	Ryuya Mura	Japan	2:08.86	
5	1	Nic Fink	United States	2:09.05	
6	5	Anton McKee	Iceland	2:09.37	
7	7	Caspar Corbeau	Netherlands	2:09.62	
8	2	Matti Mattsson	Finland	2:09.65	
