= Jordan at the 2015 World Aquatics Championships =

- Flag of Jordan
- FINA code: JOR
- National federation: Jordan Swimming Federation
- Website: www.jsf.com.jo/en_home.asp

in Kazan, Russia
- Competitors: 6 in 1 sport
- Medals: Gold 0 Silver 0 Bronze 0 Total 0

World Aquatics Championships appearances
- 1973; 1975; 1978; 1982; 1986; 1991; 1994; 1998; 2001; 2003; 2005; 2007; 2009; 2011; 2013; 2015; 2017; 2019; 2022; 2023; 2024

Jordan competed at the 2015 World Aquatics Championships in Kazan, Russia from 24 July to 9 August 2015.

== Swimming ==
Jordanian swimmers have achieved qualifying standards in the following events (up to a maximum of 2 swimmers in each event at the A-standard entry time, and 1 at the B-standard):

Men

Athlete	Event	Heat		Semifinal		Final	
Athlete	Event	Time	Rank	Time	Rank	Time	Rank
Khader Baqlah	200 m freestyle	1:51.67	52	did not advance			
Khader Baqlah	400 m freestyle	3:58.71	52	—		did not advance	
Mohammed Bedour	100 m freestyle	53.53	83	did not advance			
Mohammed Bedour	100 m backstroke	1:02.33	61	did not advance			
Nazih Mezayek	50 m breaststroke	29.96	54	did not advance			
Nazih Mezayek	100 m breaststroke	1:08.22	67	did not advance			

Women

Athlete	Event	Heat		Semifinal		Final	
Athlete	Event	Time	Rank	Time	Rank	Time	Rank
Talita Baqlah	50 m freestyle	DSQ		did not advance			
Talita Baqlah	100 m butterfly	1:04.23	51	did not advance			
Rahaf Baqleh	100 m freestyle	1:00.81	73	did not advance			
Rahaf Baqleh	50 m backstroke	33.67	47	did not advance			
Lydia Musleh	200 m freestyle	2:09.74	56	did not advance			
Lydia Musleh	200 m individual medley	2:27.94	38	did not advance			

Mixed

Athlete	Event	Heat		Final	
Athlete	Event	Time	Rank	Time	Rank
Khader Baqlah; Mohammed Bedour; Rahaf Baqleh; Talita Baqlah	4×100 m freestyle relay	3:47.34	21	did not advance	
Mohammed Bedour; Lydia Musleh; Khader Baqlah; Talita Baqlah	4×100 m medley relay	4:19.71	23	did not advance	
