= Finland at the 2017 World Aquatics Championships =

- Flag of Finland
- FINA code: FIN
- National federation: Suomen Uimaliitto
- Website: www.uimaliitto.fi

in Budapest, Hungary
- Competitors: 11 in 2 sports
- Medals: Gold 0 Silver 0 Bronze 0 Total 0

World Aquatics Championships appearances
- 1973; 1975; 1978; 1982; 1986; 1991; 1994; 1998; 2001; 2003; 2005; 2007; 2009; 2011; 2013; 2015; 2017; 2019; 2022; 2023; 2024

Finland competed at the 2017 World Aquatics Championships in Budapest, Hungary from 14 to 30 July.

== Diving ==
Finland entered 3 divers (two male and one female).

Athlete	Event	Preliminaries		Semifinals		Final	
Athlete	Event	Points	Rank	Points	Rank	Points	Rank
Juho Junttila	Men's 1 m springboard	296.15	36	—		did not advance	
Jouni Kallunki	Men's 1 m springboard	245.10	47	—		did not advance	
Jouni Kallunki	Men's 3 m springboard	364.55	35	did not advance			
Roosa Kanerva	Women's 1 m springboard	207.00	35	—		did not advance	

== Swimming ==
Finnish swimmers have achieved qualifying standards in the following events (up to a maximum of 2 swimmers in each event at the A-standard entry time, and 1 at the B-standard):

Men

Athlete	Event	Heat		Semifinal		Final	
Athlete	Event	Time	Rank	Time	Rank	Time	Rank
Matias Koski	200 m freestyle	1:47.75	23	did not advance			
Ari-Pekka Liukkonen	50 m freestyle	22.12	13 Q	21.71	=5 Q	21.67	6
Ari-Pekka Liukkonen	100 m freestyle	49.79	40	did not advance			
Ari-Pekka Liukkonen	50 m breaststroke	27.66	21	did not advance			
Matti Mattsson	100 m breaststroke	1:01.92	36	did not advance			
Matti Mattsson	200 m breaststroke	2:12.66	22	did not advance			
Riku Pöytäkivi	50 m butterfly	23.91	=22	did not advance			
Riku Pöytäkivi	100 m butterfly	53.62	40	did not advance			

Women

Athlete	Event	Heat		Semifinal		Final	
Athlete	Event	Time	Rank	Time	Rank	Time	Rank
Mimosa Jallow	50 m freestyle	25.44	25	did not advance			
Mimosa Jallow	50 m backstroke	28.05	12 Q	27.95	13	did not advance	
Mimosa Jallow	100 m backstroke	1:01.33	23	did not advance			
Mimosa Jallow	50 m butterfly	26.89	27	did not advance			
Veera Kivirinta	50 m breaststroke	30.89	12 Q	30.98	14	did not advance	
Jenna Laukkanen	50 m breaststroke	30.82	10 Q	30.92	12	did not advance	
Jenna Laukkanen	100 m breaststroke	1:07.83	20	did not advance			
Jenna Laukkanen	200 m breaststroke	2:28.59	16 Q	2:27.77	16	did not advance	
Jenna Laukkanen	200 m individual medley	2:14.70	25	did not advance			
Lotta Nevalainen	100 m freestyle	56.31	31	did not advance			
Mimosa Jallow; Kaisia Kollanus; Jenna Laukkanen; Lotta Nevalainen	4 × 100 m medley relay	4:06.38	11	—		did not advance	
