= Kyrgyzstan at the 2019 World Aquatics Championships =

- Flag of Kyrgyzstan
- FINA code: KGZ
- National federation: Swimming Federation of the Republic of Kyrgyzstan

in Gwangju, South Korea
- Medals: Gold 0 Silver 0 Bronze 0 Total 0

World Aquatics Championships appearances
- 1994; 1998; 2001; 2003; 2005; 2007; 2009; 2011; 2013; 2015; 2017; 2019; 2022; 2023; 2024

Other related appearances
- Soviet Union (1973–1991)

Kyrgyzstan competed at the 2019 World Aquatics Championships in Gwangju, South Korea from 12 to 28 July.

== Swimming ==
Kyrgyzstan entered four swimmers.

Men

Athlete	Event	Heat		Semifinal		Final	
Athlete	Event	Time	Rank	Time	Rank	Time	Rank
Denis Petrashov	100 m breaststroke	1:00.94	28	did not advance			
Denis Petrashov	200 m breaststroke	2:11.65	24	did not advance			
Kirill Vais	50 m breaststroke	28.15	37	did not advance			

Women

Athlete	Event	Heat		Semifinal		Final	
Athlete	Event	Time	Rank	Time	Rank	Time	Rank
Anastasiia Filina	50 m freestyle	28.99	70	did not advance			
Anastasiia Filina	100 m freestyle	1:01.07	70	did not advance			
Elizaveta Rogozhnikova	200 m freestyle	2:15.46	53	did not advance			
Elizaveta Rogozhnikova	200 m backstroke	2:20.55	36	did not advance			
