= Swimming at the 2017 World Aquatics Championships – Men's 200 metre breaststroke =

Men's 200 metre breaststroke at the 2017 World Aquatics Championships
- Venue: Danube Arena
- Location: Budapest, Hungary
- Dates: 27 July (heats and semifinals); 28 July (final)
- Competitors: 40 from 35 nations
- Winning time: 2:06.96

Medalists
gold medal	Anton Chupkov	Russia
silver medal	Yasuhiro Koseki	Japan
bronze medal	Ippei Watanabe	Japan

The Men's 200 metre breaststroke competition at the 2017 World Championships was held on 27 and 28 July 2017.

== Records ==
Prior to the competition, the existing world and championship records were as follows.

World record	Ippei Watanabe (JPN)	2:06.67	Tokyo, Japan	29 January 2017
Competition record	Dániel Gyurta (HUN)	2:07.23	Barcelona, Spain	2 August 2013

The following new records were set during this competition.

Date	Event	Name	Nationality	Time	Record
27 July	Semifinal	Anton Chupkov	Russia	2:07.14	CR
28 July	Final	Anton Chupkov	Russia	2:06.96	CR

== Results ==
=== Heats ===
The heats were held on 27 July at 10:28.

Rank	Heat	Lane	Name	Nationality	Time	Notes
1	4	5	Anton Chupkov	Russia	2:08.23	Q
2	3	3	Ross Murdoch	Great Britain	2:08.98	Q
3	4	4	Ippei Watanabe	Japan	2:09.30	Q
4	4	6	Qin Haiyang	China	2:09.39	Q, WJ
5	3	4	Kevin Cordes	United States	2:09.47	Q
6	3	6	Luca Pizzini	Italy	2:09.86	Q
7	5	6	Nic Fink	United States	2:09.90	Q
8	5	2	Matthew Wilson	Australia	2:09.98	Q
9	4	2	Mao Feilian	China	2:10.01	Q
10	5	5	Dmitriy Balandin	Kazakhstan	2:10.18	Q
11	3	5	Erik Persson	Sweden	2:10.21	Q
12	5	4	Yasuhiro Koseki	Japan	2:10.38	Q
13	5	3	Marco Koch	Germany	2:10.40	Q
14	4	3	Ilya Khomenko	Russia	2:10.43	Q
15	3	7	Arno Kamminga	Netherlands	2:11.00	Q
15	4	8	Yannick Käser	Switzerland	2:11.00	Q, NR
17	3	2	Dániel Gyurta	Hungary	2:11.28	
18	5	7	James Wilby	Great Britain	2:11.51	
19	5	1	Carlos Claverie	Venezuela	2:11.71	
20	3	1	Nicholas Quinn	Ireland	2:12.15	
21	5	8	Giedrius Titenis	Lithuania	2:12.37	
22	4	7	Matti Mattsson	Finland	2:12.66	
23	5	0	Miguel de Lara	Mexico	2:13.35	
24	4	9	Ilya Shymanovich	Belarus	2:13.46	
25	4	0	Christopher Rothbauer	Austria	2:13.61	
26	4	1	Thiago Simon	Brazil	2:14.23	
27	3	8	Laurent Carnol	Luxembourg	2:14.87	
28	2	7	Chao Man Hou	Macau	2:15.41	
29	2	4	Lee Hsuan-yen	Chinese Taipei	2:15.94	
30	3	9	Daniils Bobrovs	Latvia	2:16.86	
31	2	6	Youssef El-Kamash	Egypt	2:17.43	
32	2	2	Denis Petrashov	Kyrgyzstan	2:18.43	
33	5	9	Kim Jae-youn	South Korea	2:18.65	
34	3	0	Jorge Murillo	Colombia	2:19.05	
35	2	1	Adriel Sanes	U.S. Virgin Islands	2:20.92	
36	2	0	Amro Al-Wir	Jordan	2:23.09	
37	2	8	Arnoldo Herrera	Costa Rica	2:24.57	
38	1	3	Santiago Saint-Upery	Uruguay	2:26.35	
39	1	4	Felipe Gomes	Malawi	2:28.94	
40	1	5	Otto Borgards	El Salvador	2:30.73	
	2	3	Wassim Elloumi	Tunisia	DNS	
	2	5	Ayrton Sweeney	South Africa	DNS	

=== Semifinals ===
The semifinals were held on 27 July at 18:14.

==== Semifinal 1 ====
Rank	Lane	Name	Nationality	Time	Notes
1	4	Ross Murdoch	Great Britain	2:07.72	Q
2	7	Yasuhiro Koseki	Japan	2:07.80	Q
3	1	Ilya Khomenko	Russia	2:08.58	Q
4	6	Matthew Wilson	Australia	2:08.64	Q
5	3	Luca Pizzini	Italy	2:08.95	
6	2	Dmitriy Balandin	Kazakhstan	2:09.69	
7	5	Qin Haiyang	China	2:10.14	
8	8	Yannick Käser	Switzerland	2:12.19	

==== Semifinal 2 ====
Rank	Lane	Name	Nationality	Time	Notes
1	4	Anton Chupkov	Russia	2:07.14	Q, CR, ER
2	5	Ippei Watanabe	Japan	2:07.44	Q
3	3	Kevin Cordes	United States	2:08.40	Q
4	6	Nic Fink	United States	2:08.80	Q
5	7	Erik Persson	Sweden	2:09.58	
6	1	Marco Koch	Germany	2:09.61	
7	2	Mao Feilian	China	2:09.63	
8	8	Arno Kamminga	Netherlands	2:09.94	NR

=== Final ===
The final was held on 28 July at 18:55.

Rank	Lane	Name	Nationality	Time	Notes
1st place, gold medalist(s)	4	Anton Chupkov	Russia	2:06.96	CR, ER
2nd place, silver medalist(s)	6	Yasuhiro Koseki	Japan	2:07.29	
3rd place, bronze medalist(s)	5	Ippei Watanabe	Japan	2:07.47	
4	3	Ross Murdoch	Great Britain	2:08.12	
5	8	Nic Fink	United States	2:08.56	
6	2	Kevin Cordes	United States	2:08.68	
7	7	Ilya Khomenko	Russia	2:09.18	
8	1	Matthew Wilson	Australia	2:10.37	
