= Kyrgyzstan at the 2017 World Aquatics Championships =

- Flag of Kyrgyzstan
- FINA code: KGZ
- National federation: Swimming Federation of the Republic of Kyrgyzstan

in Budapest, Hungary
- Competitors: 4 in 1 sport
- Medals: Gold 0 Silver 0 Bronze 0 Total 0

World Aquatics Championships appearances
- 1994; 1998; 2001; 2003; 2005; 2007; 2009; 2011; 2013; 2015; 2017; 2019; 2022; 2023; 2024

Other related appearances
- Soviet Union (1973–1991)

Kyrgyzstan competed at the 2017 World Aquatics Championships in Budapest, Hungary from 14 July to 30 July.

== Swimming ==
Kyrgyzstan has received a Universality invitation from FINA to send a maximum of four swimmers (two men and two women) to the World Championships.

Athlete	Event	Heat		Semifinal		Final	
Athlete	Event	Time	Rank	Time	Rank	Time	Rank
Denis Petrashov	Men's 100 m breaststroke	1:03.14	48	did not advance			
Denis Petrashov	Men's 200 m breaststroke	2:18.43	32	did not advance			
Kirill Vais	Men's 50 m breaststroke	28.61	45	did not advance			
Kristina Panasenko	Women's 200 m breaststroke	2:52.53	35	did not advance			
Dariya Talanova	Women's 50 m breaststroke	33.85	35	did not advance			
Dariya Talanova	Women's 100 m breaststroke	1:14.13	39	did not advance			
