= Kyrgyzstan at the 2023 World Aquatics Championships =

- Flag of Kyrgyzstan
- FINA code: KGZ
- National federation: Kyrgyz Republic Swimming Federation

in Fukuoka, Japan
- Competitors: 2 in 1 sport
- Medals: Gold 0 Silver 0 Bronze 0 Total 0

World Aquatics Championships appearances
- 1994; 1998; 2001; 2003; 2005; 2007; 2009; 2011; 2013; 2015; 2017; 2019; 2022; 2023; 2024

Other related appearances
- Soviet Union (1973–1991)

Kyrgyzstan is set to compete at the 2023 World Aquatics Championships in Fukuoka, Japan from 14 to 30 July.

== Swimming ==
Kyrgyzstan entered 2 swimmers.

Men

Athlete	Event	Heat		Semifinal		Final	
Athlete	Event	Time	Rank	Time	Rank	Time	Rank
Denis Petrashov	50 metre breaststroke	27.48	19	Did not advance			
Denis Petrashov	100 metre breaststroke	59.91 NR	11 Q	59.78 NR	13	Did not advance	
Denis Petrashov	200 metre breaststroke	Disqualified		Did not advance			

Women

Athlete	Event	Heat		Semifinal		Final	
Athlete	Event	Time	Rank	Time	Rank	Time	Rank
Anna Nikishkina	200 metre freestyle	2:10.81	52	Did not advance			
Anna Nikishkina	400 metre freestyle	4:36.12	39	—		Did not advance	
