= Kyrgyzstan at the 2015 World Aquatics Championships =

- Flag of Kyrgyzstan
- FINA code: KGZ
- National federation: Swimming Federation of the Republic of Kyrgyzstan

in Kazan, Russia
- Competitors: 4 in 1 sport
- Medals: Gold 0 Silver 0 Bronze 0 Total 0

World Aquatics Championships appearances
- 1994; 1998; 2001; 2003; 2005; 2007; 2009; 2011; 2013; 2015; 2017; 2019; 2022; 2023; 2024

Other related appearances
- Soviet Union (1973–1991)

Kyrgyzstan competed at the 2015 World Aquatics Championships in Kazan, Russia from 24 July to 9 August 2015.

== Swimming ==
Kyrgyz swimmers have achieved qualifying standards in the following events (up to a maximum of 2 swimmers in each event at the A-standard entry time, and 1 at the B-standard):

Men

Athlete	Event	Heat		Semifinal		Final	
Athlete	Event	Time	Rank	Time	Rank	Time	Rank
Stanislav Karnaukhov	50 m freestyle	23.92	57	did not advance			
Stanislav Karnaukhov	100 m freestyle	51.96	70	did not advance			
Denis Petrashov	200 m breaststroke	2:22.84	50	did not advance			
Ramazan Taimatov	50 m breaststroke	30.40	57	did not advance			
Ramazan Taimatov	100 m breaststroke	1:06.49	61	did not advance			

Women

Athlete	Event	Heat		Semifinal		Final	
Athlete	Event	Time	Rank	Time	Rank	Time	Rank
Dariya Talanova	50 m breaststroke	33.89	48	did not advance			
Dariya Talanova	100 m breaststroke	1:13.68	49	did not advance			
Dariya Talanova	200 m breaststroke	2:37.04	42	did not advance			
