= Finland at the 2022 World Aquatics Championships =

- Flag of Finland
- World Aquatics code: FIN
- National federation: Suomen Uimaliitto
- Website: www.uimaliitto.fi

in Budapest, Hungary
- Medals: Gold 0 Silver 0 Bronze 0 Total 0

World Aquatics Championships appearances
- 1973; 1975; 1978; 1982; 1986; 1991; 1994; 1998; 2001; 2003; 2005; 2007; 2009; 2011; 2013; 2015; 2017; 2019; 2022; 2023; 2024

Finland competed at the 2022 World Aquatics Championships in Budapest, Hungary from 17 June to 3 July.

== Diving ==
Finland entered two divers.

Men

Athlete	Event	Preliminaries		Semifinals		Final	
Athlete	Event	Points	Rank	Points	Rank	Points	Rank
Juho Junttila	1 m springboard	273.90	39	—		did not advance	

Women

Athlete	Event	Preliminaries		Semifinals		Final	
Athlete	Event	Points	Rank	Points	Rank	Points	Rank
Lauren Hallaselkä	1 m springboard	222.30	23	—		did not advance	
Lauren Hallaselkä	3 m springboard	250.80	20	did not advance			

== Swimming ==
Finland has entered three swimmers.

Men

Athlete	Event	Heat		Semifinal		Final	
Athlete	Event	Time	Rank	Time	Rank	Time	Rank
Matti Mattsson	100 m breaststroke	1:00.37	=13 Q	1:00.66	16	did not advance	
Matti Mattsson	200 m breaststroke	2:10.05	7 Q	2:09.04	5 Q	2:09.65	8

Women

Athlete	Event	Heat		Semifinal		Final	
Athlete	Event	Time	Rank	Time	Rank	Time	Rank
Mimosa Jallow	50 m backstroke	28.06	11 Q	27.99	=12	did not advance	
Mimosa Jallow	100 m backstroke	1:01.01	15 Q	1:00.68	13	did not advance	
Mimosa Jallow	50 m butterfly	26.99	27	did not advance			
Veera Kivirinta	50 m breaststroke	30.66	8 Q	30.76	12	did not advance	
Veera Kivirinta	100 m breaststroke	1:09.26	27	did not advance			
