= Finland at the 2013 World Aquatics Championships =

Finland at the 2011 World Aquatics Championships
- Flag of Finland
- FINA code: FIN
- National federation: Suomen Uimaliitto
- Website: www.uimaliitto.fi

in Shanghai, China
- Competitors: 13 in 2 sports
- Medals Ranked 28th: Gold 0 Silver 0 Bronze 1 Total 1

World Aquatics Championships appearances
- 1973; 1975; 1978; 1982; 1986; 1991; 1994; 1998; 2001; 2003; 2005; 2007; 2009; 2011; 2013; 2015; 2017; 2019; 2022; 2023; 2024

Finland competed at the 2013 World Aquatics Championships in Barcelona, Spain between 19 July and 4 August 2013.

== Medalists ==
Medal	Name	Sport	Event	Date
Bronze	Matti Mattsson	Swimming	Men's 200 m breaststroke	2 August

== Diving ==
Finland has qualified one athlete in diving.

Women

Athlete	Event	Preliminaries		Semifinals		Final	
Athlete	Event	Points	Rank	Points	Rank	Points	Rank
Tiia Kivelä	1 m springboard	215.95	26	—		Did not advance	
Tiia Kivelä	3 m springboard	220.15	30	Did not advance			

== Swimming ==
Finnish swimmers earned qualifying standards in the following events (up to a maximum of 2 swimmers in each event at the A-standard entry time, and 1 at the B-standard):

Men

Athlete	Event	Heat		Semifinal		Final	
Athlete	Event	Time	Rank	Time	Rank	Time	Rank
Eetu Karvonen	50 m breaststroke	27.58	16 Q	DSQ		Did not advance	
Eetu Karvonen	100 m breaststroke	1:01.77	=34	Did not advance			
Matias Koski	200 m freestyle	1:49.37	30	Did not advance			
Matias Koski	400 m freestyle	3:51.04	17	—		Did not advance	
Matias Koski	800 m freestyle	7:54.70 NR	9	—		Did not advance	
Matias Koski	1500 m freestyle	15:13.97	15	—		Did not advance	
Ari-Pekka Liukkonen	50 m freestyle	22.38	19	Did not advance			
Matti Mattsson	200 m breaststroke	2:10.16 NR	4 Q	2:09.96 NR	6 Q	2:08.95 NR	3rd place, bronze medalist(s)
Riku Pöytäkivi	50 m butterfly	24.45	37	Did not advance			

Women

Athlete	Event	Heat		Semifinal		Final	
Athlete	Event	Time	Rank	Time	Rank	Time	Rank
Anni Alitalo	50 m backstroke	28.62	=17 Q*	28.61	16	Did not advance	
Veera Kiviranta	50 m breaststroke	31.66	22	Did not advance			
Tanja Kylliäinen	200 m individual medley	2:20.09	36	Did not advance			
Tanja Kylliäinen	400 m individual medley	4:55.54	29	—		Did not advance	
Jenna Laukkanen	100 m breaststroke	1:08.59	=20	Did not advance			
Jenna Laukkanen	200 m breaststroke	2:28.04 NR	15 Q	2:29.86	16	Did not advance	
Anna Mäkinen	50 m breaststroke	32.02	29	Did not advance			
Emilia Pikkarainen	50 m butterfly	DNS		Did not advance			
Emilia Pikkarainen	100 m butterfly	1:00.47	28	Did not advance			
Hanna-Maria Seppälä	50 m freestyle	25.20	15 Q	25.06	14	Did not advance	
Hanna-Maria Seppälä	100 m freestyle	55.34	20	Did not advance			
Anni Alitalo; Tanja Kylliäinen; Jenna Laukkanen; Hanna-Maria Seppälä	4×100 m medley relay	4:09.10	14	—		Did not advance	
