= Jordan at the 2023 World Aquatics Championships =

- Flag of Jordan
- FINA code: JOR
- National federation: Jordan Swimming Federation
- Website: jsf.com.jo

in Fukuoka, Japan
- Competitors: 4 in 1 sport
- Medals: Gold 0 Silver 0 Bronze 0 Total 0

World Aquatics Championships appearances
- 1973; 1975; 1978; 1982; 1986; 1991; 1994; 1998; 2001; 2003; 2005; 2007; 2009; 2011; 2013; 2015; 2017; 2019; 2022; 2023; 2024

Jordan is set to compete at the 2023 World Aquatics Championships in Fukuoka, Japan from 14 to 30 July.

== Swimming ==
Jordan entered 4 swimmers.

Men

Athlete	Event	Heat		Semifinal		Final	
Athlete	Event	Time	Rank	Time	Rank	Time	Rank
Amro Al-Wir	100 metre breaststroke	1:01.80	34	Did not advance			
Amro Al-Wir	200 metre breaststroke	2:12.90	27	Did not advance			
Mohammed Bedour	50 metre freestyle	23.59	66	Did not advance			
Mohammed Bedour	100 metre freestyle	52.69	79	Did not advance			

Women

Athlete	Event	Heat		Semifinal		Final	
Athlete	Event	Time	Rank	Time	Rank	Time	Rank
Tara Aloul	100 metre breaststroke	1:16.45	54	Did not advance			
Tara Aloul	200 metre breaststroke	2:44.88	33	Did not advance			
Mariam Mithqal	50 metre freestyle	28.02	64	Did not advance			
Mariam Mithqal	100 metre freestyle	1:01.69	54	Did not advance			
