= Finland at the 2024 World Aquatics Championships =

- Flag of Finland
- FINA code: FIN
- National federation: Finnish Swimming Federation
- Website: uimaliitto.fi (in Finnish)

in Doha, Qatar
- Competitors: 10 in 3 sports
- Medals: Gold 0 Silver 0 Bronze 0 Total 0

World Aquatics Championships appearances
- 1973; 1975; 1978; 1982; 1986; 1991; 1994; 1998; 2001; 2003; 2005; 2007; 2009; 2011; 2013; 2015; 2017; 2019; 2022; 2023; 2024

Finland competed at the 2024 World Aquatics Championships in Doha, Qatar from 2 to 18 February.

== Competitors ==
The following is the list of competitors in the Championships.

Sport	Men	Women	Total
Artistic swimming	0	2	2
Diving	0	1	1
Swimming	3	4	7
Total	3	7	10

== Artistic swimming ==
Women

Athlete	Event	Preliminaries		Final	
Athlete	Event	Points	Rank	Points	Rank
Pinja Kekki	Solo technical routine	160.7867	25	Did not advamce	
Sini Tuuli	Solo free routine	127.6854	24	Did not advamce	

== Diving ==
Women

Athlete	Event	Preliminaries		Semifinals		Final	
Athlete	Event	Points	Rank	Points	Rank	Points	Rank
Lauren Hallaselkä	1 m springboard	229.30	16	—		Did not advance	
Lauren Hallaselkä	3 m springboard	228.05	28	Did not advance			

== Swimming ==
Finland entered 7 swimmers.

Men

Athlete	Event	Heat		Semifinal		Final	
Athlete	Event	Time	Rank	Time	Rank	Time	Rank
Olli Kokko	50 metre breaststroke	28.17	25	Did not advance			
Kalle Aleksanteri Makinen	50 metre freestyle	22.81	37	Did not advance			
Matti Mattsson	100 metre breaststroke	1:00.57	19	Did not advance			
Matti Mattsson	200 metre breaststroke	2:09.15	1 Q	2:09.43	4 Q	2:09.80	6

Women

Athlete	Event	Heat		Semifinal		Final	
Athlete	Event	Time	Rank	Time	Rank	Time	Rank
Ida Hulkko	50 metre breaststroke	30.36	5 Q	30.69	8 Q	30.60	5
Ida Hulkko	100 metre breaststroke	1:08.21	19	Did not advance			
Ida Hulkko	200 metre breaststroke	2:33.27	23	Did not advance			
Veera Kivirinta	50 metre breaststroke	30.53	6 Q	30.57	6 Q	30.73	7
Laura Lahtinen	100 metre butterfly	1:00.06	22	Did not advance			
Laura Lahtinen	200 metre butterfly	2:12.06	14 Q	2:14.12	16	Did not advance	
Fanny Teijonsalo	50 metre freestyle	25.82	33	Did not advance			
Fanny Teijonsalo	50 metre backstroke	29.41	31	Did not advance			
