= Kyrgyzstan at the 2022 World Aquatics Championships =

- Flag of Kyrgyzstan
- FINA code: KGZ
- National federation: Swimming Federation of the Republic of Kyrgyzstan

in Budapest, Hungary
- Competitors: 2 in 1 sport
- Medals: Gold 0 Silver 0 Bronze 0 Total 0

World Aquatics Championships appearances
- 1994; 1998; 2001; 2003; 2005; 2007; 2009; 2011; 2013; 2015; 2017; 2019; 2022; 2023; 2024

Other related appearances
- Soviet Union (1973–1991)

Kyrgyzstan competed at the 2022 World Aquatics Championships in Budapest, Hungary from 18 June to 3 July.

== Swimming ==
Kyrgyzstani swimmers have achieved qualifying standards in the following events.

Athlete	Event	Heat		Semifinal		Final	
Athlete	Event	Time	Rank	Time	Rank	Time	Rank
Ramazan Omarov	Men's 200 m freestyle	1:56.22	51	did not advance			
Ramazan Omarov	Men's 400 m freestyle	4:16.22	39	-		did not advance	
Denis Petrashov	Men's 50 m breaststroke	27.89	20	did not advance			
Denis Petrashov	Men's 100 m breaststroke	1:00.86	20	did not advance			
Denis Petrashov	Men's 200 m breaststroke	2:11.88	15 Q	2:11.00	12	did not advance	
