= List of Jordanian records in swimming =

The Jordanian records in swimming are the fastest ever performances of swimmers from Jordan, which are recognised and ratified by the Jordan Swimming Federation (JSF).

All records were set in finals unless noted otherwise.

== Long Course (50 m) ==
=== Men ===
| Event | Time | | Name | Club | Date | Meet | Location | Ref |
|---|---|---|---|---|---|---|---|---|
| 50 m freestyle | 23.03 | | Khader Baqlah | Jordan | 20 November 2016 | Asian Championships | Tokyo, Japan | |
| 100 m freestyle | 49.10 | | Khader Baqlah | Jordan | 23 August 2018 | Asian Games | Jakarta, Indonesia | |
| 200 m freestyle | 1:46.77 | | Khader Baqlah | Jordan | 19 August 2018 | Asian Games | Jakarta, Indonesia | |
| 400 m freestyle | 3:51.59 | h | Khader Baqlah | Jordan | 21 July 2019 | World Championships | Gwangju, South Korea | |
| 800 m freestyle | 8:30.42 | † | Khader Baqlah | Jordan | 14 July 2018 | Arab Championships | Rades, Tunisia | |
| 1500 m freestyle | 15:50.20 | | Khader Baqlah | Jordan | 14 July 2018 | Arab Championships | Rades, Tunisia | |
| 50 m backstroke | 27.18 | | Laith Sabbah | Jordan | 7 July 2023 (Note: by official result source; 10 July 2023 by JSF source, a typo) | Pan Arab Games | Oran, Algeria | |
| 100 m backstroke | 57.34 | | Laith Sabbah | Jordan | 5 July 2023 (Note: by official result source; 10 July 2023 by JSF source, a typo) | Pan Arab Games | Oran, Algeria | |
| 200 m backstroke | 2:05.62 | | Laith Sabbah | Hamilton Aquatics | 25 June 2023 | Hamilton Aquatics Summer Sizzler | Dubai, United Arab Emirates | |
| 50 m breaststroke | 28.39 | sf | Amro Al-Wir | Jordan | 13 August 2022 | Islamic Solidarity Games | Konya, Turkey | |
| 100 m breaststroke | 1:01.56 | | Amro Al-Wir | Jordan | 5 July 2023 (Note: by official result source; 10 July 2023 by JSF source, a typo) | Pan Arab Games | Oran, Algeria | |
| 200 m breaststroke | 2:11.05 | sf | Amro Al-Wir | Jordan | 22 June 2022 | World Championships | Budapest, Hungary | |
| 50m butterfly | 24.84 | | Ziyad Al Salous | - | 11 July 2024 | Jordanian Summer Championship | Amman, Jordan | |
| 100m butterfly | 53.94 | | Khader Baqlah | Jordan | 12 July 2018 | Arab Championships | Rades, Tunisia | |
| 200m butterfly | 2:01.43 | b | Khader Baqlah | Jordan | 7 November 2019 | TYR Pro Swim Series | Greensboro, United States | |
| 200m individual medley | 2:03.48 | | Khader Baqlah | University of Florida | 19 May 2019 | Atlanta Classic Swim Meet | Atlanta, United States | |
| 400m individual medley | 4:37.14 | | Mohammad Al-Hodhod | - | 1 August 2013 | MD Maryland LSC | United States | |
| 4×100m freestyle relay | 3:28.03 | | Emad Zapen (51.21); Adnan Al Abdallat (52.59); Mohammed Bedour (52.28); Laith Sabbah (51.95) | Jordan | 5 July 2023 | Pan Arab Games | Oran, Algeria | |
| 4×200m freestyle relay | 7:50.03 | | Laith Sabbah (1:56.04); Adnan Al Abdallat (1:57.58); Ziyad Al Salous (1:59.68); Amro Al-Wir (1:56.73) | Jordan | 8 July 2023 | Pan Arab Games | Oran, Algeria | |
| 4×100m medley relay | 3:46.92 | | Laith Sabbah (58.35); Amro Al-Wir (1:01.92); Ziyad Al Salous (55.56); Emad Zapen (51.09) | Jordan | 10 July 2023 | Pan Arab Games | Oran, Algeria | |

Legend: # – Record awaiting ratification by Jordan Swimming Federation; WR – World record; AS – Asian record;
Records not set in finals: h – heat; sf – semifinal; r – relay 1st leg; rh – relay heat 1st leg; b – B final; † – en route to final mark; so – swim-off; tt – time trial

=== Women ===
| Event | Time | | Name | Club | Date | Meet | Location | Ref |
|---|---|---|---|---|---|---|---|---|
| 50 m freestyle | 26.13 | h | Talita Baqlah | Jordan | 27 July 2019 | World Championships | Gwangju, South Korea | |
| 100 m freestyle | 57.67 | | Talita Baqlah | Jordan | 5 September 2014 | Arab Championships | Casablanca, Morocco | |
| 200 m freestyle | 2:07.50 | c | Lydia Musleh | Jordan | 14 March 2014 | Speedo Champions Series | Plantation, United States | |
| 400 m freestyle | 4:28.46 | | Karin Belbeisi | Hamilton Aquatics | 14 June 2024 (Note: by official result source; 15 June 2024 by JSF source, a typo) | Singapore Championships | Singapore, Singapore | |
| 800 m freestyle | 9:11.92 | | Karin Belbeisi | Hamilton Aquatics | 16 February 2025 | Dubai Open Championships | Dubai, United Arab Emirates | |
| 1500 m freestyle | 18:20.95 | | Karin Belbeisi | Jordan | 12 January 2024 (Note: by official result source; 13 January 2024 by JSF source, a typo) | Arab Age Group Championships | Doha, Qatar | |
| 50m backstroke | 31.06 | | Talita Baqlah | Jordan | 12 July 2018 | Arab Championships | Rades, Tunisia | |
| 100m backstroke | 1:07.81 | | Sara Hayajna | Jordan | 21 December 2011 | Pan Arab Games | Doha, Qatar | |
| 200m backstroke | 2:24.34 | | Sara Hayajna | Jordan | 18 December 2011 | Pan Arab Games | Doha, Qatar | |
| 50m breaststroke | 34.22 | h | Tara Aloul | Hamilton Aquatics Dubai | 3 April 2026 | Dubai International Aquatic Championships | Dubai, United Arab Emirates | |
| 100m breaststroke | 1:14.38 | | Tara Aloul | Hamilton Aquatics | 10 December 2023 | AD Swim For Life Championship | Abu Dhabi, United Arab Emirates | |
| 200m breaststroke | 2:41.24 | | Tara Aloul | Hamilton Aquatics Dubai | 3 May 2026 | Dubai International Aquatic Championships | Dubai, United Arab Emirates | |
| 50m butterfly | 28.17 | | Talita Baqlah | Jordan | 26 April 2014 | Dubai International Aquatic Championship | Dubai, United Arab Emirates | |
| 100m butterfly | 1:03.11 | | Talita Baqlah | Jordan | 2 April 2015 | Arab Age Group Championships | Dubai, United Arab Emirates | |
| 200m butterfly | 2:22.01 | | Karin Belbeisi | Speedo Swim Squads | 3 May 2026 | Speedo Invitational Meet | Dubai, United Arab Emirates | |
| 200m individual medley | 2:22.71 | | Karin Belbeisi | Jordan | 17 July 2026 | Asian Age Group Championships | Samutprakan, Thailand | |
| 400m individual medley | 5:03.91 | | Karin Belbeisi | Hamilton Aquatics | 13 June 2024 (Note: by official result source; 15 June 2024 by JSF source, a typo) | Singapore Championships | Singapore, Singapore | |
| 4×100m freestyle relay | 4:04.39 | | | Jordan | 30 August 2012 | Arab Championships | Amman, Jordan | |
| 4×200m freestyle relay | 9:10.96 | | | Jordan | 28 August 2012 | Arab Championships | Amman, Jordan | |
| 4×100m medley relay | 4:38.71 | | | Jordan | 17 December 2011 | Pan Arab Games | Doha, Qatar | |

Legend: # – Record awaiting ratification by Jordan Swimming Federation; WR – World record; AS – Asian record;
Records not set in finals: h – heat; sf – semifinal; r – relay 1st leg; rh – relay heat 1st leg; b – B final; † – en route to final mark; so – swim-off; tt – time trial

=== Mixed relay ===
| Event | Time | | Name | Club | Date | Meet | Location | Ref |
|---|---|---|---|---|---|---|---|---|
| 4×100 m freestyle relay | 3:40.31 | h | Khader Baqlah (49.46); Mohammed Bedour (50.47); Talita Baqlah (1:00.69); Dara Al-Bakry (59.69) | Jordan | 29 July 2017 | World Championships | Budapest, Hungary | |
| 4×100 m medley relay | 4:07.77 | | Mohammed Omar Bedour (1:00.02); Amro El Wir (1:03.20); Talita Baqlah (1:03.88); Rahaf Baqlah (1:00.67) | Jordan | 14 July 2018 | Arab Championships | Rades, Tunisia | |

Legend: # – Record awaiting ratification by Jordan Swimming Federation; WR – World record; AS – Asian record;
Records not set in finals: h – heat; so – swim-off

== Short Course (25 m) ==
=== Men ===
| Event | Time | | Name | Club | Date | Meet | Location | Ref |
|---|---|---|---|---|---|---|---|---|
| 50m freestyle | 22.29 | | Mohammed Bedour | Jordan | 26 October 2021 | Arab Championships | Abu Dhabi, United Arab Emirates | |
| 100m freestyle | 47.61 | r | Khader Baqlah | Cali Condors | 21 November 2020 | International Swimming League | Budapest, Hungary | |
| 200m freestyle | 1:43.40 | | Khader Baqlah | Cali Condors | 9 November 2020 | International Swimming League | Budapest, Hungary | |
| 400m freestyle | 3:42.09 | | Khader Baqlah | Cali Condors | 9 November 2020 | International Swimming League | Budapest, Hungary | |
| 800m freestyle | 8:27.10 | | Laith Sabbah | Hamilton Aquatics | 23 October 2022 | Hamilton Aquatics Championships | Dubai, United Arab Emirates | |
| 1500m freestyle | 15:48.57 | | Khader Baqlah | Jordan | 7 December 2014 | World Championships | Doha, Qatar | |
| 50m backstroke | 25.52 | | Mohammed Bedour | Jordan | 24 October 2021 | Arab Championships | Abu Dhabi, United Arab Emirates | |
| 100m backstroke | 55.90 | | Laith Sabbah | Hamilton Aquatics | 27 November 2022 | Speedo Invitational Championships | Dubai, United Arab Emirates | |
| 200m backstroke | 2:01.91 | | Laith Sabbah | Hamilton Aquatics | 23 October 2022 | Hamilton Aquatics Championships | Dubai, United Arab Emirates | |
| 50m breaststroke | 28.04 | | Ziyad Al Salous | - | 9 March 2024 | U SPORTS Championships | Pointe-Claire, Canada | |
| 100m breaststroke | 1:00.03 | h | Amro Al-Wir | Jordan | 11 December 2024 | World Championships | Budapest, Hungary | |
| 200m breaststroke | 2:12.03 | h | Amro Al-Wir | Jordan | 13 December 2024 | World Championships | Budapest, Hungary | |
| 50m butterfly | 24.23 | | Mohammed Bedour | - | 7 March 2019 | Jordanian Winter Championships | Amman, Jordan | |
| 100m butterfly | 53.70 | | Ziyad Al Salous | - | 9 March 2024 | U SPORTS Championships | Pointe-Claire, Canada | |
| 200m butterfly | 1:59.13 | | Khader Baqlah | Cali Condors | 17 September 2021 | International Swimming League | Naples, Italy | |
| 100m individual medley | 57.44 | | Ziyad Al Salous | Jordan | 27 October 2021 | Arab Championships | Abu Dhabi, United Arab Emirates | |
| 200m individual medley | 2:03.92 | h | Adnan Al Abdallat | Stipendium Hungaricum | 5 November 2025 (Note: by official result source; 8 November 2025 by JSF source, a typo) | Hungarian Championships | Debrecen, Hungary | |
| 400m individual medley | 4:32.66 | | Laith Sabbah | Hamilton Aquatics | 23 October 2022 | Hamilton Aquatics Championships | Dubai, United Arab Emirates | |
| 4×50m freestyle relay | 1:39.35 | | | Jordan | 6 November 2009 | Asian Indoor Games | Hanoi, Vietnam | |
| 4×100m freestyle relay | 3:27.66 | | | - | 10 May 2024 | Jordan Open Winter Championship | Amman, Jordan | |
| 4×200m freestyle relay | 8:01.58 | | Adnan Omar (1:56.34); Ghalib Mohammad (2:02.60); Mohammed Raed (2:01.50); Ali Ehab (2:01.14) | Jordan | 25 October 2021 | Arab Championships | Abu Dhabi, United Arab Emirates | |
| 4×50m medley relay | 1:46.91 | h | Mohammed Bedour (25.80); Amro Al-Wir (29.22); Khaled Awadallah (26.02); Sayf Al-Hatabeh (25.87) | Jordan | 22 September 2017 | Asian Indoor and Martial Arts Games | Ashgabat, Turkmenistan | |
| 4×100m medley relay | 3:58.40 | | | Jordan | 7 November 2009 | Asian Indoor Games | Hanoi, Vietnam | |

Legend: # – Record awaiting ratification by Jordan Swimming Federation; WR – World record; AS – Asian record;
Records not set in finals: h – heat; sf – semifinal; r – relay 1st leg; rh – relay heat 1st leg; b – B final; † – en route to final mark; so – swim-off; tt – time trial

=== Women ===
| Event | Time | | Name | Club | Date | Meet | Location | Ref |
|---|---|---|---|---|---|---|---|---|
| 50 m freestyle | 25.81 | | Talita Baqlah | - | 18 May 2021 | Winter National Team Timing | Amman, Jordan | |
| 100 m freestyle | 57.80 | | Talita Baqlah | - | 26 April 2018 | Jordan Open Winter Championships | Amman, Jordan | |
| 200 m freestyle | 2:06.73 | | Talita Baqlah | - | 14 March 2014 | Jordan Winter Age Group Championships | Amman, Jordan | |
| 400 m freestyle | 4:23.65 | | Karin Belbeisi | Hamilton Aquatics | 24 November 2024 | Speedo Invitational Meet | Dubai, United Arab Emirates | |
| 800 m freestyle | 9:07.32 | | Karin Belbeisi | Hamilton Aquatics | 19 October 2024 | Hamilton Aquatics Championships | Abu Dhabi, United Arab Emirates | |
| 1500 m freestyle | 18:17.27 | | Miriam Hatamleh | - | 28 April 2012 | Jordan Winter Age Group Championships | Amman, Jordan | |
| 50m backstroke | 30.74 | h | Sara Hyajna | Jordan | 18 December 2010 | World Championships | Dubai, United Arab Emirates | |
| 100m backstroke | 1:05.45 | | Sara Hyajna | - | 4 February 2011 | Jordan Open Winter Championships | Amman, Jordan | |
| 200m backstroke | 2:20.97 | | Sara Hyajna | - | 25 March 2011 | Jordan Open Winter Championships | Amman, Jordan | |
| 50m breaststroke | 33.52 | h | Tara Aloul | Hamilton Aquatics | 12 December 2025 | Swim England National Winter Championships | Sheffield, United Kingdom | |
| 100m breaststroke | 1:11.82 | h | Tara Aloul | Hamilton Aquatics | 11 December 2025 | Swim England National Winter Championships | Sheffield, United Kingdom | |
| 200m breaststroke | 2:33.40 | h | Tara Aloul | Hamilton Aquatics | 13 December 2025 | Swim England National Winter Championships | Sheffield, United Kingdom | |
| 50m butterfly | 27.82 | | Talita Baqlah | - | 1 May 2019 | Jordan Open Winter Championships | Amman, Jordan | |
| 100m butterfly | 1:03.08 | | Talita Baqlah | - | 1 May 2019 | Jordan Open Winter Championships | Amman, Jordan | |
| 200m butterfly | 2:25.23 | h | Lara Aklouk | Jordan | 12 December 2018 | World Championships | Hangzhou, China | |
| 100m individual medley | 1:04.81 | | Tara Aloul | Hamilton Aquatics | 13 December 2025 | Swim England National Winter Championships | Sheffield, United Kingdom | |
| 200m individual medley | 2:18.88 | h | Tara Aloul | Hamilton Aquatics | 11 December 2025 | Swim England National Winter Championships | Sheffield, United Kingdom | |
| 400m individual medley | 4:51.53 | | Karin Belbeisi | Hamilton Aquatics | 23 November 2024 | Speedo Invitational Meet | Dubai, United Arab Emirates | |
| 4×50m freestyle relay | 1:52.29 | | | Jordan | 6 November 2009 | Asian Indoor Games | Hanoi, Vietnam | |
| 4×100m freestyle relay | 4:08.62 | | | Jordan | 5 November 2009 | Asian Indoor Games | Hanoi, Vietnam | |
| 4×200m freestyle relay | 9:36.11 | | Rama Ammouri (2:30.48); Rabab Barhoush (2:27.00); Mariam Mithqal (2:10.84); Naia Hanayneh (2:27.79) | Jordan | 25 October 2021 | Arab Championships | Abu Dhabi, United Arab Emirates | |
| 4×50m medley relay | 2:06.71 | | | Jordan | 4 November 2009 | Asian Indoor Games | Hanoi, Vietnam | |
| 4×100m medley relay | 4:38.76 | | | Jordan | 7 November 2009 | Asian Indoor Games | Hanoi, Vietnam | |

Legend: # – Record awaiting ratification by Jordan Swimming Federation; WR – World record; AS – Asian record;
Records not set in finals: h – heat; sf – semifinal; r – relay 1st leg; rh – relay heat 1st leg; b – B final; † – en route to final mark; so – swim-off; tt – time trial

=== Mixed relay ===
| Event | Time | | Name | Club | Date | Meet | Location | Ref |
|---|---|---|---|---|---|---|---|---|
| 4×50 m freestyle relay | 1:45.17 | h | Mohammed Bedour (23.28); Amro Al-Wir (24.69); Lara Aklouk (29.31); Leedia Alsafadi (27.89) | Jordan | 12 December 2018 | World Championships | Hangzhou, China | |
| 4×50 m medley relay | 1:53.43 | h | Adnan Al-Abdallat (28.52); Amro Al-Wir (27.58); Tara Aloul (28.96); Karin Belbeisi (28.37) | Jordan | 11 December 2024 | World Championships | Budapest, Hungary | |
| 4×100 m medley relay | 4:05.75 | h | Adnan Al-Abdallat (59.44); Amro Al-Wir (59.91); Tara Aloul (1:05.65); Karin Belbeisi (1:00.75) | Jordan | 14 December 2024 | World Championships | Budapest, Hungary | |

Legend: # – Record awaiting ratification by Jordan Swimming Federation;
Records not set in finals: h – heat; so – swim-off
