= Kyrgyzstan at the 2024 World Aquatics Championships =

- Flag of Kyrgyzstan
- FINA code: KGZ
- National federation: Kyrgyz Republic Swimming Federation

in Doha, Qatar
- Competitors: 2 in 1 sport
- Medals: Gold 0 Silver 0 Bronze 0 Total 0

World Aquatics Championships appearances
- 1994; 1998; 2001; 2003; 2005; 2007; 2009; 2011; 2013; 2015; 2017; 2019; 2022; 2023; 2024

Other related appearances
- Soviet Union (1973–1991)

Kyrgyzstan competed at the 2024 World Aquatics Championships in Doha, Qatar from 2 to 18 February.

== Competitors ==
The following is the list of competitors in the Championships.

Sport	Men	Women	Total
Swimming	1	1	2
Total	1	1	2

== Swimming ==
Kyrgyzstan entered 2 swimmers.

Men

Athlete	Event	Heat		Semifinal		Final	
Athlete	Event	Time	Rank	Time	Rank	Time	Rank
Denis Petrashov	50 metre breaststroke	27.10	9 Q	27.20	13	Did not advance	
Denis Petrashov	100 metre breaststroke	1:00.47	16 Q	59.82	13	Did not advance	
Denis Petrashov	200 metre breaststroke	2:12.23	12 Q	2:10.81	10	Did not advance	

Women

Athlete	Event	Heat		Semifinal		Final	
Athlete	Event	Time	Rank	Time	Rank	Time	Rank
Elizaveta Pecherskikh	50 metre freestyle	27.00	54	Did not advance			
Elizaveta Pecherskikh	100 metre backstroke	1:05.68	44	Did not advance			
