= Jordan at the 2019 World Aquatics Championships =

- Flag of Jordan
- FINA code: JOR
- National federation: Jordan Swimming Federation
- Website: www.jsf.com.jo/en_home.asp

in Gwangju, South Korea
- Competitors: 4 in 1 sport
- Medals: Gold 0 Silver 0 Bronze 0 Total 0

World Aquatics Championships appearances
- 1973; 1975; 1978; 1982; 1986; 1991; 1994; 1998; 2001; 2003; 2005; 2007; 2009; 2011; 2013; 2015; 2017; 2019; 2022; 2023; 2024

Jordan competed at the 2019 World Aquatics Championships in Gwangju, South Korea from 12 to 28 July.

== Swimming ==
Jordan entered four swimmers.

Men

Athlete	Event	Heat		Semifinal		Final	
Athlete	Event	Time	Rank	Time	Rank	Time	Rank
Amro Al-Wir	100 m breaststroke	1:02.75	50	did not advance			
Amro Al-Wir	200 m breaststroke	2:14.82	35	did not advance			
Khader Baqlah	100 m freestyle	49.46	34	did not advance			
Khader Baqlah	200 m freestyle	1:47.72	22	did not advance			
Khader Baqlah	400 m freestyle	3:51.59	21	—		did not advance	

Women

Athlete	Event	Heat		Semifinal		Final	
Athlete	Event	Time	Rank	Time	Rank	Time	Rank
Leedia Al-Safadi	200 m freestyle	2:13.19	49	did not advance			
Leedia Al-Safadi	100 m backstroke	1:10.11	57	did not advance			
Talita Baqlah	50 m freestyle	26.13	39	did not advance			
Talita Baqlah	100 m freestyle	58.06	48	did not advance			

Mixed

Athlete	Event	Heat		Final	
Athlete	Event	Time	Rank	Time	Rank
Khader Baqlah; Amro Al-Wir; Leedia Al-Safadi; Talita Baqlah	4×100 m freestyle relay	3:48.35	27	did not advance	
Leedia Al-Safadi; Amro Al-Wir; Khader Baqlah; Talita Baqlah	4×100 m medley relay	4:08.54	25	did not advance	
