= Swimming at the 2024 World Aquatics Championships – Men's 200 metre breaststroke =

Men's 200 metre breaststroke at the Swimming at the 2024 World Aquatics Championships
- Venue: Aspire Dome
- Location: Doha, Qatar
- Dates: 15 February (heats and semifinals); 16 February (final)
- Competitors: 34 from 32 nations
- Winning time: 2:07.94

Medalists
gold medal	Dong Zhihao	China
silver medal	Caspar Corbeau	Netherlands
bronze medal	Nic Fink	United States

The Men's 200 metre breaststroke competition at the 2024 World Aquatics Championships was held on 15 and 16 February 2024.

== Qualification ==
Each National Federation was permitted to enter a maximum of two qualified athletes in each individual event, but only if both of them had attained the "A" standard qualification time at approved qualifying events. For this event, the "A" standard qualification time was 2:10.32. Federations could enter one athlete into the event if they met the "B" standard qualification time. For this event, the "B" standard qualification time was 2:14.88. Athletes could also enter the event if they had met an "A" or "B" standard in a different event and their Federation had not entered anyone else. Additional considerations applied to Federations who had few swimmers enter through the standard qualification times. Federations in this category could at least enter two men and two women into the competition, all of whom could enter into up to two events.

== Records ==
Prior to the competition, the existing world and championship records were as follows.

World record	Qin Haiyang (CHN)	2:05.48	Fukuoka, Japan	28 July 2023
Competition record	Qin Haiyang (CHN)	2:05.48	Fukuoka, Japan	28 July 2023

== Results ==
=== Heats ===
The heats were started on 15 February at 10:28.

Rank	Heat	Lane	Name	Nationality	Time	Notes
1	2	3	Matti Mattsson	Finland	2:09.15	Q
2	4	2	Lyubomir Epitropov	Bulgaria	2:10.57	Q
3	3	3	Ikuru Hiroshima	Japan	2:10.73	Q
4	4	4	Caspar Corbeau	Netherlands	2:10.85	Q
5	2	5	Erik Persson	Sweden	2:10.94	Q
6	3	5	Nic Fink	United States	2:11.00	Q
7	3	4	Dong Zhihao	China	2:11.13	Q
8	4	5	Arno Kamminga	Netherlands	2:11.22	Q
9	2	4	Jake Foster	United States	2:11.27	Q
10	3	2	Maksym Ovchinnikov	Ukraine	2:11.55	Q
11	2	2	Adam Chillingworth	Hong Kong	2:11.98	Q
12	3	6	Denis Petrashov	Kyrgyzstan	2:12.23	Q
13	4	6	James Dergousoff	Canada	2:12.34	Q
14	2	7	Lee Sang-hoon	South Korea	2:12.43	Q
15	4	3	Miguel de Lara	Mexico	2:12.50	Q
16	2	6	Carles Coll	Spain	2:12.72	Q
17	4	1	Eoin Corby	Ireland	2:13.10	
18	3	1	Vojtěch Netrh	Czech Republic	2:13.83	
19	4	7	Andrius Šidlauskas	Lithuania	2:14.28	
20	4	8	Xavier Ruiz	Puerto Rico	2:14.71	
21	3	8	Daniils Bobrovs	Latvia	2:15.25	
22	2	8	Matthew Randle	South Africa	2:16.10	
23	3	0	Denis Svet	Moldova	2:16.98	
24	4	0	Vicente Villanueva	Chile	2:17.45	
25	3	7	Phạm Thanh Bảo	Vietnam	2:18.58	
26	2	0	Liam Davis	Zimbabwe	2:18.89	
27	4	9	Giacomo Casadei	San Marino	2:19.60	
28	1	6	Abobakr Abass	Sudan	2:20.80	
29	1	5	Saud Ghali	Bahrain	2:21.94	NR
30	2	9	Jacob Story	Cook Islands	2:22.66	
31	2	1	Jorge Murillo	Colombia	2:22.90	
32	1	4	Luis Weekes	Barbados	2:23.02	
33	3	9	Jonathan Chung	Mauritius	2:26.00	
34	1	3	Caio Lobo	Mozambique	2:29.27	NR

=== Semifinals ===
The semifinals were held on 15 February at 19:43.

Rank	Heat	Lane	Name	Nationality	Time	Notes
1	2	2	Jake Foster	United States	2:08.78	Q
2	2	6	Dong Zhihao	China	2:09.16	Q
3	1	5	Caspar Corbeau	Netherlands	2:09.34	Q
4	2	4	Matti Mattsson	Finland	2:09.43	Q
4	2	5	Ikuru Hiroshima	Japan	2:09.43	Q
6	1	3	Nic Fink	United States	2:09.87	Q
7	2	3	Erik Persson	Sweden	2:10.04	Q
8	1	6	Arno Kamminga	Netherlands	2:10.30	Q
9	1	8	Carles Coll	Spain	2:10.77	
10	1	7	Denis Petrashov	Kyrgyzstan	2:10.81	
11	1	4	Lyubomir Epitropov	Bulgaria	2:10.89	
12	1	2	Maksym Ovchinnikov	Ukraine	2:11.82	
13	1	1	Lee Sang-hoon	South Korea	2:11.87	
14	2	7	Adam Chillingworth	Hong Kong	2:12.14	
15	2	8	Miguel de Lara	Mexico	2:12.58	
16	2	1	James Dergousoff	Canada	2:12.59	

=== Final ===
The final was held on 16 February at 20:08.

Rank	Lane	Name	Nationality	Time	Notes
1st place, gold medalist(s)	5	Dong Zhihao	China	2:07.94	
2nd place, silver medalist(s)	3	Caspar Corbeau	Netherlands	2:08.24	
3rd place, bronze medalist(s)	7	Nic Fink	United States	2:08.85	
4	4	Jake Foster	United States	2:09.31	
5	2	Ikuru Hiroshima	Japan	2:09.37	
6	6	Matti Mattsson	Finland	2:09.80	
7	8	Arno Kamminga	Netherlands	2:10.06	
8	1	Erik Persson	Sweden	2:10.21	

== Sources ==
- "Competition Regulations" (PDF). World Aquatics. Archived (PDF) from the original on 15 February 2026.
