= Swimming at the 2024 World Aquatics Championships – Men's 50 metre breaststroke =

Men's 50 metre breaststroke at the Swimming at the 2024 World Aquatics Championships
- Venue: Aspire Dome
- Location: Doha, Qatar
- Dates: 13 February (heats and semifinals); 14 February (final)
- Competitors: 57 from 54 nations
- Winning time: 26.32

Medalists
gold medal	Sam Williamson	Australia
silver medal	Nicolò Martinenghi	Italy
bronze medal	Nic Fink	United States

The Men's 50 metre breaststroke competition at the 2024 World Aquatics Championships was held on 13 and 14 February 2024.

== Qualification ==
Each National Federation was permitted to enter a maximum of two qualified athletes in each individual event, but only if both of them had attained the "A" standard qualification time at approved qualifying events. For this event, the "A" standard qualification time was 27.33 seconds. Federations could enter one athlete into the event if they met the "B" standard qualification time. For this event, the "B" standard qualification time was 28.29. Athletes could also enter the event if they had met an "A" or "B" standard in a different event and their Federation had not entered anyone else. Additional considerations applied to Federations who had few swimmers enter through the standard qualification times. Federations in this category could at least enter two men and two women into the competition, all of whom could enter into up to two events.

== Records ==
Prior to the competition, the existing world and championship records were as follows.

World record	Adam Peaty (GBR)	25.95	Budapest, Hungary	25 July 2017
Competition record	Adam Peaty (GBR)	25.95	Budapest, Hungary	25 July 2017

== Results ==
=== Heats ===
The heats were held on 13 February at 09:32.

Rank	Heat	Lane	Name	Nationality	Time	Notes
1	5	4	Nic Fink	United States	26.66	Q
1	6	6	Ilya Shymanovich	Neutral Independent Athletes	26.66	Q
3	6	4	Sam Williamson	Australia	26.69	Q
4	4	4	Nicolò Martinenghi	Italy	26.75	Q
5	4	6	Peter John Stevens	Slovenia	26.79	Q
6	4	5	Melvin Imoudu	Germany	26.91	Q
7	6	3	Michael Andrew	United States	26.94	Q
8	6	5	Simone Cerasuolo	Italy	27.00	Q
9	6	7	Denis Petrashov	Kyrgyzstan	27.10	Q
10	5	6	Caspar Corbeau	Netherlands	27.11	Q
11	4	3	Mikel Schreuders	Aruba	27.18	Q
12	5	5	Adam Peaty	Great Britain	27.23	Q
13	5	3	Lucas Matzerath	Germany	27.40	Q
14	6	2	Bernhard Reitshammer	Austria	27.47	Q
15	5	8	Jan Kałusowski	Poland	27.50	Q
16	4	2	Arkadios Aspougalis	Greece	27.62	Q
17	5	2	Emre Sakçı	Turkey	27.69	
18	6	8	Darragh Greene	Ireland	27.76	
19	4	9	Ronan Wantenaar	Namibia	27.81	NR
20	6	1	Miguel de Lara	Mexico	27.89	
21	4	8	Nicholas Lia	Norway	27.97	
22	4	1	James Dergousoff	Canada	28.08	
23	5	7	Tonislav Sabev	Bulgaria	28.13	
23	6	9	Chao Man Hou	Macau	28.13	
25	6	0	Olli Kokko	Finland	28.17	
26	5	9	Uroš Živanović	Serbia	28.27	
27	3	3	Jadon Wuilliez	Antigua and Barbuda	28.35	
28	3	5	Likhith Selvaraj	India	28.38	
28	5	0	Jorge Murillo	Colombia	28.38	
30	3	0	Alexandre Grand'Pierre	Haiti	28.39	
31	5	1	Andrius Šidlauskas	Lithuania	28.47	
32	3	2	Arsen Kozhakhmetov	Kazakhstan	28.59	
33	3	1	Adrian Robinson	Botswana	28.60	
34	2	6	Abdul Aziz Al-Obaidly	Qatar	28.62	
34	4	0	Maksym Ovchinnikov	Ukraine	28.62	
36	2	4	Patrick Pelegrina	Andorra	28.68	
37	3	4	Muhammad Raharjo	Indonesia	28.75	
37	3	6	Panayiotis Panaretos	Cyprus	28.75	
39	3	8	Amro Al-Wir	Jordan	28.81	
40	3	7	Wu Chun-feng	Chinese Taipei	28.86	
41	2	3	Matthew Lawrence	Mozambique	29.01	
42	3	9	Jonathan Raharvel	Madagascar	29.02	
43	2	5	Tasi Limtiaco	Federated States of Micronesia	29.06	
44	2	2	Ashot Chakhoyan	Armenia	29.38	
45	2	7	Jayden Loran	Curaçao	29.78	
46	1	0	Rashed Al-Tarmoom	Kuwait	29.95	
47	2	1	Omar Al-Hammadi	United Arab Emirates	31.16	
48	2	0	Chadd Ng	Eswatini	31.53	
49	1	6	Fahim Anwari	Afghanistan	31.83	
50	1	4	Ghaith Hussein	Iraq	31.95	
51	2	8	Sébastien Kouma	Mali	31.99	
52	1	8	Mubal Azzam Ibrahim	Maldives	33.24	NR
53	2	9	Jion Hosei	Palau	33.61	
54	1	5	Ethan Alimanya	Tanzania	34.26	
55	1	9	Pap Jonga	Gambia	35.01	
56	1	2	Yves Munyu	Democratic Republic of the Congo	35.62	
57	1	7	Refiloe Chopho	Lesotho	38.00	
	4	7	Choi Dong-yeol	South Korea	Disqualified	
	1	1	Higinio Ndong	Equatorial Guinea	Did not start	
	1	3	Ibrahim Kamara	Sierra Leone	Did not start	

=== Semifinals ===
The semifinals were held on 13 February at 19:34.

Rank	Heat	Lane	Name	Nationality	Time	Notes
1	2	5	Sam Williamson	Australia	26.41	Q, OC
2	1	5	Nicolò Martinenghi	Italy	26.65	Q
3	2	4	Nic Fink	United States	26.77	Q
4	1	7	Adam Peaty	Great Britain	26.85	Q
5	1	6	Simone Cerasuolo	Italy	26.98	Q
6	2	1	Lucas Matzerath	Germany	27.01	Q
7	2	3	Peter John Stevens	Slovenia	27.04	Q
8	2	7	Mikel Schreuders	Aruba	27.05	Q
9	1	3	Melvin Imoudu	Germany	27.06	
10	1	4	Ilya Shymanovich	Neutral Independent Athletes	27.07	
11	1	8	Arkadios Aspougalis	Greece	27.18	
11	2	6	Michael Andrew	United States	27.18	
13	2	2	Denis Petrashov	Kyrgyzstan	27.20	
14	1	1	Bernhard Reitshammer	Austria	27.25	
15	1	2	Caspar Corbeau	Netherlands	27.30	
16	2	8	Jan Kałusowski	Poland	27.38	

=== Final ===
The final was started on 14 February at 20:01.

Rank	Lane	Name	Nationality	Time	Notes
1st place, gold medalist(s)	4	Sam Williamson	Australia	26.32	OC
2nd place, silver medalist(s)	5	Nicolò Martinenghi	Italy	26.39	
3rd place, bronze medalist(s)	3	Nic Fink	United States	26.49	
4	6	Adam Peaty	Great Britain	26.77	
5	7	Lucas Matzerath	Germany	26.80	
6	2	Simone Cerasuolo	Italy	26.93	
7	8	Mikel Schreuders	Aruba	26.97	
8	1	Peter John Stevens	Slovenia	27.07	

== Sources ==
- "Competition Regulations" (PDF). World Aquatics. Archived (PDF) from the original on 15 February 2026.
