= Finland at the 2015 World Aquatics Championships =

- Flag of Finland
- World Aquatics code: FIN
- National federation: Suomen Uimaliitto
- Website: www.uimaliitto.fi

in Kazan, Russia
- Competitors: 15 in 2 sports
- Medals: Gold 0 Silver 0 Bronze 0 Total 0

World Aquatics Championships appearances
- 1973; 1975; 1978; 1982; 1986; 1991; 1994; 1998; 2001; 2003; 2005; 2007; 2009; 2011; 2013; 2015; 2017; 2019; 2022; 2023; 2024; 2025

Finland competed at the 2015 World Aquatics Championships in Kazan, Russia from 24 July to 9 August 2015.

== Diving ==
Finnish divers qualified for the individual spots and the synchronized teams at the World Championships.

Men

Athlete	Event	Preliminaries		Semifinals		Final	
Athlete	Event	Points	Rank	Points	Rank	Points	Rank
Jouni Kallunki	1 m springboard	296.60	28	—N/a		Did not advance	
Jouni Kallunki	3 m springboard	391.20	28	Did not advance			

Women

Athlete	Event	Preliminaries		Semifinals		Final	
Athlete	Event	Points	Rank	Points	Rank	Points	Rank
Taina Karvonen	1 m springboard	227.30	23	—N/a		Did not advance	
Iira Laatunen	1 m springboard	229.65	20	—N/a		Did not advance	
Taina Karvonen; Iira Laatunen	3 m synchronized springboard	230.88	16	—N/a		Did not advance	

== Swimming ==
Finnish swimmers have achieved qualifying standards in the following events (up to a maximum of 2 swimmers in each event at the A-standard entry time, and 1 at the B-standard): Swimmers must qualify at the 2015 Finnish Grand Prix series (for pool events) to confirm their places for the Worlds.

Twelve Finnish swimmers (four men and eight women) have been selected to the nation's official roster at the World Championships, including four-time Olympian Hanna-Maria Seppälä and 2013 World bronze medalist Matti Mattsson.

Men

Athlete	Event	Heat		Semifinal		Final	
Athlete	Event	Time	Rank	Time	Rank	Time	Rank
Sami Aaltomaa	50 m breaststroke	27.99	=23	Did not advance			
Matias Koski	200 m freestyle	1:51.00	47	Did not advance			
Matias Koski	400 m freestyle	3:52.86	40	—N/a		Did not advance	
Matias Koski	800 m freestyle	8:07.28	31	—N/a		Did not advance	
Matias Koski	1500 m freestyle	DNS		—N/a		Did not advance	
Ari-Pekka Liukkonen	50 m freestyle	22.54	22	Did not advance			
Ari-Pekka Liukkonen	100 m freestyle	50.64	48	Did not advance			
Matti Mattsson	100 m breaststroke	1:01.44	30	Did not advance			
Matti Mattsson	200 m breaststroke	2:09.89	6 Q	2:10.51	12	Did not advance	

Women

Athlete	Event	Heat		Semifinal		Final	
Athlete	Event	Time	Rank	Time	Rank	Time	Rank
Mimosa Jallow	50 m backstroke	DSQ		Did not advance			
Mimosa Jallow	100 m backstroke	1:01.10	20	Did not advance			
Veera Kiivirinta	50 m breaststroke	31.65	=26	Did not advance			
Jenna Laukkanen	50 m breaststroke	30.79	8 Q	31.18	15	Did not advance	
Jenna Laukkanen	100 m breaststroke	1:07.58 NR	16 Q	1:07.60	14	Did not advance	
Jenna Laukkanen	200 m breaststroke	2:25.91 NR	16 Q	2:25.45 NR	15	Did not advance	
Tessa Nurminen	50 m freestyle	26.23	48	Did not advance			
Emilia Pikkarainen	100 m butterfly	1:00.16	34	Did not advance			
Hanna-Maria Seppälä	100 m freestyle	55.65	30	Did not advance			
Fanny Teijonsalo	50 m butterfly	27.49	36	Did not advance			
Hanna-Maria Seppälä; Mimosa Jallow; Roosa Mört; Fanny Teijonsalo	4 × 100 m freestyle relay	DSQ		—N/a		Did not advance	
Mimosa Jallow; Jenna Laukkanen; Emilia Pikkarainen; Hanna-Maria Seppälä	4 × 100 m medley relay	4:02.30	13	—N/a		Did not advance	

Mixed

Athlete	Event	Heat		Final	
Athlete	Event	Time	Rank	Time	Rank
Mimosa Jallow; Sami Aaltomaa; Emilia Pikkarainen; Ari-Pekka Liukkonen	4 × 100 m medley relay	3:55.37	11	Did not advance	
