= Jordan at the 2024 World Aquatics Championships =

- Flag of Jordan
- FINA code: JOR
- National federation: Jordan Swimming Federation
- Website: jsf.com.jo

in Doha, Qatar
- Competitors: 5 in 2 sports
- Medals: Gold 0 Silver 0 Bronze 0 Total 0

World Aquatics Championships appearances
- 1973; 1975; 1978; 1982; 1986; 1991; 1994; 1998; 2001; 2003; 2005; 2007; 2009; 2011; 2013; 2015; 2017; 2019; 2022; 2023; 2024

Jordan competed at the 2024 World Aquatics Championships in Doha, Qatar from 2 to 18 February.

== Competitors ==
The following is the list of competitors in the Championships.

Sport	Men	Women	Total
Artistic swimming	0	1	1
Swimming	2	2	4
Total	2	3	5

== Artistic swimming ==
Women

Athlete	Event	Preliminaries		Final	
Athlete	Event	Points	Rank	Points	Rank
Yasmina Rushaidat	Solo free routine	77.2979	31	Did not advance	

== Swimming ==
Jordan entered 4 swimmers.

Men

Athlete	Event	Heat		Semifinal		Final	
Athlete	Event	Time	Rank	Time	Rank	Time	Rank
Amro Al-Wir	50 metre breaststroke	28.81	39	Did not advance			
Amro Al-Wir	100 metre breaststroke	1:03.72	48	Did not advance			
Emad Addin Zapen	50 metre freestyle	23.45	48	Did not advance			
Emad Addin Zapen	100 metre freestyle	51.53	49	Did not advance			

Women

Athlete	Event	Heat		Semifinal		Final	
Athlete	Event	Time	Rank	Time	Rank	Time	Rank
Tara Aloul	100 metre breaststroke	1:15.87	45	Did not advance			
Tara Aloul	200 metre breaststroke	2:43.10	27	Did not advance			
Karin Belbeisi	400 metre freestyle	Disqualified		—		Did not advance	
Karin Belbeisi	400 metre individual medley	5:20.71	21	—		Did not advance	
