= Swimming at the 2017 World Aquatics Championships – Women's 200 metre breaststroke =

Women's 200 metre breaststroke at the 2017 World Aquatics Championships
- Venue: Danube Arena
- Location: Budapest, Hungary
- Dates: 27 July (heats and semifinals); 28 July (final)
- Competitors: 36 from 32 nations
- Winning time: 2:19.64

Medalists
gold medal	Yuliya Yefimova	Russia
silver medal	Bethany Galat	United States
bronze medal	Shi Jinglin	China

The Women's 200 metre breaststroke competition at the 2017 World Championships was held on 27 and 28 July 2017.

== Records ==
Prior to the competition, the existing world and championship records were as follows.

World record	Rikke Møller Pedersen (DEN)	2:19.11	Barcelona, Spain	1 August 2013
Competition record	Rikke Møller Pedersen (DEN)	2:19.11	Barcelona, Spain	1 August 2013

== Results ==
=== Heats ===
The heats were held on 27 July at 10:10.

Rank	Heat	Lane	Name	Nationality	Time	Notes
1	3	3	Molly Renshaw	Great Britain	2:24.03	Q
2	4	5	Lilly King	United States	2:24.28	Q
3	3	4	Taylor McKeown	Australia	2:24.31	Q
4	2	3	Jessica Vall	Spain	2:24.41	Q
5	2	5	Bethany Galat	United States	2:24.56	Q
6	3	6	Kierra Smith	Canada	2:24.57	Q
7	2	4	Rikke Møller Pedersen	Denmark	2:24.69	Q
8	4	7	Martina Moravčíková	Czech Republic	2:25.26	Q, NR
9	2	2	Ashley McGregor	Canada	2:25.31	Q
10	4	3	Shi Jinglin	China	2:25.39	Q
11	4	4	Yuliya Yefimova	Russia	2:25.63	Q
12	4	6	Reona Aoki	Japan	2:25.93	Q
13	3	7	Back Su-yeon	South Korea	2:26.45	Q
14	3	5	Jocelyn Ulyett	Great Britain	2:26.50	Q
15	3	2	Satomi Suzuki	Japan	2:26.78	Q
16	4	2	Jenna Laukkanen	Finland	2:28.59	Q
17	2	6	Viktoriya Zeynep Güneş	Turkey	2:28.68	
18	2	1	Esther González	Mexico	2:28.71	
19	4	8	Sophie Hansson	Sweden	2:28.81	
20	3	1	Victoria Kaminskaya	Portugal	2:29.18	
21	4	1	Macarena Ceballos	Argentina	2:29.34	
22	2	7	Dalma Sebestyén	Hungary	2:29.35	
23	3	0	Kaylene Corbett	South Africa	2:31.36	
24	3	8	Andrea Podmaníková	Slovakia	2:32.63	
25	4	0	Natasha Lloyd	New Zealand	2:33.93	
26	2	0	Mercedes Toledo	Venezuela	2:35.20	
27	2	8	Rebecca Kamau	Kenya	2:36.99	
28	3	9	Alina Bulmag	Moldova	2:37.42	
29	4	9	Alexandra Schegoleva	Cyprus	2:38.60	
30	1	2	Nguyễn Thị Nhất Lam	Vietnam	2:45.25	
31	1	3	Honia Ibrahim	Iraq	2:45.37	
32	1	5	Rusudan Goginashvili	Georgia	2:45.52	
33	1	4	Kiah Borg	Namibia	2:48.48	
34	2	9	Nawapas Pisanuwong	Thailand	2:49.09	
35	1	7	Kristina Panasenko	Kyrgyzstan	2:52.53	
36	1	6	Tilali Scanlan	American Samoa	3:04.65	

=== Semifinals ===
The semifinals were held on 27 July at 18:50.

==== Semifinal 1 ====
Rank	Lane	Name	Nationality	Time	Notes
1	2	Shi Jinglin	China	2:23.17	Q
2	3	Kierra Smith	Canada	2:23.18	Q
3	5	Jessica Vall	Spain	2:23.49	Q
4	4	Lilly King	United States	2:23.81	Q
5	1	Jocelyn Ulyett	Great Britain	2:23.82	
6	7	Reona Aoki	Japan	2:24.42	
7	6	Martina Moravčíková	Czech Republic	2:25.67	
8	8	Jenna Laukkanen	Finland	2:27.77	

==== Semifinal 2 ====
Rank	Lane	Name	Nationality	Time	Notes
1	7	Yuliya Yefimova	Russia	2:21.49	Q
2	3	Bethany Galat	United States	2:21.86	Q
3	5	Taylor McKeown	Australia	2:22.10	Q
4	4	Molly Renshaw	Great Britain	2:23.51	Q
5	6	Rikke Møller Pedersen	Denmark	2:24.51	
6	8	Satomi Suzuki	Japan	2:25.60	
7	2	Ashley McGregor	Canada	2:25.75	
8	1	Back Su-yeon	South Korea	2:26.37	

=== Final ===
The final was held on 28 July at 18:25.

Rank	Lane	Name	Nationality	Time	Notes
1st place, gold medalist(s)	4	Yuliya Yefimova	Russia	2:19.64	
2nd place, silver medalist(s)	5	Bethany Galat	United States	2:21.77	
3rd place, bronze medalist(s)	6	Shi Jinglin	China	2:21.93	
4	8	Lilly King	United States	2:22.11	
5	2	Kierra Smith	Canada	2:22.23	
6	1	Molly Renshaw	Great Britain	2:22.96	
7	3	Taylor McKeown	Australia	2:23.06	
8	7	Jessica Vall	Spain	2:23.29	
