= Swimming at the 2019 World Aquatics Championships – Men's 400 metre freestyle =

Men's 400 metre freestyle at the 2019 World Aquatics Championships
- Venue: Nambu University Municipal Aquatics Center
- Location: Gwangju, South Korea
- Dates: 21 July (heats and final)
- Competitors: 47 from 42 nations
- Winning time: 3:42.44

Medalists
gold medal	Sun Yang	China
silver medal	Mack Horton	Australia
bronze medal	Gabriele Detti	Italy

The Men's 400 metre freestyle competition at the 2019 World Championships was held on 21 July 2019. The three-time defending champion was Sun Yang, and he successfully defended his title for a record-breaking 4th consecutive victory in the world championships in this event. He became the third man to win an event 4 times at the world championships after Grant Hackett in the 1500 meter freestyle and Ryan Lochte in the 200 meter individual medley.

== Records ==
Prior to the competition, the existing world and championship records were as follows.

World record	Paul Biedermann (GER)	3:40.07	Rome, Italy	26 July 2009
Competition record	Paul Biedermann (GER)	3:40.07	Rome, Italy	26 July 2009

== Results ==
=== Heats ===
The heats were held at 10:16.

Rank	Heat	Lane	Name	Nationality	Time	Notes
1	5	4	Sun Yang	China	3:44.10	Q
2	5	5	Danas Rapšys	Lithuania	3:44.31	Q
3	5	3	Jack McLoughlin	Australia	3:44.79	Q
4	4	4	Gabriele Detti	Italy	3:45.49	Q
5	4	5	Mack Horton	Australia	3:45.51	Q
6	4	3	Zane Grothe	United States	3:45.83	Q
7	5	2	Marco De Tullio	Italy	3:45.99	Q
8	4	1	Ji Xinjie	China	3:46.34	Q
9	5	6	Aleksandr Krasnykh	Russia	3:46.65	
10	5	7	Henrik Christiansen	Norway	3:46.99	
11	4	6	Martin Malyutin	Russia	3:47.43	
12	4	8	Anton Ipsen	Denmark	3:48.50	
13	4	7	Felix Auböck	Austria	3:48.78	
14	5	8	Wojciech Wojdak	Poland	3:48.81	
15	4	9	Luiz Altamir Melo	Brazil	3:48.87	
16	3	6	Dimitrios Negris	Greece	3:50.81	
17	5	1	Daniel Jervis	Great Britain	3:50.90	
18	3	5	Zac Reid	New Zealand	3:51.25	
19	3	7	Kregor Zirk	Estonia	3:51.30	NR
20	5	9	Antonio Djakovic	Switzerland	3:51.51	
21	2	4	Khader Baqlah	Jordan	3:51.59	NR
22	5	0	Lee Ho-joon	South Korea	3:51.89	
23	4	0	Marwan El-Kamash	Egypt	3:52.51	
24	3	4	Welson Sim	Malaysia	3:52.85	
25	4	2	Grant Shoults	United States	3:52.96	
26	3	8	Richard Nagy	Slovakia	3:53.38	
27	2	6	Erge Can Gezmiş	Turkey	3:54.01	
28	3	2	Denis Loktev	Israel	3:54.53	
29	2	7	Igor Mogne	Mozambique	3:54.90	
30	2	5	Cheuk Ming Ho	Hong Kong	3:55.05	
31	3	3	Marcelo Acosta	El Salvador	3:55.06	
32	2	1	Christian Bayo	Puerto Rico	3:55.33	
33	3	1	Nguyễn Hữu Kim Sơn	Vietnam	3:55.59	
34	3	9	Glen Lim Jun Wei	Singapore	3:55.60	
35	2	2	Wesley Roberts	Cook Islands	3:58.12	
36	2	8	Alex Sobers	Barbados	3:58.97	
37	2	0	Kushagra Rawat	India	3:59.39	
38	3	0	Aflah Prawira	Indonesia	3:59.98	
39	2	3	James Freeman	Botswana	4:00.48	
40	1	5	Daniel Jacobs	Aruba	4:00.69	
41	2	9	Irakli Revishvili	Georgia	4:00.88	
42	1	3	Christian Mayer	Peru	4:05.33	
43	1	6	Adib Khalil	Lebanon	4:06.70	
44	1	7	Franci Aleksi	Albania	4:07.39	
45	1	2	Filip Derkoski	North Macedonia	4:07.99	
46	1	1	Mawupemon Otogbe	Togo	4:25.30	
—	1	4	Omar Abbas	Syria	DSQ	

=== Final ===
The final was held at 20:02.

Rank	Lane	Name	Nationality	Time	Notes
1st place, gold medalist(s)	4	Sun Yang	China	3:42.44	
2nd place, silver medalist(s)	2	Mack Horton	Australia	3:43.17	
3rd place, bronze medalist(s)	6	Gabriele Detti	Italy	3:43.23	NR
4	5	Danas Rapšys	Lithuania	3:43.50	
5	1	Marco De Tullio	Italy	3:44.86	
6	3	Jack McLoughlin	Australia	3:45.19	
7	8	Ji Xinjie	China	3:45.64	
8	7	Zane Grothe	United States	3:45.78	
