= Kyrgyzstan at the 2013 World Aquatics Championships =

- Flag of Kyrgyzstan
- FINA code: KGZ
- National federation: Swimming Federation of the Republic of Kyrgyzstan

in Barcelona, Spain
- Competitors: 4 in 1 sports
- Medals: Gold 0 Silver 0 Bronze 0 Total 0

World Aquatics Championships appearances
- 1994; 1998; 2001; 2003; 2005; 2007; 2009; 2011; 2013; 2015; 2017; 2019; 2022; 2023; 2024

Other related appearances
- Soviet Union (1973–1991)

Kyrgyzstan is competing at the 2013 World Aquatics Championships in Barcelona, Spain between 19 July and 4 August 2013.

== Swimming ==
Kyrgyzstani swimmers achieved qualifying standards in the following events (up to a maximum of 2 swimmers in each event at the A-standard entry time, and 1 at the B-standard):

Men

Athlete	Event	Heat		Semifinal		Final	
Athlete	Event	Time	Rank	Time	Rank	Time	Rank
Vasilii Danilov	100 m breaststroke	1:06.51	62	did not advance			
Vasilii Danilov	200 m individual medley	2:07.66	45	did not advance			
Damir Davletbaev	200 m breaststroke	2:25.73	40	did not advance			
Damir Davletbaev	50 m butterfly	26.67	60	did not advance			
Kirill Vais	50 m freestyle	24.69	65	did not advance			
Kirill Vais	50 m breaststroke	29.15	50	did not advance			

Women

Athlete	Event	Heat		Semifinal		Final	
Athlete	Event	Time	Rank	Time	Rank	Time	Rank
Dariya Talanova	50 m breaststroke	32.83	42	did not advance			
Dariya Talanova	100 m breaststroke	1:11.45	41	did not advance			
