= Jordan at the 2022 World Aquatics Championships =

- Flag of Jordan
- FINA code: JOR
- National federation: Jordan Swimming Federation
- Website: www.jsf.com.jo/en_home.asp

in Budapest, Hungary
- Competitors: 2 in 1 sport
- Medals: Gold 0 Silver 0 Bronze 0 Total 0

World Aquatics Championships appearances
- 1973; 1975; 1978; 1982; 1986; 1991; 1994; 1998; 2001; 2003; 2005; 2007; 2009; 2011; 2013; 2015; 2017; 2019; 2022; 2023; 2024

Jordan competed at the 2022 World Aquatics Championships in Budapest, Hungary from 17 June to 3 July.

== Swimming ==
Jordan entered two swimmers.

Men

Athlete	Event	Heat		Semifinal		Final	
Athlete	Event	Time	Rank	Time	Rank	Time	Rank
Adnan Al-Abdallat	200 m freestyle	1:59.70	56	did not advance			
Adnan Al-Abdallat	200 m medley	2:14.31	41	did not advance			
Amro Al-Wir	100 m breaststroke	1:01.87	29	did not advance			
Amro Al-Wir	200 m breaststroke	2:11.99	17 Q	2:11.05	13	did not advance	
