= Anastasiia Filina =

Kyrgyzstani swimmer (born 2002)

Personal information
- Born: 18 March 2002 (age 24)

Sport
- Sport: Swimming

Anastasiia Filina (born 18 March 2002) is a Kyrgyzstani swimmer.

In 2019, she represented Kyrgyzstan at the 2019 World Aquatics Championships held in Gwangju, South Korea. She competed in the women's 50 metre freestyle and women's 100 metre freestyle events. In both events she did not advance to compete in the semi-finals.
