= Sweden at the 2022 World Aquatics Championships =

- Flag of Sweden
- World Aquatics code: SWE
- National federation: Swedish Swimming Federation

in Budapest, Hungary
- Competitors: 18 in 4 sports
- Medals Ranked 11th: Gold 2 Silver 2 Bronze 0 Total 4

World Aquatics Championships appearances (overview)
- 1973; 1975; 1978; 1982; 1986; 1991; 1994; 1998; 2001; 2003; 2005; 2007; 2009; 2011; 2013; 2015; 2017; 2019; 2022; 2023; 2024; 2025

Sweden competed at the 2022 World Aquatics Championships in Budapest, Hungary from 18 June to 3 July.

== Medalists ==
Medal	Name	Sport	Event	Date
Gold	Sarah Sjöström	Swimming	Women's 50 metre butterfly	24 June
Gold	Sarah Sjöström	Swimming	Women's 50 metre freestyle	25 June
Silver	Sarah Sjöström	Swimming	Women's 100 metre freestyle	23 June
Silver	Erik Persson	Swimming	Men's 200 metre breaststroke	23 June

== Artistic swimming ==
Sweden entered 2 artistic swimmers.

Women

Athlete	Event	Preliminaries		Final	
Athlete	Event	Points	Rank	Points	Rank
Clara Ternström	Solo technical routine	72.2373	20	did not advance	
Clara Ternström	Solo free routine	72.4333	21	did not advance	
Anna Högdal; Clara Ternström	Duet technical routine	71.0101	24	did not advance	
Anna Högdal; Clara Ternström	Duet free routine	73.0667	25	did not advance	

== Diving ==
Sweden entered 3 divers.

Men

Athlete	Event	Preliminaries		Semifinals		Final	
Athlete	Event	Points	Rank	Points	Rank	Points	Rank
David Ekdahl	1 m springboard	323.60	23	—N/a		did not advance	
David Ekdahl	3 m springboard	250.10	52	did not advance			

Women

Athlete	Event	Preliminaries		Semifinals		Final	
Athlete	Event	Points	Rank	Points	Rank	Points	Rank
Emma Gullstrand	1 m springboard	246.10	12 Q	—N/a		225.55	12
Emma Gullstrand	3 m springboard	267.30	16 Q	266.30	15	did not advance	
Emilia Nilsson	1 m springboard	262.95	2 Q	—N/a		241.05	11
Emilia Nilsson	3 m springboard	292.80	9 Q	283.55	9 Q	265.20	11

== Open water swimming ==
Sweden entered 1 open water male swimmers

Men

Athlete	Event	Time	Rank
Elliot Sodemann	25 km	did not finish	

== Swimming ==
Sweden entered 14 swimmers.

Men

Athlete	Event	Heat		Semifinal		Final	
Athlete	Event	Time	Rank	Time	Rank	Time	Rank
Robin Hanson	100 m freestyle	50.06	43	did not advance			
Robin Hanson	200 m freestyle	1:47.54	17	did not advance			
Oskar Hoff	50 m butterfly	23.73	30	did not advance			
Oskar Hoff	100 m butterfly	53.58	38	did not advance			
Isak Eliasson	50 m freestyle	22.47	27	did not advance			
Erik Persson	100 m breaststroke	1:00.34	12 Q	1:00.38	15	did not advance	
Erik Persson	200 m breaststroke	2:09.58	4 Q	2:08.84	4 Q	2:08.38	2nd place, silver medalist(s)
Björn Seeliger; Isak Eliasson; Robin Hanson; Elias Persson	4 × 100 m freestyle relay	3:15.46	11	—N/a		did not advance	

Women

Athlete	Event	Heat		Semifinal		Final	
Athlete	Event	Time	Rank	Time	Rank	Time	Rank
Sofia Åstedt	200 m freestyle	2:03.22	27	did not advance			
Emelie Fast	50 m breaststroke	31.94	29	did not advance			
Emelie Fast	100 m breaststroke	1:09.81	31	did not advance			
Louise Hansson	50 m backstroke	28.67	21	did not advance			
Louise Hansson	100 m butterfly	57.53	5 Q	56.97	5 Q	56.48	4
Sophie Hansson	50 m breaststroke	30.64	7 Q	30.56	10	did not advance	
Sophie Hansson	100 m breaststroke	1:06.61	6 Q	1:06.30	6 Q	1:06.39	6
Sophie Hansson	200 m breaststroke	2:25.74	8 Q	2:25.12	9	did not advance	
Sara Junevik	50 m butterfly	25.94	6 Q	25.80	9	did not advance	
Hanna Rosvall	100 m backstroke	1:00.99	14 Q	1:00.76	14	did not advance	
Sarah Sjöström	50 m freestyle	24.40	1 Q	24.15	2 Q	23.98	1st place, gold medalist(s)
Sarah Sjöström	100 m freestyle	53.78	4 Q	53.02	2 Q	52.80	2nd place, silver medalist(s)
Sarah Sjöström	50 m butterfly	25.43	2 Q	25.13	1 Q	24.95	1st place, gold medalist(s)
Hanna Rosvall; Sophie Hansson; Louise Hansson; Sarah Sjöström	4 × 100 m medley relay	3:57.81	3 Q	—N/a		3:55.96	4

Mixed

Athlete	Event	Heat		Final	
Athlete	Event	Time	Rank	Time	Rank
Robin Hanson; Isak Eliasson; Sofia Åstedt; Sara Junevik	4 × 100 m freestyle relay	3:29.03	10	did not advance	
