= Artistic swimming at the 2024 World Aquatics Championships – Women's solo free routine =

Women's solo free routine at the 2024 World Aquatics Championships
- Venue: Aspire Dome
- Location: Doha, Qatar
- Dates: 4 February (preliminary); 6 February (final)
- Competitors: 31 from 31 nations
- Winning points: 264.8207

Medalists
gold medal	Jacqueline Simoneau	Canada
silver medal	Evangelia Platanioti	Greece
bronze medal	Vasilina Khandoshka	Authorised Neutral Athletes

The Women's solo free routine competition at the 2024 World Aquatics Championships was held on 4 and 6 February 2024.

== Results ==
The preliminary round was started on 4 February at 09:30. The final was started on 6 February at 20:00.

Green denotes finalists

Rank	Swimmer	Nationality	Preliminary		Final	
Rank	Swimmer	Nationality	Points	Rank	Points	Rank
1st place, gold medalist(s)	Jacqueline Simoneau	Canada	248.9189	3	264.8207	1
2nd place, silver medalist(s)	Evangelia Platanioti	Greece	253.7353	2	253.2833	2
3rd place, bronze medalist(s)	Vasilina Khandoshka	Neutral Independent Athletes	224.1771	5	245.1042	3
4	Xu Huiyan	China	230.8104	4	244.2251	4
5	Klara Bleyer	Germany	206.9958	10	230.8894	5
6	Vasiliki Alexandri	Austria	253.8625	1	222.8938	6
7	Jasmine Verbena	San Marino	207.0645	9	207.5209	7
8	Marloes Steenbeek	Netherlands	200.9729	11	207.0979	8
9	Karina Magrupova	Kazakhstan	200.6688	12	200.8166	9
10	Susanna Pedotti	Italy	212.4521	7	195.5000	10
11	Viktória Reichová	Slovakia	207.7917	8	195.2249	11
12	Mari Alavidze	Georgia	219.2188	6	185.7250	12
13	Kyra Hoevertsz	Aruba	197.7791	13	Did not advance	
14	Mónica Arango	Colombia	192.1437	14	Did not advance	
15	Jullia Catharino	Brazil	191.0187	15	Did not advance	
16	Ece Üngör	Turkey	188.4854	16	Did not advance	
17	Sandra Freund	Sweden	178.8063	17	Did not advance	
18	Matea Butorac	Croatia	170.9208	18	Did not advance	
19	Ana Culic	Malta	167.4229	19	Did not advance	
20	Jennifer Russanov	New Zealand	163.4624	20	Did not advance	
21	Jennah Hafsi	Morocco	162.7730	21	Did not advance	
22	Patrawee Chayawararak	Thailand	153.9583	22	Did not advance	
23	Cesia Castaneda	El Salvador	136.6501	23	Did not advance	
24	Sini Tuuli	Finland	127.6854	24	Did not advance	
25	Gabriela Alpajón	Cuba	126.7458	25	Did not advance	
26	Hilda Tri Julyandra	Indonesia	122.1063	26	Did not advance	
27	Shao Anlan	Macau	119.2521	27	Did not advance	
28	Anna Mitinian	Costa Rica	115.0938	28	Did not advance	
29	Toulan Ben Abdel Fattah	Tunisia	101.1083	29	Did not advance	
30	Alexandra Mansaré-Traoré	Guinea	95.7020	30	Did not advance	
31	Yasmina Rushaidat	Jordan	77.2979	31	Did not advance	
