= Sweden at the 2024 World Aquatics Championships =

- Flag of Sweden
- FINA code: SWE
- National federation: Swedish Swimming Federation
- Website: svensksimidrott.se (in Swedish)

in Doha, Qatar
- Competitors: 18 in 3 sports
- Medals Ranked 9th: Gold 2 Silver 1 Bronze 1 Total 4

World Aquatics Championships appearances (overview)
- 1973; 1975; 1978; 1982; 1986; 1991; 1994; 1998; 2001; 2003; 2005; 2007; 2009; 2011; 2013; 2015; 2017; 2019; 2022; 2023; 2024

Sweden competed at the 2024 World Aquatics Championships in Doha, Qatar from 2 to 18 February.

== Medalists ==
Medal	Name	Sport	Event	Date
1st place, gold medalist(s)	Sarah Sjöström	Swimming	Women's 50 metre butterfly	17 February 2024
1st place, gold medalist(s)	Sarah Sjöström	Swimming	Women's 50 metre freestyle	18 February 2024
2nd place, silver medalist(s)	Louise Hansson; Sophie Hansson; Sarah Sjöström; Michelle Coleman; Hanna Rosvall	Swimming	Women's 4 × 100 metre medley relay	18 February 2024
3rd place, bronze medalist(s)	Louise Hansson	Swimming	Women's 100 metre butterfly	12 February 2024

== Competitors ==
The following is the list of competitors in the Championships.

Sport	Men	Women	Total
Artistic swimming	1	1	2
Diving	2	3	8
Swimming	6	5	11
Total	9	9	18

== Artistic swimming ==
Men

Athlete	Event	Preliminaries		Final	
Athlete	Event	Points	Rank	Points	Rank
David Martinez	Solo technical routine	181.1451	9 Q	187.2700	10

Women

Athlete	Event	Preliminaries		Final	
Athlete	Event	Points	Rank	Points	Rank
Sandra Freund	Slo technical routine	207.4601	17	Did not advance	
Sandra Freund	Solo free routine	178.8063	17	Did not advance	

Mixed

Athlete	Event	Preliminaries		Final	
Athlete	Event	Points	Rank	Points	Rank
Sandra Freund; David Martinez	Duet technical routine	199.0434	8 Q	199.9283	7

== Diving ==
Men

Athlete	Event	Preliminaries		Semifinals		Final	
Athlete	Event	Points	Rank	Points	Rank	Points	Rank
David Ekdahl	1 m springboard	293.10	20	—		Did not advance	
David Ekdahl	3 m springboard	263.90	58	Did not advance			
Elias Petersen	1 m springboard	265.30	28	—		Did not advance	
Elias Petersen	3 m springboard	322.65	41	Did not advance			

Women

Athlete	Event	Preliminaries		Semifinals		Final	
Athlete	Event	Points	Rank	Points	Rank	Points	Rank
Emilia Nilsson Garip	1 m springboard	242.15	4 Q	—		247.45	10
Elna Widerström	1 m springboard	233.35	9 Q	—		235.50	12
Elna Widerström	3 m springboard	224.55	32	Did not advance			
Emma Gullstrand; Elna Widerström	3 m synchro springboard	—				233.46	12

Mixed

Athlete	Event	Final	
Athlete	Event	Points	Rank
Elias Petersen; Emilia Nilsson Garip	3 m synchro springboard	267.39	6

== Swimming ==
Sweden entered 11 swimmers.

Men

Athlete	Event	Heat		Semifinal		Final	
Athlete	Event	Time	Rank	Time	Rank	Time	Rank
Robin Hanson	200 metre freestyle	1:47.56	22	Did not advance			
Victor Johansson	400 metre freestyle	3:46.20 NR	8 Q	—		3:45.87 NR	6
Victor Johansson	800 metre freestyle	7:47.04 NR	4 Q	—		7:47.08	6
Victor Johansson	1500 metre freestyle	14:58.73	11	—		Did not advance	
Erik Persson	200 metre breaststroke	2:10.94	5 Q	2:10.04	7 Q	2:10.21	8
Björn Seeliger	50 metre freestyle	21.99	13 Q	21.67	4 Q	21.83	7
Björn Seeliger	100 metre freestyle	48.84	14 Q	48.84	16	Did not advance	
Björn Seeliger	50 metre backstroke	25.10	12 Q	25.10	14	Did not advance	
Robin Hanson; Björn Seeliger; Isak Eliasson; Marcus Holmquist	4 × 100 m freestyle relay	3:15.37	9	—		Did not advance	

Women

Athlete	Event	Heat		Semifinal		Final	
Athlete	Event	Time	Rank	Time	Rank	Time	Rank
Michelle Coleman	50 metre freestyle	24.75	6 Q	24.65	6 Q	24.79	8
Michelle Coleman	100 metre freestyle	54.72	11 Q	54.25	9	Did not advance	
Louise Hansson	50 metre backstroke	28.38	13 Q	28.13	7 Q	28.32	8
Louise Hansson	50 metre butterfly	25.98	8 Q	26.01	10	Did not advance	
Louise Hansson	100 metre butterfly	57.45	2 Q	57.28	4 Q	56.94	3rd place, bronze medalist(s)
Sophie Hansson	50 metre breaststroke	30.83	8 Q	30.71	9	Did not advance	
Sophie Hansson	100 metre breaststroke	1:07.19	9 Q	1:06.78	10	Did not advance	
Sophie Hansson	200 metre breaststroke	Did not start		Did not advance			
Hanna Rosvall	100 metre backstroke	1:01.20	11 Q	1:01.67	15	Did not advance	
Sarah Sjöström	50 metre freestyle	23.91	1 Q	23.90	1 Q	23.69	1st place, gold medalist(s)
Sarah Sjöström	100 metre freestyle	Did not start		Did not advance			
Sarah Sjöström	50 metre butterfly	24.88	1 Q	25.08	1 Q	24.63	1st place, gold medalist(s)
Louise Hansson; Sophie Hansson; Sarah Sjöström; Michelle Coleman; Hanna Rosvall	4 × 100 m medley relay	3:59.35	2 Q	—		3:56.35	2nd place, silver medalist(s)

Mixed

Athlete	Event	Heat		Semifinal		Final	
Athlete	Event	Time	Rank	Time	Rank	Time	Rank
Hanna Rosvall; Erik Persson; Louise Hansson; Björn Seeliger; Robin Hanson	4 × 100 m medley relay	3:47.50	7 Q	—		3:47.46	7
