= Finland at the 2011 World Aquatics Championships =

- Flag of Finland
- FINA code: FIN
- National federation: Suomen Uimaliitto
- Website: www.uimaliitto.fi

in Shanghai, China
- Medals: Gold 0 Silver 0 Bronze 0 Total 0

World Aquatics Championships appearances
- 1973; 1975; 1978; 1982; 1986; 1991; 1994; 1998; 2001; 2003; 2005; 2007; 2009; 2011; 2013; 2015; 2017; 2019; 2022; 2023; 2024

Finland competed at the 2011 World Aquatics Championships in Shanghai, China between July 16 and 31, 2011.

== Diving ==
Finland qualified 1 athlete in diving.

Men

| Athlete | Event | Preliminary | | Semifinals | | Final | |
| Athlete | Event | Points | Rank | Points | Rank | Points | Rank |
|---|---|---|---|---|---|---|---|
| Ville Vahtola | Men's 1m Springboard | 321.95 | 24 | | | did not advance | |
| Ville Vahtola | Men's 3m Springboard | 364.80 | 33 | did not advance | | | |

== Swimming ==
Finland qualified 6 swimmers.

Men

| Athlete | Event | Heats | | Semifinals | | Final | |
| Athlete | Event | Time | Rank | Time | Rank | Time | Rank |
|---|---|---|---|---|---|---|---|
| Ari-Pekka Liukkonen | Men's 50m Freestyle | 22.67 | 27 | did not advance | | | |
| Iisakki Ratilainen | Men's 50m Breaststroke | 28.58 | 32 | did not advance | | | |

Women

| Athlete | Event | Heats | | Semifinals | | Final | |
| Athlete | Event | Time | Rank | Time | Rank | Time | Rank |
|---|---|---|---|---|---|---|---|
| Hanna-Maria Seppala | Women's 50m Freestyle | 25.79 | 23 | did not advance | | | |
| Hanna-Maria Seppala | Women's 100m Freestyle | 55.06 | 20 | did not advance | | | |
| Hanna-Maria Seppala | Women's 100m Backstroke | 1:03.18 | 35 | did not advance | | | |
| Anni Alitalo | Women's 50m Backstroke | 29.39 | 31 | did not advance | | | |
| Jenna Laukkanen | Women's 100m Breaststroke | 1:09.39 | 22 | did not advance | | | |
| Jenna Laukkanen | Women's 200m Breaststroke | 2:30.51 | 24 | did not advance | | | |
| Emilia Pikkarainen | Women's 200m Butterfly | 2:12.44 | 26 | did not advance | | | |
| Emilia Pikkarainen | Women's 200m IM | 2:19.94 | 29 | did not advance | | | |
| Anni Alitalo; Jenna Laukkanen; Emilia Pikkarainen; Hanna-Maria Seppala | Women's 4 × 100 m Medley Relay | 4:08.47 | 16 | | | did not advance | |
