= Swimming at the 2024 World Aquatics Championships – Women's 50 metre breaststroke =

Women's 50 metre breaststroke at the Swimming at the 2024 World Aquatics Championships
- Venue: Aspire Dome
- Location: Doha, Qatar
- Dates: 17 February (heats and semifinal); 18 February (final)
- Competitors: 42 from 39 nations
- Winning time: 29.40

Medalists
gold medal	Rūta Meilutytė	Lithuania
silver medal	Tang Qianting	China
bronze medal	Benedetta Pilato	Italy

The Women's 50 metre breaststroke competition at the 2024 World Aquatics Championships was held on 17 and 18 February 2024.

== Qualification ==
Each National Federation was permitted to enter a maximum of two qualified athletes in each individual event, but only if both of them had attained the "A" standard qualification time at approved qualifying events. For this event, the "A" standard qualification time was 31.02 seconds. Federations could enter one athlete into the event if they met the "B" standard qualification time. For this event, the "B" standard qualification time was 32.11. Athletes could also enter the event if they had met an "A" or "B" standard in a different event and their Federation had not entered anyone else. Additional considerations applied to Federations who had few swimmers enter through the standard qualification times. Federations in this category could at least enter two men and two women into the competition, all of whom could enter into up to two events.

== Records ==
Prior to the competition, the existing world and championship records were as follows.

World record	Rūta Meilutytė (LTU)	29.16	Fukuoka, Japan	30 July 2023
Competition record	Rūta Meilutytė (LTU)	29.16	Fukuoka, Japan	30 July 2023

== Results ==
=== Heats ===
The heats were started on 17 February at 10:08.

Rank	Heat	Lane	Name	Nationality	Time	Notes
1	4	4	Benedetta Pilato	Italy	29.89	Q
2	3	5	Tang Qianting	China	29.93	Q
3	5	4	Rūta Meilutytė	Lithuania	30.05	Q
4	3	4	Lara van Niekerk	South Africa	30.28	Q
5	5	7	Ida Hulkko	Finland	30.36	Q
6	5	3	Veera Kivirinta	Finland	30.53	Q
7	4	5	Mona McSharry	Ireland	30.72	Q
8	4	3	Sophie Hansson	Sweden	30.83	Q
9	4	7	Silje Slyngstadli	Norway	30.86	Q, NR
9	4	1	Sophie Angus	Canada	30.86	Q
11	5	6	Dominika Sztandera	Poland	30.91	Q
12	5	5	Anita Bottazzo	Italy	30.94	Q
13	3	7	Yang Chang	China	31.02	Q
14	4	6	Fleur Vermeiren	Belgium	31.08	Q
15	5	2	Piper Enge	United States	31.09	Q
16	3	6	Ana Rodrigues	Portugal	31.25	Q
17	3	8	Thanya Dela Cruz	Philippines	31.27	
18	5	1	Macarena Ceballos	Argentina	31.32	
19	4	8	Jenjira Srisaard	Thailand	31.35	
20	3	2	Maria-Thaleia Drasidou	Greece	31.49	
21	2	3	Chen Pui Lam	Macau	31.56	NR
22	4	9	Tara Vovk	Slovenia	31.65	
23	5	9	Stefanía Gómez	Colombia	31.75	
24	3	1	Ana Carolina Vieira	Brazil	31.81	
25	5	0	Jimena Ruiz	Spain	31.99	
26	2	6	Lanihei Connolly	Cook Islands	32.03	
27	5	8	Lin Pei-wun	Chinese Taipei	32.10	
28	3	9	Melissa Rodríguez	Mexico	32.15	
29	2	5	Lam Hoi Kiu	Hong Kong	32.57	
30	2	4	Phee Jinq En	Malaysia	32.70	
31	2	7	Ellie Shaw	Antigua and Barbuda	32.73	NR
32	3	0	Lisa Mamié	Switzerland	32.88	
33	1	6	Alicia Kok Shun	Mauritius	33.19	
34	2	0	Kirabo Namutebi	Uganda	33.71	
35	2	2	Victoria Russell	Bahamas	34.03	
36	2	1	Naiara Roca	Bolivia	35.20	
37	2	8	N'Hara Fernandes	Angola	36.34	
38	2	9	Taeyanna Adams	Federated States of Micronesia	37.87	
39	1	4	Mariama Touré	Guinea	40.83	
40	1	5	Nina Amison	Djibouti	45.87	
41	1	3	Olamide Sam	Sierra Leone	1:04.78	
	4	0	Adelaida Pchelintseva	Kazakhstan	Disqualified	
	1	2	Rita Acaba Ocomo	Equatorial Guinea	Did not start	
	3	3	Kotryna Teterevkova	Lithuania	Did not start	
	4	2	Charlotte Bonnet	France	Did not start	

=== Semifinals ===
The semifinals were held on 17 February at 19:25.

Rank	Heat	Lane	Name	Nationality	Time	Notes
1	2	5	Rūta Meilutytė	Lithuania	29.42	Q
2	1	4	Tang Qianting	China	29.80	Q, AS
3	2	4	Benedetta Pilato	Italy	29.91	Q
4	2	8	Piper Enge	United States	30.53	Q
5	1	5	Lara van Niekerk	South Africa	30.56	Q
6	1	3	Veera Kivirinta	Finland	30.57	Q
6	2	6	Mona McSharry	Ireland	30.57	Q
8	2	3	Ida Hulkko	Finland	30.69	Q
9	1	6	Sophie Hansson	Sweden	30.71	
10	2	7	Dominika Sztandera	Poland	30.78	
11	2	1	Yang Chang	China	30.86	
12	2	2	Sophie Angus	Canada	30.87	
13	1	7	Anita Bottazzo	Italy	30.89	
14	1	8	Ana Rodrigues	Portugal	31.09	
15	1	2	Silje Slyngstadli	Norway	31.34	
16	1	1	Fleur Vermeiren	Belgium	31.60	

=== Final ===
The final was held on 18 February at 19:09.

Rank	Lane	Name	Nationality	Time	Notes
1st place, gold medalist(s)	4	Rūta Meilutytė	Lithuania	29.40	
2nd place, silver medalist(s)	5	Tang Qianting	China	29.51	AS
3rd place, bronze medalist(s)	3	Benedetta Pilato	Italy	30.01	
4	2	Lara van Niekerk	South Africa	30.47	
5	7	Ida Hulkko	Finland	30.60	
6	6	Piper Enge	United States	30.69	
7	8	Veera Kivirinta	Finland	30.73	
8	1	Mona McSharry	Ireland	30.96	

== Sources ==
- "Competition Regulations" (PDF). World Aquatics. Archived (PDF) from the original on 15 February 2026.
