= Nawapas Pisanuwong =

Thai swimmer

Personal information
- Born: 1 January 2001 (age 25)

Sport
- Sport: Swimming

Nawapas Pisanuwong (born 1 January 2001) is a Thai swimmer. She competed in the women's 100 metre breaststroke event at the 2017 World Aquatics Championships.
