= Roosa Kanerva =

Finnish diver

Personal information
- Born: 17 March 1999 (age 26)

Sport
- Country: Finland
- Sport: Diving

Roosa Kanerva (born 17 March 1999) is a Finnish diver. In 2019, she finished in 34th place in the preliminary round in the women's 1 metre springboard event at the 2019 World Aquatics Championships held in Gwangju, South Korea.

In 2015, she competed in the women's 1 metre springboard event at the 2015 European Games held in Baku, Azerbaijan.

In 2019, she also finished in 23rd place in the preliminary round in the women's 1 metre springboard at the 2019 European Diving Championships held in Kyiv, Ukraine.
