= Ryuya Mura =

Japanese swimmer (born 1996)

Personal information
- Born: 3 July 1996 (age 30) Yonago, Japan
- Height: 1.73 m (5 ft 8 in)

Sport
- Country: Japan
- Sport: Swimming
Medal record
Men's swimming
Representing Japan
Junior Pan Pacific Championships
| Gold medal – first place | 2014 Maui | 200 m breaststroke |
| Silver medal – second place | 2014 Maui | 100 m breaststroke |
| Silver medal – second place | 2014 Maui | 4×100 m medley |

Ryuya Mura (武良竜也, Mura Ryūya, born 3 July 1996) is a Japanese breaststroke swimmer. He competed in the 2020 Summer Olympics. ,
