= Talita Baqlah =

Jordanian swimmer

Personal information
- Native name: تاليتا بقلة
- Nationality: Jordanian
- Born: 27 October 1995 (age 30) Pecica, Romania

Sport
- Sport: Swimming
- Strokes: Freestyle

Talita Baqlah (Arabic: تاليتا بقلة; born 27 October 1995) is a Jordanian swimmer who has competed in three consecutive Olympic games, in the 2012, 2016 and 2020 Summer Olympics.

== Career ==
Baqlah was born in Pecica, Romania. She competed in 50 metre freestyle at the 2012 Summer Olympics in London where she ranked 45th. She also competed in the Women's 50 metre freestyle contest at the 2016 Summer Olympics in Rio de Janeiro, and she ranked 51st. She set a Jordanian national record with a time of 26.48.

She represented Jordan at the 2015 World Aquatics Championships, and 2019 World Aquatics Championships held in Gwangju, South Korea. She competed in the women's 50 metre freestyle and women's 100 metre freestyle events. In both events she did not advance to compete in the semi-finals. She also competed in two mixed relay events, without winning a medal.

Her brother is Khader Baqlah.

== National records ==
Baqlah has set a number of Jordanian national records, including in 50 Freestyle, 100 Freestyle, 50 Backstroke, 50 Butterfly, 100 Butterfly.
