= Riku Pöytäkivi =

Finnish swimmer

Personal information
- Born: 1 May 1993 (age 33)

Sport
- Sport: Swimming

Riku Pöytäkivi (born 1 May 1993) is a Finnish swimmer. He competed in the men's 50 metre butterfly event at the 2017 World Aquatics Championships. Pöytäkivi was a former esports player under the name Keittiömestari in Tom Clancy's Rainbow Six Siege playing on GiFu esports. In 2019, he competed in two events at the 2019 World Aquatics Championships held in Gwangju, South Korea.
