= Lauren Hallaselkä =

Finnish diver (born 2003)

Personal information
- Nationality: Finnish/British
- Born: 18 March 2003 (age 22)

Sport
- Sport: Diving

Lauren Hallaselkä (born 18 March 2003) is a Finnish diver. She competed in the women's 1-metre springboard event at the 2019 World Aquatics Championships. She finished in 30th place in the preliminary round.
