= Mohammed Bedour =

Jordanian swimmer

Personal information
- Born: September 23, 2000 (age 26)

Sport
- Sport: Swimming
- Strokes: Backstroke, freestyle

Mohammed Omar Bedour (born 2000), is a Jordanian swimmer. He competed at the 2015 World Aquatics Championships in the Men's 100 metre freestyle, Men's 100 metre backstroke, 4 × 100 metre mixed freestyle relay and 4 × 100 metre mixed medley relay. re,
