= Khader Baqlah =

Jordanian swimmer

Personal information
- Native name: خضر غترخ بقلة
- Full name: Khader Ghetrich Baqlah
- Nationality: Jordanian
- Born: 15 September 1998 (age 27) Amman, Jordan

Sport
- Sport: Swimming

Khader Ghetrich Baqlah (Arabic: خضر غترخ بقلة, born 15 September 1998) is a Jordanian swimmer. He competed in the men's 200 metre freestyle event at the 2016 Summer Olympics. In 2014, he represented Jordan at the 2014 Summer Youth Olympics held in Nanjing, China.

He swam for the University of Florida. He was an eleven-time All American.
