= Jordan at the 2011 World Aquatics Championships =

Sporting event delegation

Flag of Jordan

Jordan competed at the 2011 World Aquatics Championships in Shanghai, China between July 16 and 31, 2011.

== Swimming ==
Jordan qualified 3 swimmers.

Men

Athlete	Event	Heats		Semifinals		Final	
Athlete	Event	Time	Rank	Time	Rank	Time	Rank
Kareem Ennab	Men's 50m Freestyle	24.35	52	did not advance			
Kareem Ennab	Men's 100m Freestyle	53.92	69	did not advance			
Awse Ma'aya	Men's 100m Backstroke	1:00.64	48	did not advance			
Awse Ma'aya	Men's 200m Backstroke	2:12.22	30	did not advance			

Women

Athlete	Event	Heats		Semifinals		Final	
Athlete	Event	Time	Rank	Time	Rank	Time	Rank
Talita Baqlah	Women's 50m Freestyle	27.71	46	did not advance			
Talita Baqlah	Women's 50m Butterfly	29.16	35	did not advance			
