= Kyrgyzstan at the 2011 World Aquatics Championships =

Sporting event delegation

Flag of Kyrgyzstan

Kyrgyzstan competed at the 2011 World Aquatics Championships in Shanghai, China between July 16 and 31, 2011.

== Swimming ==
Kyrgyzstan qualified 3 swimmers.

Men

Athlete	Event	Heats		Semifinals		Final	
Athlete	Event	Time	Rank	Time	Rank	Time	Rank
Dmitrii Aleksandrov	Men's 200m Breaststroke	2:21.51	43	did not advance			
Vasilii Danilov	Men's 200m IM	2:08.68	38	did not advance			

Women

Athlete	Event	Heats		Semifinals		Final	
Athlete	Event	Time	Rank	Time	Rank	Time	Rank
Daria Talanova	Women's 200m Breaststroke	2:38.07	30	did not advance			
