= Denis Petrashov =

Kyrgyzstani swimmer (born 2000)

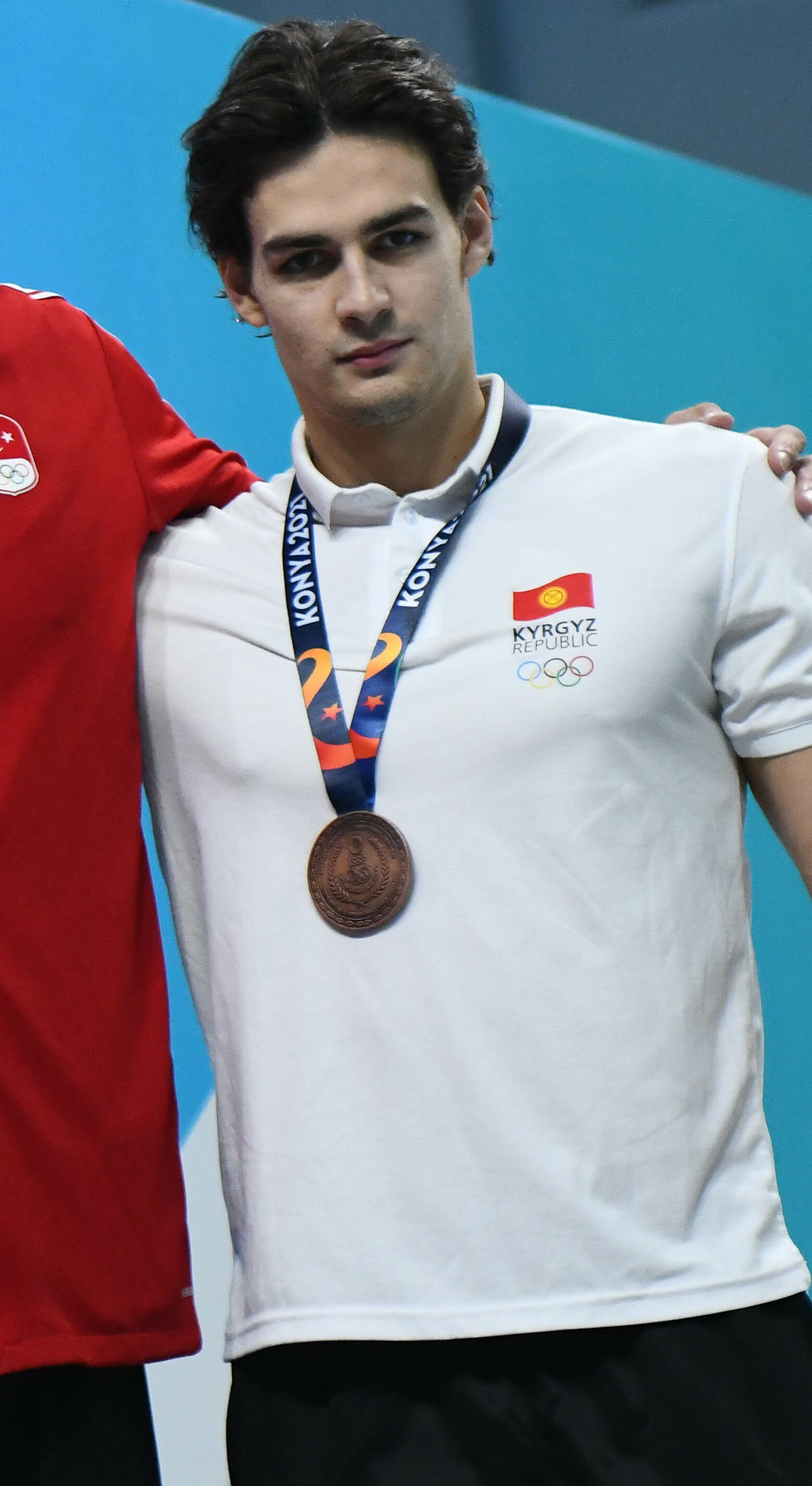

Personal information
- Native name: Денис Евгеньевич Петрашов
- Full name: Denis Evgenyevich Petrashov
- National team: Kyrgyzstan
- Born: 1 February 2000 (age 26) Bishkek, Kyrgyzstan
- Height: 1.92 m (6 ft 4 in)
- Weight: 82 kg (181 lb)

Sport
- Sport: Swimming
- Strokes: Breaststroke
- College team: Louisville Cardinals
Medal record
Men's swimming
Representing Kyrgyzstan
World Championships (LC)
Bronze medal – third place	2025 Singapore	100 m breaststroke
Asian Games
Silver medal – second place	2026 Aichi-Nagoya	200 m breaststroke
World University Games
Gold medal – first place	2025 Rhine-Ruhr	100 m breaststroke
Youth Olympics
Silver medal – second place	2018 Buenos Aires	100 m breaststroke
Islamic Solidarity Games
Gold medal – first place	2021 Konya	100 m breaststroke
Bronze medal – third place	2021 Konya	50 m breaststroke
Bronze medal – third place	2021 Konya	200 m breaststroke
Maccabiah Games
Gold medal – first place	2022 Israel	100 m breaststroke
Gold medal – first place	2022 Israel	200 m breaststroke

Denis Petrashov (born February 1, 2000) is a Kyrgyz competitive swimmer who swam for the University of Louisville and was a three-time Olympic participant. He competed in the Men's 200-meter breaststroke event at the 2016 Summer Olympics and both the Men's 100-meter (swimming a 1:00.23, setting a Kyrgyz national record) and 200-meter breaststroke events at the 2021 Summer Olympics in Tokyo. He made the semifinals at the 2024 Paris Olympics in the 200-meter breaststroke, finishing seventh. Petrashov won the silver medal in the 100-meter breaststroke at the 2018 Youth Olympics, and gold medals at the 2022 Maccabiah Games in Israel in both the 100 m and 200 m breaststroke events.

== Early life ==
Petrashov's hometown is Bishkek, Kyrgyzstan. His father is former three-time Olympian and former breaststroke national record holder Yevgeny Petrashov.

== Three-time Olympian, 2016-2024 ==
Representing Kyrgyzstan, he competed in the Men's 200-meter breaststroke event at the 2016 Summer Olympics in Rio where he finished 38th with a time of 2:16.57.

At the 2021 Summer Olympics in Tokyo, he competed in both the Men's 100-meter breaststroke, where he swam a 1:00.23, finishing 27th overall, and setting a Kyrgyzstani national record, and in the 200-meter breaststroke where he finished 18th overall with a time of 2:10.07. As noted previously, his 200-meter time was a Kyrgyzstani national swimming record, which broke his previous record of 1:00.94 which he set at the 2019 World Aquatics Championships.

Petrashov also made the 2024 Olympic team for Kyrgyzstan where he finished seventh in the 200-Meter breaststroke in his semifinal heat, recording a time of 2:10.19.

== International swimming highlights ==
Petrashov won the gold medal in the 200-meter breaststroke at the 10th Asian Age Group Swimming Championships 2019 in Bangalore, India. He won two silver medals. in men's 50 and 100 meters breaststroke.

Petrashov was a 2-time Asian Games finalist, and a Youth Olympics silver medalist.

Petrashov won gold medals at the 2022 Maccabiah Games in Israel in the 100 m (in a time of 1:00.46, bettering the record set in the prior Maccabiah Games by American B.J. Johnson) and 200 m breaststroke events.

== University of Louisville ==
Petrashov attended the University of Louisville and competed for the Louisville Cardinals from around 2020-2024 under Head Coach Arthur Albiero. While swimming for Louisville in his first year of competition, Petrashov recorded times of 51.92 and 1:51.89 in the 100 and 200-yard breaststroke events. At the 2022 Atlantic Coast Conference (ACC) Championships, he was runner-up in the 200 breaststroke and seventh in the 100 breaststroke. He did not score at the 2022 NCAAs, after losing a swim-off for 16th in the 100 breaststroke, and not matching his ACC 200 breast time. In the 2022-23 season for Louisville, at the NCAA Championships, he placed third in the 100 breast, earning All-American honors with a time of 50.78 to set a new school record.

== Major results ==
Year	Competition	Venue	Position	Event	Notes
Representing Kyrgyzstan
2015	World Championships	Kazan, Russia	50th (h)	200 m breaststroke	2:22.84
2016	Olympic Games	Rio de Janeiro, Brazil	38th (h)	200 m breaststroke	2:16.57
2016	Asian Championships	Tokyo, Japan	19th (h)	50 m breaststroke	30.08
2016	Asian Championships	Tokyo, Japan	17th (h)	100 m breaststroke	1:04.28
2016	Asian Championships	Tokyo, Japan	6th	200 m breaststroke	2:17.45
2017	2017 Maccabiah Games	Jerusalem, Israel	5th	100 m breaststroke	1:03.37
2017	2017 Maccabiah Games	Jerusalem, Israel	5th	200 m breaststroke	2:18.84
2017	World Championships	Budapest, Hungary	48th (h)	100 m breaststroke	1:03.14
2017	World Championships	Budapest, Hungary	32nd (h)	200 m breaststroke	2:18.43
2018	Asian Games	Jakarta, Indonesia	16th (h)	50 m breaststroke	28.73
2018	Asian Games	Jakarta, Indonesia	11th (h)	100 m breaststroke	1:02.12
2018	Asian Games	Jakarta, Indonesia	5th	200 m breaststroke	2:12.19
2018	Youth Olympic Games	Buenos Aires, Argentina	7th	50 m breaststroke	28.70
2018	Youth Olympic Games	Buenos Aires, Argentina	2nd	100 m breaststroke	1:01.34
2018	Youth Olympic Games	Buenos Aires, Argentina	9th (h)	200 m breaststroke	2:16.70
2019	World Championships	Gwangju, South Korea	28th (h)	100 m breaststroke	1:00.94
2019	World Championships	Gwangju, South Korea	24th (h)	200 m breaststroke	2:11.65
2021	Olympic Games	Tokyo, Japan	27th (h)	100 m breaststroke	1:00.23
2021	Olympic Games	Tokyo, Japan	28th (h)	200 m breaststroke	2:10.07
2022	World Championships	Budapest, Hungary	20th (h)	50 m breaststroke	27.89
2022	World Championships	Budapest, Hungary	20th (h)	100 m breaststroke	1:00.86
2022	World Championships	Budapest, Hungary	12th (sf)	200 m breaststroke	2:11.00

== See also ==
- List of flag bearers for Kyrgyzstan at the Olympics
- List of Kyrgyzstani records in swimming
- "The Top Ranked Swimmers of All-Time from Kyrgyzstan"
