= Matti Mattsson =

Finnish swimmer

Personal information
- Born: 5 October 1993 (age 32) Pori, Finland
- Height: 1.97 m (6 ft 6 in)

Sport
- Sport: Swimming
Medal record
Men's swimming
Representing Finland
Olympic Games
Bronze medal – third place	2020 Tokyo	200 m breaststroke
World Championships (LC)
Bronze medal – third place	2013 Barcelona	200 m breaststroke
European Championships (LC)
Silver medal – second place	2022 Rome	200 m breaststroke

Matti Mattsson (born 5 October 1993 in Pori, Finland) is a Finnish swimmer and Olympic bronze medalist. In Barcelona at the 2013 Swimming World Championships, he won the bronze medal in the men's 200 metre breaststroke. He won a bronze medal at the 2020 Summer Olympics in the men's 200 metre breaststroke.

In January 2022, Mattsson was named the 2021 Sports Personality of the Year.

== Career ==
At the 2012 Summer Olympics, he competed in the men's 200 metre breaststroke, finishing in 17th place overall in the heats and failing to qualify for the semifinals.

At the 2016 Summer Olympics, he competed in the men's 200 metre breaststroke, placing 11th in the heats and qualifying for the semifinals, where he placed last.

At the 2020 Summer Olympics in Tokyo in 2021, he again competed in the men's 200 metre breaststroke, where he was the 5th fastest in the heats with a time of 2:08.22, a new Finnish record. In the finals, he set a time of 2:07.13, improving his own record by over a second and coming in third to win a bronze medal.
