= Amro Al-Wir =

Jordanian swimmer (born 2001)

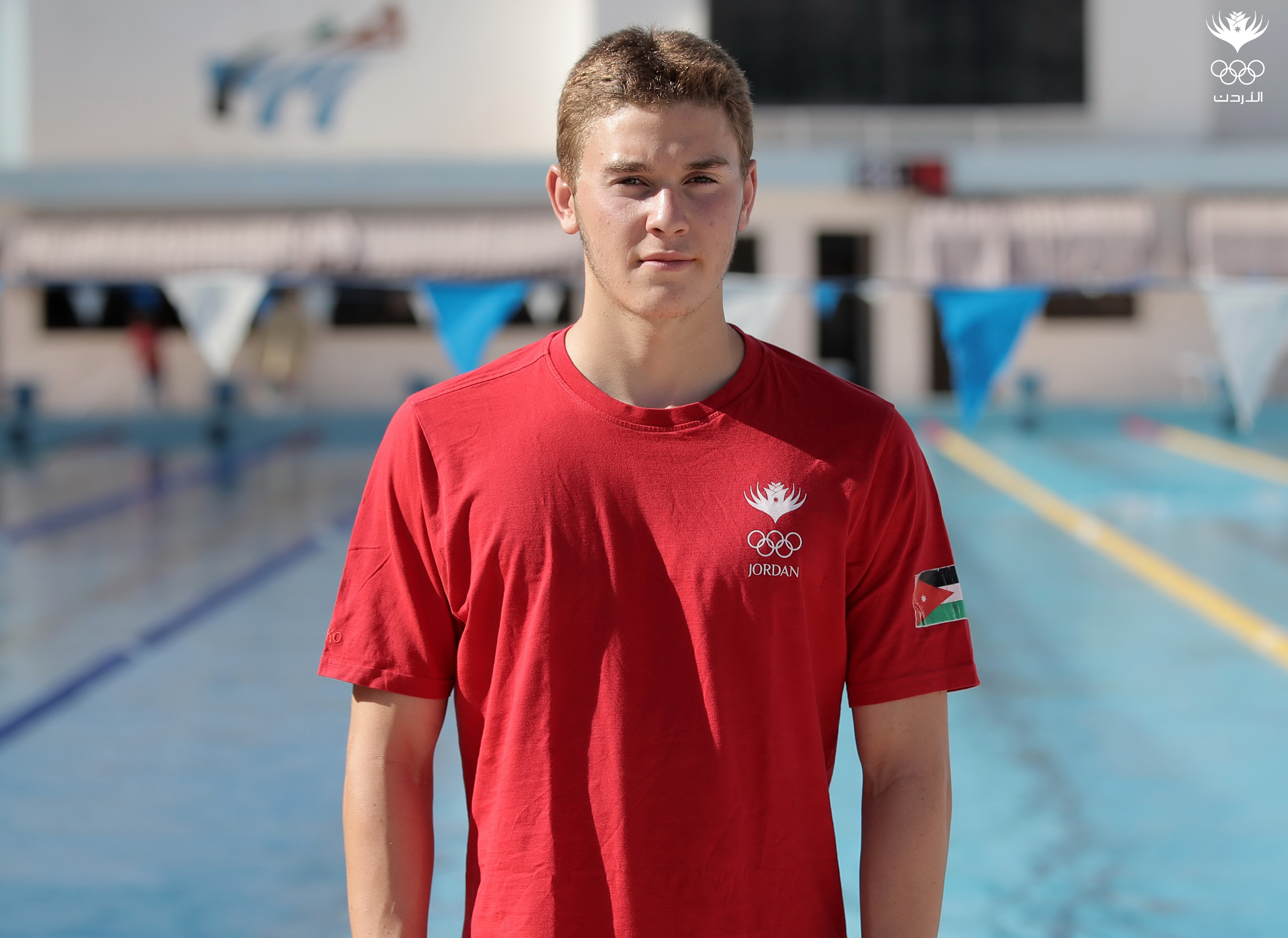

Personal information
- Native name: عمرو باسل عيسى الور
- Full name: Amro Basil Issa Al-Wir
- Nationality: Jordanian
- Born: 23 January 2001 (age 25) Amman, Jordan

Sport
- Sport: Swimming
- College team: University of Florida
Medal record
Men's swimming
Representing Jordan
Arab Games
Gold medal – first place	2023 Algeria	100 m breaststroke
Gold medal – first place	2023 Algeria	200 m breaststroke
Silver medal – second place	2023 Algeria	50 m breaststroke
Silver medal – second place	2023 Algeria	4×100 m medley
Bronze medal – third place	2023 Algeria	200 m medley

Amro Basil Issa Al-Wir (Arabic: عمرو باسل عيسى الور; born 23 January 2001) is a Jordanian swimmer. He competed in the 2020 Summer Olympics.
