= South Korea at the 2022 World Aquatics Championships =

- Flag of South Korea
- FINA code: KOR
- National federation: Korea Swimming Federation

in Budapest, Hungary
- Competitors: 35 in 4 sports
- Medals Ranked 19th: Gold 0 Silver 1 Bronze 0 Total 1

World Aquatics Championships appearances
- 1973; 1975; 1978; 1982; 1986; 1991; 1994; 1998; 2001; 2003; 2005; 2007; 2009; 2011; 2013; 2015; 2017; 2019; 2022; 2023; 2024

South Korea competed at the 2022 World Aquatics Championships in Budapest, Hungary from 18 June to 3 July.

== Medalists ==
Medal	Name	Sport	Event	Date
Silver	Hwang Sun-woo	Swimming	Men's 200 metre freestyle	20 June

== Artistic swimming ==
South Korea entered 3 artistic swimmers.

Women

Athlete	Event	Preliminaries		Final	
Athlete	Event	Points	Rank	Points	Rank
Lee Ri-young	Solo technical routine	80.5753	12 Q	80.5294	12
Lee Ri-young	Solo free routine	80.6000	14	did not advance	
Hur Yoon-seo; Lee Ri-young	Duet technical routine	80.6840	12 Q	80.3069	12
Hur Yoon-seo; Lee Ri-young	Duet free routine	80.9000	15	did not advance	

== Diving ==
South Korea entered 5 divers.

Men

Athlete	Event	Preliminaries		Semifinals		Final	
Athlete	Event	Points	Rank	Points	Rank	Points	Rank
Yi Jaeg-yeong	1 m springboard	333.30	19	—		did not advance	
Yi Jaeg-yeong	3 m springboard	347.30	28	did not advance			

Women

Athlete	Event	Preliminaries		Semifinals		Final	
Athlete	Event	Points	Rank	Points	Rank	Points	Rank
Cho Eun-bi	1 m springboard	187.75	39	—		did not advance	
Cho Eun-bi	10 m platform	232.80	24	did not advance			
Kim Su-ji	1 m springboard	234.95	18	—		did not advance	
Kim Su-ji	3 m springboard	273.75	13 Q	257.05	16	did not advance	

Mixed

Athlete	Event	Preliminaries		Final	
Athlete	Event	Points	Rank	Points	Rank
Cho Eun-bi; Yi Jaeg-yeong	Team event	—		332.85	7
Yi Jaeg-yeong; Kim Su-ji	Synchronized 3 m springboard	—		275.82	6
Yi Jaeg-yeong; Cho Eun-bi	Synchronized 10 m platform	—		249.39	7

== Open water swimming ==
South Korea entered 8 open water swimmers (4 male and 4 female)

Men

Athlete	Event	Time	Rank
Choi Yong-jin	10 km	2:01:50.1	41
Kim Min-seok	5 km	59:59.2	45
Lee Chang-min	5 km	1:00:17.9	49
Park Jae-hun	10 km	2:01:21.3	36

Women

Athlete	Event	Time	Rank
Kim Jin-ha	5 km	1:05:33.4	43
Lee Hae-rim	10 km	2:13:08.6	43
Lee Jong-min	5 km	1:01:07.7	30
Park Jung-ju	10 km	2:18:11.9	48

Mixed

Athlete	Event	Time	Rank
Park Jae-hun; Lee Chang-min; Lee Hae-rim; Lee Jeong-min	Team	Disqualified	

== Swimming ==
South Korea entered 22 swimmers.

Men

Athlete	Event	Heat		Semifinal		Final	
Athlete	Event	Time	Rank	Time	Rank	Time	Rank
Cho Sung-jae	100 m breaststroke	1:00.37	13 Q	59.75	11	did not advance	
Cho Sung-jae	200 m breaststroke	2:10.69	11 Q	2:09.81	9	did not advance	
Choi Dong-yeol	50 m breaststroke	27.55	12 Q	27.34	9	did not advance	
Hwang Sun-woo	100 m freestyle	48.61	17 Q	48.08	11	did not advance	
Hwang Sun-woo	200 m freestyle	1:45.79	2 Q	1:45.46	3 Q	1:44.47 NR	2nd place, silver medalist(s)
Ji Yu-chan	50 m freestyle	22.19	17	did not advance			
Kim Ji-hun	50 m butterfly	24.02	36	did not advance			
Kim Min-seop	200 m butterfly	1:57.43	19	did not advance			
Kim Min-seop	400 m individual medley	4:28.35	25	—		did not advance	
Kim Min-suk	200 m individual medley	2:00.88	20	did not advance			
Kim Woo-min	400 m freestyle	3:45.87	6 Q	—		3:45.64	6
Kim Woo-min	800 m freestyle	7:53.27	14	—		did not advance	
Kim Woo-min	1500 m freestyle	15:08.50	12	—		did not advance	
Lee Ju-ho	50 m backstroke	25.31	20	did not advance			
Lee Ju-ho	100 m backstroke	53.84	12 Q	54.07	15	did not advance	
Lee Ju-ho	200 m backstroke	1:57.89	9 Q	1:57.55	12	did not advance	
Moon Seung-woo	100 m butterfly	53.58	38	did not advance			
Moon Seung-woo	200 m butterfly	1:59.81	27	did not advance			
Hwang Sun-woo; Lee Yoo-yeon; Kim Ji-hun; Kim Min-joon	4 × 100 m freestyle relay	3:15.68 NR	12	—		did not advance	
Hwang Sun-woo; Kim Woo-min; Lee Yoo-yeon; Lee Ho-joon	4 × 200 m freestyle relay	7:08.49 NR	4 Q	—		7:06.93 NR	6
Lee Ju-ho; Moon Seung-woo; Cho Sung-jae; Hwang Sun-woo	4 × 100 m medley relay	3:36.28	13	—		did not advance	

Women

Athlete	Event	Heat		Semifinal		Final	
Athlete	Event	Time	Rank	Time	Rank	Time	Rank
Han Da-kyung	400 m freestyle	4:13.29	19	—		did not advance	
Han Da-kyung	800 m freestyle	8:49.18	18	—		did not advance	
Han Da-kyung	1500 m freestyle	16:47.45	18	—		did not advance	
Hur Yeon-kyung	100 m freestyle	55.50	23	did not advance			
Jeong So-eun	50 m freestyle	25.53	20	did not advance			
Jeong So-eun	50 m butterfly	26.40	13 Q	26.32	14	did not advance	
Jung Hyun-young	200 m freestyle	2:02.64	26	did not advance			
Kim Seo-yeong	100 m butterfly	did not start		did not advance			
Kim Seo-yeong	200 m individual medley	2:11.29	9 Q	2:10.47	5 Q	2:11.30	6
Lee Eun-ji	50 m backstroke	28.38	15 Q	28.26	15	did not advance	
Lee Eun-ji	100 m backstroke	1:00.78	12 Q	1:00.58	11	did not advance	
Lee Eun-ji	200 m backstroke	2:13.30	13 Q	2:10.48	10	did not advance	
Moon Su-a	100 m breaststroke	1:08.50	21	did not advance			
Moon Su-a	200 m breaststroke	2:27.91	15 Q	2:26.64	14	did not advance	
Jeong So-eun; Hur Yeon-kyung; Jung Hyun-young; Ko Mi-so	4 × 100 m freestyle relay	3:42.94	9	—		did not advance	
Kim Seo-yeong; Jung Hyun-young; Hur Yeon-kyung; Jo Hyun-ju	4 × 200 m freestyle relay	8:13.00	12	—		did not advance	
Lee Eun-ji; Moon Su-a; Jeong So-eun; Hur Yeon-kyung	4 × 100 m medley relay	4:05.29	11	—		did not advance	

Mixe

Athlete	Event	Heat		Final	
Athlete	Event	Time	Rank	Time	Rank
Hwang Sun-woo; Lee Yoo-yeon; Jeong So-eun; Hur Yeon-kyung	4 × 100 m freestyle relay	3:29.35 NR	11	did not advance	
Lee Ju-ho; Choi Dong-yeol; Kim Seo-yeong; Jeong So-eun	4 × 100 m medley relay	Disqualified		did not advance	
