= United States at the 2022 World Aquatics Championships =

- Flag of the United States
- World Aquatics code: USA
- National federation: United States Aquatic Sports
- Website: usaquaticsports.org

in Budapest, Hungary
- Competitors: 101 in 5 sports
- Medals Ranked 1st: Gold 18 Silver 14 Bronze 17 Total 49

World Aquatics Championships appearances
- 1973; 1975; 1978; 1982; 1986; 1991; 1994; 1998; 2001; 2003; 2005; 2007; 2009; 2011; 2013; 2015; 2017; 2019; 2022; 2023; 2024; 2025

The United States competed at the 2022 World Aquatics Championships in Budapest, Hungary from 18 June to 3 July.

== Medalists ==
Medal	Name	Sport	Event	Date
Gold	Katie Ledecky	Swimming	Women's 400 metre freestyle	June 18
Gold	Hunter Armstrong*; Brooks Curry; Caeleb Dressel; Ryan Held; Justin Ress	Swimming	Men's 4 × 100 metre freestyle relay	June 18
Gold	Torri Huske	Swimming	Women's 100 metre butterfly	June 19
Gold	Caeleb Dressel	Swimming	Men's 50 metre butterfly	June 19
Gold	Alex Walsh	Swimming	Women's 200 metre individual medley	June 19
Gold	Katie Ledecky	Swimming	Women's 1500 metre freestyle	June 20
Gold	Regan Smith	Swimming	Women's 100 metre backstroke	June 20
Gold	Bobby Finke	Swimming	Men's 800 metre freestyle	June 21
Gold	Nic Fink	Swimming	Men's 50 metre breaststroke	June 21
Gold	Michael Andrew*; Hunter Armstrong; Erika Brown*; Claire Curzan; Nic Fink; Torri Huske; Lilly King*; Ryan Murphy*	Swimming	Mixed 4×100 metre medley relay	June 21
Gold	Hali Flickinger*; Katie Ledecky; Bella Sims; Leah Smith; Alex Walsh*; Claire Weinstein	Swimming	Women's 4×200 metre freestyle relay	June 22
Gold	Lilly King	Swimming	Women's 200 metre breaststroke	June 23
Gold	Ryan Murphy	Swimming	Men's 200 metre backstroke	June 23
Gold	Coby Carrozza*; Carson Foster; Trey Freeman*; Trenton Julian; Drew Kibler; Kieran Smith	Swimming	Men's 4×200 metre freestyle relay	June 23
Gold	Katie Ledecky	Swimming	Women's 800 metre freestyle	June 24
Gold	Justin Ress	Swimming	Men's 50 metre backstroke	June 25
Gold	Erika Brown*; Claire Curzan; Lilly King; Natalie Hinds*; Torri Huske; Regan Smith; Alex Walsh*; Rhyan White*	Swimming	Women's 4×100 metre medley relay	June 25
Gold	United States women's national water polo team: Rachel Fattal; Kaleigh Gilchrist; Stephania Haralabidis; Ashleigh Johnson; Ava Johnson; Amanda Longan; Denise Mammolito; Maddie Musselman; Ryan Neushul; Tara Prentice; Jordan Raney; Margaret Steffens; Bayley Weber	Water polo	Women's tournament	July 2
Silver	Carson Foster	Swimming	Men's 400 metre individual medley	June 18
Silver	Katie Grimes	Swimming	Women's 1500 metre freestyle	June 20
Silver	Ryan Murphy	Swimming	Men's 100 metre backstroke	June 20
Silver	Hali Flickinger	Swimming	Women's 200 metre butterfly	June 22
Silver	Katharine Berkoff	Swimming	Women's 50 metre backstroke	June 22
Silver	Carson Foster	Swimming	Men's 200 metre individual medley	June 22
Silver	Michael Andrew	Swimming	Men's 50 metre freestyle	June 24
Silver	Phoebe Bacon	Swimming	Women's 200 metre backstroke	June 24
Silver	Hunter Armstrong	Swimming	Men's 50 metre backstroke	June 25
Silver	Bobby Finke	Swimming	Men's 1500 metre freestyle	June 25
Silver	Katie Grimes	Swimming	Women's 400 metre individual medley	June 25
Silver	Michael Andrew; Hunter Armstrong*; Brooks Curry*; Nic Fink; Ryan Held; Trenton Julian*; Ryan Murphy	Swimming	Men's 4×100 metre medley relay	June 25
Silver	Sarah Bacon	Diving	Women's 1 metre springboard	June 29
Silver	Delaney Schnell; Katrina Young	Diving	Women's 10 metre synchronized platform	June 30
Bronze	Chase Kalisz	Swimming	Men's 400 metre individual medley	June 18
Bronze	Leah Smith	Swimming	Women's 400 metre freestyle	June 18
Bronze	Erika Brown; Mallory Comerford*; Claire Curzan; Kate Douglass; Natalie Hinds*; Torri Huske	Swimming	Women's 4×100 metre freestyle relay	June 18
Bronze	Nic Fink	Swimming	Men's 100 metre breaststroke	June 19
Bronze	Michael Andrew	Swimming	Men's 50 metre butterfly	June 19
Bronze	Leah Hayes	Swimming	Women's 200 metre individual medley	June 19
Bronze	Claire Curzan	Swimming	Women's 100 metre backstroke	June 20
Bronze	Hunter Armstrong	Swimming	Men's 100 metre backstroke	June 20
Bronze	Michael Andrew	Swimming	Men's 50 metre breaststroke	June 21
Bronze	Torri Huske	Swimming	Women's 100 metre freestyle	June 23
Bronze	Kate Douglass	Swimming	Women's 200 metre breaststroke	June 23
Bronze	Shaine Casas	Swimming	Men's 200 metre backstroke	June 23
Bronze	Rhyan White	Swimming	Women's 200 metre backstroke	June 24
Bronze	Erika Brown*; Brooks Curry; Claire Curzan; Kate Douglass*; Ryan Held; Torri Huske; Drew Kibler*	Swimming	Mixed 4×100 metre freestyle relay	June 24
Bronze	Erika Brown	Swimming	Women's 50 metre freestyle	June 25
Bronze	Emma Weyant	Swimming	Women's 400 metre individual medley	June 25
Bronze	Delaney Schnell; Carson Tyler	Diving	Mixed 10 metre synchronized platform	July 1

== Awards ==
- 2022 FINA World Championships: Best Team

== Artistic swimming ==
Women

Athlete	Event	Preliminaries		Final	
Athlete	Event	Points	Rank	Points	Rank
Anita Alvarez	Solo technical routine	85.4685	6 Q	86.2807	6
Anita Alvarez	Solo free routine	87.6333	7 Q	87.6333	7
Anita Alvarez; Megumi Field	Duet technical routine	85.5281	8 Q	86.4262	7
Megumi Field; Natalia Vega	Duet free routine	86.6667	9 Q	87.0000	9
Yujin Chang; Jaime Czarkowksi; Elizabeth Davidson; Ivy Davis; Megumi Field; Keana Hunter; Dani Ramirez; Natalia Vega	Team technical routine	85.6085	6 Q	86.9907	6
Anita Alvarez; Jaime Czarkowksi; Elizabeth Davidson; Ivy Davis; Megumi Field; Keana Hunter; Dani Ramirez; Natalia Vega	Team free routine	88.3000	8 Q	87.4667	9
Elisa Brunel; Yujin Chang; Claudia Coletti; Jaime Czarkowksi; Elizabeth Davidson; Ivy Davis; Emily Ding; Keana Hunter; Dani Ramirez; Natalia Vega	Highlight routine	87.5000	6 Q	87.8667	5

Mixed

Athlete	Event	Preliminaries		Final	
Athlete	Event	Points	Rank	Points	Rank
Claudia Coletti; Kenny Gaudet	Duet technical routine	82.0709	5 Q	82.8966	5
Claudia Coletti; Kenny Gaudet	Duet free routine	83.6000	5 Q	85.2000	5

== Diving ==
On May 19, 2022, 16 athletes were named to the World Championships roster.

Men

Athlete	Event	Preliminaries		Semifinals		Final	
Athlete	Event	Points	Rank	Points	Rank	Points	Rank
Zach Cooper	10 m platform	382.45	11 Q	373.05	13	Did not advance	
Tyler Downs	3 m springboard	362.55	20	Did not advance			
Tyler Downs	1 m springboard	367.40	4 Q	—		293.10	12
Joshua Hedberg	10 m platform	429.15	5 Q	388.60	11 Q	375.10	11
Jordan Rzepka	1 m springboard	365.80	6 Q	—		372.05	6
Carson Tyler	3 m springboard	346.75	31	Did not advance			
Tyler Downs; Quinn Henninger	3 m synchronized springboard	299.43	15	—		Did not advance	
Zach Cooper; Max Flory	10 m synchronized platform	328.38	10 Q	—		358.17	8

Women

Athlete	Event	Preliminaries		Semifinals		Final	
Athlete	Event	Points	Rank	Points	Rank	Points	Rank
Sarah Bacon	1 m springboard	257.15	3 Q	—		276.65	2nd place, silver medalist(s)
Sarah Bacon	3 m springboard	324.60	3 Q	294.60	7 Q	314.25	5
Kristen Hayden	3 m springboard	302.00	5 Q	270.30	13	Did not advance	
Maggie Merriman	10 m platform	291.90	9 Q	269.30	15	Did not advance	
Brooke Schultz	1 m springboard	246.45	11 Q	—		244.20	10
Daryn Wright	10 m platform	303.45	7 Q	302.00	10 Q	277.10	9
Kristen Hayden; Brooke Schultz	3 m synchronized springboard	257.40	7 Q	—		273.90	7
Delaney Schnell; Katrina Young	10 m synchronized platform	296.28	2 Q	—		299.40	2nd place, silver medalist(s)

Mixed

Athlete	Event	Final	
Athlete	Event	Points	Rank
Kristen Hayden; Quinn Henninger	3 m synchronized springboard	271.86	8
Delaney Schnell; Carson Tyler	10 m synchronized platform	315.90	3rd place, bronze medalist(s)
Max Flory; Daryn Wright	Team	319.60	8

== Open water swimming ==
On May 28, 2022, 9 athletes were named to the world championships roster.

Men

Athlete	Event	Time	Rank
Brennan Gravley	Men's 5 km	54:28.40	=10
Brennan Gravley	Men's 10 km	1:53:43.40	12
Dylan Gravley	Men's 10 km	1:53:45.80	13
Simon Lamar	Men's 5 km	56:21.70	15
Simon Lamar	Men's 25 km	5:06:15.30	12
Joey Tepper	Men's 25 km	DNF	

Women

Athlete	Event	Time	Rank
Anna Auld	Women's 5 km	1:00:57.20	20
Anna Auld	Women's 25 km	5:26:25.60	7
Mariah Denigan	Women's 10 km	2:02:54.10	15
Katie Grimes	Women's 10 km	2:02:37.20	5
Kensey McMahon	Women's 25 km	5:30:19.10	10
Summer Smith	Women's 5 km	1:00:02.20	12

Mixed

Athlete	Event	Time	Rank
Charlie Clark; Mariah Denigan; Brennan Gravley; Bella Sims	Team	1:05:50.50	7

== Swimming ==
On May 1, 2022, 41 athletes were named to the World Championships roster. On May 5, the final roster additions were announced.

Men

Athlete	Event	Heat		Semifinal		Final	
Athlete	Event	Time	Rank	Time	Rank	Time	Rank
Michael Andrew	50 m breaststroke	26.71	2 Q	26.73	2 Q	26.72	3rd place, bronze medalist(s)
Michael Andrew	100 m breaststroke	58.96	3 Q	59.63	9	Did not advance	
Michael Andrew	50 m butterfly	22.89	4 Q	22.87	4 Q	22.79	3rd place, bronze medalist(s)
Michael Andrew	100 m butterfly	51.57	7 Q	51.28	8 Q	51.11	4
Michael Andrew	50 m freestyle	21.74	3 Q	21.80	=5 Q	21.41	2nd place, silver medalist(s)
Hunter Armstrong	50 m backstroke	24.63	4 Q	24.16	2 Q	24.14	2nd place, silver medalist(s)
Hunter Armstrong	100 m backstroke	52.81	1 Q	52.37	3 Q	51.98	3rd place, bronze medalist(s)
Shaine Casas	200 m backstroke	1:56.66	1 Q	1:56.90	6 Q	1:55.35	3rd place, bronze medalist(s)
Charlie Clark	800 m freestyle	7:51.59	12	—		Did not advance	
Charlie Clark	1500 m freestyle	15:00.33	10	—		Did not advance	
Brooks Curry	100 m freestyle	48.38	10 Q	47.90	7 Q	48.00	5
Caeleb Dressel	50 m butterfly	22.88	=2 Q	22.79	=2 Q	22.57	1st place, gold medalist(s)
Caeleb Dressel	100 m butterfly	WD					
Caeleb Dressel	50 m freestyle	WD					
Caeleb Dressel	100 m freestyle	47.95	2 Q	WD			
Nic Fink	50 m breaststroke	26.85	4 Q	26.74	3 Q	26.45 NR	1st place, gold medalist(s)
Nic Fink	100 m breaststroke	58.81	2 Q	58.55	2 Q	58.65	3rd place, bronze medalist(s)
Nic Fink	200 m breaststroke	2:10.27	9 Q	2:09.23	7 Q	2:09.05	5
Bobby Finke	800 m freestyle	7:46.36	6 Q	—		7:39.36 AM	1st place, gold medalist(s)
Bobby Finke	1500 m freestyle	14:50.71	3 Q	—		14:36.70 AM	2nd place, silver medalist(s)
Carson Foster	200 m individual medley	1:57.94	1 Q	1:56.44	2 Q	1:55.71	2nd place, silver medalist(s)
Carson Foster	400 m individual medley	4:09.60	2 Q	—		4:06.56	2nd place, silver medalist(s)
Trey Freeman	400 m freestyle	3:46.12	7 Q	—		3:46.53	8
Trenton Julian	200 m butterfly	1:55.04	4 Q	1:56.45	16	Did not advance	
Chase Kalisz	200 m individual medley	1:58.25	2 Q	1:56.76	4 Q	1:56.43	4
Chase Kalisz	400 m individual medley	4:10.32	3 Q	—		4:07.47	3rd place, bronze medalist(s)
Drew Kibler	200 m freestyle	1:46.13	5 Q	1:45.54	6 Q	1:45.01	4
Ryan Murphy	100 m backstroke	53.42	6 Q	52.80	6 Q	51.97	2nd place, silver medalist(s)
Ryan Murphy	200 m backstroke	1:56.96	3 Q	1:55.43	1 Q	1:54.52	1st place, gold medalist(s)
Justin Ress	50 m backstroke	24.24	1 Q	24.14	1 Q	24.12	1st place, gold medalist(s)
Kieran Smith	200 m freestyle	1:46.73	11 Q	1:46.06	8 Q	1:45.16	6
Kieran Smith	400 m freestyle	3:45.70	5 Q	—		3:46.43	7
Charlie Swanson	200 m breaststroke	2:09.36	3 Q	2:09.89	11	Did not advance	
Luca Urlando	200 m butterfly	1:55.94	7 Q	1:54.50	5 Q	1:54.92	5
Hunter Armstrong*; Brooks Curry; Caeleb Dressel; Ryan Held; Justin Ress	4×100 m freestyle relay	3:10.80	1 Q	—		3:09.34	1st place, gold medalist(s)
Coby Carrozza*; Carson Foster; Trey Freeman*; Trenton Julian; Drew Kibler; Kieran Smith	4×200 m freestyle relay	7:04.39	1 Q	—		7:00.24	1st place, gold medalist(s)
Michael Andrew; Hunter Armstrong*; Brooks Curry*; Nic Fink; Ryan Held; Trenton Julian*; Ryan Murphy	4×100 m medley relay	3:32.91	1 Q	—		3:27.79	2nd place, silver medalist(s)

Women

Athlete	Event	Heat		Semifinal		Final	
Athlete	Event	Time	Rank	Time	Rank	Time	Rank
Katharine Berkoff	50 m backstroke	27.49	2 Q	27.40	5 Q	27.39	2nd place, silver medalist(s)
Phoebe Bacon	200 m backstroke	2:07.89	1 Q	2:05.93	1 Q	2:05.12	2nd place, silver medalist(s)
Erika Brown	50 m freestyle	24.71	4 Q	24.59	4 Q	24.38	3rd place, bronze medalist(s)
Claire Curzan	100 m backstroke	59.09	3 Q	58.96	3 Q	58.67	3rd place, bronze medalist(s)
Claire Curzan	50 m butterfly	25.93	5 Q	25.67	7 Q	25.43	5
Claire Curzan	100 m butterfly	57.48	4 Q	56.93	3 Q	56.74	5
Claire Curzan	100 m freestyle	54.28	=11 Q	53.62	7 Q	53.81	8
Kate Douglass	200 m breaststroke	2:25.54	4 Q	2:23.79	4 Q	2:23.20	3rd place, bronze medalist(s)
Hali Flickinger	200 m butterfly	2:07.31	2 Q	2:05.90	2 Q	2:06.08	2nd place, silver medalist(s)
Katie Grimes	1500 m freestyle	15:57.05	3 Q	—		15:44.89	2nd place, silver medalist(s)
Katie Grimes	400 m individual medley	4:36.68	2 Q	—		4:32.67	2nd place, silver medalist(s)
Leah Hayes	200 m individual medley	2:09.81	2 Q	2:09.82	2 Q	2:08.91 WJR	3rd place, bronze medalist(s)
Torri Huske	50 m butterfly	26.10	10 Q	25.38 AM	2 Q	25.45	6
Torri Huske	100 m butterfly	56.82	1 Q	56.29	1 Q	55.64 NR	1st place, gold medalist(s)
Torri Huske	50 m freestyle	24.91	8 Q	24.63	7 Q	24.64	6
Torri Huske	100 m freestyle	53.72	3 Q	53.04	3 Q	52.92	3rd place, bronze medalist(s)
Lilly King	50 m breaststroke	30.70	=9 Q	30.35	8 Q	30.40	7
Lilly King	100 m breaststroke	1:06.65	7 Q	1:06.40	8 Q	1:06.07	4
Lilly King	200 m breaststroke	2:24.46	2 Q	2:22.58	2 Q	2:22.41	1st place, gold medalist(s)
Annie Lazor	50 m breaststroke	30.99	15 Q	30.89	13	Did not advance	
Annie Lazor	100 m breaststroke	1:06.33	3 Q	DSQ		Did not advance	
Katie Ledecky	400 m freestyle	3:59.79	1 Q	—		3:58.15 CR	1st place, gold medalist(s)
Katie Ledecky	800 m freestyle	8:17.51	1 Q	—		8:08.04	1st place, gold medalist(s)
Katie Ledecky	1500 m freestyle	15:47.02	1 Q	—		15:30.15	1st place, gold medalist(s)
Leah Smith	200 m freestyle	1:57.22	=3 Q	1:56.90	9	Did not advance	
Leah Smith	400 m freestyle	4:04.43	5 Q	—		4:02.08	3rd place, bronze medalist(s)
Leah Smith	800 m freestyle	8:25.19	3 Q	—		8:20.04	4
Regan Smith	50 m backstroke	27.70	4 Q	27.29	=2 Q	27.47	=5
Regan Smith	100 m backstroke	58.31	1 Q	57.65	1 Q	58.22	1st place, gold medalist(s)
Regan Smith	200 m butterfly	2:09.02	5 Q	2:07.13	3 Q	2:06.79	4
Alex Walsh	200 m individual medley	2:09.41	1 Q	2:08.74	1 Q	2:07.13	1st place, gold medalist(s)
Claire Weinstein	200 m freestyle	1:58.76	15 Q	1:56.94	10	Did not advance	
Emma Weyant	400 m individual medley	4:38.52	3 Q	—		4:36.00	3rd place, bronze medalist(s)
Rhyan White	200 m backstroke	2:09.12	4 Q	2:07.04	3 Q	2:06.96	3rd place, bronze medalist(s)
Erika Brown; Mallory Comerford*; Claire Curzan; Kate Douglass; Natalie Hinds*; Torri Huske	4×100 m freestyle relay	3:35.23	2 Q	—		3:32.58	3rd place, bronze medalist(s)
Hali Flickinger*; Katie Ledecky; Bella Sims; Leah Smith; Alex Walsh*; Claire Weinstein	4×200 m freestyle relay	7:49.25	3 Q	—		7:41.45 CR	1st place, gold medalist(s)
Erika Brown*; Claire Curzan; Lilly King; Natalie Hinds*; Torri Huske; Regan Smith; Alex Walsh*; Rhyan White*	4×100 m medley relay	4:00.06	7 Q	—		3:53.78	1st place, gold medalist(s)

Mixed

Athlete	Event	Heat		Semifinal		Final	
Athlete	Event	Time	Rank	Time	Rank	Time	Rank
Erika Brown*; Brooks Curry; Claire Curzan; Kate Douglass*; Ryan Held; Torri Huske; Drew Kibler*	4×100 m freestyle relay	3:24.48	1 Q	—		3:21.09	3rd place, bronze medalist(s)
Michael Andrew*; Hunter Armstrong; Erika Brown*; Claire Curzan; Nic Fink; Torri Huske; Lilly King*; Ryan Murphy*	4×100 m medley relay	3:43.16	1 Q	—		3:38.79	1st place, gold medalist(s)

Legend: (*) = Swimmers who participated in the heat only.

== Water polo ==
Summary

Team	Event	Group stage				Playoff	Quarterfinal	Semifinal	Final / BM	
Team	Event	Opposition Score	Opposition Score	Opposition Score	Rank	Opposition Score	Opposition Score	Opposition Score	Opposition Score	Rank
United States	Men's tournament	Serbia; L 13–17	Kazakhstan; W 17–4	Australia; W 14–9	2 P/Off	South Africa; W 24–2	Greece; L 11–16	Hungary; W 16–15	Serbia; L 10–13	6
United States	Women's tournament	South Africa; W 24–2	Netherlands; W 11–7	Argentina; W 23–3	1 QF	—	Spain; W 13–8	Italy; W 14–6	Hungary; W 9–7	1st place, gold medalist(s)

=== Men's tournament ===
Team roster

The following is American roster in the Water polo at the 2022 World Aquatics Championships – Men's tournament.

Head coach: (Serbia) Dejan Udovičić

- 1 Adrian Weinberg GK
- 2 Chase Dodd FP
- 3 Marko Vavić FP
- 4 Thomas Gruwell FP
- 5 Hannes Daube FP
- 6 Jake Ehrhardt FP
- 7 Ben Hallock CF
- 8 Dylan Woodhead FP
- 9 Alexander Bowen FP
- 10 Benjamin Stevenson FP
- 11 Matthew Farmer CF
- 12 Maxwell Irving FP
- 13 Drew Holland GK

Group play

Pos	Team	Pld	W	D	L	GF	GA	GD	Pts	Qualification
1	Serbia	3	3	0	0	45	21	+24	6	Quarterfinals
2	United States	3	2	0	1	44	30	+14	4	Playoffs
3	Australia	3	1	0	2	24	24	0	2	Playoffs
4	Kazakhstan	3	0	0	3	11	49	−38	0	

Source: Sportresult
Rules for classification: 1) points; 2) head-to-head points; 3) head-to-head goal difference; 4) head-to-head number of goals scored; 5) Goal difference.

21 June 2022; 19:30	Report	United States	13–17	Serbia	Szeged Tiszavirág Pool, Szeged; Referees: Georgios Stavridis (GRE), Raffaele Colombo (ITA)
21 June 2022; 19:30	Report	Score by quarters: 5–5, 2–3, 3–3, 3–6			Szeged Tiszavirág Pool, Szeged; Referees: Georgios Stavridis (GRE), Raffaele Colombo (ITA)
21 June 2022; 19:30	Report	Bowen 4	Goals	Mandić 4	Szeged Tiszavirág Pool, Szeged; Referees: Georgios Stavridis (GRE), Raffaele Colombo (ITA)

23 June 2022; 19:30	Report	Kazakhstan	4–17	United States	Szeged Tiszavirág Pool, Szeged; Referees: Levan Berishvili (GEO), Veselin Mišković (MNE)
23 June 2022; 19:30	Report	Score by quarters: 1–7, 2–3, 1–2, 0–5			Szeged Tiszavirág Pool, Szeged; Referees: Levan Berishvili (GEO), Veselin Mišković (MNE)
23 June 2022; 19:30	Report	Shakenov 2	Goals	Irving 4	Szeged Tiszavirág Pool, Szeged; Referees: Levan Berishvili (GEO), Veselin Mišković (MNE)

25 June 2022; 19:30	Report	United States	14–9	Australia	Szeged Tiszavirág Pool, Szeged; Referees: Levan Berishvili (GEO), Veselin Mišković (MNE)
25 June 2022; 19:30	Report	Score by quarters: 4–2, 4–2, 4–3, 2–2			Szeged Tiszavirág Pool, Szeged; Referees: Levan Berishvili (GEO), Veselin Mišković (MNE)
25 June 2022; 19:30	Report	Irving 4	Goals	three players 2	Szeged Tiszavirág Pool, Szeged; Referees: Levan Berishvili (GEO), Veselin Mišković (MNE)

Playoffs

27 June 2022; 18:30	Report	South Africa	2–24	United States	Alfréd Hajós National Swimming Stadium, Budapest; Referees: Adil Aimbetov (KAZ), Andrew Carney (AUS)
27 June 2022; 18:30	Report	Score by quarters: 0–6, 0–6, 0–5, 2–7			Alfréd Hajós National Swimming Stadium, Budapest; Referees: Adil Aimbetov (KAZ), Andrew Carney (AUS)
27 June 2022; 18:30	Report	Stone, Swanepoel 1	Goals	Dodd 6	Alfréd Hajós National Swimming Stadium, Budapest; Referees: Adil Aimbetov (KAZ), Andrew Carney (AUS)

Quarterfinals

29 June 2022; 13:00	Report	Greece	16–11	United States	Alfréd Hajós National Swimming Stadium, Budapest; Referees: Michiel Zwart (NED), Frank Ohme (GER)
29 June 2022; 13:00	Report	Score by quarters: 3–1, 4–6, 3–0, 6–4			Alfréd Hajós National Swimming Stadium, Budapest; Referees: Michiel Zwart (NED), Frank Ohme (GER)
29 June 2022; 13:00	Report	Argyropoulos 5	Goals	three players 3	Alfréd Hajós National Swimming Stadium, Budapest; Referees: Michiel Zwart (NED), Frank Ohme (GER)

5–8th place semifinals

1 July 2022; 21:00	Report	Hungary	15–16 (PSO)	United States	Alfréd Hajós National Swimming Stadium, Budapest; Referees: Maro Savinović (CRO), Raffaele Colombo (ITA)
1 July 2022; 21:00	Report	Score by quarters: 4–3, 2–2, 2–3, 3–3 PSO: 4–5			Alfréd Hajós National Swimming Stadium, Budapest; Referees: Maro Savinović (CRO), Raffaele Colombo (ITA)
1 July 2022; 21:00	Report	Manhercz, Nagy 3	Goals	Daube 3	Alfréd Hajós National Swimming Stadium, Budapest; Referees: Maro Savinović (CRO), Raffaele Colombo (ITA)

Fifth place game

3 July 2022; 17:00	Report	United States	10–13	Serbia	Alfréd Hajós National Swimming Stadium, Budapest; Referees: György Kun (HUN), Raffaele Colombo (ITA)
3 July 2022; 17:00	Report	Score by quarters: 3–3, 3–5, 1–3, 3–2			Alfréd Hajós National Swimming Stadium, Budapest; Referees: György Kun (HUN), Raffaele Colombo (ITA)
3 July 2022; 17:00	Report	Bowen 4	Goals	S. Rašović 4	Alfréd Hajós National Swimming Stadium, Budapest; Referees: György Kun (HUN), Raffaele Colombo (ITA)

=== Women's tournament ===
Team roster

The following is American roster in the Water polo at the 2022 World Aquatics Championships – Women's tournament.

Head coach: Adam Krikorian

- 1 Ashleigh Johnson GK
- 2 Maddie Musselman FP
- 3 Tara Prentice CF
- 4 Rachel Fattal FP
- 5 Ava Elizabeth Johnson CB
- 6 Maggie Steffens FP
- 7 Stephania Haralabidis FP
- 8 Ryann Neushul FP
- 9 Denise Mammolito FP
- 10 Kaleigh Gilchrist CF
- 11 Bayley Weber FP
- 12 Jordan Raney CB
- 13 Amanda Longan GK

Group play

Pos	Team	Pld	W	D	L	GF	GA	GD	Pts	Qualification
1	United States	3	3	0	0	58	12	+46	6	Quarterfinals
2	Netherlands	3	2	0	1	58	18	+40	4	Playoffs
3	Argentina	3	1	0	2	16	58	−42	2	Playoffs
4	South Africa	3	0	0	3	9	53	−44	0	

Source: Sportresult
Rules for classification: 1) points; 2) head-to-head points; 3) head-to-head goal difference; 4) head-to-head number of goals scored; 5) Goal difference.

20 June 2022; 18:00	Report	South Africa	2–24	United States	Debrecen Swimming Pool Complex, Debrecen; Referees: Megan Perry (NZL), Ivan Raković (SRB)
20 June 2022; 18:00	Report	Score by quarters: 0–7, 0–10, 1–3, 1–4			Debrecen Swimming Pool Complex, Debrecen; Referees: Megan Perry (NZL), Ivan Raković (SRB)
20 June 2022; 18:00	Report	Meecham, Zondo 1	Goals	Haralabidis 5	Debrecen Swimming Pool Complex, Debrecen; Referees: Megan Perry (NZL), Ivan Raković (SRB)

22 June 2022; 19:30	Report	United States	11–7	Netherlands	Debrecen Swimming Pool Complex, Debrecen; Referees: Ivan Raković (SRB), Megan Perry (NZL)
22 June 2022; 19:30	Report	Score by quarters: 3–2, 3–1, 3–2, 2–2			Debrecen Swimming Pool Complex, Debrecen; Referees: Ivan Raković (SRB), Megan Perry (NZL)
22 June 2022; 19:30	Report	Musselman 4	Goals	Van de Kraats, Moolhuijzen 2	Debrecen Swimming Pool Complex, Debrecen; Referees: Ivan Raković (SRB), Megan Perry (NZL)

24 June 2022; 18:00	Report	United States	23–3	Argentina	Debrecen Swimming Pool Complex, Debrecen; Referees: Harvey Hinds (CUR), Megan Perry (NZL)
24 June 2022; 18:00	Report	Score by quarters: 6–0, 5–0, 6–2, 6–1			Debrecen Swimming Pool Complex, Debrecen; Referees: Harvey Hinds (CUR), Megan Perry (NZL)
24 June 2022; 18:00	Report	Haralabidis, Weber 4	Goals	three players 1	Debrecen Swimming Pool Complex, Debrecen; Referees: Harvey Hinds (CUR), Megan Perry (NZL)

Quarterfinals

28 June 2022; 16:00	Report	United States	13–8	Spain	Alfréd Hajós National Swimming Stadium, Budapest; Referees: Georgios Stavridis (GRE), Frank Ohme (GER)
28 June 2022; 16:00	Report	Score by quarters: 3–3, 3–2, 5–3, 2–0			Alfréd Hajós National Swimming Stadium, Budapest; Referees: Georgios Stavridis (GRE), Frank Ohme (GER)
28 June 2022; 16:00	Report	Haralabidis 6	Goals	Forca, García Godoy 2	Alfréd Hajós National Swimming Stadium, Budapest; Referees: Georgios Stavridis (GRE), Frank Ohme (GER)

Semifinals

30 June 2022; 16:00	Report	Italy	6–14	United States	Alfréd Hajós National Swimming Stadium, Budapest; Referees: Georgios Stavridis (GRE), David Gómez (ESP)
30 June 2022; 16:00	Report	Score by quarters: 0–3, 2–3, 1–4, 3–4			Alfréd Hajós National Swimming Stadium, Budapest; Referees: Georgios Stavridis (GRE), David Gómez (ESP)
30 June 2022; 16:00	Report	Avegno, Bianconi 2	Goals	five players 2	Alfréd Hajós National Swimming Stadium, Budapest; Referees: Georgios Stavridis (GRE), David Gómez (ESP)

Final

2 July 2022; 20:00	Report	United States	9–7	Hungary	Alfréd Hajós National Swimming Stadium, Budapest; Referees: Boris Margeta (SLO), Frank Ohme (GER)
2 July 2022; 20:00	Report	Score by quarters: 2–1, 2–2, 3–1, 2–3			Alfréd Hajós National Swimming Stadium, Budapest; Referees: Boris Margeta (SLO), Frank Ohme (GER)
2 July 2022; 20:00	Report	Musselman 5	Goals	Gurisatti 3	Alfréd Hajós National Swimming Stadium, Budapest; Referees: Boris Margeta (SLO), Frank Ohme (GER)
