= Swimming at the 2022 World Aquatics Championships – Men's 200 metre butterfly =

Men's 200 metre butterfly at the 2022 World Aquatics Championships
- Venue: Danube Arena
- Location: Budapest, Hungary
- Dates: 20 June (heats and semifinals); 21 June (final)
- Competitors: 42 from 35 nations
- Winning time: 1:50.34 WR

Medalists
gold medal	Kristóf Milák	Hungary
silver medal	Léon Marchand	France
bronze medal	Tomoru Honda	Japan

The Men's 200 metre butterfly competition at the 2022 World Aquatics Championships was held on 20 and 21 June 2022.

== Records ==
Prior to the competition, the existing world and championship records were as follows.

World record	Kristóf Milák (HUN)	1:50.73	Gwangju, South Korea	24 July 2019
Competition record	Kristóf Milák (HUN)	1:50.73	Gwangju, South Korea	24 July 2019

The following new records were set during this competition.

Date	Event	Name	Nationality	Time	Record
21 June	Final	Kristóf Milák	Hungary	1:50.34	WR

== Results ==
=== Heats ===
The heats were started on 20 June at 09:37.

Rank	Heat	Lane	Name	Nationality	Time	Notes
1	5	4	Kristóf Milák	Hungary	1:54.10	Q
2	4	6	Noè Ponti	Switzerland	1:54.75	Q, NR
3	4	4	Tomoru Honda	Japan	1:54.94	Q
4	5	5	Trenton Julian	United States	1:55.04	Q
5	3	7	Alberto Razzetti	Italy	1:55.71	Q
6	4	2	Krzysztof Chmielewski	Poland	1:55.73	Q
7	3	4	Luca Urlando	United States	1:55.94	Q
8	4	5	Tamás Kenderesi	Hungary	1:56.09	Q
9	5	0	Kregor Zirk	Estonia	1:56.13	Q, NR
10	3	3	Leonardo de Deus	Brazil	1:56.35	Q
11	3	2	Giacomo Carini	Italy	1:56.38	Q
11	5	7	Léon Marchand	France	1:56.38	Q
13	4	0	Niu Guangsheng	China	1:56.48	Q
14	3	6	James Guy	Great Britain	1:56.63	Q
15	5	2	Takumi Terada	Japan	1:56.70	Q
16	3	5	Wang Kuan-hung	Chinese Taipei	1:56.87	Q
17	3	0	Héctor Ruvalcaba	Mexico	1:56.96	
18	5	3	Antani Ivanov	Bulgaria	1:57.00	
19	3	8	Kim Min-seop	South Korea	1:57.43	
20	4	7	Louis Croenen	Belgium	1:57.63	
21	4	3	Chen Juner	China	1:58.31	
22	5	8	Denys Kesil	Ukraine	1:58.36	
23	2	7	Jorge Otaiza	Venezuela	1:58.54	
24	5	1	Bowen Gough	Australia	1:58.66	
25	4	8	Sajan Prakash	India	1:58.67	
26	5	9	Velimir Stjepanović	Serbia	1:59.44	
27	4	1	Moon Seung-woo	South Korea	1:59.81	
28	4	9	Ong Jung Yi	Singapore	2:00.18	
29	2	2	Patrick Hussey	Canada	2:00.24	
30	2	6	Erick Gordillo	Guatemala	2:00.48	
31	2	1	Richard Nagy	Slovakia	2:00.83	
32	2	3	Nguyễn Duy Khoa Hồ	Vietnam	2:01.05	
33	3	1	Matheus Gonche	Brazil	2:01.65	
34	2	8	Felipe Baffico	Chile	2:01.99	
35	3	9	Navaphat Wongcharoen	Thailand	2:02.10	
36	2	4	Ramil Valizade	Azerbaijan	2:02.41	
37	2	5	Keanan Dols	Jamaica	2:04.04	
38	2	0	Simon Bachmann	Seychelles	2:06.70	
39	1	4	Salem Sabt	United Arab Emirates	2:08.21	
40	2	9	Gerald Hernández	Nicaragua	2:09.26	
41	1	5	Mubal Azzam Ibrahim	Maldives	2:36.74	
	1	3	Heni Mesfar	Tunisia	Disqualified	
	5	6	Chad le Clos	South Africa	Did not start	

=== Semifinals ===
The semifinals were started on 20 June at 19:35.

Rank	Heat	Lane	Name	Nationality	Time	Notes
1	2	4	Kristóf Milák	Hungary	1:52.39	Q
2	2	5	Tomoru Honda	Japan	1:54.01	Q
3	1	4	Noè Ponti	Switzerland	1:54.20	Q, NR
4	1	7	Léon Marchand	France	1:54.32	Q, NR
5	2	6	Luca Urlando	United States	1:54.50	Q
6	1	6	Tamás Kenderesi	Hungary	1:54.79	Q
7	2	3	Alberto Razzetti	Italy	1:54.87	Q
8	1	1	James Guy	Great Britain	1:54.91	Q
9	1	3	Krzysztof Chmielewski	Poland	1:55.01	
10	2	1	Niu Guangsheng	China	1:55.27	
11	2	2	Kregor Zirk	Estonia	1:55.62	NR
12	2	7	Giacomo Carini	Italy	1:55.74	
13	2	8	Takumi Terada	Japan	1:56.07	
14	1	2	Leonardo de Deus	Brazil	1:56.18	
15	1	8	Wang Kuan-hung	Chinese Taipei	1:56.23	
16	1	5	Trenton Julian	United States	1:56.45	

=== Final ===
The final was held on 21 at 18:54.

Rank	Lane	Name	Nationality	Time	Notes
1st place, gold medalist(s)	4	Kristóf Milák	Hungary	1:50.34	WR
2nd place, silver medalist(s)	6	Léon Marchand	France	1:53.37	NR
3rd place, bronze medalist(s)	5	Tomoru Honda	Japan	1:53.61	
4	3	Noè Ponti	Switzerland	1:54.29	
5	2	Luca Urlando	United States	1:54.92	
6	7	Tamás Kenderesi	Hungary	1:55.20	
7	1	Alberto Razzetti	Italy	1:55.52	
8	8	James Guy	Great Britain	1:55.54	
