= Swimming at the 2022 World Aquatics Championships – Men's 4 × 100 metre medley relay =

Men's 4 × 100 metre medley relay at the 2022 World Aquatics Championships
- Venue: Danube Arena
- Location: Budapest, Hungary
- Dates: 25 June (heats and final)
- Competitors: 90 from 20 nations
- Teams: 20
- Winning time: 3:27.51

Medalists
gold medal	Thomas Ceccon; Nicolò Martinenghi; Federico Burdisso; Alessandro Miressi; Piero Codia; Lorenzo Zazzeri	Italy
silver medal	Ryan Murphy; Nic Fink; Michael Andrew; Ryan Held; Hunter Armstrong; Trenton Julian; Brooks Curry	United States
bronze medal	Luke Greenbank; James Wilby; James Guy; Tom Dean; Jacob Peters; Lewis Burras	Great Britain

The Men's 4 × 100 metre medley relay competition at the 2022 World Aquatics Championships was held on 25 June 2022.

== Records ==
Prior to the competition, the existing world and championship records were as follows.

World record	United States	3:26.78	Tokyo, Japan	1 August 2021
Competition record	United States	3:27.28	Rome, Italy	2 August 2009

== Results ==
=== Heats ===
The heats were started at 09:21.

Rank	Heat	Lane	Nation	Swimmers	Time	Notes
1	3	4	United States	Hunter Armstrong (53.70); Nic Fink (59.57); Trenton Julian (51.35); Brooks Curry (48.29)	3:32.91	Q
2	2	6	France	Yohann Ndoye Brouard (53.12); Antoine Viquerat (1:00.42); Léon Marchand (52.09); Maxime Grousset (47.35)	3:32.98	Q
3	3	5	Italy	Thomas Ceccon (53.87); Nicolò Martinenghi (59.50); Piero Codia (51.71); Lorenzo Zazzeri (47.94)	3:33.02	Q
4	2	5	Australia	Mitchell Larkin (54.02); Zac Stubblety-Cook (1:00.18); Matthew Temple (51.20); Jack Cartwright (47.80)	3:33.20	Q
5	2	4	Great Britain	Luke Greenbank (54.28); James Wilby (59.47); Jacob Peters (51.91); Lewis Burras (47.90)	3:33.56	Q
6	2	3	China	Xu Jiayu (53.72); Qin Haiyang (59.37); Wang Changhao (51.94); Pan Zhanle (48.58)	3:33.61	Q
7	3	2	Germany	Ole Braunschweig (53.95); Lucas Matzerath (1:00.00); Jan Eric Friese (51.73); Rafael Miroslaw (48.30)	3:33.98	Q
8	2	7	Austria	Bernhard Reitshammer (53.99); Valentin Bayer (59.79); Simon Bucher (51.36); Heiko Gigler (47.92)	3:34.06	Q, NR
9	3	3	Japan	Ryosuke Irie (53.31); Ryuya Mura (1:00.08); Naoki Mizunuma (52.66); Katsuhiro Matsumoto (48.12)	3:34.17	
10	2	8	Brazil	Guilherme Basseto (54.81); João Gomes Júnior (59.50); Matheus Gonche (52.18); Luiz Gustavo Borges (48.17)	3:34.66	
11	3	6	Canada	Javier Acevedo (53.52); James Dergousoff (1:01.06); Joshua Liendo (51.26); Ruslan Gaziev (48.78)	3:35.62	
12	1	4	Spain	Hugo González (53.67); Carles Coll (1:01.10); Alberto Lozano (52.44); Sergio de Celis (48.89)	3:36.10	
13	1	3	South Korea	Lee Ju-ho (53.04); Moon Seung-woo (1:00.33); Cho Sung-jae (52.72); Hwang Sun-woo (49.19)	3:36.28	
14	2	2	Greece	Evangelos Makrygiannis (53.43); Konstantinos Meretsolias (1:00.17); Konstantinos Stamou (52.48); Dimitrios Markos (49.28)	3:36.36	
15	2	9	Chinese Taipei	Chuang Mu-lun (55.65); Cai Bing-rong (1:03.17); Wang Kuan-hung (53.39); Wang Hsing-hao (50.00)	3:42.21	
16	2	1	Vietnam	Trần Hưng Nguyên (58.53); Phạm Thanh Bảo (1:03.66); Hồ Nguyễn Duy Khoa (55.37); Hoàng Quý Phước (50.13)	3:47.69	
17	3	9	Paraguay	Charles Hockin (56.68); Renato Prono (1:04.35); Ben Hockin (54.75); Matheo Mateos (52.54)	3:48.32	
18	3	0	Thailand	Tonnam Kanteemool (57.41); Dulyawat Kaewsriyong (1:05.15); Navaphat Wongcharoen (53.80); Ratthawit Thammananthachote (53.69)	3:50.05	
	1	5	Hong Kong	Lau Shiu Yue (56.88); Adam Chillingworth; Nicholas Lim; Ian Ho	Disqualified	
	3	7	Lithuania	Erikas Grigaitis (55.61); Andrius Šidlauskas; Deividas Margevičius; Danas Rapšys	Disqualified	
	2	0	Israel		Did not start	
	3	1	Singapore		Did not start	
	3	8	Egypt		Did not start	

=== Final ===
The final was held at 19:20.

Rank	Lane	Nation	Swimmers	Time	Notes
1st place, gold medalist(s)	3	Italy	Thomas Ceccon (51.93); Nicolò Martinenghi (57.47); Federico Burdisso (50.63); Alessandro Miressi (47.48)	3:27.51	=ER
2nd place, silver medalist(s)	4	United States	Ryan Murphy (52.51); Nic Fink (57.86); Michael Andrew (50.06); Ryan Held (47.36)	3:27.79	
3rd place, bronze medalist(s)	2	Great Britain	Luke Greenbank (53.81); James Wilby (58.82); James Guy (51.23); Tom Dean (47.45)	3:31.31	
4	6	Australia	Isaac Cooper (54.29); Zac Stubblety-Cook (59.88); Matthew Temple (50.75); Kyle Chalmers (46.89)	3:31.81	
5	5	France	Yohann Ndoye Brouard (53.08); Antoine Viquerat (1:00.34); Léon Marchand (51.50); Maxime Grousset (47.45)	3:32.37	
6	1	Germany	Ole Braunschweig (53.94); Lucas Matzerath (59.32); Jan Eric Friese (51.03); Rafael Miroslaw (48.34)	3:32.63	
7	8	Austria	Bernhard Reitshammer (54.38); Valentin Bayer (59.73); Simon Bucher (51.04); Heiko Gigler (47.65)	3:32.80	NR
8	7	China	Wang Shun (55.19); Qin Haiyang (59.44); Wang Changhao (51.38); Pan Zhanle (48.61)	3:34.62	
