= Swimming at the 2022 World Aquatics Championships – Women's 200 metre freestyle =

Women's 200 metre freestyle at the 2022 World Aquatics Championships
- Venue: Danube Arena
- Location: Budapest, Hungary
- Dates: 20 June (heats and semifinals); 21 June (final)
- Competitors: 39 from 33 nations
- Winning time: 1:54.92

Medalists
gold medal	Yang Junxuan	China
silver medal	Mollie O'Callaghan	Australia
bronze medal	Tang Muhan	China

The Women's 200 metre freestyle competition at the 2022 World Aquatics Championships was held on 20 and 21 June 2022.

== Records ==
Prior to the competition, the existing world and championship records were as follows.

World record	Federica Pellegrini (ITA)	1:52.98	Rome, Italy	29 July 2009
Competition record	Federica Pellegrini (ITA)	1:52.98	Rome, Italy	29 July 2009

== Results ==
=== Heats ===
The heats were started on 20 June at 09:16.

Rank	Heat	Lane	Name	Nationality	Time	Notes
1	3	4	Yang Junxuan	China	1:56.58	Q
2	3	5	Madison Wilson	Australia	1:56.85	Q
3	3	6	Leah Smith	United States	1:57.22	Q
3	5	5	Penny Oleksiak	Canada	1:57.22	Q
5	4	5	Mollie O'Callaghan	Australia	1:57.28	Q
6	5	3	Freya Anderson	Great Britain	1:57.53	Q
7	4	1	Janja Šegel	Slovenia	1:57.71	Q
8	4	2	Stephanie Balduccini	Brazil	1:57.81	Q
9	3	3	Isabel Marie Gose	Germany	1:57.94	Q
10	4	3	Charlotte Bonnet	France	1:58.14	Q
11	4	6	Erika Fairweather	New Zealand	1:58.26	Q
12	4	4	Tang Muhan	China	1:58.28	Q
13	5	1	Marrit Steenbergen	Netherlands	1:58.33	Q
14	5	2	Taylor Ruck	Canada	1:58.41	Q
15	5	6	Claire Weinstein	United States	1:58.76	Q
16	3	2	Katja Fain	Slovenia	1:58.84	Q
17	3	7	Valentine Dumont	Belgium	1:58.86	
18	4	7	Nikolett Pádár	Hungary	1:58.90	
19	5	7	Freya Colbert	Great Britain	1:59.48	
20	4	8	Snæfríður Jórunnardóttir	Iceland	2:00.61	
21	3	1	Marlene Kahler	Austria	2:00.75	
22	3	8	Elisbet Gámez	Cuba	2:00.86	
23	5	8	Daria Golovaty	Israel	2:01.01	
24	2	5	Karen Durango	Colombia	2:01.61	
25	4	9	Ieva Maļuka	Latvia	2:02.43	
26	3	0	Jung Hyun-young	South Korea	2:02.64	
27	5	9	Sofia Åstedt	Sweden	2:03.22	
28	5	0	Aleksa Gold	Estonia	2:03.46	
29	3	9	Zhanet Angelova	Bulgaria	2:05.88	
30	2	3	Lucero Mejía	Guatemala	2:06.78	
31	2	4	Kamonchanok Kwanmuang	Thailand	2:07.20	
32	2	6	Jehanara Nabi	Pakistan	2:11.13	
33	2	2	Natalia Kuipers	U.S. Virgin Islands	2:12.20	
34	2	7	Bianca Mitchell	Antigua and Barbuda	2:13.84	
35	1	5	Tilly Collymore	Grenada	2:15.68	
36	2	1	Therese Soukup	Seychelles	2:16.23	
37	2	8	Zaira Forson	Ghana	2:20.83	
38	1	4	Charissa Panuve	Tonga	2:22.93	
39	1	3	Keana Santos	Guam	2:30.08	
	4	0	Gan Ching Hwee	Singapore	Did not start	
	5	4	Siobhán Haughey	Hong Kong	Did not start	

=== Semifinals ===
The semifinals were started on 20 June at 19:15.

Rank	Heat	Lane	Name	Nationality	Time	Notes
1	1	3	Freya Anderson	Great Britain	1:56.05	Q
2	1	4	Madison Wilson	Australia	1:56.31	Q
3	2	3	Mollie O'Callaghan	Australia	1:56.34	Q
4	1	2	Charlotte Bonnet	France	1:56.54	Q
5	2	4	Yang Junxuan	China	1:56.75	Q
6	1	1	Taylor Ruck	Canada	1:56.80	Q
7	2	2	Isabel Marie Gose	Germany	1:56.82	Q
8	1	7	Tang Muhan	China	1:56.87	Q
9	2	5	Leah Smith	United States	1:56.90	
10	2	8	Claire Weinstein	United States	1:56.94	
11	2	7	Erika Fairweather	New Zealand	1:57.43	
12	1	6	Stephanie Balduccini	Brazil	1:57.54	
13	1	8	Katja Fain	Slovenia	1:58.00	
14	2	6	Janja Šegel	Slovenia	1:58.10	
15	2	1	Marrit Steenbergen	Netherlands	1:58.93	
–	1	5	Penny Oleksiak	Canada	Disqualified	

=== Final ===
The final was held on 21 June at 18:17.

Rank	Lane	Name	Nationality	Time	Notes
1st place, gold medalist(s)	2	Yang Junxuan	China	1:54.92	
2nd place, silver medalist(s)	3	Mollie O'Callaghan	Australia	1:55.22	
3rd place, bronze medalist(s)	8	Tang Muhan	China	1:56.25	
4	4	Freya Anderson	Great Britain	1:56.68	
5	5	Madison Wilson	Australia	1:56.85	
6	6	Charlotte Bonnet	France	1:57.24	
6	7	Taylor Ruck	Canada	1:57.24	
8	1	Isabel Marie Gose	Germany	1:57.38	
