= Swimming at the 2022 World Aquatics Championships – Women's 200 metre breaststroke =

Women's 200 metre breaststroke at the 2022 World Aquatics Championships
- Venue: Danube Arena
- Location: Budapest, Hungary
- Dates: 22 June (heats and semifinals); 23 June (final)
- Competitors: 28 from 24 nations
- Winning time: 2:22.41

Medalists
| gold medal | Lilly King | United States |
| silver medal | Jenna Strauch | Australia |
| bronze medal | Kate Douglass | United States |

The Women's 200 metre breaststroke competition at the 2022 World Aquatics Championships was held on 22 and 23 June 2022.

== Records ==
Prior to the competition, the existing world and championship records were as follows.

| World record | Tatjana Schoenmaker (RSA) | 2:18.95 | Tokyo, Japan | 30 July 2021 |
| Competition record | Rikke Møller Pedersen (DEN) | 2:19.11 | Barcelona, Spain | 1 August 2013 |

== Results ==
=== Heats ===
The heats were started on 22 June at 09:36.

| Rank | Heat | Lane | Name | Nationality | Time | Notes |
|---|---|---|---|---|---|---|
| 1 | 2 | 6 | Kelsey Wog | Canada | 2:24.37 | Q |
| 2 | 3 | 4 | Lilly King | United States | 2:24.46 | Q |
| 3 | 3 | 3 | Kotryna Teterevkova | Lithuania | 2:24.79 | Q |
| 4 | 1 | 4 | Kate Douglass | United States | 2:25.54 | Q |
| 4 | 2 | 4 | Molly Renshaw | Great Britain | 2:25.54 | Q |
| 6 | 1 | 3 | Jenna Strauch | Australia | 2:25.56 | Q |
| 7 | 2 | 3 | Francesca Fangio | Italy | 2:25.70 | Q |
| 8 | 3 | 2 | Sophie Hansson | Sweden | 2:25.74 | Q |
| 9 | 3 | 5 | Abbie Wood | Great Britain | 2:25.95 | Q |
| 10 | 1 | 5 | Yu Jingyao | China | 2:26.07 | Q |
| 11 | 1 | 1 | Tes Schouten | Netherlands | 2:26.85 | Q |
| 12 | 2 | 5 | Lisa Mamié | Switzerland | 2:27.28 | Q |
| 13 | 1 | 6 | Abbey Harkin | Australia | 2:27.44 | Q |
| 14 | 3 | 7 | Kristýna Horská | Czech Republic | 2:27.84 | Q |
| 15 | 3 | 8 | Moon Su-a | South Korea | 2:27.91 | Q |
| 16 | 2 | 1 | Eszter Békési | Hungary | 2:27.95 | Q |
| 17 | 3 | 6 | Jessica Vall | Spain | 2:28.08 | |
| 18 | 1 | 7 | Melissa Rodríguez | Mexico | 2:28.19 | |
| 19 | 3 | 1 | Eneli Jefimova | Estonia | 2:28.51 | |
| 20 | 2 | 7 | Anastasia Gorbenko | Israel | 2:28.58 | |
| 21 | 2 | 2 | Tang Qianting | China | 2:29.35 | |
| 22 | 2 | 8 | Nikoleta Trníková | Slovakia | 2:29.45 | |
| 23 | 1 | 2 | Anna Elendt | Germany | 2:30.08 | |
| 24 | 3 | 0 | Letitia Sim | Singapore | 2:31.31 | |
| 25 | 1 | 0 | Kamila Isaieva | Ukraine | 2:32.53 | |
| 26 | 2 | 9 | Emily Santos | Panama | 2:38.72 | |
| 27 | 3 | 9 | Micaela Sierra | Uruguay | 2:39.05 | |
| | 1 | 8 | Macarena Ceballos | Argentina | Disqualified | |
| | 2 | 0 | Phiangkhwan Pawapotako | Thailand | Did not start | |

=== Semifinals ===
The Semifinals were started on 22 June at 19:22.

| Rank | Heat | Lane | Name | Nationality | Time | Notes |
|---|---|---|---|---|---|---|
| 1 | 1 | 3 | Jenna Strauch | Australia | 2:22.22 | Q |
| 2 | 1 | 4 | Lilly King | United States | 2:22.58 | Q |
| 3 | 2 | 5 | Kotryna Teterevkova | Lithuania | 2:23.66 | Q |
| 4 | 1 | 5 | Kate Douglass | United States | 2:23.79 | Q |
| 5 | 2 | 4 | Kelsey Wog | Canada | 2:23.82 | Q |
| 6 | 2 | 3 | Molly Renshaw | Great Britain | 2:24.06 | Q |
| 7 | 2 | 2 | Abbie Wood | Great Britain | 2:24.46 | Q |
| 8 | 2 | 6 | Francesca Fangio | Italy | 2:25.09 | Q |
| 9 | 1 | 6 | Sophie Hansson | Sweden | 2:25.12 | |
| 10 | 1 | 7 | Lisa Mamié | Switzerland | 2:25.56 | |
| 11 | 1 | 2 | Yu Jingyao | China | 2:26.10 | |
| 12 | 2 | 7 | Tes Schouten | Netherlands | 2:26.25 | |
| 13 | 2 | 1 | Abbey Harkin | Australia | 2:26.28 | |
| 14 | 2 | 8 | Moon Su-a | South Korea | 2:26.64 | |
| 15 | 1 | 1 | Kristýna Horská | Czech Republic | 2:27.87 | |
| 16 | 1 | 8 | Eszter Békési | Hungary | 2:28.17 | |

=== Final ===
The final was held on 23 June at 18:52.

| Rank | Lane | Name | Nationality | Time | Notes |
|---|---|---|---|---|---|
| 1st place, gold medalist(s) | 5 | Lilly King | United States | 2:22.41 | |
| 2nd place, silver medalist(s) | 4 | Jenna Strauch | Australia | 2:23.04 | |
| 3rd place, bronze medalist(s) | 6 | Kate Douglass | United States | 2:23.20 | |
| 4 | 2 | Kelsey Wog | Canada | 2:23.86 | |
| 5 | 3 | Kotryna Teterevkova | Lithuania | 2:23.90 | |
| 6 | 7 | Molly Renshaw | Great Britain | 2:23.92 | |
| 7 | 8 | Francesca Fangio | Italy | 2:25.08 | |
| 8 | 1 | Abbie Wood | Great Britain | 2:26.19 | |
