= Swimming at the 2022 World Aquatics Championships – Women's 100 metre butterfly =

Women's 100 metre butterfly at the 2022 World Aquatics Championships
- Venue: Danube Arena
- Location: Budapest, Hungary
- Dates: 18 June 2022 (heats and semifinals); 19 June 2022 (final)
- Competitors: 31 from 29 nations
- Winning time: 55.64

Medalists
gold medal	Torri Huske	United States
silver medal	Marie Wattel	France
bronze medal	Zhang Yufei	China

The Women's 100 metre butterfly competition at the 2022 World Aquatics Championships was held on 18 and 19 June 2022.

== Records ==
Prior to the competition, the existing world and championship records were as follows.

World record	Sarah Sjöström (SWE)	55.48	Rio de Janeiro, Brazil	7 August 2016
Competition record	Sarah Sjöström (SWE)	55.53	Budapest, Hungary	24 July 2017

== Results ==
=== Heats ===
The heats were started on 18 June at 09:44.

Rank	Heat	Lane	Name	Nationality	Time	Notes
1	3	4	Torri Huske	United States	56.82	Q
2	2	4	Marie Wattel	France	57.21	Q
3	4	4	Zhang Yufei	China	57.37	Q
4	3	5	Claire Curzan	United States	57.48	Q
5	4	5	Louise Hansson	Sweden	57.53	Q
6	3	6	Farida Osman	Egypt	57.76	Q, AF
7	2	5	Brianna Throssell	Australia	57.85	Q
8	2	7	Giovanna Diamante	Brazil	57.87	Q
9	2	3	Elena Di Liddo	Italy	57.97	Q
10	4	6	Katerine Savard	Canada	58.22	Q
11	4	7	Angelina Köhler	Germany	58.44	Q
12	2	6	Rebecca Smith	Canada	58.65	Q
13	3	3	Lana Pudar	Bosnia and Herzegovina	58.90	Q
14	4	3	Anna Ntountounaki	Greece	59.13	Q
15	4	1	Quah Jing Wen	Singapore	59.29	Q
16	4	2	Laura Stephens	Great Britain	59.46	Q
17	3	1	María José Mata	Mexico	59.58	
18	4	8	Tamara Potocká	Slovakia	1:00.12	
19	3	8	Olivia Borg	Samoa	1:01.19	
20	2	1	Luana Alonso	Paraguay	1:01.25	
21	2	8	Jasmine Alkhaldi	Philippines	1:01.34	
22	2	0	Julimar Ávila	Honduras	1:02.20	
23	4	0	Lê Thị Mỹ Lệ	Vietnam	1:02.48	
24	3	0	Isabella Alas	El Salvador	1:02.83	
25	2	9	Lucero Mejía	Guatemala	1:04.98	
26	4	9	Lia Ana Lima	Angola	1:06.51	
27	3	9	Aniqah Gaffoor	Sri Lanka	1:07.79	
28	1	4	Hayley Hoy	Eswatini	1:10.15	
29	1	6	Mia Lee	Guam	1:13.32	
30	1	5	Charissa Panuve	Tonga	1:15.01	
31	1	3	Daniella Nafal	Palestine	1:18.67	
–	2	2	Kim Seo-yeong	South Korea	Did not start	
–	3	2	Maria Ugolkova	Switzerland	Did not start	
–	3	7	Dalma Sebestyén	Hungary	Did not start	

=== Semifinals ===
The heats were started on 18 June at 18:13.

Rank	Heat	Lane	Name	Nationality	Time	Notes
1	2	4	Torri Huske	United States	56.29	Q
2	1	4	Marie Wattel	France	56.80	Q
3	1	5	Claire Curzan	United States	56.93	Q
4	2	6	Brianna Throssell	Australia	56.96	Q
5	2	3	Louise Hansson	Sweden	56.97	Q
6	2	5	Zhang Yufei	China	57.03	Q
7	2	1	Lana Pudar	Bosnia and Herzegovina	57.67	Q
8	1	3	Farida Osman	Egypt	57.91	Q
9	1	1	Anna Ntountounaki	Greece	57.93	
10	1	6	Giovanna Diamante	Brazil	57.94	
11	1	2	Katerine Savard	Canada	57.98	
12	1	7	Rebecca Smith	Canada	58.15	
13	2	2	Elena Di Liddo	Italy	58.44	
14	2	7	Angelina Köhler	Germany	58.46	
15	1	8	Laura Stephens	Great Britain	58.71	
16	2	8	Quah Jing Wen	Singapore	59.42	

=== Final ===
The final was held on 19 June at 18:10.

Rank	Lane	Name	Nationality	Time	Notes
1st place, gold medalist(s)	4	Torri Huske	United States	55.64	NR
2nd place, silver medalist(s)	5	Marie Wattel	France	56.14	NR
3rd place, bronze medalist(s)	7	Zhang Yufei	China	56.41	
4	2	Louise Hansson	Sweden	56.48	
5	3	Claire Curzan	United States	56.74	
6	6	Brianna Throssell	Australia	56.98	
7	8	Farida Osman	Egypt	57.66	AF
8	1	Lana Pudar	Bosnia and Herzegovina	58.44	
