= Swimming at the 2022 World Aquatics Championships – Women's 200 metre individual medley =

Women's 200 metre individual medley at the 2022 World Aquatics Championships
- Venue: Danube Arena
- Location: Budapest, Hungary
- Dates: 18 June (heats and semifinals); 19 June (final)
- Competitors: 38 from 32 nations
- Winning time: 2:07.13

Medalists
gold medal	Alexandra Walsh	United States
silver medal	Kaylee McKeown	Australia
bronze medal	Leah Hayes	United States

The Women's 200 metre individual medley competition at the 2022 World Aquatics Championships was held on 18 and 19 June 2022.

== Records ==
Prior to the competition, the existing world and championship records were as follows.

World record	Katinka Hosszú (HUN)	2:06.12	Kazan, Russia	3 August 2015
Competition record	Katinka Hosszú (HUN)	2:06.12	Kazan, Russia	3 August 2015

== Results ==
=== Heats ===
The heats were started on 18 June at 09:00.

Rank	Heat	Lane	Name	Nationality	Time	Notes
1	4	4	Alexandra Walsh	United States	2:09.41	Q
2	2	3	Leah Hayes	United States	2:09.81	Q
3	3	3	Anastasia Gorbenko	Israel	2:10.23	Q
4	4	2	Mary-Sophie Harvey	Canada	2:10.38	Q
5	2	7	Marrit Steenbergen	Netherlands	2:10.60	Q
6	4	5	Abbie Wood	Great Britain	2:10.89	Q
7	3	4	Kaylee McKeown	Australia	2:11.17	Q
8	4	3	Rika Omoto	Japan	2:11.28	Q
9	3	6	Kim Seo-yeong	South Korea	2:11.29	Q
10	3	5	Sydney Pickrem	Canada	2:11.60	Q
11	2	5	Katinka Hosszú	Hungary	2:11.77	Q
12	2	4	Yui Ohashi	Japan	2:12.22	Q
13	4	6	Maria Ugolkova	Switzerland	2:12.27	Q
14	4	8	Ge Chutong	China	2:12.98	Q
15	3	2	Dalma Sebestyén	Hungary	2:13.13	Q
16	2	2	Ella Ramsay	Australia	2:13.20	Q
17	3	1	Lea Polonsky	Israel	2:13.26	
18	2	6	Cyrielle Duhamel	France	2:13.39	
19	2	0	Stephanie Balduccini	Brazil	2:14.61	
20	3	7	Kristýna Horská	Czech Republic	2:15.04	
21	3	8	Lena Kreundl	Austria	2:15.31	
22	4	7	Helena Gasson	New Zealand	2:15.95	
23	4	0	Letitia Sim	Singapore	2:16.30	
24	2	8	Chloe Cheng	Hong Kong	2:16.32	
25	1	5	Ieva Maļuka	Latvia	2:16.94	NR
26	3	9	Nikoleta Trniková	Slovakia	2:17.36	
27	3	0	Florencia Perotti	Argentina	2:17.71	
28	2	9	Nicole Frank	Uruguay	2:17.78	
29	2	1	Kristen Romano	Puerto Rico	2:18.89	
30	4	1	Diana Petkova	Bulgaria	2:19.40	
31	1	4	Melissa Rodríguez	Mexico	2:19.55	
32	4	9	Jinjutha Pholjamjumrus	Thailand	2:20.38	
33	1	3	Alondra Ortiz	Costa Rica	2:23.22	
34	1	8	Simone Kabbara	Lebanon	2:25.39	
35	1	6	Elizabeth Jiménez	Dominican Republic	2:26.64	
36	1	2	Zaylie Thompson	Bahamas	2:30.15	
37	1	1	Hayley Wong	Brunei	2:37.55	
38	1	7	Zaira Forson	Ghana	2:41.45	

=== Semifinals ===
The semifinals were started on 18 June at 19:04.

Rank	Heat	Lane	Name	Nationality	Time	Notes
1	2	4	Alexandra Walsh	United States	2:08.74	Q
2	1	4	Leah Hayes	United States	2:09.82	Q
3	2	6	Kaylee McKeown	Australia	2:10.17	Q
4	1	5	Mary-Sophie Harvey	Canada	2:10.22	Q
5	2	2	Kim Seo-yeong	South Korea	2:10.47	Q
6	2	5	Anastasia Gorbenko	Israel	2:10.54	Q
7	1	6	Rika Omoto	Japan	2:10.65	Q
8	2	7	Katinka Hosszú	Hungary	2:10.72	Q
9	2	1	Maria Ugolkova	Switzerland	2:11.06	
10	2	3	Marrit Steenbergen	Netherlands	2:11.20	
11	1	2	Sydney Pickrem	Canada	2:11.28	
12	1	3	Abbie Wood	Great Britain	2:11.31	
13	1	7	Yui Ohashi	Japan	2:12.05	
14	2	8	Dalma Sebestyén	Hungary	2:13.09	
15	1	8	Ella Ramsay	Australia	2:13.10	
16	1	1	Ge Chutong	China	2:14.06	

=== Final ===
The final was held on 19 June at 19:27.

Rank	Lane	Name	Nationality	Time	Notes
1st place, gold medalist(s)	4	Alexandra Walsh	United States	2:07.13	
2nd place, silver medalist(s)	3	Kaylee McKeown	Australia	2:08.57	
3rd place, bronze medalist(s)	5	Leah Hayes	United States	2:08.91	
4	1	Rika Omoto	Japan	2:10.01	
5	7	Anastasia Gorbenko	Israel	2:11.02	
6	2	Kim Seo-yeong	South Korea	2:11.30	
7	8	Katinka Hosszú	Hungary	2:11.37	
8	6	Mary-Sophie Harvey	Canada	2:12.77	
