= France at the 2022 World Aquatics Championships =

- Flag of France
- World Aquatics code: FRA
- National federation: French Swimming Federation

in Budapest, Hungary
- Competitors: 55 in 5 sports
- Medals Ranked 7th: Gold 2 Silver 7 Bronze 2 Total 11

World Aquatics Championships appearances
- 1973; 1975; 1978; 1982; 1986; 1991; 1994; 1998; 2001; 2003; 2005; 2007; 2009; 2011; 2013; 2015; 2017; 2019; 2022; 2023; 2024; 2025

France competed at the 2022 World Aquatics Championships in Budapest, Hungary from 18 June to 3 July.

== Medalists ==
| Medal | Name | Sport | Event | Date |
|---|---|---|---|---|
| Gold | Léon Marchand | Swimming | Men's 400 metre individual medley | 18 June |
| Gold | Léon Marchand | Swimming | Men's 200 metre individual medley | 22 June |
| Silver | Marie Wattel | Swimming | Women's 100 metre butterfly | 19 June |
| Silver | Léon Marchand | Swimming | Men's 200 metre butterfly | 21 June |
| Silver | Maxime Grousset | Swimming | Men's 100 metre freestyle | 22 June |
| Silver | Mélanie Henique | Swimming | Women's 50 metre butterfly | 24 June |
| Silver | Aurélie Muller | Open water swimming | Women's 5 km | 27 June |
| Silver | Jade Gillet; Alexis Jandard | Diving | Team event | 29 June |
| Silver | Axel Reymond | Open water swimming | Men's 25 km | 30 June |
| Bronze | Analia Pigrée | Swimming | Women's 50 metre backstroke | 22 June |
| Bronze | Maxime Grousset | Swimming | Men's 50 metre freestyle | 24 June |

== Artistic swimming ==
France entered 10 artistic swimmers.

Women

| Athlete | Event | Preliminaries | | Final | |
| Athlete | Event | Points | Rank | Points | Rank |
|---|---|---|---|---|---|
| Oriane Jaillardon | Solo technical routine | 83.6928 | 8 Q | 83.6865 | 9 |
| Eve Planeix | Solo free routine | 87.1667 | 8 Q | 87.4667 | 8 |
| Ambre Esnault; Laura González; Mayssa Guermoud; Oriane Jaillardon; Maureen Jenkins; Romane Lune; Eve Planeix; Charlotte Tremble | Team technical routine | 86.4984 | 4 Q | 88.3558 | 4 |
| Camille Bravard; Ambre Esnault; Laura González; Mayssa Guermoud; Maureen Jenkins; Eve Planeix; Charlotte Tremble; Mathilde Vigneres | Team free routine | 89.1000 | 6 Q | 90.2667 | 6 |

== Diving ==
France entered 5 divers.

Men

| Athlete | Event | Preliminaries | | Semifinals | | Final | |
| Athlete | Event | Points | Rank | Points | Rank | Points | Rank |
|---|---|---|---|---|---|---|---|
| Jules Bouyer | 1 m springboard | 364.50 | 8 Q | —N/a | | 381.30 | 4 |
| Jules Bouyer | 3 m springboard | 384.75 | 12 Q | 406.90 | 6 Q | 421.70 | 7 |
| Alexis Jandard | 1 m springboard | 352.05 | 14 | —N/a | | did not advance | |
| Alexis Jandard | 3 m springboard | 401.60 | 6 Q | 394.40 | 8 Q | 427.50 | 5 |
| Jules Bouyer; Alexis Jandard | Synchronized 3 m springboard | 387.27 | 3 Q | —N/a | | 375.54 | 5 |

Women

| Athlete | Event | Preliminaries | | Semifinals | | Final | |
| Athlete | Event | Points | Rank | Points | Rank | Points | Rank |
|---|---|---|---|---|---|---|---|
| Nais Gilles | 1 m springboard | 213.40 | 30 | —N/a | | did not advance | |
| Jade Gillet | 10 m platform | 231.15 | 25 | did not advance | | | |
| Jade Gillet; Nais Gilles | Synchronized 3 m springboard | 198.30 | 12 Q | —N/a | | 228.45 | 12 |

Mixed

| Athlete | Event | Preliminaries | | Final | |
| Athlete | Event | Points | Rank | Points | Rank |
|---|---|---|---|---|---|
| Jade Gillet; Alexis Jandard | Team event | —N/a | | 358.50 | 2nd place, silver medalist(s) |
| Jules Bouyer; Nais Gilles | Synchronized 3 m springboard | —N/a | | 243.51 | 11 |
| Gary Hunt; Jade Gillet | Synchronized 10 m platform | —N/a | | 246.39 | 8 |

== Open water swimming ==
France entered 7 open water swimmers ( 4 male and 3 female)

Men

| Athlete | Event | Time | Rank |
|---|---|---|---|
| Logan Fontaine | 5 km | 53:43.2 | 6 |
| Marc-Antoine Olivier | 5 km | 53:26.0 | 5 |
| Marc-Antoine Olivier | 10 km | 1:51:11.5 | 4 |
| Axel Reymond | 25 km | 5:02:22.7 | 2nd place, silver medalist(s) |
| Sacha Velly | 10 km | 1:54:34.0 | 19 |
| Sacha Velly | 25 km | 5:20:42.3 | 19 |

Women

| Athlete | Event | Time | Rank |
|---|---|---|---|
| Caroline Jouisse | 10 km | 2:07:07.0 | 31 |
| Caroline Jouisse | 25 km | 5:25:32.1 | 5 |
| Aurélie Muller | 5 km | 57:53.8 | 2nd place, silver medalist(s) |
| Aurélie Muller | 10 km | 2:02:36.1 | 4 |
| Lisa Pou | 25 km | Did not start | |

Mixed

| Athlete | Event | Time | Rank |
|---|---|---|---|
| Caroline Jouisse; Aurélie Muller; Sacha Velly; Marc-Antoine Olivier | Team | 1:04:56.4 | 4 |

== Swimming ==
France entered 21 swimmers.

Men

| Athlete | Event | Heat | | Semifinal | | Final | |
| Athlete | Event | Time | Rank | Time | Rank | Time | Rank |
|---|---|---|---|---|---|---|---|
| Carl Aitkaci | 100 m breaststroke | 1:01.51 | 26 | did not advance | | | |
| Maxime Grousset | 50 m freestyle | 21.97 | 10 Q | 21.83; S/off 21.59 | 8 QSO; S/off Q | 21.57 | 3rd place, bronze medalist(s) |
| Maxime Grousset | 100 m freestyle | 48.17 | 5 Q | 47.54 | 2 Q | 47.64 | 2nd place, silver medalist(s) |
| Maxime Grousset | 50 m butterfly | 23.07 | 6 Q | 23.10 | 9 | did not advance | |
| Damien Joly | 800 m freestyle | 7:47.46 | 8 Q | —N/a | | 7:48.10 | 7 |
| Damien Joly | 1500 m freestyle | 14:53.47 | 5 Q | —N/a | | 15:09.15 | 8 |
| Florent Manaudou | 50 m freestyle | 22.04 | 13 Q | 21.95 | 11 | did not advance | |
| Florent Manaudou | 50 m butterfly | 23.31 | 10 Q | 23.23 | 12 | did not advance | |
| Léon Marchand | 200 m butterfly | 1:56.38 | 11 Q | 1:54.32 NR | 4 Q | 1:53.37 NR | 2nd place, silver medalist(s) |
| Léon Marchand | 200 m individual medley | 1:58.70 | 8 Q | 1:55.75 NR | 1 Q | 1:55.22 NR | 1st place, gold medalist(s) |
| Léon Marchand | 400 m individual medley | 4:09.09 NR | 1 Q | —N/a | | 4:04.28 CR, ER | 1st place, gold medalist(s) |
| Émilien Mattenet | 100 m breaststroke | 4:19.74 | 17 | did not advance | | | |
| Yohann Ndoye-Brouard | 50 m backstroke | 25.16 | 16 Q | 24.79 | 9 | did not advance | |
| Yohann Ndoye-Brouard | 100 m backstroke | 53.22 | 4 Q | 52.72 | 5 Q | 52.50 | 4 |
| Yohann Ndoye-Brouard | 200 m backstroke | 1:58.10 | 10 Q | 1:57.38 | 10 | did not advance | |
| Jordan Pothain | 200 m freestyle | 1:47.51 | 16 Q | 1:47.66 | 15 | did not advance | |
| Hadrien Salvan | 100 m freestyle | 49.01 | 27 | did not advance | | | |
| Hadrien Salvan | 200 m freestyle | 1:47.71 | 19 | did not advance | | | |
| Clément Secchi | 100 m butterfly | 52.76 | 23 | did not advance | | | |
| Enzo Tesic | 200 m individual medley | 1:59.71 | 19 | did not advance | | | |
| Mewen Tomac | 50 m backstroke | 25.01 | 10 Q | 24.91 | 13 | did not advance | |
| Mewen Tomac | 100 m backstroke | 53.60 | 8 Q | 53.41 | 9 | did not advance | |
| Mewen Tomac | 200 m backstroke | 1:57.21 | 5 Q | 1:56.52 | 4 Q | 1:56.35 | 5 |
| Antoine Viquerat | 50 m breaststroke | 27.68 | 17 | did not advance | | | |
| Antoine Viquerat | 200 m breaststroke | 2:12.27 | 18 | did not advance | | | |
| Jordan Pothain; Léon Marchand; Roman Fuchs; Hadrien Salvan; Enzo Tesic* | 4 × 200 m freestyle relay | 7:09.95 | 7 Q | —N/a | | 7:08.78 | 7 |
| Yohann Ndoye Brouard; Antoine Viquerat; Léon Marchand; Maxime Grousset | 4 × 100 m medley relay | 3:32.98 | 2 Q | —N/a | | 3:32.37 | 5 |

Women

| Athlete | Event | Heat | | Semifinal | | Final | |
| Athlete | Event | Time | Rank | Time | Rank | Time | Rank |
|---|---|---|---|---|---|---|---|
| Adèle Blanchetière | 100 m breaststroke | 1:09.68 | 30 | did not advance | | | |
| Charlotte Bonnet | 100 m freestyle | 54.37 | 13 Q | 54.73 | 16 | did not advance | |
| Charlotte Bonnet | 200 m freestyle | 1:58.14 | 10 Q | 1:56.54 | 4 Q | 1:57.24 | 6 |
| Cyrielle Duhamel | 200 m individual medley | 2:13.39 | 18 | did not advance | | | |
| Cyrielle Duhamel | 400 m individual medley | 4:52.24 | 13 | —N/a | | did not advance | |
| Mélanie Henique | 50 m butterfly | 25.61 | 3 Q | 25.41 | 3 Q | 25.31 | 2nd place, silver medalist(s) |
| Analia Pigrée | 50 m backstroke | 27.75 | 5 Q | 27.29 NR | 2 Q | 27.40 | 3rd place, bronze medalist(s) |
| Analia Pigrée | 100 m backstroke | 1:01.13 | 16 Q | 1:01.59 | 16 | did not advance | |
| Emma Terebo | 100 m backstroke | 59.87 | 6 Q | 1:00.06 | 8 Q | 59.98 | 5 |
| Emma Terebo | 200 m backstroke | 2:11.17 | 8 Q | 2:11.77 | 12 | did not advance | |
| Marie Wattel | 50 m freestyle | 25.34 | 16 Q | 25.04 | 12 | did not advance | |
| Marie Wattel | 100 m freestyle | 54.25 | 9 Q | 53.82 | 8 Q | 53.60 | 7 |
| Marie Wattel | 50 m butterfly | 26.01 | 8 Q | 25.56 | 6 Q | 25.79 | 7 |
| Marie Wattel | 100 m butterfly | 57.21 | 2 Q | 56.80 | 2 Q | 56.14 NR | 2nd place, silver medalist(s) |
| Emma Terebo; Adèle Blanchetière; Marie Wattel; Charlotte Bonnet | 4 × 100 m medley relay | 4:01.45 | 8 Q | —N/a | | 3:59.94 | 8 |

Legend: (*) = Swimmers who participated in the heat only.

== Water polo ==
Summary

| Team | Event | Group stage | | | | Playoff | Quarterfinal | Semifinal | Final / BM | |
| Team | Event | Opposition Score | Opposition Score | Opposition Score | Rank | Opposition Score | Opposition Score | Opposition Score | Opposition Score | Rank |
|---|---|---|---|---|---|---|---|---|---|---|
| France | Women's tournament | Spain; L 8–18 | Thailand; W 24–8 | Greece; L 4–15 | 3 | New Zealand; W 14–13 | Italy; L 7–17 | Spain; L 5–18 | Greece; L 7–16 | 8 |

=== Women's tournament ===
Team roster

The following is French roster in the Water polo at the 2022 World Aquatics Championships – Women's tournament.

Head coach: Émilien Bugeaud

- 1 Chloé Vidal GK
- 2 Estelle Millot D
- 3 Gabrielle Fitaire CB
- 4 Camelia Bouloukbachi FP
- 5 Louise Guillet D
- 6 Kahena Benlekbir D
- 7 Juliette Dhalluin D
- 8 Aurelie Battu CF
- 9 Ema Vernoux FP
- 10 Viviane Bahia FP
- 11 Camille Radosavljevic FP
- 12 Audrey Daule D
- 13 Anne Collas GK

Group play

| Pos | Team | Pld | W | D | L | GF | GA | GD | Pts | Qualification |
|---|---|---|---|---|---|---|---|---|---|---|
| 1 | Greece | 3 | 2 | 1 | 0 | 53 | 15 | +38 | 5 (Note: Spain 10–10 Greece) | Quarterfinals |
| 2 | Spain | 3 | 2 | 1 | 0 | 58 | 20 | +38 | 5 | Playoffs |
| 3 | France | 3 | 1 | 0 | 2 | 36 | 41 | −5 | 2 | Playoffs |
| 4 | Thailand | 3 | 0 | 0 | 3 | 11 | 82 | −71 | 0 | |

Source: Sportresult
Rules for classification: 1) points; 2) head-to-head points; 3) head-to-head goal difference; 4) head-to-head number of goals scored; 5) Goal difference.
Notes:

| 20 June 2022; 19:30 | Report | France | 8–18 | Spain | Szeged Tiszavirag Pool, Szeged; Referees: Levan Berishvili (GEO), Raffaele Colombo (ITA) |
| 20 June 2022; 19:30 | Report | Score by quarters: 1–4, 3–3, 2–5, 2–6 | | | Szeged Tiszavirag Pool, Szeged; Referees: Levan Berishvili (GEO), Raffaele Colombo (ITA) |
| 20 June 2022; 19:30 | Report | Vernoux 4 | Goals | Forca 5 | Szeged Tiszavirag Pool, Szeged; Referees: Levan Berishvili (GEO), Raffaele Colombo (ITA) |

| 22 June 2022; 19:30 | Report | Thailand | 8–24 | France | Szeged Tiszavirag Pool, Szeged; Referees: Hélène Painchaud (CAN), Fabio Toffoli (BRA) |
| 22 June 2022; 19:30 | Report | Score by quarters: 2–6, 2–7, 0–7, 4–4 | | | Szeged Tiszavirag Pool, Szeged; Referees: Hélène Painchaud (CAN), Fabio Toffoli (BRA) |
| 22 June 2022; 19:30 | Report | Puangtong 4 | Goals | Guillet 6 | Szeged Tiszavirag Pool, Szeged; Referees: Hélène Painchaud (CAN), Fabio Toffoli (BRA) |

| 24 June 2022; 19:30 | Report | France | 4–15 | Greece | Szeged Tiszavirag Pool, Szeged; Referees: Hélène Painchaud (CAN), Raffaele Colombo (ITA) |
| 24 June 2022; 19:30 | Report | Score by quarters: 1–4, 1–4, 1–3, 1–4 | | | Szeged Tiszavirag Pool, Szeged; Referees: Hélène Painchaud (CAN), Raffaele Colombo (ITA) |
| 24 June 2022; 19:30 | Report | Bouloukbachi 2 | Goals | three players 3 | Szeged Tiszavirag Pool, Szeged; Referees: Hélène Painchaud (CAN), Raffaele Colombo (ITA) |

Playoffs

| 26 June 2022; 15:30 | Report | New Zealand | 13–14 (PSO) | France | Alfréd Hajós National Swimming Stadium, Budapest; Referees: Georgios Stavridis (GRE), Adil Aimbetov (KAZ) |
| 26 June 2022; 15:30 | Report | Score by quarters: 2–1, 3–3, 2–3, 2–2 PSO: 4–5 | | | Alfréd Hajós National Swimming Stadium, Budapest; Referees: Georgios Stavridis (GRE), Adil Aimbetov (KAZ) |
| 26 June 2022; 15:30 | Report | McDowall 5 | Goals | Dhalluin 4 | Alfréd Hajós National Swimming Stadium, Budapest; Referees: Georgios Stavridis (GRE), Adil Aimbetov (KAZ) |

Quarterfinals

| 28 June 2022; 13:00 | Report | Italy | 17–7 | France | Alfréd Hajós National Swimming Stadium, Budapest; Referees: Helene Painchaud (CAN), Maro Savinović (CRO) |
| 28 June 2022; 13:00 | Report | Score by quarters: 3–2, 4–1, 6–1, 4–3 | | | Alfréd Hajós National Swimming Stadium, Budapest; Referees: Helene Painchaud (CAN), Maro Savinović (CRO) |
| 28 June 2022; 13:00 | Report | Giustini 6 | Goals | Guillet 4 | Alfréd Hajós National Swimming Stadium, Budapest; Referees: Helene Painchaud (CAN), Maro Savinović (CRO) |

5–8th place semifinals

| 30 June 2022; 14:30 | Report | France | 5–18 | Spain | Alfréd Hajós National Swimming Stadium, Budapest; Referees: Adil Aimbetov (KAZ), Dion Willis (RSA) |
| 30 June 2022; 14:30 | Report | Score by quarters: 1–3, 2–3, 1–5, 1–7 | | | Alfréd Hajós National Swimming Stadium, Budapest; Referees: Adil Aimbetov (KAZ), Dion Willis (RSA) |
| 30 June 2022; 14:30 | Report | five players 1 | Goals | four players 3 | Alfréd Hajós National Swimming Stadium, Budapest; Referees: Adil Aimbetov (KAZ), Dion Willis (RSA) |

Seventh place game

| 2 July 2022; 13:00 | Report | France | 7–16 | Greece | Alfréd Hajós National Swimming Stadium, Budapest; Referees: Veselin Mišković (MNE), Dion Willis (RSA) |
| 2 July 2022; 13:00 | Report | Score by quarters: 2–5, 1–3, 2–5, 2–3 | | | Alfréd Hajós National Swimming Stadium, Budapest; Referees: Veselin Mišković (MNE), Dion Willis (RSA) |
| 2 July 2022; 13:00 | Report | Millot 3 | Goals | Myriokefalitaki 5 | Alfréd Hajós National Swimming Stadium, Budapest; Referees: Veselin Mišković (MNE), Dion Willis (RSA) |
