= Swimming at the 2022 World Aquatics Championships – Men's 50 metre butterfly =

Men's 50 metre butterfly at the 2022 World Aquatics Championships
- Venue: Danube Arena
- Location: Budapest, Hungary
- Dates: 18 June (heats and semifinals); 19 June (final)
- Competitors: 71 from 63 nations
- Winning time: 22.57

Medalists
gold medal	Caeleb Dressel	United States
silver medal	Nicholas Santos	Brazil
bronze medal	Michael Andrew	United States

The Men's 50 metre butterfly competition at the 2022 World Aquatics Championships was held on 18 and 19 June 2022.

== Records ==
Prior to the competition, the existing world and championship records were as follows.

World record	Andriy Govorov (UKR)	22.27	Rome, Italy	1 July 2018
Competition record	Caeleb Dressel (USA)	22.35	Gwangju, South Korea	22 July 2019

== Results ==
=== Heats ===
The heats were started on 18 June at 09:55.

Rank	Heat	Lane	Name	Nationality	Time	Notes
1	5	8	Dylan Carter	Trinidad and Tobago	22.87	Q, NR
2	7	4	Caeleb Dressel	United States	22.88	Q
2	8	6	Thomas Ceccon	Italy	22.88	Q, NR
4	6	4	Michael Andrew	United States	22.89	Q
5	7	1	Noè Ponti	Switzerland	23.04	Q, NR
6	6	6	Maxime Grousset	France	23.07	Q
7	7	3	Ben Proud	Great Britain	23.08	Q
8	8	5	Szebasztián Szabó	Hungary	23.11	Q
9	6	5	Nyls Korstanje	Netherlands	23.27	Q
10	8	2	Florent Manaudou	France	23.31	Q
11	7	5	Andriy Govorov	Ukraine	23.34	Q
12	8	1	Daniel Zaitsev	Estonia	23.38	Q
13	8	4	Nicholas Santos	Brazil	23.46	Q
14	6	0	Simon Bucher	Austria	23.51	Q, NR
14	8	3	Teong Tzen Wei	Singapore	23.51	Q
16	6	3	Konrad Czerniak	Poland	23.53	QSO
16	6	7	Piero Codia	Italy	23.53	QSO
18	6	1	Rasmus Nickelsen	Denmark	23.54	
19	8	8	Meiron Cheruti	Israel	23.58	
20	6	2	Naoki Mizunuma	Japan	23.60	
21	7	8	Jacob Peters	Great Britain	23.62	
21	8	7	Nicholas Lia	Norway	23.62	
23	7	6	Abdelrahman Sameh	Egypt	23.64	
23	7	7	Thomas Verhoeven	Netherlands	23.64	
25	6	8	Vladyslav Bukhov	Ukraine	23.66	
26	5	6	Julien Henx	Luxembourg	23.69	
26	7	9	Adilbek Mussin	Kazakhstan	23.69	
28	5	5	Stergios Bilas	Greece	23.72	
28	8	9	Alberto Lozano	Spain	23.72	
30	7	0	Oskar Hoff	Sweden	23.73	
31	7	2	Paweł Smoliński	Poland	23.78	
32	5	3	Sun Jiajun	China	23.83	
33	6	9	Chad le Clos	South Africa	23.86	
34	4	6	Ádám Halás	Slovakia	23.94	NR
35	5	4	Cameron Gray	New Zealand	24.01	
36	5	1	Kim Ji-hun	South Korea	24.02	
37	5	7	Abeiku Jackson	Ghana	24.11	
38	5	2	Jorge Iga	Mexico	24.13	
38	4	5	Ian Ho	Hong Kong	24.13	
40	4	8	Emre Sakçı	Turkey	24.16	
41	8	0	Vinicius Lanza	Brazil	24.26	
42	4	4	Waleed Abdulrazzaq	Kuwait	24.32	
43	4	7	Bernat Lomero	Andorra	24.34	
44	5	0	Ben Hockin	Paraguay	24.38	
45	4	3	Guido Buscaglia	Argentina	24.39	
46	5	9	Glenn Victor Sutanto	Indonesia	24.60	
47	3	3	Colins Ebingha	Nigeria	24.61	
48	4	2	Mehrshad Afghari	Iran	24.77	
49	4	1	Jayhan Odlum-Smith	Saint Lucia	24.81	
50	4	0	Matthew Lawrence	Mozambique	24.97	
51	3	4	Ayman Klzie	Syria	25.04	NR
51	3	5	Salvador Gordo	Angola	25.04	NR
53	3	2	Mohamad Masoud	FINA Refugee Team	25.27	
54	1	3	Khurshidjon Tursunov	Uzbekistan	25.44	
55	3	6	Jesse Washington	Bermuda	25.59	
56	1	7	Jeno Heyns	Suriname	25.63	
57	4	9	Souhail Hamouchane	Morocco	26.11	
58	1	6	Musa Zhalayev	Turkmenistan	26.21	
59	2	7	Mahmoud Abu Gharbieh	Palestine	26.89	
60	3	7	Isihaka Irankunda	Rwanda	27.07	
61	2	8	Fakhriddin Madkamov	Tajikistan	27.24	
62	3	1	Troy Pina	Cape Verde	27.33	
63	2	6	Abdulhai Ashour	Libya	27.50	
64	2	0	Taiyo Akimaru	Northern Mariana Islands	27.85	
65	2	4	Elhadj Diallo	Guinea	29.06	
66	3	9	Fahim Anwari	Afghanistan	29.24	
67	3	0	Simanga Dlamini	Eswatini	29.25	
68	2	5	Houmed Houssein	Djibouti	29.57	
69	1	5	Tilahun Malede	Ethiopia	30.50	
70	1	4	Basem Rashed	Yemen	33.76	
–	1	2	Charly Ndjoume	Cameroon	Did not start	
–	2	1	Diosdado Miko Eyanga	Equatorial Guinea	Did not start	
–	2	2	Hasan Al-Zinkee	Iraq	Did not start	
–	2	9	Pap Jonga	Gambia	Did not start	
–	3	8	Souleymane Napare	Burkina Faso	Did not start	
–	2	3	Refiloe Chopho	Lesotho	Disqualified	

=== Swim-off ===
The swim-off was held on 18 June at 11:39.

Rank	Lane	Name	Nationality	Time	Notes
1	4	Konrad Czerniak	Poland	23.38	Q
2	5	Piero Codia	Italy	23.40	

=== Semifinals ===
The heats were started on 18 June at 18:24.

Rank	Heat	Lane	Name	Nationality	Time	Notes
1	2	6	Ben Proud	Great Britain	22.76	Q
2	1	4	Caeleb Dressel	United States	22.79	Q
2	2	5	Thomas Ceccon	Italy	22.79	Q, NR
4	1	5	Michael Andrew	United States	22.87	Q
5	1	6	Szebasztián Szabó	Hungary	22.91	Q
6	2	4	Dylan Carter	Trinidad and Tobago	22.98	Q
7	2	8	Teong Tzen Wei	Singapore	23.03	Q
8	2	1	Nicholas Santos	Brazil	23.04	Q
9	1	3	Maxime Grousset	France	23.10	
10	2	2	Nyls Korstanje	Netherlands	23.14	
11	1	1	Simon Bucher	Austria	23.18	NR
12	1	2	Florent Manaudou	France	23.23	
13	2	3	Noè Ponti	Switzerland	23.29	
14	2	7	Andriy Govorov	Ukraine	23.31	
15	1	7	Daniel Zaitsev	Estonia	23.38	
16	1	8	Konrad Czerniak	Poland	23.50	

=== Final ===
The final was held on 19 June at 18:48.

Rank	Lane	Name	Nationality	Time	Notes
1st place, gold medalist(s)	5	Caeleb Dressel	United States	22.57	
2nd place, silver medalist(s)	8	Nicholas Santos	Brazil	22.78	
3rd place, bronze medalist(s)	6	Michael Andrew	United States	22.79	
4	7	Dylan Carter	Trinidad and Tobago	22.85	NR
5	3	Thomas Ceccon	Italy	22.86	
6	2	Szebasztián Szabó	Hungary	23.01	
7	4	Ben Proud	Great Britain	23.08	
8	1	Teong Tzen Wei	Singapore	23.29	
