= Swimming at the 2022 World Aquatics Championships – Men's 400 metre individual medley =

Men's 400 metre individual medley at the 2022 World Aquatics Championships
- Venue: Danube Arena
- Location: Budapest, Hungary
- Dates: 18 June (heats and final)
- Competitors: 30 from 25 nations
- Winning time: 4:04.28

Medalists
| gold medal | Léon Marchand | France |
| silver medal | Carson Foster | United States |
| bronze medal | Chase Kalisz | United States |

The Men's 400 metre individual medley competition at the 2022 World Aquatics Championships was held on 18 June 2022.

== Records ==
Prior to the competition, the existing world and championship records were as follows.

| World record | Michael Phelps (USA) | 4:03.84 | Beijing, China | 10 August 2008 |
| Competition record | Chase Kalisz (USA) | 4:05.90 | Budapest, Hungary | 30 July 2017 |

The following record was established during the competition:

| Date | Event | Name | Nationality | Time | Record |
|---|---|---|---|---|---|
| 18 June | Final | Léon Marchand | France | 4:04.28 | CR |

== Results ==
=== Heats ===
The heats were started at 10:54.

| Rank | Heat | Lane | Name | Nationality | Time | Notes |
|---|---|---|---|---|---|---|
| 1 | 3 | 3 | Léon Marchand | France | 4:09.09 | Q, NR |
| 2 | 3 | 5 | Carson Foster | United States | 4:09.60 | Q |
| 3 | 3 | 4 | Chase Kalisz | United States | 4:10.32 | Q |
| 4 | 4 | 4 | Daiya Seto | Japan | 4:10.51 | Q |
| 5 | 3 | 7 | Balázs Holló | Hungary | 4:10.87 | Q |
| 6 | 4 | 2 | Tomoru Honda | Japan | 4:12.24 | Q |
| 7 | 4 | 3 | Lewis Clareburt | New Zealand | 4:12.39 | Q |
| 8 | 4 | 5 | Brendon Smith | Australia | 4:12.50 | Q |
| 9 | 4 | 6 | Alberto Razzetti | Italy | 4:13.72 | |
| 10 | 4 | 7 | Brodie Williams | Great Britain | 4:13.89 | |
| 11 | 2 | 3 | Matthew Sates | South Africa | 4:14.81 | |
| 12 | 4 | 1 | Hubert Kós | Hungary | 4:15.44 | |
| 13 | 3 | 1 | Se-Bom Lee | Australia | 4:16.40 | |
| 14 | 3 | 6 | Wang Shun | China | 4:17.85 | |
| 14 | 4 | 9 | Collyn Gagne | Canada | 4:17.85 | |
| 16 | 3 | 0 | Stephan Steverink | Brazil | 4:19.09 | |
| 17 | 4 | 0 | Émilien Mattenet | France | 4:19.74 | |
| 18 | 2 | 2 | Héctor Ruvalcaba | Mexico | 4:19.99 | |
| 19 | 4 | 8 | Liu Zongyu | China | 4:20.53 | |
| 20 | 2 | 5 | Richard Nagy | Slovakia | 4:20.78 | |
| 21 | 3 | 9 | Erick Gordillo | Guatemala | 4:22.96 | |
| 22 | 2 | 6 | Ron Polonsky | Israel | 4:24.05 | |
| 23 | 2 | 8 | Munzer Kabbara | Lebanon | 4:24.23 | NR |
| 24 | 3 | 2 | Apostolos Papastamos | Greece | 4:26.06 | |
| 25 | 2 | 4 | Kim Min-seop | South Korea | 4:28.35 | |
| 26 | 2 | 7 | Nguyễn Quang Thuấn | Vietnam | 4:29.73 | |
| 27 | 1 | 4 | Matheo Mateos | Paraguay | 4:30.20 | |
| 28 | 2 | 1 | Aflah Fadlan Prawira | Indonesia | 4:31.15 | |
| 29 | 1 | 5 | Omar Abouelela | Qatar | 4:43.16 | |
| 30 | 1 | 3 | Mubal Azzam Ibrahim | Maldives | 5:14.91 | |
| — | 3 | 8 | Jérémy Desplanches | Switzerland | DNS | |

=== Final ===
The final was held at 19:25.

| Rank | Lane | Name | Nationality | Time | Notes |
|---|---|---|---|---|---|
| 1st place, gold medalist(s) | 4 | Léon Marchand | France | 4:04.28 | CR, ER |
| 2nd place, silver medalist(s) | 5 | Carson Foster | United States | 4:06.56 | |
| 3rd place, bronze medalist(s) | 3 | Chase Kalisz | United States | 4:07.47 | |
| 4 | 1 | Lewis Clareburt | New Zealand | 4:10.98 | |
| 5 | 8 | Brendon Smith | Australia | 4:11.36 | |
| 6 | 6 | Daiya Seto | Japan | 4:11.93 | |
| 7 | 7 | Tomoru Honda | Japan | 4:12.20 | |
| 8 | 2 | Balázs Holló | Hungary | 4:15.17 | |
