= Swimming at the 2022 World Aquatics Championships – Women's 100 metre freestyle =

Women's 100 metre freestyle at the 2022 World Aquatics Championships
- Venue: Danube Arena
- Location: Budapest, Hungary
- Dates: 22 June (heats and semifinals); 23 June (final)
- Competitors: 63 from 58 nations
- Winning time: 52.67

Medalists
gold medal	Mollie O'Callaghan	Australia
silver medal	Sarah Sjöström	Sweden
bronze medal	Torri Huske	United States

The Women's 100 metre freestyle competition at the 2022 World Aquatics Championships was held on 22 and 23 June 2022.

== Records ==
Prior to the competition, the existing world and championship records were as follows.

World record	Sarah Sjöström (SWE)	51.71	Budapest, Hungary	23 July 2017
Competition record	Sarah Sjöström (SWE)	51.71	Budapest, Hungary	23 July 2017

== Results ==
=== Heats ===
The heats were started on 22 June at 09:00.

Rank	Heat	Lane	Name	Nationality	Time	Notes
1	6	4	Mollie O'Callaghan	Australia	53.49	Q
2	5	4	Penny Oleksiak	Canada	53.70	Q
3	7	6	Torri Huske	United States	53.72	Q
4	6	5	Sarah Sjöström	Sweden	53.78	Q
5	6	3	Kayla Sanchez	Canada	54.06	Q
6	5	5	Anna Hopkin	Great Britain	54.08	Q
7	7	7	Marrit Steenbergen	Netherlands	54.13	Q
8	7	3	Yang Junxuan	China	54.18	Q, WD
9	5	3	Marie Wattel	France	54.25	Q
9	7	1	Kalia Antoniou	Cyprus	54.25	Q, NR
11	5	2	Cheng Yujie	China	54.28	Q
11	7	2	Claire Curzan	United States	54.28	Q
13	6	2	Charlotte Bonnet	France	54.37	Q
14	6	6	Freya Anderson	Great Britain	54.40	Q
15	5	7	Stephanie Balduccini	Brazil	54.48	Q
16	6	7	Janja Šegel	Slovenia	54.56	Q
17	5	6	Signe Bro	Denmark	54.61	Q
18	6	1	Maria Ugolkova	Switzerland	54.78	
19	6	8	Fanni Gyurinovics	Hungary	54.97	
20	7	8	Valentine Dumont	Belgium	55.14	
21	5	1	Chiara Tarantino	Italy	55.30	
22	5	8	Emma Chelius	South Africa	55.39	
23	7	0	Hur Yeon-kyung	South Korea	55.50	
24	7	9	Daria Golovaty	Israel	55.85	
25	5	9	Aleksa Gold	Estonia	56.19	
26	4	5	Snæfríður Jórunnardóttir	Iceland	56.31	
27	5	0	Anicka Delgado	Ecuador	56.43	
28	4	4	Ieva Maļuka	Latvia	56.46	
29	4	2	Jillian Crooks	Cayman Islands	57.24	
29	4	3	Rafaela Fernandini	Peru	57.24	
31	4	6	Miranda Renner	Philippines	57.80	
32	4	7	Kenisha Gupta	India	57.99	
33	2	1	Batbayaryn Enkhkhüslen	Mongolia	58.16	
34	4	8	Karen Torrez	Bolivia	58.96	
35	4	1	Isabella Alas	El Salvador	59.00	
36	4	9	Maxine Egner	Botswana	59.08	
37	4	0	Chloe Farro	Aruba	59.13	
38	3	5	Oumy Diop	Senegal	59.53	
39	1	7	Olivia Fuller	Antigua and Barbuda	1:00.42	
40	3	6	Cheyenne Rova	Fiji	1:00.75	
41	3	4	Lina Khiyara	Morocco	1:00.79	
42	3	3	Zaylie Thompson	Bahamas	1:01.04	
43	2	8	Tilly Collymore	Grenada	1:01.40	
44	3	0	Dorcas Oka	Nigeria	1:01.54	
45	3	7	Georgia-Leigh Vele	Papua New Guinea	1:01.73	
46	3	1	Nomvula Mjimba	Zimbabwe	1:02.20	
47	1	6	Anastasiya Morginshtern	Turkmenistan	1:02.43	
48	3	9	Khema Elizabeth	Seychelles	1:02.79	
49	3	8	Jamie Joachim	Saint Vincent and the Grenadines	1:03.14	
50	2	7	Avice Meya	Uganda	1:03.16	
51	2	9	Kaya Forson	Ghana	1:03.19	
52	1	3	Mia Lee	Guam	1:03.67	
53	1	5	Hana Beiqi	Kosovo	1:03.68	
54	3	2	Bisma Khan	Pakistan	1:03.72	
55	2	2	Makelyta Singsombath	Laos	1:05.26	
56	1	4	Ekaterina Bordachyova	Tajikistan	1:05.38	NR
57	2	4	Nafissath Radji	Benin	1:07.06	
58	1	8	Jinie Thompson	Northern Mariana Islands	1:10.31	
59	2	0	Yuri Hosei	Palau	1:11.34	
60	2	5	Alyse Maniriho	Burundi	1:12.38	
61	2	3	Tayamika Chang'anamuno	Malawi	1:14.96	
62	1	2	Kayla Temba	Tanzania	1:18.35	
63	2	6	Roukaya Mahamane	Niger	1:18.94	NR
	1	1	Mashael Al-Ayed	Saudi Arabia	Did not start	
	6	0	Laura Littlejohn	New Zealand	Did not start	
	6	9	Diana Petkova	Bulgaria	Did not start	
	7	4	Siobhán Haughey	Hong Kong	Did not start	
	7	5	Shayna Jack	Australia	Did not start	

=== Semifinals ===
The semifinals were started on 22 June at 18:11.

Rank	Heat	Lane	Name	Nationality	Time	Notes
1	2	4	Mollie O'Callaghan	Australia	52.85	Q
2	1	5	Sarah Sjöström	Sweden	53.02	Q
3	2	5	Torri Huske	United States	53.04	Q
4	1	4	Penny Oleksiak	Canada	53.18	Q
5	1	2	Cheng Yujie	China	53.36	Q
6	2	3	Kayla Sanchez	Canada	53.61	Q
7	2	7	Claire Curzan	United States	53.62	Q
8	1	6	Marie Wattel	France	53.82	Q
9	1	3	Anna Hopkin	Great Britain	53.92	
10	1	1	Stephanie Balduccini	Brazil	54.10	
11	2	6	Marrit Steenbergen	Netherlands	54.11	
12	2	1	Freya Anderson	Great Britain	54.19	
13	2	2	Kalia Antoniou	Cyprus	54.24	NR
14	2	8	Janja Šegel	Slovenia	54.36	
15	1	8	Signe Bro	Denmark	54.70	
16	1	7	Charlotte Bonnet	France	54.73	

=== Final ===
The final was held on 23 June at 18:02.

Rank	Lane	Name	Nationality	Time	Notes
1st place, gold medalist(s)	4	Mollie O'Callaghan	Australia	52.67	
2nd place, silver medalist(s)	5	Sarah Sjöström	Sweden	52.80	
3rd place, bronze medalist(s)	3	Torri Huske	United States	52.92	
4	6	Penny Oleksiak	Canada	52.98	
5	2	Cheng Yujie	China	53.58	
6	7	Kayla Sanchez	Canada	53.59	
7	8	Marie Wattel	France	53.60	
8	1	Claire Curzan	United States	53.81	
