= Swimming at the 2022 World Aquatics Championships – Men's 50 metre backstroke =

Men's 50 metre backstroke at the 2022 World Aquatics Championships
- Venue: Danube Arena
- Location: Budapest, Hungary
- Dates: 24 June (heats and semifinals); 25 June (final)
- Competitors: 49 from 43 nations
- Winning time: 24.12

Medalists
gold medal	Justin Ress	United States
silver medal	Hunter Armstrong	United States
bronze medal	Ksawery Masiuk	Poland

The Men's 50 metre backstroke competition at the 2022 World Aquatics Championships was held on 24 and 25 June 2022.

== Records ==
Prior to the competition, the existing world and championship records were as follows.

World record	Hunter Armstrong (USA)	23.71	Greensboro, United States	28 April 2022
Competition record	Liam Tancock (GBR)	24.04	Rome, Italy	2 August 2009

== Results ==
=== Heats ===
The heats were started on 24 June at 09:23.

Rank	Heat	Lane	Name	Nationality	Time	Notes
1	5	4	Justin Ress	United States	24.24	Q
2	6	3	Ole Braunschweig	Germany	24.58	Q, NR
3	6	1	Thomas Ceccon	Italy	24.62	Q, NR
4	6	4	Hunter Armstrong	United States	24.63	Q
5	4	3	Ksawery Masiuk	Poland	24.64	Q, NR
6	6	5	Isaac Cooper	Australia	24.67	Q
7	4	4	Robert Glință	Romania	24.79	Q
8	5	6	Ryosuke Irie	Japan	24.85	Q, WD
9	4	5	Apostolos Christou	Greece	24.88	Q
10	6	6	Mewen Tomac	France	25.01	Q
11	4	6	Andrew Jeffcoat	New Zealand	25.06	Q
12	5	7	Michael Laitarovsky	Israel	25.08	Q
13	4	7	Tomasz Polewka	Poland	25.10	Q
14	5	8	Xu Jiayu	China	25.12	Q
15	6	2	Guilherme Basseto	Brazil	25.15	Q
16	5	2	Michele Lamberti	Italy	25.16	Q
16	6	7	Yohann Ndoye Brouard	France	25.16	Q
18	3	3	Javier Acevedo	Canada	25.18	
19	5	5	Hugo González	Spain	25.26	
20	4	8	Lee Ju-ho	South Korea	25.31	
21	5	1	Richárd Bohus	Hungary	25.47	
21	5	3	Mitch Larkin	Australia	25.47	
23	5	9	Chuang Mu-lun	Chinese Taipei	25.55	
24	3	2	Ģirts Feldbergs	Latvia	25.62	
24	4	1	Bence Szentes	Hungary	25.62	
26	6	9	Quah Zheng Wen	Singapore	25.79	
27	6	8	Jan Čejka	Czech Republic	25.89	
28	4	0	Daniel Zaitsev	Estonia	26.01	
29	4	9	I Gede Siman Sudartawa	Indonesia	26.09	
30	3	1	Jack Kirby	Barbados	26.11	
31	6	0	Charles Hockin	Paraguay	26.17	
32	3	4	Max Mannes	Luxembourg	26.19	
33	5	0	Yeziel Morales	Puerto Rico	26.23	
34	3	5	Lau Shiu Yue	Hong Kong	26.41	
35	3	7	Elías Ardiles	Chile	26.71	
36	3	6	Filippos Iakovidis	Cyprus	26.91	
37	2	0	Ali Al-Essa	Saudi Arabia	27.26	
38	1	4	Omar Al-Rowaila	Bahrain	27.28	NR
39	3	0	Bede Aitu	Cook Islands	28.03	
40	1	3	Mekhayl Engel	Curaçao	28.10	
41	2	1	Juhn Tenorio	Northern Mariana Islands	28.18	
42	2	3	Samiul Islam Rafi	Bangladesh	28.22	
43	1	5	Jeno Heyns	Suriname	28.41	
44	3	8	Andrej Stojanovski	North Macedonia	28.43	
45	2	2	José Manuel Campo	El Salvador	28.45	
46	3	9	Rohan Shearer	Turks and Caicos Islands	28.89	
47	2	5	Mohamed Aan Hussain	Maldives	29.57	
48	2	4	Adnan Kabuye	Uganda	29.65	
49	2	7	Aseel Khousrof	Yemen	35.39	
	2	6	Faizan Akbar	Pakistan	Did not start	
	2	8	Hasan Al-Zinkee	Iraq	Did not start	
	4	2	Mohamed Samy	Egypt	Did not start	

=== Semifinals ===
The semifinals were started on 24 June at 19:09.

Rank	Heat	Lane	Name	Nationality	Time	Notes
1	2	4	Justin Ress	United States	24.14	Q
2	1	5	Hunter Armstrong	United States	24.16	Q
3	1	6	Apostolos Christou	Greece	24.39	Q, NR
4	2	5	Thomas Ceccon	Italy	24.46	Q, NR
5	2	3	Ksawery Masiuk	Poland	24.48	Q, NR
6	2	6	Robert Glință	Romania	24.54	Q
7	1	3	Isaac Cooper	Australia	24.60	Q
8	1	4	Ole Braunschweig	Germany	24.61	Q
9	1	8	Yohann Ndoye Brouard	France	24.79	
10	1	1	Guilherme Basseto	Brazil	24.85	
11	2	8	Michele Lamberti	Italy	24.86	
12	2	1	Xu Jiayu	China	24.90	
13	1	2	Andrew Jeffcoat	New Zealand	24.91	
13	2	2	Mewen Tomac	France	24.91	
15	2	7	Michael Laitarovsky	Israel	25.11	
16	1	7	Tomasz Polewka	Poland	25.28	

=== Final ===
The final was held on 25 June at 18:02.

Rank	Lane	Name	Nationality	Time	Notes
1st place, gold medalist(s)	4	Justin Ress	United States	24.12	
2nd place, silver medalist(s)	5	Hunter Armstrong	United States	24.14	
3rd place, bronze medalist(s)	2	Ksawery Masiuk	Poland	24.49	
4	6	Thomas Ceccon	Italy	24.51	
5	3	Apostolos Christou	Greece	24.57	
5	7	Robert Glință	Romania	24.57	
7	8	Ole Braunschweig	Germany	24.66	
8	1	Isaac Cooper	Australia	24.76	
