= Swimming at the 2022 World Aquatics Championships – Women's 400 metre individual medley =

Women's 400 metre individual medley at the 2022 World Aquatics Championships
- Venue: Danube Arena
- Location: Budapest, Hungary
- Dates: 25 June (heats and final)
- Competitors: 19 from 15 nations
- Winning time: 4:32.04

Medalists
| gold medal | Summer McIntosh | Canada |
| silver medal | Katie Grimes | United States |
| bronze medal | Emma Weyant | United States |

The Women's 400 metre individual medley competition at the 2022 World Aquatics Championships was held on 25 June 2022.

== Records ==
Prior to the competition, the existing world and championship records were as follows.

| World record | Katinka Hosszú (HUN) | 4:26.36 | Rio de Janeiro, Brazil | 6 August 2016 |
| Competition record | Katinka Hosszú (HUN) | 4:29.33 | Budapest, Hungary | 30 July 2017 |

== Results ==
=== Heats ===
The heats were started at 09:00.

| Rank | Heat | Lane | Name | Nationality | Time | Notes |
|---|---|---|---|---|---|---|
| 1 | 2 | 5 | Summer McIntosh | Canada | 4:36.15 | Q |
| 2 | 2 | 3 | Katie Grimes | United States | 4:36.68 | Q |
| 3 | 2 | 4 | Emma Weyant | United States | 4:38.52 | Q |
| 4 | 2 | 2 | Ge Chutong | China | 4:38.95 | Q |
| 5 | 3 | 5 | Katinka Hosszú | Hungary | 4:39.15 | Q |
| 6 | 3 | 4 | Yui Ohashi | Japan | 4:39.52 | Q |
| 7 | 2 | 6 | Jenna Forrester | Australia | 4:40.20 | Q |
| 8 | 3 | 6 | Ageha Tanigawa | Japan | 4:40.70 | Q |
| 9 | 3 | 3 | Viktória Mihályvári-Farkas | Hungary | 4:41.16 | |
| 10 | 2 | 7 | Mya Rasmussen | New Zealand | 4:41.98 | |
| 11 | 3 | 2 | Tessa Cieplucha | Canada | 4:44.53 | |
| 12 | 3 | 7 | Freya Colbert | Great Britain | 4:45.55 | |
| 13 | 3 | 8 | Cyrielle Duhamel | France | 4:52.24 | |
| 14 | 2 | 1 | Gabrielle Roncatto | Brazil | 4:52.61 | |
| 15 | 2 | 8 | Florencia Perotti | Argentina | 4:55.43 | |
| 16 | 3 | 9 | Kristen Romano | Puerto Rico | 4:56.39 | |
| 17 | 1 | 4 | Kamonchanok Kwanmuang | Thailand | 4:56.59 | |
| 18 | 1 | 3 | Simone Kabbara | Lebanon | 5:07.33 | |
| 19 | 1 | 5 | Samantha van Vuure | Curaçao | 5:34.75 | |
| – | 2 | 0 | Nikoleta Trniková | Slovakia | Did not start | |
| – | 3 | 0 | Chloe Cheng | Hong Kong | Did not start | |
| – | 3 | 1 | Anastasia Gorbenko | Israel | Did not start | |

=== Final ===
The final was held at 19:01.

| Rank | Lane | Name | Nationality | Time | Notes |
|---|---|---|---|---|---|
| 1st place, gold medalist(s) | 4 | Summer McIntosh | Canada | 4:32.04 | |
| 2nd place, silver medalist(s) | 5 | Katie Grimes | United States | 4:32.67 | |
| 3rd place, bronze medalist(s) | 3 | Emma Weyant | United States | 4:36.00 | |
| 4 | 2 | Katinka Hosszú | Hungary | 4:37.89 | |
| 5 | 7 | Yui Ohashi | Japan | 4:37.99 | |
| 6 | 6 | Ge Chutong | China | 4:38.37 | |
| 7 | 1 | Jenna Forrester | Australia | 4:42.39 | |
| 8 | 8 | Ageha Tanigawa | Japan | 4:44.28 | |
