= Swimming at the 2022 World Aquatics Championships – Men's 100 metre backstroke =

Men's 100 metre backstroke at the 2022 World Aquatics Championships
- Venue: Danube Arena
- Location: Budapest, Hungary
- Dates: 19 June (heats and semifinals); 20 June (final)
- Competitors: 49 from 45 nations
- Winning time: 51.60 WR

Medalists
gold medal	Thomas Ceccon	Italy
silver medal	Ryan Murphy	United States
bronze medal	Hunter Armstrong	United States

The Men's 100 metre backstroke competition at the 2022 World Aquatics Championships was held on 19 and 20 June 2022.

== Records ==
Prior to the competition, the existing world and championship records were as follows.

World record	Ryan Murphy (USA)	51.85	Rio de Janeiro, Brazil	13 August 2016
Competition record	Xu Jiayu (CHN)	52.17	Gwangju, South Korea	22 July 2019

The following new records were set during this competition.

Date	Event	Name	Nationality	Time	Record
19 June	Semifinal	Apostolos Christou	Greece	52.09	CR
20 June	Final	Thomas Ceccon	Italy	51.60	WR

== Results ==
=== Heats ===
The heats were started on 19 June at 09:15.

Rank	Heat	Lane	Name	Nationality	Time	Notes
1	5	4	Hunter Armstrong	United States	52.81	Q
2	5	6	Ryosuke Irie	Japan	53.16	Q
3	6	3	Apostolos Christou	Greece	53.21	Q
4	4	5	Yohann Ndoye Brouard	France	53.22	Q
5	6	2	Ksawery Masiuk	Poland	53.33	Q, NR
6	6	4	Ryan Murphy	United States	53.42	Q
7	6	5	Xu Jiayu	China	53.45	Q
8	4	3	Mewen Tomac	France	53.60	Q
9	4	4	Thomas Ceccon	Italy	53.70	Q
10	5	3	Hugo González	Spain	53.74	Q
11	5	5	Mitch Larkin	Australia	53.77	Q
12	4	2	Lee Ju-ho	South Korea	53.84	Q
13	6	6	Robert Glință	Romania	53.86	Q
14	5	2	Isaac Cooper	Australia	53.87	Q
15	4	6	Luke Greenbank	Great Britain	53.97	Q
16	5	7	Ole Braunschweig	Germany	54.22	Q
17	5	1	Guilherme Basseto	Brazil	54.26	
18	6	7	Andrew Jeffcoat	New Zealand	54.35	
19	5	0	Benedek Kovács	Hungary	54.47	
20	3	3	Mohamed Samy	Egypt	54.67	NR
21	4	8	Oleksandr Zheltiakov	Ukraine	54.86	
22	4	0	Javier Acevedo	Canada	54.97	
23	6	0	Jan Čejka	Czech Republic	55.22	
24	4	1	Michael Laitarovsky	Israel	55.25	
25	3	7	Ģirts Feldbergs	Latvia	55.43	
26	4	7	Joe Litchfield	Great Britain	55.52	
27	3	9	Chuang Mu-lun	Chinese Taipei	55.57	
28	3	5	Ziyad Ahmed	Sudan	55.75	
29	5	8	Quah Zheng Wen	Singapore	55.76	
30	4	9	Armin Lelle	Estonia	55.82	
31	6	9	Omar Pinzón	Colombia	55.95	
32	5	9	Yeziel Morales	Puerto Rico	56.52	
33	3	8	Max Mannes	Luxembourg	56.90	
34	3	4	Charles Hockin	Paraguay	57.01	
35	2	4	Lau Shiu Yue	Hong Kong	57.06	
36	3	0	Farrel Tangkas	Indonesia	57.17	
37	3	1	Patrick Groters	Aruba	57.37	
38	2	3	Yazan Al-Bawwab	Palestine	59.31	
39	2	5	Bede Aitu	Cook Islands	59.54	NR
40	1	5	Omar Al-Rowaila	Brunei	1:00.03	
41	2	1	Juhn Tenorio	Northern Mariana Islands	1:00.93	
42	1	3	Mekhayl Engel	Curaçao	1:01.46	
43	2	7	Samiul Islam Rafi	Bangladesh	1:02.31	
44	2	2	Charles Bennici	Cambodia	1:02.57	
45	1	4	Benjamin Ko	Guam	1:02.66	
46	2	6	Dennis Mhini	Tanzania	1:04.71	
47	2	0	Mohamed Aan Hussain	Maldives	1:05.77	
48	2	9	Nasser Al-Kindi	Oman	1:06.02	
–	2	8	Faizan Akbar	Pakistan	Did not start	
–	3	2	Jack Kirby	Barbados	Did not start	
–	6	8	Roman Mityukov	Switzerland	Did not start	
–	6	1	Bernhard Reitshammer	Austria	Did not start	
–	3	6	Erikas Grigaitis	Lithuania	Disqualified	

=== Semifinals ===
The semifinals were started on 19 June at 18:18.

Rank	Heat	Lane	Name	Nationality	Time	Notes
1	2	5	Apostolos Christou	Greece	52.09	Q, CR, NR
2	2	2	Thomas Ceccon	Italy	52.12	Q, NR
3	2	4	Hunter Armstrong	United States	52.37	Q
4	2	3	Ksawery Masiuk	Poland	52.58	Q, NR
5	1	5	Yohann Ndoye Brouard	France	52.72	Q
6	1	3	Ryan Murphy	United States	52.80	Q
7	1	4	Ryosuke Irie	Japan	52.85	Q
8	2	1	Robert Glință	Romania	53.00	Q
9	1	6	Mewen Tomac	France	53.41	
10	2	6	Xu Jiayu	China	53.49	
11	1	2	Hugo González	Spain	53.50	
12	1	1	Isaac Cooper	Australia	53.55	
13	2	7	Mitch Larkin	Australia	53.73	
14	2	8	Luke Greenbank	Great Britain	53.99	
15	1	7	Lee Ju-ho	South Korea	54.07	
16	1	8	Ole Braunschweig	Germany	54.18	

=== Final ===
The final was held on 20 June at 19:00.

Rank	Lane	Name	Nationality	Time	Notes
1st place, gold medalist(s)	5	Thomas Ceccon	Italy	51.60	WR
2nd place, silver medalist(s)	7	Ryan Murphy	United States	51.97	
3rd place, bronze medalist(s)	3	Hunter Armstrong	United States	51.98	
4	2	Yohann Ndoye Brouard	France	52.50	
5	4	Apostolos Christou	Greece	52.57	
6	6	Ksawery Masiuk	Poland	52.75	
7	1	Ryosuke Irie	Japan	52.83	
8	8	Robert Glință	Romania	53.63	
