= Hunter Armstrong =

American swimmer (born 2001)

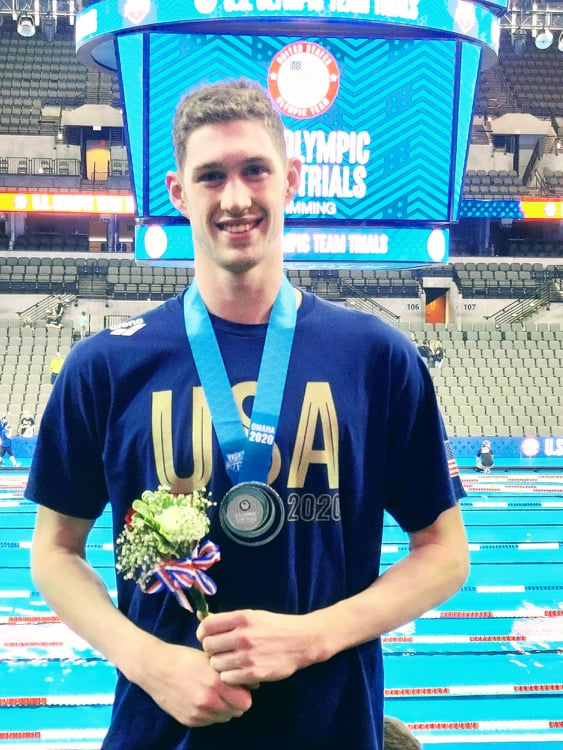
- Armstrong in 2021

Personal information
- Full name: Joseph Hunter Armstrong
- Nicknames: "The Magic Man", "The Magician"
- National team: United States
- Born: January 24, 2001 (age 25) Dover, Ohio, U.S.
- Height: 6 ft 6 in (198 cm)

Sport
- Sport: Swimming
- Turned pro: 2023
- Strokes: Backstroke, freestyle
- Club: Canton City Swimming
- College team: Ohio State University (2020–2022); West Virginia University (2019–2020)
- Coach: Big Mike Davidson, Matt Bowe, Brenda Wherley
Medal record
Men's swimming
Representing the United States
Olympic Games
Gold medal – first place	2020 Tokyo	4×100 m medley
Gold medal – first place	2024 Paris	4×100 m freestyle
Silver medal – second place	2024 Paris	4x100 m medley
World Championships (LC)
Gold medal – first place	2022 Budapest	4×100 m freestyle
Gold medal – first place	2022 Budapest	4×100 m mixed medley
Gold medal – first place	2023 Fukuoka	50 m backstroke
Gold medal – first place	2023 Fukuoka	4×100 m medley
Gold medal – first place	2024 Doha	100 m backstroke
Gold medal – first place	2024 Doha	4×100 m medley
Gold medal – first place	2024 Doha	4×100 m mixed medley
Silver medal – second place	2022 Budapest	50 m backstroke
Silver medal – second place	2022 Budapest	4×100 m medley
Silver medal – second place	2024 Doha	50 m backstroke
Bronze medal – third place	2022 Budapest	100 m backstroke
Bronze medal – third place	2023 Fukuoka	100 m backstroke
Bronze medal – third place	2024 Doha	4×100 m freestyle
Bronze medal – third place	2024 Doha	4×200 m freestyle
Bronze medal – third place	2024 Doha	4×100 m mixed freestyle
World Championships (SC)
Gold medal – first place	2022 Melbourne	4×100 m medley
Silver medal – second place	2022 Melbourne	4×50 m medley

Joseph Hunter Armstrong (born January 24, 2001) is an American competitive swimmer. He is the former world record holder in the long course 50 meter backstroke. At the 2022 World Aquatics Championships, he won a silver medal in the 50 meter backstroke, a bronze medal in the 100 meter backstroke, gold medals in the 4×100 meter freestyle relay and 4×100 meter mixed medley relay, and a silver medal in the 4×100 meter medley relay. At the 2020 Summer Olympics, he won a gold medal in the 4×100 meter medley relay, swimming backstroke in the preliminaries, and placed ninth in the 100 meter backstroke.

== Background ==
Armstrong was born in Dover, Ohio, to Ryan and Edie Armstrong. He has an elder brother named Jake. Armstrong graduated from Dover High School in 2019, where he competed as part of the Canton City Schools swim program.

== Career ==
=== 2021 ===
==== 2020 US Olympic Trials ====
Armstrong placed second in the 100 meter backstroke at the 2020 US Olympic Trials in swimming, qualifying for the 2020 Olympic Games in the event. In the prelims of the 100 meter freestyle, he swam a 49.31 and ranked 19th overall.

==== 2020 Summer Olympics ====
2020 Summer Olympics
Gold medal – first place	4×100 m medley	3:26.78 (h)

In advance of the 2020 Summer Olympics in Tokyo, Japan, Armstrong received the honor of being the US Olympic swim team member to reveal the captains of the swim team for the Olympic Games, he did so with a magic trick.

Armstrong finished ninth in the semifinals of the 100 meter backstroke on day three of competition. Over 100 people gathered at Dover High School in Ohio as part of a watch party and watched his semifinal performance. Members of the First Moravian Church in Dover also gathered to support him virtually.

On day seven, he swam the backstroke leg of the medley relay in the prelims of the 4x100 meter medley relay, advancing the relay to final alongside fellow relay teammates Andrew Wilson, Tom Shields, and Blake Pieroni. On the final day of competition, the finals relay finished first and all of the relay members from the prelims and the final including Armstrong won a gold medal in the event.

==== 2021 World Short Course Championships ====
For the 2021 World Short Course Championships in Abu Dhabi, United Arab Emirates, in December, Armstrong entered to compete in the 100 meter backstroke. On December 14, it was announced that Armstrong had withdrawn from the 100 meter backstroke for the Championships.

=== 2022 ===
On the first day of competition at the Tim Welsh Classic in January 2022, Armstrong helped earn three first-place finishes for Ohio State University, one in the 100 yard backstroke with a 47.05, one in the 4×200 yard freestyle relay, and one in the 4×50 freestyle relay.

==== 2022 Big Ten Championships ====
On the first day of the 2022 Big Ten Conference Championships in February 2022, Armstrong swam a 20.45 for the backstroke portion of the 4×50 yard medley relay to help achieve a first-place finish in a new Big Ten Conference record time of 1:22.13. The second day of competition, he ranked first in the prelims heats of the 50 yard freestyle with a time of 19.02 seconds and qualified for the final later in the day. In the evening final, he won the conference title with a time of 18.93 seconds, finishing over two-tenths of a second ahead of the second-place finisher. Later in the same finals session, Armstrong swam a 44.36 for the backstroke portion of the 4×100 yard medley relay to contribute to a second-place finish in 3:01.44. His time of 44.36 seconds set a new Big Ten Conference record and pool record in the 100 yard backstroke and made him the tenth-fastest performer in the event. Armstrong followed up his 44.36 with a 44.90 in the prelims heats of the 100 yard backstroke the following morning, ranking first heading into the final. For the final he placed second, swimming a time of 44.78 seconds. Later in the session, he led-off the 4×50 yard freestyle with an 18.93 to help achieve a first-place finish in a new Championships record and pool record time of 1:15.28. For the prelims heats of the 100 yard freestyle on the fourth and final day of competition, he swam a time of 41.54 seconds to advance to the final ranked first. He won the Big Ten Conference title for the event in the final, where he was the only swimmer to finish the race in less than 42 seconds, swimming a time of 41.78 seconds. In his last event of the Championships, he lowered his 100-yard freestyle time to a 41.60 for the lead-off leg of the 4×100 yard freestyle relay, helping set new pool and Championships records in a first-place time of 2:47.16.

==== 2022 NCAA Championships ====
At the 2022 NCAA Championships in March in Atlanta, Armstrong started off competition on day one by helping place twelfth in the 4×50 yard medley relay with a split of 21.19 seconds for the backstroke leg of the relay that contributed to the final time of 1:22.98. In his second event of the evening, he split a 1:32.18 for the second leg of the 4×200 yard freestyle relay to help place thirteenth in 6:14.54. The evening of day two, he helped achieve a seventh-place finish in the 4×50 yard freestyle relay, splitting a 19.01 for the lead-off leg of the relay. He ranked eighth and qualified for the final of the 100 yard backstroke in the prelims heats of the event the following morning, finishing in a time of 44.72 seconds. In the final, he placed fifth, finishing 0.38 seconds after the first-place finisher with a time of 44.42 seconds. For the backstroke leg of the 4×100 yard medley relay later in the same session, he swam a 44.74, contributing to a tenth-place finish in 3:03.23. In his final individual event, the 100 yard freestyle on the fourth day, he ranked sixteenth in the prelims heats with a 41.92 and qualified for the b-final. He placed eighth in the b-final, sixteenth overall, with a 42.70. For his final relay event, 4×100 yard freestyle relay, he helped achieve a twelfth-place finish, swimming the lead-off leg of the relay in 41.99 seconds.

==== 2022 International Team Trials ====
Armstrong swam a personal best time of 48.55 seconds in the 100 meter freestyle on day one of the 2022 US International Team Trials in Greensboro, North Carolina in the preliminary heats, qualifying for the final with an overall sixth-rank. He lowered his personal best time an additional three-tenths of a second in the final to tie Drew Kibler for fourth-place with a 48.25. Two days later, he set new Americas, American, and US Open records in the 50 meter backstroke with a time of 24.01 seconds in the prelims heats and advanced to the evening final ranking first. In the final, he set a new world record in the event with a time of 23.71 seconds, breaking the former record of 23.80 seconds set by Kliment Kolesnikov of Russia in 2021 and qualifying for the 2022 World Aquatics Championships team. For the prelims heats of the 100 meter backstroke on day four, he qualified for the final ranking fourth with a 53.55. He won the 100 meter backstroke with a personal best time of 52.20 seconds, qualifying for the World Championships team in the event. Swimming a personal best time of 22.12 seconds in the 50 meter freestyle morning prelims heats on day five of five, he qualified for the evening final ranking sixth. Improving upon his personal best time in the final, with a 22.00, he tied David Curtiss for fifth-place. In addition to his backstroke events, Armstrong was named to the World Championships team in the 4×100 meter freestyle relay for his fourth-place finish in the 100 meter freestyle.

==== 2022 World Aquatics Championships ====
2022 World Championships (LC)
Gold medal – first place	4×100 m freestyle	3:09.34 (h)
Gold medal – first place	4×100 m mixed medley	3:38.79
Silver medal – second place	50 m backstroke	24.14
Silver medal – second place	4×100 m medley	3:27.79 (h)
Bronze medal – third place	100 m backstroke	51.98

Armstrong swam a 48.34 for the lead-off leg of the 4×100 metre freestyle relay in the prelims at the 2022 World Aquatics Championships on the first day of swimming competition, helping qualify the relay for the final ranking first overall. On the finals relay, Caeleb Dressel substituted in for him and Armstrong won a medal for his efforts when the finals relay placed first in a time of 3:09.34. The following morning, he ranked first in the prelims of the 100 meter backstroke, qualifying for the semifinals with a time of 52.81 seconds. Later the same day, he qualified for the final with a time of 52.37 seconds and third-rank in the semifinals. In the final of the 100 meter backstroke the following day, he won the bronze medal with a time of 51.98 seconds, finishing less than four-tenths of a second behind gold medalist Thomas Ceccon of Italy. The following day, he split a 52.14 for the backstroke leg of the 4×100 meter mixed medley relay in the final to help win the gold medal with a time of 3:38.79.

On day seven, Armstrong swam a 24.63 in the prelims of the 50 meter backstroke, ranking fourth overall and qualifying for the semifinals. Later in the day, in the evening semifinals, he lowered his time by almost half a second, qualifying for the final with a time of 24.16 seconds and overall rank of second. The eighth and final day, he split a 53.70 for the backstroke leg of the 4×100 meter medley relay in the prelims to help qualify the relay to the final ranking first. In the evening, he won the gold medal in the 50 metre backstroke with a time of 24.14 seconds, sharing the podium as the medal ceremony with Ksawery Masiuk of Poland and Thomas Ceccon, before another American swimmer had their disqualification for an illegal finish overturned, was awarded the gold medal, and Armstrong was bumped down to a silver medal. Later in the session, Armstrong won a silver medal in the 4×100 meter medley relay when the finals relay, on which Ryan Murphy substituted in for him, finished second in 3:27.79.

==== 2022 Swimming World Cup ====
In the preliminary heats of the 50 meter freestyle at his first FINA Swimming World Cup, the stop of the 2022 FINA Swimming World Cup circuit held in Indianapolis in November, Armstrong qualified for the final ranking sixth with a personal best time of 21.63 seconds. He decreased his personal best time in the final to 21.45 seconds, placing fifth. On day two, he ranked tenth in the preliminary heats of the 50 meter backstroke with a personal best time of 23.70 seconds, not qualifying for the final. Later in the same session he ranked twenty-first in the 100 meter freestyle with a personal best time of 48.27 seconds, which was 0.05 seconds faster than fellow American and twenty-second ranked Thomas Heilman. The third day, he ranked ninth in the preliminary heats of the 100 meter backstroke with a personal best time of 51.88 seconds.

==== 2022 U.S. Open Championships ====
Gaining additional competition preparation leading up to the 2022 World Short Course Championships, Armstrong placed second in the b-final of the 50 meter freestyle at the 2022 U.S. Open Swimming Championships on day two with a time of 22.47 seconds. In the finals of the 100 meter backstroke on day three, he won the b-final with a 53.61, a time which was only slower than the 53.07 swam by a-final winner Daniel Diehl. On day four of four, he tied Jake Mitchell for fifth-place in the b-final of the 100 meter freestyle with a time of 50.23 seconds.

==== 2022 World Short Course Championships ====
2022 World Championships (SC)
Gold medal – first place	4×100 m medley	3:18.98 (h)
Silver medal – second place	4×50 m medley	1:30.37 (h)

Approximately two months before the start of the 2022 World Short Course Championships, held with competition beginning December 13, in Melbourne, Australia, Armstrong was named to the roster in the 100 meter freestyle, 50 meter backstroke, and 100 meter backstroke. In his first event, the 100 meter backstroke, he placed seventeenth in the preliminaries on day one with a personal best time of 50.93 seconds. For his second event, the 100 meter freestyle, he achieved a three-way tie for nineteenth-place in the preliminaries with a personal best time of 47.11 seconds. He qualified for his first semifinal on day three, ranking eighth in the preliminaries of the 50 meter backstroke with a personal best time of 23.18 seconds. Later in the session, he helped qualify the 4×50 meter freestyle relay to the final ranking second in 1:24.07, splitting a 20.94 for the third leg of the relay. On the third evening, he tied for eighth-rank in the 50 meter backstroke semifinals with a personal best time of 23.05 seconds that qualified him for a swim-off and then placed fifth in the 4×50 meter freestyle relay with a finals relay time of 1:24.03.

Day four, Armstrong started off with a 20.81 on the second leg of the 4×50 meter mixed freestyle relay in the preliminaries, contributing to a total time of 1:29.97 and helping qualify for the final ranking fourth. Later in the morning, he lost the swim-off against Apostolos Christou of Greece for the last spot in the final of the 50 meter backstroke with a time of 23.30 seconds. In the evening, he was replaced by a fellow roster member on the finals relay and the finals relay finished in a time of 1:29.18 to take fourth-place. The penultimate morning, he helped qualify the 4×50 meter medley relay for the final in fifth-rank with a backstroke time of 23.34 seconds that contributed to the preliminary mark of 1:32.67. The finals relay finished second in a time of 1:30.37, and he and the other prelims and finals relay members won the silver medal for their efforts.

Achieving a personal best time of 50.68 seconds in the 4×100 meter medley relay for the backstroke leg in the preliminaries, Armstrong and his fellow prelims relay teammates qualified the relay for the final ranking first with a time of 3:23.65. Handing the backstroke over to Ryan Murphy for the finals relay, he won a gold medal for his contribution when the finals relay tied Australia for first in a world record time of 3:18.98.

=== 2026 ===
Armstrong won first place in the 2026 Enhanced Games, a competition which allowed performance enhancing drugs, despite competing as a "non-enhanced" (drug-free) athlete. On 24 May 2026, he came first in the competition's first competitive swimming event, the 50-meter backstroke, winning $250,000. He was tested for drugs immediately afterwards.

== International championships (50 m) ==
Meet	50 backstroke	100 backstroke	4×100 freestyle	4×200 freestyle	4×100 medley	4×100 mixed freestyle	4×100 mixed medley
OG 2020	—N/a	9th			(gold) ^{[a]}	—N/a	
WC 2022	2nd place, silver medalist(s)	3rd place, bronze medalist(s)	(gold) ^{[a]}		(silver) ^{[a]}		1st place, gold medalist(s)
WC 2023	1st place, gold medalist(s)	3rd place, bronze medalist(s)			(gold) ^{[a]}		
WC 2024	2nd place, silver medalist(s)	1st place, gold medalist(s)	(bronze) ^{[a]}	3rd place, bronze medalist(s)	1st place, gold medalist(s)	3rd place, bronze medalist(s)	1st place, gold medalist(s)
OG 2024	—N/a	9th	1st place, gold medalist(s)		2nd place, silver medalist(s)	—N/a	

^{a} Armstrong swam only in the preliminary heats.

== International championships (25 m) ==
Meet	100 freestyle	50 backstroke	100 backstroke	4×50 freestyle	4×50 medley	4×100 medley	4×50 mixed freestyle
WC 2022	19th	8th (sf)	17th	5th	(silver) ^{[a]}	(gold) ^{[a]}	4th^{[a]}

^{a} Armstrong swam only in the preliminary heats.

== Personal best times ==
=== Long course meters (50 m pool) ===
Event	Time	Meet	Location	Date	Notes	Ref
50 m freestyle	22.00	2022 US International Team Trials	Greensboro, North Carolina	April 30, 2022		
100 m freestyle	48.25	2022 US International Team Trials	Greensboro, North Carolina	April 26, 2022		
50 m backstroke	23.71	2022 US International Team Trials	Greensboro, North Carolina	April 28, 2022	AM, NR, US, former WR	
100 m backstroke	51.98	2022 World Aquatics Championships	Budapest, Hungary	June 20, 2022		

Legend: WR – World record; AM – Americas record; e – equalled existing record; NR – American record; US – US Open record;
Records not set in finals: h – heat; sf – semifinal; r – relay 1st leg; rh – relay heat 1st leg; b – B final; † – en route to final mark; so – swim-off; tt – time trial

=== Short course meters (25 m pool) ===
Event	Time		Meet	Location	Date	Ref
50 m freestyle	21.45		2022 FINA Swimming World Cup	Indianapolis, Indiana	November 3, 2022	
100 m freestyle	47.11	h	2022 World Short Course Championships	Melbourne, Australia	December 14, 2022	
50 m backstroke	23.05	sf	2022 World Short Course Championships	Melbourne, Australia	December 15, 2022	
100 m backstroke	50.68	h, r	2022 World Short Course Championships	Melbourne, Australia	December 18, 2022	

Legend: h – preliminary heat; sf – semifinal; r – relay 1st leg

=== Short course yards (25 yd pool) ===
Event	Time		Meet	Location	Date	Ref
50 yd freestyle	18.93		2022 Big Ten Conference Championships	West Lafayette, Indiana	February 24, 2022	
100 yd freestyle	41.54	h	2022 Big Ten Conference Championships	West Lafayette, Indiana	February 26, 2022	
100 yd backstroke	44.36	r	2022 Big Ten Conference Championships	West Lafayette, Indiana	February 24, 2022	

Legend: h – preliminary heat; r – relay 1st leg

== World records ==
=== Long course meters (50 m pool) ===
No.	Event	Time	Meet	Location	Date	Status	Ref
1	50 m backstroke	23.71	2022 US International Team Trials	Greensboro, North Carolina	April 28, 2022	Current	

== Continental and national records ==
=== Long course meters (50 m pool) ===
No.	Event	Time		Meet	Location	Date	Type	Status	Notes	Ref
1	50 m backstroke	24.01	h	2022 US International Team Trials	Greensboro, North Carolina	April 28, 2022	AM, NR, US	Former		
2	50 m backstroke (2)	23.71		2022 US International Team Trials	Greensboro, North Carolina	April 28, 2022	AM, NR, US	Current	Former WR	

Legend: WR – World record; AM – Americas record; e – equalled existing record; NR – American record; US – US Open record;
Records not set in finals: h – heat; sf – semifinal; r – relay 1st leg; rh – relay heat 1st leg; b – B final; † – en route to final mark; so – swim-off; tt – time trial

== Awards and honors ==
- Ohio State University, Athlete of the Year (male): 2022
- Big Ten Conference, Swimmer of the Week (men's): January 26, 2022
- SwimSwam, Ultra Swimmer of the Month: April 2022

== See also ==
- World record progression 50 metres backstroke

Records
Preceded by (Russia) Kliment Kolesnikov	Men's 50-meter backstroke world record holder (long course); April 28, 2022 – present	Succeeded by Incumbent
