= Jung Hyun-young =

South Korean swimmer (born 2005)

Personal information
- Nationality: South Korean
- Born: September 12, 2005 (age 20) Geoje, South Korea

Sport
- Sport: Swimming
- Event: Freestyle relay

Korean name
- Hangul: 정현영
- RR: Jeong Hyeonyeong
- MR: Chŏng Hyŏnyŏng

Jung Hyun-young (Korean: 정현영; born September 12, 2005) is a South Korean swimmer.

== Career ==
In July 2021, she represented South Korea at the 2020 Summer Olympics held in Tokyo, Japan. She competed in 4 × 200m freestyle relay event. The team did not advance to compete in the final.
