= Moon Seung-woo =

South Korean swimmer

Personal information
- Nationality: South Korean
- Born: December 3, 2002 (age 23) Seoul, South Korea

Sport
- Sport: Swimming
- Event: Butterfly

Korean name
- Hangul: 문승우
- RR: Mun Seungu
- MR: Mun Sŭngu

Moon Seung-woo (Korean: 문승우; born December 3, 2002) is a South Korean swimmer.

== Career ==
In July 2021, he represented South Korea at the 2020 Summer Olympics held in Tokyo, Japan. He competed in 100m butterfly and 200m butterfly events. In both events, he did not advance to compete in the semifinal.
