= Turkey at the 2025 World Aquatics Championships =

- Flag of Turkey
- World Aquatics code: TUR
- National federation: Turkish Swimming Federation
- Website: tyf.gov.tr (in Turkish)

in Singapore
- Competitors: 9 in 3 sports
- Medals: Gold 0 Silver 0 Bronze 0 Total 0

World Aquatics Championships appearances
- 1973; 1975; 1978; 1982; 1986; 1991; 1994; 1998; 2001; 2003; 2005; 2007; 2009; 2011; 2013; 2015; 2017; 2019; 2022; 2023; 2024; 2025

Turkey competed at the 2025 World Aquatics Championships in Singapore from July 11 to August 3, 2025.

== Competitors ==
The following is the list of competitors in the Championships.

Sport	Men	Women	Total
Artistic swimming	0	2	2
Open water swimming	2	2	4
Swimming	3	0	3
Total	5	4	9

== Artistic swimming ==
Women

Athlete	Event	Preliminaries		Final	
Athlete	Event	Points	Rank	Points	Rank
Ece Üngör	Solo technical routine	226.0333	18	Did not advance	
Ece Üngör	Solo free routine	203.8162	15	Did not advance	
Selin Hürmeriç; Ece Üngör	Free technical routine	220.5633	15	Did not advance	

== Open water swimming ==
Men

Athlete	Event	Heat		Semi-final		Final	
Athlete	Event	Time	Rank	Time	Rank	Time	Rank
Atakan Ercan	Men's 3 km knockout sprints	18:03.2	22	Did not advance			
Atakan Ercan	Men's 5 km	—				1:02:41.2	44
Emre Sarp Zeytinoğlu	Men's 3 km knockout sprints	17:41.5	17	Did not advance			
Emre Sarp Zeytinoğlu	Men's 5 km	—				1:02:43.8	48

Women

Athlete	Event	Heat		Semi-final		Final	
Athlete	Event	Time	Rank	Time	Rank	Time	Rank
Su İnal	Women's 3 km knockout sprints	19:12.2	18	Did not advance			
Su İnal	Women's 5 km	—				1:06:26.0	27
Su İnal	Women's 10 km	—				2:23:55.8	42
Selinnur Sade	Women's 3 km knockout sprints	19:23.5	23	Did not advance			
Selinnur Sade	Women's 5 km	—				OTL	

Mixed

Athlete	Event	Final	
Athlete	Event	Time	Rank
Atakan Ercan; Su İnal; Selinnur Sade; Emre Sarp Zeytinoğlu	Team relay	1:15:42.8	15

== Swimming ==
Turkey entered 3 swimmers.

Men

Athlete	Event	Heat		Semi-final		Final	
Athlete	Event	Time	Rank	Time	Rank	Time	Rank
Nusrat Allahverdi	50 m breaststroke	27.26	20	Did not advance			
Nusrat Allahverdi	100 m breaststroke	1:01.11	31	Did not advance			
Emre Sakçı	50 m breaststroke	27.18	14 Q	27.04	14	Did not advance	
Emre Sakçı	50 m butterfly	24.62	52	Did not advance			
Kuzey Tunçelli	800 m freestyle	7:45.13 NR	6 Q	—		7:49.09	6
Kuzey Tunçelli	1500 m freestyle	14:45.28	3 Q	—		14:52.44	6
