= Open water swimming at the 2022 World Aquatics Championships – Mixed 4 × 1500 metre relay =

Mixed 4 × 1500 metre open water relay at the 2022 World Aquatics Championships
- Venue: Lake Lupa
- Location: Hungary
- Dates: 26 June
- Competitors: 92 from 23 nations
- Teams: 23
- Winning time: 1:04:40.5

Medalists
gold medal	Lea Boy; Oliver Klemet; Leonie Beck; Florian Wellbrock	Germany
silver medal	Réka Rohács; Anna Olasz; Dávid Betlehem; Kristóf Rasovszky	Hungary
bronze medal	Ginevra Taddeucci; Giulia Gabbrielleschi; Domenico Acerenza; Gregorio Paltrinieri	Italy

The mixed 4 × 1500 metre relay event at the 2022 World Aquatics Championships was held on 26 June 2022 in Lake Lupa, Hungary.

Four teams were disqualified for going off course during the first leg. During the final leg, the leading pack consisted of Hungary, Italy, Germany and France. Germany's Florian Wellbrock overtook the rest of the teams to win for Germany with a time of 1:04:40.5, while Italy and Hungary both finished in 1:04:43.0. After photo analysis, Hungary was awarded the silver and Italy the bronze.

== Event description ==
Each athlete swam three 500 m loops to make a total distance of 1500 m per swimmer. The teams consisted of two men and two women, meaning each team completed 6 km in total. The men and women could swim in any order.

== Background ==
It was the first time an open water relay of this distance was held at the World Aquatics Championships. The previous edition of the World Championships included the mixed 5 km team relay, in which four swimmers swam 1250 m to make up a total team distance of 5 km. Eight swimmers from the 1500 m pool event also competed in the 4 × 1500 metre relay.

== Race ==
The race took place at 13:00 on 26 June in Lake Lupa, Hungary. During the race, the water temperature was 27.1 °C (80.8 °F) (Note: Measured two hours before the race began) and the air temperature was 31 °C (88 °F).

Before the first changover, the leading four teams (South Africa, Greece, Spain and South Korea) were disqualified for deviating off the assigned course. Chinese Taipei's Cho Cheng-chi led at the first changeover. Germany led at the second changeover, before Hungary overtook them to enter the final changeover with a 4.6-second advantage. 300 metres after the final changeover, Hungary's Kristóf Rasovszky was caught up by the swimmers behind him, which formed a small group of lead swimmers including Italy's Gregorio Paltrinieri, France's Marc-Antoine Olivier, and Germany's Florian Wellbrock. Paltrinieri overtook Rasovszky and led the race going into the final 500 m lap, before Wellbrock overtook them both near the finish to win for Germany with a time of 1:04:40.5. Italy and Hungary both finished in 1:04:43.0, and photo analysis was needed to determine which team finished first. In the end, Hungary was awarded the silver and Italy the bronze.

Results
Rank	Nation	Swimmer (Note: Names ordered according to the order they swam in)	Time
1st place, gold medalist(s)	Germany	Lea Boy; Oliver Klemet; Leonie Beck; Florian Wellbrock	1:04:40.5
2nd place, silver medalist(s)	Hungary	Réka Rohács; Anna Olasz; Dávid Betlehem; Kristóf Rasovszky	1:04:43.0
3rd place, bronze medalist(s)	Italy	Ginevra Taddeucci; Giulia Gabbrielleschi; Domenico Acerenza; Gregorio Paltrinieri	1:04:43.0
4	France	Caroline Jouisse; Aurélie Muller; Sacha Velly; Marc-Antoine Olivier	1:04:56.4
5	Brazil	Cibelle Jungblut; Viviane Jungblut; Bruce Almeida; Guilherme Costa	1:05:29.1
6	Australia	Chelsea Gubecka; Moesha Johnson; Bailey Armstrong; Nicholas Sloman	1:05:30.8
7	United States	Mariah Denigan; Bella Sims; Brennan Gravley; Charlie Clark	1:05:50.5
8	China	Sun Jiake; Xin Xin; Tang Haoyang; Zhang Ziyang	1:06:21.8
9	Japan	Airi Ebina; Kaiki Furuhata; Yukimi Moriyama; Taishin Minamide	1:06:32.9
10	Portugal	Angélica André; Mafalda Rosa; Tiago Campos; Diogo Cardoso	1:07:08.0
11	Canada	Katrina Bellio; Alexander Axon; Emma Finlin; Eric Brown	1:07:34.7
12	Turkey	Burcu Naz Narin; Sevim Eylül Süpürgeci; Burhanettin Hacısağır; Emir Batur Albayrak	1:07:36.2
13	Mexico	Martha Sandoval; Paulo Strehlke; Paulina Alanís; Arturo Pérez	1:09:02.4
14	Chinese Taipei	Cho Cheng-chi; Cho Pei-chi; Teng Yu-wen; Wang Yi-chen	1:10:53.2
15	Hong Kong	William Yan Thorley; Nip Tsz Yin; Nikita Lam; Keith Sin	1:11:08.4
16	Kazakhstan	Lev Cherepanov; Xeniya Romanchuk; Diana Taszhanova; Vitaliy Khudyakov	1:11:09.9
17	Ecuador	Juan Alcívar; Isabella Babbitt; Jocelyn Bermeo; Jahir López	1:11:32.2
18	Singapore	Ritchie Oh; Chantal Liew; Samantha Yeo; Artyom Lukasevits	1:12:16.8
19	Puerto Rico	Diego Ortiz; Alondra Quiles; Leandra Díaz; Jamarr Bruno	1:17:11.9
–	South Africa	Connor Buck; Amica de Jager; Ruan Breytenbach; Catherine van Rensburg	Disqualified
–	Greece	Dimitrios Markos; Ilektra Lebl; Afroditi Katsiara; Athanasios Kynigakis	Disqualified
–	Spain	María de Valdés; Ángela Martínez; Alberto Martínez; Carlos Garach	Disqualified
–	South Korea	Park Jae-hun; Lee Chang-min; Lee Hae-rim; Lee Jeong-min	Disqualified

== Further information ==
- 19th FINA World Championships 2022 | Budapest | The Movie 🎥🎞 (Video). World Aquatics. 26 December 2022. Event occurs at 00:02:30 – via YouTube. – Highlights from the event
- "Open Water Swimmers Make Debut at Fina World Championships". USA Swimming. 26 June 2022. Archived from the original on 25 October 2025. – Further information on the United States performance and quotes from their team
- "Sporttörténelmet írt, Ezüstérmes a Magyar Vegyesváltó a Lupa-tavon". 24.hu (in Hungarian). 26 June 2022. Archived from the original on 12 September 2024. – Further information on the Hungarian performance
