= Turkey at the 2015 World Aquatics Championships =

- Flag of Turkey
- World Aquatics code: TUR
- National federation: Türkiye Yüzme Federasyonu
- Website: www.tyf.gov.tr

in Kazan, Russia
- Competitors: 12 in 2 sports
- Medals: Gold 0 Silver 0 Bronze 0 Total 0

World Aquatics Championships appearances
- 1973; 1975; 1978; 1982; 1986; 1991; 1994; 1998; 2001; 2003; 2005; 2007; 2009; 2011; 2013; 2015; 2017; 2019; 2022; 2023; 2024; 2025

Turkey competed at the 2015 World Aquatics Championships in Kazan, Russia from 24 July to 9 August 2015.

== Swimming ==
Turkish swimmers have achieved qualifying standards in the following events (up to a maximum of 2 swimmers in each event at the A-standard entry time, and 1 at the B-standard):

Men

| Athlete | Event | Heat | | Semifinal | | Final | |
| Athlete | Event | Time | Rank | Time | Rank | Time | Rank |
|---|---|---|---|---|---|---|---|
| Demir Atasoy | 50 m freestyle | 23.16 | 40 | did not advance | | | |
| Demir Atasoy | 50 m breaststroke | 28.38 | 36 | did not advance | | | |
| Demir Atasoy | 100 m breaststroke | 1:02.35 | 39 | did not advance | | | |
| İskender Baslakov | 50 m backstroke | 25.94 | 33 | did not advance | | | |
| Doğa Çelik | 200 m freestyle | 1:50.38 | 42 | did not advance | | | |
| Kemal Arda Gürdal | 100 m freestyle | 49.80 | 35 | did not advance | | | |
| Nezır Karap | 400 m freestyle | 3:50.07 | =21 | —N/a | | did not advance | |
| Nezır Karap | 1500 m freestyle | 15:32.60 | 31 | —N/a | | did not advance | |
| Alpkan Örnek | 200 m individual medley | 2:03.93 | 29 | did not advance | | | |
| Alpkan Örnek | 400 m individual medley | 4:22.72 | 27 | —N/a | | did not advance | |
| Doruk Tekin | 100 m backstroke | 56.57 | 43 | did not advance | | | |
| İskender Baslakov; Doǧa Çelik; Kaan Türker Ayar; Kemal Arda Gürdal | 4×100 m freestyle relay | 3:17.97 | 15 | —N/a | | did not advance | |
| Nezır Karap; Doǧa Çelik; Kaan Türker Ayar; Kemal Arda Gürdal | 4×200 m freestyle relay | 7:22.15 | 21 | —N/a | | did not advance | |
| Doruk Tekin; Demir Atasoy; Kaan Türker Ayar; Kemal Arda Gürdal | 4×100 m medley relay | 3:40.46 | 18 | —N/a | | did not advance | |

Women

| Athlete | Event | Heat | | Semifinal | | Final | |
| Athlete | Event | Time | Rank | Time | Rank | Time | Rank |
|---|---|---|---|---|---|---|---|
| Ekaterina Avramova | 100 m freestyle | 56.51 | 42 | did not advance | | | |
| Ekaterina Avramova | 50 m backstroke | 29.60 | 34 | did not advance | | | |
| Ekaterina Avramova | 100 m backstroke | 1:02.81 | 40 | did not advance | | | |
| Gizem Bozkurt | 200 m freestyle | 2:02.63 | 41 | did not advance | | | |
| Merve Eroğlu | 400 m freestyle | 4:24.77 | 37 | —N/a | | did not advance | |
| Zeynep Güneş | 50 m breaststroke | 31.45 | 22 | did not advance | | | |
| Zeynep Güneş | 100 m breaststroke | 1:07.60 | 17 | did not advance | | | |
| Zeynep Güneş | 200 m breaststroke | 2:23.81 | 5 Q | 2:24.01 | 11 | did not advance | |
| Zeynep Güneş | 200 m individual medley | 2:12.91 | 12 Q | 2:11.46 | 9 | did not advance | |
| Halime Zülal Zeren | 200 m backstroke | 2:15.87 | 32 | did not advance | | | |
| Gizem Bozkurt; Ekaterina Avramova; Merve Eroğlu; Halime Zülal Zeren | 4×100 m freestyle relay | 3:53.22 | 19 | —N/a | | did not advance | |
| Gizem Bozkurt; Ekaterina Avramova; Halime Zülal Zeren; Merve Eroğlu | 4×200 m freestyle relay | 8:24.39 | 17 | —N/a | | did not advance | |
| Halime Zülal Zeren; Zeynep Güneş; Gizem Bozkurt; Ekaterina Avramova | 4×100 m medley relay | 4:06.34 | 21 | —N/a | | did not advance | |

Mixed

| Athlete | Event | Heat | | Final | |
| Athlete | Event | Time | Rank | Time | Rank |
|---|---|---|---|---|---|
| Doğa Çelik; Kemal Arda Gürdal; Ekaterina Avramova; Gizem Bozkurt | 4×100 m freestyle relay | 3:33.11 | 12 | did not advance | |
| Ekaterina Avramova; Zeynep Güneş; Kaan Türker Ayar; Kemal Arda Gürdal | 4×100 m medley relay | DSQ | | did not advance | |

== Synchronized swimming ==
Turkey has qualified four synchronized swimmers to compete in each of the following events.

Women

| Athlete | Event | Preliminaries | | Final | |
| Athlete | Event | Points | Rank | Points | Rank |
|---|---|---|---|---|---|
| Defne Bakırcı | Solo free routine | 73.4667 | 21 | did not advance | |
| Defne Bakırcı; Mısra Gündeş | Duet technical routine | 72.7531 | 26 | did not advance | |
| Defne Bakırcı; Mısra Gündeş | Duet free routine | 75.1667 | 26 | did not advance | |

Mixed

| Athlete | Event | Preliminaries | | Final | |
| Athlete | Event | Points | Rank | Points | Rank |
|---|---|---|---|---|---|
| Gökçe Akgün; Yağmur Demircan | Duet technical routine | 71.4913 | 6 Q | 74.7756 | 6 |
| Gökçe Akgün; Yağmur Demircan | Duet free routine | 76.5333 | 9 Q | 76.3667 | 9 |
