= Turkey at the 2019 World Aquatics Championships =

- Flag of Turkey
- FINA code: TUR
- National federation: Türkiye Yüzme Federasyonu
- Website: www.tyf.gov.tr

in Gwangju, South Korea
- Medals: Gold 0 Silver 0 Bronze 0 Total 0

World Aquatics Championships appearances
- 1973; 1975; 1978; 1982; 1986; 1991; 1994; 1998; 2001; 2003; 2005; 2007; 2009; 2011; 2013; 2015; 2017; 2019; 2022; 2023; 2024

Turkey competed at the 2019 World Aquatics Championships in Gwangju, South Korea from 12 to 28 July.

== Artistic swimming ==
Turkey entered four artistic swimmers.

Women

Athlete	Event	Preliminaries		Final	
Athlete	Event	Points	Rank	Points	Rank
Defne Bakırcı	Solo technical routine	73.2867	21	did not advance	
Defne Bakırcı	Solo free routine	74.5000	26	did not advance	
Defne Bakırcı; Mısra Gündeş	Duet technical routine	76.1084	26	did not advance	
Defne Bakırcı; Mısra Gündeş	Duet free routine	75.1667	32	did not advance	

Mixed

Athlete	Event	Preliminaries		Final	
Athlete	Event	Points	Rank	Points	Rank
Gökçe Akgün; Rümeysa Ünal	Duet free routine	70.2000	10 Q	70.9000	10

== Swimming ==
Turkey entered 15 swimmers.

Men

Athlete	Event	Heat		Semifinal		Final	
Athlete	Event	Time	Rank	Time	Rank	Time	Rank
Metin Aydin	50 m backstroke	25.95	=37	did not advance			
Metin Aydin	100 m backstroke	55.40	33	did not advance			
Metin Aydin	200 m individual medley	2:01.72	26	did not advance			
Erge Gezmis	200 m freestyle	1:49.35	33	did not advance			
Erge Gezmis	400 m freestyle	3:54.01	27	—		did not advance	
Umitcan Gures	50 m butterfly	23.86	=25	did not advance			
Umitcan Gures	100 m butterfly	52.86	21	did not advance			
Berkay-Ömer Öğretir	100 m breaststroke	1:00.26	22	did not advance			
Berkay-Ömer Öğretir	200 m breaststroke	2:13.62	31	did not advance			
Hüseyin Emre Sakçı	50 m freestyle	22.54	32	did not advance			
Hüseyin Emre Sakçı	100 m freestyle	50.24	47	did not advance			
Hüseyin Emre Sakçı	50 m breaststroke	26.87	=4 Q	27.17	=11	did not advance	
Hüseyin Emre Sakçı; İskender Başlakov; Kemal Arda Gürdal; Yalım Acımış	4 × 100 m freestyle relay	3:18.01	21	—		did not advance	
Metin Aydın; Berkay Öğretir; Ümitcan Güreş; Hüseyin Emre Sakçı	4 × 100 m medley relay	3:36.85 NR	16	—		did not advance	

Women

Athlete	Event	Heat		Semifinal		Final	
Athlete	Event	Time	Rank	Time	Rank	Time	Rank
Ekaterina Avramova	50 m backstroke	29.61	28	did not advance			
Ekaterina Avramova	100 m backstroke	1:02.24	35	did not advance			
Ekaterina Avramova	200 m backstroke	2:14.15	28	did not advance			
Viktoriya Zeynep Güneş	100 m breaststroke	1:09.05	=27	did not advance			
Viktoriya Zeynep Güneş	200 m breaststroke	2:27.67	20	did not advance			
Viktoriya Zeynep Güneş	200 m individual medley	2:12.42	15 Q	2:12.40	14	did not advance	
Viktoriya Zeynep Güneş	400 m individual medley	4:46.01	17	—		did not advance	
Selen Özbilen	50 m freestyle	25.83	31	did not advance			
Selen Özbilen	100 m freestyle	55.71	34	did not advance			
Aleyna Özkan	50 m butterfly	27.00	30	did not advance			
Aleyna Özkan	100 m butterfly	1:00.68	33	did not advance			
Gülşen Samancı	50 m breaststroke	32.28	32	did not advance			
Nida Eliz Üstündağ	200 m butterfly	2:11.09	18	did not advance			
Selen Özbilen; Gizem Güvenç; Viktoriya Zeynep Güneş; Ekaterina Avramova	4 × 100 m freestyle relay	3:43.03	16	—		did not advance	
Ekaterina Avramova; Viktoriya Zeynep Güneş; Aleyna Özkan; Selen Özbilen	4 × 100 m medley relay	4:05.72 NR	20	—		did not advance	

Mixed

Athlete	Event	Heat		Final	
Athlete	Event	Time	Rank	Time	Rank
Yalım Acımış; Hüseyin Emre Sakçı; Selen Özbilen; Viktoriya Zeynep Güneş	4 × 100 m freestyle relay	3:31.38	14	did not advance	
Ekaterina Avramova; Berkay Öğretir; Umitcan Gures; Selen Özbilen	4 × 100 m medley relay	3:50.49	16	did not advance	
