= Artistic swimming at the 2022 World Aquatics Championships – Duet technical routine =

Duet technical routine at the 2022 World Aquatics Championships
- Venue: Szechy Pool
- Location: Budapest, Hungary
- Dates: 17 June (preliminary); 19 June (final)
- Competitors: 64 from 32 nations
- Teams: 32
- Winning points: 93.7536

Medalists
gold medal	Wang Liuyi; Wang Qianyi	China
silver medal	Maryna Aleksiiva; Vladyslava Aleksiiva	Ukraine
bronze medal	Anna-Maria Alexandri; Eirini-Marina Alexandri	Austria

The Duet technical routine competition at the 2022 World Aquatics Championships was held on 17 and 19 June 2022.

== Results ==
The preliminary round was started on 17 June at 13:00. The final was held on 19 June at 16:00.

Green denotes finalists

Rank	Nation	Swimmers	Preliminary		Final	
Rank	Nation	Swimmers	Points	Rank	Points	Rank
1st place, gold medalist(s)	China	Wang Liuyi; Wang Qianyi	92.6378	1	93.7536	1
2nd place, silver medalist(s)	Ukraine	Maryna Aleksiiva; Vladyslava Aleksiiva	91.8565	2	91.8617	2
3rd place, bronze medalist(s)	Austria	Anna-Maria Alexandri; Eirini-Marina Alexandri	90.2869	3	91.2622	3
4	Japan	Moe Higa; Megumu Yoshida	90.0294	4	89.9444	4
5	Italy	Linda Cerruti; Costanza Ferro	89.4116	5	89.8733	5
6	Mexico	Nuria Diosdado; Joana Jiménez	85.6160	6	87.1936	6
7	United States	Anita Alvarez; Megumi Field	85.5281	8	86.4262	7
8	Netherlands	Bregje de Brouwer; Marloes Steenbeek	85.5859	7	86.1420	8
9	Great Britain	Kate Shortman; Isabelle Thorpe	84.8081	9	84.9751	9
10	Israel	Eden Blecher; Shelly Bobritsky	84.0556	10	84.2990	10
11	Germany	Marlene Bojer; Michelle Zimmer	82.7121	11	82.7570	11
12	South Korea	Hur Yoon-seo; Lee Ri-young	80.6840	12	80.3069	12
13	Switzerland	Emma Grosvenor; Margaux Varesio	79.9267	13		
14	San Marino	Jasmine Verbena; Jasmine Zonzini	78.7143	14		
15	Brazil	Jullia Catharino; Laura Miccuci	78.4679	15		
16	Singapore	Debbie Soh; Miya Yong	78.4116	16		
17	Serbia	Sofija Džipković; Jelena Kontić	76.3368	17		
18	Czech Republic	Karolína Klusková; Aneta Mrázková	76.2891	18		
19	Hungary	Linda Farkas; Boglárka Gács	75.4002	19		
20	Egypt	Nadine Barsoum; Nehal Saafan	75.3417	20		
21	Colombia	Melisa Ceballos; Estefanía Roa	74.3560	21		
22	Uruguay	Clara De León; Agustina Medina	72.7254	22		
23	Argentina	Luisina Caussi; Camila Pineda	72.2259	23		
24	Sweden	Anna Högdal; Clara Ternström	71.0101	24		
25	Turkey	Selin Telci; Ece Üngör	70.1780	25		
26	Australia	Georgia Courage-Gardiner; Milena Waldmann	69.6770	26		
27	Cuba	Gabriela Alpajon; Stephany Urbina	66.7595	27		
28	Thailand	Pongpimporn Pongsuwan; Supitchaya Songpan	66.5138	28		
29	Malta	Thea Blake; Ana Culic	64.5435	29		
30	South Africa	Skye MacDonald; Xera Vegter	64.3119	30		
31	Aruba	Maria Salazar; Melanie Tromp	64.1479	31		
32	Costa Rica	María Alfaro; Anna Mitinian	63.6299	32		
