= Turkey at the 2024 World Aquatics Championships =

- Flag of Turkey
- FINA code: TUR
- National federation: Turkish Swimming Federation
- Website: tyf.gov.tr (in Turkish)

in Doha, Qatar
- Competitors: 15 in 4 sports
- Medals: Gold 0 Silver 0 Bronze 0 Total 0

World Aquatics Championships appearances
- 1973; 1975; 1978; 1982; 1986; 1991; 1994; 1998; 2001; 2003; 2005; 2007; 2009; 2011; 2013; 2015; 2017; 2019; 2022; 2023; 2024

Turkey competed at the 2024 World Aquatics Championships in Doha, Qatar from 2 to 18 February.

== Competitors ==
The following is the list of competitors in the Championships.

Sport	Men	Women	Total
Artistic swimming	0	3	3
Diving	0	1	1
Open water swimming	2*	2	4*
Swimming	4*	4	8*
Total	5*	10	15*

- Emir Batur Albayrak competed in both open water swimming and pool swimming.

== Artistic swimming ==
Women

Athlete	Event	Preliminaries		Final	
Athlete	Event	Points	Rank	Points	Rank
Ece Üngör	Solo technical routine	212.4533	15	Did not advance	
Ece Üngör	Solo free routine	188.4854	16	Did not advance	
Duru Kanberoğlu; Bade Yıldız	Duet technical routine	187.2751	29	Did not advance	
Duru Kanberoğlu; Bade Yıldız	Duet free routine	149.1166	27	Did not advance	

== Diving ==
Men

Athlete	Event	Preliminaries		Semifinals		Final	
Athlete	Event	Points	Rank	Points	Rank	Points	Rank
Sude Köprülü	1 m springboard	167.30	38	—		Did not advance	
Sude Köprülü	3 m springboard	222.75	34	Did not advance			

== Open water swimming ==
Men

Athlete	Event	Time	Rank
Emir Batur Albayrak	Men's 5 km	53:20.7	18
Emir Batur Albayrak	Men's 10 km	1:49:58.6	27
Burhanettin Hacı Sağır	Men's 5 km	55:01.2	37
Burhanettin Hacı Sağır	Men's 10 km	1:54:00.3	46

Women

Athlete	Event	Time	Rank
Sezen Akanda Boz	Women's 5 km	1:05:02.5	52
Sezen Akanda Boz	Women's 10 km	Did not finish	
Tuna Erdoğan	Women's 5 km	59:07.8	26
Tuna Erdoğan	Women's 10 km	2:06:42.6	45

Mixed

Athlete	Event	Time	Rank
Emir Batur Albayrak; Sezen Akanda Boz; Tuna Erdoğan; Burhanettin Hacı Sağır	Team relay	1:08:42.9	16

== Swimming ==
Turkey entered 8 swimmers.

Men

Athlete	Event	Heat		Semifinal		Final	
Athlete	Event	Time	Rank	Time	Rank	Time	Rank
Emir Batur Albayrak	400 metre freestyle	3:56.34	36	—		Did not advance	
Emir Batur Albayrak	1500 metre freestyle	15:29.69	24	—		Did not advance	
Berkay Ömer Öğretir	100 metre breaststroke	1:00.27	15 Q	1:00.18	15	Did not advance	
Emre Sakçı	50 metre freestyle	23.11	42	Did not advance			
Emre Sakçı	50 metre breaststroke	27.69	17	Did not advance			
Kuzey Tunçelli	800 metre freestyle	7:48.53 NR	12	—		Did not advance	
Kuzey Tunçelli	1500 metre freestyle	14:54.98	8 Q	—		14:59.76	8

Women

Athlete	Event	Heat		Semifinal		Final	
Athlete	Event	Time	Rank	Time	Rank	Time	Rank
Gizem Güvenç	100 metre freestyle	1:02.55	60	Did not advance			
Ela Naz Özdemir	200 metre freestyle	2:01.51	29	Did not advance			
Merve Tuncel	400 metre freestyle	4:14.47	18	—		Did not advance	
Merve Tuncel	800 metre freestyle	8:38.10	13	—		Did not advance	
Ela Naz Özdemir; Gizem Güvenç; Merve Tuncel; Ecem Dönmez	4 × 200 m freestyle relay	8:05.21	12	—		Did not advance	
