= Turkey at the 2022 World Aquatics Championships =

- Flag of Turkey
- FINA code: TUR
- National federation: Turkish Swimming Federation

in Budapest, Hungary
- Competitors: 14 in 3 sports
- Medals: Gold 0 Silver 0 Bronze 0 Total 0

World Aquatics Championships appearances
- 1973; 1975; 1978; 1982; 1986; 1991; 1994; 1998; 2001; 2003; 2005; 2007; 2009; 2011; 2013; 2015; 2017; 2019; 2022; 2023; 2024

Turkey competed at the 2022 World Aquatics Championships in Budapest, Hungary from 18 June to 3 July.

== Artistic swimming ==
Turkey entered 9 artistic swimmers.

Women

| Athlete | Event | Preliminaries | | Final | |
| Athlete | Event | Points | Rank | Points | Rank |
|---|---|---|---|---|---|
| Sude Dicle | Solo technical routine | 66.6667 | 24 | did not advance | |
| Ece Üngör | Solo free routine | 73.7333 | 20 | did not advance | |
| Selin Telci; Ece Üngör | Duet technical routine | 70.1780 | 25 | did not advance | |
| Selin Telci; Ece Üngör | Duet free routine | 70.2333 | 27 | did not advance | |
| Melek Akay; Alara Aker; Sude Dicle; Zeynep Buse Güngör; Cansın Kütüçoğlu; Nil Talu; Selin Telci; Ece Üngör | Team free routine | 69.8667 | 18 | did not advance | |

== Open water swimming ==
Turkey entered 4 open water swimmers (2 male and 2 female)

Men

| Athlete | Event | Time | Rank |
|---|---|---|---|
| Emir Batur Albayrak | 5 km | 56:27.1 | 20 |
| Burhanettin Hacısağır | 5 km | 59:35.2 | 35 |
| Burhanettin Hacısağır | 10 km | 2:01:32.8 | 37 |

Women

| Athlete | Event | Time | Rank |
|---|---|---|---|
| Burcu Naz Narin | 5 km | 1:00:57.4 | 21 |
| Burcu Naz Narin | 10 km | 2:09:11.2 | 33 |
| Sevim Eylül Süpürgeci | 5 km | 1:01:01.2 | 27 |

Mixed

| Athlete | Event | Time | Rank |
|---|---|---|---|
| Burcu Naz Narin; Sevim Eylül Süpürgeci; Burhanettin Hacısağır; Emir Batur Albayrak | Team | 1:07:36.2 | 12 |

== Swimming ==
Turkey entered 2 swimmers.

Men

| Athlete | Event | Heat | | Semifinal | | Final | |
| Athlete | Event | Time | Rank | Time | Rank | Time | Rank |
|---|---|---|---|---|---|---|---|
| Berkay Ömer Öğretir | 100 m breaststroke | 1:00.82 | 19 | did not advance | | | |
| Emre Sakçı | 50 m breaststroke | 27.56 | 13 Q | 27.37 | 10 | did not advance | |
| Emre Sakçı | 50 m butterfly | 24.16 | 40 | did not advance | | | |
