= Turkey at the 2013 World Aquatics Championships =

- Flag of Turkey
- FINA code: TUR
- National federation: Türkiye Yüzme Federasyonu
- Website: www.tyf.gov.tr

in Barcelona, Spain
- Competitors: 14 in 1 sports
- Medals: Gold 0 Silver 0 Bronze 0 Total 0

World Aquatics Championships appearances
- 1973; 1975; 1978; 1982; 1986; 1991; 1994; 1998; 2001; 2003; 2005; 2007; 2009; 2011; 2013; 2015; 2017; 2019; 2022; 2023; 2024

Turkey is competing at the 2013 World Aquatics Championships in Barcelona, Spain between 19 July and 4 August 2013.

== Swimming ==
Turkish swimmers earned qualifying standards in the following events (up to a maximum of 2 swimmers in each event at the A-standard entry time, and 1 at the B-standard):

Men

Athlete	Event	Heat		Semifinal		Final	
Athlete	Event	Time	Rank	Time	Rank	Time	Rank
Demir Atasoy	50 m breaststroke	28.04	32	did not advance			
Demir Atasoy	100 m breaststroke	1:02.01	38	did not advance			
İskender Baslakov	50 m butterfly	24.98	45	did not advance			
Doğa Çelik	200 m freestyle	1:51.79	41	did not advance			
Guven Duvan	50 m backstroke	26.25	25	did not advance			
Guven Duvan	100 m backstroke	56.78	33	did not advance			
Kemal Arda Gürdal	50 m freestyle	22.89	34	did not advance			
Kemal Arda Gürdal	100 m freestyle	49.65	23	did not advance			
Nezır Karap	400 m freestyle	3:57.37	33	—		did not advance	
Nezır Karap	800 m freestyle	8:21.31	32	—		did not advance	
Alpkan Ornek	400 m individual medley	4:28.22	30	—		did not advance	
Ediz Yıldırımer	1500 m freestyle	15:38.46	30	—		did not advance	
Doğa Çelik; İskender Baslakov; Kemal Arda Gürdal; Furkan Marasli	4 × 100 m freestyle relay	3:20.00	12	—		did not advance	
Doğa Çelik; Nezır Karap; Kemal Arda Gürdal; Furkan Marasli	4 × 200 m freestyle relay	7:32.37	16	—		did not advance	
Demir Atasoy; İskender Baslakov; Doğa Çelik; Guven Duvan	4 × 100 m medley relay	3:43.71	19	—		did not advance	

Women

Athlete	Event	Heat		Semifinal		Final	
Athlete	Event	Time	Rank	Time	Rank	Time	Rank
İris Rosenberger	50 m butterfly	27.66	=35	did not advance			
İris Rosenberger	100 m butterfly	1:01.35	33	did not advance			
Hazal Sarıkaya	50 m backstroke	30.15	38	did not advance			
Halime Zeren	100 m backstroke	1:02.91	30	did not advance			
Halime Zeren	200 m backstroke	2:15.48	29	did not advance			
