= Open water swimming at the 2022 World Aquatics Championships – Men's 5 km =

Men's 5 km at the 2022 World Aquatics Championships
- Venue: Lake Lupa
- Location: Hungary
- Dates: 27 June
- Competitors: 61 from 40 nations
- Winning time: 52:48.8

Medalists
gold medal	Florian Wellbrock	Germany
silver medal	Gregorio Paltrinieri	Italy
bronze medal	Mykhailo Romanchuk	Ukraine

The Men's 5 km competition at the 2022 World Aquatics Championships was held on 27 June 2022.

== Results ==
The race was started at 09:00.

Rank	Swimmer	Nationality	Time
1st place, gold medalist(s)	Florian Wellbrock	Germany	52:48.8
2nd place, silver medalist(s)	Gregorio Paltrinieri	Italy	52:52.7
3rd place, bronze medalist(s)	Mykhailo Romanchuk	Ukraine	53:13.9
4	Domenico Acerenza	Italy	53:22.6
5	Marc-Antoine Olivier	France	53:26.0
6	Logan Fontaine	France	53:43.2
7	Dávid Betlehem	Hungary	54:22.0
8	Kyle Lee	Australia	54:28.2
9	Kristóf Rasovszky	Hungary	54:28.3
10	Nicholas Sloman	Australia	54:28.4
10	Brennan Gravley	United States	54:28.4
12	Athanasios Kynigakis	Greece	54:32.8
13	Niklas Frach	Germany	55:25.5
14	Juan Morales	Colombia	56:21.2
15	Simon Lamar	United States	56:21.7
16	Taishin Minamide	Japan	56:22.3
17	Meng Rui	China	56:24.2
18	Kaiki Furuhata	Japan	56:24.6
19	Zhao Junbohang	China	56:26.5
20	Emir Batur Albayrak	Turkey	56:27.1
21	Bruce Almeida	Brazil	56:27.7
22	Gabriel Azevedo	Brazil	56:28.4
23	Jan Hercog	Austria	56:28.7
24	Cho Cheng-chi	Chinese Taipei	56:28.9
24	Ondřej Zach	Czech Republic	56:28.9
26	Dimitrios Markos	Greece	56:30.8
27	Tamaš Farkaš	Serbia	56:30.9
28	Connor Buck	South Africa	56:39.6
29	Ruan Breytenbach	South Africa	57:54.9
30	Juan Alcívar	Ecuador	58:05.3
31	Tomáš Peciar	Slovakia	58:20.4
32	Matěj Kozubek	Czech Republic	58:21.0
33	Alexander Axon	Canada	58:21.5
34	Vitaliy Khudyakov	Kazakhstan	59:14.5
35	Burhanettin Hacısağır	Turkey	59:35.2
36	Lev Cherepanov	Kazakhstan	59:38.2
37	Keith Sin	Hong Kong	59:38.4
38	William Yan Thorley	Hong Kong	59:42.6
39	Cho Pei-chi	Chinese Taipei	59:42.7
40	Arturo Pérez	Mexico	59:43.5
41	Maximiliano Paccot	Uruguay	59:43.6
42	Artyom Lukasevits	Singapore	59:43.6
43	Jeison Rojas	Costa Rica	59:45.4
44	Ritchie Oh	Singapore	59:54.5
45	Kim Min-seok	South Korea	59:59.2
46	Colín Babbitt	Ecuador	1:00:10.8
47	Grgo Mujan	Croatia	1:00:11.7
48	Pedro Pinotes	Angola	1:00:15.0
49	Lee Chang-min	South Korea	1:00:17.9
50	Anton Theo Girlin	Estonia	1:04:57.1
51	Santiago Reyes	Guatemala	1:05:49.2
52	Jaime Arévalo	Bolivia	1:07:42.1
	Army Pal	India	OTL
	Joaquín Devoto	Peru	OTL
	Fernando Nava	Bolivia	OTL
	Diego Ortiz	Puerto Rico	OTL
	Alain Vidot	Seychelles	OTL
	Ousseynou Diop	Senegal	OTL
	Adnan Kabuye	Uganda	OTL
	Yousif Ibrahim	Sudan	OTL
	Jamarr Bruno	Puerto Rico	OTL
	Dilanka Bandisaththamge	Sri Lanka	Did not start
	Paulo Strehlke	Mexico	Did not start
