= Open water swimming at the 2022 World Aquatics Championships – Women's 10 km =

Women's 10 km at the 2022 World Aquatics Championships
- Venue: Lake Lupa
- Location: Hungary
- Dates: 29 June
- Competitors: 61 from 37 nations
- Winning time: 2:02:29.2

Medalists
gold medal	Sharon van Rouwendaal	Netherlands
silver medal	Leonie Beck	Germany
bronze medal	Ana Marcela Cunha	Brazil

The Women's 10 km competition at the 2022 World Aquatics Championships was held on 29 June 2022.

== Results ==
The race was started at 08:00.

Rank	Swimmer	Nationality	Time
1st place, gold medalist(s)	Sharon van Rouwendaal	Netherlands	2:02:29.2
2nd place, silver medalist(s)	Leonie Beck	Germany	2:02:29.7
3rd place, bronze medalist(s)	Ana Marcela Cunha	Brazil	2:02:30.7
4	Aurélie Muller	France	2:02:36.1
5	Katie Grimes	United States	2:02:37.2
6	Anna Olasz	Hungary	2:02:39.1
7	Angélica André	Portugal	2:02:39.3
8	Lea Boy	Germany	2:02:40.5
9	Moesha Johnson	Australia	2:02:42.0
10	María de Valdés	Spain	2:02:42.8
11	Špela Perše	Slovenia	2:02:43.4
12	Mafalda Rosa	Portugal	2:02:48.3
13	Chelsea Gubecka	Australia	2:02:51.7
14	Giulia Gabbrielleschi	Italy	2:02:52.2
15	Mariah Denigan	United States	2:02:54.1
16	Viviane Jungblut	Brazil	2:03:04.9
17	Vivien Balogh	Hungary	2:03:07.8
18	Rachele Bruni	Italy	2:03:17.3
19	Eva Fabian	Israel	2:03:20.2
20	Sun Jiake	China	2:05:23.6
21	Airi Ebina	Japan	2:05:51.7
22	Amica de Jager	South Africa	2:06:00.2
23	Candela Giordanino	Argentina	2:06:02.6
24	Xin Xin	China	2:06:48.0
25	Ángela Martínez	Spain	2:06:50.9
26	Krystyna Panchishko	Ukraine	2:06:52.8
27	Lenka Štěrbová	Czech Republic	2:06:54.0
28	Catherine van Rensburg	South Africa	2:06:54.2
29	Martha Sandoval	Mexico	2:06:54.4
30	Nip Tsz Yin	Hong Kong	2:06:58.2
31	Caroline Jouisse	France	2:07:07.0
32	Nikita Lam	Hong Kong	2:08:00.1
33	Burcu Naz Narin	Turkey	2:09:11.2
34	Katrina Bellio	Canada	2:09:13.2
35	Romina Imwinkelried	Argentina	2:09:14.5
36	Diana Taszhanova	Kazakhstan	2:09:40.7
37	María Bramont-Arias	Peru	2:10:07.6
38	Abby Dunford	Canada	2:10:21.2
39	Teng Yu-wen	Chinese Taipei	2:10:24.9
40	Yumi Tou	Japan	2:10:32.2
41	Paulina Alanis	Mexico	2:10:43.0
42	Arianna Valloni	San Marino	2:10:43.3
43	Lee Hae-rim	South Korea	2:13:08.6
44	Ruby Heath	New Zealand	2:13:44.6
45	Chantal Liew	Singapore	2:14:09.0
46	Fátima Portillo	El Salvador	2:15:24.2
47	Pimpun Choopong	Thailand	2:15:32.4
48	Park Jung-ju	South Korea	2:18:11.9
49	Sofía Guevara	Ecuador	2:18:18.7
50	Jocelyn Bermeo	Ecuador	2:18:21.6
51	Mariia Bondarenko	Ukraine	2:18:41.7
52	Wang Yi-chen	Chinese Taipei	2:19:46.3
53	Samantha Yeo	Singapore	2:20:02.4
54	María Porres	Guatemala	2:24:08.3
55	Leandra Díaz	Puerto Rico	2:24:08.4
56	Alondra Quiles	Puerto Rico	2:26:11.8
57	Natwara Bavornsukseri	Thailand	2:27:59.5
58	Maiza Cardozo	Uruguay	2:31:14.5
	Ashmitha Chandra	India	OTL
	Diana Quirós	Costa Rica	DNF
	Xeniya Romanchuk	Kazakhstan	DNF
