= Open water swimming at the 2022 World Aquatics Championships – Men's 10 km =

Men's 10 km at the 2022 World Aquatics Championships
- Venue: Lake Lupa
- Location: Hungary
- Dates: 29 June
- Competitors: 62 from 39 nations
- Winning time: 1:50:56.8

Medalists
gold medal	Gregorio Paltrinieri	Italy
silver medal	Domenico Acerenza	Italy
bronze medal	Florian Wellbrock	Germany

The Men's 10 km competition at the 2022 World Aquatics Championships was held on 29 June 2022.

== Results ==
The race was started at 12:00.

Rank	Swimmer	Nationality	Time
1st place, gold medalist(s)	Gregorio Paltrinieri	Italy	1:50:56.8
2nd place, silver medalist(s)	Domenico Acerenza	Italy	1:50:58.2
3rd place, bronze medalist(s)	Florian Wellbrock	Germany	1:51:11.2
4	Marc-Antoine Olivier	France	1:51:11.5
5	Dávid Betlehem	Hungary	1:51:29.8
6	Mykhailo Romanchuk	Ukraine	1:51:41.6
7	Niklas Frach	Germany	1:51:45.8
8	Nicholas Sloman	Australia	1:51:58.1
9	Jan Hercog	Austria	1:53:07.9
10	Logan Vanhuys	Belgium	1:53:24.5
11	Hector Pardoe	Great Britain	1:53:41.7
12	Brennan Gravley	United States	1:53:43.4
13	Dylan Gravley	United States	1:53:45.8
14	Alberto Martínez	Spain	1:54:25.0
15	Ondřej Zach	Czech Republic	1:54:27.8
16	Taishin Minamide	Japan	1:54:28.5
17	Hau-Li Fan	Canada	1:54:29.6
18	Joaquín Moreno	Argentina	1:54:30.8
19	Sacha Velly	France	1:54:34.0
20	Tiago Campos	Portugal	1:55:33.5
21	Toby Robinson	Great Britain	1:55:39.2
22	Ruan Breytenbach	South Africa	1:55:40.1
23	Cho Cheng-chi	Chinese Taipei	1:55:54.6
24	Franco Cassini	Argentina	1:55:59.7
25	Bruce Almeida	Brazil	1:56:09.0
26	Eric Brown	Canada	1:56:15.0
27	Diogo Cardoso	Portugal	1:56:18.4
27	Tamaš Farkaš	Serbia	1:57:19.2
29	Taiki Nonaka	Japan	1:58:42.5
30	Daniel Delgadillo	Mexico	1:59:28.0
31	Connor Buck	South Africa	1:59:42.6
32	Bailey Armstrong	Australia	2:00:02.7
33	Zhang Ziyang	China	2:00:54.7
34	Krzysztof Chmielewski	Poland	2:00:54.9
35	Tang Haoyang	China	2:01:20.4
36	Park Jae-hun	South Korea	2:01:21.3
37	Burhanettin Hacısağır	Turkey	2:01:32.8
38	William Yan Thorley	Hong Kong	2:01:32.9
39	Juan Alcívar	Ecuador	2:01:37.4
40	Ido Gal	Israel	2:01:38.9
41	Choi Yong-jin	South Korea	2:01:50.1
42	Keith Sin	Hong Kong	2:02:08.1
43	Artyom Lukasevits	Singapore	2:02:29.2
44	Tanakrit Kittiya	Thailand	2:03:05.6
45	Anurag Singh	India	2:03:16.4
46	Jahir López	Ecuador	2:03:23.2
47	Paulo Strehlke	Mexico	2:04:04.3
48	Maximiliano Paccot	Uruguay	2:05:01.3
49	Jeison Rojas	Costa Rica	2:05:01.4
50	Cho Pei-chi	Chinese Taipei	2:05:24.0
51	Lev Cherepanov	Kazakhstan	2:08:15.0
52	Ritchie Oh	Singapore	2:08:26.5
53	Joaquín Devoto	Peru	2:09:41.4
54	Jamarr Bruno	Puerto Rico	2:10:35.0
55	Damien Payet	Seychelles	2:13:54.9
56	Suabsakul Kumton	Thailand	2:17:49.7
57	Diego Ortiz	Puerto Rico	2:18:44.0
58	Santiago Reyes	Guatemala	2:20:53.1
–	Guilherme Costa	Brazil	Did not finish
–	Kristóf Rasovszky	Hungary	Did not finish
–	Asterios Daldogiannis	Greece	Did not finish
–	Matěj Kozubek	Czech Republic	Did not finish
–	Athanasios Kynigakis	Greece	Did not start
–	Matan Roditi	Israel	Did not start
