= Singapore at the 2022 World Aquatics Championships =

- Flag of Singapore
- FINA code: SGP
- National federation: Singapore Swimming Federation
- Website: singaporeswimming.org

in Budapest, Hungary
- Competitors: 30 in 3 sports
- Medals: Gold 0 Silver 0 Bronze 0 Total 0

World Aquatics Championships appearances
- 1973; 1975; 1978; 1982; 1986; 1991; 1994; 1998; 2001; 2003; 2005; 2007; 2009; 2011; 2013; 2015; 2017; 2019; 2022; 2023; 2024

Singapore competed at the 2022 World Aquatics Championships in Budapest, Hungary from 18 June to 3 July.

== Artistic swimming ==
Singapore entered 11 artistic swimmers.

Women

Athlete	Event	Preliminaries		Final	
Athlete	Event	Points	Rank	Points	Rank
Debbie Soh; Miya Yong	Duet technical routine	78.4116	16	did not advance	
Debbie Soh; Miya Yong	Duet free routine	DNS		did not advance	
Ong Rae-Anne; Eleanor Quah; Posh Soh; Royce Soh; Vivien Tai; Claire Tan; Isabelle Tang; Sandra Tay	Team technical routine	74.1444	16	did not advance	
Eleanor Quah; Posh Soh; Royce Soh; Vivien Tai; Caitlyn Tan; Claire Tan; Isabelle Tang; Sandra Tay	Team free routine	75.4333	16	did not advance	

== Open water swimming ==
Singapore entered 5 open water swimmers (2 male and 3 female)

Men

Athlete	Event	Time	Rank
Artyom Lukasevits	5 km	59:43.6	42
Artyom Lukasevits	10 km	2:02:29.2	43
Ritchie Oh	5 km	59:54.5	44
Ritchie Oh	10 km	2:08:26.5	52

Women

Athlete	Event	Time	Rank
Candice Ang	5 km	1:07:56.3	46
Chantal Liew	5 km	1:05:28.8	42
Chantal Liew	10 km	2:14:09.0	45
Samantha Yeo	10 km	2:20:02.4	53

Mixed

Athlete	Event	Time	Rank
Ritchie Oh; Chantal Liew; Samantha Yeo; Artyom Lukasevits	Team	1:12:16.8	18

== Swimming ==
Singapore entered 14 swimmers.

Men

Athlete	Event	Heat		Semifinal		Final	
Athlete	Event	Time	Rank	Time	Rank	Time	Rank
Jonathan Tan	50 metre freestyle	22.51	30	did not advance			
Jonathan Tan	100 metre freestyle	50.01	41	did not advance			
Glen Lim Jun Wei	200 metre freestyle	1:49.94	35	did not advance			
Glen Lim Jun Wei	400 metre freestyle	3:54.63	27	did not advance			
Quah Zheng Wen	50 metre backstroke	25.79	26	did not advance			
Quah Zheng Wen	100 metre backstroke	55.76	29	did not advance			
Nicholas Mahabir	50 metre breaststroke	28.11	25	did not advance			
Maximillian Wei Ang	100 metre breaststroke	1:01.76	27	did not advance			
Maximillian Wei Ang	200 metre breaststroke	2:14.14	25	did not advance			
Maximillian Wei Ang	200 metre individual medley	2:02.94	26	did not advance			
Teong Tzen Wei	50 metre butterfly	23.51	14 Q	23.03	7 Q	23.29	8
Teong Tzen Wei	50 metre butterfly	DSQ		did not advance			
Ong Jung Yi	200 metre butterfly	2:00.18	28	did not advance			
Quah Zheng Wen; Jonathan Tan; Mikkel Lee; Darren Chua	4 × 100 metre freestyle relay	3:18.76	14	—		did not advance	
Glen Lim Jun Wei; Ardi Mohamed Azman; Jonathan Tan; Quah Zheng Wen	4 × 200 metre freestyle relay	7:20.31	12	—		did not advance	

Women

Athlete	Event	Heat		Semifinal		Final	
Athlete	Event	Time	Rank	Time	Rank	Time	Rank
Amanda Lim	50 metre freestyle	25.85	22	did not advance			
400 metre freestyle	4:15.19	23	did not advance				
Gan Ching Hwee	200 metre freestyle	DNS		did not advance			
Gan Ching Hwee	400 metre freestyle	4:15.19	23	did not advance			
Gan Ching Hwee	800 metre freestyle	DNS		—		did not advance	
Gan Ching Hwee	1500 metre freestyle	16:32.43	14	did not advance			
En Yi Letitia Sim	50 metre breaststroke	31.92	27	did not advance			
En Yi Letitia Sim	100 metre breaststroke	1:08.59	22	did not advance			
En Yi Letitia Sim	200 metre breaststroke	2:31.31	24	did not advance			
En Yi Letitia Sim	200 metre individual medley	2:16.30	23	did not advance			
Quah Jing Wen	50 metre butterfly	26.95	26	did not advance			
Quah Jing Wen	100 metre butterfly	59.29	15 Q	59.42	16	did not advance	
Quah Jing Wen	200 metre butterfly	2:11.79	17	did not advance			

Mixed

Athlete	Event	Heat		Final	
Athlete	Event	Time	Rank	Time	Rank
Jonathan Tan; Ardi Mohamed Azman; Quah Jing Wen; Amanda Lim	4 × 100 metre mixed freestyle relay	3:33.13	13	did not advance	
Quah Zheng Wen; Nicholas Mahabir; En Yi Letitia Sim; Amanda Lim	4 × 100 metre mixed medley relay	3:54.43	14	did not advance	
