= Ecuador at the 2022 World Aquatics Championships =

- Flag of Ecuador
- FINA code: ECU
- National federation: Ecuadorian Swimming Federation
- Website: fena-ecuador.org (in Spanish)

in Budapest, Hungary
- Competitors: 7 in 2 sports
- Medals: Gold 0 Silver 0 Bronze 0 Total 0

World Aquatics Championships appearances
- 1973; 1975; 1978; 1982; 1986; 1991; 1994; 1998; 2001; 2003; 2005; 2007; 2009; 2011; 2013; 2015; 2017; 2019; 2022; 2023; 2024

Ecuador competed at the 2022 World Aquatics Championships in Budapest, Hungary from 17 June to 3 July.

== Open water swimming ==
Ecuador qualified three male and three female open water swimmers.

Men

Athlete	Event	Time	Rank
Juan Alcívar	Men's 5 km	58:05.3	30
Juan Alcívar	Men's 10 km	2:01:37.4	39
Colín Babbitt	Men's 5 km	1:00:10.8	46
Jahir López	Men's 10 km	2:03:23.2	46

Women

Athlete	Event	Time	Rank
Isabella Babbitt	Women's 5 km	1:04:59.3	38
Jocelyn Bermeo	Women's 10 km	2:18:21.6	50
Sofía Guevara	Women's 5 km	1:07:56.6	47
Sofía Guevara	Women's 10 km	2:18:18.7	49

Mixed

Athlete	Event	Time	Rank
Juan Alcívar; Isabella Babbitt; Jocelyn Bermeo; Jahir López	Team	1:11:32.2	17

== Swimming ==
Ecuador entered two swimmers.

Men

Athlete	Event	Heat		Semifinal		Final	
Athlete	Event	Time	Rank	Time	Rank	Time	Rank
Jahir López	1500 m freestyle	16:57.92	23	—		did not advance	

Women

Athlete	Event	Heat		Semifinal		Final	
Athlete	Event	Time	Rank	Time	Rank	Time	Rank
Anicka Delgado	50 m freestyle	26.18	31	did not advance			
Anicka Delgado	100 m freestyle	56.43	27	did not advance			
Anicka Delgado	50 m butterfly	27.12	28	did not advance			
