= Australia at the 2022 World Aquatics Championships =

- Flag of Australia
- World Aquatics code: AUS
- National federation: Swimming Australia
- Website: swimming.org.au

in Budapest, Hungary
- Competitors: 88 in 5 sports
- Medals Ranked 4th: Gold 6 Silver 9 Bronze 4 Total 19

World Aquatics Championships appearances
- 1973; 1975; 1978; 1982; 1986; 1991; 1994; 1998; 2001; 2003; 2005; 2007; 2009; 2011; 2013; 2015; 2017; 2019; 2022; 2023; 2024; 2025

Australia competed at the 2022 World Aquatics Championships in Budapest, Hungary from 17 June to 3 July.

== Medalists ==
Medal	Name	Sport	Event	Date
Gold	Elijah Winnington	Swimming	Men's 400 metre freestyle	18 June
Gold	Mollie O'Callaghan; Madison Wilson; Meg Harris; Shayna Jack; Leah Neale*; Brianna Throssell*	Swimming	Women's 4 x 100 metre freestyle relay	18 June
Gold	Mollie O'Callaghan	Swimming	Women's 100 metre freestyle	23 June
Gold	Zac Stubblety-Cook	Swimming	Men's 200 metre breaststroke	23 June
Gold	Kaylee McKeown	Swimming	Women's 200 metre backstroke	24 June
Gold	Jack Cartwright; Kyle Chalmers; Madison Wilson; Mollie O'Callaghan; Zac Incerti*; William Yang*; Meg Harris*; Leah Neale*	Swimming	4 × 100 metre mixed freestyle relay	24 June
Silver	William Yang; Matthew Temple; Jack Cartwright; Kyle Chalmers	Swimming	Men's 4 x 100 metre freestyle relay	18 June
Silver	Kaylee McKeown	Swimming	Women's 200 metre individual medley	19 June
Silver	Mollie O'Callaghan	Swimming	Women's 200 metre freestyle	21 June
Silver	Kaylee McKeown; Zac Stubblety-Cook; Matthew Temple; Shayna Jack; Isaac Cooper*; Matthew Wilson*; Brianna Throssell*; Meg Harris*	Swimming	4 x 100 metre mixed medley relay	21 June
Silver	Madison Wilson; Leah Neale; Kiah Melverton; Mollie O'Callaghan; Lani Pallister*; Brianna Throssell*	Swimming	Women's 4 x 200 metre freestyle relay	22 June
Silver	Jenna Strauch	Swimming	Women's 200 metre breaststroke	23 June
Silver	Elijah Winnington; Zac Incerti; Samuel Short; Mack Horton; Brendon Smith*	Swimming	Men's 4 x 200 metre freestyle relay	23 June
Silver	Kiah Melverton	Swimming	Women's 800 metre freestyle	24 June
Silver	Kaylee McKeown; Jenna Strauch; Brianna Throssell; Mollie O'Callaghan; Madison Wilson*	Swimming	Women's 4 x 100 metre medley relay	25 June
Bronze	Lani Pallister	Swimming	Women's 1500 metre freestyle	20 June
Bronze	Meg Harris	Swimming	Women's 50 metre freestyle	25 June
Bronze	Li Shixin	Diving	Men's 1 metre springboard	30 June
Bronze	Maddison Keeney; Anabelle Smith	Diving	Women's synchronized 3 metre springboard	3 July

== Artistic swimming ==
Australia's artistic swimming team consisted of 12 athletes (12 female).

Women

Athlete	Event	Preliminaries		Final	
Athlete	Event	Points	Rank	Points	Rank
Zoe Poulis; Bianca Chira (R)	Solo free routine	72.433	21	did not advance	
Georgia Courage-Gardiner; Milena Waldmann; Tara bennet (R); Pam Kurosawa (R); Zoe Poulis (R)	Duet free routine	69.6770	26	did not advance	
Tara bennet Natalia Caloiero; Bianca Chira; Georgia Courage-Gardiner; Marnie Kennedy; Pam Kurosawa; Zoe Poulis; Milena Waldmann; Amelia Carle (R); Bianca Chira (R); Maria Nadezhdina (R)	Team technical routine	70.5530	17	did not advance	
Tara bennet Natalia Caloiero; Amelia Carle; Georgia Courage-Gardiner; Adelle Griffiths; Marnie Kennedy; Pam Kurosawa; Maria Nadezhdina; Zoe Poulis; Milena Waldmann; Bianca Chira (R); Chantelle Wheatley (R)	Highlight routine	72.9667	13	did not advance	

Legend: (R) = Reserve Athlete

== Diving ==
Australia entered 13 divers.

Men

Athlete	Event	Preliminaries		Semifinals		Final	
Athlete	Event	Points	Rank	Points	Rank	Points	Rank
Li Shixin	1 m springboard	364.95	7 Q	—N/a		395.40	3rd place, bronze medalist(s)
Li Shixin	3 m springboard	334.90	32	did not advance			
Sam Fricker	3 m springboard	347.30	28	did not advance			
Sam Fricker	10 m platform	373.45	13 Q	418.25	10 Q	391.15	10
Cassiel Rousseau	10 m platform	424.85	6 Q	442.90	6 Q	481.15	4
Domonic Bedggood; Cassiel Rousseau	10 m synchronized platform	376.65	5 Q	—N/a		368.10	7

Women

Athlete	Event	Preliminaries		Semifinals		Final	
Athlete	Event	Points	Rank	Points	Rank	Points	Rank
Esther Qin	1 m springboard	243.20	14	—N/a		did not advance	
Georgia Sheehan	1 m springboard	252.90	6 Q	—N/a		260.95	5
Georgia Sheehan	3 m springboard	241.70	22	did not advance			
Brittany O'Brien	3 m springboard	233.70	27	did not advance			
Emily Boyd	10 m platform	280.60	14 Q	284.70	12 Q	294.10	8
Nikita Hains	10 m platform	270.40	18 Q	314.80	6 Q	270.60	10
Maddison Keeney; Anabelle Smith	3 m synchronized springboard	287.04	2 Q	—N/a		294.12	3rd place, bronze medalist(s)
Charli Petrov; Melissa Wu	10 m synchronized platform	264.48	9 Q	—N/a		274.68	7

Mixed

Athlete	Event	Final	
Athlete	Event	Points	Rank
Samuel Fricker; Charlie Petrov	Team	318.45	9
Domonic Bedggood; Melissa Wu	10 m synchronized platform	243.12	9

== Open water swimming ==
Australia qualified three male and three female open water swimmers.

Men

Athlete	Event	Time	Rank
Bailey Armstrong	Men's 10 km	2:00:02.70	32
Bailey Armstrong	Men's 25 km	5:09:40.30	16
Kyle Lee	Men's 5 km	54:28.20	8
Kyle Lee	Men's 25 km	5:02:48.50	5
Nicholas Sloman	Men's 5 km	54:28.40	10
Nicholas Sloman	Men's 10 km	1:51:58.10	8

Women

Athlete	Event	Time	Rank
Finella Gibbs-Beal	Women's 5 km	1:01:01.20	26
Chelsea Gubecka	Women's 10 km	2:02:51.70	13
Moesha Johnson	Women's 5 km	58:02.50	8
Moesha Johnson	Women's 10 km	2:02:42.00	9

Mixed

Athlete	Event	Time	Rank
Moesha Johnson; Chelsea Gubecka; Nicholas Sloman; Bailey Armstrong	Team	1:05:30.80	6

== Swimming ==
Australia entered 35 swimmers.

Men

Athlete	Event	Heat		Semifinal		Final	
Athlete	Event	Time	Rank	Time	Rank	Time	Rank
Grayson Bell	50 m freestyle	22.69	40	did not advance			
Grayson Bell	50 m breaststroke	27.91	22	did not advance			
Kyle Chalmers	50 metre butterfly	did not start		did not advance			
Kyle Chalmers	100 m butterfly	52.70	22	did not advance			
Isaac Cooper	50 m backstroke	24.67	6 Q	24.60	7 Q	24.76	7
Isaac Cooper	100 m backstroke	53.87	14 Q	53.55	12	did not advance	
Joshua Edwards-Smith	200 m backstroke	1:56.85	2 Q	1:57.52	11	did not advance	
Bowen Gough	200 m butterfly	1:58.66	24	did not advance			
Mack Horton	400 m freestyle	3:46.57	9	—N/a		did not advance	
Zac Incerti	100 m freestyle	48.61	17	did not advance			
Zac Incerti	200 m freestyle	1:49.12	32	did not advance			
Mitch Larkin	50 m backstroke	25.47	21	did not advance			
Mitch Larkin	100 m backstroke	53.77	11 Q	53.73	13	did not advance	
Mitch Larkin	200 m backstroke	1:58.58	11 Q	1:57.36	9	did not advance	
Se-Bom Lee	200 m individual medley	1:59.37	12 Q	2:00.11	14	did not advance	
Se-Bom Lee	400 m individual medley	4:16.40	13	—N/a		did not advance	
Thomas Patrick Nowakowski	50 m freestyle	22.45	25	did not advance			
Samuel Short	800 m freestyle	7:48.28	9	—N/a		did not advance	
Samuel Short	1500 m freestyle	15:10.14	14	—N/a		did not advance	
Brendon Smith	200 m individual medley	2:01.32	22	did not advance			
Brendon Smith	400 m individual medley	4:12.50	8 Q	—N/a		4:11.36	5
Zac Stubblety-Cook	100 m breaststroke	1:00.12	10 Q	59.51	7 Q	59.65	7
Zac Stubblety-Cook	200 m breastroke	2:09.09	1 Q	2:06.72	1 Q	2:07.07	1st place, gold medalist(s)
Matthew Temple	100 m butterfly	51.86	12 Q	51.24	6 Q	51.15	5
Matthew Wilson	200 m breaststroke	2:11.89	16 Q	2:11.44	15	did not advance	
Elijah Winnington	200 m freestyle	1:46.19	6 Q	1:45.53	5 Q	1:45.82	8
Elijah Winnington	400 m freestyle	3:44.42	2 Q	—N/a		3:41.22	1st place, gold medalist(s)
Elijah Winnington	800 m freestyle	did not start		—N/a		did not advance	
William Yang	100 m freestyle	48.87	24	did not advance			
William Yang; Matthew Temple; Jack Cartwright; Kyle Chalmers	4 × 100 m freestyle relay	3:11.97	2 Q	—N/a		3:10.88	2nd place, silver medalist(s)
Elijah Winnington; Zac Incerti; Samuel Short; Mack Horton; Brendon Smith*	4 × 200 m freestyle relay	7:09.98	8 Q	—N/a		7:03.50	2nd place, silver medalist(s)
Isaac Cooper; Zac Stubblety-Cook; Matthew Temple; Kyle Chalmers; Mitch Larkin*; Jack Cartwright*	4 × 100 m medley relay	3:33.20	4 Q	—N/a		3:31.81	4

Women

Athlete	Event	Heat		Semifinal		Final	
Athlete	Event	Time	Rank	Time	Rank	Time	Rank
Abbey Connor	200 m butterfly	2:10.10	11 Q	2:09.88	12	did not advance	
Elizabeth Dekkers	200 m butterfly	2:08.98	4 Q	2:07.77	6 Q	2:07.01	5
Jenna Forrester	400 m individual medley	4:40.20	7 Q	—N/a		4:42.39	7
Abbey Harkin	100 m breaststroke	1:08.12	19	did not advance			
Abbey Harkin	200 m breaststroke	2:27.44	13 Q	2:26.28	13	did not advance	
Meg Harris	50 m freestyle	24.68	3 Q	24.39	3 Q	24.38	3rd place, bronze medalist(s)
Shayna Jack	50 m freestyle	did not start		did not advance			
Shayna Jack	100 m freestyle	did not start		did not advance			
Moesha Johnson	1500 m freestyle	15:57.77	5 Q	—N/a		15:55.75	4
Kaylee McKeown	50 m backstroke	27.94	8 Q	27.58	6 Q	27.47	5
Kaylee McKeown	100 m backstroke	did not start		did not advance			
Kaylee McKeown	200 m backstroke	2:09.26	5 Q	2:06.41	2 Q	2:05.08	1st place, gold medalist(s)
Kaylee McKeown	200 m individual medley	2:11.17	7 Q	2:10.17	3 Q	2:08.57	2nd place, silver medalist(s)
Kiah Melverton	400 m freestyle	4:03.74	4 Q	—N/a		4:05.62	7
Kiah Melverton	800 m freestyle	8:30.68	8 Q	—N/a		8:18.77	2nd place, silver medalist(s)
Mollie O'Callaghan	100 m freestyle	53.49	1 Q	52.85	1 Q	52.67	1st place, gold medalist(s)
Mollie O'Callaghan	200 m freestyle	1:57.28	5 Q	1:56.34	3 Q	1:55.22	2nd place, silver medalist(s)
Lani Pallister	400 m freestyle	4:03.71	3 Q	—N/a		4:02.16	4
Lani Pallister	800 m freestyle	8:24.66	2 Q	—N/a		did not Start	
Lani Pallister	1500 m freestyle	15:57.61	4 Q	—N/a		15:48.96	3rd place, bronze medalist(s)
Ella Ramsey	200 m individual medley	2:13.20	16 Q	2:13.10	15	did not advance	
Jenna Strauch	50 m breaststroke	30.93	14 Q	30.99	15	did not advance	
Jenna Strauch	100 m breaststroke	1:06.16	2 Q	1:06.49	10	did not advance	
Jenna Strauch	200 m breaststroke	2:25.56	6 Q	2:22.22	1 Q	2:23.04	2nd place, silver medalist(s)
Brianna Throssell	50 m butterfly	26.26	12 Q	26.05	11	did not advance	
Brianna Throssell	100 m butterfly	57.85	7 Q	56.96	4 Q	56.98	6
Madison Wilson	200 m freestyle	1:56.85	2 Q	1:56.31	2 Q	1:56.85	5
Mollie O'Callaghan; Madison Wilson; Meg Harris; Shayna Jack; Leah Neale*; Brianna Throssell*	4 × 100 m freestyle relay	3:33.74	1 Q	—N/a		3:30.95	1st place, gold medalist(s)
Madison Wilson; Leah Neale; Kiah Melverton; Mollie O'Callaghan; Lani Pallister*; Brianna Throssell*	4 × 200 m freestyle relay	7:47.61	1 Q	—N/a		7:43.86	2nd place, silver medalist(s)
Kaylee McKeown; Jenna Strauch; Brianna Throssell; Mollie O'Callaghan; Madison Wilson*	4 × 100 m medley relay	3:56.77	1 Q	—N/a		3:54.25	2nd place, silver medalist(s)

Mixed

Athlete	Event	Heat		Final	
Athlete	Event	Time	Rank	Time	Rank
Jack Cartwright; Kyle Chalmers; Madison Wilson; Mollie O'Callaghan; Zac Incerti*; William Yang*; Meg Harris*; Leah Neale*	4 × 100 m freestyle relay	3:25.55	3 Q	3:19.38 WR	1st place, gold medalist(s)
Kaylee McKeown; Zac Stubblety-Cook; Matthew Temple; Shayna Jack; Isaac Cooper*; Matthew Wilson*; Brianna Throssell*; Meg Harris*	4 × 100 m medley relay	3:44.58	4 Q	3:41.34	2nd place, silver medalist(s)

Legend: (*) = Swimmers who participated in the heat only.

== Water polo ==
Summary

Team	Event	Group stage				Playoff	Quarterfinal	Semifinal	Final / BM	
Team	Event	Opposition Score	Opposition Score	Opposition Score	Rank	Opposition Score	Opposition Score	Opposition Score	Opposition Score	Rank
Australia	Men's tournament	Kazakhstan; W 10–4	Serbia; L 5–6	United States; L 9–13	3 P/Off	Italy; L 6–17	—N/a	Japan; L 7–15	South Africa; W 19–4	11
Australia	Women's tournament	Kazakhstan; W 19–6	New Zealand; W 11–2	Brazil; W 17–5	1 QF	—N/a	Hungary; L 6–7	Greece; W 16–14	Spain; L 5–8	6

=== Men's tournament ===
Team roster

The following is Australian roster in the Water polo at the 2022 World Aquatics Championships – Men's tournament.

Head coach: Tim Hamill

- 1 Nick Porter GK
- 2 Keenan Marsden D
- 3 George Ford CB
- 4 Charlie Negus D
- 5 Nathan Power CB
- 6 Tom McJannett CF
- 7 Luke Pavillard D
- 8 Rhys Holden D
- 9 Reilly Townsend D
- 10 Timothy Putt CB
- 11 Chaz Poot D
- 12 Blake Edwards D
- 13 John Hedges GK

Group play

Pos	Team	Pld	W	D	L	GF	GA	GD	Pts	Qualification
1	Serbia	3	3	0	0	45	21	+24	6	Quarterfinals
2	United States	3	2	0	1	44	30	+14	4	Playoffs
3	Australia	3	1	0	2	24	24	0	2	Playoffs
4	Kazakhstan	3	0	0	3	11	49	−38	0	

Source: Sportresult
Rules for classification: 1) points; 2) head-to-head points; 3) head-to-head goal difference; 4) head-to-head number of goals scored; 5) Goal difference.

21 June 2022; 18:00	Report	Australia	10–4	Kazakhstan	Szeged Tiszavirág Pool, Szeged; Referees: Levan Berishvili (GEO), Veselin Mišković (MNE)
21 June 2022; 18:00	Report	Score by quarters: 1–0, 3–0, 3–2, 3–2			Szeged Tiszavirág Pool, Szeged; Referees: Levan Berishvili (GEO), Veselin Mišković (MNE)
21 June 2022; 18:00	Report	Pavillard, Power 3	Goals	Shmider 3	Szeged Tiszavirág Pool, Szeged; Referees: Levan Berishvili (GEO), Veselin Mišković (MNE)

23 June 2022; 18:00	Report	Serbia	6–5	Australia	Szeged Tiszavirág Pool, Szeged; Referees: Raffaele Colombo (ITA), David Gómez (ESP)
23 June 2022; 18:00	Report	Score by quarters: 1–1, 2–2, 2–2, 1–0			Szeged Tiszavirág Pool, Szeged; Referees: Raffaele Colombo (ITA), David Gómez (ESP)
23 June 2022; 18:00	Report	Lukić, Mandić 2	Goals	Edwards, Power 2	Szeged Tiszavirág Pool, Szeged; Referees: Raffaele Colombo (ITA), David Gómez (ESP)

25 June 2022; 19:30	Report	United States	14–9	Australia	Szeged Tiszavirág Pool, Szeged; Referees: Levan Berishvili (GEO), Veselin Mišković (MNE)
25 June 2022; 19:30	Report	Score by quarters: 4–2, 4–2, 4–3, 2–2			Szeged Tiszavirág Pool, Szeged; Referees: Levan Berishvili (GEO), Veselin Mišković (MNE)
25 June 2022; 19:30	Report	Irving 4	Goals	three players 2	Szeged Tiszavirág Pool, Szeged; Referees: Levan Berishvili (GEO), Veselin Mišković (MNE)

Playoffs

27 June 2022; 17:00	Report	Italy	17–6	Australia	Alfréd Hajós National Swimming Stadium, Budapest; Referees: Frank Ohme (GER), Georgios Stavridis (GRE)
27 June 2022; 17:00	Report	Score by quarters: 4–0, 3–3, 4–1, 6–2			Alfréd Hajós National Swimming Stadium, Budapest; Referees: Frank Ohme (GER), Georgios Stavridis (GRE)
27 June 2022; 17:00	Report	Cannella, Del Lungo 3	Goals	Edwards 3	Alfréd Hajós National Swimming Stadium, Budapest; Referees: Frank Ohme (GER), Georgios Stavridis (GRE)

9th-12th place semifinal

29 June 2022; 17:00	Report	Japan	15–7	Australia	Szeged Tiszavirág Pool, Szeged; Referees: Ivan Raković (SRB), Veselin Mišković (MNE)
29 June 2022; 17:00	Report	Score by quarters: 2–2, 5–2, 5–2, 3–1			Szeged Tiszavirág Pool, Szeged; Referees: Ivan Raković (SRB), Veselin Mišković (MNE)
29 June 2022; 17:00	Report	Date 4	Goals	seven players 1	Szeged Tiszavirág Pool, Szeged; Referees: Ivan Raković (SRB), Veselin Mišković (MNE)

Eleventh place game

1 July 2022; 17:00	Report	Australia	19–4	South Africa	Szeged Tiszavirág Pool, Szeged; Referees: Levan Berishvili (GEO), Agustin Pinski (ARG)
1 July 2022; 17:00	Report	Score by quarters: 3–2, 6–0, 4–1, 6–1			Szeged Tiszavirág Pool, Szeged; Referees: Levan Berishvili (GEO), Agustin Pinski (ARG)
1 July 2022; 17:00	Report	Pavillard 5	Goals	Swanepoel 2	Szeged Tiszavirág Pool, Szeged; Referees: Levan Berishvili (GEO), Agustin Pinski (ARG)

=== Women's tournament ===
Team roster

The following is Australian roster in the Water polo at the 2022 World Aquatics Championships – Women's tournament.

Head coach: Paul Oberman

- 1 Gabriella Palm GK
- 2 Pascalle Casey D
- 3 Tenealle Fasala CF
- 4 Bronte Halligan D
- 5 Bridget Leeson-Smith D
- 6 Abby Andrews D
- 7 Charlize Andrews D
- 8 Amy Ridge CB
- 9 Zoe Arancini D
- 10 Lena Mihailovic D
- 11 Matilda Kearns CB
- 12 Hayley Ballesty CB
- 13 Genevieve Longman GK

Group play

Pos	Team	Pld	W	D	L	GF	GA	GD	Pts	Qualification
1	Australia	3	3	0	0	47	13	+34	6	Quarterfinals
2	New Zealand	3	2	0	1	29	30	−1	4	Playoffs
3	Kazakhstan	3	1	0	2	27	40	−13	2	Playoffs
4	Brazil	3	0	0	3	19	39	−20	0	

Source: Sportresult
Rules for classification: 1) points; 2) head-to-head points; 3) head-to-head goal difference; 4) head-to-head number of goals scored; 5) Goal difference.

20 June 2022; 19:30	Report	Kazakhstan	6–19	Australia	Sopron Lőver Pool, Sopron; Referees: György Kun (HUN), Chisato Kurosaki (JPN)
20 June 2022; 19:30	Report	Score by quarters: 1–6, 1–9, 3–3, 1–1			Sopron Lőver Pool, Sopron; Referees: György Kun (HUN), Chisato Kurosaki (JPN)
20 June 2022; 19:30	Report	Yeremina 3	Goals	Arancini 5	Sopron Lőver Pool, Sopron; Referees: György Kun (HUN), Chisato Kurosaki (JPN)

22 June 2022; 18:00	Report	Australia	11–2	New Zealand	Sopron Lőver Pool, Sopron; Referees: Asumi Tsuzaki (JPN), Agustin Pinski (ARG)
22 June 2022; 18:00	Report	Score by quarters: 3–1, 4–1, 3–0, 1–0			Sopron Lőver Pool, Sopron; Referees: Asumi Tsuzaki (JPN), Agustin Pinski (ARG)
22 June 2022; 18:00	Report	Halligan 3	Goals	McDowall, Nicholson 1	Sopron Lőver Pool, Sopron; Referees: Asumi Tsuzaki (JPN), Agustin Pinski (ARG)

24 June 2022; 18:00	Report	Brazil	5–17	Australia	Sopron Lőver Pool, Sopron; Referees: György Kun (HUN), Asumi Tsuzaki (JPN)
24 June 2022; 18:00	Report	Score by quarters: 1–5, 0–4, 1–5, 3–3			Sopron Lőver Pool, Sopron; Referees: György Kun (HUN), Asumi Tsuzaki (JPN)
24 June 2022; 18:00	Report	Belorio 2	Goals	Halligan 5	Sopron Lőver Pool, Sopron; Referees: György Kun (HUN), Asumi Tsuzaki (JPN)

Quarterfinals

28 June 2022; 21:00	Report	Australia	6–7	Hungary	Alfréd Hajós National Swimming Stadium, Budapest; Referees: Michael Goldenberg (USA), Raffaele Colombo (ITA)
28 June 2022; 21:00	Report	Score by quarters: 3–2, 0–1, 0–2, 3–2			Alfréd Hajós National Swimming Stadium, Budapest; Referees: Michael Goldenberg (USA), Raffaele Colombo (ITA)
28 June 2022; 21:00	Report	Halligan 3	Goals	Keszthelyi 3	Alfréd Hajós National Swimming Stadium, Budapest; Referees: Michael Goldenberg (USA), Raffaele Colombo (ITA)

5th–8tth place semifinal

30 June 2022; 19:30	Report	Australia	16–14 (PSO)	Greece	Alfréd Hajós National Swimming Stadium, Budapest; Referees: Raffaele Colombo (ITA), György Kun (HUN)
30 June 2022; 19:30	Report	Score by quarters: 2–2, 4–2, 4–4, 2–4 PSO: 4–2			Alfréd Hajós National Swimming Stadium, Budapest; Referees: Raffaele Colombo (ITA), György Kun (HUN)
30 June 2022; 19:30	Report	Leeson-Smith, Ridge 3	Goals	Xenaki 4	Alfréd Hajós National Swimming Stadium, Budapest; Referees: Raffaele Colombo (ITA), György Kun (HUN)

Fifth place game

2 July 2022; 17:00	Report	Spain	8–5	Australia	Alfréd Hajós National Swimming Stadium, Budapest; Referees: Helene Painchaud (CAN), Ivan Raković (SRB)
2 July 2022; 17:00	Report	Score by quarters: 2–0, 1–1, 3–1, 2–3			Alfréd Hajós National Swimming Stadium, Budapest; Referees: Helene Painchaud (CAN), Ivan Raković (SRB)
2 July 2022; 17:00	Report	three players 2	Goals	five players 1	Alfréd Hajós National Swimming Stadium, Budapest; Referees: Helene Painchaud (CAN), Ivan Raković (SRB)
