= South Africa at the 2022 World Aquatics Championships =

- Flag of South Africa
- FINA code: RSA
- National federation: Swimming South Africa

in Budapest, Hungary
- Competitors: 46 in 5 sports
- Medals Ranked 23rd: Gold 0 Silver 0 Bronze 1 Total 1

World Aquatics Championships appearances
- 1973; 1975; 1978; 1982; 1986; 1991; 1994; 1998; 2001; 2003; 2005; 2007; 2009; 2011; 2013; 2015; 2017; 2019; 2022; 2023; 2024

South Africa competed at the 2022 World Aquatics Championships in Budapest, Hungary from 18 June to 3 July.

== Medalists ==
Medal	Name	Sport	Event	Date
Bronze	Lara van Niekerk	Swimming	Women's 50 metre breaststroke	25 June

== Artistic swimming ==
South Africa entered 4 artistic swimmers.

Women

Athlete	Event	Preliminaries		Final	
Athlete	Event	Points	Rank	Points	Rank
Laura Strugnell	Solo technical routine	68.1776	22	did not advance	
Xera Vegter Maharajh	Solo free routine	66.1667	27	did not advance	
Skye MacDonald; Xera Vegter Maharajh	Duet technical routine	64.3119	30	did not advance	
Skye MacDonald; Xera Vegter Maharajh	Duet free routine	65.2333	32	did not advance	

Mixed

Athlete	Event	Preliminaries		Final	
Athlete	Event	Points	Rank	Points	Rank
Laura Strugnell; Ayrton Sweeney	Duet free routine	63.6000	13	did not advance	

== Diving ==
South Africa entered 4 divers.

Athlete	Event	Preliminaries		Semifinals		Final	
Athlete	Event	Points	Rank	Points	Rank	Points	Rank
Bailey Heydra	Women's 1 m springboard	200.45	34	—		did not advance	
Zalika Methula	Women's 1 m springboard	184.20	42	—		did not advance	
Grace Brammer; Kerry-Leigh Morrison	Women's synchronized 3 m springboard	190.20	13	—		did not advance	

== Open water swimming ==
South Africa entered 4 open water swimmers (2 male and 2 female)

Athlete	Event	Time	Rank
Ruan Breitenbach	Men's 5 km	57:54.9	29
Ruan Breitenbach	Men's 10 km	1:55:40.1	22
Connor Buck	Men's 5 km	56:39.6	28
Connor Buck	Men's 10 km	1:59:42.6	31
Amica de Jager	Women's 5 km	1:01:03.7	29
Amica de Jager	Women's 10 km	2:06:00.2	22
Catherine van Rensburg	Women's 5 km	1:00:55.6	18
Catherine van Rensburg	Women's 10 km	2:06:54.2	28
Ruan Breitenbach; Connor Buck; Amica de Jager; Catherine van Rensburg	Team	DSQ	

== Swimming ==
South Africa entered 9 swimmers.

Men

Athlete	Event	Heat		Semifinal		Final	
Athlete	Event	Time	Rank	Time	Rank	Time	Rank
Brendan Crawford	50 m breaststroke	28.21	26	did not advance			
Brendan Crawford	100 m breaststroke	1:01.25	23	did not advance			
Clayton Jimmie	50 m freestyle	22.74	43	did not advance			
Clayton Jimmie	100 m freestyle	50.68	55	did not advance			
Chad le Clos	50 m butterfly	23.86	33	did not advance			
Chad le Clos	100 m butterfly	DNS					
Chad le Clos	200 m butterfly	DNS					
Matthew Sates	200 m freestyle	1:47.28	14 Q	1:46.63	12	did not advance	
Matthew Sates	400 m freestyle	DNS					
Matthew Sates	100 m butterfly	54.17	41	did not advance			
Matthew Sates	200 m individual medley	1:58.61	7 Q	1:57.74	8 Q	1:58.27	8
Matthew Sates	400 m individual medle	4:14.81	11	—		did not advance	

Women

Athlete	Event	Heat		Semifinal		Final	
Athlete	Event	Time	Rank	Time	Rank	Time	Rank
Emma Chelius	50 m freestyle	24.87	7 Q	24.87	9	did not advance	
Emma Chelius	100 m freestyle	55.39	22	did not advance			
Stephanie Houtman	1500 m freestyle	17:08.12	21	—		did not advance	
Olivia Nel	50 m backstroke	29.06	23	did not advance			
Olivia Nel	100 m backstroke	1:02.95	25	did not advance			
Lara van Niekerk	50 m breaststroke	29.77 AF	1 Q	29.99	3 Q	29.90	3rd place, bronze medalist(s)
Lara van Niekerk	100 m breaststroke	1:06.75	10 Q	1:06.75	13	did not advance	

Mixed

Athlete	Event	Heat		Final	
Athlete	Event	Time	Rank	Time	Rank
Brendan Crawford; Stephanie Houtman; Clayton Jimmie; Olivia Nel	4 × 100 metre medley relay	4:00.65	18	did not advance	

== Water polo ==
Summary

Team	Event	Group stage				Playoff	Quarterfinal	Semifinal	Final / BM	
Team	Event	Opposition Score	Opposition Score	Opposition Score	Rank	Opposition Score	Opposition Score	Opposition Score	Opposition Score	Rank
South Africa	Men's tournament	Italy; L 4–22	Spain; L 2–28	Canada cancelled	3 P/off	United States; L 2–24	—	Georgia; L 7–20	Australia; L 4–19	12
South Africa	Women's tournament	United States; L 2–24	Argentina; L 6–7	Netherlands; L 1–22	4	—	—	Colombia; W 14–11	Brazil; W 8–7	13

=== Men's tournament ===
Team roster

The following is South African roster in the Water polo at the 2022 World Aquatics Championships – Men's tournament.

Head coach: Vaughn Marlow

- 1 Lwazi Madi GK
- 2 Ignardus Badenhorst FP
- 3 Niall Wheeler FP
- 4 Todd James Howard FP
- 5 Farouk Mayman FP
- 6 Roarke Olver FP
- 7 Cameron Bain Laurenson FP
- 8 Dane Tucker FP
- 9 Dylan Cronje FP
- 10 Ross Stuart Stone FP
- 11 Chad Roman FP
- 12 Jonathan Swanepoel FP
- 13 Lonwabo Mfikili GK

Group play

Pos	Team	Pld	W	D	L	GF	GA	GD	Pts	Qualification
1	Spain	2	2	0	0	42	14	+28	4	Quarterfinals
2	Italy	2	1	0	1	34	18	+16	2	Playoffs
3	South Africa	2	0	0	2	6	50	−44	0	Playoffs
4	Canada (Note: On 24 June, the Canadian team withdrew from the tournament after multiple positive COVID-19 cases amongst the team.)	0	0	0	0	0	0	0	0	Withdrew

Source: Sportresult
Rules for classification: 1) points; 2) head-to-head points; 3) head-to-head goal difference; 4) head-to-head number of goals scored; 5) Goal difference.
Notes:

21 June 2022; 18:00	Report	South Africa	4–22	Italy	Sopron Lőver Pool, Sopron; Referees: Radu Matache (ROU), Wallop Jirathornwattana (THA)
21 June 2022; 18:00	Report	Score by quarters: 1–3, 1–1, 0–7, 2–11			Sopron Lőver Pool, Sopron; Referees: Radu Matache (ROU), Wallop Jirathornwattana (THA)
21 June 2022; 18:00	Report	four players 1	Goals	Fondelli 4	Sopron Lőver Pool, Sopron; Referees: Radu Matache (ROU), Wallop Jirathornwattana (THA)

23 June 2022; 18:00	Report	Spain	28–2	South Africa	Sopron Lőver Pool, Sopron; Referees: Wallop Jirathornwattana (THA), Agustin Pinski (ARG)
23 June 2022; 18:00	Report	Score by quarters: 7–1, 7–0, 6–1, 8–0			Sopron Lőver Pool, Sopron; Referees: Wallop Jirathornwattana (THA), Agustin Pinski (ARG)
23 June 2022; 18:00	Report	Granados 6	Goals	Cronje, Howard 1	Sopron Lőver Pool, Sopron; Referees: Wallop Jirathornwattana (THA), Agustin Pinski (ARG)

Cancelled	Canada	–	South Africa

Playoffs

27 June 2022; 18:30	Report	South Africa	2–24	United States	Alfréd Hajós National Swimming Stadium, Budapest; Referees: Adil Aimbetov (KAZ), Andrew Carney (AUS)
27 June 2022; 18:30	Report	Score by quarters: 0–6, 0–6, 0–5, 2–7			Alfréd Hajós National Swimming Stadium, Budapest; Referees: Adil Aimbetov (KAZ), Andrew Carney (AUS)
27 June 2022; 18:30	Report	Stone, Swanepoel 1	Goals	Dodd 6	Alfréd Hajós National Swimming Stadium, Budapest; Referees: Adil Aimbetov (KAZ), Andrew Carney (AUS)

9th-12th place semifinal

29 June 2022; 18:30	Report	Georgia	20–7	South Africa	Szeged Tiszavirág Pool, Szeged; Referees: Radu Matache (ROU), Anbar Anbar (KUW)
29 June 2022; 18:30	Report	Score by quarters: 3–1, 5–1, 7–2, 5–3			Szeged Tiszavirág Pool, Szeged; Referees: Radu Matache (ROU), Anbar Anbar (KUW)
29 June 2022; 18:30	Report	three players 3	Goals	Olver 2	Szeged Tiszavirág Pool, Szeged; Referees: Radu Matache (ROU), Anbar Anbar (KUW)

Eleventh place game

1 July 2022; 17:00	Report	Australia	19–4	South Africa	Szeged Tiszavirág Pool, Szeged; Referees: Levan Berishvili (GEO), Agustin Pinski (ARG)
1 July 2022; 17:00	Report	Score by quarters: 3–2, 6–0, 4–1, 6–1			Szeged Tiszavirág Pool, Szeged; Referees: Levan Berishvili (GEO), Agustin Pinski (ARG)
1 July 2022; 17:00	Report	Pavillard 5	Goals	Swanepoel 2	Szeged Tiszavirág Pool, Szeged; Referees: Levan Berishvili (GEO), Agustin Pinski (ARG)

=== Women's tournament ===
Team roster

The following is South African roster in the Water polo at the 2022 World Aquatics Championships – Women's tournament.

Head coach: Delaine Mentoor

- 1 Daniela Passoni GK
- 2 Tumi Macdonell CB
- 3 Paige Tancrel FP
- 4 Anna Thornton-Dibb FP
- 5 Iman Akomolafe FP
- 6 Hanna Muller FP
- 7 Shakira January CB
- 8 Esihle Zondo CF
- 9 Nicola Macleod FP
- 10 Ruby Versfeld CF
- 11 Ashleigh Vaughn FP
- 12 Chloe Meecham CB
- 13 Meghan Maartens GK

Group play

Pos	Team	Pld	W	D	L	GF	GA	GD	Pts	Qualification
1	United States	3	3	0	0	58	12	+46	6	Quarterfinals
2	Netherlands	3	2	0	1	58	18	+40	4	Playoffs
3	Argentina	3	1	0	2	16	58	−42	2	Playoffs
4	South Africa	3	0	0	3	9	53	−44	0	

Source: Sportresult
Rules for classification: 1) points; 2) head-to-head points; 3) head-to-head goal difference; 4) head-to-head number of goals scored; 5) Goal difference.

20 June 2022; 18:00	Report	South Africa	2–24	United States	Debrecen Swimming Pool Complex, Debrecen; Referees: Megan Perry (NZL), Ivan Raković (SRB)
20 June 2022; 18:00	Report	Score by quarters: 0–7, 0–10, 1–3, 1–4			Debrecen Swimming Pool Complex, Debrecen; Referees: Megan Perry (NZL), Ivan Raković (SRB)
20 June 2022; 18:00	Report	Meecham, Zondo 1	Goals	Haralabidis 5	Debrecen Swimming Pool Complex, Debrecen; Referees: Megan Perry (NZL), Ivan Raković (SRB)

22 June 2022; 18:00	Report	Argentina	7–6	South Africa	Debrecen Swimming Pool Complex, Debrecen; Referees: Adil Aimbetov (KAZ), Edgar Baron (COL)
22 June 2022; 18:00	Report	Score by quarters: 1–1, 1–2, 3–1, 2–2			Debrecen Swimming Pool Complex, Debrecen; Referees: Adil Aimbetov (KAZ), Edgar Baron (COL)
22 June 2022; 18:00	Report	Leonard 3	Goals	Vaughan 2	Debrecen Swimming Pool Complex, Debrecen; Referees: Adil Aimbetov (KAZ), Edgar Baron (COL)

24 June 2022; 19:30	Report	Netherlands	22–1	South Africa	Debrecen Swimming Pool Complex, Debrecen; Referees: Ivan Raković (SRB), Edgar Baron (COL)
24 June 2022; 19:30	Report	Score by quarters: 5–1, 4–0, 7–0, 6–0			Debrecen Swimming Pool Complex, Debrecen; Referees: Ivan Raković (SRB), Edgar Baron (COL)
24 June 2022; 19:30	Report	Moolhuijzen 5	Goals	Versfeld 1	Debrecen Swimming Pool Complex, Debrecen; Referees: Ivan Raković (SRB), Edgar Baron (COL)

13th-16th place semifinal

26 June 2022; 17:00	Report	Colombia	11–14	South Africa	Szeged Tiszavirag Pool, Szeged; Referees: Asumi Tsuzaki (JPN), Pascal Bouchez (FRA)
26 June 2022; 17:00	Report	Score by quarters: 3–4, 3–5, 3–3, 2–2			Szeged Tiszavirag Pool, Szeged; Referees: Asumi Tsuzaki (JPN), Pascal Bouchez (FRA)
26 June 2022; 17:00	Report	Marín, Vanegas 3	Goals	MacLeod 4	Szeged Tiszavirag Pool, Szeged; Referees: Asumi Tsuzaki (JPN), Pascal Bouchez (FRA)

13th place game

28 June 2022; 15:30	Report	South Africa	8–7	Brazil	Szeged Tiszavirag Pool, Szeged; Referees: Megan Perry (NZL), Veselin Mišković (MNE)
28 June 2022; 15:30	Report	Score by quarters: 2–2, 3–3, 0–1, 3–1			Szeged Tiszavirag Pool, Szeged; Referees: Megan Perry (NZL), Veselin Mišković (MNE)
28 June 2022; 15:30	Report	January 2	Goals	Coutinho 3	Szeged Tiszavirag Pool, Szeged; Referees: Megan Perry (NZL), Veselin Mišković (MNE)
