= Krystyna Panchishko =

Ukrainian swimmer (born 1998)

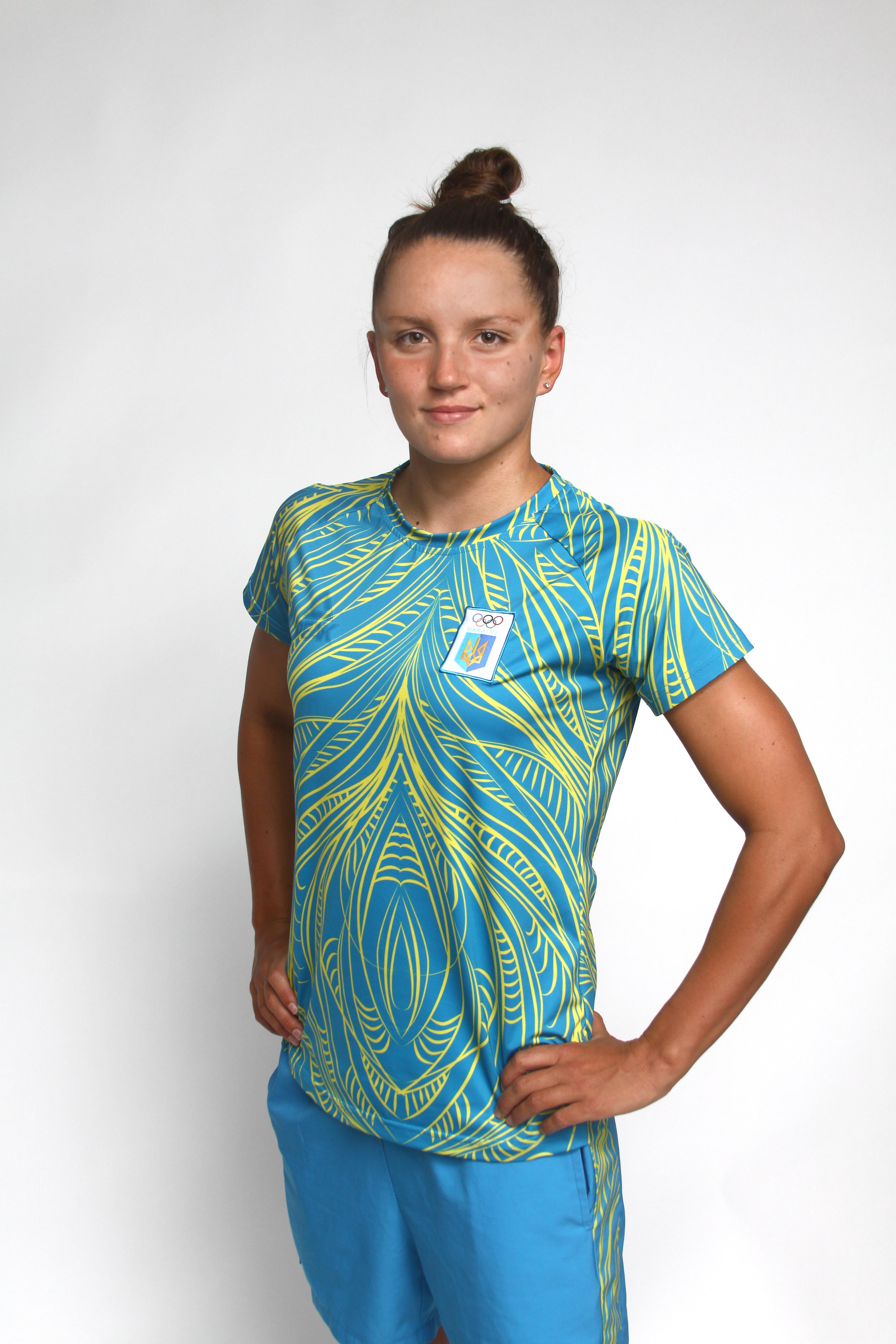

Personal information
- Nationality: Ukraine
- Born: Krystyna Panchishko; 3 June 1998 (age 28) Rubizhne, Ukraine
- Height: 167 cm (5 ft 6 in)
- Weight: 57 kg (126 lb)

Sport
- Sport: Swimming
- Event: Marathon swimming

Krystyna Panchishko (born 3 June 1998) is a Ukrainian marathon swimmer.

== Career ==
She competed in the 2020 Summer Olympics.

She took up swimming in 2003 in Rubizhne, Ukraine. Her grandmother introduced her to swimming. In 2007, she with her family moved to live in Kyiv.

From 2012 to the present day, her coach is Mariya Golub, a Ukrainian swimming and open water swimming coach. Since 2019, she also trained in Montpellier, France, with Philippe Lucas. She competed in pool swimming at the European junior championships in 2013 and 2014. She began competing in open water swimming at the 2015 Ukrainian Championships.

Championships

- European Junior Open water swimming championships (2015; 2016; 2017) of LEN European Aquatics Championships
- European Aquatics Championships:
  - 2016 European Aquatics Championships: Open water swimming – Women's 10 km
  - 2018 European Aquatics Championships: Open water swimming – Women's 5 km
  - 2020 European Aquatics Championships: Open water swimming – Women's 10 km
- World Aquatics Championships (open water)
  - 2017 World Aquatics Championships: Open water swimming – Women's 10 km
  - 2019 World Aquatics Championships: Open water swimming – Women's 5 km
  - 2022 World Aquatics Championships:
    - Open water swimming – Women's 5 km
    - Open water swimming – Women's 10 km
- 2020 Summer Olympics: Women's marathon 10 km

== See also ==
- European Aquatics Championships
- FINA World Aquatics Championships
