= Czech Republic at the 2022 World Aquatics Championships =

- Flag of the Czech Republic
- World Aquatics code: CZE
- National federation: Czech Swimming Federation
- Website: czechswimming.cz (in Czech)

in Budapest, Hungary
- Competitors: 9 in 3 sports
- Medals: Gold 0 Silver 0 Bronze 0 Total 0

World Aquatics Championships appearances
- 1994; 1998; 2001; 2003; 2005; 2007; 2009; 2011; 2013; 2015; 2017; 2019; 2022; 2023; 2024; 2025

Other related appearances
- Czechoslovakia (1973–1991)

The Czech Republic competed at the 2022 World Aquatics Championships in Budapest, Hungary from 17 June to 3 July.

== Artistic swimming ==
The Czech Republic's artistic swimming team consisted of 2 athletes (2 female).

Women

Athlete	Event	Preliminaries		Final	
Athlete	Event	Points	Rank	Points	Rank
Karolína Klusková	Solo technical routine	74.8578	17	did not advance	
Karolína Klusková	Solo free routine	74.6667	18	did not advance	
Karolína Klusková; Aneta Mrázková	Duet technical routine	76.2891	18	did not advance	
Karolína Klusková; Aneta Mrázková	Duet free routine	77.0667	19	did not advance	

== Open water swimming ==
Czech Republic qualified two male and one female open water swimmers.

Men

Athlete	Event	Time	Rank
Matěj Kozubek	5 km	58:21.0	32
Matěj Kozubek	10 km	did not finish	
Ondřej Zach	5 km	56:28.9	=24
Ondřej Zach	10 km	1:54:27.8	15

Women

Athlete	Event	Time	Rank
Lenka Štěrbová	5 km	1:00:57.1	19
Lenka Štěrbová	10 km	2:06:54.0	27

== Swimming ==
Czech Republic entered three swimmers.

Men

Athlete	Event	Heat		Semifinal		Final	
Athlete	Event	Time	Rank	Time	Rank	Time	Rank
Jan Čejka	50 m backstroke	25.89	27	did not advance			
Jan Čejka	100 m backstroke	55.22	23	did not advance			
Jan Čejka	200 m backstroke	1:58.65	13 Q	1:59.28	14	did not advance	

Women

Athlete	Event	Heat		Semifinal		Final	
Athlete	Event	Time	Rank	Time	Rank	Time	Rank
Kristýna Horská	100 m breaststroke	1:09.39	28	did not advance			
Kristýna Horská	200 m breaststroke	2:27.84	14 Q	2:27.87	15	did not advance	
Kristýna Horská	200 m medley	2:15.04	20	did not advance			
Simona Kubová	50 m backstroke	28.38	14 Q	28.35	16	did not advance	
Simona Kubová	100 m backstroke	1:01.19	18	did not advance			
