= Turkey at the 2017 World Aquatics Championships =

- Flag of Turkey
- FINA code: TUR
- National federation: Türkiye Yüzme Federasyonu
- Website: www.tyf.gov.tr

in Budapest, Hungary
- Competitors: 6 in 2 sports
- Medals: Gold 0 Silver 0 Bronze 0 Total 0

World Aquatics Championships appearances
- 1973; 1975; 1978; 1982; 1986; 1991; 1994; 1998; 2001; 2003; 2005; 2007; 2009; 2011; 2013; 2015; 2017; 2019; 2022; 2023; 2024

Turkey is scheduled to compete at the 2017 World Aquatics Championships in Budapest, Hungary from 14 July to 30 July.

== Swimming ==
Turkish swimmers have achieved qualifying standards in the following events (up to a maximum of 2 swimmers in each event at the A-standard entry time, and 1 at the B-standard):

Athlete	Event	Heat		Semifinal		Final	
Athlete	Event	Time	Rank	Time	Rank	Time	Rank
Kaan Ayar	Men's 50 m butterfly	24.73	44	did not advance			
Kaan Ayar	Men's 100 m butterfly	52.52	24	did not advance			
Hüseyin Emre Sakçı	Men's 50 m freestyle	22.93	=49	did not advance			
Hüseyin Emre Sakçı	Men's 100 m freestyle	50.01	48	did not advance			
Hüseyin Emre Sakçı	Men's 50 m breaststroke	27.90	30	did not advance			
Hüseyin Emre Sakçı	Men's 100 m breaststroke	1:02.15	40	did not advance			
Ekaterina Avramova	Women's 50 m backstroke	29.11	34	did not advance			
Ekaterina Avramova	Women's 100 m backstroke	1:02.42	34	did not advance			
Ekaterina Avramova	Women's 200 m backstroke	DNS		did not advance			
Viktoriya Zeynep Güneş	Women's 100 m breaststroke	1:10.30	32	did not advance			
Viktoriya Zeynep Güneş	Women's 200 m breaststroke	2:28.68	17	did not advance			
Viktoriya Zeynep Güneş	Women's 200 m individual medley	2:13.56	19	did not advance			
Viktoriya Zeynep Güneş	Women's 400 m individual medley	4:42.27	17	—		did not advance	

== Synchronized swimming ==
Turkey's synchronized swimming team consisted of 2 athletes (2 female).

Women

Athlete	Event	Preliminaries		Final	
Athlete	Event	Points	Rank	Points	Rank
Defne Bakırcı	Solo free routine	77.3000	20	did not advance	
Defne Bakırcı; Mısra Gündeş	Duet technical routine	75.8019	24	did not advance	
Defne Bakırcı; Mısra Gündeş	Duet free routine	76.4667	26	did not advance	
