= Artistic swimming at the 2022 World Aquatics Championships – Duet free routine =

Swimming competition

Duet free routine at the 2022 World Aquatics Championships
- Venue: Szechy Pool
- Location: Budapest, Hungary
- Dates: 21 June (preliminary); 23 June (final)
- Competitors: 66 from 33 nations
- Teams: 33
- Winning points: 95.5667

Medalists
gold medal	Wang Liuyi; Wang Qianyi	China
silver medal	Maryna Aleksiiva; Vladyslava Aleksiiva	Ukraine
bronze medal	Anna-Maria Alexandri; Eirini-Marina Alexandri	Austria

The Duet free routine competition at the 2022 World Aquatics Championships was held on 21 and 23 June 2022.

== Results ==
The preliminary round was started on 21 June at 09:00. The final was started on 23 June at 16:00.

Green denotes finalists

Rank	Nation	Swimmers	Preliminary		Final	
Rank	Nation	Swimmers	Points	Rank	Points	Rank
1st place, gold medalist(s)	China	Wang Liuyi; Wang Qianyi	94.5667	1	95.5667	1
2nd place, silver medalist(s)	Ukraine	Maryna Aleksiiva; Vladyslava Aleksiiva	94.0000	2	94.1667	2
3rd place, bronze medalist(s)	Austria	Anna-Maria Alexandri; Eirini-Marina Alexandri	92.0667	3	92.8000	3
4	Italy	Linda Cerruti; Costanza Ferro	90.5333	4	91.3333	4
5	Spain	Alisa Ozhogina; Iris Tió	89.9667	5	90.6667	5
6	Greece	Sofia Malkogeorgou; Evangelia Platanioti	89.3667	6	89.7000	6
7	Mexico	Nuria Diosdado; Joana Jiménez	87.5333	7	88.0333	7
8	Netherlands	Bregje de Brouwer; Marloes Steenbeek	86.8000	8	87.4667	8
9	United States	Megumi Field; Natalia Vega	86.6667	9	87.0000	9
10	Israel	Eden Blecher; Shelly Bobritsky	85.6000	10	85.6000	10
11	Great Britain	Kate Shortman; Isabelle Thorpe	84.9000	11	84.8667	11
12	Germany	Marlene Bojer; Michelle Zimmer	82.8000	12	82.9333	12
13	Switzerland	Ilona Fahrni; Babou Schupbach	81.4000	13		
14	Uzbekistan	Diana Onkes; Ziyodakhon Toshkhujaeva	81.3333	14		
15	South Korea	Hur Yoon-seo; Lee Ri-young	80.9000	15		
16	Portugal	Maria Gonçalves; Cheila Vieira	79.3333	16		
17	San Marino	Jasmine Verbena; Jasmine Zonzini	79.1333	17		
18	Brazil	Laura Miccuci; Anna Veloso	78.8667	18		
19	Czech Republic	Karolína Klusková; Aneta Mrázková	77.0667	19		
20	Serbia	Sofija Džipković; Jelena Kontić	76.5667	20		
21	Egypt	Farida Abdelbary; Hana Hiekal	76.1333	21		
22	Colombia	Melisa Ceballos; Estefanía Roa	75.5333	22		
23	Croatia	Antonija Huljev; Klara Šilobodec	74.1000	23		
24	Argentina	Luisina Caussi; Camila Pineda	74.0667	24		
25	Sweden	Anna Hogdal; Clara Ternström	73.0667	25		
26	Australia	Pam Kurosawa; Zoe Poulis	70.8667	26		
27	Turkey	Selin Telci; Ece Üngör	70.2333	27		
28	Thailand	Pongpimporn Pongsuwan; Supitchaya Songpan	69.0000	28		
29	Cuba	Gabriela Alpajon; Stephany Urbina	68.5333	29		
30	Aruba	Maria Salazar; Melanie Tromp	67.6667	30		
31	Costa Rica	Andrea Maroto; Raquel Zúñiga	66.4000	31		
32	South Africa	Skye MacDonald; Xera Vegter	65.2333	32		
33	Malta	Thea Blake; Ana Culic	65.2000	33		
–	New Zealand	Eva Morris; Eden Worsley	Did not start			
–	Singapore	Debbie Soh; Miya Yong	Did not start			
