= Turkey at the 2023 World Aquatics Championships =

- Flag of Turkey
- FINA code: TUR
- National federation: Turkish Swimming Federation
- Website: tyf.gov.tr (in Turkish)

in Fukuoka, Japan
- Competitors: 11 in 2 sports
- Medals: Gold 0 Silver 0 Bronze 0 Total 0

World Aquatics Championships appearances
- 1973; 1975; 1978; 1982; 1986; 1991; 1994; 1998; 2001; 2003; 2005; 2007; 2009; 2011; 2013; 2015; 2017; 2019; 2022; 2023; 2024

Turkey competed at the 2023 World Aquatics Championships in Fukuoka, Japan from 14 to 30 July.

== Artistic swimming ==
Turkey entered 3 artistic swimmers.

Women

Athlete	Event	Preliminaries		Final	
Athlete	Event	Points	Rank	Points	Rank
Ece Üngör	Solo technical routine	163.0701	23	did not advance	
Ece Üngör	Solo free routine	153.9521	10 Q	160.4291	10
Nil Talu; Esmanur Yirmibeş	Duet technical routine	163.6001	32	did not advance	
Nil Talu; Esmanur Yirmibeş	Duet free routine	105.6480	34	did not advance	

== Swimming ==
Turkey entered 6 swimmers.

Men

Athlete	Event	Heat		Semifinal		Final	
Athlete	Event	Time	Rank	Time	Rank	Time	Rank
Berkay Ömer Öğretir	100 metre breaststroke	59.99	13 Q	59.50	8 Q	59.79	8
Berkay Ömer Öğretir	200 metre breaststroke	2:12.65	25	Did not advance			
Berke Saka	100 metre backstroke	55.09	29	Did not advance			
Berke Saka	200 metre backstroke	1:59.48	20	Did not advance			
Berke Saka	200 metre individual medley	1:59.72	18	Did not advance			
Emre Sakçı	50 metre freestyle	22.94	53	Did not advance			
Emre Sakçı	50 metre breaststroke	27.28	13 Q	27.32	13	Did not advance	
Emre Sakçı	50 metre butterfly	24.72	56	Did not advance			
Baturalp Ünlü	200 metre freestyle	1:54.56	48	Did not advance			

Women

Athlete	Event	Heat		Semifinal		Final	
Athlete	Event	Time	Rank	Time	Rank	Time	Rank
Deniz Ertan	400 metre freestyle	4:11.29	19	—		Did not advance	
Deniz Ertan	800 metre freestyle	8:32.54	15	—		Did not advance	
Merve Tuncel	200 metre freestyle	2:02.66	42	Did not advance			
Merve Tuncel	400 metre freestyle	4:13.34	26	—		Did not advance	
Merve Tuncel	800 metre freestyle	8:39.47	22	—		Did not advance	
Merve Tuncel	1500 metre freestyle	16:39.30	24	—		Did not advance	
Deniz Ertan; Merve Tuncel; Ecem Dönmez; Ela Naz Özdemir	4 × 200 m freestyle relay	8:10.76	18	—		Did not advance	
