= Swimming at the 2022 World Aquatics Championships – Women's 400 metre freestyle =

Women's 400 metre freestyle at the 2022 World Aquatics Championships
- Venue: Danube Arena
- Location: Budapest, Hungary
- Dates: 18 June (heats and final)
- Competitors: 34 from 27 nations
- Winning time: 3:58.15

Medalists
gold medal	Katie Ledecky	United States
silver medal	Summer McIntosh	Canada
bronze medal	Leah Smith	United States

The Women's 400 metre freestyle competition at the 2022 World Aquatics Championships was held on 18 June 2022.

== Records ==
Prior to the competition, the existing world and championship records were as follows.

World record	Ariarne Titmus (AUS)	3:56.40	Adelaide, Australia	22 May 2022
Competition record	Katie Ledecky (USA)	3:58.34	Budapest, Hungary	23 July 2017

The following new records were set during this competition.

Date	Event	Name	Nationality	Time	Record
18 June	Final	Katie Ledecky	United States	3:58.15	CR

== Results ==
=== Heats ===
The heats were started at 10:11.

Rank	Heat	Lane	Name	Nationality	Time	Notes
1	4	4	Katie Ledecky	United States	3:59.79	Q
2	4	5	Summer McIntosh	Canada	4:03.19	Q
3	4	3	Lani Pallister	Australia	4:03.71	Q
4	4	2	Kiah Melverton	Australia	4:03.74	Q
5	4	6	Leah Smith	United States	4:04.43	Q
6	3	3	Erika Fairweather	New Zealand	4:06.00	Q
7	3	5	Tang Muhan	China	4:06.29	Q
8	3	6	Isabel Marie Gose	Germany	4:06.44	Q
9	3	2	Miyu Namba	Japan	4:08.07	
10	3	4	Li Bingjie	China	4:08.25	
11	3	7	Waka Kobori	Japan	4:08.55	
12	4	7	Ajna Késely	Hungary	4:09.09	
13	3	1	Eve Thomas	New Zealand	4:09.49	
14	3	8	Freya Anderson	Great Britain	4:11.82	
15	3	9	Katja Fain	Slovenia	4:12.05	
16	4	0	Gabrielle Roncatto	Brazil	4:12.09	
17	4	8	Marlene Kahler	Austria	4:12.55	
18	3	0	Freya Colbert	Great Britain	4:12.82	
19	2	4	Han Da-kyung	South Korea	4:13.29	
20	4	9	Valentine Dumont	Belgium	4:13.33	
21	2	5	Helena Rosendahl Bach	Denmark	4:13.36	
22	4	1	Bettina Fábián	Hungary	4:14.06	
23	2	6	Gan Ching Hwee	Singapore	4:15.19	
24	2	3	Paula Otero	Spain	4:18.90	
25	2	2	Zhanet Angelova	Bulgaria	4:20.55	
26	2	7	Kamonchanok Kwanmuang	Thailand	4:27.01	
27	2	1	Võ Thị Mỹ Tiên	Vietnam	4:28.99	
28	2	8	Jamila Boulakbech	Tunisia	4:32.54	
29	2	9	Natalia Kuipers	U.S. Virgin Islands	4:33.54	
30	1	4	Jehanara Nabi	Pakistan	4:37.93	
31	1	2	Bianca Mitchell	Antigua and Barbuda	4:45.89	
32	1	5	Therese Soukup	Seychelles	4:46.09	
33	1	3	Arianna Lont	Sint Maarten	5:19.07	
34	1	6	Keana Santos	Guam	5:28.52	
—	2	0	Talita Te Flan	Ivory Coast	DNS	

=== Final ===
The final was held at 18:41.

Rank	Lane	Name	Nationality	Time	Notes
1st place, gold medalist(s)	4	Katie Ledecky	United States	3:58.15	CR
2nd place, silver medalist(s)	5	Summer McIntosh	Canada	3:59.39	NR
3rd place, bronze medalist(s)	2	Leah Smith	United States	4:02.08	
4	3	Lani Pallister	Australia	4:02.16	
5	8	Isabel Marie Gose	Germany	4:03.47	
6	7	Erika Fairweather	New Zealand	4:04.73	
7	6	Kiah Melverton	Australia	4:05.62	
8	1	Tang Muhan	China	4:10.70	
