= Swimming at the 2022 World Aquatics Championships – Men's 50 metre breaststroke =

Men's 50 metre breaststroke at the 2022 World Aquatics Championships
- Venue: Danube Arena
- Location: Budapest, Hungary
- Dates: 20 June (heats and semifinals); 21 June (final)
- Competitors: 65 from 61 nations
- Winning time: 26.45

Medalists
gold medal	Nic Fink	United States
silver medal	Nicolò Martinenghi	Italy
bronze medal	Michael Andrew	United States

The Men's 50 metre breaststroke competition at the 2022 World Aquatics Championships was held on 20 and 21 June 2022.

== Records ==
Prior to the competition, the existing world and championship records were as follows.

World record	Adam Peaty (GBR)	25.95	Budapest, Hungary	25 July 2017
Competition record	Adam Peaty (GBR)	25.95	Budapest, Hungary	25 July 2017

== Results ==
=== Heats ===
The heats were started on 20 June at 09:00.

Rank	Heat	Lane	Name	Nationality	Time	Notes
1	7	4	Nicolò Martinenghi	Italy	26.68	Q
2	6	4	Michael Andrew	United States	26.71	Q
3	7	5	João Gomes Júnior	Brazil	26.75	Q
4	5	4	Nic Fink	United States	26.85	Q
5	5	3	Lucas Matzerath	Germany	27.01	Q
6	6	2	Bernhard Reitshammer	Austria	27.12	Q, NR
7	7	7	Yan Zibei	China	27.15	Q
8	5	5	Simone Cerasuolo	Italy	27.17	Q
9	6	3	Felipe França Silva	Brazil	27.22	Q
10	5	6	Kristian Pitshugin	Israel	27.45	Q
11	6	7	Caspar Corbeau	Netherlands	27.48	Q
12	5	7	Choi Dong-yeol	South Korea	27.55	Q
13	6	5	Emre Sakçı	Turkey	27.56	Q
14	5	2	Andrius Šidlauskas	Lithuania	27.62	Q
15	4	2	Mikel Schreuders	Aruba	27.64	Q, NR
15	7	2	Peter John Stevens	Slovenia	27.64	Q
17	5	8	Antoine Viquerat	France	27.68	
18	7	3	Itay Goldfaden	Israel	27.87	
19	7	8	Arkadios Aspougalis	Greece	27.88	
20	7	9	Denis Petrashov	Kyrgyzstan	27.89	NR
21	7	6	André Klippenberg Grindheim	Norway	27.90	
22	6	8	Grayson Bell	Australia	27.91	
23	6	6	Youssef El-Kamash	Egypt	27.92	
24	4	4	Maksym Ovchinnikov	Ukraine	27.99	
25	4	1	Nicholas Mahabir	Singapore	28.11	
26	4	3	Brenden Crawford	South Africa	28.21	
27	4	8	Samy Boutouil	Morocco	28.22	NR
28	5	1	Olivér Gál	Hungary	28.26	
29	5	0	Wu Chun-feng	Chinese Taipei	28.34	
30	7	1	Renato Prono	Paraguay	28.41	
31	3	2	Constantin Malachi	Moldova	28.43	NR
32	6	1	Izaak Bastian	Bahamas	28.47	
33	7	0	Édgar Crespo	Panama	28.59	
34	3	7	Adrian Robinson	Botswana	28.61	NR
35	4	6	Aibek Kamzenov	Kazakhstan	28.70	
36	4	0	Andrés Martijena	Dominican Republic	28.78	
37	4	7	Phạm Thanh Bảo	Vietnam	28.90	
38	4	5	Martin Melconian	Uruguay	28.93	
39	4	9	Kito Campbell	Jamaica	29.06	
40	1	1	Kledi Kadiu	Albania	29.15	
41	2	4	Tasi Limtiaco	Micronesia	29.23	
42	3	4	Matthew Lawrence	Mozambique	29.25	
43	3	0	Jonathan Raharvel	Madagascar	29.50	
44	3	9	Abobakr Abass	Sudan	29.69	
45	3	6	Rashed Al-Tarmoom	Kuwait	29.70	
46	3	3	Sébastien Kouma	Mali	29.94	
47	2	6	Tendo Mukalazi	Uganda	30.03	NR
48	3	8	Giacomo Casadei	San Marino	30.07	
49	1	7	Filippos Iakovidis	Cyprus	30.13	
50	3	1	Arnoldo Herrera	Costa Rica	30.14	
51	2	2	Kumaren Naidu	Zambia	31.00	
52	2	7	Fahim Anwari	Afghanistan	31.70	
53	1	5	Slava Sihanouvong	Laos	31.80	
54	2	9	Jion Hosei	Palau	34.92	
55	1	3	Basem Rashed	Yemen	38.14	
56	1	8	Daoud Ali Haroun	Djibouti	39.58	
57	2	1	Refiloe Chopho	Lesotho	40.56	
	1	2	Zandanbal Gunsennorov	Mongolia	Disqualified	
	1	4	Higinio Obama	Equatorial Guinea	Disqualified	
	2	3	Filipe Gomes	Malawi	Disqualified	
	2	5	Julio Calero	Cuba	Disqualified	
	2	8	Asdad Fenelus	Haiti	Disqualified	
	5	9	Lyubomir Epitropov	Bulgaria	Disqualified	
	6	0	Julio Horrego	Honduras	Disqualified	
	6	9	James Dergousoff	Canada	Disqualified	
	1	6	Fabrice Mopama	DR Congo	Did not start	
	2	0	Patrick Amegashie	Togo	Did not start	
	3	5	Luis Weekes	Barbados	Did not start	

=== Semifinals ===
The semifinals were started on 20 June at 18:34.

Rank	Heat	Lane	Name	Nationality	Time	Notes
1	2	4	Nicolò Martinenghi	Italy	26.56	Q
2	1	4	Michael Andrew	United States	26.73	Q
3	1	5	Nic Fink	United States	26.74	Q
4	2	3	Lucas Matzerath	Germany	26.99	Q
5	1	6	Simone Cerasuolo	Italy	27.01	Q
6	2	6	Yan Zibei	China	27.07	Q
7	1	3	Bernhard Reitshammer	Austria	27.11	Q, NR
8	2	2	Felipe França Silva	Brazil	27.20	Q
9	1	7	Choi Dong-yul	South Korea	27.34	
10	2	1	Emre Sakçı	Turkey	27.37	
11	1	2	Kristian Pitshugin	Israel	27.42	
12	2	7	Caspar Corbeau	Netherlands	27.44	
13	2	8	Mikel Schreuders	Aruba	27.52	NR
14	1	1	Andrius Šidlauskas	Lithuania	27.54	
15	1	8	Peter John Stevens	Slovenia	27.71	
–	2	5	João Gomes Júnior	Brazil	Disqualified	

=== Final ===
The final was held on 21 June at 19:11.

Rank	Lane	Name	Nationality	Time	Notes
1st place, gold medalist(s)	3	Nic Fink	United States	26.45	NR
2nd place, silver medalist(s)	4	Nicolò Martinenghi	Italy	26.48	
3rd place, bronze medalist(s)	5	Michael Andrew	United States	26.72	
4	1	Bernhard Reitshammer	Austria	26.94	NR
5	2	Simone Cerasuolo	Italy	26.98	
6	6	Lucas Matzerath	Germany	27.10	
7	7	Yan Zibei	China	27.18	
8	8	Felipe França Silva	Brazil	27.42	
