= Open water swimming at the 2022 World Aquatics Championships – Women's 5 km =

Women's 5 km at the 2022 World Aquatics Championships
- Venue: Lake Lupa
- Location: Hungary
- Dates: 27 June
- Competitors: 56 from 37 nations
- Winning time: 57:52.9

Medalists
gold medal	Ana Marcela Cunha	Brazil
silver medal	Aurélie Muller	France
bronze medal	Giulia Gabbrielleschi	Italy

The Women's 5 km competition at the 2022 World Aquatics Championships was held on 27 June 2022.

== Results ==
The race was started at 12:00.

Rank	Swimmer	Nationality	Time
1st place, gold medalist(s)	Ana Marcela Cunha	Brazil	57:52.9
2nd place, silver medalist(s)	Aurélie Muller	France	57:53.8
3rd place, bronze medalist(s)	Giulia Gabbrielleschi	Italy	57:54.9
4	Leonie Beck	Germany	57:56.2
5	María de Valdés	Spain	57:59.0
6	Ginevra Taddeucci	Italy	58:00.4
7	Viviane Jungblut	Brazil	58:00.5
8	Moesha Johnson	Australia	58:02.5
9	Jeannette Spiwoks	Germany	58:06.2
10	Sharon van Rouwendaal	Netherlands	58:08.9
11	Airi Ebina	Japan	1:00:00.0
12	Summer Smith	United States	1:00:02.2
13	Yukimi Moriyama	Japan	1:00:03.7
14	Ángela Martínez	Spain	1:00:49.5
15	Réka Rohács	Hungary	1:00:51.5
16	Nip Tsz Yin	Hong Kong	1:00:51.6
17	Eva Fabian	Israel	1:00:54.4
18	Catherine van Rensburg	South Africa	1:00:55.6
19	Lenka Štěrbová	Czech Republic	1:00:57.1
20	Anna Auld	United States	1:00:57.2
21	Burcu Naz Narin	Turkey	1:00:57.4
22	Ma Xiaoming	China	1:00:59.0
23	Špela Perše	Slovenia	1:00:59.1
24	Vivien Balogh	Hungary	1:00:59.2
25	Krystyna Panchishko	Ukraine	1:01:00.3
26	Finella Gibbs-Beal	Australia	1:01:01.2
27	Sevim Eylül Süpürgeci	Turkey	1:01:01.2
28	Emma Finlin	Canada	1:01:01.3
29	Amica de Jager	South Africa	1:01:03.7
30	Lee Jeong-min	South Korea	1:01:07.7
31	Abby Dunford	Canada	1:01:08.9
32	María Bramont-Arias	Peru	1:01:13.9
33	Diana Taszhanova	Kazakhstan	1:03:02.7
34	Martha Sandoval	Mexico	1:03:13.5
35	Arianna Valloni	San Marino	1:03:38.5
36	Nikita Lam	Hong Kong	1:04:03.8
37	Fátima Portillo	El Salvador	1:04:56.7
38	Isabella Babbitt	Ecuador	1:04:59.3
39	Ruby Heath	New Zealand	1:05:15.7
40	Xeniya Romanchuk	Kazakhstan	1:05:22.5
41	Citlalli Mora	Mexico	1:05:22.8
42	Chantal Liew	Singapore	1:05:28.8
43	Kim Jin-ha	South Korea	1:05:33.4
44	Mariia Bondarenko	Ukraine	1:05:56.3
45	Leandra Díaz	Puerto Rico	1:07:12.3
46	Candice Ang	Singapore	1:07:56.3
47	Sofía Guevara	Ecuador	1:07:56.6
48	Alondra Quiles	Puerto Rico	1:09:22.9
49	María Porres	Guatemala	1:10:09.4
50	Maiza Cardozo	Uruguay	1:11:31.5
51	Therese Soukup	Seychelles	1:12:01.6
–	Sindhu Moro	India	OTL
–	Diana Quirós	Costa Rica	OTL
–	Leslie Rojas	Bolivia	OTL
–	Karimah Katemba	Uganda	OTL
–	Seneshi Herath	Sri Lanka	Did not start
