= Marnie Kennedy =

Australian writer and domestic servant

Margaret "Marnie" Kennedy (1919 – 30 September 1985) was an Australian writer and domestic servant.

== Biography ==
The daughter of Rosie Baker, of the Kalkatungu people, and an unknown white stockman, she was born on Coppermine Creek near Cloncurry, Queensland. She was sent with her mother to the Palm Island reserve when she was still young. At the age of 13, she was sent to Blue Range Station outside of Charters Towers, where she worked as a domestic. In 1936, she married Alwyn Kennedy, an Aboriginal stockman; the couple had two sons. They were granted an exemption from the Aboriginals Protection and Restriction of the Sale of Opium Act 1897. In 1944, she left her husband and moved to Ingham but returned to Blue Range later that year. She returned to Ingham with her new partner Sam, a white stockman, in 1948. In 1950, she moved with Sam to Mount Isa. She worked with Sam at Oban, Oxton Downs, Walgra and Carandotta sheep stations. She divorced her first husband in 1959. In 1972, she moved to Charters Towers; she later settled in Townsville.

In 1982, she published a short story "God's Gift to the Aborigines" and a poem "Our History" in Identity magazine. The poem was reprinted in the Asian Bureau Australia newsletter two years later. She published an autobiography Born a Half-Caste in 1985. In the preface, she expressed the hope that white Australians would come to recognize the injustices that were inflicted on her people by the government and "help to heal the damage".

Kennedy saw herself as "neither white nor black", the product of an attempt by the Australian government to eliminate their ethnic group by breeding with white people.

Kennedy died of cancer in Townsville in 1985.
