= 2022 World Aquatics Championships =

19th FINA World Championships

19th FINA World Championships
- Host city: Budapest, Hungary
- Date: 17 June – 3 July 2022
- Venue(s): Duna Aréna, Lake Lupa, Alfréd Hajós Swimming Complex, Debrecen Swimming Pool Complex, Szeged Tiszavirág Pool, Sopron Lőver Pool
- Opened by: Katalin Novák
- Closed by: Husain Al-Musallam

The 2022 World Aquatics Championships, the 19th edition of the FINA World Aquatics Championships, were held in Budapest, Hungary, from 17 June to 3 July 2022. These championships included five disciplines, with high diving not staged for this edition of the championships.

== Host selection ==
In 2013, FINA announced Gwangju, South Korea, and Budapest, Hungary, as the respective hosts of the 2019 and 2021 FINA World Aquatics Championships. In early 2015 Guadalajara, Mexico, withdrew from hosting the 2017 Championships due to a due to financial problems fueled by the global drop in oil prices. FINA Bureau members held a vote by email for a replacement host city, with the majority voting in favour of bringing forward Budapest as host city for 2017, and re-running the bidding process for the 2021 edition for the Championships. The 2021 championships were eventually awarded to Fukuoka, Japan, and were scheduled to be held between 16 July and August 1, 2021. To avoid a clash with the postponed 2020 Summer Olympics the event was rescheduled to be held between 13 and 29 May 2022. However, in January 2022, it was announced that the event in Fukuoka would be postponed a second time to 14–30 July 2023 due to the health impacts of the Omicron variant and the pandemic measures in Japan. A week later, on 7 February 2022, Hungarian Prime Minister Viktor Orbán and FINA President Husain Al-Musallam announced an agreement for Budapest to hold an extraordinary edition of the FINA World Championships from 18 June to 3 July 2022 with the press release stating: "Budapest is set to hold a FINA World Championships from 18 June – 3 July 2022, a move that ensures athletes have a global aquatics championship to target in the summer of 2022. The agreement was reached after approval from the FINA Bureau today." The 2022 championships in Budapest were to become the 19th edition, with the Fukuoka event postponed to 2023 to become the 20th edition of the FINA World Aquatics Championships.

== Venues ==
- Duna Aréna (swimming, diving and water polo finals)
- Lake Lupa (open water swimming)
- Tamás Széchy Swimming Complex (artistic swimming)
- Alfréd Hajós National Swimming Stadium (water polo)
- Debrecen Swimming Complex (water polo)
- Szeged Tiszavirág Pool (water polo)
- Sopron Lőver Pool (water polo)

== Schedule ==
A total of 74 medal events were held across five disciplines, one less than the 2019 Championships. In view of the training and recovery challenges of a busy 2022 aquatics calendar, FINA decided to reverse the schedule and present the event on a smaller scale than previous years with only the compulsory events, choosing to drop the high diving and beach water polo events. In addition, there was a reversal in the schedule, with swimming and artistic swimming (traditionally held in the last week) reallocated to the first week, and diving and open water swimming to the second.

●	Opening ceremony	●	Other competitions	●	Finals	●	Closing ceremony	M	Men's matches	W	Women's matches

June/July	17	18	19	20	21	22	23	24	25	26	27	28	29	30	1	2	3	Total
Ceremonies		●															●	-
Swimming		5	4	5	5	5	5	6	7									42
Open water swimming										1	2		2	2				7
Artistic swimming	●	1	1	2	1	1	1	1	2									10
Diving										1	1	2	3	2	1	1	2	13
Water polo				W	M	W	M	W	M	W	M	W	M	W	M	W	M	2
Total	0	6	5	7	6	6	6	7	9	2	3	2	5	4	1	2	3	74
Cumulative Total	0	6	11	18	24	30	36	43	52	54	57	59	64	68	69	71	74	74

== Participating nations ==
Out of 209 FINA members, 185 nations take part in the Championships, as well as the FINA Refugee Team. In March 2022, after the Russian invasion of Ukraine, FINA banned both the Russian and Belarusian nationals from entering the championships.

- Afghanistan (1)
- Albania (2)
- Algeria (2)
- Andorra (2)
- Angola (5)
- Antigua and Barbuda (4)
- Argentina (24)
- Armenia (4)
- Athlete Refugee Team (6)
- Aruba (5)
- Australia (88)
- Austria (16)
- Azerbaijan (2)
- Bahamas (4)
- Bahrain (4)
- Bangladesh (2)
- Barbados (3)
- Belgium (5)
- Benin (2)
- Bermuda (2)
- Bhutan (2)
- Bolivia (5)
- Bosnia and Herzegovina (2)
- Botswana (2)
- Brazil (71)
- Brunei (3)
- Bulgaria (8)
- Burkina Faso (2)
- Burundi (2)
- Cambodia (2)
- Cameroon (2)
- Canada (76)
- Cape Verde (2)
- Cayman Islands (2)
- Chile (5)
- China (51)
- Chinese Taipei (13)
- Colombia (31)
- Comoros (2)
- Cook Islands (3)
- Costa Rica (14)
- Croatia (18)
- Cuba (14)
- Curaçao (3)
- Cyprus (4)
- Czech Republic (8)
- Democratic Republic of the Congo (2)
- Denmark (5)
- Djibouti (2)
- Dominican Republic (4)
- Ecuador (7)
- Egypt (24)
- El Salvador (2)
- Equatorial Guinea (3)
- Estonia (7)
- Eswatini (2)
- Ethiopia (2)
- Faroe Islands (2)
- Federated States of Micronesia (3)
- Fiji (2)
- Finland (5)
- France (55)
- Gabon (1)
- Georgia (18)
- Germany (45)
- Ghana (3)
- Great Britain (45)
- Greece (59)
- Grenada (2)
- Guam (4)
- Guatemala (4)
- Guinea (1)
- Guyana (2)
- Haiti (2)
- Honduras (2)
- Hong Kong (13)
- Hungary (75)
- Iceland (2)
- India (9)
- Indonesia (6)
- Iran (2)
- Iraq (2)
- Ireland (4)
- Israel (26)
- Italy (84)
- Jamaica (3)
- Japan (58)
- Jordan (2)
- Kazakhstan (49)
- Kosovo (2)
- Kuwait (7)
- Kyrgyzstan (2)
- Laos (2)
- Latvia (5)
- Lebanon (4)
- Lesotho (1)
- Libya (1)
- Lithuania (8)
- Luxembourg (4)
- Madagascar (2)
- Malawi (3)
- Malaysia (13)
- Maldives (4)
- Mali (1)
- Malta (2)
- Marshall Islands (2)
- Mauritius (3)
- Mexico (36)
- Moldova (3)
- Monaco (2)
- Mongolia (4)
- Montenegro (15)
- Morocco (4)
- Mozambique (2)
- Nepal (2)
- Netherlands (36)
- New Zealand (42)
- Nicaragua (2)
- Niger (2)
- Nigeria (2)
- North Macedonia (3)
- Northern Mariana Islands (4)
- Norway (5)
- Oman (1)
- Pakistan (4)
- Palau (3)
- Palestine (4)
- Panama (4)
- Papua New Guinea (1)
- Paraguay (5)
- Peru (7)
- Philippines (3)
- Poland (16)
- Portugal (14)
- Puerto Rico (11)
- Qatar (2)
- Romania (4)
- Rwanda (2)
- Saint Kitts and Nevis (1)
- Saint Lucia (2)
- Saint Vincent and the Grenadines (2)
- Samoa (2)
- San Marino (5)
- Saudi Arabia (2)
- Senegal (3)
- Serbia (18)
- Seychelles (6)
- Singapore (27)
- Sint Maarten (2)
- Slovakia (20)
- Slovenia (6)
- Solomon Islands (1)
- South Africa (47)
- South Korea (32)
- Spain (50)
- Sri Lanka (1)
- Sudan (4)
- Suriname (2)
- Suspended Member Federation (2)
- Sweden (18)
- Switzerland (23)
- Syria (2)
- Tajikistan (2)
- Tanzania (2)
- Thailand (39)
- Tonga (2)
- Trinidad and Tobago (2)
- Tunisia (2)
- Turkey (14)
- Turkmenistan (2)
- Turks and Caicos Islands (1)
- Uganda (5)
- Ukraine (32)
- United Arab Emirates (2)
- United States (101)
- Uruguay (8)
- Uzbekistan (7)
- Venezuela (5)
- Vietnam (9)
- Virgin Islands (2)
- Yemen (2)
- Zambia (2)
- Zimbabwe (4)

== Medal table ==
* Host nation (Hungary)

Rank	Nation	Gold	Silver	Bronze	Total
1	United States	18	14	17	49
2	China	18	2	8	28
3	Italy	9	7	6	22
4	Australia	6	9	4	19
5	Canada	3	5	6	14
6	Japan	2	8	3	13
7	France	2	7	2	11
8	Ukraine	2	6	2	10
9	Germany	2	5	3	10
10	Hungary*	2	2	1	5
11	Sweden	2	2	0	4
12	Brazil	2	1	2	5
13	Romania	2	0	0	2
14	Great Britain	1	4	6	11
15	Netherlands	1	1	3	5
16	Lithuania	1	0	1	2
16	Spain	1	0	1	2
18	Poland	0	1	1	2
19	South Korea	0	1	0	1
20	Greece	0	0	3	3
21	Austria	0	0	2	2
21	Malaysia	0	0	2	2
23	South Africa	0	0	1	1
Totals (23 entries)		74	75	74	223
