= Emir Batur Albayrak =

Turkish swimmer (born 2007)

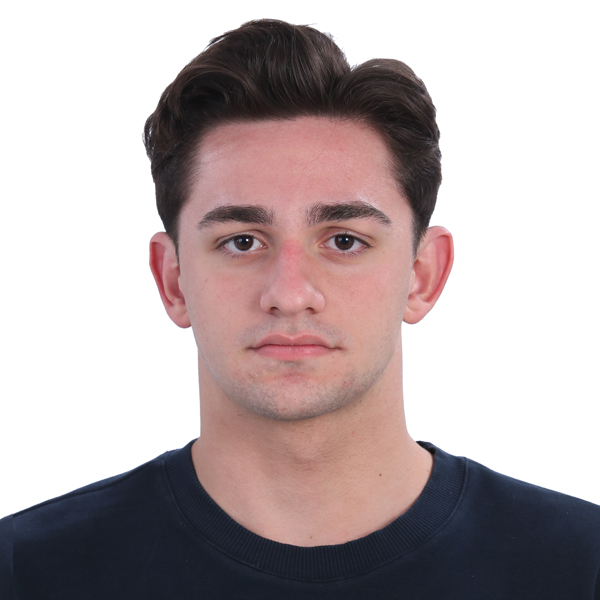

Personal information
- Born: 7 June 2007 (age 19) Antalya, Turkey
- Height: 1.78 m (5 ft 10 in)

Sport
- Country: Turkey
- Sport: Swimming
- Event: Freestyle
- Club: Antalyaspor Swimming
Medal record
Men's swimming
Representing Turkey
European Youth Olympic Festival
| Gold medal – first place | 2023 Maribor | 400 m freestyle |
| Silver medal – second place | 2022 Banská Bystrica | 1500 m freestyle |
European Junior Championships
| Bronze medal – third place | 2023 Belgrade | 1500 m freestyle |
| Bronze medal – third place | 2023 Belgrade | 4×200 m freestyle relay |
| Bronze medal – third place | 2022 Otopeni | 1500 m freestyle |
European Junior Open Water Championships
| Gold medal – first place | 2022 Setúbal | U16 5 km |
| Gold medal – first place | 2022 Setúbal | U16 Mixed team relay |

Emir Batur Albayrak (born 7 June 2007) is a Turkish Junior Olympian swimmer who specializes in the 1500 m freestyle swimming and marathon swimming events.

== Sport career ==
Albayrak is a member of Antalyaspor Swimming. He is 1.77 m (5 ft 9 1/2 in) tall.

=== 2020 ===
In 2020, Albayrak set new national records in the U13 400 m freestyle event with 8:14.46 and in the U13 800 m freestyle with 8:31.07.

=== 2022 ===
He captured the gold medal in the U16 5 km open water event with 1:06:41.7 at the 2022 LEN European Junior Open Water Championships held in Setúbal, Portugal. He won another gold medal in the U16 Mixed team relay event with his three teammates in 58:55.7.

He took the silver medal in the 1500 m freestyle event at the 2022 European Youth Olympic Festival in Banská Bystrica, Slovakia.

Albayrak won the bronze medal in the 1500 m freestyle event at the 2022 European Junior Championships in Otopeni, Romania. He improved his own national U16 record wşth 15:15.24.

He competed at the Open water swimming at the 2022 World Aquatics Championships in Budapest, Hungary, and ranked 20th in the 5 km event, and placed 12th in the Mixed team event with his three teammates.

At the 2022 FINA World Junior Open Water Swimming Championships in Mahé, Seychelles, he placed 7th in the U15 5 km event with his time 49:00.70. He and his teammates finished the 4x1500 m event on the 10th place.

=== 2023 ===
At the 2023 European Junior Championships in Belgrade, Serbia, he won bronze medals in the freestyle events of 1500 m, and 4×200 m.

He captured the gold medal in the 400 m freestyle event of the 2023 European Youth Summer Olympic Festival in Maribor, Slovenia, and set a festival boys record with 3:51.29.

=== 2024 ===
He competed at the 2024 World Aquatics Championships in Doha, Qatar. In the 400 m freestyle, and the 1500 m freestyle events, he failed to advance to the final. At the Open water swimming competitions of the same championships, he finished the 5 km event on the 18th place, and ranked in the 10 km event on the 27th place. He and his three teammates finished the Team event on the 16th place.

Albayrak received a quota for participation at the 2024 Summer Olympics in Paris, France. He competed in the 1500 m freestyle, and failed to advance to the finals. He did not finish the marathon 10 km event. He became the World Champion in the 7.5 km event in the 16–17 age category at the World Junior Open Water Swimming Championships held in Italy.

== Personal life ==
Emir Batur Albayrak was born on 7 June 2007. He is a high school student at Doğa Schools in Antalya.
