= İskender Başlakov =

Turkish swimmer (born 1990)

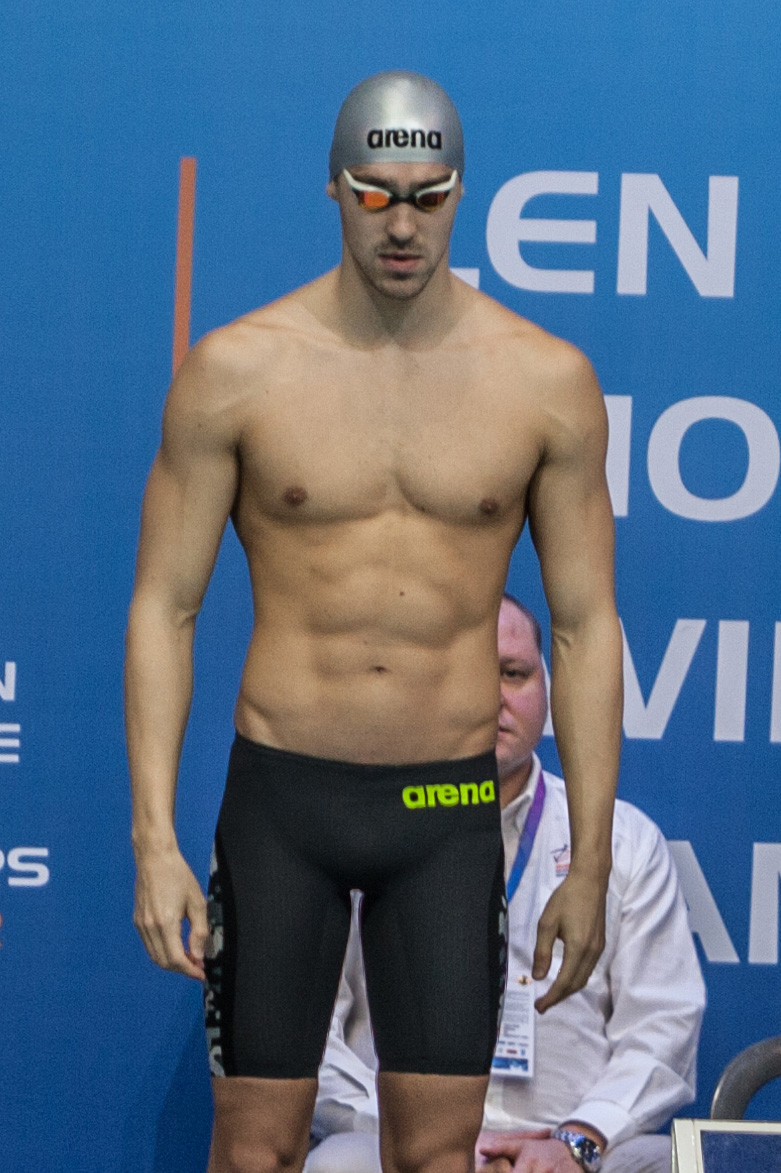

Personal information
- Nationality: Turkish
- Born: 7 February 1990 (age 36)

Sport
- Sport: Swimming
Medal record
Representing Turkey
Mediterranean Games
Silver medal – second place	2013 Mersin	4x100m freestyle relay
Bronze medal – third place	2018 Tarragona	4x100m freestyle relay
Islamic Solidarity Games
Gold medal – first place	2017 Baku	4x100m freestyle relay
Bronze medal – third place	2017 Baku	50m backstroke

İskender Başlakov (born 7 February 1990) is a Turkish swimmer. He competed in the men's 50 metre backstroke event at the 2018 FINA World Swimming Championships (25 m), in Hangzhou, China.
