= Taishin Minamide =

Japanese swimmer

Personal information
- Nationality: Japan
- Born: 13 April 1996 (age 30) Kainan, Japan

Sport
- Sport: Swimming
- Event: Marathon swimming

Taishin Minamide (南出大伸, Minamide Taishin, born 13 April 1996) is a Japanese marathon swimmer. He competed in the 2020 Summer Olympics and the 2024 Paris Olympics.
