= Turkish Swimming Federation =

Sports governing body in Turkey

Turkish Swimming Federation Türkiye Yüzme Federasyonu
- Sport: Swimming, diving, synchronized swimming and open water swimming
- Abbreviation: TYF
- Founded: 1957
- Affiliation: FINA
- Location: Ankara, Turkey
- President: Erkan Yalçın

Official website
- www.tyf.gov.tr

The Turkish Swimming Federation (Turkish: Türkiye Yüzme Federasyonu, TYF) is the governing body of swimming, diving, synchronized swimming, water polo and open water swimming in Turkey since 1957.

The TYF is a member of the LEN (European Swimming League), FINA (International Swimming Federation) and Turkish Olympic Committee. It is based in Ankara and its current chairman is Associate Erkan Yalçın.

The TYF organizes aquatic sports competitions at national, European and world level in all categories for men and women of recognized age classes.

== International events hosted ==
- 1999 European Aquatics Championships - 26 July-1 August, Istanbul
- 2009 European Short Course Swimming Championships - 10–13 December, Istanbul
- Swimming at the 2011 European Youth Summer Olympic Festival - 25–29 July, Trabzon
- 2012 European Junior Open Water Swimming Championships - 13–15 July, İzmit
- 2012 FINA World Swimming Championships (25 m) - 12–16 December, Istanbul

== See also ==
- List of Turkish records in swimming
