= Thailand at the 2025 World Aquatics Championships =

- Flag of Thailand
- World Aquatics code: THA
- National federation: Thailand Swimming Association
- Website: thailandswimming.org

in Singapore
- Competitors: 24 in 4 sports
- Medals: Gold 0 Silver 0 Bronze 0 Total 0

World Aquatics Championships appearances
- 1973; 1975; 1978; 1982; 1986; 1991; 1994; 1998; 2001; 2003; 2005; 2007; 2009; 2011; 2013; 2015; 2017; 2019; 2022; 2023; 2024; 2025

Thailand competed at the 2025 World Aquatics Championships in Singapore from July 11 to August 3, 2025.

== Competitors ==
The following is the list of competitors in the Championships.

Sport	Men	Women	Total
Artistic swimming	2	9	11
Diving	1	0	1
Open water swimming	2	2*	4*
Swimming	4	5*	9*
Total	9	15*	24*

- Kamonchanok Kwanmuang competed in both open water swimming and pool swimming.

== Artistic swimming ==
Men

Athlete	Event	Preliminaries		Final	
Athlete	Event	Points	Rank	Points	Rank
Kantinan Adisaisiributr	Solo technical routine	—		192.4416	12
Wattikorn Khethirankanok	Solo free routine	—		129.7475	13

Women

Athlete	Event	Preliminaries		Final	
Athlete	Event	Points	Rank	Points	Rank
Patrawee Chayawararak	Solo technical routine	194.8100	27	Did not advance	

Mixed

Athlete	Event	Preliminaries		Final	
Athlete	Event	Points	Rank	Points	Rank
Kantinan Adisaisiributr; Pongpimporn Pongsuwan	Duet technical routine	—		185.4400	10
Kantinan Adisaisiributr; Supitchaya Songpan	Duet free routine	—		254.7522	8
Kantinan Adisaisiributr; Patrawee Chayawararak; Nannapat Duangprasert; Kanyanatt Kaewvisit; Pongpimporn Pongsuwan; Getsarin Sawangarom; Supitchaya Songpan; Voranan Toomchay	Team technical routine	204.3100	22	Did not advance	
Kantinan Adisaisiributr; Patrawee Chayawararak; Nannapat Duangprasert; Kanyanatt Kaewvisit; Pongpimporn Pongsuwan; Getsarin Sawangarom; Supitchaya Songpan; Voranan Toomchay	Team free routine	213.9607	16	Did not advance	
Jinnipha Adisaisiributr; Kantinan Adisaisiributr; Patrawee Chayawararak; Chantaras Jarupraditlert; Wattikorn Khethirankanok; Pongpimporn Pongsuwan; Getsarin Sawangarom; Supitchaya Songpan	Team acrobatic routine	165.9060	17	Did not advance	

== Diving ==
Men

Athlete	Event	Preliminaries		Semifinals		Final	
Athlete	Event	Points	Rank	Points	Rank	Points	Rank
Chawanwat Juntaphadawon	1 m springboard	254.50	51	—		Did not advance	
Chawanwat Juntaphadawon	3 m springboard	357.00	29	Did not advance			

== Open water swimming ==
Men

Athlete	Event	Heat		Semi-final		Final	
Athlete	Event	Time	Rank	Time	Rank	Time	Rank
Nithikorn Jeampiriyakul	Men's 5 km	—				1:07:19.0	63
Nithikorn Jeampiriyakul	Men's 10 km	—				2:26:06.8	60
Ratthawit Thammananthachote	Men's 3 km knockout sprints	17:10.1	11	Did not advance			
Ratthawit Thammananthachote	Men's 5 km	—				58:13.7	16
Ratthawit Thammananthachote	Men's 10 km	—				2:11:51.8	45

Women

Athlete	Event	Heat		Semi-final		Final	
Athlete	Event	Time	Rank	Time	Rank	Time	Rank
Chonpasanop Chatwuti	Women's 5 km	—				1:11:42.7	49
Chonpasanop Chatwuti	Women's 10 km	—				Did not finish	
Kamonchanok Kwanmuang	Women's 10 km	—				Did not finish	

Mixed

Athlete	Event	Final	
Athlete	Event	Time	Rank
Ratthawit Thammananthachote; Kamonchanok Kwanmuang; Chonpasanop Chatwuti; Nithikorn Jeampiriyakul	Team relay	1:16:37.3	18

== Swimming ==
Thailand entered 9 swimmers.

Men

Athlete	Event	Heat		Semi-final		Final	
Athlete	Event	Time	Rank	Time	Rank	Time	Rank
Dulyawat Kaewsriyong	100 m freestyle	52.68	70	Did not advance			
Dulyawat Kaewsriyong	50 m butterfly	25.69	70	Did not advance			
Tonnam Kanteemool	50 m backstroke	26.10	50	Did not advance			
Tonnam Kanteemool	100 m backstroke	56.53	43	Did not advance			
Pongpanod Trithan	200 m freestyle	1:51.66	45	Did not advance			
Navaphat Wongcharoen	100 m butterfly	54.76	50	Did not advance			
Navaphat Wongcharoen	200 m butterfly	2:08.24	34	Did not advance			

Women

Athlete	Event	Heat		Semi-final		Final	
Athlete	Event	Time	Rank	Time	Rank	Time	Rank
Saovanee Boonamphai	50 m backstroke	29.17	31	Did not advance			
Saovanee Boonamphai	100 m backstroke	1:04.87	41	Did not advance			
Kamonchanok Kwanmuang	200 m freestyle	2:03.05	36	Did not advance			
Kamonchanok Kwanmuang	200 m butterfly	2:12.13	18	Did not advance			
Kamonchanok Kwanmuang	200 m individual medley	2:19.11	31	Did not advance			
Kamonchanok Kwanmuang	400 m individual medley	4:53.21	20	—		Did not advance	
Mia Millar	100 m freestyle	57.81	44	Did not advance			
Mia Millar	200 m backstroke	2:18.50	33	Did not advance			
Napatsawan Jaritkla	50 m butterfly	28.29	49	Did not advance			
Napatsawan Jaritkla	100 m butterfly	1:01.00	35	Did not advance			
Jenjira Srisaard	50 m freestyle	25.75	37	Did not advance			
Jenjira Srisaard	50 m breaststroke	31.83	32	Did not advance			
