= Barbados at the 2025 World Aquatics Championships =

- Flag of Barbados
- World Aquatics code: BAR
- National federation: Barbados Amateur Swimming Association
- Website: www.swimbarbados.com

in Singapore
- Competitors: 2 in 1 sport
- Medals: Gold 0 Silver 0 Bronze 0 Total 0

World Aquatics Championships appearances
- 1973; 1975; 1978; 1982; 1986; 1991; 1994; 1998; 2001; 2003; 2005; 2007; 2009; 2011; 2013; 2015; 2017; 2019; 2022; 2023; 2024; 2025

Barbados will compete at the 2025 World Aquatics Championships in Singapore from July 11 to August 3, 2025.

== Swimming ==
Barbadian swimmers have achieved qualifying standards in the following events.

Men

Athlete	Event	Heat		Semifinal		Final	
Athlete	Event	Time	Rank	Time	Rank	Time	Rank
Christien Kelly	50 m freestyle	24.27	75	Did not advance			
Christien Kelly	50 m butterfly	25.51	64	Did not advance			
Luis Sebastian Weekes	100 m breaststroke	1:06.80	64	Did not advance			
