= Ivory Coast at the 2025 World Aquatics Championships =

- Flag of Ivory Coast
- World Aquatics code: CIV
- National federation: Ivorian Federation of Swimming and Rescue

in Singapore
- Competitors: 2 in 1 sport
- Medals: Gold 0 Silver 0 Bronze 0 Total 0

World Aquatics Championships appearances
- 2001; 2003; 2005; 2007; 2009; 2011; 2013; 2015; 2017; 2019; 2022; 2023; 2024; 2025

Ivory Coast is competing at the 2025 World Aquatics Championships in Singapore from 11 July to 3 August 2025.

== Competitors ==
The following is the list of competitors in the Championships.

Sport	Men	Women	Total
Swimming	2	0	2
Total	2	0	2

== Swimming ==
Men

Athlete	Event	Heat		Semifinal		Final	
Athlete	Event	Time	Rank	Time	Rank	Time	Rank
Alfousseni Fofana	100 m freestyle	1:14.15	109	Did not advance			
Alfousseni Fofana	100 m breaststroke	DNS					
Lassine Ben Traoré	50 m freestyle	26.84	99	Did not advance			
Lassine Ben Traoré	50 m butterfly	30.34	95	Did not advance			
