= Thailand at the 2022 World Aquatics Championships =

- Flag of Thailand
- FINA code: THA
- National federation: Thailand Swimming Association
- Website: thailandswimming.org

in Budapest, Hungary
- Competitors: 39 in 5 sports
- Medals: Gold 0 Silver 0 Bronze 0 Total 0

World Aquatics Championships appearances
- 1973; 1975; 1978; 1982; 1986; 1991; 1994; 1998; 2001; 2003; 2005; 2007; 2009; 2011; 2013; 2015; 2017; 2019; 2022; 2023; 2024

Thailand competed at the 2022 World Aquatics Championships in Budapest, Hungary from 18 June to 3 July.

== Artistic swimming ==
Thailand entered 12 artistic swimmers.

Women

Athlete	Event	Preliminaries		Final	
Athlete	Event	Points	Rank	Points	Rank
Patrawee Chayawararak	Solo free routine	70.1000	23	Did not advance	
Pongpimporn Pongsuwan; Supitchaya Songpan	Duet technical routine	66.5138	28	Did not advance	
Pongpimporn Pongsuwan; Supitchaya Songpan	Duet free routine	69.0000	28	Did not advance	
Jinnipha Adisaisiributr; Patrawee Chayawararak; Nannapat Duangprasert; Chantaras Jarupraditlert; Pongpimporn Pongsuwan; Patcharaporn Somyos; Supitchaya Songpan; Voranan Toomchay	Team free routine	68.5333	19	Did not advance	
Jinnipha Adisaisiributr; Patrawee Chayawararak; Nannapat Duangprasert; Chantaras Jarupraditlert; Pongpimporn Pongsuwan; Nicharada Sakulmethanon; Chalisa Sinsawat; Patcharaporn Somyos; Supitchaya Songpan; Nichapa Takiennut	Free routine combination	67.5000	10 Q	68.5667	10
Jinnipha Adisaisiributr; Patrawee Chayawararak; Nannapat Duangprasert; Chantaras Jarupraditlert; Pongpimporn Pongsuwan; Chalisa Sinsawat; Patcharaporn Somyos; Supitchaya Songpan; Nichapa Takiennut; Voranan Toomchay	Highlight routine	70.7000	14	Did not advance	

Mixed

Athlete	Event	Preliminaries		Final	
Athlete	Event	Points	Rank	Points	Rank
Kantinan Adisaisiributr; Voranan Toomchay	Duet technical routine	65.2202	12 Q	67.3477	11
Kantinan Adisaisiributr; Voranan Toomchay	Duet free routine	67.4333	10 Q	68.1333	10

== Diving ==
Thailand entered 1 diver.

Men

Athlete	Event	Preliminaries		Semifinals		Final	
Athlete	Event	Points	Rank	Points	Rank	Points	Rank
Chawanwat Juntaphadawo	1 m springboard	228.50	48	—		Did not advance	
Chawanwat Juntaphadawo	3 m springboard	333.70	33	Did not advance			

== Open water swimming ==
Thailand entered 4 open water swimmers (2 male and 2 female)

Men

Athlete	Event	Time	Rank
Tanakrit Kittiya	10 km	2:03:05.6	44
Suabsakul Kumton	10 km	2:17:49.7	56

Women

Athlete	Event	Time	Rank
Natwara Bavornsukseri	10 km	2:27:59.5	7
Pimpun Choopong	10 km	2:15:32.4	47

== Swimming ==
Thailand entered 9 swimmers.

Men

Athlete	Event	Heat		Semifinal		Final	
Athlete	Event	Time	Rank	Time	Rank	Time	Rank
Dulyawat Kaewsriyong	100 metre freestyle	51.29	56	Did not advance			
Dulyawat Kaewsriyong	200 metre individual medley	2:13.78	40	Did not advance			
Tonnam Kanteemool	400 metre freestyle	3:56.96	31	—		Did not advance	
Tonnam Kanteemool	1500 metre freestyle	16:09.28	21	—		Did not advance	
Ratthawit Thammananthachote	800 metre freestyle	8:35.86	29	—		Did not advance	
Ratthawit Thammananthachote	200 metre backstroke	2:07.12	29	Did not advance			
Navaphat Wongcharoen	100 metre butterfly	53.20	33	Did not advance			
Navaphat Wongcharoen	200 metre butterfly	2:02.10	35	Did not advance			
Dulyawat Kaewsriyong; Tonnam Kanteemool; Ratthawit Thammananthachote; Navaphat Wongcharoen	4 × 100 metre freestyle relay	3:26.85	16	—		Did not advance	
Dulyawat Kaewsriyong; Tonnam Kanteemool; Ratthawit Thammananthachote; Navaphat Wongcharoen	4 × 200 metre freestyle relay	7:40.27	14	—		Did not advance	

Women

Athlete	Event	Heat		Semifinal		Final	
Athlete	Event	Time	Rank	Time	Rank	Time	Rank
Kamonchanok Kwanmuang	200 metre freestyle	2:07.20	31	—		Did not advance	
Kamonchanok Kwanmuang	400 metre freestyle	4:27.01	26	—		Did not advance	
Kamonchanok Kwanmuang	400 metre individual medley	4:56.59	17	—		Did not advance	
Yarinda Sunthornrangsri	1500 metre freestyle	17:26.95	24	—		Did not advance	
Yarinda Sunthornrangsri	200 metre backstroke	DNS		—		Did not advance	
Phiangkhwan Pawapotako	100 metre breaststroke	1:13.23	42	Did not advance			
Phiangkhwan Pawapotako	200 metre breaststroke	DNS		Did not advance			
Jenjira Srisaard	50 metre freestyle	26.13	30	Did not advance			
Jenjira Srisaard	50 metre butterfly	27.21	31	Did not advance			
Jenjira Srisaard	50 metre breaststroke	32.58	35	Did not advance			
Jinjutha Pholjamjumrus	200 metre butterfly	2:15.89	21	Did not advance			
Jinjutha Pholjamjumrus	200 metre individual medley	2:20.38	32	—		Did not advance	
Jenjira Srisaard; Kamonchanok Kwanmuang; Phiangkhwan Pawapotako; Jinjutha Pholjamjumrus	4 × 100 metre freestyle relay	4:00.22	11	—		Did not advance	
Thailand Team	4 × 100 metre medley relay	DNS		—		Did not advance	

Mixed

Athlete	Event	Heat		Final	
Athlete	Event	Time	Rank	Time	Rank
Dulyawat Kaewsriyong; Navaphat Wongcharoen; Jinjutha Pholjamjumrus; Jenjira Srisaard	4 × 100 metre mixed freestyle relay	3:43.33	18	Did not advance	
Jinjutha Pholjamjumrus; Dulyawat Kaewsriyong; Navaphat Wongcharoen; Yarinda Sunthornrangsri	4 × 100 metre mixed medley relay	4:09.28	20	Did not advance	

== Water polo ==
Summary

Team	Event	Group stage				Playoff	Quarterfinal	Semifinal	Final / BM	
Team	Event	Opposition Score	Opposition Score	Opposition Score	Rank	Opposition Score	Opposition Score	Opposition Score	Opposition Score	Rank
Thailand	Women's tournament	Greece; L 1–28	France; L 8–24	Spain; L 2–30	4	—	—	Brazil; L 9–12	Colombia; W 10–6	15

=== Women's tournament ===
Team roster

The following is Thai roster in the Water polo at the 2022 World Aquatics Championships – Women's tournament.

Head coach: (Uzbekistan) Natalya Rustamova

- 1 Napason Mouksung GK
- 2 Thanidakarn Kwantongtanaree FP
- 3 Poonnada Rotchanarut FP
- 4 Wataniya Nilklad FP
- 5 Nattamon Khamma FP
- 6 Kornkarn Puengpongsakul FP
- 7 Kritsana Puangtong FP
- 8 Benyakorn Khunprathum FP
- 9 Raksina Rueangsappaisan FP
- 10 Issaree Turon FP
- 11 Yanisa Turon FP
- 12 Panchita Rodwattanadisakul FP
- 13 Phanthila Arsayuth GK

Group play

Pos	Team	Pld	W	D	L	GF	GA	GD	Pts	Qualification
1	Greece	3	2	1	0	53	15	+38	5 (Note: Spain 10–10 Greece)	Quarterfinals
2	Spain	3	2	1	0	58	20	+38	5	Playoffs
3	France	3	1	0	2	36	41	−5	2	Playoffs
4	Thailand	3	0	0	3	11	82	−71	0	

Source: Sportresult
Rules for classification: 1) points; 2) head-to-head points; 3) head-to-head goal difference; 4) head-to-head number of goals scored; 5) Goal difference.
Notes:

20 June 2022; 18:00	Report	Greece	28–1	Thailand	Szeged Tiszavirag Pool, Szeged; Referees: Helene Painchaud (CAN), Fabio Toffoli (BRA)
20 June 2022; 18:00	Report	Score by quarters: 7–0, 9–0, 5–0, 7–1			Szeged Tiszavirag Pool, Szeged; Referees: Helene Painchaud (CAN), Fabio Toffoli (BRA)
20 June 2022; 18:00	Report	Xenaki 5	Goals	Puangtong 1	Szeged Tiszavirag Pool, Szeged; Referees: Helene Painchaud (CAN), Fabio Toffoli (BRA)

22 June 2022; 19:30	Report	Thailand	8–24	France	Szeged Tiszavirag Pool, Szeged; Referees: Hélène Painchaud (CAN), Fabio Toffoli (BRA)
22 June 2022; 19:30	Report	Score by quarters: 2–6, 2–7, 0–7, 4–4			Szeged Tiszavirag Pool, Szeged; Referees: Hélène Painchaud (CAN), Fabio Toffoli (BRA)
22 June 2022; 19:30	Report	Puangtong 4	Goals	Guillet 6	Szeged Tiszavirag Pool, Szeged; Referees: Hélène Painchaud (CAN), Fabio Toffoli (BRA)

24 June 2022; 18:00	Report	Thailand	2–30	Spain	Szeged Tiszavirag Pool, Szeged; Referees: Fabio Toffoli (BRA), Veselin Mišković (MNE)
24 June 2022; 18:00	Report	Score by quarters: 0–5, 0–7, 2–11, 0–7			Szeged Tiszavirag Pool, Szeged; Referees: Fabio Toffoli (BRA), Veselin Mišković (MNE)
24 June 2022; 18:00	Report	Puangtong 2	Goals	Forca 7	Szeged Tiszavirag Pool, Szeged; Referees: Fabio Toffoli (BRA), Veselin Mišković (MNE)

13–16th place semifinals

26 June 2022; 18:30	Report	Brazil	12–9	Thailand	Szeged Tiszavirag Pool, Szeged; Referees: Megan Perry (NZL), Anbar Anbar (KUW)
26 June 2022; 18:30	Report	Score by quarters: 4–1, 4–1, 3–3, 1–4			Szeged Tiszavirag Pool, Szeged; Referees: Megan Perry (NZL), Anbar Anbar (KUW)
26 June 2022; 18:30	Report	Ferreira 6	Goals	Puangton, Turon 4	Szeged Tiszavirag Pool, Szeged; Referees: Megan Perry (NZL), Anbar Anbar (KUW)

15th place game

28 June 2022; 14:00	Report	Colombia	6–10	Thailand	Szeged Tiszavirag Pool, Szeged; Referees: Asumi Tsuzaki (JPN), Agustin Pinski (ARG)
28 June 2022; 14:00	Report	Score by quarters: 2–2, 2–1, 2–2, 0–5			Szeged Tiszavirag Pool, Szeged; Referees: Asumi Tsuzaki (JPN), Agustin Pinski (ARG)
28 June 2022; 14:00	Report	Restrepo 5	Goals	Puengpongsakul 3	Szeged Tiszavirag Pool, Szeged; Referees: Asumi Tsuzaki (JPN), Agustin Pinski (ARG)
