= Thailand at the 2023 World Aquatics Championships =

- Flag of Thailand
- FINA code: THA
- National federation: Thailand Swimming Association
- Website: thailandswimming.org

in Fukuoka, Japan
- Competitors: 23 in 4 sports
- Medals: Gold 0 Silver 0 Bronze 0 Total 0

World Aquatics Championships appearances
- 1973; 1975; 1978; 1982; 1986; 1991; 1994; 1998; 2001; 2003; 2005; 2007; 2009; 2011; 2013; 2015; 2017; 2019; 2022; 2023; 2024

Thailand is set to compete at the 2023 World Aquatics Championships in Fukuoka, Japan from 14 to 30 July.

== Artistic swimming ==
Men

Athlete	Event	Preliminaries		Final	
Athlete	Event	Points	Rank	Points	Rank
Kantinan Adisaisiributr	Solo technical routine	157.5800	8 Q	180.1168	6
Kantinan Adisaisiributr	Solo free routine	136.0416	8 Q	139.9063	7

Women

Athlete	Event	Preliminaries		Final	
Athlete	Event	Points	Rank	Points	Rank
Patrawee Chayawararak	Solo technical routine	168.1863	19	Did not advance	
Patrawee Chayawararak	Solo free routine	135.0437	17	Did not advance	
Pongpimporn Pongsuwan; Supitchaya Songpan	Duet technical routine	175.2599	26	Did not advance	
Pongpimporn Pongsuwan; Supitchaya Songpan	Duet free routine	134.4812	25	Did not advance	

Mixed

Athlete	Event	Preliminaries		Final	
Athlete	Event	Points	Rank	Points	Rank
Kantinan Adisaisiributr; Voranan Toomchay	Duet technical routine	162.9283	14	Did not advance	
Kantinan Adisaisiributr; Voranan Toomchay	Duet free routine	138.1084	9 Q	135.6167	8
Jinnipha Adisaisiributr; Patrawee Chayawararak; Nannapat Duangprasert; Chantaras Jarupraditlert; Pongpimporn Pongsuwan; Chalisa Sinsawat; Supitchaya Songpan; Nichapa Takiennut	Team acrobatic routine	122.7601	19	Did not advance	
Jinnipha Adisaisiributr; Patrawee Chayawararak; Nannapat Duangprasert; Chantaras Jarupraditlert; Pongpimporn Pongsuwan; Chalisa Sinsawat; Supitchaya Songpan; Voranan Toomchay	Team technical routine	152.9763	22	Did not advance	
Jinnipha Adisaisiributr; Kantinan Adisaisiributr; Patrawee Chayawararak; Nannapat Duangprasert; Chantaras Jarupraditlert; Pongpimporn Pongsuwan; Supitchaya Songpan; Voranan Toomchay	Team free routine	159.0417	16	Did not advance	

== Diving ==
Thailand entered 1 diver.

Men

Athlete	Event	Preliminaries		Semifinals		Final	
Athlete	Event	Points	Rank	Points	Rank	Points	Rank
Chawanwat Juntaphadawon	3 m springboard	295.75	50	Did not advance			

== Open water swimming ==
Thailand entered 4 open water swimmers.

Men

Athlete	Event	Time	Rank
Tanakrit Kittiya	Men's 10 km	2:05:07.4	53
Khomchan Wichachai	Men's 10 km	DNF	

Women

Athlete	Event	Time	Rank
Thitirat Charoensup	Women's 10 km	2:22:17.3	53
Pimpun Choopong	Women's 10 km	2:18:23.0	48

== Swimming ==
Thailand entered 8 swimmers.

Men

Athlete	Event	Heat		Semifinal		Final	
Athlete	Event	Time	Rank	Time	Rank	Time	Rank
Dulyawat Kaewsriyong	100 metre freestyle	50.64	52	Did not advance			
Dulyawat Kaewsriyong	200 metre freestyle	1:52.24	43	Did not advance			
Tonnam Kanteemool	400 metre freestyle	3:56.69	34	—		Did not advance	
Tonnam Kanteemool	50 metre backstroke	26.39	40	Did not advance			
Tonnam Kanteemool	200 metre backstroke	2:03.46	30	Did not advance			
Ratthawit Thammananthachote	800 metre freestyle	8:14.87	34	—		Did not advance	
Ratthawit Thammananthachote	1500 metre freestyle	15:39.46	24	—		Did not advance	
Navaphat Wongcharoen	100 metre butterfly	53.84	43	Did not advance			
Navaphat Wongcharoen	200 metre butterfly	2:03.05	29	Did not advance			
Dulyawat Kaewsriyong; Navaphat Wongcharoen; Ratthawit Thammananthachote; Tonnam Kanteemool	4 × 100 m freestyle relay	3:27.18	20	—		Did not advance	
Dulyawat Kaewsriyong; Tonnam Kanteemool; Ratthawit Thammananthachote; Navaphat Wongcharoen	4 × 200 m freestyle relay	7:39.28	16	—		Did not advance	
Tonnam Kanteemool; Dulyawat Kaewsriyong; Navaphat Wongcharoen; Ratthawit Thammananthachote	4 × 100 m medley relay	3:52.53	21	—		Did not advance	

Women

Athlete	Event	Heat		Semifinal		Final	
Athlete	Event	Time	Rank	Time	Rank	Time	Rank
Saovanee Boonamphai	50 metre backstroke	29.46	38	Did not advance			
Saovanee Boonamphai	100 metre backstroke	1:04.53	44	Did not advance			
Kamonchanok Kwanmuang	200 metre freestyle	2:02.22	38	Did not advance			
Kamonchanok Kwanmuang	200 metre butterfly	2:12.46	20	Did not advance			
Kamonchanok Kwanmuang	200 metre individual medley	2:18.02	30	Did not advance			
Kamonchanok Kwanmuang	400 metre individual medley	4:48.97	24	—		Did not advance	
Phiangkhwan Pawapotako	100 metre breaststroke	1:11.78	44	Did not advance			
Phiangkhwan Pawapotako	200 metre breaststroke	2:35.12	26	Did not advance			
Jenjira Srisaard	50 metre freestyle	25.70	35	Did not advance			
Jenjira Srisaard	50 metre breaststroke	32.02	33	Did not advance			
Jenjira Srisaard	50 metre butterfly	26.78	28	Did not advance			
Kamonchanok Kwanmuang; Saovanee Boonamphai; Phiangkhwan Pawapotako; Jenjira Srisaard	4 × 100 m freestyle relay	3:56.84	18	—		Did not advance	
Saovanee Boonamphai; Phiangkhwan Pawapotako; Kamonchanok Kwanmuang; Jenjira Srisaard	4 × 100 m medley relay	4:20.43	23	—		Did not advance	

Mixed

Athlete	Event	Heat		Final	
Athlete	Event	Time	Rank	Time	Rank
Dulyawat Kaewsriyong; Tonnam Kanteemool; Kamonchanok Kwanmuang; Jenjira Srisaard	4 × 100 m freestyle relay	3:39.38	25	Did not advance	
Saovanee Boonamphai; Dulyawat Kaewsriyong; Navaphat Wongcharoen; Kamonchanok Kwanmuang	4 × 100 m medley relay	4:05.03	26	Did not advance	
