= Thailand at the 2024 World Aquatics Championships =

- Flag of Thailand
- FINA code: THA
- National federation: Thailand Swimming Association
- Website: thailandswimming.org

in Doha, Qatar
- Competitors: 19 in 4 sports
- Medals: Gold 0 Silver 0 Bronze 0 Total 0

World Aquatics Championships appearances
- 1973; 1975; 1978; 1982; 1986; 1991; 1994; 1998; 2001; 2003; 2005; 2007; 2009; 2011; 2013; 2015; 2017; 2019; 2022; 2023; 2024

Thailand competed at the 2024 World Aquatics Championships in Doha, Qatar from 2 to 18 February.

== Competitors ==
The following is the list of competitors in the Championships.

Sport	Men	Women	Total
Artistic swimming	2	8	10
Diving	1	0	1
Open water swimming	2*	2*	4*
Swimming	4*	3*	7*
Total	7*	12*	19*

Ratthawit Thammananthachote, Navaphat Wongcharoen, Kamonchanok Kwanmuang competed in both open water swimming and pool swimming.

== Artistic swimming ==
Men

Athlete	Event	Preliminaries		Final	
Athlete	Event	Points	Rank	Points	Rank
Kantinan Adisaisiributr	Solo technical routine	177.3216	11 Q	188.7716	9
Kantinan Adisaisiributr	Solo free routine	152.8916	5 Q	150.2583	6

Women

Athlete	Event	Preliminaries		Final	
Athlete	Event	Points	Rank	Points	Rank
Patrawee Chayawararak	Solo technical routine	188.1168	20	Did not advance	
Patrawee Chayawararak	Solo free routine	153.9583	22	Did not advance	
Pongpimporn Pongsuwan; Supitchaya Songpan	Duet technical routine	186.9250	31	Did not advance	
Pongpimporn Pongsuwan; Supitchaya Songpan	Duet free routine	153.1542	23	Did not advance	

Mixed

Athlete	Event	Preliminaries		Final	
Athlete	Event	Points	Rank	Points	Rank
Kantinan Adisaisiributr; Voranan Toomchay	Duet technical routine	187.0349	11 Q	183.6733	11
Kantinan Adisaisiributr; Voranan Toomchay	Duet free routine	135.4730	8 Q	144.5978	7
Jinnipha Adisaisiributr; Patrawee Chayawararak; Nannapat Duangprasert; Chantaras Jarupraditlert; Pongpimporn Pongsuwan; Chalisa Sinsawat; Supitchaya Songpan; Voranan Toomchay	Team technical routine	189.9891	12 Q	187.8733	12
Jinnipha Adisaisiributr; Kantinan Adisaisiributr; Patrawee Chayawararak; Nannapat Duangprasert; Chantaras Jarupraditlert; Pongpimporn Pongsuwan; Supitchaya Songpan; Voranan Toomchay	Team free routine	186.8813	14	Did not advance	
Jinnipha Adisaisiributr; Kantinan Adisaisiributr; Patrawee Chayawararak; Chantaras Jarupraditlert; Wattikorn Khethirankanok; Pongpimporn Pongsuwan; Supitchaya Songpan; Voranan Toomchay	Team acrobatic routine	161.9300	17	Did not advance	

== Diving ==
Men

Athlete	Event	Preliminaries		Semifinals		Final	
Athlete	Event	Points	Rank	Points	Rank	Points	Rank
Chawanwat Juntaphadawon	3 m springboard	276.30	53	Did not advance			

== Open water swimming ==
Men

Athlete	Event	Time	Rank
Ratthawit Thammananthachote	Men's 10 km	1:54:02.0	47
Navaphat Wongcharoen	Men's 10 km	2:09:34.0	73

Women

Athlete	Event	Time	Rank
Pimpun Choopong	Women's 10 km	2:17:34.9	59
Kamonchanok Kwanmuang	Women's 10 km	2:07:42.1	49

== Swimming ==
Thailand entered 7 swimmers.

Men

Athlete	Event	Heat		Semifinal		Final	
Athlete	Event	Time	Rank	Time	Rank	Time	Rank
Dulyawat Kaewsriyong	100 metre freestyle	50.35	36	Did not advance			
Dulyawat Kaewsriyong	200 metre freestyle	1:53.01	45	Did not advance			
Dulyawat Kaewsriyong	200 metre individual medley	2:14.64	36	Did not advance			
Tonnam Kanteemool	400 metre freestyle	4:09.41	50	—		Did not advance	
Ratthawit Thammananthachote	800 metre freestyle	8:06.82 NR	32	—		Did not advance	
Ratthawit Thammananthachote	1500 metre freestyle	15:38.84	28	—		Did not advance	
Navaphat Wongcharoen	100 metre butterfly	53.27	26	Did not advance			
Navaphat Wongcharoen	200 metre butterfly	1:59.78	25	Did not advance			
Dulyawat Kaewsriyong; Navaphat Wongcharoen; Ratthawit Thammananthachote; Tonnam Kanteemool	4 × 100 m freestyle relay	3:26.59	18	—		Did not advance	
Dulyawat Kaewsriyong; Navaphat Wongcharoen; Ratthawit Thammananthachote; Tonnam Kanteemool	4 × 200 m freestyle relay	7:31.92	14	—		Did not advance	
Dulyawat Kaewsriyong; Navaphat Wongcharoen; Ratthawit Thammananthachote; Tonnam Kanteemool	4 × 100 m medley relay	3:51.52	21	—		Did not advance	

Women

Athlete	Event	Heat		Semifinal		Final	
Athlete	Event	Time	Rank	Time	Rank	Time	Rank
Saovanee Boonamphai	100 metre freestyle	59.36	40	Did not advance			
Saovanee Boonamphai	50 metre backstroke	29.22	28	Did not advance			
Kamonchanok Kwanmuang	200 metre freestyle	2:03.22	33	Did not advance			
Kamonchanok Kwanmuang	100 metre butterfly	1:01.45	28	Did not advance			
Kamonchanok Kwanmuang	200 metre butterfly	2:11.97	13 Q	2:12.14	12	Did not advance	
Kamonchanok Kwanmuang	200 metre individual medley	2:17.48	19	Did not advance			
Kamonchanok Kwanmuang	400 metre individual medley	4:49.11	17	—		Did not advance	
Jenjira Srisaard	50 metre freestyle	25.41	19	Did not advance			
Jenjira Srisaard	50 metre breaststroke	31.35	19	Did not advance			
Jenjira Srisaard	50 metre butterfly	26.84	22	Did not advance			

Mixed

Athlete	Event	Heat		Semifinal		Final	
Athlete	Event	Time	Rank	Time	Rank	Time	Rank
Dulyawat Kaewsriyong; Tonnam Kanteemool; Kamonchanok Kwanmuang; Jenjira Srisaard	4 × 100 m freestyle relay	3:39.85	10	—		Did not advance	
Ratthawit Thammananthachote; Saovanee Boonamphai; Navaphat Wongcharoen; Jenjira Srisaard	4 × 100 m medley relay	4:05.94	23	—		Did not advance	
