= Swimming at the 2017 World Aquatics Championships – Women's 800 metre freestyle =

Women's 800 metre freestyle at the 2017 World Aquatics Championships
- Venue: Danube Arena
- Location: Budapest, Hungary
- Dates: 28 July (heats); 29 July (final)
- Competitors: 40 from 34 nations
- Winning time: 8:12.68

Medalists
gold medal	Katie Ledecky	United States
silver medal	Li Bingjie	China
bronze medal	Leah Smith	United States

The Women's 800 metre freestyle competition at the 2017 World Championships was held on 28 and 29 July 2017.

== Records ==
Prior to the competition, the existing world and championship records were as follows.

World record	Katie Ledecky (USA)	8:04.79	Rio de Janeiro, Brazil	12 August 2016
Competition record	Katie Ledecky (USA)	8:07.39	Kazan, Russia	8 August 2015

== Results ==
=== Heats ===
The heats were held on 28 July at 11:06.

Rank	Heat	Lane	Name	Nationality	Time	Notes
1	4	4	Katie Ledecky	United States	8:20.24	Q
2	3	5	Leah Smith	United States	8:21.19	Q
3	4	3	Li Bingjie	China	8:22.92	Q
4	4	5	Mireia Belmonte	Spain	8:24.98	Q
5	3	6	Simona Quadarella	Italy	8:27.70	Q
6	3	4	Boglárka Kapás	Hungary	8:28.93	Q
7	4	6	Zhang Yuhan	China	8:29.52	Q
8	3	1	Holly Hibbott	Great Britain	8:30.66	Q
9	3	2	Ajna Késely	Hungary	8:32.01	
10	2	4	Julia Hassler	Liechtenstein	8:34.13	NR
11	4	8	Celine Rieder	Germany	8:34.16	
12	3	8	Kristel Köbrich	Chile	8:34.51	
13	3	9	Diana Duraes	Portugal	8:35.10	
14	3	3	Ariarne Titmus	Australia	8:37.10	
15	4	2	Tjaša Oder	Slovenia	8:38.84	
16	4	1	Mackenzie Padington	Canada	8:40.68	
17	2	3	Choi Jung-min	South Korea	8:40.87	
18	4	7	Jimena Pérez	Spain	8:41.41	
19	4	9	Gaja Natlačen	Slovenia	8:41.49	
20	4	0	Olivia Anderson	Canada	8:43.93	
21	3	0	Tamila Holub	Portugal	8:44.85	
22	3	7	Emma Robinson	New Zealand	8:44.87	
23	2	5	Paulina Piechota	Poland	8:49.76	
24	2	7	Martina Elhenická	Czech Republic	8:52.39	
25	2	1	Monique Olivier	Luxembourg	8:54.27	
26	2	8	Hania Moro	Egypt	8:54.30	
27	1	4	María Bramont-Arias	Peru	8:56.12	
28	2	2	Helena Moreno	Costa Rica	8:56.43	
29	2	9	Kate Beavon	South Africa	8:58.31	
30	2	0	Raina Ramdhani	Indonesia	9:02.49	
31	1	5	Ho Nam Wai	Hong Kong	9:03.38	
32	1	3	Souad Cherouati	Algeria	9:05.67	
33	1	7	Talita Te Flan	Ivory Coast	9:07.56	
34	2	6	Ayumi Macías	Mexico	9:08.78	
35	1	6	Daniella van den Berg	Aruba	9:17.77	
36	1	1	Gabriella Doueihy	Lebanon	9:19.43	
37	1	2	Sudthirak Watcharabusaracum	Thailand	9:32.44	
38	1	8	Hannah Gill	Barbados	9:39.78	

=== Final ===
The final was held on 29 July at 18:55.

Rank	Lane	Name	Nationality	Time	Notes
1st place, gold medalist(s)	4	Katie Ledecky	United States	8:12.68	
2nd place, silver medalist(s)	3	Li Bingjie	China	8:15.46	AS
3rd place, bronze medalist(s)	5	Leah Smith	United States	8:17.22	
4	6	Mireia Belmonte	Spain	8:23.30	
5	7	Boglárka Kapás	Hungary	8:24.41	
6	1	Zhang Yuhan	China	8:26.06	
7	2	Simona Quadarella	Italy	8:26.50	
8	8	Holly Hibbott	Great Britain	8:38.63	
