= List of Ivorian records in swimming =

The Ivorian records in swimming are the fastest ever performances of swimmers from Ivory Coast, which are recognised and ratified by the Federation Ivoirienne de Natation et de Sauvetage.

All records were set in finals unless noted otherwise.

== Long Course (50 m) ==
=== Men ===
Event	Time		Name	Club	Date	Meet	Location	Ref
50m freestyle	23.91	h	Thibaut Danho	Côte d'Ivoire	7 August 2015	World Championships	Kazan, Russia	
100m freestyle	52.78	h	Thibaut Danho	Côte d'Ivoire	9 August 2016	Olympic Games	Rio de Janeiro, Brazil	
200 m freestyle								
400 m freestyle								
800 m freestyle								
1500 m freestyle								
50m backstroke	33.92	h	Tano Atta	Ivory Coast	8 August 2015	World Championships	Kazan, Russia	
100 m backstroke								
200 m backstroke								
50 m breaststroke								
100 m breaststroke								
200 m breaststroke								
50m butterfly	25.33	h	Thibaut Danho	Côte d'Ivoire	2 August 2015	World Championships	Kazan, Russia	
100m butterfly	58.02	h	Thibaut Amani Danho	Côte d'Ivoire	7 September 2015	African Games	Brazzaville, Republic of the Congo	
200 m butterfly								
200 m individual medley								
400 m individual medley								
4×100 m freestyle relay								
4×200 m freestyle relay								
4×100 m medley relay								

Legend: # – Record awaiting ratification by Federation Ivoirienne de Natation et de Sauvetage; WR – World record; AF – African record;
Records not set in finals: h – heat; sf – semifinal; r – relay 1st leg; rh – relay heat 1st leg; b – B final; † – en route to final mark; tt – time trial

=== Women ===
Event	Time		Name	Club	Date	Meet	Location	Ref
50 m freestyle								
100 m freestyle	1:02.62	sf	Talita Te Flan	Ivory Coast	7 September 2015	African Games	Brazzaville, Republic of the Congo	
200 m freestyle	2:09.77		Talita Te Flan	Ivory Coast	27 May 2016	Championnats d’Afrique de l’Ouest	Senegal	
400 m freestyle	4:26.72	h	Talita Te Flan	Ivory Coast	23 July 2017	World Championships	Budapest, Hungary	
800 m freestyle	9:07.21	h	Talita Te Flan	Ivory Coast	11 August 2016	Olympic Games	Rio de Janeiro, Brazil	
1500 m freestyle	17:25.19		Talita Te Flan	Ivory Coast	11 September 2015	African Games	Brazzaville, Republic of the Congo	
50 m backstroke								
100 m backstroke								
200 m backstroke	2:43.49		Talita Te Flan	Ivory Coast	29 May 2016	Championnats d’Afrique de l’Ouest	Senegal	
50 m breaststroke								
100 m breaststroke								
200 m breaststroke								
50 m butterfly	35.43	h	Lucie Kouadio-Patinier	Ivory Coast	26 July 2019	World Championships	Gwangju, South Korea	
100 m butterfly	1:26.46	h	Lucie Kouadio-Patinier	Ivory Coast	21 July 2019	World Championships	Gwangju, South Korea	
200 m butterfly								
200 m individual medley	2:37.98		Talita Te Flan	Ivory Coast	29 May 2016	Championnats d’Afrique de l’Ouest	Senegal	
400 m individual medley								
4×100 m freestyle relay								
4×200 m freestyle relay								
4×100 m medley relay								

Legend: # – Record awaiting ratification by Federation Ivoirienne de Natation et de Sauvetage; WR – World record; AF – African record;
Records not set in finals: h – heat; sf – semifinal; r – relay 1st leg; rh – relay heat 1st leg; b – B final; † – en route to final mark; tt – time trial

== Short Course (25 m) ==
=== Men ===
Event	Time		Name	Club	Date	Meet	Location	Ref
50m freestyle	25.90	h	Tano Pierre Claver Atta	Côte d'Ivoire	13 December 2012	World Championships	Istanbul, Turkey	
100m freestyle	56.85	h	Franck Olivier Brou Kouassi	Côte d'Ivoire	18 December 2010	World Championships	Dubai, United Arab Emirates	
200m freestyle	2:16.64	h	Franck Olivier Brou Kouassi	Côte d'Ivoire	15 December 2010	World Championships	Dubai, United Arab Emirates	
400 m freestyle								
800 m freestyle								
1500 m freestyle								
50m backstroke	31.28	h	Alassane Sylla	Côte d'Ivoire	14 December 2012	World Championships	Istanbul, Turkey	
100m backstroke	1:13.43	h	Tano Pierre Claver Atta	Côte d'Ivoire	15 December 2010	World Championships	Dubai, United Arab Emirates	
200 m backstroke								
50m breaststroke	33.10	h	Franck Olivier Brou Kouassi	Côte d'Ivoire	18 December 2010	World Championships	Dubai, United Arab Emirates	
100m breaststroke	1:17.35	h	Côte d'Ivoire	9 April 2008	World Championships	Manchester, United Kingdom		
200 m breaststroke								
50m butterfly	26.84	h	Sylla Alassane	Côte d'Ivoire	5 December 2014	World Championships	Doha, Qatar	
100m butterfly	1:04.81	h	Sylla Alassane	Côte d'Ivoire	4 December 2014	World Championships	Doha, Qatar	
200 m butterfly								
100m individual medley	1:07.16	h	Franck Olivier Brou Kouassi	Côte d'Ivoire	18 December 2010	World Championships	Dubai, United Arab Emirates	
200m individual medley	2:33.93	h	Franck Olivier Brou Kouassi	Côte d'Ivoire	11 April 2008	World Championships	Manchester, United Kingdom	
400 m individual medley								
4×50 m freestyle relay								
4×100 m freestyle relay								
4×200 m freestyle relay								
4×50 m medley relay								
4×100 m medley relay								

Legend: # – Record awaiting ratification by Federation Ivoirienne de Natation et de Sauvetage; WR – World record; AF – African record;
Records not set in finals: h – heat; sf – semifinal; r – relay 1st leg; rh – relay heat 1st leg; b – B final; † – en route to final mark; tt – time trial

=== Women ===
Event	Time		Name	Club	Date	Meet	Location	Ref
50m freestyle	28.40	h	Éliane Droubry	-	12 April 2008	World Championships	Manchester, United Kingdom	
100 m freestyle								
200 m freestyle								
400 m freestyle								
800 m freestyle								
1500 m freestyle								
50 m backstroke								
100 m backstroke								
200 m backstroke								
50 m breaststroke								
100m breaststroke	1:17.23	h	Éliane Droubry	-	11 April 2008	World Championships	Manchester, United Kingdom	
200 m breaststroke								
50 m butterfly								
100 m butterfly								
200 m butterfly								
100 m individual medley								
200m individual medley	2:45.24	h	Éliane Droubry	-	12 April 2008	World Championships	Manchester, United Kingdom	
400 m individual medley								
4×50 m freestyle relay								
4×100 m freestyle relay								
4×200 m freestyle relay								
4×50 m medley relay								
4×100 m medley relay								

Legend: # – Record awaiting ratification by Federation Ivoirienne de Natation et de Sauvetage; WR – World record; AF – African record;
Records not set in finals: h – heat; sf – semifinal; r – relay 1st leg; rh – relay heat 1st leg; b – B final; † – en route to final mark; tt – time trial
