= Ivory Coast at the 2017 World Aquatics Championships =

- Flag of Ivory Coast
- FINA code: CIV
- National federation: Federation Ivorienne de Natation et de Sauvetagé

in Budapest, Hungary
- Competitors: 4 in 1 sport
- Medals: Gold 0 Silver 0 Bronze 0 Total 0

World Aquatics Championships appearances
- 2001; 2003; 2005; 2007; 2009; 2011; 2013; 2015; 2017; 2019; 2022; 2023; 2024

Ivory Coast competed at the 2017 World Aquatics Championships in Budapest, Hungary from 14 July to 30 July.

== Swimming ==
Ivory Coast has received a Universality invitation from FINA to send a maximum of four swimmers (two men and two women) to the World Championships.

Athlete	Event	Heat		Semifinal		Final	
Athlete	Event	Time	Rank	Time	Rank	Time	Rank
Tano Atta	Men's 50 m backstroke	DNS		Did not advance			
Thibaut Danho	Men's 50 m freestyle	24.24	85	Did not advance			
Thibaut Danho	Men's 50 m butterfly	25.74	56	Did not advance			
Kokoe Ahyee	Women's 50 m breaststroke	DNS		Did not advance			
Talita Te Flan	Women's 400 m freestyle	4:26.72	31	—		Did not advance	
Talita Te Flan	Women's 800 m freestyle	9:07.56	33	—		Did not advance	
