= Barbados at the 2011 World Aquatics Championships =

Sporting event delegation

- Flag of Barbados
- World Aquatics code: BAR
- National federation: Barbados Amateur Swimming Association
- Website: www.swimbarbados.com

in Shanghai, China
- Competitors: 1 in 1 sports
- Medals: Gold 0 Silver 0 Bronze 0 Total 0

World Aquatics Championships appearances
- 1973; 1975; 1978; 1982; 1986; 1991; 1994; 1998; 2001; 2003; 2005; 2007; 2009; 2011; 2013; 2015; 2017; 2019; 2022; 2023; 2024; 2025

Barbados competed at the 2011 World Aquatics Championships in Shanghai, China between July 16 and 31, 2011.

== Swimming ==
Barbados qualified 1 swimmer.

Men

Athlete	Event	Heats		Semifinals		Final	
Athlete	Event	Time	Rank	Time	Rank	Time	Rank
Bradley Ally	Men's 100m Backstroke	55.88	36	did not advance			
Bradley Ally	Men's 100m Butterfly	54.42	40	did not advance			
Bradley Ally	Men's 200m IM	2:00.03	17	did not advance			
