= Ivory Coast at the 2015 World Aquatics Championships =

- Flag of Ivory Coast
- FINA code: CIV
- National federation: Federation Ivorienne de Natation et de Sauvetagé

in Kazan, Russia
- Competitors: 4 in 1 sport
- Medals: Gold 0 Silver 0 Bronze 0 Total 0

World Aquatics Championships appearances
- 2001; 2003; 2005; 2007; 2009; 2011; 2013; 2015; 2017; 2019; 2022; 2023; 2024

Ivory Coast competed at the 2015 World Aquatics Championships in Kazan, Russia from 24 July to 9 August 2015.

== Swimming ==
Ivorian swimmers have achieved qualifying standards in the following events (up to a maximum of 2 swimmers in each event at the A-standard entry time, and 1 at the B-standard):

Men

Athlete	Event	Heat		Semifinal		Final	
Athlete	Event	Time	Rank	Time	Rank	Time	Rank
Tano Pierre Atta	50 m backstroke	33.92	66	Did not advance			
Tano Pierre Atta	50 m breaststroke	38.65	73	Did not advance			
Thibaut Danho	50 m freestyle	23.91	56	Did not advance			
Thibaut Danho	50 m butterfly	25.33	47	Did not advance			

Women

Athlete	Event	Heat		Semifinal		Final	
Athlete	Event	Time	Rank	Time	Rank	Time	Rank
Kokoe Ahyee	50 m breaststroke	DNS		Did not advance			
Talita Te Flan	400 m freestyle	4:32.72	44	—		Did not advance	
Talita Te Flan	800 m freestyle	9:16.89	39	—		Did not advance	
