= Barbados at the 2024 World Aquatics Championships =

- Flag of Barbados
- World Aquatics code: BAR
- National federation: Barbados Amateur Swimming Association
- Website: www.swimbarbados.com

in Doha, Qatar
- Competitors: 2 in 1 sport
- Medals: Gold 0 Silver 0 Bronze 0 Total 0

World Aquatics Championships appearances
- 1973; 1975; 1978; 1982; 1986; 1991; 1994; 1998; 2001; 2003; 2005; 2007; 2009; 2011; 2013; 2015; 2017; 2019; 2022; 2023; 2024; 2025

Barbados competed at the 2024 World Aquatics Championships in Doha, Qatar from 2 to 18 February.

== Swimming ==
Barbadian swimmers competed in the following events.

Men

Athlete	Event	Heat		Semifinal		Final	
Athlete	Event	Time	Rank	Time	Rank	Time	Rank
Alex Sobers	100 m freestyle	52.09	61	Did not advance			
Alex Sobers	200 m freestyle	1:53.93	47	Did not advance			
Luis Sebastian Weekes	100 m breaststroke	1:06.27	60	Did not advance			
Luis Sebastian Weekes	200 m breaststroke	2:32.02	32	Did not advance			
