= Thailand at the 2015 World Aquatics Championships =

- Flag of Thailand
- FINA code: THA
- National federation: Thailand Swimming Association
- Website: www.tasa.in.th

in Kazan, Russia
- Competitors: 8 in 1 sport
- Medals: Gold 0 Silver 0 Bronze 0 Total 0

World Aquatics Championships appearances
- 1973; 1975; 1978; 1982; 1986; 1991; 1994; 1998; 2001; 2003; 2005; 2007; 2009; 2011; 2013; 2015; 2017; 2019; 2022; 2023; 2024

Thailand competed at the 2015 World Aquatics Championships in Kazan, Russia from 24 July to 9 August 2015.

== Swimming ==
Thai swimmers have achieved qualifying standards in the following events (up to a maximum of 2 swimmers in each event at the A-standard entry time, and 1 at the B-standard):

Men

Athlete	Event	Heat		Semifinal		Final	
Athlete	Event	Time	Rank	Time	Rank	Time	Rank
Kasipat Chograthin	50 m backstroke	26.20	38	did not advance			
Tanakrit Kittiya	400 m freestyle	4:01.59	56	—		did not advance	
Radomyos Matjiur	200 m breaststroke	2:21.30	48	did not advance			

Women

Athlete	Event	Heat		Semifinal		Final	
Athlete	Event	Time	Rank	Time	Rank	Time	Rank
Natthanan Junkrajang	100 m freestyle	56.95	46	did not advance			
Natthanan Junkrajang	200 m freestyle	2:02.83	42	did not advance			
Sutasinee Pankaew	200 m butterfly	2:19.54	34	did not advance			
Phiangkhwan Pawapotako	200 m breaststroke	2:34.77	38	did not advance			
Phiangkhwan Pawapotako	200 m individual medley	2:17.69	32	did not advance			
Phiangkhwan Pawapotako	400 m individual medley	4:53.15	30	—		did not advance	
Benjaporn Sriphanomthorn	400 m freestyle	4:36.55	46	—		did not advance	
Jenjira Srisa-Ard	50 m freestyle	26.11	43	did not advance			

Mixed

Athlete	Event	Heat		Final	
Athlete	Event	Time	Rank	Time	Rank
Kasipat Chograthin; Radomyos Matjiur; Sutasinee Pankaew; Jenjira Srisa-Ard	4×100 m medley relay	4:07.19	15	did not advance	
