= Barbados at the 2015 World Aquatics Championships =

- Flag of Barbados
- FINA code: BAR
- National federation: Barbados Amateur Swimming Association
- Website: www.swimbarbados.com

in Kazan, Russia
- Competitors: 4 in 1 sport
- Medals: Gold 0 Silver 0 Bronze 0 Total 0

World Aquatics Championships appearances
- 1973; 1975; 1978; 1982; 1986; 1991; 1994; 1998; 2001; 2003; 2005; 2007; 2009; 2011; 2013; 2015; 2017; 2019; 2022; 2023; 2024

Barbados competed at the 2015 World Aquatics Championships in Kazan, Russia from 24 July to 9 August 2015.

== Swimming ==
Barbadian swimmers have achieved qualifying standards in the following events (up to a maximum of 2 swimmers in each event at the A-standard entry time, and 1 at the B-standard):

Men

| Athlete | Event | Heat | | Semifinal | | Final | |
| Athlete | Event | Time | Rank | Time | Rank | Time | Rank |
|---|---|---|---|---|---|---|---|
| Christian Selby | 200 m freestyle | 1:57.74 | 68 | did not advance | | | |
| Alex Sobers | 50 m freestyle | 24.87 | 73 | did not advance | | | |
| Alex Sobers | 400 m freestyle | 4:05.07 | 61 | — | | did not advance | |

Women

| Athlete | Event | Heat | | Semifinal | | Final | |
| Athlete | Event | Time | Rank | Time | Rank | Time | Rank |
|---|---|---|---|---|---|---|---|
| Lani Cabrera | 200 m freestyle | 2:07.75 | 52 | did not advance | | | |
| Lani Cabrera | 400 m freestyle | 4:28.31 | 41 | — | | did not advance | |
| Hannah Gill | 50 m freestyle | 28.75 | 83 | did not advance | | | |
| Hannah Gill | 800 m freestyle | 9:16.23 | 38 | — | | did not advance | |
