= Thailand at the 2019 World Aquatics Championships =

- Flag of Thailand
- FINA code: THA
- National federation: Thailand Swimming Association
- Website: swimming.or.th (in Thai)

in Gwangju, South Korea
- Medals: Gold 0 Silver 0 Bronze 0 Total 0

World Aquatics Championships appearances
- 1973; 1975; 1978; 1982; 1986; 1991; 1994; 1998; 2001; 2003; 2005; 2007; 2009; 2011; 2013; 2015; 2017; 2019; 2022; 2023; 2024

Thailand competed at the 2019 World Aquatics Championships in Gwangju, South Korea from 12 to 28 July.

== Artistic swimming ==
Thailand entered 12 artistic swimmers.

Women

Athlete	Event	Preliminaries		Final	
Athlete	Event	Points	Rank	Points	Rank
Pongpimporn Pongsuwan; Arpapat Saengrusamee	Duet technical routine	62.1222	44	did not advance	
Pongpimporn Pongsuwan; Supitchaya Songpan	Duet free routine	65.8667	43	did not advance	
Patrawee Chayawararak; Athicha Khuncheay; Pongpimporn Pongsuwan; Arpapat Saengrusamee; Patcharaporn Somyos; Supitchaya Songpan; Voranan Toomchay; Kuntida Yookittichai; Chantaras Jarupraditlert (R); Thanyakorn Chaowalitthawil (R)	Team free routine	65.5000	27	did not advance	
Patrawee Chayawararak; Chantaras Jarupraditlert; Athicha Khuncheay; Pongpimporn Pongsuwan; Armenah Prang; Arpapat Saengrusamee; Patcharaporn Somyos; Supitchaya Songpan; Voranan Toomchay; Kuntida Yookittichai; Thanyakorn Chaowalitthawil (R); Ploynamphet Netthip (R)	Highlight routine	—		71.1333	8
Patrawee Chayawararak; Chantaras Jarupraditlert; Athicha Khuncheay; Pongpimporn Pongsuwan; Armenah Prang; Arpapat Saengrusamee; Patcharaporn Somyos; Supitchaya Songpan; Voranan Toomchay; Kuntida Yookittichai; Thanyakorn Chaowalitthawil (R); Ploynamphet Netthip (R)	Free routine combination	66.1333	15	did not advance	

Legend: (R) = Reserve Athlete

== Diving ==
Thailand entered six divers.

Men

Athlete	Event	Preliminaries		Semifinals		Final	
Athlete	Event	Points	Rank	Points	Rank	Points	Rank
Rungsiman Yanmongkon	1 m springboard	141.25	44	—		did not advance	
Rungsiman Yanmongkon	3 m springboard	218.50	56	did not advance			
Conrad Lewandowski	10 m platform	283.55	44	did not advance			
Thitipoom Marksin	10 m platform	269.00	46	did not advance			
Conrad Lewandowski; Thitipoom Marksin	10 m synchronized platform	277.86	16	—		did not advance	

Women

Athlete	Event	Preliminaries		Final	
Athlete	Event	Points	Rank	Points	Rank
Kwanchanok Khunboonjan	1 m springboard	135.90	42	did not advance	
Surincha Booranapol; Ramanya Yanmongkon	3 m synchronized springboard	174.06	23	did not advance	

Mixed

Athlete	Event	Final	
Athlete	Event	Points	Rank
Thitipoom Marksin; Ramanya Yanmongkon	Team	238.70	16

== Open water swimming ==
Thailand qualified two male and two female open water swimmers.

Men

Athlete	Event	Time	Rank
Tanakrit Kittiya	Men's 10 km	2:00:37.1	67
Siwat Matangkapong	Men's 10 km	2:09:32.8	71

Women

Athlete	Event	Time	Rank
Pimpun Choopong	Women's 10 km	2:08:16.6	54
Katawan Teeka	Women's 10 km	2:17:27.0	58

== Swimming ==
Thailand entered six swimmers.

Men

Athlete	Event	Heat		Semifinal		Final	
Athlete	Event	Time	Rank	Time	Rank	Time	Rank
Kasipat Chograthin	50 m backstroke	26.95	53	did not advance			
Kasipat Chograthin	100 m backstroke	59.10	53	did not advance			
Andrew Digby	100 m freestyle	51.47	65	did not advance			
Andrew Digby	200 m freestyle	1:53.01	52	did not advance			
Navaphat Wongcharoen	100 m butterfly	54.38	43	did not advance			
Navaphat Wongcharoen	200 m butterfly	2:01.40	33	did not advance			

Women

Athlete	Event	Heat		Semifinal		Final	
Athlete	Event	Time	Rank	Time	Rank	Time	Rank
Ammiga Himathongkom	800 m freestyle	8:57.83	33	—		did not advance	
Natthanan Junkrajang	200 m freestyle	2:01.86	27	did not advance			
Natthanan Junkrajang	400 m freestyle	4:19.00	30	—		did not advance	
Jenjira Srisaard	50 m breaststroke	32.33	33	did not advance			
Jenjira Srisaard	50 m butterfly	26.93	28	did not advance			
