= Barbados at the 2017 World Aquatics Championships =

- Flag of Barbados
- FINA code: BAR
- National federation: Barbados Amateur Swimming Association
- Website: www.swimbarbados.com

in Budapest, Hungary
- Competitors: 4 in 1 sport
- Medals: Gold 0 Silver 0 Bronze 0 Total 0

World Aquatics Championships appearances
- 1973; 1975; 1978; 1982; 1986; 1991; 1994; 1998; 2001; 2003; 2005; 2007; 2009; 2011; 2013; 2015; 2017; 2019; 2022; 2023; 2024

Barbados competed at the 2017 World Aquatics Championships in Budapest, Hungary from 14 July to 30 July.

== Swimming ==
Barbados has received a Universality invitation from FINA to send a maximum of four swimmers (two men and two women) to the World Championships.

Athlete	Event	Heat		Semifinal		Final	
Athlete	Event	Time	Rank	Time	Rank	Time	Rank
Christopher Courtis	Men's 50 m backstroke						
Christopher Courtis	Men's 100 m backstroke	57.23	35	did not advance			
Alex Sobers	Men's 200 m freestyle	1:52.50	56	did not advance			
Alex Sobers	Men's 400 m freestyle	4:00.50	44	—		did not advance	
Lani Cabrera	Women's 100 m freestyle	1:00.75	59	did not advance			
Lani Cabrera	Women's 200 m freestyle	2:11.77	45	did not advance			
Hannah Gill	Women's 400 m freestyle	4:42.55	34	—		did not advance	
Hannah Gill	Women's 800 m freestyle	9:39.78	38	—		did not advance	
