= Thailand at the 2017 World Aquatics Championships =

- Flag of Thailand
- FINA code: THA
- National federation: Thailand Swimming Association
- Website: www.tasa.in.th

in Budapest, Hungary
- Competitors: 4 in 1 sport
- Medals: Gold 0 Silver 0 Bronze 0 Total 0

World Aquatics Championships appearances
- 1973; 1975; 1978; 1982; 1986; 1991; 1994; 1998; 2001; 2003; 2005; 2007; 2009; 2011; 2013; 2015; 2017; 2019; 2022; 2023; 2024

Thailand competed at the 2017 World Aquatics Championships in Budapest, Hungary from 14 July to 30 July.

== Swimming ==
Thailand has received a Universality invitation from FINA to send a maximum of four swimmers (two men and two women) to the World Championships.

Athlete	Event	Heat		Semifinal		Final	
Athlete	Event	Time	Rank	Time	Rank	Time	Rank
Narang Pornsiriporn	Men's 50 m backstroke	27.84	45	did not advance			
Narang Pornsiriporn	Men's 50 m butterfly	25.99	58	did not advance			
Jeerakit Soammanus	Men's 100 m butterfly	56.88	61	did not advance			
Jeerakit Soammanus	Men's 200 m butterfly	2:07.30	43	did not advance			
Nawapas Pisanuwong	Women's 100 m breaststroke	1:16.91	43	did not advance			
Nawapas Pisanuwong	Women's 200 m breaststroke	2:49.09	34	did not advance			
Sudthirak Watcharabusaracum	Women's 400 m freestyle	4:30.96	32	—		did not advance	
Sudthirak Watcharabusaracum	Women's 800 m freestyle	9:32.44	37	—		did not advance	
