= Barbados at the 2013 World Aquatics Championships =

- Flag of Barbados
- FINA code: BAR
- National federation: Barbados Amateur Swimming Association
- Website: www.swimbarbados.com

in Barcelona, Spain
- Competitors: 2 in 1 sports
- Medals: Gold 0 Silver 0 Bronze 0 Total 0

World Aquatics Championships appearances
- 1973; 1975; 1978; 1982; 1986; 1991; 1994; 1998; 2001; 2003; 2005; 2007; 2009; 2011; 2013; 2015; 2017; 2019; 2022; 2023; 2024

Barbados is competing at the 2013 World Aquatics Championships in Barcelona, Spain between 19 July and 4 August 2013.

== Swimming ==
Barbadian swimmers achieved qualifying standards in the following events (up to a maximum of 2 swimmers in each event at the A-standard entry time, and 1 at the B-standard):

Women

Athlete	Event	Heat		Semifinal		Final	
Athlete	Event	Time	Rank	Time	Rank	Time	Rank
Lani Cabrera	800 m freestyle	9:08.84	32	—		did not advance	
Lani Cabrera	1500 m freestyle	17:38.41	22	—		did not advance	
Alexis Clarke	200 m freestyle	2:14.44	41	did not advance			
Alexis Clarke	400 m freestyle	4:42.82	34	—		did not advance	
