= Swimming at the 2015 SEA Games – Men's 4 × 100 metre medley relay =

Swimming – Men's 4 x 100 metre medley relay at the 2015 SEA Games
- Venue: OCBC Aquatic Centre
- Date: 11 June 2015
- Competitors: 24 from 6 nations

Medalists
gold medal	Singapore (SIN)
silver medal	Indonesia (INA)
bronze medal	Thailand (THA)

The men's 4 x 100 metre medley relay competition of the swimming events at the 2015 SEA Games was held on 11 June at the OCBC Aquatic Centre in Singapore.

== Schedule ==
All times are Singapore Standard Time (UTC+08:00)

Date	Time	Event
Thursday, 11 June 2015	20:38	Final

== Records ==
Prior to this competition, the existing Asian and Games records were as follows:

Asian Record	Japan (JPN)	3:30.74	Rome, Italy	2 August 2009
Games Record	Indonesia (INA)	3:41.35	Palembang, Indonesia	17 November 2011

The following records were established during the competition:

Date	Event	Team	Time	Record
11 June	Final	Singapore (SIN)	3:38.25	GR

== Results ==
KEY:	GR	Games record	NR	National record	PB	Personal best	SB	Seasonal best	WD	Withdrew	DNF	Did not finish	DSQ	Disqualified

=== Final ===
Source: Final Results

The final was held on 11 June.

Rank	Lane	Team	Time	Notes
1st place, gold medalist(s)	5	Singapore (SIN): Quah Zheng Wen (54.81); Khoo Chien Yin Lionel (1:02.33); Joseph Isaac Schooling (51.50); Clement Lim Yong'En (49.61)	3:38.25	GR
2nd place, silver medalist(s)	4	Indonesia (INA): I Gede Siman Sudartawa (55.78); Indra Gunawan (1:02.18); Glenn Victor Sutanto (53.33); Triady Fauzi Sidiq (50.81)	3:42.10	
3rd place, bronze medalist(s)	3	Thailand (THA): Kasipat Chograthin (57.77); Radomyos Matjiur (1:01.95); Navaphat Wongcharoen (55.38); Napat Wesshasartar (50.57)	3:45.67	NR
4	6	Malaysia (MAS): Tern Jian Han (57.21); Wong Fu Kang (1:01.77); Daniel William Henry Bego (55.77); Welson Sim Wee Sheng (51.54)	3:46.29	
5	2	Philippines (PHI): Jose Joaquin Gonzalez (59.02); Joshua Hall (1:02.65); Jessie Khing Lacuna (54.42); Axel Toni Steven Ngui (52.00)	3:48.09	
6	7	Cambodia (CAM): Thouen Thol (1:11.43); Hem Thonponloeu (1:12.48); Lim Odam (1:04.93); Pou Sovijja (53.25)	4:22.09	
