= Barbados at the 2019 World Aquatics Championships =

- Flag of Barbados
- FINA code: BAR
- National federation: Barbados Amateur Swimming Association
- Website: www.swimbarbados.com

in Gwangju, South Korea
- Competitors: 4 in 1 sport
- Medals: Gold 0 Silver 0 Bronze 0 Total 0

World Aquatics Championships appearances
- 1973; 1975; 1978; 1982; 1986; 1991; 1994; 1998; 2001; 2003; 2005; 2007; 2009; 2011; 2013; 2015; 2017; 2019; 2022; 2023; 2024

Barbados competed at the 2019 World Aquatics Championships in Gwangju, South Korea from 12 to 28 July.

== Swimming ==
Barbados entered four swimmers.

Men

| Athlete | Event | Heat | | Semifinal | | Final | |
| Athlete | Event | Time | Rank | Time | Rank | Time | Rank |
|---|---|---|---|---|---|---|---|
| Jack Kirby | 50 m backstroke | 26.52 | 48 | did not advance | | | |
| Jack Kirby | 100 m backstroke | 56.25 | 42 | did not advance | | | |
| Alex Sobers | 200 m freestyle | 1:51.89 | 46 | did not advance | | | |
| Alex Sobers | 400 m freestyle | 3:58.97 | 36 | — | | did not advance | |

Women

| Athlete | Event | Heat | | Semifinal | | Final | |
| Athlete | Event | Time | Rank | Time | Rank | Time | Rank |
|---|---|---|---|---|---|---|---|
| Danielle Titus | 100 m backstroke | 1:03.66 | 43 | did not advance | | | |
| Danielle Titus | 200 m backstroke | 2:25.13 | 38 | did not advance | | | |
| Danielle Treasure | 200 m freestyle | 2:11.51 | 46 | did not advance | | | |
| Danielle Treasure | 400 m freestyle | 4:37.22 | 40 | — | | did not advance | |
