= Ivory Coast at the 2023 World Aquatics Championships =

- Flag of Ivory Coast
- FINA code: CIV
- National federation: Ivorian Federation of Swimming and Rescue

in Fukuoka, Japan
- Competitors: 0
- Medals: Gold 0 Silver 0 Bronze 0 Total 0

World Aquatics Championships appearances
- 2001; 2003; 2005; 2007; 2009; 2011; 2013; 2015; 2017; 2019; 2022; 2023; 2024

Ivory Coast is set to compete at the 2023 World Aquatics Championships in Fukuoka, Japan from 14 to 30 July.

== Swimming ==
Ivory Coast entered 1 swimmer.

Women

| Athlete | Event | Heat | | Semifinal | | Final | |
| Athlete | Event | Time | Rank | Time | Rank | Time | Rank |
|---|---|---|---|---|---|---|---|
| Talita Te Flan | 400 metre freestyle | | | — | | | |
| Talita Te Flan | 800 metre freestyle | | | — | | | |
