= Barbados at the 2023 World Aquatics Championships =

- Flag of Barbados
- FINA code: BAR
- National federation: Barbados Amateur Swimming Association
- Website: www.swimbarbados.com

in Fukuoka, Japan
- Competitors: 4 in 1 sport
- Medals: Gold 0 Silver 0 Bronze 0 Total 0

World Aquatics Championships appearances
- 1973; 1975; 1978; 1982; 1986; 1991; 1994; 1998; 2001; 2003; 2005; 2007; 2009; 2011; 2013; 2015; 2017; 2019; 2022; 2023; 2024

Barbados competed at the 2023 World Aquatics Championships in Fukuoka, Japan from 14 to 30 July.

== Swimming ==
Barbadian swimmers have achieved qualifying standards in the following events.

Men

Athlete	Event	Heat		Semifinal		Final	
Athlete	Event	Time	Rank	Time	Rank	Time	Rank
Jack Kirby	50 m backstroke	26.17	39	Did not advance			
Jack Kirby	100 m backstroke	56.08	38	Did not advance			
Luis Sebastian Weekes	100 m breaststroke	1:05.15	57	Did not advance			
Luis Sebastian Weekes	200 m breaststroke	2:22.94	39	Did not advance			

Women

Athlete	Event	Heat		Semifinal		Final	
Athlete	Event	Time	Rank	Time	Rank	Time	Rank
Danielle Treasure	200 m freestyle	2:08.88	50	Did not advance			
Danielle Treasure	400 m freestyle	4:32.39	37	—		Did not advance	
Danielle Titus	100 m backstroke	1:04.40	43	Did not advance			
Danielle Titus	200 m backstroke	2:21.36	35	Did not advance			
