= Ivory Coast at the 2019 World Aquatics Championships =

- Flag of Ivory Coast
- FINA code: CIV
- National federation: Fédération Ivorienne de Natation et Sauvetage

in Gwangju, South Korea
- Competitors: 3 in 1 sport
- Medals: Gold 0 Silver 0 Bronze 0 Total 0

World Aquatics Championships appearances
- 2001; 2003; 2005; 2007; 2009; 2011; 2013; 2015; 2017; 2019; 2022; 2023; 2024

Ivory Coast competed at the 2019 World Aquatics Championships in Gwangju, South Korea from 12 to 28 July.

== Swimming ==
Ivory Coast has entered three swimmers.

Men

Athlete	Event	Heat		Semifinal		Final	
Athlete	Event	Time	Rank	Time	Rank	Time	Rank
Thibaut Danho	50 m freestyle	DNS		did not advance			

Women

Athlete	Event	Heat		Semifinal		Final	
Athlete	Event	Time	Rank	Time	Rank	Time	Rank
Lucie Kouadio-Patinier	50 m butterfly	35.43	62	did not advance			
Lucie Kouadio-Patinier	100 m butterfly	1:26.46	52	did not advance			
Talita Te Flan	400 m freestyle	4:34.04	36	—		did not advance	
Talita Te Flan	800 m freestyle	9:21.19	38	—		did not advance	
