= Swimming at the 2017 World Aquatics Championships – Women's 400 metre freestyle =

Women's 400 metre freestyle at the 2017 World Aquatics Championships
- Venue: Danube Arena
- Location: Budapest, Hungary
- Dates: 23 July (heats and final)
- Competitors: 36 from 30 nations
- Winning time: 3:58.34

Medalists
gold medal	Katie Ledecky	United States
silver medal	Leah Smith	United States
bronze medal	Li Bingjie	China

The Women's 400 metre freestyle competition at the 2017 World Championships was held on 23 July 2017.

== Records ==
Prior to the competition, the existing world and championship records were as follows.

World record	Katie Ledecky (USA)	3:56.46	Rio de Janeiro, Brazil	7 August 2016
Competition record	Katie Ledecky (USA)	3:59.13	Kazan, Russia	2 August 2015

The following new records were set during this competition.

Date	Event	Name	Nationality	Time	Record
23 July	Heat	Katie Ledecky	United States	3:59.06	CR
23 July	Final	Katie Ledecky	United States	3:58.34	CR

== Results ==
=== Heats ===
The heats were held at 10:52.

Rank	Heat	Lane	Name	Nationality	Time	Notes
1	4	4	Katie Ledecky	United States	3:59.06	Q, CR
2	3	4	Leah Smith	United States	4:02.00	Q
3	4	3	Ariarne Titmus	Australia	4:04.26	Q
4	3	5	Li Bingjie	China	4:04.94	Q
5	4	5	Boglárka Kapás	Hungary	4:05.93	Q
6	4	6	Zhang Yuhan	China	4:06.21	Q
7	4	7	Veronika Popova	Russia	4:06.40	Q
8	3	2	Ajna Késely	Hungary	4:06.48	Q
9	3	6	Anja Klinar	Slovenia	4:07.75	
10	3	3	Mireia Belmonte	Spain	4:09.55	
11	4	0	Mary-Sophie Harvey	Canada	4:09.74	
12	4	8	Mackenzie Padington	Canada	4:09.88	
13	2	4	Diana Duraes	Portugal	4:10.07	
14	3	8	Joanna Maranhão	Brazil	4:11.06	
15	4	2	Holly Hibbott	Great Britain	4:12.77	
16	3	0	Leah Neale	Australia	4:13.38	
17	2	1	Barbora Závadová	Czech Republic	4:13.85	
18	4	9	Lee Ea-sop	South Korea	4:13.94	
19	3	1	Arina Openysheva	Russia	4:15.45	
20	3	9	Julia Hassler	Liechtenstein	4:17.05	
21	3	7	Andreina Pinto	Venezuela	4:17.46	
22	2	5	Monique Olivier	Luxembourg	4:18.04	
23	2	9	Marina Hansen	Denmark	4:18.86	
24	2	7	Nicole Oliva	Philippines	4:19.23	
25	2	6	Helena Moreno	Costa Rica	4:19.27	
26	2	2	Sze Hang Yu	Hong Kong	4:20.57	
27	2	3	Kate Beavon	South Africa	4:20.82	
28	2	0	Hania Moro	Egypt	4:21.67	
29	2	8	Ressa Dewi	Indonesia	4:24.05	
30	1	3	Gabriella Doueihy	Lebanon	4:25.34	
31	1	1	Talita Te Flan	Ivory Coast	4:26.72	
32	1	5	Sudthirak Watcharabusaracum	Thailand	4:30.96	
33	1	4	Daniella van den Berg	Aruba	4:32.09	
34	1	6	Hannah Gill	Barbados	4:42.55	
35	1	7	Ishani Senanayake	Sri Lanka	4:45.48	
36	1	2	Victoria Chentsova	Northern Mariana Islands	4:47.15	
	4	1	Nguyễn Thị Ánh Viên	Vietnam	DNS	

=== Final ===
The final was held at 18:03.

Rank	Lane	Name	Nationality	Time	Notes
1st place, gold medalist(s)	4	Katie Ledecky	United States	3:58.34	CR
2nd place, silver medalist(s)	5	Leah Smith	United States	4:01.54	
3rd place, bronze medalist(s)	6	Li Bingjie	China	4:03.25	
4	3	Ariarne Titmus	Australia	4:04.26	
5	2	Boglárka Kapás	Hungary	4:04.77	
6	8	Ajna Késely	Hungary	4:05.75	
7	7	Zhang Yuhan	China	4:06.03	
8	1	Veronika Popova	Russia	4:07.59	
