= Barbados at the 2022 World Aquatics Championships =

- Flag of Barbados
- FINA code: BAR
- National federation: Barbados Amateur Swimming Association
- Website: www.swimbarbados.com

in Budapest, Hungary
- Competitors: 2 in 1 sport
- Medals: Gold 0 Silver 0 Bronze 0 Total 0

World Aquatics Championships appearances
- 1973; 1975; 1978; 1982; 1986; 1991; 1994; 1998; 2001; 2003; 2005; 2007; 2009; 2011; 2013; 2015; 2017; 2019; 2022; 2023; 2024

Barbados competed at the 2022 World Aquatics Championships in Budapest, Hungary from 18 June to 3 July.

== Swimming ==
Barbadian swimmers have achieved qualifying standards in the following events.

Athlete	Event	Heat		Semifinal		Final	
Athlete	Event	Time	Rank	Time	Rank	Time	Rank
Jack Kirby	Men's 50 m backstroke	26.11	30	did not advance			
Jack Kirby	Men's 100 m backstroke	DNS					
Danielle Titus	Women's 100 m backstroke	1:03.79	27	did not advance			
Danielle Titus	Women's 200 m backstroke	2:21.34	20	did not advance			
