= Thailand at the 2013 World Aquatics Championships =

- Flag of Thailand
- FINA code: THA
- National federation: Thailand Swimming Association
- Website: www.tasa.in.th

in Barcelona, Spain
- Competitors: 15 in 2 sports
- Medals: Gold 0 Silver 0 Bronze 0 Total 0

World Aquatics Championships appearances
- 1973; 1975; 1978; 1982; 1986; 1991; 1994; 1998; 2001; 2003; 2005; 2007; 2009; 2011; 2013; 2015; 2017; 2019; 2022; 2023; 2024

Thailand is competing at the 2013 World Aquatics Championships in Barcelona, Spain between 19 July and 4 August 2013.

== Swimming ==
Thai swimmers achieved qualifying standards in the following events (up to a maximum of 2 swimmers in each event at the A-standard entry time, and 1 at the B-standard):

Men

Athlete	Event	Heat		Semifinal		Final	
Athlete	Event	Time	Rank	Time	Rank	Time	Rank
Nuttapong Ketin	200 m breaststroke	2:19.71	39	did not advance			
Nuttapong Ketin	400 m individual medley	4:30.67	34	—		did not advance	
Radomyos Matjiur	50 m breaststroke	29.41	53	did not advance			
Radomyos Matjiur	100 m breaststroke	1:03.27	46	did not advance			

Women

Athlete	Event	Heat		Semifinal		Final	
Athlete	Event	Time	Rank	Time	Rank	Time	Rank
Natthanan Junkrajang	200 m freestyle	2:01.02	27	did not advance			
Natthanan Junkrajang	400 m freestyle	4:19.77	26	—		did not advance	
Benjaporn Sriphanomithorn	100 m freestyle	58.33	50	did not advance			
Benjaporn Sriphanomithorn	800 m freestyle	9:05.32	31	—		did not advance	

== Synchronized swimming ==
Thailand has qualified eleven synchronized swimmers.

Athlete	Event	Preliminaries		Final	
Athlete	Event	Points	Rank	Points	Rank
Dhitaya Tanabunsombat	Solo free routine	54.960	34	did not advance	
Dhitaya Tanabunsombat	Solo technical routine	55.200	35	did not advance	
Aphichaya Saengrusamee; Arpapat Saengrusamee	Duet free routine	56.090	37	did not advance	
Aphichaya Saengrusamee; Arpapat Saengrusamee	Duet technical routine	55.400	33	did not advance	
Suthinisa Jangjun; Arthittaya Kittithanatpum; Nantaya Polsen; Aphichaya Saengrusamee; Arpapat Saengrusamee; Chananamon Sangakul; Dhitaya Tanabunsombat; Busarin Tanabutchot; Nujarin Tanabutchot; Pasana Tongsakul*; Manisorn Tritipetsuwan	Free routine combination	58.730	17	did not advance	
