= Anna Gual =

Spanish water polo player (born 1996)

Personal information
- Full name: Anna Gual Rovirosa
- Born: 30 May 1996 (age 30) Barcelona, Spain
- Height: 1.72 m (5 ft 8 in)
- Weight: 71 kg (157 lb)

Sport
- Sport: Water polo
- Position: Field player
- Number: 10
National team
- Years: Team
- 2017—: Spain
Medal record
World Championships
Silver medal – second place	2017 Budapest	Team
European Championships
Bronze medal – third place	2018 Barcelona	Team
Mediterranean Games
Gold medal – first place	2018 Tarragona	Team

Anna Gual Rovirosa (born 30 May 1996) is a Spanish water polo player who won the silver medal at the 2017 FINA World Championships

In 2018 she won the gold medal at the Mediterranean Games and the bronze at the European Water Polo Championship

== See also ==
- List of World Aquatics Championships medalists in water polo
