= Ivory Coast at the 2011 World Aquatics Championships =

- Flag of Ivory Coast
- FINA code: CIV
- National federation: Federation Ivorienne de Natation et de Sauvetagé

in Shanghai, China
- Competitors: 3 in 1 sports
- Medals: Gold 0 Silver 0 Bronze 0 Total 0

World Aquatics Championships appearances
- 2001; 2003; 2005; 2007; 2009; 2011; 2013; 2015; 2017; 2019; 2022; 2023; 2024

Ivory Coast competed at the 2011 World Aquatics Championships in Shanghai, China between July 16 and 31, 2011.

== Swimming ==
Ivory Coast qualified 3 swimmers.

Men

Athlete	Event	Heats		Semifinals		Final	
Athlete	Event	Time	Rank	Time	Rank	Time	Rank
Brou Kouassi Olivier	Men's 50m Freestyle	25.81	71	did not advance			
Atta Tano Claver	Men's 100m Freestyle	59.70	87	did not advance			

Women

Athlete	Event	Heats		Semifinals		Final	
Athlete	Event	Time	Rank	Time	Rank	Time	Rank
Toure Assita	Women's 50m Freestyle	34.45	77	did not advance			
