= Ivory Coast at the 2013 World Aquatics Championships =

- Flag of Ivory Coast
- FINA code: CIV
- National federation: Federation Ivorienne de Natation et de Sauvetagé

in Barcelona, Spain
- Competitors: 3 in 1 sports
- Medals: Gold 0 Silver 0 Bronze 0 Total 0

World Aquatics Championships appearances
- 2001; 2003; 2005; 2007; 2009; 2011; 2013; 2015; 2017; 2019; 2022; 2023; 2024

Ivory Coast competed at the 2013 World Aquatics Championships in Barcelona, Spain from 19 July to 4 August 2013.

== Swimming ==
Ivorian swimmers achieved qualifying standards in the following events (up to a maximum of 2 swimmers in each event at the A-standard entry time, and 1 at the B-standard):

Men

| Athlete | Event | Heat | | Semifinal | | Final | |
| Athlete | Event | Time | Rank | Time | Rank | Time | Rank |
|---|---|---|---|---|---|---|---|
| Sylla Alassane | 100 m freestyle | DNS | | did not advance | | | |
| Sylla Alassane | 100 m butterfly | 1:03.49 | 56 | did not advance | | | |
| Pierre Tano | 50 m freestyle | 26.41 | =79 | did not advance | | | |

Women

| Athlete | Event | Heat | | Semifinal | | Final | |
| Athlete | Event | Time | Rank | Time | Rank | Time | Rank |
|---|---|---|---|---|---|---|---|
| Vanessa Kokoe | 50 m breaststroke | DNS | | did not advance | | | |
