= British Colour Council =

British industry standards organisation

The British Colour Council (BCC) was an industry standards organisation, active from the 1930s to the 1950s, which produced indexes of named colours for use by government, industry, academia, and horticulture.

== 1930s ==
Founded in 1931 and chaired by designer Robert Francis Wilson, the BCC produced the British Colour Council reference Code or British Colour Codes: indexes of named colours for a variety of industries.

=== "Dictionary of Colour Standards" ===
Its first major work was the British Colour Council 1934 "Dictionary of Colour Standards" which defined colour shades in its printed plates and gave a two or three number code and evocative names to each colour. BCC colour codes define colours as varying by hue, tone and intensity, and were originally designed for use in the textile dye industry. The colour names given by the BCC were particularly descriptive and often referred to flora or fauna, with titles such as Larkspur ("No. 196"), Forget-Me-Not ("No. 84"), Bee Eater Blue, Kermes, and Squirrel. The codes of the BCC became standards for identifying colours used in everything from the Royal Horticultural Society, to British government planning commission maps, the British Army, Royal Institute of British Architects, and the Royal Mail. BCC codes, due to their subtlety of hue in comparison with previous standards, were useful for the precise colour matching necessary in fields as diverse as dermatology and the classification of Chinese porcelain.

=== "Dictionary of Colours for Interior Decoration" ===
As the British Colour Council developed its services to industry it became apparent that the bias in the dictionary towards colours for textiles made it less relevant as a standard reference work for interior decoration. Some colours which were suitable for clothes were insufficiently permanent for application to carpets, curtains and upholstery fabric, while others were technically impracticable for use in the pottery and glass industries, in porcelain and vitreous enamel or in the making of paint or other materials used in decorating.

In 1949 the council published the "Dictionary of Colours for Interior Decoration". This work consisted of three volumes, two of colour samples and the other a slim list of names and a history of the colours.

The 378 colours illustrated were shown on three surfaces – matt, gloss and a pile fabric (like carpet). One reference name and number was given for the colour shown in three forms, and it was stressed that the surface required should be made clear when the dictionary was used to specify a colour match.

=== Horticulture ===
In the late 1930s the BCC produced books for use in horticulture. Its first (1938) version included 200 named hues, printed as three lightnesses each for a total of 600 colours, each given distinctive names; later editions included four tints per hue, making a total of 800 colours.

=== "British Colours" ===
The BCC also advised the 1937 royal coronation, providing "Traditional British Colours" for flags and street decorations.

== Postwar ==
The BCC, under the Chairmanship of British lighting industry executive Leslie Hubble, continued to publish colour codes through the 1960s, and while largely supplanted by the British Standards organisation, and commercial colour standards such as Pantone, the BCC codes are still referred to by industries in the United Kingdom and used as standards for some British Commonwealth flags, academic robes and horticulture. BCC colour standards were also used extensively in the defence field in Commonwealth nations until being replaced towards the end of the twentieth century by the American Pantone Matching System.

The council, as well as functioning as an oversight body, operated a reference publishing house and its British Colour Education Institute, after the Second World War at 13 Portman Square, London, W1, and later at 10A Chandos St, W1M 9DE.
