= Ivory Coast at the 2024 World Aquatics Championships =

- Flag of Ivory Coast
- FINA code: CIV
- National federation: Ivorian Federation of Swimming and Rescue

in Doha, Qatar
- Competitors: 2 in 1 sport
- Medals: Gold 0 Silver 0 Bronze 0 Total 0

World Aquatics Championships appearances
- 2001; 2003; 2005; 2007; 2009; 2011; 2013; 2015; 2017; 2019; 2022; 2023; 2024

Ivory Coast competed at the 2024 World Aquatics Championships in Doha, Qatar from 2 to 18 February.

== Competitors ==
The following is the list of competitors in the Championships.

Sport	Men	Women	Total
Swimming	1	1	2
Total	1	1	2

== Swimming ==
Ivory Coast entered 2 swimmers.

Men

Athlete	Event	Heat		Semifinal		Final	
Athlete	Event	Time	Rank	Time	Rank	Time	Rank
Charles Levi Avi	50 metre freestyle	27.21	97	Did not advance			
Charles Levi Avi	50 metre butterfly	30.19	62	Did not advance			

Women

Athlete	Event	Heat		Semifinal		Final	
Athlete	Event	Time	Rank	Time	Rank	Time	Rank
Assita Diarra	50 metre freestyle	41.35	106	Did not advance			
Assita Diarra	50 metre backstroke	58.14	55	Did not advance			
