= Sudthirak Watcharabusaracum =

Thai swimmer

Personal information
- Born: 2 May 2000 (age 26)

Sport
- Sport: Swimming

Sudthirak Watcharabusaracum (born 2 May 2000) is a Thai swimmer. She competed in the women's 400 metre freestyle event at the 2017 World Aquatics Championships.
