= Hannah Gill =

Barbadian swimmer (born 1999)

Personal information
- Born: 29 June 1999 (age 27)

Sport
- Sport: Swimming

Hannah Gill (born 29 June 1999) is a Barbadian swimmer. She competed in the women's 400 metre freestyle event at the 2017 World Aquatics Championships.
