= Dulyawat Kaewsriyong =

Thai swimmer (born 2002)

Personal information
- Native name: ดุลยวัต เเก้วศรียงค์
- National team: Thailand
- Born: August 13, 2002 (age 24) Trang province, Thailand

Sport
- Sport: Swimming
- Club: Bangkok Elite Swim Team
Medal record
Men's swimming
Representing Thailand
Southeast Asian Games
Silver medal – second place	2023 SEA Games	4×100 m freestyle relay
Bronze medal – third place	2023 Phnom Penh	4×200 m freestyle relay
Bronze medal – third place	2023 Phnom Penh	4×100 m mixed freestyle relay
Bronze medal – third place	2023 Phnom Penh	4×100 m mixed medley relay

Dulyawat Kaewsriyong (Thai: ดุลยวัต แก้วศรียงค์; born 13 August 2002) is a Thai professional swimmer. He represented in many competitions such as 2024 Summer Olympics and 2023 SEA Games.

Dulyawat represented in the 2023 SEA Games in Phnom Penh. He won individual silver medals in 4 × 100 m freestyle relay, and bronze medals in 4 × 200 m freestyle relay, 4 × 100 m mixed freestyle relay, and 4 × 100 m mixed medley relay. In 2024, he got competed in the 2024 Summer Olympics, competing in the heats of the men's 100-metre freestyle.
