= Thibaut Amani Danho =

Ivorian swimmer

Personal information
- Born: 15 January 1994 (age 32)

Sport
- Country: Ivory Coast
- Sport: Swimming

Thibaut Amani Danho (born 15 January 1994) is an Ivorian competitive swimmer. He competed at the 2016 Summer Olympics in Rio de Janeiro, in the men's 100 metre freestyle.
