= Navaphat Wongcharoen =

Thai swimmer (born 1997)

Personal information
- Born: 3 March 1997 (age 29) Bangkok, Thailand

Sport
- Sport: Swimming
- Strokes: Butterfly
Medal record
Men's swimming
Representing Thailand
Southeast Asian Games
Silver medal – second place	2019 Manila	200 m butterfly
Silver medal – second place	2023 Cambodia	4×100 m medley
Bronze medal – third place	2015 Singapore	4×100 m medley
Bronze medal – third place	2017 Kuala Lumpur	200 m butterfly
Bronze medal – third place	2021 Vietnam	4×100 m medley
Bronze medal – third place	2021 Vietnam	100 m butterfly

Navaphat Wongcharoen (Thai language: นวพรรษ วงค์เจริญ; born 3 March 1997) is a Thai swimmer. He represented Thailand at the 2019 World Aquatics Championships in Gwangju, South Korea. He competed in the men's 100 metre butterfly and men's 200 metre butterfly events.

In 2015, he won the bronze medal in the men's 4 × 100 metre medley relay event at the Southeast Asian Games held in Singapore. In 2018, he represented Thailand at the Asian Games held in Jakarta, Indonesia.
