= Talita Te Flan =

Italian-born Ivorian swimmer

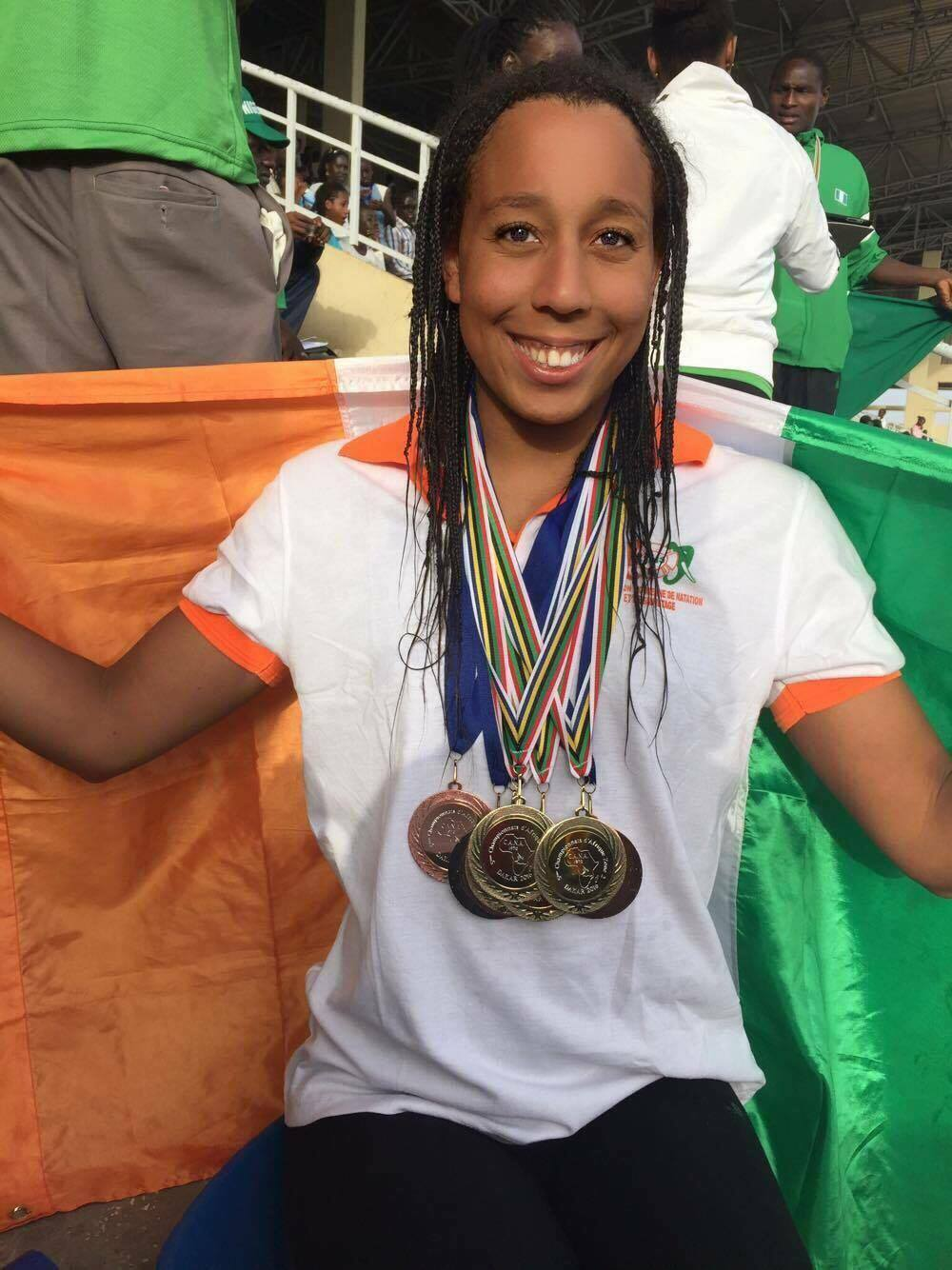
- Talita Te Flan in 2016

Personal information
- Full name: Talita Marie Te Flan
- National team: Ivory Coast
- Born: 2 June 1995 (age 31) Gavardo, Italy
- Height: 1.76 m (5 ft 9 in)
- Weight: 63 kg (139 lb)

Sport
- Sport: Swimming
- Strokes: Freestyle
- College team: Grand Canyon University (2019–2020); University of Wyoming (2016–2019)

Talita Marie Te Flan (born 2 June 1995) is an Italian-born Ivorian swimmer who competes internationally for the Ivory Coast. She competed in the women's 800 metre freestyle event at the 2016 Summer Olympics.

== Career ==
Te Flan was born to an Italian mother and an Ivorian father in 1995. She competed in swimming competitions in Italy, to national level. Representing the Ivory Coast, she competed in the women's 800 metre freestyle event at the 2015 World Aquatics Championships in Kazan, Russia. She finished 39th out of 44 competitors in the heats.

In May 2016, Te Flan took part in the 2016 West African Swimming Championships in Dakar, Senegal. She finished the meet as the most medalled athlete.

Te Flan made her Olympic debut at the 2016 Summer Olympics where she competed in the women's 800 metre event. She finished last of twenty-seven starters, but her time of 9:07.21 established a new national record.

As of August 2016, Te Flan is the national record holder in the 200m, 400m, 800m and 1500m freestyle events.

In 2019, she represented Ivory Coast at the 2019 World Aquatics Championships held in Gwangju, South Korea. She competed in the women's 400 metre freestyle and women's 800 metre freestyle events. In both events she did not advance to compete in the final.

At the 2020 Summer Olympics, she competed in the women's 400 metre freestyle event.
