= Thailand Swimming Association =

Sports governing body in Thailand

Thailand Aquatics Association
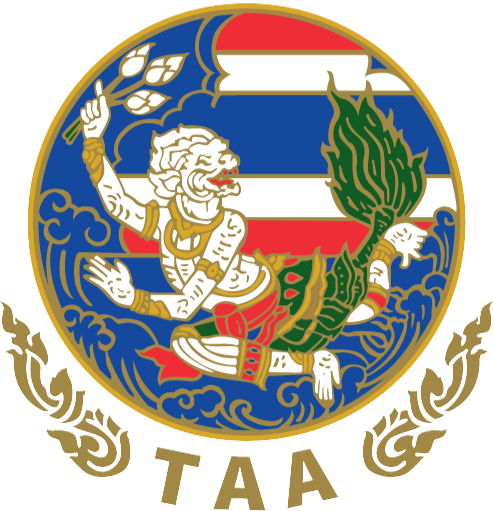
- Sport: Diving; Open Water Swimming; Masters Swimming; Swimming; Artistic swimming Water Polo
- Jurisdiction: National
- Abbreviation: TAA
- Founded: 24 June 1959; 66 years ago
- Affiliation: AQUA
- Affiliation date: 1961
- Regional affiliation: AA SEAA
- Headquarters: Bang Kapi, Bangkok
- President: Capt. Thamanat Prompow
- Vice president: Gen. Supon Junpong
- Secretary: Mr. Thanavit Thosakul

Official website
- www.thaiaquatics.or.th
- (Thailand)

Thailand Aquatics Association (ไทย: สมาคมกีฬาทางน้ำแห่งประเทศไทย; สนท) Acronym "TAA" Is a National sport government body for Aquatic sports in Thailand include: Swimming, High diving, Artistic swimming, Water polo, Open water swimming and Masters swimming. Establish on 24 June 1959, and registered with Royal Thai Police under the name of "Thailand Amuture Swimming Association" and have Vice admiral Sawat Phuthianan as First President of the association. And then affiliated with the World Aquatics (known as FINA: Fédération internationale de natation" during that time) in 1961.

In 2005, "Thailand Amuture Swimming Association" change the name to "Thailand Swimming Association: TASA" (ไทย: สมาคมว่ายน้ำแห่งประเทศไทย; สวท) and became recognize sport government body under the certification of Sports Authority of Thailand and National Olympic Committee of Thailand and current President of Thailand Swimming association is Gen. Prawit Wongsuwon.

Thailand Swimming Association have a duty to supervise athletes training, competition venue, organizing national competition, and organizing an athletes team for Swimming, High diving and Artistic swimming. Both in 50m pool (Long Course) and 25m Pool (Short Course) which is popular in the International-Level i.e. SEA Games, Asian Games, World cup and Olympic Games and for junior level i.e. Sea Age Group, Asian Age Group and Asian Swimming Championships.

In 2015, Thailand Swimming Association: TASA (ไทย: สมาคมว่ายน้ำแห่งประเทศไทย; สวท) has undergo minor change to Thailand Swimming Association: TSA (ไทย: สมาคมกีฬา ว่ายน้ำแห่งประเทศไทย; ส.ว.ท) and more sport has been added from originally 3 sports to Swimming, High diving, Artistic swimming, Water polo, Masters swimming and Open water swimming

In 2024, Thailand Swimming Association has undergo another change to "Thailand Aquatics Association: TAA" (ไทย: สมาคมทางน้ำแห่งประเทศไทย; สนท) for modernize and be consistent with World Aquatics, and to compliance with Sport Authority of Thailand Act B.E. 2563 \

== Championships ==
Thailand Aquatics Association organises championships every year in each of the sporting disciplines.

=== Swimming ===
Long course

Year	Dates	Venue	Notes
2017	1–5 April	Thammasat University Aquatics Centre, Pathum Thani	World Championships Trials
2018	7–11 April	Assumption University Aquatics Centre, Samut Prakan	World Championships Trials
2019	5-10 April	Assumption University Aquatics Centre, Samut Prakan	World Championships Trials
2020	11-13 October (Group 3,4) 23 - 25 October (Group Open, 1, 2)	Assumption University Aquatics Centre, Samut Prakan	World Championships Trials
2021	8 - 14 August	Assumption University Aquatics Centre, Samut Prakan	World Championships Trials
2022	5 - 10 April	Assumption University Aquatics Centre, Samut Prakan	World Championships Trials
2023	6 - 11 April	Assumption University Aquatics Centre, Samut Prakan	World Championships Trials
2024	6 - 11 April	Assumption University Aquatics Centre, Samut Prakan	World Championships Trials

Short course

Year	Dates	Venue	Notes
2016	1–3 October	Assumption University Aquatics Centre, Samut Prakan	World Championships Trials
2019	25 - 27 October	Assumption University Aquatics Centre, Samut Prakan	World Championships Trials
2022	21 - 23 October	Assumption University Aquatics Centre, Samut Prakan	World Championships Trials
2023	21 - 24 December	Assumption University Aquatics Centre, Samut Prakan	World Championships Trials
2024	19 - 22 September	Assumption University Aquatics Centre, Samut Prakan	World Championships Trials

=== Master swimming ===
Year	Dates	Venue
2017	11 March	Huamark Aquatics Centre, Bangkok

=== Open water swimming ===
Year	Dates	Venue	Notes
2017	8 April	Sattahip, Chonburi	Southeast Asian Games Trials

=== Diving ===
Year	Dates	Venue
2017	4–5 April	Thammasat University Aquatics Centre, Pathum Thani

=== Water Polo ===
Year	Dates	Venue	Notes
2021	10 - 12 December	Chulabhorn Walailak Swimming Pool, Kasetsart University	
2022	7 - 14 November	Assumption University Aquatics Centre, Samut Prakan	2022 Asian Water Polo Championship
2023	11 - 13 August	CMU Swimming Pool, Chiang Mai University, Chiang Mai	
2024	13 - 21 June	SAT Swimming Pool, Sport Authority of Thailand	Phase 1 (13 - 16 June) Phase 2 (19 - 21 June)

== Sponsors ==
The following are the sponsors of Thailand Aquatics Association:

- National Sport Development Fund
- Sport Authority of Thailand
- Grand Sport
- CH. Karnchang Public Company Limited
- PTT GC
- PTT Group
- Bangchak Corporation
- ThaiOil
- Mitr Phol Group
- Arena

== See also ==
- List of Thai records in swimming
