= Jenjira Srisa-ard =

Thai swimmer (born 1995)

Personal information
- Nickname: Joy
- Nationality: Thai
- Born: 16 April 1995 (age 31) Bangkok, Thailand

Sport
- Sport: Swimming
- Strokes: Freestyle, Butterfly and Breaststroke
Medal record
Women's swimming
Representing Thailand
Asian Indoor and Martial Arts Games
Gold medal – first place	2013 Incheon	50 m freestyle
Gold medal – first place	2013 Incheon	4 × 50 m freestyle relay
Gold medal – first place	2017 Ashgabat	50 m freestyle
Gold medal – first place	2017 Ashgabat	50 m butterfly
Silver medal – second place	2013 Incheon	4 × 100 m freestyle relay
Silver medal – second place	2017 Ashgabat	50 m breaststroke
Silver medal – second place	2017 Ashgabat	4 × 50 m medley relay
Bronze medal – third place	2017 Ashgabat	4 × 50 m freestyle relay
Bronze medal – third place	2017 Ashgabat	4 × 100 m freestyle relay
Bronze medal – third place	2017 Ashgabat	4 × 100 m medley relay
Southeast Asian Games
Gold medal – first place	2021 Vietnam	50 m butterfly
Gold medal – first place	2021 Vietnam	50 m freestyle
Gold medal – first place	2023 Cambodia	50 m breaststroke
Gold medal – first place	2023 Cambodia	50 m butterfly
Silver medal – second place	2017 Kuala Lumpur	50 m butterfly
Silver medal – second place	2017 Kuala Lumpur	4×100 m freestyle
Silver medal – second place	2019 Philippines	50 m freestyle
Silver medal – second place	2019 Philippines	50 m breaststroke
Silver medal – second place	2019 Philippines	50 m butterfly
Silver medal – second place	2021 Vietnam	50 m breaststroke
Silver medal – second place	2021 Vietnam	100 m freestyle
Silver medal – second place	2021 Vietnam	4×100 m freestyle
Silver medal – second place	2025 Thailand	50 m breaststroke
Bronze medal – third place	2017 Kuala Lumpur	50 m freestyle
Bronze medal – third place	2019 Philippines	4×100 m freestyle
Bronze medal – third place	2023 Cambodia	4×100 m freestyle
Bronze medal – third place	2023 Cambodia	4×100 m medley relay
Bronze medal – third place	2023 Cambodia	50 m freestyle
Bronze medal – third place	2025 Thailand	50 m butterfly
ASEAN University Games
Gold medal – first place	2016 Singapore	50 m butterfly
Silver medal – second place	2016 Singapore	50 m freestyle
Silver medal – second place	2016 Singapore	50 m breaststroke

Jenjira Srisaard (Thai: เจนจิรา ศรีสอาด; born 16 April 1995) is a Thai swimmer.

She competed in the women's 50 metre butterfly and women's 50 metre freestyle events at the 2012 FINA World Swimming Championships (25 m) held in Istanbul, Turkey. The following year, she competed in competed in short course swimming at the 2013 Asian Indoor and Martial Arts Games held in Incheon, South Korea. She also competed at the 2013 Southeast Asian Games held in Naypyidaw, Myanmar.

In 2017, she won two gold medals, two silver medals and three bronze medals in short course swimming at the 2017 Asian Indoor and Martial Arts Games held in Ashgabat, Turkmenistan. In 2018, she competed in swimming at the 2018 Asian Games held in Jakarta, Indonesia.

In 2019, she represented Thailand at the 2019 World Aquatics Championships held in Gwangju, South Korea. She competed in the women's 50 metre butterfly and women's 50 metre breaststroke events and in both events she did not advance to compete in the semi-finals.

In 2021, she represented Thailand at the 2020 Tokyo Olympic Games held in Tokyo, Japan. She competed in Women's 100 metre Freestyle and Women's 50 metre Freestyle events and in both events she did not advance to compete in the semi-finals.

She competed in the women's 4 × 100 metre freestyle relay at the 2022 World Aquatics Championships held in Budapest, Hungary.
