= Flag of Barbados =

Barbados
- The Broken Trident
- Use: National flag, civil and state ensign
- Proportion: 2:3
- Adopted: 30 November 1966; 59 years ago
- Design: A vertical triband of ultramarine (hoist-side and fly-side) and gold with the black trident-head centred on the gold band.
- Designed by: Grantley W. Prescod
- Use: Naval ensign
- Proportion: 1:2
- Design: A red cross on a white field, the national flag in the canton

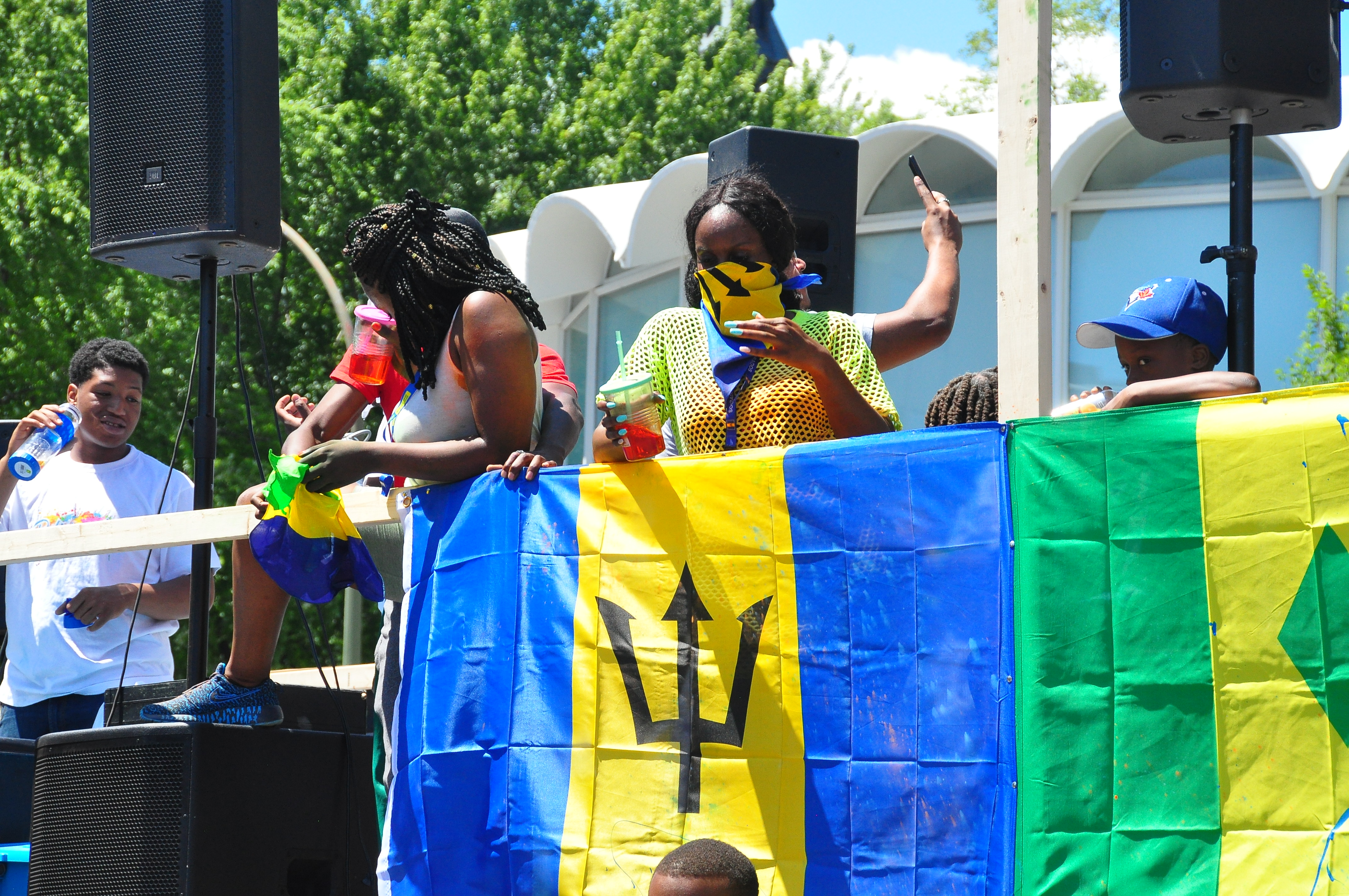
Barbados flag at Carifiesta 2018, Montreal

The flag of Barbados was designed by Grantley W. Prescod and was officially adopted to represent Barbados at midnight on 30 November 1966, the day the country gained independence.

The flag was chosen as part of a nationwide open contest held by the government. Prescod's design won the over a field of one thousand entries. The flag is a triband design, with the outermost stripes coloured ultramarine, to represent the sea and the sky, and the middle stripe coloured gold, to represent the sand. Within the middle band is displayed the head of a trident. This trident is meant to represent the trident of Poseidon, most visibly held by Britannia in Barbados' colonial coat-of-arms. The fact that it is broken is meant to represent the breaking of colonial rule in Barbados and independence from the British Empire.

After Prescod's design was selected as the winner of the contest, he was asked to make several flags as a personal request from Errol Barrow, the nation's first prime minister. Prescod constructed seven flags out of fabrics purchased from a department store. The flag was raised for the first time in a ceremony by Lieutenant Hartley Dottin of the Barbados Regiment.

From its independence in 1966, Barbados also had a royal standard for Queen Elizabeth II and a standard for the governor-general until 2021 when these flags were retired after Barbados officially became a republic. Barbados now uses the Presidential Standard.

== History ==
After some time as a British colony, Barbados became part of the British Windward Islands in 1833, with the Union Jack as its official flag. It was reestablished as the colony of Barbados in 1885 and remained that way until 1958; during this time, the flag of the colony consisted of a Blue Ensign which was defaced with the colonial seal. From 1958 to 1962, Barbados was under the control of the West Indies Federation, who used the so-called "Sun and Seas Flag", consisting of a circular orange "sun" atop a blue field with four wavy white lines. After control was retaken by the United Kingdom from 1962 to 1966, following the dissolution of the West Indies Federation, the Barbadian legislature made their case for independence. Barbados became an independent nation on 30 November 1966. At midnight on that day, the modern-day flag came into effect as the first official flag of an independent Barbados and was raised for the first time in a ceremony by Lieutenant Hartley Dottin, a member of the Barbados Regiment.

The design of the flag was created by Grantley W. Prescod, an art teacher at Parkinson School in Barbados. It was chosen as the winner of an open competition arranged by the Barbados government and judged by seven individuals. Over one thousand entries were received, with the exact number being 1,029. He was awarded a $500 cash prize, which was donated to a popular newspaper publishing company, a scroll from the Barbadian government, and a gold medal. In addition to designing the flag, Prescod also constructed the first physical flags, at the request of Prime Minister Errol Barrow. Prescod made six or seven flags, which were printed at Parkinson School.

Flag of the British Windward Islands (Union Jack), 1833–1885

Flag of the Colony of Barbados, 1885–1962 and 1962–1966

Flag of the West Indies Federation, 1958–1962

== Design ==
The trident symbol featured in the flag of Barbados

The flag consists of a triband: two bands of ultramarine represent the sky and the ocean, and a golden middle band represents the island's sand. A black trident head, commonly called the "Broken Trident", is centred in the golden band. The trident symbol was taken from Barbados' colonial seal. The broken lower part symbolises a symbolic break from its status as a colony. The three points of the trident represent the three principles of democracy: government of the people, government for the people, and government by the people.

=== Colours ===
The official British Standard colour code numbers for the flag are: Ultramarine — BCC 148, Gold — BS O/002. The Pantone colours of the Barbadian flag are:

| Colors scheme | Blue | Yellow | Black |
|---|---|---|---|
| Pantone | 280 C | 123 C | Black |
| HEX | #1F367C | #F3B100 | #000000 |
| RGB | 31, 54, 124 | 243, 177, 0 | 0, 0, 0 |
| CMYK | 75, 56, 0, 51 | 0, 27, 100, 5 | 0, 0, 0, 100 |
| British Standard | BCC 148 (Ultramarine) | 2660-0002 (Oxlip) | 00-E-53 (Black) |

== Variant flags ==
From its independence in 1966, Barbados has had standards for Queen Elizabeth II, the governor-general, and the prime minister. The royal standard, Queen Elizabeth's Personal Barbadian flag, consisted of a yellow field with a blue circular disk containing the letter "E" and a crown in the centre, surrounded by gold roses; this logo is displayed on Elizabeth II's personal flag. This logo is placed atop a bearded fig (Ficus citrifolia), and a pride of Barbados flower (Caesalpinia pulcherrima) is displayed in each upper corner. This flag was used only when the Queen was visiting the nation or representing them abroad as their head of state. The standard of the governor-general was a navy blue field with St Edward's Crown in the centre; atop the crown sits a lion which is itself crowned, and below the crown is displayed a banner which reads "BARBADOS". Both of these flags were retired when Barbados ceased to be a Commonwealth realm, instead becoming a republic effective 30 November 2021.

The standard of the prime minister consists of the coat of arms within a white circle at the flag's centre. From the upper-left to the lower-right of the flag runs a black- and white-striped rope, which fimbriates the white circle and the line dividing the portion of the field coloured blue and the portion of the field coloured yellow. This flag was introduced with the first prime minister in 1966 and is still in use. The standard of the president consists a dark navy field with the coat of arms in the centre, surrounded by a wreath of gold flowers. Just below the arms is a small version of the "broken trident" symbol, coloured gold.

The Barbadian naval ensign follows much the same pattern as that of the United Kingdom, the White Ensign; rather than a Union Jack, the canton is occupied by the national flag of Barbados. The Barbados Defence Force, the nation's combined armed forces, has its own flag as well, consisting of the organisation's logo atop a green field.

Royal standard (1966–2021)

Standard of the Governor-General (1966–2021)

Standard of the Prime Minister (1966–present)

Standard of the President (2021–present)

== See also ==
- National symbols of Barbados
- List of Barbadian flags
