= Thailand at the 2011 World Aquatics Championships =

Sporting event delegation

Flag of Thailand

Thailand competed at the 2011 World Aquatics Championships in Shanghai, China between July 16 and 31, 2011.

== Swimming ==
Thailand qualified 3 swimmers.

Men

Athlete	Event	Heats		Semifinals		Final	
Athlete	Event	Time	Rank	Time	Rank	Time	Rank
Nuttapong Ketin	Men's 200m Breaststroke	2:14.68	28	did not advance			
Nuttapong Ketin	Men's 400m IM	4:26.41	24			did not advance	

Women

Athlete	Event	Heats		Semifinals		Final	
Athlete	Event	Time	Rank	Time	Rank	Time	Rank
Natthanan Junkrajang	Women's 100m Freestyle	56.86	38	did not advance			
Natthanan Junkrajang	Women's 200m Freestyle	2:03.68	39	did not advance			
Natthanan Junkrajang	Women's 200m IM	2:20.38	31	did not advance			
Natthanan Junkrajang	Women's 400m IM	5:03.07	32			did not advance	
Benjaporn Sriphanomthorn	Women's 400m Freestyle	4:29.65	35			did not advance	
Benjaporn Sriphanomthorn	Women's 800m Freestyle	9:08.40	31			did not advance	

== Synchronised swimming ==
Thailand has qualified 12 athletes in synchronised swimming.

Women

Athlete	Event	Preliminary		Final	
Athlete	Event	Points	Rank	Points	Rank
Nantaya Polsen	Solo Technical Routine	67.900	30	did not advance	
Thanyaluck Puttisiriroj	Solo Free Routine	65.390	30	did not advance	
Arthittaya Kittithanatphum; Nantaya Polsen	Duet Technical Routine	67.800	37	did not advance	
Arthittaya Kittithanatphum; Nantaya Polsen	Duet Free Routine	66.560	39	did not advance	
Thinatta Kanchanakanti; Arthittaya Kittithanatphum; Natchanat Krasachol; Nantaya Polsen; Thanyaluck Puttisiriroj; Chanamon Sangakul; Busarin Tanabutchot; Nujarin Tanabutchot	Team Technical Routine	67.400	21	did not advance	
Thinatta Kanchanakanti; Arthittaya Kittithanatphum; Natchanat Krasachol; Nantaya Polsen; Thanyaluck Puttisiriroj; Chanamon Sangakul; Busarin Tanabutchot; Nujarin Tanabutchot	Team Free Routine	67.430	20	did not advance	
Thinatta Kanchanakanti; Arthittaya Kittithanatphum; Natchanat Krasachol; Nantaya Polsen; Thanyaluck Puttisiriroj; Chanamon Sangakul; Busarin Tanabutchot; Nujarin Tanabutchot; Manisorn Tritiprtsuwan; Ravisara Vathagavorakul	Free Routine Combination	69.700	13	did not advance	

Reserves

- Aphichaya Saengrusamee
- Arpapat Saengrusamee
