= 2024 World Aquatics Swimming Championships (25 m) – Men's 200 metre breaststroke =

Swimming competition

Men's 200 metre breaststroke at the 2024 World Aquatics Swimming Championships (25 m)
- Venue: Duna Arena
- Location: Budapest, Hungary
- Dates: 13 December
- Competitors: 42 from 38 nations
- Winning time: 2:01.55

Medalists
gold medal	Carles Coll	Spain
silver medal	Kirill Prigoda
bronze medal	Yamato Fukasawa	Japan

The Men's 200 metre breaststroke competition of the 2024 World Aquatics Swimming Championships (25 m) was held on 13 December 2024.

== Records ==
Prior to the competition, the existing world and championship records were as follows:

World record	Kirill Prigoda (RUS)	2:00.16	Hangzhou, China	13 December 2018
Competition record	Kirill Prigoda (RUS)	2:00.16	Hangzhou, China	13 December 2018

== Background ==
The event featured Japan’s Daiya Seto, the second-fastest performer in history with a 2:00.35 from 2022, but he entered the meet with uncertainty due to a recent rib injury. Russia’s Kirill Prigoda, competing as a Neutral Athlete and the world record holder (2:00.16), was the favourite, having posted a 2:01.85 in November—his fastest time since 2020. Australia’s Joshua Yong entered with an Oceanian record and had the fastest qualifying time after winning the event at the Shanghai stop of the World Cup. Caspar Corbeau of the Netherlands, a bronze medallist at the Paris Olympics and silver medallist at the 2024 Doha Worlds, set a lifetime best of 2:02.33 at the Singapore stop of the World Cup. Other key entrants included China’s Qin Haiyang (2:01.15 PB), Russia’s Aleksandr Zhigalov (2:01.91), and Belarus’s Ilya Shymanovich (2:01.73). Japan’s Yamato Fukasawa and Sweden’s Erik Persson also held lifetime bests under 2:03. Canada’s teenager Oliver Dawson, coming off a strong long-course season, was also among the potential finalists.

SwimSwam predicted Prigoda would win, Yong would take second, and Corbeau would take third.

== Results ==
=== Heats ===
The heats were started at 9:40.

Rank	Heat	Lane	Name	Nationality	Time	Notes
1	3	5	Yamato Fukasawa	Japan	2:02.24	Q
2	3	4	Aleksandr Zhigalov	Neutral Athletes B	2:02.46	Q
3	4	1	AJ Pouch	United States	2:03.06	Q
4	4	4	Kirill Prigoda	Neutral Athletes B	2:03.61	Q
5	5	3	Carles Coll	Spain	2:03.63	Q
6	4	5	Caspar Corbeau	Netherlands	2:03.86	Q
7	4	3	Ilya Shymanovich	Neutral Athletes A	2:04.11	Q
8	5	4	Joshua Yong	Australia	2:04.15	Q
9	5	5	Qin Haiyang	China	2:04.42	R
10	3	3	Joshua Collett	Australia	2:04.48	R
11	4	0	Jan Kałusowski	Poland	2:04.63	NR
12	4	6	Cho Sung-jae	South Korea	2:04.78	NR
13	5	0	Denis Petrashov	Kyrgyzstan	2:05.45	
14	3	2	Darius Coman	Romania	2:06.19	NR
14	5	2	Adam Chillingworth	Hong Kong	2:06.19	
16	3	6	Yu Zongda	China	2:06.24	
17	3	7	Eoin Corby	Ireland	2:06.45	NR
18	4	7	Andrius Šidlauskas	Lithuania	2:06.65	
18	5	6	Adam Mak	Hong Kong	2:06.65	
20	5	7	Berkay Ömer Öğretir	Turkey	2:07.54	
21	4	9	Oliver Dawson	Canada	2:07.61	
22	2	5	Vicente Villanueva	Chile	2:07.69	NR
23	5	8	Tsai Ruei-hong	Chinese Taipei	2:07.75	NR
24	4	2	Christopher Rothbauer	Austria	2:09.23	
25	5	1	Matthew Randle	South Africa	2:09.63	
26	3	0	Juan García	Colombia	2:09.66	
27	5	9	Einar Margeir Ágústsson	Iceland	2:09.97	
28	2	3	Jaouad Syoud	Algeria	2:10.19	
29	2	2	Emmanuel Gadson	Bahamas	2:10.49	NR
30	3	9	Maksim Manolov	Bulgaria	2:11.12	
31	2	1	Giacomo Casadei	San Marino	2:11.91	NR
32	2	6	Amro Al-Wir	Jordan	2:12.03	NR
33	3	8	Louis Droupy	Switzerland	2:12.78	
34	2	4	Daniils Bobrovs	Latvia	2:13.00	
35	3	1	Constantin Malachi	Moldova	2:13.20	
36	2	8	Jacob Story	Cook Islands	2:14.33	
37	2	9	Steven Insixiengmay	Laos	2:14.37	
38	1	5	Alexandros Grigoriou	Cyprus	2:14.40	NR
39	1	3	Mohammed Al-Otaibi	Saudi Arabia	2:16.10	
40	2	0	Saud Ghali	Brunei	2:17.16	
41	2	7	Jonathan Raharvel	Madagascar	2:18.13	
42	1	4	Kouki Cerezo Watanabe	Northern Mariana Islands	2:25.70	

=== Final ===
The final was held at 17:50. Spain's Carles Coll won the event with a new national record of 2:01.55. He became the first Spanish man to win a world short course title in an individual event. Upon winning the event, he said "I wish (Léon) Marchand was here, he’s really really fast. I would have loved to race with him." SwimSwam called Coll's victory a "surprise".

Rank	Lane	Name	Nationality	Time	Notes
1st place, gold medalist(s)	2	Carles Coll	Spain	2:01.55	NR
2nd place, silver medalist(s)	6	Kirill Prigoda	Neutral Athletes B	2:01.88	
3rd place, bronze medalist(s)	4	Yamato Fukasawa	Japan	2:02.01	
4	5	Aleksandr Zhigalov	Neutral Athletes B	2:02.12	
5	7	Caspar Corbeau	Netherlands	2:02.44	
6	3	AJ Pouch	United States	2:02.84	
7	8	Joshua Yong	Australia	2:03.21	
8	1	Ilya Shymanovich	Neutral Athletes A	2:03.49	
