= Swimming at the 2024 Summer Olympics – Men's 100-metre breaststroke =

Men's 100 metre breaststroke at the Games of the XXXIII Olympiad
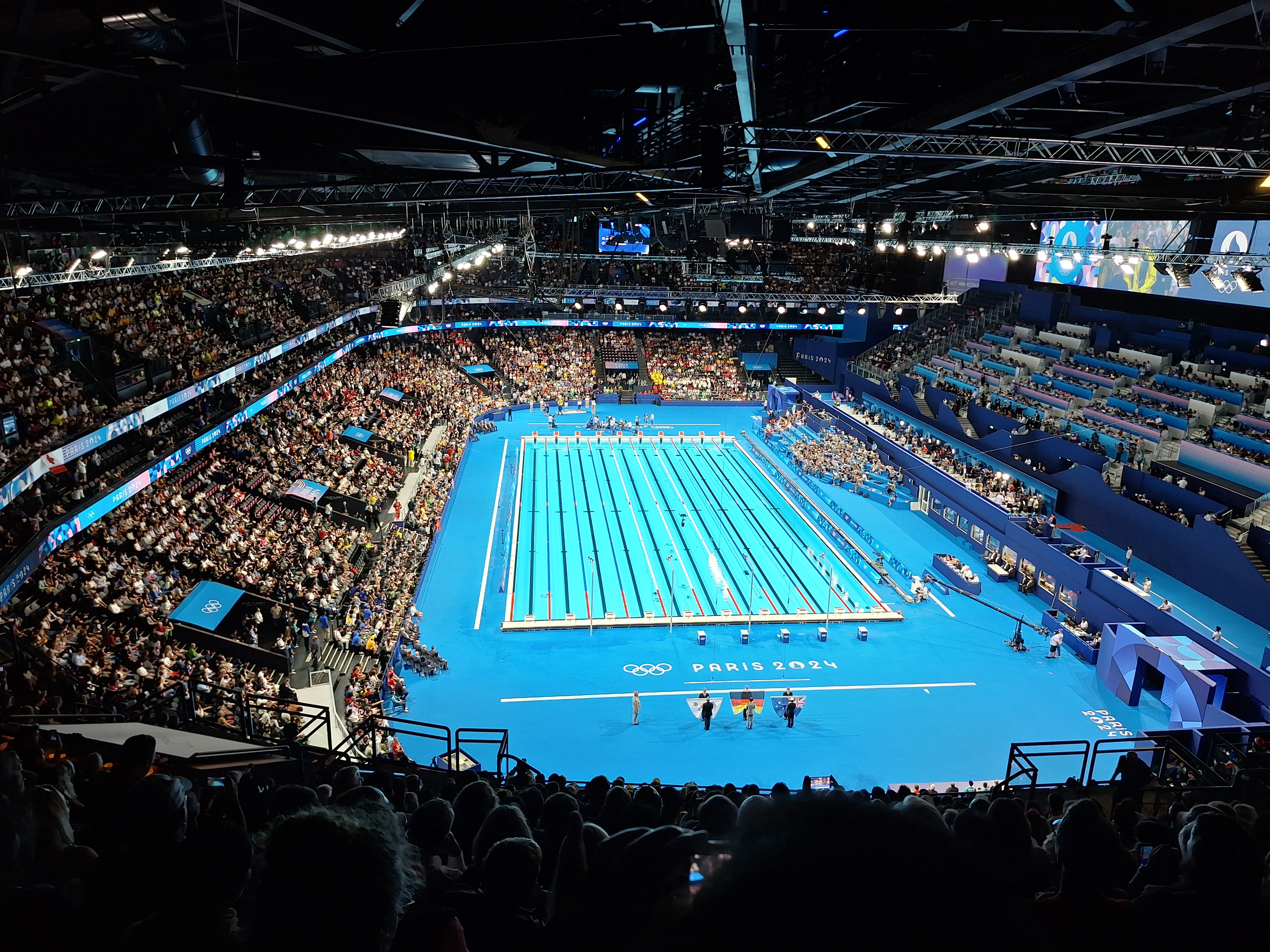
- Paris La Défense Arena after it was converted to a swimming pool for the swimming events
- Venue: Paris La Défense Arena
- Dates: 27 July 2024 (heats and semifinals); 28 July 2024 (final)
- Competitors: 36 from 28 nations
- Winning time: 59.03

Medalists
| 1st place, gold medalist(s) | | Nicolò Martinenghi | Italy |
| 2nd place, silver medalist(s) | | Adam Peaty | Great Britain |
| 2nd place, silver medalist(s) | | Nic Fink | United States |

The men's 100 metre breaststroke event at the 2024 Summer Olympics was held from 27 to 28 July 2024 at Paris La Défense Arena, which was converted to a swimming pool for the swimming events.

Great Britain's Adam Peaty and China's Qin Haiyang were the favourites going into the event, with other competitors including Italian Nicolò Martinenghi, Arno Kamminga of the Netherlands and Nic Fink of the United States. All of these swimmers progressed through to the final.

In the heats, Israel's Ron Polonsky lowered his country's national record to 1:00.00. In the semifinals Germany's Melvin Imoudu and Italy's Ludovico Viberti tied for the eighth fastest time, meaning they competed in a swim-off to determine who would progress to the final. Imoudu won the swim-off and so qualified for the final.

In the final, Qin led at halfway, but in what SwimSwam called a "frantic frenzy to the wall" Martinenghi finished first with a time of 59.03, 0.02 seconds ahead of Peaty and Fink who tied for silver with 59.05. Peaty's silver made him the first swimmer to win three Olympic medals in the event. A day after the race he tested positive for COVID-19, and shortly after that he announced his break from competitive swimming, saying "it’s just hurt too much this time".

== Background ==
Defending Olympic champion Peaty had taken a break from swimming and suffered a broken foot since his win at the 2020 Olympics. Nonetheless, he won bronze at the 2024 World Championships and registered the second fastest Olympic qualifying time of 57.94 at the 2024 British National Championships. China's Qin Haiyang had the fastest qualifying time of 57.69, which won him the gold medal at the 2023 World Championships.

Other competitors included Italian Nicolò Martinenghi, who won bronze at the previous Olympics and won gold at the 2022 World Championships; Arno Kamminga of the Netherlands, who won silver at the previous Olympics; and Nic Fink of the United States, who won the event at the 2022 World Short Course Championships and at the 2024 World Championships. Martinenghi, Kamminga and Fink all tied for silver at the 2023 World Championships.

Both SwimSwam and Swimming World predicted Qin would win gold and Peaty would take second. SwimSwam predicted Fink would take third, while Swimming World predicted it would be Martinenghi.

Prior to the event, the world and Olympic records were held by Adam Peaty of Great Britain, with times of 56.88 (2019) and 57.13 (2016), respectively.

The event was held at Paris La Défense Arena, which was converted to a swimming pool for the swimming events.

== Qualification ==
Each National Olympic Committee (NOC) was permitted to enter a maximum of two qualified athletes in each individual event, but only if both of them had attained the Olympic Qualifying Time (OQT). For this event, the OQT was 59.49 seconds. World Aquatics then considered athletes qualifying through universality; NOCs were given one event entry for each gender, which could be used by any athlete regardless of qualification time, providing the spaces had not already been taken by athletes from that nation who had achieved the OQT. Finally, the rest of the spaces were filled by athletes who had met the Olympic Consideration Time (OCT), which was 59.79 for this event. In total, 21 athletes qualified through achieving the OQT, 15 athletes qualified through universality places and two athletes qualified through achieving the OCT.

Top 10 fastest qualification times
| Swimmer | Country | Time | Competition |
|---|---|---|---|
| Qin Haiyang | China | 57.69 | 2023 World Aquatics Championships |
| Adam Peaty | Great Britain | 57.94 | 2024 Aquatics GB Swimming Championships |
| Nic Fink | United States | 58.36 | 2023 United States National Championships |
| Arno Kamminga | Netherlands | 58.68 | 2023 World Aquatics World Cup |
| Nicolò Martinenghi | Italy | 58.72 | 2023 World Aquatics Championships |
| Evgenii Somov | Individual Neutral Athletes | 58.72 | 2024 Atlanta Classic |
| Sun Jiajun | China | 58.73 | 2024 Chinese Championships |
| Lucas Matzerath | Germany | 58.74 | 2023 World Aquatics Championships |
| Sam Williamson | Australia | 58.80 | 2024 Australian Olympic Trials |
| Melvin Imoudu | Germany | 59.07 | 2024 Eindhoven Qualification Meet |

== Heats ==
The event was held at Paris La Défense Arena, which was converted to a swimming pool for the swimming events. Five heats (preliminary rounds) took place on 27 July 2024, starting at 11:00. (Note: All times are Central European Summer Time (UTC+2)) The swimmers with the best 16 times in the heats advanced to the semifinals. The Netherlands' Caspar Corbeau won the third heat to qualify with the fastest time of 59.04. Peaty qualified second with 59.18, while Martinenghi, Kamminga, Qin and Fink also qualified. Israel's Ron Polonsky qualified for the semifinal with a new national record of 1:00.00, which beat his previous national record of 1:00.07.

Results
| Rank | Heat | Lane | Swimmer | Nation | Time | Notes |
|---|---|---|---|---|---|---|
| 1 | 3 | 6 | Caspar Corbeau | Netherlands | 59.04 | Q |
| 2 | 4 | 4 | Adam Peaty | Great Britain | 59.18 | Q |
| 3 | 4 | 7 | Ilya Shymanovich | Individual Neutral Athletes | 59.25 | Q |
| 4 | 4 | 5 | Nicolò Martinenghi | Italy | 59.39 | Q |
| 4 | 5 | 5 | Arno Kamminga | Netherlands | 59.39 | Q |
| 6 | 4 | 1 | James Wilby | Great Britain | 59.40 | Q |
| 7 | 5 | 6 | Melvin Imoudu | Germany | 59.49 | Q |
| 8 | 4 | 3 | Lucas Matzerath | Germany | 59.52 | Q |
| 9 | 5 | 4 | Qin Haiyang | China | 59.58 | Q |
| 10 | 3 | 4 | Nic Fink | United States | 59.66 | Q |
| 11 | 4 | 8 | Bernhard Reitshammer | Austria | 59.68 | Q |
| 12 | 3 | 1 | Joshua Yong | Australia | 59.75 | Q |
| 13 | 3 | 5 | Evgenii Somov | Individual Neutral Athletes | 59.83 | Q |
| 14 | 4 | 6 | Charlie Swanson | United States | 59.92 | Q |
| 15 | 3 | 2 | Ludovico Blu Art Viberti | Italy | 59.93 | Q |
| 16 | 3 | 8 | Ron Polonsky | Israel | 1:00.00 | Q, NR |
| 17 | 5 | 3 | Sun Jiajun | China | 1:00.11 | |
| 18 | 5 | 7 | Choi Dong-yeol | South Korea | 1:00.17 | |
| 19 | 3 | 7 | Taku Taniguchi | Japan | 1:00.20 | |
| 20 | 4 | 2 | Andrius Šidlauskas | Lithuania | 1:00.29 | |
| 21 | 5 | 2 | Berkay Ömer Öğretir | Turkey | 1:00.36 | |
| 22 | 5 | 8 | Jan Kałusowski | Poland | 1:00.40 | |
| 23 | 5 | 1 | Denis Petrashov | Kyrgyzstan | 1:00.42 | |
| 24 | 3 | 3 | Sam Williamson | Australia | 1:00.50 | |
| 25 | 2 | 5 | Anton McKee | Iceland | 1:00.62 | |
| 26 | 2 | 6 | Jadon Wuilliez | Antigua and Barbuda | 1:02.70 | |
| 27 | 2 | 2 | Adrian Robinson | Botswana | 1:02.79 | |
| 28 | 2 | 3 | Alexandre Grand'Pierre | Haiti | 1:02.85 | |
| 29 | 2 | 1 | Tasi Limtiaco | Federated States of Micronesia | 1:04.14 | |
| 30 | 2 | 8 | Abdulaziz Al-Obaidly | Qatar | 1:04.31 | |
| 31 | 1 | 4 | Steven Insixiengmay | Laos | 1:04.64 | |
| 32 | 1 | 3 | Matthew Lawrence | Mozambique | 1:04.95 | |
| 33 | 2 | 7 | Jonathan Raharvel | Madagascar | 1:05.20 | |
| 34 | 1 | 5 | Micah Masei | American Samoa | 1:05.95 | |
| 35 | 1 | 6 | Chadd Ning | Eswatini | 1:09.85 | |
| | 2 | 4 | Miguel de Lara | Mexico | DSQ | |

== Semifinals ==
Two semifinals took place on 27 July, starting at 21:12. The swimmers with the best eight times in the semifinals advanced to the final. Peaty won the first semifinal to qualify for the final with the fastest time of 58.86, while Qin won the second semifinal to qualify with the second fastest time of 58.93. Kamminga, Fink, Corbeau, Martinenghi and Lucas Metzerath of Germany also qualified. Germany's Melvin Imoudu and Italy's Ludovico Viberti tied for the eighth fastest time as they both swam 59.38, which meant they raced in a swim-off to determine who reached the final.

Results
| Rank | Heat | Lane | Swimmer | Nation | Time | Notes |
|---|---|---|---|---|---|---|
| 1 | 1 | 4 | Adam Peaty | Great Britain | 58.86 | Q |
| 2 | 2 | 2 | Qin Haiyang | China | 58.93 | Q |
| 3 | 2 | 3 | Arno Kamminga | Netherlands | 59.12 | Q |
| 4 | 1 | 2 | Nic Fink | United States | 59.16 | Q |
| 5 | 2 | 4 | Caspar Corbeau | Netherlands | 59.24 | Q |
| 6 | 1 | 5 | Nicolò Martinenghi | Italy | 59.28 | Q |
| 7 | 1 | 6 | Lucas Matzerath | Germany | 59.31 | Q |
| 8 | 2 | 6 | Melvin Imoudu | Germany | 59.38 | QSO |
| 8 | 2 | 8 | Ludovico Blu Art Viberti | Italy | 59.38 | QSO |
| 10 | 2 | 5 | Ilya Shymanovich | Individual Neutral Athletes | 59.45 | |
| 11 | 1 | 3 | James Wilby | Great Britain | 59.49 | |
| 12 | 1 | 7 | Joshua Yong | Australia | 59.64 | |
| 13 | 2 | 1 | Evgenii Somov | Individual Neutral Athletes | 1:00.00 | |
| 14 | 1 | 1 | Charlie Swanson | United States | 1:00.16 | |
| 15 | 2 | 7 | Bernhard Reitshammer | Austria | 1:00.18 | |
| 16 | 1 | 8 | Ron Polonsky | Israel | 1:00.37 | |

=== Swim-off ===
The swim-off took place at 22:24 on 27 July. Imoudu won with a time of 59.69 to Viberti's 59.90, so Imoudu qualified for the final.

Results
| Rank | Lane | Swimmer | Nation | Time | Notes |
|---|---|---|---|---|---|
| 1 | 4 | Melvin Imoudu | Germany | 59.69 | Q |
| 2 | 5 | Ludovico Blu Art Viberti | Italy | 59.90 | |

== Final ==
The final took place at 21:44 on 28 July. Qin led at the halfway (50 metre) mark, followed by Peaty and then Martinenghi. Over the rest of the race, Martinenghi moved up to first to win the gold with 59.03. Fink, who was fifth at the 50 metre mark, moved up to second and tied with Peaty for the silver medal, both clocking 59.05. Imoudu finished fourth with 59.11, while Qin dropped to seventh by the end of the race. SwimSwam called the finish of the race a "frantic frenzy to the wall", since the first six swimmers finished within 0.29 seconds of each other.

Peaty's silver made him the first swimmer to win three Olympic medals in the event, while it was Martinenghi's second medal in the event. In his post race interview, Martinenghi said winning the gold was "probably the best feeling of [his] life". In Peaty's post race interview, he cried and said "I’m not crying because I’ve come second. I’m crying because it took so much to get here." A day after the race he tested positive for COVID-19, and shortly after that he announced his break from competitive swimming, saying "it’s just hurt too much this time".

The winning time of 59.03 was almost two seconds slower than the winning time at the previous Olympics, which induced discussion over whether the Paris Olympic pool was "slow". The time was slower than the winning time in the event at every Olympics since 2004.

Results
| Rank | Lane | Swimmer | Nation | Time | Notes |
|---|---|---|---|---|---|
| 1st place, gold medalist(s) | 7 | Nicolò Martinenghi | Italy | 59.03 | |
| 2nd place, silver medalist(s) | 4 | Adam Peaty | Great Britain | 59.05 | |
| 2nd place, silver medalist(s) | 6 | Nic Fink | United States | 59.05 | |
| 4 | 8 | Melvin Imoudu | Germany | 59.11 | |
| 5 | 1 | Lucas Matzerath | Germany | 59.30 | |
| 6 | 3 | Arno Kamminga | Netherlands | 59.32 | |
| 7 | 5 | Qin Haiyang | China | 59.50 | |
| 8 | 2 | Caspar Corbeau | Netherlands | 59.98 | |

Statistics
| Name | 15 metre split (s) | 50 metre split (s) | 50–65 metre split (s) | Time (s) | Stroke rate (strokes/min) |
|---|---|---|---|---|---|
| Nicolò Martinenghi | 6.22 | 27.34 | 8.78 | 59.03 | 55.8 |
| Adam Peaty | 6.40 | 27.08 | 9.04 | 59.05 | 55.6 |
| Nic Fink | 5.96 | 27.45 | 8.85 | 59.05 | 49.4 |
| Melvin Imoudu | 6.46 | 27.37 | 9.27 | 59.11 | 49.7 |
| Lucas Matzerath | 6.48 | 27.56 | 8.94 | 59.30 | 55.7 |
| Arno Kamminga | 6.43 | 27.94 | 8.80 | 59.32 | 46.2 |
| Qin Haiyang | 6.14 | 27.03 | 9.23 | 59.50 | 53.0 |
| Caspar Corbeau | 6.18 | 27.91 | 8.78 | 59.98 | 45.3 |
