= 2024 World Aquatics Swimming Championships (25 m) – Men's 100 metre breaststroke =

Swimming competition

Men's 100 metre breaststroke at the 2024 World Aquatics Swimming Championships (25 m)
- Venue: Duna Arena
- Location: Budapest, Hungary
- Dates: 11 December (heats and semifinals); 12 December (final)
- Competitors: 74 from 67 nations
- Winning time: 55.47

Medalists
gold medal	Qin Haiyang	China
silver medal	Kirill Prigoda
bronze medal	Ilya Shymanovich

The Men's 100 metre breaststroke competition of the 2024 World Aquatics Swimming Championships (25 m) was held on 11 and 12 December 2024.

== Records ==
Prior to the competition, the existing world and championship records were as follows:

World record	Ilya Shymanovich (BLR)	55.28	Eindhoven, Netherlands	26 November 2021
Competition record	Ilya Shymanovich (BLR)	55.70	Abu Dhabi, United Arab Emirates	17 December 2021

The following record was established during the competition:

Date	Event	Name	Nationality	Time	Record
12 December	Final	Qin Haiyang	China	55.47	CR

== Background ==
Qin Haiyang of China had the fastest qualifying time with an Asian record of 55.61, set at the Singapore leg of the 2024 World Cup. He was tied for fourth all-time in the event. The only swimmer ranked above him in the all-time standings competing in Budapest was world record holder Ilya Shymanovich of Belarus (competing as a Neutral Athlete at this competition), who set his mark at 55.28 in 2021. Shymanovich outperformed Qin at the Incheon stop of the World Cup, though his season best of 55.72 also came in Singapore. Kirill Prigoda, competing as a neutral athlete from Russia, was the only other swimmer under 56 seconds so far in the season, having recorded a lifetime best of 55.95. Emre Sakçı of Turkey, a past sub-56 swimmer, entered with a slower season best of 59.53. Simone Cerasuolo of Italy had recently swam a personal best of 56.28, while Germany’s Lucas Matzerath had a lifetime best of 57.04. Japan’s Taku Taniguchi posted a 56.27 at nationals. Caspar Corbeau of the Netherlands and Australia’s Joshua Yong recorded lifetime bests of 56.59 and 56.66 respectively. Aleksandr Zhigalov, also from Russia and competing as a neutral athlete, swam 56.58. Other entrants included Caio Pumputis of Brazil, Bernhard Reitshammer of Austria, Michael Andrew of the United States, Denis Petrashov of Kyrgyzstan, and Finlay Knox of Canada.

SwimSwam predicted Shymanovich would win, Haiyang would take second, and Prigoda would take third.

== Results ==
=== Heats ===
The heats were started on 11 December at 10:13.

Rank	Heat	Lane	Name	Nationality	Time	Notes
1	6	4	Kirill Prigoda	Neutral Athletes B	55.82	Q, NR
2	8	4	Qin Haiyang	China	56.39	Q
3	8	5	Taku Taniguchi	Japan	56.59	Q
4	5	5	Denis Petrashov	Kyrgyzstan	56.65	Q, NR
4	7	4	Ilya Shymanovich	Neutral Athletes A	56.65	Q
6	8	3	Caspar Corbeau	Netherlands	56.71	Q
7	7	6	Ludovico Viberti	Italy	56.86	Q
8	6	5	Aleksandr Zhigalov	Neutral Athletes B	56.90	Q
9	7	3	Joshua Yong	Australia	56.99	Q
10	6	6	Carles Coll	Spain	57.07	Q, NR
11	5	6	Jan Kałusowski	Poland	57.23	Q, NR
11	7	5	Simone Cerasuolo	Italy	57.23	Q
13	7	2	Yamato Fukasawa	Japan	57.26	Q
14	8	6	Choi Dong-yeol	South Korea	57.29	Q, NR
15	8	2	Bernhard Reitshammer	Austria	57.34	Q
16	8	0	Chris Smith	South Africa	57.38	Q
17	6	3	Emre Sakçı	Turkey	57.39	R
18	8	9	Melvin Imoudu	Germany	57.44	R
19	5	3	Michael Andrew	United States	57.57	
20	6	7	Caio Pumputis	Brazil	57.60	
21	6	0	Lucas Matzerath	Germany	57.61	
22	7	7	Koen de Groot	Netherlands	57.65	
23	8	8	Daniel Kertes	Sweden	57.71	
24	8	1	Archie Goodburn	Great Britain	57.81	
25	6	9	Andrius Šidlauskas	Lithuania	57.88	
26	5	9	Finlay Knox	Canada	57.90	
27	6	2	Joshua Collett	Australia	57.94	
28	7	1	Volodymyr Lisovets	Ukraine	58.13	
29	8	7	Berkay Ömer Öğretir	Turkey	58.36	
30	4	2	Ronan Wantenaar	Namibia	58.59	NR
30	7	0	Adam Mak	Hong Kong	58.59	
32	7	8	Eoin Corby	Ireland	58.63	
33	4	3	Kristian Pitshugin	Israel	58.67	
34	6	1	Juan García	Colombia	58.73	
35	4	0	Jørgen Scheie Bråthen	Norway	58.98	
36	6	8	Snorri Dagur Einarsson	Iceland	59.01	
37	4	5	Maksim Manolov	Bulgaria	59.20	
38	3	4	Vicente Villanueva	Chile	59.22	NR
39	4	1	Louis Droupy	Switzerland	59.33	
40	4	7	Arkadios Aspougalis	Greece	59.46	
41	5	7	Ralf Roose	Estonia	59.52	
42	5	2	Dávid Horváth	Hungary	59.61	
43	7	9	Chao Man Hou	Macau	59.74	
44	4	8	Joao Carneiro	Luxembourg	59.82	
45	3	3	Amro Al-Wir	Jordan	1:00.03	NR
46	5	0	Panayiotis Panaretos	Cyprus	1:00.14	
47	1	4	Samy Boutouil	Morocco	1:00.21	NR
48	5	1	Davin Lindholm	Finland	1:00.23	
49	3	8	Steven Insixiengmay	Laos	1:00.36	
50	3	7	Emmanuel Gadson	Bahamas	1:00.42	
51	3	5	Adrian Robinson	Botswana	1:00.68	NR
52	1	5	Mohammed Alotaibi	Saudi Arabia	1:00.76	NR
53	3	2	Josué Domínguez	Dominican Republic	1:00.89	
54	5	4	Constantin Malachi	Moldova	1:01.12	
55	3	1	Jacob Story	Cook Islands	1:02.11	NR
56	4	6	Daniils Bobrovs	Latvia	1:02.14	
57	2	4	Zach Moyo	Zambia	1:02.15	NR
58	2	5	Raul Antadillas	Panama	1:02.23	
59	2	3	Haniel Kudwoli	Kenya	1:02.49	
60	4	9	Ashot Chakhoyan	Armenia	1:02.56	
61	2	6	Saud Ghali	Bahrain	1:02.93	NR
62	3	0	Luis Weekes	Barbados	1:02.96	
63	2	7	Hussaine Taha	Oman	1:03.97	
64	2	9	Mohamed Abujiba	Palestine	1:04.73	NR
65	3	9	Ganzorigtyn Sugar	Mongolia	1:05.02	
66	1	6	Kim Won-ju	North Korea	1:05.07	
67	1	3	Anas Ganedi	Libya	1:05.48	
68	2	2	Selim Nazarov	Turkmenistan	1:05.67	
69	2	1	Kouki Cerezo Watanabe	Northern Mariana Islands	1:06.66	
70	2	8	Fode Amara Camara	Guinea	1:12.95	
71	2	0	Yves Munyu Kupiata	Democratic Republic of the Congo	1:20.09	
	3	6	Giacomo Casadei	San Marino	Disqualified	
	4	4	Patrick Pelegrina	Andorra	Disqualified	
	5	8	Arsen Kozhakhmetov	Kazakhstan	Disqualified	
	1	2	Alemekezeke Chinyamu	Malawi	Did not start	

=== Semifinals ===
The semifinals were started on 11 December at 18:24.

Rank	Heat	Lane	Name	Nationality	Time	Notes
1	2	5	Kirill Prigoda	Neutral Athletes B	56.02	Q
2	1	4	Qin Haiyang	China	56.04	Q
3	2	3	Ilya Shymanovich	Neutral Athletes A	56.21	Q
4	2	2	Taku Taniguchi	Japan	56.40	Q
5	1	2	Aleksandr Zhigalov	Neutral Athletes B	56.50	Q
6	1	4	Denis Petrashov	Kyrgyzstan	56.52	Q, NR
7	1	3	Caspar Corbeau	Netherlands	56.60	Q
7	2	6	Ludovico Viberti	Italy	56.60	Q
9	2	1	Joshua Yong	Australia	56.62	R, OC
10	1	7	Carles Coll	Spain	56.67	R, NR
11	1	7	Simone Cerasuolo	Italy	56.94	
12	2	6	Jan Kałusowski	Poland	56.98	NR
13	2	5	Yamato Fukasawa	Japan	57.07	
14	1	8	Chris Smith	South Africa	57.11	
15	2	8	Bernhard Reitshammer	Austria	57.28	
16	1	1	Choi Dong-yeol	South Korea	57.30	

=== Final ===
The final was started on 12 December at 18:38.

Rank	Lane	Name	Nationality	Time	Notes
1st place, gold medalist(s)	5	Qin Haiyang	China	55.47	CR, AS
2nd place, silver medalist(s)	4	Kirill Prigoda	Neutral Athletes B	55.49	NR
3rd place, bronze medalist(s)	3	Ilya Shymanovich	Neutral Athletes A	55.60	
4	7	Denis Petrashov	Kyrgyzstan	55.91	NR
5	6	Taku Taniguchi	Japan	56.32	
6	2	Aleksandr Zhigalov	Neutral Athletes B	56.35	
7	1	Caspar Corbeau	Netherlands	56.46	
7	8	Ludovico Viberti	Italy	56.46	
