= 2022 FINA World Swimming Championships (25 m) – Men's 100 metre breaststroke =

Swimming competition

Men's 100 metre breaststroke at the 2022 FINA World Swimming Championships (25 m)
- Venue: Melbourne Sports and Aquatic Centre
- Location: Melbourne, Australia
- Dates: 14 December (heats and semifinals); 15 December (final)
- Competitors: 60 from 53 nations
- Winning time: 55.88

Medalists
gold medal	Nic Fink	United States
silver medal	Nicolò Martinenghi	Italy
bronze medal	Adam Peaty	Great Britain

The Men's 100 metre breaststroke competition of the 2022 FINA World Swimming Championships (25 m) was held on 14 and 15 December 2022.

== Records ==
Prior to the competition, the existing world and championship records were as follows.

World record	Ilya Shymanovich (BLR)	55.28	Eindhoven, Netherlands	26 November 2021
Competition record	Ilya Shymanovich (BLR)	55.70	Abu Dhabi, United Arab Emirates	17 December 2021

== Results ==
=== Heats ===
The heats were started on 14 December at 12:50.

Rank	Heat	Lane	Name	Nationality	Time	Notes
1	7	4	Nicolò Martinenghi	Italy	56.60	Q
2	6	4	Yuya Hinomoto	Japan	56.62	Q
3	7	5	Qin Haiyang	China	56.66	Q
4	7	2	Adam Peaty	Great Britain	56.81	Q
5	8	4	Nic Fink	United States	57.02	Q
6	6	3	Ippei Watanabe	Japan	57.11	Q
7	7	7	Antoine Viquerat	France	57.18	Q
8	7	1	Lucas Matzerath	Germany	57.22	Q
9	8	3	Simone Cerasuolo	Italy	57.24	Q
10	8	2	Caspar Corbeau	Netherlands	57.53	Q
11	7	3	Bernhard Reitshammer	Austria	57.66	Q
12	6	1	Carl Aitkaci	France	57.68	Q
13	8	5	Emre Sakçı	Turkey	57.70	Q
14	7	8	Joshua Yong	Australia	57.77	Q
15	7	6	Caio Pumputis	Brazil	57.78	Q
16	8	8	Matěj Zábojník	Czech Republic	57.87	Q
17	6	5	Sun Jiajun	China	57.92	
18	5	4	Chao Man Hou	Macau	58.01	NR
18	6	7	Anton McKee	Iceland	58.01	
20	6	2	Erik Persson	Sweden	58.05	
21	4	7	Josh Gilbert	New Zealand	58.06	
22	5	1	Maximillian Ang	Singapore	58.10	NR
23	8	6	Sam Williamson	Australia	58.13	
24	5	2	Denis Petrashov	Kyrgyzstan	58.21	NR
25	8	1	Michael Andrew	United States	58.22	
26	6	6	Berkay Ömer Öğretir	Turkey	58.27	
27	6	8	Peter John Stevens	Slovenia	58.31	
28	4	3	James Dergousoff	Canada	58.50	
29	3	1	Tonislav Sabev	Bulgaria	58.58	
30	8	7	Andrius Šidlauskas	Lithuania	58.60	
31	4	1	Jorge Murillo	Colombia	58.83	NR
32	4	5	Ádám Halás	Slovakia	59.12	
33	5	3	Christoffer Haarsaker	Norway	59.13	
34	4	4	Julio Horrego	Honduras	59.22	
35	4	2	Volodymyr Lisovets	Ukraine	59.55	
36	4	6	Youssef El-Kamash	Egypt	59.61	
36	4	8	Adam Chillingworth	Hong Kong	59.61	
38	5	6	Josué Domínguez	Dominican Republic	59.73	
39	5	8	Jadon Wuilliez	Netherlands Antilles	1:00.00	
40	2	3	Cai Bing-rong	Chinese Taipei	1:00.16	
41	2	6	Rashed Al-Tarmoom	Kuwait	1:00.22	NR
42	3	7	Ronan Wantenaar	Namibia	1:00.35	NR
43	3	6	Kian Keylock	South Africa	1:00.60	
44	3	5	Jonathan Cook	Philippines	1:00.87	
45	3	8	Adrian Robinson	Botswana	1:00.90	NR
46	3	4	Daniils Bobrovs	Latvia	1:01.02	
47	3	2	Alexandre Grand'Pierre	Haiti	1:01.07	NR
48	2	4	Liam O'Hara	Zimbabwe	1:01.31	NR
49	3	3	Kiran Jasinghe	Sri Lanka	1:01.60	
50	2	5	Jonathan Raharvel	Madagascar	1:01.84	
51	2	1	Brandon Schuster	Samoa	1:01.96	
52	2	2	Tasi Limtiaco	Federated States of Micronesia	1:01.98	
53	1	1	Sébastien Kouma	Mali	1:04.39	
54	2	8	Omar Al-Hammadi	United Arab Emirates	1:04.57	
55	2	7	Muhammad Isa Ahmad	Brunei	1:05.15	
56	1	3	Ahmed Al-Hasani	Iraq	1:06.77	NR
57	1	4	Bikash Kumal	Nepal	1:07.50	NR
58	1	2	Mohammed Al-Maher	Saudi Arabia	1:08.84	
59	1	5	Carel Van Melvin Irakoze	Burundi	1:10.11	
	5	5	Olli Kokko	Finland	Disqualified	
	5	7	Carles Coll	Spain	Did not start	

=== Semifinals ===
The semifinals were started on 14 December at 20:57.

Rank	Heat	Lane	Name	Nationality	Time	Notes
1	2	4	Nicolò Martinenghi	Italy	56.01	Q
2	2	3	Nic Fink	United States	56.25	Q
3	2	5	Qin Haiyang	China	56.38	Q
4	1	5	Adam Peaty	Great Britain	56.42	Q
5	2	2	Simone Cerasuolo	Italy	56.71	Q
6	1	4	Yuya Hinomoto	Japan	56.77	Q
7	1	6	Lucas Matzerath	Germany	57.04	Q
8	2	6	Antoine Viquerat	France	57.07	Q
9	1	3	Ippei Watanabe	Japan	57.27	
10	1	1	Joshua Yong	Australia	57.34	
11	2	8	Caio Pumputis	Brazil	57.59	
12	2	1	Emre Sakçı	Turkey	57.65	
13	1	2	Caspar Corbeau	Netherlands	57.73	
14	1	8	Matěj Zábojník	Czech Republic	57.94	
15	2	7	Bernhard Reitshammer	Austria	57.98	
16	1	7	Carl Aitkaci	France	58.12	

=== Final ===
The final was held on 15 December at 20:44.

Rank	Lane	Name	Nationality	Time	Notes
1st place, gold medalist(s)	5	Nic Fink	United States	55.88	
2nd place, silver medalist(s)	4	Nicolò Martinenghi	Italy	56.07	
3rd place, bronze medalist(s)	6	Adam Peaty	Great Britain	56.25	
4	3	Qin Haiyang	China	56.33	
5	8	Antoine Viquerat	France	56.98	
6	2	Simone Cerasuolo	Italy	56.99	
7	1	Lucas Matzerath	Germany	57.12	
8	7	Yuya Hinomoto	Japan	57.29	
