= 2021 FINA World Swimming Championships (25 m) – Men's 200 metre breaststroke =

Swimming competition

Men's 200 metre breaststroke at the 2021 FINA World Swimming Championships (25 m)
- Venue: Etihad Arena
- Location: Abu Dhabi, United Arab Emirates
- Dates: 18 December (heats and final)
- Competitors: 36 from 33 nations
- Winning time: 2:02.28

Medalists
gold medal	Nic Fink	United States
silver medal	Arno Kamminga	Netherlands
bronze medal	Will Licon	United States

The Men's 200 metre breaststroke competition of the 2021 FINA World Swimming Championships (25 m) was held on 18 December 2021.

== Records ==
Prior to the competition, the existing world and championship records were as follows.

World record	Kirill Prigoda (RUS)	2:00.16	Hangzhou, China	13 December 2018
Competition record	Kirill Prigoda (RUS)	2:00.16	Hangzhou, China	13 December 2018

== Results ==
=== Heats ===
The heats were started at 11:02.

Rank	Heat	Lane	Name	Nationality	Time	Notes
1	2	4	Arno Kamminga	Netherlands	2:03.17	Q
2	3	5	Erik Persson	Sweden	2:03.24	Q
3	4	5	Mikhail Dorinov	Russian Swimming Federation	2:03.87	Q
4	4	3	Will Licon	United States	2:04.06	Q
5	4	4	Marco Koch	Germany	2:04.47	Q
6	2	3	Caio Pumputis	Brazil	2:04.61	Q
7	2	5	Nic Fink	United States	2:04.72	Q
8	2	7	Qin Haiyang	China	2:04.83	Q
9	4	2	Matěj Zábojník	Czech Republic	2:04.88	
10	3	4	Ilya Shymanovich	Belarus	2:04.99	
11	3	3	Alexander Zhigalov	Russian Swimming Federation	2:05.11	
12	2	6	Christopher Rothbauer	Austria	2:05.31	
12	4	6	Fabian Schwingenschlögl	Germany	2:05.31	
14	4	7	Antoine Viquerat	France	2:06.33	
15	3	8	Lyubomir Epitropov	Bulgaria	2:06.44	NR
16	3	2	Andrius Šidlauskas	Lithuania	2:07.01	
17	2	2	Denis Petrashov	Kyrgyzstan	2:07.18	
18	3	1	Cho Sung-jae	South Korea	2:07.19	NR
19	4	9	Maksym Tkachuk	Ukraine	2:07.62	
20	3	7	Tomáš Klobučník	Slovakia	2:08.40	
21	2	9	Jonathan Cook	Philippines	2:09.40	NR
22	2	0	Phạm Thanh Bảo	Vietnam	2:09.53	
23	2	1	André Grindheim	Norway	2:11.13	
24	3	9	Youssef El-Kamash	Egypt	2:11.15	NR
25	2	8	Miguel de Lara	Mexico	2:12.18	
26	3	0	Adriel Sanes	United States Virgin Islands	2:12.71	NR
27	4	8	Michael Ng	Hong Kong	2:13.19	
28	1	4	Brandon Schuster	Samoa	2:13.75	NR
29	1	2	Liam Davis	Zimbabwe	2:15.28	
30	1	6	Arnoldo Herrera	Costa Rica	2:15.82	
31	1	5	Giacomo Casadei	San Marino	2:17.39	NR
32	1	3	Jonathan Chung Yee	Mauritius	2:17.65	
33	1	7	Alexandre Grand'Pierre	Haiti	2:18.78	NR
34	1	1	Saud Ghali	Bahrain	2:20.01	
35	1	8	Mohamed Hammad	United Arab Emirates	2:33.59	
	3	6	Berkay Ömer Öğretir	Turkey	DSQ	
	4	0	Jorge Murillo	Colombia	DNS	
	4	1	Maximillian Ang	Singapore	DNS	

=== Final ===
The final was held at 18:00.

Rank	Lane	Name	Nationality	Time	Notes
1st place, gold medalist(s)	1	Nic Fink	United States	2:02.28	
2nd place, silver medalist(s)	4	Arno Kamminga	Netherlands	2:02.42	
3rd place, bronze medalist(s)	6	Will Licon	United States	2:02.84	
4	5	Erik Persson	Sweden	2:02.91	
5	8	Qin Haiyang	China	2:03.48	
6	3	Mikhail Dorinov	Russian Swimming Federation	2:03.61	
7	2	Marco Koch	Germany	2:05.42	
8	7	Caio Pumputis	Brazil	2:06.29	
