= 2022 FINA World Swimming Championships (25 m) – Men's 200 metre breaststroke =

Swimming competition

Men's 200 metre breaststroke at the 2022 FINA World Swimming Championships (25 m)
- Venue: Melbourne Sports and Aquatic Centre
- Location: Melbourne, Australia
- Dates: 16 December (heats and final)
- Competitors: 32 from 29 nations
- Winning time: 2:00.35

Medalists
gold medal	Daiya Seto	Japan
silver medal	Nic Fink	United States
bronze medal	Qin Haiyang	China

The Men's 200 metre breaststroke competition of the 2022 FINA World Swimming Championships (25 m) was held on 16 December 2022.

== Records ==
Prior to the competition, the existing world and championship records were as follows.

World record	Kirill Prigoda (RUS)	2:00.16	Hangzhou, China	13 December 2018
Competition record	Kirill Prigoda (RUS)	2:00.16	Hangzhou, China	13 December 2018

== Results ==
=== Heats ===
The heats were started at 11:39.

Rank	Heat	Lane	Name	Nationality	Time	Notes
1	5	4	Daiya Seto	Japan	2:02.43	Q
2	5	5	Nic Fink	United States	2:02.75	Q
3	4	4	Ippei Watanabe	Japan	2:03.64	Q
4	4	5	Qin Haiyang	China	2:03.81	Q
5	3	6	Antoine Viquerat	France	2:03.93	Q, NR
6	3	4	Erik Persson	Sweden	2:04.01	Q
7	5	6	Marco Koch	Germany	2:04.08	Q
8	3	5	Caio Pumputis	Brazil	2:04.37	Q
9	4	6	Matěj Zábojník	Czech Republic	2:04.57	NR
10	5	3	Anton McKee	Iceland	2:04.99	
11	4	3	Caspar Corbeau	Netherlands	2:05.14	
12	3	3	Charlie Swanson	United States	2:05.51	
13	2	3	James Dergousoff	Canada	2:06.17	
14	4	1	Adam Chillingworth	Hong Kong	2:06.46	NR
15	4	2	Denis Petrashov	Kyrgyzstan	2:06.62	
16	5	8	David Schlicht	Australia	2:06.72	
17	5	1	Berkay Ogretir	Turkey	2:07.12	
18	1	4	Adam Peaty	Great Britain	2:07.31	
19	3	8	Maximillian Ang	Singapore	2:08.12	NR
20	4	8	Josh Gilbert	New Zealand	2:08.27	
21	5	2	Andrius Sidlauskas	Lithuania	2:08.69	
22	3	1	Christoffer Haarsaker	Norway	2:08.80	
23	2	1	Jorge Murillo	Colombia	2:08.91	
24	2	2	Kian Keylock	South Africa	2:11.20	
25	2	5	Daniils Bobrovs	Latvia	2:11.37	
26	2	8	Cai Bing-rong	Chinese Taipei	2:11.66	
27	2	7	Adriel Sanes	United States Virgin Islands	2:12.69	
28	2	4	Jonathan Cook	Philippines	2:12.91	
29	1	5	Liam Davis	Zimbabwe	2:13.99	
	1	3	Mohammed Al-Maher	Saudi Arabia	Disqualified	
	3	2	Carl Aitkaci	France	Disqualified	
	3	7	Tomáš Klobučník	Slovakia	Disqualified	
	2	6	Constantin Malachi	Moldova	Did not start	
	4	7	Carles Coll	Spain	Did not start	
	5	7	Sun Jiajun	China	Did not start	

=== Final ===
The final was held at 19:51.

Rank	Lane	Name	Nationality	Time	Notes
1st place, gold medalist(s)	4	Daiya Seto	Japan	2:00.35	AS
2nd place, silver medalist(s)	5	Nic Fink	United States	2:01.60	AM
3rd place, bronze medalist(s)	6	Qin Haiyang	China	2:02.22	
4	3	Ippei Watanabe	Japan	2:02.53	
5	7	Erik Persson	Sweden	2:03.19	
6	2	Antoine Viquerat	France	2:03.33	NR
7	1	Marco Koch	Germany	2:05.01	
	8	Caio Pumputis	Brazil	Disqualified	
