= 2021 FINA World Swimming Championships (25 m) – Men's 100 metre breaststroke =

Swimming competition

Men's 100 metre breaststroke at the 2021 FINA World Swimming Championships (25 m)
- Venue: Etihad Arena
- Location: Abu Dhabi, United Arab Emirates
- Dates: 16 December (heats and semifinals); 17 December (final)
- Competitors: 62 from 56 nations
- Winning time: 55.70 CR

Medalists
gold medal	Ilya Shymanovich	Belarus
silver medal	Nicolò Martinenghi	Italy
bronze medal	Nic Fink	United States

The Men's 100 metre breaststroke competition of the 2021 FINA World Swimming Championships (25 m) was held on 16 and 17 December 2021.

== Records ==
Prior to the competition, the existing world and championship records were as follows.

World record	Ilya Shymanovich (BLR)	55.28	Eindhoven, Netherlands	26 November 2021
Competition record	Cameron van der Burgh (RSA)	56.01	Hangzhou, China	12 December 2018

The following new records were set during this competition:

Date	Event	Name	Nation	Time	Record
17 December	Final	Ilya Shymanovich	Belarus	55.70	CR

== Results ==
=== Heats ===
The heats were started on 16 December at 11:35.

Rank	Heat	Lane	Name	Nationality	Time	Notes
1	7	5	Arno Kamminga	Netherlands	56.19	Q
2	7	4	Ilya Shymanovich	Belarus	56.20	Q
3	6	5	Nic Fink	United States	57.02	Q
4	5	5	Fabian Schwingenschlögl	Germany	57.07	Q
5	6	4	Nicolò Martinenghi	Italy	57.43	Q
6	5	1	Yan Zibei	China	57.45	Q
7	5	2	Antoine Viquerat	France	57.53	Q
8	7	7	Michael Andrew	United States	57.54	Q
9	7	3	Danil Semianinov	Russian Swimming Federation	57.66	Q
10	6	7	Matěj Zábojník	Czech Republic	57.71	Q, NR
11	6	3	Bernhard Reitshammer	Austria	57.76	Q
12	6	6	Berkay Ömer Öğretir	Turkey	57.79	Q
13	5	6	Erik Persson	Sweden	57.86	Q
14	6	0	Qin Haiyang	China	57.88	Q
15	7	0	Lucas Matzerath	Germany	58.07	Q
16	5	3	Oleg Kostin	Russian Swimming Federation	58.11	Q
17	7	2	Christopher Rothbauer	Austria	58.12	
18	7	6	Tobias Bjerg	Denmark	58.17	
19	7	9	Lyubomir Epitropov	Bulgaria	58.27	NR
20	5	7	Olli Kokko	Finland	58.31	
21	6	2	Andrius Šidlauskas	Lithuania	58.33	
22	4	5	Josué Domínguez	Dominican Republic	58.44	NR
23	7	1	Kristian Pitshugin	Israel	58.49	
24	2	2	Jadon Wuilliez	Antigua and Barbuda	58.73	NR
25	4	1	Julio Horrego	Honduras	58.80	NR
26	4	0	Youssef El-Kamash	Egypt	59.18	NR
27	6	9	Volodymyr Lisovets	Ukraine	59.25	
28	6	8	André Klippenberg Grindheim	Norway	59.26	
29	5	8	Tomáš Klobučník	Slovakia	59.35	
30	3	7	Mariano Lazzerini	Chile	59.61	NR
30	4	3	Izaak Bastian	Bahamas	59.61	NR
32	3	5	Phạm Thanh Bảo	Vietnam	1:00.05	
33	4	8	Constantin Malachi	Moldova	1:00.37	NR
34	3	2	Adriel Sanes	United States Virgin Islands	1:00.59	NR
35	4	7	Miguel de Lara	Mexico	1:00.61	
36	3	6	Sebastian Cook	Philippines	1:00.75	
37	3	4	Abobakr Abass	Sudan	1:01.15	NR
38	2	4	Kledi Kadiu	Albania	1:01.34	
38	3	1	Alexandre Grand'Pierre	Haiti	1:01.34	NR
40	4	9	Ronan Wantenaar	Namibia	1:01.36	
41	3	3	Martin Melconian	Uruguay	1:01.58	
42	4	2	Patrick Pelegrina	Andorra	1:01.99	
43	2	5	Arnoldo Herrera	Costa Rica	1:02.24	
44	3	0	Giacomo Casadei	San Marino	1:02.86	NR
45	3	9	Filipe Gomes	Malawi	1:03.21	
46	2	3	Liam Davis	Zimbabwe	1:03.29	
47	3	8	Jonathan Chung Yee	Mauritius	1:03.78	
48	2	6	Muhammad Isa Ahmad	Brunei	1:04.09	NR
49	4	6	Sébastien Kouma	Mali	1:04.16	
50	1	5	Saud Ghali	Bahrain	1:04.82	
51	2	7	Bransly Dirksz	Aruba	1:05.32	
52	2	0	Marc Dansou	Benin	1:07.33	
53	2	8	Bryson George	Saint Vincent and the Grenadines	1:07.73	
54	1	6	Ahmed Al-Hassani	Iraq	1:07.98	
55	2	1	Omar Al-Hatem	Kuwait	1:08.40	
56	1	3	Mohamed Hammad	United Arab Emirates	1:08.94	
	1	4	João Gomes Júnior	Brazil	DSQ	
	2	9	Mohamed Kamara	Sierra Leone	DSQ	
	4	4	Michael Ng	Hong Kong	DSQ	
	5	0	Cho Sung-jae	South Korea	DSQ	
	5	4	Emre Sakçı	Turkey	DSQ	
	6	1	Denis Petrashov	Kyrgyzstan	DSQ	
	5	9	Jorge Murillo	Colombia	DNS	
	7	8	Maximillian Ang	Singapore	DNS	

=== Semifinals ===
The semifinals were started on 16 December at 19:06.

Rank	Heat	Lane	Name	Nationality	Time	Notes
1	2	4	Arno Kamminga	Netherlands	56.41	Q
2	2	5	Nic Fink	United States	56.48	Q
3	1	4	Ilya Shymanovich	Belarus	56.54	Q
4	1	5	Fabian Schwingenschlögl	Germany	56.80	Q
5	2	3	Nicolò Martinenghi	Italy	56.81	Q
6	1	3	Yan Zibei	China	57.19	Q
7	1	1	Qin Haiyang	China	57.23	Q
8	1	7	Berkay Ömer Öğretir	Turkey	57.34	Q
9	2	2	Danil Semianinov	Russian Swimming Federation	57.39	
10	2	6	Antoine Viquerat	France	57.53	
11	2	8	Lucas Matzerath	Germany	57.57	
12	1	2	Matěj Zábojník	Czech Republic	57.59	NR
13	2	7	Bernhard Reitshammer	Austria	57.68	
14	1	6	Michael Andrew	United States	57.83	
15	2	1	Erik Persson	Sweden	57.86	
16	1	8	Oleg Kostin	Russian Swimming Federation	58.08	

=== Final ===
The final was held on 17 December at 18:28.

Rank	Lane	Name	Nationality	Time	Notes
1st place, gold medalist(s)	3	Ilya Shymanovich	Belarus	55.70	CR
2nd place, silver medalist(s)	2	Nicolò Martinenghi	Italy	55.80	
3rd place, bronze medalist(s)	5	Nic Fink	United States	55.87	
4	4	Arno Kamminga	Netherlands	56.06	
5	6	Fabian Schwingenschlögl	Germany	56.29	
6	1	Qin Haiyang	China	56.77	
7	7	Yan Zibei	China	56.86	
8	8	Berkay Ömer Öğretir	Turkey	57.17	
