= 2021 FINA World Swimming Championships (25 m) – Mixed 4 × 50 metre medley relay =

Swimming competition

Mixed 4 × 50 metre medley relay at the 2021 FINA World Swimming Championships (25 m)
- Venue: Etihad Arena
- Location: Abu Dhabi, United Arab Emirates
- Dates: 18 December (heats and final)
- Competitors: 158 from 36 nations
- Teams: 36
- Winning time: 1:36.20 CR

Medalists
gold medal	Kira Toussaint; Arno Kamminga; Ranomi Kromowidjojo; Thom de Boer; Tessa Giele; Nyls Korstanje; Kim Busch	Netherlands
silver medal	Shaine Casas; Nic Fink; Claire Curzan; Abbey Weitzeil; Kate Douglass; Katharine Berkoff	United States
bronze medal	Lorenzo Mora; Nicolò Martinenghi; Elena Di Liddo; Silvia Di Pietro; Michele Lamberti; Benedetta Pilato; Leonardo Deplano	Italy

The Mixed 4 × 50 metre medley relay competition of the 2021 FINA World Swimming Championships (25 m) was held on 18 December 2021.

== Records ==
Prior to the competition, the existing world and championship records were as follows.

World record	Netherlands (NED)	1:36.18	Kazan, Russia	7 November 2021
Competition record	United States (USA)	1:36.40	Hangzhou, China	13 December 2018

The following new records were set during this competition:

Date	Event	Name	Nation	Time	Record
18 December	Final	Kira Toussaint (26.21); Arno Kamminga (25.40); Ranomi Kromowidjojo (24.36); Thom de Boer (20.23)	Netherlands	1:36.20	CR

== Results ==
=== Heats ===
The heats were started at 11:18.

Rank	Heat	Lane	Nation	Swimmers	Time	Notes
1	4	3	United States	Shaine Casas (23.15); Nic Fink (25.70); Kate Douglass (24.60); Katharine Berkoff (24.29)	1:37.74	Q
2	4	4	Russian Swimming Federation	Pavel Samusenko (23.05); Andrei Nikolaev (26.33); Arina Surkova (24.94); Rozaliya Nasretdinova (23.67)	1:37.99	Q
3	5	4	Netherlands	Tessa Giele (26.52); Arno Kamminga (25.82); Nyls Korstanje (22.04); Kim Busch (24.00)	1:38.38	Q
4	3	4	Italy	Michele Lamberti (23.44); Benedetta Pilato (29.78); Silvia Di Pietro (24.99); Leonardo Deplano (20.84)	1:39.05	Q
5	4	5	France	Yohann Ndoye Brouard (23.74); Antoine Viquerat (26.18); Marie Wattel (25.31); Charlotte Bonnet (24.05)	1:39.28	Q
6	5	3	Greece	Apostolos Christou (23.27); Maria Drasidou (30.14); Anna Ntountounaki (25.55); Andreas Vazaios (21.32)	1:40.28	Q, NR
7	3	5	Finland	Ronny Brännkärr (24.18); Olli Kokko (26.14); Laura Lahtinen (26.00); Fanny Teijonsalo (23.98)	1:40.30	Q
8	5	5	Belarus	Viktar Staselovich (24.13); Alina Zmushka (30.25); Grigori Pekarski (22.29); Nastassia Karakouskaya (24.35)	1:41.02	Q
9	3	3	Turkey	Doruk Tekin (23.98); Emre Sakçı (25.23); Nida Eliz Üstündağ (27.17); Ekaterina Avramova (25.00)	1:41.38	
10	1	6	Brazil	Gabriel Fantoni (23.27); Jhennifer Conceição (29.59); Nicholas Santos (22.55); Gabrielle Roncatto (26.03)	1:41.44	
11	1	7	South Korea	Won Young-jun (23.91); Moon Jae-kwon (26.39); Park Ye-rin (26.17); Jeong So-eun (25.02)	1:41.49	NR
12	5	6	Estonia	Armin Evert Lelle (24.22); Eneli Jefimova (30.21); Daniel Zaitsev (22.57); Maria Romanjuk (25.91)	1:42.91	
13	1	3	Hong Kong	Lau Shiu Yue (24.21); Ng Yan Kin (27.81); Sze Hang Yu (26.32); Tam Hoi Lam (25.05)	1:43.39	
14	4	6	Slovakia	Ádám Halás (24.88); Tomáš Klobučník (27.17); Zora Ripková (26.49); Lillian Slušná (25.16)	1:43.70	
15	1	1	Thailand	Tonnam Kanteemool (25.22); Jenjira Srisaard (30.61); Navaphat Wongcharoen (23.81); Kornkarnjana Sapianchai (25.65)	1:45.29	NR
16	3	0	Argentina	Florencia Perotti (29.41); Martina Barbeito (30.99); Santiago Grassi (23.29); Guido Buscaglia (21.64)	1:45.33	
17	2	5	Jamaica	Keanan Dols (25.75); Alia Atkinson (29.14); Sidrell Williams (24.60); Zaneta Alvaranga (26.13)	1:45.62	
18	1	4	Luxembourg	Max Mannes (25.21); Julien Henx (27.88); Julie Meynen (27.30); Monique Olivier (25.73)	1:46.12	
19	3	2	Dominican Republic	Elizabeth Jiménez (29.36); Josué Domínguez (26.39); Krystal Lara (28.13); Denzel González (22.91)	1:46.79	
20	3	6	Andorra	Mònica Ramírez (30.04); Patrick Pelegrina (28.29); Tomàs Lomero (23.56); Nàdia Tudó (26.90)	1:48.79	NR
21	2	3	Aruba	Elisabeth Timmer (29.62); Bransly Dirksz (29.97); Mikel Schreuders (24.09); Chloe Farro (26.39)	1:50.07	
22	2	4	Netherlands Antilles	Bianca Mitchell (33.29); Jadon Wuilliez (26.68); Samantha Roberts (28.46); Stefano Mitchell (22.15)	1:50.58	
23	3	1	Senegal	Steven Aimable (25.01); Adama Niane (31.67); Oumy Diop (26.95); Jeanne Boutbien (27.32)	1:50.95	
24	5	8	Azerbaijan	Fatima Alkaramova (31.00); Rashad Alguliyev (29.94); Ramil Valizade (24.09); Mariam Sheikhalizadeh (26.04)	1:51.07	
25	2	9	Uganda	Avice Meya (31.51); Tendo Mukalazi (30.19); Jesse Ssengonzi (24.04); Kirabo Namutebi (25.93)	1:51.67	
26	2	6	Faroe Islands	Elisabeth Erlendsdóttir (29.64); Bartal Erlingsson Eidesgaard (29.21); Johan Nónskarð Dam (27.04); Alisa Bech Vestergård (26.64)	1:52.53	
27	1	5	Cayman Islands	Lauren Hew (29.64); Alison Jackson (34.45); Liam Henry (24.82); Richard Allison (23.63)	1:52.54	
28	3	8	Mongolia	Khuyagbaataryn Enkhzul (30.37); Batbayaryn Enkhtamir (30.06); Batmönkhiin Jürmed (25.83); Batbayaryn Enkhkhüslen (26.52)	1:52.78	
29	3	9	Angola	Catarina Sousa (30.27); Salvador Gordo (30.32); Lia Lima (28.91); Henrique Mascarenhas (23.34)	1:52.84	NR
30	5	2	Armenia	Ani Poghosyan (32.47); Varsenik Manucharyan (34.37); Artur Barseghyan (23.13); Vladimir Mamikonyan (23.09)	1:53.06	
31	4	7	Saint Lucia	Terrel Monplaisir (28.31); Naima Hazell (33.67); Jayhan Odlum-Smith (24.25); Mikaili Charlemagne (27.01)	1:53.24	
32	4	0	Seychelles	Aaliyah Palestrini (30.41); Simon Bachmann (29.40); Mathieu Bachmann (25.48); Khema Elizabeth (28.39)	1:53.68	
33	2	1	Mauritius	Gregory Anodin (27.23); Jonathan Chung Yee (29.66); Alicia Kok Shun (30.99); Tessa Ip Hen Cheung (26.92)	1:54.80	
34	2	2	Malawi	Ammara Pinto (32.60); Filipe Gomes (28.33); Muhammad Moosa (31.31); Jessica Makwenda (29.01)	2:01.25	
35	2	0	Maldives	Hamna Ahmed (33.95); Mohamed Aan Hussain (34.39); Ali Imaan (27.30); Aishath Sausan (30.33)	2:05.97	
	5	7	Switzerland	Roman Mityukov (24.42); Lisa Mamié (30.52); Noè Ponti; Alexandra Touretski	DSQ	
	1	2	Guam		DNS	
	2	7	Cape Verde		DNS	
	2	8	Nigeria		DNS	
	3	7	Tanzania		DNS	
	4	1	Turks and Caicos Islands		DNS	
	4	2	Albania		DNS	
	4	8	Peru		DNS	
	4	9	Northern Mariana Islands		DNS	
	5	0	Mexico		DNS	
	5	1	North Macedonia		DNS	
	5	9	Zimbabwe		DNS	

=== Final ===
The final was held at 19:55.

Rank	Lane	Nation	Swimmers	Time	Notes
1st place, gold medalist(s)	3	Netherlands	Kira Toussaint (26.21); Arno Kamminga (25.40); Ranomi Kromowidjojo (24.36); Thom de Boer (20.23)	1:36.20	CR
2nd place, silver medalist(s)	4	United States	Shaine Casas (23.16); Nic Fink (25.82); Claire Curzan (24.85); Abbey Weitzeil (23.21)	1:37.04	
3rd place, bronze medalist(s)	6	Italy	Lorenzo Mora (23.28); Nicolò Martinenghi (25.60); Elena Di Liddo (24.91); Silvia Di Pietro (23.50)	1:37.29	
4	5	Russian Swimming Federation	Pavel Samusenko (22.95); Kirill Strelnikov (26.02); Arina Surkova (25.14); Maria Kameneva (23.33)	1:37.44	
5	8	Belarus	Grigori Pekarski (23.59); Ilya Shymanovich (24.93); Anastasiya Shkurdai (25.23); Nastassia Karakouskaya (24.22)	1:37.97	
6	2	France	Mewen Tomac (23.37); Antoine Viquerat (25.96); Béryl Gastaldello (25.17); Marie Wattel (23.78)	1:38.28	
7	7	Greece	Apostolos Christou (23.34); Maria Drasidou (30.04); Anna Ntountounaki (25.01); Andreas Vazaios (21.12)	1:39.51	NR
8	1	Finland	Ronny Brännkärr (24.05); Olli Kokko (26.05); Laura Lahtinen (25.88); Fanny Teijonsalo (24.48)	1:40.46	
