= Swimming at the 2026 European Aquatics Championships – Men's 200 metre breaststroke =

Men's 200 metre breaststroke at the 2026 European Aquatics Championships
- Venue: Paris Aquatic Centre
- Dates: 12 August (heats and semifinals); 13 August (final)
- Competitors: 45 from 26 nations
- Winning time: 2:07.70

Medalists
gold medal	Filip Nowacki	Great Britain
silver medal	Caspar Corbeau	France
bronze medal	Luka Mladenovic	Austria

The Men's 200 metre breaststroke competition of the 2026 European Aquatics Championships was held on 12 and 13 August 2026.

== Records ==
Prior to the competition, the existing world, European and championship records were as follows.

	Name	Nationality	Time	Location	Date
World record	Qin Haiyang	China	2:05.48	Fukuoka	28 July 2023
European record	Leon Marchand	France	2:05.85	Paris	31 August 2024
Championship record	Anton Chupkov	Russia	2:06.80	Glasgow	6 August 2018

== Results ==
=== Heats ===
The heats were started on 12 August at 10:10.
Qualification Rules: The 16 fastest from the heats qualify to the semifinals.

Ranks	Heats	Lane	Swimmer	Country	Time	Notes
1	3	4	Kirill Prigoda	Neutral Athletes B	2:09.33	Q
2	5	4	Filip Nowacki	Great Britain	2:09.47	Q
3	4	4	Caspar Corbeau	Netherlands	2:09.66	Q
4	5	5	Aleksandr Zhigalov	Neutral Athletes B	2:09.84	Q
5	5	6	Jack Kelly	Ireland	2:10.14	Q
6	4	3	Daniil Pisetskii	Neutral Athletes B	2:10.29	
7	5	3	Gregory Butler	Great Britain	2:10.44	Q
8	4	6	Luka Mladenovic	Austria	2:10.53	Q
9	4	5	Christian Mantegazza	Italy	2:10.69	Q
10	5	7	Eoin Corby	Ireland	2:10.85	Q
11	4	0	Matti Mattsson	Finland	2:11.10	Q
12	3	5	Doruk Yoğurtcuoğlu	Turkey	2:11.20	Q
13	3	2	Aleksas Savickas	Lithuania	2:11.21	Q
14	3	7	Lucas Matzerath	Germany	2:11.22	Q
15	5	2	Jan Kałusowski	Poland	2:11.39	Q
16	4	7	Dawid Wiekiera	Poland	2:11.40	Q
17	5	8	Filip Mujan	Croatia	2:11.45	Q
18	2	5	Charlie Egeland	Norway	2:11.67	
19	4	1	Maksym Ovchinnikov	Ukraine	2:11.74	
20	3	3	Mikhail Dorinov	Neutral Athletes B	2:11.99	
21	4	9	Matei State	Romania	2:12.04	
22	3	8	Mathis Schonung	Germany	2:12.27	
23	3	1	Nil Cadevall	Spain	2:12.34	
24	3	6	Noah De Schryver	Belgium	2:12.35	
25	5	0	Darius Coman	Romania	2:12.61	
26	5	9	Jan Malte Grafe	Germany	2:12.98	
27	2	4	Sam Bengtsson Nimander	Sweden	2:13.69	
28	5	1	Evangelos Ntoumas	Greece	2:13.74	
29	3	0	Daniel Rumenov Marinov	Norway	2:13.92	
30	4	2	Kerem İlyem	Turkey	2:14.30	
31	2	2	Oliver Munn	Sweden	2:15.15	
32	2	7	Einar Margeir Ágústsson	Iceland	2:15.16	
33	3	9	Finn Kemp	Luxembourg	2:15.51	
34	4	8	Marios Zafeiropoulos	Greece	2:15.75	
35	2	1	Jami Ihalainen	Finland	2:16.06	
36	2	9	Christopher Palvadre	Estonia	2:16.54	
37	2	6	Gian-Luca Gartmann	Switzerland	2:17.07	
38	2	8	Noah Zemansky	Austria	2:17.16	
39	1	6	Laurin Korber-Perner	Austria	2:18.43	
40	1	3	Joao Soares Carneiro	Luxembourg	2:20.14	
41	1	4	Ralf Roose	Estonia	2:20.29	
42	1	2	Elias Marius Elsgaard	Denmark	2:20.68	
43	2	3	Constantin Malachi	Moldova	2:20.98	
44	1	5	Strahinja Maslo	Serbia	2:21.23	
45	2	0	Denis Svet	Moldova	2:23.76	

=== Semifinals ===
The semifinals were started on 12 August at 19:04.
Qualification Rules: The fastest 8 qualified competitors from the semi-finals advance to the final.

Rank	Heat	Lane	Swimmer	Nation	Time	Notes
1	1	4	Filip Nowacki	Great Britain	2:08.60	Q
2	2	6	Luka Mladenovic	Austria	2:08.85	Q, NR
3	2	5	Caspar Corbeau	Netherlands	2:09.00	Q
4	2	4	Kirill Prigoda	Neutral Athletes B	2:09.17	Q
5	2	3	Jack Kelly	Ireland	2:09.23	Q, NR
6	1	3	Gregory Butler	Great Britain	2:09.37	Q
7	1	6	Christian Mantegazza	Italy	2:09.87	Q
8	2	1	Lucas Matzerath	Germany	2:10.07	Q
9	1	2	Matti Mattsson	Finland	2:10.12	
10	1	5	Aleksandr Zhigalov	Neutral Athletes B	2:10.19	
11	2	2	Eoin Corby	Ireland	2:10.27	
12	2	7	Doruk Yoğurtcuoğlu	Turkey	2:10.37	
13	1	7	Aleksas Savickas	Lithuania	2:10.90	
14	2	8	Dawid Wiekiera	Poland	2:10.97	
15	1	8	Filip Mujan	Croatia	2:11.71	
16	1	1	Jan Kałusowski	Poland	2:12.32	

=== Final ===
The final was held on 13 August at 19:29.

Rank	Lane	Swimmer	Nation	Time	Notes
1st place, gold medalist(s)	4	Filip Nowacki	Great Britain	2:07.70	
2nd place, silver medalist(s)	3	Caspar Corbeau	Netherlands	2:07.78	
3rd place, bronze medalist(s)	5	Luka Mladenovic	Austria	2:08.91	
4	6	Kirill Prigoda	Neutral Athletes B	2:09.14	
5	7	Gregory Butler	Great Britain	2:09.45	
6	1	Christian Mantegazza	Italy	2:09.83	
7	2	Jack Kelly	Ireland	2:10.58	
8	8	Lucas Matzerath	Germany	2:10.67	
