= Nic Fink =

American swimmer (born 1993)

Nicolas Fink
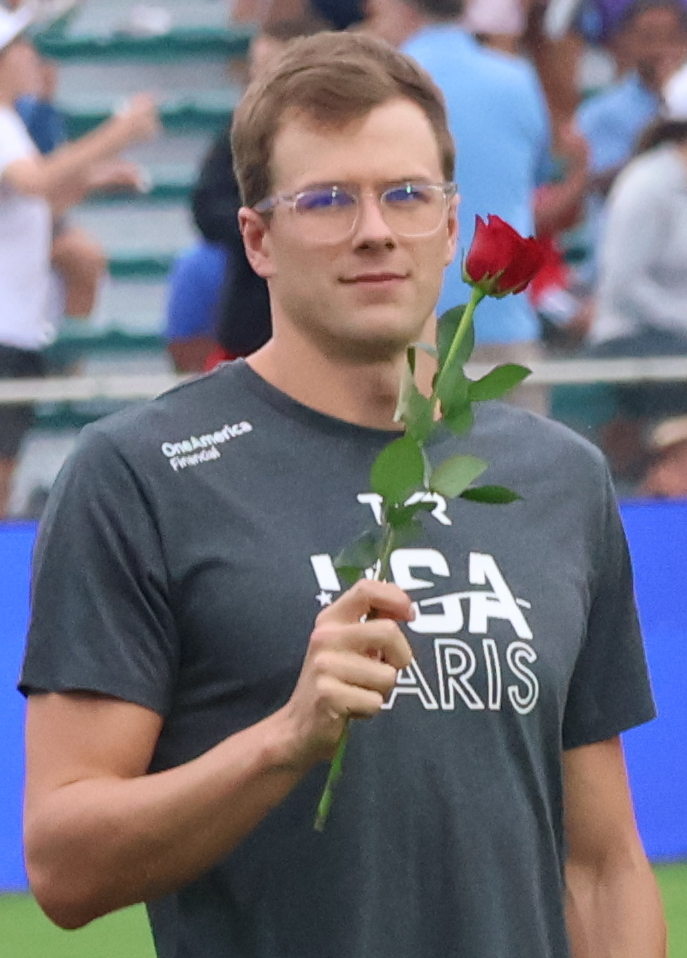
- Fink in 2024

Personal information
- Full name: Nicolas Fink
- National team: United States
- Born: July 3, 1993 (age 33) Houston, Texas, U.S.
- Home town: Morristown, New Jersey, U.S.
- Height: 6 ft 3 in (191 cm)
- Weight: 194 lb (88 kg)

Sport
- Sport: Swimming
- Strokes: Breaststroke
- Club: Cali Condors; Athens Bulldog Swim Club
- College team: University of Georgia
- Coach: Jack Bauerle
Medal record
Men's swimming
Representing United States
Olympic Games
Gold medal – first place	2024 Paris	4×100 m mixed medley
Silver medal – second place	2024 Paris	100 m breaststroke
Silver medal – second place	2024 Paris	4x100 m medley
World Championships (LC)
Gold medal – first place	2022 Budapest	50 m breaststroke
Gold medal – first place	2022 Budapest	4×100 m mixed medley
Gold medal – first place	2023 Fukuoka	4x100 m medley
Gold medal – first place	2024 Doha	100 m breaststroke
Gold medal – first place	2024 Doha	4×100 m medley
Gold medal – first place	2024 Doha	4×100 m mixed medley
Silver medal – second place	2022 Budapest	4×100 m medley
Silver medal – second place	2023 Fukuoka	50 m breaststroke
Silver medal – second place	2023 Fukuoka	100 m breaststroke
Bronze medal – third place	2022 Budapest	100 m breaststroke
Bronze medal – third place	2023 Fukuoka	4×100 m mixed medley
Bronze medal – third place	2024 Doha	50 m breaststroke
Bronze medal – third place	2024 Doha	200 m breaststroke
World Championships (SC)
Gold medal – first place	2021 Abu Dhabi	50 m breaststroke
Gold medal – first place	2021 Abu Dhabi	200 m breaststroke
Gold medal – first place	2021 Abu Dhabi	4×50 m medley
Gold medal – first place	2022 Melbourne	50 m breaststroke
Gold medal – first place	2022 Melbourne	100 m breaststroke
Gold medal – first place	2022 Melbourne	4×100 m medley
Gold medal – first place	2022 Melbourne	4×50 m mixed medley
Silver medal – second place	2021 Abu Dhabi	4×50 m mixed medley
Silver medal – second place	2021 Abu Dhabi	4×100 m medley
Silver medal – second place	2022 Melbourne	200 m breaststroke
Silver medal – second place	2022 Melbourne	4×50 m medley
Bronze medal – third place	2021 Abu Dhabi	100 m breaststroke
Pan Pacific Championships
Silver medal – second place	2014 Gold Coast	200 m breaststroke
Pan American Games
Gold medal – first place	2019 Lima	4×100 m medley
Silver medal – second place	2019 Lima	200 m breaststroke
World Junior Championships
Gold medal – first place	2011 Lima	4×100 m medley

Nicolas Fink (born July 3, 1993) is an American competitive swimmer. He is a five-time world champion in breaststroke events and a 2024 Olympic Silver Medalist in the 100 meter breaststroke. He is a world record holder in the short course 4×100 meter medley relay and 4×50 meter mixed medley relay. He is the Americas record holder in the short course 50 meter breaststroke, 100 meter breaststroke, and 200 meter breaststroke as well as the American record holder in the long course 50 meter breaststroke. In the 50 meter breaststroke, he won the World Short Course titles in 2021 and 2022 and World Long Course title in 2022. In the 100 meter breaststroke, he is the 2022 World Short Course gold medalist. In the 200 meter breaststroke, he is the 2021 World Short Course gold medalist.

== Early life and education ==
Fink grew up in Morristown, New Jersey and attended Pingry School. He started dreaming about being an Olympian while watching swimming on television as a kid.

Fink has trained with a number of swim teams around the world, including Saint Petersburg Aquatics, where he swam alongside athletes such as Robert Finke, Joshua McQueen, and Melanie Margalis. Collegiately, Fink competed for the Georgia Bulldogs of the University of Georgia, signing his official letter of intent in fall 2010. He went to school to study engineering and works in a full-time engineering job while swimming.

== Career ==
=== 2012 ===
==== 2012 Olympic Trials ====
Fink competed at his first US Olympic Trials in 2012 at the 2012 USA Swimming Olympic Trials held in Omaha, Nebraska in June and July. He placed 11th in the 100 meter breaststroke with a time of 1:01.14, 17th in the 200 meter breaststroke with a 2:13.89, and 26th in the 200 meter individual medley with his time of 2:03.69. He did not qualify for the 2012 US Olympic Team in any of the events he raced.

=== 2013 ===
==== 2013 National Championships ====
Fink broke out onto the national scene after he placed 2nd in the 2013 US National Championships in the 100m breaststroke with a time of 1:00.24. Fink also placed 3rd in the 200m breaststroke and 6th in the 50m breaststroke.

==== 2013 World Championships ====
At the 2013 World Aquatics Championships in Barcelona, Fink placed 8th in the final of the 100m breaststroke with a time of 1:00.10.

=== 2014 ===
==== 2014 Pan Pacific Championships ====
2014 Pan Pacific Championships
Silver medal – second place	200 m breaststroke	2:08.94

Fink made the US team for the 2014 Pan Pacific Championships in Gold Coast, Australia, with his performances at the 2014 National Championships in Irvine, California. In the final of the 200 meter breaststroke, Fink swam a 2:08.94, winning the silver medal as one of only two competitors to swim under 2:10.00 in the final with the other being Yasuhiro Koseki of Japan who won the gold medal. Fink's swims at both championships earned him a spot on the US National Team in swimming for the 2014—2015 year, making him one of twelve student athletes from the University of Georgia to be named to the year's team. His race in the 200 meter breaststroke at the 2014 Pan Pacific Championships also earned him a nomination for USA Swimming's Golden Goggle Award for "Male Race of the Year".

=== 2016 ===
==== 2016 Olympic Trials ====
At the 2016 US Olympic Trials in Omaha, Nebraska, Fink placed 7th in the 100 meter breaststroke final with a time of 1:00.39 and placed 7th in the 200 meter breaststroke with a time of 2:11.55 in the final. This was the second time Fink competed at the US Olympic Trials as well as the second time he did not make the US Olympic Team.

=== 2019—2020 ===
==== 2019 Pan American Games ====
2019 Pan American Games
Gold medal – first place	4×100 m medley relay	3:30.25 (GR)
Silver medal – second place	200 m breaststroke	2:08.16

For the 2019 Pan American Games in Lima, Peru, Fink was named to the USA Swimming Team in the 200 meter breaststroke. On the third day of competition, Fink won a silver medal in the 200 meter breaststroke with his time of 2:08.16 and finished less than six tenths of a second behind the gold medalist in the event and fellow American Will Licon. On the fifth and final day of competition, Fink swam the breaststroke leg of the 4×100 meter medley relay in a time of 58.57 seconds, and along with his relay teammates of Daniel Carr (backstroke), Tom Shields (butterfly), and Nathan Adrian (freestyle) won the gold medal in a new Pan American Games record time of 3:30.25.

==== International Swimming League ====
In 2019 he was a member of the inaugural International Swimming League representing the Cali Condors, who finished third place in the final match in Las Vegas, Nevada in December. Fink won both the 50 and 200 breaststroke for the Condors at the final. His time of 25.75 seconds in the 50 meter breaststroke set a new American record for the event.

The following year, in the 2020 season of the International Swimming League, Fink set new American records in the 100 meter breaststroke with a time of 56.16 seconds and in the 200 meter breaststroke with a 2:02.20.

=== 2021 ===
==== 2020 Olympic Trials ====
NBC Sports: Fink wins 200 m breaststroke at US Olympic Trials

In June 2021, Fink qualified for the 2020 Olympic Games by placing first at the US Olympic Team Trials in the 200 meter breaststroke with a personal best time of 2:07.55. This marked the first time in three Olympic Games cycles that Fink made the US Olympic Team, he had previously tried and not made the team at both the 2012 and 2016 US Olympic Trials. In the semifinals of the 100 meter breaststroke, Fink also swam a personal best time of 58.50 seconds which moved him up in rankings to the second fastest male American swimmer in the event only behind Michael Andrew who won the semifinals heat in an American record time of 58.14. In the final of the 100 meter breaststroke Fink finished in third place and did not make the US Olympic team in the event.

==== 2020 Summer Olympics ====
Following the US Olympic Trials, Fink returned to New Jersey for a week, then was off to the US Olympic swim team training camp, and after that the 2020 Summer Olympics in Tokyo, Japan. In the preliminaries of the 200 meter breaststroke on day four of swimming competition, he finished in a time of 2:08.48 and advanced to the semifinals ranked fourth overall. He swam a 2:08.00 in the semifinals, finishing second in his semifinal heat and ranking fourth overall heading into the final. In the final, he swam faster than in the semifinals with a time of 2:07.93 and placed fifth.

==== 2021 International Swimming League ====
Fink set a new American record in the short course 50 meter breaststroke with a time of 25.72 seconds at the final match of the 2021 International Swimming League in Eindhoven, Netherlands. Later the same day, he set a new Americas record and American record in the 4x100 meter medley relay, splitting a time of 55.21 seconds for the breaststroke leg of the relay and contributing to the new record time of 3:19.64 with club Cali Condors relay teammates Coleman Stewart, Caeleb Dressel, and Justin Ress. The next day, Fink set a new Americas record and American record in the 100 meter breaststroke with a time of 55.56 seconds, earning 19 points for his team. His time of 55.56 seconds moved him up in the world rankings to the third fastest male swimmer in the event, ranking behind only Ilya Shymanovich of Belarus and Adam Peaty of Great Britain. For his performances in the final match, Fink earned 59.5 most valuable player points, ranking second behind Sarah Sjöström of Energy Standard.

==== 2021 World Short Course Championships ====
2021 World Championships (SC)
Gold medal – first place	200 m breaststroke	2:02.28
Gold medal – first place	4×50 m medley	1:30.51 (CR, AM)
Gold medal – first place	50 m breaststroke	25.53 (AM)
Silver medal – second place	4×50 m mixed medley	1:37.04
Silver medal – second place	4×100 m medley	3:20.50
Bronze medal – third place	100 m breaststroke	55.87

For the 2021 World Short Course Championships in Abu Dhabi, United Arab Emirates in December, Fink entered to compete in four individual events, the 50 meter breaststroke, 100 meter breaststroke, 200 meter breaststroke, and 100 meter individual medley. Fink started competition on day one, qualifying for the semifinals of the 100 meter breaststroke ranked third with a time of 57.02 seconds. In the semifinals he ranked second with a time of 56.48 seconds, seven-hundredths of a second slower than number one ranked Arno Kamminga of the Netherlands. Fink won the first World Championships medal of his career in the final of the 100 meter breaststroke, finishing third to win the bronze medal with a time of 55.87 seconds.

Fink finished fifth in his heat in the prelims of the 100 meter individual medley in the morning on day three with a time of 52.87 seconds, which qualified him to the semifinals ranking thirteenth. In his second event of the morning prelims session, the 200 meter breaststroke, Fink qualified for the final ranking seventh with a 2:04.72. For his third event of the morning, Fink split a 25.70 for the breaststroke leg of the 4×50 meter mixed medley relay, helping qualify the relay to the final ranked first in a total time of 1:37.74. In the final of the 200 meter breaststroke later in the day, Fink won the first world title of his career, winning the gold medal with a time of 2:02.28. In the semifinals of the 100 meter individual medley, Fink placed 16th and did not qualify for the final, swimming a time of 54.07 seconds. Finishing his competition on day three, Fink won a silver medal in the final of the 4×50 meter mixed medley relay, splitting a 25.82 for the breaststroke leg of the relay.

In the prelims heats on day five, Fink swam a 26.09 in the 50 meter breaststroke to advance to the semifinals ranking fifth. On the finals relay in the 4×50 meter medley relay with Shaine Casas, Tom Shields, and Ryan Held, Fink helped tie for the gold medal, set a new American record, and tie the Americas record and Championships record at 1:30.51. Later in the same session, Fink set a new American in the 50 meter breaststroke with a 25.68 in the semifinals and qualified for the final ranking second. The sixth and final day of competition, Fink set a new Americas record and a new American record in the 50 meter breaststroke with a time of 25.53 seconds and won the gold medal. In the final of the 4×100 meter medley relay Fink won his second silver medal of the day, splitting a 55.27 for the breaststroke leg of the relay to help finish in a time of 3:20.50.

=== 2022 ===
==== 2022 International Team Trials ====
At the 2022 US International Team Trials in Greensboro, North Carolina in late April, Fink won the 100 meter breaststroke with a personal best time of 58.37 seconds, qualifying for the 2022 World Aquatics Championships team in the event. Earlier in the competition, he qualified for the World Championships team in the 200 meter breaststroke, tying for first-place with a time of 2:08.84, and the 50 meter breaststroke, placing seconds with a personal best time of 26.55 seconds. While he qualified for the team in three individual events, USA Swimming named him to the team roster in just the 100 meter and 200 meter breaststroke. Three days after the first version of the roster was released, USA Swimming announced an updated roster with Fink in three individual events, adding the 50 meter breaststroke to his program.

==== 2022 World Aquatics Championships ====
2022 World Championships (LC)
Gold medal – first place	50 m breaststroke	26.45 (NR)
Gold medal – first place	4×100 m mixed medley	3:38.79
Silver medal – second place	4×100 m medley	3:27.79
Bronze medal – third place	100 m breaststroke	58.65

In the final of the 100 meter breaststroke at the 2022 World Aquatics Championships, contested on day two of pool swimming competition, Fink won the bronze medal with a time of 58.65 seconds, finishing 0.39 seconds behind gold medalist Nicolò Martinenghi of Italy. On the fourth evening at Danube Arena, he started off with winning the world title in the 50 meter breaststroke, finishing in an American record time of 26.45 seconds to share the podium with bronze medalist and fellow American Michael Andrew. It marked his first long course World Championships gold medal after two gold medals and world titles in individual events at the short course World Championships the year before. Approximately 45 minutes later, he won a gold medal as part of the 4×100 meter mixed medley relay, splitting a 57.86 for the breaststroke leg of the relay to contribute to a first-place finish in 3:38.79.

Day six, in the final of his third individual event, the 200 meter breaststroke, Fink placed fifth with a time of 2:09.05, which was 1.98 seconds behind gold medalist and world record holder in the event Zac Stubblety-Cook of Australia. Two days later, on the eighth and final day, he won a silver medal in the 4×100 meter medley relay, swimming the breaststroke leg of the finals relay in 57.86 seconds to help finish in a time of 3:27.79.

==== 2022 World Short Course Championships ====
2022 World Championships (SC)
Gold medal – first place	4×50 m mixed medley	1:35.15 (WR)
Gold medal – first place	100 m breaststroke	55.88
Gold medal – first place	50 m breaststroke	25.38 (CR, AM)
Gold medal – first place	4×100 m medley	3:18.98 (WR)
Silver medal – second place	200 m breaststroke	2:01.60 (AM)
Silver medal – second place	4×50 m medley	1:30.37 (AM)

On October 19, Fink was publicly announced to the Team USA roster for the 2022 World Short Course Championships at Melbourne Sports and Aquatic Centre in Melbourne, Australia. Fifty-six days later, in his first final of the Championships, the 4×50 meter mixed medley relay on day two, he helped set a new world record with a finals relay mark of 1:35.15 and win the gold medal, splitting a 24.96 for the breaststroke leg of the relay. The following day, he won his first world title and gold medal in the 100 meter breaststroke at a short course or long course World Championships with a time of 55.88 seconds, finishing less than two-tenths of a second ahead of silver medalist Nicolò Martinenghi and less than four-tenths of a second ahead of bronze medalist Adam Peaty. The next day, he followed up with a silver medal-win in the 200 meter breaststroke, setting an Americas and American record with a time of 2:01.60 in the final to finish 1.25 seconds behind gold medalist Daiya Seto of Japan.

The fifth of six days, Fink swam the 50 meter breaststroke portion of the 4×50 meter medley relay in 25.24 seconds in the final, helping win the silver medal with an Americas and American record time of 1:30.37. On the final day, he started off by successfully defending his world title in the 50 meter breaststroke with a Championships, Americas, and American record time of 25.38 seconds to earn his second-consecutive title in the event and share the podium with Italians Nicolò Martinenghi (silver medalist) and Simone Cerasuolo (bronze medalist). Concluding competition in the 4×100 meter medley relay, he helped tie the team from Australia for the gold medal in a world record time of 3:18.98, swimming the breaststroke portion in 54.88 seconds.

=== 2024 ===
==== 2024 Olympic Trials ====
At the 2024 Olympic Trials, Fink qualified for the Olympics in the 100 Breaststroke.

==== 2024 Summer Olympics ====
2024 Summer Olympics
Silver medal – second place	100 m breaststroke	59.05

At the 2024 Summer Olympics, Fink competed in the 100 Breaststroke and tied for second place alongside Adam Peaty of Great Britain, securing himself a silver medal.

== Personal life ==
He is married to Melanie Margalis, who won a gold medal in swimming at the 2016 Summer Olympics, with whom he has a son. Fink has a master's in electric engineering and computer engineering from Georgia Tech, and works as an engineer for Quanta Services.

== International championships ==
Meet	50 breaststroke	100 breaststroke	200 breaststroke	100 medley	4×50 medley	4×100 medley	4×50 mixed medley	4×100 mixed medley
WJC 2011	7th	5th		—N/a	—N/a	1st place, gold medalist(s)	—N/a	—N/a
WC 2013		8th		—N/a	—N/a	DSQ (1st in heats)^{[a]}^{[b]}	—N/a	—N/a
PAC 2014	—N/a	4th	2nd place, silver medalist(s)	—N/a	—N/a		—N/a	—N/a
WC 2015		12th	10th	—N/a	—N/a		—N/a	
SCW 2016		7th	4th			DSQ (4th in heats)^{[a]}^{[b]}		—N/a
WC 2017			5th	—N/a	—N/a		—N/a	
PAN 2019	—N/a		2nd place, silver medalist(s)	—N/a	—N/a	1st place, gold medalist(s)	—N/a	
OG 2020	—N/a		5th	—N/a	—N/a		—N/a	
SCW 2021	1st place, gold medalist(s)	3rd place, bronze medalist(s)	1st place, gold medalist(s)	16th	1st place, gold medalist(s)	2nd place, silver medalist(s)	2nd place, silver medalist(s)	—N/a
WC 2022	1st place, gold medalist(s)	3rd place, bronze medalist(s)	5th	—N/a	—N/a	2nd place, silver medalist(s)	—N/a	1st place, gold medalist(s)
SCW 2022	1st place, gold medalist(s)	1st place, gold medalist(s)	2nd place, silver medalist(s)		2nd place, silver medalist(s)	1st place, gold medalist(s)	1st place, gold medalist(s)	—N/a
WC 2023	2nd place, silver medalist(s)	2nd place, silver medalist(s)		—N/a	—N/a	1st place, gold medalist(s)	—N/a	3rd place, bronze medalist(s)
WC 2024	3rd place, bronze medalist(s)	1st place, gold medalist(s)	3rd place, bronze medalist(s)	—N/a	—N/a	1st place, gold medalist(s)	—N/a	1st place, gold medalist(s)

^{a} Fink swam only in the prelims heats.
^{b} Fink was not a member of the finals relay that was disqualified.

== Personal best times ==
=== Long course meters (50 m pool) ===
Event	Time	Meet	Location	Date	Note(s)
50 m breaststroke	26.45	2022 World Aquatics Championships	Budapest, Hungary	June 21, 2022	NR
100 m breaststroke	58.36	2023 US International Team Trials	Indianapolis, Indiana	June 27, 2023	
200 m breaststroke	2:07.55	2020 US Olympic Trials	Omaha, Nebraska	June 17, 2021	
200 m individual medley	2:03.69	2012 US Olympic Trials	Omaha, Nebraska	June 29, 2012	

Legend: e – equalled existing record; NR – American record;
Records not set in finals: h – heat; sf – semifinal; r – relay 1st leg; rh – relay heat 1st leg; b – B final; † – en route to final mark; so – swim-off; tt – time trial

=== Short course meters (25 m pool) ===
Event	Time	Meet	Location	Date	Note(s)
50 m breaststroke	25.38	2022 World Short Course Championships	Melbourne, Australia	December 18, 2022	AM, NR
100 m breaststroke	55.56	2021 International Swimming League	Eindhoven, Netherlands	December 4, 2021	AM, NR
200 m breaststroke	2:01.60	2022 World Short Course Championships	Melbourne, Australia	December 16, 2022	AM, NR

Legend: AM – Americas record; e – equalled existing record; NR – American record;
Records not set in finals: h – heat; sf – semifinal; r – relay 1st leg; rh – relay heat 1st leg; b – B final; † – en route to final mark; so – swim-off; tt – time trial

== Swimming World Cup circuits ==
The following medals Fink has won at Swimming World Cup circuits.

Edition	Gold medals	Silver medals	Bronze medals	Total
2015	1	2	1	4
2017	0	0	1	1
2018	0	0	2	2
2022	9	0	0	9
Total	10	2	4	16

== World records ==
=== Short course meters (25 m pool) ===
No.	Event	Time	Meet	Location	Date	Status	Ref
1	4×50 m mixed medley	1:35.15	2022 World Short Course Championships	Melbourne, Australia	December 14, 2022	Existing	
2	4×100 m medley	3:18.98	2022 World Short Course Championships	Melbourne, Australia	December 18, 2022	Existing	

== Continental and national records ==
=== Long course meters (50 m pool) ===
No.	Event	Time	Meet	Location	Date	Age	Type	Status	Ref
1	50 m breaststroke	26.45	2022 World Aquatics Championships	Budapest, Hungary	June 21, 2022	28	NR	Current	

Legend: NR – American record

=== Short course meters (25 m pool) ===
No.	Event	Time	Meet	Location	Date	Age	Type	Status	Notes	Ref
1	50 m breaststroke	25.75	2019 International Swimming League	Las Vegas, Nevada	December 20, 2019	26	NR, US	Current US		
2	100 m breaststroke	56.16	2020 International Swimming League	Budapest, Hungary	November 22, 2020	27	AM, NR	Former		
3	200 m breaststroke	2:02.20	2020 International Swimming League	Budapest, Hungary	November 21, 2020	27	AM, NR	Former		
4	50 m breaststroke (2)	25.72	2021 International Swimming League	Eindhoven, Netherlands	December 3, 2021	28	NR	Former		
5	4×100 m medley	3:19.64	2021 International Swimming League	Eindhoven, Netherlands	December 3, 2021	28	AM, NR	Former		
6	100 m breaststroke (2)	55.56	2021 International Swimming League	Eindhoven, Netherlands	December 4, 2021	28	AM, NR	Current		
7	4×50 m medley	1:30.51	2021 World Short Course Championships	Abu Dhabi, United Arab Emirates	December 20, 2021	28	AM, NR	Former		
8	50 m breaststroke (3)	25.68	2021 World Short Course Championships	Abu Dhabi, United Arab Emirates	December 20, 2021	28	NR	Former		
9	50 m breaststroke (4)	25.53	2021 World Short Course Championships	Abu Dhabi, United Arab Emirates	December 21, 2021	28	AM, NR	Former		
10	4×50 m mixed medley	1:35.15	2022 World Short Course Championships	Melbourne, Australia	December 14, 2022	29	AM, NR	Current	WR	
11	200 m breaststroke (2)	2:01.60	2022 World Short Course Championships	Melbourne, Australia	December 16, 2022	29	AM, NR	Current		
12	4×50 m medley (2)	1:30.37	2022 World Short Course Championships	Melbourne, Australia	December 17, 2022	29	AM, NR	Current		
13	50 m breaststroke (5)	25.38	2022 World Short Course Championships	Melbourne, Australia	December 18, 2022	29	AM, NR	Current		
14	4×100 m medley (2)	3:18.98	2022 World Short Course Championships	Melbourne, Australia	December 18, 2022	29	AM, NR	Current	WR	

Legend: WR – World record; AM – Americas record; e – equalled existing record; NR – American record; US – U.S. Open record;
Records not set in finals: h – heat; sf – semifinal; r – relay 1st leg; rh – relay heat 1st leg; b – B final; † – en route to final mark; so – swim-off; tt – time trial

== Awards and honors ==
- SwimSwam, Swammy Award, U.S. Swimmer of the Year (Male): 2022
- SwimSwam, Top 100 (Men's): 2022 (#43)
- SwimSwam, Ultra Swimmer of the Month: December 2021
- University of Georgia, Joel Eaves Scholar Athlete Award (male): 2014—2015
- Golden Goggle Award nominee, Male Race of the Year: 2014

== See also ==
- List of World Swimming Championships (25 m) medalists (men)
- List of United States records in swimming
