= 2014 Pan Pacific Swimming Championships – Men's 200 metre breaststroke =

Men's 200 metre breaststroke at the 2014 Pan Pacific Swimming Championships
- Venue: Gold Coast Aquatic Centre
- Dates: August 24, 2014 (heats & finals)
- Competitors: 19
- Winning time: 2:08.57

Medalists
gold medal	Yasuhiro Koseki	Japan
silver medal	Nicholas Fink	United States
bronze medal	Kazuki Kohinata	Japan

The men's 200 metre breaststroke competition at the 2014 Pan Pacific Swimming Championships took place on August 24 at the Gold Coast Aquatic Centre. The last champion was Kosuke Kitajima of Japan.

This race consisted of four lengths of the pool, all in breaststroke.

== Records ==
Prior to this competition, the existing world and Pan Pacific records were as follows:

World record	Akihiro Yamaguchi (JPN)	2:07.01	Gifu, Japan	September 15, 2012
Pan Pacific Championships record	Kosuke Kitajima (JPN)	2:08.36	Irvine, United States	August 21, 2010

== Results ==
All times are in minutes and seconds.

KEY:	q	Fastest non-qualifiers	Q	Qualified	CR	Championships record	NR	National record	PB	Personal best	SB	Seasonal best

=== Heats ===
The first round was held on August 24, at 12:55.

Rank	Name	Nationality	Time	Notes
1	Nicolas Fink	United States	2:09.64	QA
2	Kevin Cordes	United States	2:10.01	QA
3	Kazuki Kohinata	Japan	2:10.30	QA
4	Yasuhiro Koseki	Japan	2:10.43	QA
5	Josh Prenot	United States	2:11.19	QA
6	Naoya Tomita	Japan	2:11.98	QA
7	Yuta Oshikiri	Japan	2:12.14	QA
8	Richard Funk	Canada	2:12.50	QA
9	Tales Cerdeira	Brazil	2:12.93	QB
10	Glenn Snyders	New Zealand	2:13.77	QB
11	Thiago Simon	Brazil	2:14.20	QB
12	Cody Miller	United States	2:14.43	QB
13	Felipe França	Brazil	2:14.62	QB
14	Lyam Dias	Canada	2:16.34	QB
15	Mack Darragh	Canada	2:16.75	QB
16	Ronald Tsui	Hong Kong	2:20.29	QB
17	Song Molin	China	2:20.46	
18	Joshua Hall	Philippines	2:20.48	
19	Jared Pike	South Africa	2:23.11	

=== B Final ===
The B final was held on August 24, at 20:54.

Rank	Name	Nationality	Time	Notes
9	Naoya Tomita	Japan	2:11.45	
10	Yuta Oshikiri	Japan	2:11.97	
11	Cody Miller	United States	2:13.40	
12	Mack Darragh	Canada	2:17.23	
13	Song Molin	China	2:19.64	
14	Ronald Tsui	Hong Kong	2:20.52	
15	Joshua Hall	Philippines	2:23.13	
16	Jared Pike	South Africa	2:24.72	

=== A Final ===
The A final was held on August 24, at 20:54.

Rank	Name	Nationality	Time	Notes
1st place, gold medalist(s)	Yasuhiro Koseki	Japan	2:08.57	
2nd place, silver medalist(s)	Nicholas Fink	United States	2:08.94	
3rd place, bronze medalist(s)	Kazuki Kohinata	Japan	2:10.14	
4	Josh Prenot	United States	2:11.05	
5	Tales Cerdeira	Brazil	2:11.49	
6	Richard Funk	Canada	2:13.75	
7	Thiago Simon	Brazil	2:13.89	
8	Lyam Dias	Canada	2:16.19	
