= 2018 FINA World Swimming Championships (25 m) – Men's 200 metre breaststroke =

Men's 200 metre breaststroke at the 2018 FINA World Swimming Championships (25 m)
- Venue: Hangzhou Sports Park Stadium
- Dates: 13 December (heats and final)
- Competitors: 46 from 40 nations
- Winning time: 2:00.16 WR

Medalists
gold medal	Kirill Prigoda	Russia
silver medal	Qin Haiyang	China
bronze medal	Marco Koch	Germany

The Men's 200 metre breaststroke competition of the 2018 FINA World Swimming Championships (25 m) was held on 13 December 2018.

== Records ==
Prior to the competition, the existing world and championship records were as follows.

	Name	Nation	Time	Location	Date
World record	Marco Koch	Germany	2:00.44	Berlin	20 November 2016
Championship record	Marco Koch	Germany	2:01.21	Windsor	8 December 2016

The following new records were set during this competition:

Date	Event	Name	Nation	Time	Record
13 December	Final	Kirill Prigoda	Russia	2:00.16	WR, CR

== Results ==
=== Heats ===
The heats were started at 11:05.

Rank	Heat	Lane	Name	Nationality	Time	Notes
1	5	6	Qin Haiyang	China	2:01.64	Q, NR
2	5	4	Kirill Prigoda	Russia	2:01.82	Q
3	4	4	Marco Koch	Germany	2:02.83	Q
4	5	1	Josh Prenot	United States	2:03.23	Q
5	4	5	Yasuhiro Koseki	Japan	2:03.41	Q
6	4	3	Erik Persson	Sweden	2:03.51	Q, NR
7	3	4	Mikhail Dorinov	Russia	2:03.84	Q
8	5	5	Arno Kamminga	Netherlands	2:03.88	Q
9	5	8	Andrew Wilson	United States	2:04.02	
10	3	7	Anton Sveinn McKee	Iceland	2:04.37	NR
11	3	3	Yukihiro Takahashi	Japan	2:04.68	
12	3	2	Tomáš Klobučník	Slovakia	2:04.85	
12	5	3	Ilya Shymanovich	Belarus	2:04.85	
14	3	5	Caio Pumputis	Brazil	2:05.00	
15	4	0	Andrius Šidlauskas	Lithuania	2:05.99	NR
16	5	2	Martin Allikvee	Estonia	2:06.23	
17	4	1	Thibaut Capitaine	France	2:06.38	
18	4	6	Yan Zibei	China	2:07.10	
19	3	1	Luca Pizzini	Italy	2:07.28	
20	3	6	Dávid Horváth	Hungary	2:07.49	
21	2	4	Darragh Greene	Ireland	2:07.60	NR
22	2	3	Carlos Claverie	Venezuela	2:07.83	
23	4	2	Yannick Käser	Switzerland	2:08.00	
24	4	7	Ayrton Sweeney	South Africa	2:08.15	
25	3	8	Berkay Omer Ogretir	Turkey	2:08.32	NR
26	5	7	Giedrius Titenis	Lithuania	2:08.44	
27	2	2	Lyubomir Epitropov	Bulgaria	2:08.51	
28	3	9	Maximilian Pilger	Germany	2:08.73	
29	2	8	David Schlicht	Australia	2:09.12	
30	5	9	Cai Bing Rong	Chinese Taipei	2:09.30	
31	4	9	Mykyta Koptielov	Ukraine	2:10.26	
32	2	5	Raphaël Stacchiotti	Luxembourg	2:10.37	
33	5	0	Denis Petrashov	Kyrgyzstan	2:11.27	
34	3	0	George Schroder	New Zealand	2:11.45	
35	4	8	Daniils Bobrovs	Latvia	2:11.63	
36	2	1	Phạm Thanh Bảo	Vietnam	2:11.79	NR
37	1	4	Adriel Sanes	United States Virgin Islands	2:13.65	
38	1	5	Arnoldo Herrera	Costa Rica	2:13.81	NR
39	2	0	Amro Al-Wir	Jordan	2:13.83	NR
40	2	6	Taichi Vakasama	Fiji	2:13.84	NR
41	2	7	Alberto Batungbacal	Philippines	2:16.67	
42	2	9	Liam Davis	Zimbabwe	2:17.01	
43	1	7	Felipe Gomes	Malawi	2:19.33	NR
44	1	2	Nkosi Dunwoody	Barbados	2:22.54	
45	1	3	Vali Israfilov	Azerbaijan	2:23.04	
46	1	6	Alejandro Panting	Honduras	2:23.60	

=== Final ===
The final was held at 19:00.

Rank	Lane	Name	Nationality	Time	Notes
1st place, gold medalist(s)	5	Kirill Prigoda	Russia	2:00.16	WR
2nd place, silver medalist(s)	4	Qin Haiyang	China	2:01.15	AS
3rd place, bronze medalist(s)	3	Marco Koch	Germany	2:01.42	
4	2	Yasuhiro Koseki	Japan	2:02.18	
5	6	Josh Prenot	United States	2:03.12	
6	1	Mikhail Dorinov	Russia	2:03.20	
7	8	Arno Kamminga	Netherlands	2:03.72	
8	7	Erik Persson	Sweden	2:04.15	
