= 2021 FINA World Swimming Championships (25 m) – Men's 50 metre breaststroke =

Swimming competition

Men's 50 metre breaststroke at the 2021 FINA World Swimming Championships (25 m)
- Venue: Etihad Arena
- Location: Abu Dhabi, United Arab Emirates
- Dates: 20 December (heats and semifinals); 21 December (final)
- Competitors: 55 from 52 nations
- Winning time: 25.53

Medalists
gold medal	Nic Fink	United States
silver medal	Nicolò Martinenghi	Italy
bronze medal	João Gomes Júnior	Brazil

The Men's 50 metre breaststroke competition of the 2021 FINA World Swimming Championships (25 m) was held on 20 and 21 December 2021.

== Records ==
Prior to the competition, the existing world and championship records were as follows.

World record	Cameron van der Burgh (RSA) Ilya Shymanovich (BLR)	25.25	Berlin, Germany Kazan, Russia	14 November 2009 7 November 2021
Competition record	Cameron van der Burgh (RSA)	25.41	Hangzhou, China	16 December 2018

== Results ==
=== Heats ===
The heats were started on 20 December at 11:22.

Rank	Heat	Lane	Name	Nationality	Time	Notes
1	7	4	Ilya Shymanovich	Belarus	25.77	Q
2	6	4	Emre Sakçı	Turkey	25.87	Q
3	5	3	João Gomes Júnior	Brazil	26.01	Q
4	5	4	Nicolò Martinenghi	Italy	26.02	Q
5	6	5	Nic Fink	United States	26.09	Q
6	7	5	Arno Kamminga	Netherlands	26.20	Q
7	7	6	Andrei Nikolaev	Russian Swimming Federation	26.24	Q
8	6	3	Kirill Strelnikov	Russian Swimming Federation	26.25	Q
9	5	5	Fabian Schwingenschlögl	Germany	26.34	Q
10	6	7	Moon Jae-kwon	South Korea	26.46	Q
11	5	2	Olli Kokko	Finland	26.54	Q
11	6	6	Bernhard Reitshammer	Austria	26.54	Q
13	5	6	Tobias Bjerg	Denmark	26.71	Q
13	6	1	Yan Zibei	China	26.71	Q
15	7	2	Kristian Pitshugin	Israel	26.74	Q
16	5	8	Lucas Matzerath	Germany	26.81	Q
17	7	1	Bradley Tandy	South Africa	26.85	
18	6	9	Rostyslav Kryzhanivskyi	Ukraine	26.89	
19	6	0	Youssef El-Kamash	Egypt	26.90	NR
20	4	2	Josué Domínguez	Dominican Republic	26.91	NR
21	3	4	Jadon Wuilliez	Netherlands Antilles	26.98	NR
22	6	2	Andrius Šidlauskas	Lithuania	27.06	
23	5	1	Denis Petrashov	Kyrgyzstan	27.14	
24	5	9	Izaak Bastian	Bahamas	27.24	NR
25	4	1	Mariano Lazzerini	Chile	27.35	NR
26	4	3	Julio Horrego	Honduras	27.38	NR
27	7	0	André Grindheim	Norway	27.39	
28	7	8	Matěj Zábojník	Czech Republic	27.41	
29	5	0	Ng Yan Kin	Hong Kong	27.73	
30	4	7	Miguel de Lara	Mexico	28.22	
31	4	6	Patrick Pelegrina	Andorra	28.29	
32	4	8	Abobakr Abass	Sudan	28.51	NR
33	4	9	Ziyad Al-Salous	Jordan	28.77	NR
34	7	9	Sébastien Kouma	Mali	28.81	
35	3	5	Muhammad Isa Ahmad	Brunei	29.32	NR
36	3	6	Kerry Ollivierre	Grenada	29.53	
37	3	8	Terrel Monplaisir	Saint Lucia	29.84	
38	3	3	Bransly Dirksz	Aruba	29.94	
39	2	2	Hilal Hemed Hilal	Tanzania	29.97	
40	3	1	Bryson George	Saint Vincent and the Grenadines	29.99	
41	3	2	Omar Al-Hatem	Kuwait	31.16	
42	2	8	Muhammad Mustafa	Pakistan	32.39	
43	2	7	Abdulmalek Ashur	Libya	33.24	
44	2	0	Antonio Habis	Palestine	33.44	
45	2	1	Omar Darboe	Gambia	35.42	
46	3	0	Mohamed Kamara	Sierra Leone	35.47	
47	2	9	Cedrick Niyibizi	Rwanda	35.90	
48	1	6	Yacouba Mouctar	Niger	36.17	
49	2	5	Houmed Houssein Barkat	Djibouti	37.02	NR
50	1	4	Barkwende Yougbare	Burkina Faso	38.17	
51	2	3	Teddy Regoballes	Central African Republic	53.22	
	1	3	Georgios Spanoudakis	Greece	DSQ	
	4	0	Filipe Gomes	Malawi	DSQ	
	1	3	Renato Prono	Paraguay	DSQ	
	4	0	Christopher Rothbauer	Austria	DSQ	
	1	5	Fabrice Mopama Sukasuka	Democratic Republic of the Congo	DNS	
	2	4	Diosdado Miko Eyanga	Equatorial Guinea	DNS	
	2	6	Yousef Al-Washali	Yemen	DNS	
	3	7	Fahim Anwari	Afghanistan	DNS	
	3	9	Sean Walters	Turks and Caicos Islands	DNS	
	4	4	Jorge Murillo	Colombia	DNS	
	4	5	Martin Melconian	Uruguay	DNS	
	6	8	Tomáš Klobučník	Slovakia	DNS	
	7	3	Michael Andrew	United States	DNS	

=== Semifinals ===
The semifinals were started on 20 December at 19:03.

Rank	Heat	Lane	Name	Nationality	Time	Notes
1	2	4	Ilya Shymanovich	Belarus	25.55	Q
2	2	3	Nic Fink	United States	25.68	Q, NR
3	1	5	Nicolò Martinenghi	Italy	25.87	Q
4	2	2	Fabian Schwingenschlögl	Germany	25.94	Q
5	2	5	João Gomes Júnior	Brazil	25.96	Q
6	1	1	Yan Zibei	China	26.18	Q, NR
7	1	3	Arno Kamminga	Netherlands	26.21	Q
7	1	7	Bernhard Reitshammer	Austria	26.21	Q
9	2	6	Andrei Nikolaev	Russian Swimming Federation	26.25	
10	1	6	Kirill Strelnikov	Russian Swimming Federation	26.33	
11	1	2	Moon Jae-kwon	South Korea	26.37	NR
12	2	1	Tobias Bjerg	Denmark	26.45	
13	2	8	Kristian Pitshugin	Israel	26.46	
14	1	8	Lucas Matzerath	Germany	26.50	
15	2	7	Olli Kokko	Finland	26.62	
	1	4	Emre Sakçı	Turkey	DSQ	

=== Final ===
The final was held on 21 December at 19:24.

Rank	Lane	Name	Nationality	Time	Notes
1st place, gold medalist(s)	5	Nic Fink	United States	25.53	AM
2nd place, silver medalist(s)	3	Nicolò Martinenghi	Italy	25.55	
3rd place, bronze medalist(s)	2	João Gomes Júnior	Brazil	25.80	
4	4	Ilya Shymanovich	Belarus	25.84	
5	6	Fabian Schwingenschlögl	Germany	26.16	
6	1	Arno Kamminga	Netherlands	26.32	
7	8	Bernhard Reitshammer	Austria	26.39	
8	7	Yan Zibei	China	26.49	
