= Caio Pumputis =

Brazilian swimmer (born 1999)

Personal information
- Full name: Caio Rodrigues Pumputis
- Nationality: Brazil
- Born: 8 January 1999 (age 27) São Paulo, São Paulo, Brazil
- Height: 1.83 m (6 ft 0 in)
- Weight: 76 kg (168 lb)

Sport
- Sport: Swimming
- Strokes: Breaststroke, Medley
- Club: Esporte Clube Pinheiros
- College team: Georgia Tech Yellow Jackets
Medal record
Men's swimming
Representing Brazil
World Championships (SC)
Bronze medal – third place	2024 Budapest	100 m medley
Pan American Games
Silver medal – second place	2019 Lima	200 m medley
South American Games
Gold medal – first place	2022 Asunción	200 m medley
Silver medal – second place	2022 Asunción	200 m breaststroke

Caio Rodrigues Pumputis (born 8 January 1999 in São Paulo) is a Brazilian swimmer.

== International career ==
=== 2018-2020 ===
On 28 August 2018, at the José Finkel Trophy (short course competition), he broke the South American record in the 100m medley, with a time of 51.83.

At the 2018 FINA World Swimming Championships (25 m) in Hangzhou, China, he obtained his first finals in World Championships, finishing 5th in the Men's 200 metre individual medley and 8th in the Men's 100 metre individual medley. He also finished 14th in the Men's 200 metre breaststroke.

At the 2019 World Aquatics Championships in Gwangju, South Korea, he finished 23rd in the Men's 200 metre individual medley, and was disqualified at the Men's 200 metre breaststroke.

At the 2019 Pan American Games held in Lima, Peru, Pumputis competed with a groin injury that significantly disrupted his performance, but even so, he won a silver medal in the Men's 200 metre individual medley., and finished 11th in the Men's 200 metre breaststroke.

=== 2020 Summer Olympics ===
At the 2020 Summer Olympics in Tokyo, Pumputis finished 19th in the Men's 200 metre individual medley and 34th in the Men's 100 metre breaststroke

=== 2021-2024 ===
Pumputis competed at the collegiate level for Georgia Tech.

At the 2021 FINA World Swimming Championships (25 m), in Abu Dhabi, United Arab Emirates, he finished 4th in the Men's 4 × 100 metre medley relay, 8th in the Men's 200 metre breaststroke final, 10th in the Men's 200 metre individual medley 14th in the Men's 100 metre individual medley and helped Brazil to go to the Men's 4 × 50 metre medley relay final.

At the 2022 World Aquatics Championships held in Budapest, Hungary, he finished 19th in the Men's 200 metre breaststroke and was disqualified at the Men's 200 metre individual medley.

At the 2022 FINA World Swimming Championships (25 m), in Melbourne, Australia, he went to the Men's 200 metre breaststroke final, where he was disqualified. He also finished 11th in the Men's 100 metre breaststroke and in the Men's 100 metre individual medley, 15th in the Men's 200 metre individual medley and was disqualified in the Men's 4 × 50 metre medley relay.

At the 2024 World Aquatics Swimming Championships (25 m), he broke the South American record in the 100m medley three times to win the bronze medal, his first in the world championships.
