= Steven Insixiengmay =

Laotian-American swimmer (born 2004)

Steven Insixiengmay OLY
Personal information
- National team: Laos
- Born: January 24, 2004 (age 22) Winston-Salem, North Carolina, U.S.

Sport
- Sport: Swimming
- College team: University of Georgia

Steven Insixiengmay (born 21 January 2004) is a Laotian American swimmer who competes internationally for Laos.

== Early life ==
Born in Winston-Salem, North Carolina to parents from Vientiane, Laos, he attended Forsyth Country Day School for whom he won the 100 breaststroke at the North Carolina Independent Schools Division II State Championships for four consecutive years. He was selected to participate in USA Swimming’s 2020 National Select Camp. He committed to the University of Georgia in October 2021.

== Career ==
He joined the Laos national swim team in 2023. He competed at the 2023 SEA Games in Cambodia. He set national records in the 50m, 100m and 200m breaststroke. He was also part of the Laos relay medley team which set a new national record.

In July 2024, he was selected to compete for Laos at the 2024 Paris Olympics.

== Personal life ==
He started swimming lessons at ten years-old to help him overcome a fear of water. He also does Taekwondo.
