= Ilya Shymanovich =

Belarusian swimmer (born 1994)

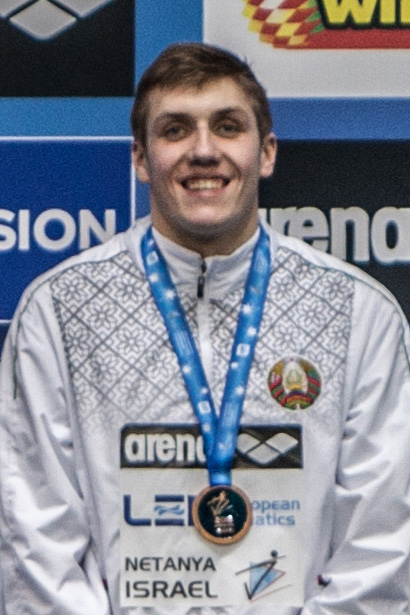

Personal information
- Full name: Ilya Syarheyevich Shymanovich
- National team: Belarus
- Born: 2 August 1994 (age 32)
- Height: 1.94 m (6 ft 4 in)
- Weight: 88 kg (194 lb)

Sport
- Country: Belarus; Authorised Neutral Athletes (since 2024)
- Sport: Swimming
- Strokes: Breaststroke
Medal record
Men's swimming
Event	1st	2nd	3rd
World Championships (SC)	1	2	2
European Championships (LC)	0	1	0
European Championships (SC)	2	3	2
Total	3	6	4
Representing Neutral Athletes A
World Championships (SC)
Bronze medal – third place	2024 Budapest	100 m breaststroke
Representing Belarus
World Championships (SC)
Gold medal – first place	2021 Abu Dhabi	100 m breaststroke
Silver medal – second place	2018 Hangzhou	50 m breaststroke
Silver medal – second place	2018 Hangzhou	100 m breaststroke
Bronze medal – third place	2016 Windsor	4x50 m medley
European Championships (LC)
Silver medal – second place	2020 Budapest	50 m breaststroke
European Championships (SC)
Gold medal – first place	2021 Kazan	200 m breaststroke
Gold medal – first place	2021 Kazan	50 m breaststroke
Silver medal – second place	2017 Copenhagen	4×50 m mixed medley
Silver medal – second place	2019 Glasgow	100 m breaststroke
Silver medal – second place	2021 Kazan	100 m breaststroke
Bronze medal – third place	2015 Netanya	4×50 m medley
Bronze medal – third place	2015 Netanya	4×50 m mixed medley
Bronze medal – third place	2017 Copenhagen	4×50 m medley
Bronze medal – third place	2019 Glasgow	4x50 m medley

Ilya Syarheyevich Shymanovich (Belarusian: Ілья Сяргеевіч Шымановіч; born 2 August 1994) is a Belarusian swimmer. He is the world record holder in the short course 100 metre breaststroke and a former world record holder in the short course 50 metre breaststroke. At the 2018 World Championships he won two silver medals, one each in the 100 metre breaststroke and the 50 metre breaststroke. He won two gold medals, one in the 50 metre breaststroke and one in the 200 metre breaststroke, and a silver medal, in the 100 metre breaststroke, at the 2021 European Short Course Championships. At the 2021 World Short Course Championships he won the gold medal in the 100 metre breaststroke.

== Career ==
=== 2017 World Championships ===
At the 2017 World Aquatics Championships in Budapest, Hungary, Shymanovich competed in the men's 50 metre breaststroke event.

=== 2018 World Championships ===
Competing on the global level at the 2018 World Short Course Championships in Hangzhou, China, Shymanovich won his first medal of the meet in the 100 metre breaststroke, finishing in a time of 56.10 seconds that was nine hundredths of a second behind the gold medalist and then-world-record-holder in the event Cameron van der Burgh of South Africa to earn the silver medal. In his next individual event, the 200 metre breaststroke, Shymanovich placed twelfth overall with a time of 2:04.85 in the prelims heats, which did not advance him to the final. For his final individual event, the 50 metre breaststroke, Shymanovich once again won the silver medal, placing second with a time of 25.77 seconds only behind Cameron van der Burgh.

=== 2020 Belarus National Championships ===
In December 2020, at the short course Belarus National Championships in Brest, Shymanovich swam a world record time of 55.34 seconds in the 100 metre breaststroke, breaking the world record of 55.41 seconds set by Adam Peaty of Great Britain approximately one month earlier.

=== 2020 European Championships ===
At the 2020 European Aquatics Championships held in Budapest, Hungary in May 2021 and conducted in long course metres, Shymanovich competed in the 50 metre breaststroke winning the silver medal in the event with a time of 26.55 seconds, which was less than four tenths of a second behind the gold medalist in the event, Adam Peaty of Great Britain.

=== 2021 European Short Course Championships ===
2021 European Championships (SC)
Gold medal – first place	200 m breaststroke	2:01.73
Gold medal – first place	50 m breaststroke	25.25 (WR)
Silver medal – second place	100 m breaststroke	55.77

Shymanovich won the gold medal and tied the world record of 25.25 seconds in the 50 metre breaststroke, set in 2009 by Cameron van der Burgh of South Africa, on the last day of the 2021 European Short Course Swimming Championships, held at the Palace of Water Sports in Kazan, Russia in November. His time of 25.25 seconds also set a new European record, Belarusian record, and Championships record in the event. He backed up his world record in the 50 metre breaststroke on the finals relay in the mixed 4x50 metre medley relay, where he swam the fastest 50 metre breaststroke relay split in history with a time of 24.72 seconds and helped the relay place fifth overall.

Earlier in the Championships meet and leading up to his world record, Shymanovich set a new Championships record in the 100 metre breaststroke in the semifinals with a time of 55.45 seconds that advanced him to the final ranked first. In the final of the 100 metre breaststroke he swam a 55.77 and earned the silver medal in the event, with neither him nor the gold medalist, Nicolò Martinenghi of Italy, matching nor surpassing his time from the semifinals in the final, meaning his Championships record remained unbroken through the Championships. After his silver medal win in the 100 metre breaststroke and before his gold medal win in the 50 metre breaststroke, Shymanovich won his first gold medal of the Championships in the 200 metre breaststroke with a time of 2:01.73 in the final. Shymanovich equalling the world record in the 50 metre breaststroke was ranked as number one for "The Week That Was" honor from Swimming World for the week of 8 November 2021 along with Szebasztián Szabó of Hungary equalling the world record in the 50 metre butterfly.

=== 2021 International Swimming League ===
In his second playoffs season match of the 2021 International Swimming League, Shymanovich lowered the world record he set in the short course 100 metre breaststroke in 2020 at 55.34 seconds to a time of 55.32 seconds. Prior to setting the world record, Shymanovich narrowly outperformed Sarah Sjöström, also swimming representing the Energy Standard Swim Club, to win the match most valuable player, MVP, honour in the first playoffs match of the season. Earlier, during the regular season, Shymanovich won his first match most valuable player honour of the year in the eighth match of the regular season. In the fifth playoffs match, sixteenth match of the whole season, Shymanovhich lowered his own world record in the 100 metre breaststroke with a time of 55.28 seconds. For the sixteenth match he also won match most valuable player honors with a total score of 83.5 points. Shymanovich's new world record was the number one item for "The Week That Was" honour. He won a total of 16 breaststroke events throughout the 2021 season. Shymanovich ranked fifth out of 488 competitors at the end of the 2021 season for the total number of most valuable player points earned by a competitor in the duration of the International Swimming League with 711.5 points. With his world records in the 50 metre and 100 metre breaststroke from 2021, Shymanovich was the only swimmer to set a world record in two or more individual events for the year.

=== 2021 World Short Course Championships ===
2021 World Championships (SC)
Gold medal – first place	100 m breaststroke	55.70 (CR)

Shymanovich entered to compete in the 50 metre, 100 metre, and 200 metre breaststroke individual events at the 2021 World Short Course Championships in Abu Dhabi, United Arab Emirates. In the prelims heats of the 100 metre breaststroke, Shymanovich ranked second overall with a time of 56.20 seconds and qualified for the semifinals later in the day. For the semifinals, Shymanovich ranked third with a 56.54, qualifying for the final the next day. Shymanovich won the gold medal in the final of the 100 metre breaststroke in a Championships record time of 55.70 seconds. With his win, Shymanovich earned his first world title. On the third day of competition, Shymanovich ranked tenth overall in the prelims heats of the 200 metre breaststroke with a 2:04.99 and did not qualify for the final. In the evening, Shymanovich split a 24.93 for the breaststroke leg of the 4×50 metre mixed medley relay in the final, helping achieve a fifth-place finish of 1:37.97. Day five, Shymanovich qualified for the semifinals of the 50 metre breaststroke ranking first in the prelims heats with a time of 25.77 seconds. In the semifinals he ranked first, qualifying for the final with a 25.55. On the sixth and final day, Shymanovich placed fourth in the final of the 50 metre breaststroke with a time of 25.84 seconds.

=== 2022 ===
Towards the beginning of the 2022 season, Shymanovich and all other Belarusians, and Russians, were banned indefinitely from LEN competitions, effective 3 March 2022, and banned from FINA competitions in the time frame of 21 April to 31 December 2022. Gaining international competition experience at the 2022 Russian Solidarity Games instead, an international sporting competition with athletes from multiple sports and multiple countries, he won the gold medal in the short course 50 metre breaststroke at the second swimming portion of the Games, held in November, with a time of 25.94 seconds, which was 0.04 seconds ahead of silver medalist Kirill Prigoda of Russia and 0.09 seconds ahead of bronze medalist Kirill Strelnikov of Russia. Earlier in the competition, he won a silver medal in the 100 metre breaststroke with a time of 56.26 seconds to finish 0.01 seconds behind Danil Semyaninov of Russia.

=== 2023 ===
On 5 April 2023, a back-acting extension of the 2022 bans by then FINA, now World Aquatics, was announced, "The World Aquatics Bureau's decision to not invite athletes and officials from Russia and Belarus to World Aquatics events remains in effect today."

2023 Russian Championships (LC)
Gold medal – first place	100 m breaststroke	58.75
Gold medal – first place	50 m breaststroke	26.73
Silver medal – second place	4×100 m mixed medley	3:46.63
Bronze medal – third place	4×100 m medley	3:35.58

At the 2023 Russian National Championships, held starting 16 April at the Palace of Water Sports in Kazan, Russia, Shymanovich ranked first in the semifinals of the 100 metre breaststroke with a time of 59.35 seconds and qualified for the final on day two. This improved upon his time of 59.70 seconds from the morning preliminaries that qualified him for the semifinals ranking first. On the second evening, he started off with a gold medal-win in the 100 metre breaststroke with a time of 58.75 seconds. Later in the session, he split a 57.94 for the breaststroke leg of the 4×100 metre mixed medley relay, helping the Belarus relay team win the silver medal in a time of 3:46.63.

On the third day, Shymanovich placed 37th in the 50 metre freestyle with a time of 23.43 seconds. Two mornings later, he ranked first in the preliminary heats of the 50 metre breaststroke with a 26.32, qualifying for the semifinals. For the semifinals, he was the only swimmer under 27.00 seconds, qualifying for the final with a time of 26.65 seconds. For his first medal on the sixth and final day, he won a gold medal in the 50 metre breaststroke with a time of 26.73 seconds. For his second, and final, medal, he won a bronze medal in the 4×100 metre medley relay, contributing a time of 58.30 seconds for the breaststroke leg to a final mark of 3:35.58.

== International championships (50 m) ==
Meet	50 breaststroke	100 breaststroke	200 breaststroke	4×100 freestyle	4×100 medley	4×100 mixed medley
Junior level
EJC 2012		30th	19th			—N/a
Senior level
WUG 2015	41st	33rd	29th		16th	—N/a
WC 2015			37th		15th	
WC 2017	8th	16th	24th		8th	
WUG 2017	1st place, gold medalist(s)	1st place, gold medalist(s)	18th	14th	9th	—N/a
EC 2018	8th	10th	22nd		6th	12th
WC 2019	5th	12th	27th		9th	9th
EC 2020	2nd place, silver medalist(s)	4th	20th		6th	6th
OG 2020	—N/a	8th			12th	12th

== International championships (25 m) ==
Meet	50 breaststroke	100 breaststroke	200 breaststroke	4×50 medley	4×100 medley	4×50 mixed medley
EC 2015	9th	18th	8th	3rd place, bronze medalist(s)	—N/a	3rd place, bronze medalist(s)
WC 2016	10th	8th	17th	3rd place, bronze medalist(s)	4th	9th
EC 2017	5th	4th	10th	3rd place, bronze medalist(s)	—N/a	2nd place, silver medalist(s)
WC 2018	2nd place, silver medalist(s)	2nd place, silver medalist(s)	12th	6th	6th	10th
EC 2019	5th	2nd place, silver medalist(s)	6th	3rd place, bronze medalist(s)	—N/a	4th
EC 2021	1st place, gold medalist(s)	2nd place, silver medalist(s)	1st place, gold medalist(s)		—N/a	5th
WC 2021	4th	1st place, gold medalist(s)	10th			5th

== World records ==
=== Short course metres (25 m pool) ===
No.	Event	Time		Meet	Location	Date	Age	Status	Notes	Ref
1	100 m breaststroke	55.34		2020 Belarus National Championships	Brest, Belarus	19 December 2020	26	Former	Former ER, NR	
2	50 m breaststroke	25.25	=	2021 European Short Course Championships	Kazan, Russia	7 November 2021	27	Former	NR, Former ER	
3	100 m breaststroke (2)	55.32		2021 International Swimming League	Eindhoven, Netherlands	19 November 2021	27	Former	Former ER, NR	
4	100 m breaststroke (3)	55.28		2021 International Swimming League	Eindhoven, Netherlands	26 November 2021	27	Current	ER, NR	

Legend: WR – World record; ER – European record; NR – Belarusian record;
Records not set in finals: h – heat; sf – semifinal; r – relay 1st leg; rh – relay heat 1st leg; b – B final; † – en route to final mark; so – swim-off; tt – time trial

== Awards and honours ==
- Swimming World, International Swimming League Swimmer of the Year (male): 2021
- SwimSwam, Top 100 (Men's): 2022 (#18)
- International Swimming League, Match Most Valuable Player: 2021 Match 8, 2021 Match 12, 2021 Match 16
- Swimming World, The Week That Was: 8 November 2021 (#1), 29 November 2021 (#1)

== See also ==
- List of World Swimming Championships (25 m) medalists (men)
- List of European Aquatics Championships medalists in swimming (men)
- List of European Short Course Swimming Championships medalists (men)

Records
Preceded by (South Africa) Cameron van der Burgh	Men's 50-metre breaststroke world record holder (short course); 7 November 2021 – 27 December 2021 with Cameron van der Burgh	Succeeded by (Turkey) Emre Sakçı
Preceded by (United Kingdom) Adam Peaty	Men's 100-metre breaststroke world record holder (short course); 19 December 2020 – present	Succeeded by Incumbent
