= Kirill Prigoda =

Russian swimmer (born 1995)

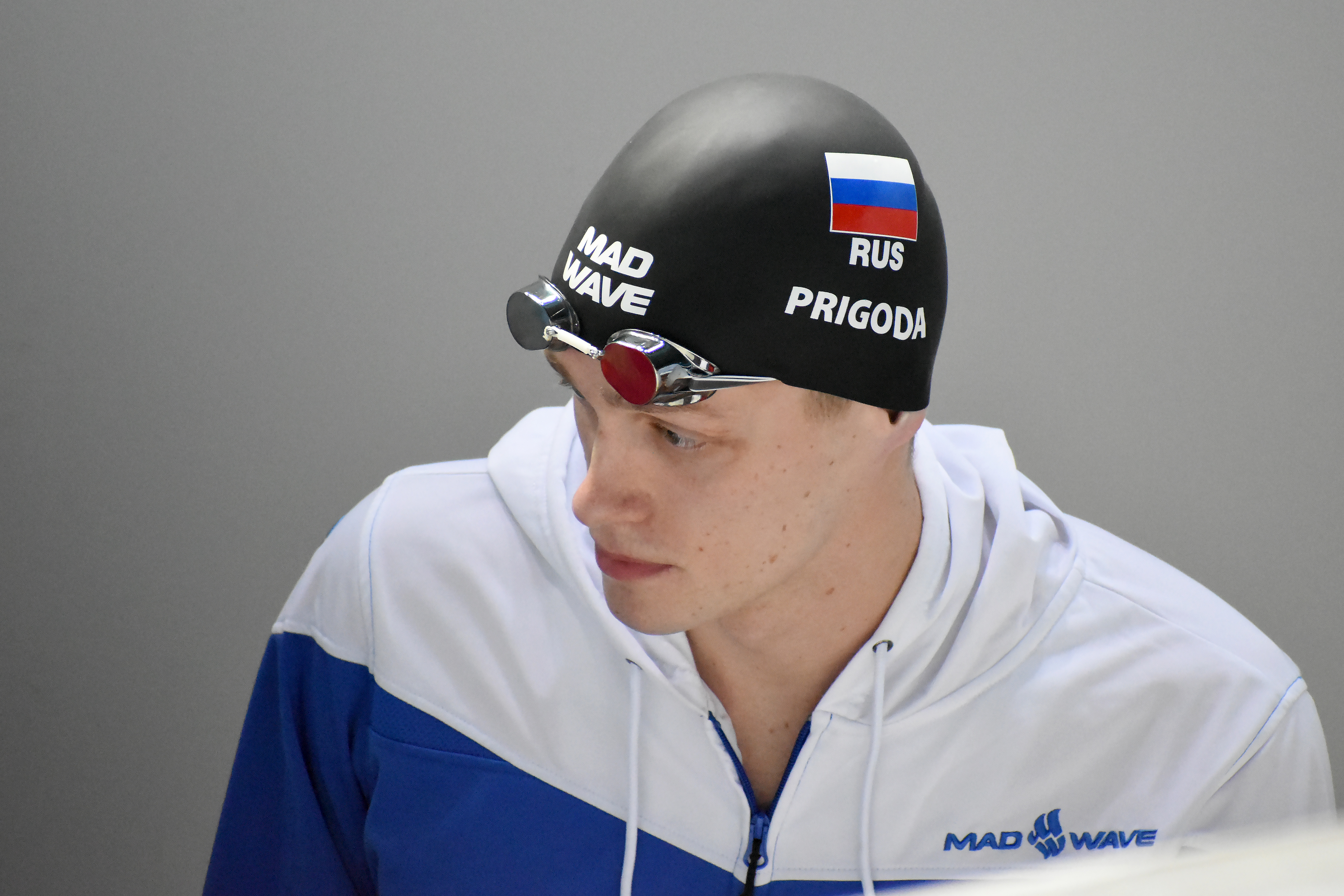

Personal information
- Native name: Кирилл Геннадьевич Пригода
- Full name: Kirill Gennadievich Prigoda
- Nationality: Russian
- Born: 29 December 1995 (age 30) Saint Petersburg, Russia
- Height: 1.92 m (6 ft 4 in)
- Weight: 88 kg (194 lb)

Sport
- Sport: Swimming
- Strokes: Breaststroke
- Club: Ekran Aquatics Sports School of Olympic Reserve
Medal record
Men's swimming
Representing Neutral Athletes B
World Championships (LC)
| Gold medal – first place | 2025 Singapore | 4×100 m medley |
| Gold medal – first place | 2025 Singapore | 4×100 m mixed medley |
| Silver medal – second place | 2025 Singapore | 50 m breaststroke |
World Championships (SC)
| Gold medal – first place | 2024 Budapest | 4×100 m medley |
| Gold medal – first place | 2024 Budapest | 4×50 m mixed medley |
| Gold medal – first place | 2024 Budapest | 4×100 m mixed medley |
| Silver medal – second place | 2024 Budapest | 50 m breaststroke |
| Silver medal – second place | 2024 Budapest | 100 m breaststroke |
| Silver medal – second place | 2024 Budapest | 200 m breaststroke |
European Championships (LC)
| Gold medal – first place | 2026 Paris | 4×100 m medley |
| Bronze medal – third place | 2026 Paris | 4×100 m mixed medley |
Representing Russia
World Championships (LC)
| Bronze medal – third place | 2017 Budapest | 100 m breaststroke |
| Bronze medal – third place | 2017 Budapest | 4×100 m medley |
| Bronze medal – third place | 2019 Gwangju | 4×100 m medley |
World Championships (SC)
| Gold medal – first place | 2016 Windsor | 4×50 m freestyle |
| Gold medal – first place | 2016 Windsor | 4×50 m medley |
| Gold medal – first place | 2016 Windsor | 4×100 m medley |
| Gold medal – first place | 2018 Hangzhou | 200 m breaststroke |
| Gold medal – first place | 2018 Hangzhou | 4×50 m medley |
| Silver medal – second place | 2018 Hangzhou | 4×100 m medley |
| Bronze medal – third place | 2014 Doha | 200 m breaststroke |
European Championships (LC)
| Silver medal – second place | 2018 Glasgow | 4×100 m medley |
| Silver medal – second place | 2020 Budapest | 4×100 m medley |
European Championships (SC)
| Gold medal – first place | 2017 Copenhagen | 200 m breaststroke |
| Gold medal – first place | 2017 Copenhagen | 4×50 m medley |
| Silver medal – second place | 2017 Copenhagen | 50 m breaststroke |
| Bronze medal – third place | 2017 Copenhagen | 100 m breaststroke |
Summer Universiade
| Gold medal – first place | 2015 Gwangju | 4×100 m medley |
| Gold medal – first place | 2019 Naples | 50 m breaststroke |
| Gold medal – first place | 2019 Naples | 200 m breaststroke |
| Silver medal – second place | 2019 Naples | 100 m breaststroke |
| Silver medal – second place | 2019 Naples | 4×100 m medley |

Kirill Gennadievich Prigoda (Russian: Кирилл Геннадьевич Пригода; born 29 December 1995) is a Russian swimmer. He competed in the men's 100 metre breaststroke event at the 2016 Summer Olympics.

== Personal life ==
Prigoda's father, Gennadiy Prigoda, was a four-time Olympic medalist in swimming, and his mother, Yelena Volkova, was world champion in 200 m breaststroke. Prigoda is alumni at the SPbPU in the chair of "Strategic Management".
