= Caspar Corbeau =

Dutch-American swimmer (born 2001)

Personal information
- National team: Netherlands
- Born: 3 April 2001 (age 25) Santa Cruz, California, U.S.
- Height: 2.01 m (6 ft 7 in)
- Weight: 95 kg (209 lb)

Sport
- Sport: Swimming
- Strokes: Breaststroke
- College team: Texas Longhorns
- Coach: Eddie Reese
Medal record
Men's swimming
Representing the Netherlands
Event	1st	2nd	3rd
Olympic Games	0	0	1
World Championships (LC)	0	2	1
European Championships (LC)	0	2	0
European Championships (SC)	1	1	0
European Youth Olympic Festival	1	1	0
European Junior Championships	0	2	2
Total	2	8	4
Olympic Games
Bronze medal – third place	2024 Paris	200 m breaststroke
World Championships (LC)
Silver medal – second place	2024 Doha	200 m breaststroke
Silver medal – second place	2024 Doha	4×100 m medley
Bronze medal – third place	2025 Singapore	200 m breaststroke
European Championships (LC)
Silver medal – second place	2026 Paris	4×100 m mixed medley
Silver medal – second place	2026 Paris	200 m breaststroke
European Championships (SC)
Gold medal – first place	2025 Lublin	100 m breaststroke
Silver medal – second place	2025 Lublin	200 m breaststroke
European Youth Olympic Festival
Gold medal – first place	2017 Győr	200 m breaststroke
Silver medal – second place	2017 Győr	100 m breaststroke
European Junior Championships
Silver medal – second place	2019 Kazan	100 m breaststroke
Silver medal – second place	2019 Kazan	200 m breaststroke
Bronze medal – third place	2018 Helsinki	200 m breaststroke
Bronze medal – third place	2019 Kazan	50 m breaststroke

Caspar Corbeau (born 3 April 2001) is a Dutch-American swimmer, representing the Netherlands at international competitions. He is a 2024 Olympics bronze medalist in the men's 200 meter breaststroke.

== Early life ==
Corbeau was born in Santa Cruz, California, and raised in the Portland, Oregon area. His father, Jim Corbeau, and his mother, Shannon Hocom Corbeau, were competitive swimmers for Aptos High School in Santa Cruz, and later UC Berkeley and UCLA swim teams, respectively. Their three children, Caspar, Angus and Nicolien, are also competitive swimmers.

Corbeau started swimming at the age of eight. From 2010 to 2019 he swam for the Tualatin Hills Swim Club in Tualatin, Oregon, where he was coached by Christopher Pfaffenroth. Corbeau attended Sunset High School in Beaverton, Oregon and graduated in 2019.

== Career ==
=== Collegiate ===
From 2019 to 2023, Corbeau attended the University of Texas at Austin, where he majored in kinesiology. At Texas, he was coached by Hall of Famer Eddie Reese, and was a member of the 2021 NCAA National Championship and 2022 NCAA National Runner-up teams. Corbeau was an 22-time All-American, 16-time Big 12 Champion (Seven-time Individual Champion), 2020 Big 12 Newcomer of the Year; and College Swimming Coaches Association of America (CSCAA) Scholar All-American First Team for all four years at Texas.

In 2024, it was announced that Corbeau will join the Indiana University swim team as a mid-year graduate student in Spring 2025.

=== Olympic Games ===
He competed at the 2020 Olympic Games in Tokyo, Japan in the 100 meter and 200 meter breaststroke.

At the 2024 Olympic Games in Paris, France, Corbeau competed in the 100 meter and 200 meter breaststroke. He finished 8th in the 100 meter distance. In the 200 meter race, Corbeau finished third with a time of 2:07.90, and earned a bronze medal.

=== European Championships ===
At the 2021 European Championships (long course) in Budapest, Hungary he competed in the 100 meter and 200 meter breaststroke, finishing 7th in the 200 meter distance.

At the 2023 European Championships (short course) in Otopeni, Romania he competed in the 100 meter and 200 meter breaststroke, finishing 3rd in the 100 meter distance and 1st in the 200 meter distance.

At the 2025 European Championships (short course) in Lublin, Poland, he completed he competed in the 100 meter and 200 meter breaststroke, finishing 1st in the 100 meter distance and 2nd in the 200 meter distance.

=== World Championships ===
At the 2022 World Championships (long course) in Budapest, Hungary he competed in the 100 meter and 200 meter breaststroke, finishing 7th in the 200 meter distance.

At the 2023 World Championships (long course) in Fukuoka, Japan he competed in the 100 meter and 200 meter breaststroke, finishing 5th in the 200 meter distance.

At the 2024 World Championships (long course) in Doha, Corbeau competed in the 100 meter and 200 meter breaststroke. He won a silver medal in the 200 meter race, and finished seventh in the 100 meter distance.

At the 2025 World Championships (long course) in Singapore, Corbeau competed in the 100 meter and 200 meter breaststroke. He won a bronze medal in the 200 meter race, and finished fourth in the 100 meter distance.

=== World Record ===
At the third stop of the 2025 World Aquatics World Cup series, held in Toronto, Canada in October 2025, he became the first man to break the 2:00 barrier in the 200 meter breaststroke, swimming a 1:59.52.

== Personal bests ==
As of 25 November 2025

Long Course Meters
Event	Time	Meet	Date	Note(s)
50 m breaststroke	26.94	2025 World Championships	29 July 2025	
100 m breaststroke	59.03	2025 World Championships	28 July 2025	
200 m breaststroke	2:07.73	2025 World Championships	1 August 2025	

Short Course Meters
Event	Time	Meet	Date	Note(s)
50 m breaststroke	25.52	World Cup - Westmont	19 October 2025	
100 m breaststroke	55.54	2025 European Championships	2 December 2025	
200 m breaststroke	1:59.52	World Cup - Toronto	26 October 2025	

Short Course Yards
Event	Time	Meet	Date	Note(s)
100 y breaststroke	50.49	2022 NCAA Championships	25 March 2022	
200 y breaststroke	1:49.15	2023 NCAA Championships	25 March 2023	
200 y IM	1:40.98	2022 NCAA Championships	24 March 2022	
