= Antoine Viquerat =

French swimmer

Personal information
- Nationality: French
- Born: 5 October 1998 (age 28)
- Height: 1.90 m (6 ft 3 in)

Sport
- Sport: Swimming
Medal record
Men's swimming
Representing France
European Championships (LC)
| Silver medal – second place | 2022 Rome | 4×100 m medley |

Antoine Viquerat (born 5 October 1998) is a Swiss swimmer. He competed in the men's 200 meter breaststroke at the 2020 Summer Olympics.
