= Berkay Ömer Öğretir =

Turkish swimmer (born 1998)

Berkay Öğretir
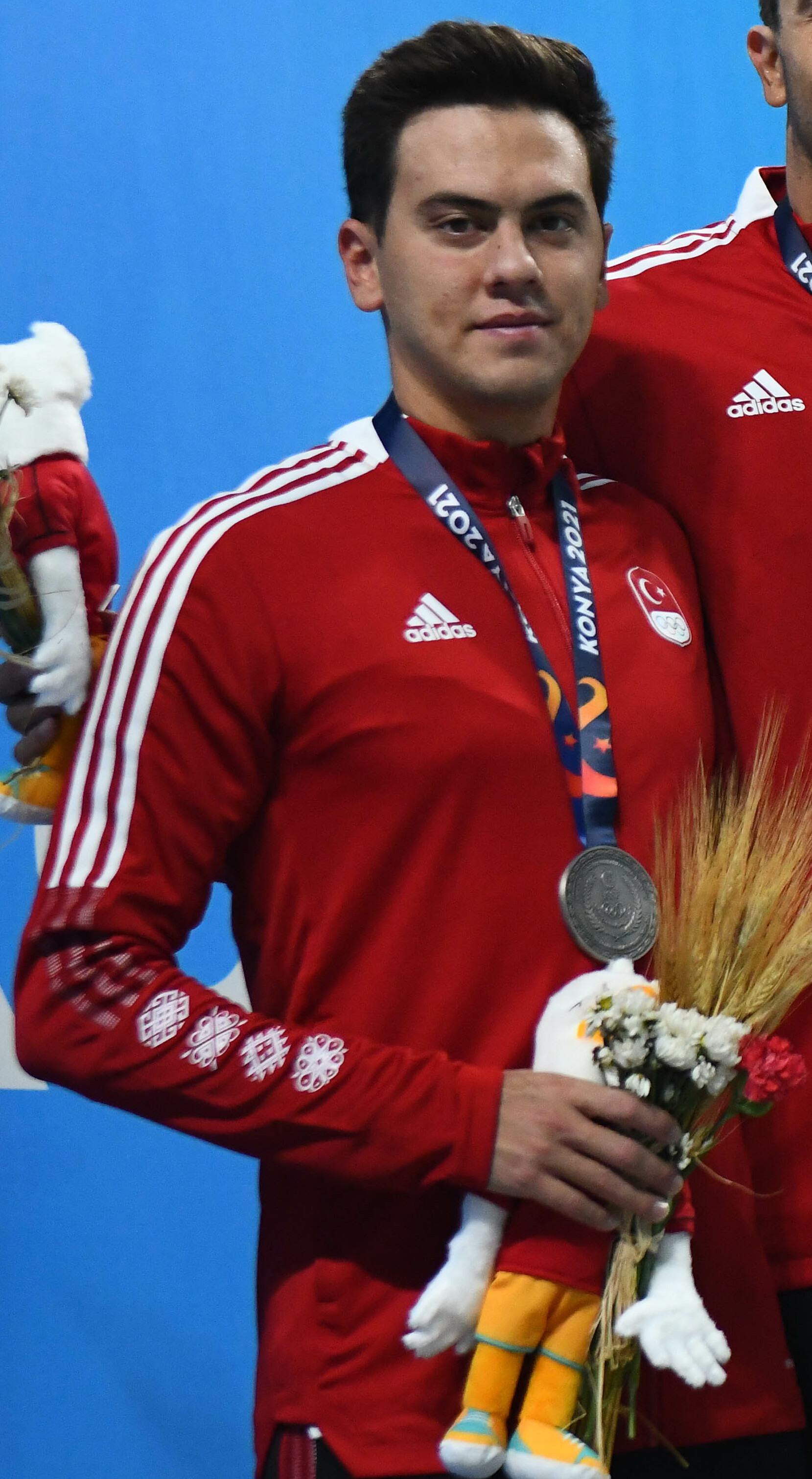
- Öğretir in 2022

Personal information
- Full name: Berkay Ömer Öğretir
- Nationality: Turkish
- Born: 16 February 1998 (age 28) Bursa, Turkey
- Spouse: Ecem Dönmez (m. 2024)

Sport
- Sport: Swimming
- Club: Galatasaray Swimming
Medal record
Men's swimming
Representing Turkey
European Championships (LC)
Silver medal – second place	2024 Belgrade	100 m breaststroke
Mediterranean Games
Gold medal – first place	2022 Oran	200 m breaststroke
Gold medal – first place	2022 Oran	100 m breaststroke
Bronze medal – third place	2018 Tarragona	100 m breaststroke
Bronze medal – third place	2018 Tarragona	4x100 m medley relay
Bronze medal – third place	2022 Oran	4×100 m medley relay
Islamic Solidarity Games
Gold medal – first place	2021 Konya	200 m breaststroke
Silver medal – second place	2021 Konya	50 m breaststroke
Silver medal – second place	2021 Konya	100 m breaststroke
Silver medal – second place	2021 Konya	4x100 m medley relay

Berkay Ömer Öğretir (born 16 February 1998) is a Turkish swimmer. He qualified for the 2024 Olympics in Paris, France.

== Sport career ==
He competed in the men's 200 metre breaststroke event at the 2018 FINA World Swimming Championships (25 m), in Hangzhou, China.

He won the silver medal in the 100 m breaststroke event with 59.23 at the 2024 European Aquatics Championships in Belgrade, Serbia on 18 June 2024. He qualified for the 2024 Olympics in Paris, France.

== Personal life ==
Berkay Ömer Öğretir and Ecem Dönmez (born 1998), another Turkish swimmer competing at the 2024 Summer Olympics, married in Paris on 2 August after completing their competitions at the Olympic Games.
