= Austria at the 2025 World Aquatics Championships =

- Flag of Austria
- World Aquatics code: AUT
- National federation: Österreichischer Schwimmverband

in Singapore
- Competitors: 15 in 4 sports
- Medals Ranked 19th: Gold 1 Silver 0 Bronze 0 Total 1

World Aquatics Championships appearances
- 1973; 1975; 1978; 1982; 1986; 1991; 1994; 1998; 2001; 2003; 2005; 2007; 2009; 2011; 2013; 2015; 2017; 2019; 2022; 2023; 2024; 2025

Austria are competing at the 2025 World Aquatics Championships in Singapore from July 11 to August 3, 2025.

== Athletes by discipline ==
The following is the number of competitors who will participate at the Championships per discipline.

Sport	Men	Women	Total
Artistic swimming	0	3	3
Diving	2	0	2
Open water swimming	1	0	1
Swimming	6	1	7
Total	9	4	13

== Medalists ==
Medal	Name	Sport	Event	Date
1st place, gold medalist(s)	Anna-Maria Alexandri; Eirini-Marina Alexandri	Artistic swimming	Duet technical routine	21 July 2025

== Artistic swimming ==
Women

Athlete	Event	Preliminaries		Final	
Athlete	Event	Points	Rank	Points	Rank
Vasiliki Alexandri	Solo technical routine	250.9533	4 Q	253.4817	4
Vasiliki Alexandri	Solo free routine	229.8163	5 Q	238.9976	4
Anna-Maria Alexandri; Eirini-Marina Alexandri	Duet technical routine	305.1684	1 Q	307.1451	1st place, gold medalist(s)

== Diving ==
Men

Athlete	Event	Preliminaries		Semi-finals		Final	
Athlete	Event	Points	Rank	Points	Rank	Points	Rank
Anton Knoll	10 m platform	361.50	23	Did not advance			
Dariush Lotfi	3 m springboard	347.25	33	Did not advance			
Dariush Lotfi	10 m platform	345.65	31	Did not advance			
Anton Knoll; Dariush Lotfi	10 m synchronized platform	319.68	17	—		Did not advance	

== Open water swimming ==
Men

Athlete	Event	Heats		Semifinal		Final	
Athlete	Event	Time	Rank	Time	Rank	Time	Rank
Luca Karl	3 km knockout sprints	17:08.7	10 Q	11:33.2	12	Did not advance	
Luca Karl	5 km	—				57:42.0	8
Luca Karl	10 km	—				2:00:30.4	5

== Swimming ==
Men

Athlete	Event	Heat		Semi-final		Final	
Athlete	Event	Time	Rank	Time	Rank	Time	Rank
Simon Bucher	Men's 50 m butterfly	23.20	10 Q	22.95 NR	10	Did not advance	
Simon Bucher	100 m butterfly	51.16 NR	6 Q	50.88 NR	8 Q	50.92	7
Martin Espernberger	200 m butterfly	1:55.45	10 Q	1:55.18	9	Did not advance	
Heiko Gigler	50 m freestyle	22.12	27	Did not advance			
Heiko Gigler	100 m freestyle	49.05	32	Did not advance			
Luka Mladenovic	50 m breaststroke	27.20	16 Q	26.93; 26.97	8 S/off; 1 Q	26.89	8
Luka Mladenovic	200 m breaststroke	2:12.03	21	Did not advance			
Bernhard Reitshammer	50 m backstroke	25.70	42	Did not advance			
Bernhard Reitshammer	50 m breaststroke	27.53	31	Did not advance			
Bernhard Reitshammer	100 m breaststroke	1:01.09	30	Did not advance			
Noah Zemansky	400 m individual medley	4:18.89	18	—		Did not advance	
Bernhard Reitshammer; Luka Mladenovic; Simon Bucher; Heiko Gigler	4 × 100 m medley relay	3:32.91	12	—		Did not advance	

Women

Athlete	Event	Heat		Semi-final		Final	
Athlete	Event	Time	Rank	Time	Rank	Time	Rank
Iris Julia Berger	50 m freestyle	25.50	28	Did not advance			
Iris Julia Berger	100 m freestyle	54.73	24	Did not advance			
Iris Julia Berger	200 m freestyle	1:58.54	17	Did not advance			
Iris Julia Berger	50 m butterfly	26.39	24	Did not advance			
Iris Julia Berger	100 m butterfly	58.91	23	Did not advance			
