= Austria at the 2023 World Aquatics Championships =

- Flag of Austria
- World Aquatics code: AUT
- National federation: Österreichischer Schwimmverband
- Website: www.schwimmverband.at

in Fukuoka, Japan
- Competitors: 20 in 4 sports
- Medals Ranked 16th: Gold 1 Silver 2 Bronze 0 Total 3

World Aquatics Championships appearances
- 1973; 1975; 1978; 1982; 1986; 1991; 1994; 1998; 2001; 2003; 2005; 2007; 2009; 2011; 2013; 2015; 2017; 2019; 2022; 2023; 2024; 2025

Austria competed at the 2023 World Aquatics Championships in Fukuoka, Japan from 14 to 30 July.

== Medalists ==
Medal	Name	Sport	Event	Date
1st place, gold medalist(s)	Anna-Maria Alexandri; Eirini-Marina Alexandri	Artistic swimming	Women's duet free routine	20 July 2023
2nd place, silver medalist(s)	Vasiliki Alexandri	Artistic swimming	Women's solo technical routine	15 July 2023
2nd place, silver medalist(s)	Vasiliki Alexandri	Artistic swimming	Women's solo free routine	19 July 2023

== Artistic swimming ==
Women

Athlete	Event	Preliminaries		Final	
Athlete	Event	Points	Rank	Points	Rank
Vasiliki Alexandri	Solo technical routine	232.8367	3 Q	264.4200	2nd place, silver medalist(s)
Vasiliki Alexandri	Solo free routine	179.2834	6 Q	229.3251	2nd place, silver medalist(s)
Anna-Maria Alexandri; Eirini-Marina Alexandri	Duet technical routine	275.3233	2 Q	240.5117	5
Anna-Maria Alexandri; Eirini-Marina Alexandri	Duet free routine	251.4313	1 Q	255.4583	1st place, gold medalist(s)

== Diving ==
Austria entered 4 divers.

Men

Athlete	Event	Preliminaries		Semifinals		Final	
Athlete	Event	Points	Rank	Points	Rank	Points	Rank
Alexander Hart	3 m springboard	363.95	27	Did not advance			
Anton Knoll	10 m platform	389.10	15 Q	375.50	17	Did not advance	
Dariush Lotfi	1 m springboard	327.15	19	—N/a		Did not advance	
Dariush Lotfi	10 m platform	323.10	33	Did not advance			
Nikolaj Schaller	1 m springboard	297.00	32	—N/a		Did not advance	
Nikolaj Schaller	3 m springboard	358.50	32	Did not advance			
Alexander Hart; Nikolaj Schaller	3 m synchro springboard	341.16	13	—N/a		Did not advance	
Anton Knoll; Dariush Lotfi	10 m synchro platform	354.75	11 Q	—N/a		347.61	11

== Open water swimming ==
Austria entered 1 open water swimmer.

Men

Athlete	Event	Time	Rank
Jan Hercog	Men's 5 km	56:52.0	21
Jan Hercog	Men's 10 km	1:54:02.2	17

== Swimming ==
Austria entered 12 swimmers.

Men

Athlete	Event	Heat		Semifinal		Final	
Athlete	Event	Time	Rank	Time	Rank	Time	Rank
Felix Auböck	200 metre freestyle	1:46.48	10 Q	1:45.97; 1:46.30	8 S/off; 1 Q	1:46.40	8
Felix Auböck	400 metre freestyle	3:44.14	2 Q	—N/a		3:44.43	8
Felix Auböck	800 metre freestyle	Did not start		—N/a		Did not advance	
Valentin Bayer	50 metre breaststroke	27.36	16 Q	27.45	14	Did not advance	
Valentin Bayer	100 metre breaststroke	1:00.51	18	Did not advance			
Simon Bucher	50 metre butterfly	23.32	13 Q	23.05 NR; 23.10	8 S/off; 1 Q	23.26	7
Simon Bucher	100 metre butterfly	52.27	26	Did not advance			
Heiko Gigler	50 metre freestyle	22.46	36	Did not advance			
Heiko Gigler	100 metre freestyle	49.20	36	Did not advance			
Martin Espernberger	200 metre butterfly	1:57.36	20	Did not advance			
Bernhard Reitshammer	100 metre backstroke	Did not start					
Bernhard Reitshammer	50 metre breaststroke	27.11	9 Q	27.25	11	Did not advance	
Bernhard Reitshammer	100 metre breaststroke	1:00.20	15 Q	1:00.67	16	Did not advance	
Bernhard Reitshammer	200 metre individual medley	2:01.42	24	Did not advance			
Christopher Rothbauer	200 metre breaststroke	2:12.29	19	Did not advance			
Bernhard Reitshammer; Valentin Bayer; Simon Bucher; Heiko Gigler	4 × 100 m medley relay	3:34.58	11	—N/a		Did not advance	

Women

Athlete	Event	Heat		Semifinal		Final	
Athlete	Event	Time	Rank	Time	Rank	Time	Rank
Lena Grabowski	200 metre backstroke	2:12.79	20	Did not advance			
Marlene Kahler	400 metre freestyle	4:13.13	25	—N/a		Did not advance	
Cornelia Pammer	200 metre freestyle	2:01.66	36	Did not advance			
Lena Kreundl; Marlene Kahler; Cornelia Pammer; Lena Opatril	4 × 200 m freestyle relay	8:05.77	16	—N/a		Did not advance	
