= Austria at the 2022 World Aquatics Championships =

- Flag of Austria
- World Aquatics code: AUT
- National federation: Österreichischer Schwimmverband
- Website: www.schwimmverband.at

in Budapest, Hungary
- Competitors: 16 in 4 sports
- Medals Ranked 21st: Gold 0 Silver 0 Bronze 2 Total 2

World Aquatics Championships appearances
- 1973; 1975; 1978; 1982; 1986; 1991; 1994; 1998; 2001; 2003; 2005; 2007; 2009; 2011; 2013; 2015; 2017; 2019; 2022; 2023; 2024; 2025

Austria competed at the 2022 World Aquatics Championships in Budapest, Hungary from 18 June to 3 July.

== Medalists ==
Medal	Name	Sport	Event	Date
Bronze	Anna-Maria Alexandri; Eirini Alexandri	Artistic swimming	Duet technical routine	19 June
Bronze	Anna-Maria Alexandri; Eirini Alexandri	Artistic swimming	Duet free routine	23 June

== Artistic swimming ==
Women

Athlete	Event	Preliminaries		Final	
Athlete	Event	Points	Rank	Points	Rank
Vasiliki Alexandri	Solo technical routine	87.9133	5 Q	88.9841	5
Vasiliki Alexandri	Solo free routine	89.5667	5 Q	90.1333	5
Anna-Maria Alexandri; Eirini Alexandri	Duet technical routine	90.2869	3 Q	91.2622	3rd place, bronze medalist(s)
Anna-Maria Alexandri; Eirini Alexandri	Duet free routine	92.0667	3 Q	92.8000	3rd place, bronze medalist(s)

== Diving ==
Men

Athlete	Event	Preliminaries		Semifinals		Final	
Athlete	Event	Points	Rank	Points	Rank	Points	Rank
Alex Hart	3 m springboard	371,9	14 Q	325,4	17	did not advance	
Anton Knoll	10 m platform	301,1	32	did not advance			
Dariush Lotfi	1 m springboard	315,4	28	—N/a		did not advance	
Dariush Lotfi	3 m springboard	274,2	47	did not advance			
Nikolaj Schaller	1 m springboard	253	43	—N/a		did not advance	
Alex Hart; Nikolaj Schaller	3 m synchronized springboard	DNS					
Anton Knoll; Dariush Lotfi	10 m synchronized platform	314,52	11 Q	—N/a		316,2	12

== Open water swimming ==
Men

Athlete	Event	Time	Rank
Jan Hercog	Men's 5 km	56:28.7	23
Jan Hercog	Men's 10 km	1:53:07.9	9

== Swimming ==
Men

Athlete	Event	Heat		Semifinal		Final	
Athlete	Event	Time	Rank	Time	Rank	Time	Rank
Felix Auböck	200 m freestyle	1:45.84	3 Q	1:45.17	2 Q	1:45.11	5
Felix Auböck	400 m freestyle	3:43.83	1 Q	—N/a		3:43.58	4
Felix Auböck	800 m freestyle	DNS					
Simon Bucher	50 m butterfly	23.51	14 Q	23.18	11	did not advance	
Simon Bucher	100 m butterfly	51.18 NR	4 Q	51.22	5 Q	51.28	6
Heiko Gigler	50 m freestyle	22.48	28	did not advance			
Heiko Gigler	100 m freestyle	49.29	29	did not advance			
Bernhard Reitshammer	100 m backstroke	DNS					
Bernhard Reitshammer	50 m breaststroke	27.12	6 Q	27.11	7 Q		
Bernhard Reitshammer	100 m breaststroke	1:00.66	15 Q	1:00.03	12	did not advance	
Bernhard Reitshammer	200 m individual medley	DNS					
Christopher Rothbauer	200 m breaststroke	DSQ		did not advance			

Women

Athlete	Event	Heat		Semifinal		Final	
Athlete	Event	Time	Rank	Time	Rank	Time	Rank
Marlene Kahler	200 m freestyle	2:00.75	21	did not advance			
Marlene Kahler	400 m freestyle	4:12.55	17	—N/a		did not advance	
Marlene Kahler	1500 m freestyle	DNS					
Lena Kreundl	50 m breaststroke	32.17	32	did not advance			
Lena Kreundl	100 m breaststroke	1:11.24	37	did not advance			
Lena Kreundl	200 m individual medley	2:15.31	21	did not advance			
Caroline Pilhatsch	50 m backstroke	28.54	19	did not advance			
