= Austria at the 2024 World Aquatics Championships =

- Flag of Austria
- FINA code: AUT
- National federation: Österreichischer Schwimmverband
- Website: www.schwimmverband.at

in Doha, Qatar
- Competitors: 16 in 4 sports
- Medals Ranked 26th: Gold 0 Silver 1 Bronze 1 Total 2

World Aquatics Championships appearances
- 1973; 1975; 1978; 1982; 1986; 1991; 1994; 1998; 2001; 2003; 2005; 2007; 2009; 2011; 2013; 2015; 2017; 2019; 2022; 2023; 2024

Austria competed at the 2024 World Aquatics Championships in Doha, Qatar from 2 to 18 February.

== Medalists ==
Medal	Name	Sport	Event	Date
2nd place, silver medalist(s)	Simon Bucher	Swimming	Men's 100 metre butterfly	17 February 2024
3rd place, bronze medalist(s)	Martin Espernberger	Swimming	Men's 200 metre butterfly	14 February 2024

== Competitors ==
The following is the list of competitors in the Championships.

Sport	Men	Women	Total
Artistic swimming	0	1	1
Diving	4	0	4
Open water swimming	1	0	1
Swimming	6	4	10
Total	11	5	16

== Artistic swimming ==
Women

Athlete	Event	Preliminaries		Final	
Athlete	Event	Points	Rank	Points	Rank
Vasiliki Alexandri	Solo technical routine	264.5967	2 Q	234.4984	6
Vasiliki Alexandri	Solo free routine	253.8625	1 Q	222.8938	6

== Diving ==
Men

Athlete	Event	Preliminaries		Semifinals		Final	
Athlete	Event	Points	Rank	Points	Rank	Points	Rank
Alexander Hart	3 m springboard	321.85	42	Did not advance			
Anton Knoll	10 m platform	368.00	17 Q	320.95	17	Did not advance	
Dariush Lotfi	1 m springboard	292.30	22	—		Did not advance	
Dariush Lotfi	10 m platform	290.15	36	Did not advance			
Nikolaj Schaller	3 m springboard	341.55	30	Did not advance			
Alexander Hart; Nikolaj Schaller	3 m synchro springboard	—				275.91	23
Anton Knoll; Dariush Lotfi	10 m synchro platform	—				310.38	17

== Open water swimming ==
Men

Athlete	Event	Time	Rank
Jan Hercog	Men's 5 km	53:24.0	25
Jan Hercog	Men's 10 km	1:48:58.7	16

== Swimming ==
Austria entered 10 swimmers.

Men

Athlete	Event	Heat		Semifinal		Final	
Athlete	Event	Time	Rank	Time	Rank	Time	Rank
Felix Auböck	200 metre freestyle	1:47.30	15 Q	1:48.03	16	Did not advance	
Felix Auböck	400 metre freestyle	3:45.53	5 Q	—		3:51.60	8
Felix Auböck	800 metre freestyle	7:57.63	26	—		Did not advance	
Simon Bucher	50 metre butterfly	23.53; 23.54	16 S/off; 2	Did not advance			
Simon Bucher	100 metre butterfly	51.42	1 Q	51.39	3 Q	51.28	2nd place, silver medalist(s)
Martin Espernberger	200 metre butterfly	1:56.26	4 Q	1:55.40	4 Q	1:55.16	3rd place, bronze medalist(s)
Heiko Gigler	50 metre freestyle	22.28	29	Did not advance			
Heiko Gigler	100 metre freestyle	49.16	22	Did not advance			
Bernhard Reitshammer	50 metre breaststroke	26.33	31	Did not advance			
Bernhard Reitshammer	100 metre backstroke	55.44	26	Did not advance			
Bernhard Reitshammer	50 metre breaststroke	27.47	14 Q	27.25	14	Did not advance	
Bernhard Reitshammer	100 metre breaststroke	1:00.50	18	Did not advance			
Bernhard Reitshammer; Valentin Bayer; Simon Bucher; Heiko Gigler	4 × 100 m medley relay	3:34.29	7 Q	—		3:34.62	6

Women

Athlete	Event	Heat		Semifinal		Final	
Athlete	Event	Time	Rank	Time	Rank	Time	Rank
Iris Julia Berger	200 metre freestyle	2:00.20	22	Did not advance			
Marlene Kahler	800 metre freestyle	Did not start					
Lena Kreundl	200 metre individual medley	2:14.03	11 Q	2:13.72	13	Did not advance	
Iris Julia Berger; Marlene Kahler; Lena Opatril; Lena Kreundl	4 × 200 m freestyle relay	8:06.00	13	—		Did not advance	
