= Austria at the 2015 World Aquatics Championships =

- Flag of Austria
- FINA code: AUT
- National federation: Österreichischer Schwimmverband
- Website: www.osv.or.at

in Kazan, Russia
- Competitors: 15 in 4 sports
- Medals: Gold 0 Silver 0 Bronze 0 Total 0

World Aquatics Championships appearances
- 1973; 1975; 1978; 1982; 1986; 1991; 1994; 1998; 2001; 2003; 2005; 2007; 2009; 2011; 2013; 2015; 2017; 2019; 2022; 2023; 2024

Austria competed at the 2015 World Aquatics Championships in Kazan, Russia from 24 July to 9 August 2015.

== Diving ==
Austrian divers qualified for the individual spots at the World Championships.

Men

Athlete	Event	Preliminaries		Semifinals		Final	
Athlete	Event	Points	Rank	Points	Rank	Points	Rank
Constantin Blaha	1 m springboard	383.30	6 Q	—		404.40	8
Constantin Blaha	3 m springboard	421.65	15 Q	407.20	17	did not advance	

== Open water swimming ==
Austria has qualified one swimmer compete in the open water marathon.

Athlete	Event	Time	Rank
Matthias Schweinzer	Men's 10 km	1:52:57.5	38

== Swimming ==
Austrian swimmers have achieved qualifying standards in the following events (up to a maximum of 2 swimmers in each event at the A-standard entry time, and 1 at the B-standard):

Men

Athlete	Event	Heat		Semifinal		Final	
Athlete	Event	Time	Rank	Time	Rank	Time	Rank
Felix Auböck	200 m freestyle	1:48.75	29	did not advance			
Felix Auböck	400 m freestyle	3:50.04	20	—		did not advance	
Felix Auböck	1500 m freestyle	15:45.69	37	—		did not advance	
David Brandl	400 m freestyle	3:51.83	33	—		did not advance	
Jakub Maly	200 m individual medley	2:01.68	21	did not advance			
Jakub Maly	400 m individual medley	4:19.20	20	—		did not advance	
Christian Scherübl	100 m freestyle	51.02	57	did not advance			
Felix Auböck; David Brandl; Sebastian Steffan; Christian Scherübl	4×200 m freestyle relay	7:18.97	17	—		did not advance	

Women

Athlete	Event	Heat		Semifinal		Final	
Athlete	Event	Time	Rank	Time	Rank	Time	Rank
Claudia Hufnagl	400 m freestyle	4:17.14	29	—		did not advance	
Claudia Hufnagl	200 m butterfly	2:15.16	30	did not advance			
Birgit Koschischek	50 m freestyle	25.61	32	did not advance			
Birgit Koschischek	100 m freestyle	56.40	=39	did not advance			
Lena Kreundl	50 m breaststroke	31.83	29	did not advance			
Jördis Steinegger	100 m backstroke	1:02.99	41	did not advance			
Jördis Steinegger	200 m backstroke	2:15.37	30	did not advance			
Jördis Steinegger	400 m individual medley	4:45.50	22	—		did not advance	
Lisa Zaiser	200 m freestyle	1:59.97	24	did not advance			
Lisa Zaiser	200 m individual medley	2:13.90	19	did not advance			
Birgit Koschischek; Lena Kreundl; Jördis Steinegger; Lisa Zaiser	4×100 m freestyle relay	3:44.06	16	—		did not advance	
Lisa Zaiser; Claudia Hufnagl; Jördis Steinegger; Lena Kreundl	4×200 m freestyle relay	8:05.23	13	—		did not advance	

== Synchronized swimming ==
Austria has qualified three synchronized swimmers for the following events.

Athlete	Event	Preliminaries		Final	
Athlete	Event	Points	Rank	Points	Rank
Nadine Brandl	Solo technical routine	79.4713	14	did not advance	
Nadine Brandl	Solo free routine	82.6667	13	did not advance	
Anna-Maria Alexandri; Eirini Alexandri	Duet technical routine	82.3507	12 Q	83.5146	11
Anna-Maria Alexandri; Eirini Alexandri	Duet free routine	83.9000	13	did not advance	
