= Synchronised swimming at the 1973 World Aquatics Championships – Solo =

Synchronised swimming – Solo routine at the 1973 World Aquatics Championships
- Venue: Tašmajdan Sports and Recreation Center
- Location: Belgrade, Yugoslavia
- Dates: 2 September
- Competitors: 15 from 15 nations
- Winning points: 120.4600

Medalists
gold medal	Teresa Andersen	United States
silver medal	Jojo Carrier	Canada
bronze medal	Junke Hasumi	Japan

The Solo routine competition at the 1973 World Aquatics Championships was held on 2 September 1973.

== Results ==
Green denotes finalists

Rank	Swimmer	Nationality	Preliminary		Final	
Rank	Swimmer	Nationality	Points	Rank	Points	Rank
1st place, gold medalist(s)	Teresa Andersen	United States	73.4600	1	120.4600	1
2nd place, silver medalist(s)	Jojo Carrier	Canada	66.5340	2	112.5340	2
3rd place, bronze medalist(s)	Junke Hasumi	Japan	64.8300	3	104.1800	3
4	Liesbeth Wouda	Netherlands	60.2110	4	97.7110	4
5	Françoise Schuler	France	58.8570	5	95.8570	5
6	Jennifer Lane	Great Britain	55.3500	6	94.8500	6
7	Beverley Balkind	Australia	56.9830	8	93.9830	7
8	Brigitte Serwonski	West Germany	55.5730	7	93.0730	8
9	Antonia Hauswirth	Switzerland	53.8800	9	Did not advance	
10	Eva Govezensky	Mexico	52.8300	10	Did not advance	
11	Barbro Ansehn	Sweden	52.4300	11	Did not advance	
12	María José Bilbao	Spain	52.3600	12	Did not advance	
13	Lillian Madsen	Denmark	48.5110	13	Did not advance	
14	A Norlund	Norway	43.8130	14	Did not advance	
15	Ida Weingartler	Austria	45.3630	15	Did not advance	
