= Austria at the 2017 World Aquatics Championships =

- Flag of Austria
- World Aquatics code: AUT
- National federation: Österreichischer Schwimmverband
- Website: www.osv.or.at

in Budapest, Hungary
- Competitors: 9 in 4 sports
- Medals: Gold 0 Silver 0 Bronze 0 Total 0

World Aquatics Championships appearances
- 1973; 1975; 1978; 1982; 1986; 1991; 1994; 1998; 2001; 2003; 2005; 2007; 2009; 2011; 2013; 2015; 2017; 2019; 2022; 2023; 2024; 2025

Austria is scheduled to compete at the 2017 World Aquatics Championships in Budapest, Hungary from 14 July to 30 July.

== Diving ==
Austria has entered 1 diver (one male).

| Athlete | Event | Preliminaries | | Semifinals | | Final | |
| Athlete | Event | Points | Rank | Points | Rank | Points | Rank |
|---|---|---|---|---|---|---|---|
| Constantin Blaha | Men's 1 m springboard | 348.20 | 17 | —N/a | | did not advance | |
| Constantin Blaha | Men's 3 m springboard | 398.05 | 19 q | 401.90 | 16 | did not advance | |

== Open water swimming ==
Austria has entered one open water swimmer

| Athlete | Event | Time | Rank |
|---|---|---|---|
| David Brandl | Men's 5 km | 55:40.1 | 36 |
| David Brandl | Men's 10 km | 1:54:24.3 | 32 |

== Swimming ==
Austrian swimmers have achieved qualifying standards in the following events (up to a maximum of 2 swimmers in each event at the A-standard entry time, and 1 at the B-standard):

| Athlete | Event | Heat | | Semifinal | | Final | |
| Athlete | Event | Time | Rank | Time | Rank | Time | Rank |
|---|---|---|---|---|---|---|---|
| Felix Auböck | Men's 200 m freestyle | 1:47.40 | 16** | did not advance | | | |
| Felix Auböck | Men's 400 m freestyle | 3:44.19 NR | 1 Q | —N/a | | 3:45.21 | 5 |
| Felix Auböck | Men's 800 m freestyle | 7:49.24 | 4 Q | —N/a | | 7:51.20 | 5 |
| Felix Auböck | Men's 1500 m freestyle | 15:02.78 | 12 | —N/a | | did not advance | |
| Christopher Rothbauer | Men's 100 m breaststroke | 1:02.22 | 41 | did not advance | | | |
| Christopher Rothbauer | Men's 200 m breaststroke | 2:13.61 | 25 | did not advance | | | |
| Patrick Staber | Men's 200 m butterfly | 1:59.10 | 25 | did not advance | | | |
| Patrick Staber | Men's 400 m individual medley | 4:19.15 | 16 | —N/a | | did not advance | |
| Caroline Pilhatsch | Women's 50 m backstroke | 28.45 | 22 | did not advance | | | |
| Caroline Pilhatsch | Women's 100 m backstroke | 1:02.10 | =29 | did not advance | | | |

** Auböck tied for sixteenth place, but elected not to partake in the swim-off.

== Synchronized swimming ==
Austria's synchronized swimming team consisted of 3 athletes (3 female).

Women

| Athlete | Event | Preliminaries | | Final | |
| Athlete | Event | Points | Rank | Points | Rank |
|---|---|---|---|---|---|
| Vasiliki Alexandri | Solo technical routine | 82.7804 | 8 Q | 83.9967 | 8 |
| Vasiliki Alexandri | Solo free routine | 85.3000 | 8 Q | 86.3333 | 8 |
| Anna-Maria Alexandri; Eirini Alexandri | Duet technical routine | 85.0805 | 9 Q | 85.7694 | 8 |
| Anna-Maria Alexandri; Eirini Alexandri | Duet free routine | 86.6333 | 9 Q | 86.7000 | 9 |

Legend: (R) = Reserve Athlete
