= Diving at the 1973 World Aquatics Championships – Men's 10 metre platform =

Men's 10 metre platform at the 1973 World Aquatics Championships
- Venue: Tašmajdan Sports and Recreation Center
- Location: Belgrade, Yugoslavia
- Dates: 8–9 September
- Competitors: 24 from 14 nations
- Winning points: 559.53

Medalists
gold medal	Klaus Dibiasi	Italy
silver medal	Keith Russell	United States
bronze medal	Falk Hoffman	East Germany

The Men's 10 metre platform competition at the 1973 World Aquatics Championships was held on 8 and 9 September 1973.

== Results ==
Green denotes finalists

Rank	Diver	Nationality	Preliminary		Final	
Rank	Diver	Nationality	Points	Rank	Points	Rank
1st place, gold medalist(s)	Klaus Dibiasi	Italy	526.77	1	559.53	1
2nd place, silver medalist(s)	Keith Russell	United States	519.99	2	523.74	2
3rd place, bronze medalist(s)	Falk Hoffman	East Germany	460.83	7	492.15	3
4	Giorgio Cagnotto	Italy	507.93	4	492.06	4
5	Nikolay Mikhailin	Soviet Union	515.05	3	484.05	5
6	Tim Moore	United States	491.88	5	484.02	6
7	David Ambartsumyan	Soviet Union	485.91	6	479.97	7
8	Scott Cranham	Canada	456.91	8	470.88	8
9	Carlos Girón	Mexico	454.47	9	did not advance	
10	Milton Machado	Brazil	448.32	10	did not advance	
11	José Robinson	Mexico	445.86	11	did not advance	
12	Jacques Deschouwer	France	442.08	12	did not advance	
13	Ken Grove	Australia	434.61	13	did not advance	
14	Paulo Costa	Brazil	418.32	14	did not advance	
15	Wagid Abu El-Soud	Egypt	413.70	15	did not advance	
16	Martyn Brown	Great Britain	413.28	16	did not advance	
17	José Viteri	Ecuador	412.11	17	did not advance	
18	Niki Stajkovic	Austria	406.14	18	did not advance	
19	Glenn Grout	Canada	405.75	19	did not advance	
20	Wolfram Ristam	East Germany	381.09	20	did not advance	
21	Frank Dufficy	Great Britain	326.88	21	did not advance	
22	Dragan Dumic	Yugoslavia	313.62	22	did not advance	
23	Nelson Suárez	Ecuador	302.43	23	did not advance	
24	Gaber Brane	Yugoslavia	302.10	24	did not advance	
