= List of Austrian records in swimming =

The Austrian records in swimming are the fastest ever performances of swimmers from Austria, which are recognised and ratified by Austria's national swimming federation: Österreichischer Schwimmverband (OSV).

All records were set in finals unless noted otherwise.

== Long Course (50 m) ==
=== Men ===
Event	Time		Name	Club	Date	Meet	Location	Ref
50 m freestyle	22.05	so	Heiko Gigler	Austria	22 May 2021	European Championships	Budapest, Hungary	
100 m freestyle	48.36	r	Heiko Gigler	Austria	18 April 2024	Graz Trophy	Graz, Austria	
200 m freestyle	1:44.96	h	Christian Giefing	Austria	13 August 2026	European Championships	Paris, France	
400 m freestyle	3:43.24		Felix Auböck	Austria	23 June 2024	European Championships	Belgrade, Serbia	
800 m freestyle	7:45.32		Felix Auböck	Loughborough University	12 April 2022	Swim Open Stockholm	Stockholm, Sweden	
1500 m freestyle	14:51.88	h	Felix Auböck	Austria	30 July 2021	Olympic Games	Tokyo, Japan	
50 m backstroke	25.00		Bernhard Reitshammer	ASV Linz	26 April 2019	Graz Trophy	Graz, Austria	
100 m backstroke	53.33	sf	Markus Rogan	Austria	5 July 2009	Universiade	Belgrade, Serbia	
200 m backstroke	1:55.49		Markus Rogan	Austria	15 August 2008	Olympic Games	Beijing, China	
50 m breaststroke	26.72		Luka Mladenovic	Austria	26 June 2025	European U23 Championships	Šamorín, Slovakia	
100 m breaststroke	59.54		Valentin Bayer	Austria	12 August 2022	European Championships	Rome, Italy	
200 m breaststroke	2:08.85	sf	Luka Mladenovic	Austria	12 August 2026	European Championships	Paris, France	
50m butterfly	22.95	sf	Simon Bucher	Austria	27 July 2025	World Championships	Singapore, Singapore	
100m butterfly	50.88	sf	Simon Bucher	Austria	1 August 2025	World Championships	Singapore, Singapore	
200m butterfly	1:54.17		Martin Espernberger	Austria	31 July 2024	Olympic Games	Paris, France	
200m individual medley	1:57.74	sf	Markus Rogan	Austria	27 July 2011	World Championships	Shanghai, China	
400m individual medley	4:15.23		Patrick Staber	SVS Schwimmen	14 April 2018	Swim Cup Eindhoven	Eindhoven, Netherlands	
4×100m freestyle relay	3:15.83	h	Lukas Edl (49.52); Viktor Kopf (49.40); Christian Giefing (48.29); Heiko Gigler (48.62)	Austria	13 August 2026	European Championships	Paris, France	
4×200m freestyle relay	7:11.45	h	Dominik Koll (1:47.72); David Brandl (1:46.45); Florian Janistyn (1:50.48); Markus Rogan (1:46.80)	Austria	12 August 2008	Olympic Games	Beijing, China	
4×100m medley relay	3:32.80		Bernhard Reitshammer (54.38); Valentin Bayer (59.73); Simon Bucher (51.04); Heiko Gigler (47.65)	Austria	25 June 2022	World Championships	Budapest, Hungary	

Legend: # – Record awaiting ratification by ÖSV; WR – World record; ER – European record; e – equalled existing record;
Records not set in finals: h – heat; sf – semifinal; r – relay 1st leg; rh – relay heat 1st leg; b – B final; † – en route to final mark; so – swim-off; tt – time trial

=== Women ===
Event	Time		Name	Club	Date	Meet	Location	Ref
50m freestyle	25.17		Birgit Koschischek	USC Graz	10 July 2015	Universiade	Gwangju, South Korea	
100m freestyle	54.41	r	Iris Julia Berger	Hovedstadens	11 July 2025	Danish Championships	Aarhus, Denmark	
200m freestyle	1:58.08		Iris Julia Berger	Hovedstadens	11 July 2025	Danish Championships	Aarhus, Denmark	
400m freestyle	4:08.37	h	Marlene Kahler	Austria	25 July 2021	Olympic Games	Tokyo, Japan	
800m freestyle	8:32.51		Marlene Kahler	Austria	29 February 2020	Berlin Open	Berlin, Germany	
1500m freestyle	16:20.05	h	Marlene Kahler	Austria	26 July 2021	Olympic Games	Tokyo, Japan	
50m backstroke	27.77	sf	Caroline Pilhatsch	Austria	24 July 2019	World Championships	Gwangju, South Korea	
100m backstroke	1:01.07	h	Caroline Pilhatsch	Austria	22 July 2019	World Championships	Gwangju, South Korea	
200m backstroke	2:08.19		Lena Grabowski	Austria	23 May 2021	European Championships	Budapest, Hungary	
50m breaststroke	31.32	h	Mirna Jukić	Austria	1 August 2009	World Championships	Rome, Italy	
100m breaststroke	1:06.58	h	Mirna Jukić	Austria	27 July 2009	World Championships	Rome, Italy	
200m breaststroke	2:21.97		Mirna Jukić	Austria	31 July 2009	World Championships	Rome, Italy	
50m butterfly	26.31		Fabienne Nadarajah	SVS-Schwimmen	25 April 2009	International Austria-Meet	Vienna, Austria	
100m butterfly	58.52		Iris Julia Berger	Hovedstadens	8 April 2025	Danish Open	Copenhagen, Denmark	
200m butterfly	2:09.76		Claudia Hufnagl	USC Graz	21 December 2019	Győr Open	Győr, Hungary	
200m individual medley	2:12.09		Lisa Zaiser	Austria	6 April 2014	Graz Trophy	Graz, Austria	
400m individual medley	4:41.33	h	Jördis Steinegger	Austria	31 July 2011	World Championships	Shanghai, China	
4×100m freestyle relay	3:41.99		Iris Julia Berger (55.53); Cornelia Pammer (56.33); Marijana Jelic (55.66); Lena Kreundl (54.47)	Austria	19 June 2024	European Championships	Belgrade, Serbia	
4×200m freestyle relay	8:04.27	h	Iris Julia Berger (1:59.07); Aviva Hollinsky (2:02.30); Marlene Kahler (2:00.69); Nida Omid (2:02.21)	Austria	10 August 2026	European Championships	Paris, France	
4×100m medley relay	4:09.42	h	Uschi Halbreiner (1:02.25); Lena Kreundl (1:11.57); Birgit Koschischek (59.45); Lisa Zaiser (56.15)	Austria	22 May 2016	European Championships	London, Great Britain	

Legend: # – Record awaiting ratification by ÖSV; WR – World record; ER – European record; e – equalled existing record;
Records not set in finals: h – heat; sf – semifinal; r – relay 1st leg; rh – relay heat 1st leg; b – B final; † – en route to final mark; so – swim-off; tt – time trial

=== Mixed relay ===
Event	Time		Name	Club	Date	Meet	Location	Ref
4×100m freestyle relay	3:31.93	h	Alexander Trampitsch (49.73); Bernhard Reitshammer (49.19); Lena Kreundl (56.02); Cornelia Pammer (56.99)	Austria	8 August 2018	European Championships	Glasgow, Great Britain	
4×100m medley relay	3:52.77	h	Bernhard Reitshammer (55.10); Christopher Rothbauer (1:01.08); Lena Kreundl (1:00.71); Cornelia Pammer (55.88)	Austria	20 May 2021	European Championships	Budapest, Hungary	

Legend: # – Record awaiting ratification by ÖSV; WR – World record; ER – European record; e – equalled existing record;
Records not set in finals: h – heat; so – swim-off

== Short Course (25 m) ==
=== Men ===
Event	Time		Name	Club	Date	Meet	Location	Ref
50m freestyle	21.00	h, =	Heiko Gigler	Austria	6 December 2025	European Championships	Lublin, Poland	
50m freestyle	21.00	sf, =	Heiko Gigler	Austria	6 December 2025	European Championships	Lublin, Poland	
100m freestyle	46.30	sf	Heiko Gigler	Austria	5 December 2025	European Championships	Lublin, Poland	
200m freestyle	1:43.35		Felix Auböck	New York Breakers	2 November 2020	International Swimming League	Budapest, Hungary	
400m freestyle	3:35.90		Felix Auböck	Austria	16 December 2021	World Championships	Abu Dhabi, United Arab Emirates	
800m freestyle	7:31.89		Felix Auböck	Austria	21 November 2020	ISL Test Event	Budapest, Hungary	
1500m freestyle	14:52.90	h	Felix Auböck	Austria	10 December 2016	World Championships	Windsor, Canada	
50m backstroke	23.25		Lukas Edl	Welser TV 1862	18 October 2026	-	Plzen, Czech Republic	
50m backstroke	23.18	h, #	Lukas Edl	Welser TV 1862	23 October 2026	Slovak Championships	Šamorín, Slovakia	
100m backstroke	50.20		Markus Rogan	Austria	21 November 2009	World Cup	Singapore, Singapore	
200m backstroke	1:47.64		Markus Rogan	Austria	11 November 2009	World Cup	Stockholm, Sweden	
50m breaststroke	26.10		Bernhard Reitshammer	Iron	20 November 2021	International Swimming League	Eindhoven, Netherlands	
100m breaststroke	56.27		Luka Mladenovic	Austria	3 December 2025	European Championships	Lublin, Poland	
200m breaststroke	2:02.48		Luka Mladenovic	Austria	5 December 2025	European Championships	Lublin, Poland	
50m butterfly	22.35	sf	Simon Bucher	Austria	13 December 2022	World Championships	Melbourne, Australia	
100m butterfly	49.02		Simon Bucher	Tiroler Wassersportverein	29 November 2024	Austrian Championships	Graz, Austria	
200m butterfly	1:50.32		Dinko Jukić	Austria	12 December 2009	European Championships	Istanbul, Turkey	
100m individual medley	51.11		Bernhard Reitshammer	Austria	13 December 2024	World Championships	Budapest, Hungary	
200m individual medley	1:51.72		Markus Rogan	Austria	10 December 2009	European Championships	Istanbul, Turkey	
400m individual medley	4:03.01		Dinko Jukić	Austria	12 December 2008	European Championships	Rijeka, Croatia	
4×50m freestyle relay	1:25.30	h	Heiko Gigler (21.05); Leon Opatril (21.72); Lukas Edl (21.07); Alexander Trampitsch (21.46)	Austria	2 December 2025	European Championships	Lublin, Poland	
4×100m freestyle relay	3:15.31		Alexander Trampitsch (48.71); Simon Bucher (48.75); Moritz Dittrich (49.70); Bernhard Reitshammer (48.15)	ASV Linz	10 June 2023	Austrian Team Championships	Graz, Austria	
4×200m freestyle relay	7:02.70	h	David Brandl (1:45.42); Felix Auböck (1:43.90); Sebastian Steffan (1:46.03); Jakub Maly (1:47.35)	Austria	4 December 2014	World Championships	Doha, Qatar	
4×50m medley relay	1:31.85		Lukas Edl (23.70); Valentin Bayer (25.79); Simon Bucher (22.01); Heiko Gigler (20.35)	Austria	7 December 2025	European Championships	Lublin, Poland	
4×100m medley relay	3:27.99	h	Lukas Edl (51.92); Bernhard Reitshammer (57.56); Andreas Rizek (52.24); Heiko Gigler (46.27)	Austria	15 December 2024	World Championships	Budapest, Hungary	

Legend: # – Record awaiting ratification by ÖSV; WR – World record; ER – European record; e – equalled existing record;
Records not set in finals: h – heat; sf – semifinal; r – relay 1st leg; rh – relay heat 1st leg; b – B final; † – en route to final mark; so – swim-off; tt – time trial

=== Women ===
Event	Time		Name	Club	Date	Meet	Location	Ref
50m freestyle	24.43	rh	Birgit Koschischek	Austria	4 December 2015	European Championships	Netanya, Israel	
100m freestyle	53.35	h	Iris Julia Berger	Austria	11 December 2024	World Championships	Budapest, Hungary	
200m freestyle	1:54.44		Lisa Zaiser	Austria	31 August 2014	World Cup	Dubai, United Arab Emirates	
400m freestyle	4:02.85	h	Jördis Steinegger	Austria	13 December 2008	European Championships	Rijeka, Croatia	
800m freestyle	8:20.03		Jördis Steinegger	Austria	12 December 2008	European Championships	Rijeka, Croatia	
1500m freestyle	16:03.68		Marlene Kahler	Austria	19 October 2019	Plzeňské sprinty	Plzeň, Czech Republic	
50m backstroke	25.99		Caroline Pilhatsch	Austria	15 December 2018	World Championships	Hangzhou, China	
100m backstroke	58.26		Iris Julia Berger	USC Graz	30 November 2024	Austrian Championships	Graz, Austria	
200m backstroke	2:04.74		Lena Grabowski	Austria	4 November 2021	European Championships	Kazan, Russia	
50m breaststroke	30.30	so	Cornelia Pammer	Austria	4 December 2019	European Championships	Glasgow, Great Britain	
100m breaststroke	1:05.24		Mirna Jukić	SC Austria Wien	21 December 2008	Austrian Championships	Vienna, Austria	
200m breaststroke	2:19.23		Mirna Jukić	SC Austria Wien	20 December 2008	Austrian Championships	Vienna, Austria	
50m butterfly	25.64		Fabienne Nadarajah	Austria	11 December 2009	European Championships	Istanbul, Turkey	
100m butterfly	56.38	sf	Iris Julia Berger	Austria	13 December 2024	World Championships	Budapest, Hungary	
200m butterfly	2:06.76	so	Claudia Hufnagl	Austria	6 December 2019	European Championships	Glasgow, Great Britain	
100m individual medley	58.65		Lena Kreundl	Austria	7 December 2023	European Championships	Otopeni, Romania	
200m individual medley	2:06.89		Lena Kreundl	Austria	9 December 2023	European Championships	Otopeni, Romania	
400m individual medley	4:33.91	h	Jördis Steinegger	Austria	11 December 2011	European Championships	Szczecin, Poland	
4×50m freestyle relay	1:39.30		Nina Gangl (24.82); Cornelia Pammer (24.95); Lena Kreundl (24.81); Caroline Pilhatsch (24.72)	Austria	2 November 2021	European Championships	Kazan, Russia	
4×100m freestyle relay	3:36.86	h	Lena Kreundl (54.34); Birgit Koschischek (53.75); Lisa Zaiser (54.18); Jördis Steinegger (54.59)	Austria	5 December 2014	World Championships	Doha, Qatar	
4×200m freestyle relay	7:54.70	h	Lisa Zaiser (1:56.54); Jördis Steinegger (1:57.86); Lena Kreundl (2:00.64); Claudia Hufnagl (1:59.66)	Austria	3 December 2014	World Championships	Doha, Qatar	
4×50m medley relay	1:48.05		Caroline Pilhatsch (26.54); Cornelia Pammer (30.53); Lenda Kreundl (26.44); Nina Gangl (24.54)	Austria	4 November 2021	European Championships	Kazan, Russia	
4×100m medley relay	4:02.83	h	Caroline Pilhatsch (59.49); Cornelia Pammer (1:07.84); Lena Kreundl (1:00.21); Marlene Kahler (55.29)	Austria	16 December 2018	World Championships	Hangzhou, China	

Legend: # – Record awaiting ratification by ÖSV; WR – World record; ER – European record; e – equalled existing record;
Records not set in finals: h – heat; sf – semifinal; r – relay 1st leg; rh – relay heat 1st leg; b – B final; † – en route to final mark; so – swim-off; tt – time trial

=== Mixed relay ===
Event	Time		Name	Club	Date	Meet	Location	Ref
4×50 m freestyle relay	1:32.28		Heiko Gigler (21.51); Simon Bucher (21.51); Nina Gangl (24.48); Cornelia Pammer (24.78)	Austria	6 November 2021	European Championships	Glasgow, Great Britain	
4×50 m medley relay	1:39.71	h	Caroline Pilhatsch (27.06); Bernhard Reitshammer (25.79); Simon Bucher (22.34); Lena Kreundl (24.52)	Austria	14 December 2022	World Championships	Melbourne, Australia	

Legend: # – Record awaiting ratification by ÖSV; WR – World record; ER – European record; e – equalled existing record;
Records not set in finals: h – heat; so – swim-off
