= Austria at the 2019 World Aquatics Championships =

- Flag of Austria
- FINA code: AUT
- National federation: Austrian Swimming Federation
- Website: osv.or.at (in German)

World Aquatics Championships appearances
- 1973; 1975; 1978; 1982; 1986; 1991; 1994; 1998; 2001; 2003; 2005; 2007; 2009; 2011; 2013; 2015; 2017; 2019; 2022; 2023; 2024

Austria competed at the 2019 World Aquatics Championships in Gwangju, South Korea from 12 to 28 July.

== Artistic swimming ==
Austria's artistic swimming team consisted of 3 athletes (3 female).

Women

| Athlete | Event | Preliminaries | | Final | |
| Athlete | Event | Points | Rank | Points | Rank |
|---|---|---|---|---|---|
| Vasiliki Alexandri | Solo technical routine | 85.3434 | 8 Q | 85.6098 | 8 |
| Vasiliki Alexandri | Solo free routine | 86.7333 | 8 Q | 87.1667 | 8 |
| Anna-Maria Alexandri; Eirini Alexandri; Vasiliki Alexandri (R) | Duet technical routine | 86.1410 | 8 Q | 87.0378 | 8 |
| Anna-Maria Alexandri; Eirini Alexandri; Vasiliki Alexandri (R) | Duet free routine | 86.7667 | 9 Q | 87.1000 | 10 |

Legend: (R) = Reserve Athlete

== Open water swimming ==
Austria qualified one male open water swimmer.

| Athlete | Event | Time | Rank |
|---|---|---|---|
| David Brandl | Men's 5 km | 53:50.1 | 32 |
| David Brandl | Men's 10 km | 1:51:26.3 | 44 |

== Swimming ==
Austria has entered seven swimmers.

Men

| Athlete | Event | Heat | | Semifinal | | Final | |
| Athlete | Event | Time | Rank | Time | Rank | Time | Rank |
|---|---|---|---|---|---|---|---|
| Felix Auböck | 200 m freestyle | DNS | | Did not advance | | | |
| Felix Auböck | 400 m freestyle | 3:48.78 | 13 | — | | Did not advance | |
| Felix Auböck | 800 m freestyle | 8:02.26 | 24 | — | | Did not advance | |
| Valentin Bayer | 100 m breaststroke | 1:01.68 | 36 | Did not advance | | | |
| Valentin Bayer | 200 m breaststroke | 2:12.27 | 28 | Did not advance | | | |
| Bernhard Reitshammer | 50 m freestyle | 22.91 | 49 | Did not advance | | | |
| Bernhard Reitshammer | 50 m backstroke | 25.50 | =24 | Did not advance | | | |
| Bernhard Reitshammer | 100 m backstroke | 54.94 | 29 | Did not advance | | | |
| Bernhard Reitshammer | 50 m breaststroke | 27.49 | 21 | Did not advance | | | |
| Bernhard Reitshammer | 200 m individual medley | DNS | | Did not advance | | | |
| Patrick Stäber | 400 m individual medley | DSQ | | — | | Did not advance | |

Women

| Athlete | Event | Heat | | Semifinal | | Final | |
| Athlete | Event | Time | Rank | Time | Rank | Time | Rank |
|---|---|---|---|---|---|---|---|
| Lena Grabowski | 200 m backstroke | 2:11.16 | =17 | Did not advance | | | |
| Marlene Kahler | 200 m freestyle | 2:00.56 | 24 | Did not advance | | | |
| Marlene Kahler | 400 m freestyle | 4:10.49 | 14 | — | | Did not advance | |
| Marlene Kahler | 800 m freestyle | 8:45.13 | 22 | — | | Did not advance | |
| Marlene Kahler | 1500 m freestyle | 16:32.00 | 19 | — | | Did not advance | |
| Caroline Pilhatsch | 50 m backstroke | 28.28 | 15 Q | 27.77 | 6 Q | 27.78 | 7 |
| Caroline Pilhatsch | 100 m backstroke | 1:01.07 | 20 | Did not advance | | | |
