= Synchronised swimming at the 1973 World Aquatics Championships – Duet routine =

Synchronised swimming – Duet routine at the 1973 World Aquatics Championships
- Venue: Tašmajdan Sports and Recreation Center
- Location: Belgrade, Yugoslavia
- Dates: 3 September
- Competitors: 18 from 9 nations
- Winning points: 118.3910

Medalists
gold medal	Teresa Andersen; Gail Johnson	United States
silver medal	Jojo Carrier; Madeleine Ramsay	Canada
bronze medal	Masako Fujiwara; Yasuko Fujiwara	Japan

The duet routine competition at the 1973 World Aquatics Championships was held on 3 September 1973.

== Results ==
Rank	Nation	Divers	Points
1st place, gold medalist(s)	United States	Teresa Andersen; Gail Johnson	118.3910
2nd place, silver medalist(s)	Canada	Jojo Carrier; Madeleine Ramsay	112.9170
3rd place, bronze medalist(s)	Japan	Masako Fujiwara; Yasuko Fujiwara	109.7020
4	Netherlands	Monique Gerritsen; Liesbeth Wouda	96.9800
5	Mexico	Pepita Sánchez; Eva Govezensky	93.5200
6	Great Britain	Jennifer Lane; Doris Davis	94.1420
7	France	Françoise Schuler; Elysabeth Gazelles	91.1420
8	Sweden	Barbro Ansehn; Marie Cervin	88.7500
9	Switzerland	Susi Morger; Antonia Hauswirth	86.7730
