= Swimming at the 2023 World Aquatics Championships – Men's 50 metre breaststroke =

Men's 50 metre breaststroke at the 2023 World Aquatics Championships
- Venue: Marine Messe Fukuoka
- Location: Fukuoka, Japan
- Dates: 25 July (heats and semifinals); 26 July (final)
- Competitors: 61 from 58 nations
- Winning time: 26.29

Medalists
gold medal	Qin Haiyang	China
silver medal	Nic Fink	United States
bronze medal	Sun Jiajun	China

The men's 50 metre breaststroke competition at the 2023 World Aquatics Championships was held on 25 and 26 July 2023.

== Records ==
Prior to the competition, the existing world and championship records were as follows.

World record	Adam Peaty (GBR)	25.95	Budapest, Hungary	25 July 2017
Competition record	Adam Peaty (GBR)	25.95	Budapest, Hungary	25 July 2017

== Results ==
=== Heats ===
The heats were started on 25 July at 10:32.

Rank	Heat	Lane	Name	Nationality	Time	Notes
1	6	5	Qin Haiyang	China	26.34	Q, AS
2	7	4	Nicolò Martinenghi	Italy	26.64	Q
3	5	4	Sun Jiajun	China	26.76	Q
3	6	3	Samuel Williamson	Australia	26.76	Q
5	7	5	João Gomes Júnior	Brazil	26.81	Q
6	6	4	Nic Fink	United States	26.91	Q
7	5	3	Lucas Matzerath	Germany	26.94	Q
8	5	5	Simone Cerasuolo	Italy	27.06	Q
9	7	3	Bernhard Reitshammer	Austria	27.11	Q
10	5	2	Caspar Corbeau	Netherlands	27.15	Q
11	7	7	Peter John Stevens	Slovenia	27.20	Q
12	7	1	Arkadios Aspougalis	Greece	27.23	Q
13	7	2	Emre Sakçı	Turkey	27.28	Q
14	7	6	Michael Houlie	South Africa	27.31	Q
15	6	6	Yuya Hinomoto	Japan	27.35	Q
16	5	6	Valentin Bayer	Austria	27.36	Q
17	6	1	Miguel de Lara	Mexico	27.38	NR
18	6	8	Mikel Schreuders	Aruba	27.47	
19	6	7	Choi Dong-yeol	South Korea	27.48	
19	7	0	Denis Petrashov	Kyrgyzstan	27.48	
21	5	1	James Dergousoff	Canada	27.53	
22	4	5	Darragh Greene	Ireland	27.54	
23	6	0	Joshua Gilbert	New Zealand	27.59	
24	7	8	Jorge Murillo	Colombia	27.71	
25	7	9	Maksym Ovchinnikov	Ukraine	27.78	
26	5	0	Youssef El-Kamash	Egypt	27.80	
27	4	1	Chao Man Hou	Macau	27.84	
28	5	7	Andrius Šidlauskas	Lithuania	27.98	
29	6	2	Olli Kokko	Finland	27.99	
30	4	2	Nicholas Lia	Norway	28.09	
30	4	3	Jadon Wuilliez	Antigua and Barbuda	28.09	NR
32	5	8	Ronan Wantenaar	Namibia	28.24	
33	3	4	Mariano Lazzerini	Chile	28.44	
34	4	6	Maximillian Wei Ang	Singapore	28.51	
35	4	4	Panayiotis Panaretos	Cyprus	28.55	
36	4	8	Adrian Robinson	Botswana	28.67	
37	5	9	Andrew Goh	Malaysia	28.75	
38	4	0	Andres Martijena	Dominican Republic	28.86	
39	6	9	Muhammad Dwiky Raharjo	Indonesia	28.89	
40	3	3	Tasi Limtiaco	Micronesia	28.95	
41	3	9	Julio Calero Suarez	Cuba	28.97	
42	4	9	Matthew Lawrence	Mozambique	29.02	
43	3	5	Luka Eradze	Georgia	29.06	
44	2	8	Alexandre Grand'Pierre	Haiti	29.10	
45	4	7	Phạm Thanh Bảo	Vietnam	29.17	
46	3	8	Ashot Chakhoyan	Armenia	29.46	
47	3	6	Giacomo Casadei	San Marino	29.84	
48	3	0	Zach Moyo	Zambia	30.05	
49	3	2	Shane Cadogan	Saint Vincent and the Grenadines	30.23	
50	3	1	Jayden Loran	Curaçao	30.32	
51	2	1	Hendrik Powdar	Suriname	30.75	
52	3	7	Sebastien Kouma	Mali	31.03	
53	2	2	Chadd Ng Chiu Hing Ning	Eswatini	32.37	
54	2	4	Slava Sihanouvong	Laos	32.93	
55	1	5	Anthony Deleon	Northern Mariana Islands	33.05	
56	2	5	Fodé Amara Camara	Guinea	33.42	NR
57	2	3	Jion Hosei	Palau	35.01	
58	2	7	Hamzah Mayas	Yemen	40.35	
59	2	6	Ousman Jobe	Gambia	41.77	
	1	4	Hilal Hemed Hilal	Tanzania	DSQ	
	2	0	Abdulla Khalid Jamal	Bahrain	DSQ	
	1	3	Ibrahim Kamara	Sierra Leone	DNS	

=== Semifinals ===
The semifinals were held on 25 July at 20:34.

Rank	Heat	Lane	Name	Nationality	Time	Notes
1	2	4	Qin Haiyang	China	26.20	Q, AS
2	1	4	Nicolò Martinenghi	Italy	26.74	Q
3	2	5	Sun Jiajun	China	26.78	Q
4	2	6	Lucas Matzerath	Germany	26.89	Q
5	2	3	João Gomes Júnior	Brazil	26.90	Q
6	1	3	Nic Fink	United States	26.95	Q
7	2	7	Peter John Stevens	Slovenia	27.04	Q
8	1	5	Samuel Williamson	Australia	27.06	Q
9	1	6	Simone Cerasuolo	Italy	27.07	
10	1	2	Caspar Corbeau	Netherlands	27.21	
11	2	2	Bernhard Reitshammer	Austria	27.25	
11	2	8	Yuya Hinomoto	Japan	27.25	
13	2	1	Emre Sakçı	Turkey	27.32	
14	1	8	Valentin Bayer	Austria	27.45	
15	1	7	Arkadios Aspougalis	Greece	27.50	
16	1	1	Michael Houlie	South Africa	27.57	

=== Final ===
The final was held on 26 July at 21:01.

Rank	Lane	Name	Nationality	Time	Notes
1st place, gold medalist(s)	4	Qin Haiyang	China	26.29	
2nd place, silver medalist(s)	7	Nic Fink	United States	26.59	
3rd place, bronze medalist(s)	3	Sun Jiajun	China	26.79	
4	8	Samuel Williamson	Australia	26.82	
5	5	Nicolò Martinenghi	Italy	26.84	
6	6	Lucas Matzerath	Germany	26.94	
7	2	João Gomes Júnior	Brazil	26.97	
8	1	Peter John Stevens	Slovenia	27.08	
