= 2024 World Aquatics Swimming Championships (25 m) – Men's 100 metre individual medley =

Swimming competition

Men's 100 metre individual medley at the 2024 World Aquatics Swimming Championships (25 m)
- Venue: Duna Arena
- Location: Budapest, Hungary
- Dates: 12 December (heats and semifinals); 13 December (final)
- Competitors: 51

Medalists
gold medal	Noè Ponti	Switzerland
silver medal	Bernhard Reitshammer	Austria
bronze medal	Caio Pumputis	Brazil

The men's 100 metre individual medley event at the 2024 World Aquatics Swimming Championships (25 m) was held from 12 to 13 December 2024 at the Duna Arena in Budapest, Hungary.

== Records ==
Prior to the competition, the existing world and championship records were as follows:

World record	Caeleb Dressel (USA)	49.28	Budapest	22 November 2020
Competition record	Kliment Kolesnikov (RUS)	50.63	Hangzhou	14 December 2018

== Background ==
None of the 2022 podium returned for the event in Budapest, but Switzerland’s Noè Ponti emerged as the clear favourite. Ponti set a lifetime best of 50.39 at the 2024 Singapore World Cup stop, becoming the third-fastest performer in history and the only entrant under 51 seconds. Austria’s Bernhard Reitshammer, the 2023 European champion, held a season best of 52.79 and aimed to improve on his seventh-place finish from the previous short course world championships. Spain’s Carles Coll entered with a national record of 51.73, while the USA’s Michael Andrew, the 2016 world champion, held a personal best of 51.22 and had swum 52.54 earlier in the season. Turkey’s Emre Sakçı (51.14) and Berke Saka (51.99) also entered with sub-52 times. South Korea’s Kim Ji-hun (52.00) and Brazil’s Caio Pumputis (52.06) were final contenders. Italy’s Alberto Razzetti and the Netherlands’ Caspar Corbeau, though not IM specialists, were also in the mix for medals.

SwimSwam predicted Ponti would win, Reitshammer would come second, and Coll Marti would come third.

== Results ==
=== Heats ===
The heats were started on 12 December at 10:18.

Rank	Heat	Lane	Name	Nationality	Time	Notes
1	2	3	Nikola Miljenić	Croatia	51.32	Q
2	4	4	Noè Ponti	Switzerland	51.67	Q
3	4	5	Carles Coll	Spain	51.70	Q, NR
4	2	4	Bernhard Reitshammer	Austria	51.78	Q
5	4	3	Caio Pumputis	Brazil	51.81	Q, SA
6	3	4	Emre Sakçı	Turkey	52.10	Q
7	3	5	Berke Saka	Turkey	52.23	Q
8	2	5	Kim Ji-hun	South Korea	52.24	Q
9	3	3	Heiko Gigler	Austria	52.26	Q
10	3	6	Michael Andrew	United States	52.33	Q
11	2	6	Leonardo Coelho Santos	Brazil	52.43	Q
12	4	6	Miroslav Knedla	Czech Republic	52.56	Q
13	4	2	Ronny Brannkarr	Finland	52.91	Q
=14	3	2	Dmitrii Savenko	Neutral Athletes B	53.07	Q
=14	4	7	Vadym Naumenko	Ukraine	53.07	Q, NR
16	3	7	Benedek Andor	Hungary	53.67	Q
17	2	7	Alex Ahtiainen	Estonia	53.79	R
18	2	1	Jaouad Syoud	Algeria	53.96	R, NR
19	1	6	Munzer Kabbara	Lebanon	54.03	NR
=20	4	1	Yat Ho Koo	Hong Kong	54.36	
=20	4	8	Einar Margeir Ágústsson	Iceland	54.36	
22	3	1	Samuel Lewis Brown	New Zealand	54.50	
23	3	8	Wang Ziming	China	54.60	
24	4	9	Daniil Giourtzidis	Greece	54.87	
25	2	8	Ádám Halás	Slovakia	54.91	
26	4	0	Mohamed Mahmoud	Qatar	55.61	
27	1	1	Gleb Kovalenya	Kazakhstan	55.85	
28	1	5	Terence Ng	Malaysia	55.91	
29	2	9	Nguyễn Quang Thuấn	Vietnam	56.67	
30	1	7	Hansel McCaig	Fiji	57.31	NR
31	3	0	Lam Chi Chong	Macau	57.99	
32	1	2	Alexandros Grigoriou	Cyprus	58.45	
33	1	3	Joel Ling	Brunei	58.47	NR
34	3	9	Kazuumi Nestor	Palau	59.75	
35	2	0	Taiyo Akimaru	Northern Mariana Islands	1:03.14	
	2	2	Caspar Corbeau	Netherlands	Did not start	
	1	4	Matthew Abeysinghe	Sri Lanka	Disqualified	

=== Semifinals ===
The semifinals were started on 12 December at 19:02.

Rank	Heat	Lane	Name	Nationality	Time	Notes
1	1	4	Noe Ponti	Switzerland	50.43	Q
2	2	2	Heiko Gigler	Austria	51.30	Q
3	1	5	Bernhard Reitshammer	Austria	51.33	Q
4	2	5	Carles Coll	Spain	51.50	Q
5	2	3	Caio Pumputis	Brazil	51.76	Q
6	2	6	Berke Saka	Turkey	51.89	Q
7	1	2	Michael Andrew	United States	51.91	Q
8	1	7	Miroslav Knedla	Czech Republic	52.20	Q
9	1	3	Emre Sakci	Turkey	52.24	
10	1	6	Kim Ji-hun	South Korea	52.39	
11	2	4	Nikola Miljenic	Croatia	52.56	
12	2	7	Leonardo Coelho Santos	Brazil	52.66	
13	1	1	Dmitrii Savenko	Neutral Athletes B	52.69	
14	2	1	Ronny Brannkarr	Finland	52.87	
15	2	8	Vadym Naumenko	Ukraine	52.91	
16	1	8	Benedek Andor	Hungary	53.73	

=== Final ===
The final was held on 13 December at 18:59.

Rank	Lane	Name	Nationality	Time	Notes
1st place, gold medalist(s)	4	Noè Ponti	Switzerland	50.33	CR, NR
2nd place, silver medalist(s)	3	Bernhard Reitshammer	Austria	51.11	NR
3rd place, bronze medalist(s)	2	Caio Pumputis	Brazil	51.35	SA
4	1	Michael Andrew	United States	51.37	
5	6	Carles Coll	Spain	51.52	
6	5	Heiko Gigler	Austria	51.67	
7	7	Berke Saka	Turkey	51.82	
8	8	Miroslav Knedla	Czech Republic	51.90	NR
