= Austria at the 2013 World Aquatics Championships =

- Flag of Austria
- FINA code: AUT
- National federation: Österreichischer Schwimmverband
- Website: www.osv.or.at

in Barcelona, Spain
- Competitors: 7 in 3 sports
- Medals: Gold 0 Silver 0 Bronze 0 Total 0

World Aquatics Championships appearances
- 1973; 1975; 1978; 1982; 1986; 1991; 1994; 1998; 2001; 2003; 2005; 2007; 2009; 2011; 2013; 2015; 2017; 2019; 2022; 2023; 2024

Austria competed at the 2013 World Aquatics Championships in Barcelona, Spain between 19 July and 4 August 2013.

== Diving ==
Austria qualified two quota places for the following diving events.

Men

Athlete	Event	Preliminaries		Semifinals		Final	
Athlete	Event	Points	Rank	Points	Rank	Points	Rank
Constantin Blaha	1 m springboard	358.60	10 Q	—		411.75	5
Constantin Blaha	3 m springboard	385.00	18 Q	438.50	7 Q	429.45	9

Women

Athlete	Event	Preliminaries		Semifinals		Final	
Athlete	Event	Points	Rank	Points	Rank	Points	Rank
Sophia Somloi	1 m springboard	221.70	22	—		did not advance	
Sophia Somloi	3 m springboard	200.30	36	did not advance			

== Swimming ==
Austrian swimmers achieved qualifying standards in the following events (up to a maximum of 2 swimmers in each event at the A-standard entry time, and 1 at the B-standard):

Men

Athlete	Event	Heat		Semifinal		Final	
Athlete	Event	Time	Rank	Time	Rank	Time	Rank
David Brandl	200 m freestyle	1:49.61	32	did not advance			
David Brandl	400 m freestyle	3:51.98	19	—		did not advance	
David Brandl	800 m freestyle	8:05.45	23	—		did not advance	
Jakub Maly	200 m breaststroke	2:16.12	33	did not advance			
Jakub Maly	200 m individual medley	2:01.92	25	did not advance			
Jakub Maly	400 m individual medley	4:19.21	16	—		did not advance	

Women

Athlete	Event	Heat		Semifinal		Final	
Athlete	Event	Time	Rank	Time	Rank	Time	Rank
Caroline Reitshammer	50 m breaststroke	32.72	38	did not advance			
Caroline Reitshammer	100 m breaststroke	1:11.43	39	did not advance			
Lisa Zaiser	200 m breaststroke	DSQ		did not advance			
Lisa Zaiser	50 m butterfly	27.41	33	did not advance			
Lisa Zaiser	200 m individual medley	2:14.85	20	did not advance			

== Synchronized swimming ==
Austria has qualified a single synchronized swimmer.

Athlete	Event	Preliminaries		Final	
Athlete	Event	Points	Rank	Points	Rank
Nadine Brandl	Solo free routine	82.040	17	did not advance	
Nadine Brandl	Solo technical routine	82.100	15 Q	81.900	15
