= Diving at the 1973 World Aquatics Championships – Men's 3 metre springboard =

Men's 3 metre springboard at the 1973 World Aquatics Championships
- Venue: Tašmajdan Sports and Recreation Center
- Location: Belgrade, Yugoslavia
- Dates: 5–6 September
- Competitors: 24 from 16 nations
- Winning points: 618.57

Medalists
| gold medal | Phil Boggs | United States |
| silver medal | Klaus Dibiasi | Italy |
| bronze medal | Keith Russell | United States |

The Men's 3 metre springboard competition at the 1973 World Aquatics Championships was held on 5 and 6 September 1973.

== Results ==
Green denotes finalists

| Rank | Diver | Nationality | Preliminary | | Final | |
| Rank | Diver | Nationality | Points | Rank | Points | Rank |
|---|---|---|---|---|---|---|
| 1st place, gold medalist(s) | Phil Boggs | United States | 602.25 | 2 | 618.57 | 1 |
| 2nd place, silver medalist(s) | Klaus Dibiasi | Italy | 605.40 | 1 | 617.73 | 2 |
| 3rd place, bronze medalist(s) | Keith Russell | United States | 576.75 | 4 | 579.48 | 3 |
| 4 | Giorgio Cagnotto | Italy | 563.22 | 5 | 574.05 | 4 |
| 5 | Vyacheslav Strakhov | Soviet Union | 590.82 | 3 | 553.01 | 5 |
| 6 | Vladimir Vasin | Soviet Union | 554.97 | 6 | 551.91 | 6 |
| 7 | Falk Hoffman | East Germany | 546.69 | 7 | 549.90 | 7 |
| 8 | Scott Cranham | Canada | 503.49 | 8 | 485.76 | 8 |
| 9 | Norbert Huda | West Germany | 499.41 | 9 | did not advance | |
| 10 | Carlos Girón | Mexico | 496.89 | 10 | did not advance | |
| 11 | Wolfram Ristam | East Germany | 487.68 | 11 | did not advance | |
| 12 | Trevor Simpson | Great Britain | 470.04 | 12 | did not advance | |
| 13 | Ken Armstrong | Canada | 466.08 | 13 | did not advance | |
| 14 | Roar Loken | Norway | 456.87 | 14 | did not advance | |
| 15 | Ken Grove | Australia | 449.01 | 15 | did not advance | |
| 16 | Chris Valls | Great Britain | 437.40 | 16 | did not advance | |
| 17 | Josef Klein | Austria | 409.35 | 17 | did not advance | |
| 18 | Porfirio Becerril | Mexico | 399. 78 | 18 | did not advance | |
| 19 | Alain Goosen | France | 395.14 | 19 | did not advance | |
| 20 | Júlio César Veloso | Brazil | 393.99 | 20 | did not advance | |
| 21 | Jorge Head | Spain | 391.77 | 21 | did not advance | |
| 22 | Marcel Georgen | Luxembourg | 371.70 | 22 | did not advance | |
| 23 | Nelson Suárez | Ecuador | 334.80 | 23 | did not advance | |
| 24 | José Vitari | Ecuador | 299.70 | 24 | did not advance | |
| — | Attila Haimal | Hungary | did not start | | | |
| — | Milton Machado Braga | Brazil | did not start | | | |
