= 2022 FINA World Swimming Championships (25 m) – Men's 100 metre individual medley =

Swimming competition

Men's 100 metre individual medley at the 2022 FINA World Swimming Championships (25 m)
- Venue: Melbourne Sports and Aquatic Centre
- Location: Melbourne, Australia
- Dates: 15 December (heats and semifinals); 16 December (final)
- Competitors: 37 from 33 nations
- Winning time: 50.97

Medalists
gold medal	Thomas Ceccon	Italy
silver medal	Javier Acevedo	Canada
bronze medal	Finlay Knox	Canada

The men's 100 metre individual medley competition of the 2022 FINA World Swimming Championships (25 m) was held on 15 and 16 December 2022.

== Records ==
Prior to the competition, the existing world and championship records were as follows:

World record	Caeleb Dressel (USA)	49.28	Budapest, Hungary	November 22, 2020
Competition record	Kliment Kolesnikov (RUS)	50.63	Hangzhou, China	14 December 2018

== Results ==
=== Heats ===
The heats were started on 15 December at 12:12.

Rank	Heat	Lane	Name	Nationality	Time	Notes
1	4	5	Maxime Grousset	France	51.94	Q
2	5	3	Finlay Knox	Canada	51.95	Q
3	5	4	Shaine Casas	United States	51.96	Q
4	3	6	Shuya Matsumoto	Japan	51.99	Q
5	3	4	Javier Acevedo	Canada	52.06	Q
6	5	5	Thomas Ceccon	Italy	52.12	Q
7	4	4	Michael Andrew	United States	52.21	Q
8	4	3	Bernhard Reitshammer	Austria	52.28	Q
9	4	2	Carles Coll	Spain	52.32	Q
10	5	2	Yakov Toumarkin	Israel	52.38	Q
11	3	3	Caio Pumputis	Brazil	52.50	Q
12	5	6	Heiko Gigler	Austria	52.58	Q
12	4	6	Leonardo Coelho Santos	Brazil	52.58	Q
14	3	5	Andreas Vazaios	Greece	52.62	Q
15	3	1	Mikel Schreuders	Aruba	52.65	Q, NR
16	4	7	Markus Lie	Norway	52.77	Q
17	5	7	Ronny Brännkärr	Finland	52.81	
17	2	6	Emre Sakçı	Turkey	52.81	
19	3	2	Clyde Lewis	Australia	52.82	
20	5	8	Nikola Miljenić	Croatia	52.85	
21	4	8	Oskar Hoff	Sweden	53.23	
22	5	1	Ádám Halás	Slovakia	53.43	
23	1	2	Javier Matta	Peru	53.75	NR
24	2	4	Ksawery Masiuk	Poland	54.05	
25	1	4	Josif Miladinov	Bulgaria	54.06	NR
26	4	1	Jan Šefl	Czech Republic	54.11	
27	2	3	Ben Hockin	Paraguay	54.47	
28	3	7	Pan Zhanle	China	54.63	
29	2	2	Simon Haddon	South Africa	54.79	
29	2	5	Maximillian Ang	Singapore	54.79	
31	2	1	Dulyawat Kaewsriyong	Thailand	54.81	NR
32	2	7	Kiran Jasinghe	Sri Lanka	56.61	
33	1	5	Siva Sridhar	India	56.80	
34	1	6	Filipe Gomes	Malawi	58.44	
35	2	8	Abdulhai Ashour	Libya	1:03.95	
36	1	3	Troy Pina	Cape Verde	1:04.65	
	3	8	Wang Hsing-hao	Chinese Taipei	Disqualified	

=== Semifinals ===
The semifinals were started on 15 December at 21:14.

Rank	Heat	Lane	Name	Nationality	Time	Notes
1	2	6	Michael Andrew	United States	51.40	Q
2	2	5	Shaine Casas	United States	51.42	Q
3	2	3	Javier Acevedo	Canada	51.46	Q
4	1	1	Andreas Vazaios	Greece	51.47	Q, NR
5	1	3	Thomas Ceccon	Italy	51.60	Q
6	1	4	Finlay Knox	Canada	51.64	Q
7	1	6	Bernhard Reitshammer	Austria	51.78	Q, NR
8	2	2	Carles Coll	Spain	51.97	Q, NR
9	1	5	Shuya Matsumoto	Japan	51.99	
10	2	1	Heiko Gigler	Austria	52.10	
11	2	7	Caio Pumputis	Brazil	52.12	
12	2	8	Mikel Schreuders	Aruba	52.34	NR
13	1	7	Leonardo Coelho Santos	Brazil	52.37	
14	1	2	Yakov Toumarkin	Israel	52.74	
15	1	8	Markus Lie	Norway	52.93	
	2	4	Maxime Grousset	France	Disqualified	

=== Final ===
The final was held on 16 December at 21:04.

Rank	Lane	Name	Nationality	Time	Notes
1st place, gold medalist(s)	2	Thomas Ceccon	Italy	50.97	
2nd place, silver medalist(s)	3	Javier Acevedo	Canada	51.05	NR
3rd place, bronze medalist(s)	7	Finlay Knox	Canada	51.10	
4	5	Shaine Casas	United States	51.36	
5	4	Michael Andrew	United States	51.47	
6	6	Andreas Vazaios	Greece	51.80	
7	1	Bernhard Reitshammer	Austria	52.01	
8	8	Carles Coll	Spain	52.36	
