= Great Britain at the 1973 World Aquatics Championships =

- Flag of Great Britain
- World Aquatics code: GBR
- National federation: British Swimming
- Website: britishswimming.org

in Belgrade, Yugoslavia
- Medals Ranked 8th: Gold 1 Silver 0 Bronze 1 Total 2

World Aquatics Championships appearances
- 1973; 1975; 1978; 1982; 1986; 1991; 1994; 1998; 2001; 2003; 2005; 2007; 2009; 2011; 2013; 2015; 2017; 2019; 2022; 2023; 2024; 2025

Great Britain competed at the 1973 World Aquatics Championships in Belgrade, Yugoslavia from August 31 to September 9.

== Diving ==
Athlete	Event	Preliminaries		Final	
Athlete	Event	Points	Rank	Points	Rank
Trevor Simpson	Men's springboard	470.04	12	did not advance	
Chris Valls	Men's springboard	437.40	16	did not advance	
Martyn Brown	Men's platform	413.28	16	did not advance	
Frank Dufficy	Men's platform	326.88	21	did not advance	
Alison Drake	Women's springboard	392.94	6 Q	403.50	5
Helen Koppell	Women's springboard	351.21	14	did not advance	
Helen Koppell	Women's platform	302.04	14	did not advance	
Beverly Williams	Women's platform	324.87	12	did not advance	
