= Swimming at the 2022 European Aquatics Championships – Men's 4 × 100 metre medley relay =

Men's 4 × 100 metre medley relay at the 2022 European Aquatics Championships
- Venue: Foro Italico
- Dates: 17 August
- Competitors: 68 from 14 nations
- Teams: 14
- Winning time: 3:28.46

Medalists
gold medal	Thomas Ceccon; Nicolò Martinenghi; Matteo Rivolta; Alessandro Miressi; Michele Lamberti; Federico Poggio; Federico Burdisso; Manuel Frigo	Italy
silver medal	Yohann Ndoye-Brouard; Antoine Viquerat; Clément Secchi; Maxime Grousset; Mewen Tomac; Charles Rihoux	France
bronze medal	Bernhard Reitshammer; Valentin Bayer; Simon Bucher; Heiko Gigler	Austria

The Men's 4 × 100 metre medley relay competition of the 2022 European Aquatics Championships was held on 17 August 2022.

== Records ==
Prior to the competition, the existing world, European and championship records were as follows.

	Team	Time	Location	Date
World record	United States	3:26.78	Tokyo	1 August 2021
European record	Great Britain	3:27.51	Tokyo	1 August 2021
European record	Italy	3:27.51	Budapest	25 June 2022
Championship record	Great Britain	3:28.59	Budapest	23 May 2021

The following new records were set during this competition.

Date	Event	Nation	Time	Record
17 August	Final	Italy	3:28.46	CR

== Results ==
=== Heats ===
The heats were started at 10:11.

Rank	Heat	Lane	Nation	Swimmers	Time	Notes
1	1	2	Italy	Michele Lamberti (54.95); Federico Poggio (59.70); Federico Burdisso (51.37); Manuel Frigo (48.33)	3:34.35	Q
2	2	5	Austria	Bernhard Reitshammer (55.31); Valentin Bayer (59.43); Simon Bucher (51.85); Heiko Gigler (48.23)	3:34.82	Q
3	2	2	Great Britain	Jonathon Marshall (54.67); James Wilby (59.92); Jacob Peters (52.67); Jacob Whittle (48.19)	3:35.45	Q
4	1	4	France	Mewen Tomac (54.72); Antoine Viquerat (1:00.71); Clément Secchi (51.74); Charles Rihoux (48.29)	3:35.46	Q
5	2	0	Poland	Kacper Stokowski (54.09); Dawid Wiekiera (1:00.85); Adrian Jaśkiewicz (52.03); Kamil Sieradzki (49.07)	3:36.04	Q
6	2	8	Ukraine	Oleksandr Zheltyakov (55.10); Volodymyr Lisovets (1:00.36); Denys Kesil (52.49); Sergii Shevtsov (48.74)	3:36.69	Q
7	2	3	Germany	Ole Braunschweig (54.17); Lucas Matzerath (1:00.61); Björn Kammann (53.87); Peter Varjasi (48.30)	3:36.95	Q
8	1	3	Spain	Nicolás García (55.66); Carles Coll (1:01.45); Mario Mollà (52.09); Sergio de Celis (47.89)	3:37.09	Q
9	1	7	Bulgaria	Kaloyan Levterov (55.76); Tonislav Sabev (1:00.82); Antani Ivanov (52.78); Deniel Nankov (48.66)	3:38.02	
10	1	1	Greece	Theodoros Andreopoulos (55.12); Arkadios Aspougalis (1:02.16); Konstantinos Stamou (53.03); Stergios Bilas (49.04)	3:39.35	
11	1	6	Lithuania	Erikas Grigaitis (56.05); Andrius Šidlauskas (1:00.20); Danas Rapšys (53.94); Tomas Navikonis (50.01)	3:40.20	
12	1	5	Sweden	Björn Seeliger (56.59); Daniel Räisänen (1:01.55); Oskar Hoff (53.68); Robin Hanson (49.88)	3:41.70	
13	2	4	Luxembourg	Max Mannes (56.96); Pit Brandenburger (1:04.55); Julien Henx (55.11); Rémi Fabiani (49.72)	3:46.34	
	1	8	Norway	Markus Lie (55.53); Christoffer Haarsaker (1:01.62); Jon Jøntvedt; Nicholas Lia	Disqualified	
	2	1	Ireland		Did not start	
	2	6	Netherlands		Did not start	
	2	7	Switzerland		Did not start	

=== Final ===
The final was held at 19:25.

Rank	Lane	Nation	Swimmers	Time	Notes
1st place, gold medalist(s)	4	Italy	Thomas Ceccon (52.82); Nicolò Martinenghi (57.72); Matteo Rivolta (50.75); Alessandro Miressi (47.17)	3:28.46	CR
2nd place, silver medalist(s)	6	France	Yohann Ndoye-Brouard (53.06); Antoine Viquerat (1:00.48); Clément Secchi (51.53); Maxime Grousset (47.43)	3:32.50	
3rd place, bronze medalist(s)	5	Austria	Bernhard Reitshammer (54.68); Valentin Bayer (59.54); Simon Bucher (50.97); Heiko Gigler (48.09)	3:33.28	
4	3	Great Britain	Luke Greenbank (54.28); James Wilby (59.51); Edward Mildred (51.72); Thomas Dean (48.09)	3:33.60	
5	2	Poland	Ksawery Masiuk (53.49); Dawid Wiekiera (1:00.79); Jakub Majerski (51.17); Karol Ostrowski (48.71)	3:34.16	
6	7	Ukraine	Oleksandr Zheltyakov (54.60); Volodymyr Lisovets (59.40); Denys Kesil (52.12); Sergii Shevtsov (48.54)	3:34.66	NR
7	1	Germany	Ole Braunschweig (54.40); Lucas Matzerath (59.74); Björn Kammann (53.60); Peter Varjasi (47.91)	3:35.65	
8	8	Spain	Nicolás García (55.30); Carles Coll (1:01.31); Mario Mollà (52.20); Sergio de Celis (48.44)	3:37.25	
