= France at the 1973 World Aquatics Championships =

- Flag of France
- World Aquatics code: FRA
- National federation: French Swimming Federation
- Website: ffnatation.fr (in French)

in Belgrade, Yugoslavia
- Medals Ranked =11th: Gold 0 Silver 1 Bronze 0 Total 1

World Aquatics Championships appearances
- 1973; 1975; 1978; 1982; 1986; 1991; 1994; 1998; 2001; 2003; 2005; 2007; 2009; 2011; 2013; 2015; 2017; 2019; 2022; 2023; 2024; 2025

France competed at the 1973 World Aquatics Championships in Belgrade, Yugoslavia from August 31 to September 9.

== Diving ==
Athlete	Event	Preliminaries		Final	
Athlete	Event	Points	Rank	Points	Rank
Alain Goosen	Men's springboard	395.14	19	did not advance	
Jacques Deschouwer	Men's platform	442.08	12	did not advance	
