= Swimming at the 2024 European Aquatics Championships – Men's 400 metre freestyle =

Men's 400 metre freestyle at the 2024 European Aquatics Championships
- Venue: Sports Centre Milan Gale Muškatirović
- Dates: 23 June
- Competitors: 33 from 21 nations
- Winning time: 3:43.24

Medalists
gold medal	Felix Auböck	Austria
silver medal	Dimitrios Markos	Greece
bronze medal	Antonio Djakovic	Switzerland

The Men's 400 metre freestyle competition of the 2024 European Aquatics Championships was held on 23 June 2024.

== Records ==
Prior to the competition, the existing world, European and championship records were as follows.

	Name	Nationality	Time	Location	Date
World record	Paul Biedermann	Germany	3:40.07	Rome	26 July 2009
European record	Paul Biedermann	Germany	3:40.07	Rome	26 July 2009
Championship record	Lukas Märtens	Germany	3:42.50	Rome	17 August 2022

== Results ==
=== Heats ===
The heats were started at 09:48.
Qualification Rules: The 8 fastest from the heats qualify to the final.

Rank	Heat	Lane	Name	Nationality	Time	Notes
1	4	4	Felix Auböck	Austria	3:48.86	Q
2	3	5	Bar Soloveychik	Israel	3:49.92	Q
3	3	4	Antonio Djakovic	Switzerland	3:49.99	Q
4	3	6	Krzysztof Chmielewski	Poland	3:50.20	Q
5	4	2	Dimitrios Markos	Greece	3:51.33	Q
6	4	5	Danas Rapšys	Lithuania	3:51.57	Q
7	4	6	Jon Jøntvedt	Norway	3:51.73	Q
8	3	7	Ondrej Gemov	Czech Republic	3:53.11	Q
9	4	7	Jovan Lekić	Bosnia and Herzegovina	3:53.49	
10	3	2	Yordan Yanchev	Bulgaria	3:54.10	
11	3	9	Nikola Ratkov	Serbia	3:54.62	
12	2	6	Loris Bianchi	San Marino	3:55.89	NR
13	3	1	Romano Yoav	Israel	3:57.58	
14	2	5	Pavel Alovatki	Moldova	3:57.80	
15	2	3	Nikola Simic	Serbia	4:00.14	
16	1	2	Heorhii Lukashev	Ukraine	4:00.20	
17	1	6	Kevin Pereira Teixeira	Andorra	4:00.29	NR
18	2	9	Michał Chmielewski	Poland	4:00.31	
19	2	2	Michal Judickij	Czech Republic	4:00.70	
20	3	8	Sašo Boškan	Slovenia	4:00.85	
21	1	4	Filip Kuruzovic	Bosnia and Herzegovina	4:00.93	
22	2	4	Kenan Dračić	Bosnia and Herzegovina	4:00.97	
23	2	0	Moritz Baumgartner	Austria	4:01.12	
24	4	9	Cormac Rynn	Ireland	4:01.51	
25	2	7	Mihailo Gasic	Serbia	4:03.02	
26	2	8	Arne Furlan Štular	Slovenia	4:04.20	
27	4	0	László Gálicz	Hungary	4:04.80	
28	1	5	Nikola Ǵuretanoviḱ	North Macedonia	4:09.03	
	1	7	Tomas Koski	Finland	DNS	
	2	1	Robin Hanson	Sweden	DNS	
	3	3	Balázs Holló	Hungary	DNS	
	4	3	Zalán Sárkány	Hungary	DNS	
	4	8	Velimir Stjepanović	Serbia	DNS	

=== Final ===
The final will be held at 19:23.

Rank	Lane	Name	Nationality	Time	Notes
1st place, gold medalist(s)	4	Felix Auböck	Austria	3:43.24	NR
2nd place, silver medalist(s)	2	Dimitrios Markos	Greece	3:47.44	NR
3rd place, bronze medalist(s)	3	Antonio Djakovic	Switzerland	3:47.62	
4	7	Danas Rapšys	Lithuania	3:47.87	
5	5	Bar Soloveychik	Israel	3:48.47	
6	6	Krzysztof Chmielewski	Poland	3:50.24	
7	8	Ondrej Gemov	Czech Republic	3:51.46	
8	1	Jon Jøntvedt	Norway	3:53.79	
