= 2021 FINA World Swimming Championships (25 m) – Men's 400 metre freestyle =

Swimming competition

Men's 400 metre freestyle at the 2021 FINA World Swimming Championships (25 m)
- Venue: Etihad Arena
- Location: Abu Dhabi, United Arab Emirates
- Dates: 16 December (heats and final)
- Competitors: 63 from 54 nations
- Winning time: 3:35.90

Medalists
gold medal	Felix Auböck	Austria
silver medal	Danas Rapšys	Lithuania
bronze medal	Antonio Djakovic	Switzerland

The Men's 400 metre freestyle competition of the 2021 FINA World Swimming Championships (25 m) was held on 16 December 2021.

== Records ==
Prior to the competition, the existing world and championship records were as follows.

World record	Yannick Agnel (FRA)	3:32.25	Angers, France	15 November 2012
Competition record	Danas Rapšys (LTU)	3:34.01	Hangzhou, China	11 December 2018

== Results ==
=== Heats ===
The heats were started at 09:30.

Rank	Heat	Lane	Name	Nationality	Time	Notes
1	7	5	Felix Auböck	Austria	3:37.91	Q
2	5	7	Kieran Smith	United States	3:38.61	Q
3	7	7	Antonio Djakovic	Switzerland	3:39.06	Q, NR
4	6	5	Luc Kroon	Netherlands	3:39.17	Q
5	7	2	Max Litchfield	Great Britain	3:39.34	Q
6	7	4	Danas Rapšys	Lithuania	3:39.38	Q
7	4	6	Alfonso Mestre	Venezuela	3:39.52	Q, NR
8	6	3	Marco De Tullio	Italy	3:39.53	Q
9	7	3	Matteo Ciampi	Italy	3:40.10	
10	6	0	Ahmed Hafnaoui	Tunisia	3:40.30	
11	7	6	Balázs Holló	Hungary	3:41.75	
12	7	8	Maarten Brzoskowski	Netherlands	3:41.84	
13	6	6	Henrik Christiansen	Norway	3:42.03	
14	4	3	Marwan Elkamash	Egypt	3:42.17	
15	6	4	Tom Dean	Great Britain	3:42.41	
16	6	2	Daniil Shatalov	Russian Swimming Federation	3:42.50	
17	5	8	José Paulo Lopes	Portugal	3:42.57	NR
18	4	4	Denis Loktev	Israel	3:43.27	
19	5	4	Lee Ho-joon	South Korea	3:43.35	
20	6	7	Jordan Pothain	France	3:43.43	
21	7	1	Velimir Stjepanović	Serbia	3:43.58	
22	5	1	Lukas Märtens	Germany	3:43.64	
23	4	1	Nguyễn Huy Hoàng	Vietnam	3:43.89	NR
24	3	5	Juan Morales	Colombia	3:44.00	NR
25	4	5	Gábor Zombori	Hungary	3:44.23	
26	5	0	Dimitrios Markos	Greece	3:44.83	
27	5	6	Aleksandr Egorov	Russian Swimming Federation	3:44.90	
28	6	1	Stefan Šorak	Serbia	3:45.01	
29	6	8	Baturalp Ünlü	Turkey	3:45.66	
30	7	9	Ondřej Gemov	Czech Republic	3:45.74	
31	5	2	Henning Mühlleitner	Germany	3:46.05	
32	4	7	David Popovici	Romania	3:46.08	
33	3	2	Eduardo Cisternas	Chile	3:46.43	NR
34	4	8	Chen Ende	China	3:46.61	
35	5	3	Jan Micka	Czech Republic	3:46.68	
36	4	0	Cheuk Ming Ho	Hong Kong	3:47.51	NR
37	5	5	Joaquín Vargas	Peru	3:48.05	
38	4	2	Thomas Thijs	Belgium	3:48.07	
39	7	0	Yordan Yanchev	Bulgaria	3:48.12	
40	3	4	Tonnam Kanteemool	Thailand	3:49.01	NR
41	3	6	Kushagra Rawat	India	3:49.04	NR
42	3	3	Aflah Prawira	Indonesia	3:49.13	NR
43	6	9	Mohamed Lagili	Tunisia	3:50.73	
44	3	1	Mohamed Anisse Djaballah	Algeria	3:52.01	
45	4	9	Finn McGeever	Ireland	3:52.34	
46	3	7	Irakli Revishvili	Georgia	3:53.62	
47	3	0	Adib Khalil	Lebanon	3:53.64	NR
48	3	9	Omar Abbas	Syria	3:53.66	NR
49	2	3	Loris Bianchi	San Marino	3:55.50	NR
50	2	4	Pavel Alovatki	Moldova	3:55.55	
51	2	5	Joseph Macías	Ecuador	3:57.51	
52	1	3	Adrián Navarro	Cuba	3:58.31	
53	3	8	Dylan Cachia	Malta	3:59.11	
54	2	1	Ado Gargović	Montenegro	3:59.93	NR
55	2	9	Ramazan Omarov	Kyrgyzstan	4:02.67	
56	2	6	Nikoli Blackman	Trinidad and Tobago	4:03.35	
57	2	7	Henrique Mascarenhas	Angola	4:04.23	
58	2	2	Johan Nónskarð Dam	Faroe Islands	4:04.95	
59	2	0	Christopher Gossmann	Guatemala	4:06.06	
60	1	5	Sauod Al-Shamroukh	Kuwait	4:09.83	
61	2	8	Ahmed Ali Al-Hazmi	Saudi Arabia	4:12.13	
62	1	4	Ali Imaam	Maldives	4:24.45	NR
	1	6	Mark Imazu	Guam	DSQ	
	1	2	Tesfaye Beyene	Eritrea	DNS	
	5	9	Glen Lim Jun Wei	Singapore	DNS	

=== Final ===
The final was held at 18:00.

Rank	Lane	Name	Nationality	Time	Notes
1st place, gold medalist(s)	4	Felix Auböck	Austria	3:35.90	NR
2nd place, silver medalist(s)	7	Danas Rapšys	Lithuania	3:36.23	
3rd place, bronze medalist(s)	3	Antonio Djakovic	Switzerland	3:36.83	NR
4	8	Marco De Tullio	Italy	3:37.83	
5	5	Kieran Smith	United States	3:38.77	
6	6	Luc Kroon	Netherlands	3:39.03	
7	1	Alfonso Mestre	Venezuela	3:39.06	NR
8	2	Max Litchfield	Great Britain	3:39.45	
