= Niki Stajković =

Austrian diver

Personal information
- Born: 1 March 1959 Salzburg, Austria
- Died: 17 February 2017 (aged 57) Hallein, Austria

Sport
- Sport: Diving
Medal record
Representing Austria
European Championships
Silver medal – second place	1987 Strasbourg	3 m springboard
Bronze medal – third place	1981 Split	3 m springboard

Nikola "Niki" Stajković (1 March 1959 in Salzburg – 17 February 2017 in Hallein) was an Austrian diver who competed at five Olympics between 1972 and 1992 (1984 excepted). His best position was eighth at the 1980 Olympics. He became one of the youngest Olympic competitors ever when he made his Olympic debut in 1972 at the age of thirteen.

On 17 February 2017 Niki was found dead at the bottom of a pool, after undertaking a training session with his wife, who had left early.

He was sporting director for the Red Bull Cliff Diving Series.
