= Cornelia Pammer =

Austrian swimmer

Personal information
- Nationality: Austrian
- Born: 9 July 2000 (age 26)

Sport
- Sport: Swimming

Cornelia Pammer (born 9 July 2000) is an Austrian swimmer. She competed in the women's 50 metre breaststroke event at the 2018 FINA World Swimming Championships (25 m), in Hangzhou, China.
