= Jacques Deschouwer =

French diver

Personal information
- Nationality: French
- Born: 28 February 1946 (age 79)

Sport
- Sport: Diving

Jacques Deschouwer (born 28 February 1946) is a French diver. He competed in the men's 10 metre platform event at the 1972 Summer Olympics.
