= Alain Goosen =

French diver (born 1948)

Personal information
- Nationality: French
- Born: 26 January 1948 (age 77)

Sport
- Sport: Diving

Alain Goosen (born 26 January 1948) is a French diver. He competed at the 1972 Summer Olympics and the 1976 Summer Olympics.
