= Teresa Andersen =

American synchronized swimmer

Personal information
- Born: 1953 (age 72–73) Santa Clara, California, United States

Sport
- Sport: Synchronised swimming
Medal record
Representing United States
World Championships
Gold medal – first place	1973 Belgrade	Solo
Gold medal – first place	1973 Belgrade	Duet
Gold medal – first place	1973 Belgrade	Team

Teresa "Terry" Andersen (born c. 1953) is a retired American synchronized swimmer who won all three gold medals at the 1973 World Aquatics Championships, in the solo, duet and team routines. This feat was repeated only in 1986 by Carolyn Waldo. Also in 1986, Andersen was inducted to the International Swimming Hall of Fame.

== Biography ==
Andersen started swimming at the age of 10. By the mid-1970s, she dominated American synchronized swimming, winning junior US titles in the duet (1970) and solo (1971) routines; senior US titles in the indoor team (1969, 1972, 1973), indoor solo (1973), indoor duet (1973), outdoor team (1969–1973), and outdoor duet competitions (1972, 1973); as well as Canadian Open Championships in 1972 (solo, duet, figures, team). After clean-sweeping the gold medals at the 1973 World Aquatics Championships, she retired to become the head coach of the West German National Team (1974) and then a state coach in South Africa (1976, 1979). Before retiring, she helped popularize synchronized swimming via exhibitions at Expo 1970 and the 1972 Olympics. Next year the sport was introduced to the FINA World Aquatics Championships, and in 1984 to the Summer Olympics.

== See also ==
- List of members of the International Swimming Hall of Fame
