= Jorge Head =

Spanish diver

Personal information
- Nationality: Spanish
- Born: 27 July 1949 (age 75); Lisbon, Portugal

Sport
- Sport: Diving

Jorge Head (born 27 July 1949) is a Spanish diver. He competed in the men's 10 metre platform event at the 1972 Summer Olympics.
