= Martyn Brown =

British diver

Personal information
- Nationality: England
- Born: 21 June 1953 (age 72) Stevenage

Sport
- Country: Great Britain
- Sport: Diving

Martyn Brown (born 21 June 1953) is a male former diver who competed for Great Britain and England.

== Diving career ==
Brown represented Great Britain at the 1976 Summer Olympics and the 1980 Summer Olympics.

He also represented England in the 10 metres platform, at the 1974 British Commonwealth Games in Christchurch, New Zealand. Four years later he competed again for England in both the platform and springboard events, at the 1978 Commonwealth Games in Edmonton, Alberta, Canada.
