= Frank Dufficy =

British diver

Personal information
- Nationality: British
- Born: 11 June 1953 (age 72) Hitchin, England

Sport
- Sport: Diving

Frank Dufficy (born 11 June 1953) is a British diver. He competed in the men's 10 metre platform event at the 1972 Summer Olympics.
