= Claudia Hufnagl =

Austrian swimmer

Personal information
- Nationality: Austrian
- Born: 20 May 1996 (age 30)

Sport
- Sport: Swimming

Claudia Hufnagl (born 20 May 1996) is an Austrian swimmer. She competed in the women's 200 metre butterfly event at the 2018 FINA World Swimming Championships (25 m), in Hangzhou, China.
