= Birgit Koschischek =

Austrian swimmer

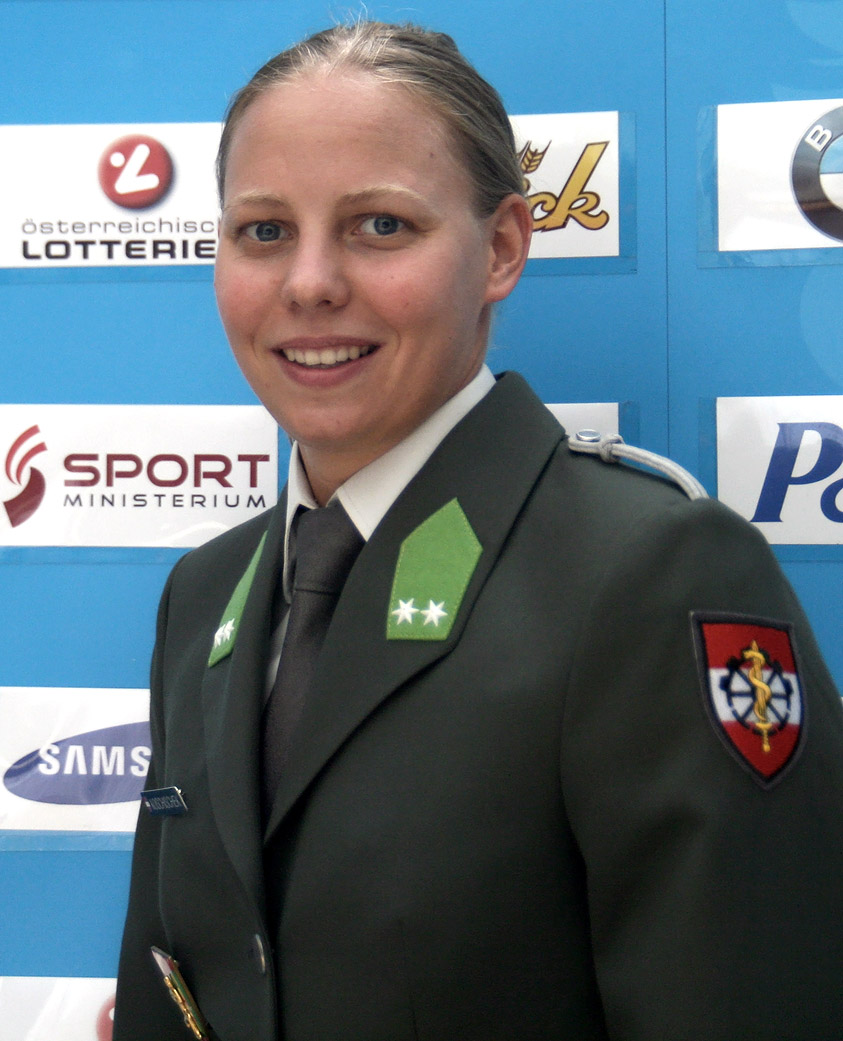

Personal information
- Nationality: Austria
- Born: 22 May 1987 (age 39) Vienna, Austria
- Height: 1.69 m (5 ft 6 1/2 in)
- Weight: 60 kg (132 lb)

Sport
- Sport: Swimming
- Strokes: Freestyle, butterfly
- Club: SV Schwechat
- Coach: Adam Thoroczkay

Birgit Koschischek (born 22 May 1987 in Vienna) is an Austrian swimmer, who specialized in sprint freestyle and butterfly events. She is a two-time Olympian, a four-time Austrian long and short course record holder, and a member of Schwechat Swimming Club (German: Schwimmverein Schwechat) in Schwechat, under her personal coach Adam Thoroczkay.

== Swimming career ==
Koschischek made her international debut at the 2007 Military World Games in Hyderabad, India, where she earned a bronze medal in the 100 m freestyle by one tenth of a second (0.10) behind Romania's Camelia Potec, posting her time at 57.62 seconds. In 2008, Koschischek reached the semifinals of the freestyle and butterfly (both 100 m) at the European Championships in Eindhoven, Netherlands, with respective times of 56.15 and 59.61. Having cleared FINA B-cuts in both events, she guaranteed a spot on the Austrian swimming team for the Olympics.

Koschischek represented Austria at the 2008 Summer Olympics in Beijing, where she qualified for two swimming events. On the first night of the Games, Koschischek won the third heat of the 100 m butterfly, by 0.28 of a second ahead of Hong Kong's Hannah Wilson in an Austrian record of 59.07, but she missed out the semifinals by 0.58-second deficit, as she placed twenty-sixth out of 69 swimmers in the preliminaries. In the 100 m freestyle, Koschischek posted a lifetime best and another Austrian record of 55.62. She raced to third place and twenty-ninth overall by a hundredth of a second (0.01) behind Arianna Vanderpool-Wallace of the Bahamas.

Shortly after the Olympics, Koschischek broke two more national records in the same events at the 2008 European Short Course Swimming Championships in Rijeka, Croatia, with a time of 53.67 and 57.42 seconds, respectively. She also achieved an eighth-place finish, and eventually added her fifth-career Austrian record (2:07.46) in the women's 200 m butterfly at the 2011 European Short Course Swimming Championships in Szczecin, Poland.

Four years after competing in her first Olympics, Koschischek qualified for her second Austrian team, as a 25-year-old, at the 2012 Summer Olympics in London, by attaining a B-standard entry time of 58.80 seconds in the women's 100 m butterfly. She challenged seven other swimmers on the third heat again, including former Olympic champion Otylia Jędrzejczak of Poland. She came only in last place by one tenth of a second (0.10) behind Portugal's Sara Oliveira, outside her national record time of 1:00.54. Koschischek, however, failed to advance into the semifinals, as she placed thirty-seventh out of 42 swimmers in the preliminary heats.
