= Valentin Bayer =

Austrian swimmer (born 1999)

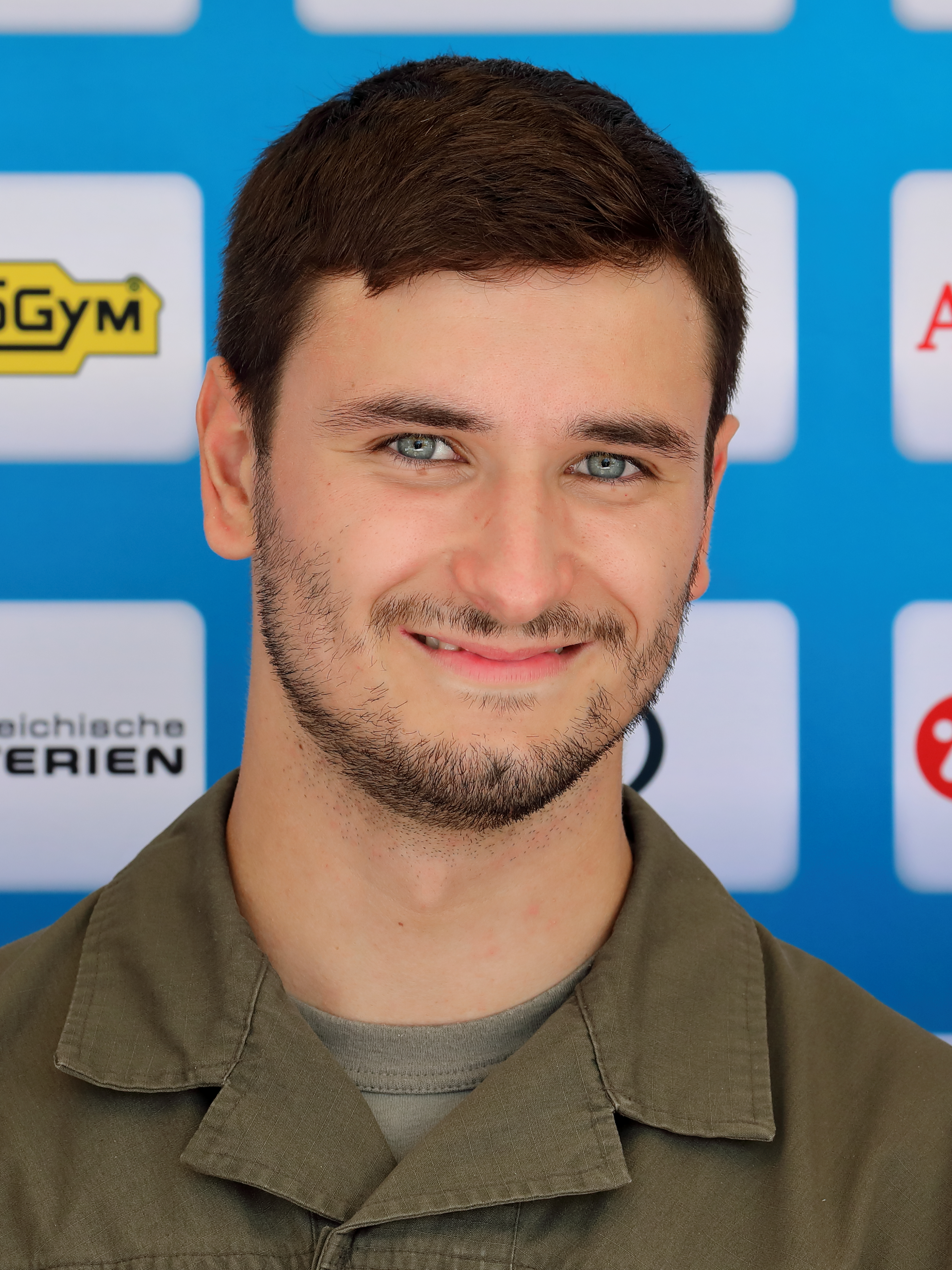

Personal information
- Born: 8 December 1999 (age 26)

Sport
- Sport: Swimming
Medal record
Representing Austria
European Championships (LC)
Bronze medal – third place	2022 Rome	4×100 m medley

Valentin Bayer (born 8 December 1999) is an Austrian swimmer. He represented Austria at the 2019 World Aquatics Championships in Gwangju, South Korea. He competed in the men's 100 metre breaststroke and men's 200 metre breaststroke events.

In 2017, he won the silver medal in the boys' 200 m breaststroke at the European Junior Swimming Championships held in Netanya, Israel.

In 2020, he set a new Austrian record in the men's 100 metre breaststroke at the inaugural 4 Nations Meet held in Budapest, Hungary.

Bayer competed in the men's 4 × 100 metre medley relay event at the 2024 Summer Olympics held in Paris, France.
