= David Brandl =

Austrian swimmer (born 1987)

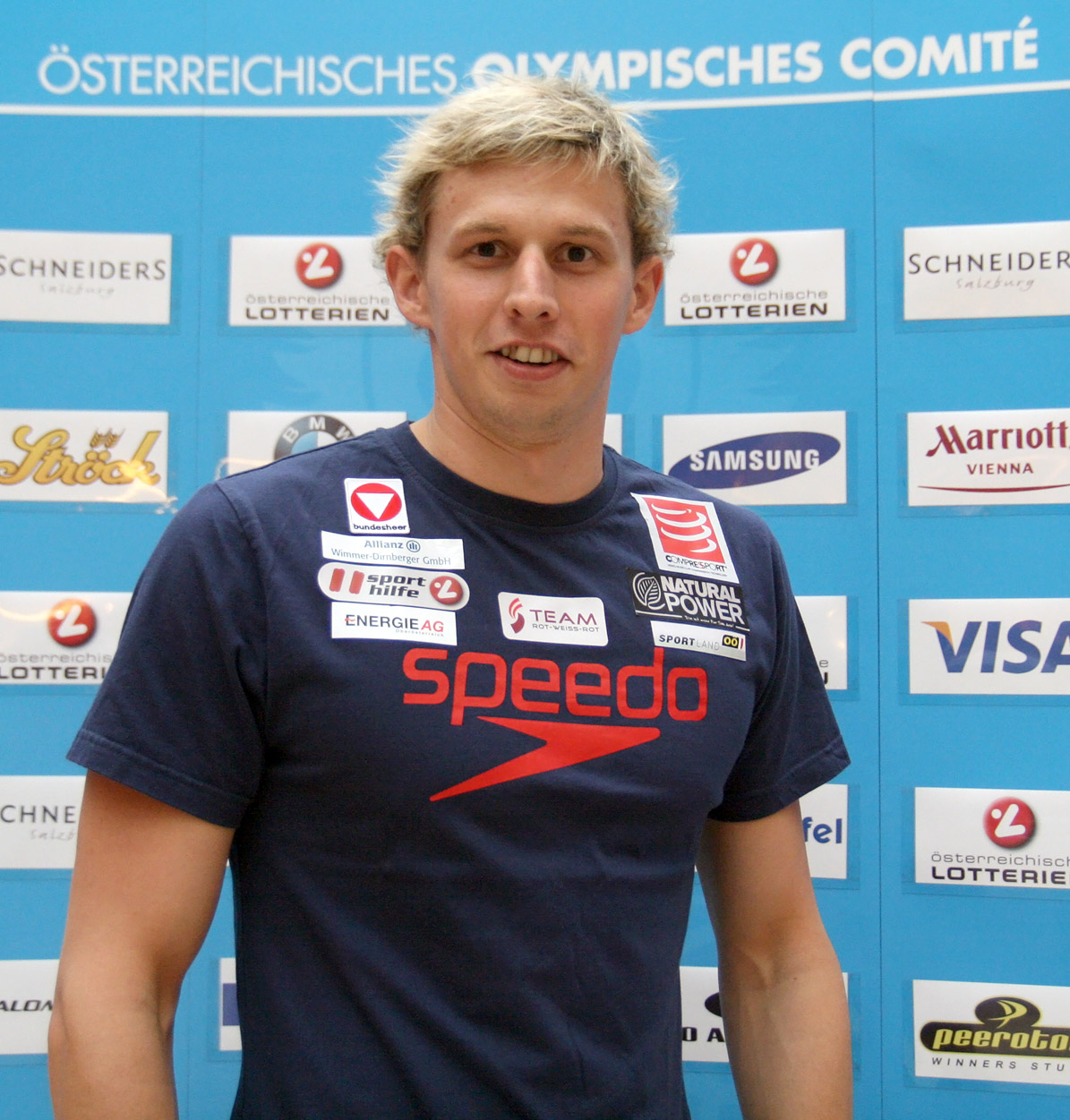

Personal information
- Full name: David Karl Brandl
- National team: Austria
- Born: 19 April 1987 (age 39) Linz, Austria
- Height: 1.86 m (6 ft 1 in)
- Weight: 83 kg (183 lb)

Sport
- Sport: Swimming
- Strokes: Freestyle
- Club: Perger SV
- Coach: Helge Gödecke
Medal record
Men's swimming
Representing Austria
European Championships
Bronze medal – third place	2008 Eindhoven	4×200 m freestyle

David Karl Brandl (born 19 April 1987) is an Austrian swimmer, who specialized in freestyle events. He is a multiple-time Austrian champion, a four-time national record holder, and a current member of Perger Swimming Club (German: Perger Schwimmverein) in Perg. He also won a bronze medal, as a member of the Austrian swimming team, at the 2008 European Championships in Eindhoven, Netherlands.

== Swimming career ==
Brandl qualified for the men's 400 m freestyle at the 2008 Summer Olympics in Beijing, by attaining a B-standard entry time of 3:51.35 from the Austrian Swimming Championships, coincidentally in his home city Linz. He won the second heat by twenty-one hundredths of a second (0.21) ahead of France's Sébastien Rouault, with an Austrian record-breaking time of 3:48.63. Brandl, however, failed to advance into the final, as he placed twentieth out of 37 swimmers in the evening preliminaries. Three days later, Brandl swam on the second leg of the men's 4 × 200 m freestyle relay, recording his fastest individual-split time of 1:46.45. Brandl and his teammates Markus Rogan, Dominik Koll, and Florian Janistyn finished heat two in fifth place and ninth overall, for another Austrian record time of 7:11.45.

At the 2009 FINA World Championships in Rome, Italy, Brandl set an Austrian record in the 400 m freestyle, lowering his time to 3:47.61. The following year, Brandl achieved a fifth-place finish in the same event at the 2010 European Short Course Swimming Championships in Eindhoven, Netherlands, posting his best career time of 3:44.33.

At the 2011 FINA World Championships in Shanghai, China, Brandl competed in two long-distance freestyle events, but achieved a slightly fair swimming performance. He finished twenty-fifth in the 400 m freestyle, and twenty-second in the 800 m freestyle, posting his slowest possible time of 3:54.73 and 8:05.66, respectively.

Four years after competing in his first Olympics, Brandl qualified for his second Austrian team, as a 25-year-old, at the 2012 Summer Olympics in London, by attaining a B-standard time of 1:48.95 in the men's 200 m freestyle. He challenged seven other competitors on the third heat of his only individual event, including Canada's Blake Worsley and Israel's Nimrod Shapira Bar-Or. He came only in fifth place by 0.68 of a second ahead of Tunisia's Ahmed Mathlouthi, with a time of 1:49.00. Brandl, however, failed to advance into the semifinals, as he placed twenty-seventh out of 41 swimmers in the morning's preliminary heats. Two days later, Brandl reunited with his teammates Rogan, Janistyn, and Christian Scherübl for the men's 4 × 200 m freestyle relay. Swimming the lead-off leg, Brandl recorded a time of 1:49.80, and the Austrian team went on to finish heat two in eighth place and sixteenth overall, for a total time of 7:17.94.
