= Lena Kreundl =

Austrian swimmer (born 1997)

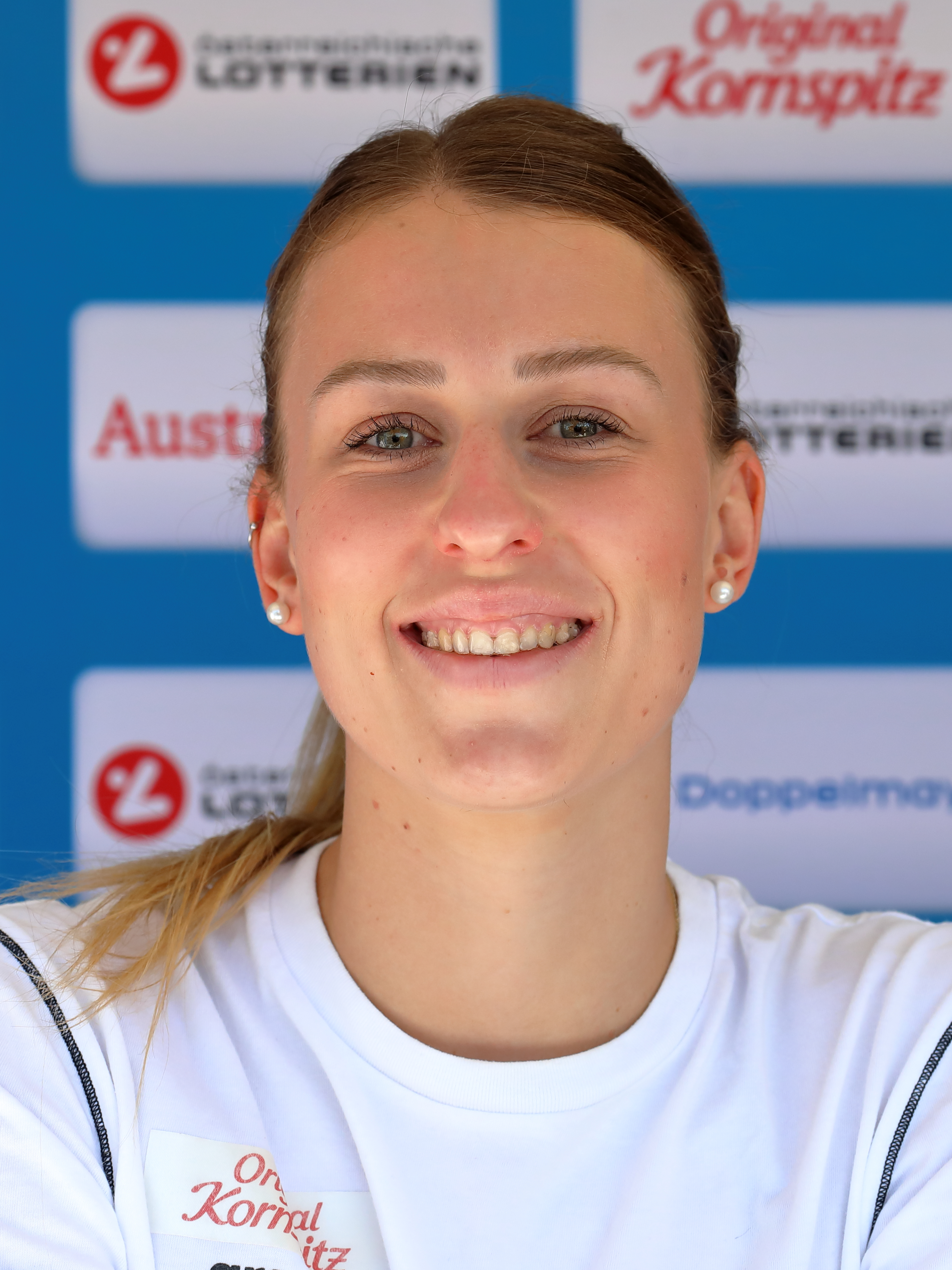
- Kreundl in 2024

Personal information
- Born: 19 December 1997 (age 27); Steyr, Austria

Sport
- Sport: Swimming

Lena Kreundl (born 19 December 1997) is an Austrian swimmer. She competed in the women's 200 metre individual medley event at the 2016 Summer Olympics. In 2014, she represented Austria at the 2014 Summer Youth Olympics held in Nanjing, China.

== See also ==
- List of European Short Course Swimming Championships medalists (women)
