= Simon Bucher =

Austrian swimmer

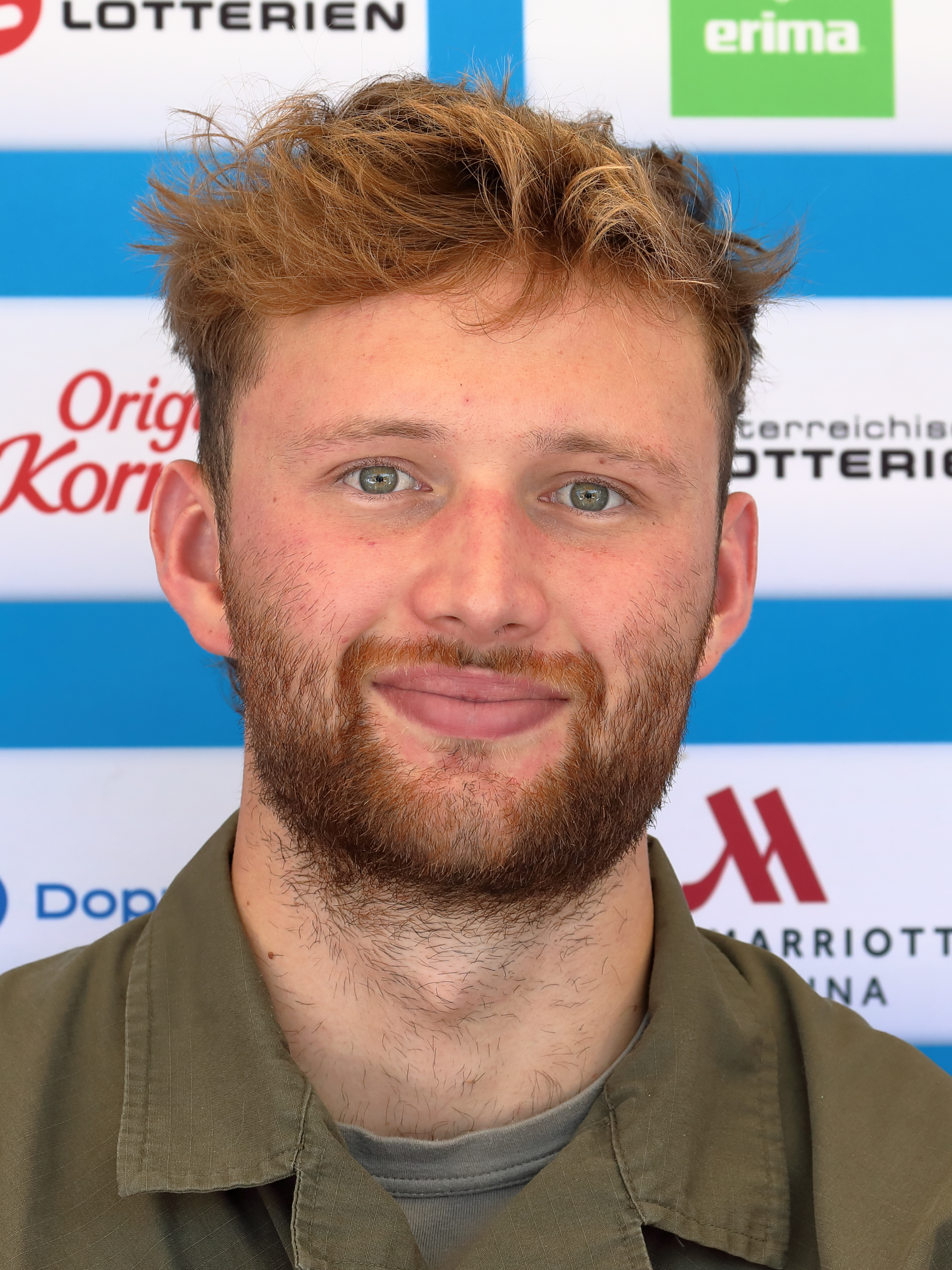

Personal information
- Nationality: Austrian
- Born: 23 May 2000 (age 26) Innsbruck, Austria
- Height: 1.87 m (6 ft 2 in)
- Weight: 77 kg (170 lb)

Sport
- Sport: Swimming
Medal record
Men's swimming
Representing Austria
World Championships (LC)
Silver medal – second place	2024 Doha	100 m butterfly
European Championships (LC)
Silver medal – second place	2024 Belgrade	50 m butterfly
Bronze medal – third place	2022 Rome	4×100 m medley

Simon Bucher (born 23 May 2000) is an Austrian swimmer. He competed in the 2020 Summer Olympics in the 100m butterfly event, but did not advance from the preliminary round. He competed in the same event at the 2024 Summer Olympics where he qualified for the semifinals and then in the event at the 2025 World Aquatics Championships he made the final.
