= Bernhard Reitshammer =

Austrian swimmer (born 1994)

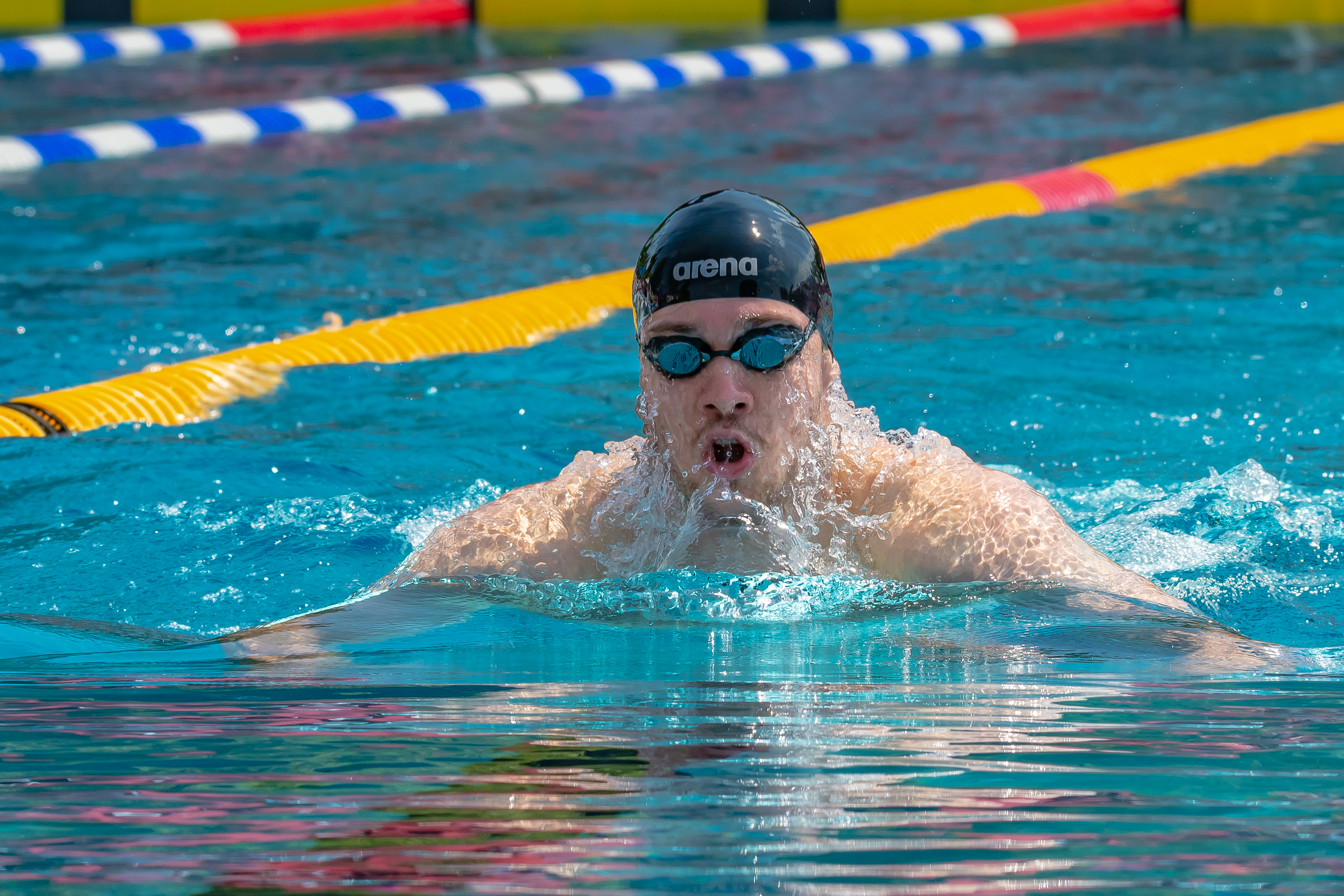

Personal information
- Born: 17 June 1994 (age 32) Innsbruck, Austria
- Height: 1.87 m (6 ft 2 in)

Sport
- Sport: Swimming
Medal record
Men's swimming
Representing Austria
World Championships (SC)
Silver medal – second place	2024 Budapest	100 m medley
European Championships (LC)
Bronze medal – third place	2022 Rome	4×100 m medley
European Championships (SC)
Gold medal – first place	2023 Otopeni	100 m medley
Bronze medal – third place	2021 Kazan	100 m medley

Bernhard Reitshammer (born 17 June 1994) is an Austrian swimmer. He has represented Austria at two Olympic Games.

In April 2021, Reitshammer qualified to represent Austria at the 2020 Summer Olympics in Tokyo, Japan, where he went on to compete in the 100 metre backstroke, 100 metre breaststroke and 200 metre individual medley events.

He also qualified to compete at the 2024 Summer Olympics in Paris, France. He reached the semifinals in the 100 m backstroke. He also participated in the 100 m backstroke and the 4x100 medley relay.

He represented Austria at the 2019 World Aquatics Championships held in Gwangju, South Korea and he finished in 49th place in the heats in the men's 50 metre freestyle event. He represented Austria at the 2022 World Aquatics Championships held in Budapest, Hungary, the 2023 World Aquatics Championships in Fukuoka, Japan, and the 2024 World Aquatics Championships in Doha, Qatar.

At the 2022 European Aquatics Championships in Rome, Italy he placed third with the Austrian team in the men's 4 × 100 m medley relay. At the 2023 European Short Course Swimming Championships he won gold in the 100 m medley.

He studied at the University of Innsbruck.
