= Heiko Gigler =

Austrian swimmer (born 1996)

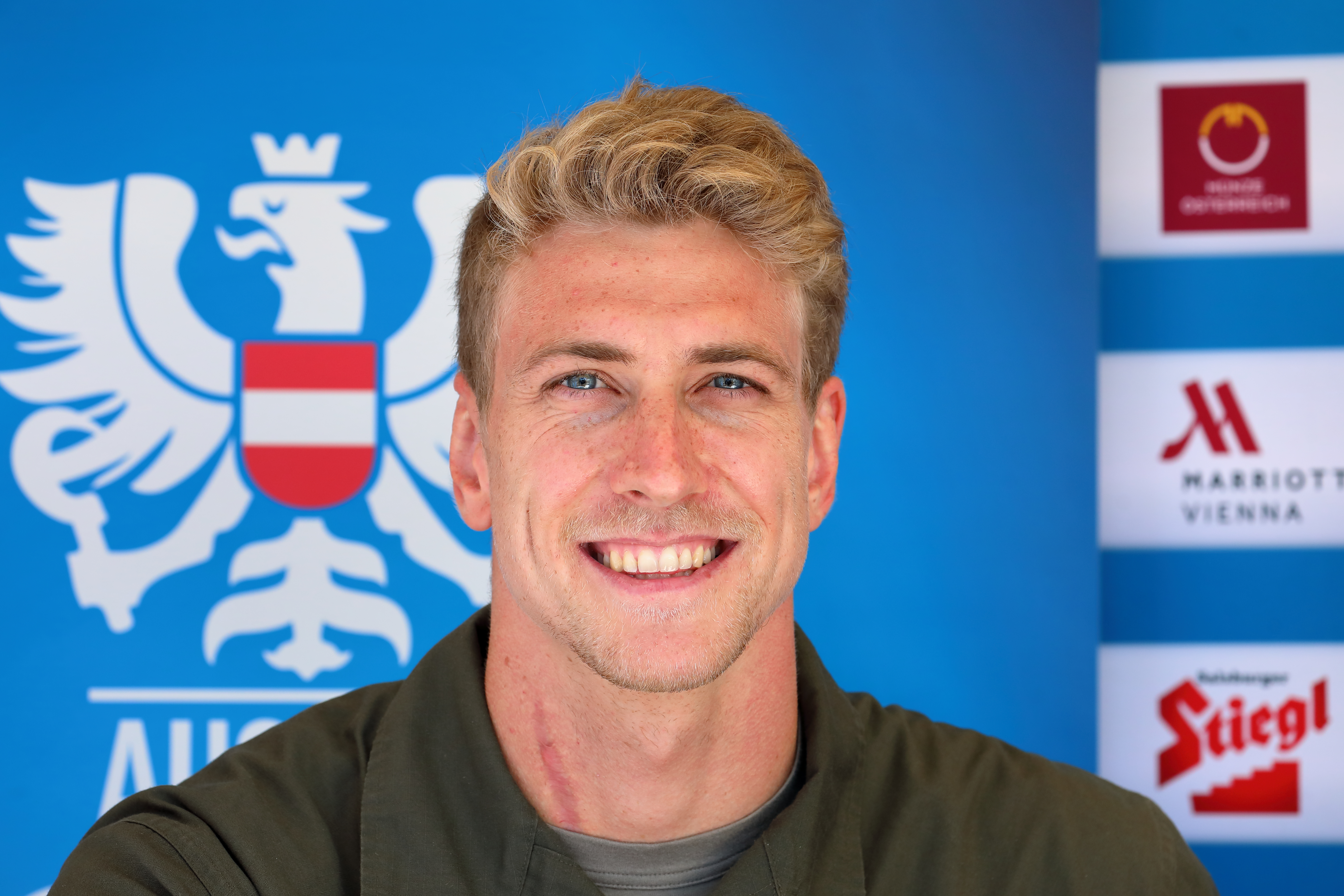

Personal information
- Nationality: Austrian
- Born: 17 June 1996 (age 30) Spittal an der Drau
- Height: 1.98 m (6 ft 6 in)

Sport
- Sport: Swimming
Medal record
Men's swimming
Representing Austria
European Championships (LC)
Bronze medal – third place	2022 Rome	4×100 m medley
European Championships (SC)
Bronze medal – third place	2025 Lublin	100 m medley

Heiko Gigler (born 17 June 1996) is an Austrian swimmer. He competed in the men's 50 metre butterfly event at the 2018 FINA World Swimming Championships (25 m), in Hangzhou, China. Gigler competed for Austria at the 2020 Summer Olympics in Tokyo, in the Men's 50 metre freestyle event, but did not advance from the preliminary round.
