= Felix Auböck =

Austrian swimmer (born 1996)

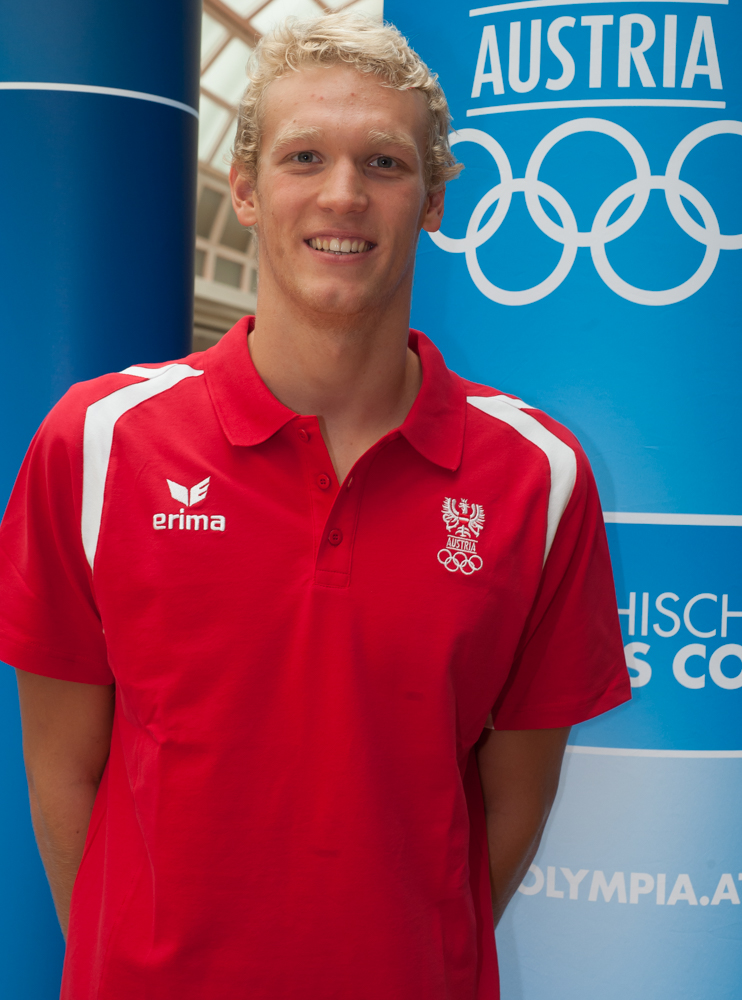
- Auböck in 2016

Personal information
- Born: 19 December 1996 (age 29) Bad Vöslau, Austria
- Height: 1.98 m (6 ft 6 in)
- Weight: 85 kg (187 lb)

Sport
- Sport: Swimming
- Strokes: Freestyle
- College team: University of Michigan
Medal record
Men's swimming
Representing Austria
World Championships (SC)
Gold medal – first place	2021 Abu Dhabi	400 m freestyle
European Championships (LC)
Gold medal – first place	2024 Belgrade	400 m freestyle
Silver medal – second place	2020 Budapest	400 m freestyle
Bronze medal – third place	2022 Rome	200 m freestyle

Felix Otto Auböck (also spelled Auboeck, born 19 December 1996) is a retired Austrian swimmer. Felix is the current World Champion in the 400 metre freestyle short course as well as a three time Olympic Finalist, including a 4th Place finish at the 2020 Tokyo Olympics. Previously He competed in the men's 400 metre freestyle event at the 2016 Summer Olympics. In 2019, he competed in three events at the 2019 World Aquatics Championships held in Gwangju, South Korea.

In 2020, Auboeck swam for the New York Breakers in the International Swimming League in Budapest. Auboeck represented Austria again at the 2020 Summer Olympics in Tokyo, competing in the 400 m, 800 m and 1500 m freestyle events.
