= Austria at the 2011 World Aquatics Championships =

Sporting event delegation

Flag of Austria

Austria competed at the 2011 World Aquatics Championships in Shanghai, China between July 16 and 31, 2011.

== Diving ==
Austria qualified 2 athletes in diving.

Men

Athlete	Event	Preliminary		Semifinals		Final	
Athlete	Event	Points	Rank	Points	Rank	Points	Rank
Constantin Blaha	Men's 1m Springboard	287.95	30			did not advance	
Constantin Blaha	Men's 3m Springboard	392.90	19	did not advance			

Women

Athlete	Event	Preliminary		Semifinals		Final	
Athlete	Event	Points	Rank	Points	Rank	Points	Rank
Sophie Somloi	Women's 1m Springboard	249.45	15			did not advance	
Sophie Somloi	Women's 3m Springboard	260.60	26	did not advance			

== Swimming ==
Austria qualified 12 swimmers.

Men

Athlete	Event	Heats		Semifinals		Final	
Athlete	Event	Time	Rank	Time	Rank	Time	Rank
Markus Rogan	Men's 200m Freestyle	1:48.82	21	did not advance			
Markus Rogan	Men's 200m IM	1:59.22	5 Q	1:57.74	4 Q	1:58.14	5
David Brandl	Men's 400m Freestyle	3:54.73	25			did not advance	
David Brandl	Men's 800m Freestyle	8:05.66	22			did not advance	
Florian Janistyn	Men's 800m Freestyle	8:12.90	33			did not advance	
Sebastian Stoss	Men's 200m Backstroke	2:01.13	26	did not advance			
Hunor Mate	Men's 100m Breaststroke	1:01.88	39	did not advance			
Hunor Mate	Men's 200m Breaststroke	2:15.45	32	did not advance			
Dinko Jukic	Men's 200m Butterfly	1:55.26	1 Q	1:54.94	4 Q	1:55.48	7
Dinko Jukic	Men's 200m IM	DNS		did not advance			
Dinko Jukic	Men's 400m IM	4:17.36	12			did not advance	
David Brandl; Christian Scheruebl; Markus Rogan; Dinko Jukic	Men's 4 × 200 m Freestyle Relay	7:13.34	9			did not advance	

Women

Athlete	Event	Heats		Semifinals		Final	
Athlete	Event	Time	Rank	Time	Rank	Time	Rank
Birgit Koschischek	Women's 100m Freestyle	55.75	29	did not advance			
Birgit Koschischek	Women's 100m Butterfly	59.84	29	did not advance			
Jordis Steinegger	Women's 200m Freestyle	2:01.06	30	did not advance			
Jordis Steinegger	Women's 200m IM	2:17.09	24	did not advance			
Jordis Steinegger	Women's 400m IM	4:41.33	13			did not advance	
Nina Dittrich	Women's 800m Freestyle	8:43.89	21			did not advance	
Nina Dittrich	Women's 1500m Freestyle	16:37.15	21			did not advance	
Fabienne Nadarajah	Women's 50m Backstroke	29.29	28	did not advance			
Fabienne Nadarajah	Women's 50m Butterfly	27.27	25	did not advance			
Joerdis Steingger; Birgit Koschichek; Eva Chavez-Diaz; Nina Dittrich	Women's 4 × 200 m Freestyle Relay	8:06.67	15			did not advance	

== Synchronised swimming ==
Austria has qualified 2 athletes in synchronised swimming.

Women

Athlete	Event	Preliminary		Final	
Athlete	Event	Points	Rank	Points	Rank
Nadine Brandl	Solo Technical Routine	82.500	16	did not advance	
Nadine Brandl	Solo Free Routine	82.520	16	did not advance	
Nadine Brandl; Livia Lang	Duet Technical Routine	82.000	22	did not advance	
Nadine Brandl; Livia Lang	Duet Free Routine	82.680	20	did not advance	
