= Flag of Austria =

Republic of Austria
- Rot-Weiß-Rot ('Red-white-red')
- Use: Civil flag and ensign
- Proportion: 2:3
- Adopted: 1230 (first recorded use); 1 May 1945 (formally adopted); 14 May 2018 (current version)
- Design: A horizontal triband of red (top and bottom) and white.
- Designed by: Leopold V of Austria
- Use: State and war flag, state and naval ensign
- Proportion: 2:3
- Adopted: 28 March 1984; 42 years ago
- Design: A horizontal triband of red (top and bottom) and white defaced with the coat of arms of Austria at its centre.
- Lighter shade variant in use between 2000 and 2018

The national flag of Austria is a triband in the following order: red, white, and red.

The Austrian flag is considered one of the oldest national symbols still in use by a modern country, with its first recorded use in 1230. The Austrian triband originated from the arms of the Babenberg dynasty. As opposed to other flags, such as the black-and-yellow banner of the Habsburgs, the red-white-red flag was from very early on associated, not with a reigning family or monarch, but with the country itself.

In addition to serving as the flag of Austria since 1230, it was adopted as the naval ensigns and state flags of the Kingdom of Lombardy–Venetia, Grand Duchy of Tuscany and Duchy of Modena and Reggio between 18th–19th centuries, as they were ruled by the House of Habsburg or its cadet branches.

The flag of Austria

== History ==
=== Origins ===
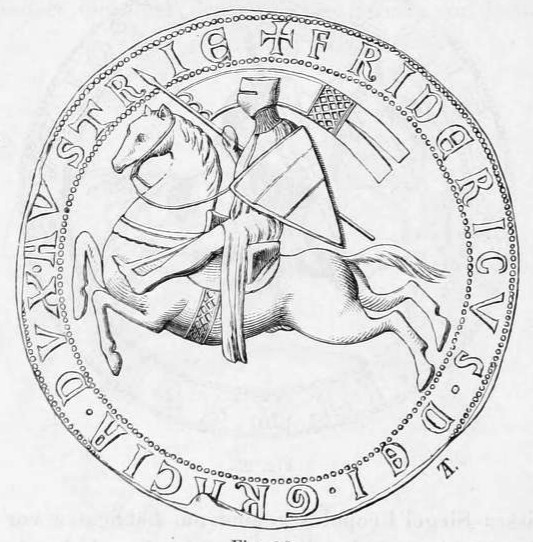
19th century draft of the seal of Duke Frederick II

The flag traces back to the Babenberg dynasty, a silver band on a red field (in heraldry: Gules a fess Argent). The origin of the Bindenschild has not been conclusively established; it possibly derived from the Styrian margraves of the Otakar noble family, who themselves may have adopted the colours from the descendants of the Carinthian duke Adalbero (ruled 1011–1035), a scion of the House of Eppenstein extinct in 1122. However, the Babenberg margrave Leopold III of Austria (1095–1136) had already been depicted with a triband shield in 1105.

When the last Otakar Duke Ottokar IV of Styria died in 1192, the Styrian duchy was inherited by the Babenberg duke Leopold V of Austria according to the 1186 Georgenberg Pact. According to the 18th-century historian Chrysostomus Hanthaler, his grandson Duke Frederick II of Austria (1230–1246), nicknamed the "Quarrelsome" or the "Warlike", the last of the Babenberg dynasty, designed a new coat of arms in red-white-red after his accession—an attempt to prevail against reluctant local nobles and to stress his autonomy towards Emperor Frederick II. The triband is first documented in a seal on a deed issued on 30 November 1230, confirming the privileges of Lilienfeld Abbey. The medieval chronicler Jans der Enikel reports that the duke appeared in a red-white-red ceremonial dress at his 1232 accolade in the Vienna Schottenstift.

The Babenberg family colours developed to the coat of arms of their Austrian possessions. After the dynasty had become extinct with Frederick's death at the 1246 Battle of the Leitha River, they were adopted by his Přemyslid successor King Ottokar II of Bohemia. Upon the 1278 Battle on the Marchfeld the colours were assumed by the victorious House of Habsburg and gradually became the coat of arms of the dynasty's Hereditary Lands within the Habsburg monarchy.

=== Legend ===
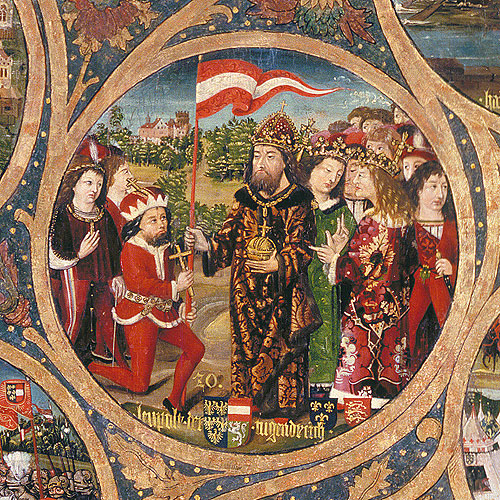
Duke Leopold V (left of centre, kneeling) receiving the red-white-red banner from Emperor Henry VI, from the Babenberger Stammbaum, Klosterneuburg Monastery, c. 1490

According to legend, the flag was invented by Duke Leopold V of Austria as a consequence of his fighting during the Siege of Acre. After a fierce battle, his white surcoat was completely drenched in blood. When he removed his belt, the cloth beneath remained unstained, revealing the combination of red-white-red. So taken was he by this singular sight that he adopted the colours and scheme as his banner. The incident was documented as early as 1260.

In fact, the war flag of the Holy Roman Empire during the Crusades was a silver cross on a red field quite similar to the later Austrian arms. This sign was used by the Austrian capital Vienna from the late 13th century onwards.

=== Habsburg monarchy ===
Flag of the Austrian Empire (used c. 1804–1867)

Since the days of Rudolph of Habsburg and the 1283 Treaty of Rheinfelden, the combination of red-white-red was widely considered to be the Austrian (later also Inner Austrian) colours used by the ruling Habsburg dynasty. However, the black-yellow flag was used as the national flag (in a modern sense) of the Austrian Habsburg monarchy, the later Austrian Empire and the Austrian part of Austria-Hungary, and sometimes even for the entire empire until 1918. These were the family colours of the Imperial House of Habsburg, and were themselves in part derived from the banner of the Holy Roman Empire.

Beginning in the reign of Emperor Joseph II, the Austrian, later Austro-Hungarian Navy used a naval ensign (Marineflagge) based on the red-white-red colours, and augmented with a shield of similar colours. Both of these flags became obsolete with Austria-Hungary's dissolution in 1918, and the newly formed rump state of German Austria adopted the red-white-red triband as its national flag.

== Commemorative coin ==
One example of an Austrian flag coin is the 20 euro postwar period coin, issued by the Republic of Austria on 17 September 2003. The obverse of this coin shows the Austrian coat of arms flanked by the Austrian flag and the European Union flag.

== Design ==
=== Colours ===
The Austrian law does not specify the colour shades of the flag, but on 14 May 2018, the Ministry of Defence issued a regulation specified the red on the flag is Pantone 186 C.

| Scheme | Pantone | RGB (Note: Extrapolated from the given Pantone specifications.) | HEX |
|---|---|---|---|
| Red | 186 C | 200, 16, 46 | #C8102E |

A comparison of the old and new standard of the flag.

Previously, a 31 January 2000 directive specified it was Pantone 032 C.

| Scheme | Pantone | RGB | HEX |
|---|---|---|---|
| Red | 032 C | 237, 41, 57 | #EF3340 |

The red-white-red Austrian flag is almost identical to several other flags found around the world, including the flags of Bouillon and Leuven in Belgium, of Vianden in Luxembourg, of Latvia, the flag of Savona in Italy, the flags of Dordrecht, Gouda, Hoorn and Leiden in the Netherlands, and the flag of Puerto Asís in Colombia. The Austrian flag is said to have inspired the national flag of Lebanon and the Stars and Bars flag used by the Confederate States (and in turn the basis for the flag of the State of Georgia).

=== Construction sheet ===
Flag construction sheet

== See also ==
- List of Austrian flags
- Flags of Austrian states
- Coat of arms of Austria
- Flag of Peru, similar design with vertical stripes
- Flag of Latvia, similar design with carmine colour instead of red and narrower white line
