= Swimming at the 2026 European Aquatics Championships – Men's 100 metre breaststroke =

Men's 100 metre breaststroke at the 2026 European Aquatics Championships
- Venue: Paris Aquatic Centre
- Dates: 10 August (heats and semifinals); 11 August (final)
- Competitors: 71 from 31 nations
- Winning time: 58.58

Medalists
| gold medal | Nicolò Martinenghi | Italy |
| silver medal | Ivan Kozhakin |
| bronze medal | Simone Cerasuolo | Italy |

The Men's 100 metre breaststroke competition of the 2026 European Aquatics Championships was held on 10 and 11 August 2026.

== Records ==
Prior to the competition, the existing world, European and championship records were as follows:

| | Name | Nation | Time | Location | Date |
|---|---|---|---|---|---|
| World record European record | Adam Ramsay-Peaty | Great Britain | 56.88 | Gwangju | 21 July 2019 |
| Championship record | Adam Ramsay-Peaty | Great Britain | 57.10 | Glasgow | 4 August 2018 |

== Results ==
=== Heats ===
The heats begin on 10 August at 10:39.

Qualification Rules: The 16 fastest from the heats qualify to the semi-finals.

| Rank | Heat | Lane | Swimmer | Nation | Time | Notes |
|---|---|---|---|---|---|---|
| 1 | 8 | 3 | Adam Ramsay-Peaty | Great Britain | 59.08 | Q |
| 2 | 7 | 4 | Nicolò Martinenghi | Italy | 59.11 | Q |
| 2 | 8 | 5 | Simone Cerasuolo | Italy | 59.11 | Q |
| 4 | 6 | 2 | Jack Kelly | Ireland | 59.27 | Q, NR |
| 5 | 8 | 6 | Melvin Imoudu | Germany | 59.31 | Q |
| 6 | 8 | 4 | Kirill Prigoda | Neutral Athletes B | 59.38 | Q |
| 7 | 6 | 3 | Filip Nowacki | Great Britain | 59.39 | Q |
| 8 | 7 | 3 | Caspar Corbeau | Netherlands | 59.45 | Q |
| 9 | 6 | 5 | Ivan Kozhakin | Neutral Athletes B | 59.52 | Q |
| 10 | 6 | 4 | Lucas Matzerath | Germany | 59.59 | Q |
| 11 | 7 | 5 | Ludovico Viberti | Italy | 59.75 | |
| 12 | 8 | 7 | Aleksas Savickas | Lithuania | 59.82 | Q |
| 13 | 6 | 6 | Ilya Shymanovich | Neutral Athletes A | 59.86 | Q |
| 14 | 7 | 6 | Carl Aitkaci | France | 59.94 | Q |
| 15 | 7 | 7 | Evangelos Ntoumas | Greece | 1:00.09 | Q |
| 16 | 7 | 8 | Jan Kalusowski | Poland | 1:00.10 | Q |
| 17 | 8 | 2 | Gregory Butler | Great Britain | 1:00.12 | |
| 18 | 4 | 9 | Charlie Egeland | Norway | 1:00.13 | Q |
| 18 | 8 | 9 | Subajr Biltaev | Germany | 1:00.13 | |
| 20 | 7 | 2 | Dawid Wiekiera | Poland | 1:00.23 | |
| 21 | 8 | 1 | Luka Mladenovic | Austria | 1:00.28 | |
| 22 | 8 | 8 | Christian Mantegazza | Italy | 1:00.33 | |
| 23 | 6 | 7 | Aleksandr Zhigalov | Neutral Athletes B | 1:00.36 | |
| 23 | 8 | 0 | Nil Cadevall | Spain | 1:00.36 | |
| 25 | 7 | 1 | Andrius Sidlauskas | Lithuania | 1:00.39 | |
| 26 | 6 | 9 | Darragh Greene | Ireland | 1:00.51 | |
| 27 | 4 | 4 | Matti Mattsson | Finland | 1:00.58 | |
| 28 | 7 | 9 | Daniil Pisetskii | Neutral Athletes B | 1:00.68 | |
| 29 | 5 | 5 | Valentin Bayer | Austria | 1:00.76 | |
| 30 | 6 | 0 | Volodymyr Lisovets | Ukraine | 1:00.77 | |
| 30 | 7 | 0 | Mathis Schonung | Germany | 1:00.77 | |
| 32 | 4 | 6 | Mark Teler | Israel | 1:00.80 | |
| 33 | 4 | 7 | Einar Margeir Ágústsson | Iceland | 1:00.87 | |
| 34 | 6 | 1 | Koen de Groot | Netherlands | 1:00.93 | |
| 35 | 5 | 0 | Christopher Palvadre | Estonia | 1:01.01 | |
| 36 | 5 | 1 | Bernhard Reitshammer | Austria | 1:01.06 | |
| 37 | 5 | 4 | Eoin Corby | Ireland | 1:01.19 | |
| 38 | 5 | 9 | Stepan Babenko | Ukraine | 1:01.26 | |
| 39 | 5 | 8 | Elias Elsgaard | Denmark | 1:01.29 | |
| 40 | 4 | 3 | Oliver Munn | Sweden | 1:01.30 | |
| 41 | 5 | 6 | Darius Coman | Romania | 1:01.36 | |
| 42 | 3 | 1 | Daniel Rumenov Marinov | Norway | 1:01.60 | |
| 43 | 5 | 2 | Doruk Yoğurtcuoğlu | Turkey | 1:01.69 | |
| 44 | 4 | 2 | Filip Mujan | Croatia | 1:01.72 | |
| 45 | 4 | 5 | Gian-Luca Gartmann | Switzerland | 1:01.84 | |
| 46 | 3 | 6 | Finn Kemp | Luxembourg | 1:01.85 | |
| 47 | 3 | 2 | Jami Ihalainen | Finland | 1:01.90 | |
| 48 | 5 | 3 | Adam Bradley | Ireland | 1:01.94 | |
| 49 | 2 | 7 | Shawn Wolf | Denmark | 1:01.99 | |
| 50 | 2 | 6 | Mathias Christensen | Denmark | 1:02.06 | |
| 51 | 6 | 8 | Nusrat Allahverdi | Turkey | 1:02.18 | |
| 52 | 3 | 7 | Ralf Roose | Estonia | 1:02.20 | |
| 52 | 5 | 7 | Snorri Dagur Einarsson | Iceland | 1:02.20 | |
| 54 | 3 | 4 | Laurin Korber-Perner | Austria | 1:02.22 | |
| 55 | 3 | 5 | Uroš Živanović | Serbia | 1:02.26 | |
| 56 | 4 | 0 | Maksym Ovchinnikov | Ukraine | 1:02.36 | |
| 57 | 2 | 3 | Sam Bengtsson Nimander | Sweden | 1:02.58 | |
| 58 | 3 | 9 | João Reisen | Luxembourg | 1:02.60 | |
| 58 | 4 | 1 | Kerem İlyem | Turkey | 1:02.60 | |
| 60 | 3 | 3 | Marios Zafeiropoulos | Greece | 1:02.63 | |
| 61 | 2 | 5 | Davin Lindholm | Finland | 1:02.73 | |
| 62 | 4 | 8 | Jørgen Bråthen | Norway | 1:02.78 | |
| 63 | 2 | 4 | Linus Forsgren | Sweden | 1:02.83 | |
| 64 | 1 | 5 | Julius Nyberg | Finland | 1:03.09 | |
| 65 | 2 | 1 | Denis Svet | Moldova | 1:03.31 | |
| 66 | 2 | 2 | Constantin Malachi | Moldova | 1:03.43 | |
| 67 | 3 | 0 | Daniel Ketrtes | Sweden | 1:03.52 | |
| 68 | 3 | 8 | Patrick Pelegrina | Andorra | 1:03.85 | |
| 69 | 1 | 3 | Ashot Chakhoyan | Armenia | 1:04.11 | |
| 70 | 1 | 4 | Kristaps Čilipāns | Latvia | 1:04.27 | |
| 71 | 2 | 8 | Kristjan Reivart | Estonia | 1:04.54 | |

=== Semifinals ===
The semifinals were started on 10 August at 19:05.

| Rank | Heat | Lane | Swimmer | Nation | Time | Notes |
|---|---|---|---|---|---|---|
| 1 | 1 | 4 | Nicolò Martinenghi | Italy | 58.67 | Q |
| 2 | 1 | 5 | Jack Kelly | Ireland | 58.90 | Q, NR |
| 3 | 2 | 4 | Adam Ramsay-Peaty | Great Britain | 58.94 | Q |
| 4 | 2 | 6 | Filip Nowacki | Great Britain | 59.03 | Q |
| 5 | 2 | 3 | Melvin Imoudu | Germany | 59.13 | Q |
| 6 | 2 | 2 | Ivan Kozhakin | Neutral Athletes B | 59.15 | Q |
| 7 | 1 | 6 | Caspar Corbeau | Netherlands | 59.24 | Q |
| 8 | 2 | 5 | Simone Cerasuolo | Italy | 59.29 | Q |
| 9 | 1 | 3 | Kirill Prigoda | Neutral Athletes B | 59.34 | |
| 10 | 1 | 2 | Lucas Matzerath | Germany | 59.39 | |
| 11 | 2 | 7 | Aleksas Savickas | Lithuania | 59.77 | |
| 12 | 1 | 7 | Ilya Shymanovich | Neutral Athletes A | 59.80 | |
| 13 | 2 | 8 | Jan Kalusowski | Poland | 59.89 | |
| 14 | 2 | 1 | Carl Aitkaci | France | 59.91 | |
| 15 | 1 | 1 | Evangelos Ntoumas | Greece | 59.92 | |
| 16 | 1 | 8 | Charlie Egeland | Norway | 59.94 | |

=== Final ===
The final was held on 11 August at 18:48.

| Rank | Lane | Swimmer | Nation | Time | Notes |
|---|---|---|---|---|---|
| 1st place, gold medalist(s) | 4 | Nicolò Martinenghi | Italy | 58.58 | |
| 2nd place, silver medalist(s) | 7 | Ivan Kozhakin | Neutral Athletes B | 58.68 | |
| 3rd place, bronze medalist(s) | 8 | Simone Cerasuolo | Italy | 58.90 | |
| 4 | 2 | Melvin Imoudu | Germany | 59.05 | |
| 5 | 3 | Adam Ramsay-Peaty | Great Britain | 59.10 | |
| 6 | 6 | Filip Nowacki | Great Britain | 59.11 | |
| 7 | 5 | Jack Kelly | Ireland | 59.36 | |
| 8 | 1 | Caspar Corbeau | Netherlands | 59.48 | |
