= Swimming at the 2026 European Aquatics Championships – Men's 50 metre breaststroke =

Men's 50 metre breaststroke at the 2026 European Aquatics Championships
- Venue: Paris Aquatic Centre
- Dates: 14 August (heats and semifinals); 15 August (final)
- Competitors: 67 from 33 nations
- Winning time: 26.57

Medalists
gold medal	Nicolò Martinenghi	Italy
silver medal	Koen de Groot	Netherlands
silver medal	Simone Cerasuolo	Italy

The Men's 50 metre breaststroke competition of the 2026 European Aquatics Championships was held on 14 and 15 August 2026.

== Records ==
Prior to the competition, the existing world, European and championship records were as follows.

	Name	Nationality	Time	Location	Date
World record	Adam Peaty	Great Britain	25.95	Budapest	25 July 2017
European record	Adam Peaty	Great Britain	25.95	Budapest	25 July 2017
Championship record	Adam Peaty	Great Britain	26.09	Glasgow	8 August 2018

== Results ==
=== Heats ===
The heats were started on 14 August at 09:44.
Qualification Rules: The 16 fastest from the heats qualify to the semifinals.

Rank	Heat	Lane	Swimmer	Country	Time	Notes
1	6	4	Simone Cerasuolo	Italy	26.20	Q, NR
2	5	3	Nicolò Martinenghi	Italy	26.65	Q
3	7	5	Melvin Imoudu	Germany	26.84	Q
4	7	3	Koen de Groot	Netherlands	26.85	Q
5	6	6	Ilya Shymanovich	Neutral Athletes A	26.89	Q
6	7	4	Ludovico Blu Art Viberti	Italy	26.90	
7	5	4	Ivan Kozhakin	Neutral Athletes B	26.96	Q
8	6	5	Kirill Prigoda	Neutral Athletes B	26.99	Q
9	6	7	Valentin Bayer	Austria	27.06	Q
10	5	2	Stepan Babenko	Ukraine	27.08	Q
11	6	2	Nusrat Allahverdi	Turkey	27.12	Q
12	7	2	Jan Malte Grafe	Germany	27.15	Q
13	5	1	Carl Aitkaci	France	27.17	Q
14	6	3	Luka Mladenovic	Austria	27.22	Q
15	7	8	Volodymyr Lisovets	Ukraine	27.23	Q
16	5	7	Andrius Šidlauskas	Lithuania	27.26	Q
17	5	0	Aleksas Savickas	Lithuania	27.29	Q
18	7	7	Filip Nowacki	Great Britain	27.31	R
19	5	8	Jan Kałusowski	Poland	27.32	R
20	5	5	Adam Ramsay-Peaty	Great Britain	27.34	
21	5	6	Caspar Corbeau	Netherlands	27.35	
22	7	6	Jack Kelly	Ireland	27.37	
23	6	0	Uroš Živanović	Serbia	27.38	
24	4	2	Subajr Biltaev	Germany	27.48	
24	6	1	Lucas Matzerath	Germany	27.48	
26	3	7	Shawn Wolf	Denmark	27.58	
27	3	4	Julius Nyberg	Finland	27.62	
28	7	1	Oleg Kostin	Neutral Athletes B	27.66	
29	3	1	Christopher Palvadre	Estonia	27.70	
30	3	0	Einar Margeir Ágústsson	Iceland	27.77	
30	4	4	Bernhard Reitshammer	Austria	27.77	
30	6	9	Darragh Greene	Ireland	27.77	
30	7	0	Nil Cadevall	Spain	27.77	
34	4	3	Aleksandr Zhigalov	Neutral Athletes B	27.78	
35	2	1	Charlie Egeland	Norway	27.79	
35	4	5	Linus Forsgren	Sweden	27.79	
37	6	8	Vojtěch Janeček	Czech Republic	27.84	
38	7	9	Jorgen Scheie Braaten	Norway	27.85	
39	3	6	Mark Teler	Israel	27.90	
39	5	9	Elias Marius Elsgaard	Denmark	27.90	
41	2	2	Kristjan Reivart	Estonia	27.91	
42	4	0	Snorri Dagur Einarsson	Iceland	27.97	
42	4	8	Evangelos Ntoumas	Greece	27.97	
44	3	5	Jami Ihalainen	Finland	28.03	
45	2	6	Ralf Roose	Estonia	28.04	
46	3	2	Oliver Munn	Sweden	28.09	
47	3	3	Davin Lindholm	Finland	28.10	
48	4	7	Adam Bradley	Ireland	28.24	
49	4	1	Daniel Kertes	Sweden	28.25	
50	2	3	Finn Kemp	Luxembourg	28.26	
50	4	6	Dawid Wiekiera	Poland	28.26	
52	4	9	Eoin Corby	Ireland	28.31	
53	2	5	Gian-Luca Gartmann	Switzerland	28.32	
54	1	7	Ashot Chakhoyan	Armenia	28.41	
54	3	8	Maksym Ovchinnikov	Ukraine	28.41	
56	2	4	Jan Niedermayer	Austria	28.44	
57	1	4	Joao Soares Carneiro	Luxembourg	28.48	
58	3	9	Kristaps Čilipāns	Latvia	28.60	
59	1	3	Luka Kmetić	Croatia	28.66	
60	2	7	Constantin Malachi	Moldova	28.79	
61	1	5	Daniel Rumenov Marinov	Norway	28.91	
62	2	8	Patrick Pelegrina	Andorra	28.93	
63	2	9	Marios Zafeiropoulos	Greece	29.32	
64	2	0	Arian Kadić	Bosnia and Herzegovina	29.34	
65	1	8	Vadym Naumenko	Ukraine	29.38	
66	1	2	Heini Mohr Askham	Faroe Islands	31.05	
	1	6	Mathias Christensen	Denmark	Did not start	
	1	1	Emīls Krampe	Latvia	Disqualified	

=== Semifinals ===
The semifinals were started on 14 August at 18:59.
Qualification Rules: The first 2 competitors of each semifinal and the remaining fastest (up to a total of 8 qualified competitors) from the semifinals advance to the final.

Rank	Heat	Lane	Name	Nationality	Time	Notes
1	2	4	Simone Cerasuolo	Italy	26.23	Q
2	1	4	Nicolò Martinenghi	Italy	26.62	Q
3	1	5	Koen de Groot	Netherlands	26.71	Q
4	2	3	Ilya Shymanovich	Neutral Athletes A	26.77	Q
5	1	1	Volodymyr Lisovets	Ukraine	26.84	Q
6	1	3	Ivan Kozhakin	Neutral Athletes B	26.85	Q
7	2	2	Stepan Babenko	Ukraine	26.91	Q
8	2	5	Melvin Imoudu	Germany	26.93	Q
9	2	6	Kirill Prigoda	Neutral Athletes B	27.01	
10	2	7	Jan Malte Grafe	Germany	27.07	
11	1	2	Nusrat Allahverdi	Turkey	27.09	
11	1	8	Aleksas Savickas	Lithuania	27.09	NR
13	2	8	Andrius Šidlauskas	Lithuania	27.11	
14	1	6	Valentin Bayer	Austria	27.19	
15	1	7	Carl Aitkaci	France	27.27	
16	2	1	Luka Mladenovic	Austria	27.37	

=== Final ===
The final was held on 15 August at 18:42.

Rank	Lane	Name	Nationality	Time	Notes
1st place, gold medalist(s)	5	Nicolò Martinenghi	Italy	26.57	
2nd place, silver medalist(s)	3	Koen de Groot	Netherlands	26.62	NR
2nd place, silver medalist(s)	4	Simone Cerasuolo	Italy	26.62	
4	1	Stepan Babenko	Ukraine	26.72	
5	2	Volodymyr Lisovets	Ukraine	26.78	
6	8	Melvin Imoudu	Germany	26.87	
7	6	Ilya Shymanovich	Neutral Athletes A	26.93	
8	7	Ivan Kozhakin	Neutral Athletes B	27.01	
