= 2024 World Aquatics Swimming Championships (25 m) – Men's 50 metre breaststroke =

Swimming competition

Men's 50 metre breaststroke at the 2024 World Aquatics Swimming Championships (25 m)
- Venue: Duna Arena
- Location: Budapest, Hungary
- Dates: 14 December (heats and semifinals); 15 December (final)
- Competitors: 74 from 66 nations
- Winning time: 25.42

Medalists
| gold medal | Qin Haiyang | China |
| silver medal | Emre Sakçı | Turkey |
| silver medal | Kirill Prigoda |

The Men's 50 metre breaststroke competition of the 2024 World Aquatics Swimming Championships (25 m) was held on 14 and 15 December 2024.

== Records ==
Prior to the competition, the existing world and championship records were as follows:

| World record | Emre Sakçı (TUR) | 24.95 | Gaziantep, Turkey | 27 December 2021 |
| Competition record | Nic Fink (USA) | 25.38 | Melbourne, Australia | 18 December 2022 |

== Background ==
World record holder Emre Sakçı was entered in the event, but China's Qin Haiyang had won the event at all three stops of the 2024 World Cup. Qin’s fastest swim came in Shanghai, where he set a new Asian record of 25.38. He followed with a 25.76 in Incheon and a 25.47 in Singapore. Ilya Shymanovich, competing as a Neutral Athlete, recorded his season best of 25.51 at the Shanghai World Cup stop, which was his fastest swim in the event since 2021. Simone Cerasuolo of Italy, the 2022 bronze medalist, had also been under 26 seconds, having swum 25.79 earlier in the season. Kirill Prigoda, competing as a neutral athlete, entered with a 25.65 season best and a lifetime best of 25.49. Ludovico Viberti of Italy had also swam under 26 seconds with a 25.88 in October. Other swimmers included Japan's Taku Taniguchi (26.02), the Netherlands' Caspar Corbeau (26.15), Australia's Joshua Yong (26.34), Germany's Lucas Matzerath and Melvin Imoudu (both 26.50), and Michael Andrew of the USA, who entered with a season best of 26.22 and a lifetime best of 25.81.

SwimSwam predicted Haiyang would win, Cerasuolo would come second, and Shymanovich would come third.

== Results ==
=== Heats ===
The heats were started on 14 December at 10:56.

| Rank | Heat | Lane | Name | Nationality | Time | Notes |
|---|---|---|---|---|---|---|
| 1 | 8 | 4 | Qin Haiyang | China | 25.51 | Q |
| 2 | 8 | 5 | Simone Cerasuolo | Italy | 25.67 | Q |
| 3 | 6 | 4 | Kirill Prigoda | Neutral Athletes B | 25.76 | Q |
| 4 | 5 | 6 | Michael Houlie | South Africa | 25.77 | Q |
| 5 | 7 | 5 | Emre Sakçı | Turkey | 25.82 | Q |
| 6 | 7 | 4 | Ilya Shymanovich | Neutral Athletes A | 25.87 | Q |
| 7 | 6 | 5 | Ludovico Viberti | Italy | 25.97 | Q |
| 7 | 6 | 6 | Koen de Groot | Netherlands | 25.97 | Q |
| 9 | 7 | 0 | Melvin Imoudu | Germany | 25.98 | Q |
| 10 | 7 | 2 | Chris Smith | South Africa | 26.02 | Q |
| 10 | 8 | 3 | Taku Taniguchi | Japan | 26.02 | Q |
| 12 | 8 | 6 | Caspar Corbeau | Netherlands | 26.07 | Q |
| 13 | 4 | 6 | Ronan Wantenaar | Namibia | 26.15 | Q, NR |
| 14 | 6 | 8 | Daniel Kertes | Sweden | 26.20 | Q |
| 15 | 7 | 6 | Michael Andrew | United States | 26.23 | Q |
| 16 | 6 | 7 | Caio Pumputis | Brazil | 26.25 | Q |
| 17 | 6 | 3 | Oleg Kostin | Neutral Athletes B | 26.28 | R |
| 18 | 5 | 5 | Denis Petrashov | Kyrgyzstan | 26.29 | R |
| 19 | 3 | 7 | Finlay Knox | Canada | 26.30 | NR |
| 20 | 6 | 2 | Bernhard Reitshammer | Austria | 26.34 | |
| 20 | 7 | 8 | Heiko Gigler | Austria | 26.34 | |
| 22 | 6 | 9 | Mikel Schreuders | Aruba | 26.36 | NR |
| 23 | 7 | 3 | Choi Dong-yeol | South Korea | 26.38 | |
| 23 | 8 | 8 | Carles Coll | Spain | 26.38 | |
| 25 | 8 | 0 | Volodymyr Lisovets | Ukraine | 26.39 | |
| 26 | 5 | 0 | Jørgen Scheie Bråthen | Norway | 26.45 | |
| 27 | 8 | 1 | Andrius Sidlauskas | Lithuania | 26.50 | |
| 28 | 8 | 2 | Archie Goodburn | Great Britain | 26.51 | |
| 29 | 5 | 3 | Jan Kałusowski | Poland | 26.65 | |
| 30 | 7 | 7 | Nicholas Lia | Norway | 26.67 | |
| 31 | 6 | 1 | Berkay Ömer Öğretir | Turkey | 26.72 | |
| 32 | 5 | 4 | Kristian Pitshugin | Israel | 26.73 | |
| 33 | 8 | 9 | Lucas Matzerath | Germany | 26.78 | |
| 34 | 3 | 2 | Samy Boutouil | Morocco | 26.81 | NR |
| 35 | 4 | 2 | Arsen Kozhakhmetov | Kazakhstan | 26.90 | |
| 36 | 4 | 7 | Juan García | Colombia | 26.91 | |
| 36 | 6 | 0 | Peter Stevens | Slovenia | 26.91 | |
| 38 | 7 | 1 | Davin Elias Lindholm | Finland | 26.98 | |
| 39 | 7 | 9 | Snorri Dagur Einarsson | Iceland | 27.07 | |
| 40 | 5 | 7 | Chao Man Hou | Macau | 27.18 | |
| 41 | 5 | 1 | Arkadios Aspougalis | Greece | 27.21 | |
| 42 | 4 | 3 | Panayiotis Panaretos | Cyprus | 27.27 | NR |
| 43 | 4 | 4 | Ralf Roose | Estonia | 27.29 | |
| 44 | 3 | 3 | Josué Domínguez | Dominican Republic | 27.39 | |
| 45 | 3 | 5 | Wu Chun-feng | Chinese Taipei | 27.44 | |
| 45 | 5 | 9 | Eoin Corby | Ireland | 27.44 | |
| 47 | 4 | 1 | Maksim Manolov | Bulgaria | 27.46 | |
| 48 | 4 | 0 | Louis Droupy | Switzerland | 27.52 | |
| 48 | 4 | 9 | Adrian Robinson | Botswana | 27.52 | NR |
| 50 | 3 | 6 | Patrick Pelegrina | Andorra | 27.56 | |
| 51 | 4 | 5 | Adam Mak | Hong Kong | 27.63 | |
| 52 | 5 | 8 | Olivér Gál | Hungary | 27.71 | |
| 53 | 3 | 0 | Joao Carneiro | Luxembourg | 27.77 | |
| 53 | 5 | 2 | Constantin Malachi | Moldova | 27.77 | |
| 55 | 3 | 4 | Ádám Halás | Slovakia | 27.81 | |
| 56 | 3 | 9 | Zach Moyo | Zambia | 28.02 | NR |
| 57 | 2 | 6 | Haniel Kudwoli | Kenya | 28.27 | |
| 58 | 1 | 1 | Orhan Dine Moreira | Benin | 28.56 | NR |
| 59 | 2 | 5 | Luis Sebastian Weekes | Barbados | 28.57 | |
| 60 | 1 | 2 | Mohamed Abujiba | Palestine | 28.76 | NR |
| 61 | 2 | 7 | Raúl Antadillas | Panama | 28.80 | |
| 62 | 3 | 8 | Abobakr Abass | Sudan | 29.06 | |
| 63 | 2 | 2 | Thomas Chen | Papua New Guinea | 29.14 | NR |
| 64 | 2 | 4 | Ganzorigtyn Sugar | Mongolia | 29.58 | |
| 65 | 1 | 6 | Kim Won-ju | North Korea | 29.98 | |
| 66 | 1 | 3 | Anas Ganedi | Libya | 30.09 | NR |
| 67 | 2 | 1 | Nathan Fletcher | Grenada | 30.65 | |
| 68 | 2 | 0 | Isihaka Isihaka | Rwanda | 31.38 | |
| 69 | 2 | 8 | Fode Amara Camara | Guinea | 31.42 | |
| 70 | 1 | 5 | Ailton Lima | Cape Verde | 33.36 | |
| 70 | 2 | 9 | Yves Munyu Kupiata | Democratic Republic of the Congo | 33.36 | |
| 72 | 1 | 4 | Alemekezeke Chinyamu | Malawi | 34.46 | |
| | 2 | 3 | Selim Nazarov | Turkmenistan | Disqualified | |
| | 3 | 1 | Ashot Chakhoyan | Armenia | Disqualified | |
| | 1 | 7 | Danilson Ie | Guinea-Bissau | Did not start | |
| | 4 | 8 | Jaouad Syoud | Algeria | Did not start | |
| | 8 | 7 | Joshua Yong | Australia | Did not start | |

=== Semifinals ===
The semifinals were started on 14 December at 17:57.

| Rank | Heat | Lane | Name | Nationality | Time | Notes |
|---|---|---|---|---|---|---|
| 1 | 2 | 5 | Kirill Prigoda | Neutral Athletes B | 25.48 | Q, NR |
| 2 | 2 | 4 | Qin Haiyang | China | 25.60 | Q |
| 3 | 1 | 2 | Chris Smith | South Africa | 25.66 | Q, WJ |
| 4 | 1 | 3 | Ilya Shymanovich | Neutral Athletes A | 25.67 | Q |
| 4 | 2 | 3 | Emre Sakçı | Turkey | 25.67 | Q |
| 6 | 1 | 5 | Michael Houlie | South Africa | 25.69 | Q |
| 7 | 2 | 6 | Ludovico Viberti | Italy | 25.80 | Q |
| 8 | 1 | 4 | Simone Cerasuolo | Italy | 25.81 | Q |
| 9 | 1 | 6 | Koen de Groot | Netherlands | 25.86 | R |
| 10 | 2 | 2 | Melvin Imoudu | Germany | 25.96 | R |
| 10 | 2 | 7 | Taku Taniguchi | Japan | 25.96 | R |
| 12 | 1 | 1 | Daniel Kertes | Sweden | 26.17 | =NR |
| 13 | 2 | 8 | Michael Andrew | United States | 26.24 | |
| 14 | 1 | 7 | Caspar Corbeau | Netherlands | 26.31 | |
| 15 | 1 | 8 | Caio Pumputis | Brazil | 26.37 | |
| | 2 | 1 | Ronan Wantenaar | Namibia | Disqualified | |

=== Final ===
The final was held on 15 December at 17:55.

| Rank | Lane | Name | Nationality | Time | Notes |
|---|---|---|---|---|---|
| 1st place, gold medalist(s) | 5 | Qin Haiyang | China | 25.42 | |
| 2nd place, silver medalist(s) | 2 | Emre Sakçı | Turkey | 25.56 | |
| 2nd place, silver medalist(s) | 4 | Kirill Prigoda | Neutral Athletes B | 25.56 | |
| 4 | 8 | Simone Cerasuolo | Italy | 25.62 | |
| 5 | 6 | Ilya Shymanovich | Neutral Athletes A | 25.64 | |
| 6 | 1 | Ludovico Viberti | Italy | 25.71 | |
| 7 | 7 | Michael Houlie | South Africa | 25.73 | |
| 8 | 3 | Chris Smith | South Africa | 25.77 | |
