= 2022 FINA World Swimming Championships (25 m) – Men's 50 metre breaststroke =

Swimming competition

Men's 50 metre breaststroke at the 2022 FINA World Swimming Championships (25 m)
- Venue: Melbourne Sports and Aquatic Centre
- Location: Melbourne, Australia
- Dates: 17 December (heats and semifinals); 18 December (final)
- Competitors: 61 from 56 nations
- Winning time: 25.38 CR

Medalists
gold medal	Nic Fink	United States
silver medal	Nicolò Martinenghi	Italy
bronze medal	Simone Cerasuolo	Italy

The Men's 50 metre breaststroke competition of the 2022 FINA World Swimming Championships (25 m) was held on 17 and 18 December 2022.

== Records ==
Prior to the competition, the existing world and championship records were as follows.

World record	Emre Sakçı (TUR)	24.95	Gaziantep, Turkey	27 December 2021
Competition record	Cameron van der Burgh (RSA)	25.41	Hangzhou, China	16 December 2018

The following new records were set during this competition:

Date	Event	Name	Nationality	Time	Record
18 December	Final	Nic Fink	United States	25.38	CR

== Results ==
=== Heats ===
The heats were started on 17 December at 12:51.

Rank	Heat	Lane	Name	Nationality	Time	Notes
1	9	4	Nicolò Martinenghi	Italy	25.71	Q
2	8	1	Adam Peaty	Great Britain	26.01	Q
3	7	6	Yan Zibei	China	26.06	Q
4	7	4	Nic Fink	United States	26.07	Q
5	7	3	Qin Haiyang	China	26.13	Q
6	7	5	Yuya Hinomoto	Japan	26.15	Q
7	9	5	Simone Cerasuolo	Italy	26.16	Q
8	7	2	Michael Andrew	United States	26.17	Q
9	8	4	Emre Sakçı	Turkey	26.26	Q
10	9	3	Peter John Stevens	Slovenia	26.31	Q
11	7	7	Grayson Bell	Australia	26.37	Q
11	9	8	Carl Aitkaci	France	26.37	Q
13	8	2	Sam Williamson	Australia	26.42	Q
14	8	8	Chao Man Hou	Macau	26.46	Q, NR
15	5	7	Mikel Schreuders	Aruba	26.47	Q, NR
16	8	6	Masaki Niiyama	Japan	26.51	QSO
16	9	7	Olli Kokko	Finland	26.51	QSO
18	8	3	Bernhard Reitshammer	Austria	26.64	
19	4	7	Wu Chun-feng	Chinese Taipei	26.67	NR
19	9	1	Lucas Matzerath	Germany	26.67	
21	7	8	Denis Petrashov	Kyrgyzstan	26.71	NR
22	9	2	Andrius Šidlauskas	Lithuania	26.80	
23	9	6	Caspar Corbeau	Netherlands	26.83	
24	7	1	Renato Prono	Paraguay	26.92	
25	6	7	Josh Gilbert	New Zealand	26.95	
26	5	5	Volodymyr Lisovets	Ukraine	27.04	
27	8	7	Christoffer Haarsaker	Norway	27.05	
28	4	6	Maximillian Ang	Singapore	27.09	NR
29	5	4	Ádám Halás	Slovakia	27.12	
30	6	2	Jadon Wuilliez	Netherlands Antilles	27.16	
30	6	6	Matěj Zábojník	Czech Republic	27.16	
32	6	5	Josué Domínguez	Dominican Republic	27.18	
33	6	8	James Dergousoff	Canada	27.19	
34	6	4	Youssef El-Kamash	Egypt	27.28	
35	4	4	Ronan Wantenaar	Namibia	27.45	NR
36	5	2	Constantin Malachi	Moldova	27.63	
37	4	1	Rashed Al-Tarmoom	Kuwait	27.66	NR
38	5	8	Simon Haddon	South Africa	27.67	
39	5	3	Julio Horrego	Honduras	27.71	
40	4	2	Adriel Sanes	United States Virgin Islands	27.76	
41	4	3	Adrian Robinson	Botswana	27.79	NR
41	4	5	Martin Melconian	Uruguay	27.79	
43	5	6	Ng Yan Kin	Hong Kong	27.92	
44	3	4	Alexandre Grand'Pierre	Haiti	27.99	NR
45	3	6	Tasi Limtiaco	Federated States of Micronesia	28.26	
46	4	8	Abobakr Abass	Sudan	28.44	NR
47	3	5	Jonathan Raharvel	Madagascar	28.55	
48	1	5	Sébastien Kouma	Mali	28.73	
49	3	1	Epeli Rabua	Fiji	28.84	
50	3	7	Jesús Cabrera	Bolivia	29.25	
51	1	4	Myagmaryn Delgerkhüü	Mongolia	29.85	
52	2	4	Omar Al-Hammadi	United Arab Emirates	29.96	
53	3	8	Hilal Hilal	Tanzania	30.23	
54	2	3	Bikash Kumal	Nepal	31.11	
55	2	6	Nathaniel Noka	Papua New Guinea	31.62	
56	2	7	Cameron Jele	Eswatini	34.95	
	2	5	Marc Dansou	Benin	Disqualified	
	3	2	Muhammad Isa Ahmad	Brunei	Disqualified	
	5	1	Tonislav Sabev	Bulgaria	Disqualified	
	6	1	Jorge Murillo	Colombia	Disqualified	
	8	5	João Gomes Júnior	Brazil	Disqualified	
	1	3	Yann Douma	Republic of the Congo	Did not start	
	2	2	Sheku Kamara	Sierra Leone	Did not start	
	3	3	Matthew Lawrence	Mozambique	Did not start	
	6	3	Anton McKee	Iceland	Did not start	

==== Swim-off ====
The swim-off was held on 17 December at 13:33.

Rank	Lane	Name	Nationality	Time	Notes
1	5	Olli Kokko	Finland	26.24	Q, NR
2	4	Masaki Niiyama	Japan	26.50	

=== Semifinals ===
The semifinals were started on 17 December at 21:17.

Rank	Heat	Lane	Name	Nationality	Time	Notes
1	2	4	Nicolò Martinenghi	Italy	25.60	Q
2	1	5	Nic Fink	United States	25.64	Q
3	2	6	Simone Cerasuolo	Italy	25.66	Q
4	2	5	Yan Zibei	China	25.80	Q, AS
5	1	6	Michael Andrew	United States	25.81	Q
5	2	3	Qin Haiyang	China	25.81	Q
7	1	4	Adam Peaty	Great Britain	25.85	Q
8	2	2	Emre Sakçı	Turkey	26.04	Q
9	1	3	Yuya Hinomoto	Japan	26.13	
10	2	7	Grayson Bell	Australia	26.24	=OC
11	1	8	Olli Kokko	Finland	26.25	
11	2	1	Sam Williamson	Australia	26.25	
13	1	2	Peter John Stevens	Slovenia	26.33	
14	1	7	Carl Aitkaci	France	26.41	
15	2	8	Mikel Schreuders	Aruba	26.66	
16	1	1	Chao Man Hou	Macau	26.77	

=== Final ===
The final was held on 18 December at 20:01.

Rank	Lane	Name	Nationality	Time	Notes
1st place, gold medalist(s)	5	Nic Fink	United States	25.38	CR, AM
2nd place, silver medalist(s)	4	Nicolò Martinenghi	Italy	25.42	
3rd place, bronze medalist(s)	3	Simone Cerasuolo	Italy	25.68	
4	7	Qin Haiyang	China	25.82	
5	2	Michael Andrew	United States	25.92	
6	1	Adam Peaty	Great Britain	25.99	
7	6	Yan Zibei	China	26.06	
8	8	Emre Sakçı	Turkey	26.09	
