= List of Italian records in swimming =

The Italian records in swimming are the fastest times ever swum by a swimmer representing Italy in competition. These records are ratified by the Italian Swimming Federation (FIN, Federazione Italiana Nuoto).

Records marked with a hash (#) are currently awaiting ratification by FIN or have been obtained since the last version of the official lists.

All records were achieved in finals unless otherwise specified.

== Long course (50 m) ==
=== Men ===
Event	Time		Name	Club	Date	Meet	Location	Ref
50 m freestyle	21.37	sf	Andrea Vergani	Italy	8 August 2018	European Championships	Glasgow, Great Britain	
100 m freestyle	47.45		Alessandro Miressi	Italy	19 May 2021	European Championships	Budapest, Hungary	
200 m freestyle	1:44.72	r	Carlos D'Ambrosio	Italy	10 August 2026	European Championships	Paris, France	
400 m freestyle	3:43.23		Gabriele Detti	Italy	21 July 2019	World Championships	Gwangju, South Korea	
800 m freestyle	7:39.27		Gregorio Paltrinieri	Italy	24 July 2019	World Championships	Gwangju, South Korea	
1500 m freestyle	14:32.80		Gregorio Paltrinieri	Italy	25 June 2022	World Championships	Budapest, Hungary	
50 m backstroke	24.38		Michele Lamberti	Fiamme Gialle	14 April 2026	Italian Championships	Riccione, Italy	
100 m backstroke	51.60	WR	Thomas Ceccon	Italy	20 June 2022	World Championships	Budapest, Hungary	
200 m backstroke	1:53.96		Thomas Ceccon	Italy	12 August 2026	European Championships	Paris, France	
50 m breaststroke	26.20	h	Simone Cerasuolo	Italy	13 August 2026	European Championships	Paris, France	
100 m breaststroke	58.26	=	Nicolò Martinenghi	Italy	19 June 2022	World Championships	Budapest, Hungary	
100 m breaststroke	58.26	=	Nicolò Martinenghi	Italy	12 August 2022	European Championships	Rome, Italy	
200 m breaststroke	2:08.50	sf	Loris Facci	Italy	30 July 2009	World Championships	Rome, Italy	
50m butterfly	22.67		Thomas Ceccon	Italy	28 July 2025	World Championships	Singapore, Singapore	
100m butterfly	50.42	sf	Thomas Ceccon	Italy	1 August 2025	World Championships	Singapore, Singapore	
200m butterfly	1:54.23		Alberto Razzetti	Italy	15 August 2026	European Championships	Paris, France	
200m individual medley	1:56.21		Alberto Razzetti	Fiamme Gialle	28 November 2023	Italian Championships	Riccione, Italy	
400m individual medley	4:09.29		Alberto Razzetti	Fiamme Gialle	30 November 2023	Italian Championships	Riccione, Italy	
4×100m freestyle relay	3:09.58		Carlos D'Ambrosio (47.78); Thomas Ceccon (47.10); Lorenzo Zazzeri (47.36); Manuel Frigo (47.34)	Italy	27 July 2025	World Championships	Singapore, Singapore	
4×200m freestyle relay	7:02.01		Filippo Megli (1:45.86); Gabriele Detti (1:45.30); Stefano Ballo (1:45.27); Stefano Di Cola (1:45.58)	Italy	26 July 2019	World Championships	Gwangju, South Korea	
4×100m medley relay	3:27.51		Thomas Ceccon (51.93); Nicolò Martinenghi (57.47); Federico Burdisso (50.63); Alessandro Miressi (47.48)	Italy	25 June 2022	World Championships	Budapest, Hungary	

Legend: # – Record awaiting ratification by Italian Swimming Federation; WR – World record; ER – European record; e – equalled existing record;
Records not set in finals: h – heat; sf – semifinal; r – relay 1st leg; rh – relay heat 1st leg; b – B final; † – en route to final mark; so – swim-off; tt – time trial

=== Women ===
Event	Time		Name	Club	Date	Meet	Location	Ref
50m freestyle	23.99		Sara Curtis	Italy	15 August 2026	European Championships	Paris, France	
100m freestyle	52.69		Sara Curtis	Italy	27 June 2026	Sette Colli Trophy	Rome, Italy	
200m freestyle	1:52.98	ER	Federica Pellegrini	Italy	29 July 2009	World Championships	Rome, Italy	
400m freestyle	3:59.15	ER	Federica Pellegrini	Italy	26 July 2009	World Championships	Rome, Italy	
800m freestyle	8:12.81	ER	Simona Quadarella	Italy	2 August 2025	World Championships	Singapore, Singapore	
1500m freestyle	15:31.79	ER	Simona Quadarella	Italy	29 July 2025	World Championships	Singapore, Singapore	
50m backstroke	26.56	WR	Sara Curtis	Italy	13 August 2026	European Championships	Paris, France	
100m backstroke	58.43	r	Sara Curtis	Italy	16 August 2026	European Championships	Paris, France	
200m backstroke	2:05.56		Margherita Panziera	GS Fiamme Oro	31 March 2021	Italian Championships	Riccione, Italy	
50m breaststroke	29.30	sf	Benedetta Pilato	Italy	22 May 2021	European Championships	Budapest, Hungary	
100m breaststroke	1:05.44		Benedetta Pilato	Italy	21 June 2024	Sette Colli Trophy	Rome, Italy	
200m breaststroke	2:22.28		Lisa Angiolini	Centro Sp.vo Carabinieri	15 April 2026	Italian Championships	Riccione, Italy	
50m butterfly	25.49	h	Silvia Di Pietro	Italy	1 August 2025	World Championships	Singapore, Singapore	
100m butterfly	57.04	sf	Elena Di Liddo	Italy	21 July 2019	World Championships	Gwangju, South Korea	
200m butterfly	2:06.50		Caterina Giacchetti	Circolo Canottieri Aniene	26 May 2009	Italian Championships	Pescara, Italy	
200m individual medley	2:09.30		Sara Franceschi	Fiamme Gialle	25 June 2023	Sette Colli Trophy	Rome, Italy	
400m individual medley	4:34.34		Alessia Filippi	Italy	10 August 2008	Olympic Games	Beijing, China	
4×100m freestyle relay	3:33.19		Emma Menicucci (53.85); Sara Curtis (52.29); Chiara Tarantino (53.68); Alessandra Mao (53.37)	Italy	12 August 2026	European Championships	Paris, France	
4×200m freestyle relay	7:46.57		Renata Spagnolo (1:58.79); Alessia Filippi (1:56.97); Alice Carpanese (1:57.36); Federica Pellegrini (1:53.45)	Italy	30 July 2009	World Championships	Rome, Italy	
4×100m medley relay	3:53.60		Sara Curtis (58.43); Benedetta Pilato (1:04.53); Anita Gastaldi (57.07); Emma Menicucci (53.57)	Italy	16 August 2026	European Championships	Paris, France	

Legend: # – Record awaiting ratification by Italian Swimming Federation; WR – World record; ER – European record; e – equalled existing record;
Records not set in finals: h – heat; sf – semifinal; r – relay 1st leg; rh – relay heat 1st leg; b – B final; † – en route to final mark; so – swim-off; tt – time trial

=== Mixed relay ===
Event	Time	Name	Club	Date	Meet	Location	Ref
4×100m freestyle relay	3:20.80	Carlos D'Ambrosio (47.86); Thomas Ceccon (47.56); Sara Curtis (51.79); Emma Menicucci (53.59)	Italy	14 August 2026	European Championships	Paris, France	
4×200m freestyle relay	7:29.35	Stefano Ballo (1:46.96); Stefano Di Cola (1:46.16); Federica Pellegrini (1:55.66); Margherita Panziera (2:00.57)	Italy	18 May 2021	European Championships	Budapest, Hungary	
4×100m medley relay	3:39.28	Thomas Ceccon (52.23); Nicolò Martinenghi (57.73); Elena Di Liddo (56.62); Federica Pellegrini (52.70)	Italy	31 July 2021	Olympic Games	Tokyo, Japan	

Legend: # – Record awaiting ratification by Italian Swimming Federation; WR – World record; ER – European record; e – equalled existing record;
Records not set in finals: h – heat; so – swim-off

== Short course (25 m) ==
=== Men ===
Event	Time		Name	Club	Date	Meet	Location	Ref
50m freestyle	20.69		Marco Orsi	Italy	5 December 2014	World Championships	Doha, Qatar	
100m freestyle	45.51		Alessandro Miressi	Italy	10 December 2023	European Championships	Otopeni, Romania	
200m freestyle	1:40.69		Carlos D'Ambrosio	Fiamme Gialle	30 March 2026	Italian Youth Championships	Riccione, Italy	
400m freestyle	3:36.63		Gabriele Detti	In Sport Rane Rosse	7 April 2019	Coppa Caduti di Brema	Riccione, Italy	
800m freestyle	7:27.94		Gregorio Paltrinieri	Italy	7 November 2021	European Championships	Kazan, Russia	
1500m freestyle	14:08.06		Gregorio Paltrinieri	Italy	4 December 2015	European Championships	Netanya, Israel	
50m backstroke	22.62	r	Michele Lamberti	Italy	3 November 2021	European Championships	Kazan, Russia	
100m backstroke	49.04		Lorenzo Mora	Italy	14 December 2022	World Championships	Melbourne, Australia	
200m backstroke	1:47.49		Thomas Ceccon	Italy	23 October 2025	World Cup	Toronto, Canada	
50m breaststroke	25.37	sf	Nicolò Martinenghi	Italy	6 November 2021	European Championships	Kazan, Russia	
100m breaststroke	55.63		Nicolò Martinenghi	Italy	4 November 2021	European Championships	Kazan, Russia	
200m breaststroke	2:03.80		Edoardo Giorgetti	Italy	18 December 2009	Duel in the Pool	Manchester, Great Britain	
50m butterfly	22.01		Michele Busa	Italy	11 December 2024	World Championships	Budapest, Hungary	
100m butterfly	48.64		Matteo Rivolta	Aqua Centurions	27 November 2021	International Swimming League	Eindhoven, Netherlands	
200m butterfly	1:48.64	ER	Alberto Razzetti	Italy	12 December 2024	World Championships	Budapest, Hungary	
100m individual medley	50.95		Marco Orsi	Italy	7 November 2021	European Championships	Kazan, Russia	
200m individual medley	1:50.88		Alberto Razzetti	Italy	10 December 2024	World Championships	Budapest, Hungary	
400m individual medley	3:57.01		Alberto Razzetti	Italy	10 December 2023	European Championships	Otopeni, Romania	
4×50m freestyle relay	1:22.90	=	Santo Condorelli (21.27); Andrea Vergani (20.44); Alessandro Miressi (20.57); Lorenzo Zazzeri (20.62)	Italy	14 December 2018	World Championships	Hangzhou, China	
4×50m freestyle relay	1:22.90	=	Leonardo Deplano (20.88); Lorenzo Zazzeri (20.56); Giovanni Guatti (20.67); Thomas Ceccon (20.79)	Italy	2 December 2025	European Championships	Lublin, Poland	
4×100m freestyle relay	3:02.75	ER	Alessandro Miressi (46.15); Paolo Conte Bonin (45.93); Leonardo Deplano (45.54); Thomas Ceccon (45.13)	Italy	13 December 2022	World Championships	Melbourne, Australia	
4×200m freestyle relay	6:47.51		Filippo Megli (1:42.26); Manuel Frigo (1:42.15); Carlos D'Ambrosio (1:41.48); Alberto Razzetti (1:41.62)	Italy	13 December 2024	World Championships	Budapest, Hungary	
4×50m medley relay	1:29.72	WR	Lorenzo Mora (22.65); Nicolò Martinenghi (24.95); Matteo Rivolta (21.60); Leonardo Deplano (20.52)	Italy	17 December 2022	World Championships	Melbourne, Australia	
4×100m medley relay	3:19.06		Lorenzo Mora (49.48); Nicolò Martinenghi (55.52); Matteo Rivolta (48.50); Alessandro Miressi (45.56)	Italy	18 December 2022	World Championships	Melbourne, Australia	

Legend: # – Record awaiting ratification by Italian Swimming Federation; WR – World record; ER – European record; e – equalled existing record;
Records not set in finals: h – heat; sf – semifinal; r – relay 1st leg; rh – relay heat 1st leg; b – B final; † – en route to final mark; so – swim-off; tt – time trial

=== Women ===
Event	Time		Name	Club	Date	Meet	Location	Ref
50 m freestyle	23.39	r	Silvia Di Pietro	Italy	2 December 2025	European Championships	Lublin, Poland	
100 m freestyle	51.26		Sara Curtis	Italy	6 December 2025	European Championships	Lublin, Poland	
200 m freestyle	1:51.17		Federica Pellegrini	Italy	13 December 2009	European Championships	Istanbul, Turkey	
400 m freestyle	3:56.70		Simona Quadarella	Italy	2 December 2025	European Championships	Lublin, Poland	
800 m freestyle	8:03.00		Simona Quadarella	Italy	5 December 2025	European Championships	Lublin, Poland	
1500 m freestyle	15:29.74	=	Simona Quadarella	Circolo Canottieri Aniene	5 March 2021	Regional Meet	Rome, Italy	
1500 m freestyle	15:29.74	=	Simona Quadarella	Circolo Canottieri Aniene	24 April 2021	Regional Championships	Pietralata, Italy	
50 m backstroke	25.49		Sara Curtis	Italy	7 December 2025	European Championships	Lublin, Poland	
100 m backstroke	56.57	sf	Margherita Panziera	Italy	4 December 2019	European Championships	Glasgow, United Kingdom	
200 m backstroke	2:01.45		Margherita Panziera	Italy	6 December 2019	European Championships	Glasgow, United Kingdom	
50m breaststroke	28.81		Benedetta Pilato	Energy Standard	21 November 2020	International Swimming League	Budapest, Hungary	
100m breaststroke	1:03.55		Benedetta Pilato	Energy Standard	15 November 2020	International Swimming League	Budapest, Hungary	
200m breaststroke	2:18.96		Lisa Angiolini	Centro Sp.vo Carabinieri	12 December 2025	Italian Championships	Riccione, Italy	
50m butterfly	25.03	sf	Silvia Di Pietro	Italy	6 November 2021	European Championships	Kazan, Russia	
100m butterfly	56.06	sf	Elena Di Liddo	Italy	15 December 2018	World Championships	Hangzhou, China	
200m butterfly	2:04.07		Anita Gastaldi	Italy	7 December 2025	European Championships	Lublin, Poland	
100m individual medley	58.18		Costanza Cocconcelli	Fiamme Gialle	12 November 2026	Italian Championships	Riccione, Italy	
200m individual medley	2:06.17		Ilaria Cusinato	Italy	15 December 2018	World Championships	Hangzhou, China	
400m individual medley	4:26.06		Alessia Filippi	Italy	14 December 2008	European Championships	Rijeka, Croatia	
4×50m freestyle relay	1:34.30		Silvia Di Pietro (23.39); Sara Curtis (22.90); Agata Ambler (23.73); Costanza Cocconcelli (24.28)	Italy	2 December 2025	European Championships	Lublin, Poland	
4×100m freestyle relay	3:29.48		Erika Ferraioli (52.70); Silvia Di Pietro (52.30); Aglaia Pezzato (52.72); Federica Pellegrini (51.76)	Italy	5 December 2014	World Championships	Doha, Qatar	
4×200m freestyle relay	7:40.28		Giulia D'Innocenzo (1:54.49); Sofia Morini (1:53.88); Matilde Biagiotti (1:55.31); Anna Chiara Mascolo (1:56.60)	Italy	12 December 2024	World Championships	Budapest, Hungary	
4×50m medley relay	1:43.97		Costanza Cocconcelli (26.87); Benedetta Pilato (28.75); Silvia Di Pietro (25.19); Jasmine Nocentini (23.16)	Italy	7 December 2023	European Championships	Otopeni, Romania	
4×100m medley relay	3:50.36		Sara Curtis (57.41); Benedetta Pilato (1:04.30); Elena Capretta (57.01); Sofia Morini (51.64)	Italy	15 December 2024	World Championships	Budapest, Hungary	

Legend: # – Record awaiting ratification by Italian Swimming Federation; WR – World record; ER – European record; e – equalled existing record;
Records not set in finals: h – heat; sf – semifinal; r – relay 1st leg; rh – relay heat 1st leg; b – B final; † – en route to final mark; so – swim-off; tt – time trial

=== Mixed relay ===
Event	Time		Name	Club	Date	Meet	Location	Ref
4×50m freestyle relay	1:27.26	WR	Leonardo Deplano (20.97); Lorenzo Zazzeri (20.51); Silvia Di Pietro (23.07); Sara Curtis (22.71)	Italy	4 December 2025	European Championships	Lublin, Poland	
4×50m medley relay	1:36.01		Lorenzo Mora (22.59); Nicolò Martinenghi (24.83); Silvia Di Pietro (24.52); Costanza Cocconcelli (24.07)	Italy	14 December 2022	World Championships	Melbourne, Australia	
4×100m medley relay	3:35.54		Lorenzo Mora (50.11); Ludovico Viberti (57.08); Elena Capretta (56.77); Sara Curtis (51.58)	Italy	14 December 2024	World Championships	Budapest, Hungary	

Legend: # – Record awaiting ratification by Italian Swimming Association; e – equalled existing record;
Records not set in finals: h – heat; so – swim-off

== See also ==
- Italy national swimming team
