= Swimming at the 2022 European Aquatics Championships – Men's 50 metre breaststroke =

Men's 50 metre breaststroke at the 2022 European Aquatics Championships
- Venue: Foro Italico
- Dates: 15 August (heats and semifinals); 16 August (final)
- Competitors: 46 from 23 nations
- Winning time: 26.33

Medalists
gold medal	Nicolò Martinenghi	Italy
silver medal	Simone Cerasuolo	Italy
bronze medal	Lucas Matzerath	Germany

The Men's 50 metre breaststroke competition of the 2022 European Aquatics Championships was held on 15 and 16 August 2022.

== Records ==
Prior to the competition, the existing world, European and championship records were as follows.

	Name	Nationality	Time	Location	Date
World record European record	Adam Peaty	Great Britain	25.95	Budapest	25 July 2017
Championship record	Adam Peaty	Great Britain	26.09	Glasgow	8 August 2018

== Results ==
=== Heats ===
The heats were started on 15 August at 09:12.

Rank	Heat	Lane	Name	Nationality	Time	Notes
1	5	4	Nicolò Martinenghi	Italy	26.71	Q
2	3	4	Simone Cerasuolo	Italy	26.85	Q
3	4	5	Fabio Scozzoli	Italy	26.89	
4	3	3	Federico Poggio	Italy	27.07	
5	3	5	Lucas Matzerath	Germany	27.10	Q
6	4	4	Jan Kozakiewicz	Poland	27.32	Q
7	5	6	Peter John Stevens	Slovenia	27.38	Q
8	4	7	Volodymyr Lisovets	Ukraine	27.41	Q
9	5	5	Bernhard Reitshammer	Austria	27.42	Q
10	5	7	Olli Kokko	Finland	27.46	Q
11	5	3	Kristian Pitshugin	Israel	27.48	Q
12	4	6	Andrius Šidlauskas	Lithuania	27.52	Q
13	5	0	Valentin Bayer	Austria	27.57	Q
14	3	7	Tonislav Sabev	Bulgaria	27.58	Q, NR
15	4	2	Arkadios Aspougalis	Greece	27.62	Q
16	5	8	Carl Aitkaci	France	27.75	Q
17	3	8	Bartosz Skóra	Poland	27.81	Q
18	4	8	Antoine Viquerat	France	27.87	Q
19	4	3	James Wilby	Great Britain	27.93	
20	3	1	Heiko Gigler	Austria	28.00	
21	5	2	Jørgen Bråthen	Norway	28.01	
22	3	2	Gregory Butler	Great Britain	28.13	
23	2	4	Darragh Greene	Ireland	28.22	
24	4	9	Daniel Räisänen	Sweden	28.24	
25	3	6	Nicholas Lia	Norway	28.26	
26	5	9	Eoin Corby	Ireland	28.30	
27	4	1	Konstantinos Meretsolias	Greece	28.32	
28	3	0	Maksym Ovchinnikov	Ukraine	28.35	
29	4	0	Christoffer Haarsaker	Norway	28.38	
30	2	3	Panayiotis Panaretos	Cyprus	28.41	
31	3	9	Lyubomir Epitropov	Bulgaria	28.46	
32	5	1	Uroš Živanović	Serbia	28.47	
33	1	5	Maksym Tkachuk	Ukraine	28.80	
34	2	7	Constantin Malachi	Moldova	28.85	
35	2	6	Markos Iakovidis	Cyprus	28.88	
36	1	4	Emil Hassling	Sweden	28.89	
37	1	6	David Kyzymenko	Ukraine	28.91	
38	2	1	Matěj Zábojník	Czech Republic	28.97	
39	2	5	Ari-Pekka Liukkonen	Finland	29.04	
40	2	8	Luka Mladenovic	Austria	29.06	
41	1	3	Denis Svet	Moldova	29.07	
42	2	2	Savvas Thomoglou	Greece	29.28	
43	2	9	Aleksas Savickas	Lithuania	29.55	
44	1	2	Daniils Bobrovs	Latvia	29.59	
45	1	7	Luka Eradze	Georgia	29.64	
46	1	8	Raoul Stafrace	Malta	29.97	
	1	1	Giacomo Casadei	San Marino	Did not start	
	2	0	Oskar Hoff	Sweden	Did not start	

=== Semifinals ===
The semifinals were started at 18:29.

Rank	Heat	Lane	Name	Nationality	Time	Notes
1	2	4	Nicolò Martinenghi	Italy	26.64	Q
2	1	4	Simone Cerasuolo	Italy	26.86	Q
3	2	5	Lucas Matzerath	Germany	27.16	Q
4	2	6	Bernhard Reitshammer	Austria	27.19	q
5	2	3	Peter John Stevens	Slovenia	27.27	q
6	2	7	Valentin Bayer	Austria	27.34	q
6	1	3	Volodymyr Lisovets	Ukraine	27.34	Q
8	1	6	Olli Kokko	Finland	27.43	q
9	1	5	Jan Kozakiewicz	Poland	27.50	
10	2	1	Arkadios Aspougalis	Greece	27.55	
11	2	2	Kristian Pitshugin	Israel	27.68	
12	1	2	Andrius Šidlauskas	Lithuania	27.70	
13	1	1	Carl Aitkaci	France	27.73	
13	1	7	Tonislav Sabev	Bulgaria	27.73	
15	2	8	Bartosz Skóra	Poland	27.77	
16	1	8	Antoine Viquerat	France	27.98	

=== Final ===
The final was held at 18:12.

Rank	Lane	Name	Nationality	Time	Notes
1st place, gold medalist(s)	4	Nicolò Martinenghi	Italy	26.33	NR
2nd place, silver medalist(s)	5	Simone Cerasuolo	Italy	26.95	
3rd place, bronze medalist(s)	3	Lucas Matzerath	Germany	27.11	
4	7	Valentin Bayer	Austria	27.19	
5	8	Olli Kokko	Finland	27.26	NR
6	6	Bernhard Reitshammer	Austria	27.29	
7	1	Volodymyr Lisovets	Ukraine	27.59	
8	2	Peter John Stevens	Slovenia	27.74	
