= Swimming at the 2024 European Aquatics Championships – Men's 100 metre breaststroke =

Men's 100 metre breaststroke at the 2024 European Aquatics Championships
- Venue: Sports Centre Milan Gale Muškatirović
- Dates: 17 June (heats and semifinals); 18 June (final)
- Winning time: 58.84

Medalists
gold medal	Melvin Imoudu	Germany
silver medal	Berkay Öğretir	Turkey
bronze medal	Andrius Šidlauskas	Lithuania

The Men's 100 metre breaststroke competition of the 2024 European Aquatics Championships was held on 17 and 18 June 2024.

== Records ==
Prior to the competition, the existing world, European and championship records were as follows.

	Name	Nationality	Time	Location	Date
World record	Adam Peaty	Great Britain	56.88	Gwangju	21 July 2019
European record	Adam Peaty	Great Britain	56.88	Gwangju	21 July 2019
Championship record	Adam Peaty	Great Britain	57.10	Glasgow	4 August 2018

== Results ==
=== Heats ===
The heats were started on 17 June at 10:19.
Qualification Rules: The 16 fastest from the heats qualify to the semifinals.

Rank	Heat	Lane	Name	Nationality	Time	Notes
1	5	5	Andrius Šidlauskas	Lithuania	59.36	Q
2	4	4	Melvin Imoudu	Germany	59.43	Q
3	5	6	Ron Polonsky	Israel	1:00.07	Q
4	5	4	Lucas Matzerath	Germany	1:00.09	Q
5	3	4	Berkay Öğretir	Turkey	1:00.33	Q
6	3	2	Lyubomir Epitropov	Bulgaria	1:00.37	Q
7	3	5	Jan Kalusowski	Poland	1:00.39	Q
8	5	3	Darragh Greene	Ireland	1:00.53	Q
9	5	2	Valentin Bayer	Austria	1:00.61	Q
10	4	5	Bernhard Reitshammer	Austria	1:00.64	Q
11	4	3	Noel de Geus	Germany	1:00.66	
12	3	6	Jonathan Itzhaki	Israel	1:00.70	Q
13	3	3	Hüseyin Emre Sakçı	Turkey	1:00.73	Q
14	3	1	Kristian Pitshugin	Israel	1:01.11	
15	3	7	Volodymyr Lisovets	Ukraine	1:01.20	Q
16	4	7	Jérémy Desplanches	Switzerland	1:01.36	Q
17	4	6	Eoin Corby	Ireland	1:01.39	Q
18	5	8	Vojtech Netrh	Czech Republic	1:01.41	
19	4	2	Maksym Ovchinnikov	Ukraine	1:01.51	
20	3	8	Elias Elsgaard	Denmark	1:01.52	
21	4	0	João Reisen	Luxembourg	1:01.64	
22	2	6	Snorri Dagur Einarsson	Iceland	1:01.66	
23	5	7	Peter John Stevens	Slovenia	1:01.74	
24	2	3	Daniils Bobrovs	Latvia	1:01.88	
25	2	7	Denis Svet	Moldova	1:01.93	
26	5	1	Tonislav Sabev	Bulgaria	1:02.02	
27	3	9	Yakov Yan Toumarkin	Israel	1:02.13	
28	5	0	Christopher Rothbauer	Austria	1:02.15	
29	4	9	Jørgen Bråthen	Norway	1:02.21	
30	4	8	Georgios Aspougalis	Greece	1:02.38	
31	1	5	Einar Margeir Ágústsson	Iceland	1:02.39	
32	5	9	Jonas Gaur	Denmark	1:02.48	
33	2	9	Finn Kemp	Luxembourg	1:02.54	
34	3	0	Uiseann Cooke	Ireland	1:02.89	
35	2	2	Nusrat Allahverdi	Turkey	1:03.03	
36	2	5	Uroš Živanović	Serbia	1:03.14	
37	2	1	Olli Kokko	Finland	1:03.33	
38	2	8	Jovan Bojčić	Serbia	1:03.47	
39	2	4	Davin Lindholm	Finland	1:04.16	
40	1	4	Jami Ihalainen	Finland	1:04.24	
41	1	8	Vojtech Janecek	Czech Republic	1:04.35	
42	1	7	Marko Priednieks	Latvia	1:04.54	
43	1	2	Luka Eradze	Georgia	1:04.61	
44	1	1	Matiss Katkins	Latvia	1:04.67	
45	1	6	Julius Nyberg	Finland	1:04.78	
46	1	3	Matija Rađenović	Serbia	1:05.34	
47	1	0	Bartal Erlingsson Eidesgaard	Faroe Islands	1:05.70	
48	1	9	Even Qarri	Albania	1:05.70	
	2	0	Gian-Luca Gartmann	Switzerland	Did not start	

=== Semifinals ===
The semifinal were started on 17 June at 19:05.
Qualification Rules: The first 2 competitors of each semifinal and the remaining fastest (up to a total of 8 qualified competitors) from the semifinals advance to the final.

Rank	Heat	Lane	Name	Nationality	Time	Notes
1	1	4	Melvin Imoudu	Germany	59.28	Q
2	2	3	Berkay Ömer Öğretir	Turkey	59.54	Q
3	1	5	Lucas Matzerath	Germany	59.71	Q
4	2	6	Jan Kalusowski	Poland	59.77	Q, NR
5	1	2	Bernhard Reitshammer	Austria	59.98	Q
6	2	4	Andrius Šidlauskas	Lithuania	1:00.18	Q
7	1	6	Darragh Greene	Ireland	1:00.46	Q
8	1	3	Lyubomir Epitropov	Bulgaria	1:00.47	Q
9	2	7	Jonathan Itzhaki	Israel	1:00.58	
10	2	1	Volodymyr Lisovets	Ukraine	1:00.74	
11	2	8	Eoin Corby	Ireland	1:00.89	
12	2	2	Valentin Bayer	Austria	1:00.91	
13	1	7	Hüseyin Emre Sakçı	Turkey	1:01.5	
14	1	8	Vojtech Netrh	Czech Republic	1:01.24	
15	1	1	Jérémy Desplanches	Switzerland	1:01.67	
	2	5	Ron Polonsky	Israel	Disqualified	

=== Final ===
The final was held on 18 June at 18:48.

Rank	Lane	Name	Nationality	Time	Notes
1st place, gold medalist(s)	4	Melvin Imoudu	Germany	58.84	
2nd place, silver medalist(s)	5	Berkay Ömer Öğretir	Turkey	59.23	
3rd place, bronze medalist(s)	7	Andrius Šidlauskas	Lithuania	59.27	
4	3	Lucas Matzerath	Germany	59.33	
5	6	Jan Kalusowski	Poland	59.58	NR
6	2	Bernhard Reitshammer	Austria	1:00.13	
7	1	Darragh Greene	Ireland	1:00.28	
8	8	Lyubomir Epitropov	Bulgaria	1:00.34	
