= Swimming at the 2022 European Aquatics Championships – Men's 100 metre breaststroke =

Men's 100 metre breaststroke at the 2022 European Aquatics Championships
- Venue: Foro Italico
- Dates: 11 August (heats and semifinals); 12 August (final)
- Competitors: 46 from 24 nations
- Winning time: 58.26

Medalists
| gold medal | Nicolò Martinenghi | Italy |
| silver medal | Federico Poggio | Italy |
| bronze medal | Andrius Šidlauskas | Lithuania |

The Men's 100 metre breaststroke competition of the 2022 European Aquatics Championships was held on 11 and 12 August 2022.

== Records ==
Prior to the competition, the existing world, European and championship records were as follows.

| | Name | Nation | Time | Location | Date |
|---|---|---|---|---|---|
| World record European record | Adam Peaty | Great Britain | 56.88 | Gwangju | 21 July 2019 |
| Championship record | Adam Peaty | Great Britain | 57.10 | Glasgow | 4 August 2018 |

== Results ==
=== Heats ===
The heats were started on 11 August at 09:58.

| Rank | Heat | Lane | Name | Nationality | Time | Notes |
|---|---|---|---|---|---|---|
| 1 | 4 | 4 | Nicolò Martinenghi | Italy | 59.08 | Q |
| 2 | 5 | 4 | Arno Kamminga | Netherlands | 59.32 | Q |
| 3 | 3 | 5 | Federico Poggio | Italy | 59.49 | Q |
| 4 | 5 | 2 | Valentin Bayer | Austria | 59.76 | Q, NR |
| 5 | 5 | 5 | Andrius Šidlauskas | Lithuania | 1:00.17 | Q |
| 6 | 3 | 6 | Simone Cerasuolo | Italy | 1:00.51 | |
| 7 | 3 | 4 | James Wilby | Great Britain | 1:00.62 | Q |
| 8 | 5 | 3 | Matti Mattsson | Finland | 1:00.68 | Q |
| 9 | 4 | 6 | Andrea Castello | Italy | 1:00.72 | |
| 10 | 4 | 2 | Darragh Greene | Ireland | 1:00.75 | Q |
| 11 | 4 | 5 | Lucas Matzerath | Germany | 1:00.83 | Q |
| 12 | 3 | 3 | Bernhard Reitshammer | Austria | 1:00.86 | Q |
| 13 | 3 | 2 | Volodymyr Lisovets | Ukraine | 1:00.88 | Q |
| 14 | 5 | 1 | Antoine Viquerat | France | 1:00.90 | Q |
| 15 | 4 | 1 | Dawid Wiekiera | Poland | 1:01.09 | Q |
| 16 | 5 | 6 | Gregory Butler | Great Britain | 1:01.11 | Q |
| 17 | 4 | 8 | Lyubomir Epitropov | Bulgaria | 1:01.20 | Q |
| 18 | 5 | 7 | Kristian Pitshugin | Israel | 1:01.34 | QSO |
| 18 | 5 | 0 | Matěj Zábojník | Czech Republic | 1:01.34 | QSO |
| 20 | 4 | 7 | Daniel Räisänen | Sweden | 1:01.35 | |
| 21 | 5 | 8 | Christopher Rothbauer | Austria | 1:01.38 | |
| 22 | 3 | 1 | Tonislav Sabev | Bulgaria | 1:01.39 | |
| 23 | 2 | 2 | Maksym Ovchinnikov | Ukraine | 1:01.42 | |
| 24 | 4 | 3 | Eoin Corby | Ireland | 1:01.47 | |
| 25 | 3 | 8 | Carl Aitkaci | France | 1:01.63 | |
| 25 | 3 | 7 | Jan Kozakiewicz | Poland | 1:01.63 | |
| 27 | 4 | 9 | Arkadios Aspougalis | Greece | 1:01.93 | |
| 28 | 2 | 7 | Olli Kokko | Finland | 1:01.94 | |
| 29 | 2 | 4 | Christoffer Haarsaker | Norway | 1:02.39 | |
| 30 | 5 | 9 | Luka Mladenovic | Austria | 1:02.46 | |
| 31 | 2 | 5 | Bartosz Skóra | Poland | 1:02.57 | |
| 32 | 2 | 8 | David Kyzymenko | Ukraine | 1:02.59 | |
| 33 | 2 | 3 | Uroš Živanović | Serbia | 1:03.00 | |
| 34 | 3 | 0 | Aleksas Savickas | Lithuania | 1:03.04 | |
| 34 | 4 | 0 | Savvas Thomoglou | Greece | 1:03.04 | |
| 36 | 3 | 9 | Maksym Tkachuk | Ukraine | 1:03.07 | |
| 37 | 2 | 0 | Daniils Bobrovs | Latvia | 1:03.21 | |
| 38 | 1 | 6 | Emil Hassling | Sweden | 1:03.31 | |
| 39 | 2 | 9 | Constantin Malachi | Moldova | 1:03.36 | |
| 40 | 2 | 6 | Panayiotis Panaretos | Cyprus | 1:03.42 | |
| 41 | 1 | 5 | Giacomo Casadei | San Marino | 1:03.90 | |
| 42 | 1 | 4 | Denis Svet | Moldova | 1:03.98 | |
| 43 | 1 | 3 | Luka Eradze | Georgia | 1:05.75 | |
| 44 | 2 | 1 | Jørgen Bråthen | Norway | 1:08.45 | |
| 45 | 1 | 2 | Even Qarri | Albania | 1:09.19 | |
| 46 | 1 | 7 | Endi Kola | Albania | 1:12.67 | |

=== Swim-off ===
The swim-off was held on 11 August at 11:12.

| Rank | Lane | Name | Nationality | Time | Notes |
|---|---|---|---|---|---|
| 1 | 5 | Matěj Zábojník | Czech Republic | 1:00.63 | Q, NR |
| 2 | 4 | Kristian Pitshugin | Israel | 1:00.99 | |

=== Semifinals ===
The semifinals were started on 11 August at 18:35.

| Rank | Heat | Lane | Name | Nationality | Time | Notes |
|---|---|---|---|---|---|---|
| 1 | 2 | 4 | Nicolò Martinenghi | Italy | 58.44 | Q |
| 2 | 1 | 4 | Arno Kamminga | Netherlands | 59.29 | Q |
| 3 | 2 | 3 | Andrius Šidlauskas | Lithuania | 59.45 | Q |
| 4 | 1 | 5 | Valentin Bayer | Austria | 59.59 | Q, NR |
| 5 | 2 | 5 | Federico Poggio | Italy | 59.66 | q |
| 6 | 1 | 2 | Bernhard Reitshammer | Austria | 1:00.08 | q |
| 7 | 2 | 2 | Lucas Matzerath | Germany | 1:00.18 | q |
| 8 | 1 | 3 | James Wilby | Great Britain | 1:00.26 | q |
| 9 | 2 | 1 | Dawid Wiekiera | Poland | 1:00.49 | |
| 10 | 1 | 7 | Antoine Viquerat | France | 1:00.61 | |
| 11 | 2 | 6 | Matti Mattsson | Finland | 1:00.64 | |
| 12 | 1 | 8 | Matěj Zábojník | Czech Republic | 1:00.84 | |
| 13 | 2 | 8 | Lyubomir Epitropov | Bulgaria | 1:01.02 | |
| 14 | 2 | 7 | Volodymyr Lisovets | Ukraine | 1:01.21 | |
| 15 | 1 | 1 | Gregory Butler | Great Britain | 1:01.25 | |
| 16 | 1 | 6 | Darragh Greene | Ireland | 1:01.39 | |

=== Final ===
The final was held on 12 August at 18:18.

| Rank | Lane | Name | Nationality | Time | Notes |
|---|---|---|---|---|---|
| 1st place, gold medalist(s) | 4 | Nicolò Martinenghi | Italy | 58.26 | =NR |
| 2nd place, silver medalist(s) | 2 | Federico Poggio | Italy | 58.98 | |
| 3rd place, bronze medalist(s) | 3 | Andrius Šidlauskas | Lithuania | 59.50 | |
| 4 | 6 | Valentin Bayer | Austria | 59.54 | NR |
| 4 | 8 | James Wilby | Great Britain | 59.54 | |
| 6 | 1 | Lucas Matzerath | Germany | 59.64 | |
| 7 | 5 | Arno Kamminga | Netherlands | 59.68 | |
| 8 | 7 | Bernhard Reitshammer | Austria | 1:00.12 | |
