= 2022 FINA World Swimming Championships (25 m) – Men's 4 × 50 metre medley relay =

Swimming competition

Men's 4 × 50 metre medley relay at the 2022 FINA World Swimming Championships (25 m)
- Venue: Melbourne Sports and Aquatic Centre
- Location: Melbourne, Australia
- Dates: 17 December (heats and finals)
- Competitors: 85 from 17 nations
- Teams: 17
- Winning time: 1:29.72 WR

Medalists
| gold medal | Lorenzo Mora; Nicolò Martinenghi; Matteo Rivolta; Leonardo Deplano; Simone Cerasuolo; Thomas Ceccon; Alessandro Miressi | Italy |
| silver medal | Ryan Murphy; Nic Fink; Shaine Casas; Michael Andrew; Hunter Armstrong; Trenton Julian; Kieran Smith | United States |
| bronze medal | Isaac Cooper; Grayson Bell; Matthew Temple; Kyle Chalmers; Shaun Champion; Flynn Southam | Australia |

The Men's 4 × 50 metre medley relay competition of the 2022 FINA World Swimming Championships (25 m) was held on 17 December 2022.

== Records ==
Prior to the competition, the existing world and championship records were as follows.

| World record | Italy (ITA) | 1:30.14 | Kazan, Russia | 3 November 2021 |
| Competition record | Brazil (BRA) Russia (RUS) United States (USA) | 1:30.51 | Doha, Qatar Abu Dhabi, United Arab Emirates Abu Dhabi, United Arab Emirates | 4 December 2014 20 December 2021 20 December 2021 |

The following new records were set during this competition:

| Date | Event | Name | Nation | Time | Record |
|---|---|---|---|---|---|
| 17 December | Final | Lorenzo Mora (22.65); Nicolò Martinenghi (24.95); Matteo Rivolta (21.60); Leonardo Deplano (20.52) | Italy | 1:29.72 | WR |

== Results ==
=== Heats ===
The heats were started at 11:12.

| Rank | Heat | Lane | Nation | Swimmers | Time | Notes |
|---|---|---|---|---|---|---|
| 1 | 3 | 4 | Italy | Lorenzo Mora (23.61); Simone Cerasuolo (26.06); Thomas Ceccon (21.80); Alessandro Miressi (20.84) | 1:32.31 | Q |
| 2 | 3 | 7 | France | Yohann Ndoye-Brouard (23.44); Antoine Viquerat (26.18); Maxime Grousset (22.18); Florent Manaudou (20.73) | 1:32.53 | Q |
| 3 | 3 | 1 | Germany | Marek Ulrich (23.26); Lucas Matzerath (26.15); Marius Kusch (22.00); Josha Salchow (21.15) | 1:32.56 | Q |
| 4 | 2 | 5 | Japan | Ryosuke Irie (23.47); Yuya Hinomoto (25.94); Takeshi Kawamoto (22.19); Kosuke Matsui (21.05) | 1:32.65 | Q |
| 5 | 2 | 4 | United States | Hunter Armstrong (23.34); Nic Fink (25.60); Trenton Julian (22.39); Kieran Smith (21.34) | 1:32.67 | Q |
| 6 | 1 | 2 | Netherlands | Stan Pijnenburg (23.89); Caspar Corbeau (26.08); Nyls Korstanje (22.28); Kenzo Simons (20.95) | 1:33.20 | Q |
| 7 | 2 | 6 | Australia | Isaac Cooper (22.95); Grayson Bell (26.30); Shaun Champion (22.72); Flynn Southam (21.28) | 1:33.25 | Q |
| 8 | 1 | 3 | China | Wang Gukailai (24.14); Qin Haiyang (25.92); Chen Juner (22.52); Wang Haoyu (21.66) | 1:34.24 | Q |
| 9 | 2 | 3 | Ukraine | Oleksandr Zheltiakov (24.25); Volodymyr Lisovets (26.44); Andrii Govorov (22.76); Vladyslav Bukhov (20.90) | 1:34.35 | NR |
| 10 | 3 | 2 | Norway | Markuus Lie (23.62); Christoffer Tofte Haarsaker (26.35); Jon Jøntvedt (23.77); Nicholas Lia (20.69) | 1:34.43 | |
| 11 | 1 | 4 | Hong Kong | Hayden Kwan (24.38); Ng Yan Kin (27.43); Ng Cheuk Yin (22.59); Ian Ho (20.34) | 1:34.74 | NR |
| 12 | 1 | 5 | New Zealand | Zac Dell (24.39); Josh Gilbert (26.48); Cameron Gray (22.56); Carter Swift (21.43) | 1:34.86 | NR |
| 13 | 3 | 3 | Turkey | Doruk Tekin (24.42); Berkay Ömer Öğretir (26.39); Ümitcan Güreş (23.12); Emre Sakçı (21.30) | 1:35.23 | |
| 14 | 2 | 2 | South Africa | Pieter Coetze (22.96); Kian Keylock (28.64); Clayton Jimmie (23.26); Simon Haddon (22.28) | 1:37.14 | |
| 15 | 2 | 7 | Paraguay | Charles Hockin (24.50); Renato Prono (26.52); Ben Hockin (23.23); Matheo Mateos (22.93) | 1:37.18 | NR |
| | 1 | 6 | Brazil | Leonardo Coelho Santos (24.35); Caio Pumputis (26.69); Gabriel Santos; Lucas Peixoto | Disqualified | |
| | 3 | 6 | Chinese Taipei | Chuang Mu-lun (24.20); Wu Chun-feng (26.37); Wang Kuan-hung; Wang Hsing-hao | Disqualified | |
| | 1 | 7 | Spain | | Did not start | |
| | 3 | 5 | Canada | | Did not start | |

=== Final ===
The final was held at 19:43.

| Rank | Lane | Nation | Swimmers | Time | Notes |
|---|---|---|---|---|---|
| 1st place, gold medalist(s) | 4 | Italy | Lorenzo Mora (22.65); Nicolò Martinenghi (24.95); Matteo Rivolta (21.60); Leonardo Deplano (20.52) | 1:29.72 | WR |
| 2nd place, silver medalist(s) | 2 | United States | Ryan Murphy (22.61); Nic Fink (25.24); Shaine Casas (22.13); Michael Andrew (20.39) | 1:30.37 | AM |
| 3rd place, bronze medalist(s) | 1 | Australia | Isaac Cooper (22.66); Grayson Bell (25.92); Matthew Temple (21.75); Kyle Chalmers (20.48) | 1:30.81 | OC |
| 4 | 6 | Japan | Takeshi Kawamoto (22.93); Yuya Hinomoto (25.64); Yuya Tanaka (22.13); Masahiro Kawane (20.58) | 1:31.28 | AS |
| 5 | 5 | France | Mewen Tomac (22.96); Carl Aitkaci (26.01); Maxime Grousset (21.90); Florent Manaudou (20.54) | 1:31.41 | |
| 6 | 3 | Germany | Ole Braunschweig (23.09); Lucas Matzerath (25.87); Marius Kusch (21.72); Josha Salchow (21.11) | 1:31.79 | NR |
| 7 | 8 | China | Wang Gukailai (24.01); Yan Zibei (25.72); Chen Juner (22.52); Pan Zhanle (20.88) | 1:33.13 | NR |
| 8 | 7 | Netherlands | Stan Pijnenburg (24.05); Caspar Corbeau (26.27); Nyls Korstanje (22.27); Thom de Boer (20.84) | 1:33.43 | |
