= Circolo Canottieri Aniene =

Italian sports club

- Founded: 1892
- League: Italian Rowing Federation (FIC); Italian Swimming Federation (FIN); Italian Tennis Federation (FIT); Italian Sailing Federation (FIV)
- Based in: Rome
- Colors: Yellow & Blue
- President: Massimo Fabbricini
- Website: www.ccaniene.com

The Circolo Canottieri Aniene is an Italian multi-sport club based in Rome, founded in 1892.

== Main athletes ==
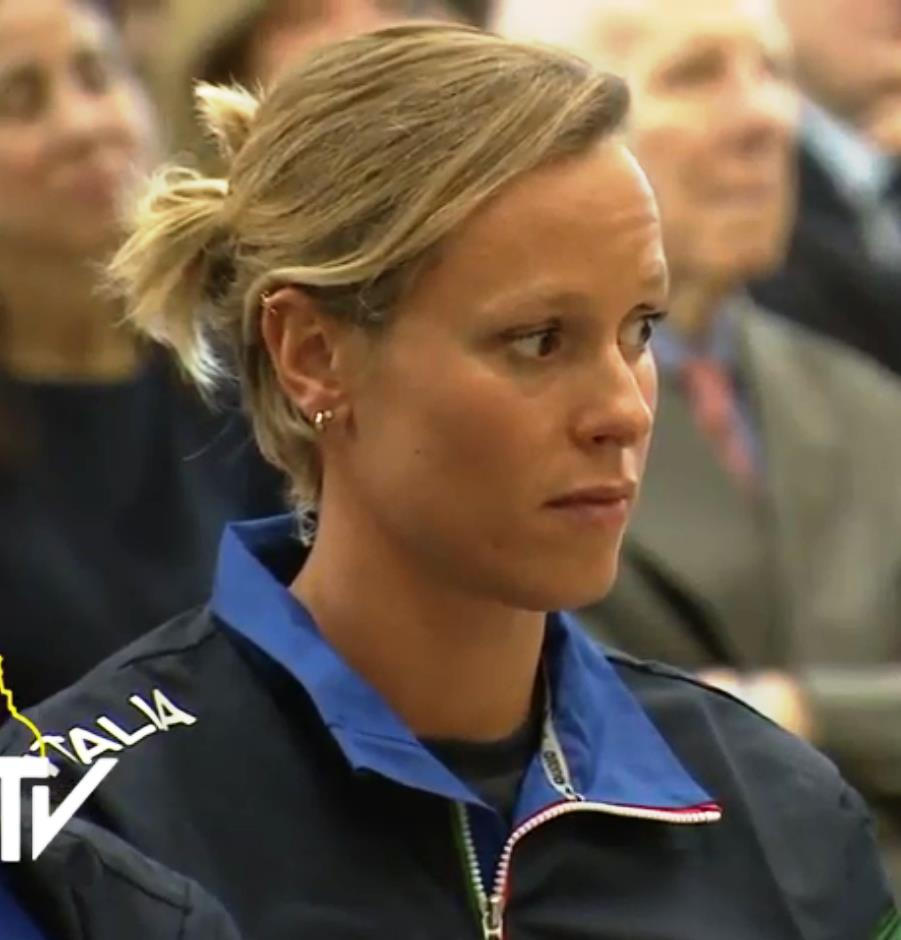
Federica Pellegrini, Olympic champion at Beijing 2008

Below is the list of the main athletes who have been in force in the Circolo Canottieri Aniene.

=== Swimming ===
- Nicolò Martinenghi
- Margherita Panziera
- Federica Pellegrini
- Benedetta Pilato

== See also ==
- Tennis in Italy
