= Nicolò Martinenghi =

Italian swimmer (born 1999)

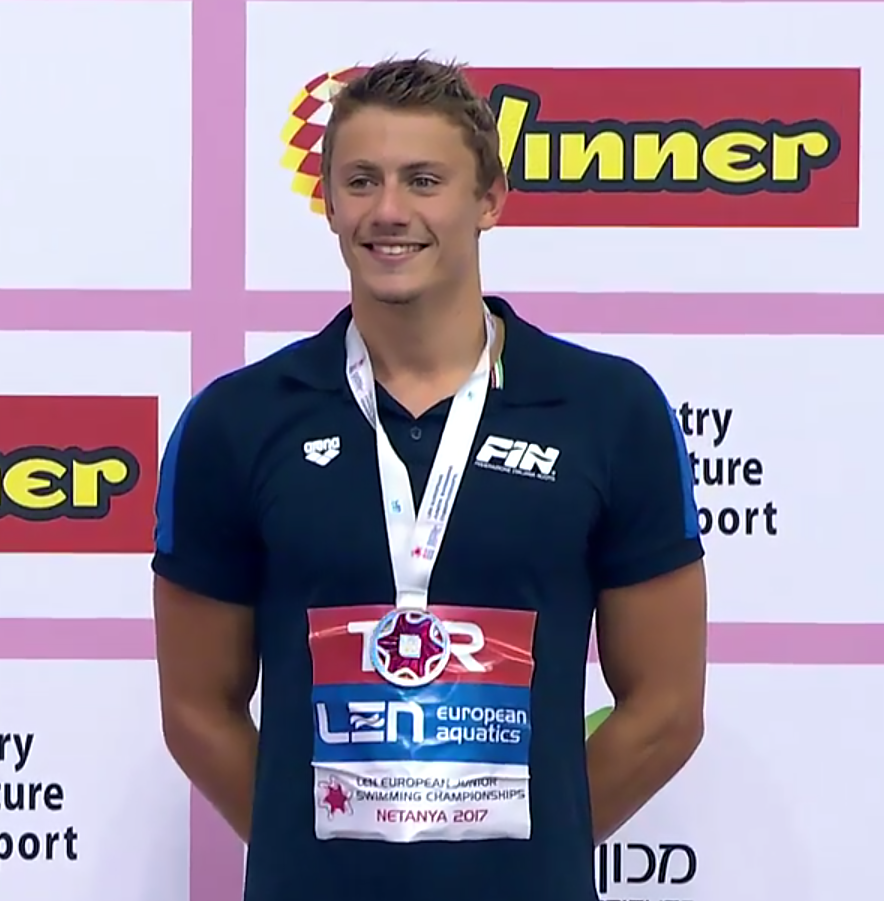
- Martinenghi in 2017

Personal information
- National team: Italy
- Born: 1 August 1999 (age 27) Varese, Italy
- Height: 1.87 m (6 ft 2 in)
- Weight: 94 kg (207 lb)

Sport
- Sport: Swimming
- Strokes: Breaststroke
- Club: CC Aniene
- Coach: Marco Pedoja
Medal record
Men's swimming
Representing Italy
| Event | 1st | 2nd | 3rd |
|---|---|---|---|
| Olympic Games | 1 | 0 | 2 |
| World Championships (LC) | 2 | 5 | 1 |
| World Championships (SC) | 2 | 5 | 3 |
| European Championships (LC) | 5 | 2 | 3 |
| European Championships (SC) | 5 | 3 | 2 |
| Total | 15 | 15 | 11 |
Olympic Games
| Gold medal – first place | 2024 Paris | 100 m breaststroke |
| Bronze medal – third place | 2020 Tokyo | 100 m breaststroke |
| Bronze medal – third place | 2020 Tokyo | 4×100 m medley |
World Championships (LC)
| Gold medal – first place | 2022 Budapest | 100 m breaststroke |
| Gold medal – first place | 2022 Budapest | 4×100 m medley |
| Silver medal – second place | 2022 Budapest | 50 m breaststroke |
| Silver medal – second place | 2023 Fukuoka | 100 m breaststroke |
| Silver medal – second place | 2024 Doha | 50 m breaststroke |
| Silver medal – second place | 2024 Doha | 100 m breaststroke |
| Silver medal – second place | 2025 Singapore | 100 m breaststroke |
| Bronze medal – third place | 2024 Doha | 4×100 m medley |
World Championships (SC)
| Gold medal – first place | 2021 Abu Dhabi | 4×100 m medley |
| Gold medal – first place | 2022 Melbourne | 4×50 m medley |
| Silver medal – second place | 2021 Abu Dhabi | 50 m breaststroke |
| Silver medal – second place | 2021 Abu Dhabi | 100 m breaststroke |
| Silver medal – second place | 2022 Melbourne | 50 m breaststroke |
| Silver medal – second place | 2022 Melbourne | 100 m breaststroke |
| Silver medal – second place | 2022 Melbourne | 4×50 m mixed medley |
| Bronze medal – third place | 2021 Abu Dhabi | 4×50 m medley |
| Bronze medal – third place | 2021 Abu Dhabi | 4×50 m mixed medley |
| Bronze medal – third place | 2022 Melbourne | 4×100 m medley |
European Championships (LC)
| Gold medal – first place | 2022 Rome | 50 m breaststroke |
| Gold medal – first place | 2022 Rome | 100 m breaststroke |
| Gold medal – first place | 2022 Rome | 4×100 m medley |
| Gold medal – first place | 2026 Paris | 50 m breaststroke |
| Gold medal – first place | 2026 Paris | 100 m breaststroke |
| Silver medal – second place | 2022 Rome | 4×100 m mixed medley |
| Silver medal – second place | 2026 Paris | 4×100 m medley |
| Bronze medal – third place | 2020 Budapest | 50 m breaststroke |
| Bronze medal – third place | 2020 Budapest | 4×100 m medley |
| Bronze medal – third place | 2020 Budapest | 4×100 m mixed medley |
European Championships (SC)
| Gold medal – first place | 2021 Kazan | 100 m breaststroke |
| Gold medal – first place | 2021 Kazan | 4×50 m medley |
| Gold medal – first place | 2023 Otopeni | 50 m breaststroke |
| Gold medal – first place | 2023 Otopeni | 4×50 m medley |
| Gold medal – first place | 2023 Otopeni | 4×50 m mixed medley |
| Silver medal – second place | 2017 Copenhagen | 4×50 m medley |
| Silver medal – second place | 2021 Kazan | 4×50 m mixed medley |
| Silver medal – second place | 2023 Otopeni | 100 m breaststroke |
| Bronze medal – third place | 2021 Kazan | 50 m breaststroke |
| Bronze medal – third place | 2025 Lublin | 50 m breaststroke |
European Youth Olympic Festival
| Gold medal – first place | 2015 Tbilisi | 100 m breaststroke |
| Gold medal – first place | 2015 Tbilisi | 200 m breaststroke |
| Gold medal – first place | 2015 Tbilisi | 4x100 m medley |

Nicolò Martinenghi (Italian: [nikoˈlɔ mmartiˈneŋɡi]; born 1 August 1999) is an Italian swimmer and the reigning Olympic champion in the 100 metre breaststroke event, having won the gold medal at the 2024 Summer Olympics. He is a two-time world record holder in the 4×50 metre medley relay, swimming breaststroke on both relays. He is the Italian record holder in the 50 metre breaststroke and 100 metre breaststroke (both long course and short course).

In the long course 100 metre breaststroke, Martinenghi won the gold medal at the 2022 World Aquatics Championships and the 2022 European Aquatics Championships, as well as the bronze medal at the 2020 Summer Olympics. In the short course version of the event, he was European champion in 2021 and won silver medals at the 2021 and 2022 World Short Course Championships. In the long course 50 metre breaststroke, he was European champion in 2022, World Aquatics Championships silver medalist in 2022, and European Aquatics Championships bronze medalist in 2021. For the short course event, he won a pair of silver medals in 2021 and 2022, one at the 2021 World Short Course Championships and one at the 2022 World Short Course Championships, and a bronze medal in 2021 at the year's European Short Course Championships. He won a gold medal in the 100m breaststroke at Paris 2024.

== Background ==
Martinenghi competes nationally and regionally as part of the Circolo Canottieri Aniene, CC Aniene, swim club. He is sponsored by Arena.

== Career ==
At the 2017 Italian National Championships in April 2017, Martinenghi set a new world junior record in the long course 50 metre breaststroke with a time of 26.97 seconds. Later in the year, in December at the 2017 European Short Course Swimming Championships, he achieved three world junior records, one in the 50 metre breaststroke in the semifinals before placing eighth in the final, one in the semifinals of the 100 metre breaststroke, and one in the final of the 100 metre breaststroke to place seventh, won a silver medal as part of the 4×50 metre medley relay for his efforts in the preliminaries, and placed fifteenth in the 200 metre breaststroke. In July 2019, he competed at the 2019 World Aquatics Championships in Gwangju, South Korea in the 100 metre breaststroke.

=== 2021 ===
==== 2020 European Aquatics Championships ====
At the 2020 European Aquatics Championships, held in May 2021 in Budapest, Hungary, with swimming contested at Danube Arena, Martinenghi placed fifth in the final of the 100 metre breaststroke with a time of 58.94 seconds, finishing 0.56 seconds ahead of fellow Italian Alessandro Pinzuti. Two days later, he won a bronze medal in the 4×100 metre mixed medley relay, contributing a split time of 58.05 seconds for the breaststroke leg of the relay to the final time of 3:42.30 and helping set a new Italian record in the event. On 22 May, two days later, he won a bronze medal in the 50 metre breaststroke, finishing in a time of 26.68 seconds to round out the podium with gold medalist Adam Peaty of Great Britain and Ilya Shymanovich of Belarus. In the 4×100 metre medley relay the following day, he won another bronze medal in Italian record time, helping set a new record with a final time of 3:29.93 by splitting a 57.84 for the breaststroke leg of the relay.

==== 2020 Summer Olympics ====
Martinenghi achieved an Italian selection time for the 2020 Summer Olympics in the 100 metre breaststroke in December 2019 at the Winter National Championships, swimming a new Italian record time of 58.75 seconds. At the Olympic Games, held in July and August 2021 in Tokyo, Japan, he swam a 58.28 in the semifinals of the 100 metre breaststroke to set a new Italian record in the event and qualify for the final. For the final, he won the bronze medal in a time of 58.33 seconds, finishing 0.96 seconds behind gold medalist Adam Peaty and 0.33 seconds behind silver medalist Arno Kamminga of the Netherlands. In the final of the 4×100 metre medley relay, he split a 58.11 for the breaststroke leg of the relay to help win the bronze medal in an Italian record time of 3:29.17. He also swam in the prelims heats of the relay where he split 57.94 for the breaststroke. His medals contributed to a total medal count of 40 for Italy, which was the most the country had ever earned at a single Olympic Games across all sports.

==== 2021 European Short Course Championships ====
For his first final at the 2021 European Short Course Swimming Championships, held in November at the Palace of Water Sports in Kazan, Russia, Martinenghi helped set a new world record of 1:30.14 and win the gold medal in the 4×50 metre medley relay, splitting a 25.14 for his 50 metre breaststroke portion of the relay. In the final of the 100 metre breaststroke the following day, he won the gold medal and became the European Short Course champion with an Italian record time of 55.63 seconds, which was 0.14 seconds faster than silver medalist Ilya Shymanovich. In the semifinals of the 50 metre breaststroke two days later, he set new Championships and Italian records with a time of 25.37 seconds to qualify for the final ranking first. The next day, he started the finals session with a bronze medal-win in the 50 metre breaststroke with a time of 25.54 seconds, finishing 0.29 seconds behind gold medalist Ilya Shymanovich who tied the world record set by Cameron van der Burgh in the event. He concluded the session helping win the silver medal in the 4×50 metre mixed medley relay, splitting a 25.13 to contribute to the final time of 1:36.39, which set a new Italian record and was 0.21 seconds slower than the gold medal-winning and world record-setting relay team for the Netherlands.

==== 2021 World Short Course Championships ====
In December, at the 2021 World Short Course Championships in Abu Dhabi, United Arab Emirates, Martinenghi won the silver medal in his first event, the 100 metre breaststroke, with a time of 55.80 seconds, which was 0.10 seconds slower than the gold medalist and world record holder in the event Ilya Shymanovich. Helping achieve a third-place finish with a 1:37.29 in the final of the 4×50 metre mixed medley relay for his second event, he won a bronze medal for his efforts. For his third event, he split a 25.30 for the breaststroke leg of the 4×50 metre medley relay, helping win the bronze medal with a final time of 1:30.78. In his fourth event, his second of two individual events, he won the silver medal in the 50 metre breaststroke with a time of 25.55 seconds. Concluding competition with his fifth event, he split a 55.94 for the breaststroke leg of the 4×100 metre medley relay to help achieve a new Championships and Italian record time of 3:19.76 with finals relay teammates Lorenzo Mora (backstroke), Matteo Rivolta (butterfly), and Alessandro Miressi (freestyle) and win the gold medal.

=== 2022 ===
At the 2022 Italian National Spring Championships in April, Martinenghi won the gold medal and national title in the 100 metre breaststroke with a 2022 World Aquatics Championships qualifying time of 58.57 seconds. He also won the 50 metre breaststroke with a World Championships qualifying time, of 26.49 seconds, finishing over three-tenths of a second ahead of silver medalist in the event Simone Cerasuolo.

==== 2022 World Aquatics Championships ====
In the preliminary heats of the 100 metre breaststroke at the 2022 World Aquatics Championships on 18 June, Martinenghi qualified for the semifinals ranking fourth with a time of 59.06 seconds. He ranked first in the evening semifinals, swimming a 58.46 to advance to the final the following day. He won the gold medal in the final the following day with an Italian record time of 58.26 seconds. In the prelims of the 50 metre breaststroke the following day, he ranked first with a time of 26.68 seconds and qualified for the semifinals. Finishing with a time of 26.56 seconds in the semifinals, he qualified for the final of the event ranking first. With a time of 26.48 seconds in the final, he won the silver medal, finishing three-hundredths of a second behind gold medalist Nic Fink of the United States and over two-tenths of a second ahead of bronze medalist Michael Andrew of the United States. Later in the same finals session, he swam the 100 metre breaststroke portion of the 4×100 metre mixed medley relay in a time of 57.93 seconds, helping achieve a fifth-place finish in 3:41.67. On the eighth and final day of competition, he split a 59.50 for the breaststroke leg of the 4×100 metre medley relay in the preliminaries, helping qualify the relay to the final ranking third. In the final, he lowered his split time to a 57.47, contributing to a gold medal win in a European record and Italian record time of 3:27.51.

==== 2022 European Aquatics Championships ====
The first day of the 2022 European Aquatics Championships, held in Rome in August, Martinenghi ranked first in the preliminaries of the 100 metre breaststroke, qualifying for the evening semifinals with a time of 59.08 seconds. Lowering his time to 58.44 seconds in the semifinals, he qualified ranking first to the final. In the final he won the gold medal, tying his Italian record time of 58.26 seconds. Later in the same session, he helped win a silver medal in the 4×100 metre mixed medley relay, splitting a 58.13 for the breaststroke leg in the final. On the fifth morning, he ranked first in the preliminaries of the 50 metre breaststroke, qualifying for the semifinals with a time of 26.71 seconds. In the semifinals, he won semifinal heat two with a 26.64, ranked first across both semifinals heats, and qualified for the final. The following day, he won the gold medal with an Italian record time of 26.33 seconds. For his final event of the Championships, he split a 57.72 for the breaststroke leg of the 4×100 metre medley relay in the final, helping set a new Championships record of 3:28.46 and win the gold medal.

==== 2022 Swimming World Cup ====
On day one of the 2022 FINA Swimming World Cup in Berlin, Germany, Martinenghi won a bronze medal in the 100 metre breaststroke, finishing in a time of 57.14 seconds and sharing the podium with Americans Nic Fink, gold medalist, and Reece Whitley, silver medalist. Day two, he improved upon his placement, this time winning the silver medal in the 50 metre breaststroke with a time of 26.12 seconds to finish only behind Nic Fink. After forgoing competition for the second stop, he returned for the third and final stop, in Indianapolis, United States, and placed fourth in the 100 metre breaststroke on day one with a time of 57.39 seconds. The following morning, he ranked third in the preliminary heats of the 50 metre breaststroke with a time of 26.54 seconds, which was 0.10 seconds slower than second-ranked João Gomes Júnior of Brazil and qualified him for the final. For the final, he lowered his time by 0.52 seconds to a 26.02 and won the silver medal. The final day of the World Cup, he placed twelfth in the 200 metre breaststroke with a time of 2:08.68.

==== 2022 World Short Course Championships ====
Finishing in a time of 56.60 seconds for the preliminaries of the 100 metre breaststroke on day two of the 2022 World Short Course Championships in Melbourne, Australia, Martinenghi advanced to the semifinals ranking first. In the evening, he helped achieved a European record time of 1:36.01 in the 4×50 metre mixed medley relay final to win the silver medal, splitting a 24.83 for the breaststroke portion. He followed up with a first-ranked time of 56.01 seconds in the semifinals of the 100 metre breaststroke, advancing to the final the following day. Following up with a time of 56.07 seconds in the final the next day, he won the silver medal.

On the morning of day five, Martinenghi ranked first in the preliminaries of the 50 metre breaststroke with a time of 25.71 seconds, qualifying for the semifinals three-tenths of a second ahead of second-ranked Adam Peaty. In the evening, he helped set a world record in the final of the 4×50 metre medley relay to win the gold medal, splitting a 24.95 for the breaststroke leg to contribute to the new world mark of 1:29.72 and break the former record of 1:30.41 he helped set in November 2021. In his final race of the evening, the semifinals of the 50 metre breaststroke, he ranked first with a time of 25.60 seconds and qualified for the final the following day. For the final of the 50 metre breaststroke on the sixth and final evening of competition, he achieved a silver-bronze finish with fellow Italian Simone Cerasuolo, finishing 0.26 seconds ahead of Cerasuolo in a time of 25.42 seconds to help accomplish the maneuver and mark the first time it was achieved at a World Short Course Championships by any two men from one country. In his final event of the evening, the final of the 4×100 metre medley relay, he split a 55.52 for the breaststroke leg to help win the bronze medal in a European record time of 3:19.06, which was 0.10 seconds faster than the world record in the event pre-start of race.

=== 2023 ===
At the 2023 Italian National Championships in April, Martinenghi achieved a 2023 World Aquatics Championships qualifying time of 59.06 in the final of the 100 metre breaststroke and won the silver medal. Splitting a 58.01 for the breaststroke leg of the 4×100 metre medley relay on day three, he helped the CC Aniene relay team place fourth in 3:37.66. On the fifth and final day, he repeated as national champion in the 50 metre breaststroke with a time of 26.90 seconds. For the 100 metre breaststroke at the 2023 Mare Nostrum in Barcelona, Spain, in May, he won in a time of 59.98 seconds.

==== 2024 Summer Olympics ====
At the 2024 Summer Olympics held in Paris, France, Martinenghi qualified for the final of the 100m breaststroke. In the final, Martinenghi beat both Adam Peaty and Nic Fink from Lane 7 to win the gold medal.

== International championships (50 m) ==
| Meet | 50 breaststroke | 100 breaststroke | 200 breaststroke | 4×100 medley | 4×100 mixed medley |
|---|---|---|---|---|---|
Junior level
| WJC 2015 | 2nd place, silver medalist(s) | 7th | 5th | DSQ | 6th |
| EJC 2016 | 2nd place, silver medalist(s) | 1st place, gold medalist(s) | 2nd place, silver medalist(s) | 1st place, gold medalist(s) | 1st place, gold medalist(s) |
| EJC 2017 | 1st place, gold medalist(s) | 1st place, gold medalist(s) | | 1st place, gold medalist(s) | 1st place, gold medalist(s) |
| WJC 2017 | 1st place, gold medalist(s) | 1st place, gold medalist(s) | 4th | 2nd place, silver medalist(s) | 5th |
Senior level
| WC 2017 | 9th | 9th | | 11th | 8th |
| WC 2019 | 14th | DSQ | | 13th | 6th^{[a]} |
| EC 2020 | 3rd place, bronze medalist(s) | 5th | | 3rd place, bronze medalist(s) | 3rd place, bronze medalist(s) |
| OG 2020 | —N/a | 3rd place, bronze medalist(s) | | 3rd place, bronze medalist(s) | 4th |
| WC 2022 | 2nd place, silver medalist(s) | 1st place, gold medalist(s) | | 1st place, gold medalist(s) | 5th |
| EC 2022 | 1st place, gold medalist(s) | 1st place, gold medalist(s) | | 1st place, gold medalist(s) | 2nd place, silver medalist(s) |

^{a} Martinenghi swam only in the prelims heats.

== International championships (25 m) ==
| Meet | 50 breaststroke | 100 breaststroke | 200 breaststroke | 4×50 medley | 4×100 medley | 4×50 mixed medley |
|---|---|---|---|---|---|---|
| EC 2017 | 8th | 7th | 15th | (silver) ^{[a]} | —N/a | |
| WC 2018 | 9th | 14th | | 4th^{[a]} | 9th | 5th^{[a]} |
| EC 2021 | 3rd place, bronze medalist(s) | 1st place, gold medalist(s) | | 1st place, gold medalist(s) | —N/a | 2nd place, silver medalist(s) |
| WC 2021 | 2nd place, silver medalist(s) | 2nd place, silver medalist(s) | | 3rd place, bronze medalist(s) | 1st place, gold medalist(s) | 3rd place, bronze medalist(s) |
| WC 2022 | 2nd place, silver medalist(s) | 2nd place, silver medalist(s) | | 1st place, gold medalist(s) | 3rd place, bronze medalist(s) | 2nd place, silver medalist(s) |
| EC 2023 | 1st place, gold medalist(s) | 2nd place, silver medalist(s) | | 1st place, gold medalist(s) | —N/a | 1st place, gold medalist(s) |

^{a} Martinenghi swam only in the prelims heats.

== Personal best times ==
=== Long course metres (50 m pool) ===
| Event | Time | Meet | Location | Date | Notes | Ref |
|---|---|---|---|---|---|---|
| 50 m breaststroke | 26.33 | 2022 European Aquatics Championships | Rome | 16 August 2022 | NR | |
| 100 m breaststroke | 58.26 | 2022 World Aquatics Championships 2022 European Aquatics Championships | Budapest, Hungary Rome | 19 June 2022 12 August 2022 | NR =NR | |
| 200 m breaststroke | 2:10.19 | 2020 Italian Open Championships | Riccione | 19 December 2020 | | |

Legend: NR – Italian record; e – equalled existing record;
Records not set in finals: h – heat; sf – semifinal; r – relay 1st leg; rh – relay heat 1st leg; b – B final; † – en route to final mark; so – swim-off; tt – time trial

=== Short course metres (25 m pool) ===
| Event | Time | | Meet | Location | Date | Notes | Ref |
|---|---|---|---|---|---|---|---|
| 50 m breaststroke | 25.37 | sf | 2021 European Short Course Championships | Kazan, Russia | 6 November 2021 | NR | |
| 100 m breaststroke | 55.63 | | 2021 European Short Course Championships | Kazan, Russia | 4 November 2021 | NR | |
| 200 m breaststroke | 2:03.98 | | 2022 Italian Short Course Championships | Riccione | 14 April 2022 | | |

Legend: NR – Italian record; e – equalled existing record;
Records not set in finals: h – heat; sf – semifinal; r – relay 1st leg; rh – relay heat 1st leg; b – B final; † – en route to final mark; so – swim-off; tt – time trial

== Swimming World Cup circuits ==
The following medals Martinenghi has won at Swimming World Cup circuits.

| Edition | Gold medals | Silver medals | Bronze medals | Total |
|---|---|---|---|---|
| 2019 | 1 | 3 | 0 | 4 |
| 2022 | 0 | 2 | 1 | 3 |
| Total | 1 | 5 | 1 | 7 |

== World records ==
=== Short course metres (25 m pool) ===
| No. | Event | Time | Meet | Location | Date | Status | Ref |
|---|---|---|---|---|---|---|---|
| 1 | 4×50 m medley relay | 1:30.14 (25.14) | 2021 European Short Course Championships | Kazan, Russia | 3 November 2021 | Former | |
| 2 | 4×50 m medley relay (2) | 1:29.72 (24.95) | 2022 World Short Course Championships | Melbourne, Australia | 14 December 2022 | Current | |

== Continental records ==
=== Long course metres (50 m pool) ===
| No. | Event | Time | Meet | Location | Date | Status | Notes | Ref |
|---|---|---|---|---|---|---|---|---|
| 1 | 4×100 m medley relay | 3:27.51 (57.47) | 2022 World Aquatics Championships | Budapest, Hungary | 25 June 2022 | Current | NR | |

Legend: NR – Italian record; e – equalled existing record;
Records not set in finals: h – heat; sf – semifinal; r – relay 1st leg; rh – relay heat 1st leg; b – B final; † – en route to final mark; so – swim-off; tt – time trial

=== Short course metres (25 m pool) ===
| No. | Event | Time | Meet | Location | Date | Status | Notes | Ref |
|---|---|---|---|---|---|---|---|---|
| 1 | 4×50 m medley relay | 1:30.14 (25.14) | 2021 European Short Course Championships | Kazan, Russia | 3 November 2021 | Former | Former WR, NR | |
| 2 | 4×50 m mixed medley relay | 1:36.01 (24.83) | 2022 World Short Course Championships | Melbourne, Australia | 14 December 2022 | Current | NR | |
| 3 | 4×50 m medley relay (2) | 1:29.72 (24.95) | 2022 World Short Course Championships | Melbourne, Australia | 17 December 2022 | Current | WR, NR | |
| 4 | 4×100 m medley relay | 3:19.06 (55.52) | 2022 World Short Course Championships | Melbourne, Australia | 18 December 2022 | Current | NR | |

Legend: WR – World record; NR – Italian record; e – equalled existing record;
Records not set in finals: h – heat; sf – semifinal; r – relay 1st leg; rh – relay heat 1st leg; b – B final; † – en route to final mark; so – swim-off; tt – time trial

== Honours and awards ==
- SwimSwam, Top 100 (Men's): 2022 (#22)

Records
| Preceded by (Russia) Kliment Kolesnikov, Kirill Prigoda, Aleksandr Popkov, Vladimir Morozov | Men's 4×50-metre medley relay world record holder 3 November 2021 – present With: Italy (breaststroke leg) | Succeeded by Incumbents |
