= 2022 FINA World Swimming Championships (25 m) – Mixed 4 × 50 metre medley relay =

Swimming competition

Mixed 4 × 50 metre medley relay at the 2022 FINA World Swimming Championships (25 m)
- Venue: Melbourne Sports and Aquatic Centre
- Location: Melbourne, Australia
- Dates: 14 December (heats and finals)
- Competitors: 139 from 32 nations
- Teams: 32
- Winning time: 1:35.15 WR

Medalists
gold medal	Ryan Murphy; Nic Fink; Kate Douglass; Torri Huske; Shaine Casas; Michael Andrew; Alexandra Walsh	United States
silver medal	Lorenzo Mora; Nicolò Martinenghi; Silvia Di Pietro; Costanza Cocconcelli; Simone Cerasuolo	Italy
bronze medal	Kylie Masse; Javier Acevedo; Ilya Kharun; Maggie Mac Neil; Ingrid Wilm; Rebecca Smith	Canada

The Mixed 4 × 50 metre medley relay competition of the 2022 FINA World Swimming Championships (25 m) was held on 14 December 2022.

== Records ==
Prior to the competition, the existing world and championship records were as follows.

World record	Netherlands (NED)	1:36.18	Kazan, Russia	7 November 2021
Competition record	Netherlands (NED)	1:36.20	Abu Dhabi, United Arab Emirates	18 December 2021

The following new records were set during this competition:

Date	Event	Name	Nation	Time	Record
14 December	Final	Ryan Murphy (22.37); Nic Fink (24.96); Kate Douglass (24.09); Torri Huske (23.73)	United States	1:35.15	WR

== Results ==
=== Heats ===
The heats were started at 11:05.

Rank	Heat	Lane	Nation	Swimmers	Time	Notes
1	2	4	United States	Shaine Casas (22.98); Michael Andrew (25.56); Kate Douglass (24.37); Alexandra Walsh (23.92)	1:36.83	Q
2	3	5	Germany	Ole Braunschweig (23.29); Anna Elendt (29.15); Marius Kusch (21.66); Angelina Köhler (23.80)	1:37.90	Q
3	3	1	Great Britain	Medi Harris (26.97); Adam Peaty (25.49); Ben Proud (22.42); Anna Hopkin (23.58)	1:38.46	Q
4	4	4	Netherlands	Kira Toussaint (26.37); Caspar Corbeau (26.26); Nyls Korstanje (22.13); Valerie van Roon (23.83)	1:38.59	Q
5	4	8	Japan	Miki Takahashi (26.66); Masaki Niiyama (26.19); Moe Tsuda (24.96); Kosuke Matsui (20.83)	1:38.64	Q
6	3	4	Italy	Lorenzo Mora (23.17); Simone Cerasuolo (26.46); Silvia Di Pietro (24.99); Costanza Cocconcelli (24.29)	1:38.91	Q
7	1	1	China	Wang Gukailai (23.94); Qin Haiyang (25.93); Wang Yichun (25.08); Wu Qingfeng (24.05)	1:39.00	Q
8	4	7	Canada	Ingrid Wilm (26.25); Javier Acevedo (25.74); Ilya Kharun (22.41); Rebecca Smith (24.61)	1:39.01	Q
9	4	5	Sweden	Hanna Rosvall (26.40); Klara Thormalm (29.40); Oskar Hoff (22.30); Isak Eliasson (21.16)	1:39.26	
10	1	8	Australia	Bradley Woodward (23.87); Grayson Bell (26.17); Alexandria Perkins (25.51); Meg Harris (23.86)	1:39.41	
11	2	1	New Zealand	Zac Dell (24.07); Josh Gilbert (26.11); Helena Gasson (25.39); Rebecca Moynihan (23.96)	1:39.53	NR
12	2	5	Austria	Caroline Pilhatsch (27.06); Bernhard Reitshammer (25.79); Simon Bucher (22.34); Lena Kreundl (24.52)	1:39.71	NR
13	3	2	Bulgaria	Gabriela Georgieva (27.91); Tonislav Sabev (25.89); Josif Miladinov (23.07); Diana Petkova (24.50)	1:41.37	
14	2	3	Hong Kong	Stephanie Au (27.49); Ng Yan Kin (27.92); Sze Hang Yu (25.93); Ian Ho (20.71)	1:42.05	NR
15	4	6	Slovakia	Tamara Potocká (27.77); Andrea Podmaníková (30.47); Ádám Halás (22.94); Matej Duša (21.05)	1:42.23	NR
16	2	2	Colombia	Santiago Corredor (24.77); Jorge Murillo (26.49); Sirena Rowe (26.16); Stefanía Gómez (25.04)	1:42.46	NR
17	3	3	South Africa	Milla Drakopoulos (28.04); Simon Haddon (27.69); Clayton Jimmie (23.05); Caitlin de Lange (24.29)	1:43.07	
18	1	6	Chinese Taipei	Chuang Mu-lun (24.57); Wu Chun-feng (26.80); Huang Mei-chien (26.21); Chen Szu-an (25.90)	1:43.48	
19	4	3	Turkey	Doruk Tekin (24.64); Emre Sakçı (25.71); Nida Eliz Üstündağ (27.34); Merve Tuncel (26.80)	1:44.49	
20	3	6	Dominican Republic	Elizabeth Jiménez (28.77); Josué Domínguez (26.40); Lara Krystal (27.31); Denzel González (22.25)	1:44.73	NR
21	4	1	Peru	Alexia Sotomayor (28.64); Javier Matta (26.58); Rafaela Fernandini (27.65); Joaquín Vargas (22.93)	1:45.80	NR
22	3	7	Bahamas	Lamar Taylor (24.19); Victoria Russell (32.28); Luke Thompson (24.50); Rhaniska Gibbs (25.96)	1:46.93	
23	3	8	Samoa	Kokoro Frost (26.31); Brandon Schuster (27.77); Olivia Borg (27.06); Kaiya Brown (26.77)	1:47.91	
24	2	6	Mongolia	Enkh-Amgalangiin Ariuntamir (29.60); Myagmaryn Delgerkhüü (29.31); Batbayaryn Enkhtamir (25.42); Batbayaryn Enkhkhüslen (25.64)	1:49.97	
25	1	7	Guatemala	Miguel Vásquez (25.18); Krista Jurado (34.25); Erick Gordillo (24.67); Lucero Mejía (26.11)	1:50.21	
26	2	7	Tanzania	Ria Save (32.74); Hilal Hilal (30.20); Collins Saliboko (25.05); Sophia Latiff (27.83)	1:55.82	
27	2	8	Northern Mariana Islands	Isaiah Alexsenko (25.84); Jinnosuke Suzuki (31.63); Maria Batallones (31.64); Shoko Litulumar (29.82)	1:58.93	
28	1	5	Papua New Guinea	Josh Tarere (29.64); Nathaniel Noka (31.70); Georgia-Leigh Vele (30.32); Jhnayali Tokome-Garap (29.19)	2:00.85	
29	1	3	Federated States of Micronesia	Tasi Limtiaco (27.01); Taeyanna Adams (37.68); Kestra Kihleng (31.60); Kyler Kihleng (26.46)	2:02.75	
30	1	2	Guam	Amaya Bollinger (36.58); Mia Lee (36.70); James Hendrix (26.18); Israel Poppe (23.50)	2:02.96	
31	4	2	Maldives	Aishath Sausan (33.74); Hamna Ahmed (38.12); Mohamed Shiham (27.95); Mubal Azzam Ibrahim (25.72)	2:05.53	NR
	1	4	Philippines	Jerard Jacinto (24.26); Jonathan Cock; Chloe Isleta; Jasmine Alkhaldi	Disqualified	

=== Final ===
The final was held at 19:35.

Rank	Lane	Nation	Swimmers	Time	Notes
1st place, gold medalist(s)	4	United States	Ryan Murphy (22.37); Nic Fink (24.96); Kate Douglass (24.09); Torri Huske (23.73)	1:35.15	WR
2nd place, silver medalist(s)	7	Italy	Lorenzo Mora (22.59); Nicolò Martinenghi (24.83); Silvia Di Pietro (24.52); Costanza Cocconcelli (24.07)	1:36.01	ER
3rd place, bronze medalist(s)	8	Canada	Kylie Masse (25.71); Javier Acevedo (25.95); Ilya Kharun (22.12); Maggie Mac Neil (23.15)	1:36.93	NR
4	3	Great Britain	Medi Harris (26.60); Adam Peaty (25.24); Ben Proud (21.93); Anna Hopkin (23.30)	1:37.07	NR
5	1	China	Wang Gukailai (23.74); Yan Zibei (25.41); Zhang Yufei (24.54); Wu Qingfeng (23.62)	1:37.31	AS
6	2	Japan	Miki Takahashi (26.69); Masaki Niiyama (25.81); Ai Soma (24.80); Kosuke Matsui (21.08)	1:38.38	
	5	Germany	Ole Braunschweig (22.98); Anna Elendt (28.67); Marius Kusch; Angelina Köhler	Disqualified	
	6	Netherlands	Kira Toussaint (25.91); Caspar Corbeau (25.65); Maaike de Waard (24.50); Thom de Boer	Disqualified	
