= Federico Poggio =

Italian swimmer (born 1998)

Personal information
- Nationality: Italy
- Born: 24 April 1998 (age 28) Voghera, Italy
- Height: 1.78 m (5 ft 10 in)
- Weight: 73 kg (161 lb)

Sport
- Sport: Swimming
Medal record
Men's swimming
Representing Italy
Event	1st	2nd	3rd
European Championships (LC)	1	1	0
European Championships (SC)	1	0	0
Total	2	1	0
European Championships (LC)
Gold medal – first place	2022 Roma	4×100 m medley
Silver medal – second place	2022 Rome	100 m breaststroke
European Championships (SC)
Gold medal – first place	2021 Kazan	4×50 m medley

Federico Poggio (born 24 April 1998) is an Italian swimmer. He competed at the 2020 Summer Olympics in Tokyo, Japan, where he placed 15th in the semifinals of the 100 metre breaststroke event with a time of 59.91 seconds after qualifying for the semifinals with a time of 59.33 seconds in the preliminary heats. In February 2022, he announced he was refocusing on coursework in sports science as he worked through some physical injuries that were affecting his swimming performances.

At the 2022 European Aquatics Championships, held in August in Rome, Poggio won the silver medal in the 100 metre breaststroke with a time of 58.98 seconds.
