= Jack Kelly (swimmer) =

Irish-American swimmer (born 2003)

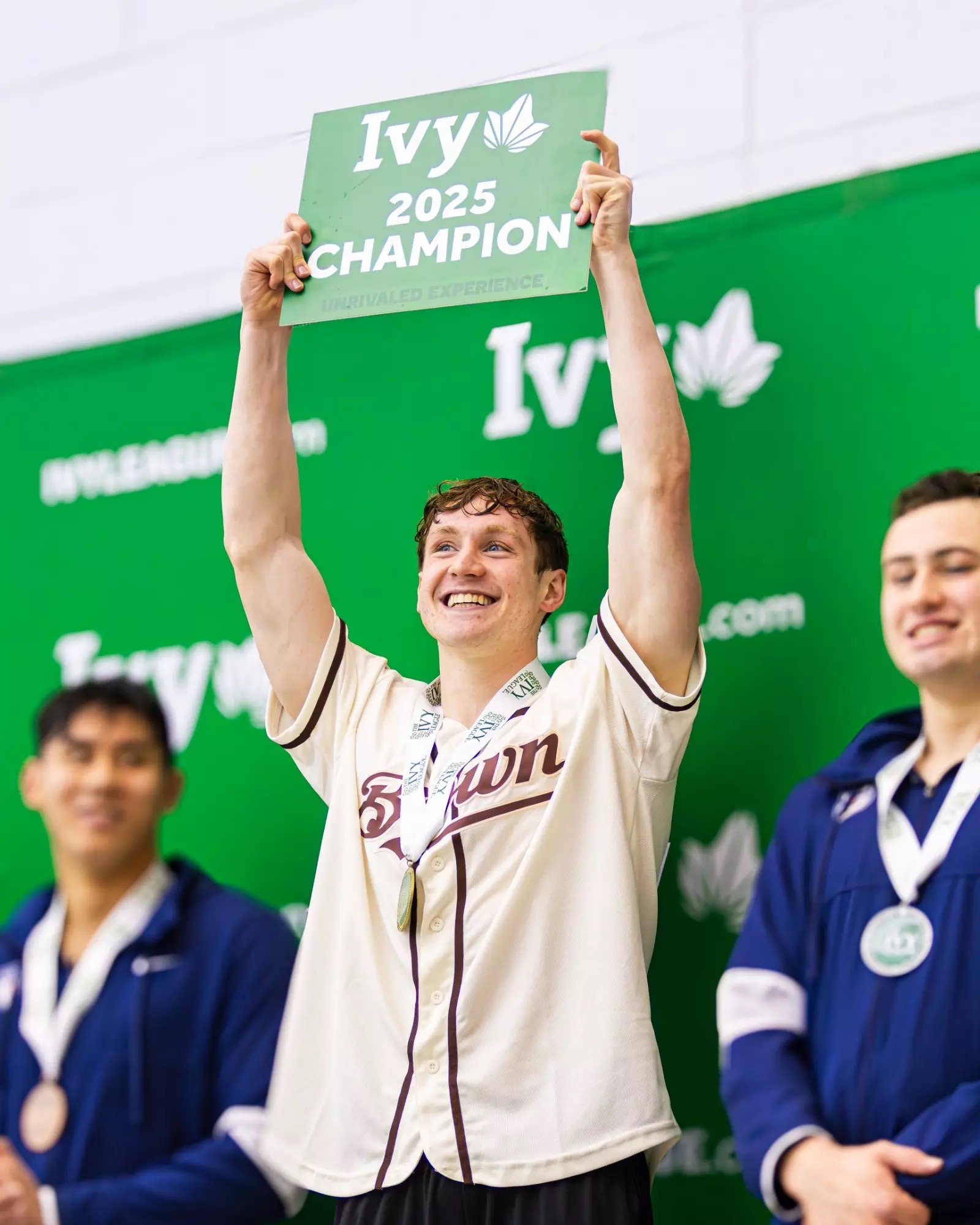
- Kelly in 2025

Personal information
- Full name: John Gerard Kelly
- Nickname: Jack
- Nationality: Ireland
- Born: July 22, 2003 (age 23) The Bronx, New York, U.S.
- Home town: Yonkers, New York, U.S.
- Height: 6 ft 1 in (185 cm)
- Weight: 190 lb (86 kg)

Sport
- Sport: Swimming
- Strokes: Breaststroke
- Club: New York Athletic Club (NYAC)
- College team: Brown University
- Coach: Bob Bowman (Current); Kevin Norman (Former)

John "Jack" Gerard Kelly (born July 22, 2003) is an American born Irish professional swimmer specializing in the breaststroke. A former collegiate standout at Brown University (2021–2025), he currently trains under Bob Bowman at the University of Texas at Austin. Kelly represents the New York Athletic Club (NYAC) and is the Irish Record holder in the 50m, 100m, and 200m breaststroke.

== Early Life ==
Kelly was born on July 22, 2003, in the Bronx, New York, to John and Clare Kelly. He was raised in Yonkers, New York, alongside his older brother James, twin sister Alanna, and younger sister Grace.

== High School Career ==
Kelly attended Fordham Preparatory School, graduating in 2021. During his time at Fordham Prep, he was a two-time team MVP and earned All-American honors twice for his achievements in the 100-yard breaststroke. He competed for the Empire Swim Club prior to his collegiate career. In his senior year, Kelly qualified for and competed in the 100m and 200m breaststroke at the 2021 U.S. Olympic Trials.

== Collegiate Career ==
Kelly attended Brown University from 2021 to 2025, where he majored in Mechanical Engineering and swam under Head Coach Kevin Norman. During his time at Brown, Kelly was a three-time NCAA Division I qualifier in the 100 and 200-yard breaststroke, and a three-time NCAA finalist.

He captured two Ivy League titles in the 100-yard breaststroke, and in 2025 set the Ivy League Record in the event with a time of 50.60. As team captain during his senior campaign, he led the Bears to a fourth-place finish at the Ivy League Championships. Kelly was honored with the Harold S. Ulen Career High Point Swimmer Award, recognizing his consistent excellence over four years of competition.

Kelly graduated from Brown in 2025 as a three-time All-American. He was Brown's first All-American swimmer since Carl Paulson in 1944, the first Brown swimmer to earn All-American honors in two events at the same NCAA championship, and the first Brown men's swimmer to earn Academic All-American honors. He was a recipient of the Joukowsky Scholar-Athlete Award, an honor given to Brown students who achieve success in both the classroom and athletic competition.

== Professional Career ==
=== 2025 ===
Kelly, representing the New York Athletic Club, launched his professional career in August 2025, moving to Austin, Texas, to swim under coach Bob Bowman. As part of the Longhorn pro group, Kelly trains alongside Olympians Léon Marchand, Shaine Casas, Luke Hobson, Carson Foster, Chris Guiliano, Hubert Kós, Regan Smith, Simone Manuel, and Summer McIntosh.

U.S. Open

Kelly won the gold medal in the 200m breaststroke (2:09.90) at the 2025 Toyota U.S. Open. He also placed third in the 100m breaststroke (59.72) and fifth in the 50m breaststroke (27.47).

=== 2026 ===
Irish Championships

Kelly competed at the Irish Championships, where he qualified for the Irish team for the 2026 European Aquatics Championships. Kelly won the 50m breaststroke (26.84), 100m breaststroke (59.90), and 200m breaststroke (2:12.55), setting Irish Open records in the 50m and 100m breaststroke events.

European Championships

Kelly competed in three events at the European Championships: the 50m, 100m, and 200m breaststroke. In the 100m breaststroke, he recorded a time of 59.27 in the preliminary heats, qualifying 4th for the semi-finals. He then swam 58.90 in the semi-final, breaking 59 seconds for the first time and qualifying 2nd for the final. In the final, he placed 7th with a time of 59.36. In the 200m breaststroke, Kelly clocked 2:10.14 in the preliminary heats, qualifying for the semi-finals, where he recorded 2:09.23 to qualify 5th for the final. He went on to finish 7th in the final with a time of 2:10.58. In the 50m breaststroke, he did not advance to the semi-finals, placing 22nd overall with a time of 27.37.

== Citizenship ==
Kelly is a dual Irish-American citizen whose family hails from Dunmanus, County Cork, Ireland. At the 2024 Irish Open Championships and Olympic Trials in Dublin, Kelly won silver in the 100m breaststroke (1:00.95) and bronze in the 200m breaststroke (2:13.11), competing for the ESB Swimming Club under Coach Cynthia Hurley.

== Awards and Honors ==
- 2020, 2021 High School All-American
- 2024, 2025 First Team All-Ivy League
- 2024, 2025 First Team All-American
- 2025 Academic All-American
- 2025 Harold S. Ulen Career High Point Swimmer Award
- 2025 Joukowsky Scholar-Athlete Award

== Personal Bests ==
=== Short course (25 yd) ===
| Event | Time | Meet | Location | Date |
|---|---|---|---|---|
| 100 yd Breaststroke | 50.60 | Ivy League Championships (M) | Providence, RI, U.S. | February 28, 2025 |
| 200 yd Breaststroke | 1:49.80 | Ivy League Championships (M) | Providence, RI, U.S. | March 1, 2025 |

=== Long course (50 m) ===
| Event | Time | Meet | Location | Date |
|---|---|---|---|---|
| 50 m Breaststroke | 26.84 NR | Irish Championships | Bangor, County Down, Ireland | April 9, 2026 |
| 100 m Breaststroke | 58.90 NR | 2026 European Championships | Paris, France | August 10, 2026 |
| 200 m Breaststroke | 2:09.23 NR | 2026 European Championships | Paris, France | August 11, 2026 |
