= Masaki Niiyama =

Japanese swimmer

Personal information
- Nationality: Japanese
- Born: 17 June 1993 (age 33)

Sport
- Sport: Swimming

Masaki Niiyama (born 17 June 1993) is a Japanese swimmer. He competed in the men's 50 metre breaststroke event at the 2018 FINA World Swimming Championships (25 m), in Hangzhou, China.
