= Simone Cerasuolo =

Italian swimmer (born 2003)

Personal information
- National team: Italy
- Born: 22 June 2003 (age 23) Emilia-Romagna, Italy
- Height: 1.88 m (6 ft 2 in)
- Weight: 89 kg (196 lb)

Sport
- Sport: Swimming
- Strokes: Breaststroke
- Club: GS Fiamme Oro; Imolanuoto
- Coach: Cesare Casella
Medal record
Men's swimming
Representing Italy
Event	1st	2nd	3rd
World Championships (LC)	1	0	0
World Championships (SC)	1	1	3
European Championships (LC)	0	2	1
European Championships (SC)	3	1	0
European Junior Championships	1	0	1
Total	6	4	5
World Championships (LC)
Gold medal – first place	2025 Singapore	50 m breaststroke
World Championships (SC)
Gold medal – first place	2022 Melbourne	4×50 m medley
Silver medal – second place	2022 Melbourne	4×50 m mixed medley
Bronze medal – third place	2022 Melbourne	50 m breaststroke
Bronze medal – third place	2022 Melbourne	4×100 m medley
Bronze medal – third place	2024 Budapest	4×100 m medley
European Championships (LC)
Silver medal – second place	2022 Rome	50 m breaststroke
Silver medal – second place	2026 Paris	50 m breaststroke
Bronze medal – third place	2026 Paris	100 m breaststroke
European Championships (SC)
Gold medal – first place	2025 Lublin	50 m breaststroke
Gold medal – first place	2025 Lublin	4×50 m medley
Gold medal – first place	2025 Lublin	4×50 m mixed medley
Silver medal – second place	2023 Otopeni	50 m breaststroke
European Junior Championships
Gold medal – first place	2021 Rome	50 m breaststroke
Bronze medal – third place	2021 Rome	100 m breaststroke

Simone Cerasuolo (born 22 June 2003) is an Italian competitive swimmer. He is the world junior record holder in the short course 50 metre and 100 metre breaststroke events. In the 50 metre breaststroke, he won a gold medal at the 2021 European Junior Championships, the silver medal at the 2022 European Aquatics Championships (long course), the bronze medal at the 2022 World Short Course Championships, and placed fifth at the 2022 World Aquatics Championships (long course). In the 100 metre breaststroke, he won the bronze medal at the 2021 European Junior Championships and placed sixth in the final at the 2022 World Short Course Championships.

== Early life ==
Cerasuolo was born 22 June 2003 in Italy. He has swum for GS Fiamme Oro and Imolanuoto in national and regional competitions, and is coached by Cesare Casella.

== Career ==
=== 2021 ===
On 25 April 2021, at the Italian Regional Championships of Emilia-Romagna, Cerasuolo set a new world junior record and European junior record in the short course 50 metre breaststroke event with a time of 26.26 seconds, which broke the former records of 26.31 set by Nicolò Martinenghi of Italy in 2017.

==== 2021 European Junior Championships ====
2021 European Junior Championships
Gold medal – first place	50 m breaststroke	27.29
Bronze medal – third place	100 m breaststroke	1:01.56

At the 2021 European Junior Swimming Championships in Rome, and held at the Stadio Olimpico del Nuoto, Cerasuolo swam a personal best time of 1:00.78 in the prelims heats of the 100 metre breaststroke. In the final of the 100 metre breaststroke the following day, 8 July, he placed third with a time of 1:01.56, winning the bronze medal in the event. Cerasuolo won the gold medal in the final of the 50 metre breaststroke with a time of 27.29 seconds, bringing his total medal count to two medals in individual events for the Championships.

==== 2021 Italian Short Course Championships ====
At the short course 2021 Italian National Championships in Riccione, Cerasuolo broke his own world junior and European junior records in the 50 metre breaststroke with an event winning time of 25.85 seconds. In the 100 metre breaststroke, Cerasuolo set new world junior and European junior records with a time of 56.66 seconds that won him the event by finishing over three tenths of a second ahead of the former world junior record holder and second-place finisher Nicolò Martinenghi.

=== 2022 ===
In April 2022, at the Italian National Spring Championships, conducted in long course metres, Cerasuolo swam a 1:00.59 in the prelims heats of the 100 metre breaststroke to qualify for the final ranking second. He won the silver medal in the final with a time of 1:00.62. On the fifth and final day, he swam a 27.28 in the preliminary round of the 50 metre breaststroke to qualify for the final ranking second. In the final, he won the silver medal with a personal best time of 26.85 seconds. His time of 26.85 seconds was fast enough to qualify him for the 2022 World Aquatics Championships in the event.

==== 2022 World Aquatics Championships ====
On the fourth day of competition at the 2022 World Aquatics Championships, held at Danube Arena in Budapest, Hungary, Cerasuolo swam a time of 27.17 seconds in the preliminaries of the 50 metre breaststroke and qualified for the semifinals ranking eighth across all prelims heats. For the semifinals later in the same day, he lowered his time to a 27.01, ranked fifth across both semifinals heats, and qualified for the final. In the final, he swam a time of 26.98 seconds to place fifth, finishing 0.26 seconds behind bronze medalist Michael Andrew of the United States.

The following month, at the 2022 Italian National Summer Championships in Ostia, Cerasuolo swam a personal best time of 1:00.08 in the 100 metre breaststroke to win the bronze medal, finishing 0.15 seconds ahead of fourth-place finisher Alessandro Pinzuti.

==== 2022 European Aquatics Championships ====
2022 European Championships (LC)
Silver medal – second place	50 m breaststroke	26.95

In the preliminaries of the 100 metre breaststroke on day one of the 2022 European Aquatics Championships, held in August in Rome, Cerasuolo ranked sixth with a time of 1:00.51 and did not qualify for the semifinals as he was not one of the two fastest Italian swimmers in the preliminaries. In a tight race for the top two spots by the Italians in the 50 metre breaststroke on day five, he ranked second, all of the top four spots were achieved by Italians, and qualified for the semifinals with a time of 26.85 seconds that equalled his personal best time. For the semifinals, he swam a 26.86 and qualified for the final ranking second. In the final, he won the silver medal with a time of 26.95 seconds, finishing only behind fellow Italian Nicolò Martinenghi.

==== 2022 World Short Course Championships ====
2022 World Championships (SC)
Gold medal – first place	4×50 m medley	1:29.72 (h)
Silver medal – second place	4×50 m mixed medley	1:36.01 (h)
Bronze medal – third place	50 m breaststroke	25.68
Bronze medal – third place	4×100 m medley	3:19.06 (h)

On the morning of day two of the 2022 World Short Course Championships in December in Melbourne, Australia, Cerasuolo split a 26.46 for the breaststroke leg of the 4×50 metre mixed medley relay to contribute to a time of 1:38.91 in the preliminaries that advanced the relay to the final ranking sixth. Later in the morning, he qualified for the semifinals of the 100 metre breaststroke ranking ninth across all preliminary heats with a time of 57.24 seconds. In the evening session, Nicolò Martinenghi substituted in for him on the relay and he won a silver medal for his efforts when the finals relay placed second in 1:36.01 before he achieved a 56.71 in the semifinals of the 100 metre breaststroke to qualify for the final ranking fifth. With a time of 56.99 seconds in the final, he placed sixth exactly 1.11 seconds behind gold medalist Nic Fink of the United States.

In his first of two events on the fifth morning, Cerasuolo swam the 50 metre breaststroke portion of the 4×50 metre medley relay in the preliminaries in a time of 26.06 seconds, helping qualify for the final ranking first with a 1:32.31. For his second race, the preliminaries of the 50 metre breaststroke, he qualified for the semifinals with a time of 26.16 seconds and overall seventh-rank. He won a gold medal in the 4×50 metre medley relay in the evening when the finals relay placed first in a time of 1:29.72. Afterwards, he achieved a personal best time of 25.66 seconds in the semifinals of the 50 metre breaststroke to qualify for the final ranking third.

Springing to action in the preliminaries of the 4×100 metre medley relay with a 57.83 for the breaststroke leg on the sixth and final morning, Cerasuolo helped advance the relay with a time of 3:23.81 to final ranking third. In the evening, he won his first individual medal at a World Championships, achieving a time of 25.68 seconds in the final of the 50 metre breaststroke to win the bronze medal and make history by becoming, along with Nicolò Martinenghi, the first-ever male duo from one county to win the silver and bronze medals in the event at a single edition of the World Short Course Championships. Later in the session, Nicolò Martinenghi substituted in for him on the finals relay of the 4×100 metre medley relay and he won a bronze medal for his contribution in the preliminaries when the finals relay placed third in 3:19.06.

=== 2023 ===
At the 2023 Italian National Championships in Riccione, Cerasuolo ranked second in the preliminaries of the 100 metre breaststroke on day two with a personal best time of 59.71 seconds and qualified for the evening final. He followed up with a 1:00.10 in the evening final, placing third. He won a national title and gold medal in the 4×100 metre medley relay the following day, swimming the breaststroke leg of the relay in 59.33 seconds, which contributed to a final relay time of 3:34.68 achieved with GS Fiamme Oro relay teammates Simone Stefani (backstroke), Thomas Ceccon (butterfly), and Alessandro Miressi (freestyle). He improved upon his individual placing from the 100 metre breaststroke in the 50 metre breaststroke, winning the silver medal with a time of 26.96 seconds.

== International championships (50 m) ==
Meet	100 freestyle	50 breaststroke	100 breaststroke	200 breaststroke	4×100 freestyle	4×100 medley	4×100 mixed freestyle	4×100 mixed medley
Junior level
EYOF 2019	6th		5th	DNS	9th	10th	4th	
EJC 2021		1st place, gold medalist(s)	3rd place, bronze medalist(s)			4th		DSQ
Senior level
WC 2022		5th						
EC 2022		2nd place, silver medalist(s)	6th (h)					

== International championships (25 m) ==
Meet	50 breaststroke	100 breaststroke	4×50 medley	4×100 medley	4×50 mixed medley
WC 2022	3rd place, bronze medalist(s)	6th	(gold) ^{[a]}	(bronze) ^{[a]}	(silver) ^{[a]}

^{a} Cerasuolo swam only in the preliminary heats.

== Personal best times ==
=== Long course metres (50 m pool) ===
Event	Time		Meet	Location	Date	Ref
50 m breaststroke	26.85	h	2022 Italian National Spring Championships 2022 European Aquatics Championships	Riccione Rome	13 April 2022 15 August 2022	
100 m breaststroke	59.71	h	2023 Italian National Championships	Riccione	14 April 2023	

Legend: h – heat

=== Short course metres (25 m pool) ===
Event	Time		Meet	Location	Date	Notes	Ref
50 m breaststroke	25.66	sf	2022 World Short Course Championships	Melbourne, Australia	17 December 2022		
100 m breaststroke	56.66		2021 Italian Short Course National Championships	Riccione	1 December 2021	WJ	

Legend: WJ – World Junior record; sf – semifinal

== World records ==
=== World junior records ===
==== Short course metres ====
No.	Event	Time	Meet	Location	Date	Age	Status	Ref
1	50 m breaststroke	26.26	2021 Italian Regional Championships	Riccione	25 April 2021	17	Former	
2	50 m breaststroke (2)	25.85	2021 Italian Short Course National Championships	Riccione	30 November 2021	18	Current	
3	100 m breaststroke	56.66	2021 Italian Short Course National Championships	Riccione	1 December 2021	18	Current	

== Honours and awards ==
- SwimSwam, Swim of the Week: 3 December 2021
