= Melvin Imoudu =

German swimmer (born 1999)

Personal information
- Nationality: German
- Born: 27 January 1999 (age 27) Schwedt, Germany
- Height: 1.98 m (6 ft 6 in)

Sport
- Sport: Swimming
- Club: Potsdamer SV
Medal record
Men's swimming
Representing Germany
European Championships (LC)
Gold medal – first place	2024 Belgrade	100 m breaststroke
Silver medal – second place	2024 Belgrade	4×100 m mixed medley

Melvin Imoudu (born 27 January 1999) is a German swimmer. He finished fourth in the 100 metre breaststroke at the 2024 Summer Olympics, after having a swim-off for the 8th spot in the final. He also won the same event at the 2024 European Aquatics Championships.
