= Ludovico Viberti =

Italian swimmer (born 2002)

Personal information
- Full name: Ludovico Blu Art Viberti
- National team: Italy
- Born: 8 February 2002 (age 24) Turin, Italy
- Height: 1.91 m (6 ft 3 in)
- Weight: 84 kg (185 lb)

Sport
- Sport: Swimming
- Strokes: Breaststroke
- Club: Fiamme Oro
- Coach: Antonio Satta
Medal record
Men's swimming
Representing Italy
Event	1st	2nd	3rd
World Championships (SC)	0	0	1
World University Games	0	2	0
Total	0	2	1
World Championships (SC)
Bronze medal – third place	2024 Budapest	4×100 m medley
European Championships (SC)
Gold medal – first place	2025 Lublin	4×50 m medley
Gold medal – first place	2025 Lublin	4×50 m mixed medley
World University Games
Silver medal – second place	2021 Chengdu	50 m breaststroke
Silver medal – second place	2021 Chengdu	4×100 m medley

Ludovico Blu Art Viberti (born 8 February 2002) is an Italian competitive swimmer who competed at the 2024 Summer Olympics.

== Name ==
Viberti's father wanted to call him "Blu", but his mother opposed it and so his father settled for giving him Blu as a middle name, together with Art, the diminutive of Arturo, after his grandfather.
