= Lucas Matzerath =

German swimmer (born 2000)

Personal information
- Full name: Lucas Joachim Matzerath
- Nationality: German
- Born: 3 May 2000 (age 26) Weinheim, Baden-Württemberg, Germany
- Height: 1.99 m (6 ft 6 in)

Sport
- Sport: Swimming
- Club: SG Frankfurt
Medal record
Men's swimming
Representing Germany
European Championships (LC)
Bronze medal – third place	2022 Rome	50 m breaststroke

Lucas Joachim Matzerath (born 3 May 2000) is a German swimmer. He competed in the men's 50 metre breaststroke event at the 2020 European Aquatics Championships, in Budapest, Hungary. He finished fifth in the 100 metre breaststroke at the 2024 Summer Olympics.
