= Volodymyr Lisovets =

Ukrainian swimmer (born 2004)

Personal information
- Native name: Володимир Володимирович Лісовець
- Full name: Lisovets Volodymyr Volodymyrovych
- Nationality: Ukrainian
- Born: 30 May 2004 (age 22) Zhytomyr, Ukraine

Sport
- Sport: Swimming
- Strokes: Breaststroke
Medal record
Men's swimming
Representing Ukraine
Event	1st	2nd	3rd
European Championships (LC)	0	0	1
European U23 Championships	0	2	0
European Junior Championships	3	1	4
Total	3	3	5
European Championships (LC)
Bronze medal – third place	2024 Belgrade	4×100 m medley
European U23 Championships
Silver medal – second place	2025 Samorin	50 m breaststroke
Silver medal – second place	2025 Samorin	100 m breaststroke
European Junior Championships
Gold medal – first place	2021 Rome	100 m breaststroke
Gold medal – first place	2022 Otopeni	50 m breaststroke
Gold medal – first place	2022 Otopeni	100 m breaststroke
Silver medal – second place	2022 Otopeni	4×100 m medley
Bronze medal – third place	2021 Rome	50 m breaststroke
Bronze medal – third place	2021 Rome	4×100 m medley
Bronze medal – third place	2021 Rome	4×100 m mixed medley
Bronze medal – third place	2022 Otopeni	4×100 m mixed medley

Volodymyr Volodymyrovych Lisovets (Ukrainian: Володимир Володимирович Лісовець, born 30 May 2004) is a Ukrainian swimmer. He is multiple European Junior Championships medalist.

== Early life and education ==
He was born on 30 May 2004 in Zhytomyr, Ukraine. He studied at the sport college in Brovary. Volodymyr is currently a student of Hryhorii Skovoroda University in Pereiaslav in physical culture department.

== Career ==
In 2021, he competed at the 2021 European Junior Swimming Championships, held in Rome, where he won bronze medals in medley relays and 50 m breaststroke events. He also received a gold medal in 100 m breaststroke at this European Junior Championships.

At the 2022 European Junior Swimming Championships he won two gold medals in 50 m and 100 m breaststroke and also silver and bronze medals in 4 × 100 m medley relay events.

He competed at the 2021 FINA World Swimming Championships (25 m) and 2022 FINA World Swimming Championships (25 m) in breaststroke events and medley relays without reaching any medals.

He competed at the 2022 European Aquatics Championships in 50 m breaststroke without reaching a medal (7th place).

He was one of the first competitors from Ukraine of the 2023 European U-23 Swimming Championships, held in Dublin, Ireland, where he competed in 50 m, 100 m and 200 m breaststroke without reaching any medals.

During the 2023-2024 season, Lisovets trained under coach Tobias Müller in Hamburg (Germany). During this period, Lisovets set a new Ukrainian national record in the 50m breaststroke (00:27.18) at the 2024 German Championships and qualified for the European Championships in Belgrade. At the 2024 European Aquatics Championships, held in Belgrade, Volodymyr received a bronze medal in the 4 × 100 m medley relay event.
