= Scott Spann =

Scott Spann may refer to:

- Scott Spann (swimmer), American swimmer
- Scott Spann (surgeon), his father, orthopaedic surgeon
