= 2015 USA Swimming Championships =

American swimming tournament

The 2015 Phillips 66 National Swimming Championships were held from August 6 to 10, 2015, at the Northside Swim Center in San Antonio, Texas.

== Men's events ==
Event	Gold		Silver		Bronze	
50 m freestyle	Caeleb Dressel	21.53	Cullen Jones	21.87	Josh Schneider	21.92
100 m freestyle	Caeleb Dressel	48.78	Jack Conger	49.05	William Copeland	49.09
200 m freestyle	Maxime Rooney	1:47.10	Zane Grothe	1:47.11	Blake Pieroni	1:47.30
400 m freestyle	Zane Grothe	3:45.98	Clark Smith	3:47.10	Townley Haas	3:48.69
1500 m freestyle	Jordan Wilimovsky	14:57.05	True Sweetser	15:10.73	PJ Ransford	15:14.04
100 m backstroke	Junya Koga	53.20	Nick Thoman	53.23	Luke Kaliszak	54.23
200 m backstroke	Jacob Pebley	1:56.66	Michael Taylor	1:58.10	Carter Griffin	1:58.38
100 m breaststroke	Andrew Wilson	59.65	Craig Benson	1:00.13	Brad Craig	1:00.63
200 m breaststroke	Craig Benson	2:09.68	Will Licon	2:10.02	Andrew Wilson	2:10.35
100 m butterfly	Michael Phelps	50.45	Jack Conger	51.33	David Nolan	52.15
200 m butterfly	Michael Phelps	1:52.94	Jack Conger	1:54.54	Pace Clark	1:56.84
200 m IM	Michael Phelps	1:54.75	Will Licon	1:58.43	Travis Mahoney	1:59.41
400 m IM	Gunnar Bentz	4:14.16	Travis Mahoney	4:17.00	Sean Grieshop	4:17.02

== Women's events ==
Event	Gold		Silver		Bronze	
50 m freestyle	Madison Kennedy	24.71	Amanda Weir	24.85	Kelsi Dahlia	25.01
100 m freestyle	Amanda Weir	54.24	Allison Schmitt	54.34	Madison Kennedy	55.02
200 m freestyle	Allison Schmitt	1:56.91	Hali Flickinger	1:58.18	Katie Drabot	1:58.58
400 m freestyle	Lindsay Vrooman	4:07.88	Hali Flickinger	4:07.93	Courtney Harnish	4:08.22
800 m freestyle	Lindsay Vrooman	8:28.13	Stephanie Peacock	8:28.25	Sarah Henry	8:29.45
100 m backstroke	Claire Adams	59.58	Georgia Davies	59.93	Ali DeLoof	1:00.36
200 m backstroke	Claire Adams	2:09.44	Danielle Galyer	2:09.75	Hali Flickinger	2:10.60
100 m breaststroke	Katie Meili	1:06.55	Lilly King	1:06.69	Laura Sogar	1:07.41
200 m breaststroke	Laura Sogar	2:23.54	Molly Hannis	2:25.57	Emma Schoettmer	2:26.41
100 m butterfly	Kelsi Dahlia	57.27	Felicia Lee	58.54	Christina Bechtel	58.74
200 m butterfly	Hali Flickinger	2:07.59	Cassidy Bayer	2:08.03	Christina Bechtel	2:09.20
200 m IM	Caitlin Leverenz	2:10.70	Madisyn Cox	2:10.75	Bethany Galat	2:12.13
400 m IM	Caitlin Leverenz	4:38.81	Sarah Henry	4:41.53	Madisyn Cox	4:41.75
