= 2016 NCAA Division I Men's Swimming and Diving Championships =

American college aquatic sports competition

2016 NCAA Division I Swimming and Diving Championships
- Host city: (Georgia (U.S. state)) Atlanta
- Date: March 23–26, 2016
- Venue(s): Georgia Tech Aquatic Center; Georgia Institute of Technology

The 2016 NCAA Division I Men's Swimming and Diving Championships were held on March 23–26 at the Georgia Institute of Technology in Atlanta. This event determined the team and individual 2016 national champions of Division I men's collegiate swimming and diving in the United States, and was the 93rd annual champion swim meet sanctioned by the NCAA.

The Texas Longhorns won the team championship, coming in 190 points ahead of the California Golden Bears. This win secured the Longhorns their second consecutive title and their twelfth title overall.

== Team rankings (top 10) ==
Note: Not all the competitors have been displayed in the rankings below. For the full results, click here.

Rank	Team	Points
1st place, gold medalist(s)	Texas Longhorns	541
2nd place, silver medalist(s)	California Golden Bears	351
3rd place, bronze medalist(s)	Florida Gators	334
4	NC State Wolfpack	314
5	Georgia Bulldogs	239
6	Alabama Crimson Tide	225
7	Tennessee Volunteers	188
8	Missouri Tigers	184
9	Indiana Hoosiers	180
10	Auburn Tigers	166
---	---	---
37	Georgia Tech Yellow Jackets (Hosts)	8

== Swimming Results ==
Event	Gold		Silver		Bronze	
50 yd freestyle	Caeleb Dressel; Florida	18.20; US, AR	Simonas Bilis; NC State	18.84	Kristian Gkolomeev; Alabama	18.95
100 yd freestyle	Caeleb Dressel; Florida	40.46; US, AR	Simonas Bilis; NC State	41.18	Kristian Gkolomeev; Alabama	41.52
200 yd freestyle	Townley Haas; Texas	1:30.46; US, AR	Matias Koski; Georgia	1:31.54	Simonas Bilis; NC State	1:32.10
500 yd freestyle	Townley Haas; Texas	4:09.00	Mitch D'Arrigo; Florida	4:09.98	Reed Malone; USC	4:12.55
1650 yd freestyle	Chris Swanson; Penn	14:31.54	Akaram Mahmoud; South Carolina	14:31.66	Matt Huchins; Wisconsin	14:33.09
100 yd backstroke	Ryan Murphy; California	43.49; US, AR	Connor Oslin; Alabama	45.32	Grigory Tarasevich; Louisville	45.33
200 yd backstroke	Ryan Murphy; California	1:35.73; US, AR	Jacob Pebley; California	1:38.50	Hennessey Stuart; NC State	1:38.56
100 yd breaststroke	Fabian Schwingenschlögl; Missouri	51.29	Peter Stevens; Tennessee	51.51	Michael Barnosky; Air Force	51.89
200 yd breaststroke	Will Licon; Texas	1:48.12; US, AR	Josh Prenot; California	1:49.38	Fabian Schwingenschlogl; Missouri	1:51.84
100 yd butterfly	Joseph Schooling; Texas	44.01; US	Caeleb Dressel; Florida	44.40	Jack Conger; Texas	44.87
200 yd butterfly	Joseph Schooling; Texas	1:37.97; US	Jack Conger; Texas	1:38.06; AR	Andrew Seliskar; California	1:39.95
200 yd IM	Will Licon; Texas	1:40.04	Josh Prenot; California	1:40.14	Ryan Murphy; California	1:40.27
400 yd IM	Josh Prenot; California	3:35.82	Will Licon; Texas	3:37.40	Jay Litherland; Georgia	3:38.47
4×50 yd freestyle relay	Texas; Brett Ringgold (19.07); Joseph Schooling (18.53); Jack Conger (18.74); John Murray (18.54)	1:14.88	NC State; Simonas Bilis (18.77); Joe Bonk (19.15); Anreas Schiellerup (18.89); Ryan Held (18.28)	1:15.09	Alabama; Kristian Gkolomeev (18.92); Laurent Bams (19.22); Lucas Kaliszak (18.95); Brett Walsh (19.07)	1:16.16
4×100 yd freestyle relay	NC State; Ryan Held (41.82); Simonas Bilis (40.80); Anreas Schiellerup (42.10); Soeren Dahl (42.09)	2:46.81	Texas; Brett Ringgold (41.61); Jack Conger (41.97); John Murray (42.12); Joseph Schooling (41.15)	2:46.85	Florida; Caeleb Dressel (40.86); Corey Main (42.06); Mark Szaranek (42.37); Jan Świtkowski (41.87)	2:47.16
4×200 yd freestyle relay	Texas; Jack Conger (1:31.89); Townley Haas (1:30.52); Clark Smith (1:33.28); Joseph Schooling (1:32.34)	6:08.03; US	NC State; Simonas Bilis (1:32.02); Ryan Held (1:32.06); Justin Ress (1:33.64); Soeren Dahl (1:31.86)	6:09.58	Florida; Paul Werner (1:33.11); Jan Świtkowski (1:31.33); Mitch D'Arrigo (1:32.69); Mark Szaranek (1:32.71)	6:09.84
4×50 yd medley relay	Alabama; Connor Oslin (20.86); Pasha Romanov (23.40); Lucas Kaliszak (20.02); Kristian Gkolomeev (18.00)	1:22.28	California; Ryan Murphy (20.20); Connor Hoppe (23.29); Justin Lynch (20.02); Tyler Messerschmidt (18.98)	1:22.49	Texas; John Shebat (20.94); Will Licon (23.30); Joseph Schooling (19.36); John Murray (19.15)	1:22.75
4×100 yd medley relay	Texas; John Shebat (45.36); Will Licon (50.69); Joseph Schooling (43.34); Jack Conger (41.29)	3:00.68; US	California; Ryan Murphy (43.51) US, AR; Josh Prenot (50.71); Justin Lynch (45.03); Long Gutierrez (42.03)	3:01.28	Louisville; Grigory Tarasevich (45.24); Carlos Claverie (51.62); Pedro Coutinho (45.85); Trevor Carroll (42.02)	3:04.73

Legend: US – U.S. Open record; AR – American record;

== Diving results ==
Event	Gold		Silver		Bronze	
1 m diving	Liam Stone; Tennessee	453.70	Rafael Quintero; Arizona	438.40	Zhipeng Zeng; Ohio State	435.50
3 m diving	Dominic Giordano; Pitt	460.30	Briadam Herrea; Miami	457.65	Cory Bowersox; Texas	420.50
Platform diving	Zhipeng Zeng; Ohio State	499.10	Rafael Quintero; Arizona	482.30	Scott Lazeroff; Auburn	436.75

== See also ==
- List of college swimming and diving teams
