= South Texas Swimming =

- Current season, competition or edition: 2022 Long Course Season
- Sport: Swimming
- General manager: Mark Parshall
- No. of teams: 46
- Country: United States

South Texas Swimming (ST) is the governing body for competitive swimming in South Texas. It is an LSC member of USA Swimming and the Southern Zone. Most of the athletes who compete in South Texas swim meets are youths under the age of 18. However, there are also opportunities for older members of the swimming community to compete.

== Location ==
South Texas is one of the 59 sub-divided areas by the National Governing Board, which is USA Swimming. The area that South Texas covers is Austin, Corpus Christi, Texas, McAllen, Texas, San Antonio, and Temple, Texas in South Texas

== Athlete Members ==
Nearly 5,000 individuals are registered South Texas athlete members. These athletes compete across 46 different swim clubs The level of competition across the clubs varies greatly, from recreational swimming to Olympians. Some of the notable athletes who have come from South Texas include Joshua Davis and Scott Spann.

== Competitions and Events ==
South Texas sanctions at least 50 swimming competitions per year. Most of these are competed in Short Course Yards and Long Course Meters.

== Governance ==
The South Texas LSC is run by its board of directors.
