= Will Licon =

American swimmer (born 1994)

- Licon at the 2017 NCAA Championships

Personal information
- Full name: William Andrew Licon
- National team: United States
- Born: August 25, 1994 (age 31) El Paso, Texas, U.S.
- Height: 6 ft 4 in (193 cm)
- Weight: 185 lb (84 kg)

Sport
- Sport: Swimming
- Strokes: Breaststroke, individual medley
- Club: LA Current; Longhorn Aquatics
- College team: University of Texas at Austin
- Coach: Eddie Reese, Kris Kubik
Medal record
Men's swimming
Representing the United States
Event	1st	2nd	3rd
World Championships (SC)	1	1	1
Pan American Games	2	0	0
Total	3	1	1
World Championships (SC)
Gold medal – first place	2021 Abu Dhabi	4×50 medley
Silver medal – second place	2021 Abu Dhabi	4×100 medley
Bronze medal – third place	2021 Abu Dhabi	200 m breaststroke
Pan American Games
Gold medal – first place	2019 Lima	200 m breaststroke
Gold medal – first place	2019 Lima	200 m medley
Junior Pan Pacific Championships
Silver medal – second place	2012 Honolulu	4×100 m medley
Representing the Texas Longhorns
Event	1st	2nd	3rd
NCAA Championships	11	2	1
Total	11	2	1
By race
Event	1st	2nd	3rd
100 y breaststroke	1	0	0
200 y breaststroke	3	0	0
200 y medley	2	1	0
400 y medley	1	1	0
4×50 y medley	1	0	1
4×100 y medley	3	0	0
Total	11	2	1
NCAA Championships
Gold medal – first place	2015 Iowa City	200 y breaststroke
Gold medal – first place	2015 Iowa City	400 y medley
Gold medal – first place	2015 Iowa City	4×100 y medley
Gold medal – first place	2016 Atlanta	200 y breaststroke
Gold medal – first place	2016 Atlanta	200 y medley
Gold medal – first place	2016 Atlanta	4×100 y medley
Gold medal – first place	2017 Indianapolis	100 y breaststroke
Gold medal – first place	2017 Indianapolis	200 y breaststroke
Gold medal – first place	2017 Indianapolis	200 y medley
Gold medal – first place	2017 Indianapolis	4×50 y medley
Gold medal – first place	2017 Indianapolis	4×100 y medley
Silver medal – second place	2015 Iowa City	200 y medley
Silver medal – second place	2016 Atlanta	400 y medley
Bronze medal – third place	2016 Atlanta	4×50 y medley

William Andrew Licon (/liːˈkoʊn/ lee-COHN; born August 25, 1994) is an American competitive swimmer who specializes in breaststroke and medley events. He previously competed for the professional team LA Current in the International Swimming League. Licon is a three-time World Championship medalist, a two-time Pan American Games gold medalist and has been a member of the United States national team since 2015. He is the current American record-holder and former NCAA & US Open record-holder in the 200-yard breaststroke.

Licon competed for the Texas Longhorns from 2013 to 2017 under head coach Eddie Reese and Associate Coach Kris Kubik where he was an 11-time NCAA champion, a 15-time All-American, and a 12-time Big 12 Conference champion. Additionally, Licon helped lead the Longhorns to three consecutive national championships in 2015, 2016, and 2017. He is only the fourth swimmer in collegiate history to win four individual NCAA titles in four different events. Concluding his collegiate career, Licon was voted the 2017 Big 12 Male Athlete of the Year.

== Early life ==
Will Licon was born in El Paso, Texas on August 25, 1994. There, he lived with his parents Robert and Nancy, as well as his younger siblings Michael and Elizabeth; all three of them were raised together as competitive swimmers. In the summer of 2001, Licon began his competitive swimming career by joining the El Paso Tennis Club "Fighting Frogs" summer league swim team at the age of six. After one season of summer league swimming and winning multiple City Championship events, Will's father advanced his now seven-year-old son to year-round club swimming. In the Fall of 2001, Robert created the USA Swimming club team West Texas Typhoons (WETT), where Licon swam for the next seven years of his career, breaking 50 individual Border Local Swim Committee (LSC) records during his tenure.

In 2009, Licon left El Paso and moved with his family to Plano, Texas. There, he joined the club team City of Plano Swimmers (COPS), where he swam for 2 years (2009–2011). While living in Plano, Licon attended Jasper High School (2009–2011) and swam for Plano Senior High School during his freshman year (2009–2010). At the 2010 5A Texas State Championships as a freshman, Licon placed third in the 200-yard medley relay, third in the 200-yard IM, and third in the 100-yard breaststroke. This would be the only time Licon would participate in high school swimming as he elected to forgo his remaining three years of eligibility. He still currently holds the Plano Senior High School record in the 200-yard medley relay.

In 2011, Licon moved to Austin, Texas at the age of 16 to swim for Nitro swim club, while the rest of his family moved back to El Paso. For his final two years of high school, Licon boarded with multiple host families in the surrounding Austin area to maintain an elite level of training that would best set him up for future athletic and academic success. "It was very hard the first couple of months. I was scared. I was on my own," Licon said. "It forced me to grow up on a whole new level."

Only months after moving cities, Licon won the 200-meter breaststroke at the 2011 Jr. National Championships, posting a 2:16.09. With this time, he finished ahead of his rival and future Olympic gold medalist Gunnar Bentz. In Austin, Licon attended Westlake High School for one semester before briefly moving back to El Paso. For two months in El Paso, he attended El Paso High School before moving back to Austin for the final time in 2012. Back in Austin, he enrolled into, and eventually graduated from Vista Ridge High School.

That summer, Licon competed in the 2012 United States Olympic Trials, finishing 19th in the 200-meter breaststroke which qualified him for the 2012 Jr. Pan Pacific Swimming Championships in Honolulu, Hawaii. In Hawaii, Licon posted a 2:14.53 in the 200-meter breaststroke to take fourth place. Individually, Licon also placed sixth in the 100-meter breaststroke (1:03.85) and competed in the preliminary swims of the 100-meter butterfly and the 200-meter individual medley. He concluded the meet with a silver medal performance in the 4×100-meter medley relay alongside future Longhorn teammates Jack Conger and Matt Ellis with a 1:02.86 breaststroke split. This silver medal became Licon's first international medal of his swimming career.

On October 19, 2012, Licon gave his verbal commitment to swim at the University of Texas at Austin and signed his letter of intent on November 14, 2012.

== College career ==
=== 2014 NCAA Championships ===
In his debut season as a freshman at the 2014 NCAA Division I Men's Swimming and Diving Championships, Licon placed fifth in the 400-yard individual medley, setting a school record for the Longhorns with a time of 3:40.84. He also finished 12th in the 200-yard breaststroke and 14th in the 200-yard individual medley.

The Longhorns finished second to the California Golden Bears for the men's NCAA team title, scoring 417.5 points to Cal's 468.5.

=== 2015 NCAA Championships ===
2015 NCAA Championships
Gold medal – first place	200 y breaststroke	1:49.48
Gold medal – first place	400 y medley	3:36.37
Gold medal – first place	4×100 y medley	3:01.23 (US)
Silver medal – second place	200 y medley	1:40.09

At the 2015 NCAA Championships during his breakout sophomore year, Licon won two individual titles, one relay title, and earned a second place finish. In his first event, Licon was runner-up to Stanford’s David Nolan in the 200-yard IM while producing a lifetime-best by over a second and a half, going 1:40.09. This made Licon the third-fastest performer of all time in the event. Nolan’s time of 1:39.38 was a new American record.

Licon then joined Kip Darmody, Joseph Schooling, and Jack Conger to win the 4×100-yard medley relay in a new NCAA and U.S. Open record time of 3:01.23, just out-touching the California Golden Bears (3:01.60) for gold. The Longhorns were ineligible for the American record because Schooling represented Singapore internationally. Licon also won the 400-yard individual medley in a time of 3:36.37, defeating the American record-holder and 2-time defending champion Chase Kalisz by 3.14 seconds. Licon became the fourth fastest performer of all time in this event, and it was the first time in history that a Texas Longhorns swimming and diving male athlete had won the 400 IM at the NCAA Championships.

In his last race of the meet, Licon went head-to-head against American record-holder and reigning NCAA champion Kevin Cordes in the 200-yard breaststroke. Licon edged out Cordes by 5-hundredths of a second (1:49.48 to 1:49.53). With this swim, Licon became just the second swimmer in history to break 1:50 in the 200-yard breaststroke.

Licon’s breakout performance at the 2015 NCAA Division I Men's Swimming and Diving Championships helped the Longhorns win their first team title since 2010. It was the Longhorns' 11th NCAA men's team title overall.

=== 2016 NCAA Championships ===
2016 NCAA Championships
Gold medal – first place	200 y breaststroke	1:48.12 (NR)
Gold medal – first place	200 y medley	1:40.04
Gold medal – first place	4×100 y medley	3:00.68 (US)
Silver medal – second place	400 y medley	3:37.40
Bronze medal – third place	4×50 y medley	1:22.75

Competing at the 2016 NCAA Championships in his junior season, Licon won the 200-yard individual medley with a 1:40.04, ahead of future Olympic silver medalist Josh Prenot (1:40.14) and future 3-time Olympic gold medalist and world record-holder Ryan Murphy (1:40.27). Licon’s time broke the pool record previously held by 12-time Olympic medalist Ryan Lochte (1:40.08), which was the former American record just over a year prior.

Licon won the 200-yard breaststroke with a 1:48.12, beating second place Prenot by 1.26 seconds. His time broke the NCAA, American, and U.S. Open record previously owned by Kevin Cordes (1:48.66) by over half a second. Licon's first 100-yard split of 51.81 surprisingly broke Brendan Hansen's school and conference record in the 100-yard breaststroke of 51.96 in the process. Licon also earned second place in the 400 individual medley behind Josh Prenot, with a 3:37.40 effort, and a third place finish in the 4×50-yard medley relay.

Licon joined John Shebat, Joseph Schooling, and Jack Conger to help Texas win the 400-yard medley relay for the second straight year with a new NCAA and U.S. Open record of 3:00.68, splitting a 50.69 on the breaststroke leg. Licon's efforts helped Texas win the 2016 NCAA Division I Men's Swimming and Diving Championships, winning back-to-back team titles.

=== 2017 NCAA Championships ===
2017 NCAA Championships
Gold medal – first place	100 y breaststroke	50.68
Gold medal – first place	200 y breaststroke	1:47.91 (NR)
Gold medal – first place	200 y medley	1:40.67
Gold medal – first place	4×50 y medley	1:21.54 (US)
Gold medal – first place	4×100 y medley	2:59.22 (US)

As he wrapped up his senior year, Licon competed at the 2017 NCAA Championships with winning times in all his individual and relay races. In his first event, Licon won the 200-yard individual medley, tying University of Florida’s Mark Szaranek for top of the podium at 1:40.67. Later that same night, Licon joined Shebat, Schooling, and Conger in the 4×100-yard medley relay one last time to replace their previous NCAA and U.S. Open record with a time of 2:59.22, including a 49.75 breaststroke split from Licon. That swim marked the first time in history that any team had cracked the 3-minute barrier in the 4×100-yard medley relay, and Licon's 49.75 split was only the second time in history that a swimmer had cracked the 50-second barrier on a relay start.

Licon followed up his wins in the 200-yard individual medley and the 4×100-yard medley relay with another victory in the 100-yard breaststroke (50.68) over Missouri's Fabian Schwingenschlögl (50.77). That time made Licon the second-fastest performer in history behind Kevin Cordes. Later that session, Licon joined teammates Shebat, Schooling and Brett Ringgold in the 200-yard medley relay, splitting 22.91 on the breaststroke leg to take first place in a new NCAA and U.S. Open record of 1:21.54.

On his final night of collegiate swimming, Licon took down his own American, NCAA, and U.S. Open records in the 200-yard breaststroke with a 1:47.91, beating second place Anton McKee by 3.31 seconds. Licon’s opening 100 split of his 200 breaststroke (51.42) would have placed 4th in the individual 100 breaststroke race at the 2017 NCAA Championships. Licon became the first swimmer in history to break the barrier of 1:48.00 in the 200-yard breaststroke.

Licon's undefeated performance was a significant factor in helping the Texas Longhorns swimming and diving team win the 2017 NCAA Division I Men's Swimming and Diving Championships, secure the Longhorns' third consecutive team title, and win the Longhorn men's 13th national championship in total.

=== Collegiate accolades ===
Licon finished his career at the University of Texas with 11 NCAA titles (7 individual, 4 relay), 18 All-America honors, 16 Big 12 Conference titles, 6 school and Big 12 Conference records, and was named the Big 12 Men’s Swimmer of the Year twice (2015, 2017). He became the fourth swimmer in collegiate history — and first in 17 years — to win 4 NCAA individual titles in 4 different events during his career.

==== Big 12 Male Athlete of the Year ====
Concluding his NCAA career in 2017, Licon “joined a rare group that includes Ricky Williams, Derrick Johnson and Vince Young” by becoming the first swimmer ever and the fifth Longhorn to win the Big 12 Male Athlete of the Year award. Licon shared the award with Kansas Jayhawks point guard and 2017 AP Player of the Year, Frank Mason III.

==== Big 12 Men’s Swimmer of the Year (2015) ====
Licon was voted the Big 12 Conference Men's Swimmer of the Year by league coaches after his breakout sophomore season where he defeated a pair of American record-holders back-to-back en route to his first individual NCAA titles in the 400 IM and 200 breaststroke. He was also a member of the NCAA and U.S. Open record-setting 4×100 medley relay that placed first. He placed second in the 200 IM behind another American record-holder, which brought his NCAA Championship medal haul to three golds and one silver. Licon was also a factor in the Longhorns' sweep of the 2015 Big 12 Championship, claiming event titles in the 200 IM, 400 IM and 200 breast.

==== Big 12 Men's Swimmer of the Year (2017) ====
After his senior campaign, Licon was voted the Big 12 Conference Men's Swimmer of the Year for a second time. He became the first Big 12 swimmer in history to win 3 individual events at a single NCAA Championships, doing so in the 200 IM, 100 breast, and 200 breast. Licon broke his previous NCAA, American, and U.S. Open records in the 200 breast, as well as the NCAA and U.S. Open records in the 4×50 and 4×100 medley relays. The senior completed his college career with Big 12 and University of Texas program records in the 100 and 200 breast, the 200 and 400 IM, and the 200 and 400 medley relays. In his NCAA career, Licon became the fourth swimmer in the history of college swimming and the first Big 12 swimmer to win four separate individual events at the NCAA Championships.

==== El Paso Athletic Hall of Fame ====
On May 2, 2018, a year after his collegiate career had ended, Licon was inducted into the El Paso Athletic Hall of Fame, being amongst the company of Don Haskins and Bobby Joe Hill from the legendary 1965–66 Texas Western Miners men's basketball team, National Collegiate Basketball Hall of Famers Nolan Richardson and Nate Archibald, professional golfer Lee Trevino, and former American record-holding swimmer Lara Jackson.

== International career ==
=== 2014 U.S. Summer Nationals ===
After his first year of collegiate swimming, Licon placed seventh in the 200-meter breaststroke at the 2014 Phillips 66 Summer National Championships with a time of 2:11.68. He also placed 13th in the 200-meter individual medley (2:01.44) and 13th in the 400-meter individual medley (4:20.79).

=== 2015 U.S. Summer Nationals ===
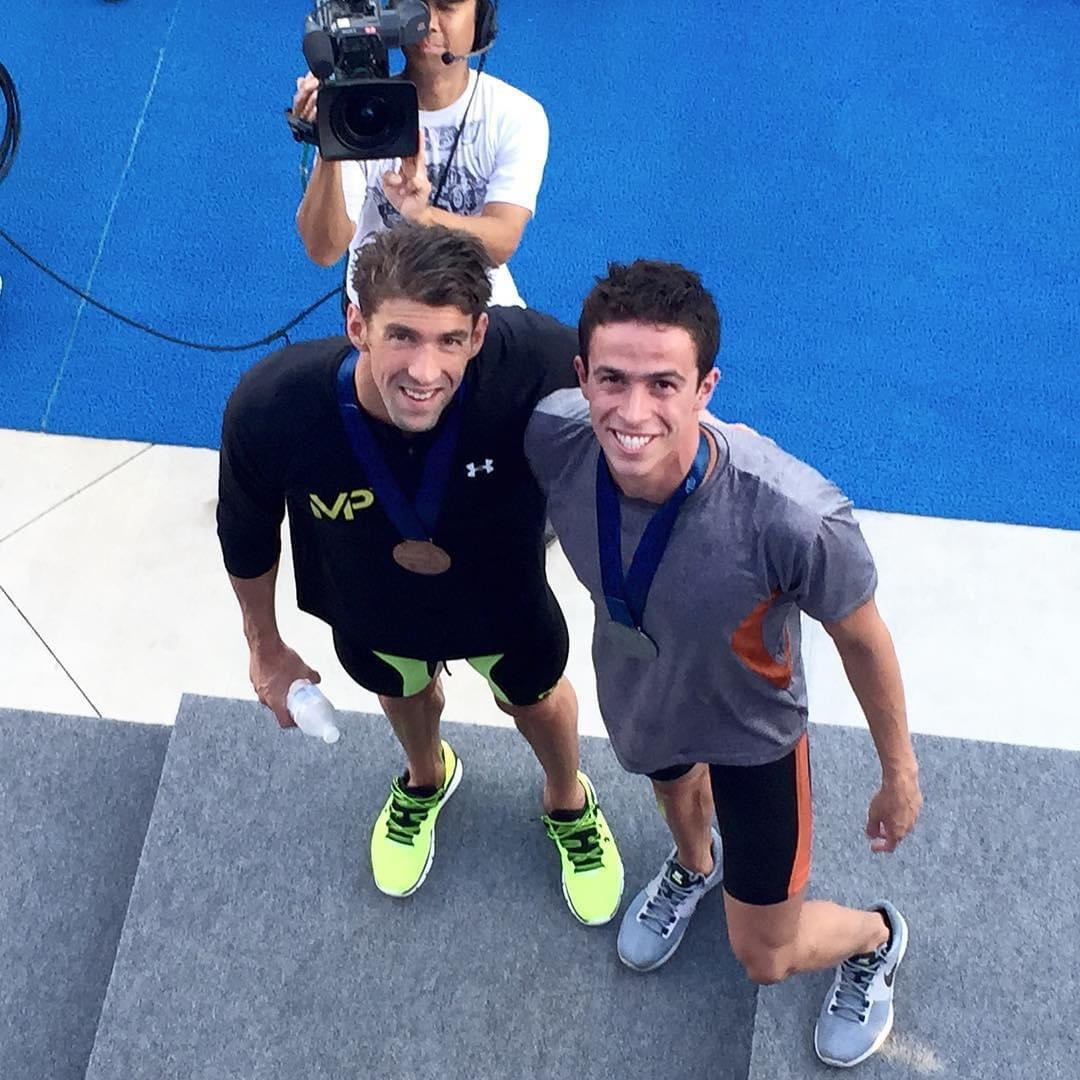
Michael Phelps and Licon (right) pose on the podium after the 200 breast finals at the 2015 U.S. Summer Nationals.

Following a breakout NCAA season, but recovering from mononucleosis that took five weeks out of his training, Licon entered Summer Nationals in San Antonio, Texas as a threat to win multiple events.

After swimming the fastest overall time in the preliminaries of the 200-meter individual medley, Licon was seeded one position ahead of Michael Phelps headed into the finals, but ultimately got silver behind Phelps with a personal best time of 1:58.43.

In the 200-meter breaststroke, Licon placed second, behind Great Britain's Craig Benson with a personal best time of 2:10.02. Despite the loss, Licon finished ahead of Michael Phelps who swam in the same race.

=== 2016 U.S. Olympic Trials ===
Following a stellar NCAA season just a few months prior, Licon entered the 2016 U.S. Olympic Trials in Omaha with potential to make the Olympic team. His best bet on claiming a roster spot was in the 200 breaststroke, due to the 200 IM spots being dueled between Olympic icons Michael Phelps and Ryan Lochte. Despite just breaking the American Record in the short course 200-yard breaststroke, Licon wasn't the favorite to win the event going into Trials. Kevin Cordes was coming off a silver medal-performance in the 200-meter breaststroke from the 2015 World Championships in Kazan, and he had been producing the fastest times among U.S. swimmers in both breaststroke events since 2013.

In the finals of the 200-meter breaststroke at Olympic Trials, Cordes split first at the 100-meter mark with a 1:00.77 ahead of Licon's 1:01.45 split and almost a second under the world record pace. At the 150-meter mark, Licon turned in third place behind Cordes and just behind Josh Prenot, with all 3 swimmers still under the world record pace. At the finish, Cordes touched 14-hundredths ahead of third-place Licon with times of 2:08.00 and 2:08.14, respectively. Licon also finished eighth in the 100-meter breaststroke final, recording a 1:00.61.

=== 2017 ===
==== U.S. Summer Nationals ====
In the 200-meter breaststroke, Licon ultimately swam a 2:09.68 for fifth place, well off his personal best time that he set the year prior. He also placed sixth in the 100-meter breaststroke with a 1:00.67 and sixth as well in the 200-meter individual medley with a 1:58.90. His swims in the 200-meter breaststroke and the 200-meter individual medley qualified him for the 2017 World University Games in Taipei, Taiwan.

==== World University Games ====
At the 2017 World University Games, Licon was named co-captain of Team USA, alongside teammates Ryan Held, Ella Eastin, and Ali DeLoof. He finished seventh in the 200-meter breaststroke with a time of 2:10.75 and ninth in the 200-meter individual medley with a 2:01.44, just missing the A final in the latter.

=== 2018 U.S. Summer Nationals ===
Licon came in third place in the 200-meter breaststroke, posting a time of 2:08.72. Andrew Wilson placed second with a time of 2:08.71, finishing 1-hundredth of a second ahead of Licon, which ultimately kept Licon from competing in the 2018 Pan Pacific Swimming Championships. Licon also placed eighth in the 100-meter breaststroke (1:00.53) and ninth in the 200-meter individual medley, winning the B Final in 1:59.39. His times in the 200 breaststroke and the 200 individual medley qualified himself for the 2019 Pan American Games in Lima, Peru.

=== 2019 Pan American Games ===
2019 Pan American Games
Gold medal – first place	200 m breaststroke	2:07.62 (GR)
Gold medal – first place	200 m medley	1:59.13

With his first international breakout swim meet of his career, Will Licon produced a lifetime-best in the 200-meter breaststroke, winning his first major international medal in 2:07.62 over countryman Nic Fink (2:08.16) to break the previous Pan American Games record of 2:09.82. That time placed Licon at seventh in the world in 2019 for that event, as well as making him the fastest American in 2019.

In his second event, he matched his previous gold medal with another gold in the 200 IM by taking down Brazilians Caio Pumputis and Leonardo Coelho Santos with a time of 1:59.13. Licon's gold in the 200-meter individual medley was the first time that a United States male swimmer won this event at the Pan American Games since Ron Karnaugh's victory in 1991.

=== 2020 ===
==== COVID-19 Pandemic ====
Due to the rapid spread of the coronavirus pandemic, the International Olympic Committee (IOC) and Tokyo Organising Committee elected to postpone the 2020 Summer Olympics to 2021. This additionally postponed the 2020 U.S. Olympic Trials to June of the following year, effectively cancelling the rest of the 2020 long course season.

=== 2021 ===
==== 2020 U.S. Olympic Trials ====
A year following the postponement of the Olympic Trials, Licon looked to redeem his third place finish from 5 years prior and make his first U.S. Olympic Team. Holding the top seed nationally in the 200 m breaststroke, he was a presumptive favorite to make the U.S. Olympic team in that event. Reminiscent to the same race in 2016 however, Licon finished in 3rd place again behind Nic Fink and Andrew Wilson, swimming a 2:08.50. Licon's time of 2:08.14 from 2016 would've made the Olympic Team in 2021. Licon also placed 6th in the 100 m breaststroke.

==== 2021 World Championships ====
2021 World Swimming Championships
Gold medal – first place	4×50 medley	1:30.51
Silver medal – second place	4×100 medley	3:20.50
Bronze medal – third place	200 m breaststroke	2:02.84

Resulting from his third place finish at the 2020 Olympic Trials, Licon was selected to compete at the 2021 Short Course World Swimming Championships in Abu Dhabi.

In the 200 m breaststroke prelims, he placed fourth overall to advance to the finals. In the finals, Licon won bronze with a time of 2:02.84 behind Nic Fink (2:02.28) and Arno Kamminga (2:02.42).

Licon competed in the preliminaries of the 4×50 m and the 4×100 m medley relays, tying for gold with the Russian Swimming Federation in 1:30.51, and grabbing silver behind Italy in 3:20.50 respectively.

== International Swimming League ==
On June 18, 2019, Licon announced his commitment to swim professionally for the LA Current in the newly-formed International Swimming League, which would be swum exclusively in short course meters.

=== 2019 season ===
In the inaugural ISL season and his ISL debut in Lewisville, Texas, as well as his debut in short course meters swimming, Licon competed in four events. On day 1, he finished sixth in the 50 m breaststroke and second in the 200 m breaststroke with a 2:04.33, just behind London Roar's Matthew Wilson (2:03.93) in the latter. In the 4×100-meter medley relay, Licon, alongside Olympians Ryan Murphy and Tom Shields, finished second to the London Roar while splitting a 57.32 on the breaststroke leg. On the second day, Licon finished fourth in the 100-meter breaststroke. Licon elected to opt out of the ISL match in Budapest to continue training stateside.

At the ISL American Derby in College Park, Maryland, Licon finished third in the 100 and 200-meter breaststrokes, going 57.33 and 2:04.09 respectively, which improved upon both of his times from the previous month. His 4×100 m medley relay was disqualified due to an exchange error between Licon and backstroker Shane Ryan.

At the ISL finale, hosted at the Mandalay Bay in Las Vegas, the Current entered as a dark horse to win the team title. Licon competed in the 50 breast next to long course world record-holder, Adam Peaty. Not known for his sprinting abilities, Licon got sixth place, but still managed to beat out sprint specialist Caeleb Dressel. In his next individual race, the 200 breaststroke, Licon was slated to swim his best event amongst a strong field that included short course world record-holder Kirill Prigoda, long course world record-holder Anton Chupkov, long course American record-holder Josh Prenot, former long course world record-holder Matthew Wilson, Ilya Shymanovich (second-fastest long course 100-meter breaststroker of all time behind Adam Peaty at the time), Andrew Wilson (eventual Olympic gold medalist), and Nic Fink (eventual Olympic qualifier in the 200 m breast and American record-holder in the 200 scm breast). Licon took the early lead, hitting the 100-meter mark almost 8-tenths of a second ahead of the next swimmer. On the last lap, Licon began to fatigue and Fink stormed down the last length to out-touch Licon for first. Licon's time of 2:02.42 was a new personal best and just 9-hundredths off the American record. Licon and his 4 × 100 medley relay got sixth place with Licon splitting a 56.64. The LA Current finished fourth place in the team standings.

=== 2020 season ===
Due to the COVID-19 pandemic, the entire 2020 season of the International Swimming League was staged in a bio-secure bubble in Budapest, Hungary at the Danube Arena from October 16 – November 22, 2020. All athletes and personnel stayed at three separate hotels on Margaret Island for the duration of the season.

In match 1 of the 2020 season, Licon got 2nd in the 200-meter breast in 2:04.28 to Marco Koch of the New York Breakers. He earned his first win of the season in the 4×100-meter medley relay alongside Ryan Murphy, Tom Shields, and Maxime Rooney. In match 3, Licon got 4th in the 200 breast (2:03.96), 6th in the 50 breast (26.88), and 6th in the 100 breast (58.00). In match 5, Licon got his first individual win of his ISL career over London Roar's Kirill Prigoda in 2:03.92. In the LA Current's last regular-season match, Licon earned another win in the 200 breast in 2:04.12.

During the ISL's second semifinal from November 15 – 16, Licon earned his third victory in a row in the 200 breaststroke, going 2:02.47 to out-touch Toronto's Anton Mckee. In the 100 breaststroke, he earned second place behind Team Iron's Emre Sakçı, going a personal best time of 57.07. The LA Current placed second behind the Cali Condors and ahead of Toronto and Iron, thus advancing themselves to the final match.

At the 2020 ISL Grand Finale, Licon swam the 50, 100, and 200 breaststroke races, as well as the B relay of the LA Current's 4×100 medley. In the 200 breast, Licon placed 3rd in 2:02.27 behind Prigoda and Fink. With the London Roar winning the men's 4×100 medley relay, they elected to swim the men's skins race in breaststroke. In his first skins race, Licon swam a personal-best time in 26.61, despite finishing in 8th place. The LA Current finished fourth overall in the finals for the second consecutive year.

== Education and personal life ==
Licon attended the University of Texas at Austin from 2013–2018 and graduated with a bachelor's degree in sport management and a minor in business. During his career at UT, Licon was a member of Big 12 Commissioner's Honor Roll (Fall 2013), 2-time Athletic Director's Honor Roll (2015, 2017), 2013–14 Academic All-Big 12 Rookie Team, 2015 Academic All-Big 12 (First Team), 2016 Academic All-Big 12 (First Team), and 2017 Academic All-Big 12 (Second Team). In 2017, Licon was selected by the University of Texas to be featured on the "Big 12 Champions for Life" campaign. The recipients, consisting of student athletes, express how their opportunity to earn a scholarship and compete in their chosen sport embodies the defining characteristics of a champion.

From 2016–2018, Licon was a member of the Texas Cowboys student organization at the University of Texas. In 2017, Licon was inducted into the Friar Society, which is the "oldest and most prestigious" honor society at the University of Texas.

== Personal bests ==
As of January 30, 2021

Long course
Event	Time	Meet	Date	Note(s)
100 m breaststroke	1:00.30	2016 U.S. Olympic Trials	June 26, 2016	(Semi-finals)
200 m breaststroke	2:07.62	2019 Pan American Games	August 8, 2019	GR
200 m IM	1:58.43	2015 Phillips 66 Summer National Championships	August 6, 2015	

Short course
Event	Time	Meet	Date	Note(s)
50 m breaststroke	26.61	2020 International Swimming League Finale – Men's Skins	November 22, 2020	
100 m breaststroke	57.07	2020 International Swimming League Semifinal 2	November 16, 2020	
200 m breaststroke	2:02.27	2020 International Swimming League Finale	November 21, 2020	
100 m IM	52.85	2020 International Swimming League Match 5	October 31, 2020	

Short course yards
Event	Time	Meet	Date	Note(s)
100 y breaststroke	50.68	2017 NCAA Championships	March 24, 2017	Former Big 12 Conference record, University of Texas school record
200 y breaststroke	1:47.91	2017 NCAA Championships	March 25, 2017	American record
200 y IM	1:40.04	2016 NCAA Championships	March 24, 2016	Former Big 12 Conference and University of Texas school record
400 y IM	3:36.37	2015 NCAA Championships	March 27, 2015	Former Big 12 Conference and University of Texas school record

== National records ==
=== National/U.S. Open records: Short course yards ===
No.	Event	Time	Meet	Date
1	4×100 y medley	3:01.23	2015 NCAA Championships	March 26, 2015
2	4×100 y medley (2)	3:00.68	2016 NCAA Championships	March 24, 2016
3	200 y breaststroke	1:48.12	2016 NCAA Championships	March 26, 2016
4	4×100 y medley (3)	2:59.22	2017 NCAA Championships	March 23, 2017
5	4×50 y medley	1:21.54	2017 NCAA Championships	March 24, 2017
6	200 y breaststroke (2)	1:47.91	2017 NCAA Championships	March 25, 2017

== See also ==
- NCAA Division I Men's Swimming and Diving Championships
- List of United States records in swimming
- List of University of Texas at Austin alumni
- Texas Longhorns swimming and diving
- Texas Longhorns
- Texas Cowboys
