= Northside Swim Center =

Swimming pool complex

- Interactive map of Northside Swim Center
- Address: San Antonio, Texas, United States,
- Coordinates: 29.564589°N 98.653438°W
- Capacity: 2,400
- Pool size: Competition pool: 25 m × 50 m (82 ft × 164 ft)

Construction
- Opened: 2013

Northside Swim Center is a swimming pool complex located in San Antonio, Texas, United States. The center opened in 2013 and serves the local community as well as hosting larger, national, and international scale events. In addition to outdoor swimming and diving facilities, the complex includes indoor swimming facilities in the Northside Independent School District (NISD) Natatorium.

== Outdoor facilities ==
Northside Swim Center was built around the pre-existing Northside Independent School District (NISD) Natatorium, which is an indoor facility, and opened in 2013. Funding for outdoor facilities came from a school bond passed in 2008. An Olympic-sized swimming pool, 50-meters long and 25-meters wide, is flanked by covered seating areas running parallel to the lengths of the pool. Automated electronic timing systems are wired to a large jumbotron-style screen to make timed results viewable during events. Behind the seating area on one side of the competition pool is a 25-metre long diving well equipped for springboard and platform diving and used for some swimming competitions as a warm-up and cool-down pool. Locker rooms have a 1,200 athlete capacity. Outdoor and natatorium facilities occupy 202,000 square feet.

== NISD Natatorium ==
The NISD Natatorium preceded the Northside Swim Center outdoor facilities, opening to the public in 2006 and was funded by a local school bond. The Natatorium was later incorporated into the Northside Swim Center when the center opened in 2013, though it retains the name NISD Natatorium. A 50-meter long, 25-yard wide pool is housed indoors and does not accommodate diving activities, neither springboard nor platform diving, as the pool ranges from four to seven feet deep.

== Records ==
The following records were set at Northside Swim Center.

Sport	Event	Format	Date	Time/Score	Record	Name	Nationality	Competition	Ref
Swimming	100 meter breaststroke (women's)	long course	March 31, 2022	1:05.96	German record	Anna Elendt	German	2022 TYR Pro Swim Series	
Swimming	100 meter breaststroke (women's)	long course	March 31, 2022	1:05.58	German record	Anna Elendt	German	2022 TYR Pro Swim Series	
Swimming	200 meter breaststroke (women's)	long course	April 1, 2022	2:24.63	German record	Anna Elendt	German	2022 TYR Pro Swim Series	
Swimming	200 meter individual medley (men's)	long course	April 2, 2022	1:56.95	French record	Léon Marchand	French	2022 TYR Pro Swim Series	

== Notable events ==
- 2013 AAU Diving National Championships
- 2014 USA Swimming Southern Zone Age Group Championships
- 2015 U.S. Masters Swimming Spring (Short Course) National Championships
- 2015 World Deaf Swimming Championships
- 2015 USA Swimming Championships
- 2015 USA Swimming Junior National Swimming Championships
- 2016 US Olympic Swim Team training camp
- 2019 USA Water Polo Welcome to Texas Shootout
- 2021 USA Water Polo Welcome to Texas Shootout
- 2022 TYR Pro Swim Series – San Antonio
- 2022 U.S. Masters Swimming Spring National Championships
- 2022 USA Water Polo Welcome to Texas Shootout
