= Joseph Schooling =

Singaporean swimmer (born 1995)

Joseph Schooling PJG
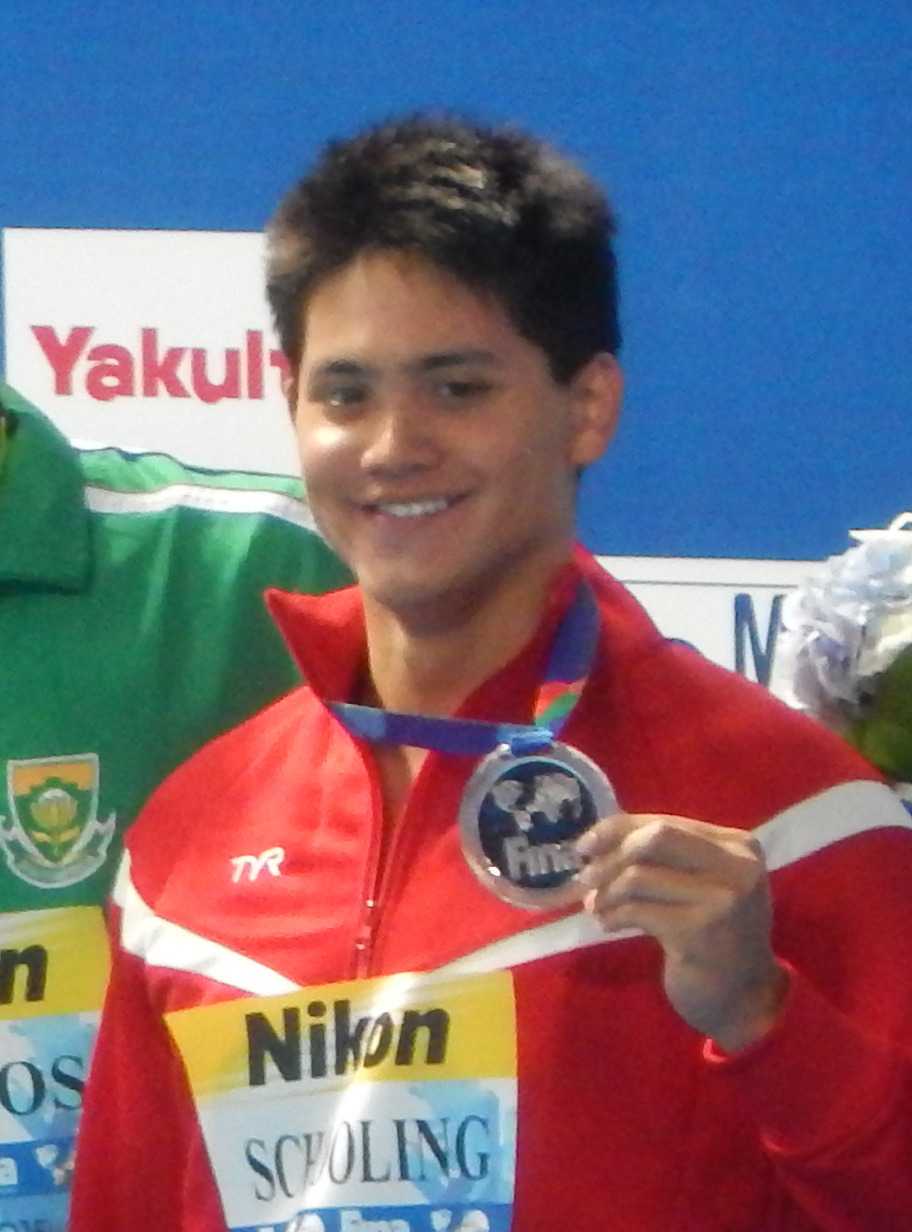
- Schooling at the 2015 World Championships

Personal information
- Full name: Joseph Isaac Schooling
- Nickname: "Singapore's Flying Fish"
- Born: 16 June 1995 (age 31) Singapore
- Height: 1.84 m (6 ft 0 in)
- Weight: 80 kg (180 lb)

Sport
- Sport: Swimming
- Strokes: Butterfly, Freestyle, Medley
- College team: University of Texas, Austin
- Coach: Sergio López Miró; Gary Tan; Eddie Reese, Kris Kubik (University of Texas)
Medal record
Men's swimming
Representing Singapore
Event	1st	2nd	3rd
Olympic Games	1	0	0
World Championships (LC)	0	0	2
Asian Games	3	1	3
Commonwealth Games	0	1	0
Southeast Asian Games	29	3	2
Total	33	5	7
Olympic Games
Gold medal – first place	2016 Rio de Janeiro	100 m butterfly
World Championships (LC)
Bronze medal – third place	2017 Budapest	100 m butterfly
Bronze medal – third place	2015 Kazan	100 m butterfly
Asian Games
Gold medal – first place	2018 Jakarta	100 m butterfly
Gold medal – first place	2018 Jakarta	50 m butterfly
Gold medal – first place	2014 Incheon	100 m butterfly
Silver medal – second place	2014 Incheon	50 m butterfly
Bronze medal – third place	2018 Jakarta	4×100 m freestyle
Bronze medal – third place	2018 Jakarta	4×200 m freestyle
Bronze medal – third place	2014 Incheon	200 m butterfly
Commonwealth Games
Silver medal – second place	2014 Glasgow	100 m butterfly
Southeast Asian Games
Gold medal – first place	2021 Hanoi	100 m butterfly
Gold medal – first place	2021 Hanoi	4×100 m medley
Gold medal – first place	2019 Philippines	100 m butterfly
Gold medal – first place	2019 Philippines	4×100 m freestyle
Gold medal – first place	2019 Philippines	4×200 m freestyle
Gold medal – first place	2019 Philippines	4×100 m medley
Gold medal – first place	2017 Kuala Lumpur	50 m butterfly
Gold medal – first place	2017 Kuala Lumpur	100 m butterfly
Gold medal – first place	2017 Kuala Lumpur	100 m freestyle
Gold medal – first place	2017 Kuala Lumpur	4×100 m freestyle
Gold medal – first place	2017 Kuala Lumpur	4×200 m freestyle
Gold medal – first place	2017 Kuala Lumpur	4×100 m medley
Gold medal – first place	2015 Singapore	50 m butterfly
Gold medal – first place	2015 Singapore	100 m butterfly
Gold medal – first place	2015 Singapore	200 m butterfly
Gold medal – first place	2015 Singapore	50 m freestyle
Gold medal – first place	2015 Singapore	100 m freestyle
Gold medal – first place	2015 Singapore	200 m medley
Gold medal – first place	2015 Singapore	4×100 m medley
Gold medal – first place	2015 Singapore	4×100 m freestyle
Gold medal – first place	2015 Singapore	4×200 m freestyle
Gold medal – first place	2013 Naypyidaw	100 m butterfly
Gold medal – first place	2013 Naypyidaw	200 m butterfly
Gold medal – first place	2013 Naypyidaw	200 m medley
Gold medal – first place	2013 Naypyidaw	4×100 m freestyle
Gold medal – first place	2013 Naypyidaw	4×100 m medley
Gold medal – first place	2013 Naypyidaw	4×200 m freestyle
Gold medal – first place	2011 Palembang	50 m butterfly
Gold medal – first place	2011 Palembang	200 m butterfly
Silver medal – second place	2019 Philippines	50 m butterfly
Silver medal – second place	2019 Philippines	100 m freestyle
Silver medal – second place	2011 Palembang	200 m medley
Bronze medal – third place	2021 Hanoi	4x200 m freestyle
Bronze medal – third place	2011 Palembang	100 m butterfly
Representing the Texas Longhorns
Event	1st	2nd	3rd
NCAA Championships	12	2	3
Total	12	2	3
By race
Event	1st	2nd	3rd
50 y freestyle	0	0	1
100 y butterfly	2	1	0
200 y butterfly	2	0	0
4×50 y freestyle	2	0	0
4×100 y freestyle	1	1	0
4×200 y freestyle	1	0	0
4×50 y medley	1	0	2
4×100 y medley	3	0	0
Total	12	2	3
NCAA Championships
Gold medal – first place	2015 Iowa City	100 y butterfly
Gold medal – first place	2015 Iowa City	200 y butterfly
Gold medal – first place	2015 Iowa City	4x100 y medley
Gold medal – first place	2016 Atlanta	100 y butterfly
Gold medal – first place	2016 Atlanta	200 y butterfly
Gold medal – first place	2016 Atlanta	4x50 y freestyle
Gold medal – first place	2016 Atlanta	4x200 y freestyle
Gold medal – first place	2016 Atlanta	4x100 y medley
Gold medal – first place	2017 Indianapolis	4x50 y freestyle
Gold medal – first place	2017 Indianapolis	4x100 y freestyle
Gold medal – first place	2017 Indianapolis	4x50 y medley
Gold medal – first place	2017 Indianapolis	4x100 y medley
Silver medal – second place	2016 Atlanta	4×100 y freestyle
Silver medal – second place	2017 Indianapolis	100 y butterfly
Bronze medal – third place	2015 Iowa City	4×50 y medley
Bronze medal – third place	2016 Atlanta	4×50 y medley
Bronze medal – third place	2017 Indianapolis	50 y freestyle

Joseph Isaac Schooling PJG (born 16 June 1995) is a Singaporean former professional swimmer who specialised in butterfly, freestyle, and medley events. He was the gold medalist in the 100m butterfly at the 2016 Olympics, achieving Singapore's first ever Olympic gold medal. His winning time of 50.39s broke multiple records at the National, Southeast Asian, Asian, and Olympic levels.

An alumnus of the Anglo-Chinese School, he subsequently graduated from the University of Texas at Austin, where he was a member of the Texas Longhorns swimming team, one of the top collegiate swim programmes under two-time United States Olympic men's head coach Eddie Reese. He first qualified for the Olympics in 2012 after winning the 200m butterfly at the 2011 SEA Games.

On 2 April 2024, he announced his retirement from competitive swimming to focus on his swim school and other business ventures.

== Early life and family ==
Schooling was born and raised in Singapore, being a fourth-generation Singaporean. He is the only child of May and Colin Schooling, and has Eurasian ancestry through his father. May was previously from Perak and had moved to Singapore to become a permanent resident, having also played professionally in tennis; while Colin, a businessman born in Singapore and educated at Raffles Institution, was a hurdler and water polo player who represented Singapore in softball.

His grand-uncle was Lloyd Valberg, who took part in the 1948 Summer Olympics as Singapore's first Olympian. He was the one who inspired Schooling to participate in the Olympic Games. Schooling's great-grandfather was a British military officer who married a Portuguese-Eurasian in Singapore.

Schooling's early years of education were spent at the Anglo-Chinese School (Junior) at Newton. He next attended Anglo-Chinese School (Independent) at Dover, before attending the Bolles School in 2009 at Jacksonville, Florida, United States. In 2010, Schooling started training under Sergio López Miró, who later on in 2015 would become Singapore's national head coach. In 2014, after completing high school, he enrolled at the University of Texas at Austin where he swam for Hall of Fame Coaches Eddie Reese and Associate Coach Kris Kubik.

Colin Schooling died on 18 November 2021, aged 73. He had been undergoing treatment for cancer since June of that year.

== Collegiate career ==
=== 2015 NCAA ===
Schooling won two individual titles (100 & 200-yard butterfly) at the 2015 NCAA Division I Men's Swimming and Diving Championships. His other title came from the 400-yard medley relay. He teamed up with Kip Darmody, Will Licon, and Jack Conger to break the NCAA and US Open records. In the 200-yard medley relay, he was a member of the Texas team that finished third. Schooling also swam in the 200-yard medley consolation final (finishing first) and the 400-yard freestyle relay where Texas finished fourth.

=== 2016 NCAA ===
Schooling successfully defended his butterfly titles, setting both NCAA and US open records of 44.01 in the 100-yard butterfly and 1:37.97 in the 200-yard butterfly at the 2016 NCAA Division I Men's Swimming and Diving Championships. He also won golds as a member of the 200 and 800-yard freestyle relays and the 400-yard medley relay. His silver came from the 400-yard freestyle relay and bronze from the 200-yard medley relay.

=== 2017 NCAA ===
Schooling obtained four gold medals, a silver, and a bronze medal at the 2017 NCAA Division I Men's Swimming and Diving Championships. His gold medals came from the 200 and 400-yard medley relays and the 200 and 400-yard freestyle relays. Texas set new NCAA and US open records in all of the relays he was involved except for the 200-yard medley relay.

Schooling started off his individual campaign with a bronze in the 50-yard freestyle in 18.79 behind Caeleb Dressel and Ryan Held. He was unable to defend his butterfly titles, finishing behind Dressel in the 100-yard butterfly in 43.75 (2nd man fastest all-time). In the 200-yard butterfly, he failed to make the finals, finishing 37th overall.

Schooling ended his collegiate career at the University of Texas with 12 NCAA titles (4 individuals & 8 relays).

== International career ==
In the early part of his career, Schooling was trained by coaches and swimmers of Australia under the monitoring of Monash University in a Singapore Sports Council programme.

At the 2011 Southeast Asian Games, Schooling's 1:56.67 winning time in the 200 fly met the "A" qualifying mark for the 2012 London Olympics. Unfortunately, he did not qualify for the semi-finals after finishing poorly in his heats where swimming officials disallowed the use of his swimming cap and goggles, causing him to have to search for new ones just minutes before the competition, affecting his state of mind.

Schooling is the first Singaporean to win a swimming medal at the Commonwealth Games, taking silver in the 100 m butterfly at the 2014 games in Glasgow.

=== 2014 Asian Games ===
Schooling's major breakthrough finally came during the Asian Games, where he clocked 51.76 seconds in the 100 m butterfly finals. Schooling's timing of 51.76 seconds was a new Asian Games record. It was Singapore's first Asian Games gold in the men's category since 1982. Schooling had earlier won a bronze for the 200 m butterfly event, ending a 24-year medal drought for Singapore's male swimming event. He followed that by winning a silver in the 50 m butterfly event.

=== 2015 SEA Games ===
At the 2015 SEA Games held in Singapore, Schooling took part in nine events, achieving gold and breaking Games records in all of them. Schooling's time of 22.47 seconds in the 50 m freestyle broke a 33-year national record (22.69 s) that was held by Ang Peng Siong, who had set it at the 1982 U.S. Swimming Championships.

=== 2015 FINA World Championships ===
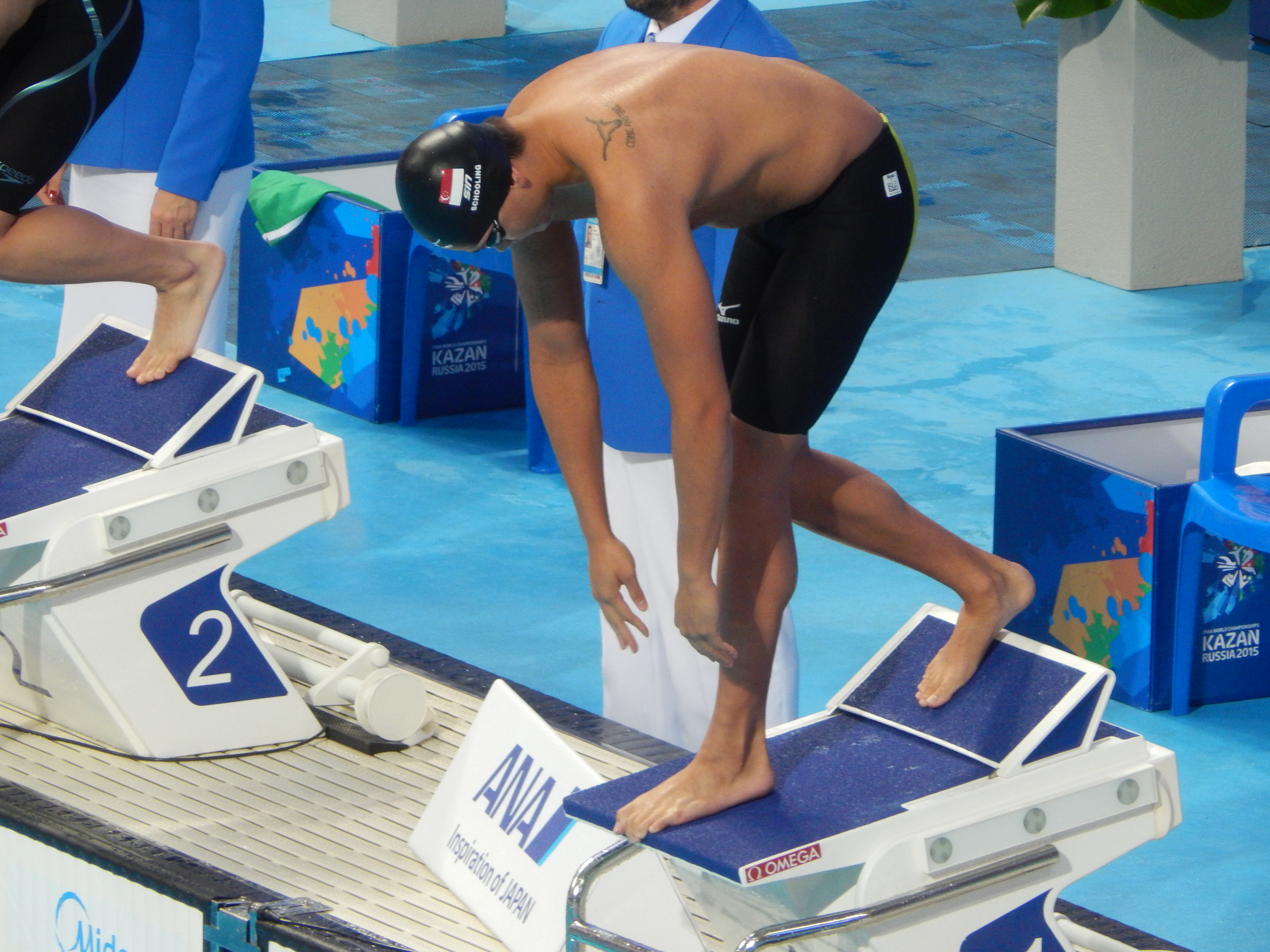
Kazan 2015 - Schooling 100m butterfly

Schooling continued with his streak of achievements in the 2015 World Aquatics Championships. He advanced to the 50 m and 100 m butterfly finals, breaking the National Records for both events. In the 50 m butterfly event, he broke the Asian Record in the semi-finals before breaking it again in the finals with a time of 23.25 seconds, while in the 100 m butterfly event, he broke the Asian Record in the finals, with a time of 50.96 seconds. His bronze medal was Singapore's first ever medal at the FINA World Aquatics Championships.

=== 2016 Olympics ===
On 12 August 2016, in Rio de Janeiro, Schooling won a gold medal in the 100 m butterfly with a time of 50.39 seconds, the first Olympic gold medal won by Singapore. The time set a new Olympic record, beating Phelps' record of 50.58 seconds at the 2008 Summer Olympics.

In the semi-finals on 11 August 2016, Schooling swam 50.83 seconds as the fastest qualifier for the final. The time was a personal best, a national record, an Asian record, and the fastest time then-recorded in 2016 for the event, but only for a day as Schooling improved his time in the final.

The Singapore National Olympic Council awarded Schooling S$1 million (about US$740,000) under the Multi-Million Dollar Award Programme (MAP), 20% of which had to be ploughed back to the Singapore Swimming Association for future training and development. Singapore's unique "rewards for sports excellence" is deemed to be the world's largest Olympic cash prize. As a University of Texas collegiate swimmer, Schooling was subject to the NCAA's strict rules against college athletes accepting prize money. However, Schooling received his country's award as it fell within the NCAA exception of awards to foreign students.

To mark Schooling's historic gold medal, a victory parade was held in Singapore.

Schooling's performance in Rio was listed in swimming magazine Swim Swam's Top 10 Swims Of 2016. He came in at No. 4, after Hungarian Katinka Hosszú (400 IM, Rio Olympics), American Katie Ledecky (800 m freestyle, Rio Olympics), and Briton Adam Peaty (100 m breaststroke, Rio Olympics).

=== 2017 FINA World Championships ===
Schooling swam 3 events (50 m, 100 m butterfly and 100 m freestyle) in Budapest. He broke his own Asian record twice in the 50 m butterfly heats (23.05 sec) and semi-finals (22.93 sec). He clocked 22.95 sec in the finals to finish 5th. He missed out on 100 m freestyle semi-final after finishing 17th in the heats. In the 100m butterfly finals, Olympic Champion Schooling was the favourite to win the event but Caeleb Dressel was too dominant from the heats to the finals. Dressel clocked 49.86 sec in the final to eclipse Schooling's world textile best time of 50.39 sec, set in Rio Olympics. Caeleb's time was 0.04 sec shy of Michael Phelps supersuit World Record. Schooling obtained a joint-Bronze medal with Briton James Guy with a time of 50.83 sec.

=== 2017 SEA Games ===
Schooling swam six events at the 29th SEA Games held in Kuala Lumpur, Malaysia. He won all his events and broke four South-east Asian records (50 m, 100 m butterfly, 4 × 100 m freestyle relay & 4 × 100 m medley relay).

=== 2018 Asian Games ===
Schooling participated in 3 individual events (50 m freestyle, 50 m, and 100 m butterfly) and 3 relays (4 × 100 m freestyle, 4 × 200 m freestyle & 4 × 100 m medley). He successfully defended his 100 m butterfly Gold with a new Asian Games record of 51.04 seconds. He later won Singapore's second Gold in the 50 m butterfly. He also contributed to the bronze medal winning relays (4 × 100 m freestyle & 4 × 200 m freestyle) and was 4th in 4 × 100 m medley relay. Both the 4 × 100 m and 4 × 200 m freestyle relays set a new national record.

=== 2019 FINA World Championships ===
Schooling swam 3 events (50 m, 100 m butterfly and 4×100 m freestyle relay) in Gwangju. He did not qualify for the semi-finals for all his events.

=== 2019 SEA Games ===
Schooling swam six events at the 30th SEA Games held in the Philippines. He obtained four gold and two silver medals. He lost the 50 m butterfly to Teong Tzen Wei and the 100m freestyle to Darren Chua.

=== 2020 Olympics ===
Schooling did not defend his 100m butterfly title at the 2020 Tokyo Olympics after failing to qualify for the semi-finals, finishing 8th in his heat. He placed 44th overall with a time of 53.12 seconds. Schooling also failed to qualify for the 100m freestyle semi-finals after finishing 6th in his Heat and 39th overall with a time of 49.84 seconds.

Despite Schooling's results at the Tokyo Olympics, there were a lot of support among Singaporeans for his effort. President Halimah Yacob also made a public statement to show her support for the athletes.

=== 2021 SEA Games ===
Schooling competed in his first SEA Games since enlisting for mandatory National Service in Singapore at the 31st SEA Games held in Hanoi, Vietnam. The Singapore Men's team for the 4x100m freestyle relay, comprising Mikkel Lee, Jonathan Tan, Schooling, and Quah Zheng Wen, was disqualified for an early take-off from one of the swimmers, after coming first in the race, thereby stripping Schooling of his first gold medal of the Games. Schooling however went on to win two golds and a bronze medal in the 100m butterfly, 4x100m medley, and the 4x200m freestyle relay respectively. Schooling remains unbeaten in the 100m butterfly since the 2013 SEA Games, winning his fifth consecutive gold medal in the event.

=== 2022 Asian Games ===
Schooling was excluded from the final list of athletes set to represent Singapore at the 2022 Asian Games in Hangzhou, China (delayed due to the COVID-19 pandemic). In response to media queries, Singapore Aquatics mentioned that selection for the Asian Games was based on swimmers clocking the fastest times during the qualification window and that two other swimmers clocked faster times than Schooling. Singapore failed to win any gold medals in swimming at the 2022 Asian Games.

=== 2023 SEA Games ===
Schooling withdrew from participating in the 2023 SEA Games held in Phnom Penh, Cambodia. He explained that, "I am currently not at the level at which I hold myself to perform. Ultimately, my country comes first before individual accolades." Singapore retained both gold medals won by Schooling in the 100m butterfly and the 4x100m medley at the 2021 SEA Games.

On 20 August 2023, responding to media queries on his omission from the 2022 Asian Games, Schooling remarked that it was "definitely was a bummer", adding that he was still undecided about his future.

== Personal life ==
In August 2016, Schooling had his National Service (NS) deferred until after the 2020 Summer Olympics in Tokyo. The Armed Forces Council had approved Schooling's request to extend his deferment, as he had been exemplary in fulfilling the "raison d'être" for his deferment from 2013 to the 2016 Summer Olympics. Minister for Defence Ng Eng Hen had said then that NS deferment "may be granted in exceptional circumstances to individual sportsmen, who are assessed to be potential medal winners at international competitions like the Olympic Games and bring national pride for the country."

On 27 June 2018, Schooling launched his swimming school called Swim Schooling. The school is managed by his mother, May Schooling.

In 2020, Schooling and fellow national swimmer Quah Zheng Wen applied to further extend their National Service deferment, given the postponement of the 2020 Tokyo Olympics due to the COVID-19 pandemic. Following Schooling and Quah's performance in the Tokyo Olympics, netizens quipped that both, who had been granted full-time National Service deferments, should now go, "From Tokyo to Tekong", citing the island where new recruits are trained. Schooling began serving National Service on 3 January 2022. However, he was allowed short-term disruptions during his service when he had to train and compete. This privilege was rescinded when it was reported on 30 August 2022 that Schooling had taken cannabis when he was overseas training for and participating in the 2021 Southeast Asian Games.

In September 2024, Schooling joined Vertex Holdings as an associate. During the 2025 Singaporean general election, Schooling was seen with People's Action Party candidates Edwin Tong, Jessica Tan, and the new candidates Dinesh Vasu Dash and Hazlina Abdul Halim at nomination centre at Yusof Ishak Secondary School for East Coast GRC on 26 April 2025.

== Honours and awards ==
- Meritorious Service Medal (2016)

In October 2016, Schooling received the Pingat Jasa Gemilang (Meritorious Service Medal) for his exceptional achievements at the 2016 Summer Olympics by winning Singapore's first ever Olympic gold medal in the men's 100m butterfly.

On 7 August 2017, an Orchid was named after Schooling; Dendrobium Joseph Schooling is a "vigorous and free flowering" hybrid with yellow and slightly twisted petals.

Schooling has also received the following awards:

- The Straits Times Singaporean of the Year, 2016
- The Straits Times Athlete of the Year (2014, 2016)
- Sportsman of the Year (2012, 2015, 2016, 2017, 2018, 2019)

== See also ==
- List of Singapore world champions in sports
