= Kris Kubik =

American swimmer & coach (born c.1955)

- Kubik as a High School Junior in 1972

Biographical details
- Born: circa 1955; Memphis, Tennessee, U.S.
- Education: North Carolina State; Auburn University '78

Playing career
- 1973-1978: North Carolina State; Auburn University
- Position: backstroke

Coaching career (HC unless noted)
- 1977-1978: Auburn University; Student Asst. Coach
- 1979-1981: University of Texas; Assoc. Coach w/Eddie Reese
- 1981-1986: Nashville Aquatics Club; Longhorn Aquatics Club
- 1986-2016: University of Texas; Assoc. Coach w/Eddie Reese
- 2007: Pan American Games; Asst. Coach
- 2008: U.S. Olympic Team, Beijing; Special Asst.

Accomplishments and honors

Championships
- 12 NCAA National Team Championships; 1981, 1988-91, 1996, 2000-2002; 2010, 2015, 2016 (University of Texas) 33 Conference Championships (University of Texas)

Kris Kubik (born c. 1955) was an All-American competitive swimmer for North Carolina State, Auburn University and the Associate Head swimming coach for the University of Texas under Head Coach Eddie Reese. In his thirty-four year tenure coaching swimming at the University of Texas at Austin from 1979 to 1981, and 1986 through 2016, he helped lead the Longhorns to 12 NCAA National team Championships, claiming titles in successive years for the 1989–91, 2000–02, and 2015–2016 seasons.

Kubik was born mid-1955 in Memphis, Tennessee to Dr. Burdette Kubik, a Dentist, and former coach, who moved to Memphis in 1948, and Mrs. Zelma Kubik an English teacher at Memphis State. The couple married in 1941, when Dr. Kubik was in Dental School at St. Louis University. By three, Kris was active in Cub Scouting, where his father served as a scoutmaster. He grew up the youngest of four siblings in a swimming family, and was active in competitive swimming by the age of seven, first learning to swim at a Red Cross swimming program. As serious age-group competitors who performed strength training and practiced twice daily, by high school he and each of his siblings were on at least one state swimming championship team and garnered many first-place finishes.

== Early swimming achievements ==
Excelling early, at the age of only eight in April, 1964, Kris broke the Southeastern AAU age group record for boys eight and under in the 25-yard butterfly with a time of 15.6, and tied the age group record for the 25-yard freestyle with a time of :14.9.

In 1966, in an International competition with Canadian swimmers in Ontario, Canada, Kris took two gold medals, winning the 10-and-under 50-yard butterfly while setting a Canadian Open age group record with a time of 30.8. Kris was also on the winning 200-yard medley relay team. In 1966, at the age of 10, Kris had earlier recorded the second best American time in his age-group for the 50-yard butterfly with a 31.3, qualifying him for the Canadian meet.

=== High school highlights ===
Kris attended and swam for the Memphis White Station High School Spartans under Coach Larry Heathcott where he graduated around 1973. By his Junior year, at 16, he held two Southeastern AAU records, and would compete in the city's Interscholastic Athletic Associations' swimming title in the 100-yard butterfly, 200-yard freestyle, and 200 Medley Relay. In highly competitive age group swimming, from an early age he also swam under Coach Dick Fadgen for the Memphis Athletic Club team founded in 1956, and later the Memphis State Swim Club Team, which practiced at the Memphis State University campus. Dick Fadgen, Kris's primary High School Coach, would produce seven state championship swim teams with the Memphis Athletic Club and coach Memphis State University beginning in 1972.

=== '72 Olympic Trials ===
Kris had hopes of qualifying for the 1972 Olympic swimming trials, and at a high point in his high school swimming career at seventeen, he qualified by swimming a 1:02.3 in the 100-meter backstroke at a meet in Cincinnati. Three other Memphis State Swim Club participants made the trials with him. Kubik competed in the trials in early August in Chicago but did not make the U.S. team, as his preliminary time of 1:03.55 was around 3.3 seconds short of qualifying in the highly competitive trials. In 1972, he also qualified for the AAU National Meet in Louisville, Kentucky while swimming for the Memphis State Swim Club and recorded a qualifying time of :54.6 in the 100-yard backstroke.

== College swimming ==
Kris was an All-American swimmer for North Carolina State, where he swam under Head Coach Don Easterling. In 1974, Kubik swam a conference record 1:57.07 in the 200-yard backstroke, breaking his own record by a second, and helping to lead North Carolina to its fifth straight victory in the Atlantic Coast Conference's swimming title. By February 1975, while at North Carolina State, Kubik held Atlantic Coast Conference records in the 100-yard backstroke of 51.98, and in the 200-yard backstroke of 1:55.30. North Carolina State dominated the conference records with Kubik's teammate Steve Gregg holding records in three events.

He transferred from North Carolina State to Auburn University where he graduated in 1978, and swam under Hall of Fame Coach Eddie Reese, with whom he would also serve as a student coach through the 1979 season. Kubik would later have a long career as Associate coach when he would leave Auburn to follow Reese to the University of Texas.

== Coaching ==
Kubik was Associate Head coach for the University of Texas under Head Coach Eddie Reese, from 1979 to 1981, and from 1986 through 2016.

Kubik left University coaching and academics for four years, where from 1981 to 1983, he was an age group coach for the Longhorn Aquatics Club, a high achieving age group swim club. After two Assistant Coaches left, from around 1983-1985 he filled in as an Assistant Coach for the Nashville Aquatic Club, a quality program with 220 members. In Nashville, one of his outstanding swimmers, Jennifer Lowe, was a backstroker hoping to qualify for the 1984 Olympic Trials. Kubik specialized in the younger swimmers in Nashville, and sixteen of the group had competed in the junior national championships.

== University of Texas, Austin ==
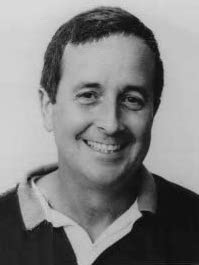
Eddie Reese, 1988

With the two of them working together well, Kubik coached a total of 34 seasons with Eddie Reese as Head Coach and won 12 NCAA National team championships. In Reese and Kubik's second year together, they led Texas to an NCAA runner-up finish at the 1980 NCAA Championships and gave Texas its first NCAA men's swimming team championship in 1981. The 1981 team featuring Scott Spann, Kris Kirchner, backstroker Clay Britt, and butterflier William Paulus remained at the top of their conference in 1981 and had the rare honor of leading the nation in college competition.

After Kubik returned to Texas after a stint with age-group coaching in the mid-80's, Kubik and Reese had four consecutive NCAA National Championships from 1988 to 1991, and won their sixth National Championship in 1996. They won consecutive titles from 2000 to 2002, won again in 2010, and took titles from 2015 to 2016. Benefitting from the press coverage and publicity brought to the university in 1989, their third NCAA championship while coaching together, Kubik received a 9% bonus in pay as did Reese.

During Kubik's tenure, Texas swimming had 26 NCAA finishes in the top-three and 32 NCAA showings in the top-five. Texas had a total of 54 NCAA individual titles and 42 NCAA relay titles during Kubik's tenure, and had 32 Olympians who captured a total of 36 gold, 16 silver and eight bronze medals. The team of Kubik and Reese took conference team titles in 33 of its 34 seasons working together.

In Kubik's final season in 2016, Texas had a perfect 10–0 record in dual meets, took its 37th consecutive conference title, recorded seven NCAA American records, and more significantly won their 12th NCAA National team title.

=== Outstanding swimmers ===
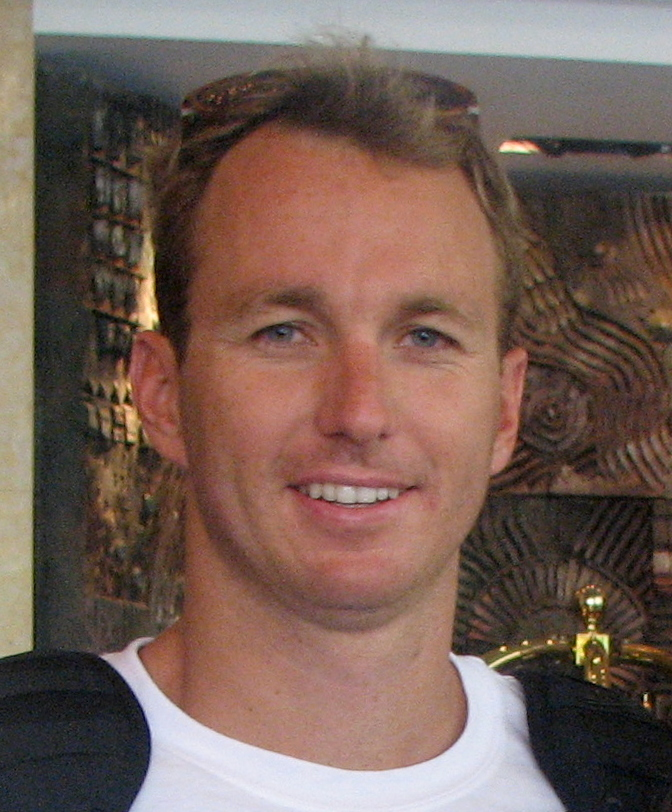
Aaron Peirsol

Four swimmers from the 2016 season, Townley Haas, Jack Conger, Clark Smith and Joseph Schooling, were expected to attend the 2016 Olympics in Rio de Janeiro, Brazil. Outstanding swimmers, mostly Olympians, coached by the team of Kubik and Reese included three-time Olympic gold medalist Ian Crocker, Rick Carey, three-time Olympic gold medalist Brendan Hansen, two-time Olympic gold medalist Neil Walker, three-time Olympic gold medalist Josh Davis, Olympic gold medal winner David Walters, Scott Spann, five time Olympic gold medalist Aaron Peirsol, and Will Licon.

=== International coaching ===
Kubik served as coach for several international teams. He was Asst. Coach for the U.S. team at the 2007 Pan American Games and served as a special assistant for the Coaching Staff of USA Swimming at the Beijing Olympics in 2008.

He was the Team USA Asst. Coach at the FINA World Championships in 2009 and the 2015 World University Games.

Kris was married to April Russell, David Russell's daughter. Russell was an outstanding defensive back on two University of Texas SEC Champion football squads from 1959 to 1961.

=== Honors ===
High accomplished as a grade school and high school athlete, in 1973 as a High School Senior at White Station High, Kubik received the local Commercial Appeal newspaper's "Best- of-the-Preps" trophy for the outstanding Memphis High School area athlete in the sport of swimming.

In 2011, Kubik was inducted into University of Texas's Athletics Men's Hall of Honor. A recipient of the organizations highest recognition for coaching achievement, Kubik was selected to receive the National Collegiate and Scholastic Trophy by the CSCAA in May, 2017. In a more exclusive honor, Kubik was more recently chosen as one of the 100 Greatest Swimming and Diving Coaches of the Century in 2021 by the College Swimming and Diving Coaches Association of America (CSCAA).
