= Scott Spann (surgeon) =

American orthopaedic surgeon (born 1958)

Scott Spann (born April 24, 1958) is an American orthopaedic surgeon, medical device inventor, former world-class swimmer and recovered quadriplegic.

== Medical career ==
Spann was born in Greenville, South Carolina. He is a practicing orthopaedic surgeon and fellowship-trained in the surgical treatment of the spine. He is the founder of Westlake Orthopaedics Spine and Sports in Austin, Texas. Spann attended the University of South Carolina Medical School where he served as President of the State Student Section of the American Medical Association, and then completed his residency with the Ochsner Foundation in New Orleans, Louisiana. While a resident, Spann enlisted in the United States Medical Corps, from which he later retired as a Major. After residency, he performed a fellowship in spine surgery in Atlanta, Georgia.

Spann eventually opened a private practice in Knoxville, Tennessee, and served as the Chairman of Orthopedics of east Tennessee's largest hospital system. Then Dr. Frank Noyes, American Orthopaedic Society for Sports Medicine Hall of Fame Inductee, recruited Spann to come to Cincinnati and begin the Spine Care Institute.

Finally, in 1997, Spann and his family returned to Austin, Texas, where Spann had earned his undergraduate degree and met and married his college sweetheart. There he founded Westlake Orthopaedics and helped to found Westlake Hospital.

In 2005 Spann began researching stem cells and their effectiveness in treating orthopaedic injuries. As a result, he became one of the earliest to adapt stem cells for use in a clinical setting. In April, 2010, an international biopharmaceutical company opened a stem cell harvesting center in Spann's Westlake office.

A member of numerous medical organizations, Spann is a Diplomate of the American Board of Orthopedic Surgery (certifying body of orthopedic surgeons in the United States) and Chairman of Spine Surgery at Westlake Hospital. He is also a consultant and instructor for several medical device companies, and has been a part of numerous product design teams for spinal implants, holding more than a dozen patents for orthopaedic products and procedures.

== Business career ==
Spann developed a company called Pantheon Spinal. Pantheon Spinal is a surgical device company dedicated to bringing innovation to the field of spine surgery. The Pantheon System Products are Spann's invention of intellectually-designed, rigorously tested and FDA-cleared devices called "Epiphany" and "Pontus."

The "Epiphany" device is specifically engineered for lateral access to L5-S1. It is designed for use in patients with advanced degenerative disc disease and intended for implantation via an oblique lateral lumbar exposure.

The "Pontus" device is designed to act as a bridge from the Epiphany device, to the remaining portion of the spine during surgery. It is engineered for implantation between the L2 and L5 vertebrae via a lumbar lateral exposure.

== Swimming career ==
Spann began swimming at the age of seven and was a championship swimmer during his undergraduate years at Auburn University and the University of Texas. During this time he broke five world records, including one of Mark Spitz', and was expected to qualify for the 1980 Olympics before the United States boycott of the Moscow games. An alumnus at the University of Texas, he was inducted into the UT Hall of Honor in 1998.

== Quadriplegia and recovery ==
In September 2005 Spann suffered a severe spinal cord injury, rendering him unable to move from the neck down. After a surgery that included an anterior and posterior fusion, an iliac bone graft and a Harm's Cage insertion, he underwent physical therapy, craniosacral therapy and myofascial release therapy. Then, in January 2006, Spann returned to the operating room as a surgical assistant. With time he returned to a full workload, including surgery.

== Personal ==
Spann lives in Austin, Texas. He has three children: Austin, Scott Jr., and Alexi.
