= David Walters (swimmer) =

American swimmer (born 1987)

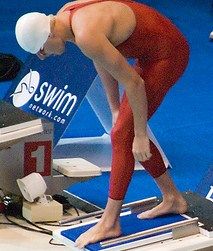

Personal information
- Nickname: Dave
- National team: United States
- Born: September 27, 1987 (age 39) Newport News, Virginia, U.S.
- Height: 6 ft 3 in (191 cm)
- Weight: 190 lb (86 kg)

Sport
- Sport: Swimming
- Strokes: Freestyle
- Club: Trojan Aquatics
- College team: University of Texas
- Coach: Eddie Reese, Kris Kubik (U. Texas)
Medal record
Men's swimming
Representing the United States
Olympic Games
Gold medal – first place	2008 Beijing	4×200 m freestyle
World Championships (LC)
Gold medal – first place	2007 Melbourne	4×200 m freestyle
Gold medal – first place	2009 Rome	4×200 m freestyle
Gold medal – first place	2009 Rome	4×100 m medley
Gold medal – first place	2011 Shanghai	4×200 m freestyle
Bronze medal – third place	2011 Shanghai	4×100 m freestyle
World Championships (SC)
Silver medal – second place	2010 Dubai	4×200 m freestyle

David Walters (born September 27, 1987), also known as Dave Walters, is an American former competition swimmer, Olympic gold medalist, and world record-holder in the 4x200 meter freestyler relay. At the 2008 Summer Olympics, Walters earned a gold medal by swimming in the heats of the 4×200-meter freestyle relay. As part of the American team, he also formerly held the world record in the 4×100-meter medley relay (long course). Walters is also a seven-time medalist (five gold, one silver, one bronze) at the World Aquatics Championships.

== Early years and education ==
Walters was born in Newport News, Virginia. He graduated from Tabb High School in Yorktown, Virginia, where he competed for the Tabb Tigers high school swim team. He received an athletic scholarship to attend the University of Texas in Austin, Texas, where he swam for Hall of Fame coach Eddie Reese and Kris Kubik's Texas Longhorns swimming and diving team in National Collegiate Athletic Association (NCAA) and Big 12 Conference competition from 2007 to 2010. He was a four-time Big 12 champion, a six-time All-American, and won the individual NCAA national championship in the 200-yard freestyle in 2008. At the conclusion of his 2009–10 senior year, the Longhorns won the NCAA national team championship.

== International competition ==
=== 2008 Summer Olympics ===
Walters swam the first leg of the 4×200meter freestyle relay preliminaries (in 1:46.57) with Ricky Berens, Erik Vendt, and Klete Keller. Their time of 7:04.66 broke the previous Olympic record of 7:07.05 set by Australia in 2000. In the final of the 4×200-meter freestyle relay, Michael Phelps, Ryan Lochte, Berens and Peter Vanderkaay swam a combined time of 6:58.56, a new world record.

=== 2009 World Championships ===
At the 2009 National Championships, Walters competed in three events. In his first event, the 200-meter freestyle, Walters placed second to Michael Phelps with a time of 1:44.95. In the 100-meter freestyle, Walters placed second to Nathan Adrian in a time of 48.17. In the 50-meter freestyle, Walters placed 15th in the heats with a time of 22.60.

At the 2009 World Aquatics Championships in Rome, Walters earned a gold medal as a member of the 4×200-meter freestyle relay. Walters, with Michael Phelps, Ricky Berens and Ryan Lochte, swam a combined time of 6:58.55 to break the world record set last year in Beijing. In the 100-meter freestyle final, Walters placed 5th with a time of 47.33 to break Michael Phelps' American record of 47.51. Walters placed 12th overall in the 200-meter freestyle and did not advance to the final. In the 4×100-meter medley relay final, Walters, with Aaron Peirsol, Michael Phelps, and Eric Shanteau, swam a combined time of 3:27.28 to break the world record set last year in Beijing.

== Post-swimming career ==
After not making the 2012 Olympic team, Walters retired from competitive swimming. He subsequently joined the Los Angeles Fire Department as a firefighter. For his service in the Palisades Fire, Walters was awarded the Pat Tillman Award for Service at the 2025 ESPY Awards.

== Personal bests ==
As of August 6, 2010.

Event	Time	Venue	Date	Note(s)
50 m freestyle (long course)	22.60	Indianapolis	July 9, 2009	
100 m freestyle (long course)	47.33	Rome	July 30, 2009	Former NR
200 m freestyle (long course)	1:44.95	Indianapolis	July 8, 2009	

Key: NR = National record

== See also ==
- List of Olympic medalists in swimming (men)
- List of University of Texas at Austin alumni
- List of World Aquatics Championships medalists in swimming (men)
- World record progression 4 × 100 metres medley relay
- World record progression 4 × 200 metres freestyle relay

Records
Preceded by Aaron Peirsol, Brendan Hansen, Michael Phelps, Jason Lezak	Men's 4×100-meter medley relay world record-holder (long course); August 2, 2009 – August 1, 2021; With: Aaron Peirsol, Eric Shanteau, Michael Phelps	Succeeded by Ryan Murphy, Michael Andrew, Caeleb Dressel, Zach Apple
