= Eddie Reese =

American swimming coach and college swimmer

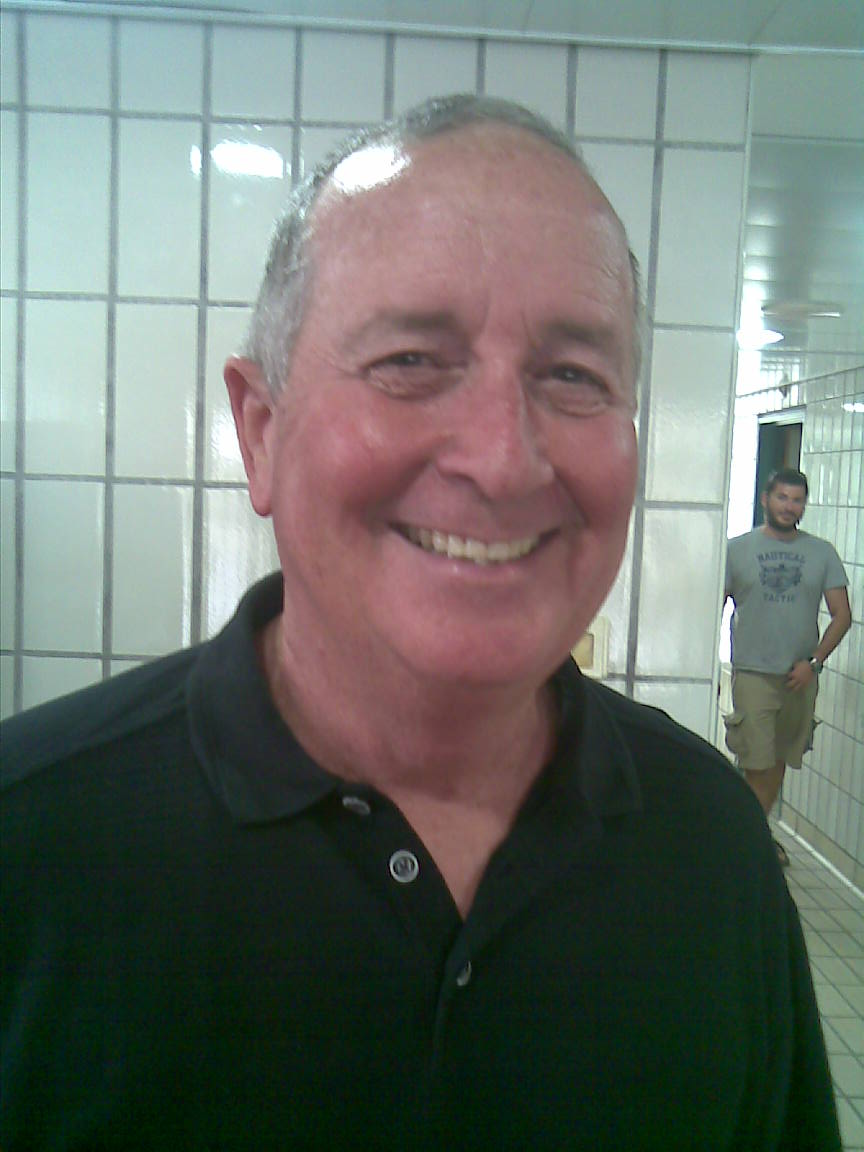
- Reese in 2010

Current position
- Title: Head coach
- Team: Texas
- Conference: Big 12

Biographical details
- Born: July 23, 1941 (age 85); Daytona Beach, Florida, U.S.

Playing career
- 1961–1963: Florida

Coaching career (HC unless noted)
- 1967–1972: Florida (Asst.)
- 1973–1978: Auburn
- 1978–2024: Texas

Accomplishments and honors

Championships
- Conference Championships (44); NCAA Championships (1981, 1988, 1989, 1990, 1991, 1996, 2000, 2001, 2002, 2010, 2015, 2016, 2017, 2018, 2021)

Awards
- CSCAA Coach of the Year; University of Florida Athletic Hall of Fame; Longhorn Hall of Honor; International Swimming Hall of Fame

Edwin Charles Reese (born July 23, 1941) is a Hall of Fame American college and Olympic swimming coach, and a former college swimmer for the University of Florida. Reese won 15 NCAA team championships as the head coach of the University of Texas at Austin men's swimming and diving team from 1978 until retiring in 2024, having previously served as the men's head coach at Auburn University from 1973 to 1978.

He served with the United States' Olympic Swimming Team in 2004 and 2008, and was an assistant coach at the 1992, 1996, 2000 and 2012 Summer Olympics. He is the winningest swim coach in history and is the only collegiate swim coach to win NCAA national team titles in five separate decades. He is widely regarded by many swimming historians as the greatest swim coach in history.

== Early years ==
Reese was born in Daytona Beach, Florida in 1941. He attended Mainland High School in Daytona Beach and swam for the Mainland Buccaneers high school swim team, winning two state high school championships in the 200-yard individual medley swimming event.

He then enrolled in the University of Florida in Gainesville, Florida, where he swam for coach Buddy Crone and coach Bill Harlan's Florida Gators swimming and diving teams, leading the Gators to three consecutive Southeastern Conference (SEC) team championships (1961, 1962, 1963). As the team's senior co-captain, Reese became the first Florida swimmer to win five SEC individual titles in a single season — the 200-yard breaststroke, the 200-yard and 400-yard individual medleys, the 400-yard freestyle relay and the 400-yard medley relay.

Reese graduated from the University of Florida with a bachelor's degree in physical education in 1963.

== Coaching career ==
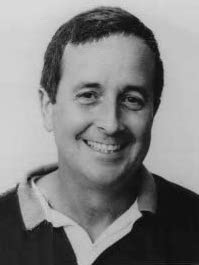
Reese c. 1988

After Reese graduated from Florida, he remained in Gainesville as a graduate assistant coach and earned his master's degree from Florida in 1965. Reese then coached and taught at Roswell High School in Roswell, New Mexico for one year (1965–1966), before returning to the University of Florida as an assistant coach for six seasons (1967–1972).

Reese became the head coach of the Auburn Tigers swim team at Auburn University in Auburn, Alabama in 1972, leading the Tigers for six seasons (1973–1978). The Tigers were a team that had not qualified a single swimmer for the finals or consolation finals of the SEC championship meet during the previous season. After six seasons, Auburn had produced four consecutive top-ten showings at the NCAA championships, and in his final season at Auburn, the Tigers placed second in the SEC and NCAA championships, the highest finish in program history to that time.

In 1978, Reese accepted the head coaching position for the Texas Longhorns men's swimming and diving team of the University of Texas in Austin, Texas. Since that time, his Longhorns team have won 15 National Collegiate Athletic Association (NCAA) team championships (1981, 1988, 1989, 1990, 1991, 1996, 2000, 2001, 2002, 2010, 2015, 2016, 2017, 2018, 2021), and he has been named CSCAA Coach of the Year eight times. Starting with his second year at Texas, his teams have won the conference championship every season (44 in a row as of 2023). Reese has coached numerous current and former world record holders. Some of his notable swimmers include Ian Crocker, Rick Carey, Brendan Hansen, Neil Walker, Ricky Berens, Josh Davis, Dave Walters, Garrett Weber-Gale, Eric Shanteau, Scott Spann, Aaron Peirsol, Jack Conger, Clark Smith, Townley Haas, Will Licon, Joseph Schooling, Drew Kibler, Caspar Corbeau, and Carson Foster. From to 1986 through 2016, Reese coached Texas with Associate Coach Kris Kubik, a former All American swimmer at North Carolina State who excelled in backstroke. Kubik also worked as a student coach with Reese between 1979 and 1981.

== Honors and awards ==
Reese was inducted into the University of Florida Athletic Hall of Fame as a "Gator Great" in 1988, and the International Swimming Hall of Fame (ISHOF) as an "Honor Coach" in 2002. His brother, Randy Reese, who is also a university and Olympic swimming coach, was inducted in 2005. Reese is also a member of the Longhorn Hall of Honor.

== See also ==
- Auburn Tigers
- Florida Gators
- List of University of Florida alumni
- List of University of Florida Athletic Hall of Fame members
- List of University of Florida Olympians
- Texas Longhorns
