= Swimming at the 2019 Pan American Games – Men's 200 metre individual medley =

Men's 200 metre individual medley at the 2019 Pan American Games
- Venue: Villa Deportiva Nacional, VIDENA
- Dates: August 10 (preliminaries and finals)
- Competitors: 24 from 20 nations
- Winning time: 1:59.13

Medalists
Gold medal	Will Licon; United States
Silver medal	Caio Pumputis; Brazil
Bronze medal	Leonardo Coelho Santos; Brazil

The men's 200 metre individual medley competition of the swimming events at the 2019 Pan American Games was held on August 10, 2019, at the Villa Deportiva Nacional Videna cluster.

== Records ==
Prior to this competition, the existing world and Pan American Games records were as follows:

World record	Ryan Lochte (USA)	1:54.00	Shanghai, China	July 28, 2011
Pan American Games record	Henrique Rodrigues (BRA)	1:57.06	Toronto, Canada	July 18, 2015

== Results ==
KEY:	q	Fastest non-qualifiers	Q	Qualified	GR	Games record	NR	National record	PB	Personal best	SB	Seasonal best

=== Heats ===
The first round will be held on August 10.

Rank	Heat	Lane	Name	Nationality	Time	Notes
1	3	4	Will Licon	United States	2:00.97	QA
2	4	5	Caio Pumputis	Brazil	2:02.48	QA
3	2	6	José Martínez Gómez	Mexico	2:02.54	QA
4	2	5	Tomas Peribonio	Ecuador	2:02.67	QA
5	2	4	Leonardo Coelho Santos	Brazil	2:02.74	QA
6	3	5	Javier Acevedo	Canada	2:03.33	QA
6	4	2	Patrick Groters	Aruba	2:03.33	QA, NR
8	3	7	Bernhard Christianson	Panama	2:04.00	QA
9	2	3	Héctor Ruvalcaba	Mexico	2:04.06	QB
10	4	3	Jarod Arroyo	Puerto Rico	2:04.30	WD
11	4	1	Erick Gordillo Guzman	Guatemala	2:06.06	QB, NR
12	3	6	James Dergousoff	Canada	2:06.17	QB
13	3	3	Carlos Claverie	Venezuela	2:06.43	WD
14	4	6	Miguel Ángel Cancel	Puerto Rico	2:06.52	QB
15	3	2	Luis Vega Torres	Cuba	2:07.11	QB
16	4	8	Adriel Sanes	Virgin Islands	2:07.15	QB
17	1	4	Manuel Osorio Moran	Chile	2:07.38	QB, NR
18	4	7	Julio Horrego	Honduras	2:07.78	
19	3	8	Jose Neumann Doig	Peru	2:08.22	
20	2	1	Michael Gunning	Jamaica	2:08.52	
21	2	2	Santiago Corredor	Colombia	2:09.48	
22	2	7	Matías López	Paraguay	2:09.64	
23	1	5	Christian Martinelli	Peru	2:10.38	QB
24	3	1	Luis Weekes	Barbados	2:17.60	

=== Final B ===
The B final was also held on August 10.

Rank	Lane	Name	Nationality	Time	Notes
9	6	Miguel Ángel Cancel	Puerto Rico	2:04.81	
10	5	Erick Gordillo Guzman	Guatemala	2:05.99	NR
11	3	James Dergousoff	Canada	2:06.19	
12	7	Adriel Sanes	Virgin Islands	2:06.90	
13	1	Manuel Osorio Moran	Chile	2:07.44	
14	2	Luis Vega Torres	Cuba	2:07.91	
15	8	Christian Martinelli	Peru	2:11.81	
	4	Héctor Ruvalcaba	Mexico	DSQ	

=== Final A ===
The A final was also held on August 10.

Rank	Lane	Name	Nationality	Time	Notes
1st place, gold medalist(s)	4	Will Licon	United States	1:59.13	
2nd place, silver medalist(s)	5	Caio Pumputis	Brazil	2:00.12	
3rd place, bronze medalist(s)	2	Leonardo Coelho Santos	Brazil	2:00.29	
4	6	Tomas Peribonio	Ecuador	2:01.25	
5	3	José Martínez Gómez	Mexico	2:02.09	
6	8	Bernhard Christianson	Panama	2:03.28	
7	7	Javier Acevedo	Canada	2:04.23	
8	1	Patrick Groters	Aruba	2:06.21	
