= Alexi Spann =

American swimmer (born 1986)

Personal information
- Full name: Alexandra Spann
- Nickname: Alexi
- Nationality: United States
- Born: October 21, 1986 (age 40) Austin, Texas, U.S.
- Height: 5 ft 9 in (1.75 m)
- Relatives: Scott Span Sr. ('79 PanAm bronze); Scott Spann Jr. (2008 Olympian)

Sport
- Sport: Swimming
- Events: 200 breaststroke Individual Medley (UT)
- Strokes: Breaststroke
- Club: Circle C Swim Club; Longhorn Aquatics
- College team: University of Texas
- Coach: Maurice Culley (Bowie High School); Jill Sterkel, Kim Brackin (U. Texas)
Medal record
Women's swimming
Representing the United States
Pan American Games
Gold medal – first place	2003 Santo Domingo	200m Breaststroke

Alexandra ("Alexi") Spann (born October 21, 1986) is a female breaststroke swimmer from the United States, who competed for the University of Texas, and won the gold medal in the women's 200m breaststroke event at the 2003 Pan American Games. Competing in the 200 medley and 100 breaststroke, she was part of a UIL 2003 Texas State team championship while representing Bowie High School in Austin.

== Early life ==
Alexandra was born October 21, 1986 to Beth and Scott Spann in Austin, Texas. From a family of swimmers, her father, Scott Spann Sr., was a six-time US swimming champion and won the bronze medal in the 200 meter individual medley race at the 1979 Pan American Games in San Juan, Puerto Rico. Her brother, Scott Spann Jr., was a member of the 2008 U.S. Olympic Team in the 200 m breaststroke. By 2003, Alexi swam and trained with the strong program at the Circle C Select Swim Club team in Southwest Austin. She attended Austin's Bowie High School where she competed for their strong team under Bowie swim coach Maurice Culley. During her High School career, she helped lead her team to the February, 2003 Texas UIL State Championship. She placed second at the State meet in the 100 breaststroke with a time of 1:03.02 only around a second off the state record. She was later part of a 200 medley relay team for Bowie High at the State Meet that placed first, setting a new state record with a time of 1:44.51. Her High School's team victory in the 2003 state tournament was the first by an Austin based school since 2000. During her High School years, she was an All American four-times as part of USA Swimming, and was the recipient of All state honors. As an Austin resident, she swam for Longhorn Aquatics, loosely associated with the University of Texas, under Texas Coach Randy Reese.

== Competition highlights ==
Spann earned second place honors at the 2002 U.S. Spring Nationals in the 200-yard breaststroke. She was part of a U.S. team silver medal at Brisbane, Australia's Goodwill Games in 2001. On February 20, 2003, she placed first in the 100-yard breaststroke with a time of 1:02.51.

At the 2003 Pan American Games in Santo Domingo, Spann won the gold medal in the women's 200m breaststroke event with a time of 2:29.76.

She placed 10th in the 200-meter breaststroke at the July, 2004 Olympic trials in Long Beach, California. On August 3, 2007, she won a third-place finish in the 200 long course breaststroke at the Conoco Philips National Championships with a time of 2:31.69. On July 28, 2007, she placed second in the 50 Long Course breaststroke with a time of 33.60 at the Speedo Champions series competition in Austin.

At the 2008 Olympic trials, she competed in the July, 2008 Olympic trials in Omaha, but failed to perform to her full capacity due to a shoulder surgery and subsequent surgery in January.

== University of Texas ==
UT Coach J. Sterkel, '84

Spann attended and swam for the University of Texas from around 2005-2010, where she competed in 2005-07 for women's coach Jill Sterkel, a four-time swimming Olympian, and from 2008-2010 for Kim Brackin. Spann majored in Education at Texas.

As a Texas swimmer, she served as a team captain, and was an All American and recipient of honorable mention All American honors three times. Due to an injury, Lexi was unable to compete the first semester of her Junior year, which affected her attempts to qualify for the 2008 Olympics. An able student, in Spring 2006, Spring 2007, Fall 2007, and Spring 2008, she received honors as a member of the Big 12 Honor Roll as recognized by the Conference's Commissioner. At the March, 2010 NCAA championships, she placed thirteenth in the 100-yard breaststroke with a time of 1:01.06, a personal best, though she had placed higher in the preliminaries with a time of 1:00.59, another personal best.
