= Scott Spann (swimmer) =

American swimmer (born 1988)

Personal information
- Full name: Scott Spann Jr.
- National team: United States
- Born: May 11, 1988 (age 38) New Orleans, Louisiana, U.S.
- Height: 6 ft 1 in (185 cm)
- Weight: 205 lb (93 kg)

Sport
- Sport: Swimming
- Strokes: Breaststroke
- Club: Longhorn Aquatics
- College team: University of Texas
Medal record
Men's swimming
Representing the United States
Pan American Games
Bronze medal – third place	2007 Rio	200 m breaststroke

Scott Spann Jr. (born May 11, 1988) is a former American competition swimmer and Pan American Games medalist.

== Career ==
At the 2008 U.S. Olympic Trials, Spann won the 200m breaststroke in 2:09.97, earning a spot on the U.S. Olympic Team roster. Spann also placed third in the 100m breaststroke at trials in 1:00.59.

At the 2008 Summer Olympics in Beijing, China, Spann placed sixth overall in the 200m breaststroke in 2:09.76.

In September 2008, following the Olympics, Spann had surgery to remove a piece of bone that had broken off of his patella and embedded in his tendon. Previously diagnosed as tendonitis, Spann believes he sustained the injury in late 2007 or early 2008 during dryland weight training. Spann swam in a tri-meet for Texas against Michigan and Indiana only a few weeks after surgery. A second surgery followed in November to remove the bursa sac, which had swelled because he began swimming too soon after the first surgery, and to reshape the tendon, which had been frayed by the patella. Spann then developed a staph infection from the surgical wounds. He needed three more surgeries to fight the infection. Spann missed the rest of the 2008–09 NCAA season, his first with Texas after transferring from Michigan.

With only 45 days to train, and time for preparation, he competed at the 2009 USA Nationals and World Championships Trials. Spann placed fourth in both the 100m and 200m breaststrokes, narrowly missing the chance to compete at the World Championships in Rome, Italy.

Spann competed for Michigan from 2006 to 2008. While swimming for Michigan, Spann placed second in the 200-yard breaststroke and fourth in the 100-yard breaststroke at the 2008 NCAA Championships. Spann transferred to Texas in 2008, after his sophomore year, where he swam for Hall of Fame Coach Eddie Reese and Associate Coach Kris Kubik.

In his junior year at Texas, Spann placed 2nd in both the 100-yard and 200-yard breaststrokes at the 2010 NCAA Championships. He helped lead the Longhorns to a first-place finish at the NCAA National Championship. Spann was elected to be one of three captains (alongside Jim Robertson and Bryan Collins) for the 2010-11 Texas Longhorns swimming and diving team, finishing as the runner-up at the NCAA National Championships.

Spann broke school records at two of the top swimming schools in the nation. At the University of Michigan, Spann broke the 100-yard breaststroke, 200-yard breaststroke, 200-yard medley relay and the 400-yard medley relay. At the University of Texas, Spann broke the 200-yard breaststroke team record previously held by Olympic gold medalist and world record-holder Brendan Hansen.

== Personal ==
Spann graduated from Suffolk University Law School in 2019. He is a personal injury attorney at the Derrick Law Office in Simpsonville, South Carolina.

Spann's father, Scott Spann Sr., is a six-time U.S. swimming champion and won the bronze medal in the 200-meter individual medley at the 1979 Pan American Games. His sister, Alexi Spann, was the 200-meter breaststroke champion at the 2003 Pan American Games.

== See also ==
- List of University of Texas at Austin alumni
