= Clark Smith (swimmer) =

American swimmer (born 1995)

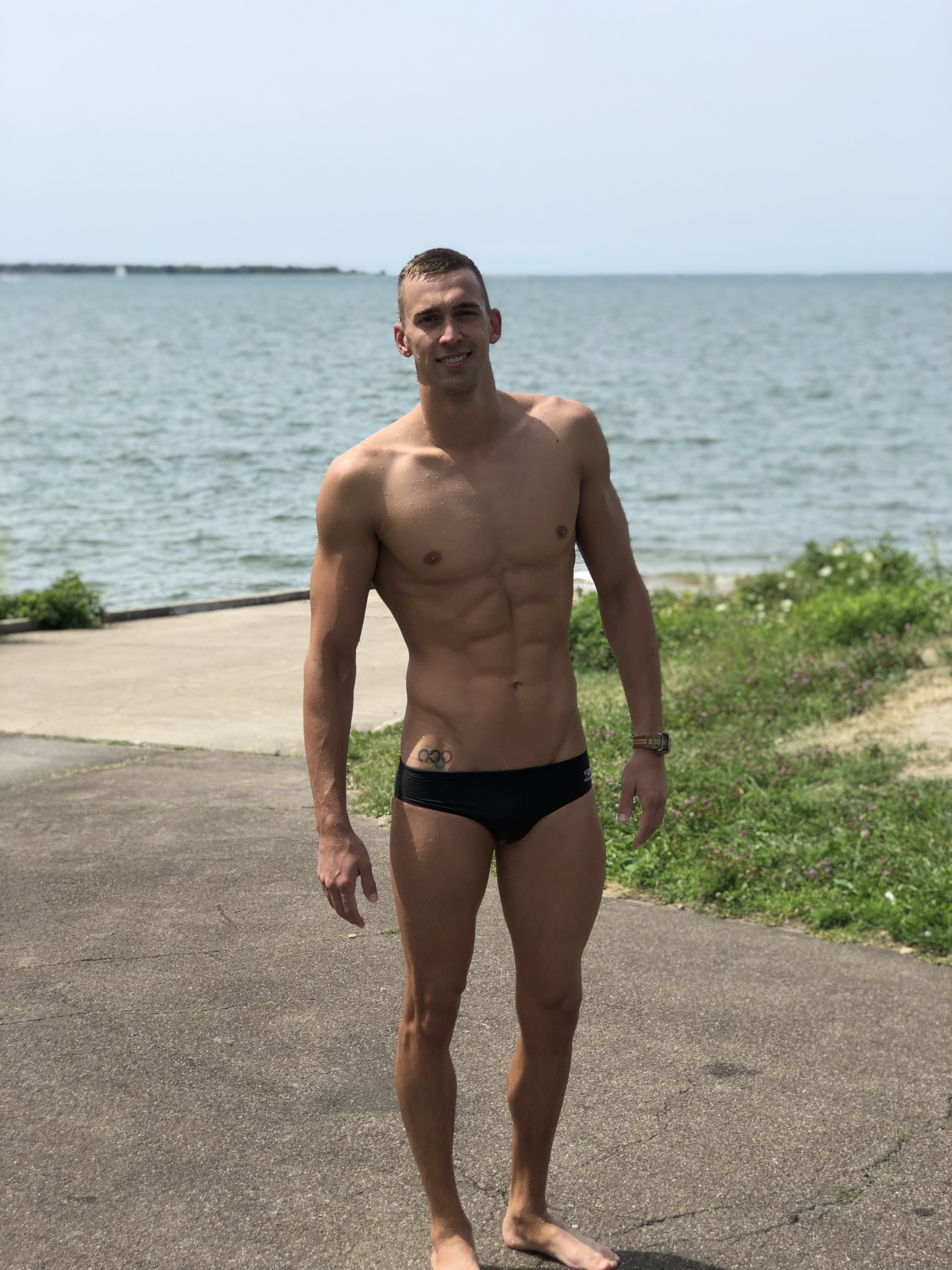

Personal information
- Nationality: United States
- Born: April 17, 1995 (age 31) Atlanta, Georgia, U.S.
- Height: 6 ft 9 in (206 cm)
- Weight: 215 lb (98 kg)

Sport
- Sport: Swimming
- Strokes: Freestyle, Butterfly
- Club: Longhorn Aquatics, Denver Swim Academy
- College team: University of Texas
- Coach: Eddie Reese (U. Texas); Kris Kubik (U. Texas)
Medal record
Men's swimming
Representing the United States
Olympic Games
Gold medal – first place	2016 Rio de Janeiro	4×200 m freestyle
World Championships (LC)
Bronze medal – third place	2017 Budapest	4x200 m freestyle

Clark Smith (born April 17, 1995) is a former American swimmer who specialized in freestyle and butterfly.

Smith was born April 17, 1995 in Atlanta, Georgia to John and Tori Smith, who both swam for the University of Texas. From a swimming family, Smith's father was an NCAA champion for the Texas Longhorns, and his mother represented the US at the 1984 Summer Olympics in Los Angeles. During Clark's teen years, the family made a move to the greater Denver area.

By 15, Clark swam for the Regis Jesuit High School Raiders, a private Catholic pre school in the Denver suburb of Aurora, Colorado, where in May 2010, he won a 5A state title in the 100-yard butterfly with a time of 49.87, and placed second in the 200 freestyle with a time of 1:41.24. In May 2013, improving as a Regis Jesuit senior, Smith broke the high school national record (NISCA) in the 100-yard butterfly in a time of 46.54 seconds.

== University of Texas ==
As a freshman at the University of Texas where he swam under head coach Eddie Reese, and associate coach Kris Kubik, Smith failed to qualify for the 2014 NCAA Championships held in Austin, Texas as the Longhorns finished second place in the team standings.

The next year, Smith not only qualified for the meet but won an individual title in the 500-yard freestyle at the 2015 NCAA Championships, helping the Longhorns win the overall team title.

As noted below, as a Junior at Texas at the 2015 Texas Hall of Fame Invitational in December 2015, Smith broke both the NCAA, and American record in the 1,000 freestyle with an 8:33.93, while swimming the 1,650 freestyle event.

== 2016 Olympic Gold ==
At the 2016 US Olympic Trials, Smith qualified for the 4x200 free relay.

Clark earned an Olympic gold medal at the 2016 Summer Olympics in Rio de Janeiro by swimming a leg of the 4x200 m Freestyle Relay in time of 7:00.66. The British team placed second in the finals with a 7:03.13, and the Japanese team placed a close third with a combined time of 7:03.50.

Smith has simultaneously held the American records in the 500-yard freestyle with a time of 4:08.42, the 1000-yard freestyle with a time of 8:33.93, the 1650-yard freestyle with a time of 14:22.41, and the 800-yard freestyle relay with a time of 6:08.61. Three of the four records were set during the 2017 NCAA Championships his senior year.
